= List of Jeopardy! contestants =

Television game show contestants

Jeopardy! is an American television game show. Its format is a quiz competition in which contestants are presented with general-knowledge clues in the form of answers and must phrase their responses as questions. Many contestants in the show's history have received significant media attention because of their success on Jeopardy!, particularly Brad Rutter, who has won the second highest total prize money on the show (after Ken Jennings) and was undefeated by a human until 2011; James Holzhauer, who holds several of the show's highest overall daily scores; and Ken Jennings, Amy Schneider, and Matt Amodio, who have the top three longest winning streaks. Other contestants have been better known for their accomplishments elsewhere, such as John McCain, a one-day champion in 1965 who later became a U.S. senator and the 2008 Republican presidential nominee.

== 1964–1979 ==
=== Terry Thompson ===
Terry Thompson, a housewife and alumna of Swarthmore College, was the first Tournament of Champions winner. She won $8,590 over the course of her run on Jeopardy!, including $5,080 during her main run and $3,510 (plus a vacation to the Virgin Islands) in the tournament. Thompson noted that her husband was initially wary of her participating in a televised quiz show, as it had been only six years since the quiz show scandals had tarnished the medium's reputation.

=== Burns Cameron ===
Burns Cameron, billed as "a businessman from Larchmont, New York" during his original run and "a realtor from Standish, Maine" on his 1990 appearance, won $11,110 in his appearances on Jeopardy!, including a then-record five-game total of $7,070 in December 1965. Cameron won the third annual Tournament of Champions in 1966, in which he won $4,040. Cameron also appeared on the 2,000th episode in 1972, an all-time-best game in which he faced Elliot Shteir and Jane Gschwend, two 1969 contestants who had surpassed his total in their five-day runs. He finished second and won $700 for charity. Cameron is cited as one of the best players of the Art Fleming era of the show. In 1990, when Jeopardy! creator Merv Griffin produced Super Jeopardy!, a separate weekly prime time network version based on the Trebek version of Jeopardy! to air Saturday nights in the summer on ABC, he invited Cameron to compete as the only player from the Fleming era. Cameron competed in the fifth quarterfinal game, where he finished second (by one point) and won $5,000.

=== John McCain ===
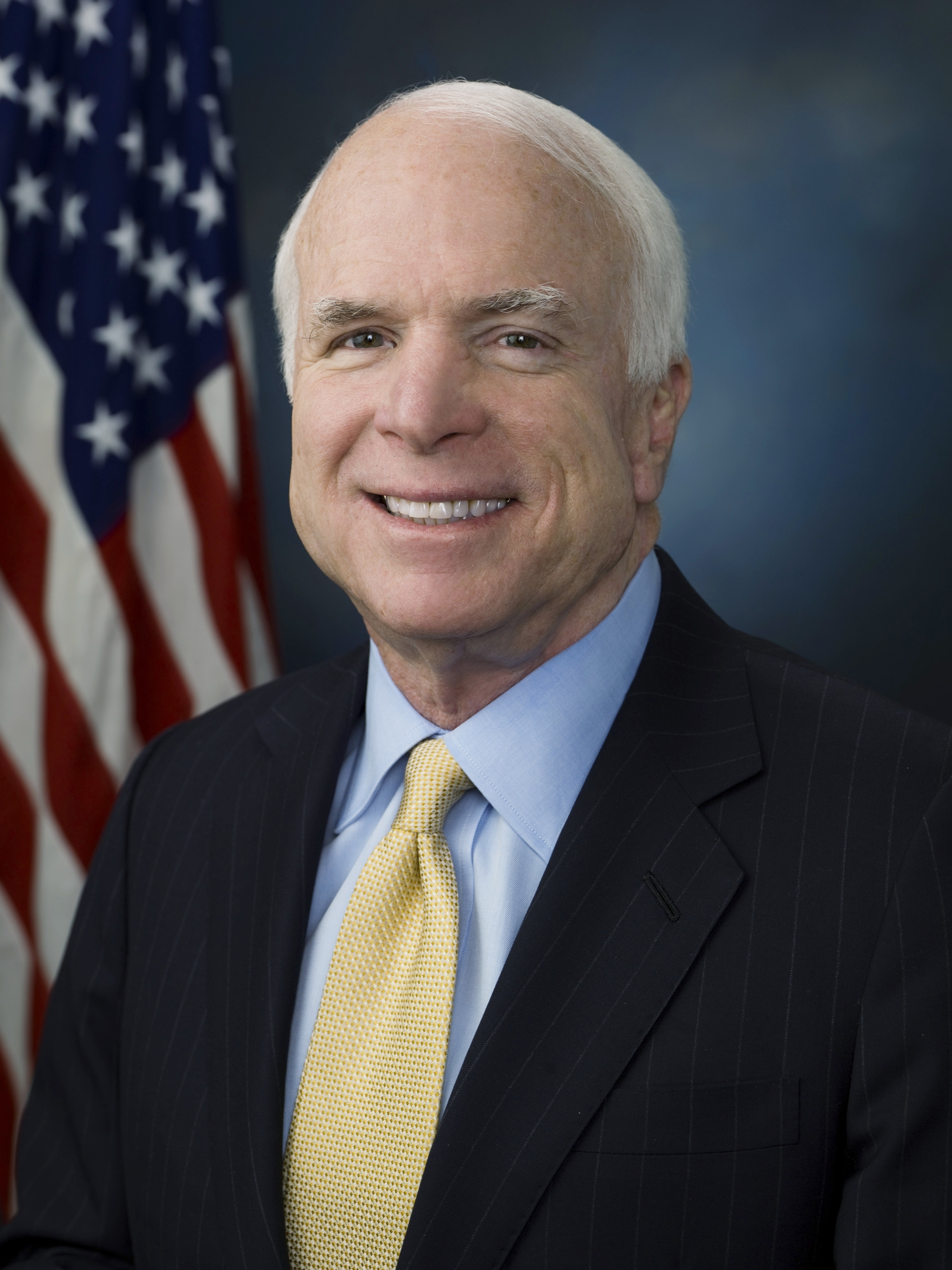
John McCain

U.S. senator and 2008 presidential candidate John McCain was a one-day champion in 1965 before serving in the Vietnam War, spending five and a half years as a POW, and later becoming a senator from Arizona.

=== Red Gibson ===
Hutton "Red" Gibson won the 1968 Tournament of Champions. Gibson later became a prominent sedevacantist and conspiracy theorist. One of his sons is actor, director and producer Mel Gibson.

=== Jane Gschwend ===
Jane Gschwend a high school dropout and homemaker from Lancaster, Pennsylvania, held the record for the most money won in regular Jeopardy! play for the original series with her $8,250 total over five days. She was upset in the semifinal round of the 1969 Tournament of Champions but returned as part of the all-time best charity game on the 2000th episode in 1972, winning that game. Host Art Fleming cited Gschwend as an example of how a common person without traditional credentials could succeed at the game.

=== Jay Wolpert ===
Jay Wolpert won the 1969 Tournament of Champions. He later became known as a game show producer, screenwriter, and occasional actor.

== 1984–2002 ==
=== Greg Proops ===
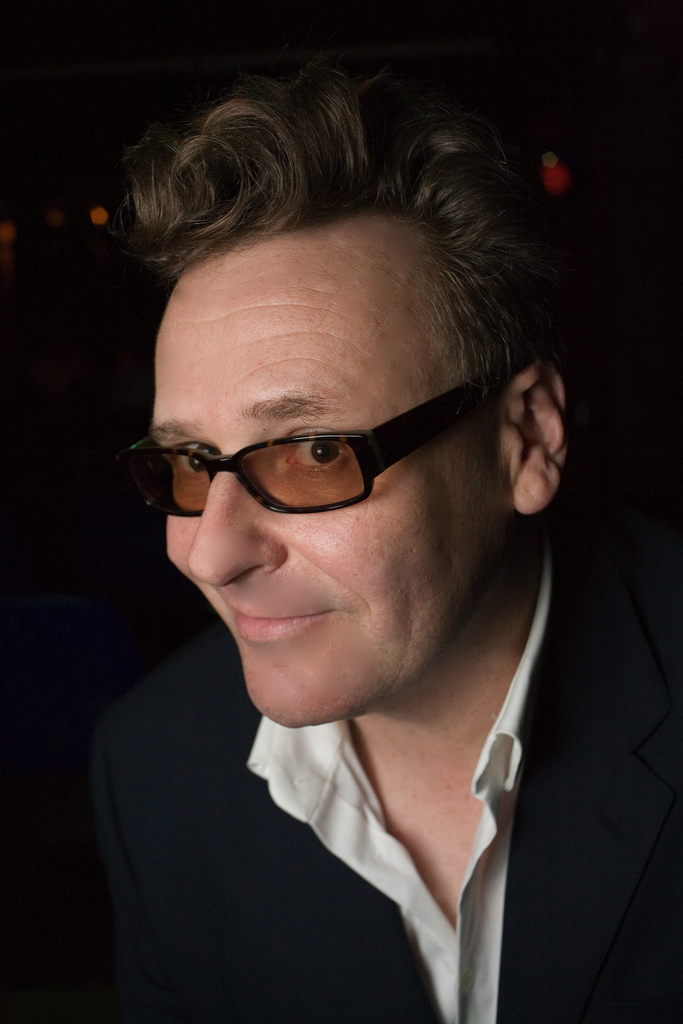
Greg Proops

Gregory Everett Proops, later known for his work on the British and American versions of Whose Line Is It Anyway?, appeared as a regular contestant in November 1984, losing to eventual five day champion John Genova as he place second winning $2,500. He would later record video clues for two episodes of the show in 2000 and 2001.

=== Jerry Frankel ===
Jerry Frankel, a musician and composer from Buffalo, New York, was a five-time undefeated champion during Trebek's first season, winning $32,650. He became that version's first Tournament of Champions winner, earning the $100,000 grand prize by defeating Bruce Fauman and Steve Rogitz in the two-game final.

=== Chuck Forrest ===
Chuck Forrest held the record for the largest non-tournament cash winnings total from 1985 to 1989, and the largest all-time winnings from 1986 to 1990. The show's producers regarded him as one of the best and most memorable contestants of the 1980s. Forrest is widely regarded by other elite Jeopardy! players as one of the most formidable contestants ever. He won five consecutive games from September 30 to October 4, 1985, winning a then-record $72,800 and qualifying for the 1986 Tournament of Champions, which he won, earning another $100,000. Forrest later played in the Super Jeopardy! tournament, the Million Dollar Masters tournament, the Ultimate Tournament of Champions, the Battle of the Decades tournament, and the Jeopardy! Invitational Tournament. He implemented a strategy known as the "Forrest Bounce" to confuse opponents: the strategy involved picking each clue from a different category instead of taking the clues in order. With Mark Lowenthal, Forrest co-wrote the 1992 book Secrets of the Jeopardy! Champions.

=== Michael Moffett ===
Michael Moffett, an American politician from Manchester, New Hampshire, appeared as a contestant in December 1985 where he wore his Marine Corps dress blue uniform, ultimately placing second in his only game.

=== Barbara Lowe ===
Barbara Vollick (née Marquez), a writer and researcher from Anaheim, California, was a five-time undefeated champion during Trebek's second season, winning $35,192 playing under her first and middle name, Barbara Lowe. Host Alex Trebek (then also the show's producer) personally disqualified her from the show's second Tournament of Champions after staff noticed that she had appeared on many different game shows (most notably Wheel of Fortune in 1976, It's Anybody's Guess in 1977, and Bullseye in 1981) under multiple aliases and Social Security numbers without informing the production company, an allegation that Vollick denied; under the show's standards and practices at the time, special permission had to be granted for a contestant to appear on Jeopardy! if they had appeared on more than two other shows in the previous five years.

Vollick attested that only she had only appeared on one such show (Bullseye) in the five-year span, but staff research turned up seven appearances over the previous decade, which Vollick stated she did not recall. Her winnings were withheld, and she sued Merv Griffin Enterprises and King World Productions for it, ultimately receiving her winnings, but was banned from appearing on any future tournaments on the show. The 1993 exposé book Inside Jeopardy! by Harry Eisenberg alleged that during her games, Lowe argued with Trebek over incorrect answers; much of Eisenberg's book was littered with factual errors, misstating her winnings and when she appeared on the program, among other inaccuracies unrelated to her, and the surviving tapes of her episodes reveal only a minor argument in the third episode over the pronunciation of Leopold and Loeb that Trebek had initially erroneously declared incorrect because she had used the German pronunciation of Loeb instead of the English.

Vollick came forward for an interview in May 2023 to discuss her time on the show, stating that shortly before taping her third episode, she developed a case of gastroenteritis which required the show to stop tape until she recovered. She also stated that Trebek told her she was costing the show time and money, and revealed that her stomach ailment had cost the program thousands of dollars that the show was trying to recoup by withholding her winnings. Her episodes were then withdrawn from release and were never re-run following their original airings. On December 15, 2022, the Barbara Lowe episodes were found by the National Archives of Game Show History from a longtime Jeopardy! fan's collection of 108 VHS cassettes of 896 episodes from the show's first seven seasons, and her games were subsequently added to the J! Archive. Vollick expressed surprise that she had attained such infamy in game show fan circles. She would later win $32,000 on Who Wants to Be a Millionaire, again appearing as Barbara Lowe, during which she again experienced a case of gastroenteritis.

=== Richard Cordray ===
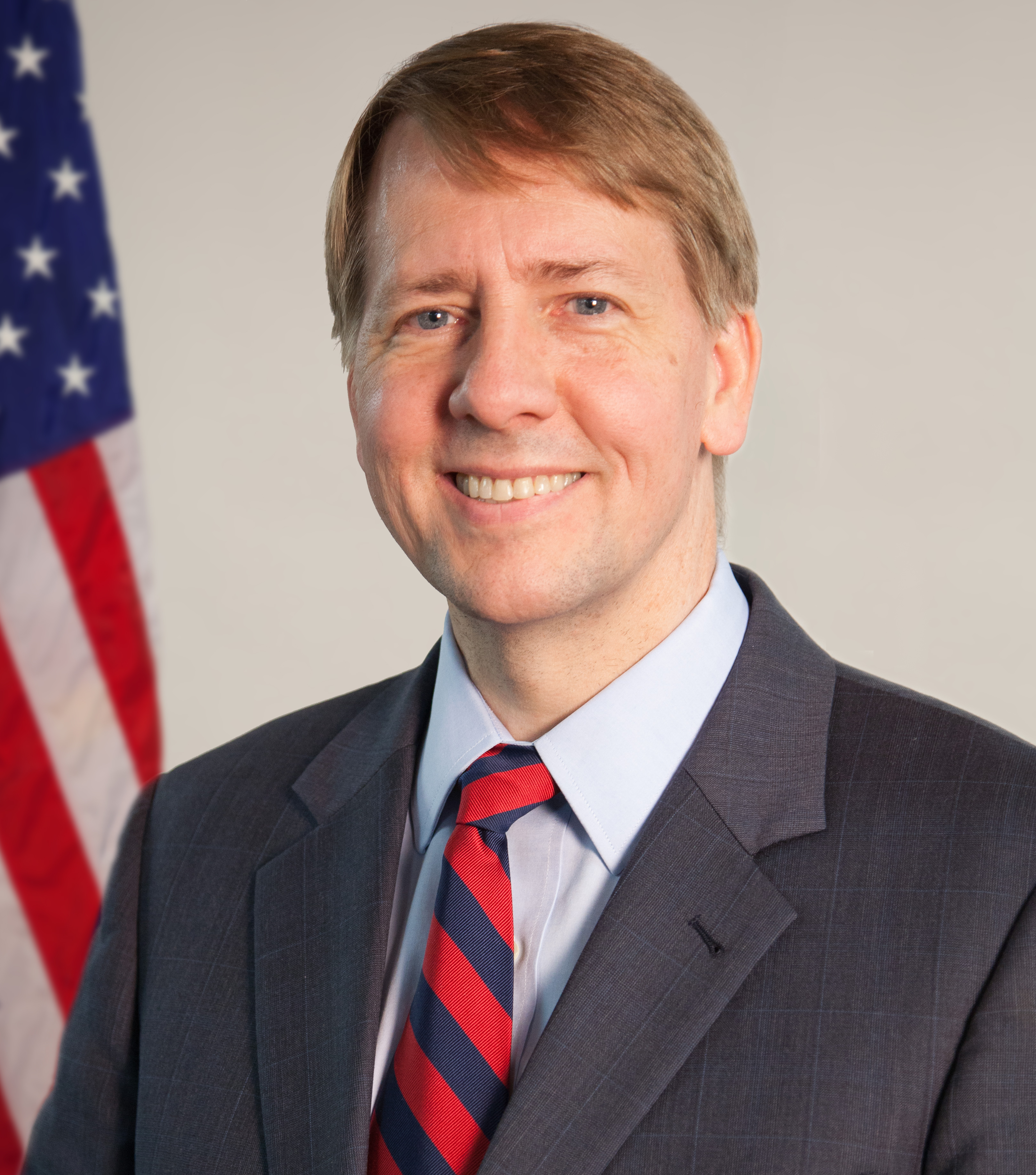
Richard Cordray

Richard Cordray was a five-time Jeopardy! champion in 1987, who appeared in the 1987 Tournament of Champions while still serving as a law clerk. Cordray parlayed his success on Jeopardy! into political office, serving as an Ohio state legislator, the Attorney General of Ohio, and later the first director of the Consumer Financial Protection Bureau. He was a participant in the Battle of the Decades Tournament, but lost in his first match and declined the prize money due to his office.

=== Michael T. Shutterly ===
Michael Tom Shutterly, an American attorney and numismatist from Elkridge, Maryland, appeared as a four-time champion on in February 1988 and won $49,200. In 1990, Shutterly appeared on the short-lived game show Trump Card, winning $14,500 in a single day. In 1999, he became the first contestant to win $500,000 on the U.S. version of Who Wants to Be a Millionaire?.

=== Peter Sagal ===
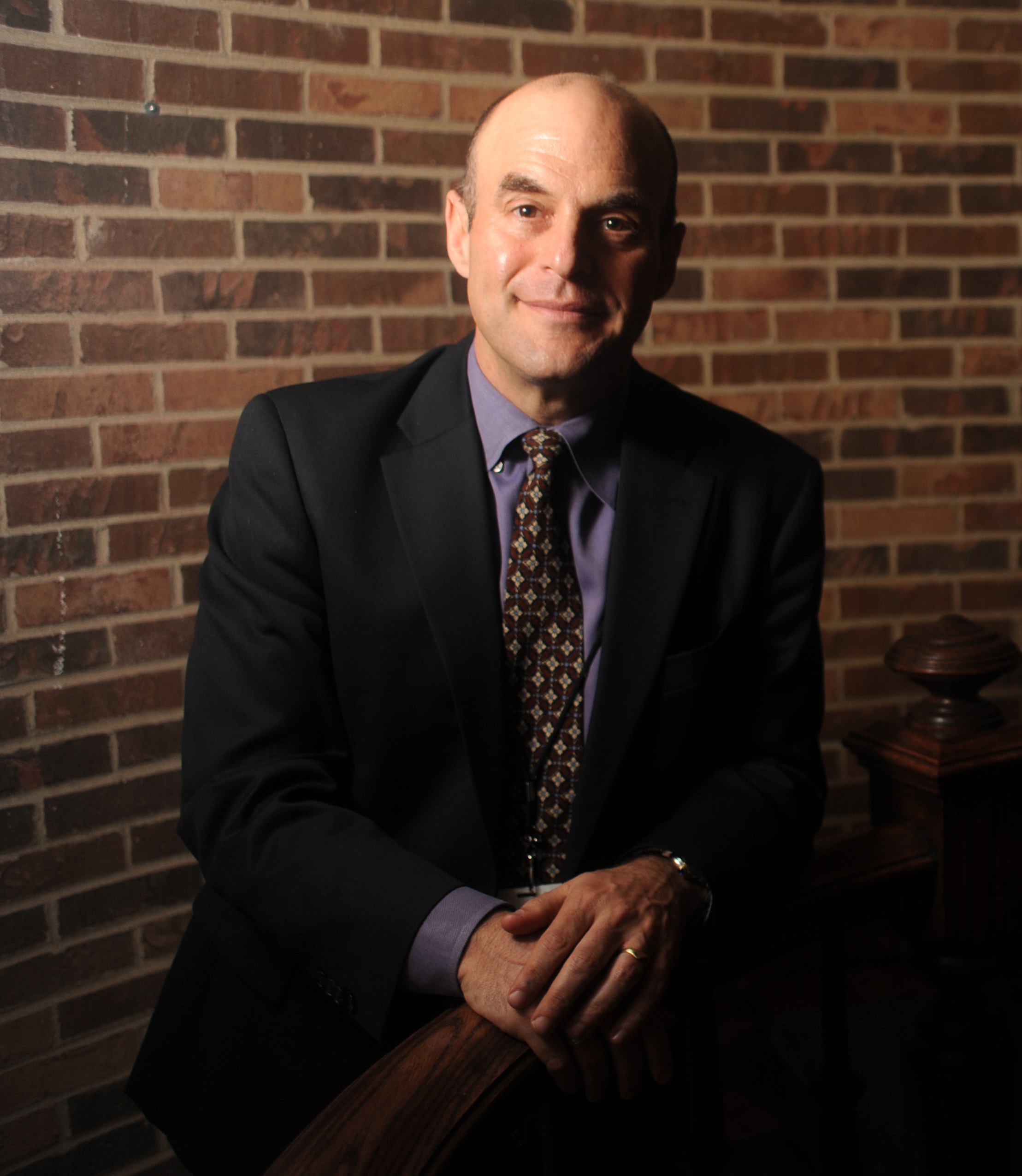
Peter Sagal

Peter Daniel Sagal, who would later be known as the host of the NPR game show Wait Wait... Don't Tell Me!, appeared as a regular contestant in April 1988, in which he placed second winning $6,300.

=== Mark Lowenthal ===
Mark M. Lowenthal was an undefeated five-time champion in 1988 and won the 1988 Tournament of Champions. He also appeared on Super Jeopardy!, the Ultimate Tournament of Champions, winning $5,000 after losing his first game, and the Jeopardy! Battle of the Decades, beating Frank Spangenberg in his initial game. Lowenthal is the co-author (with Season 2 record-setting five-time champion and Tournament of Champions winner Chuck Forrest) of the 1992 book Secrets of the Jeopardy! Champions, and has also written a college textbook on intelligence and national security.

=== Eric Newhouse ===
Eric Newhouse first appeared on Jeopardy! when he won the 1989 Teen Tournament. He was both a semifinalist in the 1989 Tournament of Champions and Super Jeopardy! After winning the 1998 Teen Reunion Tournament, Newhouse was invited to the Million Dollar Masters, where he placed second overall to Brad Rutter. Newhouse was one of nine players to advance directly to the second round of the Ultimate Tournament of Champions but lost his initial game.

=== Tom Cubbage ===
An attorney from Dallas, Texas by way of Bartlesville, Oklahoma, Tom Cubbage is the only contestant in Jeopardy! history to win both the show's College Championship and the Tournament of Champions. Cubbage became the first ever winner of the College Championship in May 1989, winning $26,600 representing Southern Methodist University. In November of that year, he was the $100,000 grand prize winner of the 1989 Tournament of Champions. He also appeared on Super Jeopardy! in 1990 and earned $5,000 for appearing as a quarterfinalist. Fifteen years later in 2005, Cubbage competed in the Ultimate Tournament of Champions. In the first round, he lost his game, finishing second to Bob Harris. In 2014, Cubbage returned to Jeopardy! to compete in the show's Battle of the Decades. In his first game of the tournament, he defeated fellow Jeopardy! alumni Bob Verini and Jerome Vered. Cubbage lost his second game to Ken Jennings, but he finished the game with $19,500, allowing him to secure a wild-card spot in the next round. In the semifinals, Cubbage lost again, finishing third behind Leszek Pawlowicz and eventual tournament winner Brad Rutter. He would later return (using his professional name, T.L. Cubbage) for the 2026 Jeopardy! Invitational Tournament, where he lost his quarterfinal in a low-scoring game, earning $5,000. Cubbage also appeared on the original network run of Who Wants to Be a Millionaire, taking home $32,000 after missing his $125,000 question. He was the first player to correctly answer at least 10 Final Jeopardy questions in a row, a streak broken when his answer in the 2026 JIT game was incorrect.

=== Bob Blake ===
Bob Blake, an actuary from Vancouver, British Columbia, appeared on Jeopardy! in September 1989, won all five games, and broke Forrest's five-day record with $82,501. Because Blake's winnings exceeded the then-limit of $75,000, $7,501 of his winnings were donated to his selected charity, Oxfam. He also competed in Super Jeopardy!, in which he was a semifinalist. He won the 1990 Tournament of Champions, earning $100,000. He also competed in the Ultimate Tournament of Champions in 2005. He was initially invited to compete in the Battle of the Decades tournament but declined because of conflicts with international travel.

=== Ed Toutant ===
Ed Toutant appeared on Jeopardy! in October 1989, winning one episode and $11,401. He later assisted IBM in programming Watson to prepare for the Jeopardy! IBM Challenge. Toutant was better known for his appearance on another game show, Who Wants to Be a Millionaire, in which he won the show's grand prize, a progressive jackpot of $1,860,000.

=== Frank Spangenberg ===
Lieutenant Frank Spangenberg garnered fame in 1990 when he set the five-day cumulative winnings record, becoming the first person to win more than $100,000 in five days on the show. He has been called one of the "veritable legends" of the show. He was also the first to exceed $30,000 (winning $30,600) in a single day.

At the time a member of the New York City Transit Police Department (now the Transit Bureau of the New York City Police Department), Spangenberg won $102,597 in five days. Until 2003, winners were retired after five consecutive victories and due to a winnings cap in place at the time, Spangenberg kept $75,000 of his winnings and donated the remaining $27,597 to the Gift of Love Hospice, a facility operated by the Missionaries of Charity.

Until 2019, the $102,597 record stood as the all-time net five-day record because of 2001 changes to clue values and the 2003 abolition of the five-day limit. The only contestant to date to beat Spangenberg's record is James Holzhauer, who won $298,687 in his first five games.

Spangenberg also won Jeopardy!'s 10th Anniversary Tournament in 1993, winning $41,800, and previously appeared in the 1990 Tournament of Champions and Super Jeopardy! earlier that year. He later competed in the 2002 Million Dollar Masters tournament, the 2005 Ultimate Tournament of Champions and the 2014 Battle of the Decades tournament.

=== Jerome Vered ===
Jerome Vered appeared on Jeopardy! in 1992 and won $96,801 as a five-day champion, retiring undefeated. His total winnings at the time were second only to Spangenberg's $102,597. During that run, he shattered the one-day record for dollar winnings, earning $34,000 in one episode. After his run, Vered returned for the 1992 Tournament of Champions, finishing third. In the 2005 Jeopardy! Ultimate Tournament of Champions, Vered won five games to advance to a three-game final match against fellow Jeopardy! legends Ken Jennings and Brad Rutter. He finished in third place, earning $250,000. He competed in the 2014 Battle of the Decades, losing to Tom Cubbage.

=== Rachael Schwartz ===
Rachael Schwartz is the first female Jeopardy! contestant in the syndication era to win the show's Tournament of Champions, winning the 1994 edition. Schwartz originally appeared on Jeopardy! in October 1993 and won $37,499 as a 4-day champion. After winning the 1994 Tournament of Champions, Schwartz competed in the following Jeopardy! tournaments: The Million Dollar Masters (2002), the Ultimate Tournament of Champions (2005), the Battle of the Decades (2014), and the Invitational Tournament (2025).

=== Tom Nichols ===
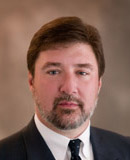
Tom Nichols

Thomas Michael Nichols, who would later become an author, academic, sociopolitical analyst, and columnist for The Atlantic, appeared as a five-time champion in February 1994. He initially lost his fifth game, but was invited back due to "a clue discrepancy". He later participated in the 1994 Tournament of Champions and the 2005 Ultimate Tournament of Champions, losing in the quarterfinals, and the first round, respectively. In a 2022 interview with Newsweek, Nichols advocated for the reinstatement of a five-day limit for winners that had been eliminated in 2003.

=== Ryan Holznagel ===
Ryan "Fritz" Holznagel is another Jeopardy! contestant who has enjoyed notable success on the show. He first appeared on Jeopardy! in November 1994, winning $49,413 as a 4-day champion. Holznagel, who is currently the editor-in-chief of Who2 Biographies, is also the winner of the 1995 Tournament of Champions. He also represented the U.S. at the show's first ever Olympic tournament in 1996. Holznagel later participated in the Ultimate Tournament of Champions in 2005, and in the Battle of the Decades in 2014. While not competing, he realized that Jeopardy! success largely comes down to how well a player is able to use the signaling device to ring in. Using this knowledge, he created a reaction time website and employed various methods, such as coffee and light exercise, to take his reaction time from an average 228 milliseconds to a superhuman 126 milliseconds. He published all his findings in a manifesto named Secrets of the Buzzer in 2015.

=== Jonathan Groff ===
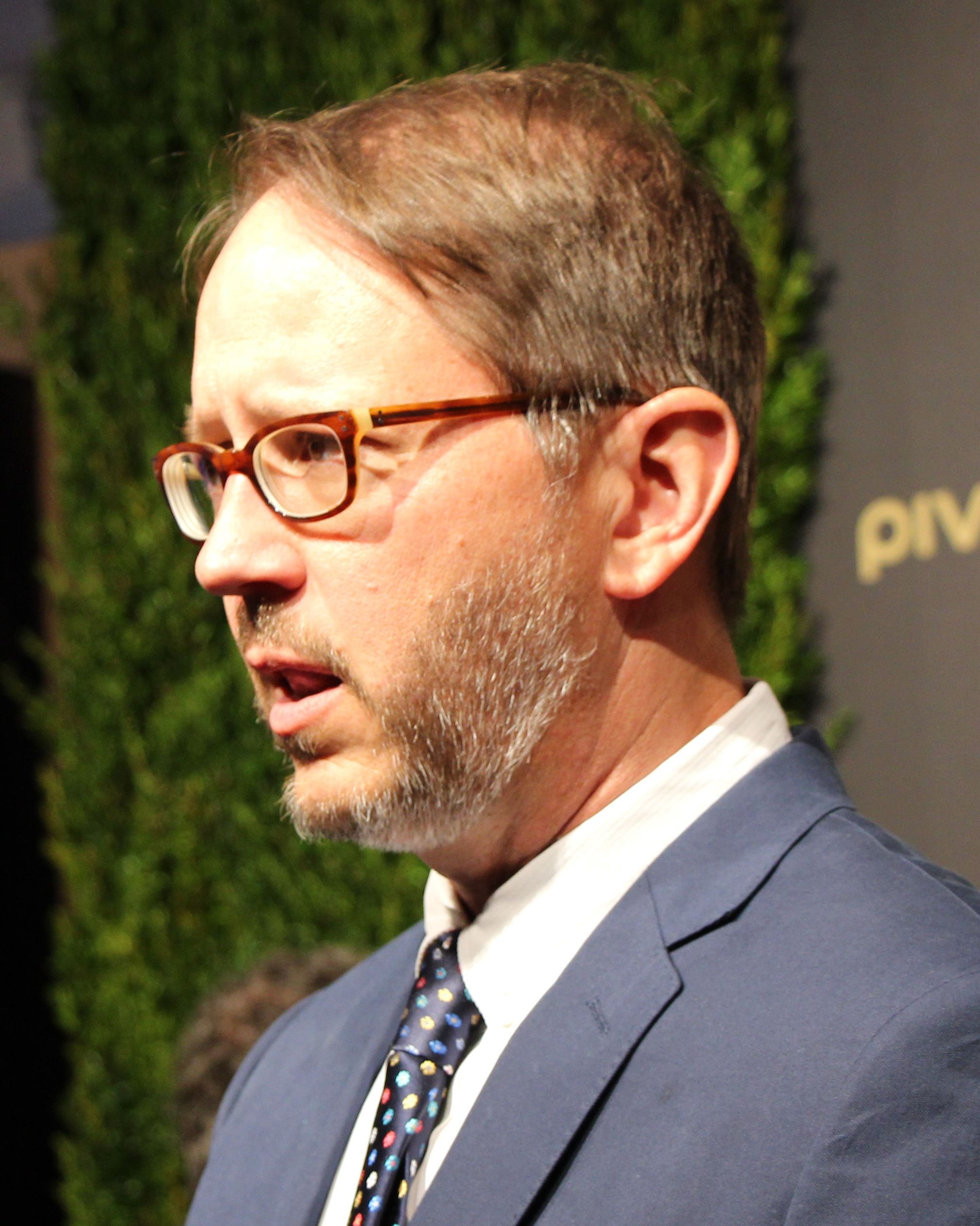
Jonathan Groff

Jonathan Groff, an American actor, director, comedian, director, producer and screenwriter, was a 5-time undefeated champion in March 1995, winning $60,500. He was also a semifinalist in the 1995 Tournament of Champions in November of that year. In 2005, Groff was invited to the Ultimate Tournament of Champions. He won $34,001 in the first 2 rounds of the tournament before being eliminated.

=== Michael Daunt ===
Michael Daunt is another Jeopardy! contestant who has enjoyed prolific success on the show. Daunt first appeared on Jeopardy! from November 30-December 6, 1995, winning $64,198 as an undefeated 5-day champion. Daunt next appeared in the 1996 Tournament of Champions and made it all the way to the final round. He finished in third place behind tournament winner Michael Dupée and second-place contestant Bob Scarpone. In May 1997, Daunt appeared in the Jeopardy! International Tournament. This tournament was filmed in Stockholm on the Swedish version of the show and featured champions who had won on Jeopardy! in foreign markets. Daunt, a native of Canada, won the tournament, winning $35,000 in the process. In 2005, Daunt appeared on the show's Ultimate Tournament of Champions. He won his first 2 rounds, winning $62,202 along the way, before losing his 3rd match. He and Dan Melia tied for second place, finishing behind Jerome Vered.

=== Michael George Dupée ===
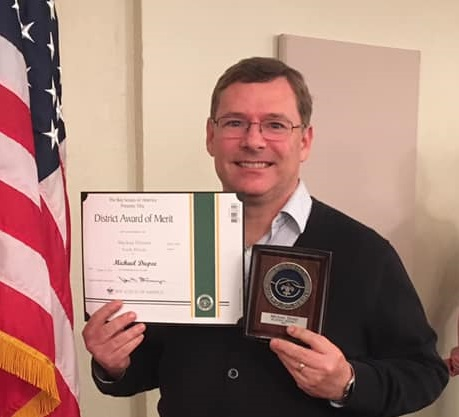
Michael George Dupée

Michael George Dupée originally appeared on Jeopardy! in 1996, and won the Tournament of Champions that year. In 2005, Dupée participated in the Ultimate Tournament of Champions. He won his first match, but lost to Robert Slaven in the second. Nine years later, in 2014, Dupée competed in the Jeopardy! Battle of the Decades tournament, where he was defeated by Brad Rutter.

Dupée's total winnings on Jeopardy! are $203,901, including $66,401 won during his original five-day run; $100,000 for winning the 1996 Tournament of Champions; $32,500 from the Ultimate Tournament of Champions; and $5,000 from the show's Battle of the Decades. Jennings praised Dupée's book, How to Get on Jeopardy! and Win!, claiming it was the best preparation for competing on Jeopardy! In the book, which he wrote after his success on Jeopardy!, Dupée wrote about his experience on the show and provided practice clues for aspiring contestants.

=== Karl Coryat ===
Karl Coryat was a two-day champion on the show in 1996. His name was given to the Coryat score, an analytics measurement of a contestant's ability to answer questions alone, without factoring in wagers on Daily Doubles or Final Jeopardy!.

=== Bernie Cullen ===
Bernie Cullen ia a 5-day Jeopardy! champion and a winner of the $1,000,000 grand prize on Who Wants to Be a Millionaire?. Cullen was an undefeated 5-day Jeopardy! champion in September 1996, first appearing on the Season 13 premiere. He won $63,102, plus another $1,000 as a Tournament of Champions quarterfinalist later that year. On the April 15, 2001 episode of Who Wants to Be a Millionaire?, Cullen won the $1,000,000 grand prize. In 2005, Cullen returned to Jeopardy! to compete in the show's Ultimate Tournament of Champions. He was eliminated in the first round, which earned him $5,000.

=== Arthur Phillips ===
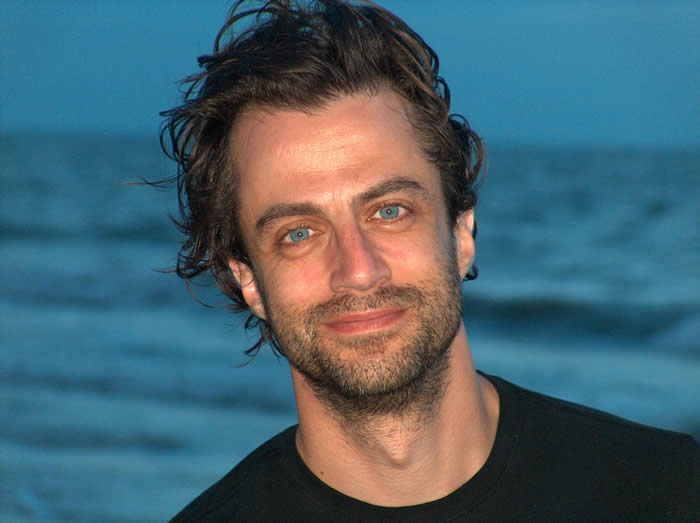
Arthur Phillips

American novelist Arthur Phillips appeared on Jeopardy! in 1997. According to his biography, Phillips was a 5-time undefeated champion, winning $63,003 in the process. He competed in the 1998 Tournament of Champions, but lost his quarterfinal match to Teen Tournament winner Sahir Islam. In 2005, Phillips competed in the Jeopardy! Ultimate Tournament of Champions. He won his first match, winning $8,800 (which was bumped to $15,000), and lost his second, finishing behind Eric Terzuolo and former College Championship winner Pam Mueller.

=== Bob Harris ===
Bob Harris is a multi-time contestant on Jeopardy! Harris first appeared as a contestant in 1997 and won $58,000 as an undefeated five-time champion. The next year, he finished third in the Tournament of Champions, behind Kim Worth and Dan Melia. In the first round of the Jeopardy! Million Dollar Masters tournament in 2002, Harris scored an upset victory over Rachael Schwartz and Frank Spangenberg. He lost in the semifinals to Eric Newhouse. In 2005, Harris competed again on the show, this time in the Jeopardy! Ultimate Tournament of Champions. He won $24,400 and defeated fellow Jeopardy! alumni Frank Epstein and Tom Cubbage in Round 1, but lost in Round 2 to Bruce Borchardt and Michael Daunt. In 2014, Harris competed in the Battle of the Decades. In his match, Harris finished third, behind Shane Whitlock and Robin Carroll.

Harris wrote a book about his experiences on Jeopardy!, Prisoner of Trebekistan. He has competed on other game shows. In 2000, Harris participated in a million-dollar winning team on Greed, winning $200,000 for himself. He was also a successful $250,000 phone-a-friend for a contestant on Who Wants to Be a Millionaire?.

=== Eddie Timanus ===
Eddie Timanus was the first blind contestant to compete on the show, appearing in October 1999. He won five consecutive games—the limit at that time—and earned $69,700 and two cars. Timanus subsequently appeared in the Million Dollar Masters, the Ultimate Tournament of Champions, and the Battle of the Decades.

=== Drew Karpyshyn ===
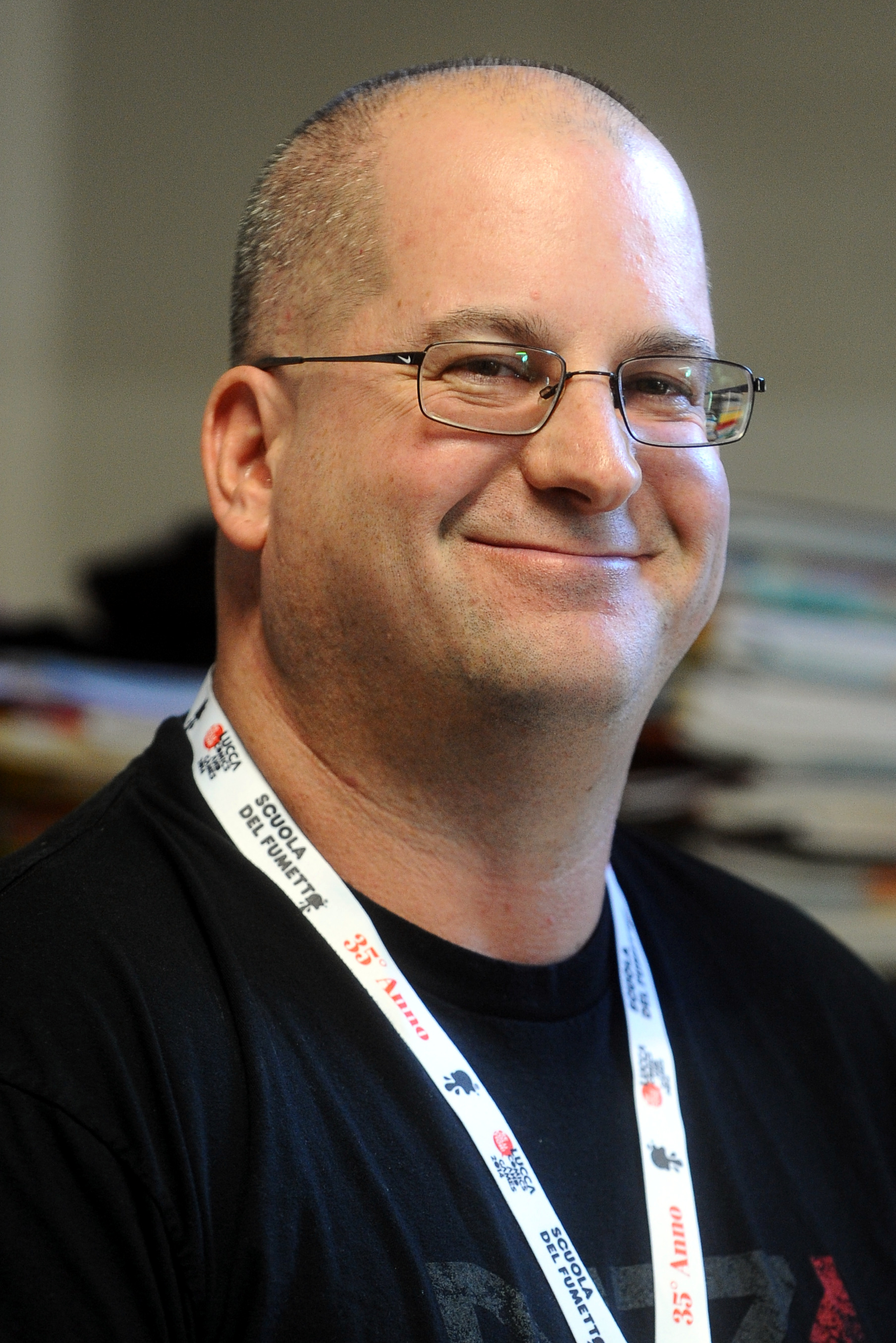
Drew Karpyshyn

Drew Karpyshyn, who would later join the video game comapany BioWare, appeared as a regular contestant in March 2000, finishing in third place.

=== Brad Rutter ===
Brad Rutter is the biggest all-time money winner on Jeopardy! and briefly held the record for biggest cumulative game show winnings for any U.S. game show contestant. Rutter retained the record for Jeopardy! winnings with either $4,255,102 (or $4,270,102, including a pair of Chevrolet Camaros). He became a five-day undefeated champion on Jeopardy! in 2000, with a total of $55,102. Rutter subsequently won five Jeopardy! tournament titles: the 2001 Tournament of Champions, the 2002 Million Dollar Masters Tournament, the 2005 Ultimate Tournament of Champions, the 2014 Battle of the Decades, and the 2019 All-Star Games.

In 2020, Rutter's undefeated streak ended when he finished third in the Jeopardy! The Greatest of All Time tournament, losing to Jennings and Holzhauer by a final score of 3–1–0.

=== Pam Mueller ===
Pam Mueller is a former winner of the College Championship in 2001. She participated in the Ultimate Tournament of Champions, advancing all the way to the Sweet Six round before losing her match, finishing behind Frank Spangenberg and Jerome Vered. In 2014, Mueller competed in the show's Battle of the Decades. The story about her first match in this tournament, which saw her compete against fellow Jeopardy! champions Dan Melia and Ryan (Fritz) Holznagel, was featured on Who2 Biographies.

=== Dileep Rao ===
Dileep A. Rao, who would later be known for his roles in the Avatar franchise (2009-present) and Inception (2010), appeared as a regular contestant on June 7, 2002, winning $34,400.

== 2003–2020 ==
=== Ken Jennings ===
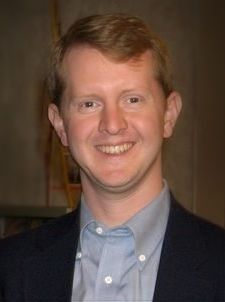
Ken Jennings

Ken Jennings first appeared on Jeopardy! on June 2, 2004, a year after producers of the show lifted the five-show cap for contestants in 2003. Because the five-game limit was removed, Jennings continued his win streak and eventually broke the winnings record set by Tom Walsh, who had won $186,900 in eight games in January 2004.

Jennings set a record of 74 wins before he was defeated by Nancy Zerg in his 75th appearance. His total winnings from the program amount to $3,022,700, which includes $2,522,700 won in his initial appearances and an additional $500,000 for his second-place finish in the Jeopardy! Ultimate Tournament of Champions. In addition, at the end of Season 20, he set a one-day record of $75,000, which was later broken by Roger Craig, and even later by James Holzhauer.

During his first run of Jeopardy! appearances, Jennings earned the record for the highest American game show winnings. His total was later surpassed by Brad Rutter, who defeated Jennings in the finals of the Ultimate Tournament of Champions, adding $2 million to his earlier Jeopardy! winnings. Jennings regained the record after appearing on several other game shows, including appearances on 1 vs. 100 and Grand Slam, culminating in an appearance on Are You Smarter Than a 5th Grader? in which Jennings won $500,000. Rutter retained the Jeopardy! record by defeating Jennings in the finals of the Battle of the Decades tournament in 2014.

After his success on Jeopardy!, Jennings wrote of his experience and explored American trivia history and culture in Brainiac: Adventures in the Curious, Competitive, Compulsive World of Trivia Buffs, published in 2006.

Jennings returned to Jeopardy! finishing runner-up to the Watson Supercomputer (splitting $300,000 with a charity) and again for the Battle of the Decades where he finished runner-up to Rutter again (winning $100,000). Jennings' total winnings amount to $3,422,700.

His team finished runner-up in the 2019 Jeopardy! All-Star Games relay tournament. In 2020, Jennings won the Jeopardy! The Greatest of All Time primetime event, which thus gave him his first Jeopardy! tournament title and an additional $1 million in winnings.

In September 2020, as host Alex Trebek's pancreatic cancer progressed, Jennings became a consulting producer for Jeopardy!, a role that included reading select on-air categories. When Trebek died the following November, Jennings was named the first interim guest host of the program. His episodes began airing in January 2021. In July 2022, Jennings became a permanent host of the show, along with Mayim Bialik. In January 2023, he was announced as the host of Jeopardy! Masters, which premiered on May 8, 2023. In December 2023, Jennings was named as the sole permanent host of Jeopardy! following Bialik's withdrawal.

=== Nancy Zerg ===
Nancy Zerg defeated 74-day champion Ken Jennings on November 30, 2004. She was the first contestant to be called "a giant killer" despite losing the next day.

=== David Madden ===
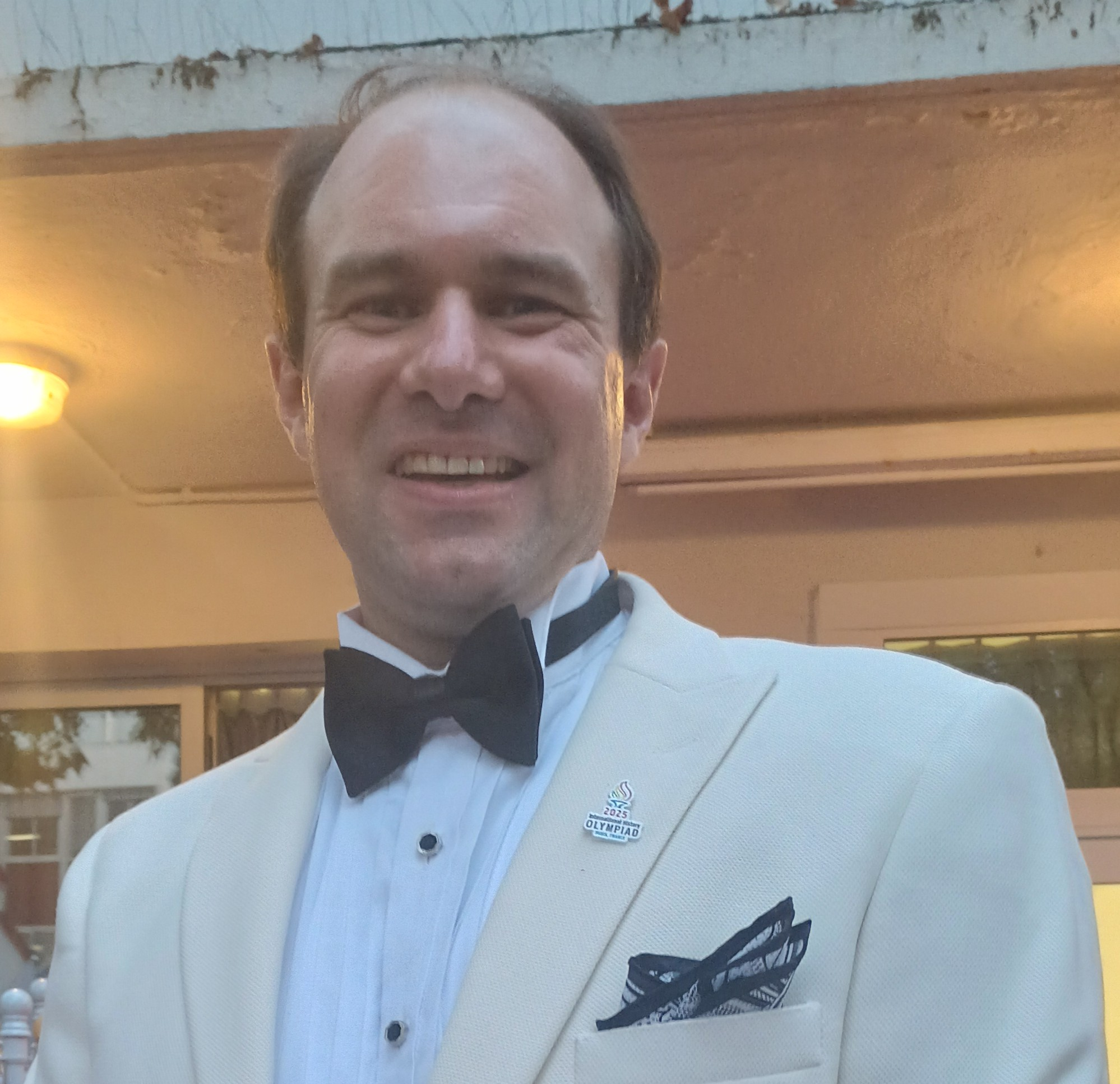
David Madden

David Madden won the fourth-highest number of games on Jeopardy! in non-tournament gameplay, winning 19 games and $432,400 between July 5 and September 19, 2005. As of April 2019, Madden ranked fourth in consecutive game wins (James Holzhauer, Julia Collins, and Ken Jennings) and also fifth in dollar winnings from regular games (Jennings, Holzhauer, Matt Amodio, and Jason Zuffranieri). In the 2006 Tournament of Champions, Madden won his first match (defeating the eventual winner of the Tournament, Michael Falk), but failed to win his second-round match, taking home a consolation prize of $10,000 and bringing his total to $442,400. Madden was invited to take part in 2014's Battle of the Decades Jeopardy! event, but declined to participate due to contractual issues. However, he was invited and able to take part in its 2019 All-Star Games tournament, featuring 18 past champions. Madden was the seventh out of 12 picks in the All-Star Games Draft in September 2018, thus becoming a member of "Team Brad" along with his former Princeton University Quiz Bowl teammate Larissa Kelly, the 6th pick in the draft. Team Brad won its first-round match and in the final episode, airing on March 5, 2019, won the All-Star Games Tournament grand prize of $1,000,000, which was split between the three team members. After Madden's share of the prize was received, his all-time Jeopardy! earnings totaled $775,733.33, which as of March 2019 ranked third all-time behind Rutter and Jennings.

=== Victoria Groce ===
Victoria Groce defeated 19-day winner David Madden in 2005 and returned to Jeopardy! in 2024, winning the Jeopardy! Invitational Tournament and Jeopardy! Masters.

=== Larissa Kelly ===
Larissa Kelly won a total of $222,597 over six games and $1,000 third place consolation prize in her seventh game, with her last appearance airing May 28, 2008. At the time of her run on the program, Kelly was the highest-winning female contestant and ranked fifth in all-time in Jeopardy! earnings (excluding tournament winnings).

In addition to previously being the highest-winning female contestant in regular play, Kelly broke Ken Jennings's record for most money won in five days by winning $179,797. Kelly is also the third-highest-winning female contestant in any single game in Jeopardy!'s history, as her $45,200 performance trails Maria Wenglinsky, who won $46,600 on November 1, 2005, and Emma Boettcher, who won $46,801 on June 3, 2019, after upsetting long-running champion James Holzhauer.

Kelly's husband and sister were also contestants. Her husband fell to Jennings and her sister to Aaron Schroeder, the victors being later finalists in the 2009 Tournament of Champions. She appeared again in the 2019 Jeopardy! All-Star Games team tournament with Madden on Rutter's winning team.

=== Alonso Duralde ===
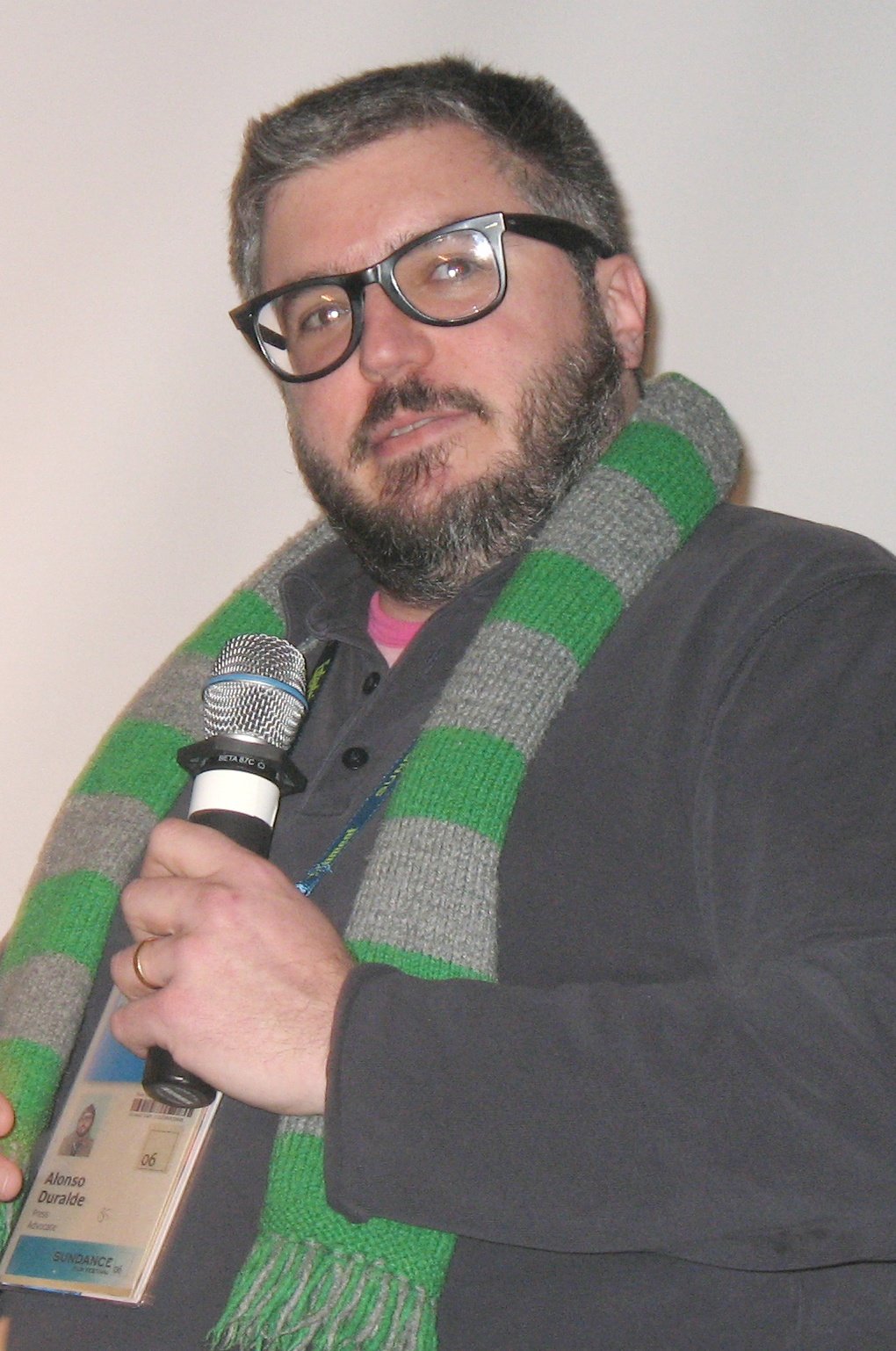
Alonso Duralde

Alonso Ampuero Duralde, an American film critic, author, and podcaster, appeared as a regular contestant in January 2010, placing second winning $13,999.

=== Roger Craig ===
Roger Craig set a then one-day Jeopardy! winnings record of $77,000 during his second appearance on the show in September 2010. Craig won the Tournament of Champions the next year, and in the process set a then record for largest daily double (unadjusted) in Jeopardy! history.

He appeared again in the 2019 Jeopardy! All-Star Games relay tournament with 2013 Teen Tournament champion Leonard Cooper on Roger's team.

=== Watson ===
Watson is a "deep question answering system" built by IBM to play Jeopardy! Watson was in a two-game, three-day exhibition match against Ken Jennings and Brad Rutter that aired February 14–16, 2011. Watson won the match with a total of $77,147.

=== Colby Burnett ===
Colby Burnett was the first Jeopardy! contestant to win both the Teachers Tournament and the Tournament of Champions. A teacher at Fenwick High School in Oak Park, Illinois, Burnett won the Teachers Tournament in November 2012. In February 2013, he won the show's Tournament of Champions, taking home the $250,000 grand prize. He later appeared on season 3 of TBS's reality game show King of the Nerds. Burnett is known for competing wearing oversized suits, sometimes with jackets that stretch all the way down to his knees.

Burnett appeared in the 2019 Jeopardy! All-Star Games tournament, with his team and finished third behind Brad Rutter's and Ken Jennings's teams.

=== Michael Ellis ===
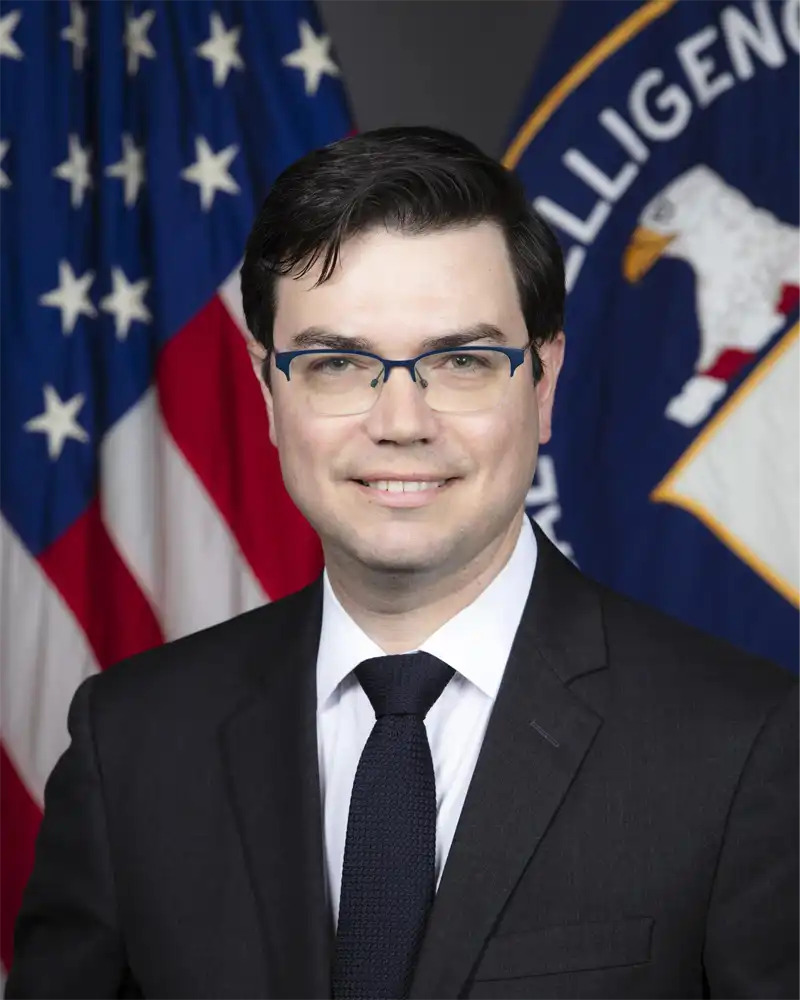
Michael Ellis

Michael Ellis, an American lawyer and political operative from Washington D.C., appeared as a contestant in April 2013, winning $16,400 in his first appearance before being defeated in his second appearance.

=== Arthur Chu ===
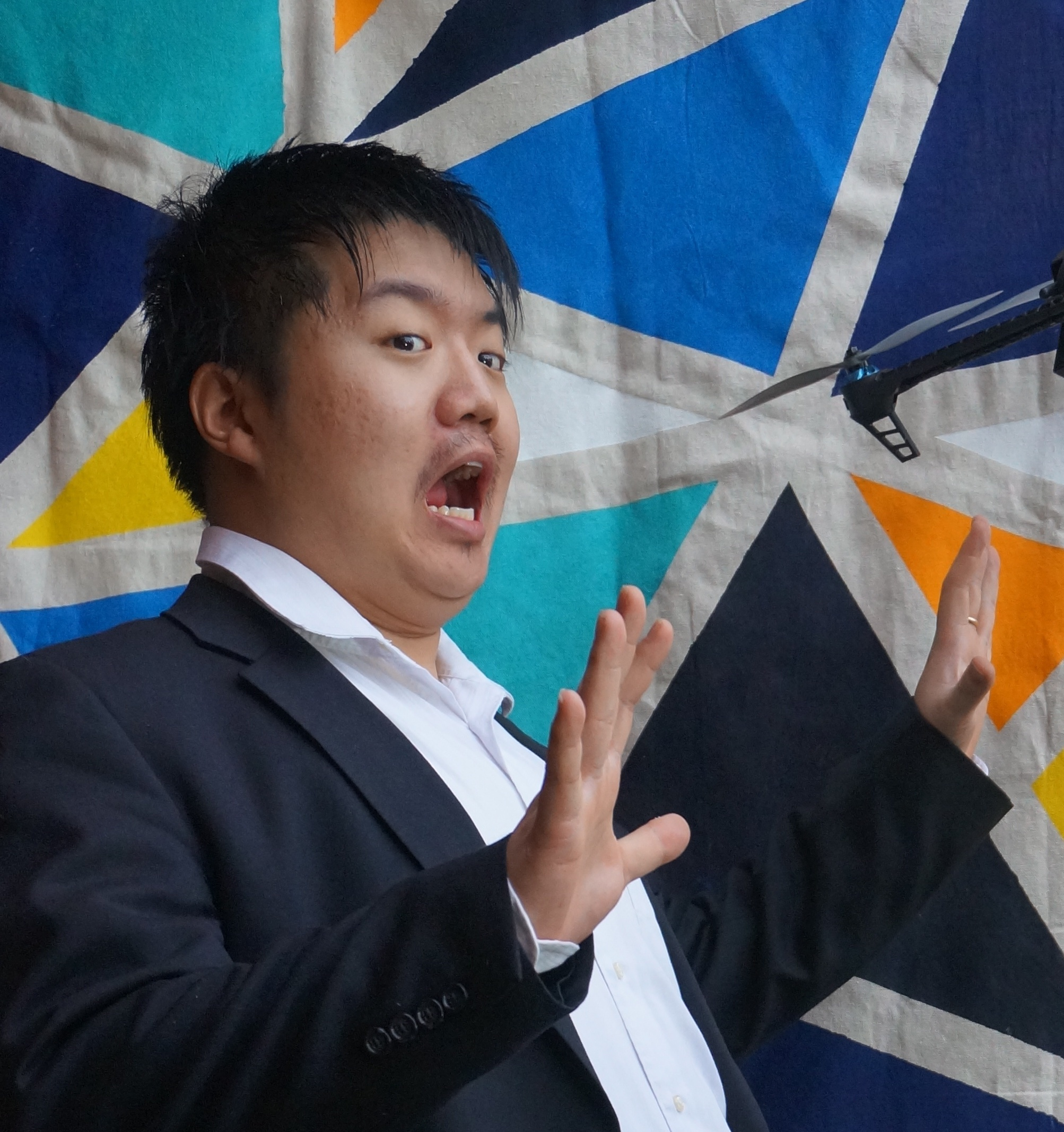
Arthur Chu

Arthur Chu first appeared on Jeopardy! on January 28, 2014, and almost immediately became a lightning rod because of his unusual playing style. His game theory, "Forrest Bounce", and furious pressing of the signaling device made him one of the show's most controversial contestants. As of January 31, 2021, Chu ranks eighth on the list of all-time highest-earning Jeopardy! non-tournament champions, with an 11-day total of $297,200. His winning streak came to a close when he lost his 12th game but won $1,000 for finishing in third place, leaving him with a final total of $298,200. After his initial appearance on the show, Chu competed in the 2014 Jeopardy! Tournament of Champions, finishing second to Ben Ingram, an IT consultant from South Carolina. Chu won $100,000 for his second-place finish, bringing his overall winnings to $398,200.

=== Julia Collins ===
Julia Collins had the fifth-longest streak of consecutive victories, behind Ken Jennings, Amy Schneider, Matt Amodio, and James Holzhauer, with 20 wins and $429,100, until Mattea Roach surpassed her wins total on May 3, 2022. She was the second person to win 20 games in a row. In the 2014 Jeopardy! Tournament of Champions she finished second in her quarterfinal game against Joshua Brakhage and 2013 College Champion Jim Coury, but reached the semifinals as a wild card. She then won her semifinal game, advancing to the finals, where she finished third, behind Ben Ingram and Arthur Chu.

Collins appeared again in the 2019 Jeopardy! All-Star Games relay tournament with Ben Ingram and Seth Wilson.

=== Alex Jacob ===
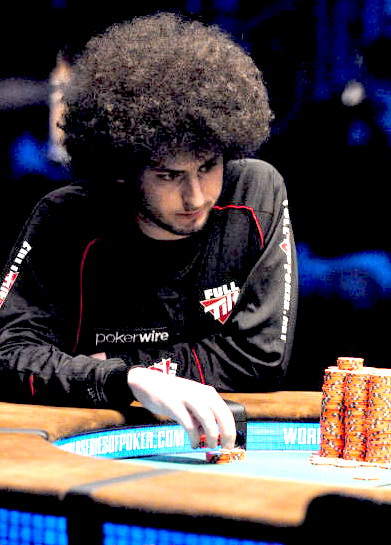
Alex Jacob

Alex Jacob is a former professional poker player who lives in Chicago, Illinois, and worked as a currency trader for the Gelber Group. In 2015, Jacob won six games and the 2015 Tournament of Champions. In a Final Jeopardy round where Jacob did not need any additional money to win the game, he humorously wrote "What is Aleve?", mimicking the slogan of one of the show's regular advertisers.

Jacob appeared again in the 2019 Jeopardy! All-Star Games relay tournament with 2015 Teachers Tournament champion Jennifer Giles on Buzzy Cohen's team.

=== Matt Jackson ===
Matt Jackson, 13-time champion, surpassed Arthur Chu's 11-game winning streak with his 12th win on October 12, 2015. He has also beat Chu in regular season cash earnings with a total of $413,612. He competed in the 2015 Jeopardy! Tournament of Champions, finishing second to Alex Jacob.

Jackson appeared again in the 2019 Jeopardy! All-Star Games relay tournament alongside Ken Jennings and 2012 College Championship winner Monica Thieu.

=== Buzzy Cohen ===
Austin David "Buzzy" Cohen, a recording industry executive from Los Angeles, won $164,603 over nine games in April and May 2016. Many of his victories were guaranteed victories, which allowed Cohen to wager nothing and use his final response to make jokes about Alex Trebek, which earned him both praise and disdain from Jeopardy! fans. He returned for the 2017 Tournament of Champions, which he won, collecting the grand prize of $250,000.

Cohen appeared again in the 2019 Jeopardy! All-Star Games relay tournament.

After Trebek's death, Cohen hosted the May 2021 Jeopardy! Tournament of Champions.

=== Seth Wilson ===
Seth Wilson is a Ph.D. candidate and adjunct professor formerly from Chicago, now from Nacogdoches, Texas, who won $265,002 over 12 games in September and October 2016, making him the contestant with the fifth-highest number of consecutive wins in the show's history, beating Arthur Chu's number of winning games. He later returned for the 2017 Tournament of Champions, but failed to win his first match, taking home a consolation prize of $5,000.

Wilson appeared again in the 2019 Jeopardy! All-Star Games relay tournament on Julia Collins's team with Ben Ingram.

=== Cindy Stowell ===
Cindy Stowell was a science content developer from Austin, Texas, who was diagnosed with untreatable terminal colon cancer between passing the qualifying test and auditioning in person. A lifelong fan of the show, Stowell requested that producers rush her into taping as soon as possible because of her condition, a stipulation the producers honored. She was under pain management and experienced fever and stomachache throughout her run, during which she won $105,803 over six games, which she donated to cancer charities. Her fellow contestants were unaware of her illness. Stowell died eight days before her first episode aired, but did get to watch the first three of her episodes when producers provided her with an advance DVD.

At the end of the Jeopardy! credits on December 21, 2016, Alex Trebek gave a tribute to Stowell and said, "For the past six Jeopardy! programs, you folks have been getting to know the talented champion Cindy Stowell. Appearing on our show was the fulfillment of a lifelong ambition for that lady. What you did not know is that when we taped these programs with her a few weeks ago, she was suffering from Stage IV cancer. And sadly, on December 5th, Cindy Stowell passed away. So from all of us here at Jeopardy!, our sincere condolences to her family and her friends." This was followed by "IN MEMORIAM Cindy Stowell 2016."

=== Austin Rogers ===
Austin Tyler Rogers is a bartender from New York City who earned $445,000 over 13 shows in 2017. Described by one account as "Krameresque" and by Trebek himself as "outside the box, completely different from what many viewers expect a 'Jeopardy!' contestant to be," Rogers is known for his flair and quirky poses, pantomiming humorous actions when being introduced. Although he does not own a television set, he prepared for qualification by watching a lot of Jeopardy! episodes and knowing its tricks. Before James Holzhauer, he was the only contestant with two of the top ten one-day totals: $69,000 on October 3, 2017 (third place) and $65,600 on October 2, 2017 (seventh place). In the 2017 Tournament of Champions, Rogers finished third behind Buzzy Cohen and Alan Lin. All three finalists (including Seth Wilson) appeared at the Jeopardy! All-Star Games in 2019. Rogers was also a contestant on Cash Cab. He won $2,400 with one other rider doubling their winnings on the video bonus at the end of the trip.

=== Paris Themmen ===
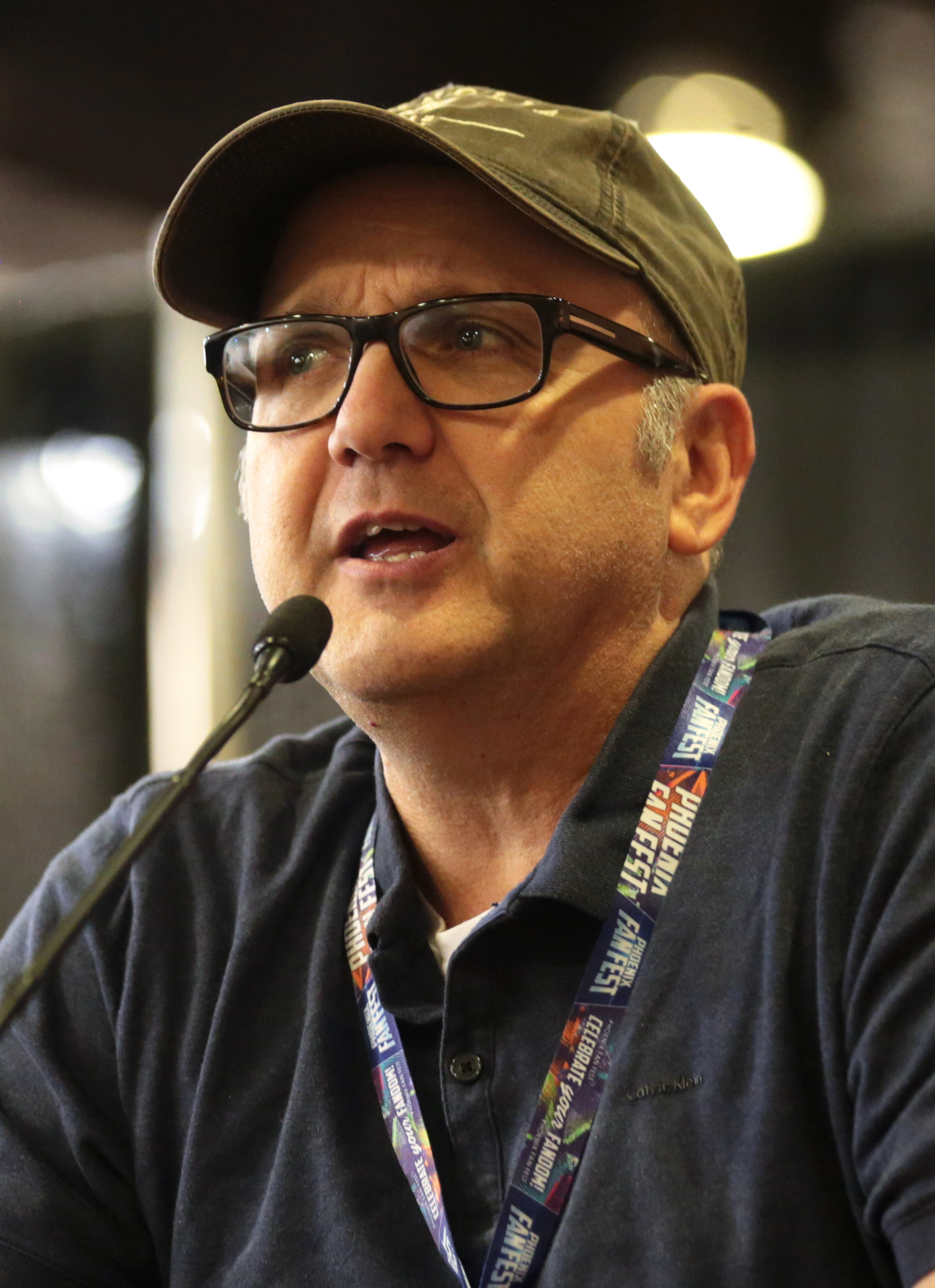
Paris Themmen

Paris Themmen, a former child actor known for playing Mike Teevee in Willy Wonka & the Chocolate Factory (1971), appeared on Jeopardy! as a regular contestant on March 13, 2018, finishing in second place. His wife, Nikki Grillos (whom he married in 2014), previously appeared on the program in 2015, returning twice as a champion before being defeated on her third appearance.

=== Jackie Fuchs ===
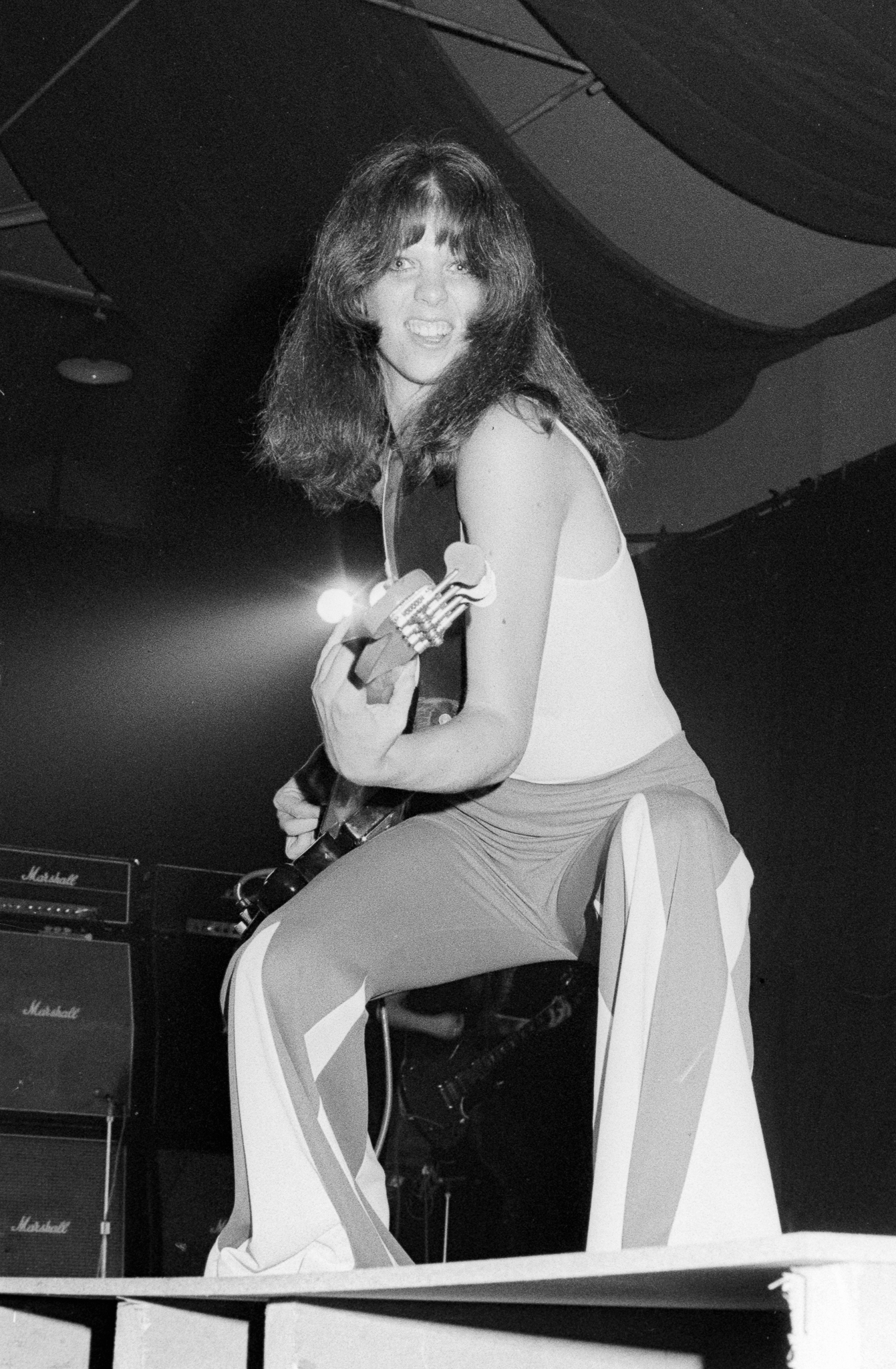
Jackie Fuchs

Jackie Fuchs, an attorney and former musician who was a bassist for The Runaways under her stage name Jackie Fox, appeared on Jeopardy! as a regular contestant in December 2018. She won four games, accumulating $87,089 in winnings.

=== James Holzhauer ===
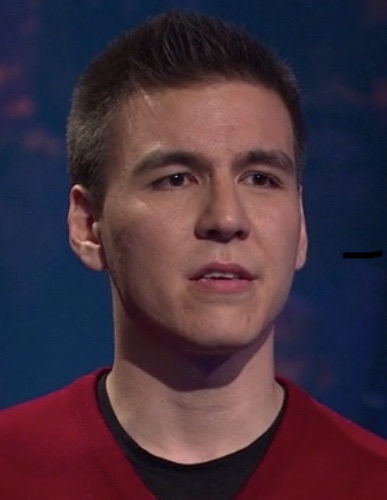
James Holzhauer

James Holzhauer, a professional sports gambler from Las Vegas, Nevada, and a native of Naperville, Illinois, set the single-game Jeopardy! winnings record of $110,914 during his fourth appearance on the show in April 2019, beating the previous record of $77,000 held by Roger Craig. He eclipsed his own record on April 17 with a final single-game total of $131,127. He holds the top 16 single-game winnings records. At $25,000, he also exceeded Philip Tiu's prior record of $19,000 for largest successful Daily Double wager. At $60,013, he exceeded his own prior record of $38,314 for largest successful Final Jeopardy wager of all time.

Before Holzhauer, the record for largest successful Final Jeopardy wager was $34,000, held by Austin Rogers. His $298,687 total winnings across his first five days also surpassed the five-day record set in 1990 by Frank Spangenberg (when adjusted for the changes in the values of the clues)—the only contestant to do so. He is now the second-highest winning contestant in regular game (non-tournament) winnings, surpassed only by Ken Jennings. In addition to an aggressive wagering strategy, Holzhauer also goes for the highest values on the board first to amass his totals quickly, making it more difficult for his opponents to catch up, and increasing the money he has available to wager when he hits a Daily Double.

Holzhauer lost on June 3, 2019, to Emma Boettcher, making his 32 wins the fourth-longest streak in show history, and his total winnings of $2,462,216 are the second-highest in regular-season play. Holzhauer also had won the third-most money overall on the show as of June 6, 2019, and counting winnings on all game shows, is third overall after winning the Tournament of Champions in a rematch with Boettcher. He then went on to participate in the Jeopardy! The Greatest of All Time primetime event, winning one of four matches and finishing second overall behind Jennings.

Holzhauer has a Bachelor of Science in liberal arts & sciences major in mathematics from the University of Illinois at Urbana-Champaign, where he graduated in 2005. Before his performance on Jeopardy!, Holzhauer was on two other television game shows: The Chase on September 2, 2014, and 500 Questions on May 22, 2015. Of the two shows, he had the greater success on The Chase. In the final Chase round (as team leader with two other contestants participating), Holzhauer defeated Mark Labbett ("The Beast") with a score of 26–9, splitting a prize of $175,000 with his team.

=== Adam Stone ===
Adam Stone, a professor and political scientist from Marietta, Georgia, appeared as a contestant in May 2019 in which he went up against James Holzhauer, finishing in third.

=== Emma Boettcher ===
Emma Boettcher, a 27-year-old University of Chicago librarian, supplanted James Holzhauer as Jeopardy! champion on June 3, 2019, preventing him from surpassing the $2.52 million Ken Jennings earned during his 2004 winning streak. Boettcher was the highest-winning female contestant in any single game of Jeopardy! with $46,801, surpassing the $46,600 Maria Wenglinsky earned on November 1, 2005. She won three games, for a total of $98,002. Boettcher's performance was unusual in that most contestants who upset a long-running champion lose in their next episode; only Jonathan Fisher (who defeated 38-game champion Matt Amodio) had greater success than Boettcher following the defeat of someone who had won more than 10 games.

Boettcher said she would use her first-day winnings to pay off student loans and give back to the University of North Carolina at Chapel Hill School of Information and Library Science, where she received her master's degree in information science in 2016. Her master's paper for that degree, "Predicting the Difficulty of Trivia Questions Using Text Features", relied on Jeopardy! clues. Boettcher received her bachelor's degree in English from Princeton in 2014. She has worked at the University of Chicago as a user experience resident librarian since August 2016, with her focus on faculty and student experiences with the university's library services. She auditioned for the Jeopardy! College Championship while at Princeton, but was not selected.

Boettcher was granted a wild-card invitation to the 2019 Tournament of Champions, partly to set up a potential rematch with Holzhauer and partly because one of the automatic qualifiers, 2018 Teachers Tournament winner Larry Martin, died before reaching the tournament. Boettcher advanced to the finals of the tournament, landing a rematch with Holzhauer. She split the two-game final with him but lost by a larger margin in the first game, finishing as first runner-up with a $100,000 prize.

=== Jason Zuffranieri ===
Jason Zuffranieri (/ˌzʌfrəˈnɛəriː/), a 43-year-old math teacher at Albuquerque Academy in Albuquerque, New Mexico, won 19 games in a row, with total winnings of $532,496. He lost his 20th game on September 26, 2019, to Gabe Brison-Trezise, who prevented him from accumulating enough money to have a guaranteed win going into Final Jeopardy. Brison-Trezise gave the correct response to Final Jeopardy while Zuffranieri did not, relegating him to second place and $2,000.

With his performance, Zuffranieri became the fourth-winningest contestant in regular-season play, and moved into fifth place for most consecutive games won, tied with Madden and behind only Jennings, Holzhauer, Matt Amodio and Julia Collins.

Zuffranieri is originally from Depew, New York, where much of his family still resides. He moved to Albuquerque during his childhood and was previously a rocket scientist before becoming a teacher. He tried out for the show eight times before being selected to participate. He returned for the 2021 Tournament of Champions and became a wildcard semifinalist after contestant Ryan Bilger won in a runaway game, but lost the semifinal match to Jennifer Quail, thus taking home a $10,000 consolation prize.

=== Jennifer Quail ===
Jennifer Quail, a wine tasting consultant and published author from Dowagiac, Michigan, won $228,800 during her eight appearances on the show, making her the second-most successful female contestant in terms of money won and consecutive appearances in regular play – behind Julia Collins and ahead of Larissa Kelly. She lost on her ninth appearance, finishing in second place, with a consolation prize of $2,000. Quail appeared in the 2021 Tournament of Champions, finishing as the first runner-up to winner Sam Kavanaugh.

=== MacKenzie Jones ===
MacKenzie Jones, a program development director from Tulsa, Oklahoma, won $204,808 in eight appearances on the show. She was the fourth female contestant to win eight or more games and the fourth female contestant to win $200,000 or more in regular play. On her third appearance, Jones tied Boettcher's highest single-game total for a female contestant during regular play at $46,801, beating her opponent on that day by $1. She lost on her ninth appearance, finishing in second place, earning an additional $2,000. She returned for the 2021 Tournament of Champions, but failed to win her first match, taking home a consolation prize of $5,000.

=== Brayden Smith ===
Brayden Smith, a policy intern from Las Vegas, Nevada, won $115,798 in five appearances on the show. He was the final five-game champion of the Trebek era. Smith was known for his uncanny ability to find Daily Doubles as he found (and answered correctly) all nine Daily Doubles in the first three games of his run. On February 5, 2021, Smith died suddenly and unexpectedly at age 24, and his family set up a donation fund in his name, which Jeopardy! ended up donating to, as was revealed in the 2021 Tournament of Champions.

== 2021–present ==
=== Matt Amodio ===
Matt Amodio, a PhD student in computer science at Yale University and a native of Medina County, Ohio, won $1,518,601 during his 38 consecutive wins on the show, making him the third millionaire contestant (based on regular-season play) after Jennings and Holzhauer. He is the third-highest earner of all time in regular-season play, has won the third-highest number of consecutive games, and is the fourth-biggest all-time winner. During season 37, Amodio qualified as the second seed in the next Tournament of Champions. Amodio is noted for his strategy of consistently prefacing his responses with "What's" instead of adjusting the interrogative pronoun to fit the response. He chose this method because Jeopardy! rules allow any question containing the correct response to be used; by not having to adjust the pronoun, he has one less thing to think about when formulating a response, potentially speeding response time. He has credited Wikipedia's format for allowing him to meander through various topics in a random but logical progression and learn content quickly. His 38-game winning streak is often called "The Amodio Rodeo".

=== Jonathan Fisher ===
Jonathan Fisher, an actor originally from Coral Gables, Florida, won $246,100 in 11 wins on Jeopardy!, losing his 12th appearance. He ended Amodio's 38-game streak on October 11, 2021. During season 38, he qualified as the second seed in the next Tournament of Champions until Amy Schneider surpassed him on December 1, 2021. Fisher was the first contestant to have a winning streak of at least ten games after defeating another champion who also won at least ten games. He became the 11th contestant to achieve ten wins. His winning streak ended on October 26, 2021, when he lost to Nancy Donehower.

=== Amy Schneider ===
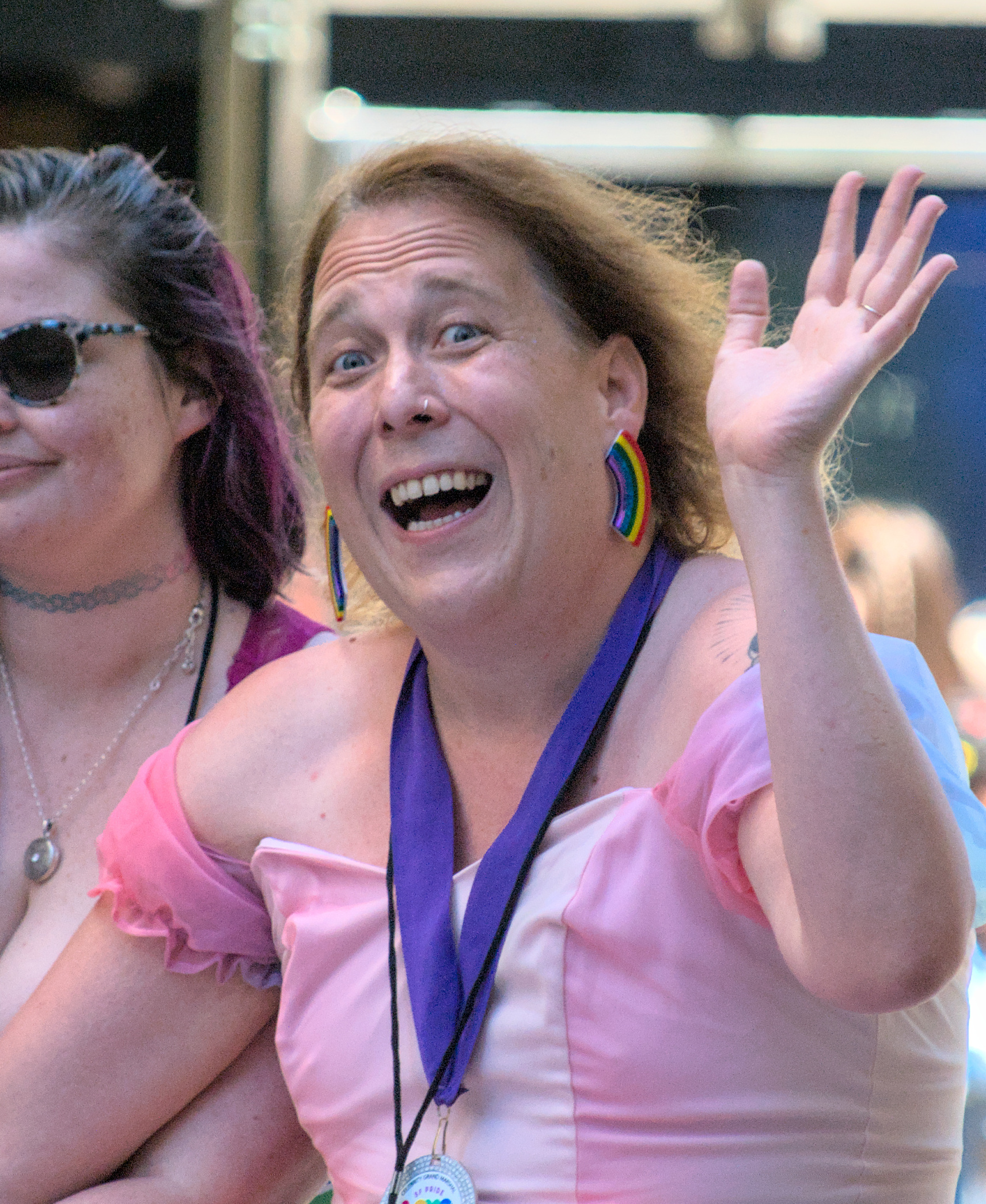
Schneider in 2022

Amy Schneider, an engineering manager from Oakland, California, won $1,382,800 and 40 games in a row, the second-longest winning streak in Jeopardy!'s history and the fourth-highest winnings in regular-season play. Schneider is the fifth-biggest all-time winner, and the fourth regular-season millionaire (after Jennings, Holzhauer, and Amodio), while being the first transgender and female one. During season 38, she qualified as the first seed in the next Tournament of Champions. On November 21, she won the tournament, along with its $250,000 grand prize. She was the first openly transgender person to compete in, and to win, the Jeopardy! Tournament of Champions. Of the significance of her gender identity, she said: "The fact is, I don't actually think about being trans all that often, and so when appearing on national television, I wanted to represent that part of my identity accurately: as important, but also relatively minor."

=== Sam Buttrey ===
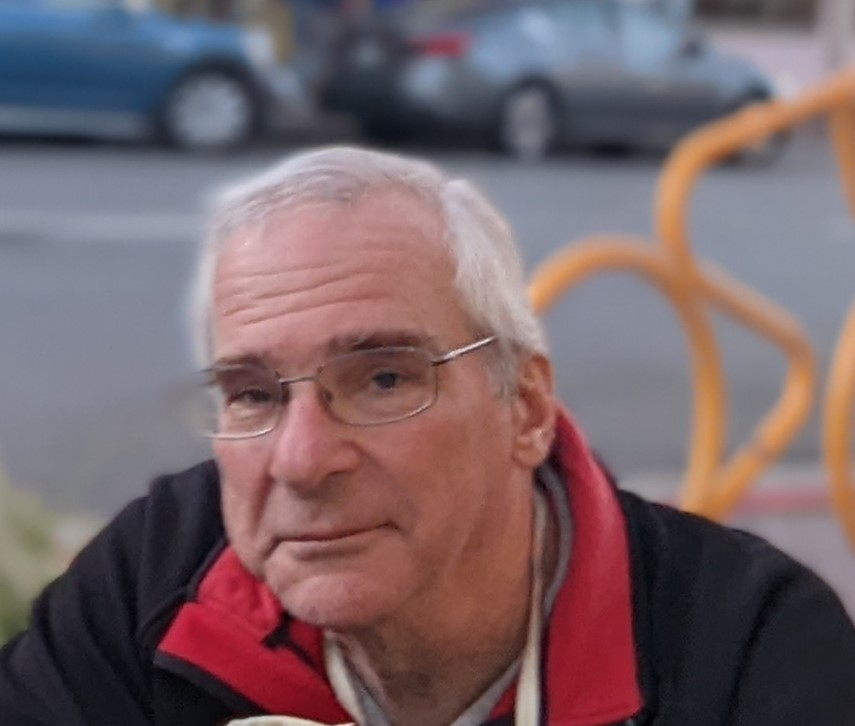
Sam Buttrey

Sam Buttrey is a podcaster, bon vivant, and retired Associate Professor of Operations Research at the Naval Postgraduate School living in Pacific Grove, California. He won $100,000 in the 2021 Jeopardy Professors Tournament and a spot in the 2022 Tournament of Champions. Buttrey appeared in the 2022 Tournament of Champions and finished third behind Andrew He and Amy Schneider.

=== Mattea Roach ===
Mattea Roach, a tutor living in Toronto, Ontario, and originally from Halifax, Nova Scotia, won 23 games in a row (moving them into fifth place for the most consecutive games won in show history) with their run ending on May 6, 2022, having won US$560,983 (sixth in show history). They are the longest-running and highest-earning Canadian champion in Jeopardy! history. Roach was seeded third in the 2022 Tournament of Champions, behind Amy Schneider and Matt Amodio.

=== Ryan Long ===
Ryan Long won 16 games in May and June 2022, and $299,400. He lost his 17th game to future six-day winner and 2022 Tournament of Champions semifinalist Eric Ahasic. Ryan also appeared in the 2022 Tournament of Champions, losing in the quarterfinals to Maureen O'Neil. His previous jobs include dishwasher, water ice truck driver, piano delivery guy, airport security worker, supermarket cashier, bouncer, street sweeper, warehouse laborer, package handler, office clerk, CCT operator, and rideshare driver.

=== Cris Pannullo ===
Cris Pannullo, a customer success operations manager from Ocean City, New Jersey, won $748,286 during his 21 appearances in October, November and December 2022. His games were interrupted by the Tournament of Champions and Second Chance Tournament. Pannullo was defeated on the December 6, 2022 episode by Andy Tirrell.

=== Andrew Tirrell ===
Andrew Tirrell, professor of political science and international relations from San Diego, California, won $67,399 during six appearances, including regular season contests in December of 2022, and appearances in the 2024 Champions Wildcard Tournament. Tirrell defeated 21-game champion Cris Pannullo on December 6, 2022, and won $50,000 as runner-up to Juveria Zaheer in the Champions Wildcard. He served as the alternate for the 2024 Tournament of Champions. During his first-day Jeopardy! contestant chat, Tirrell discussed the fisheries research he conducted in Arctic Norway, while his second-day contestant chat revealed his plans to use part of his winnings to start backyard beekeeping with his son, Theo.

=== Hannah Wilson ===
Hannah Wilson, a data scientist from Chicago, Illinois, won $229,801 during her eight appearances in May 2023, and has qualified for the Tournament of Champions. Hannah has identified herself as transgender and has cited Amy Schneider as an inspiration to compete on the show.

=== Ben Chan ===
Ben Chan, a philosophy professor from Green Bay, Wisconsin, won $252,600 during his nine appearances in April and May 2023, and has qualified for the Tournament of Champions. All nine of his wins were runaway victories.

=== Adriana Harmeyer ===
Adriana Harmeyer, an archivist in West Lafayette, Indiana, from Huntington, West Virginia, won $351,600 during her 15-day win-streak in June and qualified three times over for the Tournament of Champions. On June 19, Drew Basile from Birmingham, Michigan defeated Harmeyer to end her historic run.

=== Jay Fisher ===
Jay Fisher, a former appointed State Senator from Illinois for 22 hours, defeated nine-day champion Issac Hirsch and won $31,200 before losing on his fourth appearance.

=== Scott Riccardi ===
Scott Riccardi, an engineer from Somerville, New Jersey, won $455,000 during his 16-day winning streak, including $3,000 for finishing second in the season 41 finale.

=== Paolo Pasco ===
Paolo Pasco

Paolo Pasco, a puzzle writer from San Diego, California, won $195,717 during his 7-day winning streak. With his performance, he earned a berth in the Tournament of Champions in February 2026, where he swept the finals to win the $250,000 grand prize. The victory gave him a berth in that year's Jeopardy! Masters, where he placed fourth, behind Andrew He, Victoria Groce, and Yogesh Raut, and received $100,000.

=== Harrison Whitaker ===
Harrison Whitaker, a researcher from Terre Haute, Indiana, won $373,999 over the course of his 14-day winning streak, from November 11 to December 1, 2025.

=== Jamie Ding ===
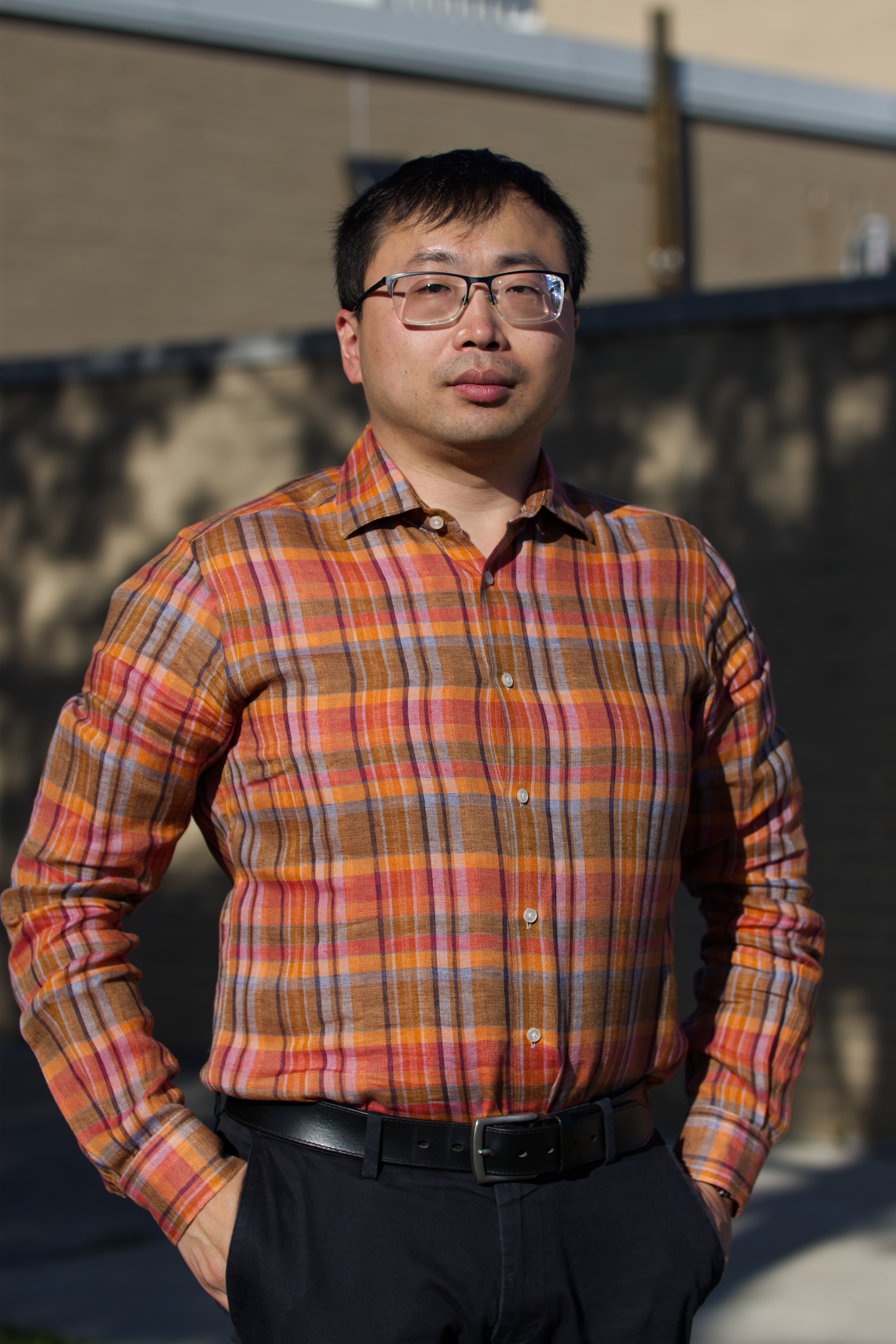
Jamie Ding

Jamie Ding is a public-sector professional and weekend law student from Lawrenceville, New Jersey. On March 17, 2026, he set the record for the highest Coryat score in Jeopardy! history at $42,400. On April 9, 2026, he tied the record held by Ken Jennings for the most correct responses in one game at 45. On April 27, 2026, his 31-game winning streak came to an end when he was defeated by chess player Greg Shahade in a runaway game, finishing with winnings over $880,000 – the fifth longest winning streak and fifth highest winnings in regular play, behind Jennings, Schneider, Amodio, and Holzhauer.

=== Tini Howard ===
Tini Howard

Tini Howard, a comic book writer from Van Nuys, California, appeared as a one-day contestant on April 17, 2026, being defeated by Jamie Ding in his 26th consecutive game and finishing in third place.

=== Greg Shahade ===
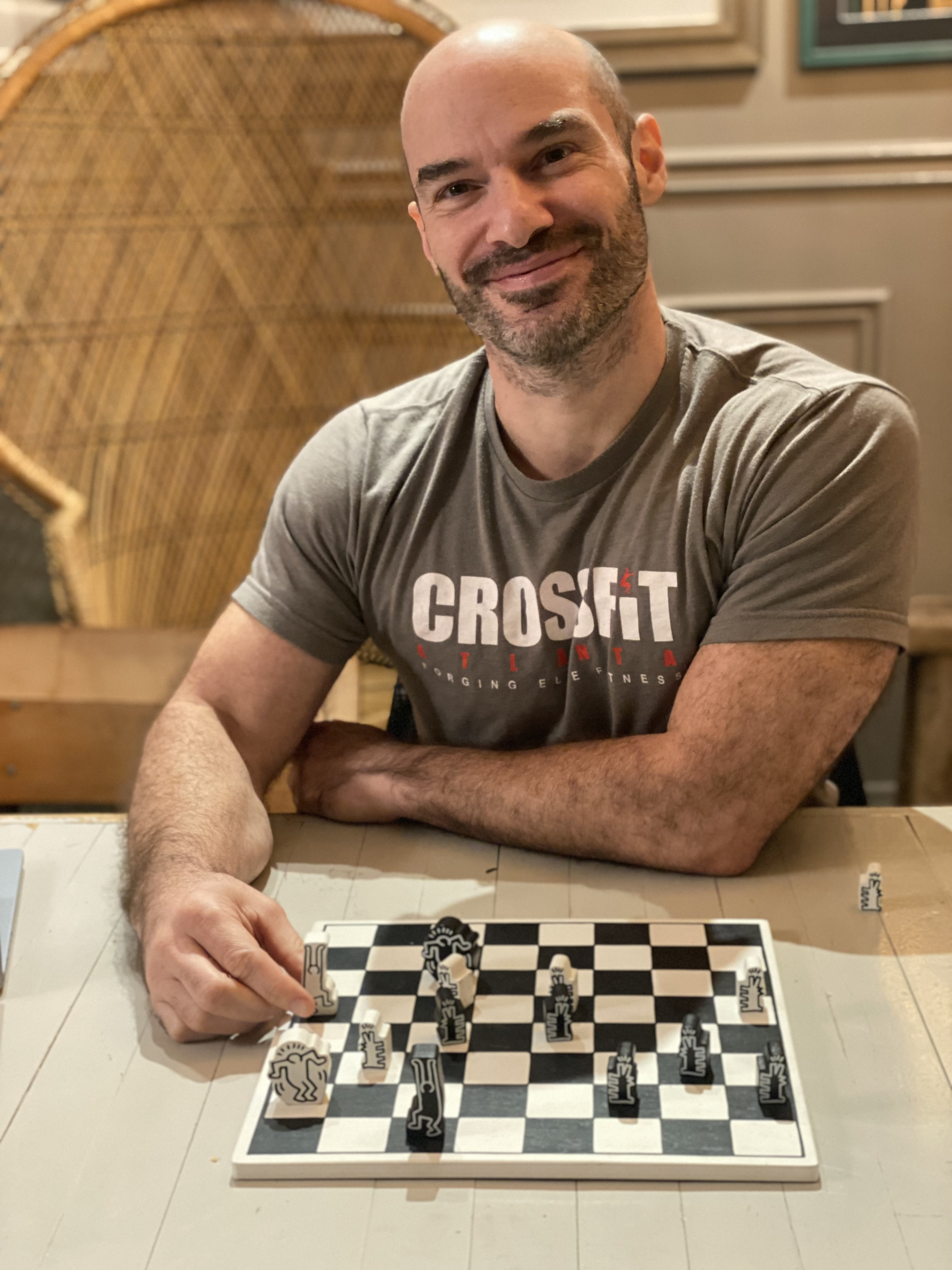
Greg Shahade

Gregory Shahade, an International Master of chess, appeared as a regular contestant in April 2026 in which in his first game, which aired on April 27, defeated Jamie Ding, the fifth-longest reigning champion in Jeopardy! history who had just won 31 games in a row. Shahade won two more games before losing his fourth game on April 30 to novelist Kate Brody.

== See also ==
- Strategies and skills of Jeopardy! champions
