= Larissa Kelly =

American writer and academic

- Born: February 10, 1980 (age 46)
- Education: Newton North High School; Princeton University; University of California, Berkeley (PhD)
- Occupations: Writer; academic
- Spouse: Jeff Hoppes (m. 2002)
- Writing career
- Genre: Science fiction

Larissa Kelly (born February 10, 1980) is an American writer and academic who is known for her six-game streak on the U.S. game show Jeopardy!.

== Biography ==
Kelly grew up in Newton, Massachusetts, and attended Newton North High School where she helped lead the science bowl team to national competition. Kelly graduated from Princeton University in 2002 and completed a Ph.D. at the University of California, Berkeley, studying the history of archaeology in 19th century Mexico. She played quiz bowl at both Princeton and Berkeley. On August 3, 2002, Kelly married her quiz bowl teammate Jeff Hoppes. On the All Star games draft show in 2018, she mentioned that her husband attended high school with Brad Rutter.

Kelly is one of three members of her family to have played on Jeopardy!, all between 2004 and 2008, and the only winner of the three. Her husband was defeated by Ken Jennings in Jennings' 70th game as champion. Her sister Arianna was defeated in her initial Jeopardy! appearance, in part due to questionable calls that prompted Standards and Practices to bring her back for a second appearance; in her second appearance, Arianna was defeated by Aaron Schroeder, who later faced Larissa in the 2009 Jeopardy! Tournament of Champions finals.

In the 2009 Jeopardy! Tournament of Champions in Las Vegas, Kelly won her quarterfinal and semifinal matches and led after the first game of the two-game finals, with $24,400 to Dan Pawson's $22,301 and Schroeder's $9,600. Although Kelly led going into Final Jeopardy! in the second game, she lost to Pawson after incorrectly responding to the clue which required identifying George II of Great Britain as the last British ruler to be born outside the United Kingdom. Kelly won $100,000 for finishing second.

Kelly is a science fiction author, who has had one story published at Strange Horizons.

== Appearances on Jeopardy! ==
Including tournament winnings, Kelly set the Jeopardy! record for money won by a female contestant at $660,930 and is third to Julia Collins in Jeopardy! winnings outside tournament play. During her regular run on Jeopardy!, Kelly won a total of $222,597 over six games and $1,000 3rd place consolation prize in her seventh, with her last appearance airing May 28, 2008. Excluding tournament winnings, Kelly is the fourth-highest winning female contestant and ranks seventh all-time in Jeopardy! earnings.

While she was champion, Kelly broke Ken Jennings's record for most money won in a contestant's first five days by winning $179,797; this record was one of two Roger Craig broke during his reign as champion, as he won $195,801 in his first five games (Craig also topped Jennings's single-game record of $75,000). (Note: These scores were achieved after Jeopardy! doubled its clue values in 2001; if earlier scores are doubled to account for this, Craig, Kelly, and Jennings all trail Frank Spangenberg, whose adjusted total is $205,194. Jerome Vered's adjusted total of $193,602 is third to Spangenberg and Craig.) Kelly is also the third-highest winning female contestant in any single game in Jeopardy!'s history. Kelly's $45,200 performance narrowly trails Maria Wenglinsky, who won $46,600 on November 1, 2005, Emma Boettcher, MacKenzie Jones, who both won $46,801 on June 3, 2019, and February 19, 2020, respectively, and Amy Schneider, who won $50,000, $61,800, and $71,400 on November 25, 2021, December 2, 2021, and January 20, 2022, respectively.

Kelly returned to participate in the Jeopardy! Battle of the Decades tournament in 2014, but was eliminated in the first round, winning $5,000. She also appeared on Jeopardy! All Star Games in February 2019, as a member of Team Brad Rutter with David Madden; her team won and split $1,000,000.

=== Jeopardy! records ===
During her time as champion, Kelly set several records, which have since been surpassed:

- Highest five-game total, winning $179,797 (later surpassed by Roger Craig, who won $195,801, then by James Holzhauer, who won $298,687)
- Highest total winnings by a female player in non-tournament play, winning $222,597 (later surpassed by Julia Collins, who has won $428,100,)
- Longest streak (from first appearance) of correct Final Jeopardy! responses, with 10 (later surpassed by Ben Ingram, who had 12 correct responses)
- Longest winning streak on Jeopardy! by a female player in non-tournament play, winning six games (later surpassed by Stephanie Jass, who won seven games, then by Julia Collins, who won 20 games)
