= Arthur Chu =

American television personality (born 1984)

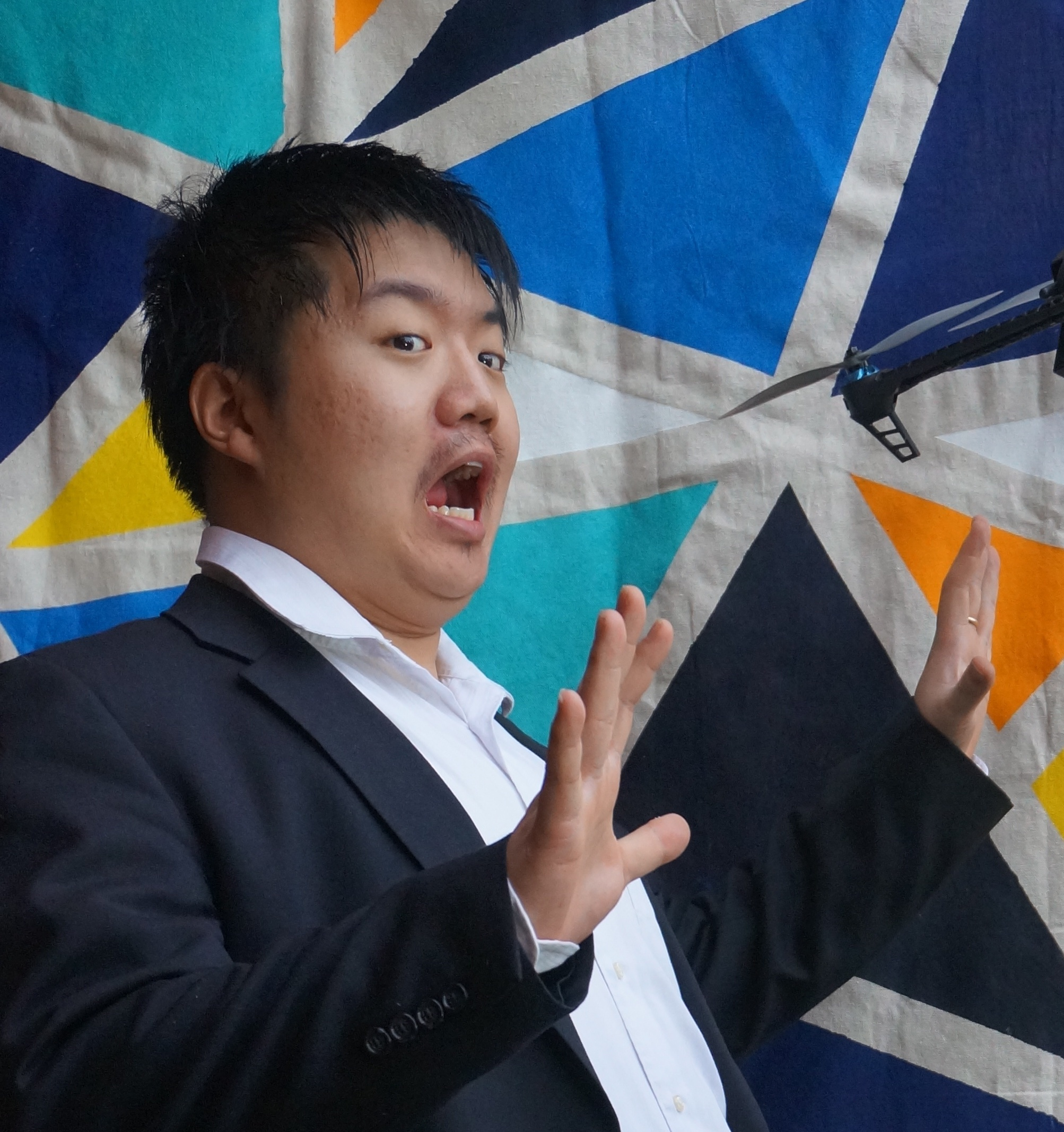
- Chu in 2015
- Born: January 30, 1984 (age 42); Albany, New York, U.S.
- Education: Swarthmore College (BA)
- Occupation: Columnist
- Known for: Jeopardy! strategy
- Spouse: Eliza Blair (m. 2012; div. 2016)

Arthur Chu (born January 30, 1984) is an American columnist and former contestant on Jeopardy!, a syndicated U.S. game show. He first became known for the unusual style of play that he adopted during his 11-game winning streak on the show. When his appearances aired, Chu attracted criticism from many for jumping from category to category rather than selecting clues in sequential order, a strategy known as the "Forrest Bounce", named for former champion Chuck Forrest.

Chu prepared extensively before his Jeopardy! appearance by reviewing tapes, study guides, game theory and Jeopardy! strategy. Chu made his debut on January 28, 2014, winning $37,000 in his first game. After winning 11 games, Chu lost his 12th game (which aired on March 12) to Diana Peloquin. He is the tenth highest-earning Jeopardy! champion in non-tournament gameplay, with a grand total of $298,200. Chu also won an additional $100,000 for taking second place in the 2014 Tournament of Champions.

Since his appearances on Jeopardy!, Chu has used his fame to speak out publicly on issues that are important to him. Chu later became a columnist and Internet commentator, writing for The Daily Beast and Salon on various issues, including racism and sexism in nerd culture.

== Early life and education ==
Chu was born to a Taiwanese American family in Albany, New York, on January 30, 1984. His parents immigrated to the United States from Taiwan. Growing up, Chu moved several times due to his father's job in the chemical industry. During his childhood, Chu lived in Cranston, Rhode Island and spent a year in Boise, Idaho before living in Cerritos, California as a teenager.

As a child, Chu participated in the National Geographic Bee and was a member of the quiz-bowl team during his time as an undergraduate at Swarthmore College. Chu graduated from Swarthmore with a Bachelor of Arts in history in 2008.

== Jeopardy! appearances ==
=== Preparation ===
Chu spent a great deal of time preparing in the month before his first appearance on Jeopardy!. He studied tapes of former Jeopardy! contestants and created study guides based on the advice of Roger Craig. Chu also read about game theory and Jeopardy! strategy online. As a student at Swarthmore College, he also played quiz bowl, where he has said that he was an aggressive player despite having limited knowledge.

=== Debut and championship ===
Chu made his debut as a contestant on the January 28, 2014, episode of Jeopardy!, winning $37,200 in his first game. In the next episode the following day, Chu made a Final Jeopardy! wager that caused him to tie fellow contestant Carolyn Collins. Chu claimed that he made the decision to wager for a tie not out of kindness, but because of the advice of 2003 College champion Keith Williams, who claims that game theory favors wagering for a tie over the more common practice of wagering to win by a dollar. Chu defeated Collins on the January 30 episode.

After a three-week airtime break, Chu became eligible for the Tournament of Champions on February 24 when he won for the fifth time; his total winnings were $123,600. Two days later, Chu became the ninth biggest all-time Jeopardy! winner, with a total of $180,000. The next day, he jumped to third, with a total of $238,200.

Chu won his eleventh and final game on March 11, bringing his total to $297,200. His streak ended the next day when he was defeated by Diana Peloquin. Chu ended up in third place after losing his entire score in Final Jeopardy!, and his third-place earnings of $1,000 brought his ultimate winnings to $298,200. (Note: Since May 16, 2002, consolation prizes have been $2,000 for the second-place contestant and $1,000 for the third-place contestant.) This put Chu at third place on the list of all-time highest-earning Jeopardy! champions, behind Ken Jennings and David Madden. He also held the third-longest winning streak in the series' history, behind the same two gentlemen.

After his initial appearance on the show, Chu competed in the 2014 Jeopardy! Tournament of Champions, where he finished second to Ben Ingram, an IT consultant from South Carolina. Chu won $100,000 for his second-place finish, bringing his overall winnings to $398,200.

=== Response to game play style ===
Throughout Chu's 11-game streak, his aggressive style of play attracted criticism among fans of the series, some of whom considered his conduct to be unsportsmanlike and against the spirit of Jeopardy!. Chu's strategy earned him the nickname the "Jeopardy! Villain", a nickname Chu fully embraced. One of the most common complaints about his playing style was that he jumped from category to category, a strategy known as the "Forrest Bounce", after former champion Chuck Forrest. However, the Forrest Bounce is a somewhat common strategy since it was employed by several other successful champions, including Brad Rutter and James Holzhauer, who, like Chu, used it to increase their odds of finding Daily Doubles first. Inspired by Watson, a computer that was programmed to play Jeopardy!, Chu picked high-value clues first because they are more likely to be Daily Doubles. In his second game, Chu wagered $5 on a Daily Double and responded "I don't know" immediately after the clue was given.

Chu also held the buzzer close to the microphone, resulting in audible clicks when signaling, and upon correctly answering a question, rushed quickly to the next clue. This gamesmanship, the resulting criticism and his engagement with critics on Twitter during airings of his shows led some to declare his run akin to a "Moneyball" moment, and Chu himself "ruthless" and "idol-killingly pragmatic".

In response, both Alex Trebek and Ken Jennings have defended Chu as a "good player" who makes the game "more exciting". In a 2018 interview, Trebek admitted that Chu's use of the Forrest Bounce could be irritating when it disrupted the flow of the game, although he also praised Chu and said, "as the impartial host I accept disorder".

== After Jeopardy! ==
After his appearance on Jeopardy!, Chu contacted publicists and PR firms to ask for suggestions on how to monetize the recognition from his Jeopardy! run. However, he found the proposals unappealing and did not follow suggestions that he use the "successful game theorist" image. Instead, Chu began writing a column for The Daily Beast and later for Salon. He has written on various aspects of nerd culture and on being Asian American. Chu is a vocal critic of racism and online bullying, and is known for his opposition to the Gamergate movement.

A documentary feature film about Chu's life, titled Who Is Arthur Chu?, premiered at the 2017 Slamdance Film Festival. It is directed by Scott Drucker and Yu Gu.

== Personal life ==
Chu resides in Broadview Heights, Ohio. He has worked as a voice actor, for example, on the webcomic Erfworld, and as an insurance compliance analyst.

Chu married science fiction writer Eliza Blair in 2012; they met during their time at Swarthmore College. They got divorced in 2016.

== Footnotes ==
Preceded by Helen Juvonen	Biggest one-day winners on Jeopardy! by season 2013–2014	Succeeded by Michael Bilow
Preceded by Keith Whitener	Jeopardy! Tournament of Champions first runner-up 2014	Succeeded by Matt Jackson
