= Julia Collins (game show contestant) =

American game show contestant (born 1982)

- Born: November 10, 1982 (age 43)
- Known for: Jeopardy!
- Spouse: Roger Craig

Julia Collins (born November 10, 1982) is an American game show contestant who became a 20-day champion on Jeopardy! in 2014. She held the record for most consecutive wins by a female contestant until Amy Schneider surpassed her on December 29, 2021. During her run from April 21 to June 2, 2014, Collins won $429,100, which was, at the time, the third highest winnings total from regular play in Jeopardy! history.

== Early life ==
Collins is a native of Wilmette, Illinois. In 2001, she graduated from The Madeira School in McLean, Virginia. Collins earned bachelor's degrees in art history and history from Wellesley College in 2005, and a master's degree in logistics and supply chain management engineering from the Massachusetts Institute of Technology in 2010.

== Jeopardy! ==
Collins began her original run on April 21, 2014. She won $428,100 over 20 consecutive victories from between April 21 and May 30. On June 2, Collins' run came to an end as she was defeated by challenger Brian Loughnane. Collins finished the game in third place after wagering her entire daily total in Final Jeopardy! and failing to provide a correct response. Her third place consolation prize of $1,000 was added to her winnings to give her a total of $429,100 – at the time, this was the third highest total earnings in Jeopardy! regular play history, only trailing Ken Jennings and David Madden, a record she held until being surpassed by James Holzhauer in May 2019. In the cash category, Collins would once again be surpassed by Jason Zuffranieri in September 2019. Collins remained in the top 10 highest earning contestants until being surpassed by Jamie Ding in April 2026, making her the 11th-highest scoring contestant as of May 2026.

At the time of her appearance, Collins also held the record for the second-highest number of games won on Jeopardy! trailing only behind Jennings (who won 74 games in 2004) and just ahead of Madden (who won 19 games in 2005). She held this record until being surpassed by James Holzhauer, who won 32 consecutive games between April and June 2019, giving her the fourth longest winning streak. Collins would later be surpassed by Matt Amodio in September 2021, Amy Schneider in December 2021, Mattea Roach in May 2022, Cris Pannullo in December 2022 and Jamie Ding in April 2026. Collins is now the eighth-highest in number of consecutive Jeopardy! games won as of May 2026 and the highest for a cisgender woman.

Collins was invited to the 2014 Jeopardy! Tournament of Champions, where she finished second in her quarterfinal game behind Joshua Brakhage, but reached the semifinals as a wild card. Collins then won her semifinal game, advancing to the finals, where she finished third behind winner Ben Ingram and second-place finisher Arthur Chu.

In the 2018 All-Star Games draft show, Collins still remains friends with Ben Ingram and picked him as her first pick and Seth Wilson for her second pick. In 2019, they finished in third place in the second match against Team Ken and Team Austin and split $50,000.

== Personal life ==
Collins is married to Roger Craig, who won the Jeopardy! Tournament of Champions in 2011. Craig announced this on the February 21, 2025, episode of Jeopardy! on which Roger won the quarterfinal game of the Jeopardy! invitational tournament. As of 2025, Collins resides in Arlington, Virginia.
