= Jerome Vered =

American writer and game show contestant

- Born: March 13, 1958 (age 68)
- Occupations: Writer; game show contestant

Jerome Vered (born March 13, 1958) is a Studio City, California writer, publicly known for his record-setting success as a contestant on the U.S. television game show Jeopardy!

== Biography ==
Vered graduated from Harvard College and the USC School of Cinema-Television. He took the Jeopardy test four times (in 1987, 1988, 1989, and 1990) before being called to the show as an alternate in March 1991. He was not used in any of that day's tapings, but he did return the next year, and became a five-day champion, with winnings totaling $96,801, second to Frank Spangenberg's $102,597. During that run, he shattered the one-day record for dollar winnings, earning $34,000 in one episode.

After his five-day run, Vered returned for the 1992 Jeopardy! Tournament of Champions, finishing in third place and winning $7,500.

In the 2005 Ultimate Tournament of Champions, Vered won five games to advance to a three-game final match against fellow Jeopardy! record-setters Ken Jennings and Brad Rutter. Vered finished in third place, earning $250,000. Of the three finalists, he was the only one not to get a bye in the tournament, as Rutter got a bye into the second round and Jennings got a bye into the finals.

Vered again appeared on Jeopardy! on February 7, 2014, as a contestant in the Battle of the Decades tournament. He faced Tom Cubbage and Bob Verini in a "1980s bracket" game, failed to advance to the next round, winning $5,000 when he finished second to Cubbage. At that time, this placed Vered behind Rutter and Jennings, respectively, as the third highest-earning contestant in Jeopardy! history, having won a total of $359,301 across his original five wins, the 1992 Tournament of Champions, 2005's Ultimate Tournament of Champions, and 2014's Battle of the Decades.

Although Vered is best known for his Jeopardy! prowess, he has also dominated in other quiz-show formats, including Win Ben Stein's Money, during which he recorded the first-ever sweep, and became the first to take home the full $5,000 of Ben Stein's money. He would later become a researcher on the show's staff. Vered's game show winnings thus total $364,301.

In 2009, Vered was used as a Phone-a-Friend lifeline on the finale of the Who Wants to Be a Millionaire? 10th Anniversary Special when Ken Basin, from Los Angeles, CA, called him for help on his $500,000 question on the final episode of the 10th Anniversary.

In 2009, Vered became the first American to crack the top 10 at a World Quizzing Championship with an eighth-place finish.

In 2017, he competed in a Los Angeles citywide pub tournament as part of Team of Enchantment (along with Brian Fodera, Matthew Frost, Pam Mueller, Brad Rutter and Hans von Walter), taking home his share of a $10,000 prize.
