= Brad Rutter =

American game show contestant (born 1978)

- Born: Bradford Gates Rutter; January 31, 1978 (age 48); Lancaster, Pennsylvania, U.S.
- Occupations: TV host; producer; actor; game show contestant
- Known for: Being the highest-earning Jeopardy! contestant and 3rd-highest-earning American game show contestant

Bradford Gates Rutter (born January 31, 1978) is an American game show contestant, TV host, producer, and actor. With over $5.1 million in winnings, he is the third-highest-earning American game show contestant of all time, behind Ken Jennings and David Genat, and still the highest-earning contestant (primarily from special tournament events) on the U.S. syndicated game show Jeopardy! (with over $5 million).

Until the Greatest of All Time (GOAT) Tournament in 2020, Rutter had never lost a Jeopardy! match against a human opponent (though he twice trailed at the end of the first game of a two-day tournament match before coming back to win). This streak consisted of his original five-day run in 2000 (after which he retired undefeated) as well as 17 matches in five tournaments (including one as part of a team)—all of which he won. Rutter finished third in the GOAT Tournament—his first defeat overall and the second time he finished behind a human opponent.

== Early life ==
Rutter is a 1995 graduate of Manheim Township High School in Neffsville, Pennsylvania, where he was on the quiz bowl team. The team won second place at the 1994 Texaco Star National Academic Championship. Rutter is one of the 19 people to have been named to the National Academic Championship Hall of Fame in its 25-year history. At the 2005 Manheim Township High School graduation ceremony, he announced the start of a scholarship fund in memory of his late high-school quiz bowl coach, Anne Clouser.

Rutter described himself as a slacker in school and a Johns Hopkins dropout (while there, he studied English). Before his success on Jeopardy!, Rutter worked at the Lancaster Coconuts record store.

== Career ==
=== Jeopardy! ===
Rutter first appeared on Jeopardy! on October 30, 2000, when the rules stipulated that a contestant who won five consecutive days retired undefeated and was guaranteed a spot in the Tournament of Champions. Rutter retired as an undefeated five-day champion, with $55,102 in winnings. He was also awarded a choice of Chevrolet cars; he picked two Chevrolet Camaros. At the time, Jeopardy! awarded new cars to five-day undefeated champions. The rules were changed in 2003, before Ken Jennings' run of 74 consecutive days in 2004, which made Jennings the largest overall Jeopardy! money winner.

As a five-day champion, Rutter was invited to the 2001 Tournament of Champions, where he defeated other five-day champions and won the $100,000 grand prize. Rutter was invited back for the 2002 Million Dollar Masters Tournament, where he won the $1,000,000 grand prize and became the largest overall money winner in Jeopardy! history.

Rutter returned for the 2005 Ultimate Tournament of Champions, winning the tournament and $2,115,000. After his 2005 tournament win, in which he defeated Jennings and Jerome Vered in the finals, Rutter surpassed Jennings as the highest money-winner ever on American game shows. Jennings later regained his record by 2008 after appearing on various other game shows. There is a minor discrepancy between sources as to Rutter's total Jeopardy! winnings stemming from the prize structure of the Ultimate Tournament of Champions. Players who won in the first round earned $15,000, but Rutter was among nine top winners who received a first round bye. While some analysts suggest that Rutter's money totals should include $15,000 for a first round 'win' in this tournament, the official jeopardy.com website does not count it (when stating that Rutter's winnings were $3,255,102 after the completion of this tournament).

From February 14–16, 2011, the Jeopardy! IBM Challenge featured IBM's Watson facing off against Rutter and Jennings in a two-game, cumulative-total match aired over three days. It was the first ever man-versus-machine competition in Jeopardy!'s history. The computer program, equipped with a precisely timed mechanical "thumb", won handily, finishing with a $77,147 score, while Jennings took second place with a score of $24,000 over Rutter's $21,600 score. IBM donated its $1-million purse to two charities. Jennings and Rutter did likewise with half of their respective winnings of $300,000 and $200,000. Rutter donated $100,000 to the Lancaster County Community Foundation. Since this man-versus-machine matchup was an exhibition, Rutter's winnings and loss did not count towards official records.

Rutter participated in the Jeopardy! 2014 Battle of the Decades, pitting top champions from throughout the previous 30 years of Jeopardy!. He appeared in the 1990s week of the tournament. Rutter won the March 7, 2014, game against Mike Dupee and Jill Bunzendahl Chimka. He then appeared in the quarterfinals of the tournament on May 7, against Dan Pawson and Mark M. Lowenthal and won the game in a lock. Six days later, Rutter defeated Leszek Pawlowicz and Tom Cubbage in the semifinals. On May 16, he won the tournament and $1,000,000, defeating Ken Jennings and Roger Craig in the finale after Jennings missed the Final Jeopardy! clue. With this win, Rutter regained the record as the highest money-winner on American game shows, which Jennings had held since 2008.

In 2019, Rutter teamed with fellow Jeopardy! champions Larissa Kelly and David Madden to win the Jeopardy! All-Star Games. Rutter was team captain, and they split the grand prize of $1,000,000.

Rutter competed in the Jeopardy! The Greatest of All Time event in January 2020 against Jennings and James Holzhauer and ended up winning $250,000 with a third-place finish.

Rutter competed in the 2025 Jeopardy! Masters Tournament. He did not win either of his knockout round games and finished in seventh place (out of 9), receiving $15,000 in winnings for his performance.

=== Other game show appearances ===
Rutter appeared on the U.S. game show 1 vs. 100 (as a member of "the Mob") on December 1, 2006, and again on December 8. He answered every question correctly and was one of only seven mob members to survive to the next show, as was Annie Duke. Rutter would be eliminated on the December 15 episode on a question about Jewish reggae musician Matisyahu. Rutter appeared again on February 9, 2007, and was eliminated late in a winner-takes-$250,000 "last man standing" competition, but before Ken Jennings was. Rutter was the top seed in Grand Slam but lost in the second round to Ogi Ogas, a former Who Wants to Be a Millionaire contestant.

Rutter competed in the 2010 World Quizzing Championship, where he finished 140th. Rutter was also a contestant on the sixth episode of Million Dollar Mind Game (aired on November 27, 2011), where his team won $600,000. In May 2012, Rutter did a pilot episode as a "Chaser" for an American version of the British game show The Chase. Fox network ordered two pilots for consideration in its lineup. The Chaser in the other pilot was Mark Labbett, one of the five Chasers on both the British and Australian versions of the show. Despite the show not being picked up by Fox, it was later aired by GSN, with Labbett (the Beast) as the only Chaser. Rutter was one of three chasers hired in 2020 for the ABC revival of The Chase, along with Jennings and Holzhauer.

In May 2020, Rutter appeared on a revival of Who Wants to Be a Millionaire as an in-person lifeline for celebrity contestant Catherine O'Hara. On the show, celebrities playing for charity were allowed to have an expert assist them in answering the first 10 questions—Rutter served as O'Hara's expert and helped her answer each of the 10 questions correctly. After this point, O'Hara made the decision to trade her 50:50 lifeline for the opportunity to consult Rutter once more on any of the remaining questions. She took this opportunity on the $125,000 question, which he once again helped her answer correctly. O'Hara's final total on the show was $250,000, as she chose to walk away from the $500,000 question. Rutter was one of two Jeopardy! contestants to appear on the show as a lifeline, the other being Buzzy Cohen, who was a lifeline for Hannibal Burress. In July 2025, he was once again a lifeline, this time as a Phone-a-Friend lifeline for Jennings and Matt Damon. In the same fashion as John Carpenter, they called him on the million-dollar question not for help, but rather to inform him that they were going to win the million dollars, but it was cut due to time constraints.

== Personal life ==
Until 2009, Rutter lived in Lancaster, Pennsylvania, where he hosted InQuizitive, a local broadcast quiz show for high school students. Rutter has also been a reader and judge for the high school National Academic Championship. He now lives in Los Angeles, where he is pursuing acting.

Rutter is a lifelong fan of the Philadelphia Eagles. He gave them a shout-out during the Final Jeopardy! round of the third Jeopardy! Greatest of All Time Tournament game in 2020 by wagering 4,133 points (a reference to the final score of Super Bowl LII, where the Eagles won their first Super Bowl in franchise history by defeating the New England Patriots 41–33) on a question about 21st century Oscar winners.

== See also ==
- American game show winnings records
- List of notable Jeopardy! contestants
- Strategies and skills of Jeopardy! champions
