= David Madden (Jeopardy! contestant) =

American Jeopardy! champion and director of National History Bee and Bowl

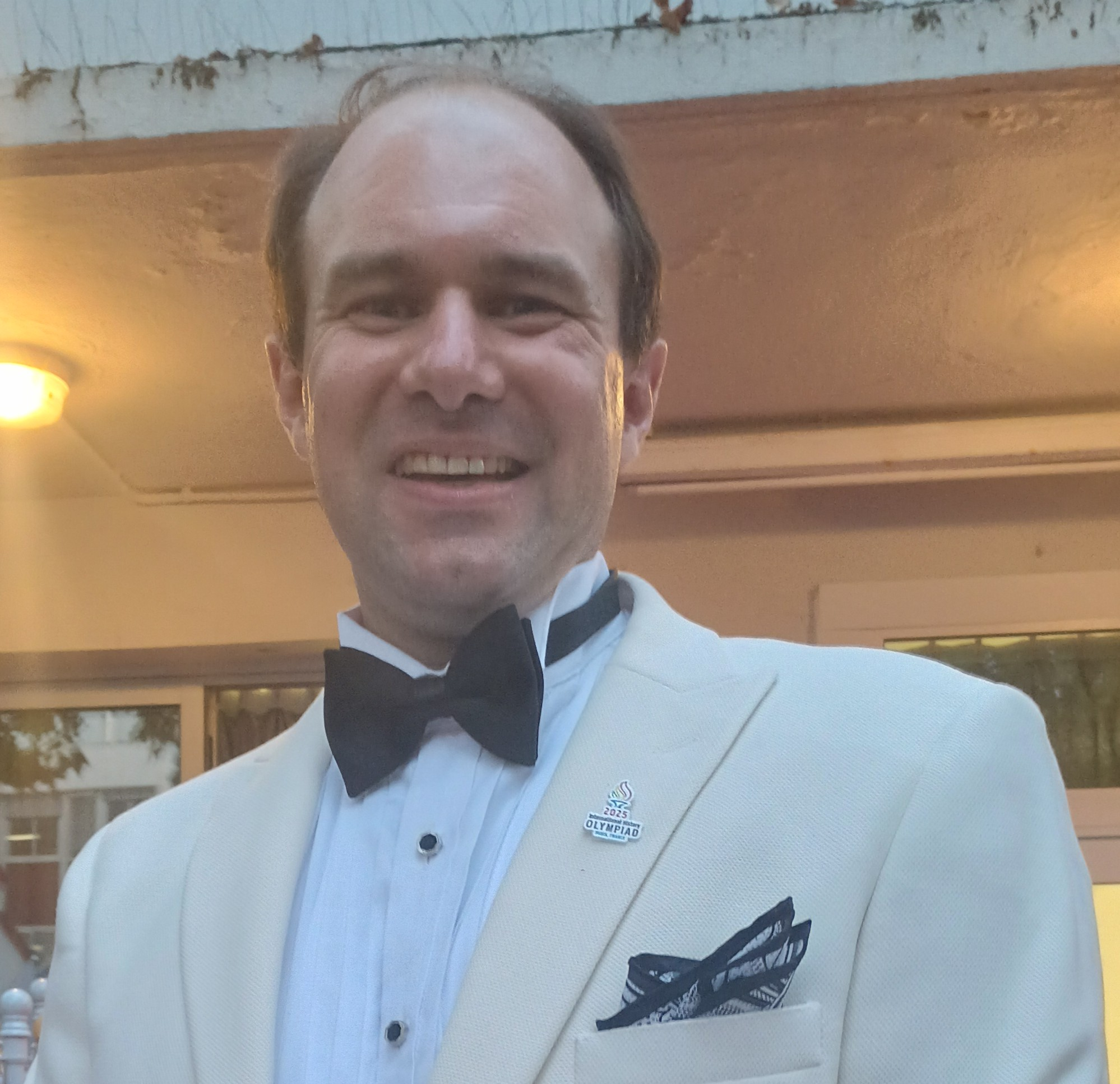
- Madden in 2025
- Born: June 13, 1981 (age 45); Ridgewood, New Jersey, U.S.
- Years active: 2005–present
- Known for: Jeopardy!
- Spouse: Nolwenn Léon (m. 2012)
- Children: 1

David Charles "Dave" Madden (born June 13, 1981) is an American game show contestant, academic competition organizer, and art historian. He is a former 19-day champion on Jeopardy! and holds the eighth-longest streak in Jeopardy! history. When Madden established his streak in 2005, it was the second-longest in Jeopardy! history, behind Ken Jennings. (Note: Since then, six other contestants have surpassed Madden's streak: Amy Schneider, Matt Amodio, James Holzhauer, Mattea Roach, Cris Pannullo, and Julia Collins. His streak has also since then been tied by Jason Zuffranieri) He defeated the IBM Watson computer during beta testing at IBM headquarters twice. He is the founder and current Executive Director of International Academic Competitions.

== Early life ==
During his time at Ridgewood High School in Ridgewood, New Jersey, Madden competed on his school's Quiz Bowl team, which he captained to a second-place finish at the 1999 National Academic Championship. Madden attended Princeton University, graduating as a Woodrow Wilson School major in 2003. He subsequently attended the Free University of Berlin and received a master's degree in international relations.

== Career ==
=== Jeopardy! ===
Making his first appearance on the July 5, 2005, episode, Madden continued on a winning streak until September 19, winning a total of 19 games and $432,400. He was defeated by Victoria Groce, a musician from Decatur, Georgia. During the 2006 Tournament of Champions, Madden won his first-round match (defeating the eventual winner of the Tournament, Michael Falk), but failed to win his semifinal match, taking home a consolation prize of $10,000 and bringing his total to $442,400.

Madden first watched Jeopardy! with a babysitter when he was 11–12 years old. Madden would get the correct response to more clues than his babysitter. Madden claims to have studied a great deal in preparation for the show. His parents did not realize that Madden was going to be on Jeopardy! until his first game aired.

Madden's streak of 19 wins in regular games was the second-longest in Jeopardy! history (after Ken Jennings). He was later surpassed by Julia Collins (20 wins in 2014), James Holzhauer (32, 2019), Matt Amodio (38, 2021), Amy Schneider (40, 2022), Mattea Roach (23, 2022), Cris Pannullo (21 games, 2022), and Jamie Ding. Madden now has the eighth-longest Jeopardy! winning streak, tied with Jason Zuffranieri. His total winnings in regular games of $432,400 were also the second-highest (after Jennings) until being surpassed by Holzhauer, Amodio, Schneider, Roach, Pannullo, and Ding. Madden currently has the eighth-highest total winnings including tournament play.

Madden was invited to take part in 2014's Battle of the Decades Jeopardy! event but declined due to contractual issues. However, he was invited and was able to participate in the 2019 Jeopardy! All-Star Games tournament, featuring 18 past champions. In September 2018, Madden was selected as the seventh out of 12 picks in the All-Star Games Draft, becoming a member of "Team Brad", led by the all-time Jeopardy! winnings leader, Brad Rutter. Their other teammate was Madden's former Princeton University Quiz Bowl teammate Larissa Kelly, who was the sixth pick in the draft.

Team Brad won their first-round match and in the final episode, airing on March 5, 2019, won the tournament and the grand prize of $1,000,000, which was split between the three team members. After Madden's share of the prize, his all-time Jeopardy! earnings totaled $775,733.33.

In 2024, Madden participated in the Jeopardy! Invitational Tournament (JIT). He won his first-round match, but failed to win his semifinal match, taking home an additional $10,000 and bringing his all-time Jeopardy! earnings to $785,733.33.

=== Other work ===
From July 2007 to February 2008, Madden hiked the length of the east coast of the United States as a fundraiser for the Fisher House Foundation, a charity that provides free accommodations for family members of veterans at American military hospitals.

In 2025, Madden appeared as a contestant on Season 3 of the American version of the game show The Floor with the category of European Geography and won $10,000, placing third overall.

Madden is also an ambassador with the Rainforest Alliance. In 2021, he launched the National Environmental Science Exam as a benefit project for the Rainforest Alliance, aiming to raise awareness and support for rainforest conservation.

Madden is a co-author of the catalogue Richard Anuszkiewicz: Paintings and Sculptures 1945-2001 (2010). He was named a distinguished alumnus of Ridgewood High School.

=== International Academic Competitions ===
Madden is the founder, owner, and executive director of International Academic Competitions (IAC). IAC's competitions include the for-profit National History Bee, National Geography Bee, National Science Bee, National History Bowl, National Geography Bowl, United States History Bee, United States Geography Bee, United States Geography Championships, National Biology Bee, National Humanities Bee, National Mathematics Bee, National Citizenship Bee, National Academic Bowl, National Academic Bee, National Political Science Bee, National Championship Exams, and other competitions. IAC also oversees four World Championship events: the International History Olympiad, the International Geography Championships, the International Environmental Science Olympiad, and the International Science Championships. Throughout the course and continued expansion of IAC, Madden has built a community of enthusiasts.

== Personal life ==
Madden and his wife, Nolwenn Léon, got married in 2012. Their first child, a daughter, was born in 2026.

== See also ==
- List of Jeopardy! contestants
- National History Bee and Bowl
