= Roger Craig (Jeopardy! contestant) =

American game show contestant

- Known for: Jeopardy!
- Spouse: Julia Collins

Roger Alan Craig Jr. is an American game show contestant. He held the record for highest single-day winnings on the quiz show Jeopardy! from September 14, 2010 (surpassing Ken Jennings) to April 9, 2019 (when James Holzhauer surpassed him). In 2011, Craig returned to win the Jeopardy! Tournament of Champions. In 2014, he competed in the Battle of the Decades tournament, finishing third overall behind Brad Rutter and Ken Jennings.

== Early life ==
Craig, who was 33 years old at the time of his initial Jeopardy! appearance in 2010, is a native of Ferndale, Pennsylvania. He grew up there and later in Virginia, where he graduated from Annandale High School in 1995.

Craig holds a first degree in biology and biochemistry from Virginia Tech, and a master's degree and Ph.D. in computer science from the University of Delaware. He was working on his doctorate at the time of his first appearance on Jeopardy!, and completed the degree later in 2010.

In his scholarly career, Craig has published eight papers in the field of bioinformatics, specifically on topics of combinatorial protein synthesis and protein-protein prediction.

== Career ==
=== Jeopardy! ===
==== Preparation ====
Craig prepared for Jeopardy! by studying the online archive of past questions maintained on the J! Archive website. Using data-mining and text-clustering, he identified the topics most likely to occur in game questions, then used the spaced repetition program Anki for memorization and tested himself using his own program.

Craig played quiz bowl as a student at both Virginia Tech and the University of Delaware. Before his Jeopardy! appearances, he played numerous Jeopardy scrimmage matches against his friends with quiz bowl experience.

Craig believes his attendance at the two universities helped the most in his success:

Let's face it, for Jeopardy!, the name of the game is breadth not depth. I think the main reason both universities helped so much is that they cover just about all spheres of learning in extraordinary depth.

==== Appearances ====
===== Original run =====
Craig set his record of $77,000 on the second day of the 2010–2011 Jeopardy! season on the episode airing September 14, 2010. In his record-setting appearance, he had a score of $47,000 after the game's first two rounds, then wagered and won $30,000 in the Final Jeopardy! round. Prior to Craig, the single-day record of $75,000 was held by Ken Jennings. Craig lost to North Carolina sportswriter Jelisa Castrodale in his seventh appearance. He had the lead going into the Final Jeopardy! round, in the category "Sports and the Media". Castrodale won when she gave the correct response to the Final Jeopardy question about the winner of Super Bowl XLIV, while Craig gave an incorrect response, finishing third behind Castrodale and police officer Matt Martin. The record, however, was short of the overall $3,900 set by Robert H. Smith, Jr., in 1973, which would be the equivalent of $78,000 in scoring since November 26, 2001.

In his seven-day run, Craig earned $231,200, all but $1,000 of which was from winning episodes.

On April 9, 2019, professional sports gambler James Holzhauer broke Craig's single-day record, surpassing it 15 more times during his own run; the record now stands at $131,127 as of April 17, 2019. Holzhauer, like Craig, relied on aggressive Daily Double and Final Jeopardy! wagers to amass his totals. Holzhauer also surpassed Craig's records for most earnings won in a player's first five games and the largest successful bet on a Daily Double.

===== Tournament play =====
In 2011, Craig returned for the Tournament of Champions, which aired in November. In the quarter-final match, he had $200 shy of $40,000 going into Final Jeopardy! and won despite losing $20,200 after getting Final Jeopardy! wrong. In the semi-final match, described as "a bloody, epic, inter-planetary death match... the Jeopardy! equivalent of a title-unification fight", Craig beat college physics professor Joon Pahk and student and waiter Mark Runsvold, the sixth and tenth regular-play all-time money winners on the show at the time. On the first night of the two-day finals, Craig became the first player in the history of the show to uncover two Daily Double items in succession, wager all of his money on both, and win both times.

When Craig hit the first of his back-to-back Daily Doubles, he wagered his entire pot of $9,000, and won when he correctly identified Anne Brontë as the author who wrote the 1847 book Agnes Grey under the pseudonym 'Acton Bell'. After switching categories and uncovering the second Daily Double, Craig wagered his entire pot of $18,000, winning when he correctly answered, "What is Suriname?" after being given the clue "Although Dutch is the official language, Sranan Tongo is spoken by most people in this South American country." At the time, his $18,000 win was the largest successful Daily Double wager in the show's history.

Craig won the Tournament of Champions. In the finals, he defeated systems engineer Buddy Wright and writer Tom Nissley (the latter being the show's fourth highest all-time non-tournament money winner), to win the grand prize of $250,000.

Craig returned for the Jeopardy! Battle of the Decades tournament on April 1, 2014, as part of the 2000s Week. Facing chemical engineer Vijay Balse (2010 Tournament of Champions winner) and history professor Stephanie Jass, he defeated Balse by $1 and advanced to the quarterfinals. Craig won in the quarterfinals on May 5, facing off against instructional designer and curriculum developer Robin Carroll (2000 Tournament of Champions winner) and "shovel bum" Leszek Pawlowicz (1992 Tournament of Champions winner). Craig then defeated then-world history teacher Colby Burnett (Fall 2012 Teachers Tournament and 2013 Tournament of Champions winner) and graduate student Pam Mueller (Fall 2000 College Championship winner) in the semifinals and advanced to the finals where he placed third. Craig was hurt in the finals by two "True Daily Double" wagers, one on each day of the two-day final, in which he risked $10,200 and responded incorrectly both times.

Craig later appeared in the 2019 All-Star Games with team captain Austin Rogers and 2013 Teen Tournament winner Leonard Cooper. His team went home with $75,000 after losing in the wild card match.

===== Records =====
During his Jeopardy! appearances, Craig set the following records:

Description	Set Record	Current record
Highest 5-game total on Jeopardy!, first 5 games (unadjusted)	$195,801	$298,687 (James Holzhauer)
Highest single-game total on Jeopardy!	$77,000 (September 14, 2010)	$131,127 (James Holzhauer, April 17, 2019)
Largest true daily double bet (unadjusted)	$18,000 (November 14, 2011)	$25,600 (James Holzhauer, May 17, 2023)
Largest daily double bet (unadjusted)	$18,000 (November 14, 2011)	$25,600 (James Holzhauer, May 17, 2023)

=== Other activities ===
Craig is the founder of Cotinga, a company which performs data analyses and creates learning applications for smartphones. On August 23, 2012, Craig was a guest on KFC Radio of Barstool Sports.

== Personal life ==
In 2025, Craig revealed that he is married to Julia Collins, a fellow Jeopardy! champion. The couple met 10 years prior to their marriage at a Jeopardy! community event in New York City and reconnected at the show's All-Star Games event.

In November 2011, Craig was living in Newark, Delaware, and working as a computer scientist. When the Battle of the Decades tournament aired in 2014, Craig was living in Brooklyn, New York, and working as a data scientist. As of 2025, Craig resides in Arlington, Virginia.
