= Frank Spangenberg =

American game show contestant (born 1957)

- Born: July 26, 1957 (age 69); New York City, U.S.
- Known for: Jeopardy! champion; former all-time five-day winnings record holder ($205,194 adjusted to 2001 scoring)

Lieutenant Frank Spangenberg (born July 26, 1957) is an American game show contestant who garnered fame in 1990 when he set the five-day cumulative winnings record on Jeopardy!, becoming the first person to win more than $100,000 in five days on the show. He has been called one of the "veritable legends" of the show.

== Career ==
Spangenberg, at the time a member of the New York City Transit Police Department (now the Transit Bureau of the New York City Police Department), won $102,597 in five days in 1990. On his fifth and final appearance, he set a one-day record of $30,600. Prior to 2003, winners were retired after five consecutive victories and due to a winnings cap in place on Jeopardy! at the time, Spangenberg was able to keep only $75,000 of his total winnings; he donated the remaining $27,597 to the Gift of Love Hospice, a facility operated by the Missionaries of Charity. According to Spangenberg, his donation arrived at the facility the day after the hospice learned it needed to install a safety system that totaled approximately the same amount as his excess winnings.

The five-day record remained a net record until 2019, because of rule changes in 2001 regarding the value of clues, and in 2003 eliminating the five-appearance limit. Contestants must win $205,194 in their first five days in order to break Spangenberg's record. Only one contestant (James Holzhauer, winning $298,687 in five days) has done so.

Shortly after he won his first five games in 1990, he appeared on Late Night with David Letterman and played the Jeopardy! home game on the show with Letterman. He would also later appear on its successor program, The Late Show, as a member of the New York City Transit Department choir.

Spangenberg also won Jeopardy!'s Tenth Anniversary Tournament in 1993, winning $41,800, and earlier won $5,000 as a semifinalist in the 1990 version of the annual Tournament of Champions, won $5,000 as a quarterfinalist on the 1990 Super Jeopardy!, then later won $10,000 as a quarterfinalist on the 2002 Jeopardy! Million Dollar Masters, then $105,199 on the 2005 Jeopardy! Ultimate Tournament of Champions, and finally (as of 2019) $5,000 as a first-round participant in 2014's Jeopardy! Battle of the Decades tournament, bringing his lifetime Jeopardy!-related winnings (regular game and tournaments) to $274,596.

In 2007, Spangenberg was one of 16 former game show contestants invited to participate in GSN's Grand Slam tournament. Seeded 12th, Spangenberg was matched up with former United States Navy officer David Legler, who had won a then-record setting $1.765 million on Twenty One in 2000. Spangenberg won only one of the three rounds against Legler and lost after his allotted time ran out.

=== City Council candidacy ===
Spangenberg was a candidate for the 19th district of the New York City Council in 2021. He was in the Democratic Party primary to replace term-limited Paul Vallone that occurred on June 22, 2021.
