= Broadcast of Jeopardy! =

American television game show

Jeopardy! is an American television game show created by Merv Griffin, in which contestants are presented with clues in the form of answers and must phrase their responses in the form of a question. The show has experienced a long life in several incarnations over the course of over a half-century, spending more than 12 years as a daytime network program and having currently run in syndication for 43 seasons. It has also gained a worldwide following with a multitude of international adaptations.

== Overview ==
=== Main series ===
Series	Seasons	Episodes	Originally released		
Series	Seasons	Episodes	First released	Last released	Network
Jeopardy! (original)	12	2,753	March 30, 1964	January 3, 1975	NBC
Jeopardy! (weekly syndication)	2	39	September 1974	1975	Broadcast syndication
The All-New Jeopardy!	1	108	October 2, 1978	March 2, 1979	NBC
Jeopardy! (daily syndication)	43	TBA	September 10, 1984	present	Broadcast syndication

=== Spin-offs ===
{{Series overview

Series	Seasons	Episodes	Originally released		
Series	Seasons	Episodes	First released	Last released	Network
Super Jeopardy!	1	13	June 16, 1990	September 8, 1990	ABC
Jep!	1	22	January 30, 1998	June 1998	Game Show Network
Rock & Roll Jeopardy!	4	100	August 8, 1998	December 2001	VH1
Sports Jeopardy!	3	116	September 24, 2014	December 7, 2016	Crackle, NBCSN
Jeopardy! The Greatest of All Time	1	4	January 7, 2020	January 14, 2020	ABC
Jeopardy! National College Championship	1	9	February 8, 2022	February 22, 2022	ABC
Celebrity Jeopardy!	4	49	September 25, 2022	present	ABC
Jeopardy! Masters	4	37	May 8, 2023	present	ABC
Pop Culture Jeopardy!	2	60	December 4, 2024	present	Amazon Prime Video, Netflix
ESPN Jeopardy!	1	10	July 31, 2026	present	Disney+, Hulu, ESPN

== 1964–1975 ==
=== Original series (1964–1975) ===
The original Jeopardy! series, hosted by Art Fleming, premiered at 11:30 a.m. Eastern (10:30 Central) on March 30, 1964, replacing the game show Missing Links, and originating from studios at the NBC headquarters in New York City's 30 Rockefeller Plaza. NBC moved the program to 12:00 noon Eastern (11:00 a.m. Central) after eighteen months, replacing Call My Bluff, making it accessible to businessmen coming home for their lunch break or else watching it on restaurant or bar sets, and college students departing their classes for the day watching it on student center or dormitory sets. These two constituencies, who ordinarily did not have the time or interest to view other daytime programs, made the show a runaway hit, propelling its ratings to second place among all daytime game shows by the end of the decade—second only to its immediate lead-in, The Hollywood Squares. The show had practically no trouble whatsoever against soap operas such as Love of Life and Where the Heart Is on CBS and mostly sitcom reruns on ABC.

In 1973, Lin Bolen, then Vice President of Daytime Programming at NBC, began eliminating longer-running game shows from the network in an aggressive attempt to bolster ratings among women aged 18 to 34, a desirable demographic to advertisers on daytime programs of that day; Jeopardy! had not performed especially strongly among those viewers, despite its overwhelming success among men and young people. Refreshing the daytime lineup became especially imperative to Bolen when CBS launched a surprise success in the soap opera The Young and the Restless at 12:00 p.m. EST (11:00 a.m. CST) in March 1973, drawing away younger audiences in particular. Although Jeopardy! continued to produce high ratings in the 12:00 noon time slot (also against the ABC revival of Password), Bolen moved the game to 10:30 a.m. Eastern (9:30 Central) on January 7, 1974, putting it up against CBS' The $10,000 Pyramid, to make room for Jackpot!, a stylish, youth-oriented riddle contest hosted by Geoff Edwards, in Jeopardy!'s former timeslot. Bolen and other NBC executives were surprised, though, when Jeopardy! actually beat Pyramid for several weeks in February and March, prompting CBS to cancel Pyramid for failing to draw, according to packager Bob Stewart (who also produced Jackpot!), a 30 share that CBS daytime executives required a show to have in order to stay on its daytime schedule (Pyramid returned several weeks later on ABC in an afternoon slot and went on to become one of the most popular games of the 1970s and 1980s). CBS relocated Gambit to 10:30 a.m. on April 1, which ran about even with Jeopardy! in the ratings, with Gambit having perhaps a slight lead, due to its more traditional housewife target audience. Remarkably, Jeopardy! stayed strong despite losing much of its core audience, who was usually either at work or in classrooms during that hour and thus could not watch the show then.

However, Bolen was not interested in seeing an aging show like Jeopardy! stand in the way of her plans for a more youthful image for NBC's daytime lineup, so she resolved to prepare it for eventual cancellation, a rare instance of a network deliberately trying to undermine one of its programs. So, on July 1 of the same year, NBC moved Jeopardy! to yet another timeslot, this time to 1:30 p.m. EST (12:30 p.m. CST) (replacing Three on a Match, yet another Bob Stewart-produced game) and placed it against ABC's Let's Make a Deal and CBS' As the World Turns, both of which had easily beaten the ratings of several programs placed in that same time slot by NBC since December 1968. At that time, Deal moved to ABC from NBC, which had carried it in that very time slot during much of the 1960s, in a dispute by packagers Stefan Hatos and Monty Hall over the latter network's refusal to make a weekly primetime version of the show permanent.

With the July move, many of the previously tenaciously devoted viewers began abandoning the program; most of the remaining ones were either middle-aged housewives or elderly retirees, two groups undesirable to advertisers due to their usually fixed retail brand preferences, rendering them unpersuadable to try new ones. As such, advertising revenues fell, a scenario not helped by the severe economic recession occurring in late 1974. Jeopardy! became the seventh show since 1968 to fall at 1:30 p.m. EST (12:30 p.m. CST), and a cancellation notice was issued in November 1974. Its replacement was the expansion of Another World to a full hour, the first daytime serial to expand to that duration, in a schedule switch with How to Survive a Marriage. In April 1975, another serial, Days of Our Lives began occupying that time slot and eventually brought success to NBC there (Days moved exclusively to the network streaming service Peacock in September 2022, with NBC News Daily airing in its 1:30 p.m. EST (12:30 p.m. CST) timeslot.). Jeopardy! broadcast the 2,753rd and final episode of its original network run on January 3, 1975. Some affiliates, including KNBC in Los Angeles, aired reruns in various other timeslots through the first quarter of that year. To compensate Griffin for canceling the program, which still had a year left on its contract, NBC purchased Wheel of Fortune, another creation of his, which premiered on January 6, 1975 (the following Monday) at 10:30 a.m. Eastern (9:30 Central).

=== Weekly syndicated version (1974–1975) ===
Griffin secured the rights from NBC to produce new episodes for first-run syndication, with Metromedia (who also syndicated Griffin's talk show) as their distributor. Griffin took this action mainly to keep the show in production in light of the show's deteriorating ratings on NBC daytime that eventually led to the 1975 cancellation. NBC had repeatedly refused Griffin's requests to do so in the past. These episodes began airing weekly in September 1974 and featured many contestants who were previous champions on the NBC version. Thirty-nine episodes were produced, with reruns of this version also airing in syndication through about summer 1975. Most stations aired this during the Prime Time Access slots in the early evening before network primetime programming began, usually in a "checkerboard" pattern with other weekly shows, meaning a different syndicated show aired each night, like the networks in prime time. By 1974, though, the market was flooded with evening versions of network games like the Hollywood Squares and The Price Is Right, and Jeopardy!, already on a popularity downswing for some time, did not get anywhere near nationwide clearance, thus dooming it to failure after one season.

Unique to this version was a bonus awarded at the end of the program, after Final Jeopardy! was completed. The episode's champion selected a prize hidden behind the thirty squares on the Jeopardy! board. Among the prizes was a $25,000 cash award which was hidden behind two squares. In order to win the top prize, the champion had to find both $25,000 cards in succession (winning the prize on a second pick if it was not the latter half of the grand prize). In later episodes, the bonus board was dropped and the evening's champion received a prize based upon his or her final score, with a Chevrolet Vega or Chevrolet Caprice (or even additional cash prizes of $10,000 or $25,000) as possibilities.

=== The All-New Jeopardy! (1978–1979) ===
Launching on October 2, 1978, the revived Jeopardy! took the spot of the soap opera For Richer, For Poorer on NBC's daytime schedule, in a schedule switch with The Hollywood Squares. It initially aired weekdays at 10:30 a.m. From its debut until January 5, 1979, Jeopardy! aired against the first half-hour of The Price Is Right on CBS. As such, the show found itself unable to build an audience.

On January 8, 1979, NBC moved Jeopardy! from 10:30 a.m. to noon, taking over the first half hour of the talk/variety program America Alive! Although the original series had occupied that time slot during much of its run, the television climate in 1979 was much different than it was in the 1960s and early 1970s. The 12:00 p.m. slot was one that network affiliates often chose to preempt in favor of showing other programming such as a midday local newscast or a syndicated offering such as another game show or a talk show. In markets that did air Jeopardy! at noon, the show found itself losing the ratings battle against The $20,000 Pyramid on ABC and The Young and the Restless on CBS, two shows that, ironically enough, had competed against the original in 1974 and 1973, respectively. NBC decided to pull the plug on the revived Jeopardy! series shortly after the move, and its 108th and final episode aired on March 2, 1979. Its place on the schedule was taken by Password Plus, which at the time had been airing at 12:30 p.m., and the cancellation allowed NBC to expand its top-rated soap opera, Another World, to ninety minutes from sixty, later in the afternoon.

Originating from the NBC Studios in Burbank, California, this version featured some unique gameplay elements of its own. Among the most notable of these changes is that the lowest scoring contestant was eliminated from further play after the Jeopardy! round. The remaining two contestants then played the Double Jeopardy! round.

In a second major change, no Final Jeopardy! round was played. Instead, the leader at the end of Double Jeopardy! was declared the day's champion, and the champion then played a bonus round called Super Jeopardy! for a cash bonus. The round consisted of five categories (instead of six as in the main game), each with five clues numbered 1 to 5. The object of the round was to select and correctly respond to five clues that formed a horizontal, vertical, or diagonal line on the board before accumulating three strikes, given if the contestant failed to correctly respond to a chosen clue (whether by giving an incorrect response, running out of time, or passing). If the contestant struck out, $100 was awarded for each correct answer given, but if the contestant was successful, they would win a cash bonus based on how many days they had been champion. In a contestant's first time playing the Super Jeopardy! round, the top prize was $5,000, and for each successive time a champion played the Super Jeopardy! round (regardless of whether or not the contestant had won the round the day before), the prize would increase by $2,500—so a second trip was played for $7,500, a third $10,000, a fourth $12,500, and a fifth and final trip $15,000. A contestant could earn $50,000 from Super Jeopardy! alone, provided that the contestant won each Super Jeopardy! round over a five-day reign as champion.

Another change in format was present only in the pilot episode, taped for CBS over a year before the show premiered. The game opened with each contestant in order (chosen by backstage coin toss) playing an individual 30-second lightning round on the Jeopardy! round board; a correct response would credit the player with the value of the clue while an incorrect response or a pass would have no penalty and the clue would remain on the board where it could later be selected again (either by another player in their lightning round, or by any player in the more traditional second half of the Jeopardy! round). When all three lightning rounds were complete, there was a commercial break, and then play would resume as normal with the remainder of the Jeopardy! round board (the clues that had not yet been correctly responded to), with the player in third place selecting first.

The pilot episode also featured a 90-second time limit for the Super Jeopardy! round, with a timer shown on screen; the final broadcast version of the show did not have a visible timer for the round as a whole, though a player could still time out on individual clues as in the regular game.

Fleming later stated that he disagreed with moving the show to southern California, as he considered the contestants there to not be as appealing as those who played the game in New York were. He cited it as one of the main reasons he did not return to the series when it was revived five years later.

== Daily Syndication (1984–present) ==
Following the success of the nighttime syndicated version of Wheel which had premiered in 1983, Griffin sold a new syndicated version of Jeopardy! to its same distributor, King World Productions (which much later folded into CBS Television Distribution, now CBS Media Ventures). This version introduced updated technology to the program, replacing the former manually operated game board featuring clues printed on pull cards with television monitors to display clues. One significant difference from the 1964 to 1975 versions was that only the winning contestant kept his or her earnings, while the runners-up were awarded higher-end consolation prizes instead (changed in later years to $3,000 for second place and $2,000 for third). After Fleming declined to return to the show because of his dissatisfaction with the changes, Griffin took the advice of Lucille Ball, who recommended Alex Trebek (who was friends with former host Fleming) for the position. Trebek, in turn, recommended Johnny Gilbert, whom he had met at a dinner party a few years prior, for the announcer position.

The Trebek version debuted September 10, 1984. Trebek continued to host the program until his death in November 2020, with his final recorded episode airing January 8, 2021; a series of guest hosts helmed the series for the remainder of that season. Mike Richards, the show's executive producer, was named host prior to start of the 2021–22 season but resigned after the first week of episodes when a string of controversies emerged after Richards's hiring; Mayim Bialik and Ken Jennings (the latter being a consulting producer and prominent former contestant) rotated as host from then until Bialik went on strike in summer 2023 and was dismissed from her role in December of that year, leaving Jennings the permanent host.

=== Early years ===
Initially, Jeopardy! was relegated by managers of some television stations to unpopular time slots, and it was not unusual for both Jeopardy! and Wheel to air either non-consecutively, on different stations, or even against each other. However, the new version built upon early ratings successes in Cleveland and Detroit, where it was slotted in the same 7:00–8:00 p.m. block (the Prime Time access hour) in which Wheel also appeared. Coinciding with the peak of popularity for the board game Trivial Pursuit and the installation of electronic trivia games (e.g. NTN Buzztime) in pubs and bars, Jeopardy! was slowly becoming a major success despite some markets still airing it in unfavorable time slots. One such market was New York City, the largest in the United States. There, King World sold its new show to WNBC, which had been the flagship of the original Jeopardy!. When it premiered in the fall of 1984, Jeopardy! initially aired at 1:30 a.m. on WNBC, following Late Night with David Letterman.

Although the series was indeed proving to be a hit, its late timeslot in the country's largest media market began to concern its distributor. Even though Letterman's show and The Tonight Show Starring Johnny Carson were strong ratings winners and Jeopardy! was able to retain a good amount of the audience from its lead-in shows, a late-night timeslot is not usually considered beneficial for a first-run series, cutting out younger audiences with obligations to school or college, and older viewers. WNBC's more favorable fringe time and daytime slots were all filled with other programming, a situation that was also true at all of the other major stations in the city; WABC and WCBS also cleared their networks' schedules completely and had other programming, including other long-running syndicated game shows and reruns, filing the holes in their schedules, as did independents WNEW-TV, WOR-TV and WPIX, which also carried cartoons in addition to reruns. In addition, CBS and ABC at the time were still airing network programming until 4:30 p.m. Eastern, with ABC airing the long-running soap opera The Edge of Night and CBS running the game show Body Language.

On October 26, 1984, several weeks into Jeopardy!’s first season, Procter & Gamble Productions announced that it would cease production of The Edge of Night after 28 years and that ABC would no longer offer regular programming in the timeslot, with Edge's last episode airing December 28. King World went to WABC, who now had an open spot on its schedule it needed to fill, and the two struck an agreement to move Jeopardy! to the station beginning December 31, 1984. WABC has aired Jeopardy! in the New York market ever since, initially in the 4:00 p.m. time slot. The switch helped more viewers find Jeopardy!, since they no longer had to stay up past midnight to see it.

In Los Angeles, KCBS-TV aired a 90 minute game show lineup (branded as "the L.A. Games") which included a syndicated revival of Let's Make a Deal (with returning host Monty Hall), a new comedy game show Anything for Money (hosted by Fred Travalena) and Jeopardy! as a lead-in to its 4:30 p.m. edition of Channel 2 News. Five weeks later, however, due to low ratings, KCBS replaced Jeopardy! with reruns of Quincy, M.E.. Jeopardy! did not air in Los Angeles until January 7, 1985, when it was picked up by then-independent station KCOP-TV, where it was paired with Wheel of Fortune.

=== Prime Time Access shakeup ===
WABC added Oprah to its lineup in the fall of 1986, and placed it at 10:00 a.m., following its locally produced talk show The Morning Show. Having its roots in a local morning show at WABC's sister station in Chicago, Oprah was an immediate success and in December 1986, WABC decided to move it to the 4:00 p.m. timeslot. The move, which turned out to be permanent as Oprah remained at 4:00 p.m. for the next 24-plus years, displaced the game shows airing there; Jeopardy! at 4:00 p.m. and a syndicated edition of Card Sharks, hosted by Bill Rafferty at 4:30. Like previous shows that aired in the 4:30 p.m. slot following Jeopardy!, Card Sharks proved unable to retain a good percentage of its lead-in's audience, and WABC moved it to 12:05 a.m. following Nightline. Moving Jeopardy! to a similar slot was not an option due to its success in the ratings, and all other non-network slots were spoken for. WABC, however, had another idea.

At the time, and like its major competitors, WABC aired an hour of local news at 6:00 p.m. and followed it with their network's national newscast, in this case World News Tonight, at 7:00 p.m.. The 7:30 p.m. slot was filled by a syndicated revival of Hollywood Squares, hosted by John Davidson which debuted in the fall of 1986, and was performing well for WABC against the immensely popular Wheel of Fortune on WCBS. Seeing those ratings, WABC thought it could draw equal or better ratings with Jeopardy! in the 7:00 p.m slot. ABC did not require its stations to air World News Tonight at a specific time, giving WABC the freedom to make the move if it wanted.

On December 15, 1986, the same day Oprah moved to 4:00 p.m., WABC reduced the 6:00 p.m. broadcast of Eyewitness News by 30 minutes and moved World News Tonight to 6:30, with Jeopardy! airing at 7:00 and Squares following it at 7:30. To alert viewers to the timeslot changes, WABC launched an advertising campaign entitled "Prime Time Begins At 7 On 7". In addition, WABC filled part of Oprah's vacated 10:00 a.m. slot with a repeat of the previous evening's broadcast of Jeopardy! until September 1987. The move produced a ratings win in both the 6:30 and 7:00 p.m. time slots, as World News Tonight also benefited from the switch; this, along with the rise of WABC's Eyewitness News in the New York ratings books, paved the way for WABC to become the most-watched television station in the New York market.

Eventually, WCBS and WNBC capitulated, and their networks' respective national newscasts moved to 6:30 p.m. as well. After moving the CBS Evening News to 6:30 p.m. in the fall of 1988, WCBS picked up a syndicated edition of the NBC game show Win, Lose or Draw to air at 7:00 p.m. as a lead-in for Wheel, while WNBC, (which eventually moved NBC Nightly News to 6:30 in 1991), eventually began airing newsmagazines (such as Inside Edition) and a new syndicated version of Family Feud, hosted by Ray Combs, (who also hosted the show's daytime revival on CBS) in the half-hour prior to prime time.

WABC has aired Jeopardy! at 7:00 ever since, though the same lead-out issues plagued the station. Squares's ratings declined in the 1987-88 season and Entertainment Tonight, which had been airing the previous two seasons on WWOR-TV, (the former WOR-TV that had been sold the previous year in the midst of an unrelated ownership dispute), replaced Squares as the Jeopardy! lead-out in the fall of 1988; Squares would air on WPIX for the 1988-89 season, which turned out to be its last. In 1990, Entertainment Tonight and Wheel of Fortune swapped stations, as WCBS had opted to air newsmagazine and entertainment programming in the early fringe timeslot; Jeopardy! and Wheel have remained on WABC ever since. WCBS' Los Angeles sister station KCBS-TV reacquired Jeopardy (along with Wheel) on September 4, 1989.

WABC's successful access hour move eventually resulted in many Eastern and Pacific Time Zone network affiliates moving their network newscasts to 6:30 p.m. While affiliates in the Central and Mountain time zones generally program Wheel at 6:30 p.m., however, Jeopardy! largely airs in late afternoon (and in some cases, morning) timeslots, as these stations typically air local newscasts in the half-hour following their networks' respective national ones.

Jeopardy! has since become a staple syndicated show for ABC's owned-and-operated station group, and seven of its eight stations (WABC, KABC/Los Angeles, WLS/Chicago, WPVI/Philadelphia, KGO/San Francisco, WTVD/Raleigh-Durham and KFSN/Fresno) have carried the show along with Wheel since 1992. In that year, KGO and KABC respectively acquired Jeopardy (along with Wheel) from then-NBC affiliate KRON-TV in March and KCBS-TV in September. The only exception has long been KTRK in Houston, which had never carried both game shows in part due to an hour-long newscast in the Prime Time Access hour where Wheel is normally seen (and whose hour-long newscast predated parent company Capital Cities' acquisition of ABC in 1986); both game shows have aired on different Houston stations: first on NBC affiliate KPRC from their respective start dates until 1986, and then to CBS affiliate KHOU which also carried The Oprah Winfrey Show over its entire run (making KTRK the only ABC owned-and-operated station that never carried Oprah over its 25-year run). However, on September 14, 2015, KTRK began airing Jeopardy!, making it the last ABC-owned station to do so, though Wheel of Fortune continues to air on KHOU, as KTRK still carries an hour-long block of local newscasts (both separate half-hour newscasts, for ratings purposes) in the 6:00 p.m. access hour.

=== Transition to high definition ===
On September 11, 2006, with the start of Season 23, Jeopardy! began broadcasting in high definition. King World and production company Sony Pictures Television indicated that as of August 10, 2006, some 49 of the 210 stations that carried the show at that time were prepared for the transition. Sony uses the 1080i HD format to record the show, but since Jeopardy! is syndicated, stations using the 720p format had to manually transcode the show from an HD satellite feed before broadcasting it. This issue was remedied with the introduction of the Pathfire satellite system for high-definition syndicated content distribution.

=== Ratings and critical reception ===
Since its debut, the syndicated version of Jeopardy! has gone on to win sixteen Daytime Emmy Awards for Outstanding Game/Audience Participation Show, achieving this honor most recently in 2017, and today it holds the record as the most honored program in this Emmy award category.

The show was the subject of great interest and increased ratings (often out-performing Wheel and even some primetime programs) in the early portions of the 2004–05 season as contestant Ken Jennings, taking advantage of newly relaxed appearance rules, won 74 matches before being defeated by Nancy Zerg in his 75th appearance. He amassed $2,520,700 over the course of his winning streak, as well as a $2,000 second-place prize in his 75th appearance, thus earning the record as the highest money-winner ever on American game shows, and his winning streak led the show to become TV's highest-rated syndicated program.

=== Renewals and rerun deals ===
On January 2, 2007, one third of the subscribing stations originally renewed Jeopardy! through Season 28 (2011–12), but by April 8, 2010, Jeopardy! was given an additional two-year renewal through Season 30 (2013–14). Then in 2012, Trebek and Wheel personalities Pat Sajak and Vanna White renewed their respective contracts when the shows' ABC-owned affiliates renewed both game shows through the 2015–16 season.

In November 2018, the ABC-owned-and-operated stations renewed their agreement to carry Wheel and Jeopardy! through 2023, rebuffing a larger contract offer from Fox Corporation. CBS has long viewed stability as key to the shows' success, desiring to keep the shows on ABC stations to maintain continuity; it has declined to move the shows to its own owned-and-operated station group for the same reason it rejected Fox's bid.

Since the mid-2010s, CBS Media Ventures has offered stations up to two episodes of Jeopardy! to air each weekday: the first run (which airs new episodes from September to July), and a "classic Jeopardy!" package consisting of episodes from the previous year.

As of December 2023, every TV market in the U.S., except for Glendive, Montana, has a local TV station that airs the program: NBC affiliates constitute a plurality of the stations, while ABC affiliates reach the most viewers. Some local TV stations which carry Jeopardy! also hold in-market on-demand streaming rights to the five most recent episodes, subject to technical capability. For example, Sinclair Broadcast Group's Stirr service began to carry the program in the markets where Sinclair stations air the program, such as Washington, D.C. (WJLA) and Seattle (KOMO), from late 2020 until Sinclair sold Stirr off to another company. Under the terms of the agreement, individual stations have a 24-hour window in which they can stream the program in-market, after which the rights revert to Sony.

Outside of the U.S., Jeopardy! airs on the American Forces Network, and Canadian stations Yes TV, CHEK and NTV. Australian TV network SBS Viceland airs former episodes with Trebek still as host, but in 2024 they will air episodes with Ken Jennings as host.

Archival episode rights were most recently held by Pluto TV, which like CBS Media Ventures is owned by Paramount. Pluto launched a continuous linear channel of episodes from the Trebek era in August 2022. The Pluto deal covers 500 episodes of the series spanning most of Trebek's hosting run, with an emphasis on major tournaments. The Pluto deal with Jeopardy! expired after two years, at the end of July 2024, ahead of a new streaming agreement yet to be announced. Select episodes of Jeopardy! had been available intermittently on Netflix until August 2021; the agreement with Pluto allows Sony to continue selling episodes of the series to subscription video-on-demand (SVOD) providers. In 2024, host Ken Jennings indicated that Sony was in negotiations with Hulu (which, like ABC, is owned by The Walt Disney Company) and Amazon Prime Video (the home of an upcoming spinoff Pop Culture Jeopardy!) to bring next-day streaming to an SVOD platform by September 2025; executive producer Michael Davies also noted that the show had no plans of ever leaving broadcast television.

In June 2025, Sony announced that the show would stream new episodes next day, as well as a selection of archival episodes, on both Hulu and Peacock in the United States beginning with the shows 42nd season in September 2025. In August 2025, Sony announced a similar streaming deal with Bell Media to stream new and archival episodes on Crave in Canada. The deal included five most recent episodes, with each episode being available the day after the broadcast, and select classic episodes, which were always available.

=== Paramount-Sony dispute ===
In October 2024, Sony Pictures Television sued CBS parent company Paramount Global, alleging the company had entered into unauthorized licensing deals in Australia and New Zealand while pocketing all of the revenue. Sony also alleged that CBS engaged in self-dealing and underpriced the syndication package by forcing television stations to accept other, less popular shows from CBS's own production companies, also alleging that keeping the stations on ABC-owned stations while CBS's own stations aired Entertainment Tonight was further evidence of Sony being cheated. In a counterresponse, Paramount claimed that the original agreement with King World "decades ago" granted the syndicator distribution rights "in perpetuity" meaning that Sony could not seek other syndicators, and surmised that it was suing because "they simply don't like" it. Paramount countersued Sony to that effect in November.

Sony Pictures Television announced on February 3, 2025, that that week's episodes of Jeopardy! and Wheel of Fortune would be the last ones it would feed to CBS Media Ventures and that it would begin distributing episodes of those shows directly to affiliates beginning with the week of February 10. CBS sought and received a restraining order blocking Sony from doing so on February 6. However, on April 10, it was reported that the court had ruled in favor of Sony, thus resulting in CBS losing the distribution rights. CBS then confirmed they would submit an appeal immediately, which would get accepted on April 16 thus giving them the distribution rights back.

In November 2025, it was announced that an agreement was made that would allow CBS to continue distribution of the show through the 2027–28 season, with Sony taking over afterwards. However, the marketing, promotions, and affiliate relations will move to Sony beginning in the 2026–27 season, while ad-sales will stay at CBS through the 2029–30 season.

== Spin-off programs ==
=== Jep! ===
Jep!, a children's version of the show, aired first on Game Show Network (now known by its abbreviated name, "GSN") throughout the 1998–99 season, and then on Discovery Kids through late 2004. It was hosted by cartoon voice actor Bob Bergen, and produced by Scott Sternberg who had earlier produced a children's version of Wheel, titled Wheel 2000. Contestants on Jep! were young children aged 10 through 12, who competed for merchandise packages instead of monetary prizes, with clue values in points rather than dollars.

=== Rock & Roll Jeopardy! ===
Rock & Roll Jeopardy!, a music-intensive version, debuted on VH1 on October 8, 1998 and ran for four seasons, ending on May 12, 2001. Hosted by Survivor star Jeff Probst, this version highlighted post-1950s popular music trivia rather than focusing on general knowledge. Announcers included Loretta Fox in seasons one and two, and Stew Herrera in seasons three and four.

=== Sports Jeopardy! ===
In fall 2014, Crackle, an online video portal owned by Sony, began exclusively carrying Sports Jeopardy!, a themed version of the show with material focused entirely on sports trivia. Sportscaster Dan Patrick hosts the series, which produces new episodes once a week. Kelly Miyahara, a member of the Jeopardy! Clue Crew, serves as an on-camera announcer. Howie Schwab serves as off-camera judge and consultant. The series was picked up by NBCSN for the 2016 season.

Each category has only four clues (250, 500, 750, and 1,000 in the Jeopardy! round, with those values doubled for Double Jeopardy!) compared to five in the parent series. The fewer clues allows Patrick and the contestants more time to interact during the interview portion of the show and during a "postgame" segment during and after the closing credits.

=== Pop Culture Jeopardy! ===
A pop-culture-focused version of the show premiered on Amazon Prime Video in December 2024, hosted by Colin Jost. A second season is scheduled to premiere in 2026, moving from Amazon Prime Video to Netflix. Each game is played with three teams of players (three players per team in the first season; two players per team in the second season); when a player buzzes in, that player must be the one to give the response, though team members are allowed to confer with each other on Daily Doubles. The game features the same amount of clues and same point values as the main show, but in addition to the Daily Doubles, each round features a Triple Play clue that has three correct responses. If a player buzzes in and gives one of the correct responses to the clue, their team is credited with the face value of the clue, and then the next team member in line must give a response (if all three correct responses have not yet been given); if the second player cannot give another correct response, or if a team member responds out of turn, then the value of the clue is deducted, the team loses their turn, and the remaining team or teams may buzz in; this continues until all three correct responses are provided, all three teams give an incorrect response, or time expires.

In the first season, the format is a single-elimination tournament starting with 81 teams, with an octofinal round (referred to as the "knockout round"), quarterfinals, semifinals, and a single final game, with a top prize of $300,000. In the second season, the format is changed to feature 15 "regular season" episodes where the winning team of each episode continues to the next episode (up to a 5-win limit), followed by a 5-episode tournament where the 9 teams with the longest winning streaks return to compete against each other to determine the ultimate winner.

Like previous spin-off programs, players are allowed to appear on both Pop Culture Jeopardy! and the main syndicated show.
