= ESPN Jeopardy! =

American television quiz show

- Genre: Game show
- Based on: Jeopardy! by Merv Griffin
- Presented by: Joe Buck
- Narrated by: Johnny Gilbert
- Theme music composer: Stewart Mitchell (Bleeding Fingers Music); Chris Bell Music & Sound Design (Note: Original theme composed by Merv Griffin)
- Country of origin: United States
- Original language: English
- No. of seasons: 1
- No. of episodes: 10

Production
- Executive producer: Michael Davies
- Production company: Sony Pictures (Note: As Sony Pictures Television in season 1)

Original release
- Network: Disney+ Hulu; ESPN
- Release: July 31, 2026 – present

Related
- Jeopardy!

ESPN Jeopardy! is an American television game show adapted from the quiz show Jeopardy! The show is centered around sports trivia, and features sports personalities, primarily those associated with ESPN, as contestants playing for charity. Sportscaster Joe Buck hosts the show.

== Conception and development ==
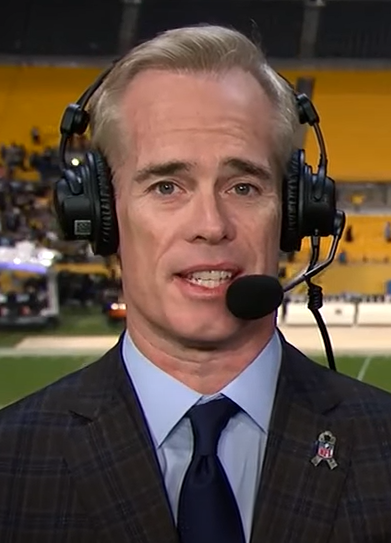
Joe Buck serves as the host of the show.

In April 2026, it was reported that The Walt Disney Company had ordered a new sports-themed spin-off of the game show Jeopardy! to air on the streaming services Disney+ and Hulu, as well as ESPN's streaming service. Joe Buck, who currently serves as the lead NFL play-by-play announcer for ESPN, agreed to a deal to serve as the host for ESPN Jeopardy!. Buck served as the final week (August 2021) guest host for the civilian Jeopardy! in 2021 following longtime host Alex Trebek's death, with Matt Amodio winning all five games he hosted.

This is the second sports-themed spinoff of Jeopardy!, after Sports Jeopardy! which was produced from 2014 to 2016. Unlike that version, which had civilian contestants, only existing sports personalities, mostly from ESPN, will take part in ESPN Jeopardy!

During a podcast interview with Tim Kurkjian, Buck indicated that the show would follow the one-hour Celebrity Jeopardy! format, including the Triple Jeopardy! round, albeit with points used as scoring.

In September 2026, the show was renewed for a second season, this time with civilian contestants.

== Contestants ==
=== Season 1 (July 31, 2026) ===
- Christine Williamson (Hillsborough Education Foundation)
- Jeremy Schaap (International Sports and Music Project)
- Kimberley A. Martin (YAI: Seeing Beyond Disability)
- MJ Acosta-Ruiz (Health in the Hood)
- Peter Schrager (Baby Quest Foundation)
- Omar Raja (Humanity First USA)
- Jon Hamm (St. Jude Children's Research Hospital)
- Keegan-Michael Key (Motion Picture & Television Fund)
- Adam Pally (National Alliance on Mental Illness)
- Hannah Storm (Hannah Storm Foundation)
- Jay Harris (Boys & Girls Clubs of America)
- Amina Smith (The Dinner Table Doc)
- Kyle Brandt (Pancreatic Cancer Action Network)
- Jamie Erdahl (American Heart Association)
- Manti Te'o (Lāhui Foundation)
- Kevin Negandhi (Connecticut Children's Foundation)
- Domonique Foxworth (Baltimore Educational Scholarship Trust Inc.)
- Madelyn Burke (Room to Grow)

== Episodes ==
=== Season 1 (July 31, 2026) ===
The six quarterfinal winners advanced to semifinals, as well as three Wild Cards. Wild Cards were determined by the three contestants with the highest number of correct answers during the game.

Quarterfinal losers receive $30,000 for their charities. Semifinal losers receive $50,000 for their charities. Champion receives $500,000 for his charity; the two runners-up receive $100,000 for their charities. Any ties will be resolved by a sudden-death category imposed on tied players, with first player buzzing in correctly wins it; if wrong, others can ring in to try to win it; if all tied players get it wrong the process is repeated until someone wins it.

Quarterfinals
Episode 1
Christine Williamson	0
Jeremy Schaap	20,900
Kimberley A. Martin	8,100
Episode 4
Hannah Storm	0 (Note: Storm finished the "Triple Jeopardy!" round with -5,700 points.)
Jay Harris	5,000
Amina Smith	700
Episode 6
Kevin Negandhi	10,000
Domonique Foxworth	1,100
Madelyn Burke	500
Episode 3
Jon Hamm	21,200
Keegan-Michael Key	16,000
Adam Pally	0 (Note: Pally finished the "Triple Jeopardy!" round with -900 points.)
Episode 2
MJ Acosta-Ruiz	1,199
Peter Schrager	25,100
Omar Raja	1
Episode 5
Kyle Brandt	5,799
Jamie Erdahl	0 (Note: Erdahl finished the "Triple Jeopardy!" round with 0 points.)
Manti Te'o	0

Semifinals
Episode 7
Jeremy Schaap	25,600
Jay Harris	8,200
Kevin Negandhi	14,600
Episode 8
Jon Hamm	23,601
Peter Schrager	23,600
Madelyn Burke (WC)	0 (Note: Burke finished the "Triple Jeopardy!" round with -500 points.)
Episode 9
Kyle Brandt	20,026
Domonique Foxworth (WC)	6,300
Keegan-Michael Key (WC)	2,199

Final
Episode 10
Jeremy Schaap	24,000
Jon Hamm	0
Kyle Brandt	5

== See also ==
- Sports Jeopardy!
