= Jep! =

- Genre: Game show
- Created by: Scott Sternberg
- Based on: Jeopardy! by Merv Griffin
- Directed by: Kevin McCarthy
- Presented by: Bob Bergen
- Theme music composer: Steve Kaplan
- Country of origin: United States
- Original language: English
- No. of seasons: 1
- No. of episodes: 22

Production
- Executive producers: Scott Sternberg; Harry Friedman
- Producer: Pamela Covais
- Production locations: Sony Pictures Studios, Culver City, California
- Running time: approx. 22 minutes
- Production companies: Scott Sternberg Productions; Columbia TriStar Television

Original release
- Network: Game Show Network
- Release: January 30, 1998 – June 1998

Jep! is an American children's television game show, adapted from the quiz show Jeopardy! It aired first on Game Show Network throughout the 1998–99 season, and then on Discovery Kids through late 2004.

It was hosted by voice actor Bob Bergen, and created by Scott Sternberg who had earlier created Wheel 2000, a children's version of Wheel of Fortune.

== Production ==
The show's production involved many of the daily syndicated Jeopardy!'s then-current personnel, including director Kevin McCarthy and four of the nine writers that the show employed at the time, and Alex Trebek, the main Jeopardy! series' host, served as Jep!'s consultant. Unlike the main Jeopardy! series, Jep! was taped at Stage 11 of the Sony Pictures Studios, rather than Stage 10.

== Format ==
Contestants on Jep! were children aged 10 through 12. When contestants are introduced, a logo of a multimedia company that was located in the contestants hometown, that is sponsoring the show, is shown next to their name. The game's difficulty level was substantially lower than that of the standard Jeopardy! game – making the show similar, in a way, to "Kids Weeks" on the parent program, which were introduced later. The players competed for merchandise packages instead of monetary prizes, and clue values were in points rather than in dollars (also used on Super Jeopardy!, Sports Jeopardy!, Rock & Roll Jeopardy!, Celebrity Jeopardy!, Jeopardy! The Greatest of All Time and Jeopardy! Masters).

Of the game's three rounds, the first round (the Jeopardy! round) became known as "Jep!", the second round (Double Jeopardy!) became "Hyper Jep!", and the third round (Final Jeopardy!) became "Super Jep!" There were five categories containing four clues apiece, and point values were randomly chosen by hitting a button. Jep! also featured a penalty system, in which three lights on each of the contestants' lecterns were designated "In Jeopardy!" lights which would turn on alongside the traditional deduction of points if the contestant gave an incorrect response or failed to phrase their response in the form of a question (even in the "Jep!" round).

The first incorrect response entitled the player's "vat" above them to fill up with toy items such as plastic frogs, balls, etc. When the second light turned on, the vat would open and spill the contents on the contestant. Once the last of these lights turned on, the contestant's chair would recede behind a wall bringing the contestant with it, locking them out of gameplay for one clue. Unlike its parent show, everyone played "Super Jep!". Players who had zero or a negative score at the end of "Hyper Jep!" would have their scores raised to 500. When this happened, the amount used to raise that player's score to 500 was added to the other players' scores to keep the differences the same.

In addition to the traditional Daily Doubles, Jep! also featured a "Jep! Prize" clue which awarded a prize to the contestant who responded correctly. Also featured was the Jep! Squad, a team of children from various places in America who functioned as correspondents delivering video clues, much like the parent program's later Clue Crew.

All three players got a choice of two prizes in increasing value depending on if the player finished third, second, and first.

== Critical reception ==
Steve Johnson of The Chicago Tribune rated Jep! with general favor, saying that Bergen was "mighty chipper, but in a tolerable way", but criticized the answers used on the show, saying they were "too easy". David Bianculli of New York Daily News wrote that "The purist in me would like to see Jep! without these Nickelodeon-style frills but even as is, it demands knowledge and is concerned with actual facts, so it deserves more credit than scorn."
