= Dan Patrick (sportscaster) =

American sportscaster (born 1956)

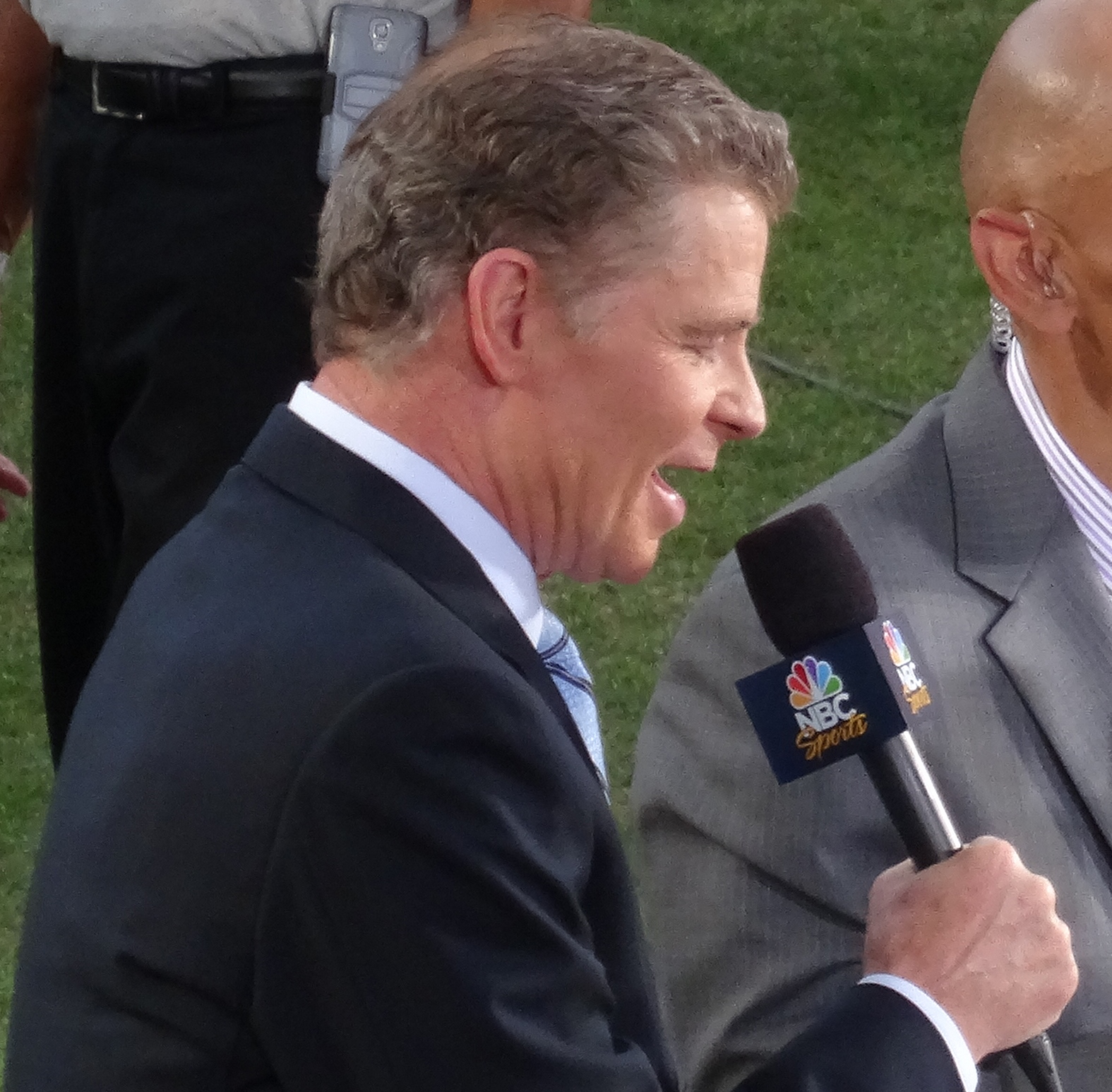
- Patrick on Football Night in America in 2013
- Born: Daniel Patrick Pugh; May 15, 1956 (age 70); Zanesville, Ohio, U.S.
- Education: University of Dayton
- Occupation: Sportscaster
- Years active: 1979–present
- Spouse: Susan White
- Children: 4
- Website: www.danpatrick.com

Daniel Patrick Pugh (born May 15, 1956), known professionally as Dan Patrick, is an American sportscaster, radio personality, and actor. He hosts The Dan Patrick Show broadcast on radio on Premiere Networks and streaming on Peacock. He co-hosted NBC's Football Night in America and served as a senior writer for Sports Illustrated. He worked at ESPN for 18 years, where he often anchored the weeknight and Sunday 11 p.m. edition of SportsCenter. He is unrelated to Bill Patrick, whom he often worked with on SportsCenter. He is also the host of the podcast "Dan Patrick Takes a Gamble", about sports wagering.

== Early life ==
Daniel Patrick Pugh was born in Zanesville, Ohio, to Pattie and Jack Pugh and grew up in Mason, Ohio in a family with six children, four boys and two girls. He was a baseball and basketball player in high school at William Mason High School, where he scored a single-game personal best of 36 points (he had four games with more than 30 points in an era before the three-point shot) and earned AP Class AA All-Ohio third-team honors. He graduated in 1974. Dan worked out during the Cincinnati Reds rookie camp as a short stop/pitcher. He ended up playing a small stint in Semi-Pro ball.

He attended Eastern Kentucky University on a basketball scholarship for two years before transferring to the University of Dayton, where he majored in communications. Patrick is an alumnus of the Eta Hexaton chapter of the Phi Sigma Kappa fraternity at Dayton. His father, Jack, worked in the computer science department at the university until he died of cancer in 1981 when Dan was 24.

== Career ==
Before working with ESPN, Patrick was known by his surname, "Dan Pugh", as an on-air personality with the album rock-formatted WVUD and WTUE in Dayton, Ohio (1979–1983). Patrick then became a sports reporter for CNN (1983–89), where his assignments included the World Series, NBA Finals and Winter Olympics. Patrick explained in an interview on December 10, 2021, with Zachary Levi that his boss at CNN said to adopt his middle name, Patrick, as his on-air last name. From 1989–1995, Patrick did a daily sports segment for Bob & Brian, a syndicated morning show in Milwaukee, Wisconsin and in the early 1990s, he did sports updates for the Columbus, Ohio rock station WLVQ and appeared on the morning show "Wags and Elliot."

=== ESPN ===
Patrick was an anchor on ESPN's SportsCenter (1989–2006). He also hosted The Dan Patrick Show on ESPN Radio from September 13, 1999, to August 17, 2007. In the mid-1990s, Dan and Keith Olbermann were among ESPN's most recognizable faces. Olbermann used the catch phrase "Welcome to the Big Show" when Patrick worked with him on SportsCenter. After getting reprimanded by their superiors, they began saying "This is SportsCenter" sarcastically, accidentally spawning the show's new catch phrase as well as the name of their long-running promotional campaign. When Olbermann left, Patrick said, "This isn't the Big Show anymore." Patrick stated on his radio program that the ABC sitcom Sports Night was a semi-fictional account of the Olbermann/Patrick anchored SportsCenter, with Casey McCall (Peter Krause) representing Patrick. Starting on March 19, 2006, until the final game of the NBA Finals, he became the host of ABC's then-titled NBA Nation, a pregame show for the network's NBA telecasts.

On July 9, 2007, on his radio show, Patrick announced his departure from ESPN/ABC effective August 17, 2007, stating, "I am leaving ESPN August 17 to go out on my own and be a free agent... I think I was starting to take it (ESPN) for granted," Patrick said. He said ESPN tried to talk him out of it. If there were any animosity, he says, "I wouldn't be sticking around until August." ESPN's statement released to the media said Patrick would be released from his contract August 31, 2007, exactly one year early from his deal that was to run until August 31, 2008. The statement also said it would be the final comment on Patrick's departure from ESPN. "ESPN contractually bans all employees from making specific announcements of their futures on their airwaves but out of respect to Dan and all he's done for ESPN we allowed him an opportunity to end the speculation".

Patrick remained off of the air from ESPN Radio until August 15 for his three farewell shows. He was originally reported to be returning for a final week but returned on Wednesday of that week. He named his final three shows the "Farewell for Now" tour. The last 20 minutes of his show were filled with thank-yous and looks back. Guests included Bob Costas, Bobby Knight, Joe Montana, Jerry Rice, Ken Griffey Jr., and other sports stars. Will Ferrell also made a heavily promoted appearance in character as Ron Burgundy. August 17, 2007, was Patrick's last day on ESPN Radio.

==== Reaction to Patrick's departure from ESPN/ABC ====
Reaction from media sources hit the internet by storm. Many webpages, blogs, and news media outlets speculated on the reasons for Patrick's departure and his possible future. On the July 10, 2007, The Dan Patrick Show, Keith Olbermann and Dan Patrick himself put some of the rumors and comments to rest. Patrick confirmed that he was asked by the producers of The Price Is Right to audition for the vacant host position but he declined. The job eventually went to Drew Carey. Patrick admitted he was hurt when good friend, Sports Illustrated writer Rick Reilly (who would move to ESPN) wrote, "Patrick was making one of the top 5 biggest career mistakes in entertainment history," ranking right under Shelley Long's leaving Cheers and Katie Couric's leaving NBC's Today show for the CBS Evening News.

Keith Olbermann said that it was only a matter of time before a website erroneously reported Patrick was fired from ESPN, which was what happened in some reports when Olbermann left ESPN. Patrick again stated he was leaving on good terms with ESPN and he could return to ESPN if he should so choose. Patrick said he wanted to be on both television and radio again, although some newspapers reported he only wanted to do radio.

On his new show, Patrick often relates anecdotes of his ESPN career, in both positive and negative lights. He often refers to his former employer as "The Mother Ship" (and less frequently, "ESPeon") and expresses disappointment with their practice of preventing their talent from appearing as guests on his show and frustration when an ESPN employee has agreed to come on the show only to cancel. Patrick is often critical of current ESPN shows and personalities (such as SportsNation, SportsCenter, First Take and former ESPN host Colin Cowherd) for stealing content from his show. In September 2015, Patrick was a guest on the debut episode of SVP, a midnight (EST) version of ESPN's flagship show, SportsCenter, designed as a single-host format hosted by Scott Van Pelt. The SVP SportsCenter allows for some creative empowerment for Van Pelt. This was strategically evident when Van Pelt's first in-studio interview was Patrick.

=== New radio-TV show/Sports Illustrated ===
Patrick signed a syndication deal with Chicago-based Content Factory, which launched his new version of The Dan Patrick Show on October 1, 2007. It was distributed nationally by Premiere Radio Networks. The show aired live on most stations from 9 a.m. to noon Eastern, although some delayed the show into the evening. The show ran delayed on Sirius XM Sports Nation on Sirius Radio channel 122 and XM Radio channel 143. It was also available as a livestream and in podcast form via Patrick's website.

In January 2009, Dan Patrick's show replaced Out of Bounds with Craig Shemon and James Washington on Premiere Radio's Fox Sports Radio network. An additional 60 affiliates were added to Patrick's portfolio in the process, bringing his affiliate count to over 200. It allowed SiriusXM Radio listeners to hear the show live on the Fox Sports simulcast on channel 247.

In August 2009, The Dan Patrick Show began to be broadcast on The 101 Network after a show of DIY Network in which a toy-filled "man cave" studio was built in Milford, Connecticut. The radio-only show had been produced in the attic of Patrick's home. The Dan Patrick Show features "The Danettes", who assist Dan with the show. The Dan Patrick Show became the first show to premiere on the Audience Network, DirecTV's rebranded version of The 101 Network on DirecTV channel 239 on June 1, 2011, where it aired until February 2020.

Sports Illustrated announced in October 2007 Patrick would become the magazine's senior writer contributing blogs to SI.com's "Fan Nation" and hosting the magazine's Sportsman of the Year show. SI collaborated with Content Factory to produce Patrick's website, and helped stream his radio show. Patrick talked about producing non-television content exclusively for Sports Illustrated. The Dan Patrick Show began simulcasting on Root Sports in October 2010, and on NBC Sports Network in November 2012.

=== NBC Sports ===
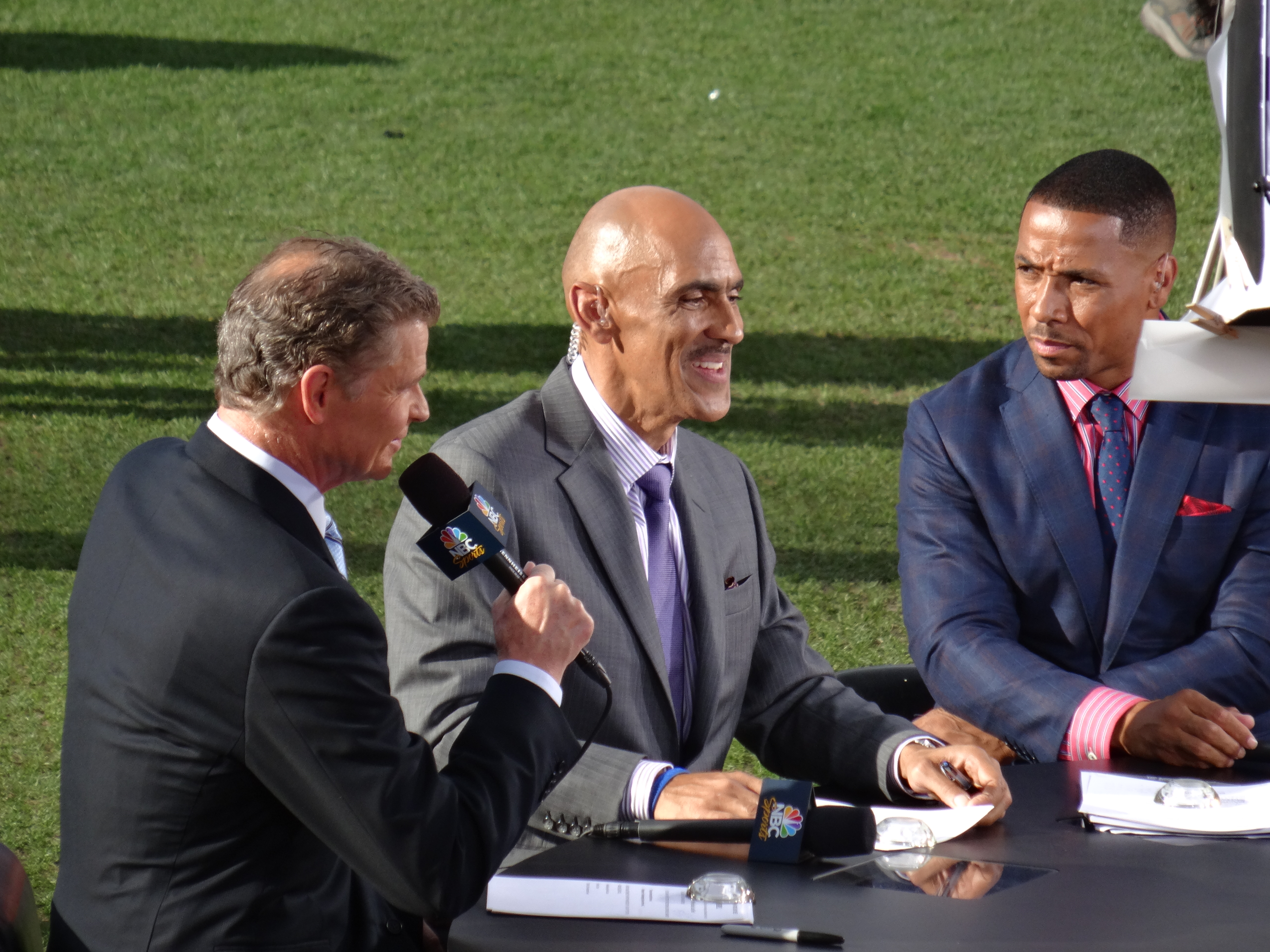
Patrick (left) along with colleagues Tony Dungy and Rodney Harrison at a home game with Denver against Baltimore, September 2013

On July 7, 2008, it was announced Patrick would join NBC Sports as a co-host of the third season of Football Night in America with former SportsCenter co-anchor Keith Olbermann every Sunday night beginning in September during the NFL season. Patrick and Olbermann host a series of highlights on the show and a segment called "The Little Big Show" with the day's top NFL plays. "The Little Big Show" refers to Patrick and Olbermann's time at ESPN where they referred to the 11pm SportsCenter they hosted as "The Big Show."

Patrick presented the Super Bowl XLIII trophy after the Pittsburgh Steelers won against the Arizona Cardinals, and again at Super Bowl XLVI after the New York Giants outlasted the New England Patriots. He contributed for the network at the 2010 Winter Olympics covering the women's downhill skiing and snowboarding. He hosted NBC's 2010 and 2011 Stanley Cup Finals coverage. In 2012, NBC named Patrick a daytime co-host with Al Michaels for the London Olympics. Patrick again served as the trophy presenter at Super Bowl XLIX when the New England Patriots defeated the Seattle Seahawks.

In March 2018, it was announced that Patrick would not return as the host of NBC's Football Night in America after turning down a contract offer. Soon afterwards it was announced that Patrick would take over hosting duties of Undeniable (with Joe Buck) on Audience Network.

=== Sports Jeopardy! ===
On April 29, 2014, it was announced that Patrick would host Sports Jeopardy!, a sports-themed version of Jeopardy! shown on Crackle. The series debuted September 24, 2014, and featured Alex Trebek as a special guest reading the Final Jeopardy! clue in the third episode. Its last episode aired on December 7, 2016.

== Sportscasting school with Full Sail University ==
In late October 2017, it was announced that Patrick would begin a Dan Patrick School of Sportscasting with Full Sail University in Winter Park, Florida.

== Personal life ==
Patrick met his wife, Susan White, when he worked at CNN and she was a producer of CNN's Inside Politics. They have three daughters and a son. He received the University of Dayton Distinguished Alumni Award in 1997 and was inducted into the Mason High School Athletic Hall of Fame in 2000.

== Other appearances ==
=== Film and television ===
Patrick has made cameo appearances in many movies and TV shows, usually as himself. Patrick has appeared in many Adam Sandler films after Sandler was snubbed by Patrick's long-time SportsCenter co-host Keith Olbermann for declining to play the announcer role in Happy Gilmore which ended up going to Verne Lundquist.

- The Definite Maybe (1997)
- Arli$$ (1998)
- BASEketball (1998)
- The Waterboy (1998)
- Clerks (Animated ABC program) (2000)
- Clone High (2002)
- The Longest Yard (2005)
- The Benchwarmers (2006)
- I Now Pronounce You Chuck & Larry (2007) as New York cop
- The House Bunny (2008)
- Grown Ups (2010)
- Blue Mountain State (2011)
- Just Go with It (2011)
- Jack & Jill (2011)
- That's My Boy (2012)
- Grown Ups 2 (2013)
- Blended (2014)
- The Ridiculous 6 (2015)
- The Do-Over (2016)
- The Week Of (2018)
- Hubie Halloween (2020)
- Home Team (2022)
- Hustle (2022)
- Happy Gilmore 2 (2025) as Pat Daniels

=== Music videos ===
Dan Patrick has appeared twice in music videos:

- The 1995 Hootie & the Blowfish song "Only Wanna Be with You." In the video, the group use their money to purchase several sports teams. Patrick said of the group, "Dare I say they're anything but 'en fuego'."
- In the 2002 Brad Paisley song "I'm Gonna Miss Her (The Fishin' Song)", with the quote "Brad Paisley, dare I say, 'en fuego'."
