= MJ Acosta-Ruiz =

Dominican-American sports reporter

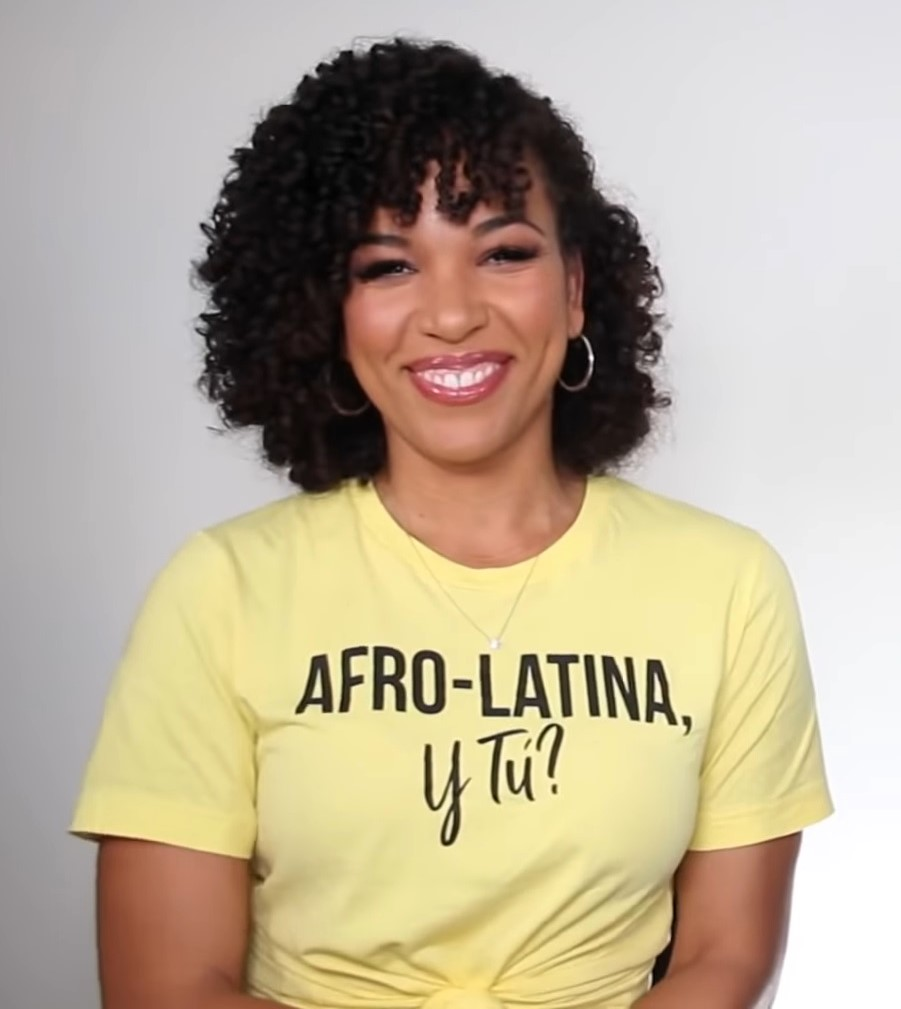
Acosta in 2019

Marjorie Acosta-Ruiz (born November 20, 1986), known professionally as MJ Acosta-Ruiz, is a Dominican-American sports reporter for NFL Network who joined ESPN as anchor of the Los Angeles edition of Sportscenter in 2024.

== Early life and education ==
Acosta grew up in Washington Heights, Manhattan in New York City before moving to Miami, Florida, where she attended Miami Sunset Senior High School and her father is a former professional basketball player from the Dominican Republic. Acosta attended Barry University, where she graduated in 2011 with a Bachelor of Arts degree in communications.

== Career ==
Acosta was an NFL cheerleader for the Miami Dolphins for the 2012 and 2013 seasons. Prior to joining Telemundo 20, Acosta was a sports reporter at WPLG-TV, the ABC's affiliate in Miami and Fort Lauderdale. Acosta was covering the NFL's San Diego Chargers as a reporter at Telemundo 20 in San Diego since joining the station in 2016. In August 2018, Acosta announced that she would be leaving San Diego's Telemundo 20 for NFL Network as their Bay Area-based reporter for the San Francisco 49ers and Oakland Raiders. Acosta-Ruiz joined ESPN in 2024 as anchor of Los Angeles edition of Sportscenter and serves as sideline reporter on Monday Night Football for ESPN Deportes.
