= Sports Jeopardy! =

American television quiz show

- Genre: Game show
- Based on: Jeopardy! by Merv Griffin
- Directed by: Kevin McCarthy
- Presented by: Dan Patrick
- Narrated by: Kelly Miyahara
- Theme music composer: Merv Griffin
- Country of origin: United States
- Original language: English
- No. of seasons: 3
- No. of episodes: 116

Production
- Executive producer: Harry Friedman
- Running time: 24 minutes
- Production company: Sony Pictures Television

Original release
- Network: Crackle
- Release: September 24, 2014 – December 7, 2016

Related
- Jeopardy!

Sports Jeopardy! is an American television game show adapted from the quiz show Jeopardy!. The show debuted on Crackle on September 24, 2014. Hosted by Dan Patrick, this version featured largely identical play to the parent program, but highlights sports trivia instead of general knowledge.

== Format ==
In fall 2014, Crackle, an online video streaming service owned by Sony, began exclusively carrying Sports Jeopardy!, a themed version of the show with material focused entirely on sports trivia. Dan Patrick was announced to host this spin-off. Kelly Miyahara, then a member of the Jeopardy! Clue Crew, served as an on-camera announcer. Howie Schwab served as off-camera judge and consultant. Each category had only four clues (250, 500, 750, and 1,000 in the Jeopardy! round, with those values doubled for Double Jeopardy!) compared to five in the parent series, plus, like its parent counterpart, Daily Doubles (one in Round 1, two in Round 2). As mentioned, dollar amounts were replaced with point amounts. The fewer clues allowed Patrick and the contestants more time to interact during the interview portion of the show and during a "postgame" segment during and after the closing credits.

In this version, contestants played for points, with the third- and second-place contestants winning $1,000 and $2,000 respectively (the same as the parent series) and the champ earning $5,000. For the first season, three new contestants competed on each episode. Returning champions were added in the second season. The top three scorers from the first season competed in a Tournament of Champions for a $50,000 top prize, which saw Justin Shibilski, a Yankees fan from Aurora, Illinois, defeat Steve Greene and Nate Marks to win the season championship. Three celebrity games were played on air, including two featuring personalities from host Dan Patrick's radio show, and one football-themed game starring NFL Network personalities.

Contestants from normal Jeopardy! games could try out for and compete on Sports Jeopardy!, with notable examples including prior Tournament of Champions competitors Cora Peck, Claudia Perry, Dan McShane, and Kate Waits. As well, season 1 championship finalist Steve Greene was a semifinalist in the regular Jeopardy!'s College Championship in November 2010. Likewise, Sports Jeopardy! contestants can compete on regular Jeopardy! episodes, such as prior two-day Sports Jeopardy! champion Ron Freshour in July 2018 and season 1 championship finalist Nate Marks in April 2019.

For season 2, which premiered on September 23, 2015, the show changed to allow each episodes winner to return for the next episode as the returning champion; however, if a game ended with all three players finishing with zero points, it would result in three new players competing the next episode. This is the same format followed by Jeopardy!, in which they could compete indefinitely unless beaten; a tie between two or three players with at least one point would result in a sudden-death answer playoff, in a pre-determined category. This was to allow the show to be seen as more easily binge-watched. Under the returning champions format, four contestants won five consecutive games, including 15-day champion Vinny Varadarajan, eight-day champion Earl Holland, six-day champion Eric Park, and five-day champion Roy Hollis. A Tournament of Champions for season 2-3 champions was not held.

In April 2016, Sports Jeopardy! was acquired for television by NBCSN. Starting on August 6, 2016, the program aired nightly for the duration of the 2016 Summer Olympics after the conclusion of nightly coverage, and moved to airing on Wednesday nights for the 2016–17 television season. New episodes have not aired since December 7, 2016, on any platform, with Sony Pictures officially noting that the show was "on hiatus". Sports Jeopardy! is no longer streaming on Crackle. Four years after Sports Jeopardy! ceased production, the main series began to use the theme and think music for its 2020 College Championship.

In a rare instance, Sports Jeopardy! was mentioned on the original show on March 18, 2025. Champion Alex DeFrank recounted winning the show with a photo of him shown on the stage. This, alongside two YouTube videos showcasing a single category, are the only instances of the show being preserved in any state.

== Episodes ==
Season	Episodes	Originally released	
Season	Episodes	First released	Last released
1	52	September 24, 2014	September 16, 2015
2	52	September 23, 2015	September 14, 2016
3	12	September 21, 2016	December 7, 2016

== See also ==
- The Dan Patrick Show
- ESPN Jeopardy!
