= Jeopardy! The Greatest of All Time =

American game show tournament

- Promotional poster
- Genre: Game show
- Based on: Jeopardy! by Merv Griffin
- Directed by: Clay Jacobsen
- Presented by: Alex Trebek
- Starring: Ken Jennings; Brad Rutter; James Holzhauer
- Narrated by: Johnny Gilbert
- Theme music composer: John Hoke (Bleeding Fingers Music) (Note: Original theme composed by Merv Griffin)
- Country of origin: United States
- Original language: English
- No. of seasons: 1
- No. of episodes: 4

Production
- Executive producer: Harry Friedman
- Production locations: Sony Pictures Studios; Culver City, California
- Production company: Sony Pictures Television

Original release
- Network: ABC
- Release: January 7 – January 14, 2020

Jeopardy! The Greatest of All Time is a special tournament limited-run series of the game show Jeopardy! that took place in January 2020. The tournament was produced for ABC and aired on the network in prime time. This was the second time a Jeopardy! competition aired on network television (regular shows air in syndication); the first occurred in 1990 when the special tournament series Super Jeopardy! was carried by ABC. This was the last major Jeopardy! tournament Alex Trebek hosted before his death later that year.

The tournament featured former champions Ken Jennings, Brad Rutter, and James Holzhauer competing for a $1 million top prize and the recognition of being the show’s greatest champion of all time.

Jennings won the tournament on January 14, 2020, with Holzhauer finishing second and Rutter third. With the $1 million prize added to his previous winnings across several game show appearances, Jennings surpassed Rutter as the highest-earning American game show contestant of all time, a record he had previously held twice. Jennings held this record until March 25, 2025, when David Genat won $5,800,000 on the NBC reality game show Deal or No Deal Island.

== Format ==
The tournament began on January 7, 2020, and each match consisted of two games. Each game was played as normal with the Jeopardy! and Double Jeopardy! rounds followed by Final Jeopardy!. Just like in Super Jeopardy!, the first two seasons of Rock & Roll Jeopardy!, Sports Jeopardy!, and the future Jeopardy! Masters, dollar amounts are replaced with point amounts. The contestant with the highest combined score from the two games would win the match, and the first one to three match wins won the tournament.

== Contestants ==
- Ken Jennings:
  Jennings first appeared on the program in 2004 and set two Jeopardy! records that he still holds. He won 74 consecutive matches, and his total of $2,522,700 is a record for non-tournament winnings, making him the second Jeopardy! contestant to win over $1 million and the first to do so in non-tournament play. Entering the tournament, his total Jeopardy! winnings totaled $3,372,700, which was second-highest behind fellow competitor Rutter. Jennings said he took part in the competition reluctantly, fearing that because of his age and repeated tournament losses to Rutter (Rutter having won every head-to-head matchup between the two except the IBM Challenge), he was past his peak as a Jeopardy! contestant. He agreed to compete largely out of respect for Alex Trebek and because it would be "almost certainly my last time" as a contestant.
- Brad Rutter:
  Rutter was the highest-earning American game show contestant of all time entering the tournament. He first appeared on Jeopardy! in October 2000, during the era of the program where contestants were retired after winning five consecutive matches and before the show doubled its question values. After winning $55,102 in his initial run, Rutter qualified for and won the 2001 Tournament of Champions, which at the time was played for $100,000. He was invited back in 2002 for the special Million Dollar Masters Tournament with several past champions, and emerged victorious again to become the first Jeopardy! contestant to win over $1 million. Shortly after Jennings’s run as champion ended, Rutter was one of the many former champions invited back for the 2005 Ultimate Tournament of Champions, where two of the former champions in the field would face Jennings in the final match for $2 million. Rutter defeated Jennings and Jerome Vered in the final to win the tournament, and the prize money made him the new all-time American game show winnings leader. He later defeated Jennings and Roger Craig in the 2014 Battle of the Decades tournament, winning an additional $1 million and reclaiming his spot at the top of the all-time winnings list from Jennings, who had retaken it in 2009. Rutter still holds the record as the highest-earning contestant (primarily from special tournament events) on Jeopardy! with a total of $4,688,436 entering the tournament. Rutter entered the tournament having never lost a match against a human, only coming up short in an exhibition match featuring him and Jennings taking on Watson in Jeopardy!: The IBM Challenge in 2011.
- James Holzhauer:
  Holzhauer entered the tournament the third-highest-earning Jeopardy! contestant of all time, behind Rutter and Jennings. He had won $2,714,216 entering the tournament, with $2,464,216 of that won in 33 matches in 2019, making him the third Jeopardy! contestant to win over $1 million and the second to do so in non-tournament play. He also won the 2019 Tournament of Champions several weeks before this tournament was announced, taking home an additional $250,000. Holzhauer is second behind Jennings in total winnings during regular play and, at the time, he was the only contestant besides Jennings to win more than 30 consecutive games. (Both Matt Amodio and Amy Schneider have since surpassed Holzhauer's record of 32 games.) Holzhauer's aggressive wagering on clues allowed him to set several new single-day winning records. He is the only contestant to win $100,000 in a single game, doing so six times, and also held the top 16 single-game scores in program history at the time. Jennings and Rutter said they had to mimic Holzhauer's aggressive style of play to stand a chance.

== Production ==
On November 18, 2019, ABC announced that the three highest-earning Jeopardy! contestants of all time—Jennings, Rutter, and Holzhauer—would compete in a best-of-seven prime-time tournament, Jeopardy! The Greatest of All Time. The first contestant to win three matches receives the title and a grand prize of $1 million. The others receive $250,000 each. The series was produced by Sony Pictures Television, with Harry Friedman executive producing and Alex Trebek hosting. This marked the first time Jeopardy! had aired on network television instead of in syndication since Super Jeopardy!, a prime-time tournament that aired in 1990 and was also hosted by Trebek. ABC had been the lead broadcaster of the syndicated version since the premiere of its 9th season in 1992, upon which it was picked up for most of the network's owned-and-operated stations. In addition to ABC, the tournament was broadcast in Canada on Yes TV and two of its partner stations, CHEK and NTV, all of which also carry the syndicated version. The series began taping on December 10, 2019.

== Episodes ==
| No. | Title | Original airdate | Winner | Winner's score | U.S. viewers (millions) | Series |
|---|---|---|---|---|---|---|
| 1 | "Match 1" | January 7, 2020 | Jennings | 63,400 | 14.42 | Holzhauer 0, Jennings 1, Rutter 0 |
| 2 | "Match 2" | January 8, 2020 | Holzhauer | 82,414 | 14.87 | Holzhauer 1, Jennings 1, Rutter 0 |
| 3 | "Match 3" | January 9, 2020 | Jennings | 67,600 | 15.55 | Holzhauer 1, Jennings 2, Rutter 0 |
| 4 | "Match 4" | January 14, 2020 | Jennings | 88,600 | 13.55 | Holzhauer 1, Jennings 3, Rutter 0 |

== Match summaries ==
=== Match 1 ===
| Game No. | Contestants' scores | | |
| Game No. | James Holzhauer | Ken Jennings | Brad Rutter |
|---|---|---|---|
| 1 | 33,200 | 45,000 | 10,400 |
| 2 | 30,000 | 18,400 | 0 |
| Total | 63,200 | 63,400 | 10,400 |

Jennings leads series, 1–0–0

=== Match 2 ===
| Game No. | Contestants' scores | | |
| Game No. | James Holzhauer | Ken Jennings | Brad Rutter |
|---|---|---|---|
| 1 | 44,314 | 40,000 | 14,400 |
| 2 | 38,100 | 17,400 | 0 |
| Total | 82,414 | 57,400 | 14,400 |

Holzhauer and Jennings tied, 1–1–0

=== Match 3 ===
| Game No. | Contestants' scores | | |
| Game No. | James Holzhauer | Ken Jennings | Brad Rutter |
|---|---|---|---|
| 1 | 27,200 | 51,200 | 17,600 |
| 2 | 6,492 | 16,400 | 5,867 |
| Total | 33,692 | 67,600 | 23,467 |

Jennings leads series, 2–1–0

=== Match 4 ===
| Game No. | Contestants' scores | | |
| Game No. | James Holzhauer | Ken Jennings | Brad Rutter |
|---|---|---|---|
| 1 | 34,181 | 65,600 | 0 |
| 2 | 0 | 23,000 | 1,400 |
| Total | 34,181 | 88,600 | 1,400 |

Jennings wins series 3–1–0

== See also ==
- Strategies and skills of Jeopardy! champions
