= Answers in the Form of Questions =

2020 book about Jeopardy! by Claire McNear

Answers in the Form of Questions: A Definitive History and Insider's Guide to Jeopardy!
- Author: Claire McNear
- Publisher: Grand Central Publishing
- Publication date: 2020
- ISBN: 9781538702321

Answers in the Form of Questions is a 2020 book about Jeopardy! by American author Claire McNear.

In addition to collecting the stories of past champions and the broader history of the game, the book goes into the histories of Alex Trebek and long-running champions including Ken Jennings, Brad Rutter and James Holzhauer. It also goes behind the scenes on some elements of the show's production.
