= Mattea Roach =

Canadian game show contestant (born 1998)

- Born: October 26, 1998 (age 28); Halifax, Nova Scotia, Canada
- Education: Trinity College, Toronto
- Occupation: Radio host
- Years active: 2022–present
- Known for: 23-game winning streak on Jeopardy!

Mattea Roach (born October 26, 1998) is a Canadian broadcaster and game show contestant who held a 23-game winning streak on the game show Jeopardy! from April 5, 2022, to May 6, 2022. Roach was the most successful Canadian to play Jeopardy! and is placed in sixth for all-time regular season wins. Roach won US$560,983 throughout their run, getting the correct response to 93 percent of buzzed-in clues. During their 24th game, they lost to Danielle Maurer by just US$1. With their streak, Roach qualified for the season's Tournament of Champions. Roach placed second in the first season of Jeopardy! Masters, which aired in 2023.

In August 2024, Roach was announced as the host of Bookends, a new CBC Radio show about books and literature, debuting September 8, 2024.

== Early life ==
Roach graduated from Sacred Heart School of Halifax and has family residing in Halifax and Cape Breton. They were raised for the first six years of their life and part of their adolescence in Halifax. They maintain some traditions from Sacred Heart's Catholic curriculum and frequently prayed the Hail Mary during their Jeopardy! introductions. They graduated from the University of Toronto with a bachelor's degree in sexual diversity studies, political science, and women and gender studies. At the time of their run, they worked as a Law School Admission Test (LSAT) tutor and lived in Toronto.

== Career ==
=== Jeopardy! ===
Throughout their run, Roach won 23 games and US$560,983, equivalent to over 700,000 Canadian dollars. At 23 years of age at the time of their winning streak, they were the youngest contestant to reach this total. At the time of the end of their run on May 6, 2022, they were fifth in total all-time regular season earnings and fifth in total regular-season wins. They are ranked sixth in total all-time regular season earnings, fifth in total regular-season wins, and tenth in all-time winnings (including tournaments) as of January 18, 2023. After winning their first game with $32,001, Roach proclaimed "My student loan is paid off."

Roach has said that when they arrived for their first game, they had expected to face off with Amy Schneider, whose 40-day streak had ended, unbeknownst to most, a few months before Roach started competing. The season in which they competed also included 10-plus-game winning streaks from Schneider, Matt Amodio, and Jonathan Fisher.

As the most successful Canadian, Roach lamented that the late former host and Canadian Alex Trebek was not still hosting the game. Of their game strategy, Roach has talked about focusing on the things that are controllable. They also called their strategy "bad", saying it was about minimizing loss versus gain maximization. Roach has stated that their favourite game show growing up was Wheel of Fortune but that they also grew up watching Jeopardy! In a May 2022 interview published in Vulture, Roach said that they would prefer Ken Jennings, who hosted the majority of their Jeopardy! episodes, to become the show's permanent host.

Roach was the only person on stage for Final Jeopardy! for their 12th game on April 20, 2022, the first time that scenario had occurred since October 13, 2020. Later, in their 17th appearance on April 27, 2022, Roach had exactly double the score of the second-place opponent, Ben Hsia, at the start of Final Jeopardy! Hsia bet all his earnings and responded to the clue correctly, tying him with Roach. Roach also responded correctly, betting only $1, winning the game by $1.

Roach lost their 24th game on May 6, 2022, bringing a close to their winning streak after they failed to provide the correct response in Final Jeopardy! The contestant who dethroned Roach was Danielle Maurer, a digital marketing manager from Peachtree Corners, Georgia, who finished with a winning total of $15,600, beating Roach by $1.

Roach appeared in the Jeopardy! Tournament of Champions that aired in November 2022 but lost to Andrew He.

Roach competed in the first season of Jeopardy! Masters, which aired in May 2023. In the finals, they finished second to James Holzhauer, winning $250,000 and an invitation to the next Masters competition.

=== Post-Jeopardy! ===
In September 2022, Roach was named as the new host of The Backbench, a biweekly political interview podcast from the Canadaland network of political and media analysis podcasts.

In 2023, they were a panelist on Canada Reads, championing the eventual winner, Kate Beaton's graphic novel Ducks: Two Years in the Oil Sands.

In August 2024, CBC Radio announced Bookends, a program about books and literature to be hosted by Roach, which will replace Writers & Company on the schedule.

In April 2025, Roach appeared on Top Chef alongside Jeopardy! champion Amy Schneider and actor Michael Cera (who competed on Celebrity Jeopardy! in January 2023).

== Personal life ==
Roach is a lesbian and queer. They use they/them pronouns. They have tattoos of Talking Heads quotes and have met Bill Gates.

In their May 4, 2022 episode of Jeopardy!, they spoke of having participated in Choir! Choir! Choir!'s 2018 show performing Rick Astley's 1987 hit "Never Gonna Give You Up" with Astley himself in attendance.

== See also ==
- List of notable Jeopardy! contestants
- Strategies and skills of Jeopardy! champions
