= Jeopardy! Masters =

American television quiz show

- Genre: Game show
- Created by: Merv Griffin
- Directed by: Russell Norman; Lucinda Owens Margolis
- Presented by: Ken Jennings
- Narrated by: Johnny Gilbert
- Ending theme: "Think!"
- Composers: John Hoke (Bleeding Fingers Music); Chris Bell Music & Sound Design (Note: Original theme composed by Merv Griffin)
- Country of origin: United States
- Original language: English
- No. of seasons: 4
- No. of episodes: 37

Production
- Executive producer: Michael Davies
- Producer: Ken Jennings
- Running time: 42 minutes
- Production company: Sony Pictures (Note: As Sony Pictures Television Studios in season 1, Sony Pictures Television in seasons 2 and 3)

Original release
- Network: ABC
- Release: May 8, 2023 – present

Related
- Jeopardy!

Jeopardy! Masters is an American game show hosted by Ken Jennings (former 74-game champion and winner of The Greatest of All Time tournament) on ABC. Each season features recent notable Jeopardy! champions competing against each other in a "Champions League-style" format. It premiered on May 8, 2023. In February 2024, the show would be renewed for a second season, which premiered on May 1, 2024. In March 2025, it was announced that the show was renewed for a third season, which premiered on April 30, 2025. In June 2026, it was announced that the show was renewed for a fourth season, which premiered on August 25, 2026.

== Contestants ==
=== Season 1 (2023) ===
The following six contestants, listed in order of finish, competed in the first Jeopardy! Masters competition:

- James Holzhauer: Won 32 straight games between April and June 2019, only to become the 3rd player to reach $1,000,000 in overall winnings on Jeopardy! and the 2nd to do it only in regular play. Won 2019 Tournament of Champions. Runner-up in The Greatest of All Time tournament. Holder of the fourth-longest winning streak and second-largest cash winnings in regular play. Holder of all top ten all-time single-game scores and fastest milestones. Total winnings of $2,964,216.
- Mattea Roach: Won 23 straight games between April and May 2022, only to become the 5th player to reach $1,000,000 in overall winnings on Jeopardy! and the 4th to do it only in regular play. Roach is the 1st Canadian to be on Jeopardy Masters. Total winnings of $572,983.
- Matt Amodio: Won 38 straight games between July and October 2021, only to become the 4th player to reach $1,000,000 in overall winnings on Jeopardy! and the 3rd to do it only in regular play. of the third-longest winning streak and third highest cash winnings in regular play. Total winnings of $1,529,601.
- Andrew He: Won 5 straight games before losing to Amy Schneider. 2022 Tournament of Champions runner-up. Total winnings of $259,365.
- Amy Schneider: Won 40 straight games between November 2021 and January 2022. Won 2022 Tournament of Champions. Holder of the second-longest winning streak and fourth-largest cash winnings in regular play. Total winnings of $1,634,800.
- Sam Buttrey: Won 2021 Professors Tournament. 2022 Tournament of Champions 3rd place finalist. Total winnings of $150,000.

As the three finalists, Holzhauer, Roach, and Amodio all received invitations to the season two Masters competition.

=== Season 2 (2024) ===
The following six contestants, listed in order of finish, competed in the second Jeopardy! Masters competition:

- Victoria Groce: Won one game in September 2005, defeating 19-game champion David Madden. Qualified as Jeopardy! Invitational Tournament winner, having been invited in part on the strength of quizzing activities following her Jeopardy! appearance, including as a chaser on The Chase. Total winnings of $623,801.
- Yogesh Raut: Won three straight games in January 2023. Qualified as 2024 Tournament of Champions winner. Total winnings of $598,403.
- James Holzhauer: Qualified as 2023 Masters champion. Total winnings of $3,614,216.
- Amy Schneider: Jeopardy! Invitational Tournament runner-up. Qualified as a wildcard contestant, chosen by producers. Total winnings of $1,782,800.
- Mattea Roach: Qualified as 2023 Masters runner-up. Total winnings of $897,983.
- Matt Amodio: Qualified as 2023 Masters 3rd place finalist. Total winnings of $1,718,601.

As the three finalists, Groce, Raut, and Holzhauer all received invitations to the season three Masters competition. However, Holzhauer declined his invitation and, therefore, dropped out of the season three Masters competition.

=== Season 3 (2025) ===
The following nine contestants, listed in order of finish, competed in the third Jeopardy! Masters competition:

- Yogesh Raut: Qualified as 2024 Masters runner-up. He became the 6th player to reach $1,000,000 in overall winnings on Jeopardy! with his result in that season. Total winnings of $1,098,403.
- Juveria Zaheer: The first contestant to win both the Second Chance competition and Champions Wildcard to advance to the Tournament of Champions. 2025 Jeopardy! Invitational Tournament co-runner-up and is the 2nd Canadian after Mattea Roach to be on Jeopardy Masters. Total winnings of $441,000.
- Victoria Groce: Qualified as 2024 Masters champion. Total winnings of $773,801.
- Isaac Hirsch: A 9-game champion. 2025 Tournament of Champions co-runner-up. Total winnings of $393,390.
- Matt Amodio: Qualified as 2025 Jeopardy! Invitational Tournament winner. Total winnings of $1,954,601.
- Roger Craig: Held the highest one-day winnings record of $77,000 between September 14, 2010, and April 9, 2019. He is also the 2011 Tournament of Champions winner, a 3rd place finalist in the Battle of the Decades, and a 2025 Jeopardy! Invitational Tournament co-runner-up. Total winnings of $656,200.
- Brad Rutter: All-time highest money winner in Jeopardy! history. Won five regular games and retired undefeated in 2000. Won five Jeopardy! Tournaments—2001 Tournament of Champions, Million Dollar Masters, Ultimate Tournament of Champions, Battle of the Decades, and All-Star Games. His win in the Million Dollar Masters makes him the 1st player to reach $1,000,000 in overall winnings on Jeopardy!. Jeopardy! The Greatest of All Time 3rd place finalist. Rutter takes the place of James Holzhauer, who qualified for this season as the 2024 Masters 3rd place finalist but opted not to compete for reasons unknown. Total winnings of $4,968,436.
- Adriana Harmeyer: A 15-game champion. 2025 Tournament of Champions co-runner-up. Total winnings of $441,600.
- Neilesh Vinjamuri: A 3-game champion. Qualified as 2025 Tournament of Champions winner. Total winnings of $321,099.

As the three finalists, Raut, Zaheer, and Groce all received invitations to the season four Masters competition.

=== Season 4 (2026) ===
The following six contestants, listed in order of finish, competed in the fourth Jeopardy! Masters competition:

- Yogesh Raut: Qualified as 2025 Masters champion. He became not only the first ever two-time Masters champion, but the first to accomplish that particular feat in back-to-back seasons. Total winnings of $1,598,403.
- Victoria Groce: Qualified as 2025 Masters 3rd place finalist. She became the 7th player to reach $1,000,000 in overall winnings on Jeopardy! with her result in that season. Total winnings of $1,023,801.
- Andrew He: Qualified as 2026 Jeopardy! Invitational Tournament winner. Total winnings of $684,365.
- Paolo Pasco: A 7-game champion. Qualified as 2026 Jeopardy! Tournament of Champions winner. Total winnings of $548,717.
- Long Nguyen: Qualified as Producer's Wildcard. 2026 Jeopardy! Invitational Tournament runner-up. Total winnings of $241,000.
- Juveria Zaheer: Qualified as 2025 Masters runner up. Total winnings of $491,000.

As the three finalists, Raut, Groce, and He all received invitations to the season five Masters competition.

== Tournament format ==
The tournament features six former Jeopardy! champions (nine in season 3) competing round-robin style, with the first season consisting of 10 hour-long episodes featuring two games each, for a total of 20 games. Initially, the producers intended to structure the tournament as a pure round-robin system with every possible combination of three players ($C(6,3) = 20$), without eliminations. This was adjusted to a three-round structure prior to production. For the second and fourth seasons, the number of episodes was reduced to nine (eighteen games total), with the same overall structure. In the third season, the tournament was a four-round structure.

Unlike traditional Jeopardy!, which is scored in dollars, all of the games in this tournament are scored in points, just like in Jep!, Super Jeopardy!, the first two seasons of Rock & Roll Jeopardy!, Sports Jeopardy!, ESPN Jeopardy!, and Jeopardy! The Greatest of All Time.

The producers have also used Jeopardy! Masters to experiment with variations to the Jeopardy! format. In the first season, each round began with the revelation to the television audience of the location of that round's Daily Double(s); this did not continue in subsequent seasons.

=== Knockouts ===
For season 3 only, the knockouts start with rematches of the previous year's Masters final & the current year's Tournament of Champions & Jeopardy! Invitational Tournament finals. The second round of games features the first round winners, first round 2nd places, & first round 3rd places. In all rounds except the finals, the winner of each game receives three match points, the first runner-up receives one match point, and the second runner-up or players who were eliminated from Final Jeopardy! receives no match points. Due to the nature of the match point scoring, anyone who wins a knockout game is guaranteed to advance to the quarterfinals.

After all knockout episodes, the match points are totaled; the top six contestants advance to the Quarterfinals, while the other three are eliminated from the competition.

=== Quarterfinals ===
The quarterfinals consist of several round-robin matches of two games each; in each episode, three of the contestants play each other in the first game, and the remaining three play in the second game. The second game of each episode except for the first pairs up the winners from the previous episode against another randomly-selected contestant who has not already played against both winners. For season 3 only, match points from the Knockouts carryover to a combined match point total, and the first round of quarterfinals games features the top 3 players in knockout points in game 1 and the remaining players in game 2.

After all quarterfinal episodes, the match points are totaled; the top four contestants advance to the semifinals, while the other two are eliminated from the competition.

There were seven quarterfinal episodes in the first season, six episodes in the second and fourth seasons, and three episodes in the third season.

=== Semifinals ===
The four remaining contestants play each other round-robin over four games, with each player sitting out one game, but the point structure is the same as the previous rounds. Match points from the Knockouts and Quarterfinals do not carry over and will reset to 0. The three highest-ranked players move on to the finals, while the lowest-ranked player is eliminated.

=== Finals ===
The three remaining players play each other in a two-game match, as is standard in the final round of most Jeopardy! tournaments. Players who end the Double Jeopardy! round with zero points or a negative score in either game will be eliminated from Final Jeopardy! that game and their score for that game is recorded as zero points. The player with the highest combined score over the two games is declared champion. Furthermore, the three players will be automatically qualified in the next edition of the tournament, though they have the option to decline the invitation and drop out of the tournament for any reason. Any ties will get broken in sudden-death category imposed to players; the first one with correct question wins it; however, if wrong, others can ring in to try to win it, but if all tied players are wrong the process is repeated until someone wins it.

=== Tiebreakers ===
Should either the knockouts, quarterfinals or semifinals end in a tie for match points, the following tie-breaking criteria are used, in order:

1. Number of wins
2. Number of total correct responses in that stage (including Final Jeopardy!)
3. Cumulative scores, excluding Daily Double and Final Jeopardy! wagers
4. Cumulative scores, excluding only Final Jeopardy! wagers

=== Prizes ===
- First place: $500,000, Trebek Trophy, $100,000 donation for a charity of their choosing, and invitation to the next Masters competition (Note: Finalists can choose to decline the invitaion and drop out of the next Masters competition.)
- Second place: $250,000 and invitation to the next Masters competition
- Third place: $150,000 and invitation to the next Masters competition
- Fourth place: $100,000 (Note: Awarded after the semifinals)
- Fifth place: $75,000 (Note: Awarded after the quarterfinals)
- Sixth place: $50,000
- Seventh, eighth and ninth place (season 3 only): $15,000 (Note: Awarded after the knockouts)

== Standings ==
=== Season 1 (2023) ===
==== Quarterfinals ====
Ranking	Contestant	Match points	Tiebreakers				Result
Ranking	Contestant	Match points	Games won	Correct responses (including FJ!)	Score (excluding FJ! & DD)	Score (excluding FJ!)	Result
1st	James Holzhauer	18	6	193	152,600	247,805	Qualified for semifinals
2nd	Andrew He	13	3	131	107,000	121,800	Qualified for semifinals
3rd	Matt Amodio	9	3	115	88,800	112,800	Qualified for semifinals
4th	Mattea Roach	8	2	112	75,000	86,400	Qualified for semifinals
5th	Amy Schneider	5	0	95	66,800	70,800	5th place
6th	Sam Buttrey	3	0	115	70,000	80,600	6th place

==== Semifinals ====
Ranking	Contestant	Match points	Tiebreakers				Result
Ranking	Contestant	Match points	Games won	Correct responses (including FJ!)	Score (excluding FJ! & DD)	Score (excluding FJ!)	Result
1st	James Holzhauer	9	3	72	51,400	70,000	Qualified for finals & Jeopardy! Masters season 2
2nd	Matt Amodio	3	1	44	36,200	46,200	Qualified for finals & Jeopardy! Masters season 2
3rd	Mattea Roach	2	0	50	35,000	44,400	Qualified for finals & Jeopardy! Masters season 2
4th	Andrew He	2	0	45	33,400	37,600	4th place

==== Finals ====
Contestant	Game 1 Score	Game 2 Score	Total Score	Result
James Holzhauer	34,315	9,481	43,795	Champion
Mattea Roach	24,800	16,885	41,685	Runner-up
Matt Amodio	12,000	3,200	15,200	3rd place

=== Season 2 (2024) ===
==== Quarterfinals ====
Ranking	Contestant	Match points	Tiebreakers				Result
Ranking	Contestant	Match points	Games won	Correct responses (including FJ!)	Score (excluding FJ! & DD)	Score (excluding FJ!)	Result
1st	Victoria Groce	16	5	150	132,200	190,005	Qualified for semifinals
2nd	Yogesh Raut	10	3	120	94,200	120,395	Qualified for semifinals
3rd	James Holzhauer	9	2	127	87,800	127,000	Qualified for semifinals
4th	Amy Schneider	6	1	86	59,000	73,400	Qualified for semifinals
5th	Mattea Roach	5	1	81	53,200	61,200	5th place
6th	Matt Amodio	2	0	89	50,200	49,800	6th place

==== Semifinals ====
Ranking	Contestant	Match points	Tiebreakers				Result
Ranking	Contestant	Match points	Games won	Correct responses (including FJ!)	Score (excluding FJ! & DD)	Score (excluding FJ!)	Result
1st	James Holzhauer	7	2	65	47,200	66,400	Qualified for finals (Note: As a result of being a finalist in season 2, James Holzhauer was invited to participate in season 3, but declined. Therefore, he has dropped out from season 3.)
2nd	Yogesh Raut	5	1	56	39,800	62,400	Qualified for finals & Jeopardy! Masters season 3
3rd	Victoria Groce	4	1	63	49,800	56,000	Qualified for finals & Jeopardy! Masters season 3
4th	Amy Schneider	0	0	26	6,400	6,400	4th place

==== Finals ====
Contestant	Game 1 Score	Game 2 Score	Total Score	Result
Victoria Groce	21,400	34,000	55,400	Champion
Yogesh Raut	19,200	26,710	45,910	Runner-up
James Holzhauer	28,309	9,708	38,017	3rd place

=== Season 3 (2025) ===
==== Knockouts ====
Ranking	Contestant	Match points	Tiebreakers				Result
Ranking	Contestant	Match points	Games won	Correct responses (including FJ!)	Score (excluding FJ! & DD)	Score (excluding FJ!)	Result
1st	Yogesh Raut	6	2	50	42,400	56,500	Qualified for quarterfinals
2nd	Victoria Groce	4	1	49	29,400	41,200	Qualified for quarterfinals
3rd	Roger Craig	4	1	29	12,000	18,000	Qualified for quarterfinals
4th	Juveria Zaheer	3	1	39	24,400	34,800	Qualified for quarterfinals
5th	Isaac Hirsch	3	1	30	19,400	24,400	Qualified for quarterfinals
6th	Matt Amodio	2	0	33	24,600	23,600	Qualified for quarterfinals
7th	Brad Rutter	1	0	29	22,000	22,000	7th place
8th	Adriana Harmeyer	1	0	22	12,800	14,200	8th place
9th	Neilesh Vinjamuri	0	0	25	13,200	13,200	9th place

==== Quarterfinals (Note: Statistics shown are combined totals from the Knockouts and the Quarterfinals.) ====
Ranking	Contestant	Match points	Tiebreakers				Result
Ranking	Contestant	Match points	Games won	Correct responses (including FJ!)	Score (excluding FJ! & DD)	Score (excluding FJ!)	Result
1st	Victoria Groce	13	4	125	96,200	105,000	Qualified for semifinals
2nd	Yogesh Raut	9	2	106	76,200	93,700	Qualified for semifinals
3rd	Juveria Zaheer	8	2	97	64,800	69,600	Qualified for semifinals
4th	Isaac Hirsch	6	2	62	41,000	46,000	Qualified for semifinals
5th	Matt Amodio	6	1	80	56,400	51,600	5th place
6th	Roger Craig	5	1	71	35,400	3,600	6th place

==== Semifinals ====
Ranking	Contestant	Match points	Tiebreakers				Result
Ranking	Contestant	Match points	Games won	Correct responses (including FJ!)	Score (excluding FJ! & DD)	Score (excluding FJ!)	Result
1st	Victoria Groce	9	3	74	60,200	62,000	Qualified for finals & Jeopardy! Masters season 4
2nd	Yogesh Raut	5	1	70	52,000	48,400	Qualified for finals & Jeopardy! Masters season 4
3rd	Juveria Zaheer	2	0	43	25,600	26,600	Qualified for finals & Jeopardy! Masters season 4
4th	Isaac Hirsch	0	0	30	11,000	13,600	4th place

==== Finals ====
Contestant	Game 1 Score	Game 2 Score	Total Score	Result
Yogesh Raut	0	41,601	41,601	Champion
Juveria Zaheer	0 (Note: Zaheer finished the "Double Jeopardy!" round with -1,000 and is eliminated from Final Jeopardy!.)	36,800	36,800	Runner-up
Victoria Groce	14,400	22,000	36,400	3rd place

=== Season 4 (2026) ===
==== Quarterfinals ====
Ranking	Contestant	Match points	Tiebreakers				Result
Ranking	Contestant	Match points	Games won	Correct responses (including FJ!)	Score (excluding FJ! & DD)	Score (excluding FJ!)	Result
1st	Victoria Groce	15	5	172	126,000	121,000	Qualified for semifinals
2nd	Yogesh Raut	12	3	106	69,000	69,800	Qualified for semifinals
3rd	Paolo Pasco	8	1	94	62,400	71,400	Qualified for semifinals
4th	Andrew He	5	1	89	53,000	50,400	Qualified for semifinals
5th	Long Nguyen	5	1	68	40,200	45,200	5th place
6th	Juveria Zaheer	3	1	86	60,600	68,400	6th place

==== Semifinals ====
Ranking	Contestant	Match points	Tiebreakers				Result
Ranking	Contestant	Match points	Games won	Correct responses (including FJ!)	Score (excluding FJ! & DD)	Score (excluding FJ!)	Result
1st	Victoria Groce	7	2	81	60,000	65,800	Qualified for finals & Jeopardy! Masters season 5
2nd	Andrew He	6	2	51	33,200	34,600	Qualified for finals & Jeopardy! Masters season 5
3rd	Yogesh Raut	2	0	48	31,200	25,200	Qualified for finals & Jeopardy! Masters season 5
4th	Paolo Pasco	1	0	33	23,600	29,200	4th place

==== Finals ====
Contestant	Game 1 Score	Game 2 Score	Total Score	Result
Yogesh Raut	29,800	26,201	56,001	Champion
Victoria Groce	18,800	14,200	33,000	2nd place
Andrew He	15,577	0	15,577	3rd place

Updated to games broadcast through September 8, 2026. Source:

== Episodes ==
The winner of each game and the final is highlighted in bold.

=== Series overview ===
Season	Episodes	Originally released	
Season	Episodes	First released	Last released
1	10	May 8, 2023	May 24, 2023
2	9	May 1, 2024	May 22, 2024
3	9	April 30, 2025	June 4, 2025
4	9	August 25, 2026	September 8, 2026

=== Season 1 (2023) ===
No. overall	No. in season	Title	Contestant 1 (score)	Contestant 2 (score)	Contestant 3 (score)	Original release date	U.S. viewers (millions)	Rating (18–49)
1	1	"Game 1"	Schneider (28,200)	Amodio (14,201)	**He** (28,401)	May 8, 2023	5.78	0.6
1	1	"Game 2"	**Holzhauer** (39,988)	Roach (6,199)	Buttrey (18,401)	May 8, 2023	5.78	0.6
2	2	"Game 3"	Buttrey (2,399)	Schneider (17,700)	**Roach** (22,401)	May 9, 2023	5.49	0.5
2	2	"Game 4"	He (9,600)	Holzhauer (0)	**Amodio** (27,400)	May 9, 2023	5.49	0.5
3	3	"Game 5"	**Holzhauer** (44,681)	Schneider (9,121)	Buttrey (20,600)	May 10, 2023	5.45	0.5
3	3	"Game 6"	He (20,700)	**Roach** (30,401)	Amodio (15,201)	May 10, 2023	5.45	0.5
4	4	"Game 7"	**He** (37,600)	Buttrey (0)	Schneider (9,800)	May 12, 2023	5.20	0.4
4	4	"Game 8"	**Holzhauer** (23,678)	Roach (5,958)	Amodio (-2,000) (Note: Eliminated from Final Jeopardy!)	May 12, 2023	5.20	0.4
5	5	"Game 9"	Roach (13,599)	**Amodio** (16,799)	Schneider (16,401)	May 15, 2023	5.80	0.7
5	5	"Game 10"	**Holzhauer** (23,999)	He (8,800)	Buttrey (0)	May 15, 2023	5.80	0.7
6	6	"Game 11"	**He** (15,100)	Roach (11,201)	Buttrey (2,799)	May 16, 2023	5.65	0.6
6	6	"Game 12"	**Holzhauer** (29,890)	Amodio (5,599)	Schneider (13,000)	May 16, 2023	5.65	0.6
7	7	"Game 13"	Roach (6,799)	**Amodio** (31,000)	Buttrey (14,000)	May 17, 2023	5.66	0.5
7	7	"Game 14"	**Holzhauer** (21,392)	He (9,600)	Schneider (3,000)	May 17, 2023	5.66	0.5
8	8	"Semifinals 1"	**Holzhauer** (30,401)	He (22,000)	Amodio (15,201)	May 22, 2023	5.81	0.5
8	8	"Semifinals 2"	**Holzhauer** (24,700)	He (12,484)	Roach (15,999)	May 22, 2023	5.81	0.5
9	9	"Semifinals 3"	**Holzhauer** (24,292)	Roach (10,886)	Amodio (0)	May 23, 2023	5.91	0.6
9	9	"Semifinals 4"	Roach (5,799)	He (15,199)	**Amodio** (32,800)	May 23, 2023	5.91	0.6
10	10	"The Finals (Note: Final is a two-legged tie. Scores listed first leg, second leg, total)"	**Holzhauer** (34,314 + 9,481 = 43,795)	Amodio (12,000 + 3,200 = 15,200)	Roach (24,800 + 16,885 = 41,685)	May 24, 2023	6.47	0.6

=== Season 2 (2024) ===
No. overall	No. in season	Title	Contestant 1 (score)	Contestant 2 (score)	Contestant 3 (score)	Original release date	U.S. viewers (millions)	Rating (18–49)
11	1	"Game 1"	Roach (7,089)	Amodio (800)	**Groce** (29,867)	May 1, 2024	4.20	0.4
11	1	"Game 2"	Holzhauer (13,210)	**Raut** (26,395)	Schneider (7,000)	May 1, 2024	4.20	0.4
12	2	"Game 3"	**Holzhauer** (46,108)	Roach (5,758)	Amodio (19,200)	May 6, 2024	4.32	0.4
12	2	"Game 4"	**Groce** (32,000)	Raut (20,401)	Schneider (11,801)	May 6, 2024	4.32	0.4
13	3	"Game 5"	**Raut** (36,400)	Amodio (14,400)	Schneider (14,401)	May 8, 2024	4.10	0.4
13	3	"Game 6"	**Groce** (23,999)	Holzhauer (11,200)	Roach (0)	May 8, 2024	4.10	0.4
14	4	"Game 7"	Amodio (16,000)	**Schneider** (36,001)	Roach (18,000)	May 10, 2024	3.73	0.3
14	4	"Game 8"	Groce (24,000)	**Raut** (36,001)	Holzhauer (14,732)	May 10, 2024	3.73	0.3
15	5	"Game 9"	**Groce** (50,000)	Holzhauer (31,514)	Amodio (2,200)	May 13, 2024	4.36	0.4
15	5	"Game 10"	Raut (0)	Schneider (2,399)	**Roach** (6,399)	May 13, 2024	4.36	0.4
16	6	"Game 11"	Raut (0)	**Holzhauer** (25,015)	Amodio (24,800)	May 15, 2024	4.17	0.4
16	6	"Game 12"	**Groce** (21,005)	Schneider (7,800)	Roach (2,800)	May 15, 2024	4.17	0.4
17	7	"Semifinals 1"	Groce (9,999)	**Raut** (36,001)	Holzhauer (13,098)	May 17, 2024	4.12	0.3
17	7	"Semifinals 2"	Raut (1)	**Groce** (27,200)	Schneider (-3,000)	May 17, 2024	4.12	0.3
18	8	"Semifinals 3"	Groce (10,800)	**Holzhauer** (20,278)	Schneider (1,200)	May 20, 2024	4.45	0.4
18	8	"Semifinals 4"	**Holzhauer** (49,601)	Raut (32,001)	Schneider (16,200)	May 20, 2024	4.45	0.4
19	9	"The Finals"	**Groce** (21,400 + 34,000 = 55,400)	Holzhauer (28,309 + 9,708 = 38,017)	Raut (19,200 + 26,710 = 45,910)	May 22, 2024	4.56	0.5

=== Season 3 (2025) ===
No. overall	No. in season	Title	Contestant 1 (score)	Contestant 2 (score)	Contestant 3 (score)	Original release date	U.S. viewers (millions)	Rating (18–49)
20	1	"Knockout 1"	Groce (14,000)	**Raut** (30,800)	Rutter (2,178)	April 30, 2025	3.12	0.3
20	1	"Knockout 2"	Amodio (16,001)	**Craig** (21,201)	Zaheer (16,000)	April 30, 2025	3.12	0.3
21	2	"Knockout 3"	Vinjamuri (3,599)	**Hirsch** (20,000)	Harmeyer (4,400)	May 7, 2025	2.35	0.2
21	2	"Knockout 4"	**Raut** (15,700)	Hirsch (3,199)	Craig (5,599)	May 7, 2025	2.35	0.2
22	3	"Knockout 5"	**Groce** (27,200)	Amodio (13,601)	Harmeyer (13,300)	May 14, 2025	2.61	0.2
22	3	"Knockout 6"	Vinjamuri (0)	**Zaheer** (20,800)	Rutter (4,799)	May 14, 2025	2.61	0.2
23	4	"Quarterfinals 1"	Raut (13,600)	**Groce** (18,001)	Craig (10,399)	May 20, 2025	2.57	0.2
23	4	"Quarterfinals 2"	Zaheer (13,599)	Hirsch (4,990)	**Amodio** (21,000)	May 20, 2025	2.57	0.2
24	5	"Quarterfinals 3"	**Groce** (22,399)	Raut (9,599)	Amodio (1,200)	May 21, 2025	2.59	0.2
24	5	"Quarterfinals 4"	Zaheer (12,000)	Craig (10,001)	**Hirsch** (12,001)	May 21, 2025	2.59	0.2
25	6	"Quarterfinals 5"	**Groce** (16,000)	Raut (13,201)	Hirsch (5,600)	May 27, 2025	2.65	0.2
25	6	"Quarterfinals 6"	**Zaheer** (17,601)	Amodio (10,800)	Craig (-400)	May 27, 2025	2.65	0.2
26	7	"Semifinals 1"	**Groce** (20,001)	Raut (12,001)	Zaheer (8,000)	May 28, 2025	2.95	0.3
26	7	"Semifinals 2"	**Groce** (18,801)	Raut (18,799)	Hirsch (7,398)	May 28, 2025	2.95	0.3
27	8	"Semifinals 3"	**Groce** (29,800)	Hirsch (1,300)	Zaheer (7,400)	June 4, 2025	3.52	0.3
27	8	"Semifinals 4"	**Raut** (20,801)	Zaheer (10,400)	Hirsch (4,215)	June 4, 2025	3.52	0.3
28	9	"The Finals"	Groce (14,400 + 22,000 = 36,400)	**Raut** (0 + 41,601 = 41,601)	Zaheer (0 + 36,800 = 36,800)	June 4, 2025	3.39	0.3

=== Season 4 (2026) ===
No. overall	No. in season	Title	Contestant 1 (score)	Contestant 2 (score)	Contestant 3 (score)	Original release date	U.S. viewers (millions)	Rating (18–49)
29	1	"Quarterfinals 1"	He (2,200)	**Pasco** (17,675)	Nguyen (4,800)	August 25, 2026	3.37	0.26
29	1	"Quarterfinals 2"	Raut (12,401)	Zaheer (7,599)	**Groce** (24,801)	August 25, 2026	3.37	0.26
30	2	"Quarterfinals 3"	Nguyen (999)	He (5,999)	**Zaheer** (20,000)	August 26, 2026	3.63	0.37
30	2	"Quarterfinals 4"	Groce (1,778)	Pasco (4,800)	**Raut** (9,601)	August 26, 2026	3.63	0.37
31	3	"Quarterfinals 5"	**Groce** (16,001)	He (8,600)	Nguyen (15,601)	August 27, 2026	3.41	0.25
31	3	"Quarterfinals 6"	Pasco (4,799)	**Raut** (8,799)	Zaheer (0)	August 27, 2026	3.41	0.25
32	4	"Quarterfinals 7"	Pasco (4,801)	Zaheer (2,400)	**Nguyen** (19,999)	August 28, 2026	3.11	0.26
32	4	"Quarterfinals 8"	Raut (9,601)	**Groce** (34,567)	He (0)	August 28, 2026	3.11	0.26
33	5	"Quarterfinals 9"	**Raut** (22,801)	Zaheer (11,600)	He (18,300)	September 1, 2026	3.62	0.32
33	5	"Quarterfinals 10"	**Groce** (18,399)	Pasco (1)	Nguyen (0)	September 1, 2026	3.62	0.32
34	6	"Quarterfinals 11"	Pasco (13,801)	Zaheer (12,501)	**He** (15,300)	September 2, 2026	N/A	TBA
34	6	"Quarterfinals 12"	**Groce** (24,633)	Raut (7,200)	Nguyen (3,602)	September 2, 2026	N/A	TBA
35	7	"Semifinals 1"	**Groce** (34,567)	Raut (7,600)	Pasco (5,599)	September 3, 2026	3.62	0.31
35	7	"Semifinals 2"	**Groce** (28,282)	Raut (23,201)	He (15,600)	September 3, 2026	3.62	0.31
36	8	"Semifinals 3"	Groce (5,199)	**He** (5,684)	Pasco (5,196)	September 4, 2026	3.47	0.29
36	8	"Semifinals 4"	**He** (17,733)	Raut (14,401)	Pasco (14,500)	September 4, 2026	3.47	0.29
37	9	"The Finals"	Groce (18,800 + 14,200 = 33,000)	**Raut** (29,800 + 26,201 = 56,001)	He (15,577 + 0 = 15,577)	September 8, 2026	3.75	0.31
