= James Holzhauer =

American game show contestant and poker player (born 1984)

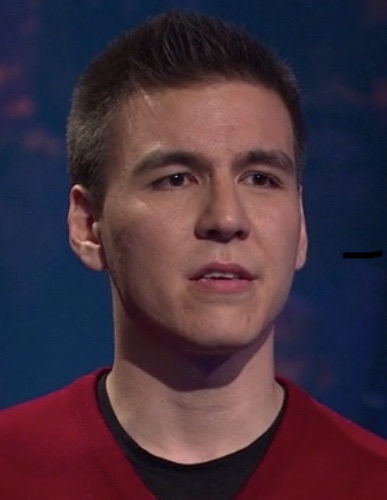
- Holzhauer on The Chase in 2014
- Born: August 6, 1984 (age 42); Naperville, Illinois, US
- Education: University of Illinois Urbana-Champaign (BS)
- Occupations: Sports gambler; game show contestant
- Known for: 32-game Jeopardy! winning streak
- Spouse: Melissa Sassin (m. 2012)
- Children: 1

James Holzhauer (born August 6, 1984) is an American game show contestant and professional sports gambler. He is the fourth-highest-earning American game show contestant of all time. Holzhauer is best known for his 32-game winning streak as champion on the quiz show Jeopardy! from April to June 2019, during which he set multiple single-game records for winnings, and for winning the following Tournament of Champions that November.

Holzhauer won $2,464,216 in his 33 appearances, making him the second-highest winner in Jeopardy! regular-play (non-tournament) winnings (behind only Ken Jennings, who won $2,520,700 in 2004) and, at the time, second in number of games won (again behind only Jennings) although he has since been surpassed by Matt Amodio (38 games) and Amy Schneider (40). His $250,000 top prize in the Tournament of Champions, $250,000 runner-up prize in the Greatest of All Time Tournament and $500,000 first prize in the inaugural Masters tournament brought his total to $3,464,216, making him still the third-highest winning Jeopardy! contestant, behind Jennings and Brad Rutter. Holzhauer also set the single-game winnings record with $131,127 and holds all top 10 single-game winning records. Based on his success on Jeopardy!, Holzhauer has been nicknamed "Jeopardy James".

== Early life ==
Born on August 6, 1984, Holzhauer was raised in Naperville, Illinois. His father was a German immigrant. His maternal grandmother was Japanese and spoke very little English; he had promised her that he would appear on Jeopardy! before she died. In 1989, when Holzhauer was four, his teacher was astounded by his mathematical abilities and developed advanced classwork just for him. At age seven, Holzhauer was moved up to a fifth-grade math class, and skipped second grade at his mother's urging. Holzhauer consistently got A's on math tests and competed on the Naperville North High School math team.

Despite high marks on individual tests, Holzhauer was a C student overall, as he often shunned his classes on the grounds that he could use the time more "productively", such as playing online poker. Holzhauer memorized obscure baseball and professional wrestling statistics, prompting his parents to reprimand him for "wasting his life" learning about sports.

Holzhauer was a member of the Worldwide Youth in Science and Engineering Team that won the state competition at the University of Illinois Urbana-Champaign; he contributed by taking first place in physics and second in math. Holzhauer graduated with a Bachelor of Science degree in mathematics in 2005.

== Career ==
=== Game show appearances ===
==== The Chase ====
Holzhauer's record-setting Cash Builder round on The Chase

Holzhauer appeared on the American version of the quiz show The Chase on September 2, 2014. In his first round, a one-minute round called the Cash Builder, Holzhauer correctly answered 12 questions out of 13 posed by host Brooke Burns; the last question was asked just before time expired and was quickly passed on by Holzhauer. His score set a record for the Cash Builder that was never surpassed during the show's run.

In his second round, Holzhauer faced Mark Labbett to determine whether he would advance to the final round and add money to the team prize pool. Holzhauer had a choice of three amounts to play for: $60,000 based on his score in the Cash Builder, $30,000 to reduce the difficulty of the round; and $120,000, which would increase the difficulty. He chose to play for $60,000; after the show, Holzhauer said that the odds did not favor playing for the maximum amount and that it was not worth the gamble.

The Chase was played head-to-head, with the players using hidden buttons to select multiple-choice answers. Holzhauer advanced to the finals and added to the prize pool with a score of five right and one wrong. Labbett scored a perfect five, with his final answer not revealed since Holzhauer had already achieved the necessary points to win the round.

In the Final Chase round (as team leader with two other contestants also participating), Holzhauer's team defeated Labbett by a score of 26 to 9, earning him a $58,333.33 share of the $175,000 team prize pool. By answering 19 questions correctly for his team, he set a Final Chase record, which was also never surpassed.

Bob Boden, the producer of The Chase, was impressed by Holzhauer's performance and had him audition to join the show as a colleague of Labbett. In July 2020, Holzhauer and several other famous game show contestants were said to be in negotiations to become chasers for a potential reboot of The Chase, which would be produced for ABC. The reboot starring Holzhauer, Ken Jennings, and Brad Rutter premiered January 7, 2021, on ABC.

==== 500 Questions ====
Holzhauer appeared on the American quiz show 500 Questions on May 22, 2015. This show did not allow the challenger to replace the champion unless the champion answered three questions wrong in a row. The incumbent champion, Steve Bahnaman, prevailed over Holzhauer, who did not receive any winnings.

==== Jeopardy! ====
External videos
- Highlights from Holzhauer's 32-game winning streak on Jeopardy!

Holzhauer appeared on 33 episodes of Season 35 of the American quiz show Jeopardy!, from April 4 to June 3, 2019.

During his first game, Holzhauer won $43,680, the second largest single-game total to that point in Season 35, behind fellow Tournament of Champions competitor Eric R. Backes' $48,001 on February 11, 2019. In his fourth game, which aired on April 9, Holzhauer broke the previous single-game Jeopardy! winnings record with a one-day score of $110,914, which surpassed the 45-year old record of Robert H. Smith, Jr., whose $3,900 from September 14, 1973, when adjusted to clue values since November 26, 2001, was $78,000. That also surpassed the gross winnings record of $77,000, set by Roger Craig in 2010.

During his appearances, Holzhauer exceeded Smith's single-day total 16 times (see table below), including a new all-time record set on April 17, when he won $131,127. Holzhauer is also the first and only player to win $100,000 or more in a single episode, a feat that he accomplished six times. His $298,687 total winnings across his first five days surpassed the five-day record set by Frank Spangenberg in 1990 before the changes in the values of the clues. Holzhauer is the only contestant to date to do so. He won a total of $2,464,216, averaging $75,362 per episode—a 33-day average that nearly equaled the previous all-time single-day record. Fellow Jeopardy! champion Ken Jennings has likened this feat to "a basketball player notching 70-point games for an entire season or a baseball player hitting for the cycle in every game".

Holzhauer was defeated in his 33rd game, which aired on June 3, 2019, and was watched by 14.5 million people. The winner, Emma Boettcher, used many of the same strategies as Holzhauer.

In July 2019, Jeopardy! confirmed that Holzhauer would return for the Tournament of Champions in November. Holzhauer won both his quarterfinal and semifinal games to advance to the final round, which featured a rematch against Boettcher, who was invited separately and also won her first two tournament games. Holzhauer won the two-day final, winning the first game by a larger margin than Boettcher won the second and claiming the $250,000 grand prize. The following week, Jeopardy! announced that Holzhauer would compete against Jennings and Rutter in prime-time specials for a million-dollar prize in Jeopardy! The Greatest of All Time, which aired in January 2020. Holzhauer won one match in the tournament, but lost to Jennings in the others, and received the runner-up prize of $250,000.

===== Jeopardy! Masters =====
On May 8, 2023, Holzhauer placed second in the first round of Jeopardy! Masters; despite knowing the Final Jeopardy! question, he wrote in an "answer" challenging Ken Jennings to a tournament. In spite of this, he won his bracket as he was far ahead of (over 20,000 points) the other competitors. He entered Final Jeopardy! with a lead (40,800 points). Earlier in the day, he had teased that he would be the "villain" of the tournament. On May 24, 2023, Holzhauer won the Masters tournament, edging out Mattea Roach and Matt Amodio to earn the $500,000 grand prize.

On May 22, 2024, Holzhauer wrapped up part one of the two part finals with a total of 28,309 points to hold a sizable lead going into part two of the finals, but ultimately he finished in third with a total of 38,017 behind winner Victoria Groce who finished with a total of 55,400 and runner up Yogesh Raut who finished with a total of 45,910.

===== Regular play winnings =====
Game no.	Air date	Final score	Cumulative winnings	Notes
1	April 4	$43,680	$43,680	
2	April 5	$38,926*	$82,606	
3	April 8	$50,845	$133,451	
4	April 9	$110,914†	$244,365	First breaks record of Robert H. Smith, Jr., whose $3,900 from 1973, when adjusted to decupled clue values when the 1984 version premiered was adjusted to $39,000, then further doubled in 2001, was adjusted to $78,000 and surpassed the gross winnings record of $77,000, set by Roger Craig in 2010. Also breaks first five days winnings record. (previously $205,194 held by Frank Spangenberg wafter adjusting for clue values)
5	April 10	$54,322	$298,687	
6	April 11	$27,190	$325,877	Only game during his 32-day winning streak in which he failed to give a correct response in Final Jeopardy
7	April 12	$89,158	$415,035	
8	April 15	$45,444	$460,479	Reached second-place on all-time Jeopardy! regular play winnings list.
9	April 16	$106,181†	$566,660	
10	April 17	$131,127†	$697,787	Broke his own single-day winnings record.
11	April 18	$74,133	$771,920	
12	April 19	$80,006	$851,926	
13	April 22	$90,812†	$942,738	
14	April 23	$118,816†	$1,061,554	Became second Jeopardy! contestant to win $1 million in regular gameplay winnings and the fastest contestant to hit the milestone.
15	April 24	$73,621	$1,135,175	Moved into #10 on American game show winnings list, including $58,333 he won in 2014 on The Chase.
16	April 25	$90,812†	$1,225,987	Moved up to #9 on American game show winnings list
17	April 26	$49,600	$1,275,587	
18	April 29	$54,017*	$1,329,604	Narrowest margin of victory, winning by $18. Challenger Adam Levin's final total of $53,999 is the highest second place regular play total in Jeopardy! history.
19	April 30	$96,726†	$1,426,330	
20	May 1	$101,682†	$1,528,012	Moved up to #8 on American game show winnings list.
21	May 2	$80,615	$1,608,627	Passes Julia Collins for second-longest winning streak in regular play.
22	May 3	$82,381	$1,691,008	Holzhauer's run went on a two-week hiatus after this broadcast while Jeopardy! aired the Teachers Tournament following this episode.
23	May 20	$89,229†	$1,780,237	Moved up to #6 on American game show winnings list
24	May 21	$86,905	$1,867,142	Moved up to #5 on American game show winnings list
25	May 22	$71,885	$1,939,027	
26	May 23	$52,108*	$1,991,135	
27	May 24	$74,400	$2,065,535	Became second Jeopardy! contestant to win $2 million in regular gameplay winnings and the fastest contestant to do so.
28	May 27	$130,022†	$2,195,557	Moved to #4 on American game show winnings list
29	May 28	$59,381	$2,254,938	
30	May 29	$69,033	$2,323,971	
31	May 30	$58,612	$2,382,583	
32	May 31	$79,633	$2,462,216	
33	June 3	$24,799‡	$2,464,216	Defeated by challenger Emma Boettcher, who finished the game with $46,801. Holzhauer trailed Boettcher heading into Final Jeopardy!, the first time he trailed a challenger at that point of the game. He was awarded the then-standard $2,000 prize for finishing in second place.

† Green background denotes an addition to Holzhauer's exclusive hold of the top ten positions on Jeopardy!'s single-day winnings list
* Yellow background denotes game which was not a runaway (lead going into Final Jeopardy round could not guarantee a win).
‡ Red background denotes game in which Holzhauer is defeated.

===== Tournaments =====
2019 Jeopardy! Tournament of Champions
Round	Air date	Final score	Cumulative winnings	Notes
QF	November 6, 2019	$30,635	$2,714,216	
SF	November 12, 2019	$30,156	$2,714,216	
F1	November 14, 2019	$49,326	$2,714,216	Aggregate total of $76,923 surpassed his nearest opponent Emma Boettcher, though Boettcher had the higher score in game two of the final. Holzhauer wins first place prize of $250,000, and moved up to #3 on American game show winnings list.
F2	November 15, 2019	$27,597†	$2,714,216	Aggregate total of $76,923 surpassed his nearest opponent Emma Boettcher, though Boettcher had the higher score in game two of the final. Holzhauer wins first place prize of $250,000, and moved up to #3 on American game show winnings list.

Greatest of All Time
Match.Game	Air Date	Final score	Cumulative Winnings	Notes
1.1	January 7, 2020	33,200	$2,964,216	Holzhauer lost game one to Ken Jennings and won game two. However, his aggregate total for match one (63,200) was less than the 63,400 points by Jennings, the winner of the match.
1.2	January 7, 2020	30,000†	$2,964,216	Holzhauer lost game one to Ken Jennings and won game two. However, his aggregate total for match one (63,200) was less than the 63,400 points by Jennings, the winner of the match.
2.1	January 8, 2020	44,314†	$2,964,216	Finished in first place with an aggregate total for match two of 82,414. Holzhauer and Jennings were tied at one match apiece.
2.2	January 8, 2020	38,100†	$2,964,216	Finished in first place with an aggregate total for match two of 82,414. Holzhauer and Jennings were tied at one match apiece.
3.1	January 9, 2020	27,200	$2,964,216	Aggregate total for match 3 (33,692) was less than the 67,600 points by Jennings, who won the match. Jennings led the tournament, with two matches to Holzhauer's one.
3.2	January 9, 2020	6,492	$2,964,216	Aggregate total for match 3 (33,692) was less than the 67,600 points by Jennings, who won the match. Jennings led the tournament, with two matches to Holzhauer's one.
4.1	January 14, 2020	34,181	$2,964,216	Aggregate total for match 4 (34,181) was less than the 88,600 points by Jennings, who won the match and the tournament. Holzhauer earned the runner-up prize of $250,000.
4.2	January 14, 2020	0	$2,964,216	Aggregate total for match 4 (34,181) was less than the 88,600 points by Jennings, who won the match and the tournament. Holzhauer earned the runner-up prize of $250,000.

Green background indicates a match won by Holzhauer. A † indicates Holzhauer won an individual game.
Red background indicates matches Holzhauer lost an individual game.

===== Strategies =====
Holzhauer took a two-pronged approach to play. He selected the highest-value clues first in an attempt to maximize the money he had available to wager when he hit a Daily Double. This strategy does not always work, as a Daily Double is more likely to be behind a high-value clue, and often he hit the Daily Double before accumulating a large sum to wager. On Daily Doubles and during Final Jeopardy! clues, Holzhauer bet aggressively; his average wager on Daily Doubles was $9,000.

While aggressive betting is disadvantageous if a player responds incorrectly, Holzhauer was correct on 72 of the 76 Daily Doubles he hit (94.7%). This strategy was not entirely new; Alex Jacob, also a professional gambler, used a similar strategy in his six regular-play wins in April 2015 and the 2015 Tournament of Champions, which he won.

Excluding Daily Doubles and Final Jeopardy! wagers, Holzhauer's average score of $30,800 during his 32-episode winning streak (57% of the $54,000 available in each game) is higher than the $28,786 averaged by Jennings, who was far more conservative in his wagering; Holzhauer considered it more logical to make large bets that will usually pay off, because during the first 25 episodes of his winning streak, Holzhauer averaged 35.5 correct and only 1.04 wrong responses per game. On the episode he lost, Holzhauer did not respond to any clues incorrectly. He credited reading fact books written for children, with their heavy use of infographics, with allowing him to learn vast amounts of information in an easily digestible manner. Holzhauer took a year off from his occupation as a sports gambler to study for Jeopardy!.

===== Response to game play =====
Holzhauer's record-breaking winning streak attracted considerable reaction and media attention. When Holzhauer reached $1 million in 14 games and subsequently $2 million in 27 games, both of which being the fastest milestones, Craig, who held the single-game winnings record before Holzhauer, said, "To me, it's clear that he's one of the top players of all time already." Jennings said he was "just gobsmacked by James", adding, "It's absolutely insane what he's doing." Of Holzhauer's strategies, Jennings said, "he's got these incredibly confident wagers. He's maximizing money. He can make two or three times what any other player ever has with that same level of play, which again is top-shelf. He's as good as anybody." Jennings adopted Holzhauer's wagering strategy in the Greatest of All Time tournament, a factor in his victory. Labbett, meanwhile, recalled Holzhauer's The Chase appearance as "the worst beating I've ever had", adding, "I've got to give Jeopardy! immense credit, and The Chase U.S.A. In Britain or Australia, James would not have made it onto television, because he's just too damn good. They would never have him on."

===== Television ratings =====
Nielsen ratings for Jeopardy! rose 11% nationally during the first two weeks of Holzhauer's run and as much as 50% in select local markets, with a continuing upward trend over the course of his streak; by the fourth week of his run, ratings were up 30% nationwide and had doubled in select markets. Former Game Show Network executive Bob Boden said the ratings would help compensate for any short-term financial losses Holzhauer's run caused, and that the show's profitability up to this point (Jeopardy! and sister program Wheel of Fortune combined generate approximately $125 million in profit) would allow them to absorb the increased payouts. It was also noted that the improved ratings would not immediately allow the show to increase advertising rates, since those are set on a season-by-season basis as part of long-term ad buys.

The highest-rated episode during Holzhauer's run was his final one, which at 14.5 million same-day viewers was the highest-rated episode since Jennings' last episode in 2004, the highest-rated episode of a syndicated show that season and the third-most-watched episode of a running series in the 2018–19 season (behind only the series-ending "The Stockholm Syndrome" episode of The Big Bang Theory and an episode of 60 Minutes that had led out of an NFL on CBS contest), not counting DVR or streaming views, the latter of which Jeopardy! did not offer at the time.

The record ratings came despite the fact that the episode had been spoiled several hours before it aired on most affiliate stations. Production staff notified interested media organizations in advance that Holzhauer would lose on June 3, but asked them to agree to an embargo until the show aired. The New York Times then hired a freelance journalist based in Montgomery, Alabama, to watch the show's first airing on any station – at 9:30 a.m. Central Time (10:30 a.m. Eastern Time). Upon confirming Holzhauer had in fact lost, the paper immediately published its story on the result and a profile of Boettcher to some controversy, as the episode would not air in the rest of Central Time or anywhere in other time zones for at least several hours. Sports Illustrated credited the spoilers with creating buzz, counteracting the conventional wisdom that people would not tune in without the element of surprise. Even if the result had not been spoiled, Holzhauer was on pace to break Jennings's regular-play record that day had he won, which might have also had a part in the increased ratings.

===== Other activities =====
In February 2023, Holzhauer appeared as a Clue Giver in the category "Taking A Gamble With James Holzhauer" during the Triple Jeopardy! on the final episode of Celebrity Jeopardy! on ABC.

In January 2023, it was announced that Holzhauer would compete in the Jeopardy! Masters primetime tournament on ABC. The program premiered on May 8, 2023.

=== Gambling career ===
While a student at the University of Illinois at Urbana–Champaign, Holzhauer played hearts and spades at a card club. The twice-a-week club quickly turned into a five-day-a-week home poker game with a 10-cent ante and $2 maximum bets. The poker game is where Holzhauer began gambling but he grew his sports betting bankroll in the 2006 World Baseball Classic. Believing the round-robin format of the tournament and variance in baseball had skewed the odds, Holzhauer bet heavily on each team except the US and the Dominican Republic to win the tournament. After graduating from college, he moved to Las Vegas in 2008 to bet professionally on sports. Holzhauer says he has built predictive models for baseball, NFL, and college basketball, but now focuses largely on in-game betting.

Holzhauer debuted at the World Series of Poker in 2019. In his first event, Holzhauer finished 454th out of approximately 1,800 contestants and did not win any prize money (he would have needed to finish at 281st or higher to win any prize money). His second event was a tag-team match in which he partnered with Mike Sexton. Holzhauer ultimately was knocked out as a solo contestant in round 17 of the tournament, with his most notable prize win being a $600 profit for finishing 92nd out of 1,867 on a No-Limit Hold'em Super Turbo Bounty game.

== Personal life ==
On September 8, 2012, Holzhauer married Melissa Sassin, a tutor from Seattle, Washington. Sassin has also been a game show contestant, appearing on Who Wants to Be a Millionaire in 2014 and winning $28,800.

Holzhauer frequently made inside references to important dates in his life with his Jeopardy! wagers, including family members' birthdays, his anniversary, and the date of the 2017 Las Vegas shooting.

Holzhauer is a sports fan in his personal capacity and is a fan of the Vegas Golden Knights of the National Hockey League. He has incorporated Vegas' staple "V" logo into his signature on an episode of Jeopardy and in a separate episode once proclaimed 'go Knights go' before wagering $10,617 on a daily double question, intentionally corresponding with October 6, 2017, the date of the team's first win. On April 21, 2019, Holzhauer participated in the team's pre-game festivities before a playoff match. He is also a lifelong fan of the Chicago Cubs; he has said his dream job is a front-office position with the team and has actively sought employment in Major League Baseball. Holzhauer has said that he was contractually obligated to a non-compete clause in an agreement with the Jeopardy! producers; it expired in January 2020.

Holzhauer is a fan of professional wrestling, in particular WWE, as seen in his numerous appearances for Jeopardy and The Chase. On both of those shows, he has notably used the taunts of Randy Orton, Scott Hall, Shawn Michaels and Chris Jericho. He also used a wrestling-like championship belt when on Jeopardy! Masters, and was referred to as a "self-described game show villain". To hype up Jeopardy! The Greatest of All Time in November 2019, he made a public statement identical to Scott Steiner's famous "Maths" promo, replacing Kurt Angle with Brad Rutter, and Samoa Joe with Ken Jennings whilst stating he had a "141 2/3% chance of winning" the event.

=== Bridge ===
Holzhauer is the 2026 American Contract Bridge League Honorary Member of the Year. In the 2019 Bridge Bulletin, he declared that he was "planning to turn his attention to bridge with the goal of becoming a world-class player." The Summer North American Bridge Championships were held in Las Vegas in 2019, which was the "perfect opportunity for him to immerse in the bridge community." He has helped to use his celebrity to promote bridge and has "become an extraordinary ambassador for bridge".

=== Philanthropy ===
Holzhauer said that he intended to donate some of his Jeopardy! winnings to Las Vegas children's charities. On April 7, 2019, Holzhauer donated $10,000 to a Las Vegas organization for displaced teens. On May 2, he was awarded a key to the Las Vegas Strip for his success on Jeopardy! and for his donations to children's charity organizations and other nonprofit organizations in the Las Vegas area. In mid-2019, Holzhauer donated $1,109.14 (representing his daughter's birthday) to the 2019 Naperville Pancreatic Cancer Reach Walk in Illinois, in Alex Trebek's name. On June 24, Holzhauer began participating in World Series of Poker events in Las Vegas. He plans to donate half his winnings to the Las Vegas nonprofit Project 150, which helps homeless, displaced and disadvantaged high school students.

== Awards and honors ==
On September 29, 2022, at the first Jeopardy! Honors event, Holzhauer and his wife Melissa received the inaugural Alex Trebek Person of the Year award from Alex Trebek's widow, Jean, for their contributions to Project 150. In 2020, the rock band AVOID! sang "Song About James" in his honor. The song was featured in NASCAR Heat 5 and NASCAR Heat Ultimate Edition+.

== See also ==
- List of Jeopardy! contestants
- Strategies and skills of Jeopardy! champions
