= Jeopardy! audition process =

Process by which one auditions to appear on Jeopardy!

Jeopardy! is an American television quiz show created by Merv Griffin, in which contestants are presented with clues in the form of answers, and must phrase their responses in the form of a question. Throughout its run, the show has regularly offered auditions for potential contestants, taking place in the Los Angeles area and occasionally in other locations throughout the United States. Unlike those of many other game shows, Jeopardy!'s audition process involves passing a test of knowledge on a diversity of subjects, approximating the breadth of material encountered by contestants on the show. Since 2006, an online screener test is conducted annually.

== Eligibility requirements ==
As with all television game shows, there are rules in place for who is allowed to appear as a contestant on Jeopardy! Competitors in the regular episodes must be 18 years of age or older; contestants in the College Championship must be full-time undergraduates without any previous bachelor's degree; competitors in the Teen Tournament must be between the ages of 13 and 17 years; and, in the past, contestants in Kids Week were between the ages of 10 and 12 years.

Those ineligible to compete on Jeopardy! include candidates for political offices, employees of Sony Pictures Entertainment and its subsidiaries (including the show's production company, Sony Pictures Television), distributor CBS Media Ventures, and television stations that broadcast Jeopardy! and/or its sister show, Wheel of Fortune, as well as family members, relatives, and acquaintances of such employees. Also excluded are individuals who have appeared as contestants on a different nationally broadcast game show of any format (including dating shows, relationship shows, and reality shows), within the past year, on three such shows within the past ten years, or on any episode of Jeopardy! itself (including Super Jeopardy!) produced since the current version debuted in 1984.

== Historical practices ==
In the original version, prospective contestants could call the Jeopardy! office in New York to make a preliminary determination of eligibility and arrange an appointment to audition. Approximately 10 to 30 individuals would audition at the Jeopardy! office at once, the process lasting about an hour and a half, and usually involving a written test, a briefing, and a mock game. Contestants invited to play on the show were generally invited within six weeks of auditioning.

When the current version of Jeopardy! premiered in 1984, prospective contestants were given a 50-question written test, with 35 being a passing score. The original contestant tests were written by head writer Jules Minton, and were later written by the show's writers. Initially, 2 new contestant tests were compiled each year, and were given alternately; later, the tests were refreshed every six months to accommodate frequent repeat test takers. The makeup of the test was 15 academic questions, 10 lifestyle, 15 pop culture and 10 wordplay. Beginning in 1987, the number of pop culture questions was reduced to 5 and wordplay to 2. Those who passed the test at an audition were invited to play a mock game to evaluate their stage presence and colorfulness. Initially, all auditions took place in Southern California, and anyone could call to make an appointment to take the test; travelling contestant searches did not begin until after the second season of the show. Local affiliates airing the show sponsored regional contestant searches, paying for the travel expenses and accommodations of the contestant coordinators. Invitations to audition were awarded by postcard drawings and other types of contests.

A 10-question pre-test was first devised when contestant coordinators conducted a two-week East Coast search at Merv Griffin's Resorts Atlantic City hotel and casino. In order to test as many people as possible, hopefuls were invited to take the screener pre-test as often as once per day, and those with a passing score of 7 were invited to return to take the 50-question full test. The 2-week Atlantic City auditions were held annually in February while the show was owned by Griffin, and the 10-question screener is still in use at traveling open auditions.

== Internet screenings ==
Periodically a series of screenings for potential contestants are conducted on the Internet through the official Jeopardy! website.

During the online testing, a 50-question qualifying exam is administered to pre-registered applicants, who have 15 seconds to answer each question, and whatever has been typed into the answer bar at the end of 15 seconds is entered as the answer. Unlike on the show, test takers are instructed not to respond in the form of a question. Test takers do not receive their score.

A random selection of passers (generally understood to be those who get 35 or more questions correct) of this exam are later invited to participate in regional in-person auditions.

== In-person audition process (regular play games) ==
Tryouts for regular play games are administered to groups of people at scheduled dates and times.

The first phase of the group audition process is divided into three parts.

1. A contestant coordinator gives an introductory talk reviewing the rules and particularities of the game and providing some guidelines regarding energy, volume, and timing for the applicants.
2. Fifty Jeopardy!-style clues in fifty different categories are displayed on the screen at the front of the room and read aloud, typically live in person by Sarah Whitcomb Foss or Jimmy McGuire, the members of the show's former Clue Crew (previously, Johnny Gilbert, the show's announcer, recorded the clues and they were played as recordings).
3. The contestant coordinators take the completed response sheets and grade them. Though some sources state that a score of 35 (70%) is passing, the contestant coordinators refuse to confirm or deny any passing score number.

This is followed by a mock Jeopardy! competition. A game board is presented, and potential contestants are placed in groups of three to play the game. The emphasis is not on scoring points, or even having correct responses (though phrasing in the form of a question is required here, like the show); the contestant coordinators know that they possess the knowledge to compete on the show, as they have already passed the test, and are looking for on-the-air-compatible qualities. Prospective contestants are encouraged to display energy and use a loud, confident voice. After playing a few clues, the contestant coordinators give each potential contestant a few minutes to talk about themselves. The coordinators request that they finish by telling what they would do with any money they won on Jeopardy!

After the end of the tryout, all prospective contestants who have taken the online test and the in-person test are placed into the pool and are eligible to be called to compete for the next eighteen months.

== Jeopardy! Brain Bus ==
The Jeopardy! Brain Bus

For Season 15 (1998–99), the show introduced a Winnebago recreational vehicle called the "Jeopardy! Brain Bus", measuring 32 feet (9.8 m), which travels 12 times per year to conduct regional contestant searches throughout the United States and Canada. Those who impress the Brain Bus staff during the Brain Bus events and have passed the qualifying tests are invited to attend actual Jeopardy! auditions in California. The official Jeopardy! website used to feature a section devoted to the Brain Bus starting during Season 21 (2004–05); by Season 26 (2009–10), this section was taken down.

During the main events of the Brain Bus searches, known as "Pre-Test" events, attendees are given a 10-question version of the qualifying test; the number of attendees at this event may not exceed 1,000. Attendees who pass the test are invited back to attempt the full 50-question qualifier the next day. People who have passed the 50-question test move on to a final interview, during which show producers determine whether the contestant is someone by whom the TV audiences would be impressed. In addition to the "Pre-Test" events conducted there, Brain Bus searches also feature an event where individuals not wishing to compete for a chance to appear on Jeopardy! can play a "mock version" of the quiz show's game hosted by one or more members of the "Clue Crew", the program's team of roving correspondents; instead of cash, the attendees of this event play for various prizes, such as T-shirts, hats, mugs, water bottles, pens, and other merchandise related to the show. During the "mock Jeopardy!" events, the hosting Clue Crew members will occasionally interact with fans in attendance.

== Episodes featuring children as contestants (1999-2014) ==
Now no longer airing, tryouts for Kids Week, Holiday Kids Week, and Back to School Week were slightly different in that the mock Jeopardy! game is played before the thirty-question test is given. During the mock game, coordinators sometimes opened up triple stumper questions to the other potential contestants. Potential contestants were called or notified by the station on which Jeopardy! airs in that particular market. Fifteen children who were between ten and twelve years old were chosen for each filming, along with one alternate.

== Waiting period ==
The mandatory waiting period after taking the online contestant exam is one year, although this may be adjusted by the show's production team based on the test schedule. Prospective contestants who have completed an in-person test and interview remain in the contestant pool for 18 months, only after the expiration of which may they take the online test again and attend another in-person audition.

== Auditions in the Art Fleming era ==
Tryouts for the original version were conducted somewhat differently. In a classroom-type arrangement, potential contestants wrote their questions to the answers held up by the contestant coordinator, who used cards which had previously actually been used on the show. While the exams were being scored, the staff explained that on any given day, the contestants who actually appear all scored the same number (or very nearly the same number) on this tryout. For the next day, the staff would select two new contestants who had scored a point or two higher than the winner that day, and so on day after day. This typically resulted in a pattern in which almost no contestant was able to win five days in a row (because she or he was subsequently competing with contestants who were probably better) – until the scores escalated to the point at which all three contestants had scored at or near the maximum possible score.

Potential contestants were told that if their score was not in the range that they were seeking that particular day, their names and information would be put into a contestant pool, and that — if they lived near New York — they might be called to come to the studio at any time in the next several months when their "number" came up (although it was made clear that this was unlikely due to the large number of contestants who had tried out).
