= Amy Schneider =

American writer and game show contestant

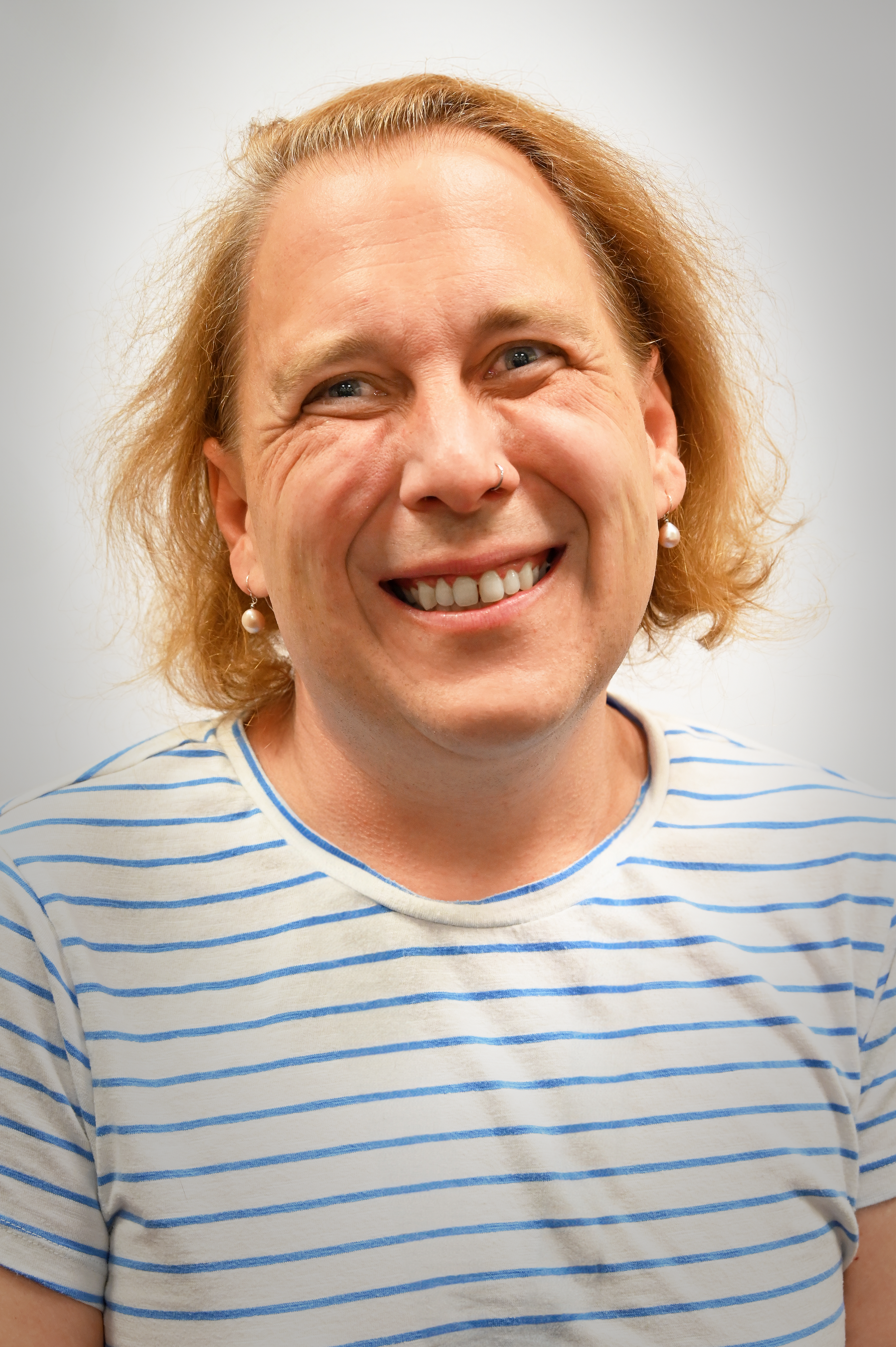
- Schneider in 2024
- Born: May 29, 1979 (age 47); Dayton, Ohio, U.S.
- Education: University of Dayton (BS)
- Occupation: Writer
- Known for: 40-game winning streak on Jeopardy!
- Spouse: Kelly Anneken (m. 2004; div. 2016) Genevieve Davis (m. 2022)

Amy Schneider (born May 29, 1979) is an American writer and game show contestant. Winning 40 consecutive games on the quiz show Jeopardy! from November 2021 to January 2022 and the November 2022 Tournament of Champions, she holds the second-longest win streak in the program's history, behind only Ken Jennings (74 games), who hosted the show as she competed. Schneider has the fourth-highest winnings in regular-season play. Her streak is the longest win streak by a woman. She is the most successful woman and most successful transgender contestant ever to compete on the show, in terms of both the length of her streak and her $1.6 million in winnings.

Schneider is known for her skill in the Final Jeopardy! round, having responded correctly 30 out of 41 times in her run. She lives in Oakland, California. Across all American game shows, Schneider is the tenth-highest-earning contestant of all time.

== Early life ==
Amy Schneider was born May 29, 1979, to Betty Jo Schneider and grew up in Dayton, Ohio and attended Chaminade-Julienne High School. When she was in the eighth grade, Schneider was voted "Most likely to appear on Jeopardy!" by her classmates. Schneider graduated from the University of Dayton with a degree in computer science.

== Career ==
=== Jeopardy! streak ===
Schneider's first victory occurred on the November 17, 2021, episode, dethroning five-day champion Andrew He. In the following 14 games, she missed only one Final Jeopardy! question. Schneider missed a second in her 16th win. In total, she has won over $1 million on Jeopardy!, the fifth-highest amount of total winnings of any contestant on the show. Schneider is the first openly transgender contestant to qualify for the Tournament of Champions. Her winning streak came one year after Kate Freeman became the first openly transgender contestant to win on the show. Schneider, who viewed Freeman's victory and several other trans contestants' losing appearances on the show as inspiration, has described the significance of having a trans identity: "The fact is, I don't actually think about being trans all that often, and so when appearing on national television, I wanted to represent that part of my identity accurately: as important, but also relatively minor." Throughout her run on Jeopardy!, Schneider expressed admiration for past champions Ken Jennings, James Holzhauer, Matt Amodio, and Julia Collins, the first woman to win 20 games in a row (Jeopardy!'s second-longest streak at the time). On a January 2022 episode of Watch What Happens Live with Andy Cohen, Schneider said that she hoped Jennings would become the permanent host of the program, citing his comforting and empathetic presence. After surpassing Amodio's 38-game winning streak in the January 24, 2022, episode, Schneider took second place for the most consecutive wins in Jeopardy! history at 39, behind only Jennings' 74 consecutive wins.

==== End of streak ====
Schneider was defeated in her 41st episode, aired on January 26, 2022, finishing second behind Rhone Talsma, a librarian from Chicago, Illinois. The Final Jeopardy! clue was, "The only nation in the world whose name in English ends in an H, it's also one of the 10 most populous." Talsma responded, "What is Bangladesh?", which was correct, putting him ahead of Schneider, who had no response. Her winnings totaled over $1,300,000, ranking Schneider fourth in most money won in regular-season play behind Jennings, Holzhauer, and Amodio.

==== Tournament of Champions ====
Schneider appeared in the Jeopardy! Tournament of Champions that aired in November 2022. On November 21, she won the tournament along with its $250,000 grand prize. Schneider was the first openly transgender person to compete in, and to win, the Jeopardy! Tournament of Champions.

==== Jeopardy! Masters ====
In January 2023, ABC announced a new primetime Jeopardy! spinoff, Jeopardy! Masters, which brought back Schneider along with Amodio, Holzhauer, Sam Buttrey, Andrew He, and Mattea Roach in a Champions League-style event. Schneider finished the quarter final round of Jeopardy! Masters in fifth place, and was eliminated from the competition.

==== Strategy ====
Schneider has explained that when she sees a category where she is weak, she gets it "out of the way first. That way, if there were any doubles in that category, they would come up when there wasn't as much money to be wagered." Later, Schneider described her wagering strategy in a runaway game with little competition: "round up the second place score to the nearest thousand, double it, subtract it from my score, and then subtract another thousand in case I'd messed something up. Schneider said that doing crossword puzzles helps her think of words "as both a concept and a collection of letters at the same time".

==== Regular play winnings ====
Game no.	Air date	Final score	Cumulative winnings	Notes
1	November 17	$31,600*	$31,600	
2	November 18	$33,800	$65,400	
3	November 19	$44,800	$110,200	
4	November 22	$45,400	$155,600	
5	November 23	$14,800	$170,400	First game in which she failed to give a correct response in Final Jeopardy! round.
6	November 24	$37,400	$207,800	
7	November 25	$50,000	$257,800	
8	November 26	$37,400	$295,200	
9	November 29	$47,000	$342,200	
10	November 30	$38,000*	$380,200	
11	December 1	$41,000	$421,200	
12	December 2	$61,800	$483,000	
13	December 3	$53,400	$536,400	
14	December 20	$34,800*	$571,200	Regular season play resumed after the 2021 Professors Tournament.
15	December 21	$35,000	$606,200	
16	December 22	$25,200	$631,400	Second game in which she failed to give a correct response in Final Jeopardy! round.
17	December 23	$56,000	$687,400	
18	December 24	$19,400	$706,800	Third game in which she failed to give a correct response in Final Jeopardy! round.
19	December 27	$38,400	$745,200	
20	December 28	$23,400	$768,600	
21	December 29	$37,400	$806,000	Set a record for longest win streak by a female player
22	December 30	$25,600*	$831,600	
23	December 31	$24,000	$855,600	Fourth game in which she failed to give a correct response in Final Jeopardy! round.
24	January 3	$42,000	$897,600	
25	January 4	$20,400	$918,000	Fifth game in which she failed to give a correct response in Final Jeopardy! round.
26	January 5	$32,000	$950,000	
27	January 6	$27,400*	$977,400	
28	January 7	$42,200	$1,019,600	Became fourth Jeopardy! contestant to win $1 million in regular gameplay winnings
29	January 10	$15,800	$1,035,400	Sixth game in which she failed to give a correct response in Final Jeopardy! round.
30	January 11	$22,400	$1,057,800	Seventh game in which she failed to give a correct response in Final Jeopardy! round.
31	January 12	$11,000	$1,068,800	Eighth game in which she failed to give a correct response in Final Jeopardy! round.
32	January 13	$32,800	$1,101,600	
33	January 14	$10,200	$1,111,800	Ninth game in which she failed to give a correct response in Final Jeopardy! round, lowest single day total.
34	January 17	$36,800	$1,148,600	
35	January 18	$15,400	$1,164,000	Tenth game in which she failed to give a correct response in Final Jeopardy! round.
36	January 19	$17,800	$1,181,800	Eleventh game in which she failed to give a correct response in Final Jeopardy! round.
37	January 20	$71,400	$1,253,200	
38	January 21	$54,000	$1,307,200	
39	January 24	$12,600	$1,319,800	Twelfth game in which she failed to give a correct response in Final Jeopardy! round. Passed Matt Amodio for second-longest winning streak in regular play, behind Ken Jennings.
40	January 25	$63,000	$1,382,800	
41	January 26	$19,600‡	$1,384,800	Defeated by challenger Rhone Talsma, who finished the game with $29,600. At the end of the first round, Schneider had $7,200; Talsma had $3,400; and challenger Janice Hawthorne Timm had $2,000. At the end of Double Jeopardy!, Schneider was in the lead with $27,600; Talsma was in second place with $17,600; and Hawthorne Timm was in third with $3,200. Schneider gave the wrong answer and finished second. She was awarded $2,000. This was the 13th game in which she failed to give a correct response in the Final Jeopardy! round.
* Yellow background denotes game which was not a runaway (lead going into Final Jeopardy! round could not guarantee a win).
‡ Red background denotes game in which Schneider is defeated.

=== Other appearances ===
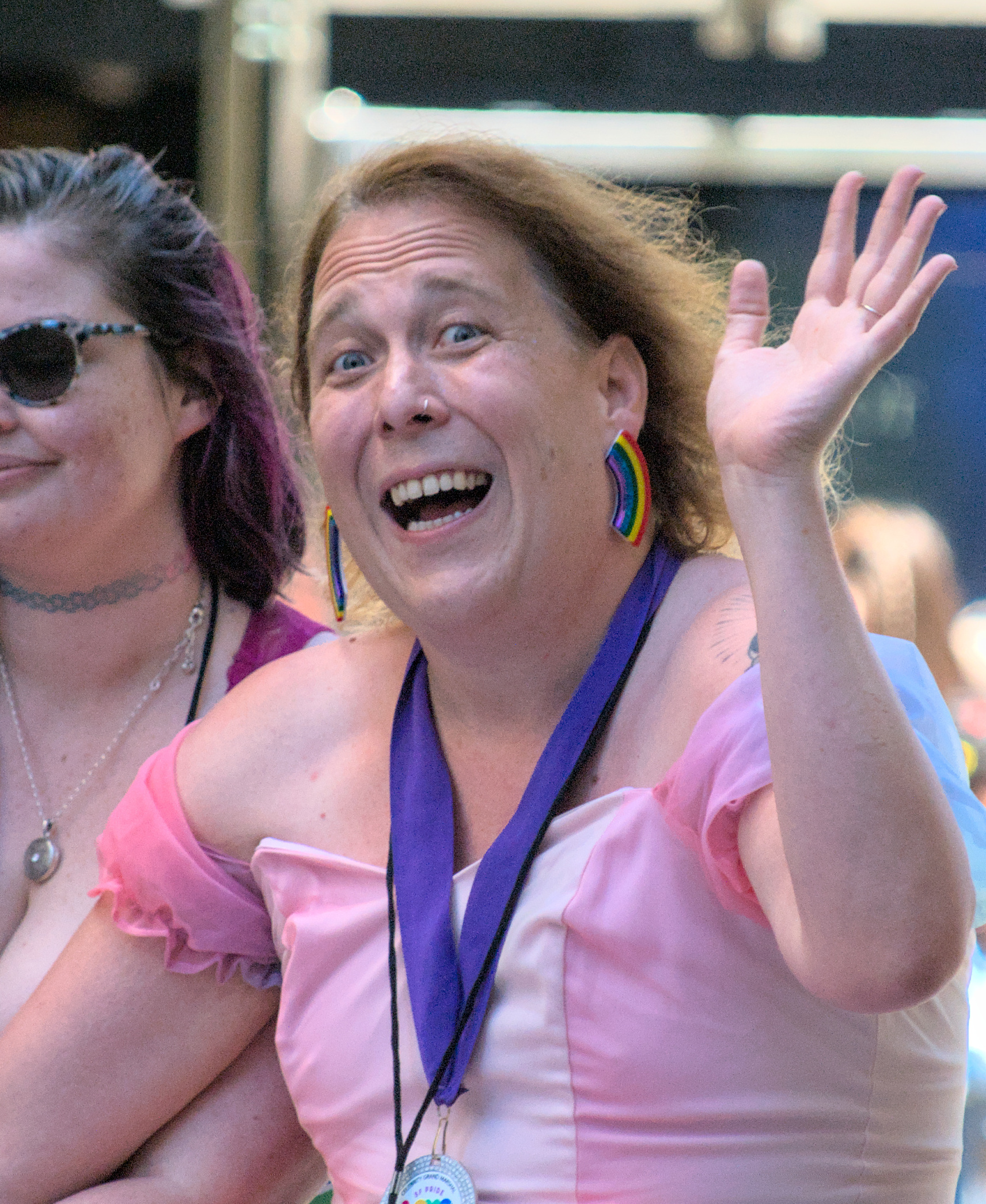
Schneider in 2022

From January 2012 to January 2021, before her run on Jeopardy!, Schneider hosted a podcast with her former wife Kelly Anneken called Up Yours, Downstairs! based on the television series Downton Abbey.

In December 2022, it was announced that Schneider was developing a podcast entitled Amy Always Wins hosted by actor Rob Corddry for SmartLess Media.

In September 2023, Schneider published her first book, a series of personal essays entitled In the Form of a Question: The Joys and Rewards of a Curious Life for Simon & Schuster.

In April 2025, Schneider appeared on Top Chef alongside Jeopardy! champion Mattea Roach and actor Michael Cera (who competed on Celebrity Jeopardy! in January 2023).

== Personal life ==
Schneider at the Ohio Statehouse in 2022

Schneider is a trans woman. She transitioned in 2017. Schneider was married to Kelly Anneken (who would later compete on Jeopardy! at the start of Season 42 in September 2025) from 2004 until their divorce in 2016. On May 9, 2022, she married her partner, Genevieve Davis, after a three-month engagement.

Schneider has a cat named Meep, a name given to her at the shelter before adoption, "because the only noise she would make was 'meep'. Me and my girlfriend said we would find another name for her, but she kept making that noise, and we realized it was the right name."

In November 2022, Schneider testified at an Ohio House of Representatives committee meeting against the "Save Adolescents From Experimentation (SAFE) Act" bill, which would restrict doctors' ability to provide puberty blockers, hormone replacement therapy, and gender-affirming surgery to minors.

== Bibliography ==
- Amy Schneider (October 3, 2023). In the Form of a Question: The Joys and Rewards of a Curious Life. Simon & Schuster. ISBN 9781668013304.

== Accolades ==
On January 19, 2022, Schneider was awarded a GLAAD Special Recognition honor for her Jeopardy! performance.

== See also ==
- List of Jeopardy! contestants
- Strategies and skills of Jeopardy! champions
