= Sam Buttrey =

American academic (born 1961)

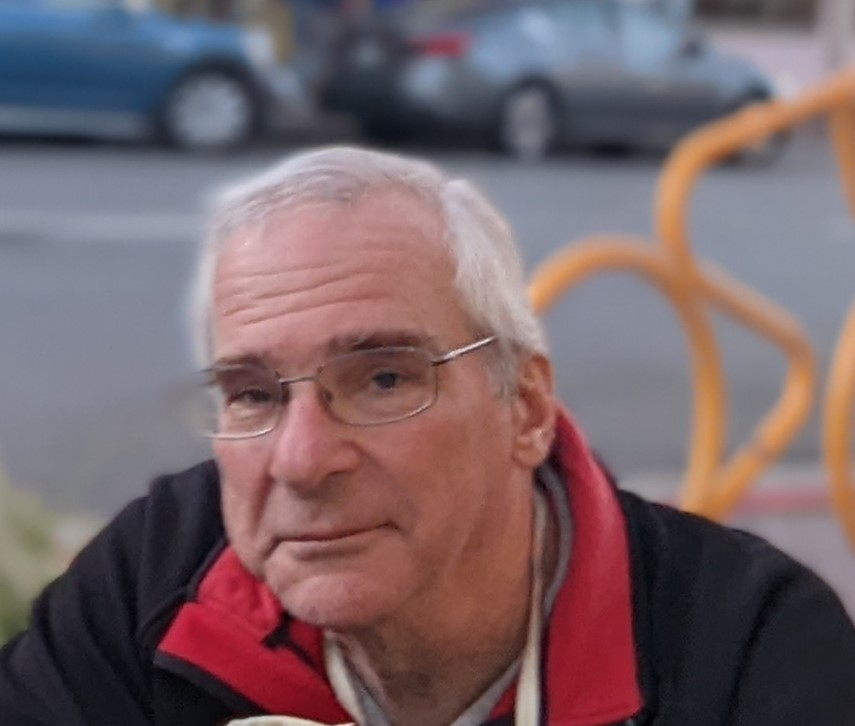
- Born: Samuel Edward Buttrey; August 19, 1961 (age 65); Rome, Italy
- Education: Phillips Exeter Academy Princeton University (AB) University of California, Berkeley (PhD)
- Occupations: Professor; podcaster
- Known for: Multiple appearances on Jeopardy! (2021–2024)
- Spouse: Elinda Hardy (m. 1994)
- Children: 1

Samuel Edward Buttrey (born August 19, 1961) is a podcaster, and retired Associate Professor of Operations Research at the U.S. Naval Postgraduate School in Monterey, California. He is best known for multiple appearances on the game show Jeopardy!.

== Early life ==
Buttrey was born in Rome, Italy, on August 19, 1961, the son of Theodore V. Buttrey, Jr. and Marisa (Macina) Buttrey. He was educated at The Perse School in Cambridge, U.K., graduated from the Phillips Exeter Academy in 1979, and was awarded a Bachelor of Arts degree from Princeton University in 1983. He thereafter obtained his Ph.D. in Statistics from the University of California, Berkeley in 1996.

== Career ==
Buttrey has about two dozen journal articles and over a hundred masters theses advised. He has also published a book, A Data Scientist's Guide to Acquiring, Cleaning, and Managing Data in R. In 2004, Buttrey was awarded the Rear Admiral John Jay Schieffelin Award for Excellence in Teaching at the Naval Postgraduate School.

=== Jeopardy! ===
Buttrey’s initial appearance on Jeopardy! was during its inaugural Professor's Tournament in December 2021, having been an avid fan of the show since he was 7, when he watched at his grandmother's house when Art Fleming was the host. Buttrey won his initial game, won again in the semi-finals, and prevailed in a two-game final. His win earned him an automatic spot in the 2022 Tournament of Champions, where he lost to Amy Schneider in the finals. Buttrey obtained a degree of social media renown for his physical resemblance to the actor Steve Martin, as well as his jovial manner and quick-wittedness. His wife, Elinda, also tried out for the show multiple times and was planning to compete on the show in Season 41 before he accepted the offer to be a co-host for the show's Inside Jeopardy! podcast.

He donated a little more than half the winnings from his first appearance, when he won $100,000 as champion of the Professors Tournament, to the CSU Monterey Bay Buttrey-Hardy endowed scholarship fund.

Buttrey was invited back to Jeopardy to compete in the Jeopardy! Masters competition in May 2023. He finished sixth among the six players. He won $50,000.

Buttrey's final Jeopardy! appearance came in the show's inaugural Invitational Tournament, which aired from March 20 to April 9, 2024. He won his quarterfinal match against Colby Burnett and Lilly Chin, but lost in the semifinals to eventual champion Victoria Groce. In September 2024, it was announced that Buttrey had been made a co-host of the show's "Inside Jeopardy!" podcast, as a result of which he had retired from competition. His job as "Sambassador" includes appearances at Jeopardy!-themed events, like the Jeopardy! event at quiz website Sporcle's SporcleCon 2024 event in Detroit.

== Personal life ==
Buttrey has been married to Elinda Hardy since July 2, 1994. He has one child.
