= Matt Amodio =

American game show contestant (born 1990)

- Born: Matthew Benjamin Amodio; December 4, 1990 (age 35); Medina, Ohio, U.S.
- Education: Ohio State University (BS, MS); University of Wisconsin–Madison (MS); Yale University (PhD)
- Known for: 38-game Jeopardy! winning streak

Matthew Benjamin Amodio (born December 4, 1990) is an American game show contestant, computer scientist and mathematician who held a 38-game winning streak on the game show Jeopardy!.

Amodio won $1,518,601 in 39 appearances on Jeopardy!, making him the third millionaire contestant on the show in regular-season play. Across all American game shows, Amodio is the 8th-highest-earning contestant of all time. His run on the show has been called the "Amodio Rodeo".

== Early life and education ==
Amodio is a native of Medina County, Ohio. He has three older brothers. His mother, Bonnie (née Solowitch) is an English professor. His father, James, is an attorney. Amodio has Italian ancestry on his father's side of the family and Ashkenazi Jewish ancestry on his mother's side of the family.

Amodio attended Medina High School where he graduated as valedictorian of the class of 2009; he was also a National Merit Scholar. Amodio graduated from Ohio State University in 2012 with a Bachelor of Science with Honors in actuarial science from the Department of Mathematics, while also earning a master's degree in statistics.

Amodio subsequently earned a Master's of Science (MS) degree in artificial intelligence from the University of Wisconsin–Madison in 2017 and, during his Jeopardy! appearances, was studying computer science at Yale University from which he graduated with a PhD in the spring of 2022.

== Game show appearances ==
=== Academic Challenge ===
Amodio was a contestant on the quiz show Academic Challenge on WEWS in Cleveland, Ohio, while studying at Medina High School in 2009. Participating with two fellow students against two competing high schools, his Medina team finished in second place.

=== Jeopardy! ===
Amodio is the third-highest earner of all time in regular-season play, third-most successful in consecutive games won and fourth-biggest all-time winner. Amodio averaged $39,963 per victory, second highest all-time to James Holzhauer at $76,944. During season 39, Amodio qualified as the second seed in the next Tournament of Champions. He responded to 1,299 clues—54.6% of all of the clues given—correctly over the course of his run. At the time of his Jeopardy! appearance, he was a PhD student in computer science at Yale University.

Actor Jonathan Fisher, originally from Coral Gables, Florida, who would himself amass an 11-game winning streak, defeated Amodio in his 39th and final game. The episode originally aired October 11, 2021. Both appeared in the Jeopardy! Tournament of Champions that aired in November 2022 but did not play each other. Amodio lost to Sam Buttrey. In May 2023, Amodio and Buttrey (who was the Professors Tournament champion in Season 38) were invited to the Jeopardy! Masters tournament. Buttrey was eliminated in the first round, while Amodio was a finalist and finished third behind James Holzhauer and Mattea Roach. Amodio and Amy Schneider were relegated in the 2024 Jeopardy! Masters tournament, sending both into the 2025 Jeopardy! Invitational Tournament in February, which Amodio won to earn a slot in the 2025 version of Jeopardy! Masters.

==== Production ====
After taking the online test twice, Amodio was invited to personally audition for the show. In addition to the test results, the producers consider the personality of the prospective contestant; as an introvert, Amodio was concerned that he would not be interesting enough for the show.

Amodio's winning streak came during an interregnum in the show's hosting position after longtime host Alex Trebek died in November 2020, during which the show was helmed by guest hosts. Amodio's streak spanned episodes hosted by Robin Roberts, LeVar Burton, David Faber, and Joe Buck. Mike Richards was named permanent host on August 11, 2021, but lasted only one taping day (first week of season 38); he was replaced by interim host Mayim Bialik (who rotated the rest of season 38 with Ken Jennings, but Amodio's reign ended before Jennings' official term as host, as Jennings was the first host of the interregnum). As Jeopardy! tapes five episodes per production day, Amodio recorded his 39 episodes on nine separate days (three on his first day, one on his final day).

Amodio played with his seventh different host during the Tournament of Champions, which featured Jennings as host, and won a Jennings-hosted game in the Masters tournament, where he defeated Andrew He (Season 39 Tournament of Champions finalist) and James Holzhauer (Season 36 Tournament of Champions winner) in his second game, becoming only the third contestant in Jeopardy! history to defeat Holzhauer (Emma Boettcher, in Game 33; current host Ken Jennings, thrice in the two-legged tie of The Greatest of All Time).

==== Strategy ====
Amodio is noted for his strategy of consistently prefacing his responses with "What's" instead of adjusting the interrogative pronoun to fit the response. Amodio chose this method because Jeopardy! rules allow any question containing the correct response to be used; by not having to adjust the pronoun, he has one less thing to think about when formulating a response, potentially speeding response time. Amodio has credited Wikipedia's wikilinks format for allowing him to meander through various topics in a random but logical progression and learn content quickly.

==== Regular play winnings 2021 ====
Game no.	Air date	Host	Final score	Cumulative winnings	Notes
1	July 21	Robin Roberts	$40,400*	$40,400	
2	July 22	Robin Roberts	$41,000	$81,400	
3	July 23	Robin Roberts	$20,000	$101,400	First game in which he failed to give a correct response in Final Jeopardy! round.
4	July 26	LeVar Burton	$21,000*	$122,400	Contestant Patrick Pearce scored the lowest ever (non-adjusted) score of -$7,400.
5	July 27	LeVar Burton	$25,400*	$147,800	
6	July 28	LeVar Burton	$47,000	$194,800	
7	July 29	LeVar Burton	$74,000	$268,800	
8	July 30	LeVar Burton	$22,400	$291,200	Second game in which he failed to give a correct response in Final Jeopardy! round.
9	August 2	David Faber	$19,200	$310,400	Third game in which Amodio failed to give a correct response in Final Jeopardy! round.
10	August 3	David Faber	$52,000	$362,400	
11	August 4	David Faber	$6,200	$368,600	Fourth game in which he failed to give a correct response in Final Jeopardy! round. Broke record for most winnings lost on Final Jeopardy! in regular play ($37,000). His lowest winning single day total.
12	August 5	David Faber	$26,000	$394,600	His lowest single day total runaway game with a correct Final Jeopardy! response.
13	August 6	David Faber	$35,600	$430,200	
14	August 9	Joe Buck	$10,400	$440,600	Fifth game in which Amodio failed to give a correct response in Final Jeopardy! round. Amodio crossed out the correct response in Final.
15	August 10	Joe Buck	$35,000	$475,600	
16	August 11	Joe Buck	$29,600	$505,200	Sixth game in which he failed to give a correct response in Final Jeopardy! round. Crossed out the correct response in Final.
17	August 12	Joe Buck	$42,400*	$547,600	Reached third-place on all-time Jeopardy! regular play winnings list
18	August 13	Joe Buck	$27,201*	$574,801	Season 37 finale of Jeopardy!. Amodio was in a "lock-tie" situation headed to Final Jeopardy!, which since season 31 rule change meant he had to wager as least $1 to prevent a tie-breaker, win or lose. Amodio's run went on a month-long hiatus following the end of the season.
19	September 13	Mike Richards	$67,800	$642,601	Season 38 premiere of Jeopardy!. Mike Richards had been named permanent host days before taping, but left after this taping day.
20	September 14	Mike Richards	$36,200	$678,801	
21	September 15	Mike Richards	$61,200	$740,001	Passed Julia Collins for third-longest winning streak in regular play.
22	September 16	Mike Richards	$35,400	$775,401	
23	September 17	Mike Richards	$50,400	$825,801	
24	September 20	Mayim Bialik	$31,200*	$857,001	Seventh game in which Amodio failed to give a correct response in Final Jeopardy! round. The only game in which a contestant (Tracy Pitzel) had an opportunity to end Amodio's streak by correctly answering Final Jeopardy!, which she failed to do.
25	September 21	Mayim Bialik	$36,200	$893,201	
26	September 22	Mayim Bialik	$36,200	$929,401	
27	September 23	Mayim Bialik	$25,800	$955,201	Eighth game in which he failed to give a correct response in Final Jeopardy! round. Crossed out the correct response in Final.
28	September 24	Mayim Bialik	$48,800	$1,004,001	Became third Jeopardy! contestant to win $1 million in regular gameplay winnings
29	September 27	Mayim Bialik	$33,000	$1,037,001	
30	September 28	Mayim Bialik	$70,400	$1,107,401	
31	September 29	Mayim Bialik	$50,600	$1,158,001	
32	September 30	Mayim Bialik	$54,400	$1,212,401	
33	October 1	Mayim Bialik	$55,400	$1,267,801	Moved into #10 on American game show winnings list. Passed James Holzhauer for second-longest winning streak in regular play.
34	October 4	Mayim Bialik	$83,000	$1,350,801	Highest single game score ever achieved by a contestant other than Holzhauer. 13th highest overall.
35	October 5	Mayim Bialik	$50,000	$1,400,801	
36	October 6	Mayim Bialik	$16,600	$1,417,401	Ninth game in which he failed to give a correct response in Final Jeopardy! round.
37	October 7	Mayim Bialik	$50,400	$1,467,801	
38	October 8	Mayim Bialik	$50,800	$1,518,601	Last episode with Mike Richards as executive producer.
39	October 11	Mayim Bialik	$5,600‡	$1,519,601	Defeated by challenger Jonathan Fisher, who finished the game with $29,200. At the end of the first round, Amodio had $9,800; Fisher had $4,000; and challenger Jessica Stephens had $2,400. At the end of Double Jeopardy!, Fisher was in the lead with $14,600; Stephens was in second place with $14,400; and Amodio was in third with $10,600. This was the first time that Amodio trailed going into Final Jeopardy! round. Amodio gave the wrong response and finished third. He was awarded $1,000. This was the 10th game in which he failed to give a correct response in the Final Jeopardy! round. First episode with Michael Davies as executive producer.
* Yellow background denotes game which was not a runaway (lead going into Final Jeopardy! round could not guarantee a win).
‡ Red background denotes game in which Amodio is defeated.

== See also ==
- List of notable Jeopardy! contestants
- Strategies and skills of Jeopardy! champions
