= List of Jeopardy! tournaments and events =

American television quiz show

Jeopardy! is an American television quiz show created by Merv Griffin, in which contestants are presented with clues in the form of answers and must phrase their responses in the form of questions. Over the years, the show has featured many tournaments and special events.

== Regular tournaments and events ==
=== Tournament of Champions ===
Jeopardy! has conducted a regular tournament called the "Tournament of Champions", featuring the most successful champions and other big winners who have appeared on the show since the last tournament. It was held every year during Art Fleming's hosting run and has been held roughly once a year, with some exceptions, since 1984.

The current series' Tournament of Champions originally lasted two weeks over ten episodes in a format devised by then-host and producer Alex Trebek in 1985. The field consists of fifteen former champions, with automatic bids given to winners of any College Championships or Teachers Tournaments held since the previous Tournament of Champions. Since the 2004 tournament, the rest of the field has been set depending on how many games a champion was able to win during their reign, with a contestant needing to win at least three wins to be considered (up to shows taped on October 29, 2020, the last tape day with Alex Trebek hosting; Sony ended the Tournament of Champions cycle after Trebek's death ten days later)—later changed to four wins (effective with the new cycle that began with shows taped November 30, 2020, when production resumed with Ken Jennings as the first interim host). Total winnings are also used if there are multiple champions with the same number of victories. The qualifying rules were changed after the show allowed contestants to continue playing until they were defeated during the twentieth season; prior to that, any champion who won a total of five games retired undefeated and automatically earned a slot in the Tournament of Champions.

The first week consisted of five quarterfinal matches featuring three different champions each day. The winners of those five games, plus the four highest-scoring non-winners in the tournament (known as wild cards), advanced to the semifinals, where the three winners of the three semifinal matches advance to the finals and compete for the championship in a two-game final match. Each game in this match is scored separately from the other; if a finalist ends the Double Jeopardy! round with zero or a negative total, they will be eliminated from Final Jeopardy! and their score for that day is recorded as zero. The combined totals from both games are used to determine the overall standings.

The top prize for the Tournament of Champions on the current series was initially $100,000. Beginning with the 2003 Tournament of Champions, which was the first held after the clue values were doubled in 2001, the prize was increased to $250,000. After the initial tournament, where they were guaranteed to receive their cumulative total in cash, each runner-up has been guaranteed a minimum dollar amount depending on their placing. The current figures were established in 2025, $75,000 apiece for second and third place. For 2006-2024, the prizes were a minimum of $100,000 for second place and $50,000 for third. If the scores exceeded the minimum guarantees, they were awarded the higher score until 2024. Players eliminated before the finals win a fixed award of $5,000 for quarterfinalists or $10,000 for semifinalists.

On the Fleming-era tournaments, all players kept their scores in cash at the end of each game, and in addition to their game winnings, the Grand Champions also won a tropical vacation and were presented with a trophy called the Griffin Award, named for Merv Griffin.

The Season 37 tournament, which was when the show used various interim hosts, following the death of Alex Trebek, was hosted by Buzzy Cohen, who won the Season 34 tournament.

The Season 39 tournament featured a new format which provided an expanded field of 21 contestants. Three contestants who won 20+ games—Matt Amodio, Amy Schneider, and Mattea Roach—automatically qualified for the semifinal rounds as the top three seeds, while the remaining 18 contestants played six quarterfinal games. The six winners advanced to the semifinals and joined the top three seeds; there were no wild cards. To prevent preemption by Election Day coverage in some markets, the November 8, 2022 episode was a "warm-up" exhibition game for Amodio, Schneider, and Roach, with no prize money at stake. The winners of the semifinal matches advanced to the finals, which consisted of a minimum of three and a maximum of seven games, similar to the Greatest of All Time tournament (see below). The first finalist to win three games won the tournament and the $250,000 top prize. The second-place and third-place prizes were determined first by number of wins, then by number of second-place finishes, and finally by total score across all games played, and won $100,000 and $50,000, respectively. Furthermore, all three finalists received entry into the Jeopardy! Masters tournament.

The format was changed again in Season 40, affected by the Hollywood labor disputes, causing additional tournaments to be held in order to allow episodes to be filmed, now featuring an even more expanded field of 27 contestants who played in nine quarterfinal games. The nine winners of the quarterfinal games proceed to the semifinals, and the three winners of those games proceed to the finals. The format of the finals is retained from the Season 39 tournament, with the winner earning an entry into the Jeopardy! Masters tournament. Beginning with Season 41, the prizes for the non-winning finalists were adjusted to $75,000, along with an invitation to the Jeopardy! Masters tournament.

In order to accommodate the revert of the Season 39 format for Season 41's tournament, a similar exhibition game, which featured Adriana Harmeyer, Isaac Hirsch and Drew Basile, who were automatically qualified to the semifinals as the top three seeds, was broadcast in audio-only on Tunein on January 24, 2025, as part of its continued partnership between Tunein and Sony Pictures. It would later be aired on February 14, the day after the tournament concluded.

The Season 42 tournament featured a reduced field of 21 contestants, with the top three seeds Scott Riccardi, Laura Faddah, and Paolo Pasco automatically qualified to the semifinals, with their exhibition game aired on January 30, 2026, the day after the semifinals concluded. The six winners of the quarterfinal games proceed to the semifinals, and the winners of those semifinal games proceed to the best-three-of-seven finals.

=== JeoparDAY! ===
Starting from Season 38, a special day took place annually on March 30, the same date Jeopardy! originally premiered. The Season 38 JeoparDAY! event featured the first episode of the original NBC version of Jeopardy!. The Season 39 JeoparDAY! featured the first episode of the syndicated version of Jeopardy!, which was Alex Trebek's first episode. The Season 40 JeoparDAY! event celebrated the show's 60th anniversary, which allowed the first 10,000 people who took the Jeopardy! Anytime Test to donate $6, which totaled $60,000. For the season 42 JeoparDAY! event, people who took the special Jeopardy! Giveaway Test between March 30 and April 6 are automatically entered for a chance to win $6,200.

=== Jeopardy! Honors ===
Starting from Season 39, an annual awards ceremony event takes place during taping of Tournament of Champions before the competition starts. It featured a blue carpet walk taking place from inside Studio 10 (The Alex Trebek Stage) at Sony Pictures Studios, and several awards, such as the Alex Trebek Person of the Year and the Most Valuable Player award. It also features inductions into the Jeopardy! Hall of Fame. Since Season 40, Ken Jennings hosted the event and it took place at the set of the show since Season 41. The Season 39 Jeopardy! Honors event was hosted by Buzzy Cohen and took place at the Sony Pictures Plaza. The Season 40 Jeopardy! Honors took place next door at Studio 11 (the set of Wheel of Fortune).

=== Other regular tournaments ===
==== Teen Tournament ====
The Jeopardy! Teen Tournament, which began in 1987, was an annual tournament in which 15 high school students between the ages of 13 and 17 competed in a ten-episode tournament structured similarly to the Tournament of Champions. The winner receives $100,000 and entry into the Tournament of Champions.

Originally the winner of the Teen Tournament was awarded one of the automatic qualifying spots in the Tournament of Champions that followed their victory. Jeopardy! discontinued this practice after the 2000 Tournament of Champions, with Fall 1999 champion Chacko George being the final Teen Tournament winner to receive the berth; however, each subsequent Teen Tournament winner from 2001 through 2005 was invited to compete in 2005’s Ultimate Tournament of Champions.

Additionally, Teen Tournament winners have also received merchandise at various points: the winners of the Fall 1999, 2001, 2002, and 2003 Teen Tournaments were awarded new cars, and the 2005 Teen Tournament winner received a computer package. At least one similar tournament was held in May 1967 during Fleming's run, with the winner (out of nine high school seniors who competed) receiving a $10,000 scholarship. The tournament was last held in Season 35.

==== Teachers Tournament ====
In May 2011, to mark its 6,000th Trebek-era episode, Jeopardy! introduced its Teachers Tournament featuring 15 full-time teachers of students in kindergarten through grade 12. The tournament is similar in format to other tournaments, with the winner receiving a guaranteed minimum of $100,000 and an entry in to the Tournament of Champions. Second place wins $50,000 and third place wins $25,000 (again if their scores are higher, they win what they score), and players eliminated in the semifinals winning $10,000 and first round losers winning $5,000.

The tournament was not held in Season 37 (2020–21) because of pandemic restrictions, and in Season 38 (2021–22) was billed as the Professors Tournament, for collegiate professors. Mayim Bialik hosted the tournament in Season 38.

==== College Championship ====
Introduced in 1989, the Jeopardy! College Championship featured 15 full-time undergraduate college students, with the format being similar to the other tournaments. The winner receives $100,000 and an entry into the Tournament of Champions.

From 1997 until 2008, the College Championship was taped on various college campuses; an exception was the 2000-A College Championship as it was taped in Culver City.

The last syndicated College Championship was held in Season 36 (2019–20). It was not held in Season 37 (2020–21) due to travel restrictions amid the COVID-19 pandemic. In Season 38 (2021–22), it was reformatted and moved to primetime, billed as the National College Championship.

==== Second Chance Tournament ====
On October 17, 2022, Jeopardy! launched a Second Chance Tournament, featuring contestants who had high scores during a previous appearance but failed to win their games.

Eighteen contestants participated in the tournament, which spanned two consecutive weeks and 10 episodes. Each week was a separate competition, with three new contestants playing per day on Monday through Wednesday. The winners of these games advanced to a two-game match played on Thursday and Friday under the same scoring rules as in other tournaments, and the winner of this match received $35,000 and a slot in the Tournament of Champions.

Another such tournament was held at the start of Season 40, which spanned three consecutive weeks and 15 episodes with a total of 27 participants from Seasons 37 and 38. Each week was a separate competition, with three new contestants playing per day on Monday through Wednesday. The winners of these games advanced to a two-game match played on Thursday and Friday under the same scoring rules as in other tournaments, and the winner of this match received $35,000 and a slot in the Champions Wildcard Tournament.

A third tournament began on December 19, 2023, spanning 20 consecutive episodes with a total of 36 participants from Season 39 and following the above format.

Cash awards were as follows:

- Third place, semifinals: $2,000 ($1,000 before Season 39)
- Second place, semifinals: $3,000 ($2,000 before Season 39)
- Third place, finals: $15,000 ($10,000 before Season 39)
- Second place, finals: $15,000 ($20,000 before Season 39)
- Winner, finals: $35,000 and Tournament of Champions / Champions Wildcard Tournament entry

The fourth tournament was held on December 30, 2024, spanning two weeks with a total of 18 returning non-winning contestants from Season 40. The fifth tournament was held on December 15, 2025, and spanned three weeks featuring 27 of the past Season 41 non-winning contestants.

Unlike other tournaments, even if the scores exceed the minimum guarantees, finalists are only awarded the aforementioned cash prizes.

==== Champions Wildcard Tournament ====
On October 2, 2023, Jeopardy! launched a Champions Wildcard Tournament, featuring 105 champions from Seasons 37 and 38 in addition to the three winners of the Second Chance Tournament that had concluded the previous week. The 108 participants are divided into four brackets of 27, each designated by one of the four playing card suits (spades, diamonds, clubs, hearts). Within each bracket, nine quarterfinal games are played, with three new contestants per game, and the winners advance to three semifinal games. Those three winners then play a two-game final match, using the same scoring rules as in other tournaments, and the winner advances to the Tournament of Champions.

A second Champions Wildcard Tournament began on January 16, 2024, to feature 50 champions from Season 39 in addition to the four winners of the Second Chance Tournament that had concluded the previous day. The 54 participants are divided into two brackets of 27, with each bracket following the above rules. In order to reduce the total field for the first bracket to 27, two audio-only "play-in" games were held on January 12, broadcast on TuneIn. A third such game was held on February 2 to set the field for the second bracket. All three games were hosted by Buzzy Cohen, with the winners advancing to the Champions Wildcard tournament. Furthermore, Amy Schneider, the runner-up of that season's tournament, was also qualified into the Jeopardy! Masters tournament as a wildcard contestant, as chosen by producers.

The third Champions Wildcard Tournament started on January 13, 2025, featuring a reduced field of 15 champions from Season 40, including the two winners of the Second Chance Tournament that had concluded the previous week. As with most other tournaments during the Alex Trebek era, the winners of the five quarterfinal games plus the four highest-scoring non-winners advance to the three semifinal games. Those three semifinal winners then play a two-game final match, using the same aggregate scoring rules, and the winner advances to the Tournament of Champions. The other two finalists receive a consolation prize of $40,000. Additionally, Drew Goins, the runner-up of that season's tournament, was also invited to the Tournament of Champions due to Celebrity Jeopardy!'s season 2 winner Lisa Ann Walter's commitments to the ABC sitcom series Abbott Elementary.

The fourth Champions Wildcard Tournament began on January 5, 2026, with the same format structure as last season's tournament.

Cash awards are as follows:

- Eliminated in quarterfinals: $5,000
- Eliminated in semifinals: $10,000
- Third place, finals: $40,000 ($25,000 before Season 41)
- Second place, finals: $40,000 ($50,000 before Season 41)
- Winner, finals: $100,000 and Tournament of Champions entry

== Celebrity Jeopardy! and variants ==
=== Celebrity Jeopardy! ===
Celebrity Jeopardy!, whose inaugural episode aired on October 26, 1992, features notable individuals as contestants competing for charitable organizations of their choice (or, in the cases of public officials, relevant charities chosen by the Jeopardy! production staff). The tradition of special Jeopardy! matches featuring celebrity contestants goes back to the original NBC series, which featured appearances by such notables as Rod Serling, Bill Cullen, Art James, and Peter Marshall. On the Trebek version, Celebrity Jeopardy! traditionally had been broadcast annually as a weeklong event in the 1990s before becoming increasingly sparse and irregular in the 2000s and 2010s. Unlike the regular games in which a player finishing the Double Jeopardy! round with a zero or negative score is disqualified from playing the Final Jeopardy! round, Celebrity Jeopardy! instead grants players a nominal score of $1,000 with which to wager for the final round. Since its debut, Celebrity Jeopardy! has featured over 200 celebrity contestants. The most recent syndicated episodes under the title Celebrity Jeopardy! aired in May 2015; the title was later revived for an ABC network version as discussed below.

=== Million Dollar Celebrity Invitational ===
The Million Dollar Celebrity Invitational began on September 17, 2009, and subsequent games aired on the third Thursday of every month from September 2009 to April 2010, with an additional quarter-final on the third Friday of April 2010. The semi-final and final rounds aired during the first full week of May 2010. A total of 27 celebrities—three per game for the nine semifinal episodes—competed for a grand prize of $1,000,000 for their charity. The winners of each qualifying game returned in May 2010 for three semi-final games. However, Andy Richter, who won his quarterfinal game, was unable to make semifinal taping due to scheduling conflicts. Isaac Mizrahi replaced Richter as a wild card, using standard wild card rules. The semi-final winners competed in a two-day total point final to determine the grand champion in a format similar to other annual Jeopardy! tournaments. The winner of each qualifying game won a minimum of $50,000 for their charity (more if their post-Final Jeopardy! score exceeded $50,000), and the two runners-up each received $25,000 for their charities. Jane Curtin, Michael McKean, and Cheech Marin advanced to the two-game final, and McKean won the tournament, earning $1 million for his charity, the International Myeloma Foundation, Curtin on second place finisher, earning $250,000 for U.S. Fund for UNICEF and Marin with $100,000 third place prize going to Hispanic Scholarship Fund.

=== Power Players Week ===
Power Players Week began on November 17, 1997, and features personalities in journalism and politics. And because of this, episodes are always taped at DAR Constitution Hall. After the inaugural event, the next three Power Players Weeks were aired in May 2004 (Season 20); May 2012 (Season 28); and most recently, May 2016 (Season 32).

=== Primetime celebrity tournaments ===
In May 2022, ABC announced a one-hour network prime time version of Celebrity Jeopardy! to air Sunday nights beginning fall 2022, with the premiere date subsequently scheduled for September 25. Executive producer Michael Davies then confirmed in July that Mayim Bialik would host the primetime series. Rather than airing two games in a one-hour timeslot as with previous primetime versions, each edition features a single hour-long game, with two main changes: first, the Jeopardy! round uses $100 to $500 values and the Double Jeopardy! round uses $200 to $1,000 values (last used in 2001); second, a Triple Jeopardy! round is added, featuring tripled clue values ranging from $300 to $1,500 and three hidden Daily Double clues. The season had 27 players competing in a 13-week tournament with nine quarterfinals, three semifinals, and one final. The winner receives $1,000,000 for their charity and an entry into the Tournament of Champions. Celebrity contestants eliminated in the quarterfinals earned $30,000 for their charities, while those eliminated in the semifinals earned $50,000. Starting in season three, the non-winning finalists will receive $175,000 (previously $100,000 for third-place and $250,000 for second-place).

Beginning with the fall 2023 season, Ken Jennings replaced Bialik as host of Celebrity Jeopardy! due to Bialik's withdrawal in connection with the WGA and SAG-AFTRA strikes.

=== Saturday Night Live parodies ===
Celebrity Jeopardy! has repeatedly been parodied in a recurring sketch on Saturday Night Live, with Will Ferrell acting as Alex Trebek (with the real Alex Trebek making a cameo appearance in Ferrell's final sketch as a regular cast member). Comic foils to Alex Trebek (Ferrell) included Norm Macdonald as Burt Reynolds and Darrell Hammond as Sean Connery. Other parodies have been produced, including "Black Jeopardy!" featuring Kenan Thompson acting as a host.

== Other recurring events ==
When season 16 began in September 1999, the show inaugurated Kids Week, a week of five special non-tournament games featuring children aged 10 to 12. Three new contestants compete each day. The winners of each game keep whatever they win, with minimum guarantees of $15,000. The second- and third-place contestants receive consolation prizes of $2,000 and $1,000, respectively. The first four times the event was held, the player who had the highest winning score during the week was also awarded a bonus of $5,000. The last Kids Week episodes aired in 2014.

== Special events ==
=== ABC tournaments ===
Five Jeopardy! events have been scheduled outside the show's usual syndication run, all on ABC: Super Jeopardy! aired in 1990, The Greatest of All Time aired in 2020, the National College Championship aired in February 2022, the aforementioned Celebrity Jeopardy! primetime tournament aired from September 2022 to February 2023, September 2023 to January 2024, January to April 2025, March to May 2026 (as All Stars), and January 2027 and Jeopardy! Masters airing in May 2023, May 2024, April to June 2025, and August to September 2026. The ABC Owned Television Stations group has been the lead broadcaster of the syndicated version for most of its run.

==== Super Jeopardy! ====
Super Jeopardy! was a special summer series that premiered June 16, 1990, on ABC. It was the first attempt during Alex Trebek's hosting run to gather the series' best contestants up to that date.

A total of thirty-six contestants competed in Super Jeopardy!. Thirty-five of them were some of the biggest winners who had competed in the first six years of the syndicated Jeopardy! series that had aired to that point. The other spot was reserved for Burns Cameron, who had appeared on the original daytime series in 1965 and won a total of $11,110 in regular and tournament play to set that series' all-time record.

Super Jeopardy! featured four contestants per episode in the quarterfinal games, while subsequent rounds were played with the usual three players. Each game was played for points instead of money, and the clue values were adjusted accordingly; correct responses were worth 200–1000 points in the Jeopardy! round and 500–2500 points in Double Jeopardy!; this was the only time in the show's history that the second round values were not double those of the first round.

The tournament was divided into three parts, each lasting a total of four weeks. The first three weeks consisted of the quarterfinal matches, with the winners advancing to the semifinal match. The winner of that match advanced to the final, and the process would repeat until the three finalists were determined. Any contestant eliminated in the quarterfinal round won $5,000 and the contestants eliminated in the semifinal round won $10,000.

Bob Verini, winner of the 1987 Tournament of Champions, was the first to qualify for the final on July 7, 1990 when he defeated 1989 Teen Tournament winner Eric Newhouse and 1987 Tournament of Champions finalist Eugene Finerman in the first semifinal. The second semifinal took place on August 4 and was won by season 4 champion Bruce Seymour over season 3 champions Roger Storm and Keith Walker. The third semifinal was played on September 1 and won by season 3 champion Dave Traini over 1988 champion Jeff Richmond and Bob Blake, who had set a winnings record during his run in 1989. Seymour won the tournament final on the following episode, with Verini finishing second and Traini automatically placing third for finishing in negative territory after Double Jeopardy!

==== The Greatest of All Time ====
Announced on November 18, 2019, and aired beginning January 7, 2020, the tournament featured contestants Ken Jennings, Brad Rutter, and James Holzhauer competing in a tournament with a top prize of $1 million. The tournament was structured as first-to-three-wins format over a series of one-hour episodes, with each episode a stand-alone match consisting of two back-to-back complete Jeopardy! games, using points instead of dollars. Ken Jennings won the tournament in four matches, with James Holzhauer winning one match and Brad Rutter winning none. As the tournament winner, Jennings was named "The Greatest of All Time", won the $1 million prize, and reclaimed the top spot for most money won on a game show. Rutter and Holzhauer, the two runners-up, received $250,000 each.

==== National College Championship ====
The Jeopardy! National College Championship premiered on ABC on February 8, 2022. Unlike Super Jeopardy! and The Greatest of All Time, this tournament is an annual event. There are a few differences from the previous syndicated tournament: The format was changed to expand the pool to 36 contestants, and there are twelve quarterfinal matches and four semifinals, with no wild cards. The semifinalist who finishes in fourth place receives $35,000 and an entry into the Second Chance Tournament. The winner takes home $250,000 and an entry into the Tournament of Champions, while the runners-up receive $100,000 and $50,000 for second and third place, respectively. Eliminated semifinalists receive $20,000 while eliminated quarterfinalists receive $10,000.

==== Jeopardy! Masters ====
Jeopardy! Masters premiered on ABC on May 8, 2023, featuring six top Jeopardy! players competing for a grand prize of $500,000. The clues are valued in points instead of the traditional dollar amounts. The tournament was structured as a "Champions League-style" format, with the winner of each game receiving three match points, the second-place contestant receiving one match point, and the third-place contestant receiving zero match points. In the event of match point ties, they are broken by the following criteria in this order: the number of games won, the total number of correct responses for that stage of the competition (including Final Jeopardy!), the cumulative total score excluding Final Jeopardy! and Daily Double wagers, and the cumulative total score excluding only Final Jeopardy! wagers. The bottom two contestants with the lowest match points at the end of the quarterfinals are eliminated and receive $75,000 for fifth place and $50,000 for sixth place. The match point values are reset during the semifinals, at which the contestant with the lowest match points receives the $100,000 fourth-place prize. In the finals, the winner is determined based on the two-game total point values, with second place receiving $250,000 and third place receiving $150,000. Additionally, in the first season, all three finalists will receive entry into the season two Masters tournament.

For season three only, the number of top Jeopardy! players was increased to nine, with the tournament now being a four-round structure. The bottom three contestants with the lowest match points following the initial round are eliminated and receive $15,000 each. The same cash prizes are still awarded for first- through sixth-place contestants.

=== Other all-time best tournaments ===
==== 10th Anniversary Tournament ====
From November 29 to December 3, 1993, Jeopardy! held a special one-week 10th Anniversary Tournament to honor the Trebek version's 10th season, which featured one Tournament of Champions-qualified contestant from each of the nine completed seasons to that point. Eight contestants were drawn at random and were revealed over the course of four episodes. After Tom Nosek won the 1993 Tournament of Champions, he received the ninth position.

Contestants competed for a winner's prize of a combined two-day final score total plus a $25,000 bonus. The event resembled the show's regular tournaments sans a quarterfinal round, with three semifinal matches to determine three finalists, who then competed against each other in a two-game total point match. Eliminated semifinalists received consolation prizes of $5,000, while the second runner-up received a guaranteed minimum of $7,500, the first runner-up received a guaranteed minimum of $10,000, and the winner earned his or her two-game total plus a $25,000 bonus. Frank Spangenberg won the tournament with a two-game score of $16,800 plus a $25,000 bonus for a total of $41,800. Tom Nosek finished second with $13,600, while Leslie Frates won the $7,500 guaranteed third place prize, which exceeded her score of $4,499.

==== Million Dollar Masters ====
In May 2002, to commemorate the Trebek version's 4,000th episode, Jeopardy! invited fifteen former champions to participate in a special tournament called the Million Dollar Masters Tournament, with a guaranteed seven-figure payday for the winner. The tournament was held at Radio City Music Hall in New York City and featured the same two-week, three-round format as the traditional tournaments on Jeopardy! The event's first round ran from May 1 to May 7, and the three semifinal matches aired from May 8–10. The three finalists were Eric Newhouse, who won the 1989 Teen Tournament and the special 1998 Teen Reunion Tournament; Brad Rutter, a five-time champion from 2000 who won the Tournament of Champions held earlier in the 2001–02 season; and Bob Verini, the winner of the 1987 Tournament of Champions and the runner-up in the 1990 Super Jeopardy! tournament. The tournament ended with Rutter winning the $1,000,000 grand prize, Newhouse coming in second and winning $100,000, and Verini placing third and winning $50,000.

==== Ultimate Tournament of Champions ====
The Ultimate Tournament of Champions was a special 15-week single-elimination tournament held during Season 21. It began airing on February 9, 2005, and concluded on May 25, 2005, covering 76 shows in total. The overall winner of the tournament would receive a cash prize of $2 million, with the first runner-up receiving an additional $500,000 and the second an additional $250,000.

The producers of Jeopardy! invited 144 former contestants from the previous twenty seasons to participate. The invitations were given to any past five-time champion in regular play, as well as winners of the Tournament of Champions, College Championship, and Teen Tournament in past years. Of the 144 contestants invited, 135 would face off in the first nine weeks of the tournament and the winners of those matches would advance to the next round of play. The two finalists would then advance to face Ken Jennings, who automatically received a bye to immediately advance to the final round.

The other nine contestants were given byes into the next round of competition, and were selected by the producers based on their accomplishments during their runs on the show. Six of the byes were given to these contestants:

- Chuck Forrest, who set an early winnings record by recording $72,800 in his five wins as champion during 1986; also won the subsequent Tournament of Champions
- Frank Spangenberg, who became the first champion to surpass $100,000 in regular game play when he won $102,597 in 1990
- Brian Weikle, who was the highest money winner in regular play before the elimination of the five-game limit, won $149,200 in 2003
- Robin Carroll, who won $214,100 across her five wins in 1999, the 2000 Tournament of Champions, and the 2001 International Tournament of Champions; at the time, she was the highest winning female contestant
- Sean Ryan, who became the first contestant to win six games when he did so in 2003; won a total of $125,797 over his reign as champion
- Tom Walsh, who won seven games and $186,900 during 2004; at the time, his wins and earnings total were regular play records that were surpassed by Jennings later in the year

The last three contestants to receive byes were the finalists from the most recent alumni tournament, the 2002 Million Dollar Masters:

- Brad Rutter, the winner of the tournament; won five games in 2000 and the 2001 Tournament of Champions
- Eric Newhouse, the first runner-up; won the 1989 Teen Tournament and the 1998 Teen Reunion Tournament
- Bob Verini, the second runner-up; won five games in 1987 and the Tournament of Champions that same year, finished second in 1990 Super Jeopardy! tournament

The eighteen winners from the second round advanced to the quarterfinals, and the six winners from those matches faced off in the semifinals for the chance to face Jennings in the finals. Both semifinal matchups were conducted as two-day, cumulative score matches, with the highest combined score advancing. The first semifinal was won by 1992 Tournament of Champions finalist Jerome Vered, who defeated Frank Spangenberg and 2000 College Champion Pam Mueller. Brad Rutter won the other semifinal over 1993 champion John Cuthbertson and 2004 champion Chris Miller.

Rutter, Vered, and Jennings then competed in a three-game cumulative score final match for the top prize. Rutter, who had the highest total in all three of the games, finished with $62,000 and won the $2,000,000 prize. Jennings finished second with $34,599 and collected $500,000, while Vered finished third with $20,600, and took home $250,000. All in all, the tournament's contestants won a combined grand total of $5,604,413.

==== Battle of the Decades ====
In 2014, Jeopardy! held a special 5-week tournament billed as the Battle of the Decades to commemorate the Trebek version's 30th season, involving a total of 45 former champions from each of the first 29 completed seasons to that point, and divided into three decades (1984–1993, 1994–2003, and 2004–2013). The winner of the tournament would receive a cash prize of $1 million.

There were five matches from each decade to decide who advances to the quarterfinals. The first decade was aired February 3 to 7, 2014, with the second decade airing March 3 to 7, 2014; and the third aired from March 31 to April 4, 2014.

The quarterfinal matches aired May 5–9, 2014; and the semifinals and finals aired May 12–16, 2014. Ken Jennings, Brad Rutter, and Roger Craig competed in the two-day cumulative score final match for the championship. Rutter won the tournament and took home the $1,000,000 prize. Jennings finished as the first runner-up with $100,000, while Craig was the second runner-up taking home $50,000.

==== All-Star Games ====
The Jeopardy! All-Star Games, conducted in 2019, featured a team format in which eighteen champions were split up into six groups of three. The six teams were captained by Jennings, Rutter, Colby Burnett, Buzzy Cohen, Austin Rogers and Julia Collins, who each drafted two players from a pool that included Leonard Cooper, Roger Craig, Jennifer Giles, Ben Ingram, Matt Jackson, Alex Jacob, Larissa Kelly, Alan Lin, David Madden, Pam Mueller, Monica Thieu, and Seth Wilson. The draft was streamed live over Facebook on September 22, 2018, with the games themselves airing from February 20 to March 5, 2019. A concurrent fantasy sweepstakes awarded a prize to a home viewer who selected the highest-grossing three individual contestants in the tournament. Team Colby consisted of Burnett, Mueller and Lin, Team Buzzy consisted of Cohen, Jacob, and Giles, Team Julia consisted of Collins, Ingram, and Wilson, Team Ken consisted of Jennings, Jackson, and Thieu; Team Austin consisted of Rogers, Craig, and Cooper, and Team Brad consisted of Rutter, Kelly, and Madden. Each match was played as a relay; one player on each team played a different round of the game, with the winning trio splitting a $1,000,000 prize. Rutter's team won the contest, with Jennings's team finishing second and splitting $300,000; Burnett's team (the wild card entry) came in third, splitting $100,000.

=== Reunion tournaments ===
A special one-week Teen Reunion Tournament held in November 1998 invited back 12 former Teen Tournament contestants from that event's first three installments (1987–1989) to compete in a single-elimination tournament. The three highest-scoring winners of the four semifinal matches competed in a one-game final where the champion received $50,000; the second and third-place players received $15,000 and $10,000, respectively. The semifinal winner who did not participate in the finals received $7,500, and the other contestants each received $5,000. The tournament was won by Eric Newhouse, who had previously won the 1989 Teen Tournament.

The Jeopardy! Kids Week Reunion brought back 15 Kids Week alumni from the 1999 and 2000 Kids Week games to compete for a minimum $25,000 each game. The special week of programming was taped on August 12, 2008, and was broadcast from September 15 to 19, 2008.

A December 2022 announcement detailed a second teen reunion tournament, billed as the High School Reunion Tournament. 27 contestants, all from the two Season 35 tournaments (2018–19), participated in a three-week tournament, with a $100,000 prize and the winner competing in the 2023 Tournament of Champions, the first time a Teen Tournament player has been invited to a Tournament of Champions since 2005's Ultimate Tournament of Champions. Mayim Bialik hosted the tournament, consisting of nine quarterfinal games, three semifinal games, and a two-game total-point final, with no wild cards.

=== Jeopardy! Invitational Tournament ===
The Jeopardy! Invitational Tournament began on March 20, 2024, with a field of 27 past champions and favorite contestants. The quarterfinal and semifinal rounds followed the same structure as the Champions Wildcard Tournament, but the finals were decided by the first contestant to win two games. Prize amounts were the same as for Champions Wildcard; in addition, the champion advanced to the 2024 Jeopardy! Masters Tournament. It was also announced that one of the other two finalists is also invited to the 2024 Jeopardy! Masters Tournament as a wildcard contestant, chosen by the producers. For season 41, all three finalists also received an invitation to the 2025 Jeopardy! Masters tournament. For season 42, two of the three finalists also received an invitation to the 2026 Jeopardy! Masters tournament, which are reserved for the champion and the runner-up.

The winner received $150,000 in 2025 and $100,000 in 2024. Second place received $50,000; third place also received $50,000 in 2025 but received $25,000 in 2024. Semifinalists earned $10,000 each, and quarterfinalists earned $5,000 each.

=== IBM Challenge ===
A special three day exhibition match, Jeopardy!'s IBM Challenge, aired February 14 to 16, 2011, and featured IBM's Watson computer facing off against Jennings and Rutter in two games, played over three shows. This was the first man-vs.-machine competition in Jeopardy!'s history. Watson locked up the first game and the match to win the grand prize of $1 million, which IBM divided between two charities (World Vision International and World Community Grid). Jennings, who won $300,000 for second place, and Rutter, who won the $200,000 third-place prize, both pledged to donate half of their total winnings to their respective charities (Ken's charity was VillageReach, while Brad's was the Lancaster County Community Foundation). The competition brought the show its highest ratings since the Ultimate Tournament of Champions.

=== International Tournaments ===
One-week tournaments featuring champions from each of the international versions of Jeopardy! were held in 1996, 1997, and 2001. Each of the countries that aired their own version of the show in those years could nominate a contestant. The format was identical to the semifinals and finals of the Tournament of Champions, save for the inaugural 1996 tournament, which was conducted over four days and featured a one-game final match. The 1996 tournament took place in the normal Jeopardy! studio in California, while the 1997 tournament took place on the set of the Swedish version of the program in Stockholm and the 2001 tournament was held at the Las Vegas Hilton in Nevada.

In the first two tournaments, the winner was awarded $25,000, while the first and second runners-up received $10,000 and $7,500 respectively, with semifinalists receiving $5,000. For the 2001 tournament, the winner's prize was doubled to $50,000, while the two runners-up received $15,000 and $10,000.

The 1996 international tournament was titled the Olympic Games Tournament, as part of promotional tie-ins for the 1996 Summer Olympics being conducted across Jeopardy! and Wheel of Fortune. It was won by Ulf Jensen from Sweden, while Michael Daunt from Canada won the second and Robin Carroll from the United States won the third. The second tournament actually featured two contestants from the American series, with the United States represented by 1996 three-time champion Gay Mollette; Daunt, who placed third in the Tournament of Champions earlier in the 1996–97 season, was one of many Canadians to compete on Jeopardy! over the years as Canada does not have its own English version of the program (a short-lived French version ran from 1991-1993).

== See also ==
- List of notable Jeopardy! contestants
- Strategies and skills of Jeopardy! champions
