= Strategies and skills of Jeopardy! champions =

Winning strategies used by Jeopardy! champions

Jeopardy! is an American quiz game show in which contestants use certain strategies and skills to increase their chances of winning each game, win the most games, and ensure large winnings.

== Strategies and skills ==
The layout of the Jeopardy! game board since November 26, 2001, showing the dollar values used in the first round (in the second round, the values are doubled). Categories at the top of the board vary between each round and episode.

From the outset, contestants tend to have exceptional natural abilities they are born with and skills they develop, such as very high intelligence, excellent recall memory, superior knowledge of trivia and other facts, and lightning mental and motor reaction times.

Because memory, reaction time, and certain other brain functions decline with age, Ken Jennings said in 2004 that "It's kind of a young person's game." Therefore, one would think that older players cannot do well, but here their greater acquired knowledge may compensate for the negative effects of older age.

=== Buzzer management ===
The timing of when to hit the buzzer is crucial, as the show uses a lock-out device to determine in real-time which contestant has activated their signal first. Mastering the signaling device is commonly said to be at least as important as knowing the correct response to each clue.

Speed is essential, as getting the opportunity to answer more clues first and right allows a player to pick more clues, thus increasing their chances of finding the Daily Doubles. Winning contestants have a "just go for it" mentality and often push the buzzer before they know if they can answer correctly, trusting that they probably can. Playing fast is part of James Holzhauer's "optimal strategy".

=== Category and question management ===
Starting at the bottom with the high-value clues is part of the "Forrest Bounce" strategy and wins the most money, keeps the other contestants from earning as much, and increases the chances of finding the Daily Doubles. Alex Trebek objected to this strategy, as the clues become more difficult as one moves down the board.

The "Forrest Bounce" is a strategy, named after Chuck Forrest, in which contestants randomly pick clues to confuse opponents, as well as choosing higher-value clues from the bottom of the board. The Forrest Bounce is applied in the Jeopardy! and Double Jeopardy! rounds with the player in control of the board "bouncing" between different categories rather than continuing through individual categories in sequence. According to Forrest, "The basic point is, you know where you're going next and [your competitors] don't."

Holzhauer does so "for a different reason — trying to win all the higher-value clues early in a game so he has more money to wager if he lands on one of the coveted Daily Double squares".

"Category priming" is the act of immediately, as soon as one sees a category, "thinking in advance of items that fit". Psychologist Michael J. Kahana described an example: "So Alex Trebek is asking for Broadway songwriters? Prime your brain by thinking ahead about Gershwin and Sondheim, along with more recent notables such as Lin-Manuel Miranda and Elton John." Holzhauer admits to doing it, but "only for Final Jeopardy (and only for relatively narrow categories like 'European Capitals') as I felt it would be too distracting at any other point."

=== Wagering strategies ===
Champions scour the board for the Daily Doubles. There is one in the Jeopardy! round and two in Double Jeopardy! round. They are most often located in rows 3–5 but can appear on the 2nd row (they never appear on the top row). Researcher Nathan Yau created a complete statistical chart and found that the fourth row is "prime Daily Double territory", with different good and bad areas in the rows and columns. Daily Doubles were "almost never in the top two rows".

Statistics show significant beneficial effects for simply finding a Daily Double. They show that contestants "who don't land on the Daily Double at all have the lowest chance of winning...[and their] chance of winning increases with the number of Daily Doubles" they find. Those who answer correctly have an even bigger chance of winning the game.

Champions bet as much as possible for categories they know well, but in a manner that avoids losing the game if they are wrong. That means they sometimes place very small bets for categories they know little about: When Arthur Chu "came across a Daily Double in a category he knew nothing about — 'The Sports Hall of Fame' for instance" — he only bet $5, the lowest amount a contestant can wager in a Daily Double. When he then answered the sports question incorrectly his loss was minimal and he also stole a potential chance for his competitors (who might have more sports knowledge) to make a substantial gain.

Even if one guesses wrong on a Daily Double, it blocks others from getting a chance to answer. Statistics show that "While contestants who answer correctly have the best odds, even a wrong answer to a Daily Double appears better than no Daily Double."

Most contestants have played in a manner that prioritized winning the game and returning to play again, rather than maximizing the dollar value of their winnings. Arthur Chu and Keith Williams used this strategy. Chu used game theory to guide his betting: "Chu's goal wasn't to win the most money per day. Rather, he used game theory to give himself the highest probability of being able to return to the show the next day to play again." Alex Jacob and James Holzhauer, both of whom came from gambling backgrounds, were outliers: both made extremely aggressive Daily Double wagers (and to lesser extent on Final Jeopardy! wagers) that risked a game loss, but offered huge monetary gains if successful. Jennings credited the adoption of the high-risk strategy for his victory over Holzhauer and Rutter in The Greatest of All Time.

Many general and specific betting strategies have been described by fans who study the game and discover how contestants use them.

Various researchers have studied Final Jeopardy! wagering strategies. If the leader's score is more than twice the second place contestant's score (a situation known as a "runaway game"), the leader can guarantee victory by making a sufficiently small wager. Otherwise, according to Jeopardy! College Champion Keith Williams, the leader usually wagers in a way that they will end up with a dollar more than twice the second place contestant's score, guaranteeing a win with a correct response. Writing about Jeopardy! wagering in the 1990s, Gilbert and Hatcher said that "most players wager aggressively". A particularly high-risk situation occurs when two contestants are tied for the lead going into Final Jeopardy! In order to have a chance at victory without relying on the other tied contestant's response being incorrect, both must wager their entire score and hope for a tiebreaker clue if both are correct; if both do so and are wrong, the contestant in third place (no matter how distant) can ensure victory by wagering anything less than their score.

A Swedish study has found factors that tend to favor men. When betting on Daily Double clues, men tend to bet more than women, even though men and women tend to answer correctly at nearly the same rate. Men also tend to answer correctly more often "when playing against only other men".

=== Preparation ===
To prepare for the game, Champions have used Wikipedia's wikilinks to learn quickly; read as much as they can, especially children's books; watched reruns of Jeopardy!; scouted other winners and adjusted playing tactics accordingly; overlearned; and self-tested by taking the practice test often. A disproportionate number of Jeopardy! champions studied mathematics or computer science in college; Armando Fox, a computer science professor and former contestant on Win Ben Stein's Money, and J. P. Allen, a former Professor's Tournament contestant, postulated that STEM fields tend to draw people with analytical skills and the ability to catalog information, making them well-suited for games and quiz shows. Allen and Fox also noted that a background in liberal arts can also broaden a contestant's repertoire of knowledge, and that the two longest-running contestants, Jennings and Schneider, had backgrounds in both. A large number of contestants, and the majority of Teen Tournament and College Tournament contestants, competed in quiz bowl in high school, particularly the National Academic Quiz Tournaments, which Jennings described as a de facto minor league for Jeopardy! and other game shows.

== Strategies of select top champions ==
Many contestants throughout the show's history have received significant media attention and winnings because of their success on Jeopardy!, particularly Brad Rutter, who has won the most money on the show and was undefeated by a human until 2020; Ken Jennings, who has the show's longest winning streak; James Holzhauer, who holds several of the show's highest overall daily scores; and Amy Schneider, who has the second-longest winning streak.

=== Brad Rutter ===
Brad Rutter (first episode October 30, 2000) is the record holder for lifetime winnings.

Rutter first picks clues from the center of the board because that "is where the daily doubles are". He will often push the buzzer before he knows if he can answer correctly, trusting that he probably can.

=== Ken Jennings ===
Ken Jennings (first episode June 2, 2004) holds the record for the longest winning streak (74) and the record for the highest average correct responses per game.

Jennings, like Rutter, first picks clues from the center of the board and will often push the buzzer before he knows if he can answer correctly, trusting that he probably can. This was a regular strategy during the Art Fleming era, when contestants could ring in immediately after the clue was revealed instead of waiting for Fleming to finish reading the clues; Fleming noted that Trebek's 1985 decision to require contestants to wait until he finishes reading the clue made the show "a different game" and argued that the original rule increased the natural jeopardy of the game.

=== James Holzhauer ===
James Holzhauer (first episode April 4, 2019) holds the record for single-day winnings and is fourth in number of games won (32) behind Jennings, Amy Schneider, and Matt Amodio.

Holzhauer used the "Forrest Bounce" strategy, aggressive Daily Double wagering, and played all of the higher-valued clues first. He reads children's books and watches reruns of Jeopardy!. He first picks clues from the center of the board and will often push the buzzer before he knows if he can answer correctly, trusting that he probably can.

Holzhauer's optimal strategy is to "Play fast, build a stack, bet big, and hope for the best." He is noted for his very large bets, which, given that he is a professional gambler, seem to come easy.

=== Matt Amodio ===
Matt Amodio (first episode July 21, 2021) has the third-longest winning streak (38), behind Ken Jennings and Amy Schneider, and he is the third millionaire contestant on the show in regular-season play. He is the third-highest earner of all time in regular-season play, second-most successful in consecutive games won and fourth-biggest all-time winner.

Amodio is noted for starting his responses with what's, even when alternative phrases such as "what are" and "who is" better fit the response. He chose this method to avoid considering all interrogative words and possibly speed his response time, as Jeopardy! rules accept any question containing the correct response. He has credited Wikipedia's wikilinks format for allowing him to meander through various topics in a random but logical progression and learn content quickly. His strategy of "bet[ting] big to win big" gives him "insurmountable leads by the time Final Jeopardy rolls around".

=== Amy Schneider ===
Amy Schneider (first episode November 17, 2021), won her 40th regular season game on January 25, 2022, and is second all-time in number of consecutive games won. By January 7, 2022, she had won $1,019,600, becoming the fourth millionaire contestant in regular-season play. During season 38, Schneider qualified as the second seed in the next Tournament of Champions.

Schneider has explained that when she sees a category where she is weak, she gets it "out of the way first. That way, if there were any doubles in that category, they would come up when there wasn't as much money to be wagered." Later, she described her wagering strategy in a runaway game with little competition: "...round up the second place score to the nearest thousand, double it, subtract it from my score, and then subtract another thousand in case I'd messed something up. So $5800->$6000->$12000, $30000–$12000–$1000=$17000."

Schneider said that doing crossword puzzles helps her think of words "as both a concept and a collection of letters at the same time".

=== Isaac Hirsch ===
Isaac Hirsch has said that he uses flash cards to memorise information. He's also said that pressing the buzzer is as important as knowing the question. To practice buzzing, Hirsch bought a replica buzzer to use while playing along to Jeopardy! at home.
