= Game show =

Genre of broadcast program where contestants compete for prizes

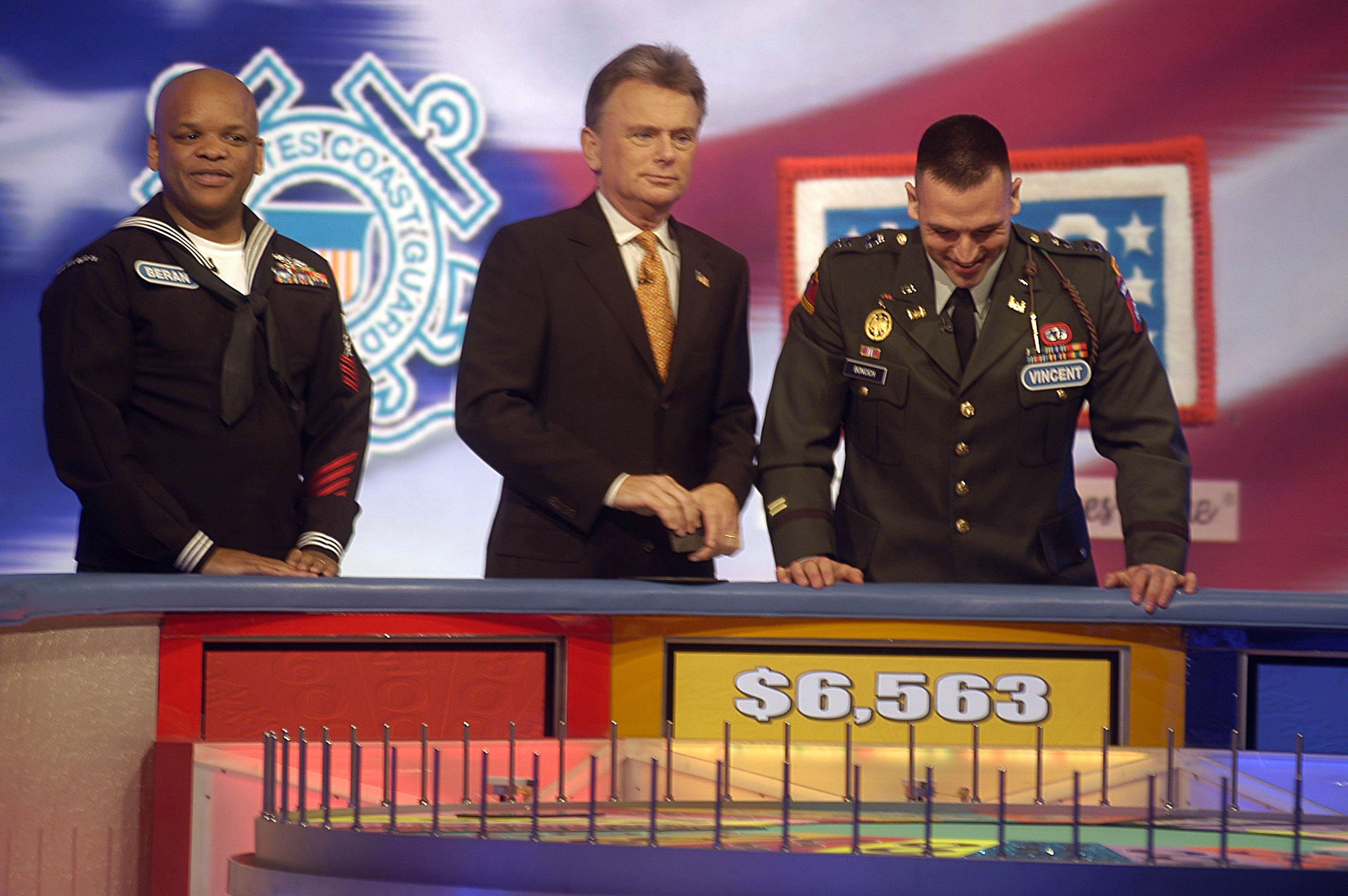
Navy servicemen participate in television game show Wheel of Fortune.

A game show (or gameshow) is a genre of broadcast viewing entertainment where contestants compete in a game for rewards. The shows are typically directed by a host, who explains the rules of the program as well as commentating and narrating where necessary. The history of the game shows dates back to the late 1930s when both radio and television game shows were broadcast. The genre became popular in the United States in the 1950s, becoming a regular feature of daytime television.

For the purposes of this article, a traditional game show is defined as a radio, television or streaming contest in which prizes can be won within a single episode through objective completion of tasks and not through fan or contestant votes, additionally, contestants, television personalities or celebrities, sometimes as part of a team, play a game which involves answering trivia questions or solving puzzles, usually for prizes such as cash, trips and goods and services.

== Criteria ==
In a game show, prizes can typically be won in a single match (in some cases, particularly in the ones that offer record-setting prizes, contestants can play multiple matches and accumulate a larger total), though the exact definition of a game show in the modern era is more broad compared to when game shows began in the early 20th century. Jeopardy! is an example of a game show where contestants can continue to play on the show for an unlimited amount of time (as long as they keep winning), and Jeopardy! is, to date, the only trivia-based game show that allows contestants to make unlimited consecutive appearances. Game shows are, in most cases, distinguishable from reality television competition shows, in which the competition consumes an entire season of episodes and typically involve either judging or voting, which is antithetical to how a game show is conducted as a game show requires a contestant to complete an objective series of tasks.

Any show that includes judging and voting is not counted as a game show (with the exception of Weakest Link); therefore, shows such as American Idol, America's Got Talent, The X Factor, etc., do not count as game shows, as they all involve both judging and voting and fall under the reality show umbrella; thus, the $10,000,000 prize won by Jeffrey Randall Allen in Beast Games, the $5,000,000 prize Melanie Amaro and Tate Stevens both won on The X Factor, the $4,560,000 prize won by Mai Whelan on Squid Game: The Challenge and Sandra Diaz-Twine's and Tony Vlachos's two wins from Survivor do not count as prizes won on game shows. Weakest Link, however, is a major gray area in this regard as it does feature contestant voting, however, it does meet the criteria for a game show as the show contains trivia, and prize money can also be won within one single episode.

Additionally, a streaming platform (as it relates to this article) is defined as an American subscription streaming media service owned by a major corporation. Therefore, any prizes won on game shows streaming on Netflix, HBO Max, Disney+/Hulu, Amazon Prime, Paramount+, Peacock and Apple TV do qualify as prizes won on a game show. Any money won on social media sites (YouTube, Instagram, Facebook, Twitter, etc.) qualify as reality content, not game shows, and do not qualify as a game show win.

In recent years, there have been shows that have aired that count as reality game shows, which are a hybrid of a traditional game show and a reality competition. Examples of a reality game show are American Ninja Warrior, Deal or No Deal Island, Double Dare, Holey Moley, Legends of the Hidden Temple, Minute to Win It, The Amazing Race and Wipeout. These are competition shows that require contestants to complete a series of tasks to advance, and also do not use any voting system to determine an outcome. Survivor, American Gladiators and BattleBots do not meet these criteria; Survivor includes contestant voting that results in a contestant being eliminated, American Gladiators features some elements of staged performance on the show (staging a game show in any form is illegal under federal law) and BattleBots has elements of judging, which does not meet the requirements of a game show.

== History ==
=== 1930s–1950s ===
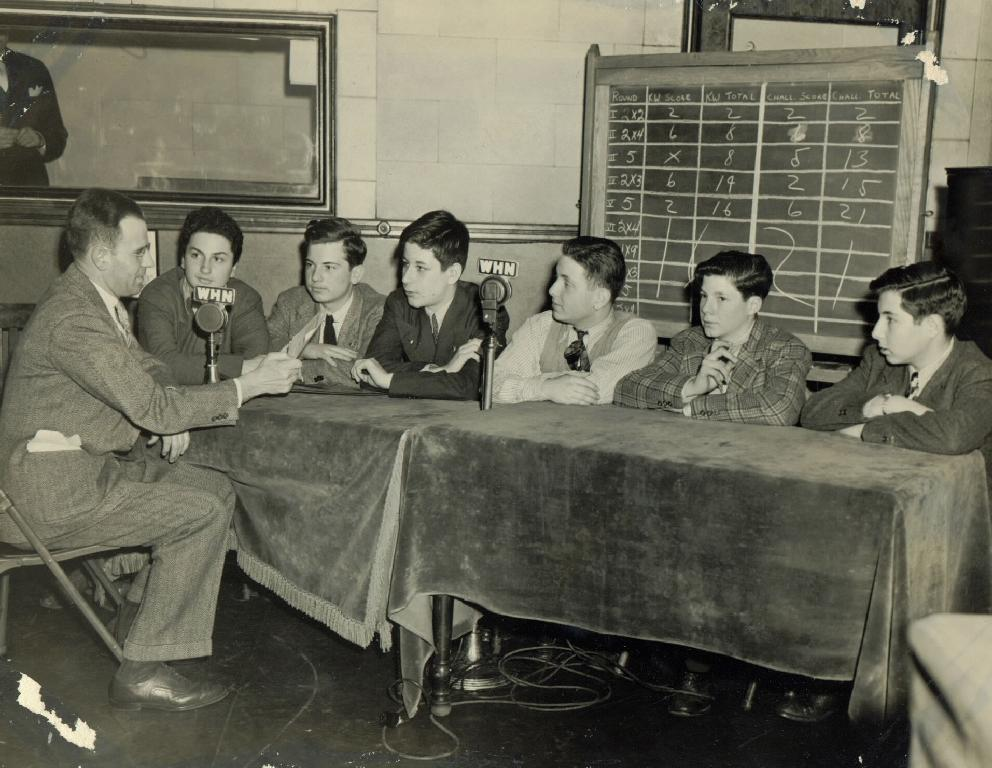
1938 radio quiz show Whiz Kids on WHN Radio in New York

Game shows began to appear on radio and television in the late 1930s. The first television game show, Spelling Bee, as well as the first radio game show, Information Please, were both broadcast in 1938; the first major success in the game show genre was Dr. I.Q., a radio quiz show that began in 1939.

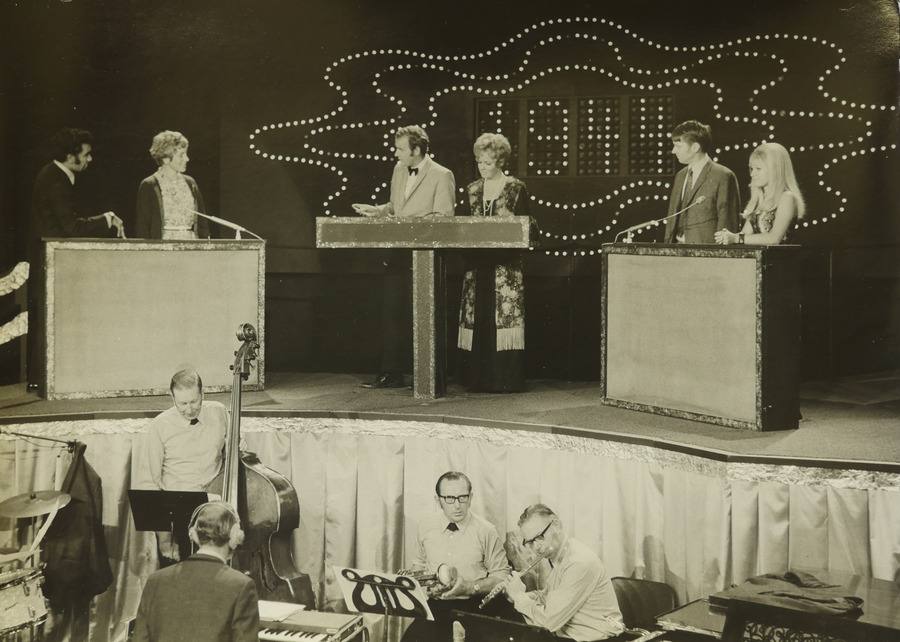
Note For Note, a New Zealand game show from around 1960

Truth or Consequences was the first game show to air on commercially licensed television; CBS Television Quiz followed shortly thereafter as the first to be regularly scheduled. The first episode of each aired in 1941 as an experimental broadcast. Over the course of the 1950s, as television began to pervade the popular culture, game shows quickly became a fixture. Daytime game shows would be played for lower stakes to target stay-at-home housewives. Higher-stakes programs would air in prime time. (One particular exception in this era was You Bet Your Life, ostensibly a game show, but the game show concept was largely a framework for a talk show moderated by its host, Groucho Marx.) During the late 1950s, high-stakes games such as Twenty-One and The $64,000 Question began a rapid rise in popularity. However, the rise of quiz shows proved to be short-lived. In 1959, many of the higher stakes game shows were exposed as being either biased or outright scripted in the 1950s quiz show scandals and ratings declines led to most of the primetime games being canceled.

An early variant of the game show, the panel show, survived the quiz show scandals. On shows like What's My Line?, I've Got a Secret, and To Tell the Truth, panels of celebrities would interview a guest in an effort to determine some fact about them; in others, celebrities would answer questions. Panel games had success in primetime until the late 1960s, when they were collectively dropped from television because of their perceived low budget nature. Panel games made a comeback in American daytime television (where the lower budgets were tolerated) in the 1970s through comedy-driven shows such as Match Game and Hollywood Squares. In the UK, commercial demographic pressures were not as prominent, and restrictions on game shows made in the wake of the scandals limited the style of games that could be played and the amount of money that could be awarded. Panel shows there were kept in primetime and have continued to thrive; they have transformed into showcases for the nation's top stand-up comedians on shows such as Have I Got News for You, Would I Lie to You?, Mock the Week, QI, and 8 Out of 10 Cats, all of which put a heavy emphasis on comedy, leaving the points as mere formalities. The focus on quick-witted comedians has resulted in strong ratings, which, combined with low costs of production, have only spurred growth in the UK panel show phenomenon.

=== 1960s–1970s ===
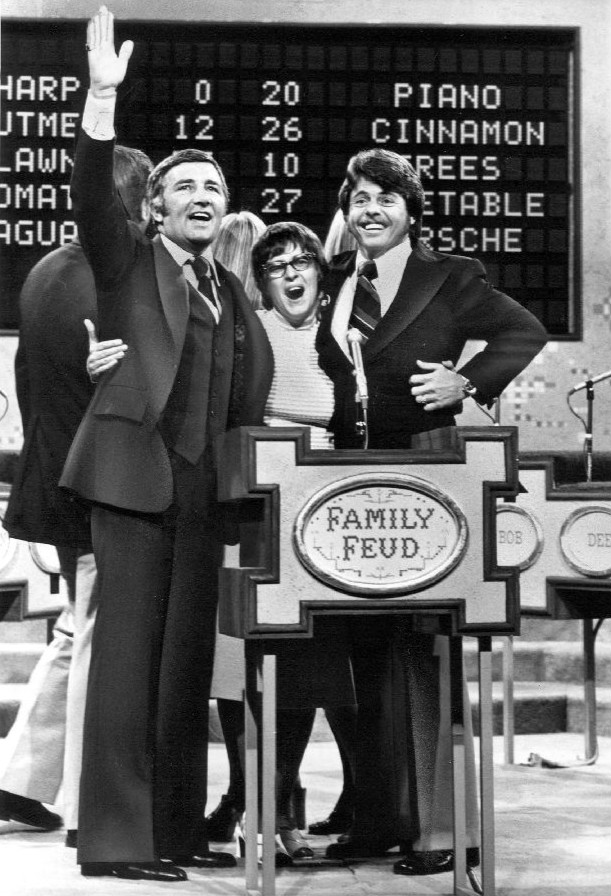
Richard Dawson hosting the US television gameshow Family Feud in 1976

Game shows remained a fixture of American daytime television through the 1960s after the quiz show scandals. Lower-stakes games made a slight comeback in daytime in the early 1960s; examples include Jeopardy! which began in 1964 and the original version of The Match Game first aired in 1962. Let's Make a Deal began in 1963 and the 1960s also marked the debut of Hollywood Squares, Password, The Dating Game, and The Newlywed Game.

Though CBS gave up on daytime game shows in 1968, the other networks did not follow suit. Color television was introduced to the game show genre in the late 1960s on all three networks. The 1970s saw a renaissance of the game show as new games and massive upgrades to existing games made debuts on the major networks. The New Price Is Right, an update of the 1950s-era game show The Price Is Right, debuted in 1972 and marked CBS's return to the game show format in its rural purge, a shift toward programming that would appeal to wealthier, suburban audiences. The Match Game became "Big Money" Match Game 73, which proved popular enough to prompt a spin-off, Family Feud, on ABC in 1976. The $10,000 Pyramid and its numerous higher-stakes derivatives also debuted in 1973, while the 1970s also saw the return of formerly disgraced producer and game show host Jack Barry, who debuted The Joker's Wild and a clean version of the previously rigged Tic-Tac-Dough in the 1970s. Wheel of Fortune debuted on NBC in 1975. The Prime Time Access Rule, which took effect in 1971, barred networks from broadcasting in the 7–8 p.m. time slot immediately preceding prime time, opening up time slots for syndicated programming. Most of the syndicated programs were "nighttime" adaptations of network daytime game shows. These game shows originally aired once a week, but by the late 1970s and early 1980s most of the games had transitioned to five days a week. These new game shows of the 1970s were noted for their broad, raucous and lowbrow environments, drawing scorn from industry critics; Price, Match Game and Feud developer Mark Goodson resented the poor reputation his games had brought him in the industry while noting he was proud of the commercial success they brought.

=== 1980s–1990s ===
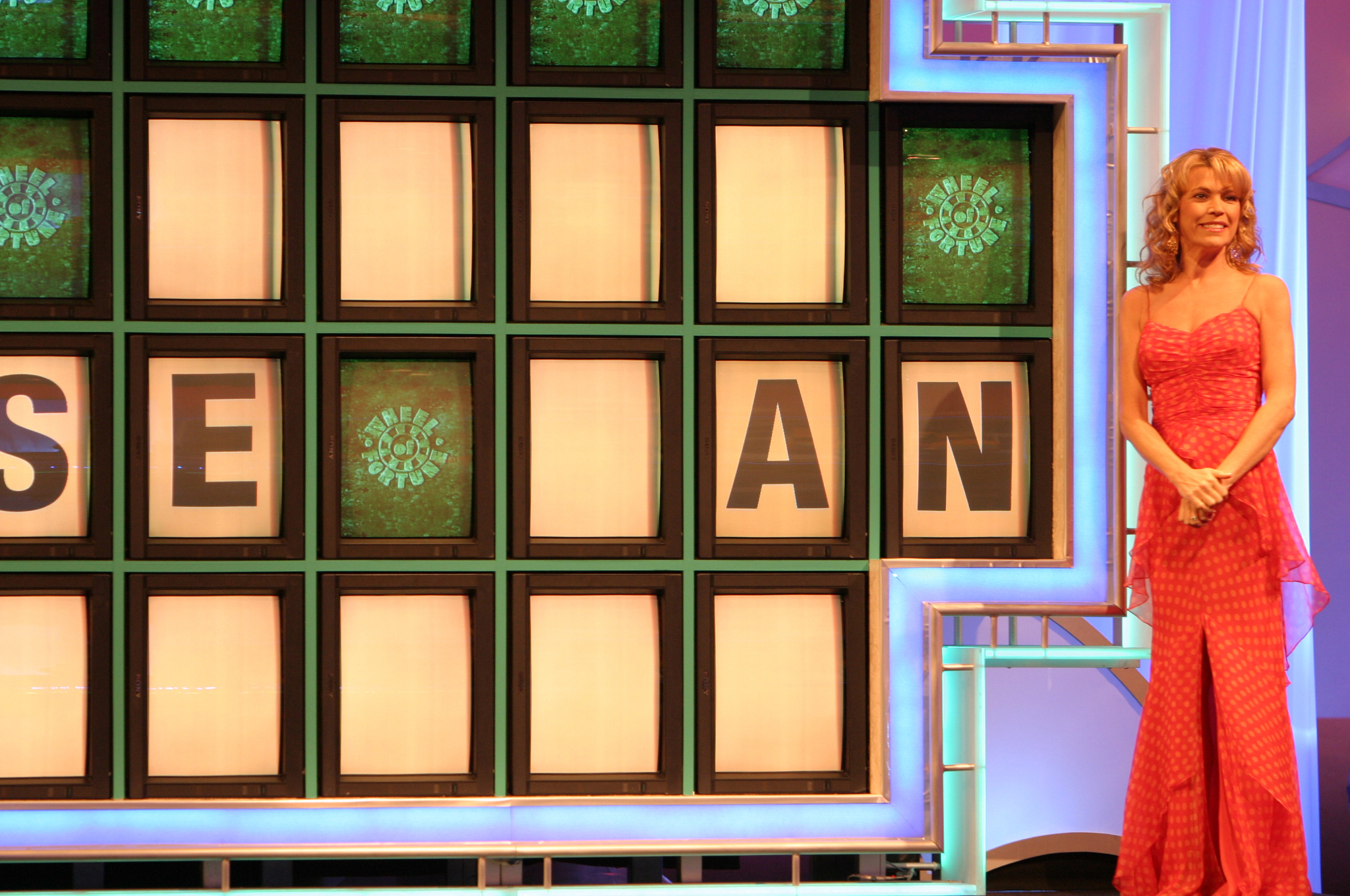
Long running show Wheel of Fortune, with archetypal co-presenter Vanna White

Game shows were the lowest priority of television networks and were rotated out every thirteen weeks if unsuccessful. Most tapes were wiped until the early 1980s. Over the course of the 1980s and early 1990s, as fewer new hits (e.g. Press Your Luck, Sale of the Century, and Card Sharks) were produced, game shows lost their permanent place in the daytime lineup. ABC transitioned out of the daytime game show format in the mid-1980s (briefly returning to the format for one season in 1990 with a Match Game revival). NBC's game block also lasted until 1991, but the network attempted to bring them back in 1993 before cancelling its game show block again in 1994. CBS phased out most of its game shows, except for The Price Is Right, by 1993. To the benefit of the genre, the moves of Wheel of Fortune and a modernized revival of Jeopardy! to syndication in 1983 and 1984, respectively, was and remains highly successful; the two are, to this day, fixtures in the prime time "access period".

Cable television also allowed for the debut of game shows such as Supermarket Sweep and Debt (Lifetime), Trivial Pursuit and Family Challenge (Family Channel), and Double Dare (Nickelodeon). It also opened up a previously underdeveloped market for game show reruns. General interest networks such as CBN Cable Network (forerunner to Freeform) and USA Network had popular blocks for game show reruns from the mid-1980s to the mid-'90s before that niche market was overtaken by Game Show Network in 1994.

In the United Kingdom, game shows have had a more steady and permanent place in the television lineup and never lost popularity in the 1990s as they did in the United States, due in part to the fact that game shows were highly regulated by the Independent Broadcasting Authority in the 1980s and that those restrictions were lifted in the 1990s, allowing for higher-stakes games to be played.

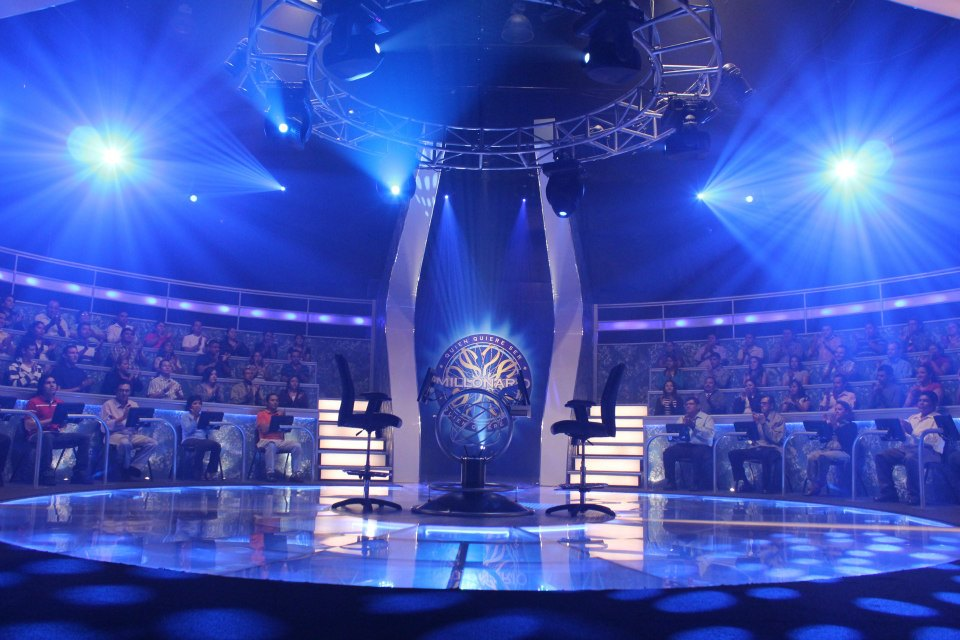
The 1998 British game show Who Wants to Be a Millionaire? went on to be licensed internationally (Salvadoran version pictured).

In September 1998, Who Wants to Be a Millionaire? premiered in the United Kingdom with Chris Tarrant (who served as host until February 2014). It was the first game show in the UK to offer a jackpot of £1,000,000 and became a ratings success as soon as it premiered. This led to Michael Davies, who was at the time a young television producer, pitching the idea to the American Broadcasting Company (ABC) later that year. At the time, ABC was suffering from low ratings across all of its programming, and was on the verge of losing its status as one of the "Big Three" networks. In addition, the popularity of game shows hit a nadir in the mid-1990s United States (at which point The Price Is Right was the only game show still on daytime network television and numerous game shows designed for cable television were canceled).

Davies (who had created the game show Debt for Lifetime Television and Win Ben Stein's Money for Comedy Central) decided to bring the show to the United States, certain that it would save ABC from collapse and revive interest in game shows. At this point, the British game show Who Wants to Be a Millionaire? began distribution around the globe, and upon the show's American debut in 1999, it was a hit and became a regular part of ABC's primetime lineup until 2002; Who Wants to Be a Millionaire would eventually air in syndication until May 2019 before being revived for primetime in April 2020. Several shorter-lived high-stakes games were attempted around the time of the millennium, both in the United States and the United Kingdom, such as Winning Lines, The Chair, Greed, Paranoia, and Shafted, leading to some dubbing this period as "The Million-Dollar Game Show Craze". The boom quickly went bust, as by July 2000, almost all of the imitator million-dollar shows were canceled (one of those exceptions was Winning Lines, which continued to air in the United Kingdom until 2004 even though it was canceled in the United States in early 2000); these higher stakes contests nevertheless opened the door to reality television contests such as Survivor and Big Brother, in which contestants win large sums of money for outlasting their peers in a given environment. Several game shows returned to daytime in syndication during this time as well, such as Family Feud, Hollywood Squares, and Millionaire.

=== 2000s–present ===
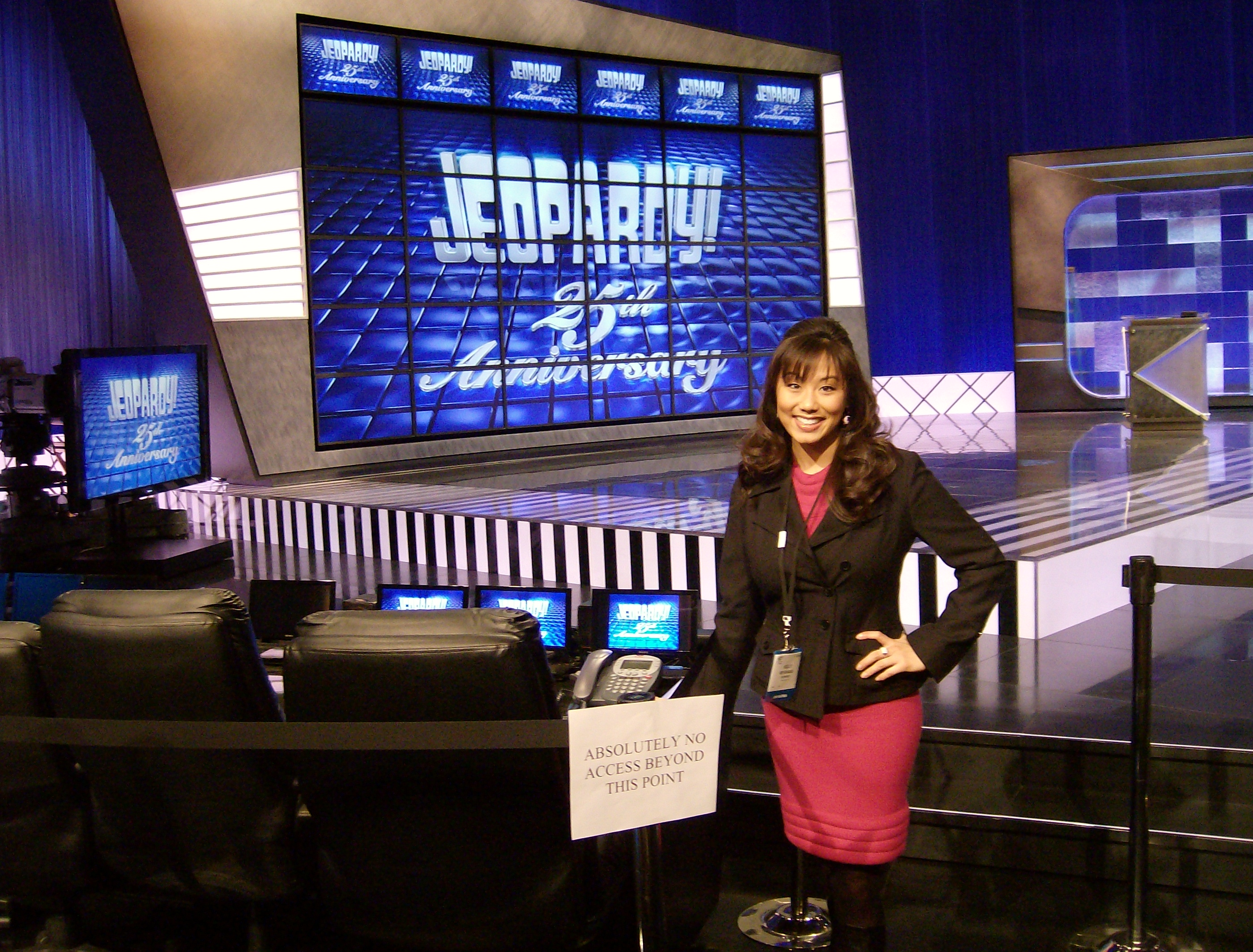
Announcer Kelly Miyahara on the set of US gameshow Jeopardy!, in 2009

Wheel of Fortune, Jeopardy! and Family Feud have continued in syndication. To keep pace with the prime-time quiz shows, Jeopardy! doubled its question values in 2001 and lifted its winnings limit in 2003. Nearing the end of Jeopardy's 20th season, on June 2, 2004, software engineer Ken Jennings of Salt Lake City, Utah became the new champion on Jeopardy!. With no limit to his appearances, Jennings began to break many game show records: On November 3, 2004, Jennings topped Kevin Olmstead's Millionaire winnings with his 65th consecutive win, finishing the day with $45,099 and a new cumulative total of $2,197,000 (equivalent to $3,657,000 in 2024). Olmstead had won $2,180,000 on Who Wants to Be a Millionaire in April 2001 and had been the biggest winner in game show history up until that point.

Jennings won nine more games before his streak came to an end on November 30, 2004, at the hands of contestant Nancy Zerg. He had extended his record total to $2,520,700 at the time of his defeat, after which he was awarded an additional $2,000 for finishing in second place per Jeopardy! rules. Jennings continues to hold the Jeopardy! record for longest winning streak on the show and longest winning streak on any game show in the United States; however, Jennings does not hold the record for longest winning streak worldwide; that record is held by Ian Lygo, who won 75 games on the British game show 100% in 1998 (Lygo holds the record as Jennings appeared on Jeopardy! for 75 days but won 74 games). Jeopardy! has also increased the stakes of its tournaments and put a larger focus on contestants with strong personalities. The show has since produced four more millionaires: tournament winner Brad Rutter and recent champions James Holzhauer, Matt Amodio, and Amy Schneider.

In 2009, actress and comedienne Kim Coles became the first black woman to host a prime-time game show, Pay It Off. Family Feud revived in popularity with a change in tone under host Steve Harvey to include more ribaldry. Harvey became the first black host of Family Feud in July 2010 and has hosted the show ever since.

The rise of digital television in the United States opened up a large market for rerun programs. Buzzr was established by Fremantle, owners of numerous classic U.S. game shows, as a broadcast outlet for its archived holdings in June 2015. There was also a rise of live game shows at festivals and public venues, where the general audience could participate in the show, such as the science-inspired Geek Out Game Show or the Yuck Show.

Since the early 2000s, several game shows were conducted in a tournament format; examples included History IQ, Grand Slam, PokerFace (which never aired in North America), Duel, The Million Second Quiz, 500 Questions, The American Bible Challenge, and Mental Samurai. Most game shows conducted in this manner only lasted for one season.

A boom in prime time revivals of classic daytime game shows began to emerge in the mid-2010s. In 2016, ABC packaged the existing Celebrity Family Feud, which had returned in 2015, with new versions of To Tell the Truth, The $100,000 Pyramid, and Match Game in 2016; new versions of Press Your Luck and Card Sharks would follow in 2019. TBS launched a cannabis-themed revival of The Joker's Wild, hosted by Snoop Dogg, in October 2017. This is in addition to a number of original game concepts that appeared near the same time, including Awake, Deal or No Deal (which originally aired in 2005), Child Support, Hollywood Game Night, 1 vs. 100, Minute to Win It (which originally aired in 2010), The Wall, and a string of music-themed games such as Don't Forget the Lyrics!, The Singing Bee, and Beat Shazam. The game show format staged a comeback on daytime television in the 2020s with new formats such as Flip Side and The Perfect Line, both syndicated through CBS's syndication wing.

== International issues ==
The popularity of game shows in the United States was closely paralleled around the world. Reg Grundy Organisation, for instance, would buy the international rights for American game shows and reproduce them in other countries, especially in Grundy's native Australia. Dutch producer Endemol (later purchased by American companies Disney and Apollo Global Management, then resold to French company Banijay) has created and released numerous game shows and reality television formats popular around the world. Most game show formats that are popular in one country are franchised to others.

Game shows have had an inconsistent place in television in Canada, with most homegrown game shows there being made for the French-speaking Quebec market and the majority of English-language game shows in the country being rebroadcast from, or made with the express intent of export to, the United States. There have been exceptions to this (see, for instance, the long-running Definition). Unlike reality television franchises, international game show franchises generally only see Canadian adaptations in a series of specials, based heavily on the American versions but usually with a Canadian host to allow for Canadian content credits (one of those exceptions was Le Banquier, a Quebec French-language version of Deal or No Deal which aired on TVA from 2008 to 2015). The smaller markets and lower revenue opportunities for Canadian shows in general also affect game shows there, with Canadian games (especially Quebecois ones) often having very low budgets for prizes, unless the series is made for export. Canadian contestants are generally allowed to participate on American game shows, and there have been at least three Canadian game show hosts – Howie Mandel, Monty Hall and Alex Trebek – who have gone on to long careers hosting American series, while Jim Perry, an American host, was prominent as a host of Canadian shows.

American game shows have a tendency to hire stronger contestants than their British or Australian counterparts. Many of the most successful game show contestants in America would likely never be cast in a British or Australian game show for fear of having them dominate the game, according to Mark Labbett, who appeared in all three countries on the game show The Chase. American game shows have historically avoided allowing contestants who have recently appeared on other game shows to appear on a different game without special dispensation; one of the most infamous cases of a contestant bypassing this rule was that of a woman named Barbara, who appeared on as many as eight game shows between 1976 and 1985 using various surnames (including her married name Barbara Vollick, her maiden name Barbara Marquez, and her middle name Barbara Lowe). Barbara's run eventually ended after a successful five-episode streak on Jeopardy!, when staffers had recognized her from her other game show appearances, leading them to disqualify her from later tournament appearances and to erase Barbara's episodes from the show's archives. This has become less of an issue in the 21st century as contestants who became famous on one game are often cast on another to test how they handle the format.

=== Japanese game show ===
The Japanese game show is a distinct format, borrowing heavily from variety formats, physical stunts and athletic competitions. The Japanese style has been adapted overseas (and at one point was parodied with an American reality competition, I Survived a Japanese Game Show, which used a fake Japanese game show as its central conceit).

== Prizes ==
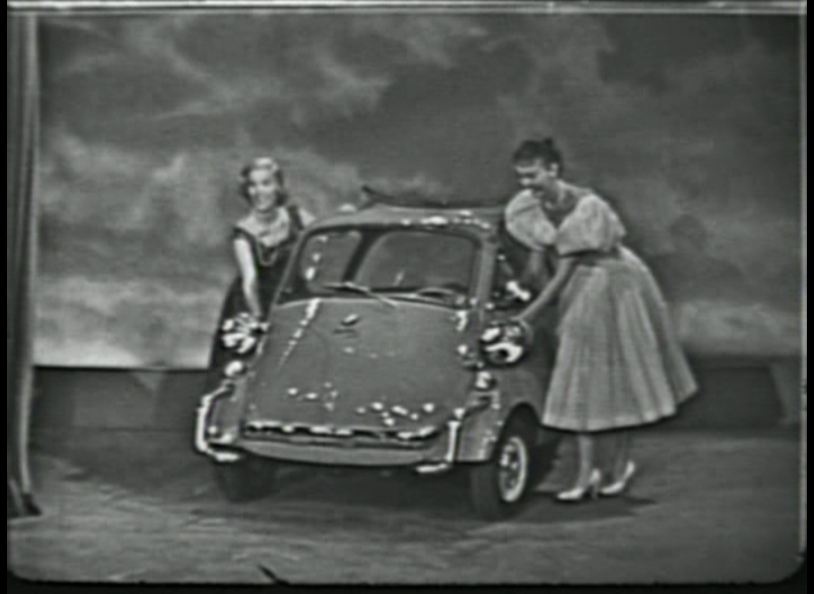
A BMW Isetta being presented as a prize on a 1957 episode of The Price Is Right

Many of the prizes awarded on game shows are provided through product placement, but in some cases they are provided by private organizations or purchased at either the full price or at a discount by the show. There is the widespread use of "promotional consideration", in which a game show receives a subsidy from an advertiser in return for awarding that manufacturer's product as a prize or consolation prize. Some products supplied by manufacturers may not be intended to be awarded and are instead just used as part of the gameplay such as the low-priced items used in several The Price is Right pricing games. Although in this show the smaller items (sometimes even in the single digits of dollars) are awarded as well when the price is correctly guessed, even when a contestant loses the major prize they were playing for.

For high-stakes games, a network may purchase prize indemnity insurance to avoid paying the cost of a rare but expensive prize out of pocket. If the said prize is won too often, the insurance company may refuse to insure a show; this was a factor in the discontinuation of The Price Is Right $1,000,000 Spectacular series of prime-time specials. In April 2008, three of the contestants on The Price Is Right $1,000,000 Spectacular won the top prize in a five-episode span after fifteen episodes without a winner, due in large part to a change in the rules. The insurance companies had made it extremely difficult to get further insurance for the remaining episodes. A network or syndicator may also opt to distribute large cash prizes in the form of an annuity, spreading the cost of the prize out over several years or decades.

From about 1960 through the rest of the 20th century, American networks placed restrictions on the amount of money that could be given away on a game show, in an effort to avoid a repeat of the scandals of the 1950s. This usually took the form of an earnings cap that forced a player to retire once they had won a certain amount of money or a limit on how many episodes, usually five, on which a player could appear on a show. The introduction of syndicated games, particularly in the 1980s, eventually allowed for more valuable prizes and extended runs on a particular show. British television was under even stricter regulations on prizes until the 1990s, seriously restricting the value of prizes that could be given and disallowing games of chance to have an influence on the results of the game. (Thus, the British version of The Price Is Right at first did not include the American version's "Showcase Showdown", in which contestants spun a large wheel to determine who would advance to the Showcase bonus round.) In Canada, prizes were limited not by bureaucracy but necessity, as the much smaller population limited the audience of shows marketed toward that country. The lifting of these restrictions in the 1990s was a major factor in the explosion of high-stakes game shows in the later part of that decade in both the U.S. and Britain and, subsequently, around the world.

== Bonus round ==
A bonus round (also known as a bonus game or an end game) usually follows a main game as a bonus to the winner of that game. In the bonus round, the stakes are higher and the game is considered to be tougher.

The game play of a bonus round usually varies from the standard game play of the front game, and there are often borrowed or related elements of the main game in the bonus round to ensure the entire show has a unified premise. Though some end games are referred to as "bonus rounds", many are not specifically referred to as such in games but fit the same general role. There is no one formula for the format of a bonus round.

Until the 1960s, most game shows did not offer a bonus round. In traditional two-player formats, the winner – if a game show's rules provided for this – became the champion and simply played a new challenger either on the next show or after the commercial break.

One of the earliest forms of bonus rounds was the Jackpot Round of the original series Beat the Clock. After two rounds of performing stunts, the wife of the contestant couple would perform at a jackpot board for a prize. The contestant was shown a famous quotation or common phrase, and the words were scrambled. To win the announced bonus, the contestant had to unscramble the words within 20 seconds. The contestant received a consolation gift worth over $200 if she was unsuccessful.

Another early bonus round ended each episode of You Bet Your Life with the team who won the most money answering one final question for a jackpot which started at $1,000 and increased $500 each week until won.

Another early example was the Lightning Round on the word game Password, starting in 1961. The contestant who won the front game played a quick-fire series of passwords within 60 seconds, netting $50 per correctly guessed word, for a maximum bonus prize of $250.

The bonus round came about after game show producer Mark Goodson was first presented Password, contending that it was not enough to merely guess passwords during the show. "We needed something more, and that's how the Lightning Round was invited," said Howard Felsher, who produced Password and Family Feud. "From that point on every game show had to have an end round. You'd bring a show to a network, and they'd say, 'What's the endgame?' as if they had thought of it themselves."

The audience-match half of the "Super Match", the endgame round from all versions of Match Game since 1973, served as the impetus for Family Feud.

== See also ==
- Game Show Network (American cable television channel dedicated to the format)
- Buzzr (American broadcast network dedicated to the format)
- Challenge (British network dedicated to the format)
- GameTV (Canadian network dedicated to the format)
- UKGameshows.com, British website devoted to reviews and descriptions of game shows
- List of game show hosts
- List of American game shows
- List of international game shows
- Lists of television programs
- Panel show
- Quiz Show
- Reality television
- Daytime television in the United States
- American game show winnings records
- Video games
