= John Carpenter (game show contestant) =

American millionaire (born 1967)

- Born: December 24, 1967 (age 58); Hamden, Connecticut, U.S.
- Education: Rutgers University
- Occupation: Tax collector
- Known for: First top prize winner on Who Wants to Be a Millionaire? franchise

John Carpenter (born December 24, 1967) is an American game show contestant and Internal Revenue Service agent. He is the seventeenth highest-earning American game show contestant of all time. Carpenter is best known for becoming the first top-prize winner on the American version of Who Wants to Be a Millionaire, and the first ever top-prize winner in the entire Who Wants to Be a Millionaire? franchise. He held the record for the largest single win in United States game show history, until it was broken in 2000 by Rahim Oberholtzer who won $1.12 million on another U.S. quiz show, Twenty One.

On the November 19, 1999, episode of Millionaire, Carpenter proceeded to advance to the million-dollar question without using any lifelines. He then used his Phone-a-Friend to call his father, not for help, but rather to tell him he was going to win the game. Carpenter answered the question correctly and became the show's first millionaire. His win gave him national recognition and led to multiple talk show appearances, as well as subsequent appearances on Millionaire.

== Career and family ==
Carpenter was born in Hamden, Connecticut. His father, Tom, worked as a computer program analyst for the Department of Veterans Affairs, while his mother, Gail, served as an administrative assistant for the Massachusetts Audubon Society. In 1986, he enrolled at Rutgers University and graduated in 1990 with a degree in economics. In January 1991, he joined the Internal Revenue Service after completing government exams and tests. In November 1996, Carpenter met his future wife, Deborah, who was studying for a master's degree at Southern Connecticut State University and worked as a manager of a Fleet Bank branch in New Haven. They married in August 1998. At the time of his appearance on Millionaire, he was 31 years old. When he revealed his profession as an IRS officer on Millionaire, Carpenter was playfully booed by the audience. As of 2024, Carpenter continued to work for the IRS.

== Who Wants to Be a Millionaire ==
$1 million (15 of 15) – no time limit

Which of these U.S. Presidents appeared on the television series "Laugh-In"?

1. Lyndon Johnson
2. Richard Nixon(correct answer)
3. Jimmy Carter
4. Gerald Ford

Carpenter was originally uninterested in Millionaire but eventually tuned in one night after dinner while having friends over at his house. When he found the show's higher-tier questions no more difficult than the lower-tier ones, he decided to call in to the show's hotline for a chance to become a contestant. Carpenter answered all of the hotline questions correctly and was on the show within two days.

The host Regis Philbin described Carpenter as having "cruised right through those first fourteen questions," as he had proceeded to reach the final question without using any of his lifelines. The $1 million question was, "Which of these U.S. Presidents appeared on the television series 'Laugh-In'?", with the choices being A) Lyndon Johnson, B) Richard Nixon, C) Jimmy Carter, and D) Gerald Ford. Carpenter used his Phone-A-Friend lifeline to call his father not for help, but rather to inform him that he was going to win the million dollars. Carpenter later said, "I thought I'd look so cocky if I didn't use any lifelines, so I faked it." Ken Jennings and Matt Damon would later use the lifeline to call Brad Rutter on the $1 million question for the same reason, but it was cut due to time constraints. It was later revealed that he actually "helped" them on the extended version of their run.

With his win, Carpenter became the first contestant in the worldwide Millionaire franchise to win the show's top prize. He said that the only question that had flustered him was one which asked for the location of the Gunfight at the O.K. Corral. Carpenter eventually remembered that the film Tombstone included the gunfight, and he replied correctly with the answer 'Tombstone, Arizona'. While taking a vacation after his win, Carpenter considered quitting his job with the IRS, but eventually decided against it. He explained to Kiplinger's Personal Finance that "after the taxes, it's not change-your-life kind of money if you want to eat every day." Carpenter also described the fame as having a bigger impact on his life than the money, later stating: "The money doesn't change your life. What happens afterwards might."

== Later work ==
Shortly after winning on Millionaire, Carpenter played himself in a Saturday Night Live skit. Donald Trump, played by Darrell Hammond, announced that Carpenter would be his running-mate in the presidential election. Afterward, Carpenter pretended to call his father, then shouted, "Live from New York, it's Saturday Night!" Carpenter also appeared on Good Morning America, Oprah Winfrey Show, and Live with Regis and Kathie Lee.

Carpenter appeared as himself in the second half of the fourth season of Oz. He plays a contestant in a fictional TV game show called Up Your Ante that the prisoners in Em City are watching. The show within the show is hosted by Gordon Elliott, with Eartha Kitt and Didi Conn as celebrity participants.

With Rod L. Evans, Carpenter co-authored a trivia book titled Matching Wits With the Million-Dollar Mind: The World's Hardest Trivia Quizzes From America's First Quiz Show Millionaire. The book was published by Berkley Books in 2002.

=== Other game show appearances ===
In 2000, Carpenter appeared in the Who Wants to Be a Millionaire: Champions Edition, in which previous contestants who won $250,000–$1,000,000 played again, with half of their additional winnings from the Champions Edition going to a charity of their choice. Carpenter won $250,000, bringing his total Millionaire winnings to $1,250,000. In 2004, Carpenter participated in Super Millionaire, as one of the "Three Wise Men" on the episode during which Robert "Bob-O" Essig won $1,000,000. He later participated as part of the Mob on NBC's 1 vs. 100 on October 27, 2006, and as a contestant on the Game Show Network game show Grand Slam.

Carpenter appeared on the August 16, 2009, episode of Millionaire in prime time for its tenth anniversary. In the audience with him were his father, his wife, and his son. He was also the first expert in the "Ask the Expert" lifeline for the eighth season of the syndicated series in September 2009. Carpenter again appeared in the audience on the Jimmy Kimmel version of Millionaire on the July 10, 2024 episode to commemorate the show's 25th anniversary.

Honorary titles
Preceded by First Millionaire	Top prize winner on Who Wants to Be a Millionaire (U.S.); November 19, 1999	Succeeded by Dan Blonsky
Preceded by Michael Shutterly	All-time American game show winnings leader 1999–2000	Succeeded by Rahim Oberholtzer
