= American game show winnings records =

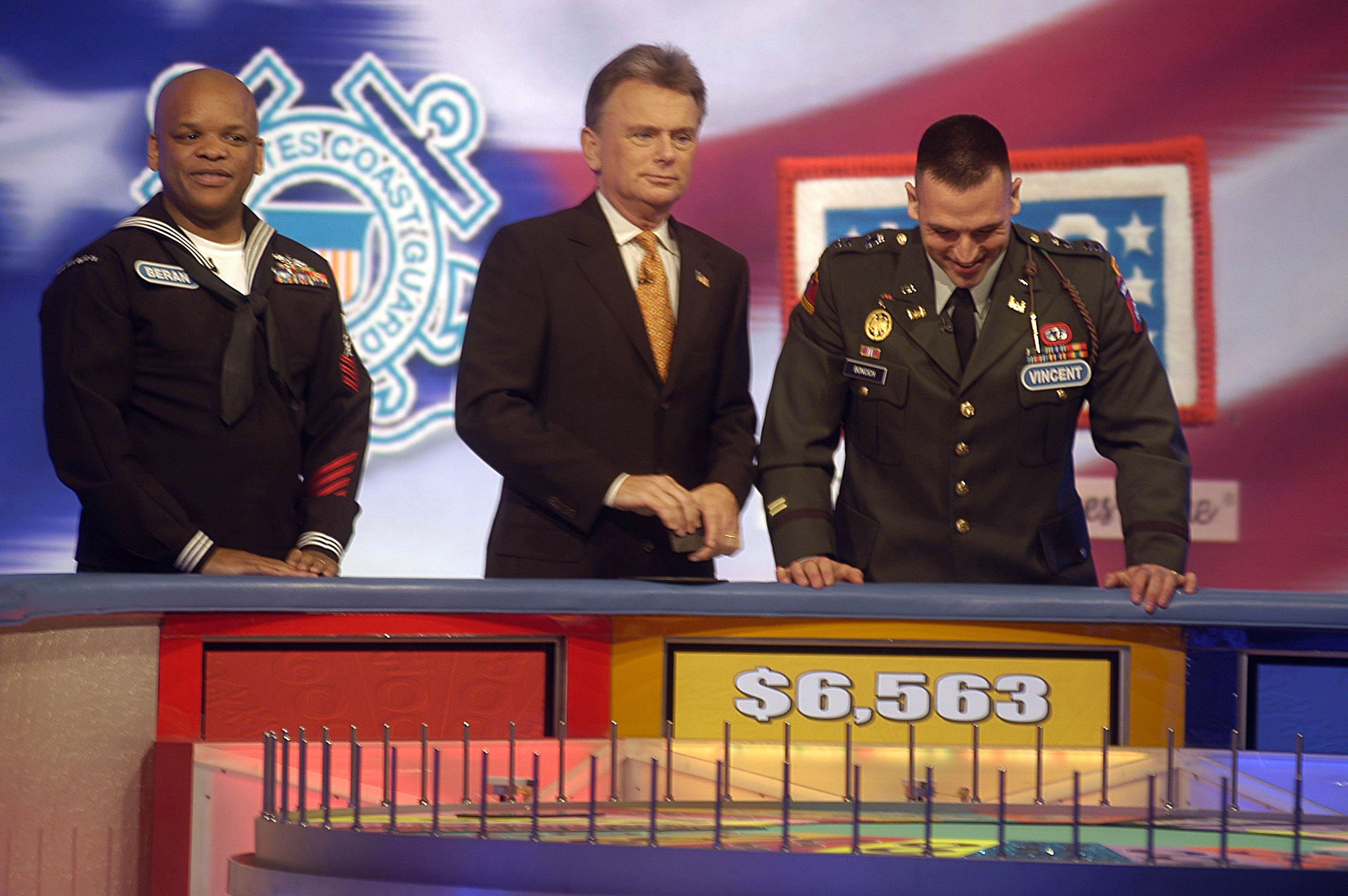
Pat Sajak, former host of Wheel of Fortune (middle) along with two United States Armed Forces contestants (left and right) during Armed Services Week, airing on the week of April 3, 2006.

A game show is a type of radio, television, or streaming program (Note: As it relates to this article, a streaming platform is defined as an American subscription streaming media service owned by a major corporation. Therefore, any money won on game shows streaming exclusively on Netflix, HBO Max, Disney+/Hulu, Amazon Prime, Paramount+, Peacock and Apple TV qualify as a game show. Any money won on social media sites (YouTube, Instagram, Facebook, Twitter, etc.) qualify as reality content, not game shows, and are not to be included on this page.) in which contestants, television personalities or celebrities, sometimes as part of a team, play a game which involves answering trivia questions or solving puzzles, usually for prizes. In a game show, prizes can typically be won in a single match (in some cases, particularly in the ones that offer record-setting prizes, contestants can play multiple matches and accumulate a larger total), though the exact definition of a game show in the modern era is more broad compared to when game shows began in the early 20th century. Jeopardy! is a game show where contestants can continue to play on the show for an unlimited amount of time (as long as they keep winning) and Jeopardy! is, to date, the only trivia-based game show that allows contestants to make unlimited consecutive appearances. Game shows are usually distinguishable from reality television competition shows, in which the competition consumes an entire season of episodes, though some athletic-based shows are exceptions to this rule (see below for more information).

Beginning with the first five-figure and six-figure game show jackpots in the mid-1950s, a succession of contestants on various quiz shows of the era each set records. Teddy Nadler of The $64,000 Challenge, the highest-scoring contestant of the 1950s era, was not surpassed until 1980, when Thom McKee won $312,700 on Tic-Tac-Dough. Between 1999 and 2001, during a brief boom in high-stakes game shows, the record was broken six times. Both the 1955–1958 and 1999–2001 eras of rapidly set and broken records were driven primarily by one-upmanship between the networks each trying to secure bragging rights and ratings by inflating their prize offerings, rather than the merits of the contestants themselves. American daytime television has historically had smaller prize budgets for game shows that air in that daypart.

As of March 2025, the top second through fourth winners in American game show history all earned the majority of their winnings from the quiz show Jeopardy!, which has aired since 1984 and has had no hard earnings limit since 2003. Ken Jennings is the second highest-earning American game show contestant of all time, having accumulated a total of $5,796,214 as of July 2025. Jennings took his record back from Brad Rutter as the highest-earning contestant (a record Rutter had held since 2014) by virtue of his victory on January 14, 2020, in the Jeopardy! The Greatest of All Time tournament.

On March 25, 2025, David Genat, an Australian model and television personality, surpassed both Jennings and Rutter and became the highest-earning contestant on a single American game show, after winning $5,800,000 on the second-season finale of Deal or No Deal Island. Deal or No Deal Island is a hybrid format combining the existing game Deal or No Deal with an elimination reality competition.

== Daytime game shows ==
Most daytime game show top prizes were limited to $25,000 during the 1960s and 1970s, a restriction made for both budgetary concerns and to assuage criticism that arose from the 1950s quiz show scandals. The limits were usually imposed by the networks themselves; CBS, for example, had a limit of $25,000 that increased during the 1980s up to $125,000 during the 1990s. In 1975, ABC also imposed a limit of $30,000 which was eventually dropped by 1977. NBC, however, opted not to employ such a limit and allowed show producers to set them if they saw fit.

=== Single day record ===
The single day record for shows in daytime television was set in 1984 by Michael Larson, who won $110,237 (equivalent to $342,000 in 2025) on Press Your Luck. Larson achieved this record by memorizing the show's board patterns, repeatedly hitting the board's squares that awarded contestants money and an additional spin, which would, in turn, replace the spin he had just used, effectively allowing him to spin the board in the second round as long as he wanted. Because of this, his game had to be split into two episodes (which aired June 8 and June 11), as his turn caused the game to go well over the show's half-hour allotted time. At the time of the show's airing, CBS only allowed contestants to win up to $50,000 on a game show (contestants would retire after winning $25,000); the winnings limit increased to $75,000 in November and $100,000 in 1986 (and later $125,000 by 1990) before being permanently eliminated in 2006. In March 2003, Game Show Network produced a documentary about the event featuring Ed Long and Janie Litras-Dakan, the contestants Larson handily defeated in 1984.

In 2006, Vickyann Chrobak-Sadowski set a new record by winning $147,517 on the 35th-season premiere of The Price Is Right, winning a Dodge Caravan playing "Push Over", a $1,000 cash bonus in the Showcase Showdown, and both showcases, one of which included a Dodge Viper. In 2013, Chrobak-Sadowski was succeeded by Sheree Heil, who set the record by winning $170,345 on The Price Is Right "Best of 2013" special aired December 30, 2013 by winning an Audi R8 playing "Gas Money", $10,000 cash and Prada shoes. In 2016, Heil was succeeded by Christen Freeman, who set the record by winning $210,000 on October 28, during the show's "Big Money Week" special. As Cliff Hangers was the episode's Big Money game, game rules were modified to offer a top prize of $250,000, which was reduced by $10,000 for every step the mountain climber took. In addition to her One Bid prize and an additional $1,000 won during the Showcase Showdown, Freeman's grand total was $212,879, setting a new daytime record.

The current single-day record holder is Michael Stouber, who won a total of $262,743 on the October 14, 2019, episode of The Price Is Right. Stouber's appearance occurred during a special "Big Money Week" promotion in which games normally played for standard prizes had increased values or special cash awards offered. Stouber played the pricing game Plinko, normally played for a top prize of $50,000. On this special episode, the top prize was increased to $1,000,000, with the middle slot's value increased from $10,000 to $200,000. Stouber won a total of $202,000 during the game, plus his showcase and an accumulating jackpot of prizes (worth $29,657).

== Overall winnings record ==
=== 1955–1958 ===
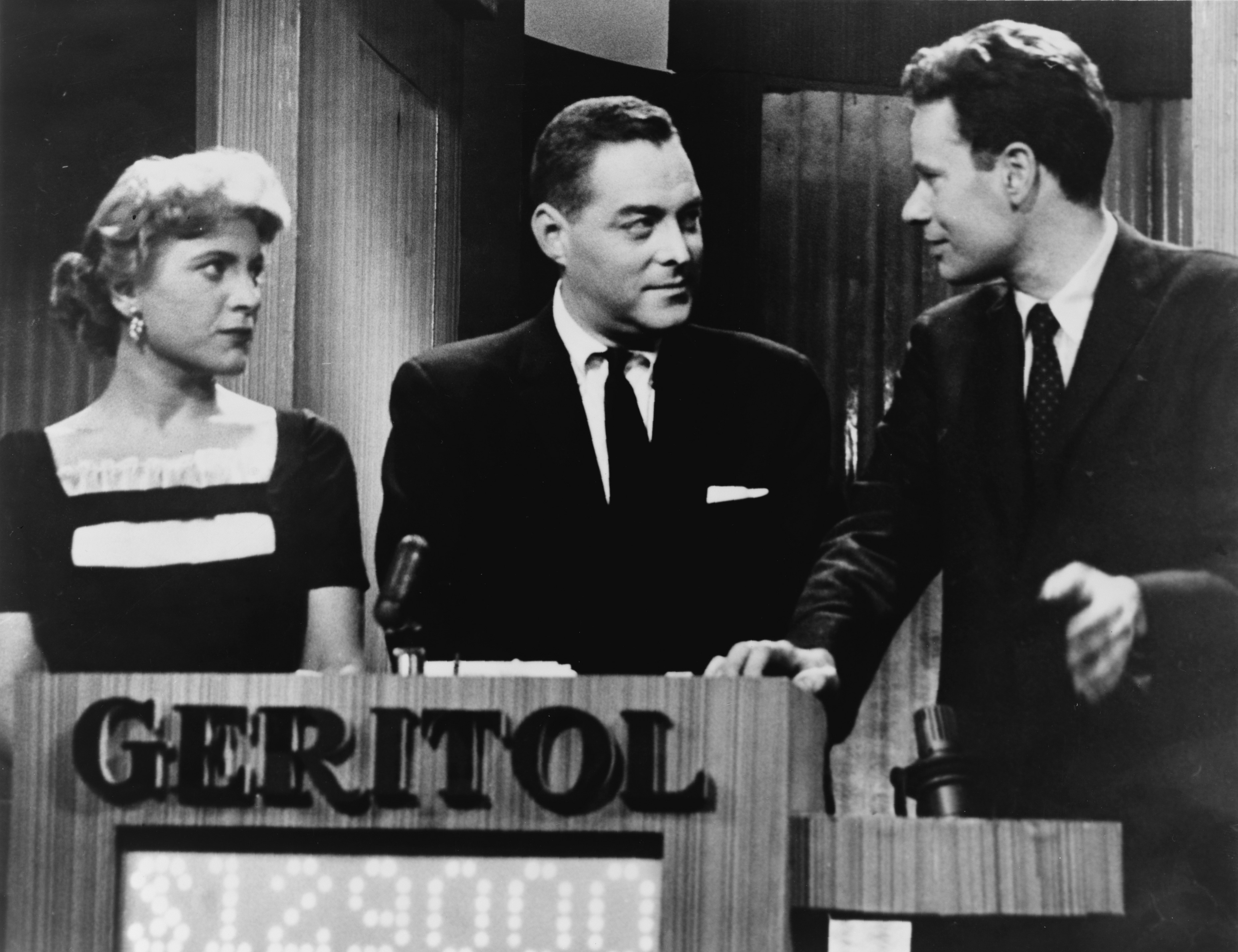
Twenty One host Jack Barry (center) with contestant Charles Van Doren (right) and fellow contestant Vivienne Nearing (left)

During the early quiz show boom of the mid-1950s, Richard McCutcheon set the first major winnings record by winning the title prize on The $64,000 Question on September 13, 1955, matched shortly thereafter by Joyce Brothers on December 3, despite producers attempting to give her questions they thought she could not answer. Ethel Park Richardson set the next winnings record of $100,000 on The Big Surprise on December 10.

Richardson's record would stand for more than a year, before being surpassed by Charles Van Doren on January 21, 1957, who was playing Twenty One. Van Doren, who won $129,000 total, was almost immediately passed by on February 10 by 11-year-old Leonard Ross. Ross, through earlier winnings on The Big Surprise and a new appearance on The $64,000 Question, reached $164,000. Ross's total was surpassed by ten-year-old Robert Strom, on The $64,000 Question on April 16. Strom would go on to win $242,600 in various game show appearances by mid-1958. Finally, Teddy Nadler collected winnings on The $64,000 Question and The $64,000 Challenge through 1957 and 1958 sufficient to eclipse Strom's winnings on August 24, 1958, on the way to $264,000 (equivalent to $2,946,000 in 2025).

=== 1950s quiz show scandals ===
Nadler's record would stand for more than two decades, because in the fall of 1958, allegations that many big-money quiz shows were fixed were corroborated; several of the programs under scrutiny were almost immediately cancelled. Herb Stempel, who had won $49,500 on Twenty One, openly admitted that his defeat by Charles Van Doren had been scripted. Van Doren, by comparison, insisted he had wanted to do the show honestly and refused to speak on the topic for decades afterward, until writing an essay on the subject for The New Yorker in 2008. Joyce Brothers's winnings, which added up to $128,000 after a follow-up win on The $64,000 Challenge, were ultimately upheld as legitimate, and she went on to a prolonged career as a psychologist and media personality. Nadler, a middle-school dropout, failed a civil service exam trying to get a temporary job with the United States Census Bureau in 1960. His breadth of knowledge was never questioned; Nadler was not implicated for any role in the quiz show scandals. In a 1970 Nadler interview and article, people connected with the shows Nadler was on stated that he "had been shown some questions before air time, but it didn't matter when he saw them – he knew the answers anyway." Nadler died on May 23, 1984, at the age of 74.

The quiz show scandals caused sweeping changes in television game show production. These changes, which lasted decades, included the imposition of limits on future prize amounts, limits on the number of times game champions could return, and a change in emphasis in most game shows away from "recall of factual knowledge" as the means to win. As with much programming of the early 1960s, game shows of the era were criticized for dumbing down; Let's Make a Deal, a breakout hit game show that debuted in 1963, was belittled as "mindless" and "demeaning to traders and audiences alike". The establishment of the original version of Jeopardy!, with its low stakes (no contestant won more than $12,000 including tournament play during the show's original 11-year daytime run) and five-game limit, helped ease the stigma against the quiz show.

=== 1980s ===
A reboot of Tic-Tac-Dough, which by 1980 was running in syndication, did allow its returning champion to play until defeated, and had no winnings cap. When Tic-Tac-Dough games ended in ties, potential game winnings would carry over to the next game, and both champion and challenger would return. With this play structure, U.S. Naval officer Thom McKee began a winning streak on Tic-Tac-Dough that carried from the spring of 1980 into the 1980–1981 season. McKee passed Nadler's record in tapings recorded over the summer of that year as revealed in a leak to the press. McKee won $312,700 (equivalent to $1,222,000 in 2025) in cash and prizes in 43 games, which included eight cars (on Tic-Tac-Dough a contestant received a new car after every fifth game won). McKee's record on Tic-Tac-Dough was not surpassed by another player, and this was in part because when WCBS-TV in New York purchased the right to air the syndicated Tic-Tac-Dough in 1983, CBS (the station's owner) realized that airing a game show without a winnings cap on a station it owned was a violation of its own Broadcast Standards and Practices. CBS requested to the producers of Tic-Tac-Dough that a winnings limit of $50,000 be imposed, and the show complied with this request.

While Thom McKee was the biggest solo game show winner until 1999, nine couples on The $1,000,000 Chance of a Lifetime shared the show's top prize of $1,000,000 awarded in a combination of prizes and a long-term annuity, during that show's run in syndication from January 1986 to May 1987.

=== 1999–2004: Million-dollar game shows ===
In 1999, McKee's winnings total was passed by Michael Shutterly, who became the biggest winner in the first season of Who Wants to Be a Millionaire in the United States. Shutterly was the first contestant on the show to get to the 15th and final question but elected to walk instead with $500,000 which made him the biggest winner in American game show history at the time. Shutterly had previously won $49,200 as a four-day champion on Jeopardy! in 1988, making his career winnings total $549,200. On November 19, during the second season of Millionaire in the United States, the show crowned its first million-dollar winner, as well as the entire franchise's first top prize winner, when John Carpenter won the show's top prize without using any lifelines, save for a phone call on the final question, which he used to inform his father that he was going to win the million dollars. After Carpenter answered the final question, which concerned Richard Nixon's appearance on Laugh-In in 1968, host Regis Philbin proclaimed Carpenter the show's (and worldwide format's) first top-prize winner. Carpenter's record remained intact until the following year.

The ratings success of Millionaire sparked a brief glut of high-stakes game shows from the other networks, each attempting to outdo the other. In early 2000, Rahim Oberholtzer, a contestant on the revival of NBC's Twenty One, won four games in his appearances on the show, along with $120,000 in the show's "Perfect 21" bonus round, for a total of $1,120,000. For surpassing Carpenter's mark, then-host Maury Povich proclaimed Oberholtzer "the TV Game Show King".

Dan Avila notably appeared as a contestant on the Fox game show Greed on November 18, 1999 (the night before John Carpenter won $1,000,000 on Who Wants to Be a Millionaire) and became the first contestant in game show history to face a question worth more than $1,000,000. Avila reached the jackpot question, which was worth $2,200,000, and had to name the four most recognizable smells to the human nose, which are peanut butter, coffee, Vicks VapoRub and chocolate. He correctly guessed peanut butter, coffee, and Vicks VapoRub, but guessed tuna instead of chocolate, causing him to miss the jackpot by only one answer. He would ultimately leave empty-handed (had Avila chosen all four correct answers, he would have won $2,200,000 and held the record of biggest game show winner until Ken Jennings' 74-day run on Jeopardy! in 2004). Avila reappeared on the show on February 29, 2000, for a Million Dollar Moment special and faced a $1,000,000 question; Avila was asked to correctly select the four well-known U.S. cities that had attracted the most overseas tourists in 1999, according to the U.S. Commerce Department, which that year were Los Angeles, New York City, Orlando and Miami. Avila made Los Angeles, New York City, Orlando and Las Vegas his selections, and once again, he correctly answered three out of four but missed the jackpot by one answer, choosing Las Vegas instead of Miami, and therefore went home empty-handed again. Had Avila correctly answered both of his jackpot questions (along with his total winnings on several other game shows) he would have had a total of $3,309,500 to his name, placing him as the fifth-highest scoring game show contestant in history; instead, his overall winnings stand at $109,500.

Late in its run, Greed brought back some of its previous winners to try for an extra $1,000,000. Curtis Warren, who was part of the first team to win $1,000,000 on the show (of which his share was $400,000, plus $10,000 for winning a terminator round), was one of the contestants brought back to do so on February 11, 2000.

Warren was given a question about TV shows that had been made into movies, with eight choices (of which he had to identify the four correct answers). He successfully did so, giving himself $1,410,000 and the record for the time being. Warren's record was even shorter lived than Oberholtzer's had been, lasting only four days. Three days before Warren's win, David Legler, who also appeared on Twenty One, began a run as champion on the show. Four days after Warren's win, the run continued, with Legler having earned a grand total of $1,765,000 in six wins to surpass Warren's record and become the third contestant in two months to top $1,000,000 on a game show.

Legler held the record for well over a year, outlasting Twenty One and Greed themselves; by July 2000, the million-dollar game show boom had gone bust and both Greed and Twenty One (along with several others) were cancelled, leaving Millionaire as the last surviving million-dollar game show on American television from that boom; it would not be until April 2001 (with the arrival of the similarly short-lived Weakest Link) that another would be attempted. By the start of 2001, the producers of Millionaire decided that it had been too long (71 episodes over a five-month period) since their top prize had been won and instituted an accumulating jackpot which added $10,000 to the grand prize amount for each episode it was not won. Kevin Olmstead claimed the top prize on April 10, 2001, winning a jackpot of $2,180,000. Olmstead became the first contestant to top $2,000,000 in total winnings on a game show and surpassed Legler as the all-time leader.

=== 2003–2020: The Jeopardy! multimillionaires ===
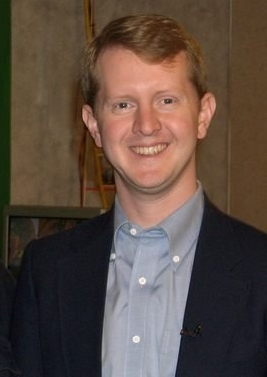
Ken Jennings previously held the highest all-time game show winnings record.

A rule change imposed by Jeopardy! for Season 20 (which ran from September 2003 to July 2004) set the stage for a new generation of game show winnings records. For Season 20, the show eliminated its long-standing rule limiting a champion's consecutive wins to five. In doing so, Jeopardy! joined Tic-Tac-Dough from two decades earlier in allowing unlimited appearances by a returning champion on a quiz show. This set up the potential for winning streaks like those seen in the big-money 1950s quiz shows.

On October 15, 2003, a month into the new season, Pennsylvania college student Sean Ryan became the first champion to play (and win) a sixth game. On January 14, 2004, Tom Walsh became the first seven-game winner.

In February 2004, ABC launched an ultra high-stakes version of Millionaire entitled Who Wants to Be a Super Millionaire? with a $10,000,000 top prize. Two separate Super Millionaire? series aired, one in February 2004 and a second in May 2004. However, despite the higher stakes and the potential for someone to top the all-time record for winnings, the largest prize awarded was $1,000,000, won by Robert Essig on February 23, 2004.

Nearing the end of Jeopardy's 20th season, on June 2, 2004, software engineer Ken Jennings of Salt Lake City, Utah became the new champion on Jeopardy! The episode was the first in a long winning streak for Jennings, first breaking Ryan's and Walsh's accomplishments. With no limit to his appearances, Jennings began to break many game show records. As his streak continued into the 21st season, Jennings was inching closer and closer to Olmstead's all-time record. On November 3, 2004, Jennings topped Olmstead's Millionaire winnings with his 65th consecutive win, finishing the day with $45,099 and a new cumulative total of $2,197,000 (equivalent to $3,745,000 in 2025). Jennings won nine more games before his streak came to an end on November 30, 2004, at the hands of contestant Nancy Zerg. He had extended his record total to $2,520,700 at the time of his defeat, after which he was awarded an additional $2,000 for finishing in second place per Jeopardy! rules. Jennings continues to hold the Jeopardy! record for longest winning streak on the show and longest winning streak on any game show in the United States; however, Jennings does not hold the record for longest winning streak worldwide, that record is held by Ian Lygo who won 75 games on the British game show 100% in 1998 (Lygo holds the record as Jennings appeared on Jeopardy! for 75 days but won 74 games).

Shortly after Jennings's defeat, Jeopardy! decided to see how he would fare in tournament play. On February 9, 2005, the show launched its Ultimate Tournament of Champions, inviting back 144 other past champions to compete over the next three months in a five-round single-elimination tournament with a $2,000,000 grand prize. The field included the highest-winning five-time champions and winners of some previous tournaments, though not all invitees were able to participate. Jennings received a bye into the finals of the tournament, where he faced semi-final winners Jerome Vered and Brad Rutter in a three-game, cumulative total match. Vered had set a single-day scoring record during his appearance on the show in 1992, while Rutter had won the 2001 Tournament of Champions and the 2002 Million Dollar Masters tournament and was the show's highest-earning contestant of all-time before Jennings. In the tournament's three-day final, Rutter defeated Jennings and Vered to win the tournament and $2,000,000, supplanting Jennings as the all-time highest earning American game show contestant in the process. Including the $1.27 million he had won in his previous Jeopardy! appearances (five regular season games, a Tournament of Champions win, the Million Dollar Masters win, and three matches in the earlier rounds of the Ultimate Tournament of Champions which were worth $115,000), Rutter's total stood at $3,270,102, while Jennings was now second with $3,022,700 having gained an additional $500,000 for his second-place finish in the tournament. Jennings slowly began to chip away at Rutter's record, first by winning $714.29 in 2006 as part of the Mob on NBC's 1 vs. 100. A year later, Jennings won the Grand Slam tournament on Game Show Network and the $100,000 top prize by defeating Ogi Ogas in the final round.

In September 2008, Wheel of Fortune increased its top prize to $1,000,000, making it the second syndicated game show to have a top prize of that value. To date, five contestants (four in the regular version and one in Celebrity Wheel of Fortune) have won Wheel's million-dollar prize, with the most recent win occurring on September 30, 2025, in the regular version, which was won by Christina Derevjanik, and October 17, 2021, in Celebrity Wheel of Fortune, which was won by Melissa Joan Hart.

On October 10, 2008, Jennings passed Rutter by winning $500,000 on Are You Smarter Than a 5th Grader?; he extended the record by winning $300,000 in The IBM Challenge, where he and Rutter took on IBM supercomputer Watson in a special Jeopardy! event in 2011. Rutter won $200,000 in the challenge, in which both he and Jennings pledged half of their winnings to charity. Rutter then added $100,000 more when he appeared on Million Dollar Mind Game, raising his total to $3,570,102, second only to Jennings's $3,923,414.29.

NBC's The Million Second Quiz artificially inflated its grand prize to allow for Andrew Kravis, the winner of the ten-day tournament, to claim a record for most money won on a single game show in regular play. Kravis had only won $2,326,346 during actual play ($326,346 during the game, plus the $2,000,000 grand prize) but was awarded $2,600,000 solely so the show could lay claim to the record. Factoring overall winnings, which includes a $50,500 win on Wheel of Fortune and two consolation prizes for losing on Jeopardy! and Who Wants to Be a Millionaire, Kravis's total sits in fourth as of 2024.

In 2014, Jennings and Rutter were both invited to play in the Jeopardy! Battle of the Decades, a tournament conducted by the producers of Jeopardy! to celebrate its thirtieth season in syndication. Both men advanced to the two-day tournament final with Roger Craig (who had set the previous single-day winnings record of $77,000 in 2010) filling the third position. Needing a win to reclaim his record, Rutter took the top prize in the tournament after Jennings, who needed to answer the second day's Final Jeopardy clue correctly to win (after making a sufficient wager), failed to do so. Rutter won the top prize of $1,000,000 while Jennings won the $100,000-second prize. Jennings appeared on Millionaire in November 2014 and won $100,000, missing out on his opportunity to surpass Rutter's record if he could have won the grand prize. He was then a contestant on the ABC primetime show 500 Questions in 2016; however, as he only lasted four questions, he was unable to add to his total. Both Jennings and Rutter competed in the Jeopardy! All-Star Games in 2019. Under the format of that tournament, teams of three competed in a relay to win a $1,000,000 top prize split between them. Thus, either Jennings or Rutter would be able to add up to $333,333.33 to their total as captain of their respective team if they won. It would not have been enough for Jennings to surpass Rutter. But it was Rutter's team who won the tournament, with Jennings's team finishing second and splitting $300,000.

A month after the Jeopardy! All-Star Games came to an end, James Holzhauer became the new Jeopardy! champion. The episode, which was broadcast on April 4, 2019, was the first in a 32-game winning streak where he joined Jennings and Rutter as the only contestants in Jeopardy! history to win at least $1,000,000 (as of April 23, 2019) and $2,000,000 (as of May 24, 2019). He also surpassed Roger Craig's Jeopardy! single-day winnings (on multiple occasions), pushing the record to $131,127 on the episode broadcast on April 17, 2019. Holzhauer ultimately won $2,464,216 during his Jeopardy! run, plus an additional $250,000 for winning the Tournament of Champions, which combined with his prize of $58,333.33 from his appearance on The Chase in 2014, places him fourth in total game show earnings.

Who Wants to Be a Millionaire ended its syndicated run in May 2019 after seventeen seasons; at the time it ended, it had not awarded the top prize in regular play since Nancy Christy became the first woman to top $1,000,000 in overall winnings in May 2003, making her the last million-dollar winner in the history of the syndicated series (not including Sam Murray's million-dollar win on the Million Dollar Tournament of Ten in November 2009). Millionaire would return to primetime in April 2020 with new host Jimmy Kimmel replacing Regis Philbin, who is also taking the role as co-executive producer.

In January 2020, Jennings, Holzhauer, and Rutter all were invited back to Jeopardy! for The Greatest of All Time, a special multi-game prime time miniseries on ABC that carried a minimum $250,000 appearance fee and a $1,000,000 top prize. In the series of two-legged ties, in which the first to win three such ties won the competition, Jennings (3) defeated Holzhauer (1) and Rutter (0), to win the top prize and reclaim the overall American game show earnings lead at the time.

=== 2023–present: Modern-day records ===
In June 2023, Vance Walker first appeared on American Ninja Warrior after having initially appeared on its spinoff show, American Ninja Warrior Junior, during its first season. Walker would go on to win the $1,000,000 top prize on September 11, 2023, after completing the final challenge, Mt. Midoriyama, in 26.75 seconds.

On February 26, 2024, Deal or No Deal Island premiered. Deal or No Deal Island is a show with a progressive jackpot where each episode adds money to the final case in the season finale. After winning the second season on March 25, 2025, David Genat earned the right to play a high stakes game of Deal or No Deal, in which he surpassed Ken Jennings’ record by accepting a deal of $5,800,000 out of a possible $12,232,001, making Genat the biggest game show winner in television history.

In June 2024, Vance Walker once again competed on American Ninja Warrior for a second chance at winning the top prize, this was possible as American Ninja Warrior is an annual tournament where players make repeat appearances (unlike most other game shows where a contestant can only appear once). Unlike Jeopardy! where a contestant can stay on the show as long as they keep winning, contestants on American Ninja Warrior must requalify through tryouts or special invitations to re-appear on a new season of the show. On September 9, 2024, Walker once again won the $1,000,000 top prize after again successfully climbing Mt. Midoriyama. Walker and Yogesh Raut are the only contestants in game show history to win the top prize twice on the same show (Raut had initially won the 2024 Jeopardy! Tournament of Champions, and in 2025 won Jeopardy! Masters, an invitational tournament for Jeopardy!'s top players; Raut would defend his title in 2026).

Million-dollar game shows continue to air, in somewhat lower frequency, into the present day, as several other game shows with prizes in excess of $1,000,000 have come and gone (including Howie Mandel-hosted Deal or No Deal, which aired from 2005 to 2010 and again from 2018 to 2019). After having gone into hiatus in March 2021, Who Wants to Be a Millionaire returned with Kimmel in July 2024 and has aired continuously since then, allowing Ike Barinholtz, who won $1,000,000 alongside his father Alan on August 14, 2024, to ascend to the eleventh position on the winnings list.

== All-time top 25 winnings list ==
Rank	Name	Total winnings (in USD) (Note: For the purposes of this article, a traditional game show is defined as a radio, television, or streaming contest in which prizes can be won within a single episode through objective completion of tasks and not through fan or contestant votes. Therefore, the $10,000,000 prize won by Jeffrey Randall Allen in Beast Games, the $5,000,000 prize Melanie Amaro and Tate Stevens both won on The X Factor, the $4,560,000 prize won by Mai Whelan on Squid Game: The Challenge, and Parvati Shallow's, Sandra Diaz-Twine's and Tony Vlachos's two wins from Survivor and Australian Survivor are not included in this list due to the use of voting. Weakest Link, however, is an exception to this rule as the show also features trivia and contestants must objectively work their way to the jackpot within one single episode, which fits the definition of a game show (Weakest Link is a major gray area in this regard). Additionally, as listed above, shows on YouTube channels or any other means of social media count as reality content and not a game show.) (Note: This list only includes game shows broadcast nationally. As such, all otherwise eligible prizes from The Big Spin (while contestants could win up to $15,220,000, the show only aired in and around the state of California) and regionally televised game shows do not count.) (Note: The following game shows are excluded from the traditional rules: American Ninja Warrior, Deal or No Deal Island, Double Dare, Holey Moley, Jeopardy!, Legends of the Hidden Temple, Let's Make a Deal, Minute to Win It, The Amazing Race, The Price is Right and Wipeout. On Jeopardy!, contestants can continue to play the game as long as they keep winning; Let's Make a Deal and The Price is Right are strategy-based games; on Let's Make a Deal, contestants must decide on the best deal to take by the host, while on The Price is Right, contestants must guess the amounts of the prizes presented to them; Deal or No Deal Island, Double Dare and Legends of the Hidden Temple are a combination of a traditional game show and reality competition, and the others are athletically-based competition shows that require contestants to complete a series of tasks to advance, and also do not use any voting system to determine an outcome (unlike Survivor and most other reality competition shows).) (Note: Unless otherwise stated, winnings for teams with multiple players are divided equally (example: Ken Jennings and Matt Damon's million-dollar prize on Who Wants to Be a Millionaire was split and each received a check for $500,000). Since the money would be divided, the team would have to win more than $2.1 million for their names to appear on this list (as of November 2025). All money values are rounded to the nearest whole dollar. All winnings for charities as well as celebrity appearances are included in this list.)	Show(s)	Notes
1	David Genat	$5,800,000	Deal or No Deal Island, $5,800,000	Genat won the second season of Deal or No Deal Island on March 25, 2025, earning the right to play a high-stakes game of Deal or No Deal, winning $5,800,000 and surpassing the all-time American game show winnings record held by Jennings.
2	Ken Jennings	$5,796,214	Jeopardy!, $3,522,700	Jennings won $2,522,700 in his original 75-episode run on Jeopardy!; $500,000 for his second-place finish in the Ultimate Tournament of Champions; $300,000 in the 2011 IBM Challenge; $100,000 for finishing second in the Battle of the Decades; and $100,000 for finishing second in the 2019 Jeopardy! All-Star Games as a portion of a $300,000 cash winnings split between Jennings and his teammates Monica Thieu and Matt Jackson. In 2020, he won the Jeopardy! The Greatest of All Time tournament, where he won $1,000,000. In addition to his appearances on other shows, Jennings also competed on 500 Questions in 2016; however, he did not add to his total, lasting only four questions. Jennings also appeared on a primetime Celebrity Wheel of Fortune special, winning $72,800 on behalf of his charity, the Equal Justice Initiative. He later won $1,000,000 for Water.org on Who Wants to Be a Millionaire on July 30, 2025, alongside Matt Damon after he won $100,000 on November 17, 2014.
2	Ken Jennings	$5,796,214	Jeopardy! The Greatest of All Time, $1,000,000	
2	Ken Jennings	$5,796,214	Who Wants to Be a Millionaire, $600,000 (Note: Jennings' total includes his $100,000 individual prize from his 2014 appearance on the show and half of the $1,000,000 prize ($500,000) from his 2025 appearance playing alongside Matt Damon.)	
2	Ken Jennings	$5,796,214	Are You Smarter than a 5th Grader?, $500,000	
2	Ken Jennings	$5,796,214	Grand Slam, $100,000	
2	Ken Jennings	$5,796,214	Celebrity Wheel of Fortune, $72,800	
2	Ken Jennings	$5,796,214	1 vs. 100, $714.29	
3	Brad Rutter	$5,168,436	Jeopardy!, $4,803,436	Rutter's total includes his $55,102 in cash winnings from his initial 5-game appearance on Jeopardy! in 2000; $100,000 for winning the Tournament of Champions in 2001; $1,000,000 for winning the Million Dollar Masters tournament in 2002; $2,115,000 for winning the Ultimate Tournament of Champions in 2005; $200,000 for finishing third in the IBM Challenge in 2011; $1,000,000 for winning the Battle of the Decades in 2014; $333,334 for winning the All-Star Games in 2019 (as a portion of a $1,000,000 cash winnings split between Rutter and his teammates David Madden and Larissa Kelly); $250,000 for finishing third in the Greatest of All Time tournament in 2020; and $15,000 for finishing seventh in the Masters Tournament in 2025. The $100,000 that he won on Million Dollar Mind Game in 2011 was a portion of a $600,000 prize that was split between six contestants.
3	Brad Rutter	$5,168,436	Jeopardy! The Greatest of All Time, $250,000	
3	Brad Rutter	$5,168,436	Jeopardy! Masters, $15,000	
3	Brad Rutter	$5,168,436	Million Dollar Mind Game, $100,000	
4	James Holzhauer	$3,772,549	Jeopardy!, $2,714,216	Holzhauer won $2,464,216 in his 33-episode run on the daily Jeopardy! in 2019, $58,484 short of matching Jennings' record for regular (non-tournament) winnings on that show, and won the 2019 Tournament of Champions' $250,000 grand prize. He also received $250,000 for participating in the 2020 Jeopardy! "Greatest of All Time" tournament; $600,000 ($500,000 for himself and $100,000 for the charity Project 150) for winning the inaugural Jeopardy! Masters tournament in 2023; and $150,000 for his third-place finish in the second Masters tournament. Holzhauer had previously won $58,333.33 in 2014 on The Chase, one-third of a $175,000 jackpot split among his three-person team. He also appeared on 500 Questions, but did not win anything.
4	James Holzhauer	$3,772,549	Jeopardy! Masters, $750,000	
4	James Holzhauer	$3,772,549	Jeopardy! The Greatest of All Time, $250,000	
4	James Holzhauer	$3,772,549	The Chase, $58,333.33	
5	Andrew Kravis	$2,677,550	The Million Second Quiz, $2,600,000	In the 2013 The Million Second Quiz, Kravis won $326,346 in the main competition as one of the top four finalists, then won a $2,000,000 grand prize. The producers then deliberately rounded up Kravis's total to $2,600,000 as a contrivance to ensure that Kravis's total would break the record then held by Jennings. He previously took part in Jeopardy!'s Teen Tournament in 2002 and was eliminated in the tournament's semi-final round.
5	Andrew Kravis	$2,677,550	Wheel of Fortune, $50,550	In the 2013 The Million Second Quiz, Kravis won $326,346 in the main competition as one of the top four finalists, then won a $2,000,000 grand prize. The producers then deliberately rounded up Kravis's total to $2,600,000 as a contrivance to ensure that Kravis's total would break the record then held by Jennings. He previously took part in Jeopardy!'s Teen Tournament in 2002 and was eliminated in the tournament's semi-final round.
5	Andrew Kravis	$2,677,550	Trivial Pursuit, $21,000	In the 2013 The Million Second Quiz, Kravis won $326,346 in the main competition as one of the top four finalists, then won a $2,000,000 grand prize. The producers then deliberately rounded up Kravis's total to $2,600,000 as a contrivance to ensure that Kravis's total would break the record then held by Jennings. He previously took part in Jeopardy!'s Teen Tournament in 2002 and was eliminated in the tournament's semi-final round.
5	Andrew Kravis	$2,677,550	Jeopardy!, $5,000	In the 2013 The Million Second Quiz, Kravis won $326,346 in the main competition as one of the top four finalists, then won a $2,000,000 grand prize. The producers then deliberately rounded up Kravis's total to $2,600,000 as a contrivance to ensure that Kravis's total would break the record then held by Jennings. He previously took part in Jeopardy!'s Teen Tournament in 2002 and was eliminated in the tournament's semi-final round.
5	Andrew Kravis	$2,677,550	Who Wants to Be a Millionaire, $1,000	In the 2013 The Million Second Quiz, Kravis won $326,346 in the main competition as one of the top four finalists, then won a $2,000,000 grand prize. The producers then deliberately rounded up Kravis's total to $2,600,000 as a contrivance to ensure that Kravis's total would break the record then held by Jennings. He previously took part in Jeopardy!'s Teen Tournament in 2002 and was eliminated in the tournament's semi-final round.
6	Kevin Olmstead	$2,205,901	Who Wants to Be a Millionaire, $2,180,000	Olmstead's primary win occurred during the progressive jackpot shows on Who Wants to Be a Millionaire in 2001. Following this win, Olmstead held the record as the biggest winner in American television for over three years until it was broken by Jennings. He also held the record as the biggest winner on a primetime game show in U.S. television history for over twelve years before Kravis broke it on September 19, 2013.
6	Kevin Olmstead	$2,205,901	Jeopardy!, $25,901	Olmstead's primary win occurred during the progressive jackpot shows on Who Wants to Be a Millionaire in 2001. Following this win, Olmstead held the record as the biggest winner in American television for over three years until it was broken by Jennings. He also held the record as the biggest winner on a primetime game show in U.S. television history for over twelve years before Kravis broke it on September 19, 2013.
7	Vance Walker	$2,000,000	American Ninja Warrior, $2,000,000	After initially appearing on American Ninja Warrior Junior, Walker won the million-dollar prize on the fifteenth and sixteenth seasons of American Ninja Warrior. Walker was later Player 174 in Beast Games, where he was eliminated in the cubes. After his second win on American Ninja Warrior, Walker became the first contestant in game show history to win the top prize twice on the same show; Walker was also, at one point, the only contestant to accomplish this feat until Yogesh Raut became the second contestant to earn this title after winning Jeopardy! Masters for a second time on September 8, 2026.
8	Matt Amodio	$1,964,601	Jeopardy!, $1,679,601	In 2021, Amodio won 38 consecutive games of Jeopardy!, finishing third in his 39th. He also received $10,000 in the semi-finals of Jeopardy!'s 2022 Tournament of Champions an additional $150,000 for his third-place finish in the 2023 Jeopardy! Masters and an additional $50,000 for placing sixth in the 2024 Jeopardy! Masters. Amodio then added another $150,000 to his total for winning the Jeopardy! Invitational Tournament in 2025. Amodio's total number of regular-season wins is the third-most all-time behind Jennings and Schneider. He also won $10,000 by being in the Jeopardy Invitational Tournament 2026 semi-finals.
8	Matt Amodio	$1,964,601	Jeopardy! Masters, $200,000	
9	Ed Toutant	$1,871,401	Who Wants to Be a Millionaire, $1,860,000	Toutant (December 27, 1951 – November 6, 2018) was another contestant during the progressive jackpot shows on Who Wants to Be a Millionaire? in 2001. After missing a question, leaving him with $1,000, which was later revealed to be flawed, Toutant was invited back to continue playing for the jackpot at the same level he was playing for during his original appearance. Toutant was able to complete the remaining questions and win a jackpot of $1.86 million.
9	Ed Toutant	$1,871,401	Jeopardy!, $11,401	Toutant (December 27, 1951 – November 6, 2018) was another contestant during the progressive jackpot shows on Who Wants to Be a Millionaire? in 2001. After missing a question, leaving him with $1,000, which was later revealed to be flawed, Toutant was invited back to continue playing for the jackpot at the same level he was playing for during his original appearance. Toutant was able to complete the remaining questions and win a jackpot of $1.86 million.
10	Amy Schneider	$1,864,800	Jeopardy!, $1,689,800	From 2021 to 2022, Schneider won 40 consecutive games of Jeopardy!, the second-most behind Jennings. She finished second in her 41st game. She is the first woman in Jeopardy! history with over $1,000,000 in career winnings and the first openly transgender contestant to qualify for the show's Tournament of Champions, a tournament she would go on to win, adding $250,000 to her career total. She went on to win $75,000 in the Masters tournament. She came 2nd place in the Jeopardy! Invitational Tournament and won an extra $50,000. She came in 4th place on the 2nd season of the Masters tournament and won $100,000 In 2025, Schneider participated in the Jeopardy! Invitational Tournament and received another $5,000 after finishing third in the quarterfinals. To date, she is the most successful transgender game show contestant in American television history.
10	Amy Schneider	$1,864,800	Jeopardy! Masters, $175,000	
11	Ike Barinholtz	$1,835,000	Celebrity Jeopardy!, $1,200,000	Barinholtz's winnings include a $125,000 prize from Who Wants to Be a Millionaire's 2020 revival on April 22, 2020, as well as the top prize of $1,000,000 from the first season of Celebrity Jeopardy! on February 2, 2023. Barinholtz donated his Millionaire and Celebrity Jeopardy! winnings to the charities Uplift Family Services and Pacific Clinics, respectively. By virtue of winning Celebrity Jeopardy!, Barinholtz was invited to participate in the 2024 Jeopardy! Tournament of Champions, where he earned $10,000 for winning his quarterfinal match and losing to the tournament's eventual runner-up, Ben Chan, in the semi-finals. Barinholtz then returned to Millionaire on August 14, 2024, this time playing along with his father Alan Barinholtz. They would go on to win the top prize for a $1,000,000 donation to the ASL program at Los Encinos School. In May 2026, Barinholtz returned to Celebrity Jeopardy in the shows' All-Stars special, where he once again reached the finale, playing against former Celebrity Jeopardy! contestants Steven Weber and Mina Kimes, but would finish in second place, winning $200,000 for his charity.
11	Ike Barinholtz	$1,835,000	Who Wants to Be a Millionaire, $625,000 (Note: Barinholtz's total includes his $125,000 individual prize from his original appearance on the show and half of the $1,000,000 prize ($500,000) from his second appearance playing alongside his father Alan.)	
11	Ike Barinholtz	$1,835,000	Jeopardy!, $10,000	
12	Yogesh Raut	$1,798,403	Jeopardy!, $348,403	Raut won $96,403 over three regular games on Jeopardy!, and lost his fourth game for a consolation prize of $2,000. He won the 2024 Tournament of Champions for an additional $250,000, and advanced to Jeopardy! Masters. On Masters, he came second in 2024 for $250,000. Raut won the 2025 tournament for $500,000 for himself and extra $100,000 for the charity of his choice; Raut also won the 2026 tournament, once again earning him $500,000 for himself and $100,000 for the charity of his choice. Raut became the second contestant in game show history to win the top prize twice on the same show, after Vance Walker who won $1,000,000 on American Ninja Warrior in 2023 and 2024.
12	Yogesh Raut	$1,798,403	Jeopardy! Masters, $1,450,000	
13	Ashlee Register	$1,795,000	Duel, $1,795,000	Register's Duel winnings include $75,000 plus an accumulating $1,720,000 jackpot. She is the highest-earning game show contestant to appear on only one game show. (Note: David Genat, who is the biggest game show winner in the history of American television, has only appeared on one American game show; however, Genat has also appeared on the Australian edition of Survivor. In Australia, Survivor is classified as a game show, meaning that Genat has made more than one game show appearance; however, Register has only appeared on one game show worldwide, therefore, she holds the title of highest-earning game show contestant who has only appeared on one game show.) She is also the first woman to win more than one million dollars on a game show.
14	David Legler	$1,765,000	Twenty-One, $1,765,000	Legler earned $1,765,000 over six wins on the 2000 revival of Twenty-One, making him the show's biggest winner.
15	Curtis Warren	$1,546,988	Greed, $1,410,000	After Warren won $410,000 in late 1999 on Greed, he was one of four big winners invited back in early 2000 for the Million Dollar Moment, where he added a then-record-setting $1,000,000 prize to his total winnings on the show. Warren was also a winning contestant on Sale of the Century in 1986 and Win Ben Stein's Money in 1998, and failed to win any money on Jeopardy! in a 1986 appearance.
15	Curtis Warren	$1,546,988	Sale of the Century, $136,288	After Warren won $410,000 in late 1999 on Greed, he was one of four big winners invited back in early 2000 for the Million Dollar Moment, where he added a then-record-setting $1,000,000 prize to his total winnings on the show. Warren was also a winning contestant on Sale of the Century in 1986 and Win Ben Stein's Money in 1998, and failed to win any money on Jeopardy! in a 1986 appearance.
15	Curtis Warren	$1,546,988	Win Ben Stein's Money, $700	After Warren won $410,000 in late 1999 on Greed, he was one of four big winners invited back in early 2000 for the Million Dollar Moment, where he added a then-record-setting $1,000,000 prize to his total winnings on the show. Warren was also a winning contestant on Sale of the Century in 1986 and Win Ben Stein's Money in 1998, and failed to win any money on Jeopardy! in a 1986 appearance.
16	Jamie Ding	$1,385,605	Jeopardy!, $885,605	In 2026, Jamie won 31 consecutive games of Jeopardy!. He finished second in his 32nd game. He also won $1,000,000 for the Eastern Congo Initiative on Who Wants to Be a Millionaire on July 29, 2026, alongside Ben Affleck.
16	Jamie Ding	$1,385,605	Who Wants to Be a Millionaire, $500,000	In 2026, Jamie won 31 consecutive games of Jeopardy!. He finished second in his 32nd game. He also won $1,000,000 for the Eastern Congo Initiative on Who Wants to Be a Millionaire on July 29, 2026, alongside Ben Affleck.
17	John Carpenter	$1,250,000	Who Wants to Be a Millionaire, $1,250,000	Carpenter's winnings include $1,000,000 as first ever top prize winner on the show, as well as the entire franchise itself, and $250,000 ($125,000 of which was donated to charity) in the champions edition of the show.
18	Lisa Ann Walter	$1,242,500	Celebrity Jeopardy!, $1,050,000	Walter's winnings for charity include $1,000,000 from the second season of Celebrity Jeopardy! in primetime, half of a $250,000 prize from a 2024 episode of Who Wants to Be a Millionaire shared with Rosie O'Donnell's charity, and $62,500 from a 2001 episode of Weakest Link. She also won $5,000 in the 2026 Jeopardy! Tournament of Champions despite being eliminated in the first round. In May 2026, she returned to Celebrity Jeopardy only to come up short in the semi-finals, winning $50,000 for her charity.
18	Lisa Ann Walter	$1,242,500	Who Wants to Be a Millionaire, $125,000	
18	Lisa Ann Walter	$1,242,500	Weakest Link, $62,500	
18	Lisa Ann Walter	$1,242,500	Jeopardy!, $5,000	
19	Jordan Fowler	$1,230,000	Deal or No Deal Island, $1,230,000	Fowler won $1,230,000 on the first-season finale of Deal or No Deal Island on May 13, 2024. She is the first contestant to win more than $1,000,000 in Deal or No Deal history.
20	Adam Rose	$1,153,908	The Price Is Right, $1,153,908	Rose's total was achieved on a $1,000,000 Spectacular special episode, winning $153,908 in cash and prizes including both of that evening's Showcases, which earned him a $1,000,000 cash bonus. Rose holds the record for the most money a contestant has ever won in the show's history.
21	Michael Haynes	$1,137,697	The Price Is Right, $1,127,062	Haynes's winnings came on a $1,000,000 Spectacular special episode, winning $127,062 in cash and prizes including both of that evening's Showcases, which earned him a $1,000,000 cash bonus. Haynes also won $10,635 on Press Your Luck in December 1983.
21	Michael Haynes	$1,137,697	Press Your Luck, $10,635	Haynes's winnings came on a $1,000,000 Spectacular special episode, winning $127,062 in cash and prizes including both of that evening's Showcases, which earned him a $1,000,000 cash bonus. Haynes also won $10,635 on Press Your Luck in December 1983.
22	Rahim Oberholtzer	$1,120,000	Twenty-One, $1,120,000	Oberholtzer's earnings came across four wins on the 2000 revival of Twenty-One, making him the show's second-biggest winner behind Legler.
23	Michael McKean	$1,115,400	Jeopardy!, $1,115,400	McKean's Jeopardy! winnings include $15,400 from his first Celebrity Jeopardy! appearance in 1999, $50,000 from his second appearance in 2006, and a total of $1,050,000 from the show's Million Dollar Celebrity Invitational in 2009–10. McKean's winnings resulted in the single-largest donation ever to the International Myeloma Foundation.
24	Tim Hsieh	$1,106,309	It's Your Chance of a Lifetime, $1,042,309	Hsieh was the highest-earning contestant of the short-lived 2000 game show It's Your Chance of a Lifetime. He also won $64,000 on Who Wants to Be a Millionaire in 2003, and finished third in an appearance on Jeopardy! in 1997.
24	Tim Hsieh	$1,106,309	Who Wants to Be a Millionaire, $64,000	Hsieh was the highest-earning contestant of the short-lived 2000 game show It's Your Chance of a Lifetime. He also won $64,000 on Who Wants to Be a Millionaire in 2003, and finished third in an appearance on Jeopardy! in 1997.
25	Cynthia Azevedo	$1,089,017	The Price Is Right, $1,089,017	Azevedo's total was achieved on a $1,000,000 Spectacular special episode, winning the "Clock Game" pricing game within ten seconds, earning her a $1,000,000 bonus. She also won her episode's Showcase, bringing her total value in cash and prizes to $1,089,017.
