= Tic-Tac-Dough =

American television game show

- Genre: Game show
- Created by: Jack Barry; Dan Enright
- Directed by: Edward King; Hudson Fausett; Garry Simpson; Richard Auerback; Richard S. Kline; Dan Diana; Michael Dimich; Stacie Saugen
- Presented by: Jack Barry; Gene Rayburn; Jay Jackson; Win Elliot; Bill Wendell; Wink Martindale; Jim Caldwell; Patrick Wayne; Brooke Burns
- Announcer: Bill Wendell; Bill McCord; Jay Stewart; Charlie O'Donnell; Larry Van Nuys
- Theme music composer: Paul Taubman; Hal Hidey; Henry Mancini
- Country of origin: United States
- Original language: English
- No. of seasons: 8 (syndication; 1978–86); 1 (syndication; 1990); 1 (GSN)
- No. of episodes: 45 (CBS); 1,520 (syndication; 1978–86); 65 (syndication; 1990); 40 (GSN)

Production
- Executive producers: Jack Barry; Dan Enright (1978–90); Louis M. Heyward (1990); Rane Laymance (2025); Harry Friedman (2025); Brenda Milinkovic (2025); Shannon Perry (2025)
- Producer: Howard Felsher; Ron Greenberg; Allen Koss; Chris Sohl
- Production locations: NBC Studios; New York, New York (1956–59); CBS Television City; Hollywood, California (1978–80); KCOP/Chris Craft Studios; Hollywood, California (1981–84; 1985–86); The Production Group Studios; Hollywood, California (1984–85); Hollywood Center Studios; Hollywood, California (1990); Radford Studio Center (2025)
- Running time: approx. 22–26 minutes
- Production companies: Barry & Enright Productions (1956–90); NBCUniversal Syndication Studios (2025–present); Village Roadshow Television (2025); Game Show Enterprises (2025)

Original release
- Network: NBC
- Release: July 30, 1956 – October 23, 1959
- Network: CBS
- Release: July 3 – September 1, 1978
- Network: Syndication
- Release: September 18, 1978 – May 23, 1986
- Release: September 10 – December 7, 1990
- Network: Game Show Network
- Release: April 14 – June 16, 2025

Tic-Tac-Dough is an American television game show based on the paper-and-pencil game of tic-tac-toe. Contestants answer trivia questions to put up their respective symbol, X or O, on a tic-tac-toe board. Four versions were produced: the initial 1956–1959 run on NBC, a 1978–1986 run initially on CBS and then in first-run syndication, a syndicated run in 1990, and a 2025 revival on Game Show Network. The show was produced by Barry & Enright Productions. However, the rights to the format are controlled by NBCUniversal.

Jack Barry, the co-producer, was the original host of the 1950s version, followed by Gene Rayburn and then Bill Wendell, with Jay Jackson and Win Elliot hosting prime time adaptations as well. Wink Martindale hosted the network and syndicated version beginning in 1978, but left the program to host and co-produce Headline Chasers and was replaced by Jim Caldwell for the 1985–86 season. Patrick Wayne hosted the 1990 version. In April 2024, GSN announced another revival, to be hosted by Brooke Burns, which premiered on April 14, 2025.

== Gameplay ==
Two contestants attempt to complete a line of three X or O markers on a standard tic-tac-toe board, with nine spaces on it. The returning champion represents X, and the challenger represents O; the game always starts with the player using the X's. Each of the nine spaces on the gameboard features a category. Contestants alternate choosing a category and answering a general interest or trivia question in that category. Getting the question correct puts the contestant's respective letter on the board, while getting it incorrect leaves it unclaimed. The center square, being of the most strategic importance, involves a two-part question, with the contestant given 10 seconds to think of the two answers needed to win the square. After each question, the categories shuffle into different positions; originally, the categories shuffled after each round. A contestant wins the game achieving three X's or three O's in a row, either horizontally (across), vertically (up and down), or diagonally. If it becomes impossible for either contestant to form a winning line, whether or not all nine spaces had been claimed, the game is declared a draw, and a new one began with the pot rolling over.

The gameboard on the original 1950s series used rolling drums (each containing the same nine categories) to display subject categories, with light displays beneath them to indicate X's and O's. When Tic-Tac-Dough was revived in 1978, the gameboard was made up of nine Apple II systems connected to individual computer monitors to represent each game screen, all linked to a central Altair 8800 computer, which displayed the categories, X's and O's, bonus game numbers and amounts, and a dragon, in addition to a moving screensaver and custom messages; it was the first game show to use computerized graphics.

On the original 1950s Tic-Tac-Dough, a winning contestant played until either he/she was defeated or elected to stop; the new champion's initial winnings would be deducted from the outgoing champion's final total. On the 1978 CBS series, contestants played until either being defeated or reaching the network's $25,000 total winnings limit. The syndicated series allowed contestants to play until defeated, and for every five matches that they won, champions were rewarded with a new automobile.

As questions are answered correctly, a money amount is added to a "pot", or amount of money awarded to the winner.

Version	Center Box	Outer Box
1956–59, NBC Daytime, 1978, CBS	$200	$100
1957–58, NBC Nighttime	$500	$300
1978–86, Syndicated	$300	$200
1990, Syndicated	$1,000	$500

On the original series, the same nine categories were used for an entire match regardless of the number of games played and/or episodes it took. On all subsequent series, each new game featured a different set of nine categories. If there were ties on the original series, the CBS series or the first syndicated series, the pot was carried over to each subsequent game until someone won. In the 1990 series, there was no carryover of the pot from a tied game. Instead, the values of the outer boxes increased by $500 and the center box by $1,000 until the tie was broken.

For each tie game before being defeated, losing challengers received $100 on the 1950s version and $250 from 1979 to 1986; champions who eventually lost the match after a tie game did not receive any additional money.

On the GSN version, there are three rounds of play. For the first two rounds, each category is a multiple-choice question with three answers. In round one, each correct answer is worth 100 points, and a Tic-Tac-Dough is worth 500 points. In round two, the points are doubled, and one category is worth double points. An incorrect answer changes the box chosen into a new category and finding the dragon hidden on the board forfeits the contestant's turn. In round three, each contestant has their own board of nine categories and 60 seconds to get as many Tic-Tac-Doughs as possible. Each correct answer is worth 300 points, and a Tic-Tac-Dough is worth 1,000 points. An incorrect answer blocks that box and finding the dragon costs the contestant 5 seconds. The contestant with the most points at the end of the game wins $1,000 and plays the bonus round; otherwise, in case of a tie, a sudden-death question in a pre-determined category will be read to the players, and whoever buzzes in with the correct answer takes the $1,000 and advances; an incorrect response gives the opponent the opportunity to win it; however, should the other player miss, the procedure is repeated until someone wins it.

=== Special categories ===
Special categories were introduced in 1980 and used throughout the rest of the syndicated run and the 1990 version, marked by red backgrounds in the former and red lettering in the latter. Only one such category was used per game at first; later, the board would display two and then three. These categories never appeared in the center box, either at the start of the game or after a shuffle and many of the special categories involved both contestants to play and were used for either a win or a block.

- Auction – Contestants were read a question with multiple answers, and bid back and forth as to how many they could give. The bidding continued until one contestant either challenged the other or reached the maximum number of answers. The winning bidder claimed the box by fulfilling their bid, but a miss (giving an answer that was not on the list, repeating an answer already said or taking too much time) allowed the opponent a chance to steal it by giving one more correct answer.
- Bonus Category – A three-part question was asked, awarding an extra turn if the contestant answered correctly. The categories were shuffled before the extra turn; as a result, it was possible for the champion to win the game on his/her first turn by repeatedly selecting this category. If this happened, the challenger was invited back to compete in the next game.
- Challenge Category – The contestant who selected this category could answer the question or challenge their opponent to answer. Either contestant could win the box with a correct answer, and the one in control could also win it on a miss by the opponent. Renamed Trivia or Dare on the current GSN version.
- Double or Nothing – If the contestant answered the question correctly, they could either keep the box or try to earn a second one. If unsuccessful, both boxes went unclaimed. The rule was later changed to force the contestant to play for the second box. When this category was selected, the board did not shuffle after the first question was answered correctly.
- Grand Question – This category replaced Secret Category (see below). A correct answer added $1,000 to the pot.
- Hand-Off Category – For the first occasions, it was called Hand-Off (Category Unknown). In this category, it has a multiple choice of three answers. If a player missed a question, his or her opponent could get the opportunity to answer the same question without affecting his or her next turn.
- It's a Dilemma – The contestant heard one clue to a subject and could request up to five more; however, before the extra clues were read, the opponent decided who would answer. A miss awarded the box to the contestant who had not answered.
- Jump-In Category – This was the show's first red category where contestants used buzzers (the red button in front of them) to ring-in and answer a question. A correct answer won the box, but if the contestant buzzed-in with an incorrect answer or took too long to respond, then the other contestant got to hear the entire question for a chance to win the box. In the 1990 version, the category name was accompanied by a general subject or "Who?", "What?", "Where?", etc.
  - The 1978 CBS daytime series employed jump-in questions during gameplay but there was no specific category for them. Instead, if a box had its background change color from blue to black in a shuffle, the question from the category in the box was played as a jump-in.
- Number Please – The contestants were asked a question with a numerical answer. The one in control offered a guess, and the opponent tried to predict whether the correct answer was higher or lower. A correct prediction won the box for the opponent, while a miss or an exact answer awarded it to the contestant in control.
- Opponent's Choice – The contestant answered a question from one of two categories which were selected for them by the opponent. During the 1985–86 season, one category contained one question while the other category contained two.
- Play or Pass – The contestant had the option to skip the first question and answer a second.
- Secret Category – This was the show's first red category, which first appeared in the lower right hand corner at the start, then later appeared in the bottom center at the start. The topic of the Secret Category was only announced by the host after it was selected, and a correct answer doubled the entire pot. Replaced by Grand Question (see above) in fall 1983.
- Seesaw – A question with multiple answers was asked, and the contestants alternated giving one answer at a time. As soon as either contestant gave an answer that was not on the list, repeated any previous answer or took too much time the opponent could win the box by giving one more correct answer. If the opponent also missed, the box remained unclaimed. Either contestant could also win the box by giving the last correct answer.
- Showdown – Contestants were asked a two-part question, using the buzzers to ring-in. The first one to ring-in could answer whichever part they chose, leaving the opponent to take the other. If only one of the two answered correctly, that contestant won the box; otherwise, additional questions were asked until the box was claimed. In the 1990 version, the contestant who chose the category answered the first part they chose and the opponent answered the second part.
- Take Two – The question had two clues. The contestant could answer after the first clue, but to receive the second clue he or she had to first give the opponent a chance to answer.
- Three to Win – A series of buzz-in questions was asked to both contestants, with the first to answer three correctly winning the box.
- Top Ten – A question with ranked answers was asked. The contestant who chose the higher-ranked answer won the box; however, if the first contestant gave the top-ranked answer, he/she automatically won the box. Renamed Top This during the 1985–86 season and Top 5 on the current GSN version.
- Trivia Challenge – A question with three multiple-choice answers was asked. The contestant chose to answer first or defer to their opponent. Regardless of who started, if a contestant was incorrect, his/her opponent could choose from the remaining answers. If the opponent also guessed wrong, the box remained unclaimed. Renamed Trivia Dare during the 1984–85 season.

=== Bonus round ===
The bonus round was introduced in the 1978 version, giving the winner of a match a chance to "Beat the Dragon".

==== CBS (Summer 1978) ====
On the CBS summer run, the bonus round had four X's, four O's, and one dragon hidden inside the nine monitors. The X's and O's were shuffled around so that one of the symbols formed a three-in-a-row. For each X and O a contestant revealed, $150 was added to the pot. The contestant won the money and a prize package for finding the "Tic-Tac-Dough" line but could quit and take the cash at any time. Later in the run, the champion automatically wins if the pot goes over $1,000. Finding the dragon ended the round and lost all the money in the pot; if the dragon was found, the same prize package was at stake for the entire episode until won.

==== Syndication (1978–1986) ====
On the syndicated run, the squares contained the words TIC and TAC, six dollar amounts: $100, $150, $250, $300, $400, $500 (originally $50, $150, $250, $350, $400, and $500), and a dragon. These items were shuffled and hidden behind the numbers 1 through 9, and the contestant chose one number at a time. If a dollar amount was revealed, it was added to the pot. The goal was to accumulate $1,000 or more without finding the dragon; if successful, the contestant won the money and a prize package usually worth between $2,000 and $5,000. For the first five seasons, the same prize package was at stake for the entire show until won, but the final three seasons offered a different package in each new bonus round.

Finding both TIC and TAC constituted an automatic victory, awarding the prize package and increasing the pot to $1,000. If the dragon was found, the game ended immediately and the contestant forfeited the money. After any safe choice, the contestant had the option to stop the game and keep the money. For a brief period in 1983, a contestant had to accumulate exactly $1,000 or find TIC and TAC, but this requirement was quickly eliminated.

===== Dragon Finder =====
For a time in 1983, members of the studio audience were invited to play a special "Dragon Finder" game whenever the bonus round was won or a contestant stopped early. The remaining numbers on the board were not immediately uncovered; instead, an audience member would be selected to choose which number hid the dragon. If that person did not find the dragon, another audience member would be asked to choose one of the remaining numbers. The prize for finding it was originally a flat $250, but was later increased by $50 for each incorrect guess. When the change was made to invite two audience members to take turns choosing numbers, the losing member received $50.

==== Syndication (1990) ====
The short-lived 1990 syndicated series used a bonus round that was similar to the 1978 CBS bonus round, with the champion playing for cash and a merchandise prize. Instead of trying to reach a winning score, though, the champion chose either X or O and tried to complete a Tic-Tac-Dough line with that symbol. X's and O's were shuffled around the board, along with the dragon and a "Dragon Slayer" knight, and the champion pressed a button to stop the shuffle and then chose one box at a time. The pot began at $500 when the champion first uncovered their chosen symbol in a box, and doubled for each additional one found. The champion had the option to stop after any turn and keep the money in the pot. The champion could win the prize either by completing a Tic-Tac-Dough, which awarded all the money in the pot; or by finding the Dragon Slayer, which awarded double the pot, or $1,000 if it was empty. Finding the dragon ended the round and forfeited the pot.

Three of one symbol and four of the other were hidden on the board, arranged so that a Tic-Tac-Dough could be achieved with only one of them. If the champion chose the other symbol, they could only win the prize by finding the Dragon Slayer. Regardless of the outcome, the entire board was revealed at the end of the round.

==== GSN (2025–present) ====
On the GSN version, the bonus round is a variation of round three. The contestant will have 60 seconds to make one Tic-Tac-Dough. For each correct or incorrect answer, the dragon will move around the board, trying to block the contestant's path, starting in the center box. If the contestant gets 1 Tic-Tac-Dough before time runs out, their winnings are increased to $10,000. If they fail to make a Tic-Tac-Dough even if they reach the point where it's not possible to make a Tic-Tac-Dough –which stops the clock and ends the bonus round immediately afterwards– they leave with just the $1,000 that they won.

== Record winnings ==
With contestants being able to play until defeated, several Tic-Tac-Dough contestants were able to win over $100,000 on the show. Over the course of nine weeks in 1980, Thom McKee defeated 43 opponents and amassed a winnings total of $312,700, including eight cars and over $200,000 in cash – a record at the time. One match ended with McKee winning the single biggest pot in the show's history, which reached $36,800 after four tie games against challenger Pete Cooper.

As a contestant on Tic Tac Dough, McKee won $312,700 in cash and prizes over 46 days on the show. He played a total of 89 games, defeating 43 opponents (the remaining games other than his last being drawn), and answered 353 questions correctly. His total prizes included eight cars (as winners on Tic Tac Dough were awarded a new car every fifth win), three sailboats, 16 vacations (which he was unable to take), several other smaller prizes, and $200,000 in cash. Prior to McKee's record, the most ever won on a television game show was The Joker's Wild contestant Eileen Jason, who won $305,280 ($250,000 of which was won during the 1979 Tournament of Champions). McKee was the biggest game show winner in television history for nearly twenty years, until Michael Shutterly won $500,000 on Who Wants to Be a Millionaire on August 25, 1999.

The wins and consecutive days records were broken by 100% contestant Ian Lygo in 1998, while the winnings record was broken by Michael Shutterly during the original 15-night run of Who Wants to Be a Millionaire in 1999, where he won $500,000. McKee still holds the American record for most consecutive games played (100 games, 56 wins), due to the nature of Tic Tac Dough making ties possible (and frequent). However, Jeopardy! contestant Ken Jennings (who himself set a new cash winnings record, and later became host of the show), beat the wins record with 74, and most consecutive days with 75 in 2004–05.

== Broadcast history ==
=== NBC: 1956–1959 ===
Tic-Tac-Dough premiered on NBC daytime television on July 30, 1956, hosted by co-creator and co-executive producer Jack Barry.

Beginning on September 12, 1956, Barry began hosting Twenty-One in Primetime. The show was initially on Wednesday nights but quickly moved to Thursday nights. At this point, Gene Rayburn began hosting Tic-Tac-Dough on Fridays. Twenty-One later moved to Monday nights in February, 1957, and Barry once again hosted the show all five days of the week. Barry left the show and was replaced by announcer Bill Wendell on October 6, 1958. Wendell hosted the show, with the announcing taken over by Bill McCord, until its demise on October 23, 1959.

A nighttime version, produced in color, played for bigger stakes aired from September 12, 1957, to December 29, 1958. Jay Jackson was the original host, and was replaced by Win Elliot on October 2, 1958, for the duration of the show's nighttime run. Johnny Olson filled in as both host and announcer at varying points on this version.

==== Quiz show scandal ====
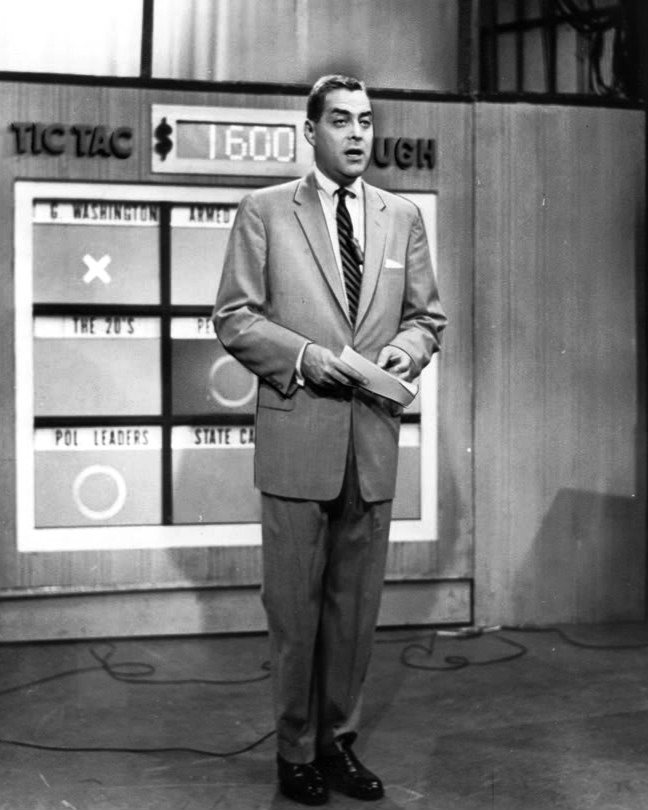
The daytime show with host Jack Barry, 1957

In August 1958, the cross-network hit game show Dotto was canceled after network and sponsor executives discovered that it had been rigged. Deposed Twenty-One champion Herb Stempel made allegations of rigging on that show as well; once his claims were confirmed, the big-money quiz shows began to sink in the ratings and disappear from the air as the scandal widened.

Tic-Tac-Dough did not go unscathed before its cancellation. The April 3, 1958 episode featuring U.S. military serviceman Michael O'Rourke winning over $140,000 became one key subject of the federal grand jury investigating the quiz fixing. That run occurred during Jay Jackson's tenure as host. Jackson was never implicated in any wrongdoing himself, and he had left the show well before the quiz investigations began, but he never again hosted a television game show. The same could not be said for Tic-Tac-Dough producer Howard Felsher. Felsher was in charge of all facets of the show's production, including selecting contestants. One of them, sixteen-year-old Kirsten Falke, auditioned as a folk singer. This led her to the offices of Tic-Tac-Dough producer Felsher, who provided Kirsten with the answers and hints to win on the show and a promise to showcase her talent and sing. "I botched it up", said Kirsten. She requested her categories in the wrong order and, as a result, walked away with a paltry $800. A grand jury subpoenaed Kirsten to testify, and Felsher implored her to lie. Felsher admitted to Congress that he urged roughly 30 former show contestants and all of his production staff to lie to the grand jury, and that he had himself lied under oath. Felsher also estimated that about 75% of the nighttime Tic-Tac-Dough run had been rigged. Felsher was fired in the fallout of the quiz show scandals by NBC, but later resurfaced as a producer for Goodson-Todman Productions in the 1970s and 1980s.

The daytime show was unaffected, and host Gene Rayburn suffered no damage to his career. After Tic-Tac-Dough, he went to Goodson-Todman, where on December 31, 1962, he began the first of his hosting assignments of The Match Game.

=== CBS/Syndication: 1978–1986 ===
Almost two decades after its original cancellation, the game was reborn as The New Tic-Tac-Dough on CBS, which gave it a place on its daytime schedule. The series ran from July 3 to September 1, 1978, at 10:00 a.m. Eastern/9:00 a.m. Central, replacing the Bill Cullen-hosted Pass the Buck. Coincidentally, that timeslot had been occupied from September 1972 to June 1975 by the original version of Barry's The Joker's Wild.

However, the CBS TTD ran only nine weeks because of the high popularity of its competition on NBC, Card Sharks. It was replaced by daytime repeats of All in the Family, which had already been running on CBS for about two and a half years. When it was cancelled by CBS, TTD had averaged a 3.9 rating/21 share through July 28, and had a clearance rate of 84%. TTD was one of numerous failed attempts by CBS to find a suitable lead-in to The Price Is Right, by then a daytime institution; it was not until The New $25,000 Pyramid and Press Your Luck arrived in 1982 and 1983, respectively, that the network finally succeeded in that effort.

On September 18, a nighttime version premiered in first-run syndication, where it aired in some markets as a companion series to Joker, which went into an off-network version the previous season. This was a nearly identical situation to a 1976 game packaged by Barry and Enright, Break the Bank, which was hurriedly put into syndication after ABC cancelled it just three months into a daytime run in order to expand two of the network's daytime serials; the syndicated version ran during the 1976–77 season.

Wink Martindale hosted Tic-Tac-Dough for its first seven seasons, then left on May 24, 1985, to host his new creation, Headline Chasers. Jim Caldwell took over as host on September 23, 1985, and hosted until the series finale on May 23, 1986. Jay Stewart served as announcer for the first three years. Charlie O'Donnell replaced Stewart in 1981 (O'Donnell had taken over the same position from Stewart on the other two Barry & Enright produced game shows The Joker's Wild and Bullseye) and would continue the role until the series ended in 1986. Occasional substitutes for those announcers included Johnny Gilbert (including the syndicated premiere), Bob Hilton, Mike Darow, John Harlan, and Art James.

In an interview, Martindale stated that while the CBS version began airing Barry & Enright Productions secured a spot to air a syndicated version that began in the fall. The CBS version ended due to poor ratings, but the syndicated version drew high numbers and as a result had an eight-year run.

Throughout its eight-year run, the show used its theme song entitled "Crazy Fun", which was composed by Hal Hidey. From 1978 to the end of 1980, the show was recorded at CBS Television City in Hollywood in studio 31 and studio 43 at different times. From 1981 to 1984 and again for the final season from 1985 to 1986, the show was taped at the studios of KCOP (also known as Chris Craft Studios). The 1984–85 season was taped at The Production Group Studios, while Chris Craft Studios was getting an overhaul.

Beginning around early 1979, every Friday was "Hat Day", where Martindale received hats from viewers to show off at the end of the show. Some were winter hats, and some even dealt with the show (such as having a picture of a dragon on them). He also wore hats on the Friday shows of Las Vegas Gambit, which he was also hosting on NBC at the time, requiring Martindale to commute between Los Angeles and Las Vegas for over a year.

The gameboard, designed by Bob Bishop of Apple Computer, Inc., was driven by nine Apple II computers, each one responsible for displaying a single box of the gameboard, and in turn controlled by an Altair 8800 system. It was one of the first uses of computer graphics on a television game show.

=== Syndication: 1990 ===
The logo from the 1990 syndicated version, as seen when the show was rerun on USA

The second syndicated revival of the series premiered on September 10, 1990. Its theme music was composed by Henry Mancini, his final television theme song. The series was a Barry & Enright Production (the company's last) and distributed by ITC Entertainment and the game board was now computer-generated and displayed on one big TV screen.

As noted above, Patrick Wayne hosted, while Larry Van Nuys announced with Art James substituting for two weeks. The 1990 revival was one of four game shows to premiere on September 10, 1990, with five premiering altogether for the season. Like the other four series, however, Tic-Tac-Dough did not find an audience due to various factors such as poor clearances and competition from stronger programming. The series was the first of the five to be cancelled, airing its final new episode on December 7, 1990, after thirteen weeks. Three months of reruns followed and the show aired for the last time on March 8, 1991.

=== Game Show Network: 2025 ===
On January 30, 2024, it was reported that Game Show Network green lit a revival of the series. Production on the revival began in April 2024. A pilot was recorded in 2021 for NBCUniversal with Tom Bergeron as host, but the series was not picked up. On April 2, 2024, the show was officially announced, with Brooke Burns as host and Harry Friedman serving as one of the executive producers. The show premiered on April 14, 2025, at 7:00 p.m. ET, alongside the premiere of Bingo Blitz with Valerie Bertinelli. Coincidentally, Wink Martindale, the former host of Tic-Tac-Dough from 1978 to 1985, died the following day from complications of lymphoma at the age of 91.

== International versions ==
Tic-Tac-Dough is one of only three Barry & Enright game shows known to have foreign adaptations, the others being Twenty-One and Concentration.

Country	Name	Host	Channel	Year aired
Australia	Tic-Tac-Dough	Chuck Faulkner	Nine Network	1960–1964
Germany	Tick-Tack-Quiz	Fritz Benscher	ARD	1958–1967
Germany	Tic-Tac-Toe	Michael "Goofy" Förster	RTLplus	1992
Honduras	X-0 da Dinero	Salvador Nasralla	Televicentro	1990–present
Indonesia	Tak-Tik-BOOM	Dede Yusuf	RCTI	1992–1998
Indonesia	Tak-Tik-BOOM	Charles Bonar Sirait (Season 2)	RCTI	2010
Indonesia	Tak-Tik-BOOM	Arie Untung (Season 3)	RCTI	2010
Italy	Teletris	Roberto Stampa; Silvio Noto	Programma Nazionale	1962–1964
Italy	Telebum	Silvio Noto	Programma Nazionale	1965
Poland	Kółko i krzyżyk	Bolesław Kielski	TVP	1961–1975
Spain	X-O da dinero	Juan Viñas	TVE	1959–1960
United Kingdom	Criss Cross Quiz	Jeremy Hawk; Barbara Kelly	ITV	June 17, 1957 – November 8, 1961; July 8, 1964 – September 22, 1967
United Kingdom	Junior Criss Cross Quiz	Jeremy Hawk; Chris Kelly; Bob Holness; Mike Sarne; Chris Howland; Gordon Luck; Peter Wheeler; Bill Grundy; Danny Blanchflower; Barbara Kelly	ITV	November 13, 1957 – June 29, 1967
United States	Tic-Tac-Dough	Jack Barry (1956–1958); Gene Rayburn (1956–1957, Fridays only); Jay Jackson (1957–1958, primetime); Win Elliott (1958, primetime); Bill Wendell (1958–1959)	NBC	1956–1959
United States	(The New) Tic-Tac-Dough	Wink Martindale	CBS	Summer 1978
United States	Tic-Tac-Dough	Wink Martindale; Jim Caldwell	Syndication	1978–1985; 1985–1986
United States	Tic-Tac-Dough	Patrick Wayne	Syndication	1990
United States	Tic-Tac-Dough	Brooke Burns	Game Show Network	April 14 – June 16, 2025
