= Michael T. Shutterly =

- Born: November 23, 1952 (age 73)
- Education: University of Pennsylvania (BA); Boston University School of Law (JD)
- Occupations: Attorney, numismatist
- Known for: Game show winnings and competitive numismatic exhibiting

Michael Tom Shutterly (born November 23, 1952) is an American attorney, game-show contestant, and numismatist. He was a four-time champion on Jeopardy! in 1988 and won $49,200. In 1999, he became the first contestant to win $500,000 on the U.S. version of Who Wants to Be a Millionaire?.

== Early life and education ==
Shutterly was born in Florida and raised in Maryland. He received a Bachelor of Arts degree in physiological psychology from the University of Pennsylvania in 1974 and a Juris Doctor degree from Boston University School of Law in 1977.

== Legal career ==
After earning his Juris Doctor, Shutterly pursued a legal career, first as a trial lawyer and later as a staff lawyer for a financial institution. He subsequently retired from the legal profession.

== Game-show career ==
=== Jeopardy! ===
Shutterly appeared on Jeopardy! in 1988. He won four consecutive games before finishing second in his fifth appearance, earning $49,200 in total.

=== Trump Card ===
In 1990, Shutterly appeared on the short-lived game show Trump Card, winning $14,500 in a single day.

=== Who Wants to Be a Millionaire? ===
Shutterly's $500,000 question and correct answer; "Giuseppe" was misspelled as "Guiseppe" in the show's original answer choices

$500,000 (14 of 15) – no time limit

What was the real name of Pope John Paul I, who served as Pope for about a month in 1978?

1. Albino Luciani(correct answer)
2. Eugenio Pacelli
3. Guiseppe Sarto
4. Giovanni Braschi

In August 1999, Shutterly appeared on the first season of the U.S. version of Who Wants to Be a Millionaire?. He correctly answered the question that earned him $500,000 and then reached the $1 million question. He chose not to answer the final question and left the program with $500,000. Shutterly became the first contestant in the history of the U.S. version of Millionaire to win $500,000.

At the time, Shutterly's $500,000 prize was the largest prize awarded on the U.S. version. Shutterly's record was subsequently surpassed by John Carpenter, who became the first contestant to win the program's $1 million top prize in November 1999.

A November 2000 article in The New York Times Magazine about prominent game-show contestants described a gathering at a bar where a handful of the contestants were socializing. A man named Mike pointed them out to a couple of newcomers, identifying Shutterly as “the Michael Shutterly,” the man who had won $500,000 on Millionaire.

== Numismatics ==
Shutterly is a numismatist and competitive exhibitor. He is a four-time recipient of the Howland Wood Memorial Award for Best-of-Show Exhibit from the American Numismatic Association (ANA), winning in 2016, 2018, 2022, and 2025. The ANA describes the Howland Wood Memorial Award as the most prestigious award it gives to exhibitors. In 2018, he also received the ANA's Women in Numismatics Award and the Ira & Larry Goldberg Award for Best Exhibit of Coins that Made History.

His interest in numismatics began in childhood, but he stopped collecting in 1977 after his collection was stolen. Shutterly resumed collecting in 1982. His collecting interests include Byzantine coinage, Roman Republican denarii, and early medieval coins of western Europe, as well as United States cents, Roosevelt dimes, and denarii of the Severan dynasty. His focus has subsequently shifted toward numismatic research and writing.

Honorary titles
Preceded by Doug Van Gundy	Top prize winner on Who Wants to Be a Millionaire (U.S.); August 25, 1999	Succeeded by John Carpenter
Preceded by Thom McKee	All-time American game show winnings leader August–November 1999	Succeeded by John Carpenter
