= Wheel of Fortune =

Wheel of Fortune commonly refers to:

- Wheel of Fortune (medieval), the original symbol in ancient and medieval philosophy
- Wheel of Fortune (American game show) (1975–present), created by Merv Griffin

Wheel of Fortune, Wheels of Fortune, or The Wheel of Fortune may also refer to:

== Arts, entertainment, and media ==
=== Television ===
==== Game shows ====
- International versions of Wheel of Fortune, including:
  - Wheel of Fortune (Australian game show)
  - Wheel of Fortune (British game show)
  - Wheel of Fortune (New Zealand game show)
  - Wheel of Fortune (Philippine game show)
  - Wheel of Fortune India
- Wheel of Fortune (1952 game show), airing on CBS, unrelated to the 1975 show

==== Episodes ====
- "Wheel of Fortune", an episode of The A-Team season 4
- "The Wheel of Fortune", an episode of the 1965 Doctor Who serial The Crusade
- "Wheel of Fortune", an episode of The Dead Zone
- "Wheels of Fortune", a season 9 episode of Frasier

=== Games ===
- Big Six wheel, a casino game also known as the Wheel of Fortune
- Wheel of Fortune video games, based on the game show franchise
- Carcassonne: Wheel of Fortune, a tile-based board game

=== Literature ===
- The Wheel of Fortune (novel), 1984, by the English author Susan Howatch
- The Wheel of Fortune (play), 1795, by British writer Richard Cumberland

=== Music ===
- "Wheel of Fortune" (1951 song), originally performed by Johnny Hartman; popularized by Kay Starr
- "Wheel of Fortune" (Ace of Base song)
- "Wheel of Fortune" (Eiko Shimamiya song)
- "Wheels of Fortune" (song), first released in 1976 by the Doobie Brothers
- Wheel of Fortune, an album by Susan Raye
- Wheel of Fortune, an album by Robin Williamson and John Renbourn

=== Other ===
- The Wheel of Fortune (Burne-Jones), an 1883 painting

== Places ==
- Wheel of Fortune (house), listed on the U.S. National Register of Historic Places in Kent County, Delaware
- Wheel of Fortune, U.S. Virgin Islands, a settlement on the island of Saint Croix

== Other uses ==
- Wheel of Fortune (tarot card)
- Wheel of Fortune (horse), a British racehorse

== See also ==
- Wheel of Fortune and Fantasy, 2021 film
