= Minute to Win It (American game show) =

American TV game show

- Genre: Game show
- Created by: Mattias Olsson; Jock Millgårdh
- Written by: Bob Stone
- Directed by: Alan Carter
- Presented by: Guy Fieri; Apolo Ohno
- Country of origin: United States
- No. of seasons: 4 (2 on NBC, 2 on GSN)
- No. of episodes: NBC: 68; GSN: 40

Production
- Executive producers: NBC: Craig Plestis; Tim Puntillo; Mattias Olsson; Jock Millgårdh; Estelle Bodén; GSN: Michael Binkow; Eden Gaha; Paul Franklin
- Production locations: CBS Studio Center (2010-2011); Delfino Studios (2013-2014)
- Running time: 42–44 minutes
- Production companies: Universal Media Studios (2010–11); Universal Television (2011); Friday TV; Smart Dog Media; Shine America (2013–14)

Original release
- Network: NBC
- Release: March 14, 2010 – September 7, 2011
- Network: GSN
- Release: June 25, 2013 – April 29, 2014

Minute to Win It is an American television game show which features contestants playing simple games with common household items in an attempt to win a cash prize. The series originally ran on NBC with host Guy Fieri and was revived in 2013 on Game Show Network (GSN) with Apolo Ohno presenting the show.

The series premiered on NBC on March 14, 2010, airing the first two episodes back-to-back. A second season began on December 7, 2010. On May 13, 2012, NBC announced that the show would not be renewed for a third season. On February 4, 2013, GSN green-lit a revival of the series, and the first season began airing on June 25, 2013. A second season of the GSN version premiered on February 25, 2014.

== Gameplay ==
(A) Contestant(s) is/are presented with a blueprint for the first challenge (level) and must successfully complete a game within one minute to move past the first level and advance to the next level. The challenges are games that require contestants to perform tasks with various household items (such as releasing a balloon's air to blow a certain number of plastic cups off of a table, or rolling marbles at an upright-standing pencil in order to knock it over). Contestants who can complete all ten challenges win the show's top prize ($1,000,000 in the NBC version & $250,000 in the GSN version).

The difficulty of the games progressively increases throughout the show. If time expires or the conditions of the game cannot be fulfilled (such as exhausting any allotted attempts or breaking a rule), the contestant(s) lose(s) a "life", three of which are provided throughout the game. (A) Contestant(s) who lose(s) all three of their lives have their game end and their winnings drop to the previous milestone they passed. After successfully completing a game, contestants can leave with the amount of money already won before seeing the blueprint for their next level. If they elect to play the game, however, they cannot walk away until that level is complete or they have exhausted all three of their lives.

Episodes featuring celebrity contestants competing for charities and teams of two contestants tweak these rules slightly. In celebrity episodes, all levels are milestones, while in episodes featuring teams of two contestants, some games are played by both, while others are played solo and lives are shared between the two contestants with the same rules applying. A contestant can only make three consecutive attempts at solo games (including re-attempts following losing a life; an intervening team game does not reset this count). After a contestant makes three attempts, the other contestant is forced to attempt the next solo game.This rule was removed in season 2's produced episodes.

=== Special editions ===
Besides celebrity specials (with every level bankable) and editions featuring teams, other special editions have been conducted by the NBC version of the series. To begin the show's second season, three special Christmas-themed episodes were produced and aired in December 2010. Two extra games were added, with the 11th game worth $2,000,000 and the 12th game worth $3,000,000. In addition, some games contained a "Holiday Bonus," in which a contestant won a gift if the level is passed. A visual representation of the gift was placed inside of a box, which was opened if and when the level was successfully completed. The gifts included an extra life, an extra ten seconds to be used during a challenge, or a bonus prize.

The series also featured other episodes that featured twists to the regular format. In "Head to head" matches, two teams of two players compete against each other in a best-of-seven match. Winning a challenge earns the team a point; the first team to four points wins a guaranteed $50,000 and a chance to play for the million starting from Level 6 with three lives remaining. Some head-to-heads featured a best of three, with the winner starting at level 3(if two games were played) or 4(if three games were played). In "Last Man Standing" episodes, 10 contestants play against each other; the one with the worst result at the end of the challenge is eliminated. This continues until there is one contestant left. The winner wins $100,000 and plays a million-dollar game for a chance to win the top prize. In addition, during a few summer episodes, one member of the audience would be selected to play a million-dollar game towards the end of an episode.

=== Payout structure ===
Successfully completing a level is worth a specific cash prize. Contestants who successfully complete levels on milestones (prize amounts in bold) are guaranteed to leave with no less than the cash award at that level should they fail any later stunts. Gold indicates the top prize. Dark Green indicates that the challenge was the Christmas level 11 or 12 and a milestone.

Level	Value (NBC)	Value (GSN)
1	**$1,000**^{1}	
2	$2,500	$2,000
3	$5,000	$3,000
4	$10,000	$5,000
5	**$50,000**	**$10,000**
6	$75,000	$15,000
7	$125,000	**$25,000**
8	**$250,000**^{1}	$50,000
9	**$500,000**^{2}	$100,000
**10**	**$1,000,000**	**$250,000**
**11**	**$2,000,000**	N/A
**12**	**$3,000,000**	N/A

^{1}Added midway in season 1 of NBC version.

^{2}Added early in season 2.

== Production ==
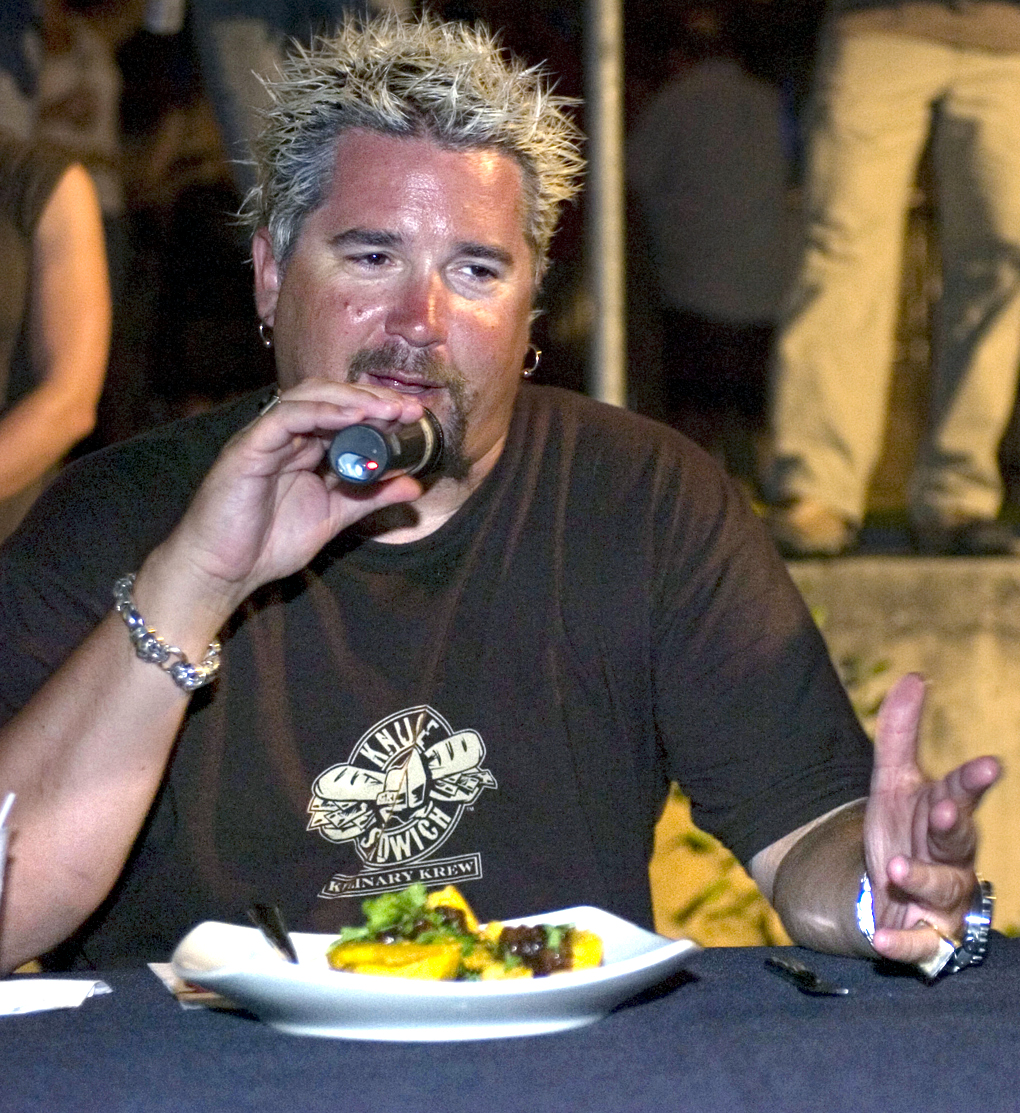
Guy Fieri, host of the original NBC version

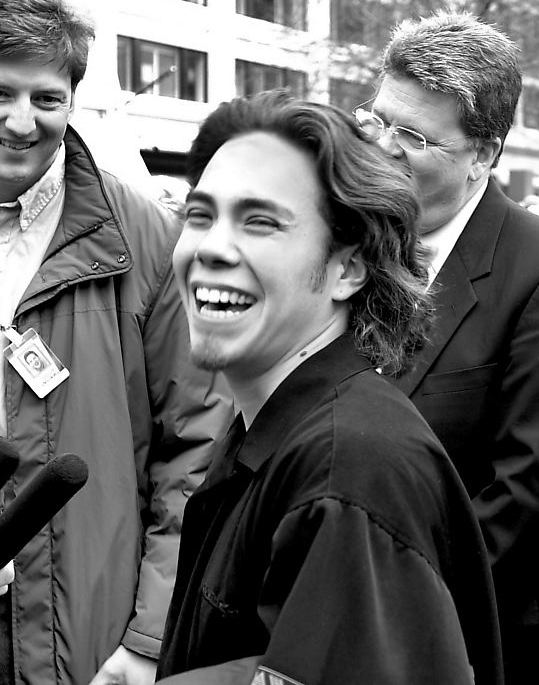
Apolo Ohno, host of the revived version on GSN

About two years before the series premiered on NBC, Guy Fieri's agent, who had attended a meeting in France, contacted him, pitching to him the idea of hosting the show. Fieri was eventually chosen to host the series, and the show premiered with two back-to-back episodes on March 14, 2010, airing 27 new episodes through September of that year. The second season, which consisted of 41 episodes, began on December 7, 2010, with a Christmas special. Executive producers for the NBC versions included Craig Plestis, Tim Puntillo, Mattias Olsson, Jock Millgårdh and Estelle Bodén. On May 13, 2012, NBC canceled the series, electing not to renew it for a third season.

Shortly after the NBC version's cancelation, reruns of Minute to Win It began airing on Game Show Network (GSN) July 24, 2012. Citing the NBC version's ratings success in reruns, the network announced plans to produce a revival of the series on February 4, 2013. The GSN version was hosted by American speed skating champion Apolo Ohno, with Michael Binkow serving as executive producer. The first season premiered on June 25, 2013, although a full episode sneak preview was shown on May 23, 2013. The series then went on a short hiatus, returning to air new episodes (advertised as a second season) February 25, 2014.

== Reception ==
In a pre-broadcast review, CinemaBlend's Kelly West praised Fieri's "enthusiastic" performance and his ability to interact well with contestants. West also noted that the show could do well with families and viewers who have a preference to non-intellectual game shows; however, West criticized the challenges for needing "little to no skill" to accomplish. In October 2010, Minute to Win It was awarded the C21/Frapa Award for best "studio based game show" format at the MIPCOM Television Festival in France.

Alyssa Davis of Hollywood Junket called the GSN version of the series "decent;" however, she also provided some slight criticism of Ohno's hosting, arguing that while "he is likable," his "personality is not strong enough to host a game show."

=== Ratings ===
The NBC version's ratings were generally average, with episodes toward both the beginning and end of the series' run generally earning between five and six million viewers. Ratings for the GSN version were slightly better than average for the network's standards. The May sneak preview earned 452,000 viewers, while the first two new episodes debuted to a combined total of 875,000 viewers, with 525,000 at 8:00 and 350,000 at 9:00. The GSN version would later climb to a series high of 596,000 viewers on August 6, 2013, while serving as a lead-in to the series premiere of The Chase.

== Merchandise ==
The first licensed merchandise for the series was a video game produced by Zoo Entertainment, which was released for the Nintendo DS, Wii, Kinect for Xbox 360, and iOS devices on November 2, 2010. In May 2011, NBCUniversal agreed to a deal with Wendy's allowing the restaurant to release kid's meal toys based on five challenges seen on the actual show. Other home versions based on the series' format include a board game and card game format of the show, both released by Mattel in 2011 and 2012, respectively, and an "Ultimate Party Pack" released by Sportscraft featuring many of the game's challenges. A summer and holiday activity guide were also released.

== See also ==
- Beat the Clock
- The Cube
