= Mai Whelan =

American reality television star

- Born: 1967 or 1968 (age 57–58); Saigon, Vietnam
- Occupations: Immigration adjudicator; naval officer
- Known for: Winning season 1 of Squid Game: The Challenge (2023)
- Spouse: Jay Whelan
- Children: 2
- Military career
- Allegiance: United States
- Branch: United States Navy
- Service years: 1985–2005
- Awards: Global War on Terrorism Service Medal; Navy Meritorious Unit Commendation; Navy E Ribbon

Mai Whelan, also known as Player 287, is an American retired immigration adjudicator for the Department of Homeland Security and a former petty officer for the United States Navy. She was the winner of the inaugural season of Squid Game: The Challenge (2023), with a grand prize of USD $4.56 million.

== Early life and career ==
Whelan was born in Vietnam and later moved to the United States after the fall of Saigon in 1975 at the age of eight as a refugee. She and her family lived at a resettlement center in Pennsylvania for 18 months, where they learned English and US culture. She became pregnant at the age of 19, resulting in being cut off from her family and becoming a single parent.

At the age of 18, she enlisted in the United States Navy, serving for twenty years, where she was awarded the Global War on Terrorism Service Medal, five Joint Service Achievement Medals, three Good Conduct Medals, two National Defense Service Medals, five Overseas Service Ribbons, a NATO Medal, four Sea Service Deployment Ribbons, a Navy E Ribbon, and a Meritorious Unit Commendation. She is also an Enlisted Aviation Warfare Specialist.

== Personal life ==
In 2023, she was living in Falls Church, Virginia, with her husband, two children, and one granddaughter. As of 2024, she lives in Swansboro, North Carolina, and is involved with the nonprofits Unbound, Humane Society of the United States, and the United Service Organizations.
