= The Chase New Zealand =

New Zealand game show

- Genre: Quiz show
- Based on: The Chase by: Danny Carvalho; et al.
- Presented by: Paul Henry
- Starring: Anne Hegerty; Issa Schultz
- Theme music composer: Paul Farrer
- Country of origin: New Zealand
- Original language: English
- No. of seasons: 1
- No. of episodes: 4

Production
- Production locations: NEP Studios Sydney, New South Wales
- Running time: 60 minutes (inc. adverts)
- Production company: ITV Studios Australia

Original release
- Network: TVNZ 1
- Release: 3 November – 24 November 2025

Related
- The Chase (UK); The Chase Australia

The Chase New Zealand was a New Zealand television quiz show based on the British series The Chase. The show ran for four episodes on TVNZ 1 from 3 to 24 November 2025. It was presented by Paul Henry, with Anne Hegerty and Issa Schultz as chasers.

== Background ==
The Chase premiered on ITV in the United Kingdom in 2009. The British version is shown in New Zealand, and according to British chaser Paul Sinha, is more popular there than in its home country. In 2021, the British series averaged audiences of 313,800 in New Zealand.

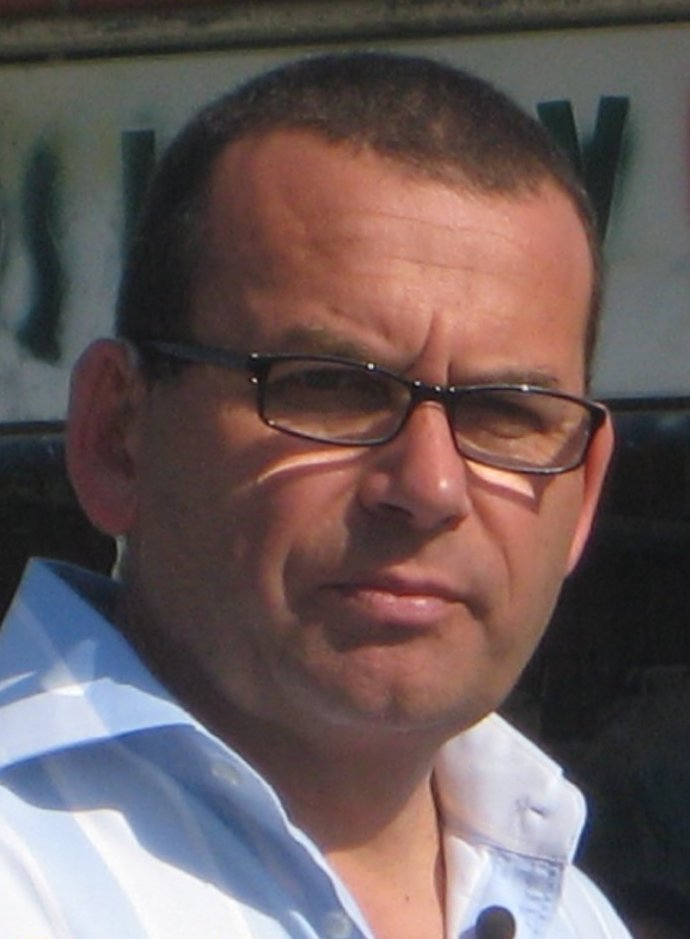
Paul Henry in 2008

According to Brian McDonnell, an honorary research fellow at Massey University, New Zealand audiences like the British series because they support the underdog contestants and admire host Bradley Walsh, despite not being able to answer British-centred questions. Speaking at a point when the British series had aired over 1,800 episodes, McDonnell said that New Zealand's population was too small to support The Chase format for itself. In July 2022, James Croot of Stuff predicted that The Chase would never be adapted for New Zealand, citing a shift in the country towards shows like The Weakest Link and Are You Smarter than a 10 Year Old? that humiliated contestants rather than celebrated them.

On 8 April 2025, a New Zealand version of The Chase was announced by TVNZ, to be filmed by ITV Studios Australia at the Australian version's set in Sydney and broadcast as a four-part series. It is the 22nd territory for The Chase. Contestants had to provide their own travel to and accommodation in Australia.

Paul Henry was announced as presenter on 3 June. On 8 October, the show's two chasers were announced as British chaser "The Governess" Anne Hegerty and Australian chaser "The Supernerd" Issa Schultz, both veterans of the Australian series. Hegerty said that she made little research into New Zealand-centred general knowledge and was aiming to rely on what she had studied for the Australian series. After watching the first episode, which Hegerty won, Stuff writer Shahra Hume wrote that Hegerty's comparative lack of New Zealand-focused general knowledge was compensated by her knowledge in other areas.

== Gameplay ==
A team of four strangers take on a trivia expert, the Chaser. The contestant is given one minute in a cash-building round, in which they are awarded NZ$2,000 for each correct answer.

In the head-to-head round, the contestant must choose to start three steps away from the Chaser for the amount of money they earned in the cash builder, or two steps away for a higher offer suggested by the Chaser, or four steps away for a lower offer. The contestant and the Chaser are faced with multiple-choice questions, for which a correct answer moves them forward. If the Chaser lands on the contestant's step, the contestant is out and leaves with nothing; if the contestant reaches the end, the money is banked.

The contestants who reached the end take part in the final chase, in which they are asked questions for two minutes, winning another step for each correct answer. The Chaser is then asked questions for the same amount of time and aims to catch the contestants. If the Chaser gets a question wrong, the clock is frozen and the contestants have the opportunity to answer, being able to push the Chaser back one step if they are correct. If the Chaser catches them in the final, they leave with nothing; if they outrun the Chaser, the contestants split the total winnings between themselves.

== Chasers ==
- Anne Hegerty. Known as "The Governess", appeared twice on Mastermind, Fifteen to One, Today's the Day, Brain of Britain, and Are You an Egghead?. Hegerty is also a Chaser on the British and Australian versions of the show.
- Issa Schultz. Known as "The Supernerd", 11-time winner of the Australian Quizzing Championships and seven-time pairs champion. Appeared on Australian game shows The Rich List, Who Wants to Be a Millionaire? and The Einstein Factor. Schultz is also a Chaser on the Australian version of the show and was a guest on the British version of the spin-off series, Beat the Chasers.

== Reception ==
Stuff writers Karanama Ruru and Shahra Hume considered some questions – such as on the name of the current prime minister of New Zealand, the soap opera Shortland Street, and the Treaty of Waitangi – to be too easy, and speculated that they were written by Australians. Kylie Klein Nixon of The Post considered Henry to not be as likeable a host as Walsh.
