= David Poltorak =

Australian game show champion (born 1954/1955)

- Born: 1954 or 1955 (age 70–71)
- Occupations: Scriptwriter; quiz show champion; former taxi driver
- Known for: Winning Sale of the Century (1986); Scriptwriter of Emoh Ruo (1985) The Chase Australia (2024–present)

David Poltorak (born 1954/1955) is an Australian television game show contestant and question writer. He became the grand champion of Sale of the Century in 1986, setting a world record for winnings on a television game show at the time. He later worked as a question writer for The Oz Game, Sale of the Century, The Einstein Factor, Temptation, Who Wants to Be a Millionaire? and Millionaire Hot Seat. Nicknamed The Professor, he has been featured as a chaser on The Chase Australia since 2024.

== Early life ==
Poltorak has been interested in game shows since he was a child, watching BP Pick-a-Box as a 10-year-old. He decided to enter Coles' $6,000 Question at 16, with World War I as his subject as there was a magazine series on it for sale at the time.

Poltorak had aspirations to be a scriptwriter and co-wrote the 1985 film Emoh Ruo, and was a member of a theatresports team. He was a part-time taxi driver before he applied for Sale of the Century in 1986 at 31 years of age. Although he had a taxi license, which he gained in 1976, he eventually only spent three months on the road before realising driving was not for him.

== Sale of the Century ==
Poltorak appeared on eight episodes of the Australian version of Sale of the Century in 1986, winning a grand total of A$376,200, including $244,000 in cash and $132,200 in prizes. His total winnings were a world record for a television game show at the time, surpassing the previous record held by Michael Larson on Press Your Luck in 1984.

Poltorak also set three records for Sale of the Century in Australia:

- Highest number of questions answered correctly in one episode: 35 out of 55 (episode 1443).
- Highest winning score: $200 (episode 1443).
- Most number of questions answered correctly in 60 second fast money: 16 (episode 1443).

== Question writing ==
In 1989, Poltorak was employed as the head question writer and adjudicator for the third season of the ABC's then-6 pm game show The Oz Game. In 1991, Poltorak replaced Fran Powell as the question writer and adjudicator for Sale of the Century, after an offer from the game show's production company, Grundy Television. He remained in this role until the show's cancellation in 2001. He then joined the question writing team for Temptation, The Einstein Factor, Who Wants to Be a Millionaire? in Australia, and later for its spin-off Millionaire Hot Seat.

== The Chase Australia ==
In October 2023, it was reported that Poltorak will debut as a new chaser nicknamed "The Professor" on The Chase Australia in 2024. Poltorak previously appeared as a contestant in the first series of Beat the Chasers Australia in 2020. His Chaser debut on The Chase Australia aired on 8 April 2024.
