= Cheryl Toh =

Australian television personality

- Born: 1979 or 1980; Australia
- Other name: "Tiger Mum"
- Education: University of Adelaide
- Occupations: Quizzer, television personality, lawyer
- Years active: 2015–present
- Known for: The Chase Australia (2019–2025)
- Spouse: Jason (m. 2003)
- Children: 2

Cheryl Toh is an Australian lawyer, television personality, quiz champion and has served as one of the six "Chasers" on The Chase Australia television quiz show from January 2019 to November 2025.

Toh joined The Chase Australia as one of the six Chasers in January 2019, alongside Mark Labbett, Issa Schultz, Brydon Coverdale, Anne Hegerty and Matt Parkinson. In 2020 she appeared as one of the four Australian Chasers on the local version of Chase spin-off Beat The Chasers Australia.

Referred to as "Tiger Mum" on The Chase, Toh has said, "My family likes the nickname. It was either me or my father who first suggested it. Many women, especially in the Asian community, regard it as a compliment to be called a 'tiger mum'. For me, I am having a bit of a laugh at myself."

Prior to The Chase Australia, Toh appeared on The Einstein Factor in 2007 – her special subject was the TV series Agatha Christie's Poirot. Fellow Chaser Matt Parkinson appears on the Brains Trust in the same episode.

In 2015, Toh won $75,000 on Million Dollar Minute. She progressed to play for $200,000 but failed to make it to the final game and left with her $75,000 of safety net winnings.
