= Beat the Chasers =

British spin-off television quiz show

- Genre: Game show
- Presented by: Bradley Walsh
- Starring: Darragh Ennis Anne Hegerty Mark Labbett Jenny Ryan Paul Sinha Shaun Wallace Issa Schultz (guest) Joe Pasquale (guest)
- Theme music composer: Paul Farrer
- Country of origin: United Kingdom
- Original language: English
- No. of series: 7
- No. of episodes: 52

Production
- Production companies: Potato (2020–2026); Bright Entertainment (2026–present)

Original release
- Network: ITV
- Release: 27 April 2020 – present

Related
- The Chase

Beat the Chasers (stylised in start case, also known as The Super Chase in other countries) is a 2020 British television quiz show broadcast on the ITV network. The show is a spin-off of the British game show The Chase. International versions of the show have been broadcast in other countries.

== Gameplay ==
A single contestant plays, answering a series of multiple-choice questions worth £1,000 each. The round ends once they either miss a question or get five right. They must then decide how many Chasers from two to five to face in a timed head-to-head round, with the Chasers specifying a time limit for themselves (always less than 60 seconds) and offering larger cash prizes as an incentive to face more of them. The offer to face two Chasers is always equal to the amount earned in the Cash Builder. For Series 4 through 6, any contestant who answers all five Cash Builder questions correctly is presented with a fifth "Super Offer" to face all six Chasers at once, with no time advantage and an even larger cash prize. The Super Offer was not presented in Series 7.

The contestant's clock is set to 60 seconds, while the Chasers' clock is set to their agreed-on time. Only one clock runs at any given moment, starting with the contestant; the side in control must answer a question correctly to stop their clock and turn control over to the opposing side. The Chasers must buzz in to respond and may not confer on any questions, and any response given by a Chaser who has not buzzed in is automatically ruled wrong. The contestant wins the money on offer if the Chasers' clock runs out first, or nothing if their own clock runs out first.

== Production ==
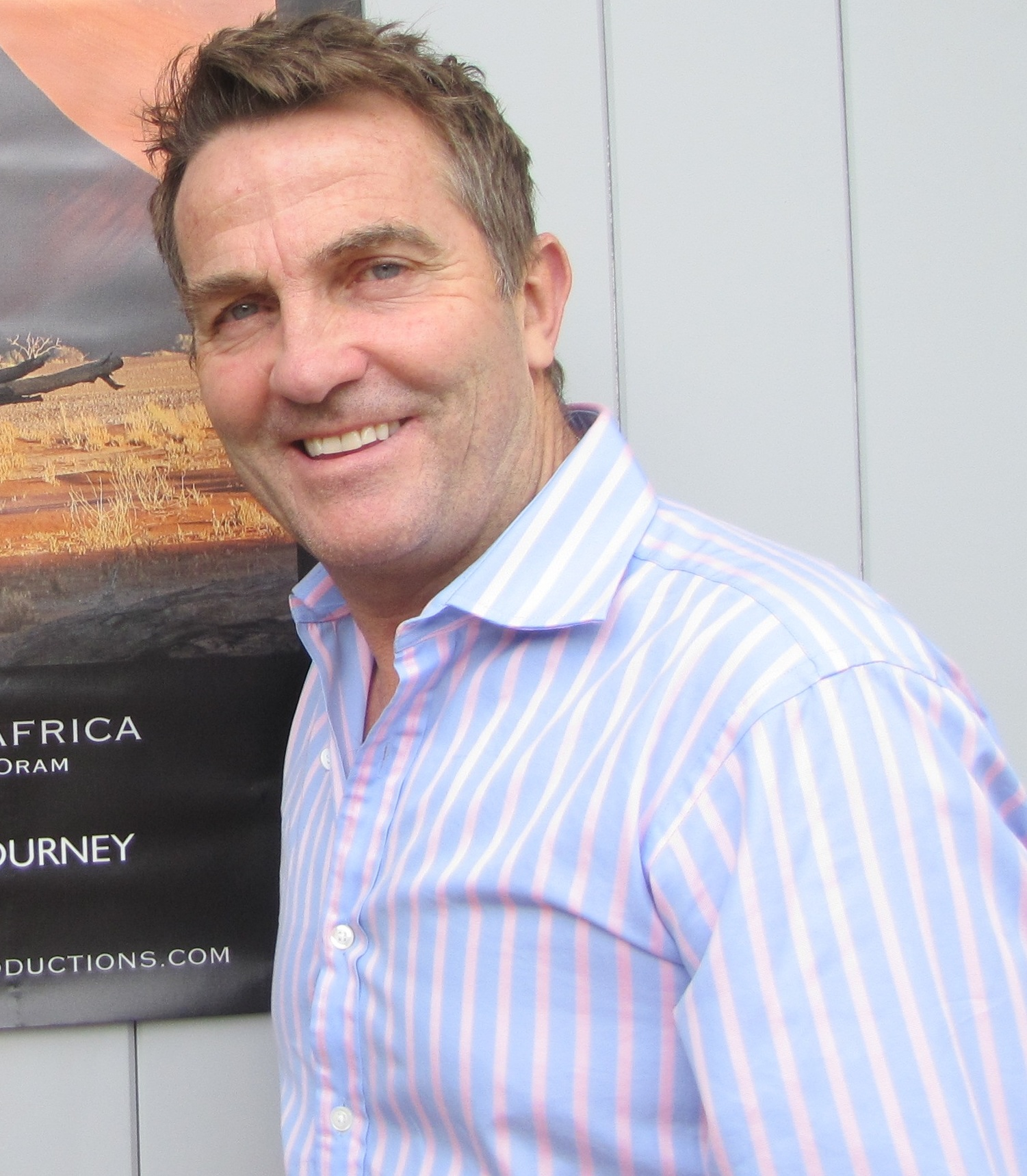
Bradley Walsh, presenter of the show

In November 2019, ITV commissioned another spin-off called Beat the Chasers. It began airing in prime-time on 27 April 2020 and features contestants attempting to beat up to five Chasers to win big cash prizes. The Chasers that featured in the show were Sinha, Labbett, Ryan, Hegerty and Wallace.

Series 2 of Beat the Chasers commenced airing on 3 January 2021, and continued consecutively for seven nights, excluding 9 January, until 10 January 2021. Due to the COVID-19 pandemic, the second series featured no studio audience.

Series 3 was commissioned by ITV. The network had originally intended to have all six Chasers participate in this series; however, these plans had to be postponed as Paul Sinha was absent due to illness. The series began with a celebrity special on 27 March 2021 and once again featured no studio audience.

Series 4 was commissioned by ITV, and premiered on 11 September 2021 with all six Chasers participating for the first time. It also saw the return of the studio audience and the return of Paul Sinha. This series introduced a "Super Offer", available only to contestants who answered all five of their Cash Builder questions correctly. This offer was presented in conjunction with the other four and gave the contestant a chance to play against all six Chasers at once, with no time advantage and a larger cash prize than that offered for facing five Chasers. The "Super Offer" feature was absent during series 7, with several contestants answering all 5 questions correctly, but not being given the option.

Series 5 went into production in March 2022 and premiered on 16 May 2022. Hegerty was absent from the regular episodes of this series (Episodes 1–5) due to a positive COVID-19 test and was replaced by guest Chaser Issa "The Supernerd" Schultz from The Chase Australia. Hegerty returned for the celebrity specials (Episodes 6–7) which were filmed as part of Series 6 in May 2023.

Series 7 commenced filming in June 2025, and premiered on 31 August 2025. The finale episode featured a new mystery chaser, who was later revealed as Joe Pasquale temporarily covering for Ennis, who was absent due to a family bereavement.

Series 8 was commissioned by ITV in late 2025, for broadcast in 2026.

The original working title for the spin-off show was Take On the Chasers. The theme tune was composed by Paul Farrer using part of the original 2009 Chaser walk-on music.

In August 2020, Seven Network announced that an Australian version of Beat The Chasers would be produced.

== Reception ==
Barbara Speed of The i Paper found the chasers and contestants to be entertaining, but noted the lack of the teamwork seen on The Chase. She predicted that the first series's broadcasting every day of the week would become repetitive. Ian Hyland of the Daily Mirror wrote that the show was nearly as "exhilarating" as its parent, and believed it would draw audience's attention for the week, and then be renewed. Hyland was surprised that the show's post-watershed timeslot did not lead to more of the innuendo that The Chase was noted for. James Croot of the website Stuff in New Zealand, where the show is broadcast on TVNZ 1, wrote a positive review ranking the series as better than the Family edition but not as entertaining as the Celebrity edition of The Chase.

Robyn Free, a 72-year-old contestant who was having chemotherapy, took part while sat in a chair. After she won £40,000, she jumped in celebration and walked off stage; Walsh commented "She scammed us all". Free later said that she was unable to stand for ten minutes, but felt an "adrenalin rush". She asked for an apology from Walsh. In 2024, viewers criticised ITV for showing a repeat of the episode featuring Free, who had since died.

== Series overview ==
Series	Episodes	Originally released	
Series	Episodes	First released	Last released
1	5	27 April 2020	1 May 2020
2	7	3 January 2021	10 January 2021
3	7	27 March 2021	29 May 2021
4	9	11 September 2021	9 May 2024
5	7	16 May 2022	19 January 2024
6	9	8 October 2023	20 February 2025
7	8	31 August 2025	19 October 2025
8	TBA	TBA	TBA

== International versions ==
Legend: Currently airing No longer airing Upcoming

Country	Local title	Channel(s)	Presenter(s)	Chaser(s)	Cash Builder question value	Premiere date	End date
Australia	Beat the Chasers Australia	Seven Network	Andrew O'Keefe	Brydon Coverdale; Issa Schultz; Cheryl Toh; Matt Parkinson	AU$1,000 (Normal); AU$5,000 (Tournament games)	1 November 2020	29 November 2020
Croatia	Superpotjera (The Super Chase)	HRT 1	Joško Lokas	Dean Kotiga; Morana Zibar; Krešimir Sučević-Međeral; Mladen Vukorepa; Sven Marcelić	€500	26 March 2023	
Cyprus	Beat the Chasers	Alpha TV Cyprus	Tasos Tryfonos	Andreas Pitsillides; Marinos Kleanthous; Sylia Ioannidou	€250	4 October 2026	
Czech Republic	Superlov (The Super Chase)	TV Nova	Ondřej Sokol	Dagmar Jandová; Jakub Kvášovský; Jiří Martínek; Václav Slabyhoudek (season 1-2); Viktorie Mertová; Libor Šimůnek (season 1-3)	5,000 Kč	4 March 2023	
Finland	Super-Jahti (The Super Chase)	MTV3	Mikko Leppilampi	Eero Ylitalo; Magnus Mali; Markus Leikola	€500	5 February 2021	20 July 2021
Germany	Gefragt – Gejagt: Allein gegen Alle (Asked – Chased: Alone versus All)	Das Erste	Alexander Bommes	Adriane Rickel; Annegret Schenkel; Klaus Otto Nagorsnik; Manuel Hobiger; Sebastian Jacoby; Sebastian Klussmann; Thomas Kinne	€500	17 October 2022	
Netherlands	Beat the Champions	RTL4	Chantal Janzen	Diederik Jekel (2021–2023); Cindy Hemink (2021–2023); Abel Gilsing (2021–2024); Nynke de Jong (2021–2024); Devrim Aslan (2021–2024); Anna Gimbrère (2024); Andries Tunru (2024)	€500	3 January 2021	28 April 2024
Serbia	Суперпотера; Superpotera (The Super Chase)	RTS1	Jovan Memedović	Žarko Stevanović; Milica Jokanović; Milan Bukvić; Dušan Macura; Aleksa Stefanović (September 2026-)	20,000 din.	8 March 2025	
Spain	La Noche de los Cazadores (The Night of Hunters)	La 1	Ion Aramendi (Season 1); Rodrigo Vázquez (Season 2)	Erundino Alonso; Paz Herrera; Ruth de Andrés; Lilit Manukyan; David Leo García	€1,000	17 January 2022	20 September 2022
