= Weakest Link (Australian game show) =

Australian television quiz show

- Genre: Game show
- Based on: The Weakest Link by: Fintan Coyle; Cathy Dunning
- Presented by: Cornelia Frances (2001–02); Magda Szubanski (2021–22)
- Narrated by: Marcus Irvine
- Composer: Paul Farrer
- Country of origin: Australia
- Original language: English
- No. of series: 2 (Seven Network, 2001–02); 1 (Nine Network, 2021–22)
- No. of episodes: Approx. 120 (Seven Network); 14 (Nine Network)

Production
- Production locations: Melbourne, Victoria
- Running time: 60 minutes
- Production companies: Original: Red Heart; Seven Network; Revival: BBC Studios Australia & New Zealand; Nine Network

Original release
- Network: Seven Network
- Release: 5 February 2001 – 22 April 2002
- Network: Nine Network
- Release: 25 May 2021 – 1 February 2022

The Weakest Link (also known as The Weakest Link Australia) is an Australian game show based on the British format of the same name that aired from 5 February 2001 until 22 April 2002 and was originally broadcast on the Seven Network. Presented by Cornelia Frances, the show featured nine contestants competing for a potential prize of $100,000. Airing twice weekly in primetime, on Mondays and Thursdays (in Melbourne, Adelaide and Perth, later extended to nationwide following the conclusion of the 2001 AFL season) or Fridays (in Sydney and Brisbane), it received modest ratings until its cancellation in April 2002. The show was produced in the Seven Network's South Melbourne headquarters.

A revival of the show with actress Magda Szubanski as host was announced for the Nine Network, airing from 25 May 2021 to 1 February 2022. TVNZ 1 aired the revival in New Zealand.

== Format ==
=== 2001–02 ===
The format of the Seven Network iteration was identical to that of the British version apart from some slight time differences on rounds. The 1st round lasted for 2 minutes and 30 seconds as opposed to 3 minutes on the British version, and each round thereafter was reduced by 10 seconds (meaning a time limit of 80 seconds for the triple stakes round). As with the British version, any money banked in round 8 was trebled (e.g. if the contestants bank $1,000 then $3,000 is added to the final total). The money tree was as follows:

Question	Prize
9	$10,000
8	$8,000
7	$6,000
6	$4,500
5	$3,000
4	$2,000
3	$1,000
2	$500
1	$200

The voice-over was Marcus Irvine, while the adjudicator and question researcher was Alan Mason, the contestant revealed as The Mole in 2000.

The money tree is the same figures as in the British version, but ten times larger, and in Australian dollars rather than pound sterling.

=== 2021–22 ===
The format of the Nine Network iteration saw some major changes to the format; similar to the 2020 US revival, eight contestants (as opposed to nine on the original Seven Network iteration) begin the game, and play begins with the player in the first position (as opposed to the player whose name is first alphabetically). The top prize increases in each round, making for a potential top prize of A$250,000. Additionally, the contestants are interrogated about their roundly performances before the revealing of votes, as opposed to afterwards. As is convention, in the event of a tie, the strongest link casts the deciding vote. After round six, the game moves straight to the final round; if the strongest link in the preceding round had been voted off, the second-strongest link decides who receives the first question.

Question	Prize					
Question	1	2	3	4	5	6
8	$10,000	$15,000	$20,000	$30,000	$75,000	$100,000
7	$5,000	$7,500	$10,000	$15,000	$50,000	$75,000
6	$3,000	$5,000	$7,500	$10,000	$25,000	$50,000
5	$1,500	$3,000	$5,000	$7,500	$15,000	$25,000
4	$750	$1,500	$2,500	$5,000	$7,500	$10,000
3	$500	$1,000	$1,500	$2,500	$5,000	
2	$250	$500	$750	$1,000	$1,500	$2,500
1	$100	$200	$250	$500	$750	$1,000

Additionally, several minor additions to the game were introduced:

- A buzzer was added to each contestant's podium. It is used both to bank money (contestants not only have to say the word "bank" before being asked the question but must also press the buzzer), as well as to reveal the contestant's vote at the end of each round.
- A touch screen was also added to each contestant's podium. It is used to present visual information for visual questions – where the host asks the contestants to identify items that appear on the screen – as well as to cast their vote for the weakest link at the end of each round.

== Special Editions ==
The show also featured several special editions throughout its run.

=== Seven Network iteration (2001–02) ===
- On 11 March 2002, a special episode included contestants from reality game show The Mole, as part of the show's third season. The episode featured the remaining nine players participating in a game of The Weakest Link as part of a challenge on The Mole, with the winner earning immunity from the next elimination and the money won going to the kitty - the grand prize of The Mole. Bob Young defeated Thao Nguyen in the final round. The prize money, $14,100, was the lowest amount won in any Australian episode of the Weakest Link, but the money and free pass were only awarded after it was proven that the contestants did not cheat backstage (after all contestants were left in the waiting room with a folder containing the question and answer sheet). On The Mole, the prize money was rounded up to $15,000 as all money amounts were rounded up to the nearest $1,000. This episode was watched by a nationwide audience of 1.312 million, a little bit under what Who Wants to Be a Millionaire? achieved that night, with 1.51 million.
- On 9 August 2001, a Blue Heelers special of the show aired. John Wood, Neil Pigot, Ditch Davey, Jeremy Kewley, Jane Allsop, Suzi Dougherty, Paul Bishop, Caroline Craig and Peta Doodson all participated. In that episode, there was a round where nothing was banked.
- On 26 November 2001, an All Saints special of the show was televised. Ben Tari, Joy Smithers, Martin Lynes, Georgie Parker, Conrad Coleby, Judith McGrath, Erik Thomson (who won the special), Ling Hsueh Tang and Josh Quong Tart all participated.
- On 27 September 2001, a special football edition of the show aired, two days before the Seven Network televised the 2001 AFL Grand Final. Contestants included St Kilda fullback Max Hudghton, future Brisbane Lions triple-premiership player (and future coach of the club) Justin Leppitsch, North Melbourne player David King and Melbourne Storm foundation player Rodney Howe, who won $46,300, which he subsequently donated to the Cancer Council of Victoria.
- On 27 August 2001, a special edition made up of contestants from the first season of Big Brother in Australia aired. In this episode, Gordon Sloan defeated Anita Bloomfield in the final and won $31,600. The episode was the highest-rated show of the week.
- Other celebrities to have participated on The Weakest Link included, among others, Cornelia Frances' Home and Away colleague and actress Ada Nicodemou, talk show host Andrew Denton, Scott McGregor, Kimberley Cooper, Tom Williams, Warwick Capper, Michael Caton, Monica Trapaga and Shelley Craft.
- The "Worst Loser Special" featured eliminated contestants from previous episodes, normally those who lost in early rounds or who lost in the final round.
- There were two editions featuring teams made up of winners of previous episodes. In the latter of these, subtitled "The Best of the Best", a record $72,900 prize money was won. The highest amount won in a standard episode was $56,300, whilst the lowest was $14,800.

=== Nine Network iteration (2021–22) ===
- The first episode of Nine's iteration saw the team bank a grand prize of $14,300 – at the time the lowest for a regular episode of the show across both versions (despite the potential for a higher prize on Nine’s version). This record was broken in a later episode with a final bank of $10,750.
- A Christmas special featured unsuccessful contestants from previous episodes returning to compete against each other.

== Notable contestants ==
=== Original series (Seven Network) ===
- Brydon Coverdale – he went on to win $307,000 on Million Dollar Minute and as of February 2024, is one of the Chasers on The Chase Australia, where he is nicknamed "The Shark".

== Reception ==
=== Nine's iteration ===
The first episode of the Nine Network's iteration of the show scored a nationwide audience of 423,000.

== Awards ==
Awards and nominations for The Weakest Link
Year	Award	Category	Nominee(s)	Result	Ref.
2002	Logie Awards	Most Popular Game Show	The Weakest Link	Nominated	

== See also ==
- Shafted
- Who Wants to Be a Millionaire?
  - Millionaire Hot Seat
- Deal or No Deal
- The Master
- It's Academic
- The Chase Australia
- Tipping Point Australia
- Million Dollar Minute
- Go Go Stop
