= Behave Yourself! (TV series) =

Australian comedy game show

- Genre: Game show
- Created by: Chris Culvenor
- Presented by: Darren McMullen
- Country of origin: Australia
- Original language: English
- No. of series: 1
- No. of episodes: 10

Production
- Running time: 60 minutes
- Production company: Eureka Productions

Original release
- Network: Seven Network
- Release: 4 July 2017 – 14 January 2020

Behave Yourself! is an Australian comedy game show which premiered on 4 July 2017 on the Seven Network. The series was produced by Eureka Productions and hosted by Darren McMullen. It featured comedians and celebrities competing to guess human responses and behaviour, based on experiments of behavioural expert and author Dan Ariely.

== Cast ==
=== Host ===
- Darren McMullen

=== Guests ===
- Anthony Lehmann
- Arj Barker
- Ash Pollard
- Barry Hall
- Ben Mingay
- Bonnie Lythgoe
- Brendan Fevola
- Cal Wilson
- Chloe Esposito
- Christie Whelan Browne
- Claire Hooper
- Denise Scott
- Ella Hooper
- Emily Taheny
- Gina Liano
- Guy Sebastian
- Heath Franklin
- Issa Schultz
- Jason Byrne
- Kate Langbroek
- Kerri-Anne Kennerley
- Kris Smith
- Larry Emdur
- Lawrence Mooney
- Liesel Jones
- Lucy Durack
- Matt Little
- Matt Parkinson
- Merv Hughes
- Michala Banas
- Natalie Bassingthwaighte
- Nazeem Hussain
- Nikki Osborne
- Sam Frost
- Shane Warne
- Stephen K. Amos
- Tegan Higginbotham
- Tim Ross
- Tom Ballard
- Virginia Gay

== Episodes ==
Note: The winning team is listed in bold

| Episode No. | Team 1 | Team 2 | Team 3 | Score | Original air date | Viewers (millions) |
|---|---|---|---|---|---|---|
| 1 | Claire Hooper and Ben Mingay | Kate Langbroek and Shane Warne | **Emily Taheny and Lawrence Mooney** | 8–11–**16** | 4 July 2017 | 0.791 |
| 2 | Arj Barker and Kris Smith | Claire Hooper and Guy Sebastian | **Christie Whelan Browne and Lawrence Mooney** | 8–11–**14** | 11 July 2017 | 0.768 |
| 3 | Heath Franklin and Bonnie Lythgoe | Claire Hooper and Larry Emdur | **Lucy Durack and Lawrence Mooney** | 7–9–**12** | 18 July 2017 | 0.743 |
| 4 | **Heath Franklin and Liesel Jones** | Tim Ross and Michala Banas | Shane Warne and Lawrence Mooney | **9**–8–4 | 18 October 2017 | —N/a (Note: Program not within published Top 20 rated programs for the night) |
| 5 | Anthony Lehmann and Natalie Bassingthwaite | Kris Smith and Michala Banas | Matt Little and Lawrence Mooney | Unknown | 3 December 2019 | —N/a |
| 6 | Cal Wilson and Matt Parkinson | **Denise Scott and Brendan Fevola** | Nikki Osborne and Lawrence Mooney | 11–**13**–8 | 10 December 2019 | —N/a |
| 7 | **Stephen K. Amos and Ella Hooper** | Claire Hooper and Barry Hall | Kerri-Anne Kennerley and Lawrence Mooney | **11**–9–10 | 17 December 2019 | —N/a |
| 8 | Chloe Esposito and Jason Byrne | Nazeem Hussain and Michala Banas | **Gina Liano and Lawrence Mooney** | 10–6–**13** | 31 December 2019 | —N/a |
| 9 | Tom Ballard and Sam Frost | Claire Hooper and Issa Schultz | **Ash Pollard and Lawrence Mooney** | 11–16–**17** | 7 January 2020 | —N/a |
| 10 | **Tom Ballard and Virginia Gay** | Tegan Higginbotham and Merv Hughes | Sam Frost and Lawrence Mooney | **14**–10–10 | 14 January 2020 | —N/a |

== Ratings ==
| No. | Title | Air date | Overnight ratings | | Consolidated ratings | | Total viewers | Ref(s) |
| No. | Title | Air date | Viewers | Rank | Viewers | Rank | Total viewers | Ref(s) |
|---|---|---|---|---|---|---|---|---|
| 1 | Episode 1 | 4 July 2017 | 510,000 | 18 | 81,000 | 15 | 791,000 | |
| 2 | Episode 2 | 11 July 2017 | 734,000 | 17 | 34,000 | 17 | 568,000 | |
| 3 | Episode 3 | 18 July 2017 | 743,000 | >20 | —N/a | —N/a | 743,000 | |
| 4 | Episode 4 | 18 October 2017 | —N/a | —N/a | —N/a | —N/a | —N/a | |
| 5 | Episode 5 | 3 December 2019 | —N/a | —N/a | —N/a | —N/a | —N/a | |
| 6 | Episode 6 | 10 December 2019 | —N/a | —N/a | —N/a | —N/a | —N/a | |
| 7 | Episode 7 | 17 December 2019 | —N/a | —N/a | —N/a | —N/a | —N/a | |
| 8 | Episode 8 | 31 December 2019 | —N/a | —N/a | —N/a | —N/a | —N/a | |
| 9 | Episode 9 | 7 January 2020 | —N/a | —N/a | —N/a | —N/a | —N/a | |
| 10 | Episode 10 | 14 January 2020 | —N/a | —N/a | —N/a | —N/a | —N/a | |
