= Crown and Andrews =

Australian game manufacturer

- Founded: 1961; 65 years ago in Melbourne, Australia
- Founder: Gerry Crown and Vic Andrews
- Headquarters: North Rocks, New South Wales, Australia
- Website: www.crownandandrews.com

Crown and Andrews is an Australian game manufacturer. It makes board games, educational games, wooden puzzles, Rubiks puzzles and jigsaw puzzles.

In June 2014, Crown and Andrews was acquired by Goliath Games, a Dutch business.

== TV shows board games ==
Crown and Andrews has made many board games licensed from TV shows, some of them are listed below:

- Deal or No Deal
- Bert's Family Feud
- Beyond 2000
- Wheel of Fortune
- The Price is Right
- Sale of the Century/Temptation
- Neighbours
- Now You See It
- Who Wants to be a Millionaire
- The Biggest Loser
- The Chase Australia

== Games for children ==
- Robodoc
- Sharky's Dinners
- Hoppit!
- The Frog Prince Game
- The Tooth Fairy Game
- Balance the Bone Game
- Itsy Bitsy Spider
- Children's Charades
- Naughty Dogs
- Fairytale Charms Game
- Breakfast Cereal Monopoly
- Choose That Song
- Teddy Tells Game
- Bunny Hop
- Woof Woof Game
- Swat That Fly
- Pass The Parcel
- Sshh! Don't Wake Dad!
- Match 2
- Hedbanz for Kids
- Dinosaurs
- Rumble in the Jungle
- Musical Chairs
- Super Cricket
- Test Match Cricket
- Crunching Crocodile
- Shop´ Til You Drop
- Snakes and Ladders
- Pig Goes Pop!
- Hot Potato
