= The Chase Australia =

Australian television quiz show

- Title card
- Genre: Quiz show
- Based on: The Chase by: Danny Carvalho; et al.
- Directed by: Ian Hamilton; Stuart McDonald
- Creative director: Michael Kelpie
- Presented by: Andrew O'Keefe (2015-2021); Larry Emdur; (2021-present)
- Starring: Brydon Coverdale; Anne Hegerty; Matt Parkinson; Issa Schultz; Mark Labbett; Shaun Wallace; Cheryl Toh; Mara Lejins; Brandon Blackwell; David Poltorak
- Theme music composer: Paul Farrer
- Country of origin: Australia
- Original language: English
- No. of seasons: 17
- No. of episodes: 1,632

Production
- Executive producers: Sue Allison; Martin Scott
- Producers: Jennifer Stephenson; David Hall
- Production locations: Global Television studios, South Melbourne, Victoria (2015–2020); Docklands Studios Melbourne, Victoria (Celebrity Specials); NEP Studios Sydney, New South Wales (2020–present)
- Running time: 60 minutes (inc. adverts)
- Production company: ITV Studios Australia

Original release
- Network: Seven Network
- Release: 14 September 2015 – present

Related
- The Chase (UK); The Chase (U.S.)

The Chase Australia is an Australian television quiz show based on the British program of the same name. It is broadcast on the Seven Network and premiered on 14 September 2015. Four contestants play against an opponent, known as the "chaser", who plays for the bank.. The Chase (Australia) was originally hosted by Andrew O'Keefe until July 2021, when he was replaced by Larry Emdur. The series began with Brydon Coverdale, Anne Hegerty, Matt Parkinson and Issa Schultz as chasers, with Mark Labbett joining in 2016. Shaun Wallace appeared as a guest chaser in 2018, and Cheryl Toh has appeared as a chaser from 2019 to 2025. Mara Lejins joined as a chaser in 2022, and David Poltorak joined in 2024. Brandon Blackwell also appeared as a guest in 2024.

The series has also spawned a prime-time celebrity series, and a spin-off called Beat The Chasers.

The largest amount of money ever won by people on The Chase is $141,000 split between 4 people ($35,250 per player), while the lowest amount ever won was $400, won by a single player who won the full $400.

== History ==
In mid-2014 TV Tonight reported that Seven Network had considered producing a local version of The Chase on the back of good ratings for the British version of the show which has been airing in the 3:00 pm timeslot since August 2013. A pilot episode on the UK set was made, but ultimately it was decided not to proceed.

However, interest in a local version was renewed in May 2015 and in July the Seven Network commissioned the show to eventually replace Deal or No Deal and Million Dollar Minute in the 5:00 pm timeslot in a bid to revive ratings for its struggling 6:00 pm nightly news.

From June 2020, social distancing measures were applied on set due to the COVID-19 pandemic, with contestants spaced apart from each other. In August 2020, Seven announced that beginning with the spin-off, Beat The Chasers, production of The Chase Australia would move from Melbourne to Sydney in September 2020 due to COVID restrictions in Victoria at the time.

On 2 February 2021, Seven announced that the network did not renew host Andrew O'Keefe's contract in December 2020 and parted company with him after he was charged with domestic violence. On 22 February 2021, Seven announced that Larry Emdur would replace O'Keefe as host of the program, with future episodes to continue to be recorded in Sydney. The final new episode with O'Keefe as host aired on 20 July 2021. Episodes with Emdur as host began airing from 26 July 2021.

== Gameplay ==
=== Cash Builder and Head-to-Head rounds ===
Each contestant plays the first two rounds alone. In the first round, the "Cash Builder", they have one minute to answer as many questions as possible, earning $2,000 per correct answer. Next, the contestant faces the day's chaser in a head-to-head contest, attempting to move the money down to the bottom of a seven-step gameboard and into the team bank ("home"). They may start three steps down from the top (giving a three-step head start and requiring five correct answers to reach home) and play for the money earned in the Cash Builder, start one step farther down for a lesser award, or start one step farther up for a greater award. The latter two awards are stated by the chaser; since 2016, lesser awards can be zero or even negative.

Once the contestant chooses a starting position, the host begins to ask a series of questions with three answer options. The contestant and chaser separately lock in their guesses on keypads; once either person locks in, the other must do so within five seconds or be locked out for that turn. A correct answer moves the person who gave it one step down the board, but a miss or lock-out leaves them in place. If the contestant reaches home without being caught, they advance to the Final Chase and their money is added to the team's prize fund (or deducted, if they chose to play for a negative amount). If the chaser catches up, the contestant is eliminated and their money is forfeited.

If all four contestants lose their head-to-head chases, the team nominate one contestant to play for them for an amount of money offered by the chaser in the Final Chase, informally dubbed a "Lazarus" round.

=== Final Chase round ===
The remaining contestants now must work together to avoid being caught by the chaser. They blindly choose one of two question sets for themselves during the final commercial break, with the other set put aside for the chaser, and then have two minutes to answer as many questions as possible on the buzzer. Each correct answer moves the team ahead one step, and they are given a head start of one step per contestant participating in the round. Only the contestant who buzzes-in may answer or pass, and may not confer with their teammates; if a contestant responds without buzzing-in, the answer is automatically ruled wrong. The buzzer is not used if only one contestant is in the Final Chase. The host will only ask a new question once someone has buzzed in and either answered or passed. Unlike the original British version, the chaser remains onstage to witness the team's performance.

The chaser then has two minutes to answer questions from the unused set, moving one step ahead per correct response. If the chaser passes or misses, the clock stops and the team is given a chance to discuss it and respond. A correct answer pushes the chaser back one step, or moves the team ahead by one if the chaser is at the starting line. If the chaser catches the team before time runs out, the prize fund is lost and all four contestants leave with nothing. If the chaser fails to catch the team, the participating contestants split the prize fund equally.

=== Half-hour format ===
Half-hour episodes have occasionally aired due to Seven's commitments to air various sporting events (such as the Spring Racing Carnival and the 2020 Summer Olympics). These episodes feature two contestants instead of four. Each contestant plays the cash builder round, and the contestant that earns the higher amount of money takes the combined total of the two contestants to the gameboard for the head-to-head. If both contestants earn the same amount in the cash builder, the pair chooses which contestant will play head-to-head. If the contestant makes it back to the bank, the Final Chase is played as normal. If the contestant is caught in the head-to-head, the team nominate one contestant to play for them for an amount of money offered by the chaser in the Final Chase.

=== Double Trouble format ===
In 2024, the show introduced a new Double Trouble format variation, in which contestants face off against a pair of chasers in each episode, with the chasers alternating in the head-to-head rounds. During the Final Chase, the remaining contestants then choose a chaser to compete against from the pair.

=== Mega Money Spinner and Final Chase Firepower ===
Introduced in 2024, the Mega Money Spinner offers teams a chance to increase their prize pool if they score well enough in the Final Chase. A column of values is displayed on the gameboard used for the Head-to-Head Chase and put into motion to simulate a spinning slot machine reel, and one contestant presses a button to slow and stop it; the highlighted value is then added to the team's total. Earning 10-14 steps offers a maximum potential value of $50,000, while earning 15 or more gives a chance at up to $100,000.

Starting in 2025, the format was adjusted. In some episodes, a score of 13 steps or better gives the team a $100,000 spin, and failing to reach this target brings a "Final Chase Firepower" offer from the chaser to give up a portion of the money at stake in return for extra steps. Other episodes feature such an offer regardless of the team's score, but no opportunity to play the Mega Money Spinner.

=== Special episodes ===
Special shows featuring shortened gameplay have featured during Saturday Night Footy, Sunrise, Fifi, Dave & Fev and The Morning Show.

In February and March 2017, four specials aired featuring two teams from the eighth season of My Kitchen Rules playing for a home viewer.

== Celebrity specials ==
A weekly prime-time version of the show began airing on Seven from 21 August to 25 September 2019, entitled The Chase Celebrity Specials Australia (informally known as The Celebrity Chase). In it, teams of celebrities compete against the chaser to win prize money for their chosen charities. The game is played in the same way as the regular version. If a celebrity does not make it to the Final Chase, or if the team is caught during the Final Chase, a consolation prize is awarded to the charities for each celebrity. Unlike the regular version, the series is filmed in front of a studio audience.

In February 2022, a celebrity episode aired in the regular 5:00 pm timeslot to promote Dancing with the Stars. This was produced without a studio audience like the regular version.

== Chasers ==
Chaser	Nickname	Duration	Notes
Brydon Coverdale	"The Shark"	2015–present	Appeared on several Australian quiz programs, including Million Dollar Minute where he won $307,000 in 2014, becoming the first grand champion of Pass the Buck where he won $38,788 in 2002. He also won a total of $32,000 on Who Wants to Be a Millionaire?, appeared on The Weakest Link in 2001, Deal or No Deal in 2005 and was a quarter-finalist on Letters and Numbers in 2011. Ranked 289th in the World Quizzing Championships 2019.
Anne Hegerty	"The Governess"	2015–present^{a}^{,}^{b}	Appeared on several British quiz programs, including Mastermind (twice), Fifteen to One, Today's the Day and Brain of Britain; semi-finalist on Are You an Egghead?. Holds the rank of Grand Master in the UK quiz rankings. Ranked 40th in the World Quizzing Championships 2014. Best known in Australia for being one of the Chasers on the original UK version of the show.
Matt Parkinson	"Goliath"	2015–present	A championship winner on the television game show Sale of the Century in the 1990s and a frequent member of the "brains trust" on The Einstein Factor in the 2000s.
Issa Schultz	"The Supernerd"	2015–present	Twelve-time winner of the Australian Quizzing Championships in 2011, 2013, 2014, 2016, 2017, 2018, 2020, 2021, 2022, 2023, 2024 and 2025. and seven-time pairs champion (2012–17, 2020). Ranked 23rd in the world at the World Quizzing Championships in 2020. Appeared on The Rich List where he won $200,000 in 2009. He also appeared on Who Wants to Be a Millionaire? and The Einstein Factor. Appeared on the UK version in 2022 as a Guest Chaser on Beat The Chasers to substitute for Anne Hegerty.
Mark Labbett	"The Beast"	2016–2020, 2022, 2024-2025	Appeared on several British quiz programs, including Mastermind, University Challenge, Fifteen to One, The Syndicate and Who Wants to Be a Millionaire? (twice, winning £32,000 and £16,000); runner-up on The People's Quiz, runner-up on Brain of Britain, part of a winning team on Only Connect, represented Wales from 2005 to 2007 at the European quiz championships. Ranked 134th in the World Quizzing Championships 2014. Best known in Australia for being one of the Chasers on the original British version of the show as well as the being a Chaser in both American versions of the show.
Shaun Wallace	"The Destroyer"	2018 (Guest, Season 5)	Appeared on several British quiz programs, including Fifteen to One, Weakest Link, Beat the Nation, BrainTeaser, Greed and The Waiting Game; winner of Mastermind, finalist on the first series of Are You an Egghead?. Best known in Australia for being one of the Chasers on the original UK version of the show. Ranked 455th in the World Quizzing Championships 2014. Appeared on the Australian version as a Guest Chaser during season five.
Cheryl Toh	"The Tiger Mum"	2019–2025 (Guest, Seasons 7–9; Regular, Seasons 10–15)	Appeared on Temptation, The Einstein Factor and Million Dollar Minute.
Mara Lejins	"The Smiling Assassin"	2022–present (Guest, Seasons 11 and 12, Regular, Seasons 12–present)	A former contestant on The Chase Australia in 2017 and appeared on Beat The Chasers Australia in 2020, winning $60,000 against 3 Chasers in the heats, and walking away with $58,000 in the final.
Brandon Blackwell	"The Lightning Bolt"	2024 (Guest, Season 13)	Appeared on the American game shows Jeopardy!, Who Wants to Be a Millionaire, The Million Second Quiz, and the British quiz show University Challenge, and has served as a Chaser on the American version of The Chase since 2022.
David Poltorak	"The Professor"	2024–present (Guest, Season 13; Regular, Seasons 13-present)	Record-setting Sale of the Century contestant, and former question writer for Sale of the Century, Who Wants to Be a Millionaire? and Millionaire Hot Seat. Appeared on Beat The Chasers Australia in 2020.

Notes

- ^a Hegerty and Labbett were unable to get visas authorising them to travel from Britain to Australia, due to border closures implemented as a result of the COVID-19 pandemic in March 2020.
- ^b Hegerty returned to Australia to film during May 2021, with her first episode since June 2020 airing on 28 July 2021.
- ^c Labbett briefly featured in the advertisement for Season 10, but was not listed in the list of chasers in Seven's press release for Season 10 of The Chase Australia. Labbett joined ABC's version of The Chase USA in May 2021. Labbett's contract on the American version was not renewed by ABC in 2022 and rejoined the Australian version for Season 11 in February 2022.

== Ratings ==
Since debuting in September 2015, The Chase Australia has generally performed well in the ratings, often beating the Nine Network's Millionaire Hot Seat and Network Ten's 10 News First in the important 5:00 to 6:00 pm timeslot. The debut episode drew 520,000 for its first half-hour, and 720,000 for its second half-hour which went up against Millionaire Hot Seat. This was a key factor in Seven News regaining its crown as Australia's most-watched news service, but, as of September 2017, it continues to trail Nine News across the eastern seaboard, while it still leads comfortably in the Adelaide and Perth markets.

In response to continued strong ratings for The Chase Australia throughout 2016, the Nine Network announced rival game show Millionaire Hot Seat would extend to one hour from 2017, meaning both shows competed for the same duration. Despite the changes, The Chase Australia remained well ahead of Millionaire Hot Seat in the ratings, often winning by an average margin of 100,000, until the latter show's axing in November 2023. Since January 2024, The Chase Australia competes against Nine's Tipping Point Australia, produced by Banijay's Endemol Shine Australia.

== Beat the Chasers ==
In August 2020, Seven Network announced that an Australian version of Beat the Chasers would be produced. This version includes all the local Chasers of the series: Brydon Coverdale, Issa Schultz, Matt Parkinson and Cheryl Toh, as contestants try to beat them in order to win big cash prizes. The series premiered on 1 November 2020 and aired on Sundays at 7:00 p.m. for five consecutive weeks.

A single contestant plays the Cash Builder round, answering a series of multiple-choice questions worth $1,000 each. The round ends once they either miss a question or get five right; a miss on the first question immediately eliminates the contestant with no winnings. They must then decide how many chasers from two to four to face in a timed head-to-head round, with the chasers specifying a time limit for themselves (up to a maximum of 60 seconds) and offering larger cash prizes as an incentive to face more of them. The offer to face two chasers is always equal to the amount earned in the Cash Builder.

The contestant's clock is set to 60 seconds, while the chasers' clock is set to their agreed-on time. Only one clock runs at any given moment, starting with the contestant; the side in control must answer a question correctly to stop their clock and turn control over to the opposing side. The chasers must buzz-in to respond and may not confer on any questions. The contestant wins the money on offer if the chasers' clock runs out first, or nothing if their clock runs out.

Unlike the original British version, the Australian version of Beat the Chasers utilises a tournament format. The seven contestants with the highest cash winnings after the first four episodes are invited to return for a final showdown against the chasers in the fifth. The final follows the same rules, with some changes:

- Cash Builder questions are worth $5,000 each.
- A miss on the first question eliminates the contestant with only their winnings from the preliminary heats.
- For the head-to-head, the contestant must wager some portion of their heats winnings, which is added to their Cash Builder total.
- The contestant faces all four chasers and must choose one of three money/time offers.
- If the contestant loses, they forfeit the portion of their heats winnings that they risked.

On 12 April 2021, it was reported that Seven has commissioned a second season of Beat the Chasers with Larry Emdur as presenter. It was also announced that Seven were negotiating for Anne Hegerty to join the four Australian chasers for the second season.

== Transmissions ==
Series	Episodes	Originally released	
Series	Episodes	First released	Last released
1	65 (Note: Two 30-minute episodes aired on 3 November 2015 and 5 November 2015.)	14 September 2015	9 December 2015
2	65	10 December 2015	5 May 2016
3	65	9 May 2016	29 August 2016
4	65 (Note: Two 30-minute episodes aired on 1 November 2016 and 3 November 2016.)	30 August 2016	16 February 2017
5	260 (Note: Two 30-minute episodes aired on 7 November 2017 and 9 November 2017.)	16 February 2017	7 August 2018
6	64 (Note: Two 30-minute episodes aired on 6 November 2018 and 8 November 2018.)	8 August 2018	27 November 2018
7	100 (Note: A 30-minute episode aired on 14 June 2021 in selected markets.)	28 January 2019	14 June 2021
8	68	15 May 2019	5 May 2020
9	187 (Note: Episode 112 was due to air on 4 November 2020 but was postponed due to the extended coverage of the 2020 U.S. Election.)	4 February 2020	20 July 2021
10	70 (Note: Ten 30-minute episodes aired from 26 July 2021 to 6 August 2021)	26 July 2021	24 February 2022 (Note: Episodes 55 aired on 2 February 2022 and Episode 56 aired on 24 February 2022)
11	126	31 January 2022	6 February 2023 (Note: Episode 102 was due to air on 19 September 2022 but was postponed due to the coverage of the funeral of Queen Elizabeth II.)
12	126	14 November 2022	8 November 2023
13	126	13 November 2023	4 November 2025 (Note: Episode 53 was due to air on 22 October 2024 but was postponed due to the extended coverage of King Charles and Queen Camila tour to the Sydney Opera House and Episode 118 was due to air on 6 November 2024 but was postponed due to the extended coverage of the 2024 U.S. Election.)
14	54	2 October 2024	31 October 2025
15	87	17 March 2025	20 November 2025
16	87 (Note: Episode 46 was due to air on 24 August 2026 but was postponed and replaced to a repeat after the early end to Australia vs. Bangladash 2nd Test Cricket Match.)	19 January 2026	TBC 2027
17	126	10 August 2026	TBC 2027
Celebrity Specials	6	21 August 2019	25 September 2019
Beat The Chasers	5	1 November 2020	29 November 2020

=== International transmissions ===
In New Zealand, episodes of The Chase Australia originally aired weekly on TVNZ 1 and now airs on TVNZ Duke. On 14 March 2016, The Chase Australia began airing on UK TV channel Challenge, also available in Ireland, but this has since stopped.

== Merchandise ==
A localised version of the iOS and Android game from Barnstorm Games was released. The app features five chasers (excluding Cheryl 'Tiger Mum' Toh, who had not yet appeared on the programme at the time of release) and can be played by up to four people, as in the actual show. There is one significant difference between the show and the app; only three choices are presented for questions in the Cash Builder and Final Chase rounds, and no Final Chase is played if all the players are caught in their individual chases.

On 13 July 2023, an updated app called The Chase: World Tour was released by Barnstorm Games, featuring the Australian chasers (now including Toh and Lejins), alongside the British and American chasers.

On 8 February 2016, a board game version was released by Crown and Andrews. It features three of the chasers: Issa, Brydon, and Matt. Another edition of the board game was released by Imagination Games in 2019.
