= Issa Schultz =

British-Australian quizzer and TV personality

- Born: 1 March 1984 (age 42); Truro, Cornwall, England
- Other name: "The Supernerd"
- Citizenship: United Kingdom, Australia
- Occupation: Television quiz personality
- Known for: The Chase Australia; Hell's Kitchen Australia

Issa Schultz (born 1 March 1984) is a British-Australian television quiz personality best known for being one of the "chasers" on The Chase Australia, where he is nicknamed "The Supernerd".

In addition to his current role on The Chase Australia, Schultz is also a 13-time winner of the Australian Quizzing Championships (2011, 2013–2014, 2016–2018, 2020–2026) and seven-time Pairs champion (2012–17, 2020). He also appeared on The Rich List, where he won $200,000 in 2009, as well as Who Wants to Be a Millionaire? and The Einstein Factor.

His name Issa is an Arabic version of the name "Jesus", which he was named after a best friend of his parents when they worked in Qatar in the 1970s. Schultz and his family moved to Australia from Britain in 1995. They settled in Tewantin, Queensland and Schultz attended Tewantin State School and Noosa District State High School. He was one of the four school captains in 2001.

In 2017, Schultz appeared as a celebrity contestant on Hell's Kitchen Australia.

Schultz placed 15th in the 2025 World Quizzing Championships, and has been the top-ranked Australian competitor twelve times since 2011.

In March 2022, he stood in for Anne Hegerty in ITV's Beat the Chasers after Hegerty tested positive for COVID-19.

Schultz also competed in the twentieth series of Dancing with the Stars in early 2023. He was paired with professional Tasmanian dancer Lily Cornish.

In November 2024, Schultz represented Australia at the III Quiz Olympiad in Spain.

In November 2025, Schultz appeared as a chaser on The Chase New Zealand in a four-episode special series. In 2026 he hosted the Australian version of Antiques Roadshow.
