= The Oz Game =

Australian game quiz show

- Presented by: John Derum
- Country of origin: Australia
- Original language: English

Production
- Running time: 30 minutes

Original release
- Network: ABC TV
- Release: 26 July 1988 – 16 June 1989

The Oz Game is an Australian television quiz show broadcast on the Australian Broadcasting Corporation. It was originally intended to premiere on 25 July 1988 at 6:30 pm, but after a request for a court injunction to stop the show was refused, it started airing on 26 July 1988 at 6:30 pm. Hosted by John Derum it featured teams of two, a related adult and child, trying to answer Australia related questions. In January 1989, it was rescheduled to begin at 6 pm. Derum's offsider for the first year (two seasons) was Allan Glover who was replaced with Anthony Ackroyd in 1989. David Poltorak was brought in as head writer and adjudicator for the third season.
