= Brydon Coverdale =

Australian quiz personality

- Born: 19 September 1981 (age 45); Camperdown, Victoria, Australia
- Other name: "The Shark"
- Occupations: Quiz show personality Cricket journalist
- Known for: The Chase Australia (2015–present)

Brydon Coverdale (born 19 September 1981) is an Australian quizzer and television personality. He is best known for being one of the eight "chasers" on The Chase Australia, where he is nicknamed "The Shark".

Coverdale grew up in Camperdown in Victoria and attended Mercy Regional College. In later life he moved to the city to study journalism. He is a fan of sport, particularly cricket. Prior to The Chase Australia, Coverdale appeared on several other Australian quiz programs, including Million Dollar Minute where he won $307,000 in 2014. He became the first grand champion of Pass the Buck where he won $38,788 in 2002. He also won a total of $32,000 on Who Wants to Be a Millionaire?, appeared on The Weakest Link in 2001, Deal or No Deal in 2005 and was a quarter-finalist on Letters and Numbers in 2011. He has also appeared on Sale of the Century and Wheel of Fortune.

Coverdale also worked as a reporter and assistant editor at Cricinfo, a news website exclusively for cricket, for 11 years.

On 5 October 2013, Coverdale married Zoe in Eltham, Melbourne, Australia. They have a daughter named Heidi and a son, Fletcher.

Coverdale also runs a blog named DadReads, discussing children's books he has read to his children.
