= Australian Quiz Champion =

In the late 1940s and 1950s the Australian National Quiz Championships were run and broadcast live by ABC Radio. The quiz was arranged to promote the Federal Government's security loans for post-war reconstruction. Future Prime Minister Gough Whitlam was joint winner in 1948 and runner-up in 1949.

From 2007 the highest-scoring Australian at the World Quizzing Championship has been recognised as the national champion.

In 2024 Quizzing Australia launched a stand-alone domestic event, the Australian Quiz Championships.

== Champions ==
=== 20th Century ===
| Year | Winner(s) | Runner-up |
|---|---|---|
| 1948 | S. Robertson (Vic), G. Morris (Vic), Gough Whitlam (NSW), G. Bohman (NSW) | |
| 1949 | I.F. Jones | Gough Whitlam |
| 1950 | W.G. McDonald | |

=== 21st Century ===
The highest-placed Australian at the annual World Quiz Championships.

| Year | National Champion |
|---|---|
| 2007 | David Regal |
| 2008 | Trevor Evans |
| 2009 | David Vickers |
| 2010 | David Regal |
| 2011 | Issa Schultz |
| 2012 | Ross Evans |
| 2013 | Issa Schultz |
| 2014 | Issa Schultz |
| 2015 | Ross Evans |
| 2016 | Issa Schultz |
| 2017 | Issa Schultz |
| 2018 | Issa Schultz |
| 2019 | Ross Evans |
| 2020 | Issa Schultz |
| 2021 | Issa Schultz |
| 2022 | Issa Schultz |
| 2023 | Issa Schultz |
| 2024 | Issa Schultz |
| 2025 | Issa Schultz |
| 2026 | Issa Schultz |

=== Multiple individual titles ===
- 13 - Issa Schultz
- 3 - Ross Evans

=== Australian Quiz Championships ===
| Year | (gold) Winner | (silver) Runner-up | (bronze) Third place |
|---|---|---|---|
| 2024 | Issa Schultz | Ross Evans | Aaran Mohann |
| 2025 | Issa Schultz | David Howse | Aaran Mohann |
| 2026 | Issa Schultz | Aaran Mohann | Rohan Williams |

=== Australian Pairs Champions ===
| Year | Winners |
|---|---|
| 2012 | Issa Schultz and Honza Mikula |
| 2013 | Issa Schultz and David Regal |
| 2014 | Issa Schultz and Michael Logue |
| 2015 | Issa Schultz and Michael Logue |
| 2016 | Issa Schultz and Michael Logue |
| 2017 | Issa Schultz and Michael Logue |
| 2018 | Michael Sanders and Cory Nagel |
| 2019 | Brydon Coverdale and Chris Coverdale |
| 2020 | Issa Schultz and Michael Logue |
| 2021 | Not contested due to COVID-19 |
| 2022 | Gordon McGregor and Aaran Mohann |
| 2023 | Paul Bakker and Jason Taylor |
| 2024 | Ross Evans and Jamie Anderson |
| 2025 | Rohan Williams and Stirling Coates |

=== Australian Teams Champions ===
Contested as a four-person event from 2015-2020 inclusive, and as a three-person event in all subsequent years.

| Year | Winners |
|---|---|
| 2015 | Geoffrey Gettins, Lindon Johnsson, Graeme Mackie and Gordon McGregor |
| 2016 | Leon Derry, Ross Evans, Jim Huxley and Shane Francis |
| 2017 | Leon Derry, Ross Evans, Jim Huxley and Shane Francis |
| 2018 | Leon Derry, Ross Evans, Jim Huxley and Shane Francis |
| 2019 | Phil Denman, Derk de Graaf, Honza Mikula and Andrea Zijlstra |
| 2020 | Leon Derry, Ross Evans, Jim Huxley and Shane Francis |
| 2021 | Not contested due to COVID-19 |
| 2022 | Gordon McGregor, David Morgan and Aaran Mohann |
| 2023 | David Howse, Beau Howse and Brendan Pigott |
| 2024 | Gordon McGregor, David Morgan and Aaran Mohann |
| 2025 | Nick Clement, David Howse and Brendan Pigott |
