= Temptation (Australian game show) =

- The New Sale of the Century
- Genre: Game show
- Presented by: Ed Phillips; Livinia Nixon
- Country of origin: Australia
- Original language: English
- No. of seasons: 4
- No. of episodes: 535

Production
- Executive producers: Michael Whyte; Karen Greene
- Producer: Heather Brooks
- Production locations: Melbourne, Victoria
- Camera setup: Multiple-camera setup
- Running time: 23 minutes
- Production companies: Grundy Productions; FremantleMedia Australia

Original release
- Network: Nine Network
- Release: 30 May 2005 – 23 January 2009

Related
- Sale of the Century (1980–2001)

Temptation is an Australian game show which premiered on the Nine Network on 30 May 2005 and aired at 7.00pm (5.30pm for most regionals). Hosted by Ed Phillips and Livinia Nixon, the show was a remake of Sale of the Century, which aired on Nine in the same timeslot for more than twenty years between 1980 and 2001. Temptation had the same general format of its predecessor, but with several new features and a de-emphasis on the "shopping" aspects of the endgame. The show ran until 30 November 2007, when it was placed on hiatus by the network following strong competition from game show Deal or No Deal on the rival Seven Network; during the hiatus, Nine filled the timeslot with episodes of the American sitcom Two and a Half Men. When Ed Phillips made an appearance on The NRL Footy Show he announced "maybe summer" would be the return of the show. This statement was accurate, as Temptation returned for a shortened fourth series from 1 December 2008 with unaired episodes which were recorded during 2008. During that time, Ed Phillips's contract expired in November, and Temptation never returned to the schedule. After 23 January 2009, when the show's final episode aired, all Temptation websites were removed, and Two and a Half Men returned to Channel Nine's 7:00pm schedule.

== Format ==
=== Main game ===
As in Sale, the game was split into four rounds. Contestants begin with a score of A$20. When Ed Phillips asks a question, the first contestant to buzz in had the chance to answer the question; if correct, he or she gained $5; if wrong, he or she lost $5. Phillips revealed the answer immediately if the contestant answered incorrectly; no other contestants were given the opportunity to answer. Contestants needed not wait until Phillips had finished asking the question before buzzing in.

Also throughout the game were several "Who Am I?" questions. Phillips read out a series of clues to the identity of a famous person, revealing facts which became progressively more helpful; the final and most helpful clue was the person's first name and last initial. As before, the first contestant to buzz in had the chance to answer the question; if correct, he or she made a "famous faces" selection (see below); if wrong, he or she lost no money, but Phillips continued reading clues and the other contestants were given the chance to answer.

Round One: After the first three questions, there was a 20-second "Sprint" speed round. Immediately after this, the first Gift Shop of the night was offered to the leading player or players. The first Gift Shop item cost $6, and usually had a retail cost between $1,500 and $2,500; this $6 price could be reduced at the discretion of producers, or alternatively an additional cash incentive could be included into the prize, which was usually either $200 or $400. In any Gift Shop, if two or more players were tied in the lead, Ed would conduct a Dutch auction.

There were a few more questions, and then the first "Who am I?" question, known as the Fame Game.

Round Two: After the first few questions, the second Gift Shop was offered. This item was offered for $10, and usually had a retail value of between $3,000 and $7,000; this could again be accompanied by a cash incentive, or the $10 price could be lowered. More questions were asked, and then the second "Who am I?". After the "Who am I?", three more questions were asked before another 20-second sprint round. This ended round two.

After round two, co-host Nixon gave the home viewer a question called "On This Day" where she told the home viewer facts that happened on that day. In the first two seasons (2005 and 2006) Nixon asked the home audience a question relating to the event on that day before the break and gave the answer after the break and then round three began. In 2007, only the question was given by Livinia, allowing the viewers at home to call in the answer by phone or SMS the answer overnight to win a $500 cash prize. Before the next night's "On This Day" question was asked, Ed gave the correct answer to the previous night. Viewers at home could then visit the program's website to see if they have won.

Round Three: After the first three questions, the leading player or players were offered a chance at opening the Temptation Vault, at the price of $15—this price was never reduced from $15 unless there was more than one player eligible, in which case a Dutch auction was held. Whoever opened the vault stopped the shuffling numbers for a cash prize of random value between $1 and $10,000; the probability distribution of Vault prizes was unknown, but values below $1,000 in particular were rare. After the Vault, there were three more standard questions followed by the final "Who am I?".

Final Round: The final round consisted of a single 60-second fast money speed round.

Famous Faces: Correct "Who am I?" answers chose one of nine boxes, identified by celebrities' faces. As before, most of the faces concealed small prizes, but there were cash values (also known as Money Cards) which were added directly to the player's score:

- $10—present in all three rounds until chosen
- $15—present in the second and third rounds
- $25—added only in the third round
- Wild Card—added only in the third round; gave the contestant either a $2,000 cash prize, or allowed them to select from the remaining faces in the hope of finding a Money Card.

The new Temptation series had also added three special selections. All of these selections were present from the beginning of the game, however the Lock Out and Turbo were removed from the board in the third round:

- Burglar—the player could steal $5 from one opponent, which was then added to their own score.
- Lock Out—the player elected one opponent to be shut out; they would then be unable to answer any of the next three questions.
- Turbo—the next three questions are automatically doubled to $10, but only for the contestant who selected it. Furthermore, the penalty for an incorrect answer also doubles to $10.

In each case, the next three questions were never part of a fast money round. This was also the reason why the Lock Out and Turbo items were removed from the board for the final "Who am I?".

On occasions throughout the year, Temptation would break from its normal running style for a week and run a celebrity edition. In most cases these celebrities were playing for home viewers, where the normal prizes and money cards were present. Sometimes the celebrities would be playing for charities, where instead of small prizes cash donations to their charity were given (usually between $500 and $5,000). The money cards still remained.

=== Bonus game ===
A first-time winner was offered a major prize, worth about $10,000, and given the choice to take it and leave the show, or to return to play again. Gradually larger prizes were offered each night, leading up to a $50,000–$95,000 car on night five, all five prizes (roughly $130,000) on night six, a cash jackpot in night seven, and all the prizes and double the cash jackpot on night eight.

The cash jackpot amount was determined as follows. Each champion has $50,000 placed in their cash jackpot if they chose to return after their first night. They were then given the chance to play "Top Ten". If they correctly answered ten of the questions asked of them in a 60-second segment at the end of each night, $50,000 more was added to the cash jackpot. The cash jackpot could only be claimed after night seven or eight. Contestants chose one of five sets of questions to be asked. Passes and incorrect answers didn't reset the value at zero (cf 2005 below).

Theoretically, the highest cash jackpot a contestant could win was $800,000, i.e. $2(50,000 \times 7 + 50,000)$.

=== Original 2005 format ===
When Temptation premiered on 30 May 2005, there were some slight format differences from later series:

==== Main game ====
- The Temptation Vault was offered in Round 1 for $10 (instead of the Gift Shop) with the value going up to a maximum $5,000.
- The Burglar on the Fame Game only took away $5 from an opponent without it going onto the "burglar's" score.
- The Turbo on the Fame Game applied to all three contestants, as opposed to the one contestant who selected it. This change was not made until 17 April 2006.
- The Gift Shop was offered in Round 3 for $15 (instead of the Temptation Vault).
- The value of the Wild Card was half, at $1,000.

==== Bonus Round: Ten in a Row ====
In the 2005 end game Ten in a Row, contestants had to answer ten questions consecutively within the space of one minute. The amount of cash won increased through a non-linear scale:

- $100,000
- $60,000
- $30,000
- $20,000
- $15,000
- $10,000
- $6,000
- $4,000
- $2,000
- $1,000

Any incorrect, passed answer or questions that were not answered in three seconds reset the value to $0, and a contestant who didn't reach $100,000 won whatever value they had when time expired.

In 2005, six-night champions could keep all five prizes or return for one more night. If a contestant won on night seven, then they would win all the prizes, the money in their cash account (which was not doubled), and $500,000 in gold bullion. Theoretically, the highest cash jackpot a contestant could win was $600,000 ($1,100,000 including the gold bullion, i.e. $100,000 \times 6 + 500,000$).

Carry-over champions would also be able to leave the show at any time with money won during Ten in a Row won up to that point in addition to the prize or prizes to which he or she had been entitled.

The format for the bonus round was modified in 2006. First-night champions would automatically be given a $50,000 cash jackpot, which could not be won until at least their seventh night. The Ten in a Row segment was changed so that ten correct answers would add another $50,000 to the jackpot. There was no need to correctly answer the questions consecutively, but at least ten answers had to be answered correctly before time ran out.

== Grand champions ==
Record-breaking champions of Temptation:

- Brigid O'Connor (Episode 18, 22 June 2005, $663,738)
- Stephen Hall (Episode 63, 24 August 2005, $672,357)
- Rob O'Neill (Episode 75, 9 September 2005, $701,241)
- Yolanda Stopar (8 March 2006, $932,577) (First grand champion under the current format; biggest winner in combined history of Sale of the Century and Temptation; also set a record score of $135 on two separate occasions, the first of which was also a record $100 margin of victory over her opponents)
- Tracey Korsten (2 November 2006, $857,655)
- Blair Martin (11 June 2007, $603,002)
- Sunil Badami (22 August 2007, $638,068)

== Specials ==
Since its inception, Temptation has produced a number of special serials.

=== Quizmaster ===
Quizmaster aired from 27 March to 3 April 2006, featuring nine of the most successful contestants from Temptation, Who Wants to Be a Millionaire? and Temptation's predecessor, Sale of the Century, competing to win more money for themselves (the format is similar to the Jeopardy! Tournament of Champions). 2005 grand champion Rob O'Neill defeated 2006 grand champion Yolanda Stopar in the head-to-head final by the score of $110–$80, winning $815,840 in cash and prizes.

=== Other specials ===
Special series were often run featuring celebrities, sports personalities, and former champions. The format varied from special to special, depending upon the number of contestants available, and some specials had seen celebrities compete in pairs. Prizes for these specials were either donated to a charity of the celebrity's choice, or awarded to randomly chosen home viewers.

== Foreign versions ==
- A local version of Temptation airs in South Africa on the M-Net channel, hosted by James Lennox and Bridget Masinga. The first new game show to air on the channel since Who Wants to Be a Millionaire?, it premiered on 25 September 2006, airing weeknights for six weeks. Contestants could become grand champions and win all of the prizes by winning six times. At the end of the first series, the three top winners with the highest total scores returned for a chance at a house in Johannesburg worth over R 2,000,000. The winner of the South African series on 3 November was Theunis Strydom, the only six-night champion, who finished with over R2,600,000 in cash and prizes.
- M-Net airs a version of Temptation in Nigeria, which premiered on 6 November 2006 and airs weekly on Monday evenings. It is hosted by Ikponmwosa "Ik" Osakioduwa and Kemi Adetiba. The first series consisted of 26 episodes. Contestants can become grand champions and win all of the prizes by winning six times. At the end of the first series, the three top winners returned for a chance at prizes worth over US$100,000. The winner of the Nigerian series was Erhabor Emokpae, who finished with over US$155,000 in cash and prizes.
- A syndicated U.S. version of Temptation hosted by Rossi Morreale, premiered in fall 2007 in syndication and on the struggling "netlet" MyNetworkTV and ran for one season. This version never rose above 0.5 in the Nielsen rating system, making it the least-watched game show on broadcast television that year.

== Home versions ==
A Temptation board game was released by Crown and Andrews in 2006. The following contents are in the board game: playing board, electronic umpire (an electronic item that determines which player buzzed first), six buttons, a 'Question and Answer' book, six score markers, 16 Show Prize cards, 24 Leader Prize cards, 26 Winner Prize cards, card tray and the rules. A picture of the game can be found here:

Additionally, a DVD game was released by Imagination in 2007, featuring series host Ed Phillips, before the show was scrapped.

== Novelty Item ==
A Big Red Buzzer (or Temptation Buzzer) was released which includes a ring-in sound effect and a three-second timer with a flashing light.
