= Millionaire Hot Seat =

Australian television quiz show

- Also known as: Hot Seat
- Genre: Game show
- Screenplay by: Bernard Derriman
- Directed by: Ron Campbell
- Presented by: Eddie McGuire; Rebecca Gibney
- Theme music composer: Ramon Covalo
- Composers: Ramon Covalo; Keith Strachan; Matthew Strachan; Nick Magnus
- Country of origin: Australia
- Original language: English
- No. of seasons: 16
- No. of episodes: 2,651

Production
- Production locations: GTV-9 Melbourne (2009–10); Docklands Studios Melbourne (2011–2023, 2026); Nunawading studios, Melbourne (2027-)
- Running time: 30 minutes (2009–2016, 2026–present); 60 minutes (2017–2023)
- Production companies: 2waytraffic (2009–2019); Sony Pictures (2019–2023) (Note: As Sony Pictures Television); Curio Entertainment (2026)

Original release
- Network: Nine Network
- Release: 20 April 2009 – 29 November 2023
- Network: 10
- Release: 2 February 2026 – present

Millionaire Hot Seat, also known as Hot Seat, is an Australian television quiz show. The show is a spin-off of Who Wants to Be a Millionaire? and began airing on the Nine Network on 20 April 2009. As with the original Australian version of the show, it was hosted by Eddie McGuire and followed a similar format.

In 2025, it was announced that actress Rebecca Gibney would be hosting a revival of the program on Network 10, which premiered on 2 February 2026, which was simulcast on all four of Network 10 channels: 10, 10 Drama, 10 Comedy and Nickelodeon, the latter of which via the Nick@Nite block.

== History ==
Rumours about a new shortened version of Millionaire first began circulating in February 2009 and were confirmed when the Nine Network produced a pilot version of the format titled Millionaire: Russian Roulette in March 2009. The official title was announced as Millionaire Hot Seat, but this was later shortened to simply Hot Seat. The new format was originally promoted as a short-run series, with advertisements featuring McGuire exclaiming "20 nights! 20 million dollars!" Nine announced on 7 April 2009 that Hot Seat would begin airing on 20 April 2009 in the 5:00 pm–6:00 pm weeknight timeslot and would compete against the high-rating game show, Deal or No Deal, on the Seven Network. As expected, the show's format was shortened to 30 minutes and given an overhaul of the rules and gameplay, in a system based on the Italian version of the show.

Previously, a half-hour edition of the original version aired for a two-week period in June 2004, aimed at attempting to arrest declining ratings leading into its most-watched news service.

The Nine Network commissioned a second series of the show, to begin airing the week after the original 20-episode order had finished airing on 15 May 2009. The second series began airing on 18 May 2009.

A special prime time edition of Hot Seat aired at 8:00 pm on Monday, 8 June 2009, featuring a contestant, Barry Soraghan, playing for the format's first million-dollar question. Ultimately, Soraghan answered the question incorrectly, and won only $1,000. At the completion of the taped episode, Soraghan was visited live on air at his Blackburn home by McGuire, who then awarded him a two-week holiday for him and his family, as well as $5,000 in spending money. The episode achieved a ratings figure of 1,224,000 viewers nationally, and was the eleventh-highest rating program for the night, which was a vast improvement from the 812,000 viewers that Hot Seat managed in its regular timeslot on the same night.

Hot Seat was originally filmed in the Studio 9 at the GTV9 Richmond premises; however, from February 2011 until its final episode, it was filmed at GTV9's new home at Docklands Studios Melbourne. The show's 500th episode went to air on 3 August 2011; that day's contestant winning $100,000.

On 15 August 2011 the four remaining couples from the 2011 season of The Block appeared on the show, attempting to win $1,000,000 for charity. But the final couple in the hot seat faltered on the seventh question. The last couple won only $1,000 for their charity.

On 3 October 2011, a The Farmer Wants a Wife special went to air ahead of the final that was to air later that night. Farmer Frank, the last contestant in the Hot Seat, had a chance to win $100,000 for his charity but lost, winning only $1,000 for the Royal Flying Doctors Services.

On 27 July 2012, Hot Seat went on hiatus for the London 2012 Olympic Games until 13 August 2012.

A local version began airing exclusively for Western Australian viewers in 2014.

On 2 June 2014, Hot Seat celebrated its 1,000th episode. In this episode, that day's contestant Janine won $50,000. In addition, McGuire called back all the contestants telling them they each won $1,000 for appearing on its 1,000th episode.

On 16 March 2015 the top prize of $20,000 jackpotted to $541,000 and was won by Gerard Lane from Victoria, Australia.

On 13 April 2015, Hot Seat had its first revamp since it launched in 2009. The intro was slightly changed, a new set with higher resolution LED screens was introduced and new graphics using the Eurostile font. A new lifeline was also added for the final question, the Switch lifeline. The contestant on the final question could use it to change the final question to another one of the same value. This lifeline was dropped after 8 May 2015 episode, but was reinstated for episodes airing between 21 and 25 September of the same year.

The program marked 1,500 episodes on 12 October 2016.

In December 2016, Nine Network announced that Millionaire Hot Seat would extend to one hour from 2017. Having rated strongly since its launch in 2009, which led to Nine News regaining its ratings dominance nationally, the show started to lose ground to rival show The Chase Australia in the last fifteen months. Despite this revamp, Millionaire Hot Seat continues to languish behind The Chase Australia in the ratings, often by an average margin of 100,000 viewers; however, Nine News, which immediately follows Millionaire Hot Seat, has continued to retain its ratings dominance on the east coast.

In February 2020, in Adelaide only, the show was moved forward to 4:00 pm in order to combat poor ratings for its flagship 6:00 pm bulletin. In September 2020, the program temporarily moved production to Queensland, for 7 weeks, following a COVID-19 pandemic outbreak, which resulted in the host Eddie McGuire having to quarantine. In November the same year, the program moved production back to Docklands Studios Melbourne.

From 25 January 2021, the show began airing at 3:00 pm in Perth, swapping slots with Tipping Point.

The game show marked 2,500 episodes on 17 April 2023, on the week the show celebrated its 14-year anniversary. On 4 August 2023, the Nine Network announced the final episodes would be broadcast at the end of January 2024. On 10 August 2023, the network announced the show will be replaced by a local version of Tipping Point in the 5:00 pm time slot, and hosted by Todd Woodbridge. The final newly produced episode aired on 29 November 2023.

On 12 January 2024, Millionaire Hot Seat aired the last repeat episode before Tipping Point Australia took over the time slot on 29 January 2024.

On 15 July 2025, it was confirmed by ITV and Sony Pictures Television that a British version of Hot Seat had been commissioned for 2026. That version is hosted by Jeremy Clarkson and eighteen episodes were filmed.

In August 2025, a casting call opened for new contestants with filming to start in September; it was speculated the series would move from the Nine Network to Network 10 and would be produced by Curio Entertainment. Filming took place in Melbourne between 24 September 2025 to 21 January 2026. The series is hosted by actress Rebecca Gibney. The series premiered on 2 February 2026, which was simulcast on all four of Network 10 channels: 10, 10 Drama, 10 Comedy and Nickelodeon, the latter of which via the Nick@Nite block, with reduced airtime from 60 to 30 minute episodes.

== Format ==
Question	Value
15	$1,000,000
14	$250,000
13	$100,000
12	$50,000
11	$20,000
10	$10,000
9	$6,000
8	$4,000
7	$2,500
6	$1,500
5	$1,000
4	$500
3	$300
2	$200
1	$100

Designed to be a faster-paced format compared to the traditional Millionaire, Hot Seat is basically Who Wants to Be a Millionaire? mixed with elements of roulette and musical chairs, and sees six contestants all playing in a single game. The player in Seat 1 starts as the active player (the one in the "hot seat") and play rotates around in seat order, with players aiming to be in the "hot seat" for the final question of the game. The game starts with a top prize of $1 million, but as players provide incorrect answers, the top prize moves one step down the money tree to a minimum of $10,000. There is a single safe level set at $1,000 after five correct answers, meaning the player in the hot seat for the final question leaves with either $1,000 or the highest remaining prize amount.

Each question is given a time limit: 15 seconds for questions 1–5, 30 seconds for questions 6–10, and 45 seconds for questions 11‍–‍15. The timer starts after the host reads the question and the four possible answers. Answers are confirmed by saying "lock it in" or "final answer". Each player has access to only one lifeline: the Pass. When used, the active player moves to the back of the line and the question passes to the next player in line. This player must answer the current question and cannot pass it further. If the timer expires and the player still has their Pass, it is automatically used. If the player answers incorrectly, or the timer expires and they have already used their Pass, the player is eliminated, and the next player becomes the active player, with the top prize moving down the money tree. Unlike the traditional format, there is no option for players to walk away with the current money earned, meaning they must answer every question given.

The game continues until all players have been eliminated, or the final question has been answered. If the active player answers the final question correctly, they win the value of that question. If the final question is incorrectly answered, or the final player is eliminated, the active player wins $1,000, provided they have reached the safe level. Any players who do not get an opportunity to be the active player are invited back to play another game at a later date.

=== Variations ===
During the second half of 2011, audio and visual questions were introduced to the format. Either an audio or a visual question would be asked once per episode, usually towards the beginning of the game.

During 2015, the "Switch" lifeline was added for contestants on the final question. This allowed the contestant to switch to a different question if they were unhappy with it. This feature was soon dropped on 8 May 2015, but was brought back for a week of episodes from 21 to 25 September of the same year.

Later in 2015, the "Ask a Friend" lifeline was added in for contestants. Similar to the traditional Phone-a-Friend, the contestant is able to ask their designated friend or family member in the audience to help them answer the question. Before the player can use the lifeline, they must answer three consecutive questions after the $1000 'safe level'. The feature was added for a week of episodes from 14 to 18 September 2015.

In some episodes of the 2026 revival, contestants who answer the $1,000 question correctly receive a $250 voucher from Harvey Norman. This was added in the 23 February 2026 episode.

=== 2017–2023 ===
Starting on 23 January 2017, in response of the continued strong ratings of Seven's The Chase Australia since 2016, Nine's Millionaire Hot Seat changed its format to mix both the traditional format with the Hot Seat format. In this format, the show was lengthened to a full-hour show as opposed to half an hour show and is divided into two parts: Fastest Finger First and Hot Seat.

In this version of Fastest Finger First, the six contestants are given fifteen questions, aiming to answer as many correctly in the fastest time. The round is played similar to the original format of FFF, where there is a question presented with four possible answers and the contestant must lock in the singular answer to the question. (This is different from the second version of Fastest Finger First where the contestants had to put the four possible choices into a designated order.) Players in this version are only give 10 seconds to lock in an answer compared to 20 seconds in the traditional format. Additionally, there is normally one audio and one visual question within the question set. The winner of this segment is the player with the most correct answers, with ties being broken by the lowest combined time taken to lock in. This player is awarded a cheque for $1,000, which they may keep or cash in during the main game in exchange for a lifeline. The game then moves into the Hot Seat round, beginning with the player in Seat 1 (regardless of performance in Fastest Finger First).

Play in the Hot Seat round proceeds as normal until the winner of Fastest Finger First becomes the active player. In addition to the Pass lifeline, the player may exchange their $1,000 cheque for one of the following lifelines:

- 50/50 – the computer randomly selects two incorrect answers and removes them from play, leaving the correct answer and one incorrect answer.
- Switch – the current question is removed from play and is replaced with a new question of similar difficulty.
- Ask a Friend – similar to the traditional Phone a Friend lifeline. The player is able to converse with their in-audience companion (if one is present) and work together to answer the question. When used, the question and the four possible answers are read out by the player, who is not allowed to look at their companion.

Using a lifeline restarts the clock for the question.

In episodes filmed with no studio audience due to the COVID-19 pandemic in Australia, the Ask a Friend lifeline was replaced with Ask the Host. During questions with the player holding the lifeline, the host cannot see the correct answer until the computer reveals it. When used, the player is free to converse with McGuire, who will give guidance on the question. Once McGuire has given his thoughts, the timer restarts.

== Top prize winners ==
=== Original version ===
==== Edwin Daly (29 August 2016) ====
On 29 August 2016, 67-year-old Edwin Daly became the first Australian contestant (and the fourth worldwide) on the original version of Hot Seat (and the third in Australia) to win the top prize of AU$1,000,000.

Daly's A$1,000,000 question

AU$1,000,000 (15 of 15) – 45 seconds

Commonly known by his nickname, what was the full name of 'Banjo' Paterson?

1. Albert Burke
2. Andrew Barton(correct answer)
3. Adam Beaufort
4. Adrian Banks

==== Antony McManus (25 November 2021) ====
On 25 November 2021, Antony McManus became the second and the last Australian contestant on the original version of Hot Seat (and the fourth in Australia) to win the top prize of AU$1,000,000, using the Switch lifeline he won in Fastest Finger First by handing over his AU$1,000 cheque to swap the question.

Original question (Answer was selected after the Switch lifeline was used):

McManus' original A$1,000,000 question

AU$1,000,000 (15 of 15) – 45 seconds

How many Australian prime ministers have been members for electorates in Queensland?

1. 1
2. 2
3. 3(chosen; incorrect answer)
4. 4(correct answer)

Switched question:

McManus' switched A$1,000,000 question

AU$1,000,000 (15 of 15) - 45 seconds

Which of these classic literary works was published first?

1. The Count of Monte Cristo(correct answer)
2. A Tale of Two Cities
3. War and Peace
4. Les Misérables

== Controversy ==
In one episode, a contestant gave an answer to the final question, but McGuire told the contestant that she had not answered it in time and checked with the producers to see whether this was a "pass" or she was to be awarded $1,000. While the decision was being made, the contestant insisted that she had two seconds left on the clock. In the end, the time ran out, therefore, the contestant won $1,000.
