= Matt Parkinson (comedian) =

Australian comedian

- Born: Matthew Parkinson; Perth, Western Australia, Australia
- Other name: "Goliath"
- Occupations: Comedian; actor; radio presenter; quiz show personality
- Years active: 2015–present
- Known for: The Chase Australia (2015-present)
- Height: 1.98 m (6 ft 6 in)

Matthew Parkinson is an Australian comedian, actor, radio presenter and quiz show personality.

== Life and career ==
Parkinson was born in Perth, Western Australia. He began acting at school and studied theatre arts at the Western Australian Institute of Technology. His professional career began in Perth at the Hole in the Wall Theatre where he appeared in Hamlet, The Cherry Orchard, A Midsummer Night's Dream and the title role in Ben Johnson's The Alchemist.

Parkinson was formerly a member of the comedy duo the Empty Pockets, along with Matthew Quartermaine, who featured regularly on the television comedy shows The Big Gig and Full Frontal.

Parkinson was also a champion winner of television game show Sale of the Century in the 1990s.

Parkinson was one of the hosts of the Triple M breakfast program The Cage in Melbourne. After the axing of The Cage in the Sydney market at the end of 2006, he moved to Melbourne to continue to co-host the show. He was a regular member of the "Brains Trust" on the ABC quiz show The Einstein Factor, hosted by fellow Cage member Peter Berner. He was also a judge on Comedy Slapdown hosted by H.G. Nelson which appeared on The Comedy Channel in 2008. In 2010, he was a writer on the comedy murder-mystery game show Sleuth 101 on the ABC.

In 2011, Parkinson had a cardiac arrest while playing indoor cricket in Melbourne.

In 2015, he was announced as one of the "chasers" on the Australian version of the UK quiz show The Chase on the Seven Network where he is nicknamed "Goliath". He also appears in the celebrity edition of the show.

Parkinson is married to television producer Maryanne Carroll.
