= Deal or No Deal (Australian game show) =

Australian game show

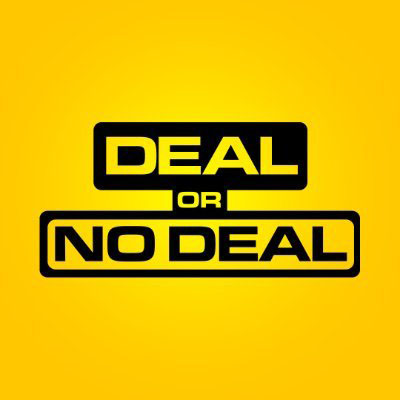
- Genre: Game show
- Based on: Deal or No Deal by John de Mol Jr.
- Presented by: Andrew O'Keefe (2003-2013); Grant Denyer (2024-present)
- Announcer: Kent Forbes; Marcus Irvine; John Deeks
- Country of origin: Australia
- Original language: English
- No. of seasons: 12
- No. of episodes: 2,323

Production
- Production locations: Global Television studios, South Melbourne, Victoria (2003–2013); Docklands Studios Melbourne (2024–)
- Camera setup: Multi-camera
- Running time: 44–52 minutes (weekly format); 22–26 minutes (daily format)
- Production companies: Endemol Southern Star (Note: Was known as Southern Star Endemol during Season 1) (2003–2009); Southern Star Group (Note: Season 8 uses individual logos instead) (2009–2013); Endemol Shine Australia (2024–)

Original release
- Network: Seven Network
- Release: 13 July 2003 – 4 October 2013
- Network: Network 10
- Release: 29 January 2024 – present

Deal or No Deal is an Australian game show which originally broadcast on the Seven Network from 13 July 2003 to 4 October 2013, hosted by Andrew O'Keefe. On 29 January 2024, a reboot series premiered on Network 10, hosted by Grant Denyer. It was the first international version of the game show, after the original Miljoenenjacht from the Netherlands, and it was the first of the versions to use the Deal or No Deal name.

Many changes were made to Deal or No Deal during its run. These included, among others, changing from a weekly format to a daily format, which resulted in the reduction of the top prize from $2,000,000 to $200,000 in 2004; interactive features inviting home viewers to play along with "Double Deal Friday"; and additional special features added to the game (such as "Double or Nothing" and "Super Case"). The show included many special episodes including several hour-long prime-time specials (such as the "Test of the Psychics Special" and the "Unluckiest Players Special") and the Dancing with the Deals specials which cross-promoted Dancing with the Stars.

The last episodes for Seven were produced in September 2013, and it was announced in March 2014 that no new episodes would be produced for the network, though repeats continued airing at 5:00 pm weeknights until September 2015. In August 2015 it was announced that the show, along with companion game show Million Dollar Minute, would be axed and replaced by a new one-hour game show titled The Chase Australia.

In October 2023, it was announced that Network 10 would be reviving the series in 2024, with new host Grant Denyer. The revived version of the game show airs at 6:00 pm weeknights following the flagship 5:00 pm edition of 10 News First and as the lead-in program to The Project starting on 29 January 2024. On June 30, 2025, it was announced that the show will move at 7:00 pm. In October 2025, it was revealed that the show would move to 6:30 pm in 2026, and be followed by the reboot of Millionaire Hot Seat. This new format features 22 numbered briefcases instead of the traditional 26. The top prize for this edition is $100,000, while the Celebrity Jackpot version's top prize is $250,000, then later $200,000.

== Format ==
=== Weekly format ===
==== Preliminary rounds ====
The game begins with 200 people in the audience divided into eight numbered "blocks" of 25. In the first round, the audience is divided into a red team (blocks 1–4) and a blue team (blocks 5–8). The players had to answer three multiple choice questions using keypads. Each correct answer scored their team a point, the team with the most points after the three questions moved on to the next round where the four blocks of the winning team played each other over three more questions. The block with the most points after this round moves onto "the podium". At this point, another player is selected at random from the remaining seven blocks to re-join the game.

The players on the podium play another round of trivia questions, this time playing individually. Players get points for correct answers equal to the number of players who answer incorrectly; for example, if 10 players answer correctly, that means 16 answered incorrectly, so the 10 players who answered correctly get 16 points each. In case of a tie, players are ranked by how quickly they lock in their answer. The two players with the highest score and/or fastest answers after five questions move on to "the Orb".

At the Orb, the two final players have to guess an answer with the help of up to six clues. The round is played in a sudden death style — if either player buzzes in and gives an incorrect answer or hesitates for too long, then their opponent wins and moves on to the main game.

==== Main game (Deal or No Deal round) ====
The last player is now asked to choose from 26 numbered briefcases which have had different dollar amounts placed in them (see Briefcase values and board layouts below). The remaining briefcases are distributed among the other 25 players from the podium round. The player must then select from those briefcases to be opened, beginning with six in the first round, each successive round choosing one less case until the sixth round when cases are chosen one at a time. After every round, the player receives an offer from "the Bank" who want to buy the player's case from them to stop them winning the value of their case. The player can choose to take the deal and take home the amount offered to them or decline the deal ("No Deal") and continue on to the next round. If the player decides to take the deal, the player continues selecting cases to find out if they made a good deal by selling for more than the value inside their chosen case. If the player makes it to the final two cases, then their case is opened and they win the value of their case.

As each briefcase is selected, the player holding it is asked to guess which of the remaining amounts is hidden in their case. If they are correct then they win an amount depending on which case selection round it is. In the first round, the prize for a correct guess is $6,000, but by the time the player is choosing one case at a time, the prize is $1,000.

=== Daily format ===
The game begins with 150 contenders divided into six numbered blocks of 25. One of these blocks gets chosen at random, along with one more player from any of the other five blocks, to play a preliminary quiz with three multiple-choice questions. The player with the most and/or fastest correct answers becomes the winner to play the main game. This was later changed to selecting one player with the other members of their block moves to the podium. The player then chooses their case and begins eliminating the other cases. The podium player receives a small if they guess the contents of their case correctly – this was $500 in the Channel 7 iteration and $250 in the Channel 10 iteration, unless there is a Mega Guess (Channel 7 iteration only) which could award amounts of $2000, $5000 or $10000. Some episodes may also include a voucher from Harvey Norman, which is automatically won if one of the cases has the Harvey Norman logo, or a subscription to Paramount+, which is only won if they get it right.

Later in the game, depending on the state of the game, a special feature may be offered by the Bank, see Features below.

== History ==
Deal or No Deal was based on the final game of Dutch game show Miljoenenjacht (English: The Hunt/Chase for Millions), created by Dick de Rijk for production company Endemol, that debuted on the show on 22 December 2002. Miljoenenjacht was itself based on the German show Die Chance deines Lebens (English: Your Chance of a Lifetime) which started in 2000 and was shown in both Germany and the Netherlands. The revised format from 2002 was an instant hit and was extended from six to eight shows, which led to the executives of Endemol offering the format at MipTV 2003, an important annual television trade fair taking places in Cannes, France, where the Dutch host Linda de Mol presented a promotion version of the show. On 23 June 2003, it was confirmed that Andrew O'Keefe would host the game show. The Australian network Seven purchased the format, and the first episode was aired on 13 July 2003, making it the first international adaptation of the Dutch show. Curiously, the show debuted on the same day when the Argentinian version Trato Hecho hosted by Julian Weich was launched.

The first Australian version was an hour-long program shown on Sunday nights at 7:30 pm. It indirectly competed with the Nine Network's Who Wants to Be a Millionaire? by offering a maximum prize of AU$2 million, doubling its rival's cash prize. The version also operated in a rolling format, much like Millionaire, whereby contestants who are unable to complete their game prior to the episode time expiring return in the following episode; for example, Nathan Cochrane, who progressed to the main game in the second episode, returned in third episode, where he won $515,000 the biggest amount of money won on the Australian version, and at the time was the biggest amount won on any Australian game show.

The show's logo from 2003 to 2006

On 2 February 2004, the show was relaunched as a half-hour format and moved to weeknights at 5:30 pm, directly competing against Nine's The Price Is Right. This version was more successful, due to the increased number of episodes airing (five per week compared to the previous one per week). The maximum prize was lowered from $2 million to $200,000 and the number of potential players reduced from 200 to 150 (six blocks of 25 instead of eight blocks). The preliminary game was also shortened—one block was selected at random as well as one more player selected at random. A short trivia quiz game was played to determine who would progress to the main game. The players left on the podium holding the unselected cases would be given be an opportunity to win $1,000 (later $500) by correctly guessing the contents of their case.

In the summer of 2004, several hour-long primetime specials were aired in addition to the regular 5:30 pm episodes. These specials were shown at 7:30 pm on Tuesday nights and raised the maximum prize back to $2 million and used a modified version of the 2003 board (see "Primetime specials" below). These special editions included "Biggest Winners – Dream Team", "Conflict of the Couples", "Unluckiest Players" and "Test of the Psychics". These specials aired after the 2004 Athens Olympics which replaced Deal or No Deal in August. Each show featured 26 contenders (or 13 couples in case of the "Conflict of the Couples" special) playing a preliminary quiz in order to determine who would go on to play for the top prize. Three of these special episodes (Conflict of the Couples, Unluckiest Players and Biggest Winners) brought the Orb round back where the two best players (or couples) had to guess an answer with the help of up to six clues in order to proceed to the main game. Several prime time specials also had special features: In the "Test of the Psychics" show, the winner was given a scarf which was hidden in the $2 million case and had to use their psychic abilities to work out which case was hiding the top prize. In "Conflict of the Couples", the winning couple was able to choose two cases but was forced to reject one of them after the first bank offer. The amount won in the "Biggest Winners - Dream Team" special was also won by a home winner who took part in an SMS competition. Shortly after these special episodes, the popularity of the show began to rise. In order to win the ratings The Price Is Right altered its showcase format to force contestants to choose between cash incentives or to continue playing the showcase. Despite this change, Deal or No Deal continued to grow in popularity, which contributed to the ratings surge of Seven News which followed directly afterwards. This popularity led Nine to cancel game shows such as The Price Is Right, Million Dollar Wheel of Fortune and the half-hour version of Millionaire titled Millionaire: Superseason. However, the ratings of Deal or No Deal later dropped due to the popularity of Millionaire Hot Seat.

Multiple choice question being asked in 2006

Many alterations have been made to the game since its debut, including the briefcase values (see Briefcase values and board layouts below) and the addition of new gameplay features (see Features below). The Super Case, Chance and Mega-Guess features were introduced during 2004's $12 Million Month, and have become recurring segments since. A car prize was introduced in 2005, replacing the $25,000 prize from the 2004 board. Cars featured have included the Peugeot 307 from 2005 to 2007 (briefly replaced by the Renault Mégane II in 2005), the Peugeot 306 in 2008, the Peugeot 207 in 2009, the Peugeot 206 in 2010 and the Peugeot 207CC from 2011 to 2013, all of which were valued over $30,000. The feature Double or Nothing was introduced in 2006, while in 2007 the preliminary quiz was dropped altogether. Double Deal Friday was removed from 2008.

The program celebrated its 200th Episode Party special (with 2 chances at $200,000) on 19 November 2004 and its 400th Episode Party special on 28 October 2005. The 1,000th episode was celebrated on 8 September 2008 and the contestant that day won $43,000.

The last new episodes were produced for Seven in September 2013, the same month that Million Dollar Minute debuted at a 5:30 pm time-slot. Million Dollar Minute was hosted by future Deal or No Deal host Grant Denyer. As a result, only repeat episodes were airing between October 2013 and September 2015 in a 5 pm time-slot. It was announced in March 2014 that no new episodes will be produced, and in August 2015 it was announced that the show, along with Million Dollar Minute, would be axed and replaced by a new one-hour game show titled The Chase Australia.

In October 2023, it was announced Network 10 would be reviving the series in 2024, with new host Grant Denyer. The revived version of the game show airs at 6:00 pm weeknights after the 5 pm edition of 10 News First and as the lead in program to The Project and the revival premiered on 29 January 2024, but it was originally intended to premiere on 5 February 2024.

=== Winners ===
In total, 6 contestants have managed to win the top prize. There have been four winners of the $200,000 top prize in Channel 7's daily iteration of the program, and as of September 2026, two have won the top prize of $100,000 ($250,000, then later $200,000 on the Celebrity Jackpot version) on the Channel 10 iteration. The top prize for the Prime Time version of $2 million was never won, but as previously mentioned, Nathan Cochrane won $515,000 after taking a deal in that version. On Channel 7's edition, confetti was released when top prize was won whereas the Channel 10's edition, no confetti was released.

Deal or No Deal Top Prize Winners
| Air Date | Contestant Name | Amount Won | Case No | Ref |
|---|---|---|---|---|
| 17 June 2004 | Dean Cartechini | $200,000 | 12 | |
| 19 September 2007 | Anh Do (celebrity) | $200,000 | 23 | |
| 2 June 2010 | Leanne Benbow | $200,000 | 21 | |
| 23 August 2011 | Chris Doyle | $200,000 | 9 | |
| 26 February 2025 | Zali Muscatello | $100,000 | 9 | |
| 30 June 2025 | Sandra Sully (celebrity) | $100,000 | 10 | |

=== Double Shot ===
Double Shot was a series of specials where a second $200,000 amount was placed in the briefcases, in place of the 50-cent amount. These specials are reportedly an answer to the premiere of Millionaire Hot Seat - airing in the same timeslot. Should a podium player guess that there is $200,000 in their case, they must decide whether it is the regular $200,000 one or the Double Shot version to prevent them having an extra chance of winning the bonus money. In the 10 Double Shot episodes that aired the total prize money won by contestants was $235,100.

=== Fantastic Four ===
The Fantastic Four was a series of specials that first aired 21–26 September 2009 and then randomly throughout the year, where the briefcases included an extra $50,000, $75,000 and $100,000 replacing the 50c, $750 and $1,000 amounts respectively (see Fantastic Four below). In the first five episodes aired, the total prize money won by contestants was about $124,000.

After the first run of specials, Fantastic Four was run as individual specials throughout the year. The total prize money won in the specials is $914,401.

The $200,000 top prize was originally replaced with $250,000; however this was later reversed.

=== Celebrity Jackpot ===
On 9 July 2024, it was confirmed that 10 would broadcast six hour-long primetime celebrity specials of the game show, in addition to the regular 6:00 pm episodes. These specials are shown on Monday nights, premiering on 22 July 2024, featuring celebrities including: comedian Tom Gleeson, MasterChef Australia judges Andy Allen and Sofia Levin, Gogglebox Australia stars, Collingwood Football Club premiership captain Darcy Moore, Matildas champ Kyah Simon and the winner of the tenth season of I'm A Celebrity…Get Me Out of Here!, Skye Wheatley. The celebrities play for a chance to win $250,000 for their chosen charity. Unlike the regular half-hour episodes, the "Celebrity Jackpot" specials use 26 briefcases, and the board is set to the 2006-2013 format with a Green $35,000 case replacing the Car case and the top prize of $250,000 being featured. In 2025, the "Celebrity Jackpot" format was rested, and episodes featuring celebrities playing for charity were included in the regular 30 minute episodes.

The "Celebrity Jackpot" format returned in 2026, with the celebrity contestants being TV presenter and The Traitors Australia host Gretel Killeen, comedian Denise Scott, the cast of the children's music group The Wiggles, comedians Anne Edmonds and Lloyd Langford, The Cheap Seats hosts Melanie Bracewell and Tim McDonald, and the cast of Gogglebox Australia for the second time. For this edition, the top prize was lowered to $200,000.

=== Briefcase values and board layouts ===
==== Original Series (Andrew O'Keefe) ====
2003 (S1)

Value
| $0.05 | $1,000 |
| $0.25 | $2,500 |
| $0.50 | $5,000 |
| $0.75 | $7,500 |
| $1 | $10,000 |
| $5 | $25,000 |
| $10 | $50,000 |
| $25 | $75,000 |
| $50 | $100,000 |
| $75 | $250,000 |
| $100 | $500,000 |
| $250 | $1,000,000 |
| $500 | $2,000,000 |

2004 (S2)

Value
| $0.50 | $1,000 |
| $1 | $1,500 |
| $2 | $2,000 |
| $5 | $3,000 |
| $10 | $5,000 |
| $25 | $7,500 |
| $50 | $10,000 |
| $75 | $15,000 |
| $100 | $25,000 |
| $150 | $50,000 |
| $250 | $75,000 |
| $500 | $100,000 |
| $750 | $200,000 |

Primetime specials (A) 2004

Value
| $0.50 | $1,000 |
| $1 | $2,500 |
| $2 | $5,000 |
| $5 | $7,500 |
| $10 | $10,000 |
| $25 | $25,000 |
| $50 | $50,000 |
| $75 | $75,000 |
| $100 | $100,000 |
| $200 | $250,000 |
| $300 | $500,000 |
| $500 | $1,000,000 |
| $750 | $2,000,000 |

Primetime specials (B) 2004

Value
| $0.50 | $1,000 |
| $1 | $2,500 |
| $2 | $5,000 |
| $5 | $7,500 |
| $10 | $10,000 |
| $25 | $25,000 |
| $50 | $50,000 |
| $75 | $75,000 |
| $100 | $100,000 |
| $200 | $250,000 |
| $250 | $500,000 |
| $500 | $1,000,000 |
| $750 | $2,000,000 |

200th show (19 November 2004)

Value
| $0.50 | $1,000 |
| $1 | $2,000 |
| $2 | $3,000 |
| $5 | $5,000 |
| $10 | $7,500 |
| $25 | $10,000 |
| $50 | $15,000 |
| $75 | $25,000 |
| $100 | $50,000 |
| $150 | $75,000 |
| $250 | $100,000 |
| $500 | $200,000 |
| $750 | $200,000 |

2005 (S3)

Value
| $0.50 | $1,000 |
| $1 | $1,500 |
| $2 | $2,000 |
| $5 | $3,000 |
| $10 | $5,000 |
| $25 | $7,500 |
| $50 | $10,000 |
| $75 | $15,000 |
| $100 | CAR |
| $150 | $50,000 |
| $250 | $75,000 |
| $500 | $100,000 |
| $750 | $200,000 |

2006–2013 (S4–S11)

Value
| 50¢ | $1,000 |
| $1 | $2,000 |
| $2 | $3,000 |
| $5 | $4,000 |
| $10 | $5,000 |
| $20 | $10,000 |
| $50 | $15,000 |
| $100 | $20,000 |
| $150 | CAR |
| $200 | $50,000 |
| $250 | $75,000 |
| $500 | $100,000 |
| $750 | $200,000 |

Fantastic Four

Value
| $50,000 | $100,000 |
| $1 | $2,000 |
| $2 | $3,000 |
| $5 | $4,000 |
| $10 | $5,000 |
| $20 | $10,000 |
| $50 | $15,000 |
| $100 | $20,000 |
| $150 | CAR |
| $200 | $50,000 |
| $250 | $75,000 |
| $500 | $100,000 |
| $75,000 | $200,000 |

Fantastic Four 2009

Value
| $50,000 | $100,000 |
| $1 | $2,000 |
| $2 | $3,000 |
| $5 | $4,000 |
| $10 | $5,000 |
| $20 | $10,000 |
| $50 | $15,000 |
| $100 | $20,000 |
| $150 | CAR |
| $200 | $50,000 |
| $250 | $75,000 |
| $500 | $100,000 |
| $75,000 | $250,000 |

Double Shot

Value
| $200,000 | $1,000 |
| $1 | $2,000 |
| $2 | $3,000 |
| $5 | $4,000 |
| $10 | $5,000 |
| $20 | $10,000 |
| $50 | $15,000 |
| $100 | $20,000 |
| $150 | CAR |
| $200 | $50,000 |
| $250 | $75,000 |
| $500 | $100,000 |
| $750 | $200,000 |

==== Revival Series (Grant Denyer) ====
2024– (S12–)

Value
| 50¢ | $1,000 |
| $1 | $2,500 |
| $5 | $5,000 |
| $10 | $7,500 |
| $25 | $10,000 |
| $50 | $20,000 |
| $75 | $30,000 |
| $100 | $40,000 |
| $250 | $50,000 |
| $500 | $75,000 |
| $750 | $100,000 |

Celebrity Jackpot 2024

Value
| 50¢ | $1,000 |
| $1 | $2,000 |
| $2 | $3,000 |
| $5 | $4,000 |
| $10 | $5,000 |
| $20 | $10,000 |
| $50 | $15,000 |
| $100 | $20,000 |
| $150 | $35,000 |
| $200 | $50,000 |
| $250 | $75,000 |
| $500 | $100,000 |
| $750 | $250,000 |

Celebrity Jackpot 2026

Value
| 50¢ | $1,000 |
| $1 | $2,000 |
| $2 | $3,000 |
| $5 | $4,000 |
| $10 | $5,000 |
| $20 | $10,000 |
| $50 | $15,000 |
| $100 | $20,000 |
| $150 | $25,000 |
| $200 | $30,000 |
| $250 | $50,000 |
| $500 | $75,000 |
| $750 | $200,000 |

== Features ==
Deal or No Deal has a number of special features that have been introduced since the show started. A number of these are endgame features which occur after the player takes a deal, but others have other requirements for activation.

=== Daily Prize ===
The Daily Prize is a feature that was introduced in 2004, where one of the briefcases (with the blue background) except the ones containing the CAR prize or the $100,000 or $200,000 (green coloured background) also contained gold stars. The holder of this case, regardless of being the main player or a podium player, wins $500. The Daily Prize was removed as a regular feature in 2006, however, it did return on special occasions that year, such as a Saint Patrick's Day–themed episode, a Mother's Day–themed episode and during the final week of the year.

=== Super Case ===
The Super Case is an endgame feature introduced in 2004 where an extra large prop case is revealed containing an extra cash value between 50 cents and $50,000, or up to $30,000 on Double Deal Friday. The Super Case occurs most often when the player has taken a deal worth approximately $10,000 with at least five cases left on the board. This generally means that the Super Case offers a 50/50 chance at equalling or bettering the offer, because four out of the eight possible values are $10,000 or better. During the 2006 season, the Super Case alert changed from a panel at the top of the screen to a little indicator beside the "Cases remaining" counter, this remains shown until the feature is actually activated.

=== Chance ===
The Chance is an endgame feature introduced in 2004 where the player is given an opportunity to rescind their deal and take the amount that is in their case. The Chance is only offered rarely if the last two amounts on the board are a small amount and an amount at least $5,000. For example, if a player has taken a deal for $6,500, but the last two amounts on the board are $750 and $10,000 they could be offered the Chance. If the player takes the Chance, they win whichever amount is inside their briefcase, otherwise they keep their $6,500 deal.

=== MegaGuess ===
The MegaGuess is a feature introduced during the $12 Million Month in 2004 that increases the value of the bonus money given to the next podium player if they correctly guess the contents of their case. Since 2006, the Mega-Guess has $2,000 (Blue), $5,000 (Maroon), and $10,000 (Green) variants, the $5,000 is the most common (sometimes used multiple times in a game), followed by $10,000 (usually appears early in a game) and $2,000 (often appears for podium players celebrating birthdays or from outside Victoria where the show was filmed). It often happens when the podium player is a friend or relative of the main player. The MegaGuess has developed as a small gag where either O'Keefe, the main player or the podium player would beg the unseen banker character to give the player a MegaGuess

The MegaGuess originally had a fixed prize of $10,000, however when it returned in 2005 it was reduced to $5,000. A $25,000 MegaGuess was offered to the player holding the 25,000th case to be opened in the show's history, however it wasn't won.

In the 2024 edition of Deal or No Deal, the Mega Guess has a fixed prize of $500.

=== Double Deal Friday ===
Double Deal Friday was a feature introduced in 2005, where viewers could register via a premium-rate telephone number to go into a draw to win the same prize as the main studio player on that Friday's episode. A similar format, called Dancing with the Deals, featured contestants from Dancing with the Stars; but in that version, the studio player did not win the prize, only the home viewer won. Double Deal Friday ended in 2008.

=== Double or Nothing ===
Double or Nothing is an endgame feature introduced in 2006 where the player is given an opportunity to choose between two cases that each contain either "Double" or "Nothing". If the player decides to play Double or Nothing, then they will either win double their deal amount or go home with no money.

The original format had Double or Nothing presented in a large case much like Super Case and the player could choose how much of their deal to gamble on the contents of the single case. The two cases format was introduced on 23 June 2006, and by 2007 the player could no longer choose how much to gamble, and must wager their entire deal.

=== Risk It All ===
Risk It All is an endgame feature introduced in 2010, which is offered to a player who has taken a deal under $10,000, but has two smaller amounts left in play. If the player decides to play, they must predict which of the two amounts is in their case. If they are correct they win $15,000, otherwise they lose their entire deal.

=== Switch Case ===
Switch Case is a feature introduced in 2010 where the bank will offer the player a chance to switch their briefcase with any unopened briefcase on the podium, and generally occurs in the middle of the game.

=== Dash for Cash ===
Dash for Cash is an endgame feature introduced in 2013 where the player is given a special offer of approximately half of the maximum prize available at that point, and is offered if that maximum prize is $5,000 or less. If the player takes this special deal then the game ends immediately and no further cases are eliminated.

=== Second Chance ===
The Second Chance is an endgame feature introduced in 2013 where the player is given an opportunity to switch the deal with one of the previous offers made earlier in the game, selected at random. When it is activated, a "Dealette" model will give a button to the contestant, which is pressed to confirm their decision to take the switched deal.

=== Quick Cash ===
In the 2024 reboot, randomly throughout the game, the Banker will give a certain amount of cash to them if they can impress the audience, or the Banker.

=== Consolation Prize ===
In the 2024 reboot, unlucky players may be given a $250 consolation prize.

=== Steal the Deal ===
In the reboot, at the end of the game, if the bonus is triggered, the player can choose to forfeit their winnings and choose one of eleven new briefcases, with amounts as follows;

Value
| 25¢ | $1,000 |
| $5 | $5,000 |
| $25 | $7,500 |
| $50 | $15,000 |
| $250 | $50,000 |
$500

Steal the Deal was introduced in January 2025.

=== Risk It ===
Not to be confused with Risk It All, Risk It is an endgame feature introduced in 2025 where if it's triggered (mainly if the player won less than $1,000), the player can choose to forfeit their winnings to choose one of two cases (similar to Double or Nothing) which can either contain 50¢, or $2,500.

=== Deal Wheel ===
The Deal Wheel is an endgame feature introduced in 2026 where after the main game, the player can choose to forfeit their winnings to spin a wheel containing 16 different amounts (8 small, 4 medium, and 4 big amounts, including a jackpot amount that is set by the banker). Whichever space they land on will be their new winnings total. Some episodes also has a voucher from Harvey Norman on the wheel.

== In popular culture ==
Andrew O'Keefe appeared as himself in an episode of the Australian comedy Kath & Kim, reprising his role as host of Deal or No Deal. In the episode, Sharon Strzelecki (portrayed by Magda Szubanski) appeared as the main contestant and Kim Craig (Gina Riley) appeared as her podium partner. Sharon wins $20,000 from her case (though footage of her winning is never shown). The gameplay shown has some minor changes compared to the actual game show airing at the time: Kim wasn't given the opportunity to make a guess for the contents of her case before opening it, and Sharon claims that she became the main contestant by having the "fastest fingers" (the preliminary quiz was dropped from the 2007 season, and the fictional game shown was of that version). O'Keefe also references the timeslot the show airs in by saying that it's "almost news time", as a teaser for Seven News 6pm bulletin would air in the final minutes of the show, which is followed by the news broadcast.

== Merchandise ==
Merchandise based on Deal or No Deal include a board game, a video game, an electronic game and a DVD game.

The board game, made by Crown and Andrews, features all parts of the game show, and is based on the 2004 season. The contents include 26 briefcases (a flat item with a number and a slot to hide the card of the cash amount), the board showing the amounts, 26 covers for the board, host and contestant cards, amount cards, instructions and money. An updated version was eventually released, based on the later seasons of the show.

The video game, available only for Nintendo DS, was developed by Gravity-i and published by Mindscape and features Andrew O'Keefe on the cover. The game uses the same engine as the British version of the same title, but with changes to make it more faithful to Australian game show, such as replacing the British boxes with the gold briefcases.

== See also ==
- Deal or No Deal
- Deal or No Deal Island - An American reality game spin-off that aired on 10Play.
- List of longest-running Australian television series
