= The Einstein Factor =

- Written by: Darren Chau; Vin Hedger
- Directed by: Peter Ots (2004); Jon Olb (2005–2006)
- Presented by: Peter Berner
- Composer: Michael Lira
- Country of origin: Australia
- No. of seasons: 6
- No. of episodes: 244

Production
- Executive producers: Ian Duncan; Shaun Levin; Bruce Kane
- Running time: 30 minutes

Original release
- Network: ABC1
- Release: 8 February 2004 – 22 November 2009

The Einstein Factor is an Australian television quiz show that was broadcast on ABC1. The programme was hosted by comedian and broadcaster Peter Berner. It was first broadcast in 2004. In 2009, the show commenced its sixth and final season, with the ABC announcing the program would not be renewed for the seventh season in 2010. The final episode aired on 22 November 2009. It was broadcast on Sunday nights at 6:30 pm from 2004 until 2009 and also on Tuesdays at 1:30pm on ABC. The Einstein Factor was created by Australian television producer, Barry O'Brien, and was produced by Sparkz with Ian Duncan and Shaun Levin as Executive Producers.

== Overview ==
The show's self-styled goal is to find the person who "knows everything about something and something about everything". To that end, contestants with specially nominated subjects appear each week. The show was also noted for Berner's offbeat manner and humorous approach to being a quizmaster. The program proved quite popular with a wide audience.

The key to the program's uniqueness is the use of a Brains Trust, a panel of three "experts", usually celebrities, who compete alongside the contestants. Regular Brains Trustees have included Barry Jones, Berner's radio colleagues Tony Moclair and Matt Parkinson, comedians Tim Ferguson and Michael Veitch, musician Red Symons, scientist Dr Karl Kruszelnicki, Former Temptation Grand Champ Stephen Hall and Actor, historian and musician Alice Garner.

== Show format ==
The first round simply involves Berner asking up to 15 questions to each contestant on their special subjects. The round ends either when the contestant answers all 15 questions or when 90 seconds elapses, whichever comes first. The subjects are often quite specific and the questions difficult for outsiders to know. Special subjects have included Stargate SG-1, Buffy the Vampire Slayer, Ned Kelly, Harry Potter, Star Wars, Doctor Who, Icelandic songstress Björk, Michael Collins and World War II aircraft. This will be followed by banter between contestant and brains trust. Each correct response earns the contestant 100 points. A "bonus" true or false question was introduced in the 2005 series which the contestant can either choose to answer themselves which a correct answer scores 100 points or place their faith in the Brains Trust to answer the question, in which case a correct answer yields 200 points, with no penalty for an incorrect answer.

In round two, contestants are given nine 'subject headings' which generally have only an indirect and allusive relation to the topic underneath—for example, a question labelled "Rock and Roll" is as likely to be about geology as it is music. However, in the first season these categories were a lot more clearly named. Contestants are asked to choose, in turn, one subject on which to receive a question. Each contestant makes two picks, so only six out of the nine subjects are asked. The question is then put to all contestants and the Brains Trust. The contestants are given five seconds to select their multiple choice answer, then the Brains Trust discusses the question and agree on its selection. If the Brains Trust gets the question right, all the players who also got the question right receive 50 points; if the Brains Trust are wrong, players who answered correctly receive 100 points. In the sixth season (2009), this round was changed so each player would select one category per round instead of two, and the Brains Trust also selected one category.

In round three, 15 questions are put to the contestants and the brains trust. Two questions come from each of the contestants' special subjects, which are mixed in with nine other general knowledge questions. The round is a "hands on buzzers" round as seen in many quiz shows, with the brains trust sharing a buzzer. Contestants who get a question right receive 100 points—an incorrect answer means 100 points are deducted from their score. The Brains Trust receives no points for correct answers, but their intervention can deprive the contestants of points, which is presumably why their buzzer made a different sound.

== Play-Offs and Finals ==
A season of The Einstein Factor can be divided into three parts of 13 episodes each plus the series grand final, bringing the total number of episodes in a season to 40. The winners of each programme's heats compete at the end of the series in a series of "Play-Offs", the winners of which compete in a "Series Final". The three winners of the "Series Finals" compete in "The Einstein Factor Grand Final" to determine the series overall winner. Specialised subjects remain the same throughout. The following list is the typical structure of the last third of every season, usually commencing in early to mid-August:

- 3 heats
- 1 Play-Off
- 3 heats
- 1 Play-Off
- 3 heats
- 1 Play-Off
- 1 Series Final
- 1 Grand Final

The Einstein Factor Series Winners
Seasons	Grand Final Air Date	Winner	Special Subject
Season 1	7 November 2004	Diana Burleigh	Gilbert and Sullivan
Season 2	13 November 2005	David Campbell	Dr. Who: 1963–1989
Season 3	12 November 2006	Virginia Noel	Classical Greek Mythology
Season 4	25 November 2007	Andrew McDonald	The Luftwaffe and its Aircraft 1936–1945
Season 5	23 November 2008	Paul Bahr	1975 Australian constitutional crisis
Season 6	22 November 2009	Andrew Whatham	The Life and Times of Wilhelm Canaris

== See also ==
- List of Australian television series
- List of programs broadcast by ABC (Australian TV network)
