= Who Wants to Be a Millionaire? (Australian game show) =

Australian game show

- Titlecard
- Also known as: Millionaire
- Genre: Game show
- Created by: David Briggs; Steven Knight; Mike Whitehill
- Directed by: Peter Ots
- Presented by: Eddie McGuire (1999-2006, 2007, 2010, 2021)
- Composers: Keith Strachan (1999–2006, 2021); Matthew Strachan (1999–2006, 2021); Ramon Covalo; Nick Magnus (2007, 2010, 2021)
- Country of origin: Australia
- Original language: English
- No. of seasons: 14 (original); 1 ($5 Million); 1 (Whizz Kids); 1 (Special Events)
- No. of episodes: 292 (original); 6 ($5 Million); 2 (Whizz Kids); 4 (Special Events)

Production
- Executive producer: Karen Greene
- Producer: Michelle Seers
- Production locations: GTV-9, Richmond, Victoria (1999–2007); Docklands Studios Melbourne (2010, 2021)
- Running time: 30 minutes (1999–2000); 60 minutes (2000–2006, 2010); 90 minutes (2007); 75 to 100 minutes (2021)
- Production companies: Grundy Television (1999–2001); Celador (1999–2006); 2waytraffic (2007, 2010); Sony Pictures Television (2021)

Original release
- Network: Nine Network
- Release: 18 April 1999 – 3 April 2006
- Release: 22 October – 26 November 2007
- Release: 27 February – 6 March 2010
- Release: 25 January – 13 May 2021

Related
- Millionaire Hot Seat

Who Wants to Be a Millionaire? is an Australian television game show which would offer a maximum cash prize of $1,000,000 for answering 15 successive multiple-choice questions of increasing difficulty. The show was based on and follows the same general format of the original version of the show from the United Kingdom, and is part of the international Who Wants to Be a Millionaire? franchise.

== History ==
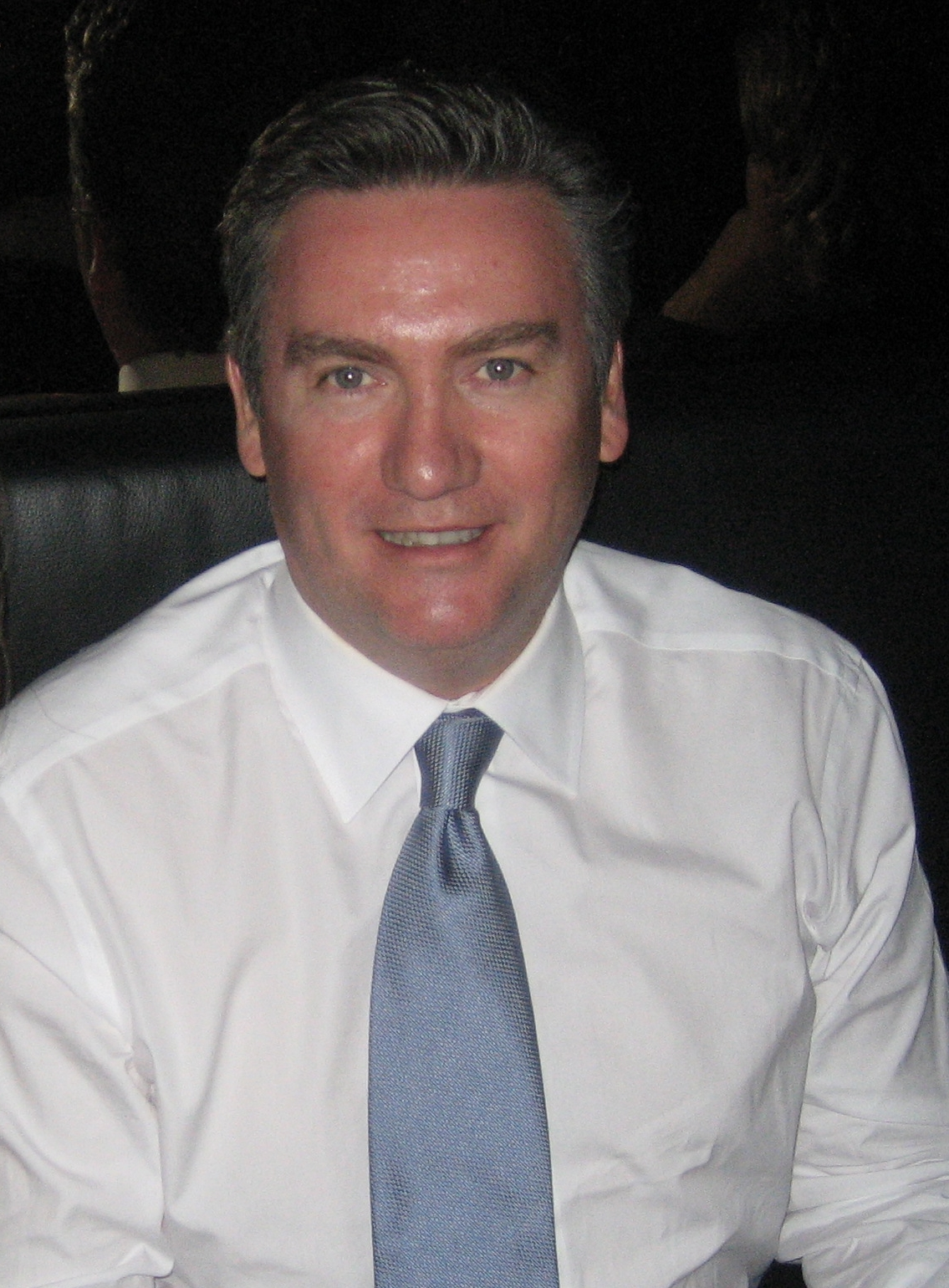
Host Eddie McGuire

Who Wants to Be a Millionaire? debuted in Australia on 18 April 1999 on the Nine Network and was hosted by Eddie McGuire.

Beginning with an eleven-question format starting at $1,000, this was later changed to the standard 15-question format and offered a top prize of $1 million. In the 2007 revision of the show, the new maximum prize money on offer is $5 million; however, in the 2010 revision the top prize reverted to $1 million. The show ran in the Monday 8:30 pm time slot between 1999 and 2006 except for a brief two-week period in 2004 where a shortened half-hour edition was put up against Seven's Deal or No Deal in the 5:30 pm time slot leading into the 6:00 pm evening news. This move was designed specifically to arrest declining ratings in Nine's Sydney market, where its once-dominant news bulletin was starting to be challenged by the rival Seven News in the ratings. This incarnation turned out to be a ratings failure, and it lasted for only one week.

This was the first country to have a fastest-finger round where two people answered the fastest at the same time. As a result, another question was asked but neither of them got it right, so a third question was asked. The fastest finger later on, instead of giving out one answer, two answers had to be given out to avoid any random guessing from happening. Later still, the contestants playing the fastest finger had to rank the four options in the correct order (as per the question), to avoid people winning Fastest Finger on a guess.

In the first few seasons, some questions often had a joke answer for the D choice (as with the US version of the show), for example, the question "The 80s band with the hit song 'Relax' was Frankie goes to... where?" had Collingwood offered as a D joke (this being a reference to Eddie McGuire being president of the Collingwood Football Club). Additionally, the Fastest Finger First segment from 1999 until 2003 required the ten contestants to give a correct answer as quickly as possible before reverting to the international standard of rules in 2004, where contestants had to order the four options in a row.

The 11 March 2002 episode of Who Wants to Be a Millionaire? scored a national audience of 1.51 million, just under 200,000 more than what The Weakest Link: The Mole Special achieved on the same night.

In April 2003, the British episode in which Charles Ingram cheated all the way to the top prize was aired on the Nine Network, featuring Ingram's run in its entirety, and watched by over two million Australians. At the time, the Australian version did both has two top prize winners. In 2001, an episode featuring Survivor winner Richard Hatch incorrectly answering his fourth question (see below) was also shown in the United States.

On 9 February 2006, it was announced that McGuire would become the new CEO of the Nine Network, filling a vacancy created by the departure of David Gyngell in May 2005. As a result of this, McGuire had to sacrifice his on-air commitments. However, unlike The AFL Footy Show where McGuire was replaced with Garry Lyon and James Brayshaw, the network could not find a suitable replacement. The final episode aired on 3 April 2006. The last contestant was Mr. Tony Egan of Wagga Wagga, NSW, who won $32,000.

=== Spin-offs ===
On 29 January 2007, McGuire returned to working in front of the camera, hosting the Australian version of the quiz show, 1 vs. 100. This was followed up with McGuire announcing on 18 May 2007 that he would be resigning as CEO of the Nine Network, and would be taking on a new position in programming services, as well as more on-screen roles. With the resignation officially taking effect on 30 June 2007, McGuire continued hosting 1 vs. 100 until poor ratings forced the hiatus of the program in October 2007.

On 20 August, it was announced that Nine's nightly quiz show Temptation would be rested for the remainder of the year and replaced with nightly half-hour editions of Millionaire to be aired between 7:00 and 7:30 pm However, with the return of David Gyngell to the CEO role in September he immediately announced that a new version of Who Wants to Be a Millionaire? would be broadcast live to air from 7:00 pm for 90 minutes on Monday night and that Temptation would be run on Tuesday to Friday nights from 7:00 pm.

=== 2007 format ===
Contestant Henry Kiss and the 16-question money tree

While this version is very similar to the original, with the program's return comes an additional lifeline which is obtained once a contestant reaches the second safe level of $32,000. The lifeline is called "Switch the Question" (also known as a "Flip"), where the contestant may dismiss the current question, see the answer, and to play a new one worth the same dollar amount. However, they will not have any lifelines used on the discarded question returned to them.

The lifeline first appeared in the UK program in a number of celebrity editions, and most recently in its 300th episode in 2002. It was also used the US version from 2004–2008. The idea was taken from the UK show The People Versus.

The most notable change to the format is the addition of a bonus 16th question, which is worth $5 million. After answering question 15 correctly, they have the option of going for the bonus question. Contestants giving the correct answer win $5 million (the largest top prize in the history of Australian TV game shows). However, contestants giving an incorrect answer win $32,000; a difference of $968,000.

In the past, contestants that use the Phone a Friend lifeline had to give out three phone numbers to choose from. However, in some cases, their friends sometimes were ready to look up the answers (such as asking people around for them, or going online for the answers). In the 2007 version, since the show was live, whenever a contestant was in the studio, their three friends would be seated in another studio room (in a Channel 9 studio in their nearby city) and not see or hear any questions or answers. This prevented any unfair advantage as they can watch the show live and look up the answers online.

Also, if McGuire believes that the contestant is taking too long to make a decision, the contestant may be put on a shot clock of 60 seconds. If the shot clock expires, the contestant is forced to walk away with their current winnings. This rule was introduced because the format was live. The previous format was pre-recorded where the producers could edit the contestant's deliberations in case they were longer than the producers preferred. The host has to make the decision, which is unlike the US version, which adopted a fixed 15 second (first five), 30 seconds (second five), 45 seconds (questions 11–14) and total time saved plus 45 seconds (15th question) clock in 2008.

Another notable change is the elimination of the preliminary Fastest Finger First rounds, similar to the syndicated US show. McGuire simply calls out the contestant's name and the contestant will enter the set and immediately sit in the hot seat, as opposed to before when 10 contestants had to answer a question correctly in the fastest time to get into the hot seat.

The series ran for its scheduled 6 episodes from 22 October to 26 November 2007.

The show this season used Rave graphic and soundtrack.

=== 2010 specials ===
On 27 February 2010, a primetime special called Whizz Kids: Who Wants to Be a Millionaire? was broadcast in which teams of students tried to win up to $1,000,000 for their school. Another episode was broadcast on 6 March 2010.

The special used the original format. Two lifelines also changed slightly. The Phone a Friend lifeline was called Phone the Teacher, students being able to call a teacher from their school. Also, as the show was prerecorded, the teachers had to be in a room where they could not see or hear the questions and answers in the studio to prevent them from looking up the answers through books or online or asking other teachers for the answer. The second lifeline change was that the Ask the Audience lifeline was called Ask the School, in which students from the contestants' school could vote using electronic keypads while they were watching the show being recorded. In addition, the "Switch the Question" lifeline was no longer available.

In total, the three schools, Engadine High School in NSW, Blackburn High School in Victoria and Frankston High School, also in Victoria, won $258,000 (the latter walked away with $8,000 whilst the remaining two schools won $125,000). The answers to the questions in which they walked away wounded up being wrong. Also, joke answers were introduced in these specials (most notably for the D choice), such as in a question about what attracts magnets in the second episode, a D) choice was offered as All the single ladies. For the record, the answer was 'iron' (but only after the Blackburn students asked the school).

Tony and John Koutsonikolas' $125,000 question, 6 March 2010 (used the 50:50 lifeline on the question)

$125,000 (12 of 15) – no time limit

Which of these painters is considered part of the Post-Impressionist movement?

1. Monet
2. Van Gogh(correct answer)
3. Dali
4. Renoir

Tony and John Koutsonikolas' $250,000 question

$250,000 (13 of 15) – no time limit

Including Kevin Rudd, how many men have been Australian prime minister?

1. 25
2. 26(correct answer)
3. 27
4. 28

The boys chose not to answer, and left with $125,000, not wanting to risk $93,000.

=== 2021 specials ===
On 25 January 2021, the series returned for 4 primetime specials called Who Wants to Be a Millionaire? Special Events. The first episode featured frontline workers playing for the $1,000,000 prize, while later episodes featured celebrities and sports stars playing for charity.

Like the 2010 Whizz Kids specials, these also use the original format. The Fastest Finger First round returns after a nearly 15-year absence, this time with 6 contestants instead of 10. The Switch the Question lifeline returned, replacing Phone a Friend, while Ask the Audience was replaced with Ask the Host.

This also marked the first time that both music were played during the questions, in this case, the Ramon Covalo music was played during the first ten questions, while the remaining five questions played the Keith & Matthew Strachan music.

=== Network 10 specials ===
On 18 March 2025, it was announced that the show would be returning for a new series of primetime specials for Network 10. Not much, however, is currently known about the series specials, including if Eddie McGuire is set to return as host.

== Payout structure ==
Three different ladders have been used over the course of the series:

Payout structure
Question number	Question value		
Question number	(Yellow zones are the guaranteed levels)		
Question number	1999–2000	2000–2006; 2010; 2021	2007
1	$1,000	$100	
2	$2,000	$200	
3	$4,000	$300	
4	$8,000	$500	
5	$16,000	$1,000	
6	$32,000	$2,000	
7	$64,000	$4,000	
8	$125,000	$8,000	
9	$250,000	$16,000	
10	$500,000	$32,000	
11	$1,000,000	$64,000	
12		$125,000	
13		$250,000	
14		$500,000	
15		$1,000,000	$1,000,000
16			$5,000,000

== Lifelines ==
During a contestant's game, they may make use of a set of lifelines to assist them on a question. Each lifeline may only be used once. Throughout the course of the show's history, these lifelines involve the following:

- 50:50: (1999–2006, 2007, 2010, 2021): Two incorrect answers are eliminated, leaving the contestant with a choice between the correct answer and one remaining incorrect answer.
- Phone a Friend: (1999–2006, 2007, 2010): The contestant calls a pre-arranged friend and is given 30 seconds to discuss the question with that person.
- Ask the Audience: (1999–2006, 2007, 2010): Audience members use keypads to vote on what they believe to be the correct answer to the question they've been asked. The percentage of each option selected by the audience is displayed to the contestant and audience after this vote.
- Switch (2007, 2021): The computer replaces one question with another of the same monetary value. Any lifelines already used on the original question are not reinstated. In the 2007 version, this lifeline was earned after correctly answering the $32,000 question. In the 2021 specials, it was made available from the start.
- Ask the Host (2021): This lifeline allows the contestant to ask for the host's advice on the current question and give the best possible answer.

== Hot Seat (2009–2023, 2026–present) ==
An abbreviated format of the show, Millionaire Hot Seat aired on weeknights on the Nine Network between April 2009 and November 2023. Like the original Millionaire, it was also hosted by Eddie McGuire.

A revival began airing on Network 10 on 2 February 2026. It is hosted by actress Rebecca Gibney.

== Notable contestants ==
=== Celebrities ===
Six celebrity contestants competed on a live episode of Millionaire on 17 July 2000: swimmer Nicole Livingstone (née Stevenson), actress Rachel Griffiths, television presenter Kerri-Anne Kennerley, English-Australian musician Red Symons (who lost on the $500,000 question), Irish-Australian comedian Jimeoin, and former Geelong AFL player-turned-commentator Sam Newman. On this particular episode, half of the contestants' totals were donated to charity while the other half was given to six at-home players. A total of $286,000 was raised during that episode, which was the first time in history that a live episode of Millionaire had aired anywhere in the world.

Other celebrity contestants to have competed on the show included:

- "Molly" Meldrum
- Shane Warne
- Pauline Hanson
- Alicia Molik
- Murray Cook
- Dame Edna Everage
- Paul "Fatty" Vautin
- Richard Hatch

=== Millionaires ===
To date there have only been 4 millionaires, 2 on the regular version and 2 on Millionaire Hot Seat (both in the original version):

==== Regular version ====
- Rob "Coach" Fulton: 17 October 2005

$1 million (15 of 15) – no time limit

Which of these popular 60s TV shows premiered first?

1. Bewitched(correct answer)
2. Get Smart
3. Hogan's Heroes
4. I Dream of Jeannie
- Martin Flood: 14 November 2005 (Used the 50–50 lifeline in the final question)

$1 million (15 of 15) – no time limit

Who was never 'Time' magazine's 'Man of the Year'?

1. Adolf Hitler(answer was eliminated either using the 50:50 lifeline or by choosing it while using the Double Dip lifeline)
2. Ayatollah Khomeini
3. Joseph Stalin(answer was eliminated either using the 50:50 lifeline or by choosing it while using the Double Dip lifeline)
4. Mao Zedong(correct answer)

==== Hot Seat version (Original version) ====
- Edwin Daly: 29 August 2016 (Third Australian Millionaire, the first since Martin Flood won it in 2005, and the first on the original version of the Hot Seat version)

$1 million (15 of 15) – 45 Seconds

Commonly known by his nickname, what was the full name of 'Banjo' Paterson?

1. Albert Burke
2. Andrew Barton(correct answer)
3. Adam Beaufort
4. Adrian Banks
- Antony McManus: 25 November 2021 (Fourth Australian Millionaire and the second on the original version of the Hot Seat version after Edwin Daly claimed the top prize)

Original question (Answer was selected after the Switch lifeline was used)

AU$1,000,000 (15 of 15) – 45 seconds

How many Australian prime ministers have been members for electorates in Queensland?

1. 1
2. 2
3. 3(chosen; incorrect answer)
4. 4(correct answer)

Switched question

$1 million (15 of 15) – 45 Seconds

Which of these classic literary works was published first?

1. The Count of Monte Cristo(correct answer)
2. A Tale of Two Cities
3. War and Peace
4. Les Misérables

=== $1 million question incorrect ===
To date only seven people have got the million dollar question wrong, all on the original version of Millionaire Hot Seat:

- Barry Soraghan: 8 June 2009

$1 million (15 of 15) – 45 seconds

Which of Hollywood's four Warner Brothers died on the eve of their landmark premiere of 'The Jazz Singer'?

1. Albert
2. Harry(chosen; incorrect answer)
3. Jack
4. Sam(correct answer)
- Jeff Tarr: 28 September 2009

$1 million (15 of 15) – 45 seconds

Horowitz is the original surname of which American actor?

1. Matt Damon(chosen; incorrect answer)
2. Johnny Depp
3. Julia Roberts
4. Winona Ryder(correct answer)
- Paul Wolfenden: 14 June 2010

$1 million (15 of 15) – 45 seconds

Famous for his Chinese Theatre, Sid Grauman had earlier opened which other Hollywood theatre in 1922?

1. French(chosen; incorrect answer)
2. Egyptian(correct answer)
3. Roman
4. Arabian
- Jim Graham: 20 June 2011

$1 million (15 of 15) – 45 seconds

On the current flag of the United Nations, which country is shown closest to the top of the flag?

1. New Zealand(correct answer)
2. Norway(chosen; incorrect answer)
3. Chile
4. Iceland
- Alan Edwards: 16 April 2012

$1 million (15 of 15) – 45 seconds

In 1935, which of these countries became the first to use an image of the future Queen Elizabeth on a bank note?

1. Australia
2. New Zealand
3. England(chosen; incorrect answer)
4. Canada(correct answer)
- Kevin Short: 13 May 2013

$1 million (15 of 15) – 45 seconds

Which of these Gilbert & Sullivan operettas was performed first?

1. The Gondoliers(chosen; incorrect answer)
2. The Pirates of Penzance(correct answer)
3. The Mikado
4. The Yeomen of the Guard
- Craig Anderson: 1 October 2018

$1 million (15 of 15) – 45 seconds

How many essential vitamins make up what is known as the 'B-complex'?

1. 6
2. 8(correct answer)
3. 10
4. 13(chosen; incorrect answer)

=== $500,000 question incorrect ===
- Red Symons: 17 July 2000

$500,000 (14 of 15) – no time limit

In which field did 16th century Italian Benvenuto Cellini achieve fame?

1. Painting
2. Architecture(chosen; incorrect answer)
3. Music
4. Sculpture(correct answer)
- Mickey Pragnell: 16 February 2004

$500,000 (14 of 15) – no time limit

How many milligrams in a metric carat?

1. 100
2. 200(correct answer)
3. 300(chosen; incorrect answer)
4. 400

=== $250,000 question incorrect ===
- Stephen ?: 20 April 1999

$250,000 (9 of 11) – no time limit

How many voyages did Christopher Columbus make to the New World?

1. One
2. Two(chosen; incorrect answer)
3. Three
4. Four(correct answer)
- Michael O’Conner: 12 November 2007

$250,000 (13 of 16) – no time limit

Which breed of dairy cow produces most of Australia’s milk?

1. Brown Swiss
2. Guernsey
3. Holstein Friesian(correct answer)
4. Jersey(chosen; incorrect answer)

=== $500,000 winners ===
- Trevor Sauer: 4 September 2000^{a}

$1 million (15 of 15) – No time limit

Who was the first to win two unshared Nobel Prizes?

1. Marie Curie
2. Ivan Pavlov
3. Linus Pauling(chosen; incorrect answer)
4. Albert Schweitzer
- William Laing: 16 October 2000^{a}

$1 million (15 of 15) – No time limit

How many humans have set foot on the moon?

1. 10
2. 12(chosen; incorrect answer)
3. 14
4. 16
- Dave and Denise Moser: 4 June 2001 (Used the 50–50 and Phone a Friend lifelines in the final question)

$1 million (15 of 15) – No time limit

What was the original name of Dorothea Mackellar’s poem 'My Country'?

1. The Wide Brown Land
2. 'Tis my home
3. A Sunburnt Country
4. Core of my heart(chosen; incorrect answer)
- Maria McCabe: 8 April 2002 (Used the 50–50 and Ask the Audience lifelines in the final question)^{a}

$1 million (15 of 15) – No time limit

Which of the following is not one of Geoffrey Chaucer's 'Canterbury Tale' tellers?

1. The Clerk
2. The Hunter(chosen; incorrect answer)
3. The Summoner
4. The Cook
- Molly Meldrum: 28 April 2003

$1 million (15 of 15) – No time limit

Mocha, a choice variety of coffee, takes its name from a seaport in which country?

1. Somalia
2. Yemen(chosen; incorrect answer)
3. Oman
4. Djibouti
- Andrew Lockett: 8 September 2003 (Used the Phone a Friend lifeline in the final question)

$1 million (15 of 15) – No time limit

There have been how many Dalai Lamas?

1. 13
2. 14(chosen; incorrect answer)
3. 15
4. 16
- Scott Smith: 4 October 2004

$1 million (15 of 15) – No time limit

Which saint founded the Italian hilltop monastery of Monte Cassino?

1. Benedict(chosen; incorrect answer)
2. Bernard
3. Bonaventure
4. Boniface
- Shane Warne and Trevor Sauer: 14 February 2005 (Used the Phone a Friend lifeline in the final question)

$1 million (15 of 15) – No time limit

Which song was the first of a string of No.1 US hits for the Supremes?

1. Baby Love
2. Stop! In the Name of Love
3. Where Did Our Love Go(chosen; incorrect answer)
4. You Can't Hurry Love
- Clifford Plumpton: 27 June 2005

$1 million (15 of 15) – No time limit

Which great filmmaker has won the most Best Director Oscars?

1. Frank Capra
2. John Ford(chosen; incorrect answer)
3. David Lean
4. Billy Wilder
- Yael Blinco: 21 November 2005 ("Mummy Wants To Be A Millionaire" special)

$1 million (15 of 15) – No time limit

Registering 9.5 on the Richter scale, the most powerful earthquake ever recorded struck where?

1. Alaska
2. Chile(chosen; incorrect answer)
3. China
4. Siberia

==== Notes ====
- a Would have won $1,000,000 had they chosen to answer the question.

=== $250,000 winners ===
- Paddy Spooner: 28 April 1999 (also appeared on the British version of the show where he won the same amount in pounds and the Irish version where he only won €1,000)

$500,000 (10 of 11) – No time limit

In which of the sciences did Australian Sir T. W. Edgeworth David specialize?

1. Geology(correct answer)
2. ?
3. Chemistry
4. ?

Spooner chose not to answer, winning $250,000.

- Brett McDonald: 3 July 2000

$500,000 (14 of 15) – No time limit

In area, which is the largest South American country wholly above the equator?

1. Colombia(chosen; incorrect answer)
2. Ecuador
3. Peru
4. Venezuela(correct answer)

McDonald chose not to answer, winning $250,000. (He died in a car crash five months later after his appearance)

- Rob & Loretta Valenda: 12 March 2001

$500,000 (14 of 15) – No time limit

Chicago mayor Anton Cermak was killed in the assassination attempt on which US president-elect?

1. Theodore Roosevelt
2. Woodrow Wilson(chosen; incorrect answer)
3. Franklin Roosevelt(correct answer)
4. Harry Truman

The Valendas chose not to answer, winning $250,000.

- Charles Davis: 9 July 2001
- Bruce Mump: November 2001
- Christopher Fare: 13 May 2002

$500,000 (14 of 15) – No time limit

Which Australian novelist won the inaugural Miles Franklin Award?

1. Alan Marshall
2. Thomas Keneally
3. Nevil Shute
4. Patrick White(correct answer)

Fare chose not to answer, winning $250,000, but had he been brave enough, could have played for the million.

- Bill Copland: 10 June 2002 (also appeared on the British version of the show where he won nothing).

$500,000 (14 of 15) – No time limit

In which year did Britain and its colonies adopt the Gregorian calendar?

1. 1552
2. 1652
3. 1752(correct answer)
4. 1852

Copland chose not to answer, winning $250,000, but had he been brave enough, could have played for the million.

- Tony Barber: 12 August 2002 (live "Battle of the Game Show Hosts" celebrity special)

$500,000 (14 of 15) – No time limit

Who was the first Australian-born winner of the Nobel Prize?

1. Macfarlane Burnet
2. Howard Florey(chosen; incorrect answer)
3. Lawrence Bragg(correct answer)
4. John Cornforth

Barber chose not to answer, winning $250,000.

- Jonathan Evans: 26 May 2003

$500,000 (14 of 15) – No time limit

A decisive defeat for Napoleon, and also called the Battle of the Nations, was 1813's Battle of what?

1. Leipzig(correct answer)
2. Austerlitz
3. Marengo
4. Friedland

Evans chose not to answer, winning $250,000, but had he been brave enough, could have played for the million.

- Tim Serisier: 2 June 2003

$500,000 (14 of 15) – No time limit

In 1859 the world's first successful oil well was drilled near Titusville, in which US state?

1. Pennsylvania(correct answer)
2. Kentucky
3. Ohio
4. Illinois

Serisier chose not to answer, winning $250,000, but had he been brave enough, could have played for the million.

- David Morgan: 8 March 2004

$500,000 (14 of 15) – No time limit

Mercury orbits the sun once every how many earth-days?

1. 58
2. 68
3. 78
4. 88(correct answer)

Morgan chose not to answer, winning $250,000, but had he been brave enough, could have played for the million.

- Rowan McGillicuddy: 28 June 2004

$500,000 (14 of 15) – No time limit

In which year was the Archibald Prize first awarded?

1. 1916
2. 1921(correct answer)
3. 1926
4. 1931(chosen; incorrect answer)
- Alan Tomlinson: 13 September 2004

$500,000 (14 of 15) – No time limit

Which term describes a perfect diamond weighing 100 carats or more?

1. Classic
2. Exemplar
3. Acme(chosen; incorrect answer)
4. Paragon(correct answer)
- Kay Balzer: 2004
- Pauline Hanson and Christopher Fare: 14 February 2005
- Christopher Connolly: 5 September 2005
- Henry Kiss: 26 November 2007 (final ever show featuring the normal format)

$500,000 (14 of 16) – No time limit

The Schick test establishes if a person has immunity to which disease?

1. Tuberculosis(chosen; incorrect answer)
2. Cholera
3. Polio
4. Diphtheria(correct answer)

Kiss chose not to answer, winning $250,000.

=== Controversies and other notable events ===
- In 2000, Richard Hatch became the first contestant in the Australian version to win nothing by bombing on his 4th question (see above). He was also the first celebrity contestant of the worldwide Millionaire franchise to win nothing.
- Paddy Spooner, who won $250,000 in 1999, also appeared on the British version of the show, also winning the same amount in pounds in 2000.

He was later the subject of an article in the Northampton Chronicle and Echo. The article stated that a syndicate, understood to have been run by quiz buff Paddy Spooner, aimed to exploit the selection procedure and increase the chances of beating 100,000 others in the race to appear on the show. The Chronicle & Echo had learned the syndicate accused of fast-tracking contestants on to the show managed to get hold of tie-breaker style questions likely to be used on phone lines rung by members of the public. Potential contestants were then told possible answers in return for a percentage of any future cash winnings.

==== Martin Flood cheating allegation ====
In November 2005, Martin Flood became the show's second jackpot winner. However, it was alleged that he may have cheated in his first appearance of the show (similar to that of British cheat Charles Ingram); a suggestion Flood himself was unaware of until his jackpot win in the following episode. This investigation by A Current Affair helped to boost the ratings for the episode of his top prize win; however, after this, Flood was cleared by the Nine Network of any wrongdoing.

== DVD ==
On 27 October 2004, a Who Wants to Be a Millionaire? interactive multiplayer DVD game was released. Also a picture edition was also released in 2005 offering the choice of either adult and junior questions.

== See also ==
- Family Feud
- Millionaire Hot Seat
- 1 vs. 100
- The Weakest Link
- The Chase Australia
- Letters and Numbers
- Wheel of Fortune (Australian game show)
