= The Chase Around the World =

- Genre: Game show
- Presented by: Bradley Walsh
- Starring: Mark Labbett; Shaun Wallace; Anne Hegerty; Paul Sinha; Jenny Ryan; Darragh Ennis
- Country of origin: United Kingdom
- Original language: English
- No. of series: 1
- No. of episodes: 6

Production
- Running time: 60 minutes
- Production company: Bright Entertainment

Original release
- Network: ITV
- Release: 16 July 2026 – present

The Chase Around the World is a British television game show, first aired on ITV on 16 July 2026. A spin-off of The Chase, it shares host Bradley Walsh and chasers Mark Labbett, Shaun Wallace, Anne Hegerty, Paul Sinha, Jenny Ryan and Darragh Ennis.

In the series, six pairs compete against each other for a £100,000 jackpot. They must answer general knowledge questions set by the chasers to navigate their way around a European city and to the finish line.

== Gameplay ==
Six pairs of contestants compete against each other for a £100,000 jackpot. By answering general knowledge questions set by the chasers, they find their way around a European city and to the finish line. Some questions involve finding the right landmark to answer a multiple choice question, or choosing the right answer on a tablet computer. Some questions involve making a connection, such as the names of the five members of the group Steps being a clue to go to the Spanish Steps in Rome. The last pair to reach the finish line compete in a quiz against the two chasers, and if they lose they are eliminated.

== Production ==
In April 2025, TV Zone UK reported seeing a production listing for a television pilot for The Chase Around the World, produced the previous month. In December, casting was announced, though the show's format and involvement of Walsh and the chasers was not confirmed until the new year.

Filming took place in April and May 2026. During filming, Wallace and Sinha were recognised by a stag party in Lisbon; the chasers told the tourists not to post their photographs until July, as to avoid spoilers; Labbett and Hegerty were hiding from contestants in Rome and were recognised, but not called out, by British tourists. Contestants were sworn to non-disclosure agreements and had their telephone calls monitored to avoid sharing results with family members, of which only a select number could know that the contestants were on the show.

In September 2026, a series spokesperson denied rumours of the cancellation of The Chase Around the World.

== Reception ==
=== Critical reception ===
The Chase Around the World received a three-star review from Katie Rosseinsky in The Independent and Sheen McGinley in the Irish Independent. Both considered it to be derivative of the BBC's Race Across the World and Destination X. McGinley praised the bravery of the decision to move The Chase from a studio setting, while Rosseinsky believed that such a transition did not work and involved too many scenes of contestants answering questions on tablet computers.

=== Ratings ===
The first episode of The Chase Around the World received an audience of 2,465,700, ranking as ITV's 12th most viewed programme of the week and 33rd overall, in the week that the 2026 FIFA World Cup concluded. The show did not make the top 50 in any other week.
