= Let's Sing and Dance =

British television programme

- Also known as: Let's Dance for Comic Relief; Let's Dance for Sport Relief
- Genre: Talent show
- Presented by: Steve Jones; Claudia Winkleman; Alex Jones; Mel Giedroyc; Sue Perkins
- Country of origin: United Kingdom
- Original language: English
- No. of series: 6
- No. of episodes: 25

Production
- Production locations: BBC Television Centre (2009–2013); BBC Elstree Centre (2017)
- Running time: 75–90 minutes
- Production company: Whizz Kid Entertainment

Original release
- Network: BBC One
- Release: 21 February 2009 – 9 March 2013
- Release: 4 March – 25 March 2017

Let's Sing and Dance, formerly known as Let's Dance, is a British television programme shown on BBC One, featuring celebrities performing famous dance routines to raise money for the charities Comic Relief and Sport Relief. The programme was presented by Steve Jones and Alex Jones, who replaced previous host Claudia Winkleman in 2011. In the first series, Anton du Beke was a regular judge, appearing alongside two guest panellists, but in the second series onwards, three guest judges were on the panel each week.

The first series aired between 21 February and 14 March 2009 and was won by Robert Webb. It raised over £300,000 for Comic Relief. The second series, in aid of Sport Relief, aired from 20 February 2010 until 14 March and was won by Rufus Hound. The third series aired between 19 February 2011 and 12 March in aid of Comic Relief, and was won by James Thornton and Charlie Baker. A fourth series aired from 18 February until 17 March 2012 in aid of Sport Relief, and was won by Rowland Rivron. The fifth ran from 16 February 2013 until 9 March 2013, and was won by Antony Cotton. The series' finale was the last Saturday night show to be broadcast live from BBC Television Centre.

On 6 October 2016, the BBC announced that the show would return for Red Nose Day 2017 as Let's Sing and Dance for Comic Relief. On 28 October 2016, it was announced that Mel Giedroyc and Sue Perkins would host the show. In 2018, it was reported that the Let's Sing and Dance was cancelled after six series.

== Format ==
The four-part series was announced by the BBC in January 2009 as part of the corporation's events surrounding Red Nose Day 2009, hosted by Steve Jones and Claudia Winkleman. For the first three programmes, six celebrity acts each recreated a famous dance routine. Viewers then voted for their favourite performer, with the proceeds from their calls going to Comic Relief/Sport Relief. The act with the most viewer votes went through to the final, and the three panellists chose a second act from the top three to go through. The top six acts then returned for the final.

In 2011, Winkleman was replaced by The One Show host Alex Jones.

== Episode guide ==
=== Series 1 (2009) ===
==== Heat 1 (21 February) ====
The guest panellists the first week were Emma Bunton and Michael McIntyre. The programme also premièred the video for the charity single "Islands in the Stream" released by Gavin & Stacey actors Ruth Jones and Rob Brydon and featuring Tom Jones. The acts were, in order of performance:

Act	Dance	Status
EastEnders	"We're All in This Together" — from High School Musical	Eliminated by the panel
Nicki Chapman & Christopher Biggins	"You're the One That I Want" — from Grease	Eliminated
Robert Webb	"Flashdance... What a Feeling" — from Flashdance	Saved by public vote
The Chefs	"Thriller" — Michael Jackson	Eliminated
Les Dennis	"You Should Be Dancing" — from Saturday Night Fever	Eliminated
Dick & Dom	"Shake a Tail Feather" — from The Blues Brothers	Saved by the panel

- EastEnders consisted of Cliff Parisi and John Partridge
- The Chefs consisted of Sophie Grigson, Nancy Lam, Sophie Michel, Reza Mohammad, John Burton Race, Paul Rankin, Silvena Rowe, Tony Tobin and Kevin Woodford

==== Heat 2 (28 February) ====
The guest panellists for the second week were Jamelia and Paul O'Grady. The acts were, in order of performance:

Act	Dance	Status
Hollyoaks	"Footloose" — from Footloose	Eliminated
Jo Brand	"...Baby One More Time" — Britney Spears	Saved by the panel
The Dragons	"Let's Face the Music and Dance" — Nat King Cole	Eliminated
Paddy McGuinness & Keith Lemon	"(I've Had) The Time of My Life" — from Dirty Dancing	Saved by public vote
Blue Peter	"Jailhouse Rock" — Elvis Presley	Eliminated by the panel
Neil Fox & Nancy Sorrell	"Candyman" — Christina Aguilera	Eliminated

- Hollyoaks consisted of Loui Batley, Nathalie Emmanuel, Garnon Davies, Dominique Jackson and Ricky Whittle
- The Dragons consisted of Duncan Bannatyne, Peter Jones and Deborah Meaden
- Blue Peter consisted of Mark Curry, Peter Duncan, Janet Ellis, Diane-Louise Jordan, Helen Skelton, Anthea Turner and Tim Vincent

==== Heat 3 (7 March) ====
The guest panellists for the third week were Lisa Snowdon and Dara Ó Briain. The acts were, in order of performance:

Act	Dance	Status
Angela Rippon	"Big Spender" — from Sweet Charity	Eliminated
Dom Joly	"U Can't Touch This" — MC Hammer	Eliminated
Zoe Ball & Suggs	"You Never Can Tell" — from Pulp Fiction	Eliminated
Denise Lewis & Martin Offiah	"Shakalaka Baby" — from Bombay Dreams	Saved by the panel
Fern Britton	"Singin' in the Rain" — from Singin' in the Rain	Eliminated by the panel
The Bill	Riverdance — from Riverdance	Saved by the public vote

- At the end of her performance, Britton was joined by husband Phil Vickery
- The Bill consisted of Patrick Robinson and Lisa Maxwell

==== Final (14 March) ====
The guest panellists for the final week were Denise van Outen and Michael McIntyre. Ruth Jones, Rob Brydon and Tom Jones performed their charity single "Islands in the Stream", Alesha Dixon performed "Let's Get Excited" and the cast of Hairspray performed "You Can't Stop the Beat". Two acts from each heat returned for the final, and they were, in order of performance:

Act	Dance	Status
Dick & Dom	"Shake a Tail Feather" — from The Blues Brothers	Out of running
Paddy McGuinness & Keith Lemon	"(I've Had) The Time of My Life" — from Dirty Dancing	Runners up
Denise Lewis & Martin Offiah	"Shakalaka Baby" — from Bombay Dreams	Out of running
Jo Brand	"...Baby One More Time" — Britney Spears	Out of running
The Bill	Riverdance — from Riverdance	Out of running
Robert Webb	"Flashdance... What a Feeling" — from Flashdance	Winner

=== Series 2 (2010) ===
In November 2009 it was confirmed on that the show would return but this time in aid of Sport Relief. Winkleman and Jones returned to host the show which kicked off on Saturday 20 February 2010. The contestants were to be judged by an all-new panel that saw the judging line-up change for all four shows (a format that would remain for the next two series).

==== Heat 1 (20 February) ====
- Panellists: Frank Skinner, Kimberley Walsh and Jason Manford
- Performances:
  - Sugababes – "Wear My Kiss"
  - JLS – "One Shot"

Act	Dance	Status
Rufus Hound	"Fight for This Love" — Cheryl Cole	Saved by the public vote
Olympians	"Vogue" — Madonna	Eliminated
Katy Brand	"Single Ladies (Put a Ring on It)" — Beyoncé	Saved by the panel
Darts & Snooker	"Walk This Way" — Aerosmith and Run DMC	Eliminated
Newsreaders	"Kiss of Fire" — Georgia Gibbs	Eliminated
Casualty and Holby	"Jai Ho!" — from Slumdog Millionaire	Eliminated by the panel

- Olympians consisted of Dalton Grant, Iwan Thomas, Mark Foster, Leon Taylor, Heather Fell and Jamie Baulch
- Snooker was represented by Dennis Taylor and Willie Thorne, and darts was represented by Bobby George and Tony O'Shea
- Newsreaders consisted of Ellie Crisell, Louise Minchin and Matt Barbet
- Casualty was represented by Charles Dale (Big Mac), Tony Marshall (Noel Garcia) and Ben Turner (Jay Faldren)
- Holby City was represented by Rosie Marcel (Jac Naylor) and Luke Roberts (Joseph Byrne)

==== Heat 2 (27 February) ====
- Panellists: Miranda Hart, Paddy McGuinness and Kelly Brook
- Performances
  - Priscilla Queen of the Desert
  - Gabriella Cilmi – "On A Mission"

Act	Dance	Status
Sam and Mark	"Wake Me Up Before You Go-Go" — Wham!	Eliminated by the panel
Boxers	"Bad Guys" — from Bugsy Malone	Eliminated
Shappi Khorsandi	"Hey Mickey" — Toni Basil	Eliminated
Debra Stephenson	"Smooth Criminal" — Michael Jackson	Saved by the panel
Michael Fish and the Weather Girls	"It's Raining Men" — The Weather Girls	Eliminated
Richard Arnold and Kate Garraway	"Born To Hand Jive" — from Grease	Saved by the public vote

- Boxers consisted of Carl Froch, Johnny Nelson, Tony Jeffries and Duke McKenzie
- The Weather Girls consisted of Lara Lewington, Clare Nasir and Becky Mantin accompanied by Michael Fish

==== Heat 3 (6 March) ====
- Panellists: Denise Van Outen, Vic Reeves and Jo Brand
- Performances:
  - Justin Bieber – "Baby"
  - Cast of Chicago – "All That Jazz"

Act	Dance	Status
The Bill	"Hips Don't Lie" — Shakira	Eliminated
Grumpy Old Women	"Poker Face" — Lady Gaga	Saved by the panel
Cheryl Fergison	"Ice Ice Baby" — Vanilla Ice	Saved by the public vote
Stephen K Amos	"Rhythm of Life" — from Sweet Charity	Eliminated
Bellamy's People	"Rasputin" — Boney M.	Eliminated
The Footballers	"Men in Black" — Will Smith	Eliminated by panel vote

- The Bill consisted of Sally Rogers and Chris Simmons
- The Grumpy Old Women consisted of Jenny Eclair, Linda Robson, Susie Blake and Lesley Joseph
- Bellamy's People consisted of Felix Dexter, Lucy Montgomery and Rhys Thomas
- The Footballers consisted of Peter Shilton and Jason Cundy

==== Final (13 March) ====
- Panellists: Robert Webb, Jon Culshaw and Jack Dee
- Performances: N-Dubz and the cast of Billy Elliot

Act	Dance	Status
Richard Arnold and Kate Garraway	"Born To Hand Jive" — from Grease	Out of running
Katy Brand	"Single Ladies (Put a Ring on It)" — Beyoncé	Runner-Up
Grumpy Old Women	"Poker Face" — Lady Gaga	Out of running
Debra Stephenson	"Smooth Criminal" — Michael Jackson	Out of running
Cheryl Fergison	"Ice Ice Baby" — Vanilla Ice	Out of running
Rufus Hound	"Fight for This Love" — Cheryl Cole	Winner

- Cheryl Fergison injured her leg in rehearsals and was unable to perform. However, she remained in the competition, having her previous performance shown instead.

=== Series 3 (2011) ===
On 26 January 2011 it was confirmed the show was returning for another series. Steve Jones hosted the show along with The One Show's Alex Jones. It ran from 19 February until the final on 12 March, when Charlie Baker and James Thornton were crowned champions with their rendition of "Puttin' On The Ritz".

==== Heat 1 (19 February) ====
- Panellists: Graham Norton, Frank Skinner and Greg Davies
- Performances:
  - JLS – "Eyes Wide Shut"
  - Taio Cruz and Kimberly Wyatt – "Higher"

Act	Dance	Status
Colin and Justin	"Xanadu" — Olivia Newton-John	Eliminated
Russell Kane	"Crazy in Love" — Beyoncé	Saved by the public vote
Rebecca Front	"It's Oh So Quiet" — Björk	Eliminated
Waterloo Road	"It's Like That" — Run-D.M.C.	Eliminated by the panel
Ed Byrne	"I Love to Boogie" — from Billy Elliot	Eliminated
Katie Price	"I Want to Break Free" — Queen	Saved by the panel

- Waterloo Road consisted of Philip Martin Brown and Rebecca Ryan
- Arlene Phillips featured in Ed Byrne's performance

==== Heat 2 (26 February) ====
- Panellists: Jack Whitehall, Lee Mack and Keith Lemon
- Performances:
  - Cee-Lo Green – "Bright Lights, Bigger City"
  - McFly – "That's The Truth"

Act	Dance	Status
Penny Smith	"Toxic" — Britney Spears	Eliminated
Lulu	"Crank That" — Soulja Boy	Eliminated by the panel
Andi Osho	"Bad" — Michael Jackson	Eliminated
Noel Fielding	"Wuthering Heights" — Kate Bush	Saved by the panel
James Thornton and Charlie Baker	"Puttin' on the Ritz" — Fred Astaire	Saved by the public vote
Jarred Christmas	"Hung Up" — Madonna	Eliminated

==== Heat 3 (5 March) ====
- Panellists: Jo Brand, John Bishop and Felix Dexter
- Performances:
  - The Wanted – "Gold Forever"
  - Jessie J – "Price Tag"

Act	Dance	Status
Marcus Brigstocke	"Kung Fu Fighting" — Carl Douglas	Eliminated
Joe Swash and Caroline Flack	"My Humps" — The Black Eyed Peas	Eliminated by the panel
Adrian Edmondson	"The Dying Swan" — Mikhail Fokine	Saved by the public vote
Simon Brodkin	"Club Tropicana" — Wham!	Eliminated
Iain Lee	"Gettin' Jiggy Wit It" — Will Smith	Eliminated
The 80s Supergroup	"Greased Lightnin'" — from Grease	Saved by the panel

- The 80s Supergroup consisted of Chesney Hawkes, Clare Grogan, Toyah Willcox and Limahl
- Rik Mayall reunited with Edmondson during his routine

==== Final (12 March) ====
- Panellists: Rufus Hound, Miranda Hart, and Louie Spence
- Performances:
  - Plan B – "Writing's on the Wall"
  - Nicole Scherzinger – "Don't Hold Your Breath"

Act	Dance	Status
Katie Price	"I Want to Break Free" — Queen	Out of running
James Thornton and Charlie Baker	"Puttin' on the Ritz" — Fred Astaire	Winner
Noel Fielding	"Wuthering Heights" — Kate Bush	Out of running
The 80s Supergroup	"Greased Lightnin'" — from Grease	Out of running
Ade Edmondson	"The Dying Swan" — Mikhail Fokine	Out of running
Russell Kane	"Crazy in Love" — Beyoncé	Runner up

- Noel Fielding's Mighty Boosh comedy partner Julian Barratt appeared at the end of his performance as Heathcliff.

=== Series 4 (2012) ===
On 10 December 2011 it was confirmed the show was returning for another series. Steve Jones and Alex Jones continued to host the show which ran for 5 episodes from 18 February until 17 March 2012.

==== Heat 1 (18 February) ====
- Panellists: Greg Davies, Keith Lemon and Graham Norton
- Performances:
  - Jessie J – "Domino"
  - JLS – "Do You Feel What I Feel?"

Act	Dance	Status
Laurie Brett and Tameka Empson	"Telephone" — Lady Gaga ft. Beyoncé	Saved by the public vote
Terry Alderton	"Proud Mary" — Tina Turner	Saved by the panel
Darren Gough	"Gym Mambo" — from West Side Story	Eliminated
Tony Blackburn and David Hamilton	"Push It" — Salt-n-Pepa	Eliminated by the panel
Renton Skinner and Ulrika Jonsson	"El Tango de Roxanne" — from Moulin Rouge	Eliminated

==== Heat 2 (25 February) ====
- Panellists: Rufus Hound, Vic Reeves and Iain Lee
- Performances:
  - Ed Sheeran – "Drunk"
  - Alexandra Burke – "Elephant"

Act	Dance	Status
Eddie "the Eagle" Edwards	"Soul Bossa Nova" — from Austin Powers	Saved by the public vote
Miles Jupp	"Firestarter" — The Prodigy	Saved by the panel
Alice Barry	"Outside" — George Michael	Eliminated
Ava Vidal	"Get Happy" — Judy Garland	Eliminated
Amy Childs and Harry Derbidge	"Me Against the Music" — Madonna & Britney Spears	Eliminated by the panel

==== Heat 3 (3 March) ====
- Panellists: Katy Brand, Tim Minchin and Ed Byrne
- Performances:
  - Chris Isaak – "Great Balls of Fire"
  - Tinchy Stryder feat. Pixie Lott – "Bright Lights (Good Life)"

Act	Dance	Status
Scott Mills and Olly Murs	"Party Rock Anthem" — LMFAO	Eliminated by the panel
Arabella Weir	"Can't Get You Out of My Head" — Kylie Minogue	Eliminated
Dani Harmer and Tyger Drew-Honey	"Fat Sam's Grand Slam" — from Bugsy Malone	Saved by the public vote
Kirsten O'Brien	"Jump" — Van Halen	Eliminated
Omid Djalili	"Fight the Power" — Public Enemy	Saved by the panel

- David Hasselhoff featured in Mills and Murs' performance.

==== Heat 4 (10 March) ====
- Panellists: Russell Kane, Jo Brand and Lee Nelson
- Performances:
  - Will Young – "Losing Myself"
  - LMFAO – "Sorry for Party Rocking"/"Sexy and I Know It"

Act	Dance	Status
Patrick Monahan	"Only Girl (In the World)" — Rihanna	Eliminated
Rowland Rivron	"Weapon of Choice" — Fatboy Slim	Saved by the public vote
Watson and Oliver	"Boléro" — Maurice Ravel	Eliminated
Suzi Perry & Ortis Deley	"Livin' La Vida Loca" — Ricky Martin	Eliminated by the panel
Fatima Whitbread and The Cuban Brothers	"You Should Be Dancing" — Bee Gees	Saved by the panel

- Louie Spence featured at the end of Monahan's performance.

==== Final (17 March) ====
- Panellists: Frank Skinner, Arlene Phillips and Rhod Gilbert
- Performances:
  - Katy Perry – "Part of Me"
  - JLS – "Proud"

Act	Dance	Status
Eddie "the Eagle" Edwards	"Soul Bossa Nova" — from Austin Powers	Out of running
Terry Alderton	"Proud Mary" — Tina Turner	Out of running
Fatima Whitbread and The Cuban Brothers	"You Should Be Dancing" — Bee Gees	Out of running
Omid Djalili	"Fight the Power" — Public Enemy	Out of running
Dani Harmer and Tyger Drew-Honey	"Fat Sam's Grand Slam" — from Bugsy Malone	Runners-up
Miles Jupp	"Firestarter" — The Prodigy	Out of running
Rowland Rivron	"Weapon of Choice" — Fatboy Slim	Winner
Laurie Brett and Tameka Empson	"Telephone" — Lady Gaga ft. Beyoncé	Runners-up

=== Series 5 (2013) ===
In 2013, the series reverted to three heats with six acts in the final. It ran from 16 February to 9 March.

==== Heat 1 (16 February) ====
- Panellists: Mel Giedroyc, Bradley Walsh and Tameka Empson
- Performances:
  - Kimberley Walsh — "Defying Gravity"
  - The Script — "If You Could See Me Now"

Act	Dance	Status
Soap Stars	"You Can't Stop the Beat" — from Hairspray	Saved by the panel
Olivia Lee	"Bad Romance" — Lady Gaga	Eliminated
Tim Vine	"Rock Your Body" — Justin Timberlake	Saved by the public vote
Destiny's Dad	"Bootylicious" — Destiny's Child	Eliminated
Ricky Hatton	"Let Me Entertain You" — Robbie Williams	Eliminated by the panel

- The Soap Stars consisted of Natalie Cassidy, Dean Gaffney, Claire Sweeney and Ricky Groves.
- Destiny's Dad consisted of Hal Cruttenden, Shaun Keaveny and Mark Dolan.

==== Heat 2 (23 February) ====
- Panellists: Lisa Riley, Jason Manford and Paloma Faith
- Performances:
  - Paloma Faith — "Black and Blue"
  - The cast of A Chorus Line — "One"

Act	Dance	Status
Waterloo Road	"Spice Up Your Life" — The Spice Girls	Eliminated by the panel
Jon Culshaw	"Praise You" — Fatboy Slim	Eliminated
Kim Woodburn & Rosemary Shrager	"Diamonds Are a Girl's Best Friend" — Marilyn Monroe	Eliminated
Katherine Ryan	"Starships" — Nicki Minaj	Saved by the panel
Antony Cotton	"Anything Goes" — from Anything Goes	Saved by the public vote

- Waterloo Road consisted of Victoria Bush, Tommy Knight, Carl Au, Rebecca Craven and Marlene Madenge.

==== Heat 3 (2 March) ====
- Panellists: Arlene Phillips, Greg James and Lee Mack
- Performances:
  - Nicole Scherzinger — "Boomerang"
  - Justin Bieber — "All Around the World"

Act	Dance	Status
Ore Oduba and Sonali Shah	"Hey Ya!" — OutKast	Eliminated
Jodie Prenger	"Word Up" — Cameo	Saved by the public vote
Nina Conti	"I Like to Move It" — Reel 2 Real	Eliminated
Lee Nelson	"Swan Lake Hip-Hop Remix" — Tchaikovsky	Saved by the panel
Vanessa Feltz	"If I Could Turn Back Time" — Cher	Eliminated by the panel

- Boyzone's singer Keith Duffy was meant to participate in this episode but was unable to compete due to private matters. Jodie Prenger then took his place on the show.
- Twist and Pulse featured in Lee Nelson's routine.

==== Final (9 March) ====
- Panellists: Frank Skinner, Jo Brand and Greg Davies
- Performances:
  - Taylor Swift — "22"
  - Bruno Mars — "When I Was Your Man"

Act	Dance	Status
Soap Stars	"You Can't Stop the Beat" — from Hairspray	Out of running
Tim Vine	"Rock Your Body" — Justin Timberlake	Out of running
Katherine Ryan	"Starships" — Nicki Minaj	Out of running
Jodie Prenger	"Word Up" — Cameo	Runner-up
Lee Nelson	"Swan Lake Hip-Hop Remix" — Tchaikovsky	Out of running
Antony Cotton	"Anything Goes" — from Anything Goes	Winner

=== Series 6 (2017) ===
The sixth series, renamed Let's Sing and Dance for Comic Relief, was hosted by former The Great British Bake Off presenting duo Mel Giedroyc and Sue Perkins.

The full episode line-ups were revealed on 28 February.

==== Heat 1 (4 March) ====
- Panellists: Katherine Ryan, Jo Brand & Frank Skinner
- Performances: Calum Scott ("Rhythm Inside") and Emeli Sandé ("Shakes")

Paul O'Grady was due to appear as a judge, but was forced to withdraw due to "personal reasons" and was replaced by Katherine Ryan

Act	Dance & Artist	Status
Matt Edmondson	"Super Bass" — Nicki Minaj	Eliminated by the panel
Helen Lederer & Harriet Thorpe	"Dancing Queen" — ABBA	Eliminated
Russell Grant	"Chain Reaction" — Diana Ross	Eliminated
Rickie & Melvin	"The Fresh Prince of Bel-Air" / "Men in Black" / "Boom! Shake the Room" — Will Smith	Saved by the public vote
Sara Pascoe	"Chandelier" — Sia	Saved by the panel

==== Heat 2 (11 March) ====
- Panellists: Claudia Winkleman, Adil Ray as Mr Khan and Russell Kane
- Performances: Louisa Johnson ("Best Behaviour") and Stepping Out

Act	Dance & Artist	Status
Holby & Casualty	"Uptown Funk" — Mark Ronson featuring Bruno Mars	Saved by the panel
Boys Allowed	"Biology" — Girls Aloud	Eliminated
Danny-Boy	"I'm Still Standing" — Elton John	Eliminated
The Chasers	The Wizard of Oz Medley	Saved by the public vote
Ola & James	"All About That Bass" — Meghan Trainor	Eliminated by the panel

- Boys Allowed consists of Ben Ofoedu, Duncan James, Gareth Gates, Jon Lee and Ritchie Neville.
- Cast of Casualty and Holby City consists of Amanda Henderson, Chizzy Akudolu and Tony Marshall.
- The Chasers consists of Anne Hegerty, Jenny Ryan, Mark Labbett and Shaun Wallace.

==== Heat 3 (18 March) ====
- Panellists: Miranda Hart, Jennifer Saunders, Julian Clary and Tameka Empson
- Performances: Anne-Marie ("Ciao Adios")

Act	Dance & Artist	Status
Steph & Dom	"Dead Ringer for Love" — Meat Loaf featuring Cher	Eliminated
The One Show presenters	"Born This Way" — Lady Gaga	Saved by the public
Pete Firman & Ellie Taylor	"Black Magic" — Little Mix	Eliminated
Alison Hammond	"Get Ur Freak On" — Missy Elliott	Saved by the judges
Sally Lindsay	"Cum On Feel the Noize" — Slade	Eliminated by the judges

- The One Show consists of Alex Riley, Angellica Bell, Dominic Littlewood, Iwan Thomas and Michelle Ackerley.

==== Final (25 March) ====
- Panellists: Rufus Hound, Katy Brand and Jason Manford
- Performances: Zara Larsson ("So Good") and Dua Lipa ("Be the One")

Act	Dance & Artist	Status
Rickie & Melvin	"The Fresh Prince of Bel-Air" / "Men in Black" / "Boom! Shake the Room" — Will Smith	Out of running
Holby & Casualty	"Uptown Funk" — Mark Ronson featuring Bruno Mars	Runner-up
The Chasers	The Wizard of Oz Medley	Winners
Sara Pascoe	"Chandelier" — Sia	Out of running
The One Show presenters	"Born This Way" — Lady Gaga	Out of running
Alison Hammond	"Get Ur Freak On" — Missy Elliott	Out of running

== Ratings ==
=== Series 1 ===
Episode	Date	Viewers (millions)	BBC1 weekly ranking	Share
1	21 February 2009	7.06	4	31.1%
2	21 February 2009	6.90	5	31.9%
3	7 March 2009	8.44	4	35.1%
4	14 March 2009	8.26	7	35.5%
Series average		7.67	—N/a	33.4%

=== Series 2 ===
Episode	Date	Viewers (millions)	BBC1 weekly ranking	Share
1	20 February 2010	6.47	11	26.8%
2	27 February 2010	6.77	7	26.8%
3	6 March 2010	7.20	10	30.3%
4	13 March 2010	7.27	5	31.2%
Series average		6.93	—N/a	28.8%

=== Series 3 ===
Episode	Date	Viewers (millions)	BBC1 weekly ranking	Share
1	19 February 2011	7.98	5	32.3%
2	26 February 2011	7.74	5	32.0%
3	5 March 2011	6.65	7	28.7%
4	12 March 2011	7.42	5	29.8%
Series average		7.45	—N/a	30.7%

=== Series 4 ===
Episode	Date	Viewers (millions)	BBC1 weekly ranking	Share
1	18 February 2012	6.84	7	28.9%
2	25 February 2012	5.81	12	24.7%
3	3 March 2012	5.87	7	25.3%
4	10 March 2012	5.29	10	23.5%
5	17 March 2012	5.88	8	25.8%
Series average		5.94	—N/a	25.6%

=== Series 5 ===
Episode	Date	Viewers (millions)	BBC1 weekly ranking	Share
1	16 February 2013	6.98	6	31.2%
2	23 February 2013	5.35	12	22.0%
3	2 March 2013	4.74	21	20.0%
4	9 March 2013	4.83	24	20.5%
Series average		5.48	—N/a	23.4%

=== Series 6 ===
Episode	Date	Viewers (millions)	BBC1 weekly ranking	Share
1	4 March 2017	3.74	30	17.1%
2	11 March 2017	3.39^{1}	—N/a	17.2%
3	18 March 2017	3.71	28	18.0%
4	25 March 2017	3.08^{1}	—N/a	16.7%
Series average		3.48	—N/a	17.3%

^1 Overnight figure.
