= Darragh Ennis =

Irish entomologist and quizzer

- Born: Dublin, Ireland
- Other names: The Menace, The Dublin Dynamo
- Education: Maynooth University
- Occupations: Entomologist, neuroscientist, quizzer, television personality
- Years active: 2015–present
- Employer: ITV
- Known for: The Chase

Darragh Ennis is an Irish entomologist, neuroscientist, professional quizzer, and television personality. He is a researcher at the University of Oxford and one of the "Chasers" on the ITV game show The Chase, where he is known by the alias "The Menace".

== Early life and science career ==
Ennis was born in Dublin, and grew up in Rathcoole. He studied at Maynooth University, graduating with a BSc in biology in 2003, and a PhD in ecology in 2008. After completing his doctorate, he worked as a biomedical scientist at ICON for a year before undertaking postdoctoral research at Concordia University in Montreal, Canada, from 2010 until 2012. Since 2013, he has worked as a laboratory manager and research technician in the Department of Biochemistry at the University of Oxford, where he specialises in researching the brains of insects.

On 12 May 2024, Ennis announced the pre-order of his book entitled The Body: 10 Things You Should Know via Instagram. It was released on 26 September 2024.

== Television ==
In 2015, Ennis appeared as a contestant on the game show Rebound but was eliminated in the "Stop the Bar" round.

In 2017, Ennis was a member of a winning team on The Chase. He earned £9,000 in his Cash Builder round and defeated chaser Paul Sinha to take this money into the Final Chase. The other three contestants also advanced, but each of them took low offers from Sinha so that the final prize total was £6,300, giving each contestant £1,575 when the team won in the Final Chase. Viewers set up a GoFundMe campaign to compensate Ennis for his share of the money lost through his teammates' decisions. Ennis requested for all money to be donated to charity.

In April 2020, Ennis was announced as the sixth chaser on The Chase, alongside Mark Labbett, Shaun Wallace, Anne Hegerty, Paul Sinha and Jenny Ryan. His Chaser-debut episode was aired on 19 November 2020. His debut brought in 4.9 million viewers, making it the most watched episode of The Chase ever.

== Personal life ==
Ennis lives in Oxford, England, with his wife, a fellow scientist whom he met at Maynooth University, and their two children. Ennis speaks Irish in addition to English. He supports Dublin GAA and Liverpool F.C.

== Filmography ==
Year	Title	Role	Channel
2015	Rebound	Contestant	ITV
2017	The Chase	Contestant	ITV
2020–present	The Chase	Chaser/The Menace	ITV
2021–present	Beat the Chasers	Chaser/The Menace	ITV
