= Britain's Brightest Family =

TV quiz gameshow

- Genre: Game show
- Presented by: Anne Hegerty
- Country of origin: United Kingdom
- Original language: English
- No. of seasons: 2 (regular); 2 (celebrity)
- No. of episodes: 15 (regular); 14 (celebrity)

Production
- Production location: Dock10 studios
- Running time: 30 minutes (inc. adverts)
- Production company: Gameface

Original release
- Network: ITV
- Release: 10 January 2018 – 20 May 2021

Related
- Ask the Family

Britain's Brightest Family is a British quiz show that was originally broadcast by ITV, airing from 10 January 2018 to 20 May 2021, and presented by Anne Hegerty. Its celebrity series, Britain's Brightest Celebrity Family, aired from 2020 to 2021.

== Format ==
The family – a young captain and two older relatives – answer questions on the buzzers. Unlike most other shows, this quiz is not about simple trivia; rather, it uses pictures and graphics throughout.

The show opens and closes with a team round. One player buzzes in, and nominates another member of the team to answer. To show this, the nominated player's chair rises slightly.

Buoyed by a decent reception, a second series was commissioned. There were some changes in the format and set design. Quick-fire questions on the buzzers still came first and last, but there was now only one head-to-head round, with the questions about a single random topic.

A multiple-choice round involved all six players tapping answers to the same questions. There was also a memory round. The final quick-fire round was timed, rather than lasting for five questions, and was still played for double points.

== Winners ==
=== Regular series ===
Year	Family
2018	The Curtis Family
2019	The Lee Family

=== Celebrity series ===
Year	Family
2020	The Williamson Family
2021	The Wright Family

== Transmissions ==
=== Regular series ===
Series	Start date	End date	Episodes
1	10 January 2018	25 April 2018	15
2	30 January 2019	15 May 2019	15

=== Celebrity series ===
Series	Start date	End date	Episodes
1	28 May 2020	9 July 2020	7
2	8 April 2021	20 May 2021	7
