= Andreas Pitsillides =

Cypriot theologian and politician

- Ανδρέας Πιτσιλλίδης

Member of the European Parliament
- In office 2013–2014

Personal details
- Born: 9 June 1977 (age 47); Nicosia, Cyprus
- Political party: Democratic Rally
- Profession: Theologian and politician

Andreas Pitsillides (Greek: Ανδρέας Πιτσιλλίδης; born 9 June 1977) is a Cypriot theologian, politician, party member of DISY and former Member of the European Parliament.

Since 2020, he has been a Chaser in the Cypriot version of The Chase quiz show.
