= The Chase (British game show) =

British TV quiz show (2009–present)

- Genre: Game show
- Created by: Danny Carvalho; Pete Faherty; Chris Gepp; Elliot Johnson; Matt Pritchard; Amanda Wilson
- Directed by: Ian Hamilton; Stuart McDonald; Mick Thomas; John L. Spencer
- Presented by: Bradley Walsh
- Starring: Mark Labbett; Shaun Wallace; Anne Hegerty; Paul Sinha; Jenny Ryan; Darragh Ennis
- Theme music composer: Paul Farrer
- Country of origin: United Kingdom
- Original language: English
- No. of series: 19 (Regular); 15 (Celebrity); 2 (The Family Chase)
- No. of episodes: 2,679 (Regular); 151 (Celebrity); 22 (The Family Chase); 9 (Bloopers)

Production
- Executive producers: Sue Allison; Martin Scott; Michael Kelpie; Claire Horton; Helen Tumbridge
- Production locations: Granada Studios (2009); The London Studios (2010–2013); Teddington Studios (2013–2014); Elstree Studios (2014–present); Television Centre (Celebrity Specials, 2019–present)
- Editors: Mark Goodwin; Andy Marangone
- Running time: 60 minutes (including advertisements); 45–48 minutes (excluding advertisements)
- Production companies: ITV Studios (2009–2013); Potato (2013–2026); Bright Entertainment (2026–present)

Original release
- Network: ITV
- Release: 29 June 2009 – present

Related
- Beat the Chasers; The Chase Around the World

The Chase is a British television quiz show broadcast on the ITV network and hosted by Bradley Walsh. Contestants play against a professional quizzer, known as the "Chaser", who attempts to prevent them from winning a cash prize. As of 2026, there are six chasers: Mark Labbett, Shaun Wallace, Anne Hegerty, Paul Sinha, Jenny Ryan, and Darragh Ennis. It shares similarities with the Australian quiz show The Master that first aired briefly in 2006. Labbett and Wallace have both been chasers since series 1 while Hegerty joined in series 2, Sinha in series 4, Ryan in series 9, and Ennis in series 13. With exceptions for special episodes (primarily Christmas specials and anniversary episodes), only one chaser participates in a single episode; their identity is only revealed at the moment they first participate in the game.

A team of four contestants individually attempt to amass as much money as possible which is later added to a prize fund if the contestant survives their chase. The chaser must attempt to catch each contestant during their chase, eliminating that person from the game and preventing the money from being added to the collective prize fund. In the individual chase, the player must choose between a higher offer (closer to the chaser), their earned money and a lower offer (further away from the chaser). Later, in the final round, contestants who survived their chases play collectively as a team against the chaser for an equal share of the prize fund.

With a regular audience of three to five million, The Chase is one of the most successful and longest running game shows on UK television and one of ITV's most successful daytime shows ever. The show has been nominated seven times at the National Television Awards, winning in 2016, 2017, 2019 and 2024. They also won for the spin-off series Beat the Chasers in 2021 and 2022. It was also nominated for the inaugural Best Daytime award at the 2021 British Academy Television Awards, and won it in 2022.

Additionally, The Chase has become a successful international franchise with many international versions. Among its most popular international adaptions are the Australian version, by Seven Network, and the American version, by GSN and ABC. Labbett and Hegerty feature as chasers on the Australian version (with Wallace appearing as a "Guest Chaser" in 2018). Labbett featured as the sole chaser on the 2013–2015 American version and joined the 2021 American version for its second season, leaving again in 2022.

== Gameplay ==
=== Cash Builder and Head-to-Head rounds ===
Screenshot from the ITV version illustrating how a head-to-head chase appears on-screen. The contestant has selected the £9000 offer and must give five correct answers without being caught in order to bank the money. At this point, the contestant and Chaser have both given one correct answer, with the latter represented by the red arrow.

Each contestant individually attempts to accumulate money for the team's prize fund through two rounds. In the first round, known as the "Cash Builder", the contestant answers as many questions as they can within 60 seconds. Each correct answer awards £1000. There is no penalty for incorrect answers or passes. After completing the Cash Builder, the contestant enters the "Head-to-Head" round, attempting to move the money down to the bottom of a seven-step board and into the team's prize fund ("home") without being caught by the Chaser.

The contestant is given three options by the Chaser at the start of the Head-to-Head round: play for the money earned in the Cash Builder and start three steps down the board (requiring five correct answers to reach home), accept a higher offer and start two steps down, or accept a lower offer and start four steps down. The lower offer can be zero or even a negative amount if the team has already banked some money. Once the starting position is selected, the host asks a series of multiple-choice questions to the contestant and the Chaser, both of whom individually select one of the three answer options on keypads. After either person locks in a guess, the other must do so within five seconds or else be frozen out for that turn. A correct answer moves the person who gave it one step down the board, while a miss or freeze-out leaves them where they are.

If the contestant reaches the bottom of the board while still ahead of the Chaser, they advance to the Final Chase and their money is added to the team's prize fund (or deducted, if they took a negative amount). If the Chaser overtakes the contestant, they are eliminated from the game and the money is forfeited. If all four contestants are caught by the Chaser, they nominate one contestant to play the Final Chase alone.

Contestants who are blind or visually impaired, or who are deaf or hearing impaired, are allowed to have a helper present who can assist in conveying information to them as needed. The helper may not suggest answers or take any other active role in the game. Contestants who are unable to stand for an extended period may use a chair as needed during the game.

=== The Final Chase ===
The contestants who have won their head-to-head chases blindly select one of two question sets for themselves, with the other set put aside for the Chaser, and then have two minutes to answer as many questions as possible on the buzzer. Any answer given by a contestant who has not buzzed-in is automatically ruled wrong; if only one contestant is participating in this round, the buzzer is not used. Every correct answer moves the team one step ahead of the Chaser, and they are given a head start of one step per contestant participating in this round. The contestants may not discuss or confer on any questions during this portion of the round and may pass as often as desired. There is no time limit on individual questions; the host will only ask a new question after someone has either answered or passed on the current one.

The Chaser is then given 2 minutes to answer questions from the unused set in an attempt to catch the team, moving one step forward per correct answer. If the Chaser passes or misses a question, the clock stops and the team is given a chance to discuss it and respond; a correct answer pushes the Chaser back one step or (from series 3 onwards) moves the team ahead one step if the Chaser is at the starting line. If the Chaser catches the team before the time expires, the prize fund is forfeited and the contestants receive nothing. During celebrity editions, a consolation £1000 is donated to each celebrity's chosen charity in this case. If the Chaser is unable to catch up to the team, the participating contestants split the prize fund equally. If all four contestants are caught in their head-to-head chases and the one they nominate wins the Final Chase, each contestant wins £1000 (£2000 in celebrity specials).

== Production ==
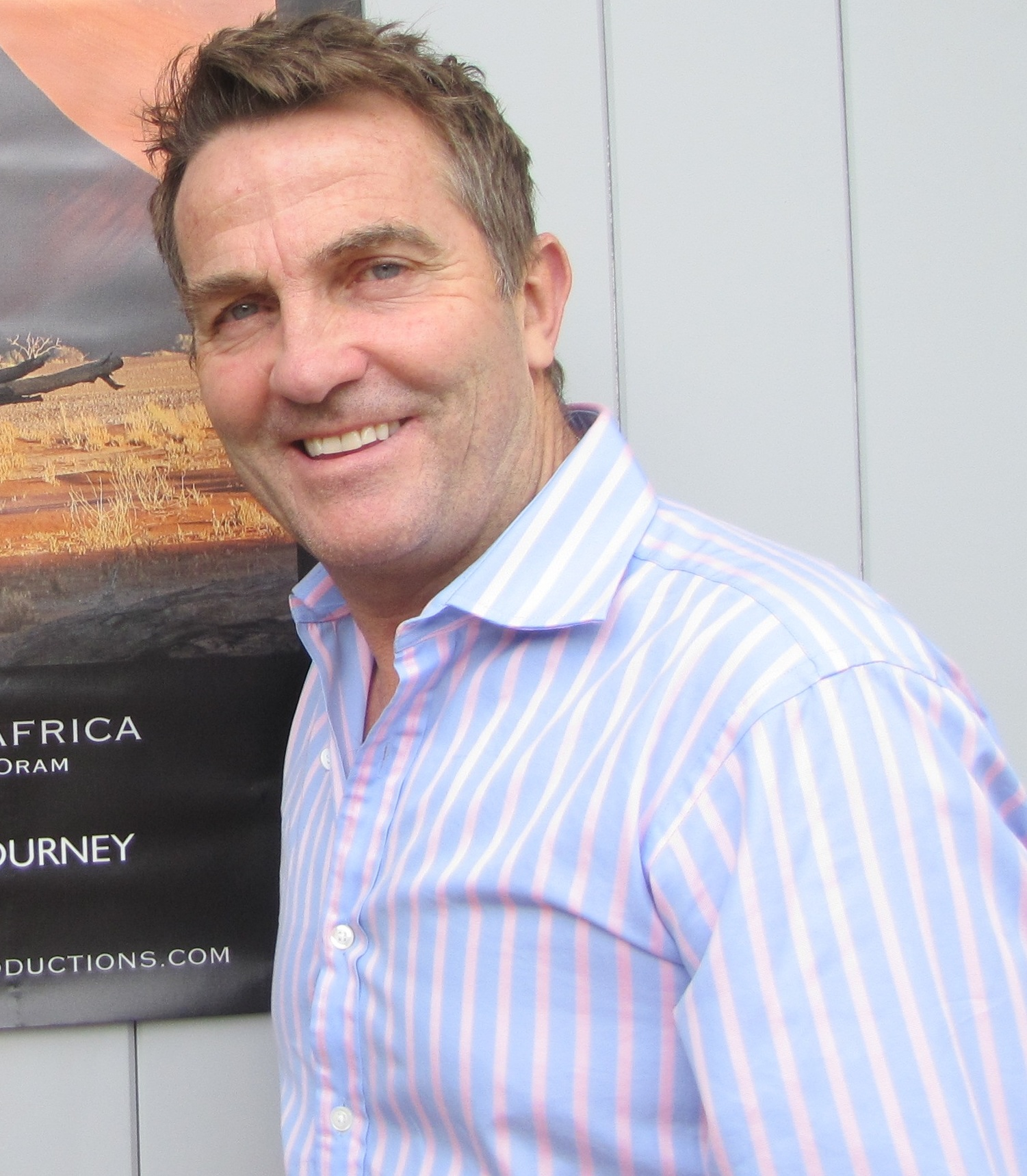
Bradley Walsh, presenter of the show

Three episodes are filmed in a day, each one taking around an hour and a half to film. According to Walsh, "It runs like clockwork." The Final Chase can be stopped and re-started if Walsh stumbles on a question. He told the Radio Times, "If there is a slight misread, I am stopped immediately – bang – by the lawyers. We have the compliance lawyers in the studio all the time. What you have to do is go back to the start of the question, literally on videotape where my mouth opens – or where it's closed from the previous question – and the question is re-asked. It is stopped to the split second."

Between March 2020 and late June 2020, production of the series was suspended due to the COVID-19 pandemic; the series was already on a previously scheduled production hiatus at the time of the suspension. In an interview with The Sun's TV Mag, Walsh said that the show was "at least 100 episodes behind schedule" due to lockdown; during the production hiatus, repeats were shown in the programme's regular timeslot.

== Chasers ==
=== Main ===
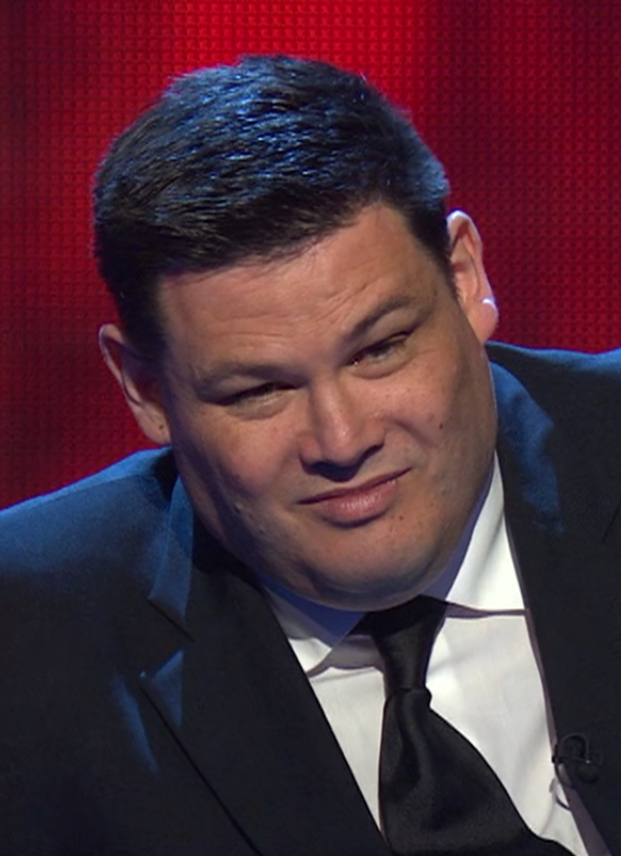
Mark Labbett was the first out of two chasers and joined the show in its first series.

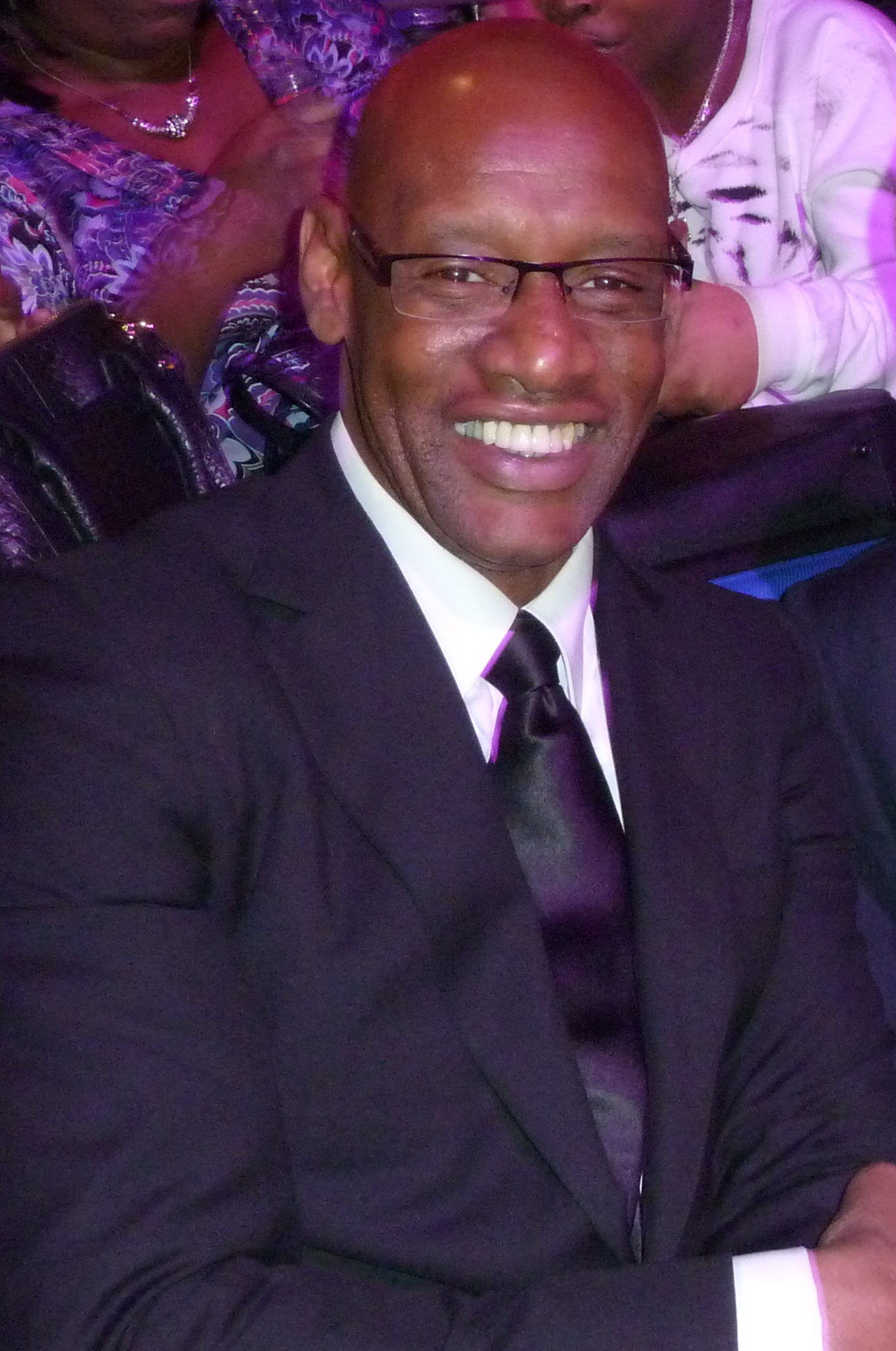
Shaun Wallace was the second out of two chasers and joined the show in its first series.

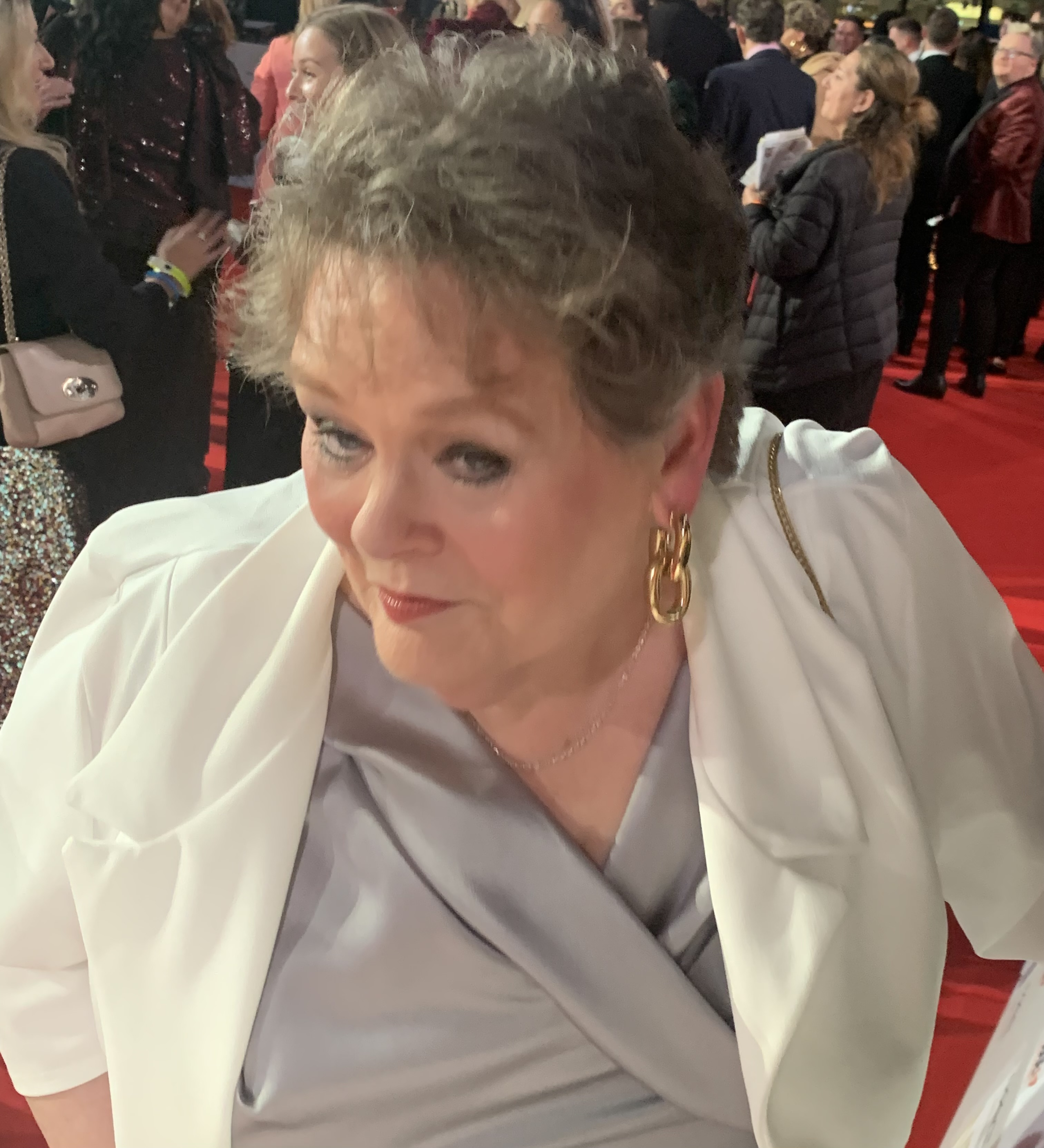
Anne Hegerty is the third chaser to join the show, in its second series.

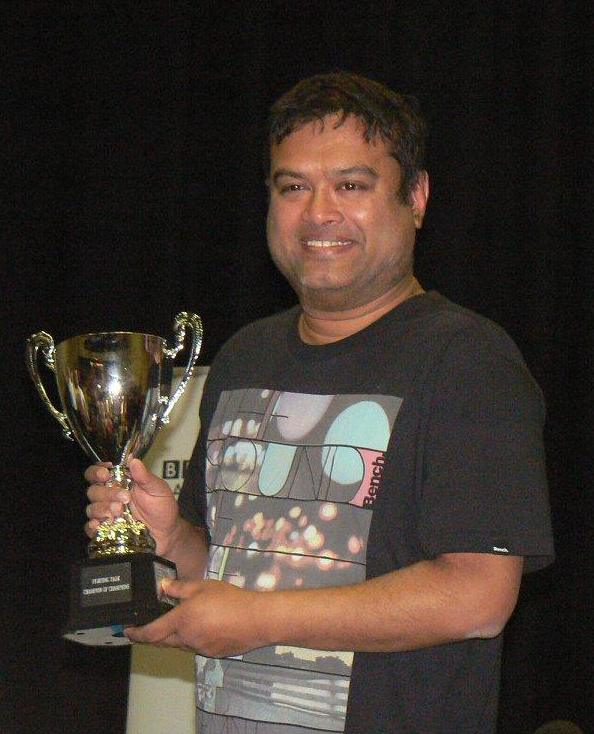
Paul Sinha is the fourth chaser to join the show, in its fourth series.

- Mark Labbett (2009–present). Known as "The Beast", appeared on University Challenge, Fifteen to One, The Syndicate and Who Wants to be a Millionaire?; runner-up on The People's Quiz, runner-up on Brain of Britain, and part of a winning team on Only Connect. He was also the sole chaser on the first three seasons of the first American version of the show on GSN and was one of six on the Australian version of the show. On 6 June 2021, Labbett returned as the fourth chaser on the second American adaptation of the show in 2021.
- Shaun Wallace (2009–present). Known as "The Dark Destroyer", appeared on Fifteen to One, Weakest Link, Beat the Nation, BrainTeaser, Greed and The Waiting Game; winner of Mastermind and a finalist on the first series of Are You an Egghead?. Wallace appeared as a guest chaser on the Australian version of the show in 2018.
- Anne Hegerty (2010–present). Known as "The Governess", appeared twice on Mastermind, Fifteen to One, Today's the Day, Brain of Britain and Are You an Egghead?. Hegerty is also a chaser on the Australian and New Zealand versions of the show.
- Paul Sinha (2011–present). Known as "The Sinnerman", appeared on Are You an Egghead?, Brain of Britain, Mastermind, University Challenge and Weakest Link. He is also a stand-up comedian, with a comedy series called Paul Sinha's General Knowledge broadcast on BBC Radio 4.
- Jenny Ryan (2015–present). Known as "The Vixen", appeared on Mastermind, Are You an Egghead?, Fifteen to One and The Weakest Link; part of a team that reached the semi-finals of University Challenge and was part of a winning team on Only Connect.
- Darragh Ennis (2020–present). Known as "The Menace", appeared on Rebound and part of a winning team against Paul Sinha on The Chase in 2017. Ennis is a postdoctoral researcher at Oxford University studying insects.

=== Guest ===
- Issa Schultz (2022). Known as "The Supernerd", 11-time winner of the Australian Quizzing Championships and seven-time pairs champion. Appeared on Australian game shows The Rich List, Who Wants to be a Millionaire? and The Einstein Factor as well as being a Chaser on the Australian and New Zealand versions of the show. He appeared in the fifth series of the original UK Beat the Chasers as a substitute for Anne Hegerty after she tested positive for COVID-19.
- Vikkstar123 (2024). Known as “The 123”, appeared as a one-off guest Chaser in a special edition episode of the Chase where they collaborated with Vik’s YouTube group the Sidemen.
- Joe Pasquale (2025). Known as "Maverick", appeared as a one-off guest Chaser in the final episode of the seventh series of Beat the Chasers as a substitute for Darragh Ennis. Maverick's identity was kept a secret until the very end of the aforementioned episode when he revealed himself to be the well known television presenter, actor and comedian.

== Spin-offs ==
=== The Chase: Celebrity Special ===
A spin-off series titled The Chase: Celebrity Special featuring celebrity teams as contestants began airing on ITV in 2011. As many contestants are comedians or actors, there is a much-higher comedic element. The game is played the same way as the regular version. However, if all four celebrities have been caught by the Chaser, the prize fund during the Final Chase is £8,000 (originally £20,000). If the team is caught during the Final Chase, a consolation prize of £1,000 is awarded to the charities for each celebrity who advanced to this stage.

For celebrity specials airing at Christmas, the Chasers frequently appear in costumes adhering to a common theme, such as Panto villains, subjects of famous paintings, or characters typically associated with Christmas.

=== The Family Chase ===
In February 2017, ITV commissioned The Family Chase, a spin-off featuring a team of four family members. The six-episode spin-off debuted on 2 September 2017. Series 2 was commissioned by ITV. This series aired from 24 March 2019 until 24 May 2020.

No further series of the spin-off have been commissioned by ITV, though it has not yet been cancelled.

This version follows the same rules as the parent programme, but any winnings in the Final Chase are awarded to the entire family rather than individual members.

=== The Chase: The Bloopers ===
In December 2017, a special episode of the show was broadcast entitled The Chase: The Bloopers, featuring (mostly) unseen mistakes, outtakes and gags from the previous 8 years of the show. This has gone on to become an annual comedic bloopers show where Walsh and the Chasers introduce various clips from the show. As of 21 December 2025, 9 Bloopers shows have been broadcast.

=== Beat the Chasers ===
In November 2019, ITV commissioned another spin-off called Beat the Chasers. It began airing in prime-time on 27 April 2020 and features contestants attempting to beat up to five Chasers to win big cash prizes. The Chasers that featured in the show were Sinha, Labbett, Ryan, Hegerty and Wallace.

=== The Chase Extra ===
In this special isolation version of the show, broadcast on The Chase's YouTube channel and shown straight after the main show, all five Chasers are presenters and viewers at home can play along, for they are the contestants. Each series has five episodes; the first series was shown in mid-May 2020, and was hosted by Jenny Ryan. Between late-May and early-June, the second series was shown across consecutive days and presented by Shaun Wallace. On 1 March 2021, it was announced that a new series would be available on ITVX for six episodes, every Monday at 6:00 pm.

=== The Chasers' Road Trip: Trains, Brains and Automobiles ===
In November 2020, ITV announced another spin-off in which The Beast, The Dark Destroyer and The Governess go on a road trip around the world. On their travels, they play against child geniuses, great apes, dolphins and robots. The series takes them to the UK, the US and Japan. Episode 1 of the show aired on 21 January 2021, episode 2 aired on 28 January 2021 and episode 3 aired on 4 February 2021. The series was narrated by Rob Brydon.

=== The Chase: Sidemen Edition ===
On 11 February 2024, the popular British YouTube group the Sidemen posted a comedic spin-off episode of The Chase on their group channel, with clips also shared on The Chase's official YouTube channel. The video was filmed on the show's set, and also used the on-set cameras and crew whilst using the graphics and music from the TV programme. It also features a guest appearance from Bradley Walsh during a surprise interlude.

Fellow YouTuber Stephen "Stephen Tries" Lawson hosted, while Sidemen members were the Chaser and contestants: Vikram "Vikkstar123" Barn was the Chaser (nicknamed "The 123"), while the contestants competing in pairs were Olajide "KSI" Olatunji, Simon "Miniminter" Minter, Joshua "Zerkaa" Bradley, Tobi "TBJZL" Brown, Ethan "Behzinga" Payne and Harry "Wroetoshaw" Lewis.

=== The Chase Around the World ===
In January 2026, ITV announced they had commissioned a new prime-time spin-off series entitled The Chase Around the World. The series features 6 contestants who attempt to find the Chasers across various locations around the globe. It is the first project produced under ITV Studios label Bright Entertainment, and commenced broadcasting on 16 July 2026 with the final episode airing on 20 August 2026. In September 2026, it was reported that the spin-off series would be axed; however, ITV has confirmed that discussions were still ongoing.

== Transmissions ==
=== Regular ===
Series	Start date	End date	Recorded	Episodes	Notes
1	29 June 2009	10 July 2009	2009	10	Debuted as one of the three summer replacements for Golden Balls, the other two being Divided and The Fuse. The only series in which the game board had 8 steps instead of 7.
2	24 May 2010	19 July 2010	2010	40	First series to feature Anne Hegerty as a chaser. First series to feature the ‘Who’s the chaser?’ segment. From this series onwards, the chaser’s identity is only revealed upon them walking across the bridge for the first time. First series to feature the 7-step game board.
3	3 January 2011	25 February 2011	2010	40	Last full series to feature 3 chasers. First series to feature updated graphics- the cash builder amounts and head to head offers as well as the on-screen step counter in the final chase have all been updated. First series to feature the push-forward rule during the final chase.
4	5 September 2011	30 January 2012	2011	60	First series to feature Paul Sinha as a chaser.
5	31 January 2012	30 March 2013	2011-2012	120 (1 unaired)	Episode 120 remains unaired for unknown reasons.
6	29 October 2012	21 November 2014	2012	155 (6 unaired)	Episodes 41, 139, 148 and 149 were not aired due to problems with one of the questions including questions about Gary Glitter, Dave Lee Travis and R. Kelly for example. Episode 9 was not aired due to a question about Jimmy Savile, but was replaced with another episode. Episode 112 was not aired due to a question about Rolf Harris. Episode 121 was not aired due to the presence of a topical question.
7	2 September 2013	17 November 2014	2013	150	Last series to feature the polka dot background.
8	1 September 2014	3 July 2015	2014	146 (4 unaired)	Last full series to feature 4 chasers. First series to feature the plain background.
9	22 June 2015	6 September 2016	2015	190	First series to feature Jenny Ryan as a chaser.
10	15 April 2016	24 October 2017	2016	190	Episode 166 of this series features Darragh Ennis as a contestant who became a chaser in Series 13. First series to feature the red clock during pushback opportunities.
11	25 April 2017	3 September 2018	2016-2017	170	
12	2 March 2018	21 September 2020	2017-2018	170	Last full series to feature 5 chasers.
13	7 March 2019	4 October 2022	2018-2019	210 (1 unaired)	First series to feature Darragh Ennis as a chaser. Episodes 175-182 label him the ‘mystery chaser’ during the ‘Who’s the chaser?’ segment, with his first appearance being in episode 183. Episode 169 of this series remains unaired for legal reasons.
14	4 November 2020	30 December 2022	2020-2021	210	The first 43 episodes of this series were recorded pre-pandemic in early 2020. The rest of the series was recorded on the socially-distanced set.
15	27 January 2022	5 February 2024	2021-2023	210	
16	19 April 2023	26 February 2026	2023-2024	160 (1 unaired)	Episode 75 of this series remains unaired for unknown reasons.
17	8 March 2024	TBD	2024-2025	160	
18	28 February 2025	TBD	2025	140	
19	TBD	TBD	2026	140	

=== Celebrity Special ===
Series	Start date	End date	Recorded	Episodes	Notes
1	29 October 2011	10 December 2011	2011	6	
2	19 August 2012	7 October 2012	2012	6	
3	5 October 2013	28 December 2013	2013	14	
4	30 August 2014	8 March 2015	2014	18	Episode 18 of this series was a Christmas special. First series to feature chasers in their special outfits.
5	24 October 2015	15 May 2016	2015	16	
6	11 September 2016	26 November 2017	2016	16	First series to feature Jenny Ryan as a chaser.
7	14 October 2017	21 October 2018	2017	8	
8	14 October 2018	12 September 2020	2018	8 (1 unaired)	Episode 4 of this series was a Christmas special.
9	8 June 2018	12 October 2019	2018	8	Episode 1 of this series was a Soccer Aid special.
10	14 June 2019	6 November 2021	2019	12	Episode 1 of this series was a Soccer Aid special. Episodes 9 and 10 of this series were Christmas specials.
11	17 October 2020	15 January 2023	2020-2021	12	Episodes 5 and 6 of this series were Christmas specials.
12	3 September 2021	21 May 2023	2021	12	First series to feature Darragh Ennis as a chaser. Episode 1 of this series was a Soccer Aid special. Episodes 6 and 7 of this series were Christmas specials.
13	25 December 2022	30 November 2024	2022	12	Episodes 1 and 2 of this series were Christmas specials.
14	22 December 2024	25 December 2024	2024	2	This series only featured Christmas specials.
15	24 December 2025	TBD	2025	TBC	

=== The Family Chase ===
Series	Start date	End date	Recorded	Episodes	Notes
1	2 September 2017	14 October 2017	2017	6	
2	24 March 2019	24 May 2020	2018	16	

=== The Chase: The Bloopers editions ===
Bloopers Year	Airdate	Recorded	Notes
2017	17 December 2017	2017	
2018	23 December 2018	2018	
2019	24 December 2019	2019	
2020	27 December 2020	2020	
2021	2 January 2022	2021	
2022	8 January 2023	2022	
2023	24 March 2024	2023	
2024	7 December 2024	2024	This was a spoof of Fantastic Beasts and Where to Find Them, with Bradley and the Chasers reading from ‘The Fantastical Book of Cock-Ups and Where to Find Them’.
2025	21 December 2025	2025	

=== EXTRA editions ===
Series	Start date	End date	Episodes	Notes
1	18 May 2020	22 May 2020	5	
2	26 May 2020	14 June 2020	5	
3	8 March 2021	12 April 2021	6	
4	6 September 2021	11 October 2021	6	
5	25 December 2021	31 January 2022	6	
6	25 July 2022	29 August 2022	6	
7	21 November 2022	26 December 2022	6	

=== The Chasers Road Trip: Trains, Brains and Automobiles editions ===
Series	Start date	End date	Episodes
1	21 January 2021	4 February 2021	3

=== Episodes beyond series count ===
Airdate	Title	Recorded
20 December 2013	Text Santa 2013	2013
24 December 2017	A Christmas Chase	2017
29 May 2026	Soccer Aid 2026	2026

== Reception ==
=== Critical reception ===
The Chase is highly popular with critics and viewers. Despite early criticism, opinion has improved over time. Some critics, as well as the chasers, put the show's success down to Walsh as host and his many memorable moments, some of which come from questions or answers which often leave him in fits of highly contagious hysterics. Labbett also said that the sense of fun and the variety of chasers is a major factor. Sinha said, "The format has been brilliantly thought out. No matter the relative strengths of the players, it is resolutely a team game, with a dramatic climax."

In October 2011, a clip of Walsh laughing uncontrollably at the name of German skier Fanny Chmelar went viral. By July 2013, the clip had been viewed 6 million times. According to Sinha, this clip helped double the show's audience and make it the highest-rated daytime programme. In January 2024, Walsh met Chmelar on Michael McIntyre's Big Show and apologised for laughing at her name.

The British series was viewed by an average audience of 313,800 in New Zealand in 2021. According to Massey University honorary research fellow Brian McDonnell, New Zealanders watch the show for Walsh and to support the underdog contestants, despite some questions being centred on British culture.

=== Controversies ===
The Chase has also been criticised on several occasions, such as the Final Chase, when it is alleged that Walsh asks the chasers' questions more quickly than those of the contestants. In an interview with the Radio Times, Walsh repudiated those claims: "We have lawyers on the floor to watch all of this. I read [the questions] at the same speed for both." He went on to say, "Don't forget, if I've got Mark Labbett answering questions for two minutes and I've got a team answering for two minutes, the team aren't going to be quicker. Simple as that, because they have to press the button [before answering], which is why they get a head start based on how many people are in the final. If you've got three people in the final chase that's a three-step head start–that's about a twelve-second advantage."

There have also been a number of games where the chaser has won with an answer right on the final buzzer, which some viewers have perceived to be out of time; spokespeople have asserted that an independent adjudicator – a representative from Beyond Dispute Ltd – always checks each show and makes the final call on whether answers were in or out of time.

On 6 April 2016, on an episode where Labbett was the chaser, a glitch occurred whereby the clock froze at 10 seconds and then increased to 11 seconds, giving Labbett an extra second. Although the contestants were far ahead and there was no chance of them being caught (and would win a £27,000 pot), a spokesperson for the show told OK! Online the following day that an error occurred during the editing process, but gameplay was otherwise not affected by it.

On 4 March 2019, an episode was broadcast where Walsh asked a question about which band had the fewest members, with the possible answers being the Proclaimers, the Pretenders or the Prodigy. Many viewers criticised ITV for deciding to air the episode hours after it was announced that Prodigy frontman Keith Flint had died by suicide.

On 26 January 2022, Labbett lost the final chase and, after briefly congratulating the winners, stormed off the set punching the wall on his way out. This left Walsh to apologise to the audience, though in a rather sarcastic tone, stating "I apologise to all the kids watching, that's not how you should take defeat." Labbett subsequently apologised for his behaviour via Twitter, as well as revealing that his mental health at the time of recording the particular episode was not very good, consequently affecting his behaviour. His fans online supported him through this, one of which was fellow Chaser, Paul Sinha. Sinha commented, "You should never have to apologise for the crime of “being human”. I'd have been nowhere on those questions."

=== Ratings ===
During its first two series, the show averaged 1–2 million viewers, then more than 2 million during series three. By December 2012, The Chase had become ITV's most popular "teatime" programme since The Paul O'Grady Show in 2005, with more than 3 million viewers an episode. In January 2021, The Chase managed a peak audience of more than 5 million, an all-time high. Almost every episode is now seen by between 4 and 5 million viewers, and regularly features on ITV's Top 15 weekly broadcasts.

=== Rivalry with Pointless ===
In its timeslot, The Chase airs at the same time as BBC One's Pointless, a game show launched in August 2009, two months after The Chase's debut. The two programmes usually receive similar ratings (for example in September 2012, The Chase had 2.44 million viewers versus 2.27 million for Pointless). However, between October 2012 and January 2013, The Chase beat Pointless in the ratings each week. For two weeks in February 2013, Pointless received a higher share than The Chase (3.53 million viewers to 3.41 million, and again 3.58 million viewers to 3.30 million).

== Awards ==
Year	Group	Award	Result	Reference
2013	National Television Awards	Best Daytime Programme	Nominated	
2013	Broadcast Awards	Best Daytime Programme	Won	
2013	TV Guide Awards	Best Daytime Programme	Nominated	
2014	National Television Awards	Best Daytime Programme	Nominated	
2015	National Television Awards	Best Daytime Programme	Nominated	
2015	Broadcast Awards	Best Daytime Programme	Nominated	
2016	Broadcast Awards	Best Daytime Programme	Nominated	
2016	National Television Awards	Best Daytime Programme	Won	
2017	National Television Awards	Best Daytime Programme	Won	
2017	TV Choice Awards	Best Daytime Programme	Nominated	
2018	National Television Awards	Best Daytime Programme	Nominated	
2018	TV Choice Awards	Best Daytime Programme	Nominated	
2019	National Television Awards	Best Quiz Show	Won	
2019	TV Choice Awards	Best Daytime Programme	Nominated	
2020	National Television Awards	The Bruce Forsyth Entertainment Award	Nominated	
2020	TV Choice Awards	Best Daytime Programme	Nominated	
2020	Broadcast Awards	Best Daytime Programme	Nominated	
2021	Broadcast Awards	Best Daytime Programme	Nominated	
2021	National Television Awards	Best Quiz Gameshow	Won	
2021	National Television Awards	Best Daytime	Nominated	
2021	TV Choice Awards	Best Daytime	Nominated	
2021	TRIC Awards	Best Daytime	Nominated	
2021	British Academy Television Awards	Best Daytime	Nominated	
2022	British Academy Television Awards	Best Daytime	Won	
2022	National Television Awards	Best Quiz Gameshow	Won	
2022	National Television Awards	Best Daytime	Nominated	
2022	TRIC Awards	Best Game Show	Won	
2022	TV Choice Awards	Best Daytime Show	Won	
2023	Broadcast Awards	Best Daytime Programme	Nominated	
2023	TRIC Awards	Best Game Show	Won	
2023	National Television Awards	Best Quiz Gameshow	Nominated	
2023	National Television Awards	Best Daytime	Nominated	
2024	TV Choice Awards	Best Game Show	Won	
2024	TRIC Awards	Best Game Show	Won	
2024	National Reality Television Awards	Best Game Show	Won	
2024	National Television Awards	Best Quiz Game Show	Nominated	
2024	National Television Awards	Best Daytime	Won	
2025	National Television Awards	Best Quiz Show	Nominated	

== International versions ==
This table lists all international variants in the television game show franchise The Chase that have been broadcast since the debut of the original British version of the show on 29 June 2009.

Legend: Currently airing Reinstated and currently airing No longer airing Upcoming

Country	Local title	Channel(s)	Presenter(s)	Chaser(s)	Cash Builder question value	Premiere date	End date
Australia	The Chase Australia	Seven Network	Andrew O'Keefe (2015–2021); Larry Emdur (2021–)	Brydon Coverdale; Anne Hegerty; Mark Labbett (2016–); Matt Parkinson; Issa Schultz; Shaun Wallace (Guest Chaser; 2018); Cheryl Toh (Guest Chaser; 2019–2021, Regular; 2021–); Mara Lejins (Guest Chaser; 2022–2023; Regular; 2023–)	AU$2,000	14 September 2015	
Bulgaria	Голямото преследване Golyamoto presledvane (The Great Chase)	Nova	Niki Kanchev	Miglena Draganova; Lyubomir Bratoev; Plamen Mladenov; Martin Ivanov; Radostina Tsvetanova (2023)	500 лв.	5 September 2022	2 May 2023
China	挑战文化名人; Tiǎozhǎn wénhuà míngrén (Challenge the Culture Masters)	Jiangxi Television	Liú Wèi	Meng Man; Ji Lianhai; A Yi; Kang Zhen; Li Bo	¥1,000	20 July 2014	4 October 2014
Croatia	Potjera (The Chase)	HRT 1	Tarik Filipović (2013–2019); Joško Lokas (2019–)	Dean Kotiga (2013–); Mirko Miočić (2013–2016); Morana Zibar (2013–); Krešimir Sučević-Međeral (2016–); Mladen Vukorepa (2017–)	5,000 kn (2013–2014); 3,500 kn (2014–2022) €500 (2023–)	3 November 2013	
Cyprus	Το Kυνηγητό; To Kynigitó (The Chase)	Alpha TV Cyprus	Tasos Tryfonos	Sylia Ioannidou; Andreas Pitsillides; Marinos Kleanthous; George Pamporidis (Guest Chaser; 2020); Louis Patsalidis (Guest Chaser; 2020); Christiana Aristotelous (Guest Chaser; 2020); Katerina Mina (Guest Chaser; 2021)	€200	13 September 2020	30 June 2023
Czech Republic	Na Lovu (On The Hunt)	TV Nova	Ondřej Sokol	Dagmar Jandová; Jakub Kvášovský; Jiří Martínek; Václav Slabyhoudek; Viktorie Mertová (2022–); Libor Šimůnek (2024–); Libor Bouček (2025–)	5,000 Kč	16 August 2021	
Finland	Jahti (The Chase)	MTV3	Mikko Leppilampi	Eero Ylitalo; Magnus Mali; Markus Leikola	€500	30 August 2018	16 July 2020
Germany	Gefragt – Gejagt (Asked – Chased)	NDR Fernsehen (2012–2015); Das Erste (2015–)	Alexander Bommes	Holger Waldenberger (2012, 2015–2017); Sebastian Jacoby (2013–); Sebastian Klussmann (2013–); Klaus Otto Nagorsnik (2014–2024); Grażyna Werner (2017); Manuel Hobiger (2018–); Thomas J. Kinne (2018–2023); Adriane Rickel (2021–); Annegret Schenkel (2022–)	€200 (NDR Fernsehen) €500 (Das Erste)	8 July 2012	
Greece	The Chase	Mega Channel	Maria Bekatorou	Vassilis Fasias (2021–); Panos Dimakis (2021–); Elias Alexiou (2021–); Maria Markou (2021–); Nikolas Pachis (2023–)	€250 (2021–2022) €300 (2022–)	27 December 2021	
Israel	המרדף; HaMirdaf (The Chase)	KAN 11	Ido Rosenblum (2017–2021, 2022–2023); Lucy Ayoub (2021–2022); Hila Korach (2023–)	Itai Hermann (2017–); Ron Kofman (Guest Chaser; 2017 and 2018); Nadav Jacobi (Guest Chaser; 2018); Michal Sharon (2018–)	₪5,000	18 May 2017	
Israel	המרדף עד הבית; HaMirdaf ad HaBait (The Chase To Home)	KAN 11	Dudu Erez	Itai Hermann		26 March 2020	7 April 2020
New Zealand	The Chase New Zealand	TVNZ	Paul Henry	Anne Hegerty; Issa Schultz	NZ$2,000	3 November 2025	24 November 2025
Norway	Jaget (Hunted)	TV 2	Sturla Berg-Johansen	Trine Aalborg; Jan Arild Breistein; Thomas Kolåsæter (2015–2016)	10,000 Kr	7 September 2014	11 May 2016
Russia	Погоня; Pogoniya (Pursuit)	Russia-1	Alexander Gurevich	Alexander Ediger; Yuriy Hashimov; Olga Uspanova; Boris Burda	₽5,000	17 November 2012	14 September 2013
Serbia	Потера; Potera (The Chase)	RTS1	Jovan Memedović; Slobodan Šarenac (Series 14)	Milorad Milinković (Series 1–12); Uroš Đurić (Series 1–5); Slobodan Nešović (Series 1); Maja Lalić (Series 1); Milica Jokanović (Series 2–); Žarko Stevanović (Series 5–); Milan Bukvić (Series 9–); Dušan Macura (Series 13–); Aleksa Stefanović (Series 14-)	10,000 din. (Series 1–9); 15,000 din. (Series 10–)	28 October 2013	
Slovakia	Na Love (On the Hunt)	Markíza; VOYO.sk (6 June 2022)	Viktor Vincze	Slavo Hlásny; Stefan Jurca; Denisa Žitňanská	€250	13 June 2022	8 July 2022
Slovenia	Na Lovu (On the Hunt)	POP TV	Peter Poles	Ivan Trajkovič; Janko Stankić; Viktor Zelj	€500	24 November 2025	
Spain	El cazador (The Hunter)	La 1 (2020–2025); La 2 (2025–2026)	Ion Aramendi (2020–2022); Rodrigo Vázquez (2022–2026)	Erundino Alonso; Paz Herrera; Ruth de Andrés; Lilit Manukyan; David Leo García (2021–2023); Orestes Barbero (2023–2026)	€1,000	10 February 2020	6 January 2026
Turkey	Takip (Follow)	Kanal D	Uraz Kaygilaroğlu	Muhsin Divan	₺5,000	9 April 2014	19 January 2015
United States	The Chase	GSN (2013–2015); ABC (2021–2023)	Brooke Burns (2013–2015); Sara Haines (2021–2023)	Mark Labbett (2013–2015, 2021–2022); Brad Rutter (2021–2023); Ken Jennings (2021–2022); James Holzhauer (2021–2023); Victoria Groce (2022–2023); Brandon Blackwell (2022–2023); Buzzy Cohen (2022–2023)	US$5,000 (GSN); US$25,000 (ABC season 1); US$10,000 (ABC seasons 2–3)	6 August 2013	20 July 2023

=== The Chase Celebrity Special international versions ===
Legend: Currently airing No longer airing Upcoming

Country	Local title	Channel(s)	Presenter(s)	Chaser(s)	Cash Builder question value	Premiere date	End date
Australia	The Chase Australia Celebrity Specials	7plus	Andrew O'Keefe	Brydon Coverdale; Anne Hegerty; Mark Labbett; Matt Parkinson; Issa Schultz	AU$2,000	21 August 2018	23 September 2019
Czech Republic	Na lovu: Hvězdný speciál	TV Nova	Ondřej Sokol	Dagmar Jandová; Jakub Kvášovský; Jiří Martínek; Václav Slabyhoudek; Viktorie Mertová	10,000 Kč	5 February 2022	
Spain	El cazador	La 1 (2020–2025); La 2 (2025)	Ion Aramendi (2020–2022); Rodrigo Vazquez (2022–2023)	Erundino Alonso; Paz Herrera; Ruth de Andrés; Lilit Manukyan; David Leo García (2021–2023)	€1,000	20 July 2020	17 July 2023
Spain	El cazador Stars	La 1 (2020–2025); La 2 (2025)	Rodrigo Vázquez (April–May 2024); Gorka Rodríguez (May 2024 – 2025)	Erundino Alonso; Paz Herrera; Ruth de Andrés; Lilit Manukyan; Orestes Barbero	€200	11 April 2024	10 November 2025

== Merchandise ==
A board game based on the show was released in 2012 by Ideal. In 2013, a card game based on the show was released by Ginger Fox.

=== Video game adaptation ===
On 12 December 2012, a version for iOS was released by Barnstorm Games. The app features four chasers (excluding Jenny "The Vixen" Ryan and Darragh "The Menace" Ennis, both of whom had not yet appeared on the programme at the time of release) and can be played by up to four people, as in the actual show. The only differences between the app and the show are that four choices are presented for questions in the Cash Builder and the Final Chase rounds and that no Final Chase is played if all four players are caught in their head-to-head chases. The app is designed for both iPhones and iPads. An updated version, The Chase: Ultimate Edition, was released in 2017 and features five chasers (excluding Ennis) and host Walsh. In 2020, the app was updated now to feature Ennis. In 2023, a free app entitled The Chase: World Tour was launched and features chasers from the British, American and Australian versions of the show. In 2025, the app was updated to include five chasers from the Croatian version of the show, Potjera.
