= Shaun Wallace =

British television personality and barrister

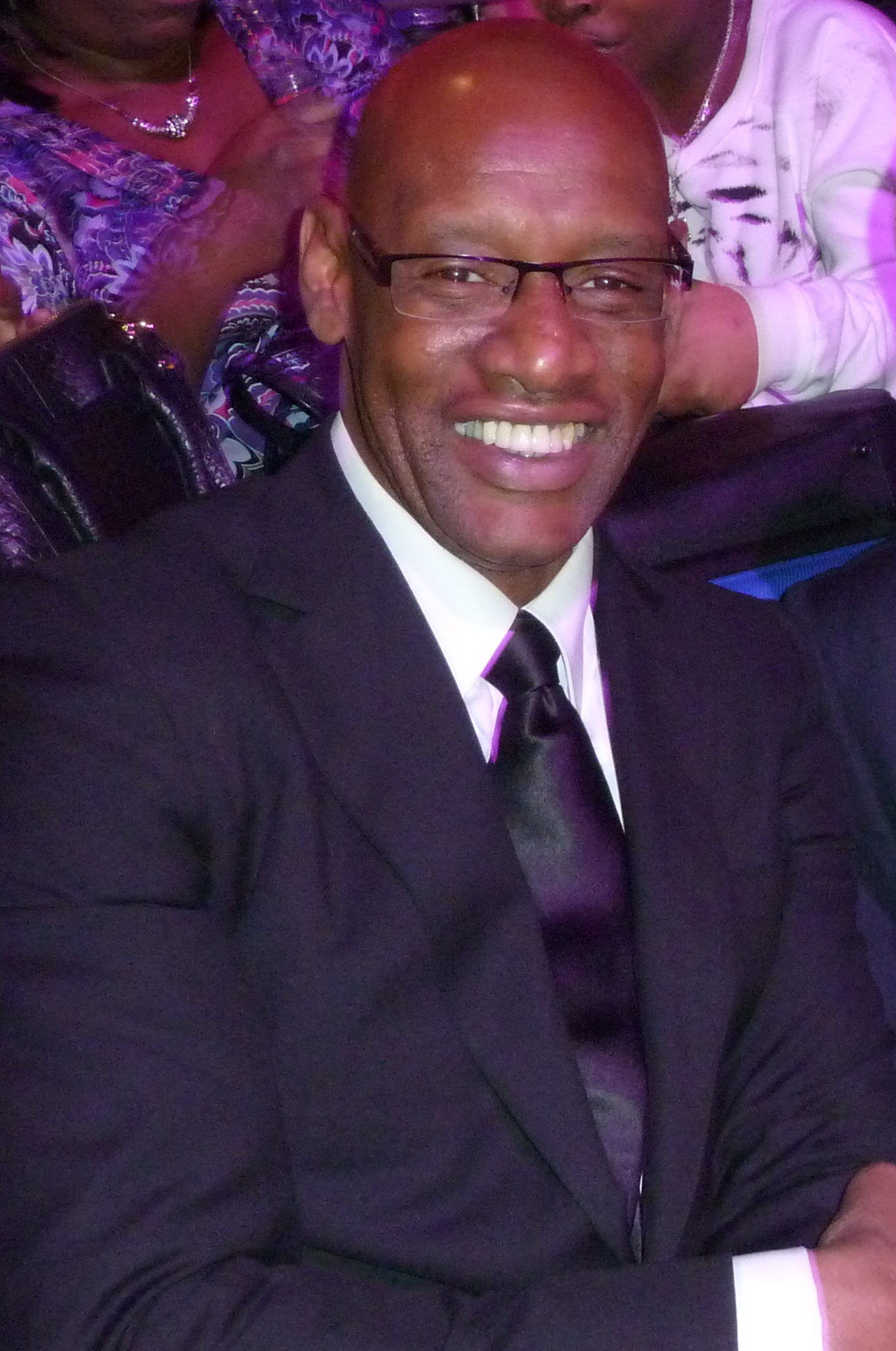
- Wallace in 2013
- Born: Shaun Anthony Linford Wallace; 2 June 1960 (age 66); London, England
- Other names: The Dark Destroyer (UK and New Zealand); The Destroyer (Australia)
- Occupations: Barrister, part-time lecturer and television personality
- Notable credit(s): The Chase (2009–present); The Chase Australia (2018)

Shaun Anthony Linford Wallace (born 2 June 1960) is an English barrister, lecturer and television personality. He is one of the six "chasers" on the ITV quiz show The Chase. Wallace is a part-time lecturer and visits schools, colleges and other institutions to educate students on aspects of law. He won Mastermind in 2004 and was ranked 286th in the World Quizzing Championships in 2012.

== Early life ==
Wallace was born on 2 June 1960 at Central Middlesex Hospital in London. He grew up in Wembley and briefly attended Copland School. He struggled academically, failing his O-level English examination four times. He graduated from the Polytechnic of North London with a Law BA in 1983.

== Career ==
=== Law ===
Wallace was called to the Bar in November 1984 and in 1986 completed pupilage. He has taken part in hearings held at both the Old Bailey as well as several magistrates' courts located in England and Wales and also in Scotland. He was a member of Farringdon Barristers Chambers until February 2012, when it was announced that he had joined Great James Street Chambers.

On 26 October 2016, Wallace was found to have failed to comply with his duty while representing a defendant in criminal proceedings. He was reprimanded and fined £2500.

Wallace is also a member of the southeastern circuit of the Criminal Bar Association. Owing to his heritage, he has been a member of the Jamaican Bar since 1999.

=== Television ===
In 2004, Wallace became a champion of the BBC general knowledge quiz Mastermind, which also tests a contestant's aptitude on a subject of their choice. His specialist subject in the final was FA Cup Finals.

Wallace was a finalist on the first series of Are You an Egghead?, narrowly losing out to Barry Simmons.

Other shows that he has been a contestant on include Fifteen to One and The Weakest Link, plus the British adaptation of Greed.

Since 2009, Wallace has appeared as a "chaser" on the UK television series The Chase, a teatime game show which airs on ITV. His nickname on the show is "The Dark Destroyer". The other chasers are Anne Hegerty, Paul Sinha, Mark Labbett, Jenny Ryan and Darragh Ennis. He also appears on The Chase: Celebrity Special, The Family Chase, and Beat The Chasers. In 2018, he featured as a guest chaser on the Australian version of the show, alongside fellow UK chasers Hegerty and Labbett. In Australia, he is known as "The Destroyer" owing to Australian concerns that the original nickname contained racial undertones, which Wallace himself disputed.

In 2018, his autobiography, Chasing the Dream, was released.

In 2019, Wallace appeared on the celebrity version of Catchphrase. He also appeared as a guest in "Dictionary Corner" on the Channel 4 gameshow Countdown. Wallace took part in the "Junk Food Experiment" in 2019.

In June 2020, Wallace appeared as an assistant in Alan Carr's Epic Gameshow, for the "Take Your Pick!" episode. In October 2020, Wallace appeared as a Black history month reporter for Good Morning Britain. In November 2020, Wallace took part as a contestant in ITV's Don't Rock The Boat, a rowing competition show.

=== Political activity and public activism ===
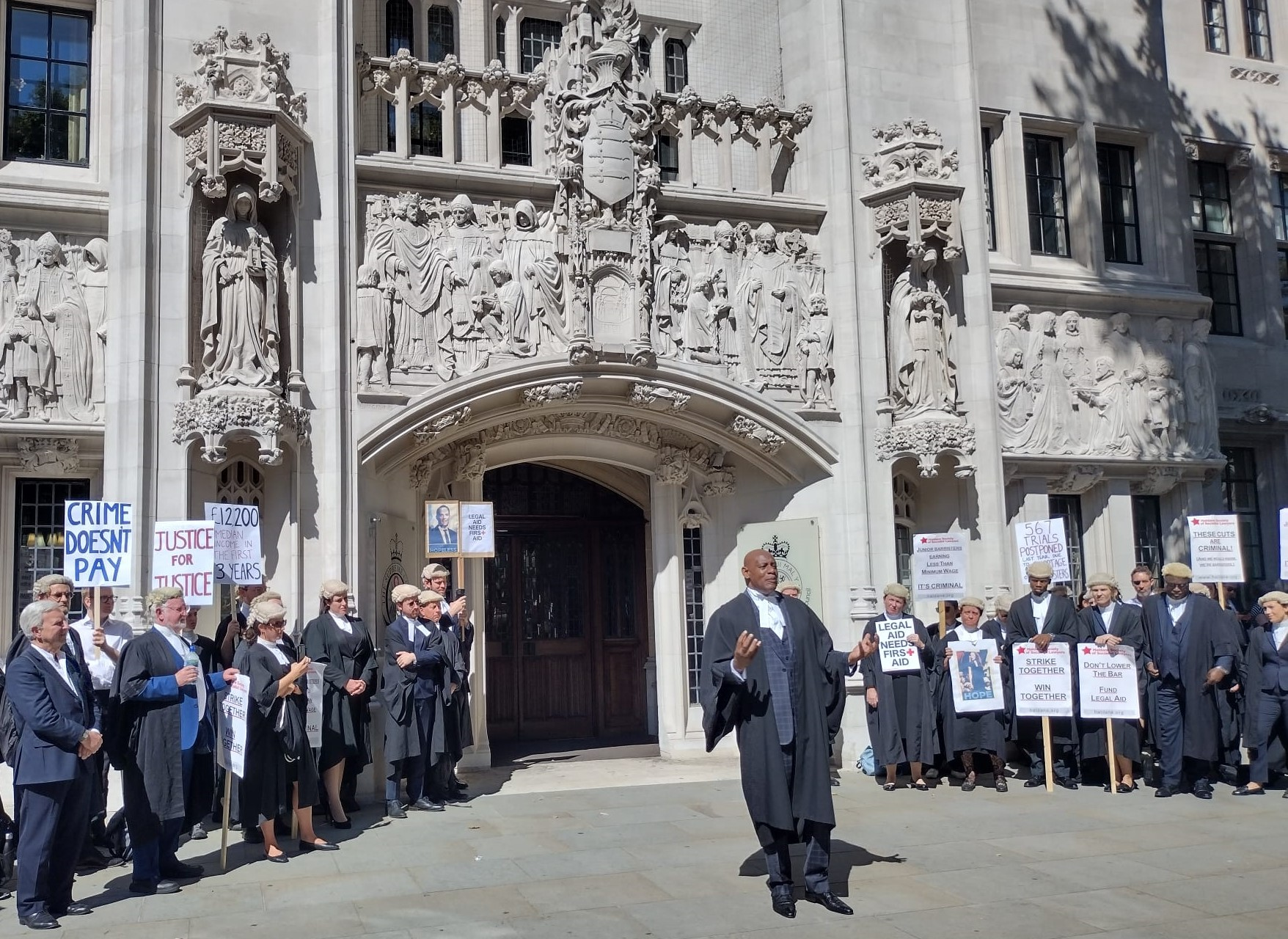
Wallace addresses a rally supporting the industrial action outside the Supreme Court, London, 11 July 2022

At the 2005 UK general election, Wallace stood as an independent parliamentary candidate, standing in the Brent South constituency in north London. He came fifth obtaining 297 votes (1.17% of the vote), losing to Labour's Dawn Butler with 17501 votes (69.23% of the vote).

In 2022, he supported the criminal barristers' industrial action over pay. Joining colleagues on a picket line outside the Supreme Court in London, Wallace said that legal aid fees should be increased to encourage young people and those from a diversity of backgrounds to become barristers.

== Personal life ==
He is of Jamaican heritage and is the eldest of four children. He is a football fan and a supporter of Chelsea.

In 2022, Wallace appeared on the ITV programme DNA Journey, which revealed many details about his African ancestry in Nigeria, his Caribbean ancestry in Jamaica and many other links to several other African countries besides Nigeria.

Wallace is a practising Christian, having been brought up with Christian values.

== Television ==
Year	Title	Role	Channel
2009–present	The Chase	Chaser	ITV
2018	The Chase Australia (guest chaser)	Chaser	Channel 7
2019	Celebrity Catchphrase	Contestant	ITV
2019	Countdown	Guest	Channel 4
2019	The Junk Food Experiment	Himself	ITV
2020, 2022	Alan Carr's Epic Gameshow	Himself; assistant	ITV
2020	Sorry, I Didn't Know	Himself	ITV
2020	Love Your Weekend with Alan Titchmarsh	Himself	ITV
2020	Don't Rock The Boat	Contestant	ITV
2021	The Chasers Road Trip: Trains Brains and Automobiles	Himself	ITV
2022	DNA Journey	Himself	ITV
