= Only Connect =

British quiz show

- Genre: Quiz show
- Presented by: Victoria Coren Mitchell
- Theme music composer: Dawson Sabatini
- Country of origin: United Kingdom
- Original language: English
- No. of series: 22
- No. of episodes: 536 (Note: As of 26 January 2026. The number of episodes comprises: 477 regular episodes (22 series).; 59 special episodes (beyond series count).)

Production
- Running time: 29 minutes
- Production companies: Presentable (2008–13); Parasol (2013–22); RDF Television (2013–24); Remarkable Entertainment (2024–)

Original release
- Network: BBC Four (2008–14); BBC Two (2014–)
- Release: 15 September 2008 – present

Only Connect is a British television quiz show presented by Victoria Coren Mitchell since 15 September 2008. In the series, teams compete in a tournament of finding connections between seemingly unrelated clues. The title is taken from a passage in E. M. Forster's 1910 novel Howards End: "Only connect the prose and the passion, and both will be exalted."

== History ==
Only Connect aired on BBC Four from 15 September 2008 to 7 July 2014, before moving to BBC Two from 1 September 2014. From 2008 until 2013 the show was recorded in Studio 1 at the ITV Cymru Wales Studios, based at Culverhouse Cross in Cardiff, which have now been demolished. It moved temporarily to Roath Lock Studios in Cardiff in late 2013, before settling in Enfys Studios in Cardiff from 2014 onwards.

The series is regularly the most watched programme of the week on BBC Two and is typically broadcast on Mondays between Mastermind and University Challenge as part of the channel's quiz night.

On 1 March 2010, an interactive online version of the Connecting Walls round was put on the Only Connect website. From mid-2011, coinciding with series 5, the website took online submissions for new Connecting Walls; the online game was discontinued for series 10.

In 2020, changes had to be made to the production of the show for series 16 because of the COVID-19 pandemic and new British government requirements and guidelines on television productions. For this new series, each team now sat at their desks socially distanced with perspex screens dividing the team members and no huddled conferring permitted. For the connecting wall round, each team stood socially distanced apart, with perspex screens separating them and only the team captain permitted to use the keyboard. These changes were kept in place up to and including series 18 but discontinued for series 19.

In June 2023, The New York Times introduced a daily word game called Connections. Several figures associated with Only Connect commented on its similarity to the Connecting Wall in the programme. In one episode, Coren Mitchell even described the New York Times version as "inferior" and "annoyingly weak".

Jack Waley-Cohen, who appeared in the first ever episode and was part of the runner up team in season 1, has since gone on to be one of the question editors on the show.

== Format ==
| M17 M17 | E23 | V28 |
| I9 | N35 N35 N35 | D10 |

Question labels
in hieroglyphs

Only Connect is deliberately difficult, and its contestants are often characterised – including within the show itself – as nerdy or geeky. Teams are encouraged to take names which reflect specialist interests or hobbies, such as the 'LARPers' or 'Francophiles'. The show's questions will cover any topic, and many may require knowledge of both arcane subject areas and popular culture. Questions may also be self-referential, or based on linguistic or numeric tricks, rather than requiring any particular factual knowledge. When presented with the clues, contestants are not told the type of the connection, and as such part of the gameplay involves establishing whether the connection is thematic, linguistic, factual, mathematical, etc.

Coren Mitchell's presenting includes very dry, sarcastic humour, which may include a gentle mocking of herself, the contestants, the viewers, the show's production team, celebrities, or other popular quizzes. On occasion Coren Mitchell will wear a wig or costume (such as a carnival mask or a complete pilgrim outfit), and no reference will be made to her appearance.

Each programme has two teams of three people competing in four rounds of gameplay. Before the show, a coin toss is conducted to determine the order of play, with the winner deciding to either play first in Rounds 1 and 2, or pass to their opponent and play first in Round 3. In the first three series, clues in Rounds 1 and 2 and the connecting walls in Round 3 were identified by Greek letters. In series 4 Coren Mitchell announced that this idea had been dropped, ostensibly due to viewer complaints that it was too pretentious. Henceforth Ancient Egyptian hieroglyphs (two reeds, lion, twisted flax, horned viper, water, and the eye of Horus) would be used instead. The show's opening sequence displayed Greek letters in the first episode of Series 4, but these were replaced with the hieroglyphs in subsequent episodes.

Series 1–6 had a straight round-robin "knockout" format, which was then modified to a double-elimination tournament. Coren Mitchell sometimes joked in the programme that even she did not fully understand how it works and, especially in Series 12–13, it felt like the gameplay never ends and contestants "play and play and play…" Series 12–13 shifted to a format identical to University Challenge, with a knockout first round combined with a repechage for the best performing losers and double-elimination quarter-finals. The number of competing teams has fluctuated: 16 in series 1, 3–6, 10–11, and from 14 onwards; 8 teams in series 2, 8 and 9; and 24 in series 12–13. The difficulty of questions generally increases by each round.

=== Round 1: Connections ===
Teams are given up to four clues and must try to figure out the connection between them within 40 seconds. The team is initially shown one clue, and may request the remaining three clues at any time within the 40 seconds (they are not automatically shown). The team may press their buzzer to guess after the first clue for 5 points, the second for 3, the third for 2, or the fourth for 1. If the team guesses incorrectly, fails to answer in a timely manner after buzzing, or fails to buzz within the time allotted, the opposing team is shown any remaining clues and can answer for a bonus point. Play then alternates until each team has played three sets of clues. Typically, one of the six puzzles involves pictures, and another uses pieces of music, both classical and contemporary, but teams have no way of identifying these questions before making their choices. Sound or Music questions are generally considered among the toughest questions in the quiz, and a team's dismay upon realising they have chosen the sound or music question is a frequent source of humour on the programme.

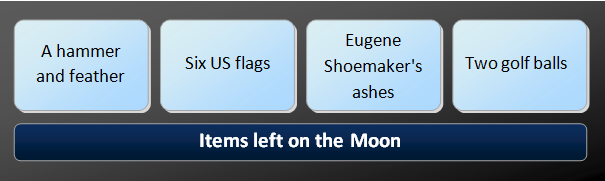
Example puzzle for Round 1. To earn points on this puzzle, teams would have to provide the answer "Items left on the Moon" (or a variant thereof).

=== Round 2: Sequences ===
In this round, each set of four clues forms a sequence. Teams may see a maximum of three clues, and must determine what would come fourth in the sequence within the 40 second time limit. As with the first round, teams score points dependent on the number of clues seen and if they fail to guess correctly, it is thrown over to the other team, who can see any remaining clues and answer for a bonus point. Some sequences can have multiple acceptable answers (for example, if the sequence is sources of Vitamins A, B, C, and D, any source of Vitamin D would be an accepted answer), while others may only have one. Teams can score points without correctly identifying what the sequence is, but may be required to do so if providing an answer not anticipated by the question writers or whose relevance to the sequence is ambiguous. As in the previous round, one set of clues involves pictures, with teams describing the fourth picture in the sequence, and starting from the quarterfinals of Series 10, there is occasionally a sequence made by three music clips, with contestants supplying the title or artist/s of the fourth unplayed music clip.

For example, sequential clues of "Anger", "Bargaining" and "Depression" would be correctly followed by "Acceptance", these being the 2nd to 5th stages of the Kübler-Ross model of grief.

=== Round 3: Connecting Wall ===
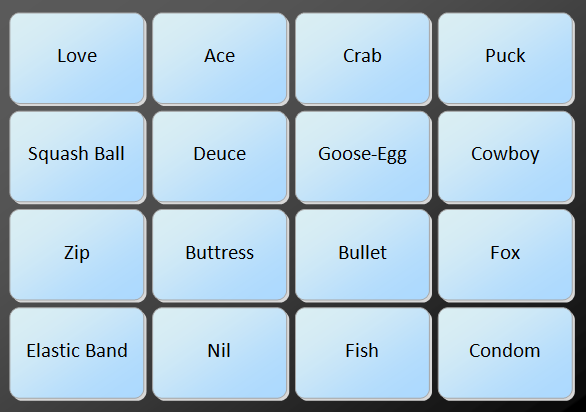
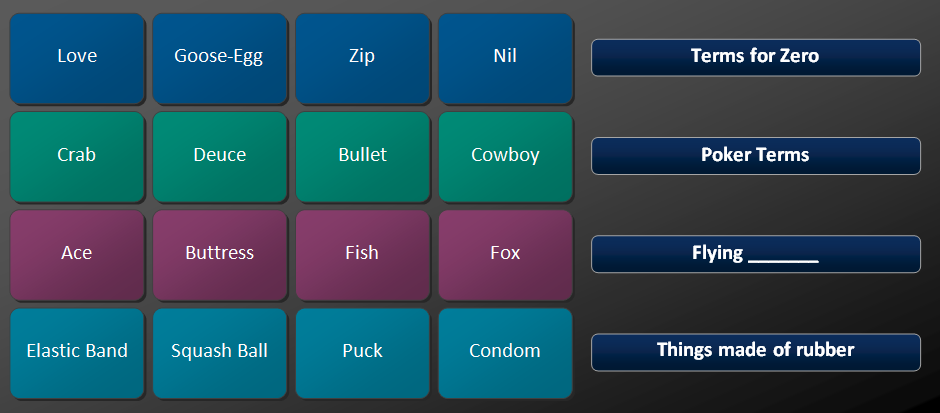
An example jumbled "Connecting Wall" puzzle and its solution.

Each team receives a wall of 16 clues and are given 2 minutes and 30 seconds to sort them into four groups of four connected items. The puzzles are designed to include red herrings and to suggest more connections than actually exist, as some clues appear to fit into more than one category, but there is only one perfect solution for each wall. Teams create groups one at a time by tapping on four tiles on the touchscreen, and can make unlimited guesses before finding two complete groups. Once two groups have been identified, teams are only given three chances to identify the remaining two groups before the wall freezes, even if there is time remaining on the clock.

Once all groups are found, time has expired, or all three lives are depleted, the team scores 1 point for each group found within 2 minutes 30 seconds, and any groups not found are shown. The team then scores 1 point for correctly identifying the connections in each group, including the groups they failed to find. If a team finds all four groups and correctly identifies all four connections, they are awarded 2 bonus points, for a maximum total of 10 points.

Unlike the previous rounds, the Connecting Walls are played in a separate room to the main studio with only one team playing at a time. The opposing team does not have the opportunity to score points from their opponents' wall or even to see what that wall is, as often the second wall will have a similar connection to the first, that the teams are oblivious to but may be easier for viewers to spot.

=== Round 4: Missing Vowels ===
In a final buzzer round, the teams are presented with a series of word puzzles. The category of the puzzles is given before they are displayed, and each category contains a maximum of four puzzles. Each puzzle is a word or phrase with the vowels removed and the spaces shifted to disguise the original words. For example, in a category of "Booker Prize-winning novels", a puzzle of "VR NNGDLT TL" would be correctly answered as "Vernon God Little".

Teams answer simultaneously using buzzers, and score 1 point for each puzzle they solve. Initially there was no penalty for guessing incorrectly on this round, but starting with the quarter-finals in Series 1, teams have faced a penalty of 1 point for each incorrect answer. Additionally, if the team that buzzes provides an incorrect answer (even by a single letter) or fails to answer quickly, the opposing team is given an opportunity to answer for a bonus point.

The round lasts for between 90 seconds and three minutes. The team with the most points at the end of the game is the winner. If teams are tied, then a single sudden-death puzzle is given to the captains of each team. If a captain buzzes in first and gives the correct answer then their team wins, but an incorrect answer gives the win to the other team. Although no category is officially given, they make reference to their own role as sudden-death questions. Examples are "So Long and Thanks for All the Fish", "To the Victor, the Spoils" and "Winner Stays On".

== Champions and runners-up ==
| Series | Champions | Runners-up |
|---|---|---|
| 1 | Crossworders; Mark Grant, David Stainer, Ian Bayley | Lapsed Psychologists; Richard McDougall, Jack Waley-Cohen, Matthew Stevens |
| 2 | Rugby Boys; Richard Parnell, Gary Dermody, Mark Labbett | Cambridge Quiz Society; Paul Beecher, Simon Spiro, Joshua Karton |
| 3 | Gamblers; Jenny Ryan, Dave Bill, Alan Gibbs | Strategists; Chris Cummins, Michael Dnes, Sarah Higgins |
| 4 | Epicureans; David Brewis, Katie Bramall-Stainer, Aaron Bell | Radio Addicts; Dave Clark, Gary Grant, Neil Phillips |
| 5 | Analysts; Paul Steeples, David Lea, William De Ath | Antiquarians; Simon Belcher, Will Howells, Debbie Challis |
| 6 | Scribes; Holly Pattenden, Dom Tait, Gareth Price | Draughtsmen; Andy Tucker, Iwan Thomas, Steve Dodding |
| 7 | Francophiles; Ian Clark, Mark Walton, Sam Goodyear | Celts; Beverly Downes, Huw Pritchard, David Pritchard |
| 8 | Board Gamers; Hywel Carver, Jamie Karran, Michael Wallace | Bakers; Tim Spain, Peter Steggle, Matt Rowbotham |
| 9 | Europhiles; Douglas Thomson, Mark Seager, Khuram Rashid | Relatives; Hamish Galloway, Davina Galloway, Nick Latham |
| 10 | Orienteers; Paul Beecher, Sean Blanchflower, Simon Spiro | Chessmen; Henry Pertinez, Stephen Pearson, Nick Mills |
| 11 | String Section; Tessa North, Richard Aubrey, Pete Sorel-Cameron | Wayfarers; Barbara Thompson, Gerard Mackay, Matt Beatson |
| 12 | Verbivores; Phyl Styles, Graeme Cole, Tom Cappleman | Cosmopolitans; Annette Fenner, Amy Godel, Emily Watnick |
| 13 | Escapologists; Frank Paul, Lydia Mizon, Tom Rowell | Belgophiles; Helen Fasham, Ben Fasham, Phil Small |
| 14 | Dicers; George Corfield, Hugh Binnie, Joey Goldman | Time Ladies; Charlotte Jackson, Rebecca Shaw, Emma Harris |
| 15 | 007s Frankie Fanko, Andrew Fanko, Andrew Beasley | Suits; Kyle Lam, Toby Nonnenmacher, Isi Bogod |
| 16 | Puzzle Hunters; Paul Taylor, Katie Steckles, Ali Lloyd | Dungeon Masters; Charlie Deeks, Anna Hayfield, Sam Hayfield |
| 17 | Data Wizards; Claire Turner, Tim Brown, Jonathan Cairns | Golfers; Evan Lynch, Frances Clark-Murray, George Charlson |
| 18 | Strigiformes; Jonathan Taylor, Jonathan Williams, Joshua Mutio | Crustaceans; Dennis, Alex Hardwick, Elia Cugini |
| 19 | Thrifters; Will Chadwick, Sam Haywood, Jack Karimi | Also Rans; Harry Heath, Dan Afshar, Claire Barrow |
| 20 | Four Opinions; Jacob Epstein, Rafi Dover, Aron Carr | Tea Totallers; Eleanor Ayres, Matt Taylor, Rob Sassoon |
| 21 | Pitchers; Alexia Jarvis, Paddy Pamment, Jonathan Gibson | 5ks Fiona Titcombe, James Haughton, Thomas Carey |

== Transmissions ==
=== Series ===
| Series | Channel | Episodes | Start date | End date | Tournament Format | Average viewers (millions) |
|---|---|---|---|---|---|---|
| 1 | BBC Four | 15 | 15 September 2008 | 22 December 2008 | 16-team single-elimination tournament | |
| 2 | BBC Four | 8 | 13 July 2009 | 31 August 2009 | 8-team single-elimination tournament with third-place match | |
| 3 | BBC Four | 15 | 4 January 2010 | 12 April 2010 | 16-team single-elimination tournament | 0.395 |
| 4 | BBC Four | 16 | 6 September 2010 | 27 December 2010 | 16-team single-elimination tournament with third-place match | 0.569 |
| 5 | BBC Four | 16 | 15 August 2011 | 5 December 2011 | 16-team single-elimination tournament with third-place match | 0.702 |
| 6 | BBC Four | 16 | 27 August 2012 | 17 December 2012 | 16-team single-elimination tournament with third-place match | 0.953 |
| 7 | BBC Four | 13 | 13 May 2013 | 5 August 2013 | 8-team modified double-elimination tournament | 0.858 |
| 8 | BBC Four | 13 | 23 September 2013 | 23 December 2013 | 8-team modified double-elimination tournament | 0.922 |
| 9 | BBC Four | 13 | 14 April 2014 | 7 July 2014 | 8-team modified double-elimination tournament | 0.769 |
| 10 | BBC Two | 27 | 1 September 2014 | 30 March 2015 | 16-team modified double-elimination tournament | 2.357 |
| 11 | BBC Two | 27 | 13 July 2015 | 18 January 2016 | 16-team modified double-elimination tournament | 2.334 |
| 12 | BBC Two | 37 | 11 July 2016 | 7 April 2017 | 24-team knockout based on University Challenge | 2.57 |
| 13 | BBC Two | 37 | 28 July 2017 | 30 April 2018 | 24-team knockout based on University Challenge | 1.999 |
| 14 | BBC Two | 28 | 22 October 2018 | 29 April 2019 | 16-team modified double-elimination with third-place match | 1.983 |
| 15 | BBC Two | 28 | 2 September 2019 | 30 March 2020 | 16-team modified double-elimination with third-place match | |
| 16 | BBC Two | 28 | 21 September 2020 | 29 March 2021 | 16-team modified double-elimination with third-place match | |
| 17 | BBC Two | 28 | 12 July 2021 | 24 January 2022 | 16-team modified double-elimination with third-place match | |
| 18 | BBC Two | 28 | 29 August 2022 | 13 March 2023 | 16-team modified double-elimination with third-place match | |
| 19 | BBC Two | 28 | 17 July 2023 | 29 January 2024 | 16-team modified double-elimination with third-place match | |
| 20 | BBC Two | 28 | 12 August 2024 | 3 March 2025 | 16-team modified double-elimination with third-place match | |
| 21 | BBC Two | 28 | 21 July 2025 | 26 January 2026 | 16-team modified double-elimination with third-place match | |
| 22 | BBC Two | 34 | 13 July 2026 | 2027 | 16-team modified double-elimination with expanded quarter-finals and third-place match | |

=== Specials ===
| Series (Note: Some specials appear in BBC’s episode guide as a part of a particular series, even though they are not relevant to the tournaments.) | Date | Title | Viewers | Weekly Ranking |
|---|---|---|---|---|
| — | 21 December 2009 | Series 1 vs Series 2 Winners Special | —N/a | —N/a |
| — | 15 November 2010 | Children in Need Special | 599,000 | 1 |
| — | 10 January 2011 | Series 3 vs Series 4 Winners Special | 558,000 | 1 |
| — | 17 January 2011 | University Challenge Special | 615,000 | 3 |
| — | 14 March 2011 | Comic Relief Special | 468,000 | 4 |
| — | 14 November 2011 | Children in Need Special | 794,000 | 3 |
| — | 12 December 2011 | Wall Night Special (Heats) | 673,000 | 3 |
| — | 12 December 2011 | Wall Night Special (Semi-finals & Final) | 523,000 | 5 |
| — | 2 January 2012 | Series 1 vs Series 4 Winners Special | 761,000 | 6 |
| — | 9 January 2012 | Only Connect vs Mastermind Special | 650,000 | 4 |
| — | 31 January 2012 | Wall Night Special 2 (Heats) | 634,000 | 5 |
| — | 31 January 2012 | Wall Night Special 2 (Semi-finals & Finals) | —N/a | —N/a |
| — | 19 March 2012 | Sport Relief Special | 706,000 | 2 |
| — | 12 November 2012 | Children in Need Special | 1,078,000 | 3 |
| — | 7 January 2013 | Series 5 vs Series 6 Winners Special | 982,000 | 1 |
| — | 14 January 2013 | Eggheads vs Davids | 1,173,000 | 1 |
| — | 11 March 2013 | Comic Relief Special | 999,000 | 1 |
| 7 | 11 November 2013 | Children in Need Special | 967,000 | 2 |
| 8 | 17 March 2014 | Sport Relief Special | 750,000 | 2 |
| 10 | 10 November 2014 | Children in Need Special | 2,280,000 | 10 |
| 10 | 9 March 2015 | Comic Relief Special | 2,422,000 | 7 |
| 11 | 9 November 2015 | Children in Need Special | 2,030,000 | 12 |
| 11 | 14 March 2016 | Sport Relief Special | 2,315,000 | 4 |
| 14 | 18 December 2018 | Champion of Champions Special: Europhiles (series 9) v String Section (series 11) | 1,749,000 | |
| 14 | 19 December 2018 | Sport Special: Footballers (series 6) v Korfballers (series 12) | 1,816,000 | |
| 14 | 20 December 2018 | Family Special: Lasletts (series 8) v Meeples (series 13) | 1,658,000 | |
| 14 | 25 December 2018 | Quiz Special: QI Elves (series 10) v Inquisitors (series 13) | 953,000 | |
| 15 | 30 December 2019 | Travel Special: Globetrotters (series 8) v Eurovisionaries (series 12) | 2,303,568 | 5 |
| 15 | 1 January 2020 | Happy Hour Special: Alesmen (series 4) v Cosmopolitans (series 12) | 1,948,505 | 10 |
| 15 | 2 January 2020 | Education Special: Beaks (series 13) v Clareites (series 12) | 1,997,764 | 9 |
| 15 | 3 January 2020 | Champion of Champions Special: Verbivores (series 12) v Escapologists (series 13) | 2,204,549 | 6 |
| 16 | 29 December 2020 | Christmas: Edwards Family (series 5) v Wrights (series 4) | 2,559,914 | 5 |
| 16 | 30 December 2020 | North and South: Scunthorpe Scholars (series 12) v Oxonians (series 10) | 2,445,075 | 7 |
| 16 | 31 December 2020 | Doctors: Medics (series 13) v Gallifreyans (series 10) | 2,407,190 | 8 |
| 16 | 1 January 2021 | Music: Festival Fans (series 7) v Choristers (series 15) | 2,499,923 | 6 |
| 17 | 27 December 2021 | Christmas: Turophiles (series 15) v Corkscrews (series 16) | TBA | TBA |
| 17 | 28 December 2021 | The Birds and the Bees: Birdwatchers (series 14) v Beekeepers (series 12) | TBA | TBA |
| 17 | 29 December 2021 | Cold: Nordiphiles (series 10) v Apres Skiers (series 16) | TBA | TBA |
| 17 | 30 December 2021 | Champions: 007s (series 15) v Puzzle Hunters (series 16) | TBA | TBA |
| 18 | 23 December 2022 | Christmas: Polyhymnians (series 16) v Channel Islanders (series 12) | TBA | TBA |
| 18 | 26 December 2022 | Mystery: Endeavours (series 15) v Whodunnits (series 16) | TBA | TBA |
| 18 | 27 December 2022 | Love: Part-Time Poets (series 12) v Romantics (series 10) | TBA | TBA |
| 18 | 28 December 2022 | Champion of Champions: Dicers (series 14) v Data Wizards (series 17) | TBA | TBA |
| 19 | 19 December 2023 | Christmas: Relatives (series 9) v Muppets (series 17) | TBA | TBA |
| 19 | 20 December 2023 | Fashion: Dandies (series 13) v Peacocks (series 18) | TBA | TBA |
| 19 | 26 December 2023 | Boxing: Wrestlers (series 12) v Arrowheads (series 13) | TBA | TBA |
| 19 | 28 December 2023 | Politics: Politicians v Activists | TBA | TBA |
| 20 | 23 December 2024 | Royal Special: Vikings (series 13) v Antiquarians (series 5) | TBA | TBA |
| 20 | 24 December 2024 | Christmas Special: Mothers Ruined (series 18) v Godyn Family (series 17) | TBA | TBA |
| 20 | 26 December 2024 | Books Special: Orwellians (series 15) v Jillies (series 18) | TBA | TBA |
| 20 | 27 December 2024 | BBC Special: Bankers (series 1) v Science Writers (series 1) | TBA | TBA |
| 20 | 30 December 2024 | Transatlantic Special: Cinephiles (series 6) v Harlequins (series 18) | TBA | TBA |
| 20 | 31 December 2024 | Single Special: Brews (series 14) v Irregulars (series 18) | TBA | TBA |
| 20 | 1 January 2025 | Sounds Special: Record Collectors (series 9) v Jukeboxers (series 17) | TBA | TBA |
| 20 | 2 January 2025 | Champion of Champions Special: Strigiformes (series 18) v Thrifters (series 19) | TBA | TBA |
| 21 | 23 December 2025 | The Only Connect Pub Quiz: Hopsters (series 20) v Taverners (series 12) | TBA | TBA |
| 21 | 24 December 2025 | Christmas Special: Whitcombes (series 16) v Gardners (series 19) | TBA | TBA |
| 21 | 30 December 2025 | Law Special: Cartophiles (series 7) v Harmonics (series 20) | TBA | TBA |
| 21 | 31 December 2025 | Third-Place Play-Off Play-Off Special: Poptimists (series 14) v Ramblers (series 17) | TBA | TBA |
