= Jenny Ryan =

English quizzer and singer (born 1982)

- Born: Jenny Alexis Ryan; 2 April 1982 (age 44); Bolton, Greater Manchester, England
- Other names: The Vixen; The Bolton Brainiac; The Bolton Bombshell
- Education: University of Leeds
- Occupations: Quizzer; singer; television personality
- Years active: 2002–present
- Television: The Chase; The X Factor: Celebrity; Beat the Chasers
- Website: www.jennyvixenryan.com

Jenny Alexis Ryan (born 2 April 1982) is an English quizzer, singer and television personality, best known as one of the six chasers on the ITV game show The Chase, where she is nicknamed "The Vixen".

== Life and career ==
Ryan grew up in Horwich, near Bolton.

Ryan's first quiz show appearance was on University Challenge, helping the University of Leeds to reach the semi-finals in 2003. She also appeared on Mastermind in 2006, choosing the American television series Buffy the Vampire Slayer as her specialist subject, and appeared in both series of Are You an Egghead? in 2008 and 2009. She found success on Only Connect as a member of the team The Gamblers, who won the third series of the show in 2010. Additionally, she has made appearances on Fifteen to One and Weakest Link, and worked as a QI Elf.

Ryan has written questions for game shows. She joined The Chase as a chaser in 2015, making her debut appearance on 2 September. She was recommended for The Chase by Anne Hegerty, as they had competed on the same quiz team, with Ryan serving as captain. She has also played in the Quiz League of London since 2008. Her nickname on the show is "The Vixen", in reference to her red hair, freckles and ponytail; Bradley Walsh came up with the name and the producers liked it since "vixens are notoriously clever and cunning". She is also referred to as "The Bolton Brainiac" and "The Bolton Bombshell".

In 2017, Ryan appeared alongside fellow chasers Anne Hegerty, Shaun Wallace and Mark Labbett on Let's Sing and Dance for Comic Relief. They won the competition, performing a Wizard of Oz medley.

In 2018 Ryan, along with comedian Lucy Porter, launched Fingers On Buzzers, a podcast about quiz and game shows. The duo appeared on Richard Herring's Leicester Square Theatre Podcast in early 2019, where they discussed Fingers On Buzzers and other topics.

In July 2019, Ryan appeared on the 14th series of Celebrity MasterChef. In October 2019, she began competing in The X Factor: Celebrity. She was initially eliminated before the live shows, with heavy criticism of this decision from viewers leading to her being asked back to join the live shows. She went on to reach the final and finished in third place.

Ryan also plays the ukulele.

The X Factor: Celebrity performances and results
Show	Song choice	Result
Auditions	"Somebody to Love" – Queen	Eliminated, reinstated
Live show 1	"Rise Like a Phoenix" – Conchita Wurst	Safe, given Safe Seat
Live Show 2	"This Is My Life" – Shirley Bassey	Safe
Live Show 3	"The Edge of Glory" – Lady Gaga	Safe
Live Show 4	"Euphoria" – Loreen	Safe
Semi-Final	"Skyfall" – Adele	Safe
Final	"Have Yourself a Merry Little Christmas" – Judy Garland	Safe (3rd)
Final	"The Edge of Glory" – Lady Gaga	Third Place

== Filmography ==
Year	Title	Role	Notes
2003	University Challenge	Contestant	Semi-finalist
2006	Mastermind	Contestant	1 episode
2008–2009	Are You an Egghead?	Contestant	2 series
2010	Only Connect	Contestant / The Gamblers	Winner
2015–present	The Chase	Chaser / The Vixen	7 series (11-15 regular); 6 series (celebrity); 2 series (family)
2019	Celebrity MasterChef	Contestant	Series 14
2020	Supermarket Sweep	Contestant	Winner
2020–present	Beat the Chasers	Chaser / The Vixen	4 series
2021	Catchphrase Celebrity Special	Contestant	Winner
2022	Would I Lie to You?	Panelist	With Lee Mack and Stephen Mulhern
2022	The Masked Singer Live	Contestant	Appeared as Baby Dino in Newcastle
2022	Britain Get Singing	Contestant	With Anne Hegerty and Darragh Ennis
2026	The Box	Contestant	Series 1
