= Anne Hegerty =

English television personality and quizzer (born 1958)

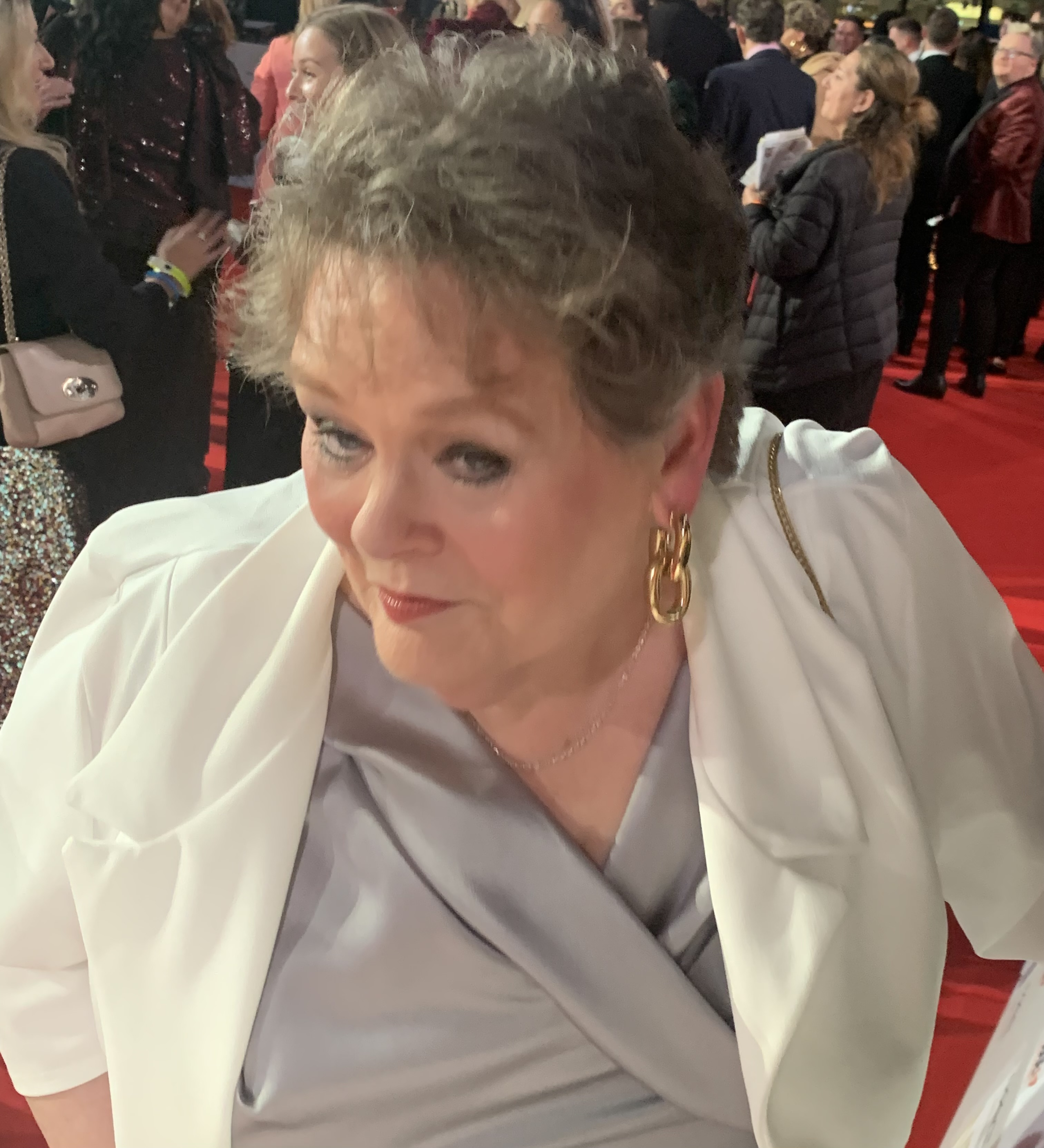
- Hegerty in 2022
- Born: Anne Solway Hegerty; 14 July 1958 (age 68); Westminster, London, England
- Other name: The Governess
- Education: University of Edinburgh (BA)
- Occupations: Quizzer; television personality
- Years active: 2010–present
- Known for: The Chase (2010–present), The Chase Australia (2015–present)

Anne Solway Hegerty (born 14 July 1958) is a British professional quizzer and television personality. Since 2010, she has been a "chaser" on the ITV game show The Chase as "The Governess". In 2018 she was a contestant on the 18th series of the ITV reality show I'm a Celebrity...Get Me Out of Here!

== Early life ==
Anne Solway Hegerty was born in the Westminster area of London on 14 July 1958. She studied journalism at the University of Edinburgh. She started her journalistic career in the 1980s as a reporter and feature writer at the South Wales Argus in Newport, before moving to Manchester. She also worked as a ghostwriter and wrote two books for American children's author Richard Scarry, but she said that the books "were a bit rubbish and nobody bought them".

== Career ==
Hegerty is one of the chasers on the ITV game show The Chase, alongside Mark Labbett, Shaun Wallace, Paul Sinha, Jenny Ryan and Darragh Ennis. As well as being in the British version, she is also a chaser in the Australian and New Zealand versions of the show, on the Seven Network and TVNZ respectively. Hegerty has made appearances on several other quiz shows, including Mastermind, Fifteen to One, Today's the Day, Are You an Egghead? and Brain of Britain. As of October 2016, she was ranked 55th (and second among women) in the World Quizzing Championships.

In November 2013, she competed in the Bolton Premier Quiz League to become Brain of Bolton for the second time. She also competes in both the Quiz League of London and the Online Quiz League for the team Pericardium, placing 26th individually in the latter as of January 2023. Hegerty was the Phone-a-Friend for Lisa Harman from Ecclesfield, a contestant on The Chase in 2009, on Who Wants to Be a Millionaire? in 2010: Harman won £75,000. Hegerty correctly answered the question about the author of Twilight, Stephenie Meyer.

In December 2014, Hegerty appeared in the pantomime Cinderella as the Wicked Stepmother at the Grange Theatre in Northwich. In December 2015, she appeared as Fleshcreep in the pantomime Jack and the Beanstalk at the Civic Hall, Ellesmere Port, which was also booked for performance at Heywood and Radcliffe.

At Easter 2016, Hegerty appeared as the Enchantress in the pantomime Beauty and the Beast, alongside Keith Chegwin and Basil Brush, at the Palace Theatre, Redditch, which sold out, and other venues. From 6 December 2016 until 1 January 2017, she appeared as Blackweed in the pantomime Jack and the Beanstalk at the Kings Theatre, Southsea, Portsmouth. From 8 to 31 December 2017, she appeared as The Empress of China in the pantomime Aladdin at the Princess Theatre (Torquay). From 18 December 2018 until 6 January 2019, she appeared as Queen Rat in the pantomime Dick Whittington at the Theatre Royal (Windsor); Anita Harris played the role until Hegerty returned from I'm a Celebrity ... Get Me Out of Here. From 5 December 2019 to 5 January 2020, she appeared as Carabosse in the pantomime Sleeping Beauty at Middlesbrough Theatre.

From January 2018 to May 2021, Hegerty presented Britain's Brightest Family on ITV. Hegerty came in 75th place in the World Quizzing Championship of 2018, and 122nd in 2019. In November 2018, Hegerty participated in series 18 of I'm a Celebrity...Get Me Out of Here!, where she finished in seventh place. Outside of television, she appeared in a special video on YouTube with her whispering fan fiction for an ASMR video.

== Charity work ==
In 2018, she joined 26 other celebrities at Metropolis Studios to record an original Christmas song called "Rock With Rudolph", written and produced by Grahame and Jack Corbyn. The song was in aid of Great Ormond Street Hospital. It was released digitally through independent record label Saga Entertainment in November 2018 under the artist name the Celebs. The music video debuted exclusively with The Sun on 29 November 2018 and had its first TV showing on Good Morning Britain on 30 November 2018.

In 2020, amid the COVID-19 pandemic, Hegerty rejoined the Celebs, which now included Frank Bruno and X Factor winner Sam Bailey, to raise money for the Alzheimer's Society and Action for Children. They recorded a new rendition of "Merry Christmas Everyone" by Shakin' Stevens and it was released digitally on 11 December 2020 by Saga Entertainment. The music video debuted on Good Morning Britain the day before the song's release.

In 2021, Hegerty rejoined the Celebs to record a cover of the Beatles classic "Let It Be", a song produced by Grahame and Jack Corbyn assisted by Stephen Large. The song was recorded at Metropolis Studios, in support of Mind, and released on 3 December 2021 by Saga Entertainment. Hegerty was part of a choir of celebrities including Georgia Hirst, Ivan Kaye and Eunice Olumide who were backing EastEnders star Shona McGarty.

In September 2022, Hegerty rejoined The Celebs alongside Faye Barker and Jo O'Meara to raise money for Great Ormond Street Hospital, with a rendition of Michael Jackson's song "Thriller", marking the 40th anniversary of the album.

== Personal life ==
Hegerty lives in Manchester. She is a practising Catholic. She was diagnosed with Asperger syndrome when she was in her 40s.

In 2022, she featured on the ITV programme DNA Journey.

== Filmography ==
Year	Title	Role	Notes
1988	Mastermind	Contestant	1 episode
2010–present	The Chase	Chaser / The Governess	18 series (regular); 15 series (celebrity); 2 series (family); 1 series (Around The World)
2015–present	The Chase Australia	Chaser / The Governess	9 series (regular); 1 series (celebrity)
2018–2021	Britain's Brightest Family	Presenter	2 series (regular); 2 series (celebrity)
2018	I'm a Celebrity...Get Me Out of Here!	Contestant	7th place
2020–present	Beat the Chasers	Chaser / The Governess	7 series
2021	The Chasers Road Trip: Trains, Brains and Automobiles	Herself	1 series
2021	Celebrity Catchphrase	Herself	1 episode
2025	The Chase New Zealand	Chaser / The Governess	1 4-episode series (regular)
