= Mark Labbett =

English television personality

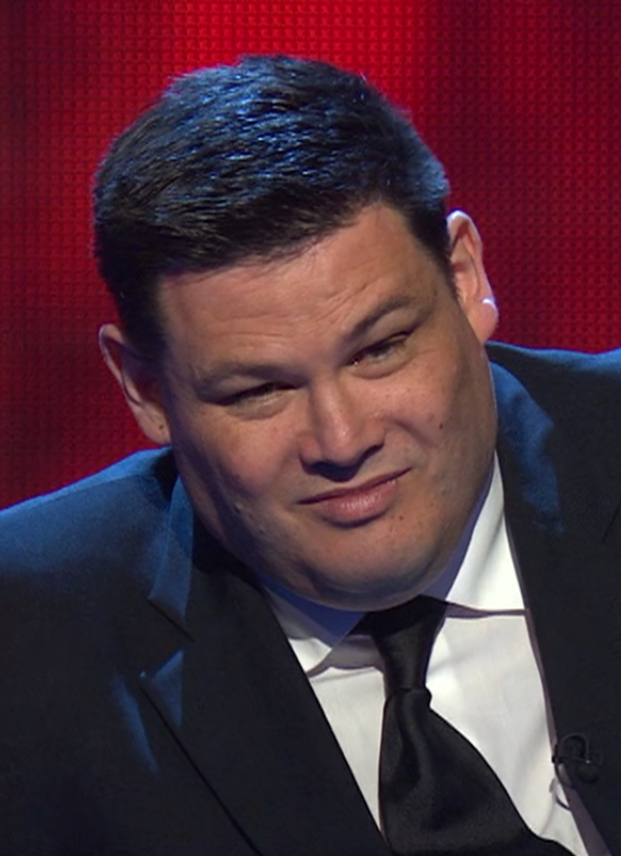
- Labbett on The Chase USA in 2014
- Born: Mark Andrew Labbett; 15 August 1965 (age 61); Tiverton, Devon, England
- Other name: "The Beast"
- Education: Exeter College, Oxford (BA); University of Exeter (PGCE)
- Occupation: Television personality
- Years active: 1999–present
- Notable credit(s): The Chase (2009–present); The Chase USA (2013–2015, 2021–2022); The Chase Australia (2016–2020, 2022, 2024-2025), Master Minds (2023)
- Spouse: Katie Labbett (m. 2014; sep. 2020)
- Children: 1

Mark Andrew Labbett (born 15 August 1965), also known by his professional nickname "The Beast", is an English professional quizzer and television personality. Since 2009 he has been one of the "chasers" on the ITV game show The Chase. He appeared between 2013 and 2015 on GSN's American version as their sole chaser; between 2016 and 2020 as one of six chasers on the Australian version; and as one of four chasers in the second season of ABC's American revival and from late February 2022 rejoined the Australian version of the show.

Labbett has appeared as a contestant on other television quiz shows and is a regular in quizzing competitions.

== Early life ==
Mark Andrew Labbett was born on 15 August 1965 in Tiverton, Devon, and attended Bishop Wordsworth's School in Salisbury.

Labbett obtained a Master of Arts degree in mathematics from Exeter College, Oxford, a Postgraduate Certificate in Education (PGCE) in secondary education from the University of Exeter and legal CPE and LPC qualifications from the University of Glamorgan (now the University of South Wales).

== Career ==
=== Teaching ===
Labbett was a mathematics and physical education supply teacher.

=== Quizzing ===
Labbett became interested in quizzing when working at Butlins holiday camp, where he supplemented his income with winnings from the quiz machines. His pub quiz team won a weekend in Paris in April 2001 after competing in the national competition Jumbo Quiz.

Labbett appeared on Mastermind in 1999, where his specialist subject was the Olympic Games. He appeared again on Mastermind in 2000, with the animated television show The Simpsons as his specialist subject. Also in 2000, he competed on Countdown, narrowly losing his first game on a crucial conundrum. In 2001, he appeared on Stake Out, where he was the second contestant eliminated during the Face Off round. In 2003, he appeared on Grand Slam, where he lost against Clive Spate in his first match.

In 2004, he won £500 on the Channel 5 show BrainTeaser, and a year later he won £1,500 on BBC One's SUDO-Q. He appeared on Who Wants to be a Millionaire? twice, firstly on fastest finger first in Series 18 broadcast on 5 November 2005. He returned the following series (19) and made the hot seat, winning £32,000 across two episodes in April 2006. In 2005, he also won £32,000 on Millionaire Live, a live version of Who Wants to Be a Millionaire? that toured seaside resorts throughout the summer.

As captain, he led the Welsh quiz team to fifth place in the 2006 European Quizzing Championships.

Labbett's team, the Rugby Boys, won BBC Four's Only Connect in 2009. Other television appearances include The National Lottery People's Quiz (2007) where he came second in the grand final, University Challenge (1996–97) where he reached the quarter-finals as captain of the Glamorgan University team, and Are You an Egghead?

In 2012, Labbett was ranked 89th in the World Quizzing Championships.

==== The Chase ====
Labbett is one of the "chasers" in the ITV quiz show The Chase, first broadcast in 2009 and hosted by Bradley Walsh. In the show, his nickname is "the Beast", a two-pronged nickname referencing both his stature and his surname (Labbett sounds like the French la bête, meaning "the beast"). In 2011, Labbett appeared as a chaser on The Celebrity Chase.

In August 2013, Labbett appeared as the only chaser on the American version of The Chase on Game Show Network. He also appeared as one of the seven chasers on the Australian version of The Chase on the Seven Network, alongside fellow UK chasers Anne Hegerty and Shaun Wallace. His weakest subjects are horse racing and soap operas. He noted that the American version posed far more difficulties for him, as American game shows typically allow far more competent contestants than British or Australian shows.

Labbett joined ABC's US revival of The Chase for its second season. Although ABC had considered adding Labbett to the show with its first season, his contract was not renewed for the third.

In 2017, Labbett appeared in The Family Chase and since 2020 he has appeared as one of the six chasers on Beat the Chasers.

=== Other endeavours ===
In 2016, Labbett took part in the three-part ITV series Sugar Free Farm, when he revealed he has false teeth, as a result of eating too much sugar. That same year, it was announced that he would become a producer for Hull-based wrestling promotion New Generation Wrestling (NGW). Since 2024 Labbett has made physical appearances on New Generation Wrestling, entering the ring a few times, and even slapping pro wrestler Myles Kayman during a show in January 2025. He also made an appearance at the promotion's Ultimate Showdown event.

In 2023, Labbett joined Game Show Network's Master Minds, reuniting with Brooke Burns. Labbett served as the show's prominent expert.

Labbett played Roger in the 2024 film A Toast to Love.

In 2025, Labbett appeared as the special guest in an episode of Horrible Histories. In 2025 Labbett joined the Celebs Go Dating agency and has appeared in one episode.

== Personal life ==
Labbett moved to Caldicot, Monmouthshire, in 1998 and then to nearby Newport in 2003 before moving to Moorgate, Rotherham, in 2013. Labbett married his second cousin Katie in 2014, who is 27 years his junior. They separated in 2020. Together, they had a son.

Following Labbett's separation from his wife, in early 2023, he began dating television presenter Hayley Palmer. The relationship ended in 2024.

Labbett supports Sheffield United. In the Australian Football League, he supports the Western Bulldogs.

In 2025, Labbett revealed he had been diagnosed with Type 2 diabetes. He said that he once weighed 29 stone (406 lbs), but had lost 10 stone (140 lbs) since the COVID-19 pandemic, because of spending more time with his son, and a lack of appetite since the virus.

== Television ==
Year	Title	Role	Channel
2009–present	The Chase	Chaser	ITV
2011–present	The Chase: Celebrity Specials	Chaser	ITV
2013–2015, 2021–2022	The Chase USA	Chaser	Game Show Network, ABC
2016–2020, 2022, 2024-2025	The Chase Australia	Chaser	Channel 7
2017–present	The Family Chase	Chaser	ITV
2020–present	Beat the Chasers	Chaser	ITV
2021	The Chasers Road Trip: Trains Brains and Automobiles	Himself	ITV
2023–present	Master Minds	Master Minds	Game Show Network

=== Guest appearances ===
- University Challenge (1996–97) – contestant
- Mastermind (1999, 2000) – contestant
- Countdown (2000) – contestant
- Stake Out (2001) – contestant
- Grand Slam (2003) – contestant
- BrainTeaser (2004) – contestant
- SUDO-Q (2005) – contestant
- Eggheads (2005) – contestant (as a member of the "Mighty Ducks")
- Who Wants to Be a Millionaire? (2006) – contestant
- The National Lottery People's Quiz (2007) – contestant
- Are You an Egghead? (2008) – contestant
- Battle of the Brains (2008) – contestant
- Only Connect (2009) – contestant
- Sugar Free Farm (2016) – participant
- Tipping Point: Lucky Stars (2016) – contestant
- Let's Sing and Dance for Comic Relief (2017) – participant winner
- Celebrity Juice (2017) – participant
- Loose Women (2017) – guest
- Celebrity Catchphrase (2024) – contestant
- Horrible Histories (2025) – guest host
