= Paul Sinha =

British comedian and quizzer

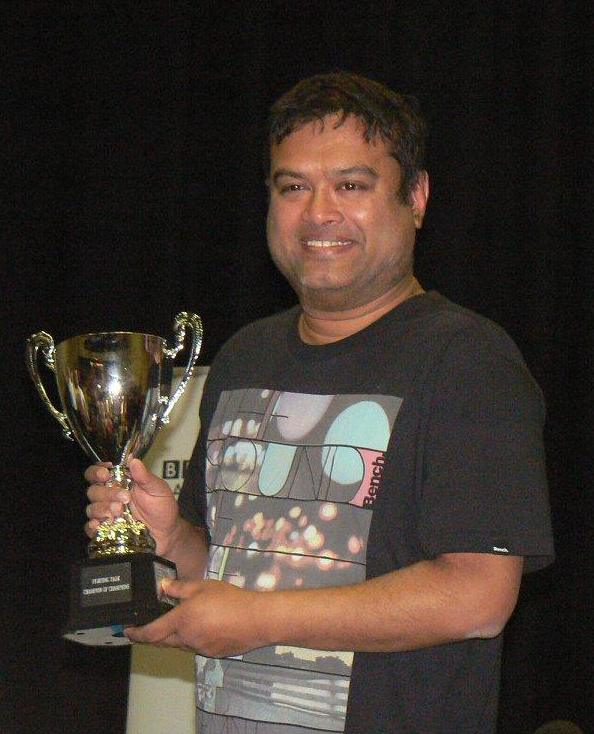
- Sinha in 2015 holding the Fighting Talk Champion of Champions Trophy
- Born: Supriya Kumar Sinha; 28 May 1970 (age 56); Luton, Bedfordshire, England
- Other names: The Sinnerman/Sinhaman; Sarcasm in a Suit; The Smiling Assassin
- Education: Dulwich College
- Alma mater: St George's, University of London
- Occupations: Comedian; television presenter; television personality; doctor; disc jockey
- Years active: 1996–present
- Spouse: Oliver Levy (m. 2019)
- Awards: Rose d'Or winner (2016)
- Website: www.paulsinha.com

Supriya Kumar "Paul" Sinha (born 28 May 1970) is a British professional quizzer, doctor, and comedian. He has written and performed extensively on BBC Radio 4, and is one of the six Chasers on the ITV game show The Chase.

== Early life ==
Supriya Kumar Sinha was born on 28 May 1970 to Bengali Hindu parents. His father and paternal grandfather were doctors; his mother was a nurse. He attributes the name Paul to a "misunderstanding with nursing staff" in the newsletter announcing his birth, and says that this name "stuck".

In a 2024 interview with The Big Issue, Sinha described a racially motivated mugging he experienced at age 16; while he was on the train to a Liverpool F.C. match, some fellow football fans mocked his accent and ethnic background before stealing his watch.

Sinha was educated at Dulwich College and St George's Hospital Medical School. He is a former general practitioner, qualifying in the 1990s. While at medical school he developed a taste for the stage in St George's annual revue and refined his comedy as co-editor of the medical school newsletter, popularly known as the Slag Mag.

== Career ==
=== Stand-up comedy ===
Sinha began performing stand-up while working as a junior doctor in hospitals in London and King's Lynn. His early material drew on his sexuality and ethnicity, with heavy use of puns. In 1999, he came third in the final of the Hackney Empire New Act of the Year.

After several years of combining touring with his nascent medical career, Sinha's breakthrough came with his second solo Edinburgh show, Saint or Sinha?, which earned him an if.comeddie nomination in 2006.

==== Edinburgh Festival Fringe shows ====
- 2004, Aspects of Love, Actually
- 2006, Saint or Sinha? (if.comeddie award nomination)
- 2007, King of the World
- 2009, 39 Years of Solitude
- 2010, Extreme Anti-White Vitriol
- 2011, Looking at the Stars
- 2015, Postcards from the Z List
- 2017, Shout Out to my Ex
- 2018, The Two Ages of Man
- 2022, One Sinha Lifetime
- 2023, Pauly Bengali
- 2025, 2 Sinha Lifetime

=== Radio ===
Sinha has performed many times on BBC Radio 4, on shows including The News Quiz, The Now Show, Loose Ends, 28 Acts in 28 Minutes, Shappi Talk and Just a Minute. His interest in football (he is a Liverpool F.C. fan) and cricket has led to appearances on BBC Radio 5 Live, most notably on Fighting Talk, where he has won the Champion of Champions finale twice. He has also appeared on Talksport.

He has appeared as a guest on Midweek, Woman's Hour, Broadcasting House and as a political pundit on PM.

In March 2011, Sinha presented his own BBC Radio 4 programme, Paul Sinha's Quiz Culture, in which he explored the world of competitive quizzing. His second documentary, The Sinha Test, aired on 14 July 2011 and examined patriotism and sporting allegiance. In July 2012, he wrote and presented a programme called The Sinha Games on BBC Radio 4 about the Olympic Games and his experience as a Londoner.

In 2013, Sinha wrote and performed his first series on BBC Radio 4, Paul Sinha's Citizenship Test.. This was followed in 2014 by Paul Sinha's History Revision. A second series of History Revision followed in May 2016, winning the Rose d'Or for Radio Comedy. The follow-up, Paul Sinha's General Knowledge, has completed its third series. In 2022, Paul Sinha wrote and starred in Paul Sinha's Perfect Pub Quiz.

Sinha is a regular panellist on Round Britain Quiz, representing the South of England with Marcus Berkmann.

=== Quizzing ===
After an appearance on The Weakest Link (where he was voted off fourth), Sinha made appearances on University Challenge: The Professionals (lost), Are You an Egghead? (lost in first round), Mastermind (fourth) and Brain of Britain (third). Sinha was ranked seventh in the National Quiz Rankings (as of 30 May 2017), and placed 11th in the 2018 World Quizzing Championships. Sinha also plays in the Quiz League of London for the Gray Monks and in the Online Quiz League for Quiz Machine Kills Fascists.

In 2011, Sinha joined the ITV quiz series The Chase as the fourth "Chaser", with the nicknames "The Sinnerman", "The Smiling Assassin" and "Sarcasm in a Suit". His first episode was broadcast in the fourth series on 8 September 2011. He also appears in celebrity and family editions of the show. Sinha has said that he feels that he and the show are more well-known overseas, particularly in New Zealand where people are more likely to get home from work in time to watch it.

=== Television ===
In 2019, he appeared on Series 8 of Taskmaster, finishing in last place with 136 points.

In January 2021, Sinha began hosting his own quiz show for ITV, called Paul Sinha's TV Showdown, featuring celebrities who go head to head together in a bid to answer as many questions as they can on TV knowledge. The show commenced on 9 January 2021, and concluded on 13 February 2021. A second series was commissioned and premiered 19 February 2022, released weekly until 2 April 2022.

== Personal life ==
Sinha was diagnosed with Parkinson's disease in May 2019, after a consultant noticed him displaying early symptoms while watching him on Taskmaster. He has described his approach to the condition as "an act of pragmatism", stating "I've got a life to lead [...] the more things I can do within the parameters of my illness, the better living I’ll make."

Sinha is openly gay, having been outed to his mother while in medical school, and married Oliver Levy on 14 December 2019.

On 20 June 2024, Sinha's autobiography One Sinha Lifetime was released and published by Penguin Books.

Preceded by Justin Moorhouse	BBC Radio 5 Live; Fighting Talk Champion of Champions; 2014/15 and 2015/16	Succeeded by Richard Osman
