= Quiz (play) =

Play by James Graham

- Official poster of the 2018 West End production
- Original language: English
- Written by: James Graham
- Setting: 2001, Who Wants to Be a Millionaire?

Premiere
- Date: 10 November 2017
- Place: Minerva Theatre, Chichester

Quiz is a play written by James Graham. Originally commissioned by theatre producer, William Village, it made its world premiere at the Minerva Theatre, Chichester, in November 2017, before transferring to the Noël Coward Theatre in London's West End in March 2018. The play centres on the true story of Charles Ingram and the coughing scandal that surrounded his 2001 win of £1,000,000 on Who Wants to Be a Millionaire?. In 2020, the stage play was adapted for a TV series of the same name.

== Background ==
Quiz is written by British playwright James Graham. The play centres around the true story of Charles Ingram (who later came to be known as "the Coughing Major") and the coughing scandal that surrounded his 2001 win of £1,000,000 on Who Wants to Be a Millionaire? and the subsequent court trial.

Charles Ingram, a major in the British Army, entered British quiz show Who Wants to Be a Millionaire? in September 2001. Suspicions arose during filming after coughing was heard loudly adjacent to the correct answers. A sound technician informed Celador CEO Paul Smith of their suspicions, with filming allowed to continue and the tapes reviewed after filming had completed. Ingram eventually won the million pounds, however upon reviewing the tapes and each cough heard, Ingram was accused of cheating by having his wife, Diana, and an accomplice, Tecwen Whittock, cough as Ingram announced the correct answer from the available choices. Ingram "refuted" the claims.

Following trial on 7 April 2003, a jury declared the Ingrams and Whittock guilty of procuring the execution of a valuable security by deception. The Ingrams were sentenced to an 18-month suspended sentence and a fine of £15,000 plus £10,000 for costs each. Whittock received a 12-month suspended sentence with a £10,000 fine plus a £7,500 costs order.

Graham was a teenager when Who Wants to Be a Millionaire? first appeared on British television in 1998 and became "fixated" by the subsequent trial and what he describes as the most "British crime in the history of the world." He later received a copy of the 2015 book Bad Show: The Quiz, the Cough, the Millionaire Major. It raised questions about the case and raised the possibility that Ingram was innocent of all charges and forms the basis of which Quiz was adapted. In February 2017, it was announced the play would premiere at the Minerva Theatre, part of the Chichester Festival Theatre. The play is directed by Daniel Evans, with movement direction by Naomi Said, design by Robert Jones, lighting design by Tim Lutkin, video design by Tim Reid and music and sound design by Ben and Max Ringham.

== Productions ==
=== Chichester ===
Quiz began previews at the Minerva Theatre, on 3 November 2017, with an official opening night on 10 November, running until 2 December. Due to demand the run was extended to 9 December 2017. Notable casting included Gavin Spokes and Stephanie Street as Charles and Diana Ingram, with Keir Charles playing Chris Tarrant.

=== West End ===
Following its premiere production the play transferred to the West End's Noël Coward Theatre where it began previews on 31 March 2018, with an official opening night on 10 April, booking for a limited period until 16 June. It was produced by William Village and Playful Productions and Chichester Festival Theatre. Sharon Ballard joined the original cast for the London run. Prior to the production transferring around 40% of the play was rewritten by Graham and on stage seating added to provide a more studio like environment for audiences. Explaining the extensive rewrite Graham explained that the changes were:

not because we weren't happy with what happened in Chichester, but you learn so much when you do a tryout for a show, so we streamlined the narrative, I reordered some of the structure, we had to think about a West End proscenium Victorian theatre, which is very different to a studio theatre in Chichester.

The audience are given the opportunity to act as the jury via electronic voting after each act, where they will have witnessed the arguments for the prosecution and the defence to decide whether Ingram was guilty.

The West End production was nominated for two Olivier Awards in 2019: Best New Comedy and Best Actor in a Supporting Role (Keir Charles).

=== UK and Ireland tour (2020) ===
Quiz was due to tour the UK and Ireland from August to November 2020; the tour was cancelled in 2020”,

=== UK tour (2023) ===
On 20 January 2023, it was announced that the production will return to Chichester at the Festival Theatre from 22 to 30 September 2023 before touring the UK, starring Rory Bremner as Chris Tarrant. The production will be directed by Daniel Evans and Sean Linnen, designed by Robert Jones and produced by Jonathan Church Productions and Wessex Grove by arrangement with William Village.

== TV adaptation ==
In 2019, filming began on a three-part TV series of the same name for ITV adapted from the play (written by and executive produced by Graham) to air in 2020, directed by Stephen Frears and starring Michael Sheen as Chris Tarrant, Matthew Macfadyen as Charles Ingram, Sian Clifford as Diana Ingram and Michael Jibson as Tecwen Whittock. The series was produced by Alice Pearse, and executive produced by Dan Winch, William Village, James Graham, Stephen Frears and Andy Harries.

== Principal roles and original cast ==
Character	Chichester / West End	2023 UK tour	ITV drama
Charles Ingram	Gavin Spokes	Lewis Reeves	Matthew Macfadyen
Diana Ingram	Stephanie Street	Charley Webb	Sian Clifford
Rachel da Costa	Sharon Ballard	Sukh Ojla	—N/a
Nicholas Hilliard QC	Paul Bazely	Leo Wringer	Nicholas Woodeson
Quizmaster / John de Mol	Paul Bazely	Leo Wringer	—N/a
Chris Tarrant	Keir Charles	Rory Bremner	Michael Sheen
Warm Up / Jim Bowen / Des O'Connor / Leslie Crowther	Keir Charles	Rory Bremner	—N/a
Paul Smith	Greg Haiste	Stefan Adegbola	Mark Bonnar
Paddy Spooner	Greg Haiste	Mark Benton	Jeremy Killick
Tecwen Whittock	Mark Meadows	Marc Antolin	Michael Jibson
Major General Roberts	Mark Meadows	Marc Antolin	—N/a
David Briggs	Mark Meadows	Jay Taylor	Elliot Levey
Adrian Pollock	Henry Pettigrew	Jay Taylor	Trystan Gravelle
Mark Burnett	Henry Pettigrew	Jay Taylor	—N/a
Lt Col Village	—N/a	—N/a	Geoffrey McGivern
David Liddiment	Jay Villiers	Mark Benton	Risteard Cooper
Judge Rivlin / DS Williamson / Elsie Tanner	Jay Villiers	Mark Benton	—N/a
Claudia Rosencrantz	Lizzie Winkler	Sukh Ojla	Aisling Bea
Ruth Settle	Lizzie Winkler	Sukh Ojla	Seraphina Beh
Production Manager / Alyn Morice	Lizzie Winkler	Stefan Adegbola	—N/a
Sonia Woodley QC	Sarah Woodward	Danielle Henry	Helen McCrory
Hilda Ogden	Sarah Woodward	Danielle Henry	—N/a
