= Sarah Woodward =

British actress

- Occupation: Actress
- Years active: 1983–present
- Children: 2
- Parent(s): Edward Woodward; Venetia Barrett
- Relatives: Tim Woodward (brother); Peter Woodward (brother); Michele Dotrice (stepmother)

Sarah Woodward is a British actress who won an Olivier Award in 1998 for Tom & Clem and was Tony nominated in 2000 for The Real Thing. Sarah is the daughter of actor Edward Woodward and his first wife, actress Venetia Barrett. She is sister of actor Tim Woodward, and actor, voice artist, and screenwriter Peter Woodward, and half-sister to actress Emily Woodward, whose mother is actress Michele Dotrice.

== Career ==
Woodward trained as an actress at RADA, graduating in 1983 with an Acting (RADA Diploma). She won the Bancroft Gold Medal at Rada, before joining the Royal Shakespeare Company, where she appeared in Antony Sher's Richard III, Kenneth Branagh's Henry V, Roger Rees' Hamlet, and Frances Barber's Camille.

She returned to the RSC in 1993, in The Venetian Twins, Murder in the Cathedral, Love's Labour's Lost, and The Tempest, the latter directed by Sam Mendes. She has worked with Mendes in many other plays, including London Assurance, with Paul Eddington (Chichester/Haymarket Theatre); The Sea with Judi Dench (Royal National Theatre); Kean, with Derek Jacobi (Old Vic/Toronto); and Habeas Corpus with Imelda Staunton, Brenda Blethyn, and Jim Broadbent (Donmar). She won the Olivier Award for best performance in a supporting role in 1998 for her role in Tom & Clem by Stephen Churchett, with Michael Gambon and Alec McCowen. She was also nominated for a Tony Award in 2000 for her role in the Donmar Warehouse production of Tom Stoppard's The Real Thing, which transferred to the Albery Theatre (now Noël Coward Theatre) and then Broadway.

== Credits ==
=== Film ===
Year	Title	Role	Director	Notes
1996	Cries of Silence	Young Dorrie	Avery Crounse	Also known as: "Sister Island". Elsian Pictures
1997	The House of Angelo	Elizabeth Angelo	Jim Goddard	BBC / Tripal Productions
2002	Close Your Eyes	Police Inspector Hilary Ash	Nick Willing	Original title: "Doctor Sleep". BBC Films / Kismet Film Company
2003	I Capture the Castle	Leda Fox-Cotton	Tim Fywell	BBC Films / Trademark Films
2003	Bright Young Things	Sister Clemency (uncredited)	Stephen Fry	The Film Consortium
2004	Charlie	Alison - Warehouse Secretary	Malcolm Needs	Enigma Pictures / Midas Films
2020	Supernova	Sue	Harry Macqueen	BBC Films / British Film Institute

=== Television ===
Year	Title	Role	Notes
1987	The Two of Us	Nicola	Episode: "Comparisons"
1988	Gems	Philippa Lyons	Series 3, 6 episodes
1988	The Bill	Fiona	Episode: "Personal Imports"
1991	The Case-Book of Sherlock Holmes	Edith Presbury	Episode: "The Creeping Man"
1992	Poirot	Jane Grey	Episode: "Death in the Clouds"
1992	Casualty	Jo Daniels	Episode: "Body and Soul"
1996	The Bill	Nina	Episode: "Overstepping the Mark"
1998	The Cater Street Hangman	Sarah Corde	TV film
2003	Final Demand	DS Brown	TV film
2003	Hear the Silence	Headmistress	TV film
2005	The Bill	CSE Pat Buchanan	2 episodes: "To Catch a Killer: Parts 2 & 3"
2006	New Tricks	Audiologist	Episode: "Bank Robbery"
2009	Kingdom	Head Teacher	Series 3, 1 episode
2009–2010	Doctors	Marion Smithson	2 episodes: "Someone to Watch Over Me" and "A Happy Ending"
2010	DCI Banks	Jessica Ford	2 episodes: "Aftermath: Parts 1 & 2"
2010	Law & Order: UK	DS Jemma Fraser	Episode: "Anonymous"
2012	Loving Miss Hatto	Birdy	TV film
2012	Outnumbered	Mary	Episode: Christmas Special 2012
2013	The Politician's Husband	Undercover Reporter 1	TV miniseries, 3 episodes
2014	Endeavour	Hazel Wintergreen	Episode: "Neverland"
2016	New Blood	Mrs Clayton	Episode: "Case 1, Part 1"
2019	Holby City	Lilly Gellar	Episode: "Work Life Balance"
2019–2021	Queens of Mystery	Beth Stone	9 episodes
2020	The Pale Horse	Clemency Ardingly	TV miniseries, 2 episodes
2020	Quiz	Maggie Pearce	TV miniseries, 1 episode
2020	Sitting in Limbo	Rhona	TV film
2021	Professor T.	Ingrid Snares	Series 1, 6 episodes
2022	Professor T.	Ingrid Snares	Series 2, 6 episodes
2022	Motherland		TV film, BBC2 - directed by Lucy Kirkwood
2023	Death in Paradise	Miriam Sworder	Series 12, Episode 1
2023	Silent Witness	Ch Supt Bridget Laing	Series 26, Episodes 9 and 10, "Southbay"
2023	Midsomer Murders	Ursula	ITV
2023	Professor T.	Ingrid Snares	Series 3, 6 episodes
2024–2026	House of the Dragon	Lady Sabitha Frey	4 episodes

=== Theatre ===
Year	Title	Role	Director	Notes
1994	The Tempest	Miranda	Sam Mendes	Royal Shakespeare Company
1996	Habeas Corpus	Connie Wicksteed	Sam Mendes	Donmar Warehouse
1997	Tom and Clem	Kitty	Richard Wilson	Aldwych Theatre Winner of the Olivier Award for Best Performance in a Supporting Role
1999–2000	The Real Thing by Tom Stoppard	Charlotte	David Leveaux	Donmar Warehouse and Broadway Nominated for a Tony Award
2001	Presence	Marian	James Kerr	Royal Court Theatre
2004	Much Ado About Nothing	Dogberry	Tamara Harvey	Shakespeare's Globe
2005	Woman in Mind	Susan	Raz Shaw	Salisbury Playhouse
2006	The Comedy of Errors	Adriana	Chris Luscombe	Shakespeare's Globe
2007	A Midsummer Night's Dream	Titania	Chris Luscombe	Regent's Park Open Air Theatre
2007	Macbeth	Lady Macbeth		Regent's Park Open Air Theatre
2008	Present Laughter	Monica	Howard Davies	National Theatre
2009	Judgment Day by Ödön von Horváth	Frau Leimgruber	James McDonald	Almeida Theatre
2009	Rookery Nook	Gertrude	Terry Johnson	Menier Chocolate Factory
2010	The Merry Wives of Windsor	Mistress Ford	Chris Luscombe	Shakespeare's Globe; Los Angeles; New York
2011	Jumpy by April De Angelis	Bea	Nina Raine	Royal Court Theatre
2011	The Cherry Orchard by Chekhov	Charlotta	Howard Davies	National Theatre
2011	Snake in the Grass	Miriam	Lucy Bailey	The Print Room
2012	Love and Information by Caryl Churchill	Various	James McDonald	Royal Court Theatre
2013	Bracken Moor by Alexi Kaye Campbell	Vanessa Avery	Polly Teale	Tricycle Theatre
2013–2014	In the Next Room by Sarah Ruhl	Annie	Laurence Boswell	St. James Theatre, London
2015	The Curious Incident of the Dog in the Night-Time	Siobhan	Marianne Elliott	Gielgud Theatre
2016	Nell Gwynn by Jessica Swale	Ma Gwynn / Queen Catherine	Chris Luscombe	Shakespeare's Globe Apollo Theatre, London
2016	Richard II	Duchess of York	Simon Godwin	Shakespeare's Globe
2017	Quiz by James Graham	Sonia Woodley, QC	Daniel Evans	Minerva Theatre, Chichester; Noël Coward Theatre, London
2017	This House by James Graham	Rochester & Chatham; Welwyn & Hatfield; Coventry South West; Ilford North; Lady Batley	Jeremy Herrin	Minerva Theatre; Garrick Theatre, London
2020	The Haystack	Hannah	Roxana Silbert	Hampstead Theatre, London
