= Making Music =

Making Music may refer to:

- Making Music (Bill Withers album), 1975
- Making Music, an album by Hi-5 released in 2005
- Making Music (Zakir Hussain album), 1987
- Making Music (magazine), a bi-monthly lifestyle music magazine
- Making Music (organisation)
- "Making Music", a song by Sophie Ellis-Bextor from her 2003 album Shoot from the Hip
- "Making Music", an episode of the television series Teletubbies

== See also ==
- The Making of Music, a BBC Radio 4 documentary series
