= Sian Clifford =

English actress (born 1982)

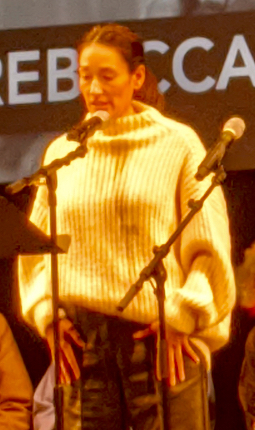
- Clifford in 2020
- Born: 7 April 1982 (age 44); London, England
- Occupation: Actress
- Years active: 2006–present

Sian Clifford (born 7 April 1982) is an English actress. She is best known for playing Claire, the older sister of the titular character in the BBC comedy-drama series Fleabag (2016–2019), Martha Crawley in the ITV/Amazon Studios series Vanity Fair (2018), and Diana Ingram in the ITV series Quiz (2020).

For the second season of Fleabag, Clifford won the BAFTA TV Award for Best Female Comedy Performance, and received a Primetime Emmy nomination for Outstanding Supporting Actress in a Comedy Series as well as a Critics' Choice nomination for Best Supporting Actress in a Comedy Series.

Her theatre credits include Consent at the Harold Pinter Theatre, Pains of Youth at the National Theatre, and The Road to Mecca at the Arcola Theatre.

== Early life ==
Clifford was born in London on 7 April 1982, the daughter of an executive assistant mother and a father who worked for the local council. She grew up in the London borough of Ealing. She has two brothers, Alex and Elliot, and a sister, Natalie, who is an art dealer in New York City.

Growing up, Clifford knew she wanted to be an actor and participated in youth theatre from the age of six. She hated school and saw theatre as an escape.

After school, Clifford worked for three years as a writing consultant before being accepted into Royal Academy of Dramatic Art (RADA) for a BA degree in acting, having been turned down twice previously. While attending RADA, she met her future co-star Phoebe Waller-Bridge early on and they became friends. The two "“made a silent pact” that if one of them became successful first, they’d “help the other one out”." She graduated from RADA in 2006.

== Career ==
=== 2006–2015: Early career and theatre ===
In the first ten years of her professional acting career, Clifford became a regular Off West End actress. In her first few years out of drama school, she was involved with Theatre503 in which she was involved the productions Without Laughing, Contraction, and Listening Out. In March 2007, she acted in the play Not the End of the World at the Bristol Old Vic theatre. Her first notable performance was playing Ismene in the Nottingham Playhouse production of Burial at Thebes at the Barbican, which premiered in September 2007.

In summer 2008, she acted in a play called The Pendulum, written by her co-star Alexander Fiske-Harrison, at the Jermyn Street Theatre in the West End, which ran for the month of June, and in the following month she took part in the annual Latitude Festival in the play Public Displays of Affection. Clifford was in three theatre productions the next summer: in June, she had a small role in a chamber opera titled Parthenogenesis at the Royal Opera House's Linbury Studio, she co-starred in the Arcola Theatre play The Road to Mecca, and she toured with the production Is Everyone Okay?, which co-starred future Fleabag castmate Phoebe Waller-Bridge.

Throughout September 2010, Clifford starred in the well-reviewed experimental theatre piece Pieces of Vincent at the Arcola Theatre. For the rest of autumn 2010, she had a supporting role in the play Pains of Youth at the Royal National Theatre. Finishing out the year, Clifford held the titular role in an original production of Beauty and the Beast, also at the Royal National Theatre. The production ran throughout the Christmas season and was critically successful.

In 2014, she was one of the cast of the Nottingham Playhouse's production of Time and the Conways. Also that year, she took part in Good. Clean. Fun., a collection of short plays by Phoebe Waller-Bridge, which includes an early version of Clifford's Fleabag character Claire, as well as the Victorian-era play Fever at the Jermyn Street Theatre. Clifford had previously played the role of Claire in a sketch of Waller-Bridge's called "Use Your Vote", which consisted of two sisters attending a feminist lecture, and Clifford reprised this role several times.

In 2015, Clifford started Still Space, a blog and platform where she shared information and thoughts about mindfulness and meditation. As part of this, she published an article in Psychologies Magazine and won the Hay House publishers' "New Wise Voice" award in 2016. Her last post (as of August 2026) was on 7 April 2024.

During her career, Clifford has also participated in many workshops and readings for Off West End productions. She has often collaborated with DryWrite and Nabokov theatre companies, theatre directors Vicky Jones (DryWrite), Lyndsey Turner (Royal National Theatre, Theatre503) and Andrew Steggall, and writer–actor Phoebe Waller-Bridge.

=== 2016–present: Fleabag, television, radio and theatre ===
In 2016, Clifford had her breakthrough screen acting role in Waller-Bridge's Fleabag, as Claire, Fleabag's uptight older sister. Waller-Bridge wrote the character of Claire with Clifford in mind, and Clifford said she fought the BBC to include her in the series, having wanted someone famous to fill the role. Fleabag returned in 2019. Clifford's performance in the show was widely praised and she was nominated for the Emmy Award for Supporting Actress in a Comedy Series and the Critics' Choice Award for Supporting Actress in a Comedy Series for her performance. In 2020, she won the BAFTA Television Award for Best Female Comedy Performance for the series. She was also nominated for the 2020 Screen Actors Guild Awards for Best Actress (which Waller-Bridge won).

In 2017, Clifford was part of the cast of the play Gloria at Hampstead Theatre, which was the play's Off West End premiere.

In 2018, Clifford had a recurring role in the ITV miniseries Vanity Fair and was in a production of Circle Mirror Transformation in Manchester.

Later in 2018, Clifford was part of the cast in the West End production of Consent at the Harold Pinter Theatre.

In 2019, Clifford had a small role in the independent dark comedy film A Serial Killer's Guide to Life. In 2020, Clifford had guest roles on the television shows Hitmen on Sky One and Liar. She starred as Diana Ingram opposite Matthew Macfadyen (who played Charles Ingram) in the April 2020 miniseries Quiz, based on the 2001Who Wants to Be A Millionaire? scandal. Clifford later co-starred in the Sky comedy series Two Weeks to Live.

In 2021, Clifford starred in the romantic comedy Good Grief, a hybrid of theatre and film produced in the context of the covid pandemic. It was written by Lorien Hayes, directed by Natalie Abrahami and featured music composed by Isobel Waller-Bridge.

In May 2021, Clifford appeared as Iris in the Inside No. 9 episode "Lip Service". In July 2021, Clifford voiced GS-8 in Star Wars: The Bad Batch.

In 2022, Clifford appeared in the BBC adaptation of Kate Atkinson's novel Life After Life. Clifford played Sylvia, the mother of the protagonist, Ursula Todd. She also starred in See How They Run, a murder mystery with Saoirse Ronan and Sam Rockwell, and His Dark Materials.

In July 2024, Clifford played journalist Chloe Slack in Time of the Week, a BBC Radio 4 comedy series. In March 2025, Clifford was nominated in the BBC Audio Drama Awards under Best Comedy Performance for her role in the show. The series returned for a second series in December 2025 to January 2026.

In 2024, Clifford appeared in series two of the Channel 4 comedy Everyone Else Burns as Maude. In the series, Maude, a new member of the Order, tries to tempt father and husband David away from his wife Fiona. The Guardian said that this storyline was "a reminder of why this style of sitcom fell out of fashion" and that "As a character and plot device, Maude – who has no intelligible backstory – feels hollow".

In 2025, Clifford led the cast of mockumentary Lady, which was eventually released in August 2026.

In September 2025, it was announced Clifford had joined the cast of BBC detective series Ludwig, playing local MP Joanne Kemper in the second series.

== Personal life ==
Clifford is a vegan and practises daily meditation. In 2016, she launched a digital wellness and meditation platform called Still Space.

== Filmography ==
=== Television ===
Year	Title	Channel	Role	Notes	Ref.
2012	Dark Matters: Twisted But True		Ida Thomas	Documentary series (Episode: "Agent Orange, Ben Franklin")	
2013	Midsomer Murders		PC Milton	Episode: "Schooled in Murder"	
2016–2019	Fleabag	BBC	Claire	2 series, 12 episodes	
2018	Vanity Fair		Martha Crawley	5 episodes	
2020	Hitmen		The Accountant	Episode: "Money"	
2020	Liar		Ruby Allen	Episode: "2.5"	
2020	Quiz	ITV	Diana Ingram	Miniseries, all episodes	
2020	Two Weeks to Live		Tina Noakes	6 episodes	
2021	Inside No. 9	BBC	Iris	Episode: "Lip Service"	
2021	Star Wars: The Bad Batch		GS-8 (voice)	Episode: "Common Ground"	
2021	Robot Chicken		Sigourney Weaver, Maleficent, Vicki Gunvalson (voice)	Episode: "May Cause Numb Butthole"	
2022	Life After Life		Sylvia Todd		
2022	His Dark Materials		Agent Salmakia	3 episodes	
2023	Unstable		Anna Bennet		
2024	Doctor Who		Kind Woman	Episode: "Empire of Death"	
2024	Everyone Else Burns	Channel 4	Maude	Series 2	
2026	Bait	Amazon Prime	Vivian	Episode: "To Troll, to Provoke"	
2026	Ludwig	BBC	Joanne Kemper MP	Series 2	
2026	The Miniature Wife	Peacock	Terry		
2026	The Reluctant Vampire	BBC	Valeeta	Series 1	

=== Film ===
Year	Title	Production	Role	Notes	Refs.
2014	Paddy		Meg	Short film	
2017	Fry-Up		Rosie	Short film	
2018	Dodgy Dave		Stephanie	Short film	
2018	White Lies		Mum	Short film	
2020	A Serial Killer's Guide to Life		Cynthia		
2020	The Duke		Dr. Unsworth		
2022	See How They Run		Edana Romney		
2022	Chevalier	Searchlight Pictures	Madame de Genlis		
2023	The Magician's Elephant	Netflix	Gloria Matienne (voice)		
2024	Young Woman and the Sea	Disney+	Charlotte		
2025	The Ballad of Wallis Island		Amanda		
2025	Lady		Lady Isabella		
2026	Mother Mary		Jade		
2026	Ghosts: The Possession of Button House		Janine		
TBA	Real Love		Sally		
