= The Miniature Wife =

2026 American television series

- Release poster
- Genre: Romantic comedy; Comedy drama; Science fiction
- Created by: Jennifer Ames; Steve Turner
- Based on: "The Miniature Wife" by Manuel Gonzales
- Starring: Elizabeth Banks; Matthew Macfadyen; O-T Fagbenle; Zoe Lister-Jones; Sofia Rosinsky; Sian Clifford; Aasif Mandvi
- Music by: Isobel Waller-Bridge
- Country of origin: United States
- Original language: English
- No. of seasons: 1
- No. of episodes: 10

Production
- Executive producers: Jennifer Ames; Steve Turner; Michael Aguilar; Michael Ellenberg; Lindsey Springer; Elizabeth Banks; Matthew Macfadyen; Greg Mottola; Suzanne Heathcote
- Cinematography: Adrian Peng Correia; Steve Cosens
- Editors: Heather Persons; Daysha Broadway; Trevor Ambrose; Curt Lobb
- Production companies: Sad Ice Cream Inc.; Media Res

Original release
- Network: Peacock
- Release: April 9, 2026

The Miniature Wife is a 2026 American science fiction romantic comedy drama television series created by Jennifer Ames and Steve Turner for Peacock. It is based on the 2013 short story by Manuel Gonzalez. The series stars Elizabeth Banks and Matthew Macfadyen and premiered on April 9, 2026.

== Premise ==
A married couple battle for power within their relationship, which is then complicated when a technological accident shrinks the wife to 6 inches (15 centimetres) tall.

== Cast and characters ==
=== Main ===
- Elizabeth Banks as Lindy Littlejohn, a best selling author who is accidentally shrunk down to 6 inches tall
- Matthew Macfadyen as Les Littlejohn, Lindy's husband and the creator of the miniaturization formula
- O-T Fagbenle as Richard, Les' co-worker and physicist who makes himself smaller to try and win over Lindy
- Zoe Lister-Jones as Vivienne, Hilton's chief scientist who takes over Les' lab under Hilton's order
- Sofia Rosinsky as Lulu Littlejohn, Lindy and Les's young adult daughter
- Sian Clifford as Terry, Lindy's book editor and best friend
- Aasif Mandvi as Martin Mucklowe, Les' business partner and best friend

=== Recurring ===
- Ronny Chieng as Hilton Smith, a billionaire who is funding the miniaturization project with his own agenda
- Rong Fu as Janet, Richard's colleague who has a crush on him
- Steven McCarthy as Nils, a reporter who wants to talk about the miniaturization project, but ends up being shrunk himself
- Tricia Black as Hel, the lawyer of Lindy's student
- Adam Capriolo as Oliver, Terry's assistant

== Production ==
=== Development ===
The comedy drama series received a straight-to-series order from Peacock in March 2024. It is created and executive produced by Jennifer Ames and Steve Turner who are showrunners on the series, which is adapted from the short story of the same name by Manuel Gonzales. Michael Ellenberg and Lindsey Springer are executive producers for Media Res. Greg Mottola directed the first two episodes, and is also an executive producer.

=== Casting ===
The cast is led by Matthew Macfadyen and Elizabeth Banks, who are also both executive producers on the series. In January 2025, they were joined in the cast by Zoe Lister-Jones, Sofia Rosinsky, O-T Fagbenle, and Sian Clifford as series regulars and Ronny Chieng in a recurring role. In March 2025, Aasif Mandvi, Rong Fu and Tricia Black joined the cast in recurring roles.

=== Filming ===
Principal photography took place in Toronto, Ontario from January 2025 with a schedule to last through the spring of 2025 into July.

== Episodes ==
No.	Title	Directed by	Teleplay by	Original release date
1	"Lady Tomato And Mr. F. Tomato-Head"	Greg Mottola	Jennifer Ames & Steve Turner	April 9, 2026
Lindy and Les Littlejohn are a struggling married couple looking to repair their relationship. Les is working on a miniaturization project and seeking funding from billionaire Hilton Smith. Lindy, a professor and Pulitzer-award winning author, has been having an emotional affair with Les' work partner Richard, but cuts things off to work on fixing things with Les. She then finds out Richard sent in one of her students' short stories to the New Yorker under her own name, and relies on her publicist Terry to cover up the issue. At a charity auction at their home, Lindy unknowingly vents to Hilton about Les' work obsession, and Hilton is convinced to invest. Les decides to cancel their plans to renew their vows on New Years' Eve, so a distraught Lindy decides to run away with Richard. When Les learns Hilton will become significantly more involved in the project, he takes the miniaturization truck home with him. Lindy reveals her intention to leave and the two have a heated argument over neither supporting each other in their respective fields. The miniaturization truck is accidentally activated, and when Lindy picks it up, it sprays the formula over her, shrinking her down to 6 inches tall.
2	"Merry Christmas, Lindy!"	Greg Mottola	Jennifer Ames & Steve Turner & Marisa Wegrzyn; Television story by : Jennifer Ames & Steve Turner & Marisa Wegrzyn	April 9, 2026
Lindy wakes up inside of a dollhouse recreation of their own home filled with miniaturized objects, having an emotional breakdown as she struggles to converse with the giant Les. He attempts to relieve her fears of her new size by showing her around the house and providing everything she might need, which she reluctantly accepts. Les learns from his work partner Martin that due to the new deal signed by Hilton, if they don't perfect the formula in 30 days, the patent will revert to him, and Les will be sued and go to jail; currently every growth attempt results in an immediate explosion. Vivienne, Hilton's chief scientist, arrives and declares her intention at working directly with the lab. Lindy attempts to adapt to living in the dollhouse, but is eventually driven mad and breaks out, being knocked off the desk by a fly and nearly falling into the path of an oncoming Roomba.
3	"What Category Is Shrinking Your Wife"	Bertie Elwood	Vivian Barnes; Television story by : Vivian Barnes	April 9, 2026
Lindy wakes back up in the dollhouse, having been saved from the fall by Les, who has once again locked her in for her own safety. She decides to indulge in all of the luxuries he has put in there for her, however soon notices the stockpile of resources, indicating she will be stuck in there indefinitely. Hindered by Vivienne's protocols, Les proposes a direct partnership with her, and after he reveals he tested the formula on his cat, Mr. Magoo, she is impressed and agrees to help. When he temporarily returns home, Lindy sneaks out of the dollhouse and stows away back to the lab. She also overhears a conversation between Les and their daughter Lulu, who is home from college for winter break, speaking negatively about her. Lindy witnesses a growth experiment at the lab, which while lasting longer still results in an explosion, forcing Les to confess he has no idea when it will be ready. She uses Les' phone to call Terry for updates on the incoming plagiarist scandal, and then Richard to inform him about her shrinking. That night, Vivienne puts Les on a list of her "potential life partners". The next day, Lindy is surprised by the sudden arrival of a shrunken Richard.
4	"Don't Freak Out!"	Bertie Elwood	Hiram Martinez; Television story by : Hiram Martinez	April 9, 2026
Lindy and Les have a talk over coffee about how to tell Lulu about the shrinking. After Les leaves, Richard uses a shrunken mo-ped to drive him and Lindy around the house as they stake out in the Christmas toy village. Terry attempts to buy off Jackie, the student who Lindy accidentally plagiarized, but the story is published and Jackie reveals she is aware of the situation. Hilton arrives at the lab, disturbing Les' progress; he is secretly comforted by Vivienne, where he shares in his marital troubles. When Lindy learns Richard has no plan to escape, she storms off alone, where she is once again attacked by the fly, eventually succeeding in killing it. Lulu reconnects with an old friend of hers, and at a bar drunkenly lashes out at everyone, feeling insecure of herself due to her mom's writing. Les returns home to find Lindy disappeared, with his "Don't Freak Out" sticky note left in front of the dollhouse with the dead fly.
5	"Delusional"	Fernando Frias	Suzanne Heathcote; Television story by : Suzanne Heathcote	April 9, 2026
While hiding out from Les in the Christmas village, Lindy turns on her phone and is met with non-stop notifications praising her for her "publication", which she is overjoyed to hear. Despite Terry's warnings, she is convinced by Richard into hastily accepting an interview with the Today Show. Les is forced to cover up Lindy's absence when his mother arrives to visit; Lulu reveals to her that she flunked out of college and has no interest in science like Les assumes she does. Les learns from one of his co-workers, Bob, about Hilton's previous experiences of buying out tech and cutting the creators' out. Vivienne suggests using a sample of Mr. Magoo's gene tissue to try and resolve the growing procedure, leading to further sexual tension growing between them. After finally reading Lindy's book, and getting second thoughts on her feelings on her mother, Lulu watches Lindy give an interview on the Today Show, seemingly from her office; when she investigates, she finds Jackie's paper. Les' mother spots the tiny Lindy and faints, forcing him to lie to her again. Angered by the constant lies she fires back at him and leaves, imploring him to be honest for once. Les sends an audio message to Lindy confessing he intentionally shrunk her to prevent her from leaving, devastating her even more.
6	"Happy New Year, Les!"	Fernando Frias	Noelle Valdivia	April 9, 2026
On New Years' Eve, Les is forcefully invited by Hilton to attend a party at his place. Lindy sends a voice message back to Les, seemingly forgiving him, however when he returns home he finds her gleefully taunting him in the dollhouse after supposedly having slept with Richard. In a rage, he tosses Richard in their budgie cage and shuts down the power to the dollhouse. Lindy breaks free, but finds both Richard and the budgie missing. On her phone she is met with an onslaught of criticism after Lulu releases a TikTok revealing Lindy's plagiarizing. At Hilton's party, Les is forced into performing a demonstration of the formula, and lured into the potential of gaining a Nobel Prize, successfully pulls it off and hides the explosive reaction. Lindy learns as a result of the scandal, the Pulitzer committee is considering revoking her award. She also learns Richard survived, being forced to kill the budgie, and is now disgusted by Lindy for being used to get back at Les. He hides out on his own and uses a shrunken laptop to get in contact with co-worker Janet. Les feels guilty regarding Lindy and Richard's disappearance, only to witness the dollhouse burning down. A maniacal Lindy declares she's content being tiny and will devote her time to making Les' life a living hell. Meanwhile, Vivenne shrinks Nils, a reporter snooping around Les, and traps him in a terrarium.
7	"Hurricane Les"	Greg Mottola	Marisa Wegrzyn; Television story by : Marisa Wegrzyn	April 9, 2026
Lindy takes control of the speaker and light system in the house through her phone, endlessly taunting and torturing Les. At the lab, Martin warns him that Hilton has pushed up an investor showcase to the following day. Jackie appears on the Today Show, and surprisingly gives Lindy credit for the work. As a result, despite her initial virality, Lulu is now met with a barrage of hate comments. Les spirals at work unable to think straight and is comforted by Vivienne. Lindy calls Lulu to apologize and she discovers her mom tiny, with the two reconciling all the misunderstandings between each other. Les returns home, leading to another argument with Lulu now blaming him for Lindy's state. After Lulu leaves, believing he's the one who now has lost his daughter's love, Les retaliates by threatening to flush Lindy down the toilet, and she escapes. While Les buries the budgie, Richard reveals himself, confirming he and Lindy never actually slept together, and the two make up as they start brainstorming new ways to fix the formula.
8	"Gone into the Heart of Darkness"	Greg Mottola	Neda Jebelli & Hiram Martinez	April 9, 2026
Les barricades himself in his flooded bedroom to try and solve the restoration formula, while Lindy does everything she can to break in and disrupt his process. Richard tries to stop and convince her, but she refuses to let him be rewarded for his actions. While Les tries to sleep, Lindy stabs him in the eye, and then baits him into another confrontation. Later, Lulu calls Lindy about feeling unsure continuing with science in college, and with her advice is convinced to quit. Martin reveals to Les that Hilton intends to sell the shrinking formula to the military and pleads with him not to give them the restoration. High on his obsession with the Nobel, and thinking about Lindy, Les succeeds in stabilizing the growth. After Lindy threatens to publicly reveal her shrinking, inspired by Vivenne's words, Les sics an enlarged Mr. Magoo on her. He then goes out to dinner with Vivienne, but she is turned off by his growing ego and obsession over Lindy. He is fired and kicked out of the lab, and after a manic episode finally admits to Martin he needs the Nobel to feel worthy of Lindy. While hiding from Mr. Magoo with Lindy, Richard starts to ask what drives her to Les, only to be carried away by the cat.
9	"Janet Reno"	Miguel Arteta	Suzanne Heathcote & Jennifer Ames & Steve Turner; Television story by : Suzanne Heathcote & Jennifer Ames & Steve Turner	April 9, 2026
Twenty years in the past, after Lindy's book is approved for publication, Les and Lindy agree to get married, despite the latter initially being apprehensive of the idea. Their small non-conformist wedding soon balloons into a massive event, with Lindy particularly being controlling and worried about how her mother, Diane, will act. At the rehearsal dinner, due to a delay in food, more cocktails are distributed and the mood becomes increasingly uncomfortable. Lindy is excited when her birth father Jim appears, but a drunken Diane ends up angrily reading a passage from Lindy's book, where her expy is characterized extremely unflatteringly. This escalates into a violent scuffle that results in Jim and Les getting stabbed with a knife. Later, Les catches Lindy accidentally saying she only wanted to get married to join his "normal family", and the two start having second thoughts; Lindy has a talk with Jim, and Les has a talk with Diane. On the wedding day, Les and Lindy decide to run away together, where they confess their true desires and feelings for each other, ultimately deciding to marry in a private location away from their families.
10	"A Tiny Big Idea"	Miguel Arteta	Noelle Valdivia & Hiram Martinez & Jennifer Ames & Steve Turner; Television story by : Noelle Valdivia & Hiram Martinez & Jennifer Ames & Steve Turner	April 9, 2026
Lindy succeeds in saving Richard from Mr. Magoo. Les reveals to Lindy she needs to break into the lab to retrieve the growth formula, as well as wipe the servers before it can be sold to the military. She reluctantly agrees, but rejects Les' proposal to return to their normal lives once she's big, believing they are bad for each other. Lulu watches a TikTok by Lindy where she confesses to the plagiarism, defending Lulu, and rescinding her Pulitzer. Les and Martin sneak Lindy in a pizza to Janet still in the lab, only to find the growth vials missing, and an armada of tanks and missiles already shrunken. Les plans to sneak into the lab, create a new batch to grow Lindy, and then will blow up the building with the thermal storage tank, sacrificing his legacy. With the formula equation no longer in the system, Les is forced to rely on an incomplete recreation he wrote on his bedroom walls. As they all prepare to flee, Lindy is found and caught by Vivienne, leading to a scuffle where the vials are kicked down an elevator shaft, and Vivienne is tased by Lindy. Les shrinks himself and joins Lindy to retrieve the vials, and they escape just as the lab explodes. Unsure of the formula's accuracy, Les tests it on himself first, and he survives the stabilization period; Lulu uses this chance to tell her father she dropped out of college. Lindy is grown and after properly reuniting, they agree to start over with their relationship; Lindy reveals she has a new idea for a book called "The Miniature Wife". Meanwhile, Nils, revealed to have escaped the lab, is found on the street by Les and Lindy's friends, and Vivienne.

== Release ==
The series premiered on April 9, 2026, on Peacock.

== Reception ==
On the review aggregator website Rotten Tomatoes, the series holds an approval rating of 72% based on 25 reviews. The website's critics consensus reads, "Packing big performances by Banks and Macfadyen, The Miniature Wife's premise risks running out of steam, but it keeps the laughs coming and manages not to shrink under pressure." Metacritic, which uses a weighted average, gave a score of 59 out of 100 based on 12 critics, indicating "mixed or average" reviews.
