= The Lighthouse (2016 film) =

Film by Chris Crow

- Directed by: Chris Crow
- Written by: Paul Bryant; Chris Crow; Michael Jibson
- Produced by: David Lloyd
- Starring: Mark Lewis Jones; Michael Jibson; Ian Virgo
- Cinematography: Alex Metcalfe
- Edited by: John Gillanders
- Music by: Mark Rutherford
- Production companies: Soda Pictures; Edicis Films; S4C; BBC Films; Ffilm Cymru Wales; British Film Institute; Dogs Of Annwn Films
- Distributed by: Soda Pictures
- Release dates: 8 July 2016 (United Kingdom); 6 July 2018 (United States)
- Running time: 102 minutes
- Country: United Kingdom
- Language: English

The Lighthouse is a 2016 British psychological thriller drama film directed by Chris Crow and written by Paul Bryant, Chris Crow and Michael Jibson. The film is based on the Smalls Lighthouse incident which occurred in 1801.

== Plot ==
In 1801, Thomas Howell and Thomas Griffith are stationed at the Smalls Island Lighthouse, which is located 25 miles west from the Welsh Coast in the Irish Sea.

After a severe sea storm leaves the two men stranded at the remote lighthouse without aid, they begin to develop cabin fever and must fight for their lives and their sanity.

== Cast ==
- Mark Lewis Jones as Thomas Griffiths
- Michael Jibson as Thomas Howell

== Release ==
The film was released in the United Kingdom on 8 July 2016 and in the United States on 6 July 2018.

== Critical reception ==
The film has a 71% critical rating on Rotten Tomatoes with seven reviews. James Berardinelli of Reelviews gave the film a positive review stating "the high production values, excellent acting, and strong writing make this a cut above what is often accorded this sort of release pattern". Noel Murray of The Los Angeles Times gave the film a positive review stating, "Jones and Jibson (the latter of whom also worked on the script) play this material like an intimate theatre piece, finding the finer nuances in their characters' simmering animosity". Frank Scheck of The Hollywood Reporter described the film as "tensely atmospheric" and "benefits immeasurably from the powerful performances by Jones and Jibson". Guy Lodge of Variety gave the film a negative review stating the film is "a bleak nugget of Welsh maritime history [which] is given a Gothic spin by British filmmaker Chris Crow, to resolute but less-than-gripping effect".
