= Michael Jibson =

English actor (born 1980)

- Born: 16 December 1980 (age 45); Kingston upon Hull, East Riding of Yorkshire, England
- Education: Guildford School of Acting (BA Hons)
- Occupations: Actor, director, writer
- Years active: 1995–present
- Spouse: Caroline Sheen (m. 2008)
- Children: 1

Michael Jibson (born 16 December 1980) is an English actor, director, writer, and voice over artist. He was the winner of the 2018 Laurence Olivier Award for Best Actor in a Supporting Role in a Musical, for his role of King George III in Hamilton. He was nominated for the 2003 Laurence Olivier Award for Best Actor in a Musical, for Our House.

His many film appearances include roles in Flyboys (2006), The Bank Job (2008), Panic Button (2011), Les Misérables (2012), Beauty and the Beast (2017), Star Wars: The Last Jedi (2017), 1917 (2019), and Last Night in Soho (2021). His television work includes Quiz (2020), Four Lives, No Return, The Essex Serpent, The Crown (all 2022), Bodies and The Reckoning (2023).

In 2022, Michael was awarded an Honorary Doctor of Letters (Hon DLitt) by the University of Hull, in recognition of his exceptional contributions to culture, the arts, and society in Hull and East Yorkshire.

== Early life ==
Jibson was born in Kingston upon Hull, and was raised in Hessle, East Riding of Yorkshire, England, and attended Hessle High School. His father, Tim Jibson, was a radio director, his mother Evelyn is a retired receptionist. His brother, Paul Jibson is an actor/director and producer.

He made his West End debut at the age of 14 in as a member of Fagin's Gang in Oliver! at the London Palladium, directed by Sam Mendes. He went on to join the National Youth Music Theatre, of which he is now a patron. He later trained at the Guildford School of Acting, where he obtained a BA Hons (Musical Theatre) degree in 2002.

== Career ==
=== Theatre ===
In 2003, when Jibson was 22, he was nominated for a Laurence Olivier Award for Best Actor in a Musical, for his performance as Joe Casey in the Madness/Tim Firth musical Our House, directed by Matthew Warchus.

Other theatre work includes Brighton Rock at the Almeida Theatre, playing the lead role of Pinkie Brown, directed by Michael Attenborough in 2004. He played various roles in the Royal Shakespeare Company's adaptation of The Canterbury Tales. He played the role of Charles Lindbergh in Take Flight at the Menier Chocolate Factory in 2007. (nominated for a Theatregoer's Choice award for Best Supporting Actor in a Musical). He played the dual roles of Puck and Philostrate in A Midsummer Night's Dream directed by Jonathan Munby at Shakespeare's Globe in 2008, where he also appeared as the Painter in Timon of Athens directed by Lucy Bailey. He played Dromio of Syracuse in Roxana Silbert's production of A Comedy of Errors at the Manchester Royal Exchange Theatre in 2010.

He returned to the Menier Chocolate Factory in 2011, where he played Addison Mizner in the European premiere of Stephen Sondheim and John Weidman's Road Show, directed by John Doyle. He played Jimmy in Roots at the Donmar Warehouse in 2013, directed by James Macdonald.

He played the role of King George III in the original London cast of Hamilton, winning the 2018 Laurence Olivier Award for Best Actor in a Supporting Role in a Musical.

In 2023, it was announced that Jibson would play Victor Creel in the original West End cast of Stranger Things: The First Shadow, directed by Stephen Daldry, a play based on the hit Netflix series Stranger Things.

In 2025, Jibson played Steve opposite Gemma Whelan in Tim Firth's ‘’This Is My Family’’, in its London premiere at the Southwark Playhouse, directed by Vicky Featherstone.

=== Film ===
Jibson's film work includes Flyboys (2006), The Bank Job (2008), Lecture 21 (also titled Lesson 21) (2008), Red Mist (2009), Devils Bridge, Cemetery Junction, Panic Button, the factory foreman in the film version of Les Misérables, A Viking Saga: The Darkest Day, Hammer of the Gods, The Fifth Estate, Good People, The Riot Club, Beauty and the Beast, Star Wars: The Last Jedi (2017), Hunter Killer (2018), 1917 (2019), To Olivia (2021) and Last Night in Soho (2021) .

In 2014, Jibson co-wrote the independent film The Lighthouse, based the tragic story of the Smalls Lighthouse in 1801, starring as Thomas Howell opposite Welsh actor Mark Lewis Jones.

=== Television ===
Jibson's television work includes Phamer McCoy in the 2012 Primetime Emmy Awards winning 2012 US miniseries Hatfields & McCoys, directed by Kevin Reynolds and starring Kevin Costner and Bill Paxton, BBC Four film Burton & Taylor, alongside Helena Bonham Carter and Dominic West; The Thirteenth Tale starring Vanessa Redgrave and Olivia Colman – both for the BBC, Tubby and Enid, directed by Victoria Wood for the BBC, Father Brown for the BBC and Galavant for ABC.

In 2015, Jibson received rave reviews for portraying the English military officer Myles Standish in Saints & Strangers, a US TV movie for the National Geographic Channel and Sony Pictures. The Hollywood Reporter reviewer wrote: "The mini's MVP, however, is Michael Jibson as the Pilgrims' iconic military adviser, Myles Standish. His commanding performance strikes just the right balance between the mythical and the credible, as if he somehow instilled an animatronic Disneyland automaton with a stirringly virile essence". Saints & Strangers chronicled the real story of the Pilgrims, including their harrowing voyage from England to America aboard the Mayflower and settling in Plymouth, Massachusetts.

In 2020, Jibson played Tecwen Whittock in James Graham's television series Quiz, directed by Stephen Frears.

In 2021, Jibson portrayed the infamous Rudolf II in the second season of Sky One's television drama A Discovery of Witches. Jibson played DS Stuart Reeves in the 2020 miniseries Honour which was based on the real life murder of Banaz Mahmod. After that, 2021 saw him portray Cary Hemings in season 2 of Sky One's political thriller Cobra.

In 2022, Jibson played DC Paul Slaymaker in Four Lives for the BBC. It received positive reviews and Hugo Rifkind in The Times wrote, "All of the cast were strong, but Michael Jibson deserves particular credit as a hopelessly obstructive family liaison officer. The human embodiment of computer says 'no'." The same year, Jibson also played Matthew Evansford in the Apple TV+ mini series The Essex Serpent, starring Claire Danes and Tom Hiddleston, which was directed by Clio Barnard. Later that year, Jibson played Martin Powell opposite Sheridan Smith in the four-part ITV drama No Return, written by Danny Brocklehurst. The series follows a British family whose holiday in Turkey becomes a nightmare when their teenage son is arrested and accused of sexual assault, forcing his parents to navigate an unfamiliar foreign legal system. The Radio Times awarded the drama four out of five stars and described it as a thriller that would “keep parents up at night”, while The Independent noted Jibson’s portrayal of Martin as a husband struggling with his powerlessness and increasing sense of emasculation as the family disintegrates.

In 2023, Jibson played Bill Cotton in the BBC miniseries The Reckoning, starring Steve Coogan as Jimmy Savile. Also in 2023 Jibson played DCI Barber in the hit Netflix limited series Bodies, starring Stephen Graham.

== Personal life ==
Jibson is married to fellow actor Caroline Sheen, cousin of actor Michael Sheen. The couple have one daughter.

== Filmography ==
=== Film ===
Year	Title	Role	Notes
2006	Flyboys	Lyle Porter	
2008	The Bank Job	Eddie Burton	
2008	Lecture 21	Musician	
2008	Red Mist	Steve	
2010	Devils Bridge	Adam	
2010	Cemetery Junction	Cliff	
2011	Panic Button	Dave	
2012	Les Misérables	Foreman	
2013	Hammer of the Gods	Grim	
2013	The Fifth Estate	Irritated Reporter	
2013	The Physician	Stratford Monk	
2014	Good People	Mike Calloway	
2014	The Riot Club	Michael	
2016	The Lighthouse	Thomas Howell	Also writer and associate producer
2017	Beauty and the Beast	Tavern Keeper	
2017	Star Wars: Episode VIII - The Last Jedi	Jober Tavson	
2018	Hunter Killer	Reed	
2019	1917	Lieutenant Hutton	
2021	To Olivia	Pete Perkins	
2021	Last Night in Soho	Male Detective	
2025	Largo	Coastguard	Short film
2026	Rule, Britannia	Walshy	Short film

=== Television ===
Year	Title	Role	Notes
2001	Station Jim	Telegraph Boy	TV film
2005	Casualty	PC Gavin Burrows	Episode: "Animals"
2012	Hatfields & McCoys	Phamer McCoy	2 episodes
2013	Burton and Taylor	Mike	TV film
2013	The Thirteenth Tale	Charlie Angelfield	TV film
2014	That Day We Sang	Man with gramophone	TV film
2015	Galavant	Joustmaster	Episode: "Joust Friends"
2015	Father Brown	Martin Wheeler	Episode: "The Paradise of Thieves"
2015	DCI Banks	Lewis Hargreaves	2 episodes
2015	The Last Kingdom	Osric	Episode: #1.8
2015	Saints & Strangers	Myles Standish	2-part miniseries
2017	The Alienist	Dr. Fuller	Episode: "The Boy on the Bridge"
2018	Trauma	DS Carl Harris	Episode: #1.1
2020	Quiz	Tecwen Whittock	All 3 episodes
2020	Isolation Stories	Adrian	Episode: "Ron & Russell"
2020	Honour	DS Stuart Reeves	2-part TV series
2021	A Discovery of Witches	Emperor Rudolf II	Episode: #2.7
2021	COBRA	Cary Hemmings	2 episodes
2022	Four Lives	DC Paul Slaymaker	All 3 episodes
2022	No Return	Martin Powell	All 4 episodes
2022	The Essex Serpent	Matthew Evansford	All 6 episodes
2022	The Crown	Steve Hewlett	2 episodes
2023	The Reckoning	Bill Cotton	All 3 episodes
2023	Bodies	DCI Jack Barber	7 episodes
2024	The Mallorca Files	Ned	Episode: "All That Glisters"
