= Martin Flood =

Australian quiz show contestant

Martin Flood is an Australian quiz show contestant who competed and won on the show Who Wants to Be a Millionaire?, and participated in the short-lived program The Master. Flood was an I.T. analyst for Westpac bank at the time of winning Millionaire. He lives in New South Wales and retired from working altogether six months after the big win.

Harbouring an ambition to become a quiz champion, he studied general knowledge intensively for five years before appearing on the show, collecting information from trivia nights and also analysing past episodes of the show.

== Who Wants to Be a Millionaire? ==
Flood was the second person to win the $1,000,000 major prize on the Australian version of Who Wants to Be a Millionaire?, after Rob Fulton. He won the prize on the 14 November 2005 episode. He answered the question only after using his final lifeline, the 50/50.

$1,000,000 (15 of 15) - no time limit

Who was never 'Time' magazine's 'Man of the Year'?

1. Adolf Hitler(answer was eliminated either using the 50:50 lifeline or by choosing it while using the Double Dip lifeline)
2. Ayatollah Khomeini
3. Joseph Stalin(answer was eliminated either using the 50:50 lifeline or by choosing it while using the Double Dip lifeline)
4. Mao Zedong(correct answer)

Flood was the last winner of the original incarnation of Who Wants to Be a Millionaire? in Australia. Six further contestants, who then appeared on the Hot Seat edition of the show, attempted to succeed him as Australia's Millionaire, and all six failed (the most recent of which was Kevin Short in 2013). That was until 2016, however, when Edwin Daly, a 67-year-old retiree from South Australia, managed to correctly answer the fifteenth and final question for the first time in almost 11 years.

=== Controversy ===
Flood's appearance on the show spawned some controversies, as it was marred by suggestions that he may have cheated. The program launched an investigation following complaints from audience members about coughing in the audience. The Nine Network's A Current Affair focused on a moment when an audience member coughed as Flood mentioned an answer (creating links to convicted British quiz show cheat Charles Ingram) and on suggestions that Flood was behaving erratically. Flood, who was unaware of the suggestion until after taping the second episode on which he appeared, was publicly cleared by the network of any improper conduct.

== The Master ==
Flood was a key member of Australian quiz show The Master, which aired on the Seven Network on 16 August 2006, but which was cancelled after the first episode. Flood played the role of "The Master", competing against contestants to thwart their attempts to win a $1 million prize. The show was brought back in December (after the 2006 ratings period had ended) with the six remaining produced episodes going to air at an earlier timeslot of Monday nights at 7:30 p.m. (which The Weakest Link had previously occupied from 2001 to early 2002).

== Australia's Brainiest Quizmaster ==
Flood also participated in this special show which was part of a series spin-off of Australia's Brainiest but did not make it past the second round. The show aired on 19 February 2006.

Preceded by Rob "Coach" Fulton	Top Prize Winner on Who Wants to Be a Millionaire (Australian Version); 14 November 2005	Succeeded by Edwin Daly (Hot Seat version)
