= Claudia Rosencrantz =

British television executive and journalist (born 1959)

Claudia Rosencrantz FRTS
- Born: Claudia Emma Rosencrantz; 23 June 1959 (age 66)
- Occupations: Television executive, journalist
- Employer(s): ITV (1995–2005); Virgin Media Television (2006–2011)
- Spouse: Daniel Abineri
- Children: 1 daughter

Claudia Emma Rosencrantz FRTS (born 23 June 1959) is a British television executive and journalist. She was formerly the Controller of Entertainment for ITV, for over ten years. She was also Director of Television for Virgin Media for five years and worked with Jamie Oliver, including as CEO of the Jamie Oliver Media Group.

Series she commissioned for ITV included Who Wants to Be a Millionaire?, Pop Idol, I'm a Celebrity, Get Me Out of Here!, Hell's Kitchen, The X Factor, Ant and Dec's Saturday Night Takeaway, Love Island and Britain's Got Talent. In the official UK top ten most watched TV shows of the 2000s decade, four of the entries are Rosencrantz's commissions.

In April 2020, Rosencrantz was portrayed by Aisling Bea in the television adaptation of the West End play Quiz, commissioned by ITV.

== Early career ==
Rosencrantz began her career in Fleet Street in 1979, where she worked first as a picture editor and then as a journalist on various publications, including The Daily Telegraph Sunday magazine and Elle, before opting to become a television producer in 1986.

Her production credits include executive producer of Don't Forget Your Toothbrush, working with Elton John to produce Elton John: Tantrums & Tiaras and the drama Prisoners in Time (starring John Hurt, based on Eric Lomax's book The Railway Man) for the BBC.

Rosencrantz also produced Barry Humphries Dame Edna Everage's shows for ten years, including winning the Golden Rose of Montreux in 1991. She was one of the first UK producers to produce the Dame Edna Everage specials for the networks in the United States. In 2019 she produced Barry’s final Dame Edna tv show Dame Edna Rules The Waves for the BBC

=== ITV ===
Rosencrantz joined ITV in 1995 with responsibility for commissioning around 500 hours of prime-time entertainment programming a year, encompassing variety and talk shows, music specials and game shows. Her first major breakthroughs were Who Wants to Be a Millionaire?, Popstars and Pop Idol, which "changed the fortunes" not only of ITV but of two of the biggest US networks, ABC and Fox. Her next generation of entertainment events, I'm a Celebrity, Get Me Out of Here!, Hell's Kitchen, The X Factor and Ant and Dec's Saturday Night Takeaway remain some of ITV's highest rated shows. She is credited with shifting presenters Ant & Dec from children's television to an entertainment double act for a general audience, and for putting Simon Cowell on television.

She was also responsible for running ITV's entertainment talent roster – a list that included Cowell, Ant & Dec, Chris Tarrant, Michael Parkinson, Sharon Osbourne, Paul O'Grady, Gordon Ramsay, Davina McCall, and Harry Hill. Before her departure at the end of 2005, she had also commissioned Soapstar Superstar, Dancing on Ice, Love Island, Harry Hill's TV Burp and Britain's Got Talent which have all proved successful for ITV.

In 2002 Rosencrantz was awarded Woman of The Year at the Women in Film & Television Awards

=== VMTV ===
In April 2006 Rosencrantz was appointed director of programming for Living TV, which she re-branded as LIVING, LIVING 2 and FTN. In 2007 she became Director of Television for Virgin Media Television (VMTV), taking over responsibility for the creative strategy for all the channels across the portfolio, including Living TV, Bravo, Challenge and Trouble. She launched Virgin 1 in October 2007 and re-positioned Bravo in 2009. She became part of the management team that ran the company.

When Rosencrantz joined Living TV, the channel had already broadcast Jade's Salon, featuring Jade Goody, a contestant in the third series of Big Brother, and was in production with a second series, Just Jade, following Goody as she launched a perfume range. Then in the autumn of 2006 came Jade's PA and then Bigg Boss, the Indian version of Big Brother, in August 2008. Goody heard the diagnosis of her terminal condition, cervical cancer, on screen. The series of documentaries broadcast leading up to Jade's Wedding, transmitted on 12 March, brought the highest ratings in the history of the Livings channel.

In 2009 VMTV enjoyed a successful year, in which Living TV commissioned the series Four Weddings, Dating in the Dark and Living with My Idol featuring Pamela Anderson and David Hasselhoff, among others.

In 2010 Living received up the RTS Award for the series Dating in the Dark. It also won the Broadcast Award for Four Weddings. Living also made the supermodel Elle Macpherson the host on the series Britain's Next Top Model.

Rosencrantz was responsible for commissioning Living's first original drama, Bedlam starring Will Young and Theo James, which was taken into a second series.

In 2010, Virgin Media sold their portfolio of Virgin channels to BSkyB for £160 million. Living was renamed Sky Living, alongside the new channel Sky Atlantic. Journalist Maggie Brown of The Guardian broke the story that Rosencrantz had decided to leave post-integration of the channels as she felt there was no suitable role for her in the new structure at Sky.

On Rosencrantz's departure, the Virgin chief executive was quoted as saying:

Claudia is the real deal. She's made Living a glossy, premium destination for A-list talent and true break-out hits. She has the courage and critical eye to back an original idea, combined with the clarity and drive to create real commercial success. Claudia has transformed the channels, and has done so with her trademark package of unerring grace and wicked wit.

== With Jamie Oliver ==
In October 2012, Rosencrantz joined the celebrity chef Jamie Oliver as Director of Programmes of Fresh One Productions and CCO of the Jamie Oliver Media Group.

In February 2015, she became the CEO of the Jamie Oliver Media Group. Inheriting write-downs, she re-structured the group, introducing a centralised operational structure in Oliver's output – across TV, book, digital, commercial and global endorsement. Over two years she stabilised the group's financial performance and prepared the business for growth with long-term production and distribution deals. During her two years as CEO she oversaw the Everyday Superfood book and TV series, Oliver's first Christmas-themed book, and the Sugar Rush campaign which resulted in a government initiative supporting sugar tax on sugary drinks. Rosencrantz left the group at the end of 2016.

== Recent career ==
At the end of 2018 Rosencrantz set up Studio 1. The first commission was a one-off entertainment show on BBC One called ‘Dame Edna Rules The Waves’. It was fronted by Dame Edna Everage. in her last ever tv show.

In July 2020, Studio 1 launched a new streaming entertainment news channel on Peacock called LIT.

Rosencrantz exited Studio 1 in December 2023

Rosencrantz is a Fellow of the Royal Television Society and a trustee of JW3 (Jewish Community Centre London).

== Personal life ==
Rosencrantz is married to the writer/director Daniel Abineri, and has one daughter, singer/songwriter Lola Aviva. She is known to watch entertainment shows as a pleasurable activity.

Rosencrantz was profoundly deaf for nearly 30 years after contracting meningitis on holiday. By the end of her time working at the Jamie Oliver Media Group, she only had 3% of her hearing left. She underwent a cochlear implant in 2018 which took her back to 100% hearing.

== Awards and recognition ==
Rosencrantz is a Fellow of the Royal Television Society, having previously been chairman of its programme awards committee.

In December 2005, ITV's Director of Television Simon Shaps testified to Rosencrantz's influence in saying that she "has been responsible for some of the biggest entertainment hits in ITV's history. It's no exaggeration to say that the US networks have watched and waited to see what Claudia has commissioned".
