= R v Ingram, C., Ingram, D. and Whittock, T. =

2003 English Crown Court fraud case

R v Ingram, C., Whittock, T. and Ingram, D.
- Court: Crown Court
- Full case name: Regina (Latin for 'Queen', meaning Elizabeth II) v (or and) Charles Ingram, Tecwen Whittock and Diana Ingram
- Decided: 7 April 2003
- Citation: [2004] EWCA Crim 2539 as to leave to appeal out of time (after 14-day deadline) as to the financial penalty imposed
- Transcript: None

Case history
- Appealed to: Court of Appeal of England and Wales
- Subsequent action: [2004] EWCA Crim 2539
- Related action: Civil suit for libel - suspended - then dismissed.

Case opinions
- Guilty as charged. Charles Ingram and Diana Ingram sentenced to 18 months; Tecwen Whittock sentenced to 12 months (all suspended sentences). Defendants fined a total of £52,500 (including defence costs).
- Decision by: jury directed by Judge Geoffrey Revlin

R v Ingram, C., Ingram, D. and Whittock, T. was a 2003 English Crown Court fraud case in which Major Charles Ingram, his wife Diana and college lecturer Tecwen Whittock were found guilty of procuring the execution of a valuable security by deception—obtaining a signed cheque for £1 million—by cheating on the filming of the UK game show Who Wants to Be a Millionaire? The charge was that Charles Ingram used coughs by his wife and Whittock to guide him to the correct answers, in order to win £1 million in violation of the rules of the game. The Ingrams were sentenced to an 18-month suspended sentence and Whittock to one of 12 months. The three also received fines and were ordered to pay costs.

== Background ==
Charles Ingram was a major in the British Army. He and his wife Diana had debts of £50,000. They both entered TV quiz shows with Diana appearing on Who Wants to Be A Millionaire? winning £32,000 and her brother also appearing separately, winning the same amount. The Ingrams had been contestants as a couple on the show but did not make it onto the hot seat. Charles entered the show on his own in 2001. By winning Fastest Finger First, he entered the game proper. During the first day of filming he made it to the £4,000 question but used up two of his three lifelines. Between the two days of filming, it is reported that Diana made contact with future contestant Tecwen Whittock to plan how to help Charles win £1 million. On the second day of filming, Charles entered saying he had a strategy for playing the rest of the game. The host Chris Tarrant stated that no-one on the production staff expected Charles to go much further as he had been struggling with the previous questions.

Suspicions arose during filming when loud coughing was heard adjacent to the correct answers being mentioned by Charles. A sound technician called Celador's CEO, Paul Smith, to inform him of their suspicions and asked if filming should be stopped. Smith said "no", but that he would review the tapes after filming had finished for the day. Charles eventually won the million pounds and received a cheque for this amount signed by Tarrant, though it was retained by Celador for eight days for processing. Smith, upon reviewing the tapes with the technicians, and playing devil's advocate with each cough heard, concluded there had been cheating and called the police. He later called Ingram and informed him that because of "irregularities in which you [Ingram] participated", Smith stated they would not be airing the programme or authorising payment of the cheque. Ingram responded stating "I completely refute that, obviously".

== Trial ==
Ingram's £1 million question

£1 million (15 of 15)

A number one followed by one hundred zeros is known by what name?

1. Googol(correct answer)
2. Megatron
3. Gigabit
4. Nanomole

The defendants each pleaded not guilty to the charge of procuring the execution of a valuable security by deception. The Crown Court trial was presided by judge Geoffrey Revlin and became known as "The Millionaire Trial". The case soon had to be restarted; the judge discharged the whole jury after one juror fell ill saying, "I cannot have a jury of only 11 members at the beginning of a trial such as this". The prosecution first accused the Ingrams of using pagers hidden on Charles' body on the first day of filming which would vibrate at the correct answer and adduced records from Diana's mobile phone to Whittock's.

The prosecution called a contestant, Larry Whitehurst, who stated that he had been watching Whittock from across the studio in his Fastest Finger First (FFF) seat, had noticed his pattern of coughing, and had suspicions that he was involved in cheating. He claimed that when it came to the £1 million question, Ingram was waiting for Whittock to cough when "googol" was mentioned; he coughed as he had predicted.

Chris Tarrant was called to the stand. He stated that he had not noticed anything amiss during the filming and had not heard any coughing. He said that following the win the Ingrams had been behaving "as normal as people who had just won £1m would be in that situation." He also said that he would not have signed the cheque if he had had suspicions of cheating and was "shocked" when he heard about the allegations.

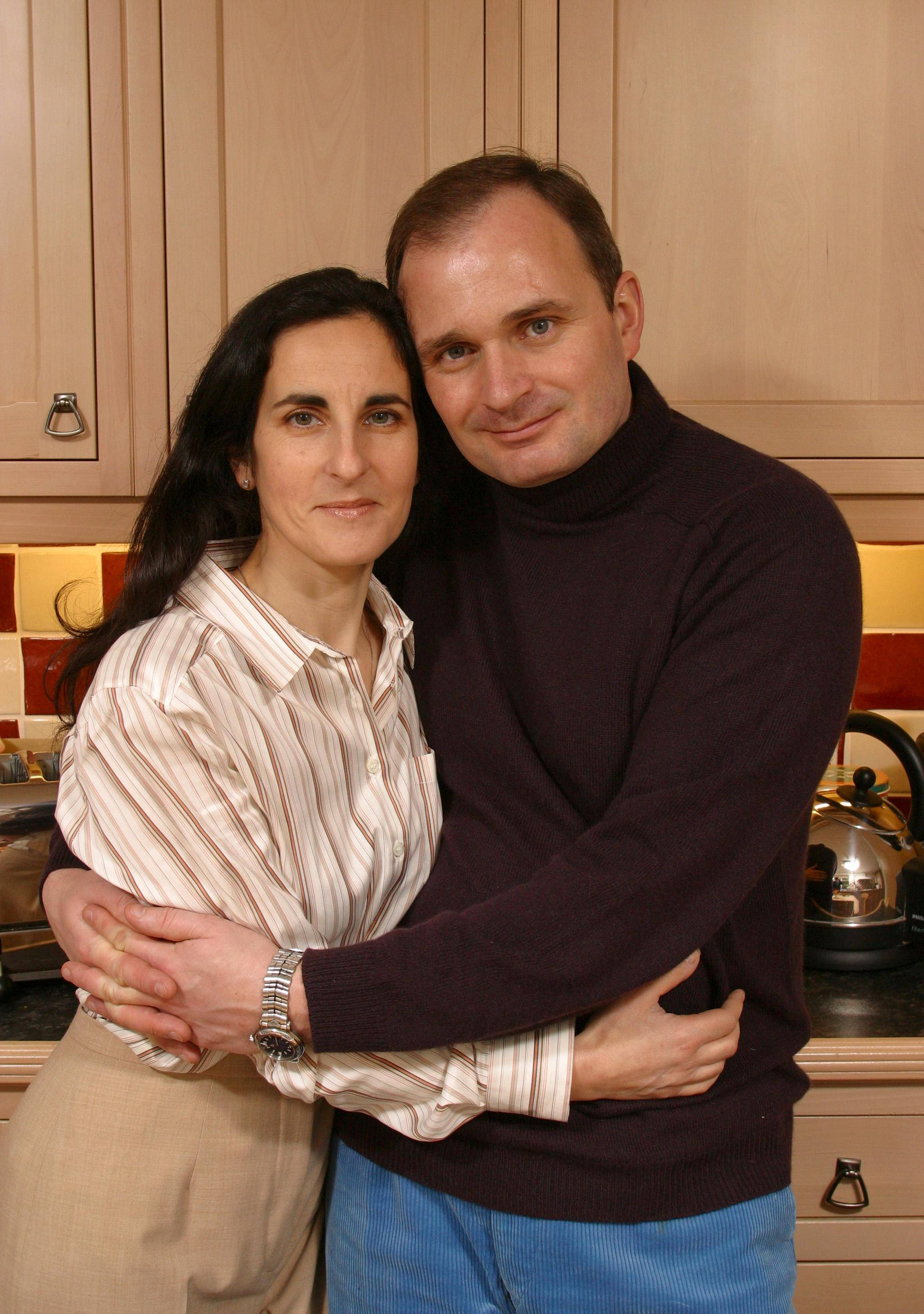
Diana and Charles Ingram in 2006

The floor manager stated that the production staff had taken the unusual step of having Charles searched after the recording because they were suspicious he was cheating using hidden pagers, but nothing was found. A sound analyst affirmed that 192 coughs were heard during the filming and the sound supervisor said 19 "significant" coughs had come from near a live microphone which he believed to be one of the FFF microphones on the side where Whittock was sitting. The supervisor also claimed that she had noticed the Ingrams' attitudes change in their dressing rooms after the win going from a mood of elation to them having an argument.

The £500,000 question

£500,000 (14 of 15)

Baron Haussmann is best known for his planning of which city?

1. Rome
2. Paris(correct answer)
3. Berlin
4. Athens

Charles took the stand and denied arguing with Diana after winning. He claimed he knew the answers to questions 11 through 14, and deduced the answer to the final question, where he relied on his maths and physics A-levels for the answer. He stated that the only outside interference that had influenced his decision was on question 10 where the audience gasped loudly at one of his proposed answers. When he was shown a recording of question 14 where a cough was heard and followed by a whispered "No!" after Charles had mentioned he was going to give Berlin as his answer, members of the public in the gallery started laughing which led to the judge threatening to clear the courtroom. Charles was asked by crown prosecutor, Nicholas Hilliard why he changed his mind. He responded by talking about knowing that Paris was a planned city for economic reasons after the Napoleonic Wars. He said he was devastated when he had heard of Diana's calls to Whittock. He said that after the allegations becoming public he had started taking medicine as his car had been vandalised, his cat shot at, and "cheat" shouted at him in public. His commander when he served in Bosnia appeared as a character witness for him and said that he had been an officer of the utmost integrity and complete honesty.

Diana then took the stand and stated that she believed that Charles had succeeded by his risk-taking strategy. She also denied claims by the prosecution about using pagers and plotting with Whittock to cough at the right answers. She said that the pager records were from her brother's pager; she claimed that he had "disappeared" due to issues with banks and was using his pager to keep in contact with her. Diana's brother Marcus did attend the first day of recording, where he was seen using his mobile phone outside the studio three times and was told to stop by production crew.

When he took the stand, Whittock put his coughing down to hay fever and a dust allergy, saying it was a coincidence the coughs coincided with the correct answers. When asked why his cough apparently disappeared when he played his game of Millionaire straight afterwards, he said he drank several glasses of water in the intermission. He recalled that Tarrant had said to him before filming "Don't forget to drink your water and use your lifelines." Following this, Whittock's doctor and a number of his friends took to the stand and affirmed Whittock had a persistent cough and that drinking water did help relieve it. He also stated that the phone call between his and Diana's phones lasted less than five minutes. The defence questioned why Whittock would agree to such a quickly devised scheme, particularly as he might cough involuntarily at any time.

After a delay in the summing up speeches due to coughing jurors, the judge asked the jury if Charles Ingram was "a genuine millionaire or a fraudster". One juror was later discharged for an unknown reason. The jury initially declared that they found Charles and Whittock guilty but Diana not guilty. The judge said that was not an acceptable verdict as all three were co-defendants and the prosecution's case relied on Diana's actions influencing those of Charles and Whittock. After retiring for a second time, the jury declared all three guilty of the charge. The Ingrams received an 18-month suspended sentence and a fine of £15,000 plus £10,000 for costs. Whittock received 6 months less and a fine of £10,000 plus £7,500 for costs.

== Appeal ==
The Ingrams appealed against the fines. The Court of Appeal denied Charles' appeal as not being justified and refused him leave to appeal further; Diana's was permitted as she had no financial independence. An appeal drawing on the Human Rights Act 1998 allowed Charles to challenge their costs. Returning to the court and to judge Revlin, the Ingrams argued in forma pauperis ("in the manner of a pauper") for their costs to be cut. He agreed to cut their defence costs from £65,000 to £30,000 but warned Charles that despite having declared bankruptcy, he faced prison if the fines were not paid.

A 2016 newspaper article states the Ingrams were means-assessed at the magistrates' court to pay £5,000 and had paid £1,240.

== Libel claim ==
Charles sued Celador in a civil case for £240,000, per usual procedure suspended for the criminal law decision; this was dismissed.

== Aftermath ==
After the court case, the Ingrams would be constantly coughed at by members of the public and Charles gained the nickname of "The Coughing Major". They were also subject to a campaign of harassment which involved people vandalising their car and their cat being shot with an air gun. The Army Board requested that Charles resign his commission, which he did. Whittock resigned from his lecturer's job at Pontypridd College and trademarked his name to prevent a company from naming a cough medicine after him. The trademark expired in 2013 and was declared "dead" in 2014 after not being renewed. ITV broadcast two documentaries about the case, titled Who Wants to Be a Millionaire?: Major Fraud, hosted by journalist Martin Bashir, and Who Wants to Steal a Million? The programmes were produced by James Goldston.

Years after the court case, a number of journalists have cast doubt on the original verdict, citing the inconsistency of the coughs and Tarrant's testimony that he had heard no coughing. Some also cited that coughing was heard during the game involving Judith Keppel, the first ever millionaire winner of Millionaire, but was not investigated. In 2015, James Plaskett and Bob Woffinden published Bad Show: The Quiz, The Cough, The Millionaire Major, in which they questioned the defendants' guilt. In 2017, a play titled Quiz was released about the case. A three-episode television series based on the play, also titled Quiz, was aired on ITV in 2020.

== See also ==
- 1950s quiz show scandals
- Martin Flood
