= The Master (Australian game show) =

2006–2007 Australian quiz TV series

- Genre: Quiz show
- Created by: Grant Rule
- Directed by: Richard Franc
- Presented by: Mark Beretta
- Starring: Martin Flood (The Master)
- Country of origin: Australia
- Original language: English
- No. of seasons: 1
- No. of episodes: 7

Production
- Executive producer: Grant Rule
- Producer: Rob Menzies
- Production locations: Global Television Studios, South Melbourne
- Running time: 60 minutes (including commercials)
- Production companies: Saints & Sinners

Original release
- Network: Seven Network
- Release: 16 August 2006 – 16 January 2007

The Master is an Australian quiz show that debuted on Seven Network on 16 August 2006. The show was cancelled after its premiere episode. The remaining episodes aired over the non-ratings period in 2006–2007, with the final episode airing on 16 January 2007. Hosted by Mark Beretta, the show had a potential prize of $1,000,000. It was produced by Grant Rule and Seven Melbourne. Repeats aired on 7Two at 11 am weekdays in late July 2021.

== Format ==
Five players fought out a series of rounds involving general knowledge questions. This was both against each other and the clock, all under the eyes of the Master, Martin Flood, who sat in a chair watching to find the contestants' weaknesses. The player who won earned the right to face the Master for his title and for the prize of $1,000,000.

The five played against each other in a series of general knowledge rounds, winning $100 for each correct answer in general knowledge rounds and $200 in "Master's Choice" rounds (where Flood chose the category). Each round lasted for 90 seconds. If a contestant answered incorrectly, they were locked out from answering the next question. Players with the lowest score were gradually eliminated until three remained. If at the end of a round, two contestants were on the same score, the Master would choose which contestant to eliminate. After two contestants had been eliminated, there was a round where the three remaining contestants were each subjected to a round of questions on their "preferred category" called the "mean minute". In this round, correct answers were worth $100 and incorrect answers resulted in a deduction of $200. After the "mean minute" round there was a final general knowledge round, after which the contestant with the highest score won the right to play against the Master. Each eliminated contestant took home what they earned in the general knowledge rounds.

The winner was given $50,000 to "bet" on their best-of-five questions game with the Master. The contestant could bet either $10,000, $20,000, $30,000, $40,000 or the entire $50,000. If the contestant risked any amount below $50,000, the Master will choose the category of questions to be asked and if the contestant is successful they would win ten times the amount staked. If the contestant bet the entire $50,000 they selected the category of questions and played for $1,000,000 and the chance to become the new Master. If, however, they risked the entire $50,000 and failed, they also lost all the money they had won in the previous rounds, walking away empty-handed. This meant that if a contestant risked less than $50,000, they played for either $100,000, $200,000, $300,000, or $400,000.

== Ratings ==
Seven boss David Leckie ordered The Master off air when it rated just 744,000 capital city viewers. The remaining six episodes already recorded aired on Monday at 7:30 pm, during the summer non-ratings period. The second episode which screened on 12 December (non-ratings period) rated slightly higher at 839,000 capital city viewers, and the third episode attracted 826,000.

== See also ==
- List of television series cancelled after one episode
- Tout le monde veut prendre sa place
