= Matthew Macfadyen =

English actor (born 1974)

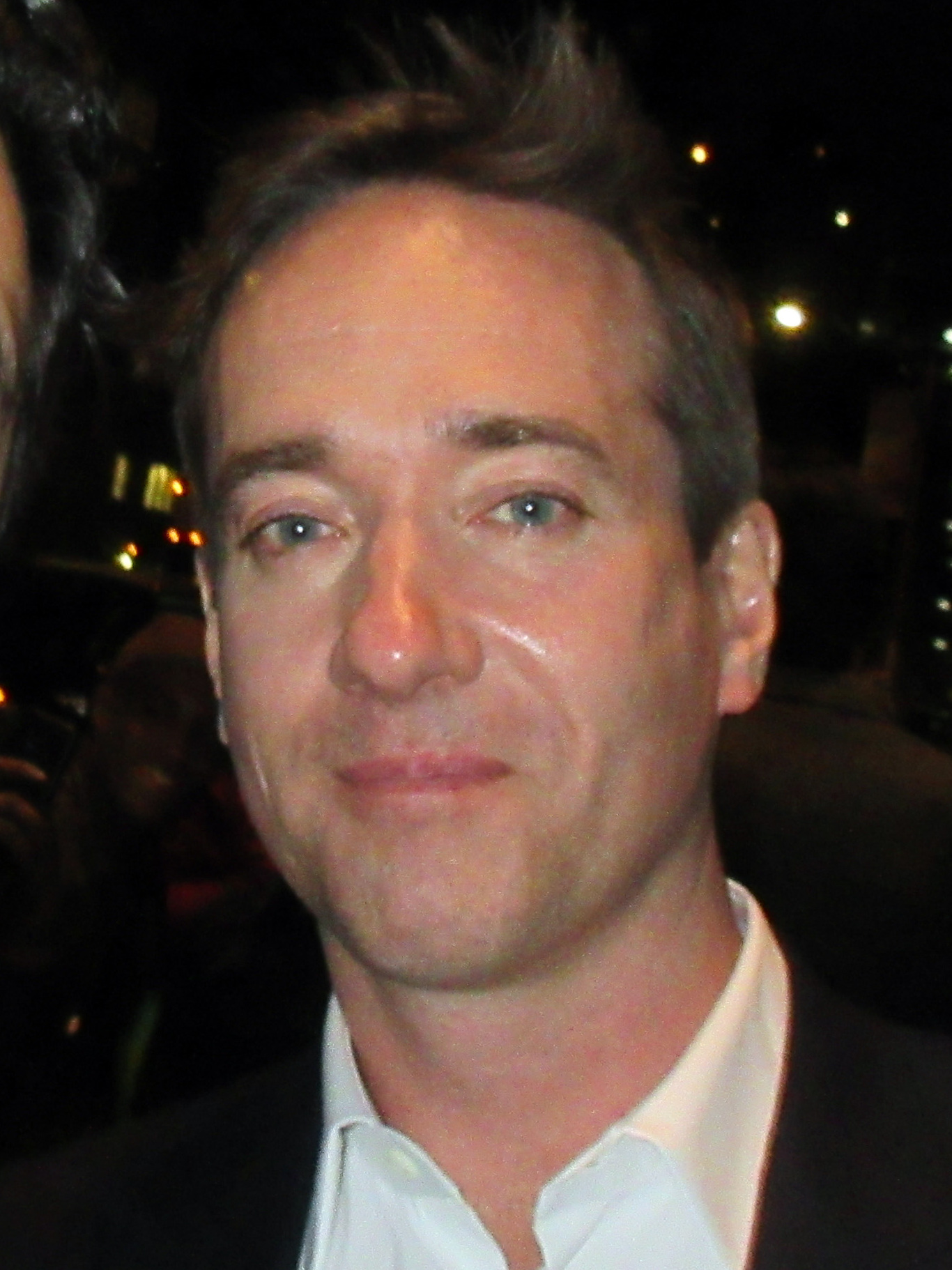
- Macfadyen in 2019
- Born: David Matthew Macfadyen; 17 October 1974 (age 52); Great Yarmouth, Norfolk, England
- Education: Royal Academy of Dramatic Art (BA)
- Occupation: Actor
- Years active: 1994–present
- Spouse: Keeley Hawes (m. 2004)
- Children: 2

David Matthew Macfadyen (/məkˈfædiən/; born 17 October 1974) is a British actor. Known for his roles on stage and screen, he gained prominence for his role as Mr. Darcy in Joe Wright's Pride & Prejudice (2005) before gaining wider recognition for playing Tom Wambsgans in the HBO drama series Succession (2018–2023), for which he received two Primetime Emmy Awards, two BAFTA TV Awards, and a Golden Globe Award.

Macfadyen made his television debut in 1998 as Hareton Earnshaw in Wuthering Heights. He portrayed Tom Quinn in the BBC One spy series Spooks (2002–2004, 2011), and Inspector Edmund Reid in the BBC mystery series Ripper Street (2012–2016). For his role in Criminal Justice (2009), he received the British Academy Television Award for Best Supporting Actor. He also portrayed Henry Wilcox in Howards End (2017), Charles Ingram in Quiz (2020), John Stonehouse in Stonehouse (2023) and Charles J. Guiteau in Death by Lightning (2025).

In film, Macfadyen is known for his roles in Death at a Funeral (2007), Frost/Nixon (2008), Anna Karenina (2012), The Assistant (2019), and Operation Mincemeat (2021). In 2024, he played Mr. Paradox in the superhero film Deadpool & Wolverine.

== Early life and education ==
Macfadyen was born on 17 October 1974 in Great Yarmouth, Norfolk, the son of Meinir (née Owen), a drama teacher and former actress, and Martin Macfadyen, an oil engineer. His paternal grandparents were Scottish and his maternal grandparents were Welsh. Macfadyen was brought up in a number of places, including Jakarta, Indonesia, as a result of his father's occupation.

He attended schools in England, including in Louth, Lincolnshire, as well as in Scotland and Indonesia. He went to Oakham School in Rutland before being accepted to the Royal Academy of Dramatic Art (RADA) at 17. As a student, he was inspired by Ingmar Bergman's Fanny and Alexander, which he thought was "[a]n example to follow – an example of people acting with each other...", and "[f]eatured just the most extraordinary acting I'd ever seen". He studied at RADA from 1992 to 1995.

== Career ==
=== 1998–2004: Early roles and theater work ===
After leaving RADA, Macfadyen became known in British theatre primarily for his work with the stage company Cheek by Jowl, for which he played Antonio in The Duchess of Malfi, Charles Surface in The School for Scandal, and Benedick in Much Ado About Nothing. His Benedick was played as an officer-class buffoon with a moustache and a braying laugh. In 2005, he played Prince Hal in Henry IV, Parts One and Two at the Royal National Theatre, with Michael Gambon in the role of Falstaff. In 2007, he returned to the stage, portraying an American, Clay, a stay-at-home father with a liberal attitude in the play The Pain and the Itch.

A TV breakthrough came when he appeared as Hareton Earnshaw in an adaptation of Wuthering Heights, screened on the ITV network in 1998. Further television drama work followed, including starring roles in the dramas Warriors (1999) and The Way We Live Now (2001), both for the BBC. Also in 2001, he earned acclaim for his starring role in the BBC Two drama serial Perfect Strangers, which was written and directed by Stephen Poliakoff. In 2002, he starred in The Project, a BBC drama charting New Labour's rise to power.

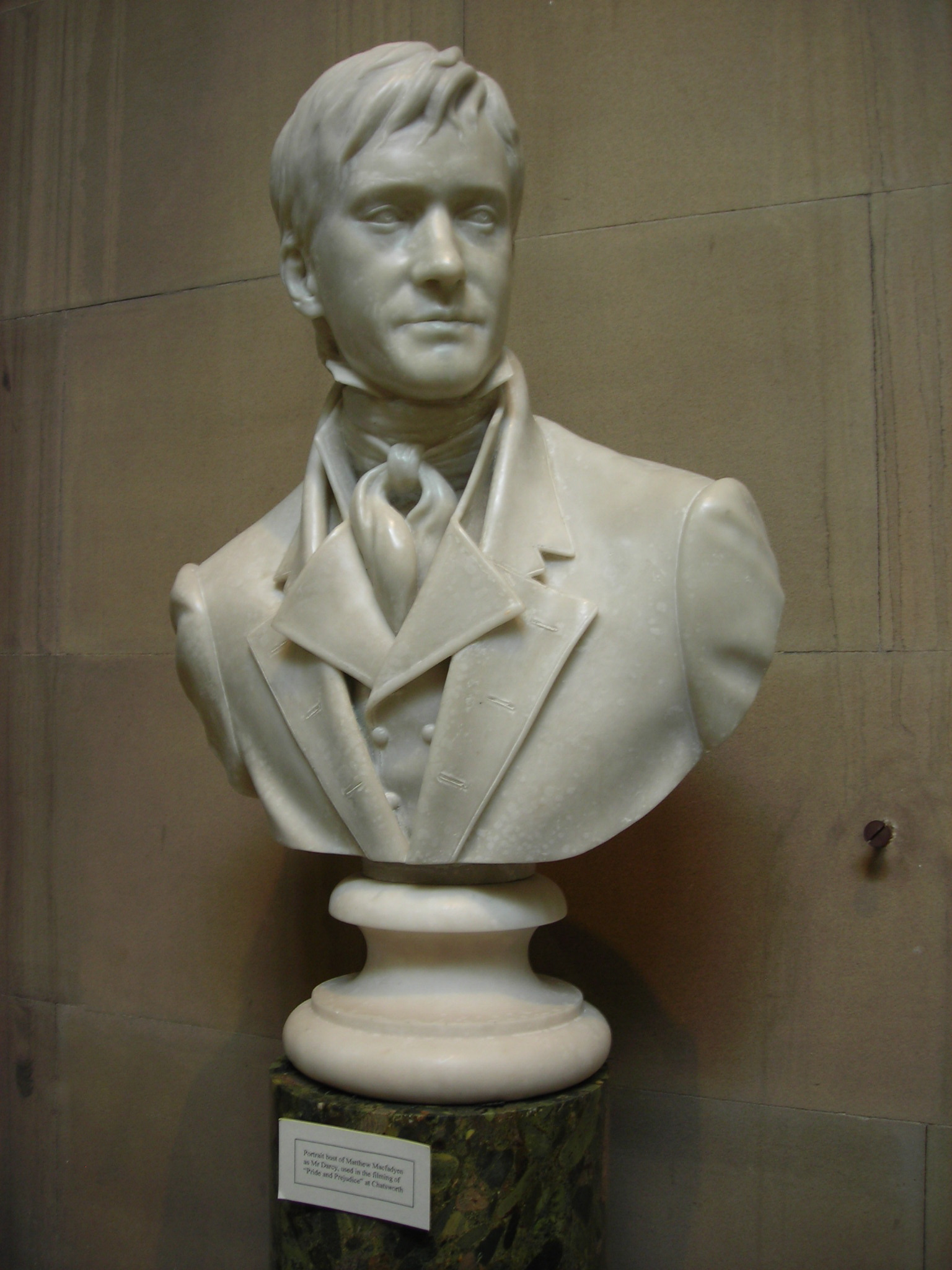
A bust from the 2005 film Pride & Prejudice of Matthew Macfadyen's Mr. Darcy.

He starred in Spooks, which became a success when screened on BBC One. A longer second season was screened in 2003, and a third season was broadcast in autumn 2004, with him leaving the series in the second episode. The series was aired as MI-5 on the A&E Network. In 2007 he appeared in the one-off Channel 4 drama Secret Life, which dealt with paedophilia. Macfadyen won the Best Actor award at the Royal Television Society 2007 Awards for this part, and was nominated for a BAFTA. He also appeared in a short sketch for Comic Relief as the bridegroom in Mr. Bean's Wedding, alongside Rowan Atkinson and Michelle Ryan. Macfadyen appeared in films including Enigma (released in 2001), and In My Father's Den, for which he received the New Zealand Screen Award for Best Actor.

=== 2005–2017: Pride & Prejudice and other roles ===
He starred as the romantic lead Fitzwilliam Darcy in an adaptation of Pride and Prejudice, released in the UK in September 2005. Macfadyen starred in Frank Oz's Death at a Funeral and the film Incendiary, based on Chris Cleave's novel alongside Michelle Williams and Ewan McGregor. He also appeared in Ron Howard's film Frost/Nixon, in which he played John Birt. In 2008, he played the male lead Arthur Clennam in the BBC adaptation of Charles Dickens' Little Dorrit. In 2009 Macfadyen appeared alongside Academy Award-nominated actress Helena Bonham Carter in the BBC Four movie Enid, based on the life of Enid Blyton, as Hugh Pollock, Blyton's publisher and first husband. In 2010, he played the Sheriff of Nottingham in Robin Hood. He starred as Prior Philip in the TV serial The Pillars of the Earth, and was the middle-aged Logan Mountstuart in Any Human Heart. In June 2010, Macfadyen won a British Academy Television Award for Best Supporting Actor for his work in Criminal Justice. In 2011, Macfadyen made a final cameo in Spooks, and in 2012, he played Oblonsky in Joe Wright's film Anna Karenina. From December 2012, he began portraying Detective Inspector Edmund Reid in BBC One's Ripper Street.

In 2013–14, he played Jeeves in the production of Jeeves and Wooster in Perfect Nonsense at the Duke of York's Theatre in the West End of London. The play won the 2014 Olivier award for Best New Comedy. In 2015, Amazon Prime picked up Ripper Street and, after good reviews, it was recommissioned for fourth and fifth seasons. Macfadyen said he was "delighted to be embarking on another dose of Ripper Street – blood and guts, pocket watches and Victorian headgear, wonderfully dark, moving and mysterious story lines from Mr Richard Wardlow". The series also aired in the U.S. on BBC America. Also in 2015, he guest starred in the pilot episode of The Last Kingdom. In 2018, he played Mr. Stahlbaum in the film The Nutcracker and the Four Realms, which received mostly negative reviews.

=== 2018–present: Succession and acclaim ===
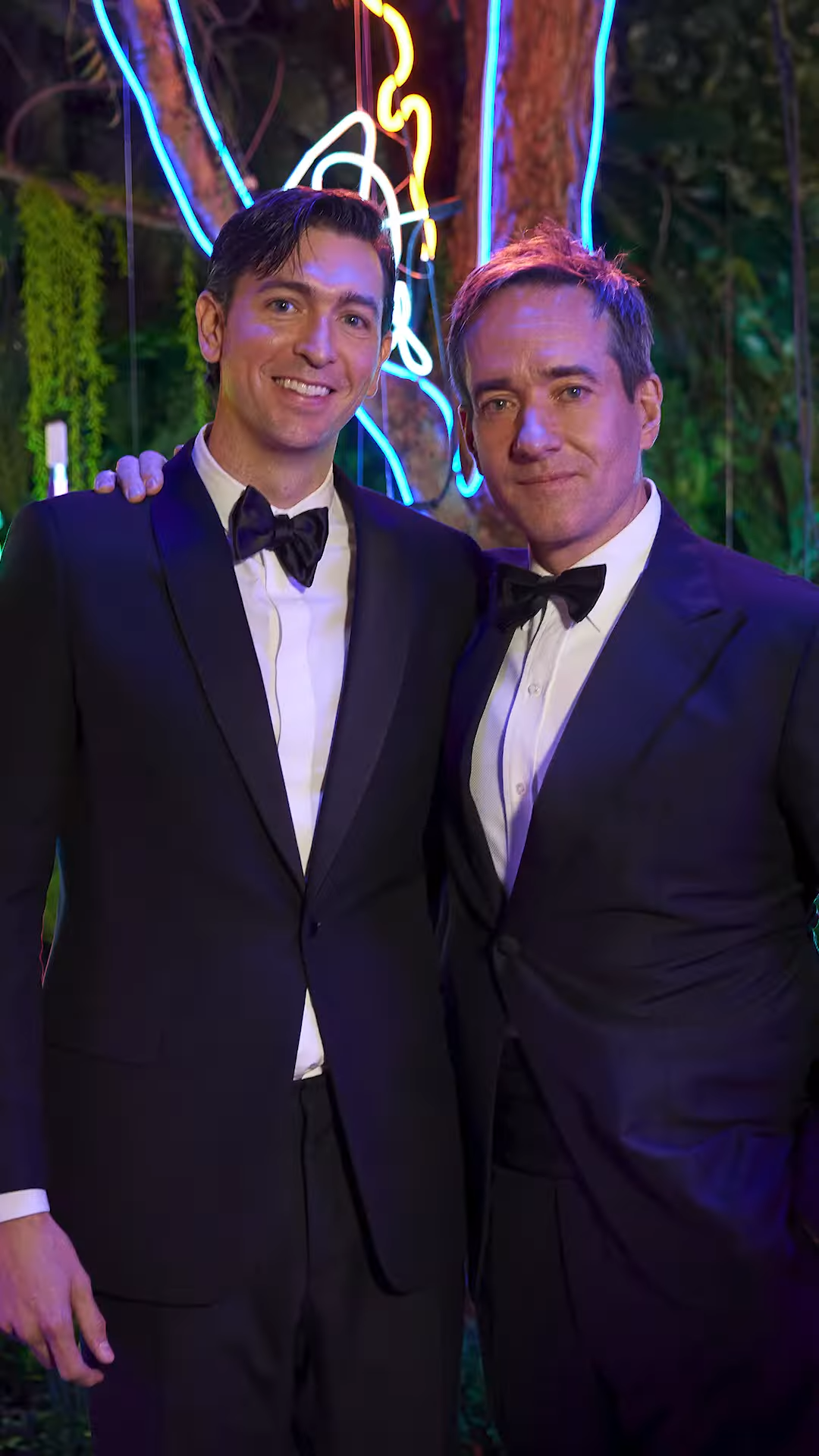
Nicholas Braun and Macfadyen at the Primetime Emmy Awards in 2024

From 2018 to 2023, he starred as Tom Wambsgans in the HBO series Succession, for which he received Primetime Emmy Awards in 2022 and 2023 for Outstanding Supporting Actor in a Drama Series, a Primetime Emmy Award nomination in 2020, and a Golden Globe Award for Best Performance by a Male Actor in a Supporting Role on Television in 2024. In 2020, he appeared in the role of Major Charles Ingram in a three-part ITV drama, Quiz, based on the controversial coughing cheat scandal on Who Wants to Be a Millionaire? in 2001. In 2024, Macfadyen played Mr. Paradox in the superhero film Deadpool & Wolverine. He also starred as Charles J. Guiteau in the 2025 Netflix miniseries Death by Lightning.

In August 2025, it was announced that Macfadyen would be voicing Lord Voldemort in Harry Potter: The Full-Cast Audio Editions, a production of Audible and J.K. Rowling's Pottermore.

== Personal life ==
In 2002, Macfadyen began a relationship with his Spooks co-star Keeley Hawes. They were married in November 2004. The couple have two children. Macfadyen is stepfather to Hawes's son from her previous marriage. In March 2024, it was reported that Macfadyen is a member of the Garrick Club.

== Acting credits ==
=== Film ===
Key
†	Denotes films that have not yet been released

Film roles
Year	Title	Role	Notes
2000	Maybe Baby	Nigel	
2001	Enigma	Lt. Cave	
2002	The Project	Paul Tibbenham	
2004	The Reckoning	King's Justice	
2004	In My Father's Den	Paul Prior	
2005	Pride & Prejudice	Fitzwilliam Darcy	
2007	Grindhouse	Eye Gouging Victim	Segment: Don't
2007	Death at a Funeral	Daniel Howells	
2008	Incendiary	Terence Butcher	
2008	Frost/Nixon	John Birt	
2010	Robin Hood	Sheriff of Nottingham	
2011	The Three Musketeers	Athos	
2012	Anna Karenina	Oblonsky	
2014	Lost in Karastan	Emil Forester	
2015	The von Trapp Family: A Life of Music	Georg von Trapp	
2016	Revolution: New Art for a New World	Vladimir Lenin (voice)	Documentary
2017	The Current War	J. P. Morgan	
2018	The Nutcracker and the Four Realms	Benjamin Stahlbaum	
2019	The Assistant	Wilcock	
2021	Operation Mincemeat	Charles Cholmondeley	
2024	Deadpool & Wolverine	Mr. Paradox	
2025	Holland	Fred Vandergroot	
TBA	Séance on a Wet Afternoon †	Billy	Filming

=== Television ===
Key
†	Denotes television productions that have not yet been released

Television roles
Year	Title	Role	Notes
1998	Wuthering Heights	Hareton Earnshaw	Television film
1999	Warriors	Alan James	Television film
2000	Murder Rooms	Brian Waller	Episode: "The Dark Beginnings of Sherlock Holmes: Part 1"
2001	Perfect Strangers	Daniel Symon	3 episodes
2001	The Way We Live Now	Sir Felix Carbury	4 episodes
2002–2004, 2011	Spooks	Tom Quinn	19 episodes
2007	Mr. Bean's Wedding	The Groom	Short video
2007	Secret Life	Charlie	Television film
2008	Ashes to Ashes	Gil Hollis	Episode #1.7
2008	Little Dorrit	Arthur Clennam	8 episodes
2008	Agatha Christie's Marple	Inspector Neele	Episode: "A Pocket Full of Rye"
2009	Enid	Hugh Pollock	Television film
2009	Criminal Justice	Joe Miller	3 episodes
2010	The Pillars of the Earth	Prior Philip	Main role, 8 episodes
2010	Any Human Heart	Logan Mountstuart	Main role, 4 episodes
2012–2016	Ripper Street	Det. Insp. Edmund Reid	Main role, 36 episodes
2013	Ambassadors	Prince of Darkness	3 episodes
2015	The Enfield Haunting	Guy Playfair	3 episodes
2015	The Last Kingdom	Lord Uhtred	Episode #1.1
2016	Churchill's Secret	Randolph Churchill	Television film
2017	Howards End	Henry Wilcox	Main role, 4 episodes
2018–2023	Succession	Tom Wambsgans	Main role, 39 episodes
2020	Quiz	Maj. Charles Ingram	Main role, 3 episodes
2023	Stonehouse	John Stonehouse	Main role, 3 episodes; also executive producer
2025	Death by Lightning	Charles J. Guiteau	Main role, 4 episodes
2026	The Miniature Wife	Les Littlejohn	Main role; also executive producer
TBA	Legacy of Spies †	George Smiley	Main role; also executive producer
TBA	You Are Here †	Michael	Main role; also executive producer

=== Theatre ===
Year	Title	Role	Playwright	Venue	Ref.
1994	The Crimson Island	Dymogatsky	Mikhail Bulgakov	Royal Academy of Dramatic Arts	
1994	Lorca's Death	Rafael/Intellect	Ben Benison	Royal Academy of Dramatic Arts	
1994	The Feigned Inconstancy	Chevalier	Marivaux	Royal Academy of Dramatic Arts	
1994	The Beggar's Opera	Macheath	John Gay	Royal Academy of Dramatic Arts	
1995	One Flew Over the Cuckoo's Nest	Chief Bromden	Dale Wasserman	Royal Academy of Dramatic Arts	
1995	The Libertine	John Wilmot	Stephen Jeffreys	Royal Academy of Dramatic Arts	
1995	My Funny Valentine	Solo Performer	—N/a	Royal Academy of Dramatic Arts	
1995	The Duchess of Malfi	Antonio Bologna	John Webster	Cheek by Jowl	
1996	A Midsummer Night's Dream	Demetrius	William Shakespeare	Royal Shakespeare Company	
1998	Much Ado About Nothing	Benedick	William Shakespeare	Cheek by Jowl	
1998	The School for Scandal	Charles Surface	Richard Brinsley Sheridan	Royal Shakespeare Company	
1999	Battle Royal	Mr. Brougham	Nick Stafford	Royal National Theatre	
2005	Henry IV	Prince Hal	William Shakespeare	Royal National Theatre	
2006	Total Eclipse	Paul Verlaine	Christopher Hampton	reading at Royal Court Theatre	
2007	The Pain and the Itch	Clay	Bruce Norris	Royal Court Theatre	
2010	Private Lives	Elyot Chase	Noël Coward	Vaudeville Theatre	
2013	Perfect Nonsense	Jeeves	David and Robert Goodale	Duke of York's Theatre	

=== Radio ===
Year	Title	Author	Notes	Ref.
2000	The Voyage of the Beagle	Charles Darwin	BBC Radio 4	
2001	Trampoline	Meredith Oakes	BBC Radio 4	
2004	The Coma	Alex Garland	audio book	
2004	Getting Away From It: The Island	Tim Pears	BBC Radio 4	
2005	Stories We Could Tell	Tony Parsons	audio book	
2007	The Making of Music	—N/a	BBC Radio 4	
2025	Harry Potter	J. K. Rowling	Audible	

=== Documentary ===
Year	Title	Notes	Ref.
2003	Essential Poems (To Fall in Love With)	BBC Two	
2004	The Hungerford Massacre	BBC One	
2006	The 9/11 Liars	Channel 4	
2006	Nuremberg: Nazis on Trial	BBC Two	
2007	The Blair Years	BBC One	
2007	Last Party at the Palace	Channel 4	
2008	Dangerous Jobs for Girls	Channel 4	
2008	Words of War	ITV1	
2009	Wine	BBC Four	
2009	Inside MI5	ITV1	
2014	Horse Power	Sky Atlantic	

=== Video games ===
Year	Title	Role	Ref.
2007	Robin Hood's Quest	Robin Hood	

== Awards and nominations ==
Organizations	Year	Category	Work	Result	Ref.
Actor Awards	2008	Outstanding Cast in a Motion Picture	Frost/Nixon	Nominated	
Actor Awards	2021	Outstanding Ensemble in a Drama Series	Succession (season three)	Won	
Actor Awards	2023	Outstanding Actor in a Drama Series	Succession (season four)	Nominated	
Actor Awards	2023	Outstanding Ensemble in a Drama Series	Succession (season four)	Won	
British Academy Television Awards	2008	Best Actor	Secret Life	Nominated	
British Academy Television Awards	2010	Best Supporting Actor	Criminal Justice	Won	
British Academy Television Awards	2022	Best Supporting Actor	Succession	Won	
British Academy Television Awards	2024	Best Supporting Actor	Succession	Won	
British Independent Film Awards	2005	Best Actor	In My Father's Den	Nominated	
Critics' Choice Television Awards	2018	Best Supporting Actor in a Drama Series	Succession (season one)	Nominated	
Critics' Choice Television Awards	2021	Best Supporting Actor in a Drama Series	Succession (season three)	Nominated	
Critics' Choice Television Awards	2023	Best Supporting Actor in a Drama Series	Succession (season four)	Nominated	
Golden Globe Awards	2024	Best Supporting Actor – Series, Miniseries or Television Film	Succession	Won	
London Critics Circle Film Awards	2006	Best Newcomer	Pride & Prejudice	Nominated	
Primetime Emmy Awards	2020	Outstanding Supporting Actor in a Drama Series	Succession (episode: "This Is Not for Tears")	Nominated	
Primetime Emmy Awards	2022	Outstanding Supporting Actor in a Drama Series	Succession (episode: "All the Bells Say")	Won	
Primetime Emmy Awards	2023	Outstanding Supporting Actor in a Drama Series	Succession (episode: "Tailgate Party")	Won	

== See also ==
- List of British actors
- List of Primetime Emmy Award winners
- List of Golden Globe winners
