= Quiz (TV series) =

2020 British television serial

- Promotional poster
- Genre: Drama
- Based on: Quiz by James Graham; Bad Show: the Quiz, the Cough, the Millionaire Major by Bob Woffinden and James Plaskett
- Written by: James Graham
- Directed by: Stephen Frears
- Starring: Matthew Macfadyen; Sian Clifford; Mark Bonnar; Aisling Bea; Elliot Levey; Risteárd Cooper; Trystan Gravelle; Michael Jibson; Helen McCrory; Michael Sheen
- Music by: Murray Gold
- Country of origin: United Kingdom
- Original language: English
- No. of episodes: 3

Production
- Executive producers: Dan Winch; William Village; James Graham; Stephen Frears; Andy Harries
- Producer: Alice Pearse
- Cinematography: Hubert Taczanowski
- Editor: Pia Di Ciaula
- Running time: 46–54 minutes
- Production companies: Left Bank Pictures; AMC Networks

Original release
- Network: ITV
- Release: 13 April – 15 April 2020

Quiz is a British drama television serial developed for the ITV channel and AMC. Written by James Graham and directed by Stephen Frears, it was based on his play of the same name, and was commissioned by William Village and the book Bad Show: the Quiz, the Cough, the Millionaire Major by Bob Woffinden and James Plaskett. It consists of three hour-long episodes.

Quiz focuses on Charles Ingram, a former army major in the Royal Engineers, and his unexpected win of the £1 million jackpot prize on Who Wants to Be a Millionaire? in 2001. It then follows the criminal trial in which he and his wife were convicted of cheating their way to success.

Quiz premiered on ITV on 13 April 2020. Released during the COVID-19 pandemic lockdowns, Quiz received a large audience, with the first episode being seen live by an average audience of 5.3 million in the United Kingdom. Quiz received positive reviews from critics. Michael Sheen was nominated for Best Supporting Actor at the British Academy Television Awards for his role in Quiz.

== Premise ==
After the British production company Celador pitched a game show in which the prize was one million pounds, the show, titled Who Wants to Be a Millionaire?, became very successful, leading to the formation of an international franchise. One of the contestants of the show is Charles Ingram, who is a former army major in the Royal Engineers. He unexpectedly wins the £1 million jackpot on the quiz show in 2001, followed by a criminal trial in which he and his wife were convicted of cheating their way to success.

== Episodes ==
No.	Title	Directed by	Written by	Original release date	U.K. viewers (millions)
1	"Episode 1"	Stephen Frears	James Graham	13 April 2020	9.05
Major Charles Ingram does not like quizzes, but for his wife Diana and brother-in-law Adrian, knowing the answer is a way of life. As both Diana and Adrian do not win as much as they hoped on the new TV show Who Wants to Be a Millionaire?, all eyes turn to an unsuspecting Charles to win the million-pound prize. Meanwhile, the repeated reappearance of middle-class, professional quizzers has not gone unnoticed by the ITV team and producer Paul Smith makes a vow to stop them by any means necessary.
2	"Episode 2"	Stephen Frears	James Graham	14 April 2020	8.74
Charles returns for a second night in the hot seat with a new strategy. After his previously hopeless performance, he proves massively successful, his dithering answers invariably turning out to be right. However, the production team finds his sudden change of fortunes suspicious and begins looking into an unusual pattern of coughing from the studio audience.
3	"Episode 3"	Stephen Frears	James Graham	15 April 2020	8.97
Hapless Charles, the man who has never heard of Craig David (one of his questions), is a national laughing stock amid accusations that he hit on right answers after affirmation coughs from his co-conspirators. Persecuted and hounded by the public and press, Charles, Diana, and Tecwen head to court. But his barrister works hard to try to convince the jury that Charles and his wife are innocent. At first, it seems the case for the prosecution is solid, but as the case for the defense gets underway, the jury learns there is far more to the story than they first thought.

== Cast ==
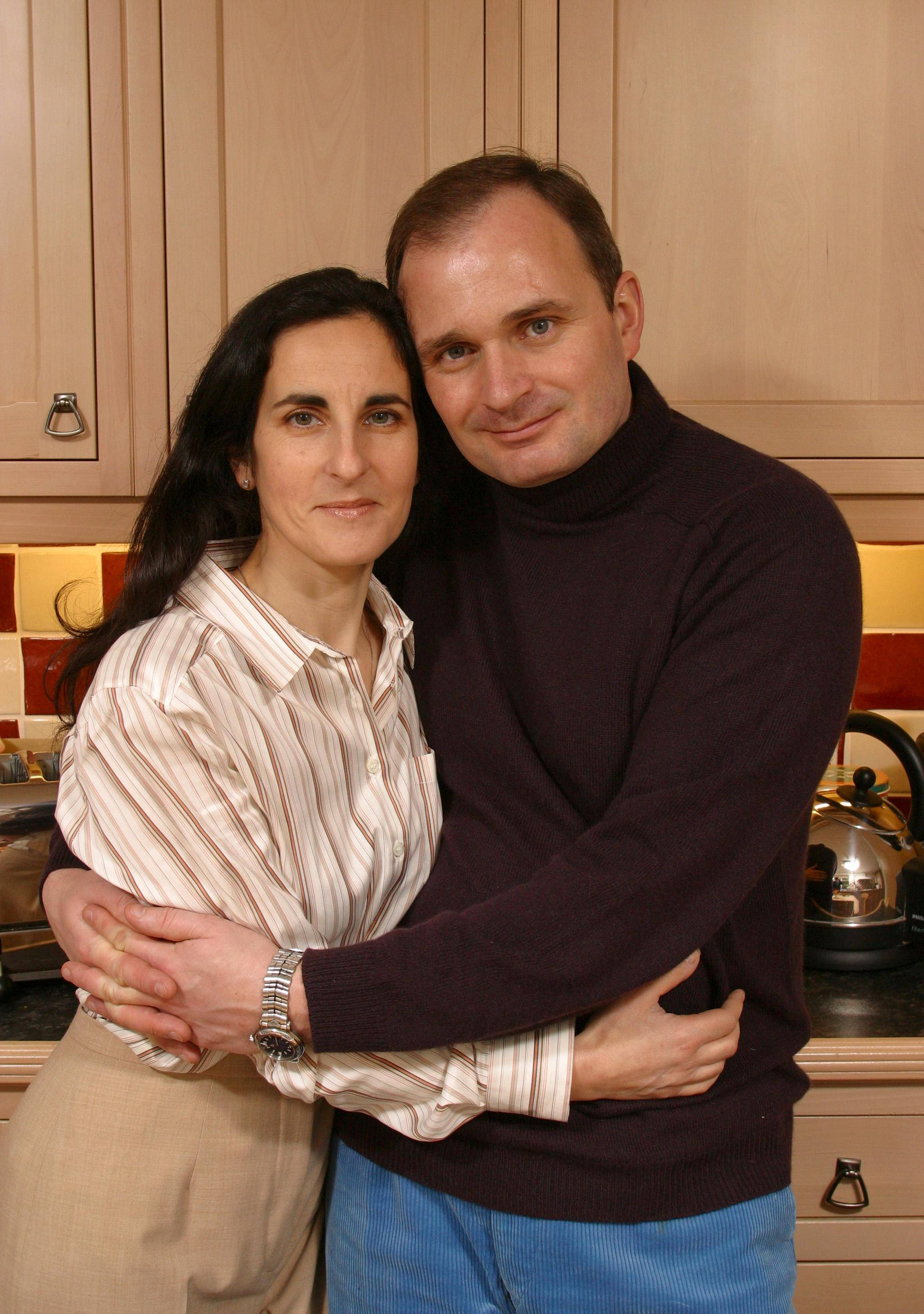
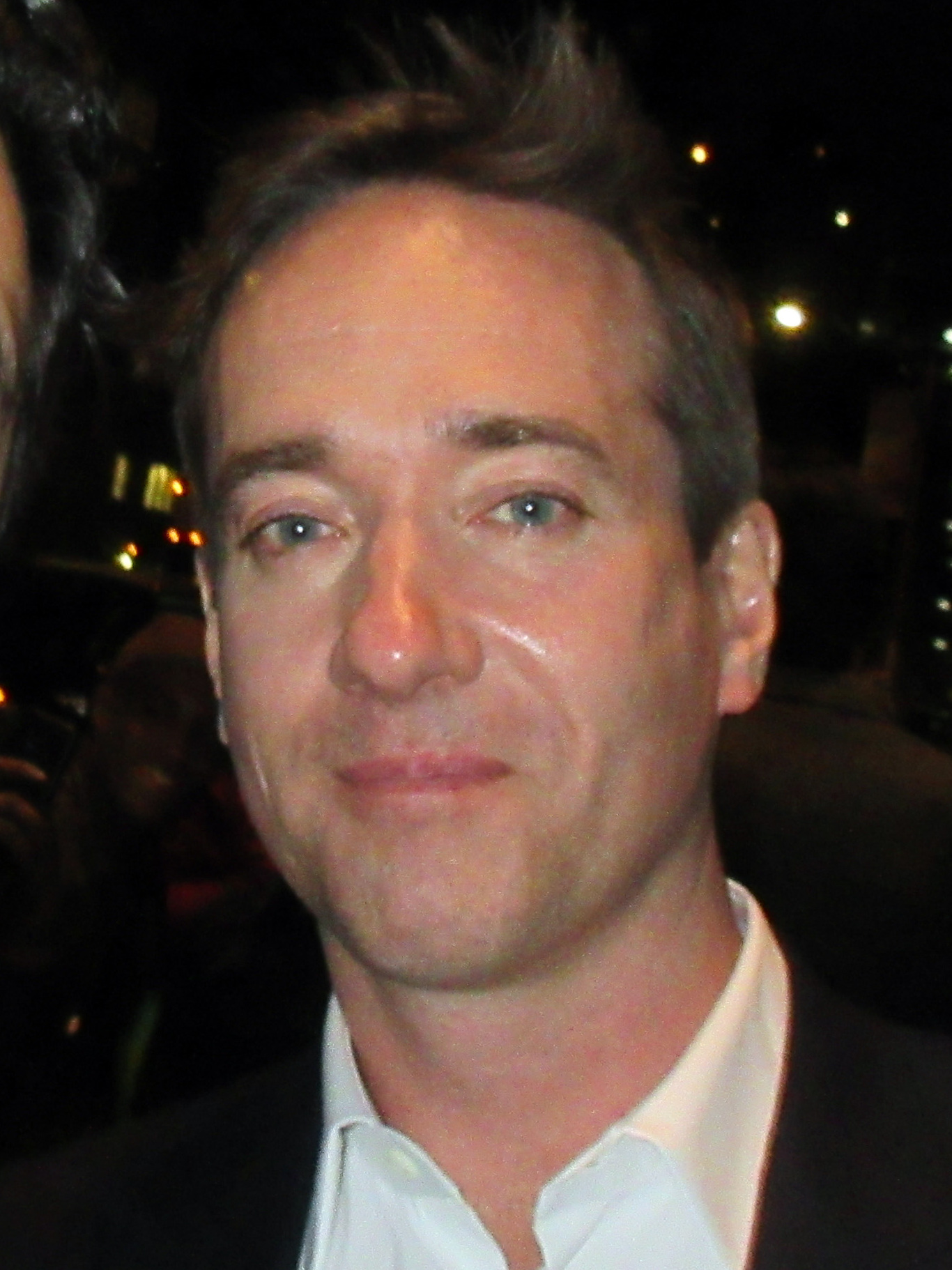
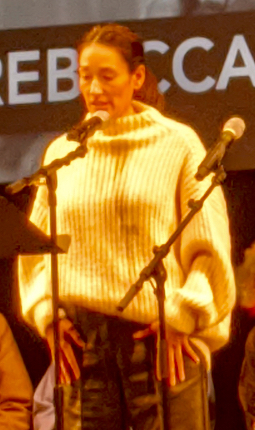
Charles Ingram and Diana Ingram are portrayed by Matthew Macfadyen and Sian Clifford respectively.
- Matthew Macfadyen as Charles Ingram, a former army major game show contestant
- Michael Sheen as Chris Tarrant, the host of Who Wants to Be a Millionaire?
- Sian Clifford as Diana Ingram, the wife of Charles Ingram
- Mark Bonnar as Paul Smith, TV producer and co-chairman of Celador
- Helen McCrory as Sonia Woodley, the Queen's Counsel for the Ingram family
- Michael Jibson as Tecwen Whittock, a college lecturer
- Aisling Bea as Claudia Rosencrantz, a television executive and journalist
- Trystan Gravelle as Adrian Pollock, The brother of Diana Ingram
- Elliot Levey as David Briggs, TV producer and co-chairman of Celador
- Risteárd Cooper as David Liddiment, The director of programmes and channels for ITV Studios
- Jasmyn Banks as Nicola Howson, a member of the ITV production team
- Andrew Leung as Kevin Duff, a sound engineer for the show
- Martin Trenaman as DS Ferguson, an officer
- Nicholas Woodeson as Nicholas Hilliard, the King's Counsel for ITV
- Paul Bazely as "Lionel from Legal", a legal advisor

== Production ==
=== Development and writing ===
Quiz is based on James Graham's play of the same name, and was commissioned by William Village and the book Bad Show: the Quiz, the Cough, the Millionaire Major by Bob Woffinden and James Plaskett. In March 2018, Deadline Hollywood reported that Left Bank Pictures was developing a television adaptation of Quiz. In April 2019, Left Bank was in talks for Stephen Frears to direct the adaptation. In August 2019, it was announced that ITV and AMC co-commissioned the drama series, with James Graham writing and Frears directing all three episodes. Graham pitched Quiz as "Ocean's 11, but with really middle-class English people using encyclopedias instead of guns.” Graham also said that he attempted to detail both sides of the story when writing Quiz.

=== Casting and filming ===
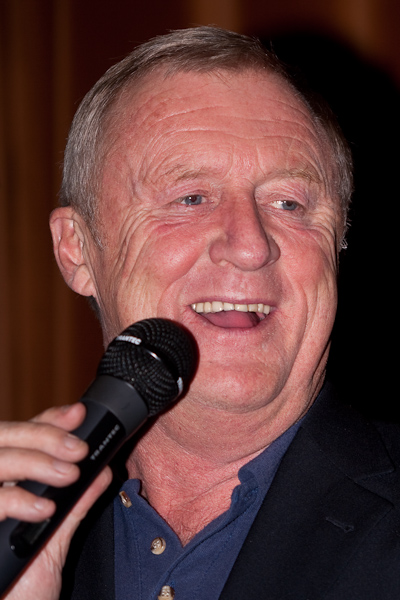
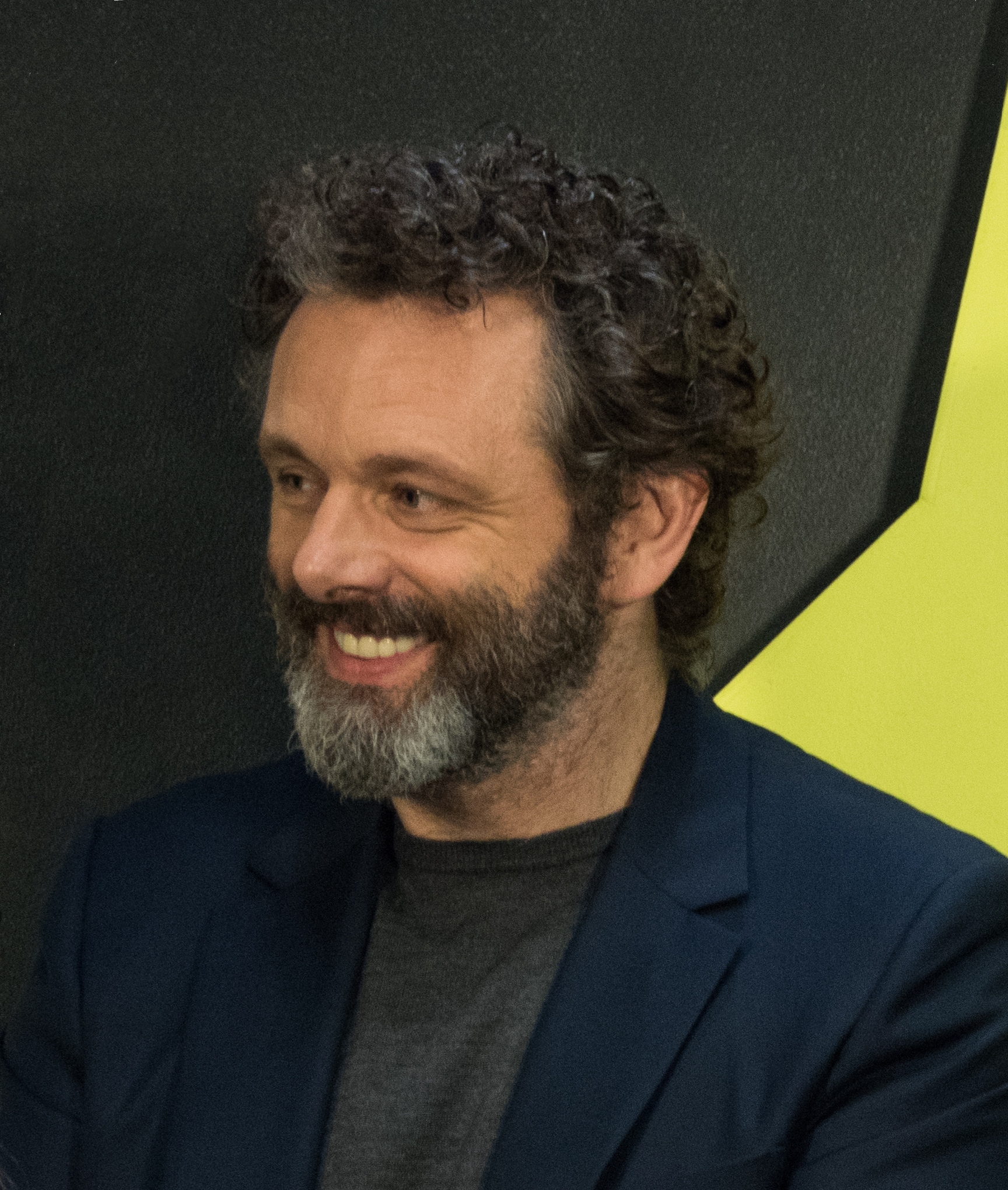
To play Chris Tarrant (left), Michael Sheen (right) had to wear a blonde wig to match his appearance

Matthew Macfadyen and Sian Clifford both attempted to humanize the Ingrams, saying "they were excellent pantomime villains, and they were very easy targets,” for the characterization, they remained focused on the script rather than copying the Ingrams mannerisms or appearances. In an interview with Variety, Sheen said that he gained respect for the role of a quiz presenter.

The scenes in the Who Wants to be a Millionaire? studio were filmed in a set constructed at Wimbledon Studios. Scenes were also filmed outside Southwark Crown Court and inside a former court building in Hammersmith. For Michael Sheen's role as Chris Tarrant, Sheen had to be blonde. In an interview, Sheen said that every day of filming, make-up artist put him in a bald cap, before adding three layers of hair glue and then adding the blonde wig. While filming, Charles and Diana Ingram visited the set to meet the actors playing them.

== Release ==
=== International broadcasts ===
Quiz premiered on ITV on 13 April 2020. In Australia, the Nine Network, which aired both Who Wants to Be a Millionaire? and its Hot Seat spin-off between 1999 and 2023, aired the serial in three parts on consecutive Thursday nights in late 2021. The first part, which aired on 25 November 2021, followed an episode of Hot Seat in which contestant Antony McManus became the show's final winner. In the United States, it aired on AMC on 31 May 2020.

=== Home media ===
On June 15, 2020, pre-orders for a releases DVD for Quiz were available. In February 2026, Quiz was made available for streaming on Netflix. Quiz is also on ITV's streaming service ITVX.

== Reception ==
=== Audience viewership ===
Released during the COVID-19 pandemic lockdowns, Quiz received a large audience, with the first episode being seen live by an average audience of 5.3 million in the United Kingdom. While Quiz was still airing, Ingram's Wikipedia article was one of the most viewed on the site. The combined total audience exceeded 10 million.

=== Critical reception ===
Quiz received positive reviews from critics. On Rotten Tomatoes, the series holds a 95% approval rating based on 36 reviews, with an average rating of 7.57/10. The website's consensus reads, "With clever writing, a slick production, and a pitch perfect Michael Sheen, Quiz crafts a captivating snapshot of a wild scandal that will keep viewers on their toes." Common Sense Media rated Quiz 4 out of 5 stars, praising its story.

Lucy Mangan of The Guardian rated it 3 out of 5 stars. Mangan said that Sheen role was "pitch perfect Chris Tarrant. If you close your eyes, it’s him." Mangan was critical about storytelling from the opening section about the creation of the game show itself, saying its "deeply offputting," but once the focus shifts to the Ingrams it becomes "as addictive as Who Wants to Be a Millionaire? proved." Ben Travis of Empire rated it 4 out of 5 stars, saying that Quiz "makes a near-20-year-old story truly topical." And that its greatest strength is that "there is no final answer." Manori Ravindran of Variety said "the show’s resulting success was well deserved."

Brian Tallerico of RogerEbert.com said that Quiz's biggest weakness is it trying to portray the Ingrams as victims of injustice and dramatizing the scandalous cheating allegations. With Tallerico saying "By trying to be both, Quiz doesn’t feel enough like either. As entertaining as this is in the end, there can be only one final answer."

=== Responses ===
Charles Ingram, who has always denied the charges, praised the series, calling it "balanced". Chris Tarrant was very positive when Sheen was announced for the role, calling him "a brilliant actor. I just hope he is not going to do the sort of Rory Bremner [impression] and all that stuff. I do not think he will, he is an actor you know. Very good, very good." When Quiz released, Tarrant was critical of the show's suggestion that Ingram might be innocent, calling it "blatant nonsense".

=== Accolades ===
Group	Award	Result	Ref.
British Academy Television Awards	Supporting Actor	Nominated	
Broadcasting Press Guild Awards	Best Drama Mini-Series	Won	
Royal Television Society Craft & Design Awards	Editing - Drama	Won	
Royal Television Society Craft & Design Awards	Best Make Up Design - Drama	Nominated	
Canadian Cinema Editors Awards	Best Editing in Television Movie or Mini-Series	Won	
British Academy Television Craft Awards	Editing: Fiction	Nominated	
