= The Making of Music =

The Making of Music is a BBC Radio 4 60-part documentary series on the history of Western classical music from plainsong to the present day. It consisted of excerpts from the pieces discussed and a narration written and presented by James Naughtie. It was broadcast in fifteen-minute episodes on weekdays at 3:45 pm, and followed up at 4 pm with an hour programme on BBC Radio 3 with full performances of some of the relevant works.

The first series of 30 episodes began on 4 June 2007, and was released on CD on 16 July 2007 to generally positive reviews. The second series was broadcast later in the same year, and released on CD in October 2007. The material was also reworked as the book The Making of Music published in 2007.
