= Minerva Theatre, Chichester =

Theatre in Chichester, England

Coordinates: 50.84252°N 0.77771°W

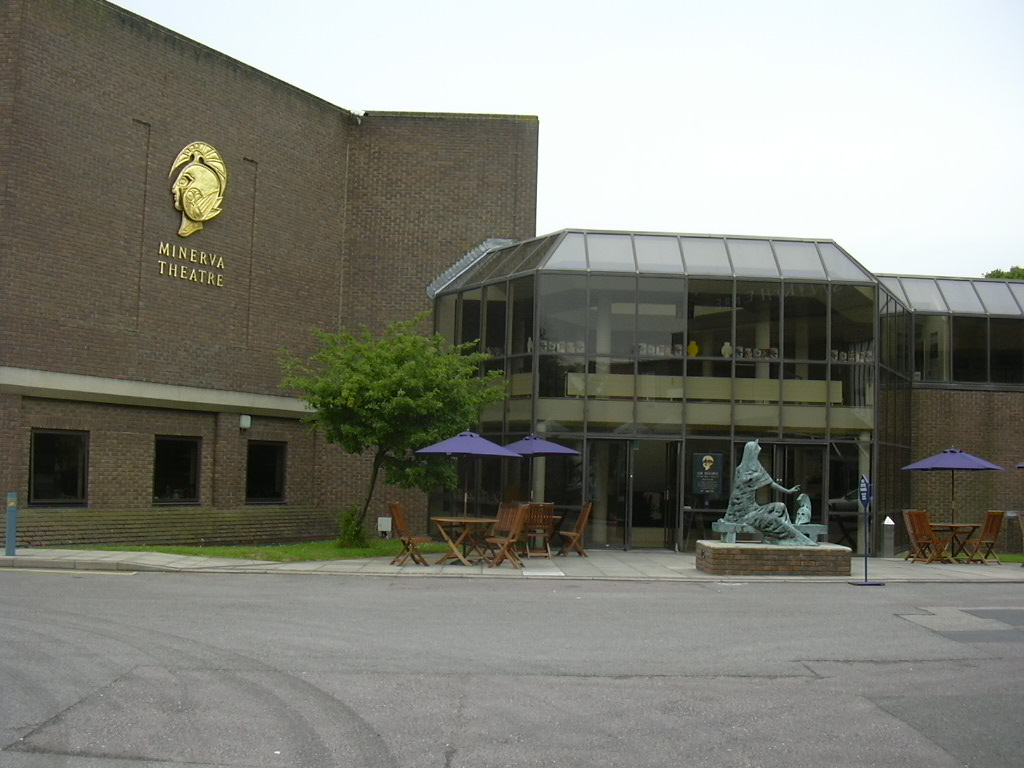
The theatre in May 2007.

The Minerva Theatre is a studio theatre seating 310 at full capacity. It is run as part of the adjacent Chichester Festival Theatre, located in Chichester, England, and was opened in April 1989 with Sam Mendes as its first artistic director. The current artistic director is Justin Audibert.

== University of Chichester ==
In November 2009, The Minerva allowed the University of Chichester's Musical Theatre Degree programme to perform a run of Oh, What a Lovely War!, lasting a week. The show was well received and garnered positive reviews. It was directed by Garth Bardsley, with musical direction by Julian Kelly.
