= List of programmes broadcast by Mediacorp 5 =

This is a list of programmes produced and broadcast on Mediacorp 5, a television channel in Singapore. The list includes those telecast when the Channel was operated by TV Singapura, Radio Television Singapore (RTS), Singapore Broadcasting Corporation (SBC), Television Corporation of Singapore (TCS) and current operator Mediacorp TV, including the HD5 from 2007 to 2015.

== Original programming (local programmes) ==
=== News ===
- News Tonight

=== Drama ===
- 128 Circle
- Crime and Passion
- Crimewatch
- Code of Law
- En Bloc
- Fighting Spiders
- First Touch
- Growing Up
- Heartlanders
- The Kitchen Musical
- Light Years
- Lion Mums
- Masters of the Sea
- Mata Mata
- Moulmein High
- Parental Guidance
- Point of Entry
- Polo Boys
- Premonition
- Red Thread
- The Algorithm
- Triple Nine
- A War Diary
- Left Behind
- P.I
- VR Man
- Missing
- Kin
- Reunion
- Lightspeed
- Incredible Tales
- Titoudao
- This Land Is Mine
- Home Is Where The Heart Is
- Nightwatchers
- The Algorithm
- Classmates
- Tanglin (2015; re-run, 2022)
- Sunny Side Up
- Mata Mata (2013; re-run, 2022)
- The Girl He Never Noticed

=== Game/reality/variety shows ===
Stop: Since April 2020, till further notice.

- Deal or No Deal
- The Pyramid Game
- The Weakest Link
- Sasuke Singapore
- Singapore Idol
- Who Wants to Be a Millionaire
- The Arena
- Asia Bagus
- Asia's Got Talent
- Asia's Next Top Model
- Beauty Files
- Celebrate
- Coffee Talk and Hawker Woks
- Extreme Gourmet
- Extreme Japan
- Food Chain
- Girls Out Loud
- Gotcha!
- i Whiz
- Just For Laughs Gags Asia
- Kopitiam with Dick Lee
- MasterChef Asia
- MasterChef Singapore
- Our Makan Places: Lost And Found
- The Ra Ra Show
- Seoul Far Seoul Good
- Spell Cast
- The Apprentice Asia
- Wish You Were Here...?

=== Comedy ===
- 80's Rewind
- ABC DJ
- Achar
- Calefare
- Daddy's Girls
- Gurmit's World
- Just For Laughs Gags Asia
- Living with Lydia
- Maggi & Me
- Mr Kiasu
- My Sassy Neighbour
- The Noose
- Oh Carol!
- Phua Chu Kang Pte Ltd
- Phua Chu Kang Sdn Bhd
- Police & Thief
- Rojak
- Spouse for House
- Under One Roof
- Yang Sisters
- Fine Tune
- Meet The MP (2017; re-run, 2022)

=== Lifestyle ===
- Chic & Cosy
- My Little Chef
- This Weekend

=== Infotainment ===
- The World's Deadliest Weather
- Amazing Animal Friends
- Weather Gone Viral
- Weird Wonders Of The World
- Alaska: A Year In The Wild
- The Green Planet

=== Current Affairs ===
- Behind Closed Doors
- Creature Comforts
- Generation Ex
- The Grand Dame of Kallang
- In and Out
- Public Insight
- Talking Point
- Work.Able
- On The Red Dot
- Into The Vault
- The Best I Could

=== TV specials ===
- Miss Singapore Universe

=== Sports ===
Stop: Since April 2020, till further notice.

- Singapore Open
- S.League
- HSBC Women's Champions
- Prime League
- Singapore Cup

Ongoing: Continued since 2024, delay telecast

- Formula 1 Singapore Airlines Singapore Grand Prix

== Acquired programming ==
=== Comedy ===
- 30 Rock
- The 5 Mrs. Buchanans
- A Million Little Things
- ALF
- Alice
- America's Funniest Home Videos
- America's Funniest People
- The Benny Hill Show
- Bernard and the Genie
- A Bit of Fry & Laurie
- Blackadder
- Britain's Got Talent
- Canned Laughter
- Cashmere Mafia
- Cheaters
- Cheers
- Clarissa Explains It All
- Community
- Crazy Ex-Girlfriend
- The Cosby Show
- The Days and Nights of Molly Dodd
- Drop Dead Diva
- Everybody Loves Raymond
- Father of the Pride
- Friends
- Full House
- Funny Business
- Glee
- Growing Pains
- Happy Hour
- Help Me Help You
- In Case of Emergency
- The Innes Book of Records
- I Feel Bad
- It's Garry Shandling's Show
- The Jeffersons
- Just for Laughs: Gags
- The Knights of Prosperity
- The Larry Sanders Show
- Married... with Children
- Men Behaving Badly
- The Michael J. Fox Show
- Mind Your Language
- Mr. Bean
- My Big Fat Greek Life
- The New Statesman
- Not the Nine O'Clock News
- The Office
- Outsourced
- Parks and Recreation
- Perfect Strangers
- The Planet's Funniest Animals
- Roseanne
- Sabrina the Teenage Witch
- Saturday Live
- Saved by the Bell
- Sean Saves the World
- The Secret Policeman's Ball
- Seinfeld
- Single Parents
- Speechless
- Suddenly Susan
- The Mary Tyler Moore Show
- The Thin Blue Line
- The Unicorn
- Two and a Half Men
- Ugly Betty
- United States
- Who's the Boss?
- World's Funniest Videos: Top 10 Countdown
- Zoey's Extraordinary Playlist

=== Lifestyle ===
- Famous Foodies
- Luke Nguyen's Food Trail
- Taste Of Australia with Hayden Quinn
- Euromaxx
- Arts 21
- Ainsley's Market Menu
- Clean It, Fix It

=== Game/Reality shows ===
- Survivor 43
- America's Got Talent
- America's Got Talent: The Champions
- America's Next Top Model
- The Apprentice
- Bachelor in Paradise Australia
- The Bachelor USA
- The Bachelorette USA
- The Bachelor Australia
- The Bachelor UK
- The Bachelorette Australia
- Britain's Got Talent
- Classic Concentration (episodes dating from 1991; aired on Channel 5 between January 25th and August 8th 1995)
- Celebrity MasterChef Australia
- Everyday Gourmet with Justine Schofield
- Extreme Makeover
- Good Chef Bad Chef
- Getaway
- The Home Team
- Love Island UK
- Love Island USA
- Love Island Australia
- MasterChef America
- MasterChef Australia
- MasterChef Australia All-Stars
- MasterChef Australia: The Professionals
- The Muppet Show
- Planet Action
- Pussycat Dolls Present: Girlicious
- Pussycat Dolls Present: The Search for the Next Doll
- Style By Jury
- Worst Bakers in America
- Worst Cooks in America
- The X Factor USA
- The X Factor UK
- 1 vs. 100
- American Gladiators
- American Idol
- Baby Ballroom: The Championship
- Breaking the Magician's Code: Magic's Biggest Secrets Finally Revealed
- The Crystal Maze
- The Cube
- Dancing with the Stars US
- Deal or No Deal
- Deal or No Deal (syndicated)
- Don't Forget the Lyrics!
- Dynamo: Magician Impossible
- Ellen's Game of Games
- I Can See Your Voice
- Fear Factor
- Fear Factor USA
- Fear Factor UK
- Hole in the Wall
- Million Dollar Listing Los Angeles
- Million Dollar Listing Miami
- Million Dollar Listing New York
- Million Dollar Listing San Francisco
- My Big Fat Obnoxious Boss
- Name Your Adventure
- The $100,000 Pyramid
- The New Price Is Right
- The Price Is Right
- The Price Is Right $1,000,000 Spectacular
- The Real Housewives of Orange County
- The Real Housewives of New York City
- The Real Housewives of Atlanta
- The Real Housewives of New Jersey
- The Real Housewives of D.C.
- The Real Housewives of Beverly Hills
- The Real Housewives of Miami
- The Real Housewives of Potomac
- The Real Housewives of Dallas
- The Real Housewives of Salt Lake City
- Ripley's Believe It or Not!
- Seconds From Disaster
- Undercover Boss
- The Wall (British game show)
- Weakest Link (American game show)
- E! Entertainment
  - E! Ashlee+Evan
  - E! Hollywood Divas
  - E! Hollywood Medium with Tyler Henry
  - E! Keeping Up with the Kardashians
  - E! Kourtney and Kim Take Miami
  - E! Kourtney and Kim Take New York
  - E! Life of Kylie
  - E! Model Squad
  - E! Revenge Body with Khloé Kardashian
  - E! Total Bellas
  - E! Total Divas
  - E! Very Cavallari
  - E! WAGS
  - E! WAGS Atlanta
  - E! WAGS Miami
- WWE Entertainment
  - WWE Total Bellas
  - WWE Total Divas
  - Beat Shazam
- Wipeout
- Wheel of Fortune
  - Celebrity Wheel Of Fortune
- Who Wants To Be A Millionaire
- I Can See Your Voice USA
- The Void
- 5 Gold Rings

=== Hollywood ===
- Films & Stars

=== Talk/Infotainment ===
- The Kelly Clarkson Show
- The Chew
- The Dr. Oz Show
- The Ellen DeGeneres Show
- Late Night
- Martha
- The Oprah Winfrey Show
- Rachael Ray
- The Revolution
- Saturday Night Live
- The Tonight Show
- Let's Talk About Health

=== TV specials ===
- American Music Awards
- Academy Awards
- Billboard Music Awards
- Brit Awards
- Grammy Awards
- iHeartRadio Music Awards
- Miss Earth
- Miss International
- Miss Universe
- Miss World
- MTV Europe Music Awards
- MTV Movie & TV Awards
- MTV Video Music Awards
- People's Choice Awards

=== Drama ===
- 21 Jump Street
- 90210
- The A-Team
- The Adventures of Sinbad
- Airwolf
- Ally McBeal
- Angel
- Baywatch
- Beverly Hills, 90210
- The Big Easy
- The Blacklist
- The Bold and the Beautiful
- Bones
- Burn Notice
- Camelot
- Captain Power and the Soldiers of the Future
- Charmed
- Chicago Fire
- Close to Home
- Cold Case
- Commander in Chief
- Crossing Lines
- CSI: Crime Scene Investigation
- CSI: Miami
- CSI: NY
- Dallas
- Danger Bay
- Desperate Housewives
- Dirt
- The Vampire Diaries
- A Discovery of Witches
- Doctor Who
- Doogie Howser, M.D.
- Due South
- Early Edition
- Earth 2
- Empire
- Eyes
- FBI
- Felicity
- FlashForward
- Flipper
- Friday the 13th: The Series
- General Hospital
- Glee
- The Good Doctor
- Grey's Anatomy
- Grimm
- The Guardian
- Hannibal
- Hercules: The Legendary Journeys
- Heroes
- Home and Away
- House M.D.
- In the Dark
- Jake and the Fatman
- Jim Henson's The Storyteller
- Journeyman
- Knight Rider (1982)
- Knight Rider (2008)
- Kung Fu: The Legend Continues
- Kyle XY
- L.A.'s Finest
- L.A. Law
- La Femme Nikita
- Law & Order
- Law & Order: Criminal Intent
- Law & Order: Special Victims Unit
- Legend of the Seeker
- Lost
- MacGyver
- Madam Secretary
- Magnum, P.I.
- Man from Atlantis
- Marco Polo
- Men in Trees
- The Mentalist
- Merlin
- Miami Vice
- My Family and Other Animals
- Nancy Drew
- New Amsterdam
- NYPD Blue
- The O.C.
- Once Upon a Time
- The Pacific
- Parenthood
- Party of Five
- Police Academy
- The Practice
- Presidio Med
- The Pretender
- Primeval
- Private Practice
- Probe
- Quantum Leap
- Raven (season 2 aired on Channel 5 in September 1993 as part of its Action Adventures on 5 lineup)
- Renegade
- The Resident
- Revolution
- Savannah
- Second Chances
- The Secret Circle
- Shark
- Siberia
- Silver Surfer
- The Six Million Dollar Man
- Sliders
- Smallville
- Space: Above and Beyond
- Spenser: For Hire
- Star Trek: The Next Generation
- Star Wars: The Clone Wars
- Stay the Night
- Street Justice
- Super Force
- Supernatural
- Terra Nova
- Thunder in Paradise
- Time Trax
- Tour of Duty
- Treasure Island in Outer Space
- The Twilight Zone
- Xena: Warrior Princess
- The X-Files
- Young Hercules
- The Good Doctor
- FBI: Most Wanted
- NCIS: Hawaii
- Hawaii Five-O

=== Sports ===
- Golf Channel
  - PGA Tour
  - Masters Tournament
  - PGA Championship
  - U.S. Open
  - The Open Championship (British Open)
  - European Tour
  - Asian Tour
- Wimbledon
- FIFA World Cup
- AFF Suzuki Cup
- Uber Cup
- Thomas Cup
- Commonwealth Games
- BWF World Championships
- Summer Olympic Games
- Winter Olympic Games
- Youth Olympic Games
- Southeast Asian Games
- Asian Games
- English Premier League
- La Liga
- Serie A
- Bundesliga
- Ligue 1
- UEFA Champions League
- UEFA Europa League
- UEFA European Championship
- Australian Open
- US Open
- French Open
- Formula One
- One Championship

== Former original programming ==
=== Kids ===
Moved to mewatch.sg From 2020

- Alvinnn!!! And The Chipmunks
- Lilybuds
- True And The Rainbow Kingdom
- Mush-Mush & The Mushables
- Orange Moo-Cow
- Sesame Street
- Tumble Leaf
- Bob The Builder
- Transformers Rescue Bots Academy
  - Transformers Cyberverse
- The Penguins Of Madagascar
- Time Traveler Luke
- My Little Pony: Pony Life
- Miraculous: Tales of Ladybug & Cat Noir
- LEGO Friends - Girls On A Mission
- Lego Monkie Kid
- Thomas & Friends: All Engines Go!
- Go Jetters
- Paw Patrol
- Rainbow Rangers
- Zoom The White Dolphin
- Pokémon Journeys: The Series
- DENVER The Last Dinosaur
- Kung Fu Panda: Legends of Awesomeness
- Tall Tales
- Tayo The Little Bus
- Angry Birds
- Croco Doc
- The Smurfs
- Spidey and His Amazing Friends
- Marblegen
- Ollie & Friends
- Whoopie's World
- Mount Emily: Guardians of the Crystal
- Me, Myself and Isaac
- The Rainbow Bus
- Wizards of Honey Street
- Totally Totto!
- Exlosers
- Lil Wild
- Groom my Room (10th season onwards)
- Word Whiz or Slime Pit
- Junction Tree
- Abraeureka!
- Make It Count
- Lunch Box
- Museum Mysteries
- Stickers Together
- Cartoon Buddies
- Basic Mini-tary Training
- Josiah
- The Diary of Amos Lee
- Twinadoes
- Bugsville
- Hoppy & Friends
- SCOOP
- The Adventures of Titou and Dao
- Little Tami's Book
- My Buddy Bonemasher
- The Misadventures of CubeMelt
- Cafe 13
- Mat Yoyo (1983–1993; later moved to Channel 12)
- Scrum Tigers
- Zoom Zim Zam
- Robbie And The Book Of Tales
- Zoom Zim Zam
- What on Earth
- Upside Down
- Argo's World
- Teddies
- Hiccup And Sneeze
- Counting With Paula
- Leo The Wildlife Ranger
- Make Me A Super
- 123 Number Squad

== Upcoming former programming ==
=== Kids ===
Moved to mewatch.sg From 2027

- Kiff (Stars from January 2027)
- Hamster & Gretel (Starts from February 2027)
- Primos (Starts from March 2027)
- Sofia the First: Royal Magic (Starts from April 2027)
- Recess (Starts from May 2027)

== Former Acquired Programming ==
=== Kids ===
Moved to mewatch.sg From 2020

- Wild Kratts
- Ninjago
- My Little Pony: Friendship Is Magic
- Filly Funtasia
- Pokémon the Series: Sun & Moon
- Pound Puppies
- Zak Storm
- Franklin and Friends
- Big Hero 6: The Series
- Esme and Roy
- Butterbean's Cafe
- Gigantosaurus
- Molang
- Turning Mecard
- Inazuma Eleven
- Zoids Wild
- Muppet Babies
- Zack & Quack
- Mirette Investigates
- Guardians of the Galaxy
- Sonic Boom
- Xavier Riddle and the Secret Museum
- Dot.
- Welcome to the Wayne
- Super Wings
- SpongeBob SquarePants
- Zou
- Sofia The First
- Doc McStuffins
- Bakugan Battle Planet
- Beyblade Burst
- Top Wing
- Mickey and the Roadster Racers
- Puppy Dog Pals
- Fancy Nancy Clancy
- Miles from Tomorrowland
- PJ Masks
- Miraculous: Tales of Ladybug & Cat Noir
- Journey of Long
- Polly Pocket
- Clangers
- Becca's Bunch
- Space Nova
- Animal Rescue
- Mega Man: Fully Charged
- Chuggington
- The Deep
- Kongsuni and Friends
- Rainbow Rangers
- Tobot
- Tilda Appleseed
- Sindbad & the 7 Galaxies
- Thomas & Friends
- Coconut, the Little Dragon
- Super BOOMi
- Peppa Pig
- Bat Pat
