= Just for Laughs (disambiguation) =

Just for Laughs is an annual comedy festival in Montreal.

Just for Laughs may also refer to:

- Just for Laughs (1974 TV series), an American comedy anthology series broadcast in 1974
- Just for Laughs Gags, a Canadian silent comedy show broadcast since 2000
  - Just for Laughs (Australian TV series), a 2007 Australian version of the Canadian show
  - Just for Laughs (British TV series), a 2003–2007 Northern Irish version of the Canadian show
  - Just for Laughs (American TV series), a 2007–2008 American version of the Canadian show
  - Just for Laughs Gags Asia, a 2010 Singaporean version of the Canadian show
- Just for Laughs Museum, a museum in Montreal
