= Kieran Doherty (writer) =

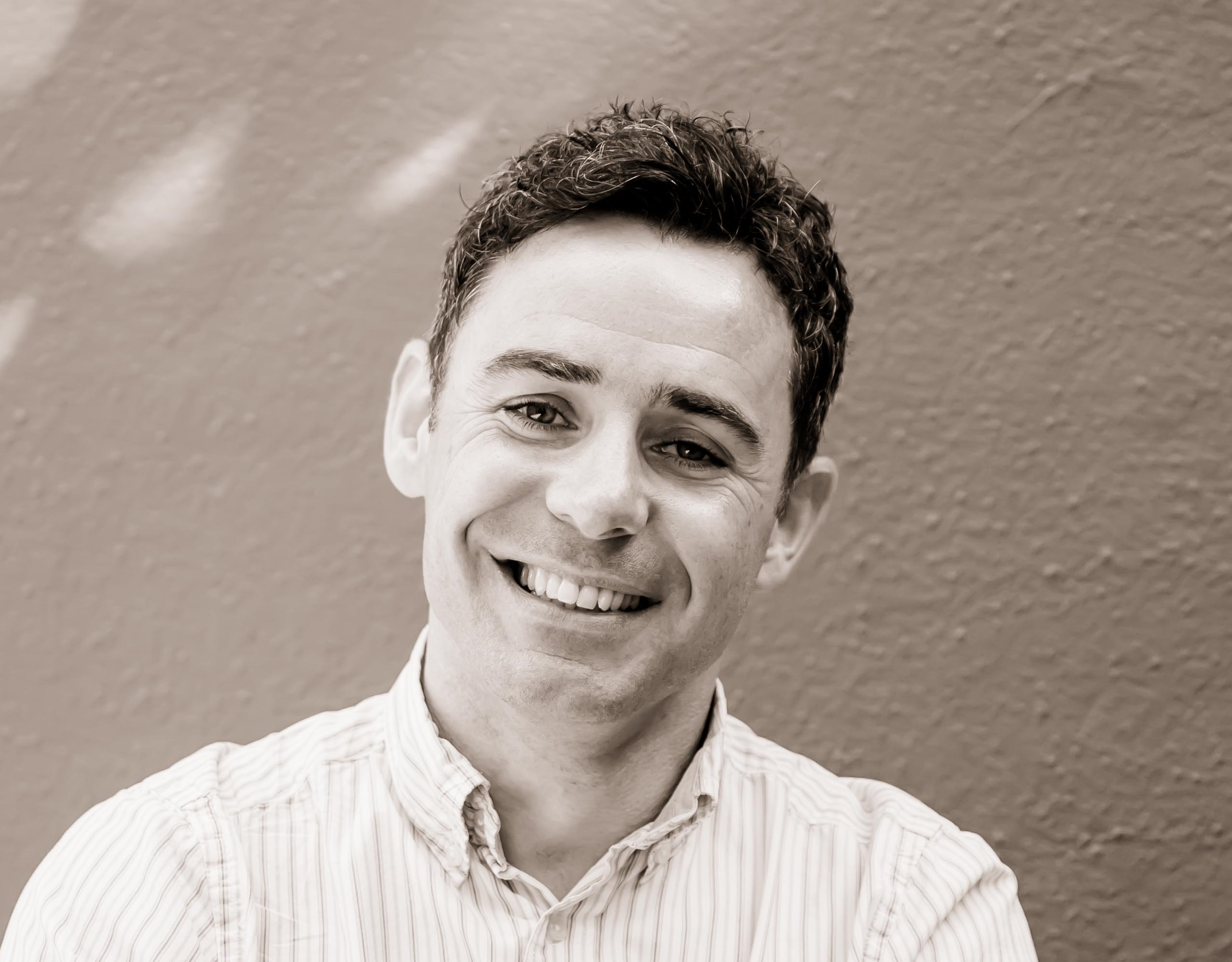
- Born: Northern Ireland
- Occupations: Writer, TV format creator, Executive Producer, Public Speaker
- Known for: Joint Managing Director of Stellify Media
- Website: Official website

Kieran Doherty is a Northern Irish writer, TV format creator and Executive Producer. He is also the Joint Managing Director of Stellify Media, alongside his creative and business partner, Matthew Worthy. Doherty & Worthy have co-created multiple entertainment formats - including the international formats Secret Fortune and Take The Money and Run - while working for UK independent production company Wild Rover Productions. In 2014 Doherty & Worthy launched the production company Stellify Media as a joint venture with Sony Pictures Television. Stellify Media is best known for successfully rebooting Who Wants to Be a Millionaire? with Jeremy Clarkson for ITV, and Blind Date with Paul O'Grady for Channel 5.

Doherty currently serves as PACT director for Northern Ireland and was the former Chair of the Royal Television Society Northern Ireland. He is on the steering committee for The Belfast Media Festival and is also a founding member of the Media Therapy Group, the largest media networking group in Ireland.

== Career ==
Doherty began his writing career in radio, writing two series of The Ulster Way for BBC Radio Ulster.

== Production credits ==
Year	Series	Channels	Role
2006	The Big Bumper Science Quiz	BBC One Northern Ireland	Writer
2008	Sesame Tree	CBeebies	Writer (9 Episodes)
2009	Teethgrinder	BBC One Northern Ireland	Writer
2009	Find Me The Funny	BBC One Northern Ireland	Writer / Producer
2010	Big City Park	CBeebies	Writer (8 Episodes)
2011	Jim Henson's Pajanimals	CBBC	Writer
2011	Take the Money and Run	ABC	Consultant Producer
2011	Secret Fortune	BBC One	Consultant Producer
2011	The David Meade Project	BBC One Northern Ireland	Writer / Executive Producer
2011	David Meade: The Gift	BBC One Northern Ireland	Writer / Executive Producer
2012	Dara O'Briain's School of Hard Sums	Dave	Consultant Producer
2012	David Meade: Make Believe	BBC One	Writer / Executive Producer
2012	The Clandestine	Online Series	Writer
2014	David Meade: Million Dollar Bet	BBC One Northern Ireland	Writer / Executive Producer
2014	David Meade: Crowd Control	BBC One Northern Ireland	Writer / Executive Producer
2015	The Sparticle Mystery	CBBC	Writer
2016	Can't Touch This	BBC One	Executive Producer
2017-2019	Goodbye House	RTÉ One	Executive Producer
2017	Don't Say It... Bring It!	Dave	Executive Producer
2017	In Solitary: The Anti-Social Experiment	Channel 5	Executive Producer
2017	Space Truckers	BBC One Northern Ireland	Executive Producer
2017-2019	Blind Date	Channel 5	Executive Producer
2017	Blind Date Ireland	TV3	Executive Producer
2017-2019	Beauty Queen & Single	BBC One Northern Ireland, BBC One Wales	Executive Producer
2018-	Who Wants To Be A Millionaire?	ITV	Executive Producer
2018	A Taste of Home	BBC One Northern Ireland	Executive Producer
2018-	Gino's Win Your Wish List	Channel 5	Executive Producer
2018	Celebs In Solitary	Channel 5	Executive Producer
2018-2019	Parents' Evening	BBC One Northern Ireland	Executive Producer
2018	Hot Right Now	BBC One Northern Ireland	Executive Producer
2019	Flinch	Netflix	Executive Producer
2019	There's No Place Like Tyrone	BBC One Northern Ireland	Executive Producer
2019	Secret Body	BBC One Scotland	Executive Producer
2020	Pretty Single	BBC Scotland, BBC One Northern Ireland	Executive Producer
2025	Titanic Sinks Tonight	BBC Two	Executive Producer
