= Dara Ó Briain: School of Hard Sums =

British game show

- Genre: Comedy
- Written by: Sarah Morgan; Ged Parsons; George Sawyer; Colin Swash
- Directed by: Mike Bradley; Samuel Wilkinson; Richard Valentine
- Presented by: Dara Ó Briain
- Starring: Marcus du Sautoy
- Theme music composer: Marc Sylvan
- Country of origin: United Kingdom
- Original language: English
- No. of series: 3
- No. of episodes: 24

Production
- Executive producers: Richard Watsham; Katherine Parsons; Phil Morrow
- Producers: Mike Bradley; Samuel Wilkinson; Helen Younger
- Production locations: BBC Television Centre, London
- Editors: Simon Hornbrook; Malcolm Finch
- Running time: Series 1: 30 minutes Series 2: 36 minutes Series 3: 45 minutes
- Production companies: Fujisankei Productions; Wild Rover Productions

Original release
- Network: Dave
- Release: 16 April 2012 – 22 April 2014

Dara Ó Briain: School of Hard Sums is a British comedy game show about the subject of mathematics, based on the Japanese show Comaneci University Mathematics. The programme was broadcast on Dave, was presented by Dara Ó Briain, and starred Marcus du Sautoy. Each episode was themed and Ó Briain, along with a guest or guests, attempted to solve various conundrums set by du Sautoy. At the end of each episode, Ó Briain set homework questions for viewers; the answers could be checked on the show's website.

== Transmissions ==
Series	Episodes	Originally released	
Series	Episodes	First released	Last released
1	8	16 April 2012	4 June 2012
2	8	1 May 2013	19 June 2013
3	8	4 March 2014	22 April 2014

== Episodes ==
A pilot episode was produced with the title Dara O'Briain's University of Practical Mathematics, but this was never broadcast.

The coloured backgrounds denote the result of each of the shows:

Brains	Dara O'Briain ("Brains") won
Brawn	Guests ("Brawn") won
Students	Maths students won (Series 1 and 3 only. In Series 2, the maths students were on the Brains team.)
Draw	Draw

=== Series 1 (2012) ===
No. overall	No. in series	Theme	Guest	Result	Original release date
1	1	The Mathematics of Positioning	David O'Doherty	Brains	16 April 2012
2	2	Location Location Maths	Alex Horne	Brawn	23 April 2012
3	3	How Maths Can Stop You Getting Screwed	Jason Byrne	Students	30 April 2012
4	4	You Can't Argue With Logic	Andi Osho	Brawn	7 May 2012
5	5	The Maths of Italian Restaurants	David O'Doherty	Students	14 May 2012
6	6	How Maths Saves Lives	Alex Horne	Brawn	21 May 2012
7	7	Finding Your Way with Maths	Simon Evans	Brains	28 May 2012
8	8	The Maths of Sport	Andi Osho	Brains	4 June 2012

=== Series 2 (2013) ===
No. overall	No. in series	Theme	Guests	Result	Original release date
9	1	Does Crime Add Up?	Andrew Maxwell; Mark Watson	Brains	1 May 2013
10	2	How Maths Gets You More Bang for Your Buck	Marcus Brigstocke; Josh Widdicombe	Brawn	8 May 2013
11	3	How Maths Can Keep the Peace	Susan Calman; David O'Doherty	Draw	15 May 2013
12	4	How Maths Can Help You Find What You're Looking For	Miles Jupp; Stephen Mangan	Brawn	22 May 2013
13	5	How Maths Can Get You Stuffed	Marcus Brigstocke; Andrew Maxwell	Brains	29 May 2013
14	6	Maths of the End of the World	Josie Long; Alex Horne	Brawn	5 June 2013
15	7	How Maths Can Feel the Force	Susan Calman; Richard Herring	Draw	12 June 2013
16	8	How Maths Can Take You All the Way	Alex Horne; Tim Key	Draw	19 June 2013

=== Series 3 (2014) ===
No. overall	No. in series	Theme	Guests	Result	Original release date
17	1	Maths and Two Veg: How Maths Can Help You Eat Better	Kevin Bridges; Peter Serafinowicz	Brains	4 March 2014
18	2	Yo Ho Ho and A Bottle of Sums: Maths For Pirates	Lee Mack; Miles Jupp	Brawn	11 March 2014
19	3	The Maths of Making and Breaking: Breaking Add	Jon Richardson; Sally Phillips	Brawn	18 March 2014
20	4	Downton Abacus: The Maths of Wealth	Mark Watson; Marcus Brigstocke	Brains	25 March 2014
21	5	Alfresco Arithmetic: The Maths of the Great Outdoors	Josh Widdicombe; Peter Serafinowicz	Brawn	1 April 2014
22	6	The Maths of Balls: Lets Get Spherical	Susan Calman; Andrew Maxwell	Brawn	8 April 2014
23	7	The Prime of Your Life: The Maths of Old Age	Jon Richardson; Stephen K. Amos	Draw	15 April 2014
24	8	Maths of Sport: Maths of the Day	Kevin Bridges; Sally Phillips	Students	22 April 2014

== Reaction ==
Readers of UKGameshows.com named it on a two way tie, the seventh best new game show of 2012 in their "Hall of fame" poll.
