= Kieran Doherty =

Kieran Doherty may refer to:

- Kieran Doherty (hunger striker) (1955–1981), Irish republican hunger striker
- Kieran Doherty (writer), Northern Irish writer, TV format creator and executive producer
