= Secret Fortune =

British game show (2011–2012)

- Genre: Game show
- Created by: Matthew Worthy; Kieran Doherty
- Presented by: Nick Knowles
- Country of origin: United Kingdom
- Original language: English
- No. of series: 3
- No. of episodes: 29

Production
- Running time: 50 minutes
- Production company: Wild Rover Productions

Original release
- Network: BBC One
- Release: 12 February 2011 – 29 December 2012

Related
- The National Lottery Draws

Secret Fortune is a BBC National Lottery game show that was broadcast on BBC One from 12 February 2011 to 29 December 2012. It was hosted by Nick Knowles.

== Format ==
A pair of contestants are given a chance to win up to £100,000 by answering a series of multiple-choice questions in two rounds. All questions require the contestants to select the answer that falls either first or last in a particular sequence (e.g. the first actor to portray a comic book villain in a movie, or the bingo call that corresponds to the lowest number).

Twenty-four numbered envelopes are presented, each containing a different cash amount ranging from £100 to £100,000. The first round consists of six questions, each with four answer choices. Before each question, the contestants select four envelopes. Once the question has been asked, these envelopes are secretly assigned so that the one with the highest value corresponds to the correct answer, the second-highest to the next closest answer, and so on. The contestants eliminate one answer at a time that they believe to be wrong, and the envelope corresponding to each is opened and its amount eliminated from play. The correct answer is then revealed, and the last envelope is given to the contestants without being opened.

The second round consists of five questions, in which the contestants attempt to select the correct answer. Once a question has been asked, the remaining envelopes are secretly assigned in reverse order compared to the first round, so that the correct answer is paired with the lowest value still in play. The contestants select one answer, whose envelope is opened and eliminated, and the correct answer is then revealed. The first question has six answers, and each subsequent question has one fewer until the fifth question, which has only two answers. After all five questions have been asked, the contestants win the amount in the last remaining envelope.

Payout structure

On Secret Fortune, the values hidden in the 24 envelopes typically range from £100 to £100,000. These amounts are displayed on an onstage video wall, allowing the contestants to keep track of which ones are still in play.

£100
£500
£1,000
£2,000
£3,000
£4,000
£5,000
£6,000
£7,000
£8,000
£9,000
£10,000

£12,000
£14,000
£16,000
£18,000
£20,000
£22,000
£25,000
£30,000
£40,000
£50,000
£75,000
£100,000

== Transmissions ==
Series	Episodes	Originally released	
Series	Episodes	First released	Last released
1	9	12 February 2011	16 April 2011
2	8	20 August 2011	8 October 2011
3	12	7 July 2012	29 December 2012

== Reception ==
Readers of UKGameshows.com named it the best new game show of 2011 in their "Hall of fame" poll.

== International versions ==
- United States: In 2011, the CBS network commissioned a pilot of Secret Fortune, with Donny Osmond hosting. The show was produced by Nigel Lythgoe for CBS and Phil Morrow for Wild Rover Productions, the format's owner. The show has not been picked up for a full series.
- Switzerland: In October 2012, the Swiss television channel "SF" started the "Secret Fortune" with the host Roman Kilchsperger. The name of the game show is "Top Secret".
- Sweden: Plans for a Swedish version of Secret Fortune are in progress. Casting of contestants have started. Premiere programme is scheduled for August 2013, on Swedish TV4.

Country	Title	Broadcaster	Presenter	Premiere	Finale
United States	Secret Fortune	CBS	Donny Osmond	Pilot Episode	2011
Switzerland	Top Secret	SF 1	Roman Kilchsperger	October 2012	2018
Sweden	Upp till miljonen	TV4	Marie Serneholt	18 August 2013	8 June 2014
