= Take the Money & Run (TV series) =

- Also known as: The Run
- Genre: Reality competition
- Created by: Matthew Worthy; Kieran Doherty
- Developed by: Bertram van Munster; Elise Doganieri; Philip Morrow
- Directed by: Bertram van Munster
- Presented by: Zen Gesner
- Starring: Paul Bishop; Mary Hanlon-Stone
- Announcer: Bray Poor
- Theme music composer: David Vanacore
- Composer: David Vanacore
- Country of origin: United States
- Original language: English
- No. of seasons: 1
- No. of episodes: 6

Production
- Executive producers: Jerry Bruckheimer; Bertram van Munster; Jonathan Littman; Elise Doganieri; Philip Morrow
- Producer: Profiles Television Productions
- Editor: Eric Beetner
- Production companies: Warner Horizon Television; Profiles Television Productions; Jerry Bruckheimer Television

Original release
- Network: ABC
- Release: August 2 – September 6, 2011

Related
- The Amazing Race

Take the Money & Run is a reality game show that premiered on August 2, 2011, as part of the ABC network's 2011–12 primetime schedule. The series is unscripted and involves contestants trying to hide a briefcase filled with $100,000 from professional detectives and other investigators. The show takes place in various locales around the United States. The series ended with its sixth and final episode on September 6, 2011.

== Overview ==
The contestants are loaned an SUV and a cellular phone, and are given one hour to hide the case. At the end of the hour, the contestants are taken into custody and questioned by interrogators in an attempt to locate the case. The contestants are also isolated from each other for the duration of the 48 hours. The detectives are given the GPS recordings of the route that the contestants took in the SUV, telephone records of who they called, and all receipts. If the detectives can locate the case within 48 hours, they are awarded the $100,000. If not, the contestants win the prize.

== Production ==
The producers are Profiles Television and Jerry Bruckheimer Television. Horizon Alternative Television is the distributor in the United States. The executive producers are Jerry Bruckheimer, Bertram van Munster, Jonathan Littman, Elise Doganieri and Philip Morrow. Kristie Anne Reed and Mark Dziak are co-executive producers. The show was written by Philip Morrow, Kieran Doherty, and Matthew Worthy of Wild Rover Productions.

The recurring cast includes interrogators Paul Bishop, a writer and LAPD detective who has published many books and written many episodes for television and is the supervisor of a sex crimes unit, and Mary Hanlon Stone, a deputy district attorney with the office of the Los Angeles County District Attorney.

== Episodes ==
No.	Title	Original release date
1	"Oh Brother!"	August 2, 2011
Two San Francisco brothers hide the money. Location hid: Lafayette Park; Result: Found with 18 hours remaining after one of the brothers decides to reveal the case's location. In the episode, the interrogators separated and interrogated whom they felt was a "follower", and convinced him that he didn't really want to be there.
2	"BAM! Did I Scare You?"	August 9, 2011
A Miami couple hide the money. Location hid: Robert's House on Miami Beach; Result: Not found
3	"South Beach Sisters"	August 16, 2011
Miami sisters hide the money. Location hid: Bushes near Banyan Trail in Miami; Result: Found with 22 hours remaining because the detectives used metal detectors and flexible prodding poles to search through the underbrush in an area the sisters' GPS route made to appear conspicuous.
4	"Who's Playing Whom?"	August 23, 2011
Chicago domestic partners hide the briefcase. Location hid: At a friend's house in the northern portion of Chicago; Result: Found with 18 hours remaining when a contestant quit under intense pressure. In this episode, the contestant was never permitted to leave his cell, not even to go to the interrogation room. He finally broke when the interrogators took his book leaving him absolutely nothing to do with the long hours. He had already openly complained he couldn't sleep due to the lights never turning off, and he did not eat any of the food provided.
5	"Just Between You and Me"	August 30, 2011
A San Francisco father and daughter hide the money. Location hid: At a former business partner's office in middle of SF. Result: Found relatively early after Mary interrogated the father for a few hours about seemingly unrelated topics. The father began to tell his own life story, and inadvertently gave up his relationship with his former business partner. The interrogators immediately recognized that the partner's office was right along the GPS route. While the specific time isn't given in the episode, it can be inferred the case was found the first day before night fell.
6	"No! No! No! Yes! Yes! Yes!"	September 6, 2011
A Chicago couple hide the money. Location hid: Lincoln Park near zoo in a brush patch. Result: Not found

== Reception ==
The show has received mixed reviews from critics, with Metacritic scoring it a 56 out of 100.
