= UKGameshows.com =

Website dedicated to British game shows

- Website type: Game shows
- Owner: David J. Bodycombe
- Creator: Chris M. Dickson
- Website: www.ukgameshows.com
- Launched: 1996
- Current status: online

UKGameshows.com is a website dedicated to British game shows. The site currently provides information on more than 1,500 British game show formats from 1938 to the present day, over 500 mini-biographies of hosts, along with numerous other background articles.

The site hosts over 5,000 articles, including a weekly news and reviews column "Weaver's Week", written by Iain Weaver, which launched in 2001.

== History ==
The UKGameshows.com website was originally called The UK Game Show Page, a small section of game show fan Chris M. Dickson's personal website. This was set up in 1996 as a spin-off from his popular email discussion list, ukgs-l (since succeeded by a Yahoo Groups list). The page consisted of rules sheets for some game shows of the time, as well as "Chris Compares" programme reviews and various links of interest.

From October 1998, game show consultant and puzzle writer David J. Bodycombe co-founded with Dickson a fuller version of the site, using a list compiled by TV fan Jez Rogers as a basis. The site was updated manually using standard FrontPage software.

With the explosion in the popularity of game shows and the rapid increase in the number of British digital TV channels, the site was relaunched using MediaWiki software in 2004 so that volunteer editors could keep the database up-to-date.

In January 2026, the website was relaunched with a refreshed layout and look, following a period of downtime from August 2025 due to a bot attack on the site's servers.

== Scope ==
The site covers game shows made in the United Kingdom. Imported programmes are not included unless they have significant UK input, such as the Eurovision Song Contest. The site's definition of "game show" is wide-ranging, taking in such diverse styles as pre-school observation games (e.g. The Shiny Show), traditional quizzes and panel games, reality television, and talent shows such as New Faces and Opportunity Knocks. Regional shows (including those made in languages other than English) are included, though typically in less detail than those broadcast nationwide. The oldest television programme featured is Spelling Bee from 1938, which is believed to be the world's first television game show, and the oldest radio programme featured is What's Wrong With This? from 1925. Traditionally the site has included only television shows, but this has now changed and a number of the more notable radio shows are included as well.

In August 2009, the Reading University Student Television production Accumulate! was the subject of the site's 3000th article, thereby becoming the first webcast game show to be featured.

== Polls ==
=== All-Time Polls ===
UKGameshows.com polled its readers on the subject of the greatest British game shows and game show hosts on a four-year cycle. In 2010, the poll was styled "The Gameshow General Election" and timed to coincide with the real UK general election, with the voting window running from the dissolution of Parliament on 12 April to the close of polls at 10 pm on 6 May.

Year	Greatest UK Game Show	Greatest Host
2002	The Mole	Bruce Forsyth
2006	The Crystal Maze	Bruce Forsyth
2010	The Crystal Maze	Bob Monkhouse

=== Poll of the Year ===
Two further polls were carried out in January 2006 asking readers to select the best and worst new game shows of the previous year. Another poll was added a year later, dubbed "The Golden Fiver", for the best game show of the year overall (not restricted to new formats). Both these polls have continued in subsequent years.

Year	Best New Game Show	Channel	Worst New Game Show	Channel	Golden Fiver (Best Show of the Year)	Channel
2005	Deal or No Deal	Channel 4	Celebrity Love Island	ITV1	Golden Fiver (Best Show of the Year)	Channel
2006	PokerFace	ITV1	The Mint	ITV1/ITV2	Deal or No Deal	Channel 4
2007	Golden Balls	ITV1	For the Rest of Your Life	ITV1	Deal or No Deal	Channel 4
2008	Duel	ITV1	The Kids Are All Right	BBC One	Only Connect	BBC Four
2009	The Cube	ITV1	The Colour of Money	ITV1	Only Connect	BBC Four
2009	The Cube	ITV1	The Colour of Money	ITV1	The Cube, Only Connect	ITV1, BBC Four
2010	The Million Pound Drop	Channel 4	101 Ways to Leave a Gameshow	BBC One	Only Connect	BBC Four
2011	Secret Fortune	BBC One	Red or Black?	ITV1	Only Connect	BBC Four
2012	Breakaway	BBC Two	The Bank Job	Channel 4	Pointless	BBC One
2013	Five Minutes to a Fortune	Channel 4	Take on the Twisters	ITV	Pointless	BBC One
2014	Two Tribes	BBC Two	Tumble	BBC One	Pointless	BBC One
2015	1000 Heartbeats	ITV	Freeze Out	ITV	Pointless	BBC One
2016	Dara O Briain's Go 8 Bit	Dave	Alphabetical	ITV	Pointless	BBC One
2017	!mpossible	BBC One	Babushka	ITV	The Chase	ITV
2018	The Button	BBC One	Wedding Day Winners	BBC One	Only Connect	BBC Two
2019	The Wall	BBC One	Small Fortune	ITV	Only Connect	BBC Two
2020	Beat the Chasers	ITV	The Chop	Sky History	Only Connect	BBC Two
2021	The Answer Trap, Moneybags	Channel 4	Gordon Ramsay's Bank Balance	BBC One	Only Connect	BBC Two
2022	The 1% Club	ITV1	Fastest Finger First	ITV1	Only Connect	BBC Two
2023	PopMaster TV	More4	Rise and Fall	Channel 4	Only Connect	BBC Two
2024	Gladiators	BBC One	Wheel of Fortune, You Bet!	ITV1	The Traitors, Only Connect	BBC One, BBC Two
2025	Destination X	BBC One	The Inner Circle	BBC One	Only Connect	BBC Two
2026	?	?	?	?	?	?

== Recognition ==
UKGameshows.com was one of five websites shortlisted in the "TV" category of Yahoo UK & Ireland's "Finds of the Year 2005" awards.

In 2006, a screenshot from the site was altered and used in a piece on the satire site BS News which was also widely circulated as a spoof email, in which it was purported to show a contestant named Kathy Evans on the American version of Who Wants to Be a Millionaire? failing to answer a simple $100 question. In fact, the screenshot pictured 1999 British contestant Fiona Wheeler answering a different (and harder) question. Far from failing at the first question, Wheeler won £32,000.
