= Surprise Sur Prise =

Surprise Sur Prise is a Canadian TV show of the Candid Camera pranks genre. The same distributor also distributes Just for Laughs Gags.

== International editions ==
- France: Surprise sur prise
- Poland: Mamy cię! (TVN: 2004–2005, 2015)
- Germany: Verstehen Sie Spaß?
