= Disney Channel (disambiguation) =

Disney Channel is an American pay television channel.

Disney Channel may also refer to the following subsidiary channels:

- Disney Channel (Australia & New Zealand)
- Disney Channel (Belgium)
- Disney Channel (Brazil)
- Disney Channel (Bulgaria)
- Disney Channel (Canada)
- Disney Channel (Central and Eastern Europe)
- Disney Channel (Czech Republic)
- Disney Channel (Europe, Middle East and Africa)
- Disney Channel (France)
- Disney Channel (Germany)
- Disney Channel (Hungary)
- Disney Channel (India)
- Disney Channel (Israel)
- Disney Channel (Italy)
- Disney Channel (Japan)
- Disney Channel (Latin America)
- Disney Channel (Netherlands)
- Disney Channel (Poland)
- Disney Channel (Portugal)
- Disney Channel (Romania)
- Disney Channel (Russia)
- Disney Channel (Scandinavia)
- Disney Channel (South Korea)
- Disney Channel (Southeast Asia)
- Disney Channel (Spain)
- Disney Channel (Turkey)
- Disney Channel (Ukraine)
- Disney Channel (United Kingdom and Ireland)

== See also ==
- List of Disney Channel original films
