= PLUSPLUS =

Ukrainian free-to-air television channel

- Country: Ukraine
- Broadcast area: Nationwide
- Headquarters: Kyiv, Ukraine

Programming
- Language: Ukrainian
- Picture format: 16:9 (576i, HDTV)

Ownership
- Owner: 1+1 Media

History
- Launched: December 2006 (as CITI); August 4, 2012 (as PLUSPLUS)
- Former names: CITI (2006-2012)

Links
- Website: Official website

Availability

Terrestrial
- Zeonbud: MX-2 (17)

PLUSPLUS (Ukrainian: ПЛЮСПЛЮС) is a Ukrainian free-to-air television channel, part of the 1+1 Media. According to the group, PLUSPLUS is a family channel oriented towards shared viewing by parents and children, when the whole family gathers in front of TV.

== History ==
=== Channel launch as CITI (2006) ===
CITI was a regional television channel broadcasting in Kyiv from 1 December 2006 to 3 August 2012. It was founded by Studio 1+1 and was a media holding of 1+1 Media Group, owned by Ihor Kolomoyskyi. In general, the channel broadcast educational programs of Kyiv and children and family movies and cartoons manufactured by the USSR. The slogan was "Канал TVого міста." (your city's channel). General manager was Natalia Vashko.

=== Rebranding to PLUSPLUS (2012) ===
The channel was relaunched on 4 August 2012 as PLUSPLUS, with new Disney Channel content moved across after the closure of Disney Channel in the country. While developing the program concept, PLUSPLUS collaborated with government agencies, academic and research institutions using government programs, regulations and developments, as well as their recommendations. The channel content is created in a such way as to make it interesting for both children, and their parents.

In 2012 it was awarded the National Television Award "Triumph" in the "Discovery of the Year", and in December 2012, PLUSPLUS launched the broadcasting of Disney programming divided into morning and afternoon blocks, which make up six hours of daily programs.

In 2013, PLUSPLUS has been producing the range of in-house programs, each of which performs educational, training, developing and other functions. The channel has prepared three projects "Fairy Tale with Dad" a 10-minute program where famous dads read tales for kids; "Useful Hints": animated pictures with solutions of children’s problems; and "Happiness Every Day": videos on how to make a kid happy.

On 13 December 2019, the "World Awaits Discovery" brand campaign of the "PLUSPLUS" channel won the gold prize at the "Effie Awards Ukraine 2019" in the "Branded Content and Service" category.

== Branding ==
In 2012, the channel rebranded with the aim of appearing Western European in outlook, with a nod to Ukrainian/Soviet culture and history. The rebrand was completed by Studio.Build, who developed a set of changeable family characters, designed to be the heroes of the channel, with a set of teasers and indents, produced by specialist character-animation studio Animade. They also developed a custom typeface for all on-air and off-air communications. The consultancy worked with Ukrainian illustrator Edik Katykhin.
