= Deal or No Deal (Singaporean game show) =

Television series from Singapore

- Genre: Game show
- Created by: John de Mol; Dick de Ryk
- Presented by: Adrian Pang
- Narrated by: Adrian Pang
- Country of origin: Singapore
- Original language: English
- No. of episodes: 37

Production
- Production location: Caldecott Broadcast Centre
- Running time: 1 hour including commercials
- Production companies: Endemol; MediaCorp Studios

Original release
- Network: MediaCorp TV Channel 5; MediaCorp TV HD5
- Release: 13 May 2007 – 31 January 2008

Deal or No Deal is a game show which was aired in Singapore on MediaCorp Channel 5 and MediaCorp HD5 for two seasons. Based upon the original Netherlands format of the game show, each episode sees a contestant choosing one of 26 briefcases, each containing a cash amount between $1 and $250,000, and then attempting to win as much as possible either by gambling on having a high amount in their chosen briefcase, or making the game's hidden operator, named "the Banker", offer a considerable cash sum for their case regardless of what is inside. The amount a contestant wins is determined by pure luck – cash amounts are randomly allocated to each of the briefcases before each game, with contestants required to open a specific number of briefcases per round of the game to eliminate the cash amounts their chosen briefcase does not contain, in turn affecting how much is offered by the Banker.

The show premiered on 13 May 2007 with a million dollar deal show series from Sunday to Wednesday, after which the show aired every Wednesday at 8:30pm. The show is hosted by Adrian Pang. The second season of the show premiered on 21 November 2007, and increased to two episodes aired per week, on Wednesdays and Thursdays at 8:30pm.

The show's official website has an online game, to let viewers become familiar with the format of the game.

== Gameplay ==
Before the game, a third party (known as an auditor in the show) randomly places the possible winnings in the 26 briefcases, which are then distributed to 26 identically-dressed models who reveal its contents during the game. The amounts range from S$1 to S$250,000. The twenty-six models are mainly professional models, including a former Miss Malaysia Universe, Andrea Fonseka.

After picking one of the 26 briefcases as theirs to keep, the contestant then selects 6 of the remaining 25 cases to open, revealed one at a time. Each amount appears in only one case, so any values revealed in this way are not in the contestant's case. A large electronic board (referred to as the "money tree") is used to keep track of the amounts still in play, with the amounts revealed struck off the board. This is followed by a phone call by The Banker, a silhouette figure lit only dimly from inside a box overlooking the stage, who makes an offer via telephone to Adrian to buy the contestant's case (The Banker's voice is never heard, except for Adrian himself). The banker's offer is primarily based on the mean of the cash amounts still in play, the stage of the game (early offers tend to be far lower than the mean), as well as the player's psychology. Adrian then asks the contestant the title question: "Deal or No Deal?"

If the contestant accepts the banker's offer (by pushing a stylized red button enclosed in a glass case), the game ends and they win the amount of the offer, and the value of the case that they chose at the beginning of the game is then revealed along with the whereabouts of the remaining prizes. Should the contestant refuse the offer (by stating "No deal" or closing the glass case), they must choose five of the remaining cases to eliminate from consideration. The Banker makes another offer, and play continues as before. The Banker's offer may be higher or lower than the previous offer, (if a top prize is eliminated in the round, generally the offer decreases; conversely, if only lower amounts are eliminated in the round, the offer increases significantly).

Subsequent rounds have the contestant withdrawing four, three, then two cases from play. Should the contestant continue to decline the Banker's offer after this point, they then eliminate one case each time (with an intervening offer from the Banker) until two cases are left. If the player rejects the final offer, the player wins whatever is their chosen case.

Each contestant has several supporters (usually three, though it has been increased to four for the second season), who sit in a special section just off stage during their game. As the field of briefcases dwindles, one or more of the supporters are asked to consult with the contestant and help him/her make a decision, such as which briefcase to open next or to accept the Banker's offer or not.

== Case values ==
$1
$5
$10
$15
$20
$25
$50
$75
$100
$150
$250
$500
$750

$1,000
$1,500
$2,500
$5,000
$7,500
$10,000
$15,000
$25,000
$50,000
$75,000
$100,000
$150,000
$250,000

== Homeviewers SMS game ==
During the show, six briefcases are displayed before and after every commercial break. Viewers are invited to guess which briefcase contains a cash prize of S$1,000 by text messaging their answer e.g. Case 3, at a cost of S$0.21 per message. A lucky draw is held at the end of the game from the pool of viewers who chose the correct briefcase. The winners win S$1,000 and other product prizes from the sponsors of the show. On the 26 December and 27 December 2007 episodes, the home winners won S$2,000 on each of the two episodes. On the 30 January and 31 January 2008 episodes, the home winners won S$2,888 on each of the two episodes.
