= Titanic Sinks Tonight =

2025 British docudrama series

- Release poster by BBC Two
- Genre: Docudrama
- Created by: Helen Sage; Rebecca Fairbank
- Written by: Helen Sage; Rebecca Fairbank
- Directed by: Hugh Ballantyne
- Starring: See Cast
- Country of origin: United Kingdom
- Original language: English
- No. of series: 1
- No. of episodes: 4

Production
- Executive producers: Kieran Doherty; Matthew Worthy
- Producer: Rebecca Fairbank
- Production location: Northern Ireland
- Editor: Helen Sage
- Production company: Stellify Media

Original release
- Network: BBC Two
- Release: 28 December – 31 December 2025

Titanic Sinks Tonight is a four-part television documentary and drama series about the sinking of the Titanic aired on BBC Two between 28 and 31 December 2025. The series is based on letters and testimonies from the survivors, as well as interviews they gave in the decades after the disaster. The series places emphasis on the social class and sex of the passengers, as well as the perceived mistakes by those in command.

== Production ==
Titanic Sinks Tonight is a production of Stellify Media, with the support of Sony Pictures Television, Arte, and Australian broadcaster SBS. The four episodes were filmed in Northern Ireland. Executive producer Kieran Doherty said that the series focuses on the human experience and not on how the ship was built or how it sank.

== Narrative ==
The series combines dramatisations and narration with input from historians and veterans like JJ Chalmers of the Royal Navy, Suzannah Lipscomb, Royal Navy Admiral Alan West, Baron West of Spithead, and Somali-British novelist Nadifa Mohamed.

In the first episode, the series chronicles the journey of RMS Titanic up to the collision with the iceberg, through the witness accounts of some passengers and crew, including junior wireless officer Harold Bride, second officer Charles Lightoller, fifth officer Harold Lowe, second-class passenger Charlotte Collyer, American first-class passenger Jack Thayer, stewardess Violet Jessop and the Duff-Gordons (Lucy and Cosmo), among others.

The following episodes focus on the sinking, the evacuation efforts, the panic that ensued after the departure of all lifeboats and how those who perished met their fate, including Captain Smith and shipbuilder Thomas Andrews. The series places emphasis on the social class and sex of the passengers, as well as the perceived mistakes by those in command, while omitting other aspects such as the musicians of the Titanic playing to the last, or the reasons behind the inaction of the nearby SS Californian.

== Reception ==
Hannah Davies of The Guardian gave the series four out of five stars, highlighting the enduring interest and fascination in the Titanic, praising the professional contribution by historians and novelist Mohamed. Davies lamented what she considered a "surplus of testimonies" instead of a focus on the most impactful.

Anita Singh of The Daily Telegraph also gave the series four stars, calling it an "impressively made" and "gripping" docudrama. Senan Molony of the Irish Independent said that the series tells a good story, while pointing to the "confusions in timings and accounts" made by the press in 1912, which are erroneously repeated in the series.

Writing for The Titanic Critic, a publication dedicated to reviewing Titanic-related media, writer Pablo O'Hana gave the series an "unmissable" five-star rating. He praised its originality and confrontation of the more controversial aspects of Titanic history, but noted that some of the CGI and use of AI was "grating." Concluding, he called the show "punishing, chilling, and upsetting," adding that the BBC had "finally done what so many have tried – and failed – to do since 1997: Successfully and effectively put Titanic back on screen with the care and attention that both she and those who sailed on her deserve."

== Cast ==
=== Protagonists ===
- Patrick Buchanan as J. Bruce Ismay
- Gerry O'Brien as Captain Smith
- Adam Rhys-Charles as second officer Charles Lightoller
- Ethan McHale as fourth officer Joseph Boxhall
- Oisin Thompson as fifth officer Harold Lowe
- Jonny Everett as Thomas Andrews
- Matthew Cassidy as lookout Frederick Fleet
- Ciaran McCourt as lead stoker Frederick Barrett
- Parnell Scott as senior wireless officer Jack Phillips
- Tyger Drew-Honey as junior wireless officer Harold Bride
- Ian Davidson as Carpathia telegraphist Harold Cottam
- Rhys Mannion as first class passenger Jack Thayer
- Steffan Boje as Cosmo Duff-Gordon
- Candida Gubbins as Lucy, Lady Duff-Gordon
- Vicky Allen as stewardess Violet Jessop
- Andrew Doherty as third-class passenger Eugene Daly
- Charlotte McCurry as first-class passenger Eleanor Cassebeer
- Killian Filan as third-class passenger Daniel Buckley
- Hannah Wengard as third-class passenger Anna Sjoblom
- Sara Diab as third-class passenger Celine Yasbeck
- Lisa Dwyer Hogg as second-class passenger Charlotte Collyer
- Michael Johnston as second-class passenger Harvey Collyer
- Charlotte Avery as second-class passenger Marjorie Collyer
- Dino Luca as trimmer Thomas Dillon
- Forrest Bothwell as second officer of the SS Californian Herbert Stone

=== Commentators ===
- Martha Newson
- Jeanette Winterson
- JJ Chalmers
- Alan West, Baron West of Spithead
- Nadifa Mohamed
- Suzannah Lipscomb
