= Stellify Media =

Northern Irish TV production company

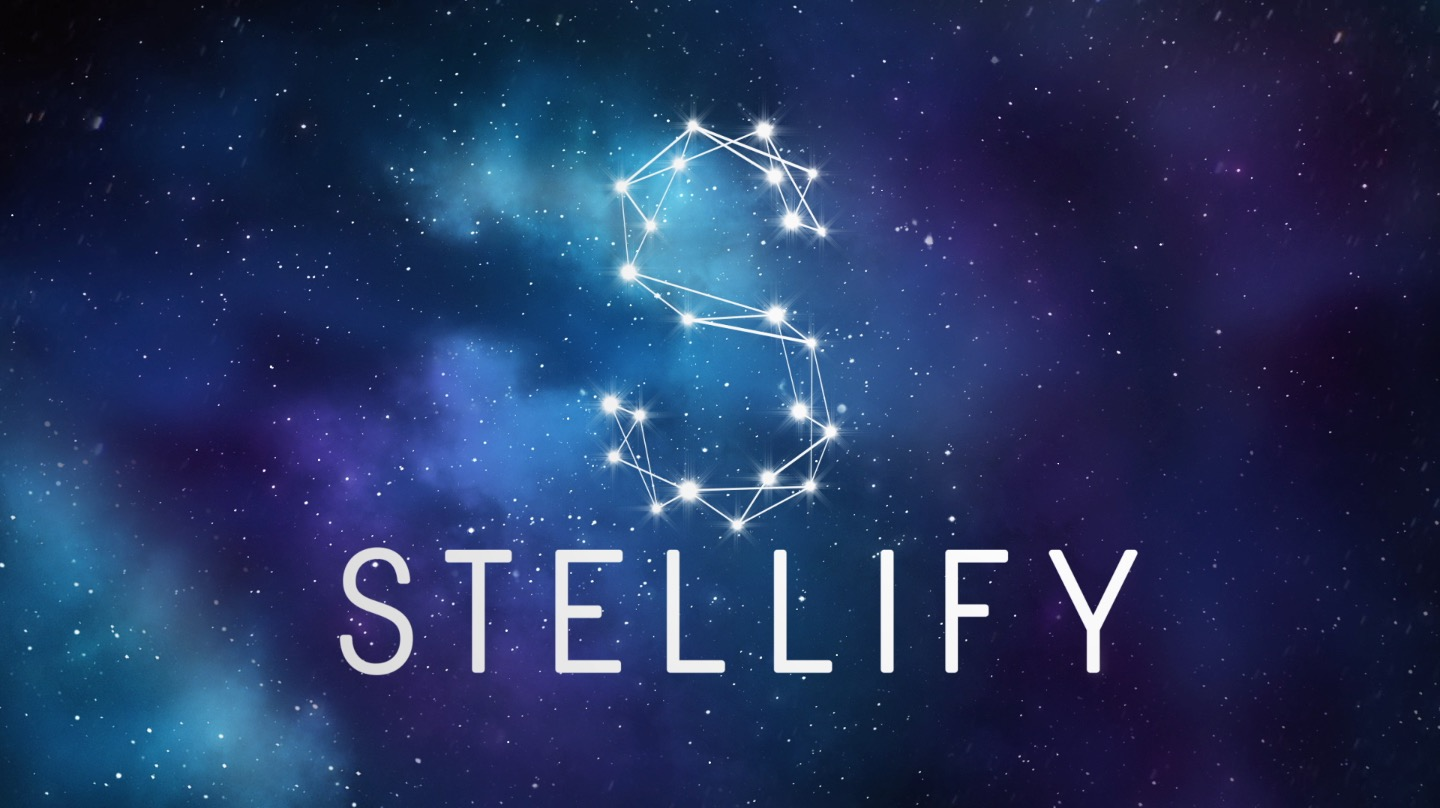
- Type: Joint venture
- Industry: Television production
- Founded: 10 February 2014; 12 years ago
- Founders: Kieran Doherty; Matthew Worthy
- Headquarters: Belfast, Northern Ireland; London, England
- Key people: Kieran Doherty (CEO); Matthew Worthy (CEO)
- Parent: Sony Pictures Television International Production
- Website: www.stellifymedia.com

Stellify Media is a Northern Irish television production company. Stellify was formed by Kieran Doherty and Matthew Worthy as a joint venture with Sony Pictures Television through its International Production division.

Stellify are best known for successfully rebooting the UK version of Who Wants to Be a Millionaire? with Jeremy Clarkson for ITV, and Blind Date with Paul O'Grady for Channel 5.

== Background ==
On 20 March 2014, Doherty and Worthy launched the production company Stellify Media as a joint venture with Sony Pictures Television. Doherty and Worthy jointly develop and executive produce all of Stellify's content. Stellify are primarily based in Belfast and also have headquarters in London.

== List of programs ==
Title	Year(s)	Broadcaster / Platform	Notes
Can't Touch This	2016	BBC One	Physical game show
Goodbye House	2017–2019	RTÉ One	Property competition series
Don't Say It... Bring It!	2017	Dave	Game show involving physical challenges
In Solitary: The Anti-Social Experiment	2017	Channel 5	Entertainment experiment involving solitary confinement
Space Truckers	2017	BBC One Northern Ireland	Factual documentary series
Blind Date	2017–2019	Channel 5	Revival of the UK dating show; co-produced with So Television
Blind Date Ireland	2017	TV3	Irish adaptation of Blind Date
Beauty Queen & Single	2017–2022	BBC One NI / BBC One Wales / BBC Three	Dating reality series
Who Wants to Be a Millionaire?	2018–	ITV	Revival of the game show
A Taste of Home	2018	BBC One Northern Ireland	Cookery series
Gino's Win Your Wish List	2018–2021	Channel 5	Family game show
Celebs in Solitary	2018	Channel 5	Celebrity edition of In Solitary
Parents' Evening	2018–2019	BBC One Northern Ireland	Documentary series
Hot Right Now	2018	BBC One Northern Ireland	Topical talk show spin-off
Flinch	2019	Netflix	Physical game show
There's No Place Like Tyrone	2019–	BBC One Northern Ireland	Constructed reality series
Secret Body	2019–	BBC One Northern Ireland	Documentary-style reality series
Pretty Single	2020	BBC One Northern Ireland	Dating reality spin-off
Celebrity Snoop Dogs	2020	Channel 4	Celebrity property entertainment series
Who Wants to Be a Millionaire?: The Million Pound Question	2020	ITV	Documentary series related to the game show
Barbershop for Bald Men	2021	BBC One Northern Ireland	Documentary special
Fast Food Face Off	2021	BBC Three / BBC NI	Food competition series
Farm to Feast: Best Menu Wins	2021–	BBC One Northern Ireland	Cooking competition series
Fastest Finger First	2022	ITV	Game show spin-off
Titanic Sinks Tonight	2025	BBC Two	Docudrama

== Non-television Productions ==
- Spot The Glitch – a mobile game published to the Facebook Gaming platform in November 2018. Players must search a manipulated photo and identify what has been altered.
- NI Hospice: Lights To Remember – an annual production starting from 2020, commemorating loved ones that passed away while in palliative care at Northern Ireland Hospice. Hosted on the NI Hospice YouTube channel.
- Virtually Impossible – an upcoming virtual reality game show presented by Joe Sugg, set to launch on his YouTube channel. Contestants must navigate an obstacle course in real-life while wearing a VR headset. The VR course is the same in structure as its real-life counterpart, but it features enhanced graphics to make the challenge more difficult.
- Get In The Van – a game show for Channel 4.0 presented by Spuddz and America Foster. Teams compete to find three extraordinary strangers from the tallest person to the person with the most tattoos, to avoid a humiliating forfeit. Co-production with Acclaimed Content. Launching on 10 December 2022.
- Second Hand Style-Up – a Channel 4 show in partnership with Vinted, in which Jorgie Porter and Emma Winder join forces to transform people's wardrobes, all through the magic of pre-loved fashion.
