= Mat Yoyo =

- Country of origin: Singapore
- Original languages: Malay (original version and revival); English; Mandarin; Tamil

Production
- Running time: 22 minutes
- Production companies: Mediacorp Studios; Mediacorp Eaglevision (revival)

Original release
- Network: Channel 5 Channel 8 Suria; Vasantham; Okto
- Release: 20 February 1983 – 2013

Mat Yoyo is a Singaporean children's television programme. Initially it was produced solely in Malay during its first run. This lasted from 1983 to the mid-1990s, was wildly successful and was retooled several times. A second run began in 2012 where it was produced in all four official languages.

== Premise ==
The idea behind the series was created by Goh Guan Siew (resigned 1 August 1984).

Mat Yoyo was announced in January 1983 as part of an increase SBC had in children's programming for that year. It was hosted by Mat Sentul and two "kittens", Yaya and Yoyo. Content included quizzes, games, and a recurring feature on Malay proverbs. Each week, there was a guest star from the Singaporean Malay scene. For the first time in Malay-language children's programming in Singapore, the programme had a live studio audience, which would actively participate in it, such as taking part in games and offering souvenirs to the presenter. In preparation for its 20 February 1983 premiere, Mat Sentul and the two kittens took part at a promotional event at the Orchard Mall on 12 September. A second season was announced in July due for an October release, which would add a new character, SuperMat. An audition took place on 22 November at SBC's reception hall, attracting 100 children.

The third season began on 1 April 1984. After winning an award in Auckland in October of the previous year, the production team had moved to Marine Parade, increased its budget and found a larger studio, which would provide seats for 200 children, as opposed to the 70 of the first two seasons. This enabled more audience participation. It had become a huge success during its first two seasons, to an extent where even family mothers halted cooking for lunch when Mat Yoyo was on, resuming after the programme ended. The lead characters were invited for the 1984 National Day Parade. At the end of the month, a cassette featuring original songs from the series was released. In October 1985, SBC sold the series to Radio Televisyen Brunei.

In December 1986, it was retooled, renamed Aksi Mat Yoyo for its fifth season and removed Yoyo and Pak Mat following the results of a survey given to parents during its production. The removal of Pak Mat (Mat Sentol) was because he was busy in Malaysia. All participants were now students.

It was retooled again in 1989, this time as Kelab Mat Yoyo. A ten-minute dramatisation based on international folk tales was added. A tenth anniversary event was held on 27 September 1992, by which time the show had reverted its title to Aksi Mat Yoyo; Yaya and Yoyo were also restored.

With the relaunch of Channel 12 (as the Malay programming was moving away from Channel 5), Mat Yoyo moved there from January 1994. Yaya and Yoyo made their stage debut at the Young People's Theatre on 18 and 19 March 1994.

=== Revival ===
In November 2011, Mediacorp announced a revival of Mat Yoyo in all four official languages. On 25-27 November, auditions for the English version took place in Okto's WOAH! event.

Hosts were announced in December:

- English: Kim Wakerman (Okto)
- Mandarin: Ya Hui (Channel 8)
- Malay: Danial Asriq (Suria)
- Tamil: Ebi Shankara (Vasantham)

The revived series began in 2012 staggered across the first half of the year: on 1 January on Suria, 5 March on Okto, 1 April on Channel 8 and 29 June on Vasantham.

== Characters ==
- Mat Sentul, known for his prior experience in films, is the host of the original run, playing the character Pak Mat. Prior to Mat Yoyo, he worked at Cathay Keris for twenty years and was the director of Majufilms, a Singaporean Malay-language film studio.
- Zakir A. Hamid took over Mat Sentul (Pak Mat) in season 5 (Aksi Mat Yoyo).
- Yaya is the smaller cat.
- Yoyo (played by Dino in the original run) is the bigger cat.
- Bobo (Djohar A. Rahman) took over Yoyo in season 5.
- Dahlia is a computer introduced in Kelab Mat Yoyo.
- Belalang was a robot that answered questions from the studio audience. He appeared in the Kelab phase.

== Awards ==
- Commendation prize at the 20th ABU General Assembly in October 1983 (won)
