= Who Wants to Be a Millionaire? (British game show) =

British television quiz show

- Title card for the revived series of the show
- Genre: Quiz show
- Created by: David Briggs; Steven Knight; Mike Whitehill
- Presented by: Chris Tarrant; Jeremy Clarkson
- Music by: Keith Strachan (1998–2007, 2018–present); Matthew Strachan (1998–2007, 2018–present); Ramon Covalo and Nick Magnus (2007–2014)
- Country of origin: United Kingdom
- Original language: English
- No. of series: 41 (30 original, 11 revival)
- No. of episodes: 704 (592 original, 112 revival) (Note: This is the number of episodes that have been broadcast as of 17 May 2026.)

Production
- Executive producers: Kieran Doherty; Matthew Worthy (2018–present)
- Production locations: Elstree Studios (1998–2010, 2013–14); BBC Television Centre (2010–13); Dock10 (2018–present)
- Running time: ca. 22–50 minutes
- Production companies: Celador Productions (1998–2007); Carlton (1998); 2waytraffic (2007–2010); Victory Television (2011–2014); Stellify Media (2018–present); Sony Pictures (Note: As Sony Pictures Television from 2018 to 2020 and 2022 to 2026 and Sony Pictures Television Studios from 2020 to 2022) (2018–present)

Original release
- Network: ITV
- Release: 4 September 1998 – 11 February 2014
- Release: 5 May 2018 – present

Who Wants to Be a Millionaire? is a British television quiz show and the original version of the international franchise based on the format. It was created by David Briggs, Steven Knight and Mike Whitehill for the ITV network. The format has contestants answering multiple-choice general knowledge questions, winning a cash prize for each correct answer, with the prize increasing as the questions become increasingly difficult. With an incorrect answer the contestant leaves with whatever prize is guaranteed by the last safety net they passed, unless they opt to walk away before answering with the money they have so far acquired. Contestants are granted a limited number of "lifelines" to help answer questions.

The series originally aired from 4 September 1998 to 11 February 2014 and was presented by Chris Tarrant, airing a total of 592 episodes across 30 series. The original format was tweaked in later years, including changing the number of questions asked, altering the payout structure, incorporating a time limit, and increasing the number of lifelines. ITV commemorated the 20th anniversary of the programme with a special series of episodes in 2018, produced by Stellify Media and hosted by Jeremy Clarkson. This proved a success with viewers and led to a revival of the programme, with new series commissioned by the broadcaster. Two spin-offs have subsequently been aired, Fastest Finger First, which ran for one series in 2022 and a British version of Millionaire Hot Seat which began in 2026.

The programme has seen a number of contestants achieve the jackpot, but has also been involved in controversies, including an attempt by a contestant to defraud the show of its top prize. Who Wants to Be a Millionaire? became a significant show in British popular culture, ranking 23rd in a list of the 100 Greatest British Television Programmes compiled in 2000 by the British Film Institute. Its success led to the formation of an international franchise, with other versions featuring the same general format with variations in gameplay and lifelines.

== History ==
UK presenters of Who Wants to Be a Millionaire?

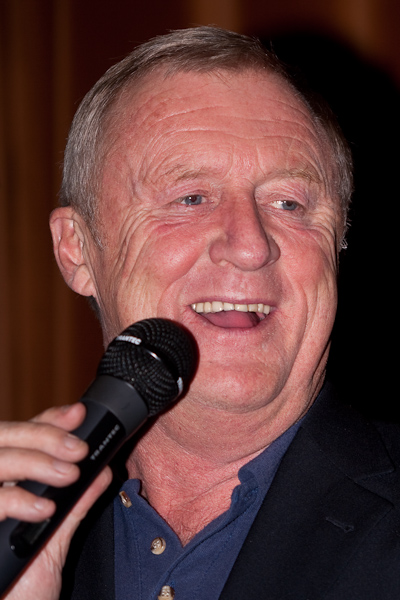
Chris Tarrant (1998–2014)

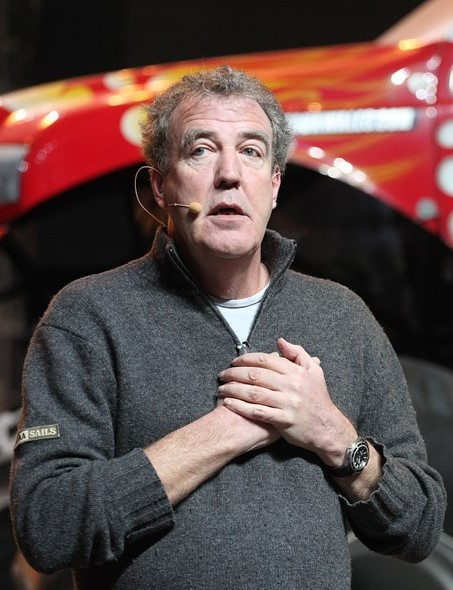
Jeremy Clarkson (2018–present)

=== Creation ===
The creation of the game show was led by David Briggs, assisted by Mike Whitehill and Steven Knight, who had helped him before with creating a number of promotional games for Chris Tarrant's morning show on Capital FM radio. The basic premise for the show was a twist on the conventional game-show genre of the time: the programme would have just one contestant answering questions; they would be allowed to pull out at any time, even after they had seen the question and the possible answers; and they had three opportunities to receive special forms of assistance.

During the design phase, the show was given the working title of "Cash Mountain", before ITV director of programmes David Liddiment decided upon using the name of the song written by Cole Porter for the 1956 musical film High Society, as the show's finalised title. After presenting their idea to ITV, the broadcaster gave the green light for production to begin on a series.

The set designed for Who Wants to Be a Millionaire? was conceived by British production designer Andy Walmsley, who focused the design towards making contestants feel uncomfortable, creating an atmosphere of tension similar to a movie thriller. The design was in stark contrast to the design of sets made for more typical game shows, which are designed to make contestants feel more at ease. Walmsley's design features a central stage made primarily with Plexiglas, with a huge dish underneath covered in mirror paper, onto which two slightly modified, 3 foot (0.91 m)-high Pietranera Arco All chairs were chosen for use by both the contestant and the host, each having an LG computer monitor directly facing each that would be used to display questions and other pertinent information. The rest of the set featured seating spaced out around the main stage in a circle, with breaks in them to allow movement of people on and off the set. The lighting rig used for the set was designed so as to allow not only the lights to switch from illuminating the entire set, to focusing on the host and contestant on the main stage when a game was underway, but to include special lighting effects when the contestant reached higher cash prize amounts. His overall conception would eventually prove to be a success, becoming one of the most reproduced scenic designs in television history.

The music provided for the show was composed by father-and-son duo Keith and Matthew Strachan. The Strachans' composition for the game show helped with Briggs' tense game design, by providing the necessary drama and tension. Unlike other game show musical scores, the music provided for Who Wants to Be a Millionaire? was designed to be played throughout the entire episode of the show. The Strachans' main theme for the game show was inspired by the "Mars" movement of Gustav Holst's The Planets. For the main game of the show, the pair designed the music to feature three variations, with the second and third compositions focused on emphasising the increased tension of the game – as a contestant made progress to higher cash amounts, the pitch of the music was increased by a semitone for each subsequent question. On Game Show Network's Gameshow Hall of Fame special, the narrator described the Strachan tracks as "mimicking the sound of a beating heart", and stated that as the contestant works their way up the money ladder, the music is "perfectly in tune with their ever-increasing pulse".

=== Original series (1998–2014) ===
With the show created, ITV assigned Chris Tarrant as its host, and set its premiere to 4 September 1998. The programme was assigned a timeslot of one hour, to provide room for three commercial breaks, with episodes produced by UK production company Celador. Originally, the show was broadcast on successive evenings for around ten days, before the network modified its broadcast schedule in autumn 2000 to air it within a primetime slot on Saturday evenings, with occasional broadcasts on Tuesday evenings.

Potential contestants needed to enter by calling a premium-rate telephone number and answering one or more questions in the style of the show. The money raised from the phone calls was used towards show prizes.

Who Wants to Be a Millionaire? proved a ratings hit, pulling in average viewing figures of up to 19 million during its broadcast in 1999 (the all-time high was on 7 March 1999, with 19.2 million viewers), though such figures often occurred when the programme was allocated to a half-hour timeslot. By September 2000, viewing figures had dropped to 11.1 million viewers, and by 2003 to an average of around 8 million viewers. Audiences continued to drop, and from 2005 to 2011 the show usually attracted between 3 and 4 million viewers.

At one point in September 1999, an episode had 60% of the TV share and caused the BBC a historic low in ratings. Over the course of his time presenting the game show, Tarrant developed a number of notable catchphrases, including "Audience, all on your keypads please. A, B, C or D. All vote now!", said when the 'Ask the Audience' lifeline is used; "Is that your final answer?", often said to confirm the contestant's answer choice and "But we don't want to give you that", when displaying the contestant's current winning cheque, to urge them on to win more money.

Since its launch, several individuals made claims over the origins of the format or elements of it, with each accusing Celador of breaching their copyrights. In three cases, the matters could not be proven by the claimants – in 2002, Mike Bull, a Southampton-based journalist, was given an out-of-court settlement when he claimed the authorship of lifelines was his work, though with a confidentiality clause attached; in 2003, Sydney resident John J. Leonard made claims in that the show's format was based on one he had made of a similar nature, but without the concept of lifelines; in 2004, Alan Melville was given an out-of-court settlement after he claimed that the opening phrase "Who wants to be a millionaire?" had been taken from a document he sent to Granada Television, concerning his idea for a game show based on the lottery.

One of the most significant claims Celador received against them was from John Bachini. In 2002, he started legal proceedings against the production company, ITV, and five individuals who had claimed they had created Who Wants to Be a Millionaire?, stating that the idea from the show was taken from several elements he had created – a board game format he conceived in 1981; a two-page TV format, known as Millionaire, made in 1987; and the telephone mechanics for a TV concept he created in 1989, BT Lottery. In his claim, Bachini stated that he submitted documents for his TV concepts to Paul Smith, from a sister company of Celador's, in March 1995 and again in January 1996, and to Claudia Rosencrantz of ITV, also in January 1996, accusing both of using roughly 90% of the format for Millionaire in the pilot for the game show, including the use of twenty questions, lifelines and safety nets, although the lifelines were conceived under different names – Bachini claimed that he never coined the phrase "phone-a-friend" that Briggs designed in his format. In response to this claim, Celador made a counter-claim that the franchise originated from the basic format idea conceived by Briggs. The defendants in the claim took Bachini to a summary hearing but lost their right to have his claim dismissed. Although Bachini won the right to go to trial, he was unable to attend the hearing due to serious illness. Celador eventually settled the matter with him out-of-court.

In March 2006, Celador began procedures to sell the format of the show and all UK episodes, as part of their first step towards the sale of their formats divisions. The purchase of both assets was made by Dutch company 2waytraffic, which were then passed on to Sony Pictures Entertainment in 2008 when it acquired 2waytraffic. As the original series progressed, variations of the format were created, and screened as special episodes, including celebrity editions, games featuring couples as contestants, and episodes themed around special events such as Mother's Day.

The Christmas celebrity special in December 2010, which was broadcast live, drew its biggest audience since 2006. To capitalise on this, and breathe new life into the show, only celebrity contestants appeared on the show from April 2011, in special live editions that coincided with holidays, events and other notable moments, such as the end of a school term. Half of the total money won in these shows went into a 'prize pot' for a viewer competition, one viewer was called live at the end of the show and asked a question to win the money. From 2012 to 2013, special episodes entitled "The People Play" were broadcast for three consecutive nights between 9 and 11 July 2012. They featured contestants from the general public with viewers at home playing along. The special was used three more times in 2013, airing across three successive weeks on Tuesday nights.

On 22 October 2013, Tarrant announced that, after fifteen years of hosting the programme, he would be leaving Who Wants to Be a Millionaire?, which consequently led ITV to decommission the programme once his contract was finished; no more specials would be filmed after this announcement, leaving only those made before it to be aired as the final episodes. After the final celebrity editions, Tarrant hosted a clip show entitled "Chris' Final Answer", which aired on 11 February 2014 (see Specials) and ended the original series.

=== Revival (2018–present) ===
In 2018, ITV revived the show for a new series, coinciding with the programme's 20th anniversary. On 23 February, the broadcaster put out a casting call for contestants who would appear on the game show. On 9 March, Jeremy Clarkson was confirmed as the new host of the show. On 13 April, the trailer for the revival premiered on ITV and confirmed that the show would return in May for a week-long run. Shows aired from 5 to 11 May and were filmed in Studio HQ2 at Dock10 in Greater Manchester. The first episode drew an average of 5.06 million viewers, a 29.7% TV share.

ITV renewed the show for a second series, with Clarkson returning as host. It aired for 6 episodes from 1 to 6 January 2019, with the first episode of the series being the programme's 600th episode since it first aired. The second half of the second series began on 4 March 2019 with 5 episodes, whilst a third series began on 24 August 2019 with 11 episodes, airing weekly. ITV renewed the show for a fourth series at the end of 2019, with 4 celebrity editions of the show airing on 25 December 2019, (a Christmas Special), 4, 5 January and 12 April 2020. This series continued for 6 episodes with regular contestants on 10 May 2020.

In July 2020, it was announced that the programme would start airing its 35th series in September 2020. Due to the COVID-19 pandemic, there was no studio audience and the 'Ask the Audience' lifeline was temporarily suspended. It was replaced with a second copy of the 'Phone A Friend' lifeline. It was broadcast across five consecutive nights from 7 to 11 September 2020. It was confirmed on 21 August 2020 that a contestant would win the £1 million jackpot, the first time it had been won during Clarkson's time as host and the first time it had been won in 14 years, which was revealed to be Donald Fear on 11 September 2020. The show returned on 26 and 27 December 2020, for 2 celebrity Christmas special episodes, with the Series 35 Lifeline rules being applied, as well as COVID-19 health and safety guidelines being applied. The first part of series 36 of the show commenced on 17 January 2021, consisting of 6 episodes airing every Sunday, with the 35th series lifeline rules also being applied in this series. The second part of series 36 commenced on 10 July 2021, consisting of 7 episodes airing every Saturday, and concluded on 21 August 2021. Series 37 commenced on 16 November 2021, consisting of 5 celebrity specials, with episodes airing across five consecutive nights. Series 38 commenced on 10 June 2022 – this was the first series to feature the Ask The Audience lifeline since the COVID-19 pandemic.

Series 39 was recorded and premiered in 2024.

=== Top prize winners ===
Over the course of the programme's history, seven contestants have won its top prize of £1 million:

- Judith Keppel – Won on 20 November 2000. A former garden designer, Keppel became the first contestant to win the top prize. She is the only woman to win the top prize. Keppel later became part of a team of quiz experts for the BBC game show Eggheads.
- David Edwards – Won on 21 April 2001. A former physics teacher of Cheadle High School and Denstone College in Staffordshire, Edwards was the second contestant to win the top prize. In 2008 and 2009 Edwards competed in both series of Are You an Egghead?
- Robert Brydges – Won on 29 September 2001. A banker from Holland Park, London, Brydges became the first contestant to win the top prize following the Charles Ingram scandal, which occurred only three weeks prior.
- Pat Gibson – Won on 24 April 2004. Gibson is a multiple world-champion Irish quiz player, and like Keppel, Gibson went on to join Eggheads.
- Ingram Wilcox – Won on 23 September 2006. A civil servant, Wilcox's was the last contestant to win the top prize during Tarrant's tenure as host.
- Donald Fear – Won on 11 September 2020. A history and politics teacher from Haberdashers' Adams in Newport, Shropshire, Fear was the first winner during Clarkson's tenure as host, and the first contestant to win the top prize with lifelines to spare, using only the '50:50' lifeline on his £32,000 question.
- Roman Dubowski – Won on 26 April 2026. A retired IT analyst from Stockport, Dubowski won the top prize with lifelines to spare, having only the 'Ask the Host' lifeline left after using his '50:50' on the final question.

=== Charles Ingram cheating scandal ===
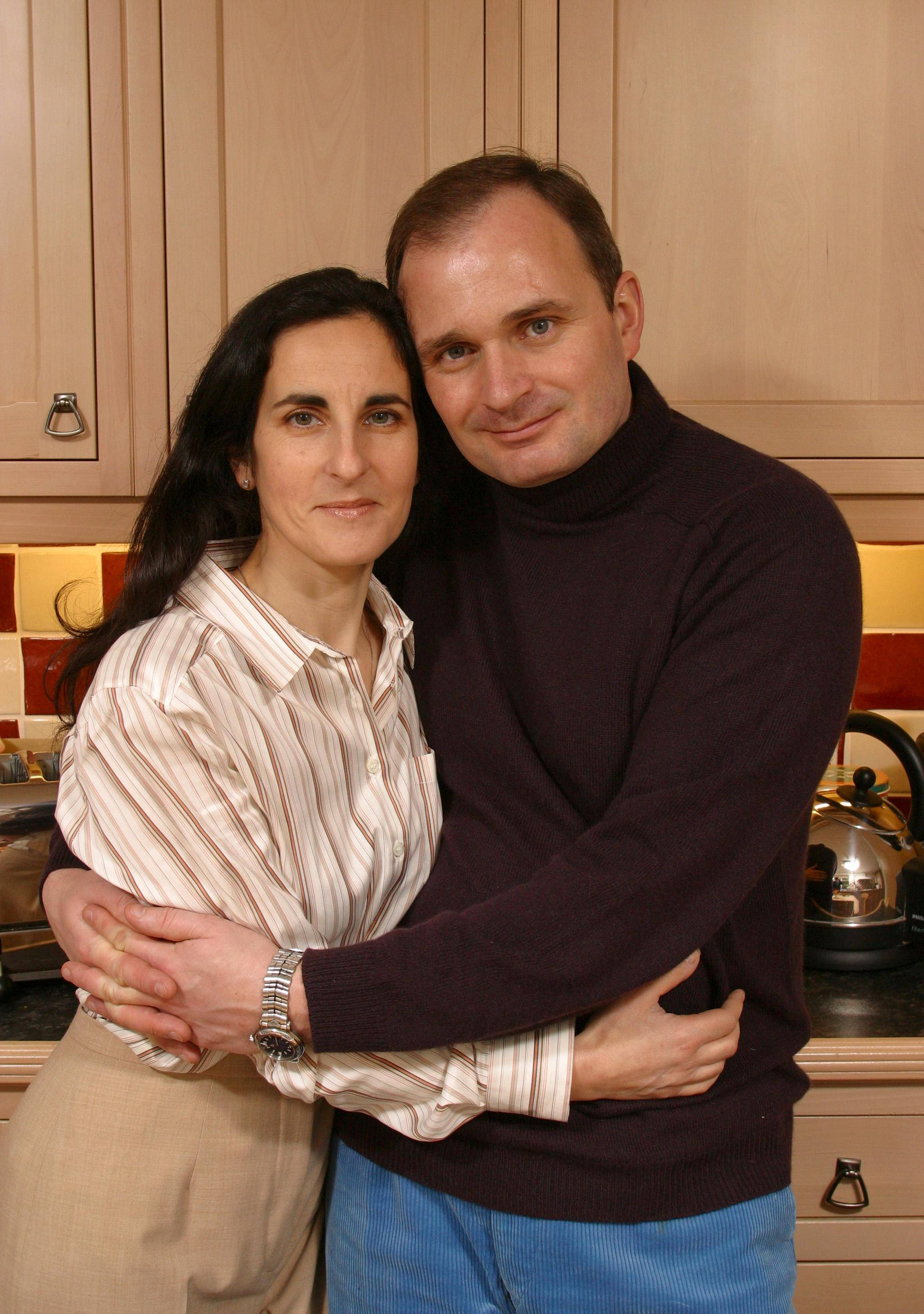
Charles Ingram and his wife Diana. Both had previously made appearances on the show, before Charles' controversial game in September 2001.

In September 2001, British Army Major Charles Ingram correctly answered the £500,000 and £1,000,000 questions, after initially favouring an incorrect answer for each; this led to suspicion of cheating. While reviewing the recording, the production staff made a connection between Fastest Finger First contestant Tecwen Whittock's coughing and Ingram's answers; they also noticed that Ingram's wife Diana had coughed before Ingram changed his answer on the £32,000 question. Believing that cheating had occurred, the production company Celador withheld the winnings, suspended the broadcast of Ingram's run, and reported the incident to police. Both the Ingrams and Whittock were charged with "procuring the execution of a valuable security by deception", and taken to Southwark Crown Court in 2003.

During the four-week long trial, the prosecution presented a recording of Ingram's second day on Who Wants to Be a Millionaire?, pager telephone records which were theorised to be a result of practice for a discarded scheme in which four pagers would be hidden on Ingram's body, and testimony from one of the production staff and a "Fastest Finger First" contestant attending the recording, Larry Whitehurst. Although the defence provided evidence claiming Whittock's coughing was a result of dust allergies and a hay fever he was suffering from, and Whittock himself testified against the accusations, footage showed that Whittock was not coughing when he became a contestant after Ingram. On 7 April 2003, the group were found guilty, with all three given suspended prison sentences and fines. The Ingrams were later ordered to pay legal costs within two months of the trial's conclusion. On 24 July 2003, the British Army ordered Charles Ingram to resign his commission as a major, in the wake of the trial.

In the aftermath of the trial, the scandal became the subject of an ITV documentary entitled Millionaire: A Major Fraud (aired as an edition of Tonight with Trevor McDonald) presented by Martin Bashir and broadcast on 21 April 2003, with a follow-up two weeks later entitled Millionaire: The Final Answer. The documentary featured excerpts from the recording that had been enhanced for the Ingrams' trial, footage of the actions made by Ingram's wife in the audience, and interviews with production staff and some of the contestants who had been present during the recording. None of the defendants in the case took part, with Ingram later describing Major Fraud and a subsequent programme of the matter, shown on ITV2, as "one of the greatest TV editing con tricks in history".

Chess grandmaster James Plaskett later wrote an essay arguing in favour of the group's innocence. This was noticed by journalists Bob Woffinden and Jon Ronson. Woffinden collaborated with Plaskett on a book titled Bad Show: The Quiz, The Cough, The Millionaire Major, published in 2015, arguing that Ingram's appearance on the show coinciding with Whittock's was "chance".

Quiz, a 2017 play based on the events of the scandal, was written by James Graham, and a TV adaptation was commissioned by ITV starring Matthew Macfadyen, Michael Sheen and Sian Clifford, which aired in April 2020.

=== Top prize losers ===
Over the course of the programme's history, one contestant has reached the £1 million question, but answered incorrectly:

- Nicholas Bennett – Missed the million pound question on 25 May 2025. A data analyst from West Hampstead, Bennett became the first person on the British version of Millionaire to miss the million pound question. He ultimately left with £125,000, after losing £375,000 and becoming the contestant with the largest loss in the show's history.

==== Bowens' appearance ====
On 11 February 2006, Laurence Llewelyn-Bowen and his wife, Jackie Bowen, initially appeared on a celebrity couples edition of the show to celebrate Valentine's Day. The pair had reached the million pound question, but answered incorrectly, losing £468,000 and initially leaving with £32,000. They had been asked; "Translated from the Latin, what is the motto of the United States?", to which the Bowens answered with "In God We Trust", only to learn that the question's correct answer was "One Out of Many"— the English translation for the Latin E pluribus unum. However, Celador later admitted that the question had been ambiguous and not fair to the pair—to wit, although E pluribus unum is considered the de facto motto of the United States, it was never legally declared as such, while In God We Trust has been the official motto of the country since 1956, but was not translated from any form of Latin. The couple were invited back to play a second million pound question and walked away with £500,000 for their charity, Shooting Star Chase Children's Hospice, becoming the highest-winning celebrity contestants.

== Format ==
=== Game rules ===
Payout structure ("money tree")
Original series				Revival series	
1998–2007		2007–2014		2018–present	
Question number	Question value	Question number	Question value	Question number	Question value
15	£1,000,000	12	£1,000,000	15	£1,000,000
14	£500,000	11	£500,000	14	£500,000
13	£250,000	10	£250,000	13	£250,000
12	£125,000	9	£150,000	12	£125,000
11	£64,000	8	£75,000	11	£64,000
10	£32,000	7	£50,000	10	£32,000
9	£16,000	6	£20,000	9	£16,000
8	£8,000	5	£10,000	8	£8,000
7	£4,000	4	£5,000	7	£4,000
6	£2,000	3	£2,000	6	£2,000
5	£1,000	2	£1,000	5	£1,000
4	£500	1	£500	4	£500
3	£300	—		3	£300
2	£200	—		2	£200
1	£100	—		1	£100
Milestone Custom milestone Top prize

Once contestants audition for a part on the programme and filming takes place, they undertake a preliminary round called "Fastest Finger First". Initially, the round required contestants to provide the correct answer to a question, but from the second series onwards, they are tasked with organising four answers in a specific sequence stated within the question (e.g. earliest to latest), after time up, the host will reveal result. The contestant who answers the question correctly, and in the fastest time, plays the main game. In the event that nobody answers the question correctly, a new question is asked. If two or more contestants gave the correct sequence in the same fastest time, a tiebreaker question is held between them to determine who proceeds to the main game. The round is used to determine the next contestant for the main game, and is typically played more than once per episode. In the event there are visually impaired contestants, the answers and the letters they correspond to will be read out before the timer starts.

After completing 'Fastest Finger First', the contestant begins the main game, tackling a series of increasingly difficult questions. The questions are valued at progressively higher sums of money, up to the top prize of £1,000,000. The stacks of 15 questions are randomly chosen from a list of pre-generated questions based on general knowledge. For each question there are four options to choose from, labelled 'A', 'B', 'C' and 'D'. During the game, contestants are allowed to use three lifelines to help them with a question at any time, and two monetary milestones are provided. If a contestant answers a question incorrectly, but previously passed a milestone during their game, they leave with that capped amount as their prize.

Contestants are allowed to 'walk away' from any question, leaving the game with the cash amount they had already banked. While the initial questions are generally easy, more challenging questions require the contestant to confirm that their answer is final, at which point their submission becomes locked in and cannot be reversed. As a rule, the presenter is not shown the correct answer on their monitor until a contestant has given their 'final answer'. If the episode has reached the end of its allotted time, an audio 'klaxon' is cued to highlight this; contestants who are still playing would return in the next episode to complete their progress. For special editions of the show, such as celebrity episodes, this is not the case and the contestant leaves with their banked amount. During the live specials whilst Tarrant was host, the contestant's game ended and any question in play would be null and void unless they gave a final answer before the klaxon sounded.

Over the course of the show's history on British television, the format of the programme has seen various changes to gameplay, mainly towards the setup of questions and the payout structure used in the show, along with minor tweaks and changes in other aspects:

- Between September 1998 and July 2007, the original format focused on fifteen questions, with all three lifelines available at the start of the game, two milestones placed at £1,000 and £32,000, and ten contestants given the opportunity to participate in each episode.
- Between August 2007 and February 2014, the number of questions was reduced to twelve, with most cash values adjusted; the second milestone was also adjusted to £50,000 as a result.
- Between August 2010 and February 2014, contestants were pre-selected by production staff, and were given a time limit on the first seven questions, similar to the American 'clock format' between 2008 and 2010. The clock would begin once all answers were displayed—15 seconds for the first two questions, 30 seconds for the next five questions—and would pause when a lifeline was used. This format also included a fourth lifeline, 'Switch'. Also during this era, there were no Fastest Finger First rounds.
- From 2011 to 2014, most episodes were live celebrity specials; in these episodes a minor adjustment was made to Phone a Friend.
- From 2018 onwards, the show's revival returned to the original 1998–2007 format, with some differences. The number of 'Fastest Finger First' contestants was reduced to six and a new 'Ask the Host' lifeline was introduced. A major change involved contestants customising where the second milestone could be placed after reaching £1,000. Between the sixth and thirteenth questions, before the question is presented, the host would ask if the contestant wanted to set the upcoming question as a safe haven.

Contestants must be British citizens or legal residents.

=== Lifelines ===
Contestants may make use of lifelines during the game to assist them with a question. Each lifeline can only be used once, although they can be used in any order and a contestant can use more than one on a single question if they so wish. Throughout the course of the show's history, these lifelines have involved the following:

- 50:50 (1998–present): Two random incorrect answers are eliminated, leaving the correct answer and a remaining incorrect answer, thus granting the contestant a 50/50 chance of answering the question correctly.
- Phone a Friend (1998–present): The contestant calls one of their friends, and has 30 seconds to read the question and answers to them. The friend uses the leftover time to offer an answer.
  - Since 2011, a member of the production team accompanies the friend to prevent cheating, such as reading books or looking online. Since 2018, they have been verified by the presenter before the contestant can continue.
  - During the 2012–13 specials, friends were accompanied to production and filmed, and both the friend and contestant were able to see and communicate with each other.
  - If a contestant is visually impaired, the presenter will read out the question and answers to the friend on the contestant's behalf.
- Ask the Audience (1998–2020, 2022–present): Audience members use keypads to vote on what they believe to be the correct answer to the question they've been asked. The percentage of each option selected by the audience is displayed to the contestant and audience after this vote.
  - From 2020 to 2021, this lifeline was temporarily suspended because the COVID-19 pandemic prevented a studio audience being present during filming; in its absence, the lifeline was replaced with a second Phone a Friend for contestants to use. Contestants were not allowed to phone the same friend twice.
- Switch/Flip the Question (2002–2003, 2010–2014): The question is replaced with another question of the same monetary value. Any lifelines already used on the original question are not reinstated.
  - In its original run, the lifeline was called Flip and could only be accessed if the contestant traded an unused lifeline for it, using it up to three times. From 2010 to 2014, it became a unique lifeline and was accessible after the contestant answered seven questions correctly.
- Ask the Host (2018–present): The contestant consults the host for guidance on the question. The host usually discloses that they have no contact with outside sources, and there is no time limit as to how long they can offer help. When a question is answered, the correct answer is revealed to the host and contestant at the same time.

== Series overview ==
=== Main series ===
Series	Start date	End date	Episodes	Presenter
1	4 September 1998	25 December 1998	11	Chris Tarrant
2	1 January 1999	13 January 1999	13	Chris Tarrant
3	5 March 1999	16 March 1999	12	Chris Tarrant
4	3 September 1999	14 September 1999	13	Chris Tarrant
5	5 November 1999	25 December 1999	17	Chris Tarrant
6	16 January 2000	22 January 2000	7	Chris Tarrant
7	26 March 2000	1 May 2000	13	Chris Tarrant
8	7 September 2000	6 January 2001	55	Chris Tarrant
9	8 January 2001	26 April 2001	45	Chris Tarrant
10	4 September 2001	29 December 2001	43	Chris Tarrant
11	5 January 2002	9 April 2002	55	Chris Tarrant
12	31 August 2002	28 December 2002	19	Chris Tarrant
13	4 January 2003	31 May 2003	22	Chris Tarrant
14	30 August 2003	27 December 2003	21	Chris Tarrant
15	3 January 2004	5 June 2004	23	Chris Tarrant
16	18 September 2004	25 December 2004	16	Chris Tarrant
17	1 January 2005	11 June 2005	24	Chris Tarrant
18	17 September 2005	31 December 2005	11	Chris Tarrant
19	7 January 2006	8 July 2006	27	Chris Tarrant
20	9 September 2006	6 January 2007	13	Chris Tarrant
21	10 March 2007	28 July 2007	17	Chris Tarrant
22	18 August 2007	30 October 2007	11	Chris Tarrant
23	1 January 2008	3 June 2008	19	Chris Tarrant
24	16 August 2008	31 January 2009	18	Chris Tarrant
25	13 June 2009	20 December 2009	20	Chris Tarrant
26	13 April 2010	8 June 2010	8	Chris Tarrant
27	3 August 2010	23 December 2010	11	Chris Tarrant
28	2 April 2011	19 December 2011	6	Chris Tarrant
29	3 January 2012	20 December 2012	11	Chris Tarrant
30	1 January 2013	11 February 2014	11	Chris Tarrant
31	5 May 2018	11 May 2018	7	Jeremy Clarkson
32	1 January 2019	6 January 2019	11	Jeremy Clarkson
32	4 March 2019	8 March 2019	11	Jeremy Clarkson
33	24 August 2019	20 October 2019	11	Jeremy Clarkson
34	25 December 2019		10	Jeremy Clarkson
34	4 January 2020	5 January 2020	10	Jeremy Clarkson
34	12 April 2020		10	Jeremy Clarkson
34	10 May 2020	15 May 2020	10	Jeremy Clarkson
35	7 September 2020	11 September 2020	7	Jeremy Clarkson
35	26 December 2020	27 December 2020	7	Jeremy Clarkson
36	17 January 2021	21 February 2021	13	Jeremy Clarkson
36	10 July 2021	21 August 2021	13	Jeremy Clarkson
37	16 November 2021	19 November 2021	6	Jeremy Clarkson
37	28 November 2021		6	Jeremy Clarkson
37	10 June 2022		6	Jeremy Clarkson
38	3 September 2022	30 October 2022	13	Jeremy Clarkson
38	3 November 2024	1 December 2024	13	Jeremy Clarkson
38	29 December 2024		13	Jeremy Clarkson
39	28 January 2024	17 March 2024	11	Jeremy Clarkson
39	29 September 2024	20 October 2024	11	Jeremy Clarkson
40	26 January 2025	23 March 2025	17	Jeremy Clarkson
40	4 May 2025	25 May 2025	17	Jeremy Clarkson
40	22 February 2026	22 March 2026	17	Jeremy Clarkson
41	26 December 2025		TBA	Jeremy Clarkson
41	26 April 2026	TBA	TBA	Jeremy Clarkson

=== Specials ===
- Is that Your Final Answer? – a one-hour documentary about the show, which aired on ITV on 24 December 1999. Directed and produced by Robin Lough, it featured footage from the unaired pilot programme, and behind the scenes footage from Series 4 (September 1999).
- Who Wants to Be a Millionaire Night – a two-and-a-half-hour long special, which included parts of Is that Your Final Answer?, that aired on channel ITV2 in 2000. Hosted by Tarrant, it looked back on the first two years of the UK version. It also looked at the U.S. and Australian versions.
- Judith Keppel: Millionaire – a half-hour documentary about Judith Keppel's run to winning the million pound top prize, which aired on ITV on 31 December 2000.
- Who Wants to be a Millionaire?: Major Fraud – A special episode of Tonight which focused on the 2001 cheating scandal, hosted by Martin Bashir. It featured key segments of Charles Ingram's run as well as interviews by the witnesses of the ensuing trial, such as fellow contestants and members of the production crew. It was broadcast in the UK on 21 April 2003 (before airing in the US on 8 May 2003 as a special episode of ABC News' Primetime). An additional 2-hour documentary on the scandal entitled Who Wants to Steal a Million? was also shown in the US, which featured Ingram's full unedited run, as well as some of the footage from this documentary.
- Who Wants to be a Millionaire?: Chris's Final Answer – A series finale to the original series in 2014, after ITV announced that the series would end. It was a clip show which featured the favourite moments of Tarrant and the producers of the show. It included Chris' opinions on the international host of the show (focusing on the Japanese host, Monta Mino), Major Ingram's scandal, and the moment John Carpenter used Phone-a-Friend to let his dad know he's going to win the million on the American version, as well as becoming the franchise's first top prize winner.
- Quiz – A drama in three parts, each one hour in length, which aired on 13, 14 and 15 April 2020 and is based on James Graham's play of the same name which centres on the 2001 Ingram cheating scandal.
- Who Wants to be a Millionaire?: The Million Pound Question – a six-part documentary series about the first six recorded contestants who correctly answered the million pound question, including Charles Ingram's scandal (under the title Who Wants to be a Millionaire?: A Very Major Scandal). The series also included other moments from the show's archives. It was shown across six weeks from November 2020 – January 2021. It is narrated by Stephen Mangan.

== Text games ==
On 23 October 2004 the show included a feature called the "Walkaway Text Game". The competition was offered to viewers at home to play where they answered the question, if a contestant decided to walk home with the cash prize they have got, by send the letter 'A, B, C or D' within 30 seconds to a specific mobile number. A viewer who answered the question correctly won £1,000 by having their entry selected randomly.

Starting from 9 September 2006, there were some changes where it was played before some commercial breaks. A question to which the contestant had given their final answer, but to which the correct answer had not yet been revealed was offered as a competition to viewers. Entry was via SMS text message at a cost of £1 per entry, and the competition ran through the commercial break, after which the answer was revealed and the game continued. One viewer who answered the question correctly won £1,000. The text game ended on 28 July 2007.

With the premiere of the 12-question format on 18 August 2007, a new viewer competition was introduced, known as "Tonight's Viewer Question", with a completely new question being asked exclusively to home viewers, usually after the first contestant of the episode had correctly answered their second question. Entrants would have to text "GAME" followed by the letter "A", "B", "C" or "D" to a specific mobile number at a cost of £1 plus the standard mobile network rate, with entrants having to be at least 16 years old. The question would be repeated before each commercial break, and the correct answer revealed at the end of the episode. £1,000 was awarded randomly to a viewer who texted the correct answer. The game ended on 8 June 2010.

With the arrival of the clock format on 3 August 2010, the viewer competition was again modified. The question would no longer be read out on television, instead entrants were directed to a page on ITV's website, and the prize was increased to a cumulative "viewer prize pot" based on the sum of the total prize amounts won by the contestants in that episode (e.g. if three contestants appeared and one won £10,000 with another two winning £1,000, the final viewer prize would be £12,000).

== Controversies ==
=== Incorrect answer to question accepted ===
On 8 March 1999, contestant Tony Kennedy reached the £64,000 question. He was asked "Theoretically, what is the minimum number of strokes with which a tennis player can win a set?", and given four possible answers: twelve, twenty-four, thirty-six, and forty-eight. Kennedy, who calculated that a player would need four shots to win a game, with six games in a set, answered twenty-four, and was told the answer was correct. However, the right answer is actually twelve. One viewer explained to The Irish Times:

"A tennis player needs six games to win a set. Let's assume he serves aces for his three service games—four shots for three games which equals 12 strokes. Now, if his opponent double faults all their serves ... the player hasn't had to make any strokes."

The discrepancy stems from the fact that while twenty-four is indeed the minimum number of points a tennis player needs to win in order to claim a set, the question specifically asks what the minimum number of strokes was, which is indeed twelve. The production staff acknowledged the mistake and apologised for it, but allowed Kennedy to keep his prize money (an eventual £125,000).

=== Career criminal contestants ===
On 30 July 1999, production staff withdrew the winnings of three contestants who had appeared in the programme between January and March, after each was discovered to be an active criminal, one of whom was wanted by police. After each had appeared on the programme, several viewers contacted staff to report about their criminal past, leading to their winnings, a combined total of over £80,000, being frozen until the allegations were checked. They eventually discovered that all three had lied on their application forms, breaching a rule that stipulated that "anyone with a criminal record – unless it is spent – is not eligible to enter". The programme's executive producer at the time made clear that while anyone was eligible to enter, attempts to deceive staff would eventually be found out.

=== Schedule rigging allegation ===
When Judith Keppel's victory as the first UK jackpot winner on Who Wants to Be a Millionaire? was announced by ITV on the day that the corresponding episode was to be broadcast, several allegations were made that Celador had rigged the show to spoil the BBC's expected high ratings for the finale of One Foot in the Grave. Richard Wilson, the lead star on the sitcom, was quoted in particular for saying that the broadcaster had "planned" the win, adding "it seems a bit unfair to take the audience away from Victor's last moments on earth." David Renwick, writer of the sitcom, voiced annoyance that the episode would draw away interest from the sitcom's finale, believing that a leaked press release on ITV's announcement had been "naked opportunism", and it "would have been more honourable to let the show go out in the normal way", pointing out that it "killed off any element of tension or surprise in their own programme", but that "television is all about ratings". Richard Webber's account, in his 2006 book, cites "unnamed BBC sources" as those who "questioned the authenticity of Keppel's victory". The allegations, in turn, led to eleven viewers making complaints against the quiz show, of a similar nature, to the Independent Television Commission (ITC).

In response, ITV expressed distress at the allegations, claiming that it "undermined viewers' faith in the programme." Leslie Hill, the chairman of ITV, wrote to Sir Christopher Bland, the chairman of the Board of Governors of the BBC, to complain about the issue. The corporation apologised, saying that any suggestion of 'rigging' "did not represent the official view of the BBC", while the ITC's investigation cleared the programme of any wrongdoing.

=== The Syndicate ===
The Phone-a-Friend lifeline provided multiple instances of controversy during the show's run. In March 2007 various UK newspapers reported that an organised syndicate had been getting quiz enthusiasts onto the show in return for a percentage of their winnings. The person behind the syndicate was Keith Burgess from Northern Ireland. Burgess admitted to helping around 200 contestants to appear on the show since 1999; he estimates those contestants to have won around £5,000,000. The show producers are believed to have been aware of this operation, with Burgess stating: "The show knows about me and these types of syndicates, but they cover it up to keep the show going."

An earlier version of a Phone a Friend syndicate was reported in the Northampton Chronicle and Echo during 2003. Paul Smith, the managing director of Celador Productions, stated: "We are aware of Paddy Spooner and what people similar to him are doing, and we have made a priority of changing our question procedure. We are confident we have now made it impossible for anyone to manipulate the system." Since then, people that can be called have a picture of themselves shown on-air. During the 2010–14 era and with the show's relaunch in 2018, every person listed as a friend who might be called had a person from the production company present to record their actions.

In April 2020, the Daily Mirror provided more up-to-date details on how the syndicate run by Keith Burgess and Paddy Spooner had operated. Burgess admitted to getting five people onto the show within one hour.

== Filming locations ==
Since airing in September 1998, Who Wants to Be a Millionaire has been filmed at four locations throughout its run. It was originally filmed at the now-defunct Fountain Studios in London until the end of the second series aired in January 1999. Production moved to Elstree Studios in Hertfordshire for series 3, which aired in March 1999 and later moved to BBC Television Centre around 2011. Since 2018, production moved to Dock10 in Salford.

== Fastest Finger First ==
Fastest Finger First
- Genre: Quiz show
- Created by: Kieran Doherty; Matthew Worthy
- Presented by: Anita Rani
- Music by: Keith Strachan; Matthew Strachan
- Country of origin: United Kingdom
- Original language: English
- No. of series: 1
- No. of episodes: 5

Production
- Production location: dock10 studios
- Running time: 60 minutes
- Production companies: Stellify Media; Sony Pictures Television

Original release
- Network: ITV
- Release: 29 August – 2 September 2022

Fastest Finger First is a spin-off series commissioned by ITV and produced by Stellify Media, and filmed at dock10 studios in Salford. The winner of an episode is awarded the opportunity to play as a contestant for Who Wants to Be a Millionaire? Unlike the main show, Fastest Finger First is hosted by Anita Rani and was broadcast in an afternoon slot.

The first series premiered on 29 August 2022 with a five-episode run until 2 September 2022. The five winning contestants in this series became the first five contestants of Who Wants to Be a Millionaire? in its 38th series. In January 2023, it was reported that ITV had completely axed the series off.

=== Format ===
The format is based on the first Fastest Finger First round of the main series. In the beginning quickfire round, five contestants must answer a series of open ended questions to ascend a question ladder. If a contestant correctly answers twelve questions in a row, they automatically qualify to the second round. An incorrect answer resets their position to the bottom of the ladder. If the contestant does not know an answer, they can secure a safety net to remain at the same position of the ladder, and the same question is prompted to other contestants to buzz in. This cycle continues until a klaxon sounds, and the contestant in play proceeds to the second round.

When two contestants have secured a place in the second round, the winners play in a head-to-head duel where they must answer multiple-choice questions in a set sequence. If both contestants answer the sequence correctly, the contestant who scored with the fastest time wins. In this round, there are a maximum of seven sequences to answer. This round ends when it is impossible for a contestant to beat the other. The contestant who identified the fewest correct sequences returns to the pool to play another quickfire round.

These two rounds cycle three times in a row, after which a final head-to-head duel is played, where the winner of this round wins the game and secures their place as a contestant for Who Wants to Be a Millionaire?

== Millionaire Hot Seat ==
Millionaire Hot Seat
- Genre: Quiz show
- Presented by: Jeremy Clarkson
- Theme music composer: Paul Farrer
- Country of origin: United Kingdom
- Original language: English
- No. of series: 1
- No. of episodes: 20

Production
- Executive producer: Kerri Reid
- Production location: dock10 studios
- Running time: 23 minutes
- Production companies: Stellify Media; Sony Pictures (Note: As Sony Pictures in Series 1)

Original release
- Network: ITV
- Release: 6 January 2026 – present

On 16 July 2025, it was announced that a new spin-off series, Millionaire Hot Seat, would be commissioned by ITV and produced by Stellify Media, with Clarkson as host. Filming for the series took place from 19 to 23 November 2025, and premiered on 6 January 2026 in an early evening timeslot.

In June 2026, it was announced that ITV had ordered twenty new episodes of the spin-off alongside a further fifteen episodes of the flagship version.

=== Format ===
Millionaire Hot Seat "money tree"
Question number	Question value
15	£1,000,000
14	£250,000
13	£100,000
12	£50,000
11	£20,000
10	£10,000
9	£7,500
8	£5,000
7	£3,000
6	£2,000
5	£1,000
4	£500
3	£300
2	£200
1	£100
Milestone (Note: The £1,000 milestone is only applicable for the final contestant.) Top prize

The variation of the format was conceived in Norway and premiered in Italy as a series of "Extraordinary Edition" specials in December 2008 to celebrate the UK version's 10th anniversary, but gained popularity when an Australian version began in April 2009 and was a ratings success: this version gave the format its name.

The show sees six contestants playing one single game, rather than separate games for each contestant. The game starts with a top prize of £1 million, but as players provide incorrect answers, it moves one step down the money tree (for example, if the first player answers a question incorrectly, they are eliminated and the top prize moves down from £1 million to £250,000). Each question must be answered within a time limit which starts after the fourth answer has been read out - 15 seconds in the first five questions, 30 seconds in the next five, and 45 seconds in the last five.

In this version, as per the traditional Hot Seat format, the player in Seat 1 starts as the active player (the one in the "hot seat") and play rotates clockwise in seat order, with players aiming to be in the "hot seat" for the final question of the game. The game continues until all players have been eliminated, or the final question has been answered. If the active player answers the final question correctly, they win the value of that question. If the final question is answered incorrectly, or the final player is eliminated, the active player wins a consolation prize of £1,000, provided they have reached the safe level.

=== Transmission guide ===
Series	Start date	End date	Episodes
1	6 January 2026	16 January 2026	18
1	31 August 2026	11 September 2026	18
2	TBD in 2027	TBD in 2027	20

== International broadcasts ==
- The show was broadcast in Poland twice:
  - on TV6 (2011–2013), in original language (with no translation to Polish)
  - on BBC Brit (since 2019), editions with Clarkson, translated to Polish (including questions on screen)
- The show began airing on the Seven Network in Australia on 30 April 2025, titled Clarkson's Who Wants to Be a Millionaire?
- The show is broadcast in Ireland on Virgin Media One.
