= HD5 (Singaporean TV channel) =

- Country: Singapore
- Broadcast area: Singapore
- Network: Mediacorp TV

Programming
- Language: English
- Picture format: 1080i HDTV

Ownership
- Owner: Mediacorp

History
- Launched: 22 December 2006; 19 years ago
- Replaced: Mediacorp HDTV
- Closed: 1 October 2017; 8 years ago
- Former names: Mediacorp HDTV (2006)

Links
- Website: www.mewatch.sg

Availability

Terrestrial
- Digital terrestrial television: Channel 1 HD

HD5 was a Singaporean free-to-air television channel that was launched as the high-definition version of Channel 5. The channel was the first HD broadcast on DTT in Southeast Asia. HD5 aired 10 hours of HD-produced series each week, including movies, dramas, and original productions made by Mediacorp.

In late 2013, Channel 5 HD was launched on DTT and aired simulcast programming with Channel 5's SD feed. Due to national availability of Channel 5 HD, HD5 was shut down on 1 October 2017.

== History ==
Mediacorp trialled its HDTV service on digital UHF channel 38 under the brand name MediaCorp HDTV in July 2006. The service broadcast from 9pm to 11pm to an audience of 1,000 households with at least one LCD television set capable of receiving HD signals. With a schedule of 14 hours per week, MediaCorp HDTV in this phase carried American TV series already filmed in high definition and a handful of feature films.

A year later, in July 2007, these broadcasts became regular, adopting the brand name HD5. The new channel was a simulcast of Channel 5 with the entirety of its programmes aired in digital format. The Media Development Authority has demanded production companies to begin producing content in high definition in order to boost the new channel. Most of its programming at prime time were aired in "True HD". As of October 2007, HD5 broadcasts from 6 am to 12 am daily.

HD5 became available on StarHub in July 2008, airing on Channel 300. Up until that period, the channel's carriage was limited to Mio TV and DTT as Mediacorp and StarHub were on a dispute due to fee payment. This coincided with the coverage of the then-upcoming 2008 Summer Olympics, for which Mediacorp would carry extensive coverage on the channel.

== See also ==
- List of programmes broadcast by Mediacorp 5
- High-definition television in Singapore
