= Just for Laughs (British TV series) =

British silent comedy/hidden camera television show

- Genre: Comedy
- Developed by: Wild Rover Productions
- Directed by: Pascal Carrette; Jett Loe
- Starring: Keith Law; Kirsteen O'Sullivan; Sonia Butterworth
- Opening theme: Just for Laughs Theme
- Ending theme: Just for Laughs Theme
- Country of origin: United Kingdom
- Original languages: Silent; English
- No. of series: 5
- No. of episodes: 50+

Production
- Executive producers: Mike Edgar; Pierre Girard
- Producer: Philip Morrow
- Production locations: Belfast, Leeds
- Camera setup: Multi-camera
- Running time: 22 minutes

Original release
- Network: BBC One
- Release: 31 May 2003 – 21 July 2007

Related
- Just for Laughs Gags

Just for Laughs is a British silent comedy/hidden camera television show, and the UK adaptation of the Canadian series of the same name, that began in Montreal in late 2000. It was broadcast on Saturday nights on BBC One. It was produced by Wild Rover Productions with Philip Morrow as producer. It started airing in 2003 and ran for five series, going off air in 2007. During its run, it was the only Saturday night entertainment show currently on BBC One to be produced by an independent television company based outside London.

Just for Laughs was filmed all over the United Kingdom, primarily in and around Belfast, Glasgow and Leeds. The Belfast Botanic Gardens were a common filming location for doing some pranks.

Just for Laughs has a Canadian sister version called Just for Laughs Gags, and the format of the two is identical. Some clips for Just for Laughs are taken directly from Just for Laughs Gags, and vice versa.

== Repeat broadcasts ==
Since Just For Laughs ended on BBC One in 2007, the show was rarely repeated although Paramount Comedy 2 repeated the series at weekends for a short period in 2006, But it was not until 2009 when Channel 5's Sister Channel 5* (then called Fiver) bought the rights to repeat the episodes on weekday afternoons. Since the summer of 2010 the show has not been repeated on 5* and seemed highly unlikely to ever be repeated. However, from Monday 23 July 2012 the program was repeated on Comedy Central Extra for first time since 2006. The JustforlaughsTV YouTube channel has over 1 billion video views.

== DVD releases ==
There have been several DVD releases of Just For Laughs which are below, each of these releases have been postponed

- Just For Laughs Volume 1
- Just For Laughs – The Best of Series One
