= Wild Rover Productions =

Northern Irish television production company

- Type: Private
- Founded: 1999
- Founder: Philip Morrow
- Headquarters: Belfast, Northern Ireland
- Key people: Matthew Worthy, Kieran Doherty
- Website: http://www.wild-rover.com/

Wild Rover Productions is a television production company located in Belfast, Northern Ireland. It was started by Philip Morrow in 1999 and has since become one of the UK's most successful regionally based entertainment companies.

Wild Rover mainly produces entertainment, comedy, and pop-factual TV programmes. It currently produces Just for Laughs, a weekly hidden-camera comedy show for BBC One. This UK version is created by Wild Rover as a UK sister version of the Canadian show Just for Laughs: Gags, produced by CBC.

Other productions from Wild Rover include Would You Pass The 11+, hosted by Eamonn Holmes, which was the BBC's first "red-button" interactive regional programme. It sought to help prepare children and inform parents of the skills needed to pass the Northern Ireland Transfer Procedure test. Wild Rover also produced All Mixed Up, the UK's most successful regional ITV game show, and McKeever, a sketch-comedy show starring Northern Irish comedian Nuala McKeever.

In 2006, Wild Rover produced the BBC One interactive show Get Smarter in a Week, which offers tips and strategies for improving intelligence.

In 2009, Wild Rover began producing Secret Fortune, a Saturday night primetime gameshow created by Wild Rover's Matthew Worthy and Kieran Doherty for the BBC Lottery show, which premiered in February 2011. In the spring of 2011, the CBS network commissioned a pilot hosted by Donny Osmond that failed to be picked up for a full series.

On 12 October 2010 it was announced that Wild Rover's television show format Take The Money And Run received a six-episode order for show production by ABC with Jerry Bruckheimer as executive producer along with Amazing Race creators Bertram van Munster and Elise Doganieri. ABC did not renew the show beyond the first series.
