= Just for Laughs Gags Asia =

Singaporean silent comedy hidden-camera television series

- 好笑王
- Genre: Comedy
- Country of origin: Singapore
- Original language: Silent
- No. of seasons: 1
- No. of episodes: 13

Production
- Production location: Singapore
- Running time: 30 minutes (with commercials)
- Production companies: Just for Laughs; Mediacorp Studios

Original release
- Network: Mediacorp 5
- Release: January 12 – April 13, 2010

Related
- Just for Laughs Gags

Just for Laughs Gags Asia (Chinese: 好笑王) is a Singaporean silent comedy hidden-camera television series adapted from the Canadian series Just for Laughs Gags. It premiered on Mediacorp 5 on 12 January 2010.

The series was filmed in Singapore and features pranks performed on unsuspecting members of the public, whose reactions are captured by hidden cameras. The program contains no spoken dialogue, allowing it to be broadcast to audiences who speak different languages without dubbing.

== Cast ==
The performers featured in the series include:

- Beatrice Chien Ah Chee
- Bee Fong Heng
- Bruce Stevens Matthieu
- Dawn Tam Siew Hong
- Derek Seong
- Elizabeth Widjaja
- Eugene Lincwwd
- Eric Low
- Eunice Ho Xianglin
- Gillian Tay Li Lynn
- Jay Yau Xing Zhe
- Lily Ong Siew Lin
- Peer Metze
- Vasu Dev Veerappa
- Đào Đức Vượng

== Broadcast ==
The series premiered on Mediacorp 5 on 12 January 2010. Archived programme information also lists subsequent broadcasts on Mediacorp 8, Disney Channel Asia and G4 in Canada.
