= Disney Channel (Ukraine) =

Defunct Ukrainian feed of Disney Channel

- Country: United Kingdom
- Broadcast area: Ukraine
- Headquarters: Hammersmith, London

Programming
- Languages: Ukrainian (dubbing); Bulgarian (dubbing) (2010-2012); English; Russian (dubbing)
- Picture format: (576i, SDTV)

Ownership
- Owner: The Walt Disney Company Limited; Disney Channels Worldwide
- Sister channels: Disney Channel Bulgaria

History
- Launched: 15 October 2010; 16 years ago (as a TV channel); 24 December 2012; 13 years ago (as a programming block on PLUSPLUS)
- Closed: 2 January 2013; 13 years ago (as a TV channel); 3 April 2023; 3 years ago (as a programming block on PLUSPLUS)
- Replaced by: A programming block on PLUSPLUS (as a TV channel)

Disney Channel was a U.K. based pay television channel broadcast in Ukraine. It was launched on 15 October 2010. As it shared its video feed with Romania and Moldova and Bulgaria, the channel released a Ukrainian and Russian track that broadcast dubs for animated series and a live action program. On 2 January 2013, Disney Channel removed Ukrainian and Russian track and ceased to be distributed in Ukraine, with Disney Channel content being moved to a branded slot on PLUSPLUS and NLO TV.

== History ==
Before the launch of the channel, some Disney programs were shown on the 1+1 channel, as well as Novyi Kanal. This included voice-over on Novyi Kanal and full dubbing on 1+1. The Russian feed of Disney Channel was broadcast in Ukraine, which itself replaced the last Jetix feed in the world on 10 August 2010. The local Ukrainian feed of Disney Channel was launched on 15 October 2010.

From 1 January 2019, to 11 July 2022, the block "Disney Club" was broadcast daily on NLO TV and broadcast mostly classic animated series.

== Shows ==
Programmes

- A.N.T. Farm
- Fish Hooks
- Good Luck Charlie
- Gravity Falls
- Hannah Montana
- Jessie
- Jonas
- Kick Buttowski: Suburban Daredevil
- Kid vs. Kat
- Pair of Kings
- Phineas and Ferb
- Pokémon
- Shake It Up
- Soy Luna
- Sonny with a Chance
- Splatalot!
- Stoked
- The Suite Life of Zack & Cody
- The Suite Life on Deck
- Ultimate Spider-Man
- Wizards of Waverly Place
- Violetta
- Zeke and Luther

Disney Junior programs:

- Handy Manny
- The Hive
- Jungle Junction
- My Friends Tigger & Pooh
- Mickey Mouse Clubhouse
- Special Agent Oso
- Jake and the Never Land Pirates

== Logos ==
2010–2011

2011–2013 (TV channel), 2013–2014 (block on PLUSPLUS)
