= Just for Laughs Gags =

Canadian silent comedy and reality television series

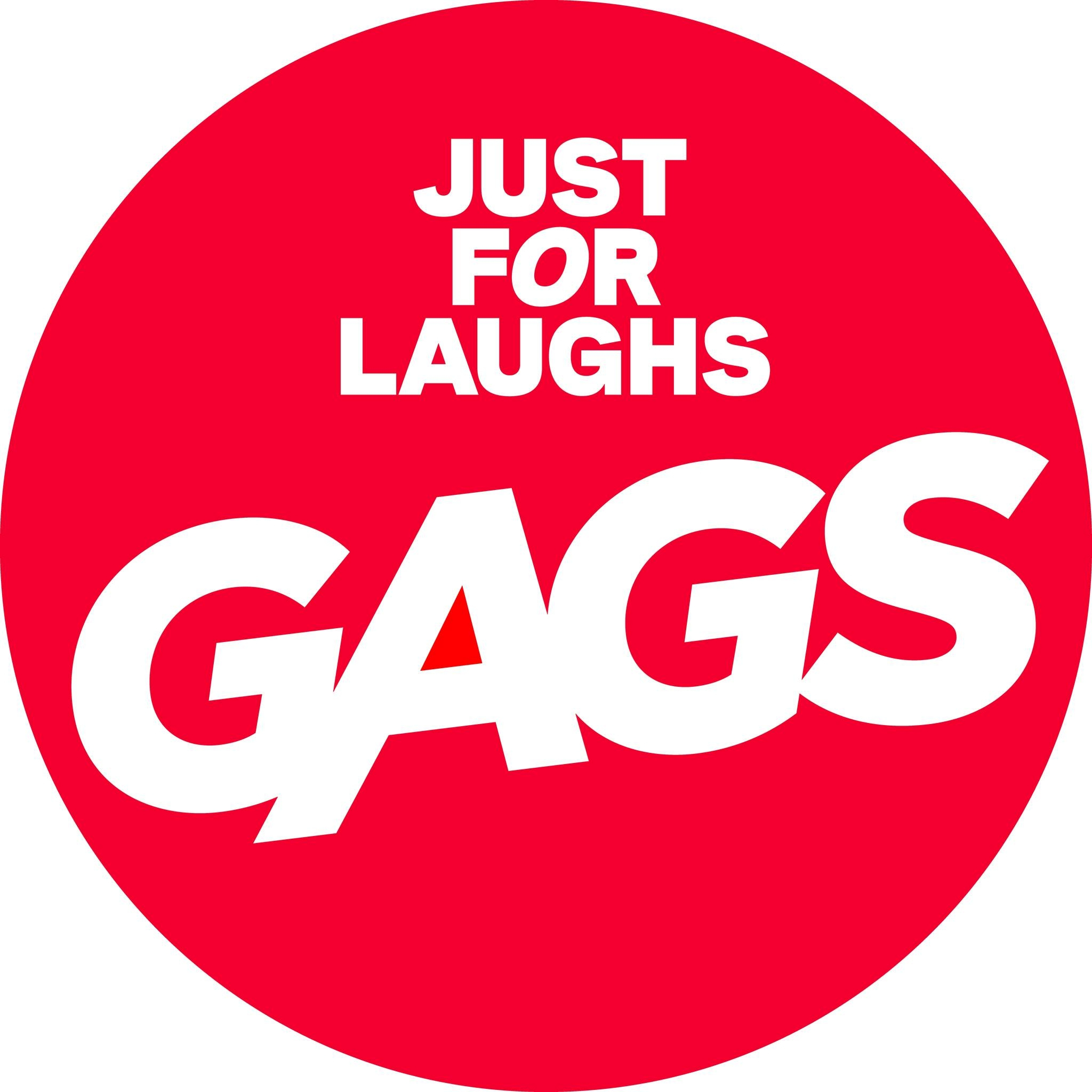
- Also known as: Just for Laughs
- Genre: Comedy
- Created by: Pierre Girard; Jacques Chevalier
- Country of origin: Canada
- Original languages: French; English
- No. of seasons: 26
- No. of episodes: 338

Production
- Production locations: Canada (cities of Quebec City, Montreal and Vancouver); Mexico
- Running time: 22 minutes
- Production companies: Just for Laughs; Groupe Fair-Play; (Note: First 4 seasons only.)

Original release
- Network: CTV Comedy Channel; CBC Television; TVA; TVO
- Release: 26 December 2000 – present

Related
- Just for Laughs (British TV series); Just for Laughs Gags Asia; Just Kidding

Just for Laughs Gags (French: Les Gags) is a Canadian silent comedy and reality television series created by Pierre Girard and Jacques Chevalier. It is part of the Just for Laughs brand.

Like Candid Camera, the series features pranks on unsuspecting people whose reactions are captured by hidden cameras, with the pranks revealed at the end of each gag. While some segments have included brief dialogue, most rely on music, sound effects and laugh tracks, with little to no spoken dialogue.

== Production ==
Example of a gag in the show

On 21 December 2000, Just for Laughs Gags began airing on French Canadian network Canal D. In the following years, the show was picked up by TVA, CBC Television and CTV Comedy Channel in Canada, BBC One in the UK, TF1 in France, and ABC and Telemundo and also Laff in the United States; the Canadian version (unlike the ones produced for ABC) aired in the United States in first-run syndication starting in the fall of 2015. That version is distributed by PPI Partners and is available in both weekday strip and weekend runs.

The production team follows safety and good-taste guidelines and obtains permission from participants before their footage is used. Gags can range from simple pranks to larger productions that require several days of preparation. A typical 75-second gag costs about $25,000 to produce, while larger pranks can cost up to $60,000.

Most segments are filmed in Montreal, while some have been filmed in Quebec City, Vancouver and Mexico. In 2011, the show spawned a spin-off, Just Kidding, which consists exclusively of kids playing pranks on adults. The same distributor also distributed Surprise Sur Prise, a similar show.

== Cast ==
The cast is as follows:

- Antoine Laurier
- Claude Talbot
- Dany Many
- Denis Levasseur
- Denise Jacques
- Francis Gio Santiago
- Jack Martin
- Jacques Drolet
- Jean Guimond
- Jean Kohnen
- Jean-Pierre Alarie
- Jean Provencher
- Keith Law
- Kirsteen O'Sullivan
- Marie-Andrée Poulin
- Marie-Ève Larivière
- Marie-Ève Verdier
- Marie-Pierre Bouchard
- Mathilde Laurier
- Maude Croteau
- Maude Laurier
- Nadja David
- Pascal Babin
- Philippe Bond
- Rebecca Laurier
- Richard Ledoux
- Richardson Zéphir
- Sonia Butterworth
- Ted Pluviose

== Reception ==
With its silent format and no translation required (outside of gag set-up commentary which is easily localised), Just for Laughs Gags reached 70 countries in 3 years after its debut in 2000, and by 2015 had been purchased for use in over 130 countries throughout the world in various platforms, including airlines.

Reactions to the gags range from "inane" to cross-culturally funny. Bruce Hills, a former Just for Laughs executive, cites the show's ability to express to audiences without dialogue as the reason for its high demand from broadcasters.

== International versions ==
=== United Kingdom ===
A British adaptation, Just for Laughs, was produced by Wild Rover Productions for BBC One. Production began in 2003 in Northern Ireland, with the series premiering on 31 May 2003. It ran for five series until 2007.

=== United States ===
Just for Laughs
- Genre: Comedy
- Created by: Rick Miller
- Directed by: Troy Miller
- Presented by: Rick Miller
- Country of origin: United States
- Original language: English
- No. of seasons: 3
- No. of episodes: 35

Production
- Executive producer: Troy Miller
- Production location: Warner Bros. Studios Burbank
- Camera setup: Single-camera
- Running time: 23 minutes

Original release
- Network: ABC
- Release: 17 July 2007 – 12 July 2009

An American adaptation, titled Just for Laughs, was hosted by Rick Miller and produced by Dakota Pictures for ABC. It premiered in 2007 and ran for three seasons until 2009.

=== Singapore ===
In 2009, Mediacorp entered into an exclusive agreement with Just for Laughs to co-produce and distribute an Asian adaptation, Just for Laughs Gags Asia. The episodes were filmed in Singapore and premiered on Mediacorp 5 on 12 January 2010.

== Online presence ==
The show has an official YouTube channel. As of September 2025, the channel had at least 8 thousand videos.

== Lawsuit ==
In 2014, an 83-year-old woman threatened to sue Just for Laughs after witnessing a prank in which a man appeared to repeatedly bounce a baby in a carrier on a trampoline before the baby was thrown from it. She said the prank left her traumatized. A 2019 retrospective on the series revisited the prank and quoted its creator discussing the incident.
