= Win Your Wish List =

- 2018 titlecard.
- Genre: Game show
- Presented by: Shane Richie; Gino D'Acampo
- Country of origin: United Kingdom
- Original language: English
- No. of series: 5
- No. of episodes: 37

Production
- Production locations: BBC Pacific Quay (2014–2016); Dock10 (2018–2021)
- Running time: 50 minutes (2014–2016); 45 minutes (2018–2021)
- Production companies: Victory Television Scotland (2014–2016); BBC Scotland (2014–2016); Stellify Media (2018–2021)

Original release
- Network: BBC One
- Release: 27 December 2014 – 7 May 2016
- Network: Channel 5
- Release: 28 July 2018 – 23 June 2021

Related
- The National Lottery Draws

Win Your Wish List is a British game show that first aired on BBC One as a National Lottery show from 27 December 2014 to 7 May 2016 with Shane Richie as host, as The National Lottery: Win Your Wish List. In 2018, the programme was revived by Channel 5 with Gino D'Acampo as host, billed as Gino's Win Your Wish List.

== Format ==
In each episode, a family of five compete in six timed rounds to try to win prizes from a list of six gifts they have previously chosen (their "Wish List"). In most rounds, the team is tasked with answering trivia questions from a given category, with one member assigned to read the questions, and one assigned to answer them.

A meter is displayed on a screen in the studio floor, which is divided into green and red zones, and begins at the centre: the meter continuously drains towards the red zone throughout the round, but correct answers move the meter steps toward the green zone. If the meter reaches the outer edge of the green zone before time runs out, the round's prize is won instantly. Otherwise, if the meter is within the green zone when time runs out, the prize becomes available to win during the final round.

If the meter runs out in the red zone, or is otherwise within the red zone when time expires, the prize is lost and cannot be won in the final. Once during the game, a family member not playing in a challenge may reset the meter back to the centre.

The original BBC version of the series used only trivia rounds, and was played by couples. The Channel 5 revival uses family teams instead, and some rounds may involve physical challenges (such as throwing balls into buckets strapped to Gino's waist, with each catch scored on the meter in a similar manner to correct answers).

After the six rounds, the team plays a final, timed trivia round to try and win the remaining prizes that were not won instantly.

== Series overview ==
Series	Start date	End date	Episodes	Presenter
1	27 December 2014	14 March 2015	10	Shane Richie
2	6 February 2016	7 May 2016	8	Shane Richie
3	28 July 2018	29 December 2018	7	Gino D'Acampo
4	23 June 2019	14 July 2019	4	Gino D'Acampo
5	14 June 2021	23 June 2021	8	Gino D'Acampo

== Transmissions ==
=== Series 1 ===
Episode no.	Airdate	Viewers (millions)	BBC One weekly ranking
1	27 December 2014	5.13	24
2	3 January 2015	5.28	25
3	10 January 2015	5.00	28
4	17 January 2015	4.95	25
5	24 January 2015	4.90	25
6	31 January 2015	4.83	24
7	7 February 2015	5.27	18
8	14 February 2015	4.94	19
9	21 February 2015	4.79	25
10	14 March 2015	5.29	24

=== Series 2 ===
Episode no.	Airdate	Viewers (millions)	BBC One weekly ranking
1	6 February 2016	4.26	29
2	13 February 2016	4.19	26
3	20 February 2016	4.29	29
4	12 March 2016	3.91	28
5	16 April 2016	4.42	26
6	23 April 2016	4.51	25
7	30 April 2016	4.37	26
8	7 May 2016	4.33	26

=== Series 3 ===
Episode no.	Airdate	Viewers (millions)	Channel 5 weekly ranking
1	28 July 2018	0.94	8
2	4 August 2018	0.76	25
3	11 August 2018	0.84	18
4	18 August 2018	0.70	22
5	25 August 2018	0.59	30
6	22 December 2018	—N/a	—N/a
7	29 December 2018	—N/a	—N/a

=== Series 4 ===
Episode no.	Airdate	Viewers (millions)	Channel 5 weekly ranking
1	23 June 2019	—N/a	—N/a
2	30 June 2019	—N/a	—N/a
3	7 July 2019	—N/a	—N/a
4	14 July 2019	—N/a	—N/a

=== Series 5 ===
Episode no.	Airdate	Viewers (millions)	Channel 5 weekly ranking
1	14 June 2021	—N/a	—N/a
2	15 June 2021	—N/a	—N/a
3	16 June 2021	—N/a	—N/a
4	17 June 2021	—N/a	—N/a
5	18 June 2021	—N/a	—N/a
6	21 June 2021	—N/a	—N/a
7	22 June 2021	—N/a	—N/a
8	23 June 2021	—N/a	—N/a

== International versions ==
Country	Name	First episode	Last episode	Host	Channel
France	Wish List : La Liste de vos envies	6 July 2015	15 January 2016	Christophe Dechavanne	TF1
Portugal	Prêmio de Sonho	5 August 2019	11 October 2019	Cristina Ferreira	SIC
