= Philip Morrow =

Northern Irish television producer (born 1962)

- Born: May 23, 1962 (age 64); Belfast, Northern Ireland
- Occupation: television producer

Philip Morrow (born May 23, 1962) is a Northern Irish television producer. In 1999, he founded Wild Rover Productions, a television production company best known for producing the hidden-camera show Just for Laughs along with various entertainment, comedy, and pop-factual TV programmes. Morrow currently serves as the company's managing director.

Morrow has held many positions within the United Kingdom television industry over the past twenty years. His first commission was from Channel 4 in 1990, to produce a one-off TV programme Viz - The Documentary. It told the story of Viz in a way that spoofed serious investigative TV shows such as Panorama or Dispatches.

He was head of comedy at Thames Television in the 1980s and 1990s. There, he wrote and produced Fluke – presented by Tim Vine on Channel 4 – a gameshow spoofing gameshows in which the contestants' success or failure was based on completely arbitrary and random rules. At Thames Television, he also produced the show Sugar and Spice for Five.

Morrow then served at the head of programmes for UTV (formerly Ulster Television). Projects he worked on included Emerald Shoes, a documentary on Irish dance for ITV, and Same Difference for Channel 4. He then served as executive producer of development at Mentorm Films, where shows included Space Precinct, Today's the Day, Passport to the Sun, and Happy Families. Morrow next served as commissioning editor for entertainment at Channel 4, where his shows included Vic Reeves Big Night Out, Drop the Dead Donkey, Whose Line is it Anyway, and Tonight with Jonathan Ross.

In 2006, Morrow was elected to be the Northern Ireland PACT representative and on the board of Northern Ireland Screen. In this capacity, he has encouraged BBC's investment in "out of London" companies to offset the disadvantages associated with physical distance from United Kingdom commissioning centres.

In 2009, Morrow began producing Secret Fortune, a Saturday night primetime gameshow for the BBC Lottery show. He also developed the format and structure of the show.

On October 12, 2010, it was announced that Morrow's television show format Take the Money and Run received a six-episode order for show production by ABC with Jerry Bruckheimer as executive producer along with Amazing Race creators Bertram van Munster and Elise Doganieri.
