= Victoria Groce =

American quiz player and game show contestant

- Born: Victoria Rubin; January 20, 1981 (age 45); Macon, Georgia, U.S.
- Known for: The Chase; Jeopardy! Masters; World Quizzing Championships
- Spouse: Phillip Groce
- Children: 1
- Relatives: Phil Rubin (brother)

Victoria Groce (née Rubin; born January 20, 1981) is an American quiz player and game show contestant.

Initially known for ending the 19-day winning streak of Jeopardy! champion David Madden in September 2005, Groce's increasing success in competitive trivia led to becoming a Chaser on the American version of The Chase in 2022. Returning to Jeopardy! after nearly 20 years, Groce won the first Jeopardy! Invitational Tournament (JIT) in April 2024 and then won the Jeopardy! Masters a month later.

In June 2024, Groce became the first woman and the first American to win the World Quizzing Championship, and in 2026 she became the fifth person to win a second time.

Groce's first book Know It All: The Quiz Champion's Essential Guidebook to Learning Anything will be published in February 2027.

== Early life ==
Groce is a native of Macon, Georgia. She grew up with two brothers (including Phil Rubin) and a sister, describing a "heavy emphasis on being competitive, and where we were expected to be excellent academically."

In school, by Groce's account, she skipped two grades and partook in many academic competitions. Groce began competing in the Academic Bowl during high school.

At the University of Georgia, Groce studied comparative literature and continued competing in College Bowl, but she was not a standout player.

Groce studied piano for many years, intending to be a concert pianist. This experience helped reduce potential anxiety about appearing on television. She has observed that "the idea of being in performance, sitting in front of people, is a very natural one for me." In addition, accompanying choral music taught Groce "the necessity of just going on," a skill that has helped her recover quickly after mistakes.

Once her daughter started school, Groce intended to return to graduate study, aiming for a PhD in virology or immunology. However, the effects of chronic migraine pain became so debilitating that it prevented Groce from pursuing a career in lab science.

== Career ==
=== Competitive trivia ===
Groce's competitive quizzing career as an adult has included individual and team competition, both in person and virtually, at events in the United States, the United Kingdom, Spain, Germany, Ukraine, and India.

==== International Quizzing Championships ====
At the 2022 Ultimate Quizzing Championships (now the International Quizzing Championships), held in Berlin, Groce was part of the winning team, "The New Janitors," in the club competition and won the pairs competition with Kevin Ashman of England. At the 2023 International Quizzing Championships, held in Spain, she won the national team competition with the United States team and the pairs competition with Thomas Kolåsæter of Norway.

==== World Quizzing Championships ====
On June 1, 2024, Groce won the World Quizzing Championships for the first time, scoring 170 points to runners-up Daoud Jackson of England (166) and Ronny Swiggers of Belgium (159). This marked the first WQC win by a woman, as well as the first win by an American. In 2025, Groce scored a new personal best of 182 points but came in second place to Jackson, and in 2026, she won for the second time with a score of 191 points, breaking the high-score record previously set by Jackson.

Prior to her first World Quizzing Championship victory, Groce had placed second in 2023, just one point behind Swiggers. Previous results included seventh place in 2022, 10th in 2021, third in 2020, 19th in 2019, 61st in 2018, and 38th in 2017.

==== Other team trivia ====
As an adult, Groce found early success in competitive team trivia at Geek Bowl, then the largest pub quiz competition in North America. Along with Jeopardy! heavyweights including Colby Burnett, Troy Meyer, and Ryan Chaffee, Groce was part of a "super team" called The Initiative. In its four years of competition, The Initiative won first place in Seattle (2017, as The Shawn Kemp Fatherhood Initiative) and Chicago (2020, as the Laurence Tureaud Compassion Initiative), as well as third in Boston (2018, as the Kyrie Irving Geodetics Initiative) and second in Las Vegas (2019, as the Rod Smart Grammar Initiative) .

=== The Chase ===
Groce's success in competitive quizzing and connections to the trivia community led to her being invited to serve as a "chaser" on the third season of the U.S version of the game show The Chase in 2022 alongside Jeopardy! champions James Holzhauer (who was a contestant on the GSN version), Brandon Blackwell, Buzzy Cohen, and Brad Rutter.

Prior to her debut in season three, Groce was promoted as "the smartest woman in the world based on her domination of online trivia tournaments." On the show, her nickname is "The Queen."

=== Jeopardy! ===
==== Initial appearance ====
Groce first appeared on Jeopardy! on September 19, 2005 (Season 22), identifying herself as "a musician originally from Decatur, Georgia."

Groce said that she remembers very little of her brief experience, as she was preoccupied by the stress of a recent move to Pittsburgh and raising a new baby.

In her first game, Groce beat 19-day champion David Madden. The next day, she finished in third place, behind retired advertising executive Ray Freson and writer Stacey Swann. In total, Groce won $23,801.

==== 2024: JIT and return ====
In March 2024, Groce was invited to compete among a field of 27 contestants from throughout the show's history in the inaugural Jeopardy! Invitational Tournament.

Groce and fellow Chaser Brandon Blackwell, also in the JIT field, had helped their trivia teammate Troy Meyer prepare for the 2024 Tournament of Champions, where he reached the finals.

"I compete in a huge number of quiz competitions around the world, and the piece of 'Jeopardy!' that is 'know the things and remember them fast' I knew I was in good shape for," Groce recalled. "But so much of the rest of it — the buzzer, gameplay strategy, lateral thinking, and wordplay skills — I knew would be tricky to train for over just a few weeks."

In the JIT, Groce now listed her occupation as "writer and television personality from Pittsburgh, Pennsylvania." Groce defeated Dhruv Gaur and Ben Ingram in her quarterfinal game, followed by Matt Jackson and Sam Buttrey in the semifinals. (David Madden, whom she defeated in Season 22, also took part in the JIT, but lost to Amy Schneider in the semifinals.)

The finals pitted Groce against Amy Schneider and Andrew He, with the first player to two wins declared the winner. Schneider took the first game, but Groce took the second and third games to win the JIT. She won $100,000 and a bid to the Masters.

Between the JIT and the Masters Tournament, Groce's daily routine included "... an hour-and-a-half doing crosswords and word puzzles like anagrams" in an effort to improve her skill at language and wordplay.

==== 2024 Jeopardy! Masters ====
In the second Jeopardy! Masters Tournament, Groce faced a six-person field including 2023 Masters finalists James Holzhauer, Matt Amodio, and Mattea Roach, as well as 2024 ToC winner Yogesh Raut. Groce also faced Amy Schneider for the second time that year, as the producers selected Schneider as their pick following the JIT.

During the Masters Tournament, Groce quickly established herself as a dominant force. By Game 4, Groce was tied with Yogesh Raut with at 10 points, while James Holzhauer followed behind at six match points. After Game 5, Groce led her next closest competitor, Raut, 13 to his 10. Groce led the competition throughout the semifinal rounds but was second to Raut at the start of the two semifinal games, followed by Holzhauer (the 2023 Masters winner) and Amy Schneider. Schneider was eliminated after the two semifinal games.

The Jeopardy! Masters final matches aired on May 22, 2024, and consisted of a two-game total point competition between the three remaining players. After the first game in the final's matches, Holzhauer led in points, with 28,309, while Groce was in second with 21,400 and Raut in third at 19,200 after a correct final jeopardy response. In Game 2, Raut's early Daily Double wager almost doubled his points. In Double Jeopardy!, Groce found both daily doubles, wagering it all on the first one and making a more conservative 800-point bet on the second. Contestant scores at the end of both rounds were Groce 34,000; Raut 15,799, and Holzhauer 8,800.

All three players correctly answered the Final Jeopardy clue in the category "American Women": "The New York Times wrote of this woman who had died in 1951, 'Though she was forgotten at the time, part of her remained alive.'" With her high second game total, Groce did not need to wager anything to earn the title with final scores of Groce, 55,400; Raut, 45,910; and Holzhauer 38,017.

As the tournament winner, Groce received a $500,000 cash prize as well as the Trebek trophy. Raut took second place, earning $250,000 while Holzhauer took away $150,000 for third place. All three players are now eligible to compete in next year's Masters tournament.

== Personal life ==
Groce has lived in Pittsburgh since just after her initial appearance on Jeopardy! in 2005. Her husband, Philip, is a software engineer at the Carnegie Mellon Software Engineering Institute where Groce has also held journal coordinator and research positions. She has celiac disease.

Groce has a daughter named Nora, who was an infant during her initial appearance on Jeopardy! in 2005. By the time Groce appeared on the Jeopardy! Invitational Tournament and J! Masters in 2024, Nora was a student at a Pittsburgh-area university. Groce's Final Jeopardy! responses often included a "Hi Nora!"
