= Game Show Network =

American pay television channel

- Logo used since October 1, 2018
- Country: United States
- Broadcast area: United States; Canada
- Headquarters: Santa Monica, California, U.S.

Programming
- Language: English
- Picture format: 1080i (HDTV) (HD feed downgraded to letterboxing 480i for the SDTV feed)

Ownership
- Owner: Sony Pictures Television
- Parent: Game Show Network, LLC
- Key people: Suzanne Prete (president, Game Shows, SPT)
- Sister channels: Great Entertainment Television; Sony Cine; Sony Movie Channel

History
- Launched: December 1, 1994; 31 years ago
- Former names: GSN (2004–18)

Links
- Website: www.gameshownetwork.com

Availability

Streaming media
- Service(s): Frndly TV, FuboTV, Hulu + Live TV, Philo, Sling TV, YouTube TV

Game Show Network (GSN) is an American basic cable channel owned by the television network division of Sony Pictures Television. The channel's programming is primarily dedicated to game shows, including reruns of acquired game shows, along with new, first-run original and revived game shows. The network has also previously aired reality competition series and televised poker.

As of October 2019, Game Show Network claimed that it was available to "nearly 75 million" American households, primarily through traditional cable and satellite services. The network and its original programming are also available on streaming and Internet television services, including Frndly TV, YouTube TV, Philo, fuboTV, Sling TV, and Plex.

A spin-off network, Game Show Central, was launched by Sony Pictures Television Networks on March 28, 2020, as a digital ad-supported streaming channel offering Game Show Network original series and a limited selection of acquired game shows also featured on the cable channel. In February 2025, Sony began distributing Game Show Central as an over-the-air multicast network (primarily on stations owned by the E. W. Scripps Company and Inyo Broadcast Holdings), featuring a separate schedule consisting exclusively of reruns of Game Show Network's original series, incorporating programs not carried on either the streaming or cable channels.

== History ==
=== 1994–2004: as "Game Show Network" ===
On May 7, 1992, Sony Pictures Entertainment joined forces with the United Video Satellite Group to launch the Game Show Channel, which was set for a 1993 launch. The announcement of the channel was made by SPE president Mel Harris.

On December 2, 1992, Sony Pictures Entertainment made a deal to acquire the Barry & Enright game show library, and in a separate deal, struck a 10-year licensing agreement for the rights to the Mark Goodson game show library of more than 20,000 episodes including among others, What's My Line?, Family Feud, and To Tell the Truth. Upon the deal, Sony said it would sell an equity stake in the network to Mark Goodson Productions, including the production of new original series by Jonathan Goodson Productions. Both deals were completed on December 7, 1992, eleven days before Mark Goodson's death. On June 6, 1994, Mark Goodson Productions withdrew from the venture. GSN's launch time was intended to be at 10:00 p.m. ET, but at the time, it was instead set for three hours earlier to 7:00 p.m. ET.

Game Show Network launched at 7:00 p.m. on December 1, 1994. The first aired game show to air on GSN was What's My Line?. By the launch date, the network had acquired rights to over 40,000 episodes from the libraries of several game show production companies and corporate parent Sony. The initial lineup was exclusively acquired programming such as Match Game, Family Feud, The Newlywed Game, Jeopardy!, and Wheel of Fortune. Over time, Game Show Network acquired the rights to The Price Is Right, The $10,000 Pyramid, Let's Make a Deal, Hollywood Squares, Who Wants to Be a Millionaire? and other libraries, putting them on the schedule at various times throughout the network's history. The network eventually began producing original game shows such as Lingo, Burt Luddin's Love Buffet (Hosted by John Cervenka), Whammy!, Inquizition, and Extreme Gong. One program to air on GSN was Faux Pause, which aired in 1998, and was co-hosted by Mary Gallagher and Sean Donnellan. Pause consisted of jokes and skits done while watching certain episodes of game shows, in a similar fashion to Mystery Science Theater 3000.

In 2001, a massive change in both leadership and programming at the network took place when Liberty Media acquired a 50% stake. Both President Michael Fleming and Vice President Jake Tauber departed, and former ABC Family/Fox Family Channel president Rich Cronin was hired to lead the network.

=== 2004–18: as "GSN" ===
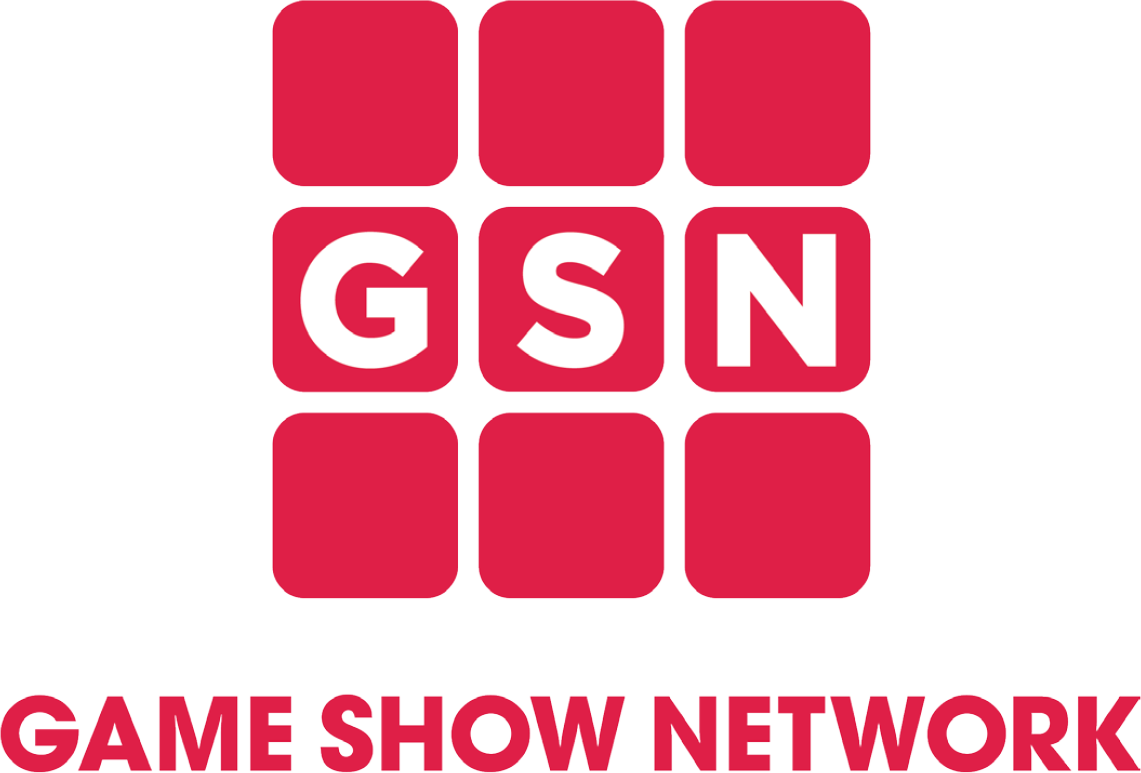
GSN logo used from November 6, 2008 to June 2, 2015

GSN logo used from June 3, 2015 to September 30, 2018

On March 15, 2004, Game Show Network began using the acronym "GSN" and introduced the tagline "The Network for Games." GSN began expanding its programming to include reality television games and various competition-based programs. GSN would also air reruns of reality competitions (for example, Spy TV and The Mole). Along with its new format, GSN would continue to produce traditional game shows, including new seasons of Lingo and a revival of Chain Reaction.

David Goldhill succeeded Rich Cronin as GSN president on August 1, 2007. A high definition simulcast feed of the network was launched on September 15, 2010.

Some notable acquisitions for the network included Who Wants to Be a Millionaire? and the Steve Harvey-hosted Family Feud, both of which would headline the network's prime time lineup. Notable original game shows produced during this time were Catch 21 (which would be revived in 2019), Baggage (hosted by Jerry Springer), the first U.S. incarnation of The Chase, American Bible Challenge (the premiere of which drew an audience of nearly two million viewers), and Skin Wars. The network produced interactive program blocks, such as GSN Live and Playmania.

In March 2011, DirecTV (which by this point had acquired Liberty Media's then-65% stake in the network) sold a 5% stake in the network back to Sony Pictures Entertainment. Although DirecTV nominally remained the majority owner, Sony begin taking control of the network, and had the right to force Sony to increase its stake in GSN to 58%. On November 8, 2012, DirecTV sold an 18% interest in GSN to Sony. GSN partnered with Vubiquity to launch "GSN On Demand" on August 15, 2013.

=== 2017–present: Return to "Game Show Network" ===
In April 2017, David Goldhill resigned as president of the network after nearly 10 years. He was succeeded by Mark Feldman in August 2017. Later that year, the network would begin to refer to itself in promos by its full name. On October 1, 2018, the network's programming returned to focus on traditional game show formats, culminating in a rebranding that restored the network's full name.

The network's daily schedule would consist almost entirely of original programming, including new shows such as America Says, Common Knowledge, and People Puzzler. In April 2020, Game Show Network premiered Master Minds, a retool of a 2019 original show called Best Ever Trivia Show featuring Jeopardy! champion and host Ken Jennings, and now hosted by Brooke Burns, who hosted the GSN version of The Chase.

DirecTV's stake in Game Show Network would move to AT&T when it acquired the service in 2015. On November 18, 2019, it was announced that Sony had acquired AT&T's 42% stake and thus resumed full ownership of GSN. A list of 2020 Nielsen ratings published by Variety indicated that Game Show Network averaged 432,000 viewers in prime time, up 6% from the 2019 average.

In December 2021, Mark Feldman resigned after four years as Game Show Network president, to join the video game firm Scopely amid the gaming unit sale from Sony. He was succeeded by longtime executive John Zaccario.

On September 7, 2022, Dish Network and Sling TV removed Game Show Network from their lineups, after failing to reach a renewal agreement with owner Sony Pictures Television. The network returned to both services on September 27, 2022.

In April 2026, John Zaccario left Sony Pictures Television after 18 years with the company, with GSN folded into SPT's Game Shows division led by Suzanne Prete.

== Programming ==
Current original programming, as of November 2026 includes America Says. Reruns of former original shows airing on the network include Catch 21, Master Minds, Switch, Chain Reaction (both Dylan Lane-hosted incarnations), Beat the Bridge, and Split Second (Higgins version).

In October 2025, the network announced that it was developing a new original game show titled 100 Choices.

Game Show Network's acquired slate includes Match Game (1973–82 version hosted by Gene Rayburn), Family Feud (hosted by Steve Harvey), Family Feud Favorites, Flip Side, Deal or No Deal (NBC and CNBC versions), Jeopardy! (hosted by Alex Trebek), 25 Words or Less, Cash Cab (hosted by Ben Bailey), Press Your Luck (ABC revival hosted by Elizabeth Banks), Wheel of Fortune (hosted by Pat Sajak, Ryan Seacrest and Vanna White), The Wall, The Chase (ABC revival hosted by Sara Haines), The Perfect Line, Celebrity Wheel of Fortune (hosted by Pat Sajak and Vanna White), Celebrity Jeopardy! (hosted by Ken Jennings), The Floor (hosted by Rob Lowe), and Weakest Link hosted by Jane Lynch.

=== Syndication ===
Game Show Network began syndicating some of its original programming to other channels in the early 2010s. On June 24, 2013, the channel entered into an agreement with Bounce TV, giving it the broadcast rights to The Newlywed Game, Catch 21, and The American Bible Challenge. The American Bible Challenge aired in reruns on UP in fall 2013 and again in spring 2015. Drew Carey's Improv-A-Ganza aired on Laff in 2015. Reruns of America Says aired in syndication during the 2019–20 season. Reruns of People Puzzler began airing in syndication for the 2023–24 television season.

=== Game Show Central ===
Game Show Central
- Game Show Central logo used since March 28, 2020
- Country: United States
- Broadcast area: United States; Canada
- Headquarters: Santa Monica, California, U.S.

Programming
- Language: English
- Picture format: 480i (SDTV; widescreen)

Ownership
- Owner: Sony Pictures Television
- Parent: Game Show Network, LLC
- Sister channels: Crunchyroll Channel

History
- Launched: March 28, 2020; 6 years ago (as an AVOD streaming channel); February 17, 2025; 21 months ago (as an OTA multicast network)

Links
- Website: www.gameshowcentral.com

Availability

Terrestrial
- Digital terrestrial television: Available in select markets

Streaming media
- Internet Protocol television: Anoki LiveTVx, FuboTV, Google TV, Prime Video Live TV, LG Channels, Peacock, Plex, Philo, Pluto TV, Samsung TV Plus, Sling Freestream, TCL TV+, The CW app, The Roku Channel, Tubi, Vizio Watch Free+, Xumo Play

On March 28, 2020, the network launched Game Show Central, a digital streaming channel broadcasting archived GSN original programming. The network is currently available on Samsung and Vizio smart television sets and Paramount Skydance-owned AVOD platform Pluto TV (which also carries rival network Buzzr). Game Show Central features both current/recent Game Show Network originals like America Says and older shows such as Cram, Friend or Foe?, Minute to Win It, and Baggage. By 2023, a limited selection of syndicated shows originally acquired for Game Show Network's schedule (including 25 Words or Less and the Steve Harvey version of Family Feud) were incorporated into the schedule. The service became available on The Roku Channel (with a somewhat different schedule and shows compared to the Pluto TV stream) later in 2020. The service was made available globally via Plex in late July 2020.

On October 10, 2023, GSN partnered with sister company Crunchyroll, LLC to launch a Crunchyroll-branded FAST channel dedicated to anime and related programming. The Crunchyroll channel initially launched on October 11, 2023, on The Roku Channel, LG Channels, and Vizio WatchFree+ platforms.

Beginning on February 17, 2025, Game Show Central would also be offered as an over-the-air digital subchannel network, distributed in a hybrid OTA and cable/streaming model similar to that of Oxygen. At launch, it was primarily carried on stations (many of them being Ion Television affiliates) owned by the E. W. Scripps Company and Inyo Broadcast Holdings, replacing Sony-owned classic television network Get (which temporarily replaced Scripps News on their stations following that network's November 2024 conversion into a streaming-only service) on the majority of its charter affiliates. The broadcast feed maintains a separate schedule, incorporating additional archived Game Show Network originals not carried on the cable and streaming channels, including some previously featured on the streaming feed, such as The Newlywed Game (Sherri Shepherd and Carnie Wilson versions), Blank Slate, Best Ever Trivia Show, Winsanity and Lingo (Bill Engvall version).

== Online gaming ==
In the late 1990s and early 2000s, GSN's website at GSN.com offered Flash games based on GSN shows.

In 2007, Liberty Media acquired the Toronto-based FUN Technologies, operator of the popular online tournament casual game website WorldWinner. Following the acquisition, Liberty began to extend the GSN brand into online gaming by rebranding WorldWinner as a GSN service. GSN also launched a social gaming app on Facebook, now known as GSN Casino, featuring skill and casino games along with competitive tournaments. By October 2010, GSN Casino had over 8 million active users. GSN also developed a Wheel of Fortune app for Facebook, released in 2010.

GSN also published GSN Casino mobile apps, featuring various slot machine and bingo games in 2013, GSN Casino was the 10th highest-grossing app for iPad on the App Store. In January 2014, GSN acquired Bitrhymes Inc., developers of the social and mobile games Bingo Bash and Slots Bash, for an undisclosed amount. GSN had sued Bitrhymes in November 2013 following its prior offer to acquire the company, arguing that it had attempted to withdraw its offer and accept a different one during GSN's exclusive negotiation period.

In November 2014, the network announced that a show based on Bingo Bash was in development for Game Show Network's 2015 slate of original programming.

In October 2021, Sony sold the GSN Games subsidiary to mobile game developer Scopely in a $1 billion cash and stock deal. Sony then took a minority stake in Scopely. The service was subsequently renamed Royal Lounge Casino in 2026.

== See also ==
- Buzzr⁣ – a digital multicast network showcasing vintage game shows.
- Challenge⁣ – a British channel devoted to airing game shows and competition-based programs.
- GameTV⁣ – a Canadian channel that airs game shows and general entertainment programming.
- Nickelodeon Games and Sports for Kids⁣ – a now-defunct channel that aired Nickelodeon-produced game shows.
- The Game Channel⁣ – a Philippine channel focused on family game shows and reality shows.
