= Buzzy Cohen =

American game show contestant and music executive

- Born: Austin David Cohen; March 5, 1985 (age 41); Short Hills, New Jersey, U.S.
- Education: Columbia University (BA)
- Occupations: game show contestant; game show host
- Years active: 2016-present
- Known for: Jeopardy! 2017 Tournament of Champions winner "The Stunner" on The Chase
- Spouse: Elisha Levin (m. 2011)
- Children: 2

Austin David "Buzzy" Cohen (born March 5, 1985) is a recording music industry executive from Los Angeles, California. He is best known for his association with the game show Jeopardy! since 2016. Cohen was the winner of the 2017 Tournament of Champions and later appeared in the All-Star Games in 2019 and as a guest host for the show's 2021 Tournament of Champions following longtime host Alex Trebek's death. From 2022 to 2024, Cohen served as a co-host for the show's podcast, Inside Jeopardy!

== Early life ==
Cohen grew up in Millburn, New Jersey. He graduated from the Pingry School in 2003, and graduated from Columbia College of Columbia University with a Bachelor's in music in 2007.

== Career ==
=== Jeopardy! appearances ===
Cohen won $166,603 over nine games in April and May 2016. His first game aired on April 25, where he unseated six-day champion Andrew Pau. A few of Cohen's victories were guaranteed victories, which allowed Cohen to wager nothing and use his final response to make sarcastic remarks towards host Alex Trebek, a humorous style that earned Cohen both praise and disdain from Jeopardy! fans. He later returned for the 2017 Tournament of Champions, which he won, collecting the grand prize of $250,000.

Cohen appeared again in the 2019 Jeopardy! All-Star Games relay tournament. His team went home with $75,000 after losing the wild card match.

Following Trebek's death, Cohen hosted the May 2021 Jeopardy! Tournament of Champions, being the youngest Jeopardy! host at age 36.

In February 2022, Cohen appeared as a Jeopardy! contestant in a Planet Fitness commercial alongside Lindsay Lohan and Dennis Rodman, which aired during Super Bowl LVI.

From 2022 to 2024, Cohen appeared as a recurring guest and host on the Inside Jeopardy! podcast hosted by current Jeopardy! showrunners Michael Davies and Sarah Whitcomb Foss. He left the position in September 2024 and was replaced by Sam Buttrey.

In September 2022, Cohen appeared as a Clue Giver in the category "Fashion with Buzzy Cohen" during the Triple Jeopardy! round on the first episode Celebrity Jeopardy! on ABC. On September 29, 2022, Cohen hosted the inaugural Jeopardy! Honors event alongside Sarah Whitcomb Foss.

From April to August 2023, Cohen hosted a podcast about the quiz show entitled This is Jeopardy!: The Story of America's Favorite Quiz Show for Sony Music Entertainment and Sony Pictures Television.

In January 2024, Cohen hosted three radio-only "play-in" games for that year's new Champions Wildcard tournament.

In 2025, during Season 41, Cohen joined the show's writing team.

=== Other appearances ===
In April and May 2020, Cohen appeared on the revival of Who Wants to Be a Millionaire on ABC as a lifeline for comedian Hannibal Burress.

Cohen joined the cast of the American version of The Chase in 2022, joining as a Chaser as a replacement for the departing Ken Jennings. His Chaser name is "The Stunner". Fellow Chaser James Holzhauer described Cohen's playing style and persona as "happy-go-lucky", compared to Holzhauer's own cutthroat, villain-like role.

In May 2024, Cohen appeared as a contestant on the podcast Go Fact Yourself on KPCC (FM). That same year, in June, he began hosting The Einstein Challenge for The History Channel.

Cohen was also featured at the 2023 and 2024 editions of SporcleCon, the annual convention run by the trivia website Sporcle. He hosted the main event of the convention, a massive team trivia competition called Battle of the Brains, in both years and also conducted his own 1990s trivia quiz called Baby Got Facts.

== Personal life ==
In 2011, Cohen married Elisha Levin, a marketing and communications director. They have two daughters.

== Filmography ==
| Year | Title | Role | Notes |
|---|---|---|---|
| 2016-2021 | Jeopardy! | Himself | 35 episodes |
| 2020 | Who Wants to Be a Millionaire | Himself | 2 episodes |
| 2022 | Planet Fitness: What's Gotten Into Lindsay? | Jeopardy! Host | Short film |
| 2022 | The Chase | Himself | 2 episodes |
| 2022 | Celebrity Jeopardy! | Clue Giver | 1 episode |
| 2022-2024 | Inside Jeopardy! | Guest/Host | 51 episodes |
| 2023 | This is Jeopardy!: The Story of America's Favorite Quiz Show | Himself | 16 episodes |
| 2024 | Watch What Happens Live with Andy Cohen | Bartender | 1 episode |
| 2024 | Go Fact Yourself | Contestant | 1 episode |
| 2024 | The Einstein Challenge | Host | |
