= Jonathan Corbblah =

US game show competitor and chess master (born 1979)

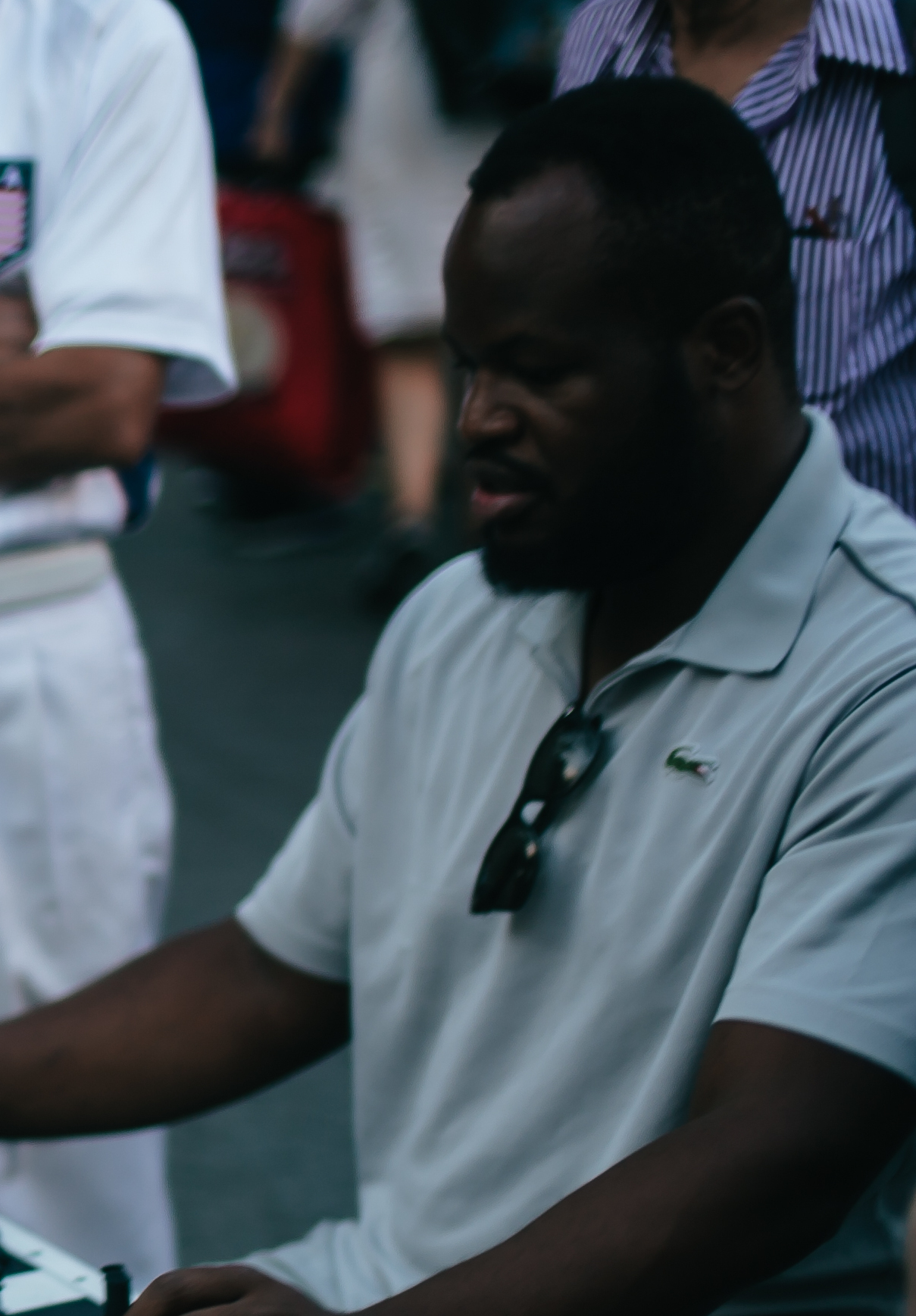
- Corbblah in 2015
- Born: 1979 (age 46–47)
- Occupations: Coach; teacher
- Known for: Competing on game shows

Jonathan Corbblah (born October 21, 1979) is a chess master from New York City, known for his appearances on many American game shows.

== Personal life ==
Jonathan Corbblah was born on October 21, 1979. In first grade, Corbblah struggled to read and was nearly held back; his father, a preacher, withdrew him from the school and tutored him intensively over the summer, and Corbblah began second grade well ahead of his class.

In December 2010, he was married and living in Harlem. By February 2014, he was coaching individuals and teams for national trivia championships, and taught Scrabble to schoolchildren. As of 2025, Corbblah had taught chess in New York City public and private schools for more than 20 years, including at the Trinity School; in May 2025, his students won the K–1 team championship at the SuperNationals VIII scholastic tournament.

== Games and game shows ==
Corbblah learned to play chess at age six or seven. He began competing at around age 12 and, after a hiatus, resumed playing as a high school junior against players in New York City parks, which he credits with his rise toward master level. According to the United States Chess Federation, since he began playing ranked matches in the late 1990s, Corbblah has a top regular Elo rating of 2199 (earned between 2010 and 2014) and a top blitz rating of 2262 (in 2019). In December 2002, he became a USCF Candidate Master, and in 2014, Pacific Standard reported he was a master-level chess player.

Corbblah was eleven years old in 1990 when he appeared on his first game show, PBS' Where in the World Is Carmen Sandiego?. In December 2010, after his two days on Jeopardy!, he told ABC News that "I'm trying to go on as many possible game shows as I can"; he has appeared on at least ten.

Date(s)	Show	Result	Citation(s)
1990	Where in the World Is Carmen Sandiego?	A basketball and US$100 (equivalent to $246.43 in 2025)	
July 23, 2004	Who Wants to Be a Millionaire	US$32,000 (equivalent to $54,545 in 2025)	
December 13, 2010; December 14, 2010	Jeopardy!	$14,000 (equivalent to $20,670 in 2025)	
August 6, 2013	The Chase	$60,000 (equivalent to $82,929 in 2025); Shared with two other contestants	
December 17, 2014	Wheel of Fortune	$14,500 (equivalent to $19,720 in 2025)	
May 21, 2015	500 Questions	Unable to defeat Steve Bahnaman	
October 10, 2024	Trivial Pursuit	Unknown	

In summer 2019, he was a guest expert on several episodes of Best Ever Trivia Show, and then as a master mind on several 2020–2021 episodes of Master Minds. He has also won $1,500 on Cash Cab.
