= Batman OnStar commercials =

"Batman OnStar"
- "Batman OnStar" ad
- Directed by: Vincent Ward; Andrew Davis
- Written by: Nancy Wellinger; Jim Millis
- Produced by: Peter MacGregor-Scott
- Starring: Bruce Thomas; Curtis Armstrong; Brooke Burns; Brian Stepanek; Michael Gough
- Production companies: Millennium Pictures; Warner Bros.
- Country: United States
- Language: English

The Batman OnStar commercials were a series of six television commercials featuring comic book superhero Batman, created by ad-agency Campbell-Ewald and based on the Tim Burton/Joel Schumacher Batman film series, airing from 2000 to the beginning of 2002. The commercials promoted the use of the automobile onboard guiding system OnStar. The commercials were successful, leading to a large increase in subscribers and a higher rate of subscriber renewals.

== Production ==
Two of the commercials ("Hot Date" and "Riddle Me This") were directed by Vincent Ward, while the other four were directed by Andrew Davis, working with Director of Photography Thomas Kloss. The production company was Millennium Pictures (Detroit), special effects were provided by Flash Film Works, and the scripts were written by Nancy Wellinger and Jim Millis. The Batman OnStar commercials helped promote brand name awareness of the system, leading to a large increase in subscribers and a higher rate of subscriber renewals.

The commercials were shot at the Warner Bros. lot. Flash Film Works did the special effects, including creating and compositing the Bat-Signal, airbag, the Riddler's skywriting (copying the writing style from Batman Forever) and erasing/covering various shots of the Warner backlot. Back in 1997, John Dykstra chose Flash Film Works to work on the motion picture Batman & Robin. They created a digital matte painting of an ice-laden Gotham City, as well as performing some rig and wire removal work on the film.

OnStar's licensing agreement with DC Comics had additional benefits, as the production teams were given access to DC's creative resources. The advertisements were thus able to use the 'real' Batcave (which was constructed at the Queen Mary Dome in Long Beach, CA), as well as utilizing the Batmobile that was featured in the two Tim Burton-directed Batman films (Batman and Batman Returns). Also featured in the OnStar commercials was composer Danny Elfman's score from the films. The Batsuit that was featured in the commercials was not specifically designed or tailored for Bruce Thomas, the actor that played Batman in the ads, who said it was simply made up of "bits and pieces of stunt guy's suits that fit me". Given the time period it is likely that most of the suit pieces were left over from Batman & Robin. Thomas was trained to "be Batman" by stunt coordinator Alex Daniels, who also performed the stunts in the OnStar commercials. Daniels was already a veteran of the Batman franchise, having done stunts on Batman Forever and Batman & Robin, on which he was also a stunt coordinator. According to Bruce Thomas, much of the crew working on the commercials had also worked on the Batman films.

In addition to set, costume, and prop details, DC provided access to footage from the films (in particular, scenes of Batman jumping from a building in "Minor Setbacks" derive from the films) to emphasize the differences between Batman's use of the OnStar system and the more normal, mundane usage. In addition to DC having input on the scripts, customer research reminded the company that "Batman always gets the villain," which had apparently been missed.

=== Cast ===
Bruce Thomas portraying Batman in an OnStar commercial, c. 2001

The actor portraying Batman in the OnStar spots is Bruce Thomas, Curtis Armstrong portrays the Joker in one of the ads, Vicki Vale is played by Brooke Burns, and the Riddler is played by Brian Stepanek in one of the ads. Michael Gough, who portrays Bruce Wayne's butler, Alfred Pennyworth, in the Batman films directed by Tim Burton and Joel Schumacher, reprises his role in the OnStar ads. The voice of OnStar Representative, Karen Boyd, is that of Joanna Rubiner.

=== Cost ===
OnStar began a $50 million ad campaign in February 2000, although it is unknown precisely how much of that number was set aside to make the Batman commercials. In 2002, GM dropped Batman as the spokesman, replacing him with radio ads.

== The ads ==
Following on from OnStar's earliest TV ads playing on childhood fears and out-of-car personal testimonials, the company licensed Batman to market its "year 2000 factory-installed version," in the "world's most technological car," referring to the Batmobile. OnStar marketer Michael McEnaney described the premise as demonstrating that: "If OnStar empowers Batman, consumers will get that OnStar can help them 'handle anything that life throws at them.'" The ads demonstrated "examples of possible driving dangers, while remaining in the realm of fantasy," thereby downplaying the "scary side of danger," as well as making the spots "vehicle-neutral at a time when OnStar became available on 29 different GM models."

The six commercials are as follows:

1. "Batcave" (AKA "Batman & Alfred") - Alfred, Batman's butler, introduces him to OnStar, saying that the addition will increase safety in the Batmobile.
2. "Joker Face" - Batman chases the Joker through the streets of Gotham. Joker pushes a button to erect a barricade that Batman collides with, deploying his airbag. He instructs the OnStar representative to get the police to set up a roadblock, and catches him.
3. "Minor Setbacks" (AKA "Batman Uses OnStar") - Batman calls OnStar to unlock his door and to find the closest gasoline station.
4. "Batmobile" (AKA "Batman & Gordon") - Batman uses OnStar to call Commissioner Gordon to tell him he is coming.
5. "Hot Date" - The Penguin is chasing Batman, so Batman uses OnStar to call Vicki Vale to tell her that he will be late.
6. "Riddle Me This" (AKA "Riddler") - Batman accesses his mail through the OnStar Virtual Advisor. The computer reads aloud the message that the villain, the Riddler, has sent: "What do a river and money have in common?" Batman deduces that the Riddler is heading to Gotham Bank and catches him.

== Tie-ins ==
=== Comics ===
Two special edition Batman comic books were released in conjunction with the ads. The first one was a five-page story featuring the Riddler. The second one was an eight-page story featuring Mr. Freeze.

In addition to print comics, OnStar and DC Comics created a "state-of-the-art animated interactive comic for the Web, at www.onstar.com," which let readers "shape their experience by using Personal Calling and OnStar Virtual Advisor at critical moments in the story." Both Bruce Thomas and Curtis Armstrong reprised their roles from the live-action ads, voicing Batman and the Joker respectively in the "webisodes".

=== Trading cards ===
An oversize, 5 in × 3 in (127 mm × 76 mm) (when separated at the perforations) trading card set was distributed at trade shows to promote OnStar's vehicle services, using their licensed Batman "sponsor". They were issued as perforated 8-card strips, sealed with tape (and the tape seal cannot be removed without damaging the cards). The back of the cards describes OnStar's services, as well as providing contact information. They also give a brief history of Batman from his debut in 1939 through his adding new OnStar tools to the Batmobile in the year 2002.

=== Sweepstakes ===
As part of the ad-campaign, OnStar and DC offered (from May 31, 2001) an online sweepstakes chance to win "a walk-on role in the next Batman movie," which was then "still in the planning stages," albeit "with no firm dates set yet."

== Impact ==
A survey showed that 80% of new vehicle owners recognized the brand due to the Batman OnStar commercials. New activations of OnStar service jumped 169% to nearly 300,000 subscribers between January and June 2000. Renewal rate of the service also increased from 32% to 58%. Edward Baig said that the commercials set "lofty expectations" for OnStar service in his review. Further estimates suggest an even higher increase, suggesting that the commercials raised OnStar's customer base by a factor of ten:

"In the year 2000, OnStar expanded its customer base from 100,000 to 1 million subscribers. That dramatic growth comes thanks in part to branding efforts that use a comic book character dating back to the 1930s: Batman and his Batmobile."

=== Awards ===
The first four commercials won a Silver Award for "Creative Arts - Visual Effects" in the 2000 International Automotive Advertising Awards. The campaign was further awarded the Detroit Creative Directors Council Golden Caddy for Best in Show.

The "Batman" campaign also received the Golden Medal and Best of Category awards in the New York Festival's Advertising/Marketing Effectiveness Awards in 2001.
