= David Goldhill =

American businessman

David Goldhill is an American business executive and writer on healthcare policy. He is the CEO and co-founder of Sesame, an online marketplace for discounted health services, and chair of the board of directors at the Leapfrog Group, an independent organization for hospital and medical safety. Goldhill is also a senior fellow at the Manhattan Institute.

== Health care writings ==
In September 2009, Goldhill was the author of the cover story in The Atlantic titled How American Health Care Killed My Father. In the article and other stories in Bloomberg, The New York Times, The Washington Post, and The Wall Street Journal, Goldhill has noted that the problems in American health care are the intermediaries that serve as the primary customers – employers, insurance companies and government insurers. As for his writing, health care providers are more responsive to the needs of those intermediaries than to the needs of patients. Though his writings focus on increasing the role of consumers and markets in driving health care innovation, Goldhill also argued that America's highly politicized policy-making had led to extensive industry capture of Medicare, Medicaid, and other government health programs, warping their mission. Goldhill has more recent opinion pieces published in The Washington Post such as his 2024 work on Insurance is what makes U.S. health-care prices so high which has sparked conversations.

Goldhill has published three books on health care:

1. Catastrophic Care: Why Everything We Think We Know about Health Care Is Wrong (Knopf, 2013)
2. New York’s Next Health Care Revolution, co-edited with Paul Howard (Manhattan Institute 2015)
3. The Real Costs of American Health Care (Vintage 2016)

== Reception and criticism ==
For Goldhill's article in The Atlantic, David Brooks from The New York Times wrote “If I were magically given an hour to help Barack Obama prepare for his health care speech next week, the first thing I’d do is ask him to read David Goldhill’s essay.” Fareed Zakaria on CNN called it “The best article I have read on American health care” and John Schwenker at The American Conservative referred to it as “maybe the best writing on health care”. Juliet Eilperin of The Washington Post felt that David's book, Catastrophic Care, “provided a persuasive case for applying free-market principles and greater transparency to the health-care industry”.

Goldhill's book Catastrophic Care was criticized by Arnold Relman, from The New York Review of Books, arguing that the system Goldhill advocates for is “unfair to patients with limited means, because it forces them to choose between spending on medical care they might need and saving their funds for other needed or desired purposes.”

With the increase of Sesame in the news, several notable publications have discussed Goldhill's work such as PR Newswire, Bloomberg, and USA Today.

== Business career ==
From 2007 to 2017 Goldhill was the CEO of GSN, the operator of the cable Game Show Network. As chairman and CEO of INTH (Independent Network Television Holdings), he founded the TV3 Russia national broadcast network which was acquired by Interros Group in 2007 for $550 million. He was also the president and CEO of television for Universal Studios, up to its acquisition by GE in 2004. He was the chief financial officer of Act III Communications, a private production company. Goldhill has served as director for CommerceHub (CHUBA), Expedia (EXPE), and eLong (LONG).

As of 2019, Goldhill is the co-founder and CEO of Sesame, an online marketplace for discounted health services serving uninsured patients and other direct-pay customers; and chair of the board of directors of the Leapfrog Group, an independent national employer-sponsored organization focused on hospital and medical safety.

== Education ==
Goldhill graduated from Harvard University with a Bachelor of Arts degree in history and holds a master's degree in history from New York University.
