= Brooke Burns =

American fashion model and game show host (born 1978)

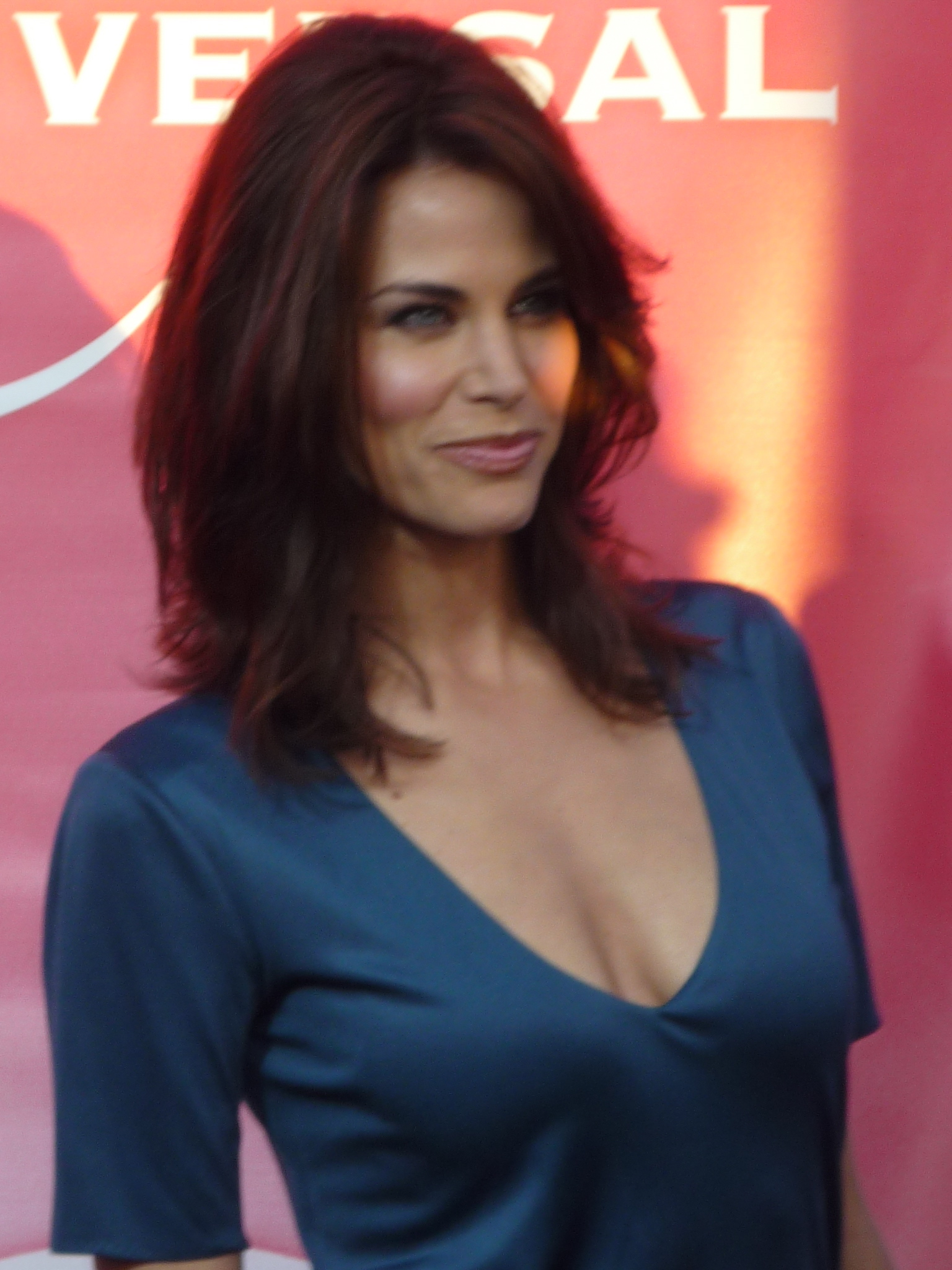
- Burns in July 2010
- Born: Brooke Elizabeth Burns; March 16, 1978 (age 48); Dallas, Texas, U.S.
- Occupations: Actor; television host; model
- Years active: 1996–present
- Height: 5 ft 8 1/2 in (1.74 m)
- Spouses: Julian McMahon (m. 1999; div. 2001); Gavin O'Connor (m. 2013)
- Children: 2

Brooke Elizabeth Burns (born March 16, 1978) is an American actress, fashion model, game show host, and television personality. Burns began her television career in 1995, portraying the supporting character Peg in the Spanish-American teen sitcom Out of the Blue (1995–1996), appearing in all episodes. Burns joined the cast of the action drama series Baywatch in 1998 and subsequently starred in Baywatch's second rendition, Baywatch: Hawaii, until she left the show owing to her first pregnancy. She appeared in 33 episodes.

After her hiatus, Burns returned to television. She appeared in several guest roles, including in the NBC sitcom Just Shoot Me!, and played a major role in the American soap opera North Shore, appearing in all 21 episodes.

Burns has hosted several game shows, including Dog Eat Dog for NBC, Hole in the Wall for Fox, plus The Chase and a revival of Tic-Tac-Dough, both on Game Show Network. The Chase was nominated at the 41st Daytime Emmy Awards for the Daytime Emmy Award for Outstanding Game Show, and two years later Burns was nominated for the Daytime Emmy Award for Outstanding Game Show Host. In addition to television, Burns has also appeared in minor roles in several films. She appeared in the romantic comedy Shallow Hal, the mockbuster disaster Titanic II, and the drama Where Hope Grows (2014).

== Early life ==
Burns was born in Dallas, Texas. Burns grew up in a Christian family, with a father in the oil business who also did missionary work.

At age 16, Burns moved with her family to Europe, living later in Paris, Milan, and Munich.

== Career ==
=== Television ===
From 1998 to 2001, Burns starred in Baywatch and Baywatch: Hawaii as the character Jessie Owens. In 2001, she appeared as Vicki Vale in one of several "Batman" commercials for OnStar opposite Bruce Thomas's Batman. Burns hosted NBC's Dog Eat Dog from June 2002 to August 2003 and was nominated for a Teen Choice Award. Burns starred in North Shore, a prime-time soap opera that ran for 21 episodes in 2004 and 2005. In 2006, she starred in the WB series Pepper Dennis, playing Kathy Dinkle. In 2009, Burns appeared in the first 12 episodes of the updated Melrose Place, playing Vanessa, the most recent wife of Dr. Michael Mancini (Thomas Calabro) and mother of his older son's five-year-old son, Noah. Burns was given the chance to participate in the first season of the ABC celebrity diving reality competition Splash but turned it down because of an injury she had received when diving a few years before.

Burns has also appeared on Ally McBeal, Drop Dead Diva, CSI: Miami, To Tell the Truth, and Average Joe: Hawaii. She was nominated for an Emmy in 2016 for best game show host on the GSN game show The Chase with Mark Labbett and hosted Master Minds from 2020 until 2023.

=== Film ===
For her role in the 2001 film Shallow Hal, the Farrelly brothers wrote a specific part for Burns after deciding during her audition that she was the "prettiest dorky girl" they'd met. She appeared in a Hallmark Channel Christmas movie, The Most Wonderful Time of the Year, co-starring Henry Winkler, on December 13, 2008. Other films include Smokejumpers, Dancing Trees, Trophy Wife, Art of Travel, and Time and Again. Burns appears in the Nickelback video "Trying Not to Love You" opposite Jason Alexander. Burns and Alexander both appeared in Shallow Hal. In 2017, she appeared in a Hallmark movie, Christmas Connection, starring a leading role as Sydney.

== Personal life ==
Burns was married to actor Julian McMahon from 1999 to 2001. McMahon was the son of the former Prime Minister of Australia Sir William McMahon. They have a daughter who was born in June 2000.

Burns began dating actor Bruce Willis in August 2003. Rumoured to have become engaged in April 2004, they broke up in June 2004.

On June 22, 2013, she married film director Gavin O'Connor. She resides in Los Angeles.

In October 2016, it was announced that Burns was expecting her second child, a girl who was born in 2017.

=== Health and injuries ===
On November 11, 2005, Burns broke her neck in a diving accident. Although she made a full recovery, she has a fusion in her neck consisting of a titanium plate, rod, and 10 screws. In May 2014, Burns was involved in a car crash in Los Angeles.

=== Charitable activities ===
When Burns was filming Baywatch, she was involved with Camp Baywatch, teaching inner-city children to swim and lifeguard. She also supports the Life Rolls On Foundation, an organization that aims to help people with spinal cord injuries return to an active lifestyle. In 2006, as a result of her diving injury, she became involved with the Think First National Injury Prevention Foundation and the North American Spine Society, which aim to raise awareness of spinal injuries. In 2021, Burns appeared on Celebrity Wheel of Fortune, playing for the Just Keep Livin' Foundation. The organization helps teenagers across the country.

== Filmography ==
=== Film ===
Year	Film	Role	Notes
2001	Shallow Hal	Pretty / Ugly Katrina	
2005	The Salon	Tami	
2005	Single White Female 2: The Psycho	Jan Lambert	Direct-to-DVD
2005	Death to the Supermodels	Eva	Direct-to-DVD
2006	Murder on Spec	Kate Graham	
2007	Urban Decay	Sasha	
2008	The Art of Travel	Darlene Loren	
2008	Smoke Jumper aka Trial by Fire	Kristin Scott	Lifetime TV movie
2009	Dancing Trees	Nicole	
2010	Titanic II	Dr. Kim Patterson	Direct-to-DVD
2015	Where Hope Grows	Amy Boone	

=== Television ===
Year	Title	Role	Notes
1996	Out of the Blue	Peg	22 episodes
1997	Conan the Adventurer	Hearth	Episode: "The Three Virgins"
1997	Ally McBeal	The Girl / Jennifer Higgin	4 episodes
1998–2001	Baywatch & Baywatch: Hawaii	Jessie Owens	46 episodes
1999	Mortal Kombat: Conquest	Lori	Episode: "Festival of Death"
2001	Hot Date	Vicki Vale	OnStar commercial
2002	Men, Women & Dogs	Kristle	Episode: "Cheese Dog"
2002	A Nero Wolfe Mystery	Beatrice Epps	2 episodes
2002–2003	Dog Eat Dog	Host	26 episodes
2002–2003	Just Shoot Me!	Kelly / Cover model	2 episodes
2003	She Spies	Nicki Shields	Episode: "The Replacement"
2003	Rock Me Baby	Erin "White Chocolate" Rimsing	Episode: "Girl Power"
2004–2005	North Shore	Nicole Booth	21 episodes
2006	Modern Men	Angelica	Episode: "Give 'Til You Learn"
2006	Pepper Dennis	Kathy Dinkle Williams	13 episodes
2006	Trophy Wife	Kate Graham	Television film (Lifetime)
2007	Time and Again	Anna Malone	Television film (Lifetime)
2008	Trial by Fire	Kristen	Television film (Lifetime)
2008	The Most Wonderful Time of the Year	Jennifer Cullen	Television film (Hallmark)
2008	Miss Guided	Lisa Germain	7 episodes
2008–2009	Hole in the Wall	Co-host	18 episodes
2009	Mistresses	Shannon Barnes	Television film (Lifetime)
2009	CSI: Miami	Bonnie Galinetti / Marci Reeger	Episode: "Chip/Tuck"
2009	Drop Dead Diva	Christy Talbot	Episode: "Dead Model Walking"
2009	Melrose Place	Vanessa Mancini	6 episodes
2011	You Deserve It	Hostess	6 episodes
2011	Fixing Pete	Ashley	Television film (Hallmark)
2011	Borderline Murder	Abby Morgan	Television film (Lifetime Movies)
2012	Undercover Bridesmaid	Tanya	Television film (Hallmark)
2012	A Star for Christmas	Skylar	Television film (ION)
2013	A Sister's Revenge	Suzanne Dunne	Television film (Lifetime)
2013–2015	The Chase	Host	51 episodes
2014	Motor City Masters	Host	10 episodes
2015	Community	E.T. Host	Episode: "Intro to Recycled Cinema"
2015–2017; 2020	Gourmet Detective	Detective Maggie Price	Hallmark Movies & Mysteries series
2017	Christmas Connection	Sydney	Television film (Hallmark)
2020–2023	Master Minds	Host	Game show
2021	Celebrity Wheel of Fortune	Herself	Celebrity contestant; 1 episode
2025–present	Tic-Tac-Dough	Host	Game show

Media offices
Preceded by Patrick Wayne	Host of Tic Tac Dough; 2024-Present	Incumbent
