= Master Minds (game show) =

American game show

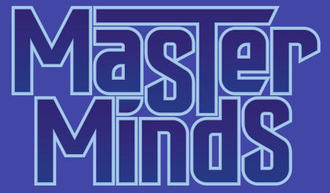
- Also known as: Best Ever Trivia Show (season 1)
- Genre: Game show
- Written by: Michael J. Prescott
- Directed by: Hal Grant
- Presented by: Sherri Shepherd; Brooke Burns; Muffy Marracco (three episodes)
- Starring: Ken Jennings; Muffy Marracco; Jonathan Corbblah; Arianna Haut; Ryan Chaffee; Raj Dhuwalia; Susannah Brooks; David Schuchinski; Lakedra Pam; Mark Labbett; Monica Thieu
- Composers: Vincent Ott; Ian Honeyman
- Country of origin: United States
- Original language: English
- No. of seasons: 5
- No. of episodes: 325

Production
- Executive producers: Brennan Huntington; Rich Sirop; Ed Egan
- Producer: Dave Schapiro
- Production location: Los Angeles
- Production company: Game Show Enterprises

Original release
- Network: Game Show Network
- Release: June 10, 2019 – November 21, 2023

Master Minds is an American game show that aired on the Game Show Network from 2019 to 2023.

The show debuted on June 10, 2019, under the name Best Ever Trivia Show. It was hosted by Sherri Shepherd and regularly featuring Ken Jennings, Muffy Marracco, Jonathan Corbblah, Arianna Haut, and Ryan Chaffee.

The series was renamed Master Minds on April 6, 2020, with Brooke Burns replacing Shepherd.

== Gameplay ==
In both cases, the show features three contestants competing against three "trivia experts." The pool of experts includes Ken Jennings, Muffy Marracco, Raj Dhuwalia, Arianna Haut, Ryan Chaffee, Susannah Brooks, David Schuchinski, Jonathan Corbblah, Lakedra Pam, Mark Labbett, and Monica Thieu. The winning contestant faces off against the best-performing expert in the "Ultimate Trivia Challenge."

=== Best Ever Trivia Show ===
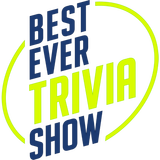
Logo for Season 1, when the show was titled Best Ever Trivia Show

==== Round 1 ====
In the first round, one of the contestants selects one of two categories for the round, and then also selects one of the three experts to play along with the round. The contestants are asked four questions in the category, each question has three multiple-choice options. Everyone (including the other two experts) secretly and simultaneously locks in their answers, a contestant's correct answer is worth 50 points if the chosen expert got it right, and 100 points if not. Answers given by the experts not chosen are generally not revealed.

==== Round 2 ====
The second round is played similarly to the first round. However:

- The category not selected in the first round is made available again, along with a new category.
- The selection of category and expert is now made by the leading contestant.
- A different expert must be selected.
- There are only three questions in this round.
- The value for each question is now 100 points if the expert gets it right, and 200 points if not.

==== Round 3 ====
The last remaining expert plays in this round, and the leading contestant chooses one of two new categories. Unlike in the previous rounds, the chosen expert secretly submits an answer first, and then, without disclosing their answer, states how confident they are in their answer. Based on the expert's stated confidence level, and their own knowledge, the contestants may either use the expert's answer, sight unseen, for 200 points, or try to select the correct answer themselves for 400 points. This round lasts for a maximum of three questions, the contestant with the most points at the end of this round wins $1,000 and plays the "Ultimate Trivia Challenge." If several contestants become mathematically impossible for trailing players to overtake the leader, the game ends immediately.

In the event of a tie, the players involved in the tie are asked one additional question. The player who submits the correct answer the fastest wins the game.

==== Ultimate Trivia Challenge ====
The day's winner plays the Ultimate Trivia Challenge against the expert who performed the best on all questions asked during the game (based on most correct answers and fastest time). The contestant and the expert are asked five questions, again with three multiple choice options. Whoever answers more questions correctly wins the round, if this is the contestant, their winnings are increased to $10,000. If either of the two participants aren’t able to catch up, the round ends immediately.

If the scores are tied after five questions, then the contestant is asked the "Ultimate Trivia Question", which is a question chosen by all three experts offstage before the show. The contestant also wins the $10,000 if they answer the Ultimate Trivia Question correctly.

A contestant who wins the $10,000, whether by outscoring the expert or by correctly answering the Ultimate Trivia Question, returns to play again on the next show. Any contestant that wins the Ultimate Trivia Challenge three times is invited back for future shows to play as an expert in addition to their total winnings of $30,000.

=== Master Minds ===
In this season, all six participants compete against one another in three rounds. Point scores are kept for both contestants and experts (now called "Master Minds"), and the winners of both groups face off in the final Ultimate Trivia Challenge.

==== Round 1 ====
All six participants are asked seven questions, each on a different topic, and each with three multiple choice options. All participants secretly and simultaneously lock in their answers, each correct answer is worth 100 points.

==== Round 2 ====
This round consists of five open-ended questions, each on a different topic. The first four questions are worth 200 points, and the last 400 points. After the question is read, the contestants and Master Minds buzz in for the right to answer. Only the first contestant and first Master Mind to buzz in can answer. If the answer is correct, the points are added to those participants' scores, but in this round, incorrect answers result in a score deduction. After the 400-point question is asked, the lowest-scoring contestant and lowest-scoring Master Mind are eliminated from further play. In the event of a tie for lowest score, a tiebreaker question is played on the buzzers between the tied participants, answers are given verbally in the tiebreaker. If a player answers correctly, they advance to the next round (no points are awarded for winning a tiebreaker). If they give an incorrect answer or no answer, they are eliminated.

For the fourth season, round 2 was changed to remove the buzz-in element, all contestants and Master Minds write in their answers for all five questions. Points are also no longer deducted for incorrect answers.

==== Round 3 ====
In this round, all questions are asked on the buzzers, and answers are given verbally. The two contestants face off for 60 seconds. In the first two seasons, the clock started at the beginning of the first question, starting in the third season, the clock starts when the first question is completed. The first question is worth 500 points, and each subsequent question is worth 100 points more. As in Round 2, contestants cannot buzz in until the question is completed, but unlike Round 2, there is no penalty for incorrect answers; instead, their opponent can steal the points with a correct answer. The contestant with the higher score wins $1,000. The Master Minds compete with the same format, on a new set of questions, to determine which Master Mind will take on the winning contestant in the Ultimate Trivia Challenge. If there is a tie, a tiebreaker as in Round 2 is played.

==== Ultimate Trivia Challenge/Showdown ====
From season one, this round consisted of five open-ended questions. The contestant answers the questions while the Master Mind is isolated offstage, the Master Mind then returns to the stage to answer the same five questions. The correct answers are revealed after both the contestant and Master Mind have played.

From season two, a previous format was changed so that both the contestant and the Master Mind are onstage at the same time, writing their answers simultaneously. The correct answers are revealed after both participants have revealed their answers. The round ends immediately if a contestant became impossible for the trailing player to tie (for example: Score of 3–0).

From season three, the Ultimate Trivia Showdown was reduced to four questions.

The contestant wins the round either by outscoring the Master Mind, or by tying and then correctly answering the Ultimate Trivia Question. If the contestant wins the round, they win $10,000 and return on the next show. As before, if the contestant wins the $10,000 three times (two times in season 3), they are invited to become a Master Mind.

To date, seven contestants have accomplished this: Kelly Gerhold, Lauren Cusitello, Cliff Galiher, Brendan Sargent, John Rhodes, Tim McCaigue, and Amanda Graver won after the rule change in February, April, August, September, October, and November 2023, lowering the threshold for winning to two wins beginning in season 3.

== Production ==
Best Ever Trivia Show premiered on June 10, 2019, and ran every weekday for 65 episodes until September 6, 2019.

In March 2020, the show was renamed to Master Minds, with Brooke Burns replacing Sherri Shepherd as host. Master Minds debuted with a new format on April 6, 2020, with 65 episodes until June 26, 2020.

On November 18, 2020, it was announced that the second season would premiere on December 7, 2020. For the second season, due to the COVID-19 pandemic in the United States, the contestants and Master Minds are spaced further apart (and the Master Minds now have individual podiums).

On March 25, 2021, GSN renewed the show for a third season, which premiered on January 9, 2023, with Mark Labbett replacing Ken Jennings as an expert.

On March 28, 2023, GSN renewed the show for a fourth season, which premiered on August 7, 2023, with Monica Thieu joining as an expert.
