= The Chase (American game show) =

American television quiz show

- Genre: Game show
- Based on: The Chase by: Danny Carvalho; Pete Faherty; Chris Gepp; Elliot Johnson; Matt Pritchard; Amanda Wilson
- Directed by: Hal Grant (2013–15); Rich DiPirro (2021–23)
- Presented by: Brooke Burns; Sara Haines
- Starring: Mark Labbett; James Holzhauer; Ken Jennings; Brad Rutter; Victoria Groce; Brandon Blackwell; Buzzy Cohen
- Announcer: Shawn Parr; Brad Abelle
- Country of origin: United States
- Original language: English
- No. of seasons: 4 (GSN); 3 (ABC)
- No. of episodes: 51 (GSN); 47 (ABC)

Production
- Executive producers: Bob Boden (2013–15); Michael Kelpie (2013–15); Martin Scott (2013–15); David Eilenberg (2021–22); David George (2021–23); Bernie Schaeffer (2021–23); Adam Sher (2021–23); Vincent Rubino (2021–23); Simon Thomas (2022–23)
- Running time: 42–44 minutes
- Production company: ITV Entertainment (Note: Known as ITV Studios America for the GSN version.)

Original release
- Network: GSN
- Release: August 6, 2013 – December 11, 2015
- Network: ABC
- Release: January 7, 2021 – July 20, 2023

Related
- The Chase (British game show); The Chase Australia

The Chase is an American television quiz show adapted from the British program of the same name. It premiered on August 6, 2013, on the Game Show Network (GSN). It was hosted by Brooke Burns and featured Mark Labbett as the "chaser" (referred to on air exclusively by his nickname "the Beast"). A revival of the show premiered on January 7, 2021, on ABC. It was hosted by Sara Haines and initially featured as the chasers Jeopardy! champions James Holzhauer (who was a contestant on the GSN version), Ken Jennings, and Brad Rutter. Labbett returned as a chaser in June 2021, before stepping down in 2022 along with Jennings. In their place are Buzzy Cohen, Brandon Blackwell, and Victoria Groce.

The American version of the show followed the same general format as the British version, but with teams of three contestants instead of four. The game was a quiz competition in which contestants attempted to win money by challenging a quizzing expert known as the chaser. Each contestant participated in an individual "chase" called the Cash Builder, in which they attempted to answer as many questions as possible in 60 seconds to earn as much money as possible to contribute to a prize fund for the team. The contestant then had to answer enough questions to stay ahead of the chaser in a head-to-head competition scored on a game board; otherwise, they lost their winnings and were eliminated. The contestants who successfully completed their individual chases without being caught advanced to the Final Chase, in which they answered questions as a team playing for an equal share of the prize fund accumulated throughout the episode.

The Chase received positive critical reception; Burns and Labbett earned positive reviews for their roles, and one critic praised the series for avoiding a slow pace in gameplay. Both the series and Burns received Daytime Emmy Award nominations; the series was nominated in 2014 for Outstanding Game Show, and Burns two years later for Outstanding Game Show Host. Each lost, to Jeopardy! and Craig Ferguson (host of Celebrity Name Game) respectively.

== Gameplay ==
=== Cash Builder and individual chases ===
Screenshot from the GSN version illustrating how an individual chase appears on-screen. The contestant has selected the higher $90,000 offer and is thus six correct answers away from banking the money, with a two-step head start on the chaser, represented by the red arrow.

Three new contestants participate in each episode. Each contestant attempts to win money for their team by answering as many questions correctly as possible during a one-minute "Cash Builder" round, earning money per correct answer ($5,000 on the GSN version, $25,000 in the first season of the ABC version, and $10,000 in the second and third seasons). (During GSN celebrity episodes where contestants play for an elected charity, each contestant is credited the value of one correct answer at the outset.)

After the Cash Builder, the contestant participates in a head-to-head "chase" against the chaser. Both sides answer a series of questions, with the contestant attempting to move the money down a game board and into the team bank without being caught. The contestant and chaser stand at opposite ends of the board, which has seven spaces, and the contestant chooses a starting position. They may begin three steps ahead of the chaser, requiring five correct answers and play for the money earned in the Cash Builder. Alternatively, they may accept one of two offers from the chaser: either start one step closer to the chaser and play for a higher amount or start one step farther away and play for a lower amount. The lower offer can be zero or even negative, depending on the result of the Cash Builder. On occasion, a contestant is presented with a "Super Offer" to play for even higher stakes with a head start of only one step.

Once the contestant chooses a starting position, the host asks a series of questions with three answer options, and the contestant and chaser secretly lock in their answers on keypads. After either side locks in a choice, the other must do the same within five seconds or be locked out for that turn. A correct answer by either side moves them one space down the board and toward the bank, while a miss or lockout leaves them where they are. If the contestant successfully moves the money into the bank, they advance to the Final Chase and their money is added to the team bank; if the chaser catches up, the contestant is eliminated and their money is forfeited.

If all three contestants fail to win their individual chases, the team selects one contestant to play the Final Chase alone for a dollar amount divided evenly among the team ($15,000 on the GSN version, an amount offered by the chaser in the first season of the ABC version, and $60,000 in the third season). During GSN celebrity episodes, contestants who are caught leave with $5,000 for their respective charities.

=== The Final Chase ===
The team randomly chooses one of two question sets for themselves, with the other set put aside for the chaser, and have two minutes to give as many correct answers as possible. Contestants must respond as soon as they are called on and must ring in before they can either respond or pass a question. Any answer given by a contestant who has not rung in is considered incorrect. Ringing in is not required if only one contestant is playing the Final Chase. Every correct answer moves the team one step ahead on the game board and they are given a head start of one step per team member participating in the round. Team members may not discuss or confer on any questions during this portion. If all three team members lose their respective individual chases, they choose one member to play the Final Chase alone (on behalf of the whole team, with a one-step head start). On the first season of the ABC version, this player did not receive a head start.

After the contestants have completed their Final Chase, the chaser then has two minutes to catch the team by answering questions from the unused set in the same manner. If the chaser passes or misses a question, the clock briefly stops and the team is given a chance to discuss it and offer an answer. A correct response pushes the chaser back one step, or moves the team ahead by one if the chaser is still at the starting line. If the chaser fails to catch the team before time runs out, the participating members receive equal shares of the bank; otherwise, they leave with nothing. During celebrity episodes, if the chaser catches the team before time runs out, all three members receive $5,000 each.

== Chasers ==
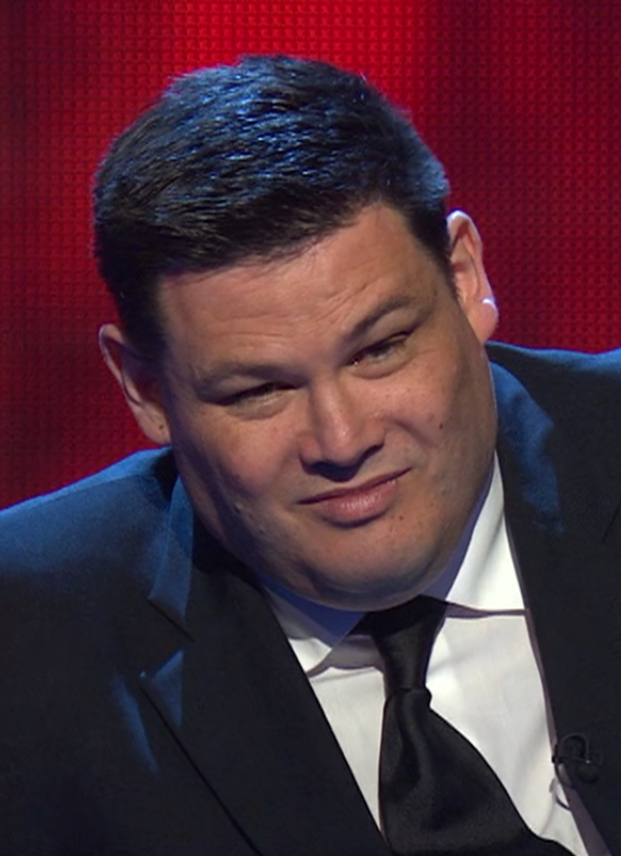
Mark Labbett served as the GSN version's only chaser and joined the ABC version in its second season.

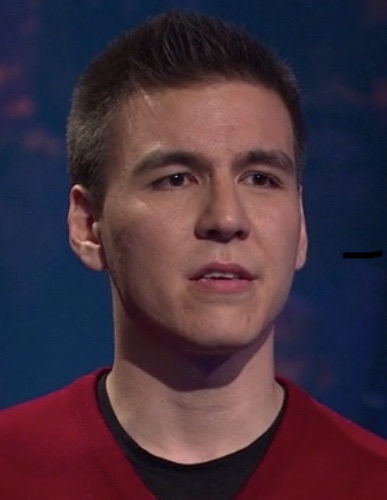
James Holzhauer appeared as a contestant on a GSN episode before becoming a chaser on the ABC version.

- Mark Labbett (2013–15; 2021–22): Labbett appeared on British quiz shows University Challenge, Fifteen to One, The Syndicate and Who Wants to Be a Millionaire? He was the runner-up on The People's Quiz, the runner-up on Brain of Britain, and part of a winning team on Only Connect. Labbett was one of the original chasers on the British version of the show, appearing in every season since its inception, as well as being one of six on the Australian version of the show. He was the sole chaser on the show when it initially aired in 2013 on Game Show Network, and was joined by Holzhauer, Jennings and Rutter when it was rebooted on ABC. Labbett confirmed in February 2022 that his contract had not been renewed for the show's third season. He is nicknamed "the Beast" and "the Transatlantic Giant".
- James Holzhauer (2021–23): Holzhauer is a 32-episode champion on Jeopardy! and the winner of the 2019 Jeopardy! Tournament of Champions. He holds the record for highest winnings on a single Jeopardy! episode and is also a former contestant on GSN's version of The Chase, winning $58,333 as part of a three-person team. Holzhauer is the third highest-earning American game show contestant of all time. He is nicknamed "the High Roller".
- Ken Jennings (2021–22): Jennings is the record holder for the longest winning streak on Jeopardy!, with 74 wins. He is the winner of the Jeopardy! The Greatest of All Time tournament. He also appeared on Are You Smarter than a 5th Grader?, Grand Slam, Who Wants to Be a Millionaire, and 1 vs. 100. Many consider Jennings the greatest quiz show contestant of all time, and he is the highest-earning quiz show contestant in U.S. history. He is nicknamed "the Professor".
- Brad Rutter (2021–23): Rutter is the second-highest earning quiz show contestant in the U.S. and the highest earner in Jeopardy! history, winning over $5 million. Rutter never lost an episode during regular Jeopardy! game play. His only loss was during the Greatest of All Time tournament, in which he finished third. Rutter also appeared on Million Dollar Mindgame, winning $600,000 between six contestants collectively. He is nicknamed "the Buzzsaw".
- Victoria Groce (2022–23): Groce is best known for ending the 19-day winning streak of Jeopardy! player David Madden. In other quizzing endeavors, she has won multiple academic competitions and placed within the top ten at the annual World Quiz Championships in multiple years. She is nicknamed "the Queen".
- Brandon Blackwell (2022–23): Blackwell participated on Jeopardy!, Who Wants to Be a Millionaire, The Million Second Quiz, and the British quiz show University Challenge. He is nicknamed "the Lightning Bolt".
- Buzzy Cohen (2022–23): Dubbed "Mr. Personality" by Alex Trebek, Cohen is an AAU National Champion, the winner of the 2017 Jeopardy Tournament of Champions, and a captain for the Jeopardy! All Star Games. He is nicknamed "the Stunner".

== Production ==
=== GSN (2013–2015) ===
Logo used for the GSN version

The Chase originated in the United Kingdom, premiering on ITV in 2009. As the series became increasingly popular in the UK, Fox ordered two pilot episodes in April 2012 to be taped in London for consideration to be added to the network's American programming lineup. Bradley Walsh, presenter of the British version, was featured as the show's host, while UK chaser Mark "the Beast" Labbett and Jeopardy! champion Brad Rutter were the chasers.

After Fox passed up the opportunity to add the series to its lineup, Game Show Network (GSN), in conjunction with ITV Studios America, picked up the series with an eight-episode order on April 9, 2013, and announced Brooke Burns as the show's host and Labbett as the chaser on May 29, 2013. Dan Patrick had originally been considered as the host.

The first season premiered on August 6, 2013. Even though the show had not yet premiered at the time, the network ordered a second season of eight episodes on July 1, 2013, which premiered on November 5, 2013. Citing the series' status as a "ratings phenom,” GSN eventually announced plans to renew it for a third season, which premiered in the summer of 2014.

During the third season, the series also premiered its first celebrity edition with celebrity contestants playing for charity. GSN proceeded to renew the series for a fourth season before the end of season three; this new season began airing on January 27, 2015. After the seventh episode of the season, the series went on another hiatus; new episodes from the fourth season resumed airing on July 16, 2015. The final episode of the fourth season aired on December 11, 2015, concluding the show's original run after four seasons and 51 episodes. Episodes from the first two seasons are available on Netflix.

=== ABC (2021–2023) ===
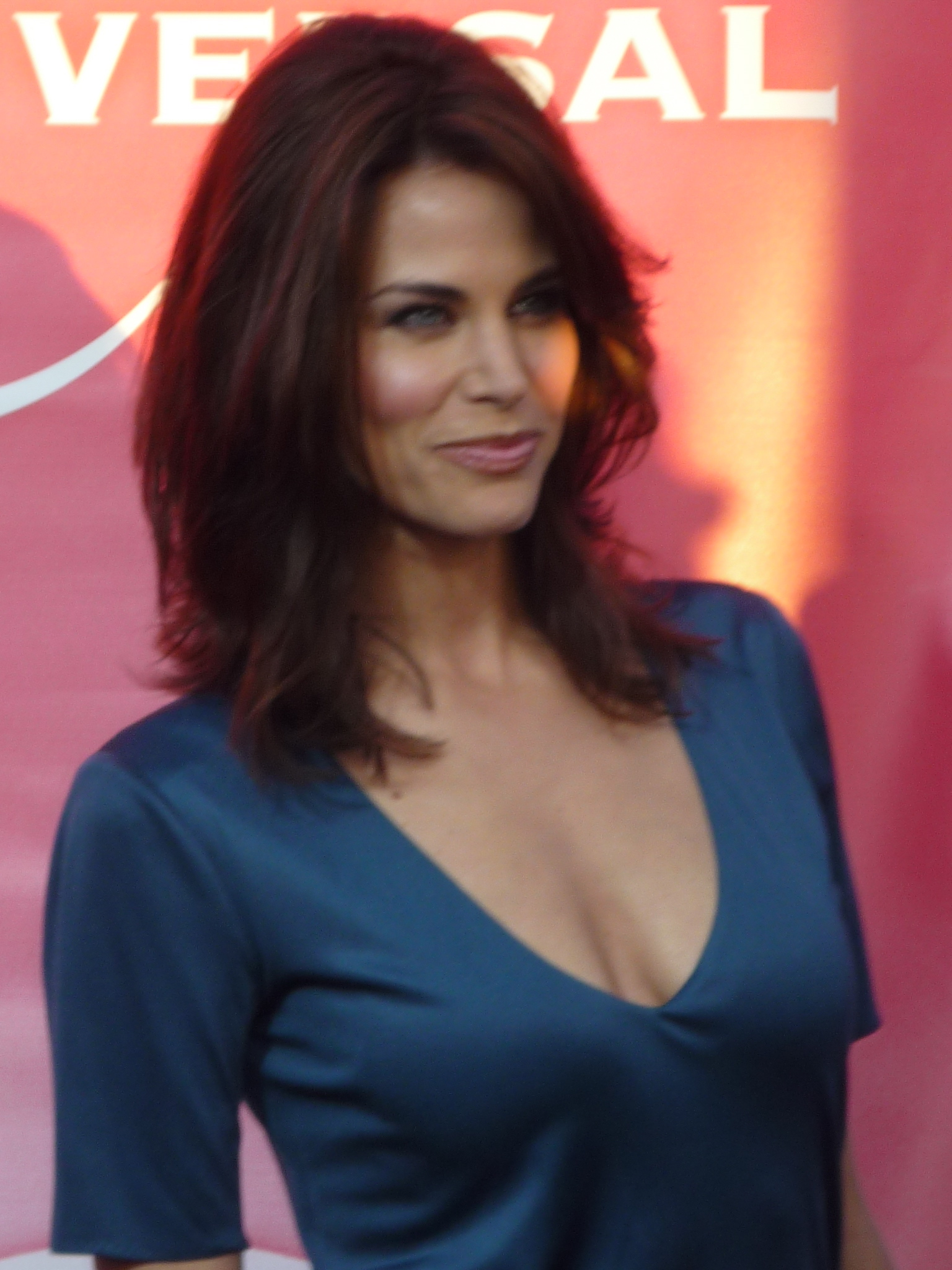
Brooke Burns hosted the GSN version from 2013–15.

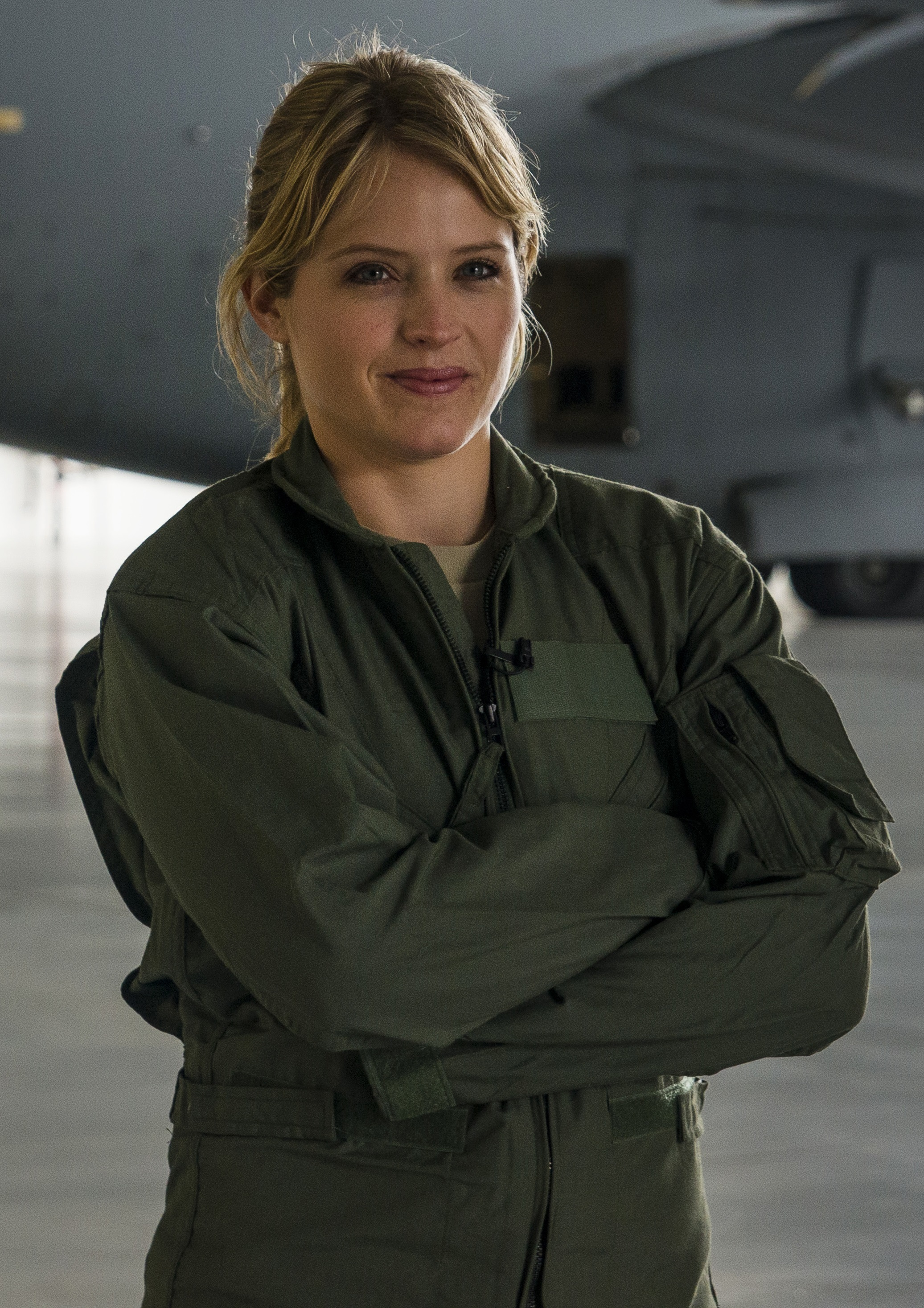
Sara Haines hosted all three seasons of the ABC revival.

On July 20, 2020, it was reported that ABC was casting for an American revival of The Chase. Three days later, Deadline Hollywood reported that the network was in talks to cast Rutter and fellow Jeopardy! champions Ken Jennings and James Holzhauer to serve as the chasers. Holzhauer, Jennings and Rutter had recently competed on Jeopardy! The Greatest of All Time, a primetime Jeopardy! tournament aired on ABC in January, while Holzhauer was also a previous contestant on the GSN version, which led to him appearing on Jeopardy! in 2019. On November 2, 2020, it was reported that ABC had ordered The Chase to series for a nine-episode run, with Sara Haines of ABC's daytime talk show The View as host and Jennings, Holzhauer and Rutter each rotating as the Chaser. On the show, Jennings is nicknamed "The Professor," Holzhauer as "The High Roller" and Rutter as "The Buzzsaw". The revival premiered on January 7, 2021. The season premiere was dedicated to Alex Trebek, who died on November 8, 2020, at the age of 80, and hosted Jeopardy! when Jennings, Holzhauer and Rutter were contestants.

On April 7, 2021, the revival was renewed for a second season, which premiered on June 6, 2021. In May 2021, it was reported that Labbett would be rejoining the American version of the series as the ABC version's fourth chaser. The second half of the second season premiered on January 5, 2022.

On March 15, 2022, the revival was confirmed for a third season, featuring Victoria Groce, Brandon Blackwell (a member of the University Challenge 2019–20 championship team), and Buzzy Cohen as new chasers, alongside returning chasers Rutter and Holzhauer. It premiered on May 3, 2022. The second half of the third season premiered on January 5, 2023, and resumed on June 29, 2023. No new episodes have aired since July 20, 2023.

== Reception ==
=== Critical reception ===
The Chase was generally well received by critics. Michael Tyminski of Manhattan Digest reviewed the series positively, calling it "a breath of fresh air" and praising Burns and Labbett in their respective roles. Tyminski added that while each question's level of difficulty is not always on par with those on other quiz shows such as Jeopardy!, the show avoids a "painfully slow pace." Similarly, John Teti of The A.V. Club called the show a "pretty good adaptation" of its UK counterpart. While he preferred the British version of the show, saying that it had "a more varied cast and stronger production values,” Teti felt that the American version "still holds its own." The Chase was also ranked ninth on Douglas Pucci's (of TV Media Insights) list of best new television shows of 2013.

The Chase was one of two GSN originals (the other being The American Bible Challenge) to be honored at the 41st Daytime Emmy Awards in 2014 with an Emmy nomination for Outstanding Game Show, Jeopardy! was the eventual winner. Two years later, Burns received an Emmy nomination at the 43rd Daytime Emmy Awards for Outstanding Game Show Host, losing to Craig Ferguson of Celebrity Name Game.

Writing for Decider, Joel Keller stated that the ABC version "could be slightly faster-paced, but the excitement of people going head-to-head with three of the best quiz show contestants in American television history is something game show aficionados can really sink their teeth into." Linda Maleh of TV Insider was critical of some elements of the revival, but still noted, "A chance to face off with some of the most well known trivia buffs is a good premise for a game show, it just needs to cut the fat."

On April 14, 2024, The Chase won the Writers Guild of America Award for Quiz and Audience Participation.

=== Ratings ===
The Chase became one of the highest-rated original programs in GSN's history. The series debuted to 511,000 total viewers during its premiere while maintaining 90% of its audience with 461,000 total viewers during the second episode airing that night. On January 28, 2014, The Chase set a new series high for total viewers and adults 18–49, with 827,000 and 234,000 viewers, respectively. Although the season three premiere fell in the ratings from its series high, earning 494,000 viewers with only 73,000 in the 18–49 demographic, the premiere of the fourth season saw a sizeable rise over the previous season's premiere, earning 749,000 total viewers. With a strong lead-in from Celebrity Wheel of Fortune, the 2021 ABC version premiered to a 0.9/5 rating/share and 6.2 million viewers. The second season of the 2021 version premiered to 4.07 million viewers. The third season of the 2021 version premiered to 2.29 million viewers.

== Mobile versions ==
On December 18, 2013, Barnstorm Games released a mobile version of the game for iOS and Android. The only differences between the app and the show are that four choices are presented for questions in the Cash Builder and Final Chase rounds and that no Final Chase is played if all players are caught in their individual chases. The app features Labbett (referred to by his "Beast" nickname) as a simulated chaser and can be played by up to four people. The game was removed from the App Store and Google Play in 2021.

On November 6, 2023, nearly ten years after the previous mobile version was released, Barnstorm Games released a new, updated mobile game for iOS, titled "The Chase: World Tour". The game features American, British, and Australian chasers. Players are able to unlock new cities and chasers as they progress through the game.
