= 500 Questions =

American game show (2015–2016)

- Genre: Game show
- Created by: Mark Burnett; Mike Darnell
- Directed by: Don Weiner
- Presented by: Richard Quest; Dan Harris
- Music by: Burnett Music Group
- Country of origin: United States
- Original language: English
- No. of seasons: 2
- No. of episodes: 12

Production
- Executive producers: Mark Burnett; Mike Darnell; Phil Parsons
- Producers: Laura Roush; Felipe Castillo; Scott Saltzburg
- Production locations: Universal Studios, Universal City, California
- Editors: Pierre Dwyer; Lane Farnham; Victor Gonzaga
- Running time: 45−90 minutes
- Production companies: United Artists Media Group (season 1); MGM Television (season 2); Warner Horizon Television

Original release
- Network: ABC
- Release: May 20, 2015 – June 1, 2016

500 Questions is an American game show broadcast on ABC. The show premiered on Wednesday, May 20, 2015, at 8:00 pm EDT, and ran for seven straight weeknights, with a weekend break. The show features contestants who try to answer 500 questions without getting three questions wrong in a row. The series was renewed for a second season on October 1, 2015.

CNN journalist Richard Quest hosted the show's first season. Good Morning America weekend co-anchor and Nightline anchor Dan Harris hosted the show's second season.

The second season premiered on May 26, 2016, and consisted of five episodes aired over a seven-night period; the series aired its last episode on June 1, 2016.

== Gameplay ==
=== Season 1 ===
Each contestant's run is divided into ten rounds of 50 questions each. Each round has ten categories (one of which is always "Random", consisting of general knowledge questions) with five questions each. The contestant can choose a question from the categories in any order. Whenever the contestant answers a question correctly, the correctly answered question is highlighted silver within its category. Answering a question incorrectly results in a "wrong", with three wrong answers in a row eliminating the contestant. Also, whenever the contestant incorrectly answers a question, it is highlighted in red under its category. However, answering any question correctly will erase any wrongs the contestant has accumulated.

Standing across from the contestant is the challenger. The challenger will also occasionally answer questions per the question descriptions below. In addition, if the contestant has accumulated two wrong answers, the challenger chooses the contestant's next category in hopes of knocking out the contestant. Successfully doing so results in the challenger taking the contestant's spot, and starting their own journey towards 500 questions. If a challenger fails to eliminate a contestant in a round (i.e., within 50 questions), then the challenger is eliminated and a new challenger takes over. This is the only means by which the challenger can be eliminated.

If the contestant completes a board of 50 questions, the money won on that board is guaranteed. However, any wrongs that a contestant may have at the end of a round carry over into the next round. If a contestant is eliminated, only money banked in previous rounds is awarded; all money in the current round is lost. The exception is the "milestone", which occurred on the 25th question of a round. If the contestant answered the question correctly on the first response, the contestant received a guaranteed $5,000, separate from the bank (in addition to earning the standard award for the question). There are no bonuses for completing individual categories or rounds.

There are four types of questions, which are randomly distributed throughout the board. The type remains unknown until the question is selected.

- Regular questions: The contestant must correctly answer the question within a ten-second time limit. Multiple guesses are allowed, but the contestant only earns $1,000 for the question if the first response given is correct. Not providing a correct answer to the question within ten seconds results in a wrong.
- Battle questions: The contestant and challenger face off, going back and forth giving answers to a question with a limited number of correct answers. Before the question is revealed, the contestant chooses whether to go first or second based solely on the category. Only five seconds are allotted per response, and only the first answer is accepted. If the challenger gives an incorrect response or runs out of time, the battle ends and it counts as a correct answer for the contestant, who earns $1,000. An incorrect response or exceeding the time limit from the contestant counts as a wrong answer. If all correct responses are given, the battle ends in a draw, the contestant does not earn $1,000, does not get a wrong, and does not have any accumulated wrongs eliminated.
- Top Ten Challenge questions: The contestant had to provide five out of ten possible correct answers (incorrect guesses are allowed) within a fifteen-second time limit. Doing so earned $1,000, but if the contestant ran out of time, it counted as a wrong. Before the question was revealed, the contestant had the option to pass this question to the challenger. If the challenger succeeded, the contestant received a wrong; however, if the challenger failed, the contestant earned $1,000.
- Triple Threat questions: Triple Threat questions have three correct answers. The contestant had to provide all three correct answers (incorrect guesses are allowed) within a ten-second time limit to earn $3,000. Running out of time resulted in a wrong.

=== Season 2 ===
The game play between season 1 and season 2 remains the same, except for the following rule changes:

- Contestants now have five seconds rather than ten for each response. However, on standard questions, contestants now receive $1,000 if they give the correct answer at any point before time expires.
- The ten categories on each board have three questions each instead of five, so challengers have 30 questions in which to eliminate the champion. "Random" is no longer a category.
- Triple Threat and Top Ten question types have been eliminated, but there are now six Battle questions for each set of 30. (Contestants can ask for how many battles are left at any point.)
- Milestone questions have been eliminated.
- Lightning Round: Contestants who successfully complete a board of 30 questions play a lightning round before facing a new challenger. Contestants have two minutes to answer as many questions as time permits, with only one guess permitted per question. As in the main game, an incorrect answer earns a wrong; a right answer clears any wrongs, while a third consecutive wrong ends the round immediately (but does not eliminate the contestant). Each answer given during the round—right or wrong—advances their question count by one towards the goal of 500 questions. Each correct answer earns $1,000 to their already banked total (the amount guaranteed to the contestant). Correct answers in the Lightning Round do not clear main game wrongs, while wrongs from the lightning round do not carry over to the main game.
- With all bonuses removed from the question rounds, the top prize for a contestant is $500,000 (that is if they answer all 500 questions correctly).

=== Goal ===
While the stated goal of the show is to survive 500 questions, it was never stated on the show what would happen if that milestone was reached. ABC, MGM Television, and Warner Horizon Television have not confirmed if there are any additional bonuses for doing so; moreover, fewer than 500 questions were asked in each season.

== Contestants ==
=== Season 1 ===
- Dan McCarthy
  - Eliminated on question 57 by Steve Bahnaman (episode 102), winning $35,000
  - Defeated Ogi Ogas (episode 102)
- Steve Bahnaman
  - Eliminated on question 168 by Adam Villani (episode 105), winning $110,000
  - Defeated Jonathan Corbblah (episode 102), James Holzhauer (episode 103), Megan Barnes (episode 105)
- Adam Villani
  - Eliminated on question 146 by Richard Mason (episode 107), winning $80,000
  - Defeated Pam Mueller (episode 106), Mehrun Etebari (episode 107)
- Richard Mason
  - Entered competition in episode 107; did not participate in season 2
  - Faced no challengers before the expiry of time in the season

=== Season 2 ===
- Ken Jennings
  - Eliminated on question 4 by Monica Thieu (episode 201)
- Monica Thieu
  - Eliminated on question 53 by Nathan Kaplan, winning $28,000
  - Defeated Brandon Saunders (episode 201)
- Nathan Kaplan
  - Eliminated on question 24 by Ryan Chaffee (episode 201)
- Ryan Chaffee
  - Eliminated on question 51 by Liz Murphy (episode 202), winning $36,000
  - Defeated Terry Linwood (episode 202)
- Liz Murphy
  - Eliminated on question 22 by William Lee (episode 203)
- William Lee
  - Eliminated on question 72 by Guy Jordan (episode 204), winning $35,000.
  - Defeated Colby Burnett (episode 203)
- Guy Jordan
  - Ended second season answering 241 questions, winning $169,000
  - Defeated Stephanie "Muffy" Marracco (episode 204), Steve Wong (episode 204), Brandon Alexander (episode 205), Raj Dhuwalia (episode 205), Claudia Perry (episode 205).

== Episodes ==
=== Season 1 (2015) ===
The two Thursday-night episodes (2 and 7) were two hours in length.

| No. | Title | Original release date | US viewers (millions) |
|---|---|---|---|
| 1 | "Series Premiere: Night 1" | May 20, 2015 | 5.06 |
| 2 | "Night 2" | May 21, 2015 | 4.61 |
| 3 | "Night 3" | May 22, 2015 | 4.03 |
| 4 | "Night 4" | May 25, 2015 | 5.23 |
| 5 | "Night 5" | May 26, 2015 | 4.70 |
| 6 | "Night 6" | May 27, 2015 | 4.90 |
| 7 | "Season Finale: Night 7" | May 28, 2015 | 5.03 |

=== Season 2 (2016) ===
Episodes 1, 4 and 5 are two hours in length.

| No. | Title | Original release date | US viewers (millions) |
|---|---|---|---|
| 1 | "Season Premiere: Night 1" | May 26, 2016 | 5.06 |
| 2 | "Night 2" | May 27, 2016 | 4.44 |
| 3 | "Night 3" | May 28, 2016 | 2.69 |
| 4 | "Night 4" | May 31, 2016 | 3.84 |
| 5 | "Season Finale: Night 5" | June 1, 2016 | 4.51 |

== International versions ==
In Germany, RTL Television commissioned a local version to air in Germany in 2016 called 500 - Die Quiz-Arena (500 - The Quiz Arena) and hosted by German Who Wants to Be a Millionaire host Günther Jauch. Answering all 500 questions will bring the total prize up to €2,500,000, which has yet to receive in the first series of five 90-minute episodes.

After, on November 27, 2015, Wall to Wall Media picked up the rights to air the English version of the show on ITV. It began airing on August 22, 2016, with Giles Coren as the host. The format was somewhat different from the U.S. version. Four episodes were produced, each offering 10 categories with five questions per category. Each question had to be answered within five seconds, and correct answers added £500 to the day's jackpot; if the contestant missed three questions in a row, they were eliminated with no winnings and a backup contestant took their place. Whenever the contestant had two consecutive misses, the backup chose the next category in an attempt to force them out of the game. After all 50 questions had been asked, the contestant in control of the game won the entire jackpot (a maximum of £25,000 if all questions were answered correctly) and the right to start the next episode.

This format included three special question types, which were randomly hidden on the category board. "Triple Threat" questions had three or more correct answers, and the contestant had 10 seconds to give three of them. "Battle" questions also had multiple answers, and the contestant and backup took turns giving one each; as soon as either participant missed, their opponent won. The "Lightning Round" consisted of 10 rapid-fire questions, each worth £500; the first question was in the chosen category, but the other nine were drawn at random. If a contestant accrued their third consecutive miss during a Lightning Round, the backup had to play the rest of it.

| Country | Name | Presenter | Channel | Date of transmission |
|---|---|---|---|---|
| Germany | 500 - Die Quiz-Arena | Günther Jauch | RTL | July 4, 2016 – August 14, 2017 |
| Hungary | 500 — Az ország géniusza | Egon Rónai | ATV | March 4, 2019 – March 11, 2019 |
| United Kingdom | 500 Questions | Giles Coren | ITV | August 22, 2016 – August 25, 2016 |
