= Brandon Blackwell =

American quizzer (born 1993/1994)

- Born: 1993/1994 (age 32–33); Queens, New York, U.S.
- Other names: "Imperial Brandon" "The Lightning Bolt"
- Education: New York University; Imperial College London
- Occupation: Quiz show contestant and personality

Brandon Blackwell (born 1993/1994) is an American quiz player and television personality. A native of Queens, New York City, he won the 2019–20 edition of University Challenge as a student at Imperial College London. He was one of the "chasers" on the American version of The Chase from 2022 to 2023, and the Australian version in 2024.

== Life and career ==
Blackwell was born in the New York borough of Queens. His mother teaches middle school, and his father is an insurance adjuster. He went to a gifted elementary school on Long Island and attended the Bronx High School of Science. He earned his undergraduate degree in computer science from New York University. By age 20, he had won about US$400,000 from quiz shows, including the Jeopardy! Teen Tournament (US$10,000), Who Wants to Be a Millionaire (US$43,100), and The Million Second Quiz (runner-up) in 2013.

By 2016, Blackwell saw London as "the epicenter" of high-level quizzing and sought to win University Challenge, a television quiz show featuring UK college students. He was accepted into Imperial College London for a computer science master's program. He intensely taught himself British history using Wikipedia, flash cards, and old episodes of University Challenge. He briefly left Imperial because he felt the school's selection process for University Challenge did not produce a team well rounded enough to compete seriously.

Blackwell then returned to Imperial and rejoined the quiz team alongside Richard Brooks, Conor McMeel, and captain Caleb Rich for University Challenge 2019–20. The group practiced once a week for three months; Blackwell suggested a rule that a subject specialist defer to his teammates to float the first guess. They dominated the tournament winning all their games, and all but one of their episodes by a margin of at least 150 points. Blackwell, introduced on the show as "Imperial Brandon", attracted attention for his depth of knowledge and his charismatic personality.

Blackwell appeared as a "chaser" (alias "the Lightning Bolt") on The Chase (US) in 2022-23 and as a guest on The Chase Australia in 2024.

Blackwell has represented the United States in several quizzing tournaments. He won the national team event at the 2023 International Quizzing Championships in Torremolinos, Spain, as part of the United States national team which included his fellow chaser Victoria Groce.

== Personal life ==
As of 2020, Blackwell lives in the neighborhood of Jamaica, Queens.
