= Peter MacGregor-Scott =

English film producer

Peter MacGregor-Scott (December 28, 1947 – October 29, 2017) was a British film producer, production manager and assistant director. He is best known for producing Batman Forever, Batman & Robin and the Batman OnStar commercials. He also produced the Cheech & Chong films Cheech & Chong's The Corsican Brothers, Still Smokin and Born in East L.A.. Others are The Whoopee Boys and Death to Smoochy.

== Early life ==
Peter MacGregor-Scott was born in Maidenhead, England. His father was J. C. MacGregor Scott, who served as an executive with such British film companies as Columbia Pictures U.K., Warner-Pathe Distributors and Commonwealth United International.

== Career ==
MacGregor-Scott was a film producer since the 1970s. He started off working for ABPC Elstree Studios in the sound department.

His earliest work includes Perfect Friday in which he was second unit director or assistant director. In 1970, he left England to move to the United States. In that year he worked on Ride the Tiger which was shot in the Philippines.

In 1971, he worked on The Day of the Wolves and in 1976 in High Velocity. He co-produced The Fugitive. From the mid-90's to the turn of the millennium he purveyed over the Batman franchise, producing Batman Forever, Batman & Robin and the Batman OnStar commercials.

It was announced that on October 5, 2013, he was to present the MPEG Fellowship and Service Award to re-recording mixer Donald O. Mitchell. Both MacGregor-Scott and Mitchell had worked together on Under Siege and Batman & Robin.

== Death ==
MacGregor-Scott was involved in a taxi accident in New York City which resulted in complications which would lead to his death on October 25, 2017, aged 69.
