= The Answer Is... =

2020 memoir

The Answer Is …: Reflections on My Life
- Author: Alex Trebek
- Language: English
- Genre: non-fiction
- Publisher: Simon & Schuster
- Publication date: July 21, 2020
- Publication place: United States
- Pages: 287

The Answer Is...: Reflections on My Life is a 2020 memoir by Alex Trebek. The long-time Jeopardy! host recounts his life and relationships, as well as his work in television. Three and a half months after the book's release, Trebek died after a 20-month battle with stage IV pancreatic cancer.

The audiobook was mostly narrated by Ken Jennings, who was named interim host on October 29, 2020. Jennings taped seven days (seven weeks) worth of episodes starting on November 30, 2020; a foreword was read by Trebek. (Jennings served as successor Mayim Bialik's substitute from 2021 to 2023, and was named permanent full-time host on December 15, 2023.) It was nominated for the Grammy Award for Best Spoken Word Album at the 63rd Grammy Awards, losing to Rachel Maddow's Blowout.
