= Andrew Pau =

Andrew Pau is an associate professor of music theory at Oberlin Conservatory. Focusing primarily on music of 19th-century French composers, he has presented work on text setting, chromatic harmony, and phrase rhythm in addition to theories of musical meaning and narrative.

In April 2016, Pau was a contestant on the game show Jeopardy!, winning six games and $172,202. In the 2017 Tournament of Champions, he won his quarterfinal game and finished second in his semifinal game behind Austin Rogers, taking home a consolation prize of $10,000.

== Education ==
- BA, Stanford University, 1990
- JD, Harvard Law School, 1993
- MM, Mannes College of Music, 2005
- PhD, Graduate Center of the City University of New York, 2012
