= University Challenge 2019–20 =

British television quiz programme

Series 49 of University Challenge began on 15 July 2019 on BBC Two.

The University of Huddersfield made its University Challenge debut in this series, while the Oxford colleges Wolfson and Lady Margaret Hall made their first appearances in the BBC series.

== Results ==
- Winning teams are highlighted in **bold**.
- Teams with green scores (winners) returned in the next round, while those with red scores (losers) were eliminated.
- Teams with orange scores had to win one more match to return in the next round.
- Teams with yellow scores indicate that two further matches had to be played and won (teams that lost their first quarter-final match).
- A score in italics indicates a match decided on a tie-breaker question.

=== First round ===
Team 1	Score		Team 2	Total	Broadcast date
Lancaster University	95	230	**University of Glasgow**	325	15 July 2019
**Corpus Christi College, Cambridge**	195	140	Merton College, Oxford	335	22 July 2019
**Magdalen College, Oxford**	170	150	University of York	320	29 July 2019
**University of Birmingham**	125	120	University of Bristol	245	5 August 2019
Wolfson College, Cambridge	40	115	**St John's College, Oxford**	155	12 August 2019
**University of Edinburgh**	165	90	Birkbeck, University of London	255	19 August 2019
Jesus College, Oxford	145	185	**University of Manchester**	330	2 September 2019
Durham University	145	200	**Trinity College, Cambridge**	345	9 September 2019
London School of Economics	90	145	**The Courtauld Institute of Art**	235	16 September 2019
Goldsmiths, University of London	95	175	**University of Southampton**	270	23 September 2019
The Open University	125	145	**University of Huddersfield**	270	7 October 2019
**Wolfson College, Oxford**	180	170	University of Sheffield	350	14 October 2019
**Imperial College London**	255	70	Brasenose College, Oxford	325	21 October 2019
**Lady Margaret Hall, Oxford**	150	145	Downing College, Cambridge	295	28 October 2019

- Three teams finished tied for the last two places in the play-offs on 145 each; Durham and Jesus College Oxford went through due to having heard fewer questions to reach their scores.

==== Highest scoring losers play-offs ====
Team 1	Score		Team 2	Total	Broadcast date
University of Sheffield	165	170	**Jesus College, Oxford**	335	4 November 2019
University of York	145	240	**Durham University**	385	11 November 2019

=== Second round ===
Team 1	Score		Team 2	Total	Broadcast date
University of Birmingham	120	150	**Jesus College, Oxford**	270	18 November 2019
University of Southampton	95	245	**Durham University**	340	25 November 2019
**The Courtauld Institute of Art**	180	145	University of Glasgow	325	2 December 2019
**Imperial College London**	255	105	St John's College, Oxford	360	9 December 2019
University of Huddersfield	90	205	**University of Manchester**	295	16 December 2019
**Trinity College, Cambridge**	245	100	Lady Margaret Hall, Oxford	345	6 January 2020
**Wolfson College, Oxford**	220	100	University of Edinburgh	320	13 January 2020
Magdalen College, Oxford	75	270	**Corpus Christi College, Cambridge**	345	20 January 2020

=== Quarterfinals ===
Team 1	Score		Team 2	Total	Broadcast date
University of Manchester	95	300	**Trinity College, Cambridge**	395	27 January 2020
Wolfson College, Oxford	140	180	**Corpus Christi College, Cambridge**	320	3 February 2020
Jesus College, Oxford	110	195	**Durham University**	305	10 February 2020
The Courtauld Institute of Art	75	240	**Imperial College London**	315	17 February 2020
Trinity College, Cambridge	80	245	**Corpus Christi College, Cambridge**	325	24 February 2020
University of Manchester	125	130	**Wolfson College, Oxford**	255	2 March 2020
Durham University	115	185	**Imperial College London**	300	9 March 2020
**Jesus College, Oxford**	135	90	The Courtauld Institute of Art	225	16 March 2020
Wolfson College, Oxford	45	205	**Durham University**	250	23 March 2020
**Trinity College, Cambridge**	285	75	Jesus College, Oxford	360	30 March 2020

=== Semifinals ===
Team 1	Score		Team 2	Total	Broadcast date
**Corpus Christi College, Cambridge**	185	130	Durham University	315	6 April 2020
**Imperial College London**	235	80	Trinity College, Cambridge	315	13 April 2020

=== Final ===
Team 1	Score		Team 2	Total	Broadcast date
Corpus Christi College, Cambridge	105	275	**Imperial College London**	380	20 April 2020

- The trophy and title were awarded to the Imperial team of Richard Brooks, Brandon Blackwell, Caleb Rich, and Conor McMeel.
- The trophy was presented by Andrew Wiles, on location at the Oxford University Mathematics Institute.

== Spin-off: Christmas Special 2019 ==
=== First round ===
Each year, a Christmas special sequence is aired featuring distinguished alumni. Out of 7 first-round winners, the top 4 highest-scoring teams progress to the semi-finals. The teams consist of celebrities who represent their alma maters.

- Winning teams are highlighted in **bold**.
- Teams with green scores (winners) returned in the next round, while those with red scores (losers) were eliminated.
- Teams with grey scores won their match but did not achieve a high enough score to proceed to the next round.
- A score in italics indicates a match decided on a tie-breaker question.

Team 1			Team 2	Total	Broadcast date
**University of Leeds**	205	55	Clare College, Cambridge	260	23 December 2019
Birmingham City University	75	160	**Wadham College, Oxford**	235	24 December 2019
Guildhall School of Music and Drama	120	165	**University College London**	285	25 December 2019
University of Liverpool	75	150	**University of Hull**	225	26 December 2019
Royal Holloway, University of London	70	130	**University of Sussex**	200	27 December 2019
**Trinity Hall, Cambridge**	180	85	St Peter's College, Oxford	265	30 December 2019
University of Warwick	80	115	**Imperial College London**	195	31 December 2019

==== Standings for the winners ====
Rank	Team	Team captain	Score
1	University of Leeds	Richard Coles	205
2	Trinity Hall, Cambridge	Lucy Mangan	185
3	University College London	Maryam Moshiri	165
4	Wadham College, Oxford	Anne McElvoy	160
5	University of Hull	Lucy Beaumont	150
6	University of Sussex	Kim Newman	130
7	Imperial College London	Brendan Walker	115

=== Semi-finals ===
Team 1	Score		Team 2	Total	Broadcast date
Trinity Hall, Cambridge	25	215	**Wadham College, Oxford**	240	1 January 2020
**University of Leeds**	205	45	University College London	250	2 January 2020

=== Final ===
Team 1	Score		Team 2	Total	Broadcast date
Wadham College, Oxford	130	235	**University of Leeds**	365	3 January 2020

The winning University of Leeds team of Jonathan Clements, Henry Gee, Richard Coles and Timothy Allen beat the Wadham College, Oxford team of Jonathan Freedland, Tom Solomon, Anne McElvoy and Roger Mosey.
