= Ken Jennings =

American game show host (born 1974)

- Jennings in 2026
- Born: Kenneth Wayne Jennings III; May 23, 1974 (age 52); Edmonds, Washington, U.S.
- Education: Brigham Young University (BA)
- Occupations: Game show contestant; game show host; author; podcaster
- Years active: 2003–present
- Known for: Holding the record for all-time American game show winnings; Having the longest Jeopardy! winning streak; Hosting Jeopardy!, Celebrity Jeopardy!, and Jeopardy! Masters
- Spouse: Mindy Jennings (m. 2000)
- Children: 2
- Website: ken-jennings.com

Kenneth Wayne Jennings III (born May 23, 1974) is an American game show host and author who has hosted the syndicated quiz show Jeopardy! since 2021. He is best known for his success and streak as a contestant on the program: in 2004, he won 74 consecutive games, the longest streak in the show's history, and became the highest-earning American game show contestant up to that time. Before appearing on Jeopardy!, Jennings worked as a software engineer.

Afterward, Jennings pursued a career as an author, writing about his experience and exploring American trivia history and culture in a series of best-selling books. He also appeared on other game shows, including The Chase (where he was nicknamed "The Professor"), and hosted the Omnibus podcast from 2017 to 2025. Jennings returned to Jeopardy! in 2020 as a producer, and later guest-hosted the program after the death of host Alex Trebek that year. Jennings split full-time hosting duties with Mayim Bialik from 2021 to 2023, when he was made the sole host.

Jennings holds numerous game show records. As of 2025, he is the second-highest-earning American game show contestant, having won money on five different programs, including $4,522,700 on Jeopardy!. His original appearance on the program marks the longest winning streak on the show, netting him $2,522,700 over the course of his 75-day run. Despite his major success on Jeopardy!, Jennings does not hold the record for longest winning streak worldwide; that record is held by Ian Lygo, who won 75 games on the British game show 100% in 1998 (Jennings appeared on Jeopardy! for 75 days but won 74 games).

Jennings also holds the record for highest average correct responses per game and won the Jeopardy! The Greatest of All Time tournament. On July 30, 2025, he and Matt Damon became the second duo and the third celebrities overall to win the $1,000,000 top prize for their charity, Water.org, and the sixteenth overall million-dollar winners on Who Wants to Be a Millionaire. Jennings also won $100,000 on November 17, 2014.

== Early life ==
Jennings was born in Edmonds, Washington, just outside Seattle. His father was an international lawyer and moved the family to South Korea when Ken was in first grade. His mother was a schoolteacher and worked for the Department of Defense in that capacity overseas. Jennings grew up viewing Jeopardy! on the American Forces Network. He lived in Korea and Singapore for 11 years and graduated from the Seoul Foreign School.

Upon returning to the United States, Jennings attended the University of Washington. He is a member of the Church of Jesus Christ of Latter-day Saints and spent two years as a volunteer missionary in Madrid, Spain. In 1996, Jennings transferred to Brigham Young University (BYU). One of his roommates was author Brandon Sanderson. Jennings also played on the school's quizbowl team, at one point serving as captain, and graduated in 2000 with a double major in English and computer science. After college, he lived in Salt Lake City and was a software engineer for CHG Healthcare Services, a healthcare placement firm in Holladay, Utah.

== Career ==
=== Jeopardy! ===
==== Original streak ====
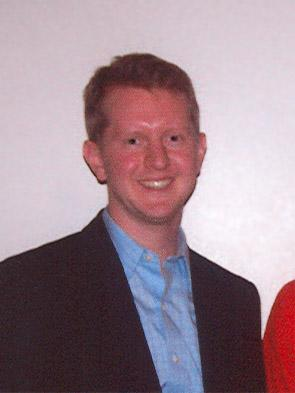
Jennings in 2005

Before 2003, Jeopardy! contestants were limited to five consecutive wins. At the beginning of the show's 20th season in 2003, the rules were changed to allow contestants to remain on the show as long as they continued to win. After this rule change, and until Jennings's run, the record winning streak was set by Tom Walsh, who won $186,900 in eight games in January 2004. Jennings took the contestant exam for Jeopardy! in 2003, but did not hear back from the show for a year. He was given three weeks to prepare for his taping. Jennings prepared extensively by using a couch as a lectern and his young child's toy as a buzzer while his wife used flashcards and kept score.

Jennings's run began during Jeopardy!'s 20th season with the episode airing on June 2, 2004, in which he unseated two-time champion Jerry Harvey, and continued into season 21. In his first episode, the Final Jeopardy! answer was, "She's the first female track and field athlete to win medals in five different events at a single Olympics." Jennings responded, "Who is Jones?", using only the last name of Marion Jones (who was not stripped of her medals until 2007). Host Alex Trebek said, "We will accept that; in terms of female athletes, there aren't that many."

His streak underway, Jennings taped 48 episodes before his first one aired. His last program was taped on September 7, 2004, and aired on November 30, coinciding with the end of the November sweeps. Jennings lost his 75th game to challenger Nancy Zerg. Jennings responded incorrectly to both Double Jeopardy! Daily Doubles, causing him to lose a combined $10,200 ($5,400 and $4,800, respectively) and leaving him with $14,400 at the end of the round. As a result, for only the 10th time in 75 games, Jennings did not have an insurmountable lead going into Final Jeopardy!. Only Jennings and Zerg, who ended Double Jeopardy! with $10,000, were able to play Final Jeopardy!, as third-place contestant David Hankins failed to finish with a positive score at the end of the Double Jeopardy! round. The Final Jeopardy! category was Business & Industry and the clue was, "Most of this firm's 70,000 seasonal white-collar employees work only four months a year." Jennings appeared perplexed during the time allowed to write a response, while Zerg finished her response quickly. Zerg responded correctly with "What is H&R Block?" and wagered $4,401 of her $10,000, giving her a $1 lead over Jennings with his response still to be revealed. Jennings responded, "What is FedEx?", losing with a final score of $8,799 after his $5,601 wager was deducted. After his response was revealed, the audience gasped and Zerg appeared shocked to have won. Jennings was awarded $2,000 for his second-place finish, giving him a total of $2,522,700 for his Jeopardy! run. Zerg, whom Jennings called a "formidable opponent", finished in third place on the next show. The audience gave both contestants a standing ovation and Trebek called Zerg a "giant killer" as Jennings embraced her. According to the Associated Press, rumors of Jennings's defeat began circulating shortly after the episode was taped, and footage had leaked online by November 29.

Overall, Jennings gave over 2,700 correct responses on the program. His run was interrupted by the off-season break (July to September), 2004 Kids' Week, the Tournament of Champions (September 20 to October 1), the 2004 United States presidential election (November 2, when no first-run episode was scheduled; the remaining episodes of the week aired from Wednesday to Saturday), and the College Championship (November 10 to 23). As a result, Jennings went five months without a loss. He did not participate in the Tournament of Champions, as invitations are extended to only those champions (four wins or more) who have been defeated, with the exception of the winner(s) of the College Championship. On December 1, the day after his defeat, Jennings made a guest appearance at the start of the broadcast, during which Trebek acknowledged his success and enumerated the various game show records he had broken.

==== Impact and television ratings ====
Jennings's 75 episodes were broadcast over 182 calendar days, and his run brought significant media attention and television ratings. According to the Nielsen TV National People Meter, Jeopardy!'s ratings were 22% higher during Jennings's run than during the same period in 2003. For several weeks of the streak, Jeopardy! was TV's highest-rated syndicated program, with ratings 30% higher than before Jennings's appearance. By the end of Jeopardy!'s 20th season several weeks later, the show had surpassed sister program Wheel of Fortune in the ratings, though Wheel still benefited from the streak in markets where Jeopardy! is its lead-in in the common scheduling tactic for both shows. Jennings was credited with boosting the program's popularity as a whole, which at that point had been on the air for two decades but primarily attracted an older demographic.

The attention changed Jennings's life, making him a household name. Jennings guested on several TV shows, including The Tonight Show, Nightline, Live with Regis and Kelly, Sesame Street, and the Late Show with David Letterman, where he read the Top Ten List of Ways To Irritate Alex Trebek. Publicists for the program reportedly divided his appearances evenly between ABC and CBS—the former a frequent affiliate for the show and the latter a sister company to the show's syndicator. Taking advantage of the notoriety of Jennings's losing Final Jeopardy! answer, H&R Block offered him free tax planning and financial services for life, with a senior vice president for the company estimating that he owed about $1.04 million in taxes on his winnings. BBDO created an advertisement for FedEx in the USA Today newspaper three days after his final game reading "There's only one time FedEx has ever been the wrong answer" and congratulating Jennings on his streak. Barbara Walters named him one of her 10 Most Fascinating People of 2004. In a 2011 Reddit AMA, Jennings recalled that in 2004 the Democratic politicians Chuck Schumer and Harry Reid asked him to run for the United States Senate from Utah. He wrote, "That was when I realized the Democratic Party was f@#$ed [sic] in '04". At the end of the decade, Entertainment Weekly put his run on its "best of" list: "Answer: A software engineer from Utah, he dominated the quizfest for a record 74 shows in 2004, amassing $2,520,700. Question: Who is Ken Jennings?"

Jennings donated 10% of his winnings to the LDS Church. His streak also made an impact backstage, with the producers implementing some changes during his run. Normally, contestants get only a short time to practice, but more rehearsal time was added so that the new players could get comfortable with the buzzers. Additionally, the person who managed the buzzer system was changed. In his book Brainiac, Jennings says that the consistency of the original manager's timing had given an increasing advantage to continuing players, and that the change made a noticeable difference in season 21. At one point, announcer Johnny Gilbert stopped announcing Jennings's total wins during the show's opening.

Jennings's losing episode can be seen on the 2005 DVD release of Jeopardy!: An Inside Look at America's Favorite Quiz Show. In 2023 his entire run was made available for the first time, streaming on Pluto TV.

==== Tournaments ====
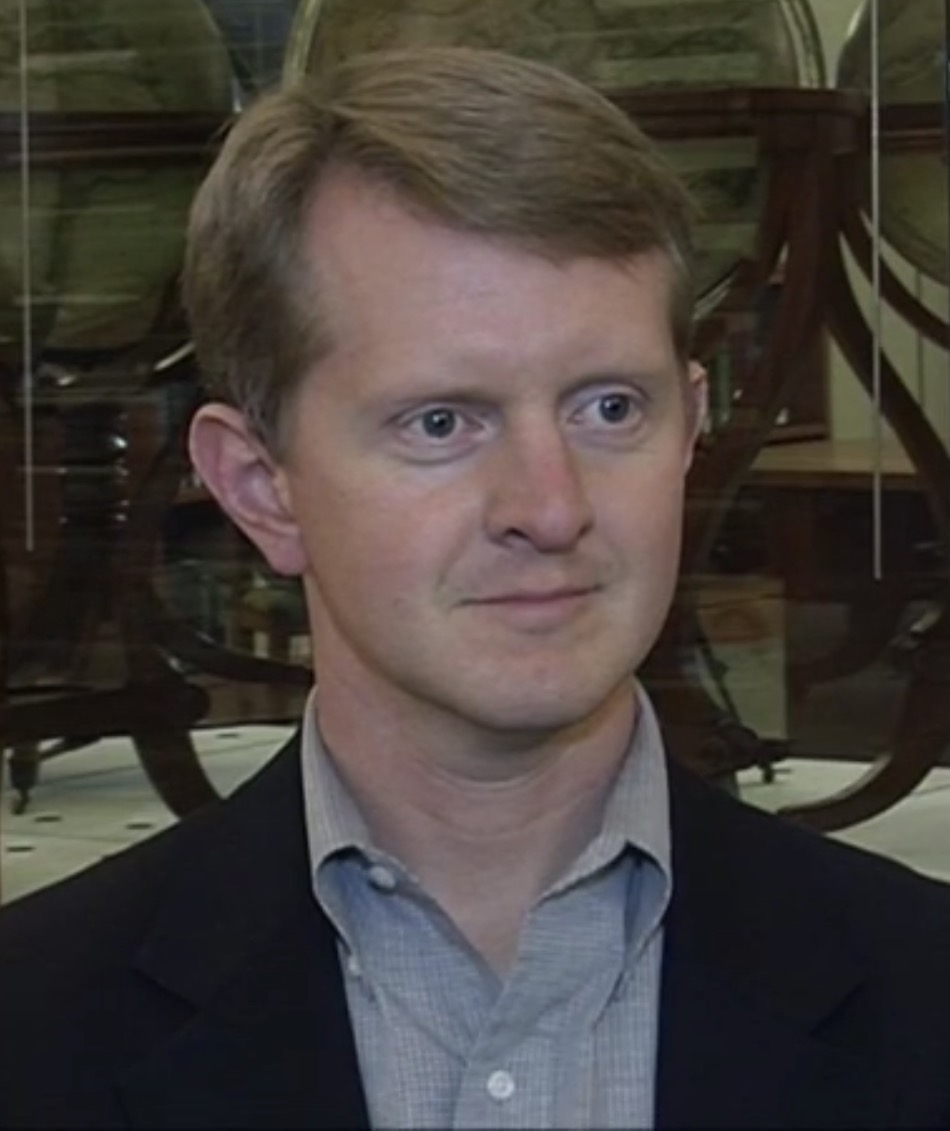
Jennings in 2012

Jennings returned to the program several times over the years as a contestant in its tournaments. He first rejoined the show for the 15-week, 75-show Jeopardy! Ultimate Tournament of Champions in 2005. The field totaled 145 players including Jennings, who, unlike the other competitors, was automatically placed in the finals. In the final round, Brad Rutter defeated Jennings and Jerome Vered, with respective final scores of $62,000, $34,599, and $20,600. Jennings won the $500,000 prize for second place, but Rutter temporarily displaced him as the highest overall money winner on game shows.

Jennings returned for the 2011 "IBM Challenge", which featured the company's Watson against Jennings and Rutter in two matches played over three days, the first man-versus-machine competition in the show's history. Watson won, earning $1,000,000 for two charities. Jennings was second and Rutter was third, receiving $300,000 and $200,000, respectively. Jennings and Rutter each pledged to donate half of their winnings to charity. At the end of the first episode, in which only the first match's Jeopardy! round was aired, Rutter was tied with Watson at $5,000, while Jennings was in third with $2,000. After the second episode, in which the first game was completed, Jennings remained at third with $4,800 while Rutter at second had $10,400. The competition ended with Watson with $77,147, Jennings with $24,000, and Rutter with $21,600. Below his response during the Final Jeopardy! round, Jennings wrote, "I for one welcome our new computer overlords." It was the first time Rutter had been defeated by a human player, although the defeat is not on Rutter's Jeopardy! official record, as the competition was deemed an exhibition. Jennings wrote about playing against Watson for Slate.

Jennings participated in the 2014 Jeopardy! Battle of the Decades tournament, making the finals along with Rutter and Roger Craig. Jennings finished in second place, winning $100,000, and Rutter won, earning $1,000,000. In the 2019 Jeopardy! All-Star Games, with 18 former champions, Jennings was one of six captains, choosing 2015 Tournament of Champions runner-up Matt Jackson and 2012 Jeopardy! College Champion Monica Thieu (who coincidentally eliminated Jennings in a 2016 episode of 500 Questions) for "Team Ken". Team Ken finished second to the team captained by Rutter, with Jennings winning $100,000, one-third of the $300,000 second-place prize. In January 2020, ABC aired the Jeopardy! The Greatest of All Time tournament between Jennings, Rutter, and James Holzhauer. Jennings won the championship, earning the "Greatest of All Time" title and a $1,000,000 prize, bringing his lifetime Jeopardy! winnings to $3,522,700.

==== Hosting ====
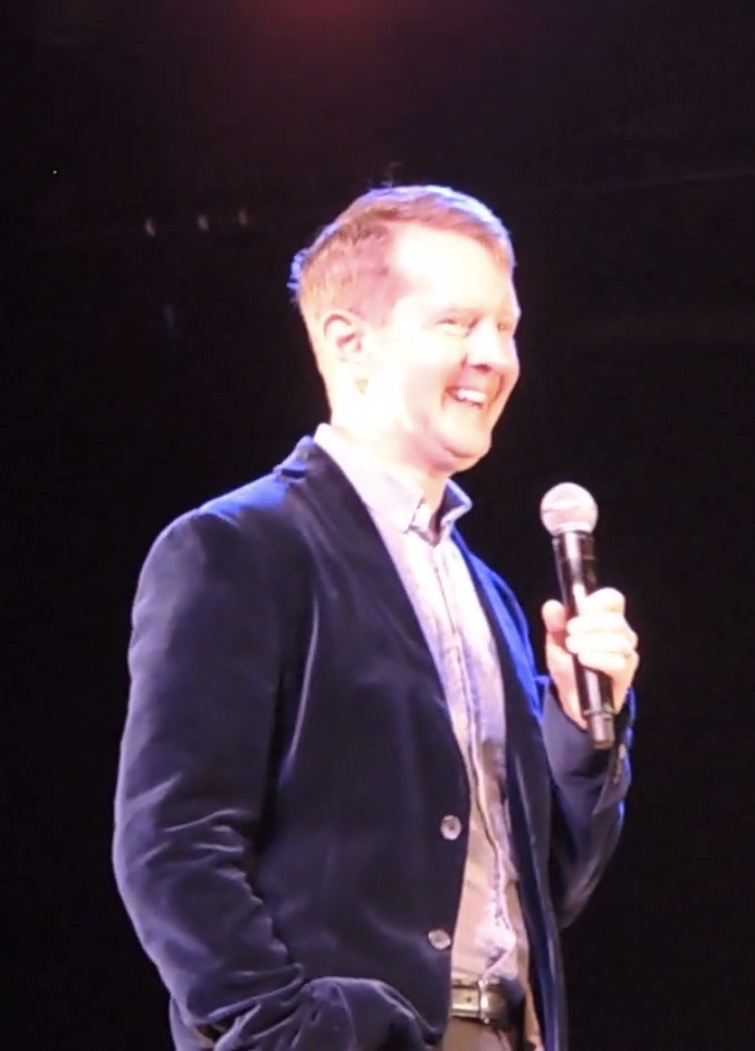
Jennings in 2020

In September 2020, Jennings signed on as a consulting producer of Jeopardy! for the show's 37th season, a job that included reading on-air categories. Alex Trebek, the longtime host of Jeopardy!, had been diagnosed with stage four pancreatic cancer the previous year. Trebek taped his final episode of the program on October 29, 2020. Contingency plans were made for him to miss the next taping, scheduled for November 9–10, as he planned to have surgery. Supervising producers Lisa Broffman and Rock Schmidt named Jennings the interim host for the taping and Jennings had a final conversation with Trebek days before the rehearsal was set to commence. The rehearsal was scheduled for November 8 but was canceled when Schmidt informed the staff that Trebek had died that day.

Jennings was widely viewed as an heir to the role as host; Trebek had also reportedly considered Jennings his rightful successor. Trebek's widow, Jean, gave Jennings a pair of cufflinks Trebek wore as a gift before his first taping as host. Jennings was announced as the first in a series of guest hosts in November 2020. His episodes aired from January 11 to February 19, 2021. Later, The Wall Street Journal reported that Jennings was indeed intended to be sole host, but controversy over his remarks on social media hurt his standing, with poor ratings from focus groups and Sony executives fearing his selection could cause backlash.

After a brief period in which producer Mike Richards was named host and soon dismissed due to controversy, Jennings resumed hosting the daily syndicated program alongside actress Mayim Bialik, who had also guest-hosted during 2021. The next year, it was announced that Jennings, along with Bialik, would split hosting duties full-time beginning with season 39. On ABC, Jennings also began hosting the new Jeopardy! Masters series, a primetime tournament featuring six recent notable Jeopardy! champions competing against each other in a "Champions League-style" format. The program premiered on May 8, 2023.

After Bialik withdrew from Jeopardy! on May 11, 2023, due to the 2023 Hollywood labor disputes, Jennings hosted the last 20 episodes of season 39. Five days later, it was announced that Jennings would host the second season of Celebrity Jeopardy!. In September, Jennings was nominated for Outstanding Host for a Game Show at the 75th Primetime Emmy Awards. After the strikes were resolved, Jennings became the permanent sole host of Jeopardy! starting with season 40. Reporter Claire McNear wrote, "Many Jeopardy! staff members came to believe that Jennings had become the technically superior host, according to a source close to production, who says that Jennings's improvement was the key factor that spelled the end for Bialik."

==== 2023 Writers Guild of America strike ====
In May 2023, the Writers Guild of America announced that its unionized writers would strike as part of negotiations largely related to increases in pay, benefits, and protections against artificial intelligence. Bialik, Jennings's then co-host, refused to participate in the show's final week of taping as a result. Jennings was reportedly brought in as the host "as a result of Bialik's decision". While this initially led to accusations of strikebreaking, a statement from SAG-AFTRA said that Jeopardy! operates under a different contract than shows that went on strike, and Jennings was therefore not crossing picket lines. The show returned for season 40 in late 2023, using a mix of recycled material and clues written before the strike; the program had made a similar move during the 2007–08 strike.

=== Writing career and other media ===
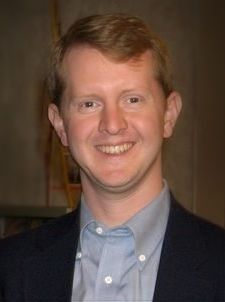
Jennings in 2007

After his initial success on Jeopardy!, Jennings secured a book deal and left his career as a programmer to pursue his love of writing. Brainiac: Adventures in the Curious, Competitive, Compulsive World of Trivia Buffs (2006) details his experiences on Jeopardy! and his research into trivia culture conducted after the completion of his run. Ken Jennings' Trivia Almanac: 8,888 Questions in 365 Days, a hardcover book, is a compilation of trivia questions—with three categories and about 20 questions per day of the year. Maphead: Charting the Wide, Weird World of Geography Wonks explores the world of map and geography enthusiasts. Because I Said So! is a humorous examination of "the myths, tales & warnings every generation passes down to its kids". Jennings has also written five books for his children's series, Junior Genius Guides. In 2018, he published Planet Funny: How Comedy Took Over Our Culture, which analyzes how comedy has taken over mainstream pop culture and everyday life.

Jennings has written and edited literature and mythology questions for the National Academic Quiz Tournaments (NAQT), a quiz bowl organization. He read questions as a moderator at the 2005, 2006, and 2009 NAQT High School National Championship Tournaments in Chicago. Jennings had a weekly trivia column, Kennections, in Parade magazine. In it, five questions were posed whose answers were connected to a mystery topic, which readers had to guess. Parade ceased the quiz in early 2015 and removed links to archived quizzes in March 2015. Kennections now appears in the online version of Mental Floss magazine. The Complete Kennections, a book compiling 1,000 of the puzzles, was published in 2025. Jennings also had a column in Mental Floss magazine called "Six Degrees of Ken Jennings", where readers submitted two wildly different things that Jennings had to connect in exactly six steps, in the style of the Six Degrees of Kevin Bacon game. The column ran from November 2005 to the September–October 2010 issue.

Jennings also wrote a trivia newsletter, "Trivia Tuesday", that ran from 2006 to 2021. Every Tuesday, beginning July 4, 2006, he sent out an email containing seven questions. The seventh, a question asking what several items have in common, was designed to be Google-resistant. Subscribers responded with the answers to all seven questions and results were maintained on a scoreboard on Jennings's blog. Every 10 weeks, the respondent with the most seventh questions correct was awarded a signed copy of his newest book. After 800 quizzes, on November 16, 2021, due to increasing commitments related to Jeopardy!, book tours, and running out of material for the seventh question, Jennings discontinued the newsletter.

Jennings won the rookie division of the American Crossword Puzzle Tournament in 2006. He was an active member of the trivia app FleetWit, regularly playing in the live trivia races. As of March 2018, on average, he had answered 89% of questions correctly and won over $2,000. He also competed regularly in LearnedLeague under the name "JenningsK". His last active season was LL85 (May 2020), when he played in the A Rundle of the Laguna league and finished in 5th place.

=== Other television and game show appearances ===
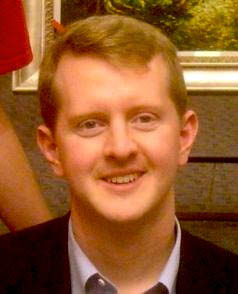
Jennings in 2008

In the aftermath of his Jeopardy! fame, Jennings signed with United Talent Agency, which hoped to expand him into a commercial pitchman or TV host. In 2005 and 2006, he engaged in several endorsements, including a deal with Microsoft to promote its Encarta encyclopedia software, and Cingular Wireless (now AT&T) featured Jennings in commercials portraying him as having lots of "friends and family" coming out of the woodwork once he began winning on Jeopardy!. He was also involved in speaking deals through the Massachusetts-based speakers' agency American Program Bureau. University Games produced a Can You Beat Ken? board game, in which players vie against each other and Jennings in an attempt to earn $2.6 million first. Each question in the game was asked to Jennings, and his answers, both correct and incorrect, are recorded on the cards.

According to Variety, Jennings was slated to host a new game show for Comedy Central set to premiere in 2005 or 2006, but the project stalled in development. Michael Davies was attached to produce it. Jennings wrote on his website, "Stephen Colbert's show was doing so well in its post-Daily Show spot that Comedy Central decided they weren't in the market for a quiz show anymore." As of mid-2006, he was still shopping a potential game show titled Ken Jennings vs. the Rest of the World. Davies later joined Jeopardy! in the 2020s and became its executive producer and showrunner as Jennings assumed the role as host.

In the years between his stint as contestant and host of Jeopardy!, Jennings appeared on many other game shows. He taped a pilot for a proposed CBS revival of Pyramid titled Million Dollar Pyramid and was a contestant on Wait Wait... Don't Tell Me! and 1 vs. 100 in 2006, Grand Slam in 2007, Stump the Master in 2008–09, 500 Questions in 2016, and @midnight in 2017. His appearance on Are You Smarter than a 5th Grader? in 2008 held the possibility of exceeding Brad Rutter's total game show winnings had Jennings decided to risk the million-dollar question. He also appeared on Who Wants to Be a Millionaire as an expert for the lifeline "Ask the Expert". Jennings appeared on Millionaire in 2014 as a contestant during Guinness World Records Edition themed week, winning $100,000 after deciding to walk away on his $250,000 question. If he had gone for it, Jennings would have been right. He returned to the show as a contestant in 2025, paired with Matt Damon, and they won $1,000,000 for Water.org. Jennings was one of eight recurring "Trivia Experts" for Best Ever Trivia Show, which debuted in 2019; he was also one of the six trivia experts on Best Ever's successor, Master Minds, in 2020.

In November 2020, it was announced that Jennings would be one of the three chasers on the ABC revival of The Chase, hosted by Sara Haines, with Rutter and Holzhauer as the other chasers, joined by Mark Labbett in season 2. Jennings left after the second season. In May 2023, he competed against Mayim Bialik and Vanna White on an episode of Celebrity Wheel of Fortune, winning $72,800 for the Equal Justice Initiative.

Jennings also appeared on multiple episodes of Doug Loves Movies, hosted by Doug Benson. On September 7, 2017, HowStuffWorks unveiled a new show, Omnibus, co-hosted by Jennings and John Roderick, frontman of the indie-rock band The Long Winters. They picked topics they feared might be lost to history and discussed them. On August 9, 2019, they announced their separation from iHeartRadio and shifted to a Patreon-funded model. On January 1, 2023, the podcast decreased from twice to once a week, citing the time required for Jennings's work as Jeopardy! host. On September 30, 2025, it was announced that Jennings would leave the podcast as a regular co-host due to his Jeopardy! commitments. He is set to remain as the podcast's executive producer and occasional guest host. Jennings did his final performance live on November 8, 2025, in Seattle. Jennings also narrated the audiobook version of Alex Trebek's autobiography, The Answer Is.... His rendition was nominated for the Grammy Award for Best Spoken Word Album at the 63rd Grammy Awards.

== Social media ==
Jennings was once an active Twitter user. Some of his tweets sparked controversy.

In 2014, Jennings came under criticism for posting "Nothing sadder than a hot person in a wheelchair." The controversy continued for years, drawing condemnation from disability rights activists such as Rebecca Cokley in 2020.

On November 10, 2015, Jennings was criticized when he tweeted a joke about the death of Daniel Fleetwood, a lifelong Star Wars fan who died of cancer. Fleetwood's dying wish was to see Star Wars: The Force Awakens, fearing he likely would not live to see it when it opened in theaters in December 2015. An online campaign started on his behalf and his wish was granted only days before he died. Jennings said, "It can't be a good sign that every fan who has seen the new Star Wars movie died shortly thereafter."

On May 31, 2017, Jennings tweeted a joke involving Barron Trump, U.S. President Donald Trump's son. After 11-year-old Barron saw an image of Kathy Griffin holding a bloody mask modeled after his father, he believed that it was real and screamed. Jennings wrote, "Barron Trump saw a very long necktie on a heap of expired deli meat in a dumpster. He thought it was his dad & his little heart is breaking." After the tweet drew controversy, Jennings said, "The joke doesn't mock Barron. It mocks using him for political cover."

In August 2018, Jennings was criticized for his description of an elderly woman tweeting about her deceased son. When she tweeted about her son's love of the 1980s television character ALF, Jennings responded, "This awful MAGA grandma is my favorite person on Twitter."

In December 2020, Jennings apologized on Twitter for some of his past tweets and subsequently deleted them. A month later, Jennings faced controversy again when his friend and podcast co-host John Roderick posted a Twitter thread in which he claimed to have prevented his nine-year-old daughter from eating until she learned to open a can of baked beans using a manual can opener, which he said took about six hours. The incident caused controversial past tweets to resurface in which Roderick made comments that were seen as using antisemitic, homophobic, racist, and other derogatory language. Jennings defended Roderick, saying he was "a loving and attentive dad who ... tells heightened-for-effect stories."

== Personal life ==
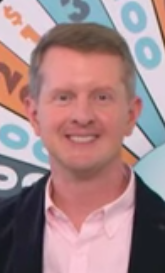
Jennings in 2019

While studying at Brigham Young University, Jennings met his future wife, Mindy; they became engaged and were married in 2000, shortly after graduating. Their relationship has remained largely private, with Mindy, a former preschool teacher, avoiding public appearances alongside her husband. They have two children: a son and a daughter. After his success on Jeopardy!, Jennings and his family moved to Seattle. He splits his time between writing and hosting Jeopardy!. The show tapes in Culver City, California, but Jennings continues to reside primarily in Seattle as of 2022, flying to Los Angeles twice a month for tapings.

=== Beliefs ===
A member of the Church of Jesus Christ of Latter-day Saints, Jennings has called his faith central to his personal grounding and moral framework. Raised in the faith, Jennings has credited it with providing balance during his sudden fame after his 2004 winning streak, emphasizing principles that encouraged humility and perspective amid financial success.

Jennings has publicly defended the Church of Jesus Christ of Latter-day Saints against derogatory stereotypes, expressing fatigue in a 2007 New York Daily News op-ed with portrayals of it as "either a gullible joke or a satanic menace". He has highlighted the church's role in his life, including plans to tithe 10% of his Jeopardy! earnings to the church after his 2004 victories. But Jennings has also critiqued specific church policies, such as the November 2015 exclusion of children from same-sex couples from baptism until age 18, arguing it contradicted Jesus's teachings and calling it un-Christlike.

Jennings actively practices his faith, and has discussed its influence on his worldview, including reflections on death shaped by the Church's theology. Friends and observers describe him as religiously grounded but understated in demeanor, not proselytizing but open about his beliefs.

=== Political views ===
On January 7, 2026, after the killing of Renée Good by United States Immigration and Customs Enforcement during the second presidency of Donald Trump, Jennings wrote on the social media outlet Bluesky: "The 'prosecute the former regime at every level' candidate has my vote in 2028." Some criticized his post, but he later posted, "It's been a dark week, but I just saw someone reply to an Abolish ICE post with a scoldy Bluesky 'Uh, try abolish DHS' and that joy will sustain me for a little while". He also shared other posts indicating that Good's killing was his tipping point.

In August 2026, Jennings spoke out against transphobia and said he cares about transgender rights more deeply than any other issue.

== Records ==
Jennings and Brad Rutter alternated as the top two highest-earning American game show contestants until March 25, 2025, when David Genat, an Australian model and television personality, broke Jennings's record by winning $5,800,000 on Deal or No Deal Island. Jennings has won money on five different game shows, including $4,522,700 on Jeopardy!. He also holds the record for the longest winning streak on Jeopardy! and the record for the highest average correct responses per game (for those contestants with at least 300 correct responses), with 35.9 during his original run (no other contestant has exceeded 30) and 33.1 overall, including tournaments and special events.

Jennings's total earnings on Jeopardy! are $4,522,700: $2,520,700 over his 74 wins; a $2,000 second-place prize in his 75th appearance; a $500,000 second-place prize in the Jeopardy! Ultimate Tournament of Champions (2005); a $300,000 second-place prize in Jeopardy!'s IBM Challenge (2011); a $100,000 second-place prize in the Jeopardy! Battle of the Decades (2014); a $100,000 second-place prize (his share of his team's $300,000 prize) in the Jeopardy! All-Star Games (2019); and a $1,000,000 first-place prize in Jeopardy! The Greatest of All Time (2020).

During his first run of Jeopardy! appearances, Jennings set the record for the highest American game show winnings. His total was surpassed by Rutter, who defeated Jennings in the finals of the Jeopardy! Ultimate Tournament of Champions, adding $2 million to Rutter's Jeopardy! winnings. Jennings regained the record after appearances on several other game shows, culminating with a 2008 appearance on Are You Smarter Than a 5th Grader?, though Rutter retained the record for highest Jeopardy! winnings and once again passed Jennings's total upon winning the Jeopardy! Battle of the Decades tournament in 2014. In 2020, Jennings faced Rutter again, as well as James Holzhauer, in a special prime-time series, Jeopardy! The Greatest of All Time. Jennings won.

=== Recognition ===
On March 3, 2020, the Washington State Legislature approved Senate Resolution 8704, congratulating Jennings for his achievements on game shows.

== Work ==
=== Filmography ===
Year	Title	Role	Notes
2013	Marie	Self	Episode: Meredith Baxter & Michael Gross
2014, 2025	Who Wants to Be a Millionaire	Self	Jennings won $100,000 in 2014 and $1,000,000 in 2025.
2017	The Simpsons	Self	(voice); Episode: The Caper Chase
2021-present	Jeopardy	Host	Co-host until 2023, host since 2023
2022	Call Me Kat	Self (cameo appearance)	Episode: Call Me Ken Jennings
2022–2023	The $100,000 Pyramid	Self – Celebrity Player	Episode: Ken Jennings vs Ross Mathews and RuPaul vs Carson Kressley; Episode: Deon Cole vs D'arcy Carden and Ken Jennings vs Mario Cantone
2022–present	Celebrity Jeopardy!	Self – Clue Giver	Episode: Quarterfinal #3: Constance Wu, Ike Barinholtz and Jalen Rose
2022–present	Celebrity Jeopardy!	Self – Host	Season 2–present
2023	Celebrity Wheel of Fortune	Self – Celebrity Contestant	Episode: Vanna White, Ken Jennings and Mayim Bialik
2023	Jeopardy! Masters	Self – Host	19 episodes
2025	25 Words or Less	Self – Sub-host	5 episodes
2025	Happy Gilmore 2	Self (cameo appearance)	
2025	Platonic	Himself	Episode: "Jeopardy"

=== Bibliography ===
External videos
- Presentation by Jennings on Maphead, September 20, 2011, C-SPAN

- Jennings, Ken (2025). The Complete Kennections: 5,000 Questions in 1,000 Puzzles. New York: Scribner. ISBN 978-1-6680-5653-0.
- Jennings, Ken (2023). 100 Places to See After You Die: A Travel Guide to the Afterlife. New York: Scribner. ISBN 978-1-5011-3158-5. OCLC 1347430851.
- Jennings, Ken (2018). Planet Funny: How Comedy Took Over Our Culture. New York: Scribner. ISBN 978-1-5011-0058-1.
- Jennings, Ken (2016). Ken Jennings' Junior Genius Guides: Dinosaurs. New York: Little Simon. ISBN 978-1-4814-2956-6.
- Jennings, Ken (2015). Ken Jennings' Junior Genius Guides: Ancient Egypt. New York: Little Simon. ISBN 978-1-4814-2952-8.
- Jennings, Ken (2015). Ken Jennings' Junior Genius Guides: The Human Body. New York: Little Simon. ISBN 978-1-4814-0173-9.
- Jennings, Ken (2014). Ken Jennings' Junior Genius Guides: Outer Space. New York: Little Simon. ISBN 978-1-4814-0170-8.
- Jennings, Ken (2014). Ken Jennings' Junior Genius Guides: U.S. Presidents. New York: Little Simon. ISBN 978-1-4424-7332-4.
- Jennings, Ken (2014). Ken Jennings' Junior Genius Guides: Greek Mythology. New York: Little Simon. ISBN 978-1-4424-7330-0.
- Jennings, Ken (2014). Ken Jennings' Junior Genius Guides: Maps and Geography. New York: Little Simon. ISBN 978-1-4424-7328-7.
- Jennings, Ken (2012). Because I Said So! The Truth Behind the Myths, Tales, and Warnings Every Generation Passes Down to Its Kids. New York: Scribner. ISBN 978-1-4516-5625-1.
- Jennings, Ken (2011). Maphead: Charting the Wide, Weird World of Geography Wonks. New York: Scribner. ISBN 978-1-4391-6717-5.
- Jennings, Ken (2010). Colossal Book of Wordplay. New York: Puzzlewright. ISBN 978-1-4027-6503-2., with Martin Gardner
- Jennings, Ken (2008). Ken Jennings's Trivia Almanac: 8,888 Questions in 365 Days. New York: Villard. ISBN 978-0-345-49997-4.
- Jennings, Ken (2006). Brainiac: Adventures in the Curious, Competitive, Compulsive World of Trivia Buffs. New York: Villard. ISBN 978-1-4000-6445-8.

== Accolades ==
In 2021, Jennings was nominated for a Grammy Award at the 63rd Annual Grammy Awards in 2021 for Best Spoken Word Album for Alex Trebek's autobiography The Answer Is...

In 2023, 2024, and 2025, Jennings received three consecutive nominations for the Primetime Emmy Award for Outstanding Host for a Game Show for his work on Jeopardy!, though he did not win the award in any of those years. In 2024, he earned the Online Film & Television Association (OFTA) Television Award for Best Host or Individual in a Variety or Music Program for hosting Jeopardy!. In January 2025, Jennings was inducted into the Jeopardy! Hall of Fame for his contributions as both host and a record-setting contestant.

== See also ==
- List of notable Jeopardy! contestants
- Strategies and skills of Jeopardy! champions
