= Make Me an Egghead =

British quiz show

- Directed by: Suzanne Pearse
- Presented by: Jeremy Vine
- Starring: Dave Rainford; Lisa Thiel; Pat Gibson; Barry Simmons; Chris Hughes; Kevin Ashman; Judith Keppel
- Country of origin: United Kingdom
- No. of series: 1
- No. of episodes: 25

Production
- Executive producers: Andy Culpin; Rob Dean
- Producer: Claire Capaldi
- Running time: 30/45 minutes
- Production company: 12 Yard

Original release
- Network: BBC Two
- Release: 22 August – 23 September 2016

Make Me an Egghead is a British quiz show on BBC Two presented by Jeremy Vine. It was a spin-off from Eggheads with the goal to find two further Eggheads, one male and one female, to complement the existing team of seven. It ran from 22 August to 23 September 2016 and was won by Steve Cooke and Beth Webster. A similar show, Are You an Egghead?, aired in 2008 and 2009.

== Background ==
After CJ de Mooi left Eggheads for an acting career in Cape Town, South Africa, the BBC announced that it would be airing a televised search for two replacement Eggheads, one male, one female. The show aired adjacently to Debatable: the former at 6 pm, Make Me an Egghead at 6:30 pm. Both were commissioned for twenty half-hour episodes and five 45-minute episodes, and both were broadcast for the first time on the same day, 22 August 2016.

== Format ==
The heats were played in five rounds. The first three rounds focused on one of nine subject categories (out of Politics, Arts & Books, Food & Drink, History, Geography, Science, Music, Film & Television and Sport). Both players were asked in turn three triple-choice questions, and the player with the most correct answers won the round. If there was no winner, the round entered sudden death where alternative answers were not given. The winner selects any of the five Eggheads that have not yet been chosen and three head start points for the quickfire round if they win the general knowledge round. The fourth round is a variant of the first three, and is a general knowledge round with the challenger able to consult each Egghead they have won, although only once. The winner of this round is the winner of the contest and starts with three points for each of the first three rounds won. They then compete in the fifth round, a quickfire round for two minutes with a point for each correct answer. The leading four male and female contenders advance to the semi-final stage.

=== Results ===
The contestant in bold won and contested the quickfire round, while the contestant in normal fonts was eliminated.

Episode	Date	Gender	Contestants and head-to-head results	Quickfire points	Total points
1	22 August 2016	Male	**Gareth Kingston** 2–1 Alan Heath	14	20
2	23 August 2016	Female	**Marianne Fairthorne** 2–1 Dani Harvie	14	20
3	24 August 2016	Male	Michael Taylor 1–2 **Ian Bayley**	21	27
4	25 August 2016	Female	**Nancy Dickmann** 1–2 Nicola Morgan	12	15
5	26 August 2016	Male	**Rupy Jandu** 1–2 Sam Roberts	9	12
6	29 August 2016	Female	Diane Hallagan 0–3 **Kit Lommerud-Olsen**	11	20
7	30 August 2016	Male	**Craig Element** 1–2 Saïd Khan	18	21
8	31 August 2016	Female	Kathryn Johnson 2–1 **Amber Marshall**	13	16
9	1 September 2016	Male	**Gary Grant** 3–0 Martyn Oram	19	28
10	2 September 2016	Female	Emma Laslett 0–3 **Frankie Fanko**	15	24
11	5 September 2016	Male	**Steve Cooke** 3–0 Clive Dunning	23	32
12	6 September 2016	Female	**Nicki Cockburn** 3–0 Katy Williams	16	25
13	7 September 2016	Male	David Edwards 2–1 **Terry Toomey**	15	18
14	8 September 2016	Female	Janet French 2–1 **Lou Wilson**	5	8
15	9 September 2016	Male	**Gerard Mackay** 1–2 Jamie Dodding	24	27
16	12 September 2016	Female	Rachael Neiman 1–2 **Beth Webster**	15	21
17	13 September 2016	Male	**Brian Davis** 2–1 Michael McPartland	11	17
18	14 September 2016	Female	Jo Neill 0–3 **Dr Jane McCartney**	6	15
19	15 September 2016	Male	Nic Paul 1–2 **Dom Tait**	17	23
20	16 September 2016	Female	Steph O'Donoghue 1–2 **Julia Hobbs**	16	22

**Men's leaderboard**

Place	Contestant	Total score
1	Steve Cooke	32
2	Gary Grant	28
3	Gerard Mackay	27
4	Ian Bayley	27
5	Dom Tait	23
6	Craig Element	21
7	Gareth Kingston	20
8	Terry Toomey	18
9	Brian Davis	17
10	Rupy Jandu	12

**Women's leaderboard**

Place	Contestant	Total score
1	Nicki Cockburn	25
2	Frankie Fanko	24
3	Julia Hobbs	22
4	Beth Webster	21
5	Marianne Fairthorne	20
6	Kit Lommerud-Olsen	20
7	Amber Marshall	16
8	Dr Jane McCartney	15
9	Nancy Dickmann	15
10	Lou Wilson	8

In the event of a tie, the leader was the contestant who answered their last correct answer earliest in the quickfire round.

== Semi-finals ==
The format was the same as that used previously on Are You an Egghead?, with the two contestants playing five head-to-head rounds and then a final round to decide the winner. The prize for winning a head-to-head round is to choose one of the Eggheads to help in the final round.

In the five preliminary rounds, the contestants are given a category, with the player who came higher on the leader board after the first round choosing whether or not to go first in the opening round. They are asked three multiple choice questions each; if these result in a tie, non-multiple choice questions are asked in pairs, in a sudden death fashion. The winner then gets to choose an Egghead and whether to go first or second in the next round.

After the preliminary rounds the final round takes place, in which the contestants are asked five General Knowledge multiple choice questions each. Sudden death again determines the winner should the scores be level after the first five questions. The contestants can call on the help of the Eggheads they have won in the head to head rounds should they wish. An individual Egghead can only be used once, although more than one Egghead can be used for a particular question.

=== Results ===
Episode	Date	Gender	Contestants and final round score	Eggheads selected
21	19 September 2016	Male	Gary Grant 3–5 Gerard Mackay	Gerard (4): Pat, Lisa, Judith, Barry. Gary (1): Kevin
22	20 September 2016	Female	Frankie Fanko 2–4 Julia Hobbs	Julia (3): Pat, Lisa, Chris. Frankie (2): Dave, Barry
23	21 September 2016	Male	Steve Cooke 5–3 Ian Bayley	Ian (2): Pat, Barry. Steve (3): Kevin, Lisa, Dave
24	22 September 2016	Female	Nicki Cockburn 3–4 Beth Webster	Beth (5): Judith, Kevin, Dave, Lisa, Pat. Nicki (0)

== Final ==
In the final there were two head-to-head rounds with each contestant choosing the category for one of the two rounds. The winner of each round earned a three-point head start for the final round. The final general knowledge round was played up to ten, the contestants starting with the points gained in the two head-to-head rounds. The questions in the final round were not multiple-choice.

=== Results ===
Episode	Date	Gender	Contestants and final score
25	23 September 2016	Male	Steve Cooke 10 (3) – 5 (3) Gerard Mackay
25	23 September 2016	Female	Julia Hobbs 6 (0) – 10 (6) Beth Webster

The number given in brackets was the head start score after the head-to-head rounds.

Steve Cooke, the winning man, is a member of Mensa who previously won £12,900 on The People Versus in 2001.

Beth Webster, the winning woman, holds a record for the most appearances by a woman on the BBC's Mastermind. She is active on the Quizzing Grand Prix Circuit in the United Kingdom, and in The Quiz League of London. She and the Women's runner-up, Julia Hobbs, were both ranked as "Sages" in the 2012 Order of Merit listings of the British Quiz Association.
