= Are You an Egghead? =

British quiz show

- Created by: Paul Brassey; Daniel Moody
- Presented by: Dermot Murnaghan
- Starring: Judith Keppel; Kevin Ashman; CJ de Mooi; Daphne Fowler; Chris Hughes; Barry Simmons
- Country of origin: United Kingdom
- No. of series: 2
- No. of episodes: 62

Production
- Executive producers: David Young; Andy Culpin
- Running time: 45 minutes
- Production company: 12 Yard

Original release
- Network: BBC Two
- Release: 20 October 2008 – 23 November 2009

Are You an Egghead? is a BBC quiz show that was presented by Dermot Murnaghan. It is a spin-off from the quiz show Eggheads, with its goal to find a further Egghead to complement the existing team. The first series was aired weekdays from 20 October to 2 December 2008 and was won by Barry Simmons. The second and final series was aired from 12 October to 23 November 2009 and was won by Pat Gibson. A similar show, Make Me an Egghead, aired in 2016.

== Origins ==
In May 2008, auditions for a sixth person to join the Eggheads team began. These auditions developed into a spin-off show, hosted by original Eggheads presenter Dermot Murnaghan. During the first series, from 20 October to 2 December 2008, the show aired at 4:30pm, weekdays on BBC Two.

Series 2 also aired at 4:30pm on BBC Two and began on 12 October 2009.

The auditions whittled the competition down to 32 contestants, who then played against each other in a straight knockout format to decide who would become the sixth Egghead. There were 16 first round matches, 8 in the second round, 4 quarterfinal matches and two semifinals and the final.

=== Rounds ===
The format is similar to that of the original Eggheads show with the two contestants on the day playing five head-to-head main rounds and then a final round to decide the winner. The difference is that in Are You an Egghead? the prize for winning a head-to-head round is to choose one of the existing Eggheads to be on your team in the final.

In the five main rounds, the contestants are given a category, with the player who has won the coin toss before the show choosing whether or not to go first in the opening round. They are asked three multiple choice questions each; if these result in a tie, non-multiple choice questions are asked in pairs, in a sudden death fashion. The winner then gets to choose an Egghead and whether to go first or second in the next round.

After the main rounds the final takes place, in which the contestants are asked five multiple choice questions each (sudden death again determining a winner should the scores be level after the first five questions). The contestants can call on the help of the Eggheads they have won in the head to head rounds (once each) should they wish. The advantage in the final round should be with the contestant who has won more of the main rounds and hence has more Eggheads on their team, although the Egghead might not necessarily know the answer when they are asked and the contestant does not have to take their answer. Like Eggheads, the category is always General Knowledge in the final.

=== Final ===
The final of Are You an Egghead? has a slightly different format from that of the first five rounds, in the following ways:

- The prize for winning one of the five head-to-head rounds is a point towards the contestant's tally in the final round, rather than an Egghead.
- The final general knowledge round is played first up to ten correct answers, rather than asking each finalist five questions.
- All questions in the final round are non-multiple-choice.

=== Subjects ===
There are nine possible subjects (the same as Eggheads) in the head-to-head rounds.

- Politics
- Arts & Books
- Food & Drink
- History
- Geography
- Science
- Music
- Film & Television
- Sport

== Results ==
The opportunity to become the sixth Egghead attracted some of the 'biggest' names from the British quizzing scene as they attempt to join 'arguably the greatest quiz team in Britain'.

=== Series 1 ===
==== Last 32 ====
Match One: Stephanie Bruce v. David Rainford: The National Lottery People's Quiz winner from 2007 Stephanie Bruce was defeated by former Who Wants to Be a Millionaire? contestant David Rainford 5–3 in the final round after David had won four head-to-heads to Stephanie's one.

Match Two: Jenny Ryan v. Mark Labbett: Jenny Ryan, a regular on the British quizzing circuit, defeated Mark Labbett 5–3 after a closely fought contest. Jenny won three head-to-heads to Mark's two. Mark made an error in the final round on one question whereas Jenny got all hers correct. Mark admitted afterwards that he should have asked for Daphne's help on the question (On which island of the Bahamas is the capital Nassau?) which she would have known.

Match Three: Kathryn Johnson v. James Webb: James Webb, a former University Challenge semifinalist, defeated former Mastermind and University Challenge – The Professionals contestant Kathryn Johnson 2–1 in the final round. James won three head-to-heads to Kathryn's two.

Match Four: Andy Kelly v. Dr Ian Bayley: Andy Kelly, a regular on quiz shows over the last 15 years, was defeated by former British Quiz Champion, Dr Ian Bayley. Dr. Bayley won all 5 head-to-head rounds before winning 4–2 in the final round.

Match Five: Sarah Lang v. Alan Morgan: Alan Morgan, winner of The People's Quiz Wildcard and a finalist in the National Lottery People's Quiz, defeated Sarah Lang, who was a million pound winner on PokerFace and also a winner on In It to Win It. Alan won all five head-to-head rounds and then went 4–1 in the final round for victory.

Match Six: David Edwards v. Dom Tait: David Edwards, the first male jackpot winner of Who Wants to Be a Millionaire?, defeated Dom Tait, a former University Challenge semifinalist. David won four head-to-head rounds to Dom's one before winning 4–3 in the final round.

Match Seven: Shanker Menon v. Isobel Williams: Shanker, a 2008 World Quizzing Championships competitor, beat Isobel Williams 7–6 in the first match to go to sudden death in the final round. Shanker had won 3 head-to-head rounds to Isobel's 2 in a closely fought battle. Isobel was the first contestant on the programme to have no previous quizzing experience.

Match Eight: Pete Dixon v. Barry Simmons: Barry Simmons, a former Mastermind and Brain of Britain contestant, defeated Pete Dixon, who has appeared on The Weakest Link and Fifteen to One. Barry, who has also played for the England quiz team, won four head-to-head rounds to Pete's one. Pete made one mistake in the last round and lost 5–3.

Match Nine: Val Edmondson v. Pat Gibson: Pat Gibson, a winner on Who Wants to Be a Millionaire?, Mastermind and Brain of Britain, came through his first round match with experienced quizzer Val Edmondson, who appeared on quiz shows Top of the Form and Double Your Money in the 1950s and 1960s. Pat won 4 head-to-head rounds to Val's 1 to have the advantage in the final and won 4–3 in that round.

Match Ten: Said Khan v. Jan Crompton: Jan Crompton, who is primarily a quiz question setter and researcher, defeated Said Khan. The head-to-head rounds saw Jan winning 3 to Said's 2 to take a slight advantage into the final round, which Jan won 5–3.

Match Eleven: Diane Hallagan v. Rob Hannah: Rob Hannah, a question setter, became the first contestant on Are you an Egghead? to win despite his opponent winning more of the head-to-head rounds. Diane, who has appeared on many quizzes, including Who Wants to Be a Millionaire?, won 4 head-to-heads to Rob's 1 but Rob won 5–4 in the last round.

Match Twelve: Mark Kerr v. Steve Clark: Mark Kerr defeated Steve Clark again after the eventual loser had won more head-to-head rounds. Mark, who is 'Britain's Brainiest Estate Agent' and a former Mastermind finalist, lost out in the head-to-head rounds by 3–2 to Steve, who also won a section of Britain's Brainiest but for Nurses. However, Mark came back to win 3–1 in the final round.

Match Thirteen: Shaun Wallace v. Rob Swarbrick: Shaun Wallace, the 2004 winner of Mastermind, came through a close contest with Duel winner Rob Swarbrick to win 7–6 in the final round. Despite Rob winning 3 head-to-heads to Shaun's 2, Rob required all his eggheads in the final round to get the score to 6–6 before eventually slipping up on a question.

Match Fourteen: Danielle Cartwright v. Olav Bjortomt: Olav Bjortomt, a regular on the quiz circuit and former World Quiz Champion, defeated Danielle Cartwright in a close contest. Danielle, who is one of the few contestants in the series to come in with no previous quizzing credentials, put up a strong fight before narrowly being edged out 3–2 in the head-to-heads and 4–3 in the final round.

Match Fifteen: Sophie Good v. Terry Toomey: Sophie Good, who is a teacher, was defeated by Terry Toomey, who has been a contestant on The Weakest Link and Fifteen to One. Terry won four head-to-heads to Sophie's one before winning 4–3 in the final round.

Match Sixteen: Harold Wyber v. Mark Leete: Harold Wyber, a University Challenge winner with Warwick in 2006–07, was defeated by Mark Leete, who has appeared on Pass the Buck and Payday, despite winning more of the head-to-head rounds. Harold won 3 head-to-heads to Mark's 2, but was beaten 4–3 in the final round with one slip up proving costly.

==== Last 16 ====
Match One: David Rainford v. Jenny Ryan: David Rainford defeated Jenny Ryan in the first of the second round matches. David won 3 head-to-head rounds to Jenny's 2 before David completed the job 4–3 in the final round using his Eggheads to better effect.

Match Two: James Webb v. Dr. Ian Bayley: James Webb caused a shock to knock out seasoned quizzer Ian Bayley. Dr. Bayley won 3 head-to-heads to James' 2. However Dr. Bayley, surprisingly, slipped up on 2 consecutive questions in the final round and James answered his 4 correctly to win 4–2.

Match Three: Alan Morgan v. David Edwards: Alan Morgan defeated David Edwards in a contest that was neck and neck all the way. Alan won 3 head-to-heads to David's 2 and with the final round level at 3–3 David slipped up on his final 2 questions to hand the advantage to Alan who won 4–3.

Match Four: Shanker Menon v. Barry Simmons: In another close contest, Barry Simmons defeated Shanker Menon. Barry won 3 head-to-heads to Shanker's 2 before Barry used his Eggheads to better effect in the final round. With Barry 2–1 up, Shanker made the mistake that would cost him the game, when asked which quotation Napoleon had made when referring to not interrupting his enemies, Shanker believed it was 'Planning Revenge' even when Daphne had suggested it was 'Making a Mistake'. Barry went on to win 4–2.

Match Five: Pat Gibson v. Jan Crompton: Pat Gibson looked in fine form as he dispatched Jan Crompton. Pat won all 5 head–to–head rounds and although Jan put up a strong fight in the final round and took the game to sudden death Pat prevailed 6–5.

Match Six: Rob Hannah v. Mark Kerr: Mark Kerr defeated Rob Hannah in a close final round. Rob again lost the majority of the head-to-heads 4–1. However, like his previous encounter, he appeared to be heading for victory when Mark answered his third question wrong in the final, but Mark fought back to win 7–6 and claim a place in the quarter-finals.

Match Seven: Shaun Wallace v. Olav Bjortomt: Olav Bjortomt was beaten by Shaun Wallace in a surprise defeat. Olav won 4 head-to-heads to Shaun's 1. However, he slipped up in the final round when not taking Chris's advice on the question 'On which river are the sailing vessels Nuggers used?' Olav incorrectly chose the Indus, whereas the answer was the Nile. This allowed Shaun to complete a 5–4 victory when he answered his fifth question correctly.

Match Eight: Mark Leete v. Terry Toomey: Terry Toomey beat Mark Leete in the final last 16 encounter. Terry took the head-to-head rounds 3–2 before one slip up from Mark in the final round proved enough for a 5–4 victory.

==== Quarter-finals ====
Match One: David Rainford v. James Webb: David Rainford ended James Webb's run in the competition after coming from behind in the final round. James had led 2–1 in the final round before David fought back to claim a 4–3 victory. Earlier David had won 3 head-to-heads to James' 2.

Match Two: Alan Morgan v. Barry Simmons: Barry Simmons despatched Alan Morgan to make the semifinals. Barry won all five head-to-head rounds and looked as though he would complete a comfortable win when Alan made an early slip up in the final. However, Barry made a mistake on a question too thus taking the contest into sudden death. Alan's lack of Eggheads though came back to haunt him and Barry scraped home 5–4.

Match Three: Pat Gibson v. Mark Kerr: Mark Kerr beat Pat Gibson in a close contest to move into the semifinals. Mark won 3 head-to-heads to Pat's 2 before the final round went all the way to sudden death. 1 incorrect answer from Pat proved crucial and Mark won 6–5.

Match Four: Shaun Wallace v. Terry Toomey: Shaun Wallace set up a semifinal with Mark Kerr after coming through a match with Terry Toomey. Shaun took the head-to-head rounds 4–1 before completing the job 5–3 in the final round.

==== Semifinals ====
Match One: David Rainford v. Barry Simmons: Barry came from behind after the head-to-head rounds to book his place in the final. Dave had won 3 to Barry's 2 but one slip up in the final round from David and with Barry going first saw him win 5–3.

Match Two: Mark Kerr v. Shaun Wallace: Shaun eventually prevailed over Mark in the longest game of the competition before the final. Trailing 3–2 to Mark from the head-to-heads, the match went all the way to sudden death before Shaun finally won 8–7 to move into the final.

==== Final ====
The final of Are you an Egghead?: Barry Simmons v. Shaun Wallace: In the final, Barry Simmons came back against all the odds to claim his place as the sixth Egghead. However, during the head-to-head rounds it looked anything but, as Shaun took the first 3 on Music, Geography and Arts and Books to assure he would have the advantage in the final round. It was the fourth head-to-head before Shaun even got an answer wrong, Barry finally winning at Science. Shaun eventually took a 4–1 lead into the final round as he completed the head-to-heads with a win on Sport. With 10 points needed to win the contest, an extraordinary turnaround saw Barry fight back from his deficit to win the match. Shaun went from having answered only one question wrongly in the head-to-heads to getting his first eight in the final wrong. Barry, on the other hand, stormed ahead to lead 8–4 before Shaun finally answered a question correctly, coming back to 9–6. Barry though was not to be denied and completed a 10–6 victory and thus a place on the "Most Feared Quiz Team in the Country!"

==== Structure ====
Tournament overview with score in the final, followed by head-to-head victories in brackets.

Round 1
Stephanie Bruce	3(1)
David Rainford	5(4)
Jenny Ryan	5(3)
Mark Labbett	3(2)
Kathryn Johnson	1(2)
James Webb	2(3)
Andy Kelly	2(0)
Dr Ian Bayley	4(5)
Sarah Lang	1(0)
Alan Morgan	4(5)
David Edwards	4(4)
Dom Tait	3(1)
Shanker Menon	7(3)
Isobel Williams	6(2)
Pete Dixon	3(1)
Barry Simmons	5(4)
Val Edmondson	3(1)
Pat Gibson	4(4)
Said Khan	3(2)
Jan Crompton	5(3)
Diane Hallagan	4(4)
Rob Hannah	5(1)
Mark Kerr	3(2)
Steve Clark	1(3)
Shaun Wallace	7(2)
Rob Swarbrick	6(3)
Danielle Cartwright	3(2)
Olav Bjortomt	4(3)
Sophie Good	3(1)
Terry Toomey	4(4)
Harold Wyber	3(3)
Mark Leete	4(2)

Round 2
David Rainford	4(3)
Jenny Ryan	3(2)
James Webb	4(2)
Dr Ian Bayley	2(3)
Alan Morgan	4(3)
David Edwards	3(2)
Shanker Menon	2(2)
Barry Simmons	4(3)
Pat Gibson	6(5)
Jan Crompton	5(0)
Rob Hannah	6(1)
Mark Kerr	7(4)
Shaun Wallace	5(1)
Olav Bjortomt	4(4)
Terry Toomey	5(3)
Mark Leete	4(2)

Quarter-Finals
David Rainford	4(3)
James Webb	3(2)
Alan Morgan	4(0)
Barry Simmons	5(5)
Pat Gibson	5(2)
Mark Kerr	6(3)
Shaun Wallace	5(4)
Terry Toomey	3(1)

Semi-Finals
David Rainford	3(3)
Barry Simmons	5(2)
Mark Kerr	7(3)
Shaun Wallace	8(2)

Final
Barry Simmons	10(1)
Shaun Wallace	6(4)

=== Series 2 ===
==== Last 32 ====
Match One: Gary Grant v. Julia Hobbs: Julia, who has set questions on quiz shows, such as Going for Gold seemed to be breezing through to the last 16 against Gary Grant, a finalist on The Weakest Link and a future Mastermind series champion, taking 4 Eggheads into the final round, but after Chris let her down on the final multiple choice question, Gary won in sudden death.

Match Two: Pam Thomas v. Chris Young: Pam, winner of the first series of A Question of Genius took on Chris, whose exploits included being involved in a University Challenge team with the highest winning margin in their series. Chris seemed to be making it a one-sided affair, despite Pam's amazing Lazarus-esque comeback in the Sport round, but despite both players messing up on their first General Knowledge question, Daphne's advice gave Chris the win.

Match Three: Nic Paul v. Charles Mosley: Nic, a £32,000 winner on Who Wants to Be a Millionaire? was brushed to one side by Charles, a veteran of University Challenge. Although, despite having 4 Eggheads, Charles gave 2 wrong answers, but Nic's risky strategy of saving Kevin for a more difficult question failed to pay off as when Kevin was called, the answer given was incorrect.

Match Four: Beth Maclure v. Shanker Menon: Shanker, beaten by Barry in Series 1 of Are You an Egghead? took on Beth, who was in a team on the very first series of Eggheads. After the head-to-heads, Beth had 3 Eggheads to Shanker's 2, but her inability to use them for their appropriate questions led her to getting 4 questions wrong, giving Shanker the win.

Match Five: Rob Huxley v. Paul Sinha: In one of the most amazing comebacks in the show's history, Rob, whose only previous experience in TV game shows was an appearance on Busman's Holiday in the 1990s, beat the more experienced Paul, despite the fact that Paul had all 5 Eggheads available to him. Paul's downfall came in 2 questions which none of the 4 Eggheads he asked advice for knew the answer, giving Rob an unlikely 2–1 win.

Match Six: Cathy Gillespie v. Pat Gibson: Pat, back after his quarter-final appearance in the last series took on Cathy, whose Mastermind experience made it a tough match. However, wasting both her Eggheads on her first question gave the tie to Pat, who didn't require the help of any of his Eggheads.

Match Seven: Jim Eccleston v. Liz Heron: A close match up between 2 heavyweights of the quiz world. Faults by the Eggheads on some of the General Knowledge round led to Liz winning on a question in which her and CJ's guesses were thrown out of the window.

Match Eight: Barbara Thompson v. Mark Kerr: Mark, semifinalist from Series 1 took on former Brain of Britain Barbara in a game which was closely fought until Mark took full control in General Knowledge, getting all 4 of his questions correctly after Barbara stumbled on a couple of questions.

Match Nine: Jenny Ryan v. Ken Owen: A battle of 2 quiz goliaths saw Jenny beating Ken thanks mainly of Ken's use of the Eggheads on the wrong questions.

Match Ten: Melanie Beaumont v. Anne Hegerty: In another close battle, Anne's strategy of going second in every round, combined with Chris (Melanie's only Egghead) unable to help Melanie, Anne managed to win with ease in the end.

Match Eleven: David Clark v. Peter Ediss: A to-and-fro match between David, a former Mastermind champion, and Peter, who won £32,000 on Who Wants to Be a Millionaire?, went smoothly, but better guessing from David proved to be crucial.

Match Twelve: Olav Bjortomt v. Gill Woon: Olav (who lost to runner-up Shaun Wallace in Series 1)'s strategy of going second in every round proved to be his winning formula and got him a 4–2 win and even using 3 Eggheads on his final question.

Match Thirteen: Jan Crompton v. Alan Crompton: A sibling rivalry brewed as brother and sister Alan and Jan took part in this one. After each getting all their first 4 questions correctly, Alan went against Kevin and despite Chris only being 15% sure of his answer, Jan gave his answer which won her the tie.

Match Fourteen: David Rainford v. Isabel Morgan: David, back after losing to Barry in Series 1's semifinals totally dominated Isabel, but then a close head-to-head, in which both players got 1 multiple-choice question wrong, was eventually decided after Isabel got her first sudden death question wrong.

Match Fifteen: Amy Godel v. Rupy Jedon: A close fought match took place between these 2 contestants, but hesitation and his use of Eggheads on questions which they struggled on cost Rupy the match.

Match Sixteen: David Edwards v. Alan Gibbs: David, back on for a second time, found the going hard during the head-to-heads, despite obtaining an Egghead advantage, but despite CJ's fumble on a question, he got through to the last 16.

==== Last 16 ====
Match One: Gary Grant v. Chris Young: As in his first match, Gary yet again showed his amazing recovery skills in his match against Chris. Totally outclassed in the head-to-heads, in which he also gave 9 incorrect answers in a row. However, a fatal mistake on Chris' first question gave Gary all the room he needed to win through to the quarter-finals.

Match Two: Charles Mosley v. Shanker Menon: Despite Shanker's overwhelming advantage going into General Knowledge, Charles more than held his own, only losing out in the second sudden death question.

Match Three: Rob Huxley v. Pat Gibson: In a one-sided match, Pat, despite losing the first head-to-head, was in imperious form. He totally outclassed Rob, whose main mistake was probably picking CJ, when he had the full choice of Eggheads, as he didn't use him in any of his 3 General Knowledge questions.

Match Four: Liz Heron v. Mark Kerr: Mark was on good form in this second round match. With Liz wasting Chris, her only Egghead, Mark wisely used 3 of his Eggheads to help him win through to the quarter-finals.

Match Five: Jenny Ryan v. Anne Hegerty: Anne carried on using her tactic of going second in every round and her only question she got wrong in the head-to-heads cost her having all 5 Eggheads. Nevertheless, she managed to beat Jenny after only answering 3 questions in General Knowledge.

Match Six: David Clark v. Olav Bjortomt: In a titanic battle between David & Olav, pressure mounted on Olav in the final round, when he went against his instinct on the first question and against Judith's original judgement, which gave David his hard earned win.

Match Seven: Jan Crompton v. David Rainford: In the head-to-heads, David managed to get the upper hand on Jan, although Jan got Kevin after winning the first one. With the help of their Eggheads, the General Knowledge round finished 5–5 after the multiple choice questions, but Jan stumbled in sudden death giving David the win.

Match Eight: Amy Godel v. David Edwards: In another close game, Amy and David provided tough opposition for each other until Chris let Amy down in General Knowledge leaving David, with the help of Kevin to get through to the next round.

==== Quarter-finals ====
Match One: Gary Grant v. Shanker Menon: Gary once again proved that having more Eggheads doesn't guarantee a win. After losing the first 3 head-to-heads, Gary got back in to take the final 2, before managing to beat Shanker in sudden death.

Match Two: Pat Gibson v. Mark Kerr: Pat Gibson, a former World Quiz Champion, takes on Mark Kerr; Pat's phone-a-friend when he won Who Wants to Be a Millionaire?. As in Series 1, these met in the quarter-final, in what was the closest result ever in Are You an Egghead? history. Despite having only 1 Egghead, Mark managed to get all 5 answers correct in General Knowledge and after 2 more were correctly answered each, Mark fell at the 8th question, giving Pat the game.

Match Three: Anne Hegerty v. David Clark: Another tight match in which only one fatal slip-up in General Knowledge by David, gave Anne the win.

Match Four: David Rainford v. David Edwards: In the battle of the Davids, David R.'s mistake on a ship question gave David E. the chance to win, which he took.

==== Semifinals ====
Match One: Gary Grant v. Pat Gibson: Pat managed to brush aside Gary in the first semifinal with relative ease, getting all 5 of his General Knowledge questions without using all his Eggheads.

Match Two: Anne Hegerty v. David Edwards: Despite having 4 Eggheads, Anne sensationally collapsed in General Knowledge, wasting 2 Eggheads and giving a wrong answer on the first question, before getting another one wrong, making it easy for David.

==== Final ====
The final of Are you an Egghead?: Pat Gibson v. David Edwards: The final seemed to be going Pat's way early on, after winning all 5 head-to-heads, giving him a 5–0 lead in the final round. It looked even more certain after David got one wrong to go 8–1 up. But, then after failing to get a question wrong all game, Pat was suddenly stuck on 8, while David made a miraculous recovery to get the score to 8–7, but then Pat found another gear going to 9–7, then after David got another question wrong, he wrapped up proceedings to win 10–7 to become the 7th member of the "Most Feared Quiz Team in the Country!"

==== Structure ====
Tournament overview with score in the final, followed by head-to-head victories in brackets.

Round 1
Gary Grant	4(1)
Julia Hobbs	3(4)
Pam Thomas	3(2)
Chris Young	4(3)
Nic Paul	1(1)
Charles Mosley	3(4)
Beth Maclure	1(3)
Shanker Menon	2(2)
Rob Huxley	2(0)
Paul Sinha	1(5)
Cathy Gillespie	1(2)
Pat Gibson	3(3)
Jim Eccleston	3(2)
Liz Heron	4(3)
Barbara Thompson	2(2)
Mark Kerr	4(3)
Jenny Ryan	4(3)
Ken Owen	2(2)
Melanie Beaumont	2(1)
Anne Hegerty	4(4)
David Clark	4(3)
Peter Ediss	2(2)
Olav Bjortomt	4(4)
Gill Woon	2(1)
Jan Crompton	5(2)
Alan Crompton	4(3)
David Rainford	5(5)
Isabel Morgan	4(0)
Amy Godel	4(2)
Rupy Jedon	1(3)
David Edwards	4(3)
Alan Gibbs	2(2)

Round 2
Gary Grant	5(1)
Chris Young	4(4)
Charles Mosley	5(1)
Shanker Menon	6(4)
Rob Huxley	1(1)
Pat Gibson	4(4)
Liz Heron	2(1)
Mark Kerr	4(4)
Jenny Ryan	1(1)
Anne Hegerty	3(4)
David Clark	3(2)
Olav Bjortomt	2(3)
Jan Crompton	5(1)
David Rainford	6(4)
Amy Godel	3(3)
David Edwards	5(2)

Quarter-finals
Gary Grant	5(2)
Shanker Menon	4(3)
Pat Gibson	8(4)
Mark Kerr	7(1)
Anne Hegerty	5(3)
David Clark	4(2)
David Rainford	3(1)
David Edwards	5(4)

Semi-finals
Gary Grant	3(1)
Pat Gibson	5(4)
Anne Hegerty	1(4)
David Edwards	4(1)

Final
Pat Gibson	10(5)
David Edwards	7(0)
