= Eggheads (game show) =

British quiz show

- Genre: Quiz show
- Directed by: Suzanne Pearse
- Presented by: Dermot Murnaghan (2003–2014); Jeremy Vine (2008–2023)
- Starring: Eggheads: Kevin Ashman (2003–2023); Daphne Fowler (2003–2014); CJ de Mooi (2003–2012, 2014–2016); Chris Hughes (2003–2023); Judith Keppel (2003–2022, 2023); Barry Simmons (2008–2023); Pat Gibson (2009–2023); David Rainford (2012–2018); Lisa Thiel (2014–2023); Steve Cooke (2016–2023); Beth Webster (2016–2023); Olav Bjortomt (2021–2023)
- Country of origin: United Kingdom
- Original language: English
- No. of series: 20 (regular); 8 (celebrity)
- No. of episodes: 1870 (regular); 92 (celebrity)

Production
- Executive producers: Andy Culpin; Rob Dean
- Running time: 30 minutes
- Production companies: 12 Yard; BBC Scotland (2010–2020)

Original release
- Network: BBC One (2003–2004); BBC Two (2005–2020); Channel 5 (2021–2023)
- Release: 10 November 2003 – 26 April 2023

Related
- Are You an Egghead?; Revenge of the Egghead; Make Me an Egghead

Eggheads is a British quiz show produced by 12 Yard. It was first broadcast in November 2003 chaired by Dermot Murnaghan. In 2008, Jeremy Vine became joint chair, and subsequently sole chair. The show has inspired three spinoff series: Are You an Egghead? (2008), Revenge of the Egghead (2014) and Make Me an Egghead (2016). There have also been episodes of the regular series featuring teams of celebrities in their own short series, with their own rolling prize fund.

== History ==
The show began in 2003 with Dermot Murnaghan as the presenter. From 2008, Jeremy Vine presented when Murnaghan was hosting the spinoff series. After the spin-off show finished, Murnaghan and Vine continued to host the series on a rotational basis, with Murnaghan typically hosting the first half of each series and Vine taking over for the second half. From series 16, Vine became the sole presenter.

The series originally broadcast on BBC One at lunchtime beginning in November 2003, and later moved to a primetime slot on BBC Two from 2005 to 2020.

On 31 December 2016, the quiz made a brief cameo in BBC One’s Peter Pan Goes Wrong TV special.

On 12 March 2021, after a year's hiatus during the COVID-19 pandemic, it was announced on Jeremy Vine's titular Channel 5 programme that the quiz show would be moving to Channel 5 with Vine and the most recent Eggheads returning. The new series premiered on 4 October 2021, and alongside a studio change, only four Eggheads and four contestants now played at a time with a reduction to three one-on-one rounds to accommodate advert breaks (due to Channel 5's status as a commercial broadcaster). Due to social distancing restrictions, the desks were lengthened and perspex screens were added. The first challengers, playing for charity, were Jay's Virtual Quiz, who had become a fundraising hit on social media during the pandemic. An additional Egghead (Olav Bjortomt) was featured on the opening credits and competed from week two.

== Format ==
In each episode, a team of five quiz and game show champions (the Eggheads) is challenged by a team of five contestants for prize money. If the challengers lose, then £1,000 is added to the prize money fund until the Eggheads are beaten, when the prize will revert to £1,000. The most prize money that has been won is £75,000, in 2007.

Some teams have been reduced to one contestant for the final round, but have still beaten five Eggheads. Occasionally, one remaining Egghead will beat five challengers. Only once have the Eggheads lost four games in succession and only four times has a team of all five challengers won the final round. Since 2021, it has been four Eggheads against four challengers, instead of the previous five.

=== Rounds ===
The show is played in five rounds. The first four 'one-on-one' 'elimination' rounds each focus on one subject category (of nine) while the final 'conferring' round tests general knowledge. In the first four rounds, the challengers choose a member of their own team to play, and an Egghead against whom they wish to compete. The players for that round then leave the studio to go into the "Question Room". The challenger is given the choice of going first or second. Both players are asked in turn three multiple-choice questions. If there is no winner, the round goes into sudden death with no choices given for answers. Since the show moved to Channel 5, there have only been four players per team, and thus only three 'one-on-one' rounds.

The player who wins each round earns a place in the final round, while losing players are eliminated from the game.

The final general knowledge round is then played between non-eliminated Eggheads and challengers with a similar question format to the previous rounds, with the exception that if more than one remains on a team they may confer. If the challengers win they take the prize money; if the Eggheads win, the prize money is increased by £1,000 for the next quiz.

=== Subjects ===
There are nine possible subjects for the first rounds. They are:

- Arts & Books (2003–2023)
- Entertainment (2003–2008)
- Film & Television (2008–2023)
- Food & Drink (2003–2023)
- Geography (2003–2023)
- History (2003–2023)
- Music (2008–2023)
- Politics (2003–2023)
- Science (2003–2023)
- Sport (2003–2023)

Music and Film & Television were introduced in Autumn 2008 through a split of the Entertainment category. Subjects can appear in any order, although at least one of Sport, Music or Film & Television will appear in every episode. Despite the splitting of the Entertainment category, Music and Film & Television can appear in the same episode, sometimes consecutively.

== "Eggheads" ==
In the first eight series, the team consisted of only five Eggheads who each appeared in every episode and did not rotate. At the end of 2008, a sixth Egghead was added and appearances rotated. From series 15, five of eight possible Eggheads appeared in each episode, and later in 2016, two Eggheads joined the panel after a spin-off series entitled Make Me an Egghead. At the conclusion of the last series, there were seven Eggheads: Kevin Ashman, Barry Simmons, Pat Gibson, Steve Cooke, Olav Bjortomt, Lisa Thiel and Beth Webster.

=== Original Eggheads ===
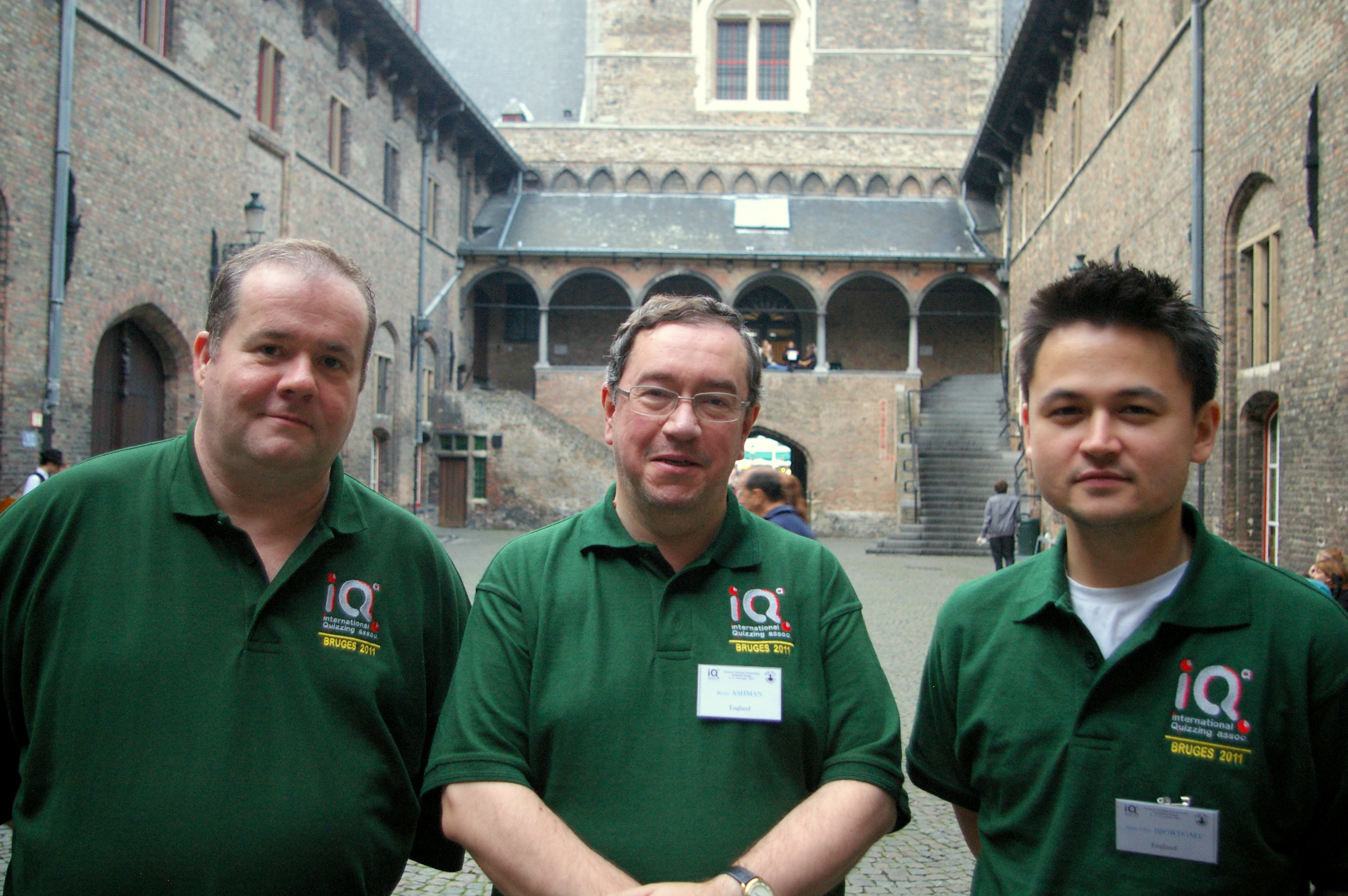
Pat Gibson, Kevin Ashman, and Olav Bjortomt

- Kevin Ashman (2003–2023) is the eight-time winner of the British Quiz Championship, the winner of the third series of Fifteen to One in 1989, the 1995 Mastermind (including all-time record score), the 1996 Brain of Britain (including all-time record score), its 3-yearly Brain of Brains and 9-yearly Top Brain in 1998, the Fifteen to One: Millenium Edition in 1999, the thirteen time Brain of London winner, the twice Gold Medallist for quizzing at the Mind Sports Olympiad, the two time Master Brain, and the winner of Sale of the Century, Quiz Night, Trivial Pursuit and The Great British Quiz. After joining Eggheads, he won six European Quizzing Championships and six World Quizzing Championships as well as being the Captain of the England quiz team and being ranked the number one quizzer in the world.
- CJ de Mooi (2003–2012, Revenge of the Egghead (2014), 2014–2016) won the original The Weakest Link Bad Loser Special in 2000,100% in 2001, Beat the Nation in 2002 and Fifteen to One. He is also a Mensa chess champion. He took a break from the show from August 2012 until May 2014. His last appearance on his first run on the show was on 31 August 2012 during Series 13. He was the sole Egghead on Revenge of the Egghead, which aired on BBC Two in 2014. In May 2016, he confirmed on Twitter that he was leaving the show again to pursue an acting career in South Africa.
- Daphne Fowler (2003–2014) won Going for Gold in 1988, Brain of Britain in 1997 and two series of Fifteen to One in 2001 (including second highest score, for which she answered every question in the final round correctly). She has now retired from Eggheads, with her last appearance being in May 2014. She was replaced in the team by returning Egghead CJ de Mooi.
- Judith Keppel (2003–2022) was the first British winner of £1,000,000 on Who Wants to Be a Millionaire? in 2000. On 10 October 2022, Judith announced her retirement from the show. On 22 March 2023, she returned to celebrate the show's 2000th episode.
- Chris Hughes (2003–2023) won £100 on The Sky's the Limit in the 1970s, Top of the World in 1982, Mastermind and International Mastermind in 1983 and participated on The Weakest Link in 2001 where despite answering every question correctly, was the last contestant voted off. After joining Eggheads, he won Brain of Britain in 2005. In 2025, it was reported that Hughes had died.

=== Later additions ===
- Barry Simmons (2008–2023) won £64,000 on Who Wants to Be a Millionaire? in 2005 and a semi-finalist on Mastermind. He joined Eggheads in 2008 after winning the first series of Are You an Egghead? beating in the final Shaun Wallace, who would become one of two original chasers in The Chase. After joining Eggheads, he won Brain of Britain in 2013 which garnered controversy amongst listeners. He is currently a member of the Scotland Quiz Team.
- Pat Gibson (2009–2023) was the fourth British winner of £1,000,000 on Who Wants to Be a Millionaire?, and the fifth recorded contestant to do so, in 2004, Mastermind in 2005 and Brain of Britain in 2006. He is a four-time winner (2007, 2010, 2014, 2015) of the British Quiz Championship, and a four-time winner (2007, 2010, 2011, 2013) of the World Quizzing Championships. He took part in Are You an Egghead? twice, losing in the quarter-finals to Mark Kerr in the first series in 2008, but winning the second series in 2009 beating David Edwards in the final to join the Eggheads. He also won Mastermind Champion of Champions in 2010. He has amassed 21 international quizzing medals and was ranked the second strongest quizzer in the UK, behind Kevin Ashman.
- Dave Rainford (2012–2018) appeared on Remote Control in 1991 and won £250,000 on Who Wants To Be A Millionaire in 2005. He was a previous contestant on Are You An Egghead where he was a semi-finalist in the first series in 2008, losing to eventual winner Barry Simmons, and a quarter-finalist in the second series in 2009, losing to David Edwards. He replaced CJ de Mooi. He earned himself the nickname "Tremendous Knowledge Dave". On 7 March 2020, it was reported that Rainford had died, after illness had prevented him appearing on the show since 2018.
- Lisa Thiel (2014–2023), a previous contestant on The Weakest Link in 2001 where she made the final but lost, The Chase in 2012 and part of a winning team on the Egghead's spinoff Revenge of the Egghead in 2014.
- Steve Cooke (2016–present), winner of the men's contest in Make Me an Egghead. He is a member of Mensa who previously won £12,900 on The People Versus in 2001.
- Beth Webster (2016–2023), winner of the women's contest in Make Me an Egghead. She is active on the Quizzing Grand Prix Circuit in the United Kingdom, and in The Quiz League of London. She was ranked as a "Sage" in the 2012 Order of Merit listings of the British Quiz Association.
- Olav Bjortomt (2021–2023), the four-time winner of the World Quizzing Championships, and a four-time European Quiz Champion. He is also a question setter for University Challenge and The Chase and has previously been a contestant on Are You an Egghead?

=== Graphical representation ===
This chart displays when each presenter and Egghead was active. The black bars denote the start of each series.

== Teams who have defeated the Eggheads ==
The highest amount any team has won to beat the Eggheads is £75,000 in 2007 (Series 8, Episode 14) by a team of Oxford Brookes University students, Beer Today, Gone Tomorrow.

Team name	Episode	Prize money	Cumulative (at end of each Series)	Notes
The Unicorn	Series 1, Episode 13	£13,000		
Follically Challenged	Series 1, Episode 15	£2,000		
Unlikely Lads	Series 1, Episode 21	£6,000	£21,000	
Streatham Massive	Series 2, Episode 11	£20,000		
Spaghetti	Series 2, Episode 30	£19,000	£60,000	
The Rotor Heads	Series 3, Episode 21	£21,000	£81,000	
Densa	Series 4, Episode 11	£20,000		
Wapping Black Sheep	Series 4, Episode 14	£3,000	£104,000	
Radio Ga Ga	Series 5, Episode 6	£17,000	£121,000	
Second Class	Series 6, Episode 3	£37,000		
Mancunian Candidates	Series 6, Episode 10	£7,000		
Russell's Raiders	Series 6, Episode 14	£4,000	£169,000	
West Yorkies	Series 7, Episode 18	£29,000		
Seville Servants	Series 7, Episode 19	£1,000	£199,000	#1 Eggheads lose twice in a row
Beer today, Gone tomorrow	Series 8, Episode 14	£75,000		Biggest win on the show so far
Preston Quizmasters	Series 8, Episode 17	£3,000		
Museum of London/Museum in Docklands	Series 8, Episode 50	£33,000		
Taxidermists	Series 8, Episode 51	£1,000		#2 Eggheads lose twice in a row
Blue Vibe	Series 8, Episode 63	£12,000		
Beer and Skittles	Series 8, Episode 68	£5,000	£328,000	
Weakly Players	Series 9, Episode 15	£27,000		
Sean and the Sheep	Series 9, Episode 35	£20,000		
Tap Heads	Series 9, Episode 48	£13,000		
The Rat Pack	Series 9, Episode 54	£5,000		Eggheads lose to a single opponent for the first time
Lads Wot Lunch	Series 9, Episode 65	£12,000		
South Wales Warriors	Series 9, Episode 70	£5,000		
Loser's Corner	Series 9, Episode 76	£6,000		
Meet your Waterloo	Series 9, Episode 83	£7,000		#2 Eggheads lose to a single opponent
Flexi Funksters	Series 9, Episode 99	£16,000		#3 Eggheads lose to a single opponent
Cubbington Players	Series 9, Episode 112	£13,000		
Act One	Series 9, Episode 120	£8,000		Final team to play (and defeat) the original set of 5 Eggheads
Bere Heads	Series 9, Episode 145	£25,000		
The Abbey Revellers	Series 9, Episode 146	£1,000		#3 Eggheads lose twice in a row
The Bald & The Beautiful	Series 9, Episode 152	£6,000		
Eclectic Mix	Series 9, Episode 159	£7,000	£499,000	
The Oxford Imps	Series 10, Episode 2	£3,000		Contained a pre-fame appearance of Rachel Parris
Chummie Brummies	Series 10, Episode 31	£29,000		
One Sense Less	Series 10, Episode 54	£23,000		
The Midweek Marauders	Series 10, Episode 64	£10,000		
Beached Boys	Series 10, Episode 66	£2,000		
Sally Warboys	Series 10, Episode 69	£3,000		
The Hanging Gale	Series 10, Episode 82	£13,000		
The Cartoonists	Series 10, Episode 91	£9,000		First full team of challengers to win the final round against single Egghead (Kevin)
Insight Radio	Series 10, Episode 92	£1,000		#4 Eggheads lose twice in a row & #4 Eggheads lose to a single opponent
Ocean's Five	Series 10, Episode 93	£1,000		#1 Eggheads lose three times in a row
Bognor Regis + 2	Series 10, Episode 94	£1,000		#1 Eggheads lose four times in a row
The Eggitors	Series 10, Episode 98	£4,000		
Pembroke Globetrotters	Series 10, Episode 115	£17,000		
PRS Plus	Series 10, Episode 121	£6,000	£621,000	
The Wise Owls	Series 11, Episode 3	£37,000		
Work I.T. Out	Series 11, Episode 5	£2,000		
Shabba	Series 11, Episode 35	£30,000		#5 Eggheads lose to a single opponent
The Black & White Stripes	Series 11, Episode 52	£17,000		
Loiners by Proxy	Series 11, Episode 57	£5,000		
The Middleton Moonrakers	Series 11, Episode 58	£1,000		#7 Eggheads lose twice in a row
Scrum 5	Series 11, Episode 72	£14,000		
Comedy of Errors	Series 11, Episode 75	£3,000		#6 Eggheads lose to a single opponent
Glamorgan Poppies	Series 11, Episode 86	£11,000		
The Apple Turnovers	Series 11, Episode 93	£7,000		
Get It With Letters	Series 11, Episode 122	£29,000		
Chessboxers	Series 11, Episode 124	£2,000		
The Flying Doctors	Series 11, Episode 130	£6,000		#7 Eggheads lose to a single opponent
Lancashire Hotpots	Series 11, Episode 141	£11,000		#8 Eggheads lose to a single opponent
Bar 5	Series 11, Episode 157	£16,000	£812,000	
Living by Numbers	Series 12, Episode 6	£9,000		
Culture Vultures	Series 12, Episode 24	£18,000		
Who Cares Wins	Series 12, Episode 38	£14,000		
The Internal Marketeers	Series 12, Episode 63	£25,000		
Chad Acad	Series 12, Episode 66	£3,000		
Cornish Monkeys	Series 12, Episode 72	£6,000		
Millennium Marvels	Series 12, Episode 84	£12,000		
Loose Connection	Series 12, Episode 85	£1,000		#8 Eggheads lose twice in a row
She Who Must Be Obeyed	Series 12, Episode 91	£6,000		
The Tramlines	Series 12, Episode 96	£5,000		
The Lions' Den	Series 12, Episode 97	£1,000		#9 Eggheads lose twice in a row
5 A Day	Series 12, Episode 124	£27,000		
Blackpool Rockers	Series 12, Episode 141	£17,000		
The Five Marketeers	Series 12, Episode 145	£4,000		#9 Eggheads lose to a single opponent
The Brocketeers	Series 12, Episode 149	£4,000	£964,000	
The Royal Harmonics	Series 13, Episode 12	£23,000		
Dobbin	Series 13, Episode 19	£7,000		
Shelford 5	Series 13, Episode 22	£3,000		
The Wonderyears	Series 13, Episode 30	£8,000		Over £1,000,000 has now been paid out in prize money since show first started.
Phoenix Nights	Series 13, Episode 37	£7,000		
The Bell Boys	Series 13, Episode 38	£1,000		#10 Eggheads lose twice in a row
A Tale of Two Families	Series 13, Episode 41	£3,000		
Bucks Quiz	Series 13, Episode 44	£3,000		
The Melting Pot	Series 13, Episode 47	£3,000		
Lightning Can Strike Twice	Series 13, Episode 53	£6,000		#10 Eggheads lose to a single opponent
The Family Connection	Series 13, Episode 65	£12,000		
Dad's Army	Series 13, Episode 83	£18,000		#11 Eggheads lose to a single opponent
The Hole in the Wall Gang	Series 13, Episode 85	£2,000		
UNOS	Series 13, Episode 89	£4,000		
The Quad Runners	Series 13, Episode 118	£29,000		#12 Eggheads lose to a single opponent
Handel with Care	Series 13, Episode 120	£2,000		
Team Scotia	Series 13, Episode 136	£16,000	£1,111,000	
Two and a Half Tandems	Series 14, Episode 22	£26,000		
Bright Sparks	Series 14, Episode 33	£11,000		
Streetwise	Series 14, Episode 49	£16,000		
The Business Men	Series 14, Episode 90	£41,000		2nd highest amount won by a challenging team. #13 Eggheads lose to a single opponent. 100th team to defeat the Eggheads.
The Crooked Spires	Series 14, Episode 95	£5,000		
The Clevelanders	Series 14, Episode 106	£11,000		
Beer Run Quizzers	Series 14, Episode 108	£2,000		
Doctors' Notes	Series 14, Episode 113	£5,000		
Business Belles	Series 14, Episode 119	£6,000		
No Direction	Series 14, Episode 130	£11,000		#14 Eggheads lose to a single opponent
Neither Big Nor Clever	Series 14, Episode 134	£4,000		
The Sensational Alex Fairley Band	Series 14, Episode 136	£2,000		#2 Eggheads get first 2 questions wrong in the final round. Has happened once before in Series 11, Episode 154.
Rambling Badgers	Series 14, Episode 139	£3,000	£1,254,000	
Green Giants	Series 15, Episode 12	£13,000		#2 Full team of challengers win the final round against a single Egghead (Judith)
The Amnesiacs	Series 15, Episode 17	£5,000		
The Hound Dogs	Series 15, Episode 20	£3,000		
Cardigan Carnage	Series 15, Episode 22	£2,000		
The Soroptimists	Series 15, Episode 31	£9,000		
Collegiate Quizzers	Series 15, Episode 44	£13,000		
Stumped	Series 15, Episode 53	£9,000		
Burns Baby Burns	Series 15, Episode 55	£2,000		
Meat Bingo	Series 15, Episode 69	£14,000		
Team 42	Series 15, Episode 70	£1,000		#11 Eggheads lose twice in a row
Cave Aged	Series 15, Episode 77	£7,000		
Shipmates	Series 15, Episode 81	£4,000	£1,336,000	
Quizzical	Series 16, Episode 6	£25,000		
The Courtiers	Series 16, Episode 19	£13,000		
Five Diamonds	Series 16, Episode 30	£11,000		
Capita Ovorum	Series 16, Episode 31	£1,000		#12 Eggheads lose twice in a row
Golden Girls	Series 16, Episode 36	£5,000		
The Baked Bean Tin	Series 16, Episode 46	£10,000		
Washy Posse	Series 16, Episode 49	£3,000		
Ducking and Diving	Series 16, Episode 57	£8,000		
The Lumberjacks	Series 16, Episode 59	£2,000		
Words in Action	Series 16, Episode 75	£16,000		
Bob's Buddies	Series 16, Episode 91	£16,000	£1,446,000	
A Clearer Head	Series 17, Episode 20	£29,000		
The Westenders	Series 17, Episode 29	£9,000		
Hayling Hackers	Series 17, Episode 34	£5,000		#15 Eggheads lose to a single opponent
Ludophiles	Series 17, Episode 37	£3,000		
The Simms Roaders	Series 17, Episode 48	£11,000		
The Criminal Element	Series 17, Episode 62	£14,000		Team consisting of crime writers Val McDermid, Mark Billingham, Chris Brookmyre, Martyn Waites & Doug Johnstone
We Quiz You Not	Series 17, Episode 70	£8,000		#16 Eggheads lose to a single opponent
Acorn Antiques	Series 17, Episode 85	£15,000		#17 Eggheads lose to a single opponent
He is Heavy, He's my Father	Series 17, Episode 95	£10,000	£1,550,000	#18 Eggheads lose to a single opponent
Rambling Away	Series 18, Episode 2	£7,000		
Harwell and the Dekatrons	Series 18, Episode 6	£4,000		
Peter's Griffin	Series 18, Episode 10	£4,000		
Soft Boiled	Series 18, Episode 15	£5,000		#19 Eggheads lose to a single opponent
2Morrows' People	Series 18, Episode 33	£18,000		
T'Villidge Fowk	Series 18, Episode 39	£6,000		
Abide With Us	Series 18, Episode 40	£1,000		#13 Eggheads lose twice in a row
Top Spinners	Series 18, Episode 43	£3,000		#20 Eggheads lose to a single opponent
Queen Bee's Cs	Series 18, Episode 61	£18,000		150th team to defeat the Eggheads
Cabbies	Series 18, Episode 62	£1,000	£1,617,000	#14 Eggheads lose twice in a row & #3 Eggheads get first 2 questions wrong in the final round
Old Dorks	Series 19, Episode 3	£26,000		
Knights Templeman	Series 19, Episode 8	£5,000		
The Barrycudas	Series 19, Episode 14	£6,000		
All Saints	Series 19, Episode 36	£22,000		
Compulsory Mantis Shrimp	Series 19, Episode 38	£2,000		
Burnley is Babylon	Series 19, Episode 42	£4,000		
Tasselled Wobbegongs	Series 19, Episode 52	£10,000		
The Great Grandsons	Series 19, Episode 69	£17,000		
Gli Italiani	Series 19, Episode 70	£1,000		#15 Eggheads lose twice in a row
Suspicious Looking Sausages	Series 19, Episode 73	£3,000		
Percies	Series 19, Episode 86	£13,000	£1,726,000	
Doing it for the Craic	Series 20, Episode 13	£22,000		
Give us a T!	Series 20, Episode 20	£7,000		#21 Eggheads lose to a single opponent
Pat's People	Series 20, Episode 24	£4,000		#3 Full team of challengers win the final round against a single Egghead (Lisa)
Team 4x4	Series 20, Episode 50	£26,000		
Eclection	Series 20, Episode 58	£8,000		#22 Eggheads lose to a single opponent
Always Game	Series 20, Episode 70	£12,000		
Shotley Open Spacers	Series 20, Episode 81	£11,000		#4 Full team of challengers win the final round against a single Egghead (Lisa)
Grout Expectations	Series 20, Episode 91	£10,000		
The Stockport Hatters	Series 20, Episode 95	£4,000	£1,830,000	
Think Outside the Box	Series 21, Episode 3	£3,000		
Phil's Phab Phive	Series 21, Episode 16	£13,000		
The Gomersal Westenders	Series 21, Episode 21	£5,000	£1,851,000	£19,000 went unclaimed at the end of the series 21, with the prize fund being reset back to £1,000 for the move to Channel 5.
Midlife Crisis	Series 22, Episode 4	£4,000		1st team to defeat the Eggheads on Channel 5.
The Four Racketeers	Series 22, Episode 32	£28,000		
Chopsus Bebes	Series 22, Episode 33	£1,000	£1,884,000	#16 Eggheads lose twice in a row
Barron Healy Quartet	Series 23, Episode 2	£9,000		
Rota Madmen	Series 23, Episode 5	£3,000		
Sandy Shores	Series 23, Episode 8	£3,000		#23 Eggheads lose to a single opponent
Scum of the Earth	Series 23, Episode 19	£11,000		
Barb On Tour	Series 23, Episode 22	£3,000		
Thorpe Thinkers	Series 23, Episode 27	£5,000		
Motley Crew	Series 23, Episode 30	£3,000		
Thrown Together	Series 23, Episode 54	£24,000	£1,945,000	
Couples' Therapy	Series 24, Episode 32	£33,000		Largest win on Channel 5
Greek Geekers	Series 24, Episode 45	£13,000		#5 Full team of challengers win the final round against a single Egghead (Pat)
Scramblers	Series 24, Episode 51	£6,000	£1,997,000	

== Transmissions ==
=== Regular editions ===
Series	Start date	End date	Episodes	
Series	Start date	End date	Series	Cumulative
1	10 November 2003	10 September 2004	30	30
2	13 September 2004	16 December 2004	30	60
3	23 May 2005	7 November 2005	30	90
4	8 November 2005	12 December 2005	25	115
5	10 April 2006	6 June 2006	40	155
6	25 September 2006	27 October 2006	25	180
7	5 March 2007	10 September 2007	80	260
8	11 September 2007	28 February 2008	80	340
9	29 February 2008	23 March 2009	160	500
10	24 March 2009	26 February 2010	155	655
11	1 March 2010	6 April 2011	160	815
12	7 April 2011	13 April 2012	160	975
13	16 April 2012	14 March 2013	140	1,115
14	9 April 2013	27 May 2014	140	1,255
15	28 May 2014	3 February 2015	100	1,355
16	4 February 2015	21 January 2016	100	1,455
17	22 January 2016	19 August 2016	100	1,555
18	26 September 2016	17 April 2017	85	1,640
19	18 April 2017	2 April 2018	95	1,735
20	3 April 2018	6 May 2019	95	1,830
21	7 May 2019	15 June 2020	40	1,870
22	4 October 2021	26 November 2021	40	1,910
23	21 February 2022	6 May 2022	55	1,965
24	10 October 2022	19 April 2023	55	2,020

=== Celebrity editions ===
Series	Start date	End date	Episodes	
Series	Start date	End date	Series	Cumulative
1	15 December 2008	19 December 2008	5	5
2	7 December 2009	12 March 2010	10	15
3	13 December 2010	24 December 2010	10	25
4	12 December 2011	23 December 2011	10	35
5	10 December 2012	21 December 2012	10	45
6	9 December 2013	20 December 2013	10	55
7	3 May 2017	2 June 2017	22	77
8	13 August 2018	31 August 2018	15	92
9	14 February 2022	18 February 2022	5	97
10	20 April 2023	26 April 2023	5	102

== Spin-offs ==
=== Are You an Egghead? ===
On 20 October 2008, a spin-off called Are You an Egghead? debuted on BBC Two. The first series was won by Barry Simmons and ran from 20 October to 2 December 2008 while the second series was won by Pat Gibson and ran from 12 October to 23 November 2009.

=== Revenge of the Egghead ===
On 24 February 2014, a new spin-off series of Eggheads was launched called Revenge of the Egghead. It was presented by Jeremy Vine and saw the return of CJ de Mooi, who left Eggheads in 2012. In each episode, de Mooi faced a team of five contestants hoping to win thousands of pounds. The series ran for a 6-week period, between 24 February and 4 April 2014. Lisa Thiel appeared on the show as part of a winning team before becoming an Egghead herself shortly afterwards.

==== Main game ====
Each contestant, in turn, is asked a general knowledge question. If their answer is right, £200 is added to the prize fund but if their answer is wrong and de Mooi knows their answer is wrong, he presses a red button in front of him to answer the same question. If he gets it wrong and the contestant gets it right, an additional £100 is added to the prize fund. If he gets it right, the contestant is asked a multiple-choice question by de Mooi. If they get it right, gameplay continues as normal but if they get it wrong, they lose one of their two lives. If a contestant loses both of their lives, they are out of the game. When time runs out, the surviving players move on to the final round, along with the total number of lives remaining for all players, for a chance to win an equal share of the prize fund.

==== Final round ====
The final round starts out with de Mooi answering ten general knowledge questions. The number of questions he gets right becomes the target that the team has to beat. The team can confer on every question. Every wrong answer means that the team loses one of their lives and if they lose all of their lives, they leave with nothing but if they beat the target, they win an equal share of the prize fund.

=== Make Me an Egghead ===
A 25-part spin-off series ran from 22 August to 23 September 2016, with the search for two new members for the Eggheads line-up: one male, one female. The series was won by Steve Cooke and Beth Webster.
