= Barry Simmons =

British TV personality

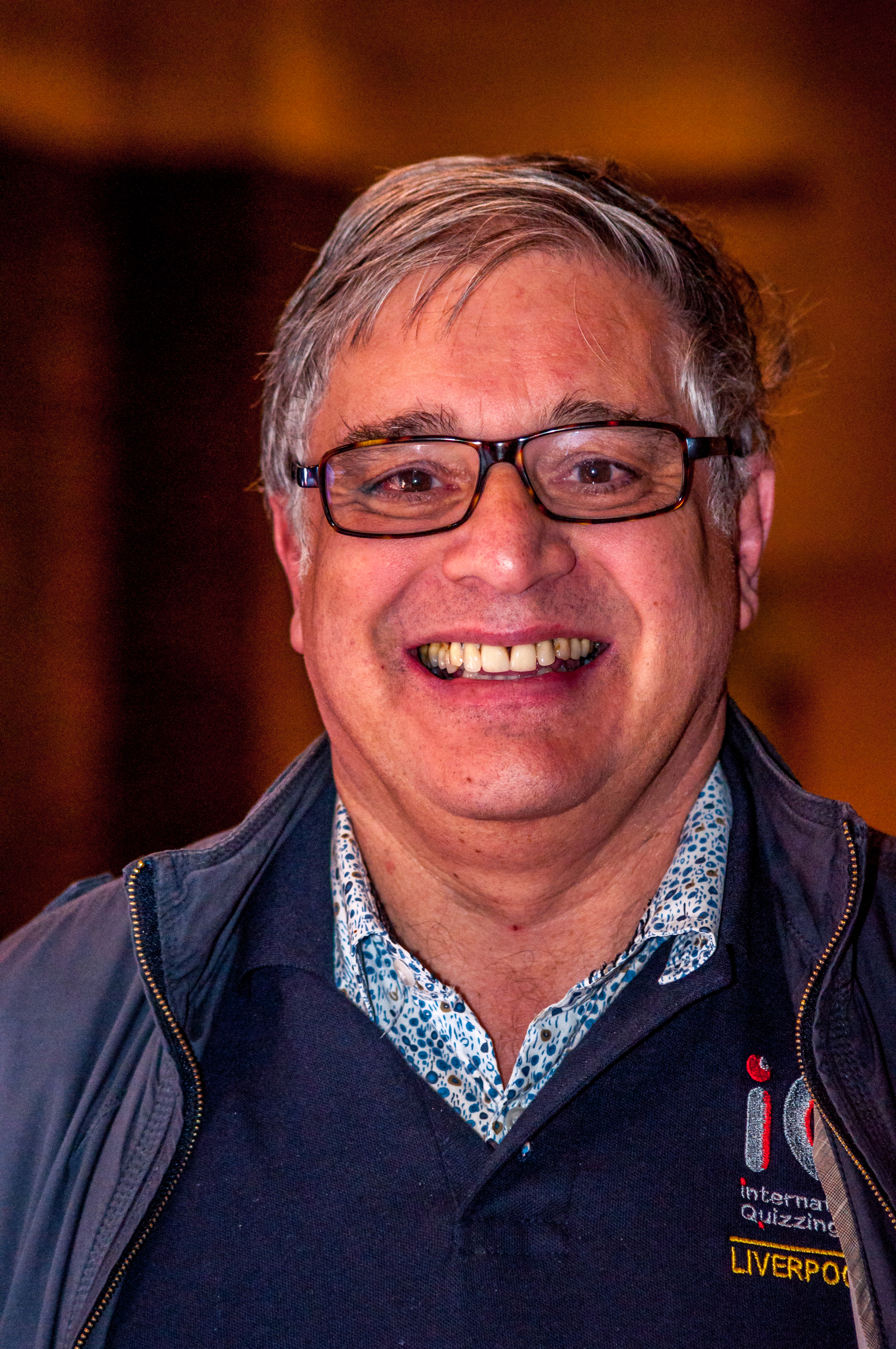
- Simmons in 2013
- Born: Barry Lawrence Simmons; 24 November 1948 (age 77); Edinburgh, Scotland
- Occupation: Game show contestant
- Spouse: Janet (m. 1976)
- Children: 2

Barry Lawrence Simmons (born 24 November 1948) is a Scottish quiz show contestant, the winner of the first BBC Two TV show Are You an Egghead?, and of Brain of Britain 2013. Simmons was born in Edinburgh and now lives in Leeds, West Yorkshire.

== Career ==
Before becoming an 'Egghead', Simmons won £64,000 on Who Wants to Be a Millionaire?, broadcast on 5 February 2005 (Series 17, Episode 6). He reached the hot seat on his 3rd attempt, having appeared as a fastest finger first contestant on two occasions during Series 15 in early 2004. One of these failed appearances (on 24 April 2004) featured Pat Gibson becoming the 4th UK winner of the £1,000,000 jackpot. Gibson would later join Simmons on Eggheads in 2009.

Alongside teammates and fellow former Who Wants to Be a Millionaire? contestants Diane Hallagan and Lee Warburton, Simmons won the final series of Radio 4 quiz Masterteam in 2005/06.

He was a semi-finalist on Mastermind and also reached the final of the 2008/09 series of the radio programme Brain of Britain, but was defeated by Geoff Thomas.

Simmons has been a researcher at text question and answer service AQA 63336 since 2006. He was part of an AQA team that appeared on Eggheads; he won his own round but the team was defeated in the final round.

He returned to compete individually on spin-off show Are You an Egghead? in 2008, where he won Series 1, defeating fellow future Egghead David Rainford in the semi-final and Shaun Wallace in the final. As a result he earned the right to appear as the 6th Egghead on the regular programme, joining Kevin Ashman, CJ de Mooi, Daphne Fowler, Christopher Hughes and Judith Keppel on the regular show in December 2008. He was the first person to appear on Eggheads as part of both the Eggheads, and a 'challengers' team.

About being an Egghead, he told The Jewish Chronicle, "It’s the best job in British quizzing and to get paid for doing something you love is just the icing on the cake. But I have to admit I hate losing."

In the 2012/3 season, Simmons reached the final of Brain of Britain and won the competition in 2013. Before the final, some controversy was caused as he was thought of as "a professional quizzer". As reported by the BBC website, "There is no rule banning Eggheads from appearing on Brain of Britain – the only rule is that former champions are not allowed to return."

In 2013 he was ranked number three quizzer in the world. He also appeared on Only Connect in 2013.

== Personal life ==
Simmons is Jewish and is a member of the Beth Hamidrash Hagadol Synagogue. On 4 July 1976 he married Janet. They have two children.
