= Jesse Honey =

British quizzer

Medal record

Quizzing

Representing England

British Championships (BQC)
Bronze medal – third place	2010 Derby	Singles
Silver medal – second place	2010 Derby	Pairs
Gold medal – first place	2012 Lichfield	Singles

IQA World Championships
Gold medal – first place	2012 Lichfield	Singles

IQA European Championships
Gold medal – first place	2010 Derby	National Team
Silver medal – second place	2010 Derby	Club
Gold medal – first place	2011 Bruges	Club
Gold medal – first place	2012 Tartu	National Team
Gold medal – first place	2013 Liverpool	National Team
Bronze medal – third place	2013 Liverpool	Singles

Jesse Honey (born 1977) is an English urban planner and quiz player from South London, best known for winning the Mastermind series 2010 and holding one of its records, becoming a member of the English National quiz team later in the year, and going on to win the World Quizzing Championship (individual title) 2012.

== Life ==
Honey, the son of an English father and American mother, Nancy Honey, was born and grew up in Bath, Somerset, but later moved to London. He studied Japanese at Durham University and took a Master's degree in Town planning at University College London. He worked full-time as a town planner and was therefore the only quiz amateur in the national team.

=== TV / Mastermind ===
In the 1990s he won Blockbusters. In the 1998–99 series he lost the semifinal of University Challenge as part of a team from Durham University, who controversially lost to the Open University. He won the Mastermind 2010 series, in the final achieving a record total score of 37 in the John Humphrys era of the programme. In a further tournament called Mastermind Champion of Champions he even established a new record for specialist subjects reaching 23 points with "Flags of the World". He beat David Edwards but was edged out in the last round by reigning World Champion Pat Gibson on pass countback (Gibson 36 points, no passes; Honey 36 points, two passes).

=== Competitive quizzing ===
He has also won nine English Grand Prix events as of June 2012, made the Top 10 of the World Quizzing Championships three times straight 2007 to 2009 and in 2010 won a British Quizzing Championships Bronze medal in the individuals and a Silver with partner Sean Carey at pairs. For a long time he stood in the shadows of England's four world champions Kevin Ashman, who holds the overall Mastermind record with 41 points, the aforementioned Gibson, Olav Bjortomt and Mark Bytheway and thus only made the national squad after Bytheway's premature death in 2010.

In the Quiz League of London he replaced David Stainer at the world's most successful club "Broken Hearts", three time European Champions 2007 to 2009 in the line-up Bjortomt, Dr Ian Bayley, Stainer and Mark Grant, the team won Silver in 2010 losing to Kevin Ashman's Milhous Warriors. In pairs he teamed up with Bayley at the EQC 2010, creating a duo of 2010 season winners as Bayley had won Brain of Britain season 2009/2010 but did not medal. In 2012 he won several British Grands Prix and won the WQC with a world record score.
