= Mastermind Champion of Champions =

British quiz show

Mastermind Champion of Champions is a pair of special series of BBC quiz program Mastermind, featuring past winners. The first series was broadcast in 1982 to celebrate the series' 10th anniversary and was won by Sir David Hunt over the other nine series winners.

Another series of Champion of Champions was televised Monday to Friday at 7:30pm on BBC Two in the first full week of August 2010. The series was won by future Eggheads panellist Pat Gibson. Contestants had around six weeks to prepare for their appearances.

== Results ==
=== 2010 series ===
The winner is indicated in bold.

Episode number	Transmission date	Round	Contestant (year won)	Specialist Subject	Specialist Subject score (passes)	General Knowledge score (passes)	Total score (passes)
1	2 August 2010	Heat 1	Geoff Thomas (2006)	Donald Bradman (1908 - 2001)	16 (0)	12 (0)	28 (0)
1	2 August 2010	Heat 1	Jeremy Bradbrooke (1987)	The Crimean War (1853 - 6)	16 (1)	9 (1)	25 (2)
1	2 August 2010	Heat 1	**Jesse Honey** **(2010)**	**National Flags of the World**	**23** **(0)**	**15** **(2)**	**38** **(2)**
1	2 August 2010	Heat 1	Stephen Tomlin (1991)	Edward Thomas (1878–1917)	16 (3)	13 (0)	29 (3)
2	3 August 2010	Heat 2	**Gavin Fuller** **(1993)**	**Mike Oldfield** **(1972)**	**19** **(0)**	**9** **(2)**	**28** **(2)**
2	3 August 2010	Heat 2	Elizabeth Horrocks (1974)	The Arthurian Legend	13 (3)	8 (5)	21 (8)
2	3 August 2010	Heat 2	Shaun Wallace (2004)	Frasier (1993 - 2004)	17 (0)	5 (0)	22 (0)
2	3 August 2010	Heat 2	Chris Hughes (1983)	British Steam Locomotives 1900 - 1968	15 (0)	10 (3)	25 (3)
3	4 August 2010	Heat 3	The Revd Dr Richard Sturch (1996)	King Michael of Romania (b 1921)	15 (1)	11 (5)	26 (6)
3	4 August 2010	Heat 3	Andy Page (2003)	Arrested Development (2003 - 2006)	15 (5)	12 (3)	27 (8)
3	4 August 2010	Heat 3	Nancy Dickmann (2009)	Roald Amundsen (1872 - 1928)	16 (0)	11 (2)	27 (2)
3	4 August 2010	Heat 3	**David Edwards** **(1990)**	**Mystery of Rennes-le-Château (since 1950)**	**16** **(0)**	**12** **(2)**	**28** **(2)**
4	5 August 2010	Heat 4	David Clark (2008)	The Bayeux Embroidery (c. 1076)	17 (1)	13 (3)	30 (4)
4	5 August 2010	Heat 4	Patricia Owen (1973)	The Operas of Benjamin Britten (1913–76)	11 (3)	8 (5)	19 (8)
4	5 August 2010	Heat 4	Leslie Grout (1981)	Burial Grounds of London	15 (0)	8 (0)	23 (0)
4	5 August 2010	Heat 4	**Pat Gibson** **(2005)**	**Pixar Animated Films (est 1986)**	**16** **(0)**	**14** **(0)**	**30** **(0)**
5	6 August 2010	Final	Gavin Fuller (1993)	HMS Warrior	17 (0)	15 (2)	32 (2)
5	6 August 2010	Final	**Pat Gibson** **(2005)**	**Great Mathematicians**	**16** **(0)**	**20** **(0)**	**36** **(0)**
5	6 August 2010	Final	David Edwards (1990)	Count Rumford	16 (0)	16 (0)	32 (0)
5	6 August 2010	Final	Jesse Honey (2010)	Westminster Cathedral	17 (1)	19 (1)	36 (2)
