= BQA =

BQA may refer to:

- British Quiz Association, a United Kingdom-based quiz association
- BQA, the IATA code for Dr. Juan C. Angara Airport, Baler, Aurora, Philippines
- BQA, the Indian Railways station code for Bankura Junction railway station, West Bengal, India
