= David Edwards (quiz contestant) =

Welsh physics teacher

- Born: 1947 (age 78–79); Barry, Vale of Glamorgan, Wales
- Occupation: Physics teacher
- Known for: Second top prize winner (and first male winner) of the British television game show Who Wants to Be a Millionaire?
- Children: 2

David Edwards
Medal record

Quizzing

Representing Wales

European Championships
Silver medal – second place	2008 Oslo	Club

British Championships (BQC)
Gold medal – first place	2008 Stavely	Pairs
Gold medal – first place	2010 Derby	Pairs

David Edwards (born 1947) is a Welsh physics teacher, best known as a TV quiz contestant. On 21 April 2001 he became the first man to win the million pounds in the UK version of Who Wants to Be a Millionaire? and only the second person after Judith Keppel. He competed in both series of Are You an Egghead?, reaching the last 16 in 2008, and the final in 2009, where he lost to fellow Millionaire winner Pat Gibson.

== Early career ==
Born in Barry, Wales, Edwards graduated in Metallurgy from Swansea University in 1969, subsequently completing a Postgraduate Certificate in Education at Keele University. He studied Advanced French as an external student at Keele University with his wife Viv Edwards. He worked as a physics teacher at Cheadle High School and Denstone College, Staffordshire, prior to his appearance on Millionaire.

== Who Wants to Be a Millionaire ==
£1 million (15 of 15)

If you planted the seeds of Quercus robur, what would grow?

1. Trees(correct answer)
2. Flowers
3. Vegetables
4. Grain

His million pound question was "If you planted the seeds of Quercus robur, what would grow?" The options were Trees, Flowers, Vegetables and Grain. The correct answer was Trees. He used no lifelines for this question, having used all three on a £125,000 question. The phone-a-friend he used during his run was his son, Richard Edwards, who later won £125,000 on the show in May 2004, and David returned the favour and acted as his son's phone-a-friend.

== Other quiz appearances ==
Edwards was the Mastermind champion in 1990, and was awarded the title of Mensa Superbrain in 1985 after winning a newspaper competition.

Edwards has also participated in a grand final of Fifteen to One, and appeared in both series of Are You an Egghead?, reaching the final of series two but coming second to fellow Mastermind and Who Wants to Be a Millionaire (WWTBAM) winner Pat Gibson. He has won the British Quizzing Championships for pairs in 2008 and 2010 with his partner Nic Paul.

Broadcast on 30 March 2012, he appeared on the quiz show Champions special edition of The Weakest Link, competing against other winners of major UK quiz shows including Chris Hughes and fellow WWTBAM winner Judith Keppel. He was voted off in Round 6 with 2 votes.

In the 7 September 2016 edition of Make Me an Egghead, he lost to Terry Toomey in the final round, despite having two Eggheads to help him to Toomey's one. Edwards had Kevin Ashman and Pat Gibson on his side. However, neither could help him on two questions, both of which he got wrong.

== International quizzing ==
Edwards has been a member of the Welsh National Quiz Team since its inception. Since 2008 Edwards has been the Captain of the national side, and in 2010 led Wales to its highest ever finish in the European Championships (4th).

Preceded by Judith Keppel	Top prize winner on Who Wants to Be a Millionaire? (UK); 21 April 2001	Succeeded by Charles Ingram (disqualified); Robert Brydges
