= Neil Shand =

British television comedy writer

- Born: Neil Hodgson Shand; 3 March 1934; Luton, Bedfordshire, England
- Died: 14 April 2018 (aged 84); Whitton, North Lincolnshire, England
- Occupation(s): Television Writer; Print journalist
- Spouse: Judith Keppel (m. 1985; sep. 1987)

Neil Hodgson Shand (3 March 1934 – 14 April 2018) was an English television comedy writer.

== Early life ==
He was born in Luton to parents from Glasgow, the son of a Vauxhall employee and a dressmaker. Neil was the eldest of three boys.

== Career ==
Raised in a "two up two down" house, he passed the 11-plus, and had a positive experience of attending a grammar school. Virtually blind in one eye, his eyesight was saved by an operation at 14 on the day the National Health Service was founded (5 July 1948). He began to work for a local paper, the Luton Gazette, after leaving school. Briefly working for the nationals while still having the day job in Luton, he managed to gain a regular job at the Daily Sketch after finding details of the 21st birthday party of a son of the Aga Khan at the Savoy Hotel.

Shand was later a journalist for the Daily Mail and Daily Express, before moving into comedy writing in the 1960s. Shortly after being sacked from the Mail for being drunk once too often, he ran into the documentary maker Michael Ingrams, who eventually introduced him to Bernard Braden, for whom Shand first began to write humorous material.

Shand worked extensively with David Frost, beginning with The Frost Programme in 1967. Subsequent work with Frost included ITV's coverage of Apollo 11 landing on the Moon in 1969, and spells in New York working on Frost's American talk show as a "creative consultant".

His work with impressionist Mike Yarwood began around the same time with the sketch show Three of a Kind (1967). Shand also wrote for such acts as Spike Milligan, Kenny Everett, Bob Monkhouse, The Two Ronnies and Jasper Carrott (on Carrott Confidential). He was a member of BBC staff for many years.

Shand married Judith Keppel in 1985; the marriage ended in 1987. He died on 14 April 2018, aged 84, in Whitton, North Lincolnshire, where he had lived since 2003.

== Books ==
- Melting Pot (1983) – with Spike Milligan
- 1956 and All That (1984) – with Ned Sherrin
- True Brit (1992) – with Jim Davidson
