= Pat Gibson =

Irish quizzer (born 1961)

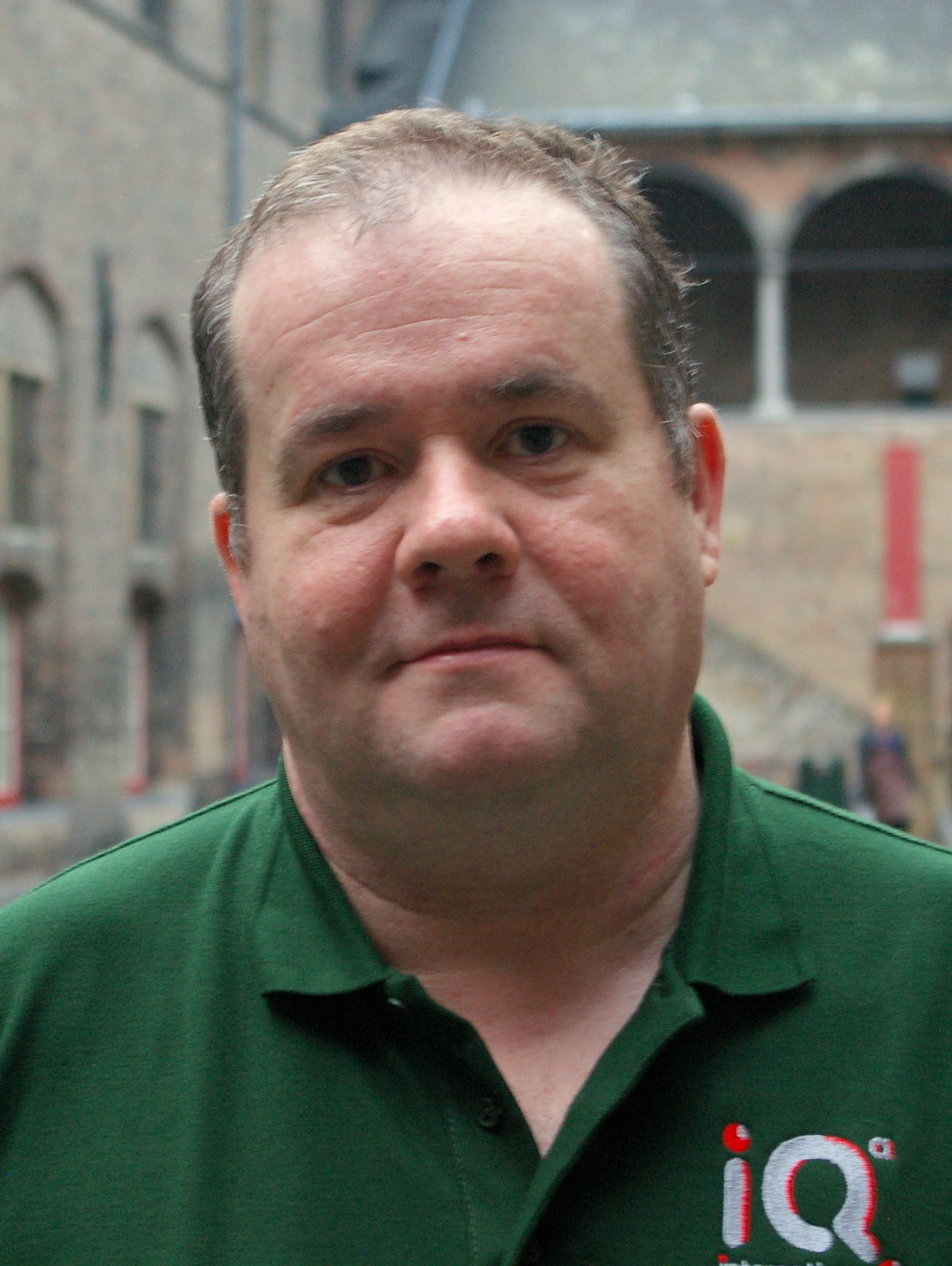
- Pat Gibson at the European Quizzing Championship 2011 in Bruges, Belgium
- Born: 19 July 1961 (age 64); Galway, County Galway, Ireland
- Known for: Eggheads panellist; Are You an Egghead? panellist; Make Me an Egghead panellist; Mastermind Champion; Mastermind Champion of Champions; Brain of Britain Champion; Who Wants to Be a Millionaire? jackpot winner; European Quiz Champion; World Quiz Champion

Patrick Gibson (born 19 July 1961) is an Irish quizzer based in the United Kingdom. On 24 April 2004, he became the fifth contestant to win the £1m jackpot on the quiz show Who Wants to Be a Millionaire? and the fourth legitimate contestant to do so. He is a multiple world champion in quizzing and one of the world's most successful quiz players. He is best known for winning several quiz shows and being a panellist on Eggheads. He was born, raised and educated in Ireland but currently lives in the United Kingdom and competes as part of the England quiz team. As of 5 December 2018, Gibson was the No. 1 ranked quizzer in the world.

== Early life and education ==
Pat was born in Galway in 1961. He moved to Letterkenny, County Donegal in the early 1970s. He was educated at Scoil Colmcille and St Eunan's College in Letterkenny. Pat holds an engineering degree from University College Galway. He emigrated to the United Kingdom in the 1980s, where he trained as a COBOL computer programmer.

== TV quiz shows ==
=== Who Wants to Be a Millionaire? ===
£1 million (15 of 15)
Which of these is not one of the American Triple Crown horse races?
⬥ A: Arlington Million	⬥ B: Belmont Stakes
⬥ C: Kentucky Derby	⬥ D: Preakness Stakes
Gibson's £1 million question

On his one million pound question, he still had his 50:50 and phone a friend (he had used the Ask-the-Audience lifeline on the £64,000 question). The question was "Which of these is not one of the American Triple Crown horse races?" Gibson used the 50:50 first, where B. "Belmont Stakes" and D. "Preakness Stakes" disappeared. With A. "Arlington Million" and C. "Kentucky Derby", he then used his phone-a-friend option, phoning Mark Kerr (a highly ranked British quiz player and winner of TV's "Brainiest Estate Agent" title, as well as winner of £250,000 on Who Wants to Be a Millionaire) who said he was 90% sure the answer was Arlington Million, which was Pat's original instinct. Gibson had acted as Kerr's phone-a-friend during his appearance on the show during the same series (15), broadcast weeks before Gibson's success. He correctly answered "Arlington Million" to win £1 million.

=== Mastermind ===
In 2005 he was crowned champion of Mastermind: his specialist subjects included Father Ted, the books of Iain M. Banks and the films of Quentin Tarantino.

On 6 August 2010 he was crowned Mastermind Champion of Champions with a winning score of 36 points with no passes. Jesse Honey also scored 36 but had 2 passes.

=== Brain of Britain ===
On 25 December 2006 he won the BBC Radio 4 quiz show Brain of Britain, becoming only the fourth person after Roger Pritchard, Kevin Ashman and Chris Hughes to win both that and Mastermind.

In 2008 he finished third in BBC Radio 4's Brain of Brains, behind Egghead Chris Hughes and the eventual winner, 2008 World Quizzing Champion Mark Bytheway.

=== Eggheads and Are You an Egghead? ===
Gibson competed in both the first and second series of Are You an Egghead?, a series seeking a new panellist to join the resident team on the BBC Two / 12 Yard quiz show Eggheads. In the first series, he was beaten in the quarter-finals by friend Mark Kerr. He returned for the second series in 2009, and won the final broadcast on 23 November 2009, beating fellow Mastermind and Who Wants to Be a Millionaire? winner David Edwards and thereby claiming a place on the Eggheads team.

== National and international quizzing championships ==
Pat Gibson
Medal record

Quizzing

Representing England

British Championships (BQC)
Silver medal – second place	2004 Old Trafford	Singles
Silver medal – second place	2006 Shrewsbury	Singles
Gold medal – first place	2006 Shrewsbury	Pairs
Gold medal – first place	2007 Staveley	Singles
Bronze medal – third place	2009 Derby	Singles
Gold medal – first place	2010 Derby	Singles
Gold medal – first place	2011 Lichfield	Pairs
Silver medal – second place	2011 Lichfield	Singles
Silver medal – second place	2013 Hilton	Singles
Gold medal – first place	2014 Rothwell	Singles
Gold medal – first place	2015 Newark	Singles

World Championships
Silver medal – second place	2003 Villa Park	Singles
Silver medal – second place	2004 Old Trafford	Singles
Silver medal – second place	2005 Silverstone	Singles
Silver medal – second place	2006 Newport	Singles
Gold medal – first place	2007 Irthlingborough	Singles
Gold medal – first place	2010 Peterborough	Singles
Gold medal – first place	2011 Lichfield	Singles
Silver medal – second place	2012 Lichfield	Singles
Gold medal – first place	2013 Masham	Singles
Bronze medal – third place	2015 Burton upon Trent	Singles
Bronze medal – third place	2016 Northampton	Singles
Bronze medal – third place	2017 Northampton	Singles
Bronze medal – third place	2018	Singles

European Championships
Bronze medal – third place	2004 Ghent	Singles
Gold medal – first place	2004 Ghent	National Team
Bronze medal – third place	2005 Tallinn	Singles
Gold medal – first place	2005 Tallinn	Pairs
Silver medal – second place	2005 Tallinn	National Team
Bronze medal – third place	2006 Paris	Singles
Silver medal – second place	2006 Paris	National Team
Silver medal – second place	2006 Paris	Club
Bronze medal – third place	2007 Blackpool	Singles
Gold medal – first place	2007 Blackpool	National Team
Silver medal – second place	2008 Oslo	Singles
Silver medal – second place	2008 Oslo	National Team
Silver medal – second place	2008 Oslo	Club
Bronze medal – third place	2009 Dordrecht	Singles
Silver medal – second place	2009 Dordrecht	Pairs
Gold medal – first place	2009 Dordrecht	National Team
Bronze medal – third place	2010 Derby	Singles
Gold medal – first place	2010 Derby	Pairs
Gold medal – first place	2010 Derby	National Team
Silver medal – second place	2011 Bruges	Singles
Gold medal – first place	2011 Bruges	Pairs
Gold medal – first place	2012 Tartu	Pairs
Gold medal – first place	2012 Tartu	National Team
Gold medal – first place	2013 Liverpool	Pairs
Gold medal – first place	2013 Liverpool	National Team
Gold medal – first place	2013 Liverpool	Club
Silver medal – second place	2013 Liverpool	Masters
Silver medal – second place	2014 Bucharest	Pairs
Gold medal – first place	2014 Bucharest	National Team
Bronze medal – third place	2015 Rotterdam	Singles
Gold medal – first place	2015 Rotterdam	Pairs
Gold medal – first place	2015 Rotterdam	National Team
Bronze medal – third place	2016 Athens	Singles
Gold medal – first place	2016 Athens	Pairs
Gold medal – first place	2016 Athens	National Team
Bronze medal – third place	2016 Athens	Club
Gold medal – first place	2017 Zagreb	Singles
Gold medal – first place	2017 Zagreb	Pairs
Gold medal – first place	2017 Zagreb	National Team
Gold medal – first place	2018 Venice	Singles
Silver medal – second place	2018 Venice	Pairs
Bronze medal – third place	2018 Venice	National Team
Gold medal – first place	2019 Sofia	Pairs
Gold medal – first place	2019 Sofia	National Team
Bronze medal – third place	2019 Sofia	Club
Bronze medal – third place	2023 Torremolinos	National Team
Bronze medal – third place	2023 Torremolinos	Club
Bronze medal – third place	2024 Fuengirola	National Team
Bronze medal – third place	2024 Fuengirola	Pairs
Bronze medal – third place	2024 Fuengirola	Club

He has amassed 25 international medals (7 gold, 11 silver and 7 bronze), the second highest total ever (behind Kevin Ashman with 27) and is ranked the second strongest player in the World/Europe. In 2007 Gibson won the IQA World Quizzing Championship. In pairs competitions he partners Ian Bayley and they have won the British and European titles.

In 2010 Gibson won the IQA World Quizzing Championship achieving an all-time high score of 180/210, defeating both Kevin Ashman and Belgian Ronny Swiggers who tied at 169/210. Gibson retained the World Quizzing Championship title in 2011 with a score of 186/210, a 10-point margin over Kevin Ashman, and won again in 2013 with a score of 172/210.

Despite being originally from Ireland, Gibson competes for the England team.

Gibson has participated in various online quiz leagues and was the Season 1 champion of the Topic Slayer League (defeating Mario Fernando and Ayush Sharma in the finals), an international quiz competition based in Batanagar, West Bengal.

== Domestic competition ==
Pat plays in the Summer in the Orrell and District League for the Millstone team, and in the winter in the Ormskirk league for Collywobblers.

Preceded by Robert Brydges	Top prize winner on Who Wants to Be a Millionaire? (UK); 24 April 2004	Succeeded by Ingram Wilcox
