= The Great British Quiz =

- Genre: Game show
- Presented by: Janice Long (1994); Philip Hayton (1994-5)
- Country of origin: United Kingdom
- Original language: English
- No. of series: 3
- No. of episodes: 112

Production
- Running time: 25 minutes
- Production companies: Analogue and BBC North

Original release
- Network: BBC1
- Release: 31 January 1994 – 24 October 1995

The Great British Quiz is a British game show that aired on BBC1 from 31 January 1994 to 24 October 1995. It is hosted by Janice Long for the first series and then hosted by Philip Hayton for the second and third series.

== Transmissions ==
Series	Start date	End date	Episodes
1	31 January 1994	21 April 1994	43
2	17 October 1994	23 December 1994	39
3	11 September 1995	24 October 1995	30
