= Jay's Virtual Pub Quiz =

General knowledge YouTube quiz

- Genre: Pub quiz
- Created by: Jay Flynn
- Presented by: Jay Flynn
- Country of origin: United Kingdom
- Original language: English
- No. of episodes: >150

Production
- Camera setup: Single-camera

Original release
- Release: 26 March 2020

Jay's Virtual Pub Quiz is a streamed general knowledge charity quiz, inspired by the British tradition of pub quizzes. It is hosted by Jay Flynn, a former publican, and began airing following the closure of pubs as a result of the UK's response to the COVID-19 pandemic. Over 200 quizzes have been aired, which have raised over £1.3 million for various charities.

== Jay Flynn ==
Jay Flynn MBE
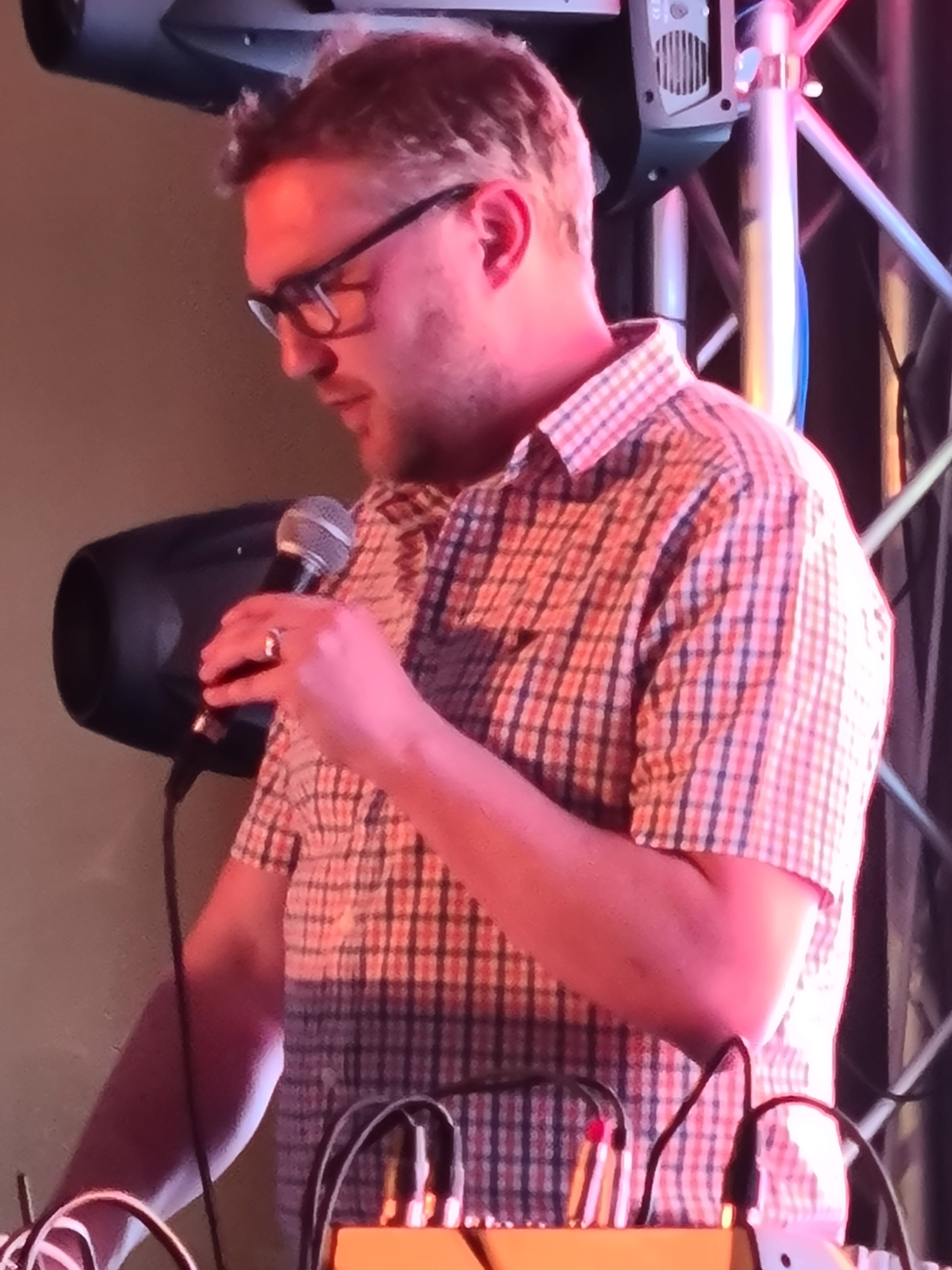
- Flynn in June 2021
- Born: Johnny James Flynn; 9 April 1982 (age 44)
- Occupation: Quizmaster

YouTube information
- Channel: Jay's Virtual Pub Quiz
- Years active: 2020–present
- Genres: Trivia, general knowledge
- Subscribers: 188,000
- Views: 24.9 million
- Last updated: 4 August 2026

For two years in his mid-twenties, Jay Flynn (born Johnny James Flynn on 9 April 1982) was homeless in London, and slept near the River Thames on a bench near Embankment tube station that he referred to as "Number 3, Riverside View". In November 2021, the bench was commemorated with a plaque that reads "Number 3, Riverside View. This bench was home to Jay Flynn from Jay's Virtual Pub Quiz. He proves you are not alone and there is always hope. Search Connection at St Martin's. Call Samaritans 116 123 free."

Following help from The Connection at St Martin's, a homelessness charity, Flynn was able to obtain benefits and live in shared accommodation. He subsequently moved to Wigan in Greater Manchester before settling in Darwen, Lancashire and found employment. At the time the quiz began, Flynn was a sales executive for a Suzuki dealership in Blackburn. His wife Sarah is an administrator with the NHS, and they have one son. Flynn is a supporter of Tottenham Hotspur.

== Quiz ==
=== Background ===
In 2019, Flynn and a business partner began running the Crown public house in Darwen. While at the pub, Flynn introduced a weekly pub quiz. He left the pub in early March 2020, shortly before pubs were forced to close as part of the UK's response to the COVID-19 pandemic. Intending to continue his weekly quiz online, Flynn set up a Facebook event for the regular teams. Having configured the listing incorrectly, he had inadvertently allowed any Facebook user to attend the event—within days, 250,000 people had registered their interest in partaking, and by the day of the event, approximately 500,000 users had responded as attending or interested in the quiz.

=== Format ===
Flynn has hosted quizzes of different formats—live general knowledge quizzes, short themed "specialist" quizzes, and short quizzes made for children. Since 26 March 2020, there have been over 150 quizzes, the majority of which have been live general knowledge quizzes. Three celebrity-hosted general knowledge quizzes were broadcast on 22 May, 29 May, and 5 June, and were hosted by Stephen Fry, Jonathan Ross, and Scarlett Moffatt respectively. In June, Flynn hosted a single music-themed live quiz. These live quizzes air on Thursday and Saturday evenings, and usually feature five rounds of ten questions followed by a final tiebreaker question. The length of these quizzes—including preamble, charity messages, and intervals—is approximately 1 hour 40 minutes. The live stream begin at 19:50, with the quiz beginning at 20:15. The broadcasts has previous included the "Clap for Our Carers" and musical performances from Rick Astley and Maverick Sabre.

The "specialist" quizzes and children's quizzes are pre-recorded and are aired on Mondays, Fridays, or Sundays. Their runtime is between 5 and 20 minutes, and themes have included topics such as Harry Potter films, retro video gaming, and soap operas.

=== Production ===
As of 2020, Flynn simulcasted the quiz on Facebook Live and YouTube using Open Broadcaster Software (OBS) and a Studio Series SL150 condenser microphone. His social media strategy has been assisted by Alex Holmes, Deputy CEO of The Diana Award.

== Reception ==
TechRadar described the quiz as "the first virtual pub quiz to go truly viral when the UK's lockdown started".

=== Fundraising ===
Flynn initially aimed to raise £15,000 for NHS Charities Together. By early May, he had raised £93,000. In the first three months of running his online quizzes, Flynn had raised approximately £400,000 for charity. As well as fundraising for NHS Charities together and the Connection at St Martin's, the quizzes have raised funds for Alzheimer's Research UK, Guide Dogs, and the Diana, Princess of Wales Memorial Award. On 6 August, Flynn announced that the total raised to date was over £700,000.

=== Awards ===
The 30 April quiz set a Guinness World Record for "most viewers of a quiz YouTube live stream" with 182,513 individual viewers. The following month, Flynn received the Prime Minister's Points of Light award; Boris Johnson thanked him for "raising [the country's] spirits".

In September 2020, Flynn was nominated for Regional Fundraiser of the Year as part of ITV Granada's Pride of Britain Awards.

In the 2020 Birthday Honours, Flynn was awarded the MBE for "charitable service during Covid-19".

== Other work ==
Flynn presents Jay's Virtual Radio Quiz, short weekly quiz of five questions on BBC Radio 2's Breakfast Show on the morning of his Thursday evening quiz. A book written by Flynn, Jay's Virtual Pub Quiz Book, was released by Mirror Books on 8 October 2020. It includes a quote from Stephen Fry, who describes Flynn as "Q – the quizmaster's quizmaster" and states that "his achievements form one of the happiest and most hopeful stories to have emerged from the madness of lockdown". In April 2024, it was announced that a full-length autobiography The Quizmaster: From Life on the Streets to Global Quizzing Sensation co-written with the co-author of A Street Cat Named Bob, Garry Jenkins, was to be published by Hodder & Stoughton in May 2024. The book reached Number Eight in the Sunday Times Best-Seller list in its first week of publication.
