= British Quizzing Championships =

Quiz competition in the United Kingdom

The British Quiz Championship (BQC), also termed the British Quizzing Championship, is a quiz competition in the United Kingdom. The current competition has been organised since 2004 by Chris Jones' and IQA-CEO Jane Allen's company Quizzing Ltd. Early in 2011 the re-launch of the quizzing.co.uk website saw it rebranded as the home of the British Quiz Association.

Before 2004 there had already been some sort of "British Championship" since 1999 run first only by Trevor Montague then by the British Quiz Association (see that page for champions), but after internal strife and a fall in interest in 2003/2004 (see attendance in the BQA links) the old BQA-management gave up and the only British Quiz Championship now is this one run by Quizzing Ltd.

== British Quizzing Championship Roll of Honour since 2004 ==
Year	Venue	Winner - Singles	Winner - Pairs
2004	Old Trafford Manchester	Kevin Ashman	Not held
2005	Altrincham	Kevin Ashman	Not held
2006	Shrewsbury	Kevin Ashman	Ian Bayley & Pat Gibson
2007	Derby	Pat Gibson	Gareth Aubrey & Olav Bjortomt
2008	Staveley	Sean Carey	David Edwards & Nic Paul
2009	Derby	Mark Bytheway	David Lea & Kathryn Johnson
2010	Derby	Pat Gibson	David Edwards & Nic Paul
2011	Lichfield	Kevin Ashman	Pat Gibson & Ian Bayley
2012	Lichfield	Jesse Honey	David Stainer & Olav Bjortomt
2013	Hilton, Edinburgh, Dublin	Kevin Ashman	Kevin Ashman & Pat Gibson
2014	Rothwell, Edinburgh, Dublin	Pat Gibson	David Stainer & Olav Bjortomt
2015	Newark, Edinburgh, Dublin	Pat Gibson	Anne Hegerty & John Wilson
2016	Coventry, Edinburgh	Nic Paul	Brian Chesney & Jeff Evans
2017	Coventry, Edinburgh	Kevin Ashman	Kevin Ashman & Pat Gibson
2018	Coventry, Edinburgh, London	Pat Gibson	Not held
2019	Northampton, Edinburgh	Paul Sinha	Kevin Ashman & Pat Gibson
2020	Various	Pat Gibson	Not held
2021	Various	Evan Lynch	Not held
2022	Various	Pat Gibson	Pat Gibson & Scott Dawson
2023	Various	Pat Gibson	Not held
2024	Various	Pat Gibson	Not held
2025	Various	Pat Gibson	n/k

== 2004 - Venue Old Trafford Manchester - Winner Kevin Ashman ==
The 2004 British Quiz Championship was run in 2004 as part of the World Quizzing Championship - as staged at various worldwide locations, such as Old Trafford Stadium on 3 July 2004),

The 2004 event saw 67 entrants at Old Trafford who were joined, in the international event, by several hundred other Quizzers from countries such as Belgium, Estonia, the Netherlands, India and Malaysia quizzing in places such as Bangalore and Kuala Lumpur.

Both the 2004 British and World events were won by England's Kevin Ashman.

== 2005 - Venue Altrincham - Winner Kevin Ashman ==
Having won the 2005 MSN Search sponsored World Quizzing Championships on 2 July Kevin Ashman went on to retain his British title later that year.

Position	Competitor
1	Kevin Ashman
2	Mark Bytheway
3	John Wilson
4	Barry Simmons
5	Geoff Thomas
6	Pat Gibson
=7	Dag Griffiths
=7	Eric Kilby
=7	Sean Carey
=7	Darren Martin

== 2006 - Venue Boreatton Park, Shrewsbury - Winner Kevin Ashman ==
Kevin Ashman made it a hat-trick of British Championships in 2005. In a field of 41 competitors Ashman won by 21 points from Mark Bytheway and Pat Gibson in joint second position. A full report on the event is available here

Position	Competitor
1	Kevin Ashman
=2	Mark Bytheway
=2	Pat Gibson
=4	John Wilson
=4	Olav Bjortomt
6	Mark Labbett
7	Mark Kerr
8	Barbara Thompson
9	Eric Kilby
10	Ian Bayley

== 2007 - Venue Derby Conference Centre - Winner Pat Gibson ==
The absence of the previous winners and runners up for the last two years (Kevin Ashman and Mark Bytheway) left the field wide open. Pat Gibson emerged victorious, adding the British title to the World title he had also taken from Ashman earlier in the year. Gibson's margin of victory over Bjortomt was 12 points.

Position	Competitor
1	Pat Gibson
2	Olav Bjortomt
=3	Mark Labbett
=3	William De'Ath
5	Eric Kilby
6	Nic Paul
=7	Chris Quinn
=7	Ian Bayley
=7	Mark Kerr
=7	John Wilson

A full report is available here.

== 2008 - Venue Staveley - Winner Sean Carey ==
A field of 61 competitors including Kevin Ashman (3 time British Champion, past World and European Champion), Mark Bytheway (2008 World Quiz Champion), Pat Gibson (2007 World and British Champion) met at Staveley in Derbyshire. With such a strong field of competitors it was perhaps a surprise that it was Sean Carey who took the title, beating second placed Kevin Ashman by 8 points. Ranked 19th before the start of the event, Carey is the lowest ranked competitor to win the British title, and the first person from outside the top 3. That said, he was likely ranked lower than he ought to have been on account of his not being able to attend as many ranking events as his peers. When he has competed in Grands Prix he has typically been placed in the top 10 of finishers.

Position	Competitor
1	Sean Carey
2	Kevin Ashman
3	Mark Bytheway
4	Pat Gibson
5	Nic Paul
=6	Alan Gibbs
=6	John Wilson
=6	Olav Bjortomt
=9	Chris Quinn
=9	Dave Edwards
=9	Mark Labbett

== 2009 - Venue Derby Conference Centre - Winner Mark Bytheway ==
All previous title winners participated in the event. For the first time, the competition was decided by a tie-break between Kevin Ashman and Mark Bytheway, who had finished eight points ahead of third-place competitor Pat Gibson. The players' discarded scores in the Sport & Games category were used to determine the winner, with Bytheway winning by one point, 170 to 169, out of a possible 240. The event had 62 participants. Bytheway competed while recovering from surgery following a serious illness. Ashman accepted the result graciously, retaining his individual world and European titles.

Position	Competitor
1	Mark Bytheway
2	Kevin Ashman
3	Pat Gibson
4	Chris Quinn
5	Jesse Honey
6	Sean Carey
7	Mark Kerr
8	John Wilson
9	Nic Paul
10	Ian Bayley

There was a first in the Pairs event, Kathryn Johnson partnering David Lea to a win. In so doing she becomes the first woman to hold a Championship title on the UK quiz circuit. Like the Individual event, the Pairs saw a tie, which had to be decided on 'countback'. The unlucky Pair who finished as runners-up were Chris Quinn and Mark Kerr.

== 2010 - Venue Derby Conference Centre - Winner Pat Gibson ==
Pat Gibson regained the title he first won in 2007 and was the first to get his hands on the new Mark Bytheway Trophy, named in memory of last year's winner who died in July 2010. The trophy is to be inscribed with the names of former winners. This year's questions were written by former (BQA/Montague era) champion, John Wilson (since 2006 they have been composed by Quizzing.co.uk's principal setter Chris Jones).

Position	Competitor
1	Pat Gibson
2	Kevin Ashman
3	Jesse Honey
4	Olav Bjortomt
5	Barry Simmons
6	Nic Paul
7	Dag Griffiths
8	Ian Bayley
9	David Stainer
10	Sean Carey

In the Pairs event, 2008 winners David Edwards and Nic Paul became the first duo to regain the title. Second place went to Jesse Honey & Sean Carey and third to Kevin Ashman & Pat Gibson.

== 2011 - Venue Cathedral Lodge Hotel, Lichfield - Winner Kevin Ashman ==
John Wilson again wrote the questions for the individual championship, which for the first time was held in 2 venues, the main one in Lichfield but with some players taking part in a venue in Normandy. Kevin Ashman won with a score of 158 out of a maximum 210, a full 24 points ahead of defending champion Pat Gibson.

Position	Competitor
1	Kevin Ashman
2	Pat Gibson
3	Ian Bayley
4	Olav Bjortomt
5	Eric Wildsmith
6	Sean Carey
7	Phil Smith
8	David Hesp
9	Alan Gibbs
10	Peter Watson

In the Pairs event, Ian Bayley and Pat Gibson repeated their win of 2006.
