= Kevin Ashman =

English professional quizzer (born 1959)

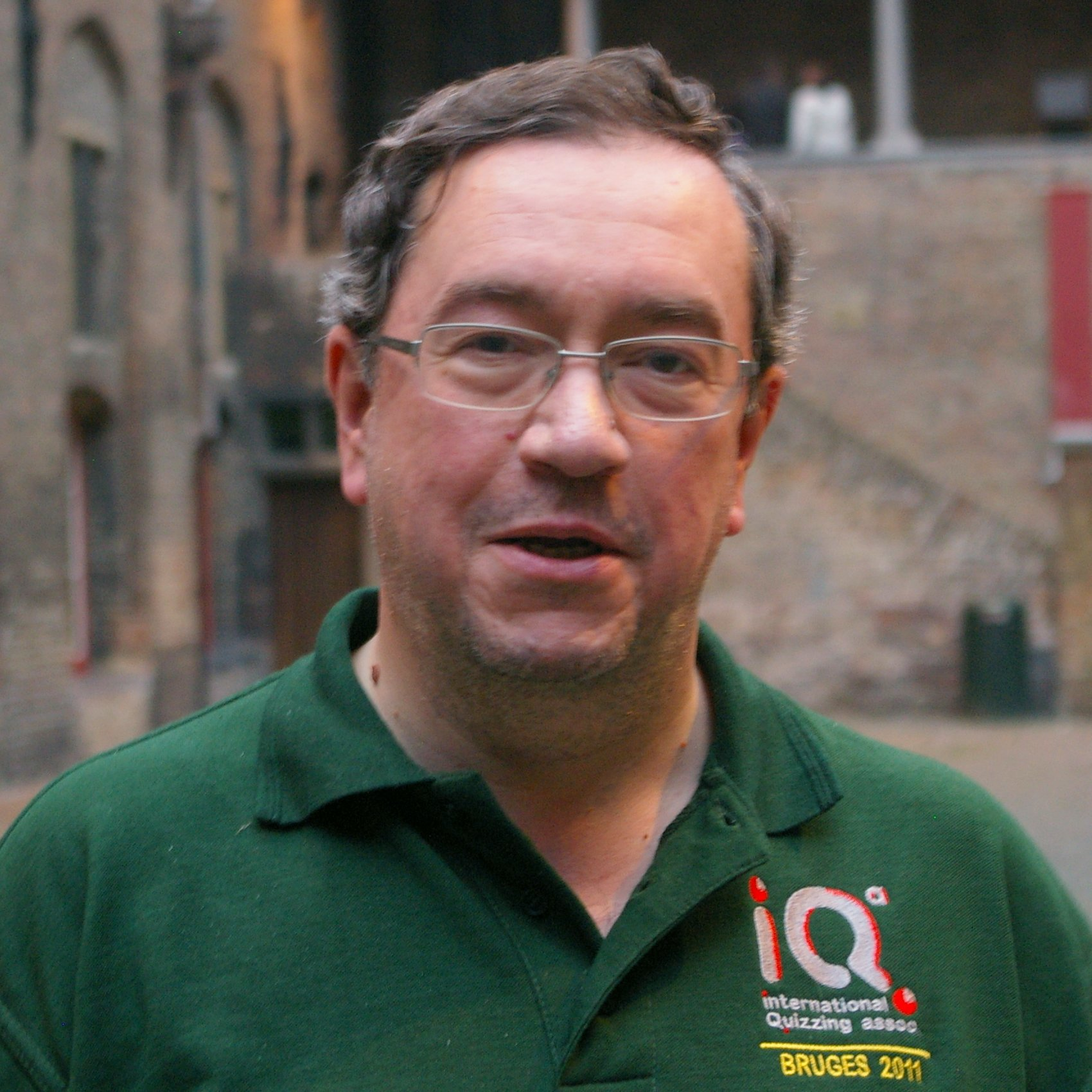
- Kevin Ashman at the European Quizzing Championship 2011 in Bruges, Belgium
- Born: 2 November 1959 (age 66); Winchester, Hampshire, England
- Occupation: Quiz player
- Known for: Eggheads panellist; Are You an Egghead? panellist; Make Me an Egghead panellist; Mastermind Champion; Brain of Britain Champion; British Quiz Champion; European Quiz Champion; World Quiz Champion

Kevin Clifford Ashman (born 2 November 1959) is an English quiz player. He is considered the greatest quizzer of all time, has been a professional quizzer since 2002 and he appeared on Eggheads from 2003 until 2023 and was the only Egghead to appear in every series of the show. He has won most of the top-level quiz tournaments in which he has taken part, among them several World and European Championships.

== Early life ==
Ashman was born in Winchester, Hampshire, He attended St Bede's Primary School and Peter Symonds Grammar School/College. He then graduated from the University of Southampton with a BA degree in Modern History. Ashman taught himself to read when he was three years old in the early 1960s.

== Career ==
Ashman had his first major television quiz success on Fifteen to One, winning Series 3 in 1989, and returned to win the special 'Millennium Edition' between past champions in 1999. In 1995, he won Mastermind, scoring a record 41 points with no passes in his heat. His specialist subject on that occasion was the life and work of Martin Luther King Jr. He later became the champion after winning the final with the subject Zulu War and, in 2006, appeared on the final of the Junior version encouraging a young contestant who also chose Zulu Wars as his final subject. In 1996, the year following his Mastermind victory, he won Brain of Britain, scoring 38 in his semi final, which remains the highest individual score ever made on the show. He then went on to win Brain of Brains (contested between the previous three years' Brains of Britain) and Top Brain (contested every nine years between the previous three Brain of Brains). Ashman also twice won Master Brain, a radio competition for winners and runners-up of Mastermind and Brain of Britain.

He also won Sale of the Century, Screen Test, Quiz Night, Trivial Pursuit and The Great British Quiz.

== Professional ==
=== Question-setter for Brain of Britain ===
Between 2002 and 2006, Ashman was the question-setter and arbiter on the Radio 4 quiz show Brain of Britain, working under the pen-name of 'Jorkins' (a name taken from David Copperfield). He was appointed to the position on the death of Ian Gillies, who worked under the pen-name 'Mycroft'. He left when production moved to Manchester.

=== Eggheads ===
From November 2003 until April 2023, he competed on the British quiz show Eggheads, teamed up with several other quiz champions, in which members of the public pit their wits against them in order to win a cash prize. Alongside his Egghead teammates, he also took part in the spin-off show Are You an Egghead?, a competition to find further members of the Egghead team, resulting in the addition of Barry Simmons in the first series in 2008 and Pat Gibson in the second series in 2009. For the first ten years and two months of the show, Ashman had never incorrectly answered a history category question; this happened for the first time in January 2014.

== National and international quizzing championships ==
Kevin Ashman
Medal record

Quizzing

Representing England

British Quiz Association
Gold medal – first place	1999	Singles
Gold medal – first place	2000	Singles
Gold medal – first place	2002	Singles

British Championships
Gold medal – first place	2004 Old Trafford	Singles
Gold medal – first place	2005 Altrincham	Singles
Gold medal – first place	2006 Shrewsbury	Singles
Silver medal – second place	2007 Staveley	Singles
Silver medal – second place	2008 Staveley	Singles
Silver medal – second place	2008 Staveley	Pairs
Silver medal – second place	2009 Derby	Singles
Silver medal – second place	2010 Derby	Singles
Gold medal – first place	2011 Lichfield	Singles
Silver medal – second place	2012 Lichfield	Singles
Gold medal – first place	2013 Hilton	Singles
Gold medal – first place	2013 Hilton	Pairs
Silver medal – second place	2014 Rothwell	Singles
Silver medal – second place	2015 Newark	Singles
Silver medal – second place	2016 Coventry	Singles
Gold medal – first place	2017 Coventry	Singles
Gold medal – first place	2017 Coventry	Pairs

World Championships
Gold medal – first place	2004 Old Trafford	Singles
Gold medal – first place	2005 Silverstone	Singles
Gold medal – first place	2006 Newport	Singles
Silver medal – second place	2007 Irthlingborough	Singles
Gold medal – first place	2009 Ludlow	Singles
Silver medal – second place	2010 Peterborough	Singles
Silver medal – second place	2011 Lichfield	Singles
Bronze medal – third place	2013 Masham	Singles
Bronze medal – third place	2014 Surrey	Singles
Silver medal – second place	2015 Burton upon Trent	Singles
Gold medal – first place	2016 Northampton	Singles
Gold medal – first place	2017 Northampton	Singles

European Championships
Gold medal – first place	2004 Ghent	Singles
Gold medal – first place	2004 Ghent	National Team
Gold medal – first place	2005 Tallinn	Singles
Silver medal – second place	2005 Tallinn	National Team
Gold medal – first place	2006 Paris	Singles
Silver medal – second place	2006 Paris	Pairs
Silver medal – second place	2006 Paris	National Team
Gold medal – first place	2006 Paris	Club
Gold medal – first place	2007 Blackpool	National Team
Gold medal – first place	2008 Oslo	Singles
Bronze medal – third place	2008 Oslo	Pairs
Silver medal – second place	2008 Oslo	National Team
Gold medal – first place	2009 Dordrecht	Singles
Bronze medal – third place	2009 Dordrecht	Pairs
Gold medal – first place	2009 Dordrecht	National Team
Gold medal – first place	2010 Derby	Pairs
Gold medal – first place	2010 Derby	National Team
Gold medal – first place	2011 Bruges	Singles
Gold medal – first place	2011 Bruges	Pairs
Gold medal – first place	2012 Tartu	Pairs
Gold medal – first place	2012 Tartu	National Team
Gold medal – first place	2013 Liverpool	Pairs
Gold medal – first place	2013 Liverpool	Club
Gold medal – first place	2013 Liverpool	National Team
Silver medal – second place	2014 Bucharest	Singles
Silver medal – second place	2014 Bucharest	Pairs
Gold medal – first place	2014 Bucharest	National Team
Gold medal – first place	2015 Rotterdam	Pairs
Gold medal – first place	2015 Rotterdam	National Team
Silver medal – second place	2016 Athens	Singles
Gold medal – first place	2016 Athens	Pairs
Gold medal – first place	2016 Athens	National Team
Bronze medal – third place	2016 Athens	Club
Bronze medal – third place	2017 Zagreb	Singles
Gold medal – first place	2017 Zagreb	Pairs
Gold medal – first place	2017 Zagreb	National Team
Silver medal – second place	2018 Venice	Pairs
Bronze medal – third place	2018 Venice	National Team
Silver medal – second place	2019 Sofia	Singles
Gold medal – first place	2019 Sofia	Pairs
Gold medal – first place	2019 Sofia	National Team
Bronze medal – third place	2019 Sofia	Club
Gold medal – first place	2022 Berlin	Pairs
Gold medal – first place	2022 Berlin	Club
Bronze medal – third place	2022 Berlin	National Team
Bronze medal – third place	2023 Torremolinos	National Team

Currently ranked World/European number 1, Ashman has 17 gold, 13 silver and 3 bronze medals from the British, European and World Championships, and has been capped 10 times for the England team, with a record of 7 wins and 3 losses. In addition he has won the British Quizzing Championships seven times, as well as many other tournaments. In 2004 he won the World Quizzing Championships individual competition, a tournament organised by the newly formed International Quizzing Association (IQA), as well as the European Quizzing Championships (organised by the same group) both individually and for nations, in Gent, Belgium.

He then followed up by winning the World Quizzing Championships again in July 2005. He is the first person to retain this title and, for a second year running, he finished ahead of Pat Gibson of Ireland and Nico Pattyn of Belgium. In November 2005 he retained his individual title at the European Quizzing Championships in Tallinn, Estonia. At this event he again captained the England quiz team, this time losing to Belgium in the final. In July 2006 he won the World Quizzing Championships for the third year in succession and followed this in December by again winning the European Quizzing Championships (held near Paris, France). He also won the team title with his team Milhous Warriors, but the English quiz team was once again beaten by the Belgians. In 2007 Ashman lost his World title to Pat Gibson, who narrowly beat him into runner-up spot (a position Gibson himself had occupied for four years). He also lost his European title to Nico Pattyn of Belgium, but he took revenge by regaining the title with the England national team, beating the Belgians in the final at Blackpool. In 2008, in Oslo, this situation was reversed with him being runner-up in the team competition but regaining his singles title. In 2009 he regained the World title, the first player ever to do so, when winning for the 4th time. In 2009 he narrowly missed the British title, losing by a point in a tie-break, to 2008 World Champion Mark Bytheway.

== Domestic competition/Quiz leagues ==
Ashman is a committed quizzer and has three main teams (excluding the Eggheads team on TV). In the QLL he competes with the Allsorts (alongside former Mastermind winner Gavin Fuller) and has won the league on numerous occasions, in the Winchester Quiz League, organised by Peter Byford, he plays for the King Alfred and in national events he plays for the Milhous Warriors. The Milhous Warriors, most of whom are based in Swindon, England, have often emerged victorious in the team elements of events run by Quizzing.co.uk, becoming National Champions at Old Trafford football stadium in 2004 and Silverstone in 2005 as part of those years' UK leg of the World Quizzing Championship event. In 2006 they became the first British team to win the European Team Championship, doing so in Paris. In 2008 they were winners in the final of the Clubs and Institutes (CIU) IDC Freeclaim sponsored national championships.

== Personal life ==
A keen traveller, he lives in Winnall, Winchester in Hampshire. It was revealed on Eggheads on 5 October 2009 that Ashman supports Tottenham Hotspur. He also has an interest in folk music and is a keen theatregoer. He was Peter Kay and Paddy McGuinness' Phone-A-Friend for their appearance on Who Wants to Be a Millionaire? on 12 January 2008.
