= Daphne Fowler =

British game show champion

- Born: Daphne Bradshaw; 5 January 1939 (age 87); Warwick, Warwickshire, England
- Occupations: Secretary; Quiz player
- Known for: Eggheads (2003–2014)
- Spouses: Bernard Hudson (m. 1960; died 1989); Peter Fowler (m. 1990)
- Children: 5

Daphne Fowler (née Bradshaw, previously Hudson; born 5 January 1939) is an English game show champion who has taken part in many televised game shows. She has won many titles, including winning Fifteen to One (twice), Going for Gold and Brain of Britain.

Fowler took part in the gameshow Eggheads, where she was one of the team of seven gameshow champions challenged daily by a new quiz team. Fowler has been described as "Britain's best-known female quiz contestant".

== Early life and career ==
Fowler was born in Warwick, Warwickshire, but moved to Cheriton, Kent aged six where she attended Harcourt County Primary School. She then attended Folkestone Girls Grammar School and the University of Exeter where she took a Degree in Theology. She later worked for the National Westminster Bank as a secretary until she took early retirement, having begun to appear as a contestant on game shows.

== Eggheads ==
Fowler appeared on the British quiz show Eggheads from 2003, a quiz team described on the show as "arguably the most formidable quiz team in the country", and was the oldest member of the team. As of 27 May 2014, Fowler retired from Eggheads, being replaced by the returning CJ de Mooi.

== Quiz game show record ==
Show	Year(s)	Record
Winner Takes All	1979	Appeared in the final but lost.
Bullseye	1982	Appeared with her then husband Bernard: they got to the final round but gambled and lost.
Sale of the Century (UK version)	1983	Winner
Brain of Britain	1983, 1984	
Masterteam	1986	Participated in the team known as the Quidnics.
Sale of the Century (Australian version)	1986	
Sale of the Century (World Championship)	1987	
Going for Gold	1988	Series champion
Sale of the Century (World Championship II)	1988	
Fifteen to One	1989, 2000–2002	Two-time series champion, scored the second highest score of all time (432 out of 433). Bill McKaig was the only person to achieve the highest possible score.
Jeopardy!	1990	Won £2000
Runway	1990	
Brain of Britain	1997	Winner
Masterbrain	1997	Winner
100% Gold	1998	
Whitaker's Almanack Champions' Challenge	1998	Winner
Mastermind Radio Edition	1999	
One to Win	2000	
Eggheads	2003–2014	
