= Christopher Hughes (quiz contestant) =

British quizzer (1947–2025)

Chris Hughes
- Born: Christopher John Hughes; 14 August 1947; Enfield, Middlesex, England
- Died: 29 January 2025 (aged 77); Crewe, Cheshire, England
- Occupations: television personality, train driver, railway worker
- Known for: Eggheads

Christopher John Hughes (14 August 1947 – 29 January 2025) was an English television personality and one of Britain's leading quizzers.

== Early life ==
Hughes was born in Enfield, Middlesex, on 14 August 1947. He was educated at Enfield Grammar School. Hughes worked as a train driver and a railway worker.

== Career ==
Hughes was a winner of Mastermind (1983), International Mastermind (1983) and Brain of Britain, 2005. He is one of only seven people ever to have won both Mastermind and Brain of Britain, the others being Roger Pritchard, Kevin Ashman, Pat Gibson, Geoff Thomas, Ian Bayley, and Clive Dunning. He competed for the Mastermind Club in the Quiz League of London, alongside other former champions and contenders including Ashman.

Hughes also appeared on The Weakest Link on 24 September 2001, and was voted out in the final elimination round without answering a single question incorrectly during the whole show, having been named the strongest link in six of the seven elimination rounds. Host Anne Robinson declared Hughes to be "the best contestant we have had on The Weakest Link" and opted not to use her signature "you are the Weakest Link, goodbye!" catchphrase, instead simply saying "goodbye, Chris". He was a member of the regular panel of quiz experts on the UK television show Eggheads as part of the original lineup. Hughes appeared on the programme for 20 years before making his last appearance in 2023.

== Personal life and death ==
Hughes lived in Crewe, Cheshire. Hughes died at his home in Crewe on 29 January 2025, at the age of 77.

== Bibliography ==
- Hughes, Christopher (1984). The Great Railway Quiz. Newton Abbot: David & Charles. ISBN 0-7153-8596-8.
