= British Quiz Association =

The British Quiz Association (BQA) runs the British Quizzing Championships on the first Saturday in September every year.

== Quiz Championships 1999–2000 ==
In 1999 and 2000, Trevor Montague had run a British Quiz Championships as a sport of the Mind Sports Olympiad.

== BQA 2001 till 2004 ==
The BQA was founded as his brainchild in a Reading Hotel on 10 July 2001. The first chairman was Mastermind club president Tony Dart, Montague was to be the managing director and also present were Mark Labbett and Rob Linham.

The association ran British Championships in 2001–3, but went into a moribund state following resignations of many of the committee.

== Change to Quizzing.co.uk ==
In late 2004, Trevor Parry took over running the organisation but only four people competed in the 2004 event (see link). At the same time, a new British Quizzing Championships has successfully been run by Jane Allen and Chris Jones through quizzing.co.uk (follow the link for more details).

== British Quiz Champions ==
- 1999 – Kevin Ashman
- 2000 – Kevin Ashman
- 2001 – Ian Bayley
- 2002 – Kevin Ashman
- 2003 – John Wilson
- 2004 – Karl Whelan
