= Judith Keppel =

British quiz show contestant (born 1942)

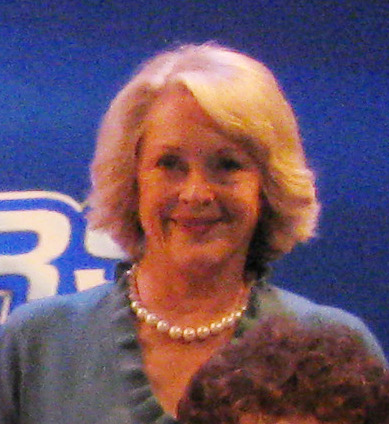
- Keppel in 2008
- Born: Judith Cynthia Aline Keppel; 18 August 1942 (age 83); Wolverhampton, Staffordshire, England
- Known for: First winner of the British television game show Who Wants to Be a Millionaire? in 2000; Eggheads
- Spouses: Desmond Leon Corcoran (m. 1964; div. 1980) Neil Shand (m. 1985; sep. 1987)
- Children: 3
- Parent: Walter Arnold Crispin Keppel (father)
- Relatives: Arnold Keppel, 8th Earl of Albemarle (great-grandfather); Walter, 9th Earl of Albemarle (grandfather); Queen Camilla (third cousin)

Judith Cynthia Aline Keppel (born 18 August 1942) is a British quiz show contestant. In 2000 she became the first person to win one million pounds on the British television game show Who Wants to Be a Millionaire?. She appeared on the BBC Two, and later Channel 5, quiz show Eggheads from its inception in 2003, until she retired from the show in 2022.

== Early life ==
Keppel was born in Wolverhampton, the eldest of three children and only daughter of the Hon. Walter Arnold Crispian Keppel (1914–1996), DSC, and Aline Lucy (1918–2007), daughter of Brigadier-General John Harington, CB, CMG, of Chelmarsh Hall, Bridgnorth, Shropshire (son of Sir Richard Harington, 11th Baronet) and Lady Frances Aline, daughter of William Temple-Gore-Langton, 4th Earl Temple of Stowe. Walter Keppel was a lieutenant commander in the Royal Navy's Fleet Air Arm.

The family moved around, due to various naval postings, before settling in London when Keppel was seventeen. She sat A-Levels at St Mary's School, Wantage, and then completed a secretarial course.

Keppel is a granddaughter of Walter Keppel, 9th Earl of Albemarle. Her great-grandfather, Arnold Keppel, the 8th Earl, was the brother of George Keppel, the brother-in-law of Alice Keppel (a mistress of King Edward VII) and a great-great-uncle of Queen Camilla of the United Kingdom, who is thus her third cousin. Through her grandfather, her ancestors include Eleanor of Aquitaine and Henry II of England, who were the subjects of her one-million-pound question on Who Wants to Be a Millionaire?.

== TV quiz shows ==
Keppel's £1 million question

Who Wants to Be a Millionaire? – £1 million (question 15 of 15)

Which king was married to Eleanor of Aquitaine?

1. Henry I
2. Henry II(correct answer)
3. Richard I
4. Henry V

Keppel appeared on the 20 November 2000 episode of the UK edition of Who Wants to Be a Millionaire?, becoming the 12th winner in the world and the first in the UK to win one million pounds. At the time, she was a garden designer living in Fulham and was "struggling for money". Nonetheless, she had spent about £100 phoning the quiz show more than 50 times to secure a place. "BT rang me up and said, 'Do you realise your telephone bills are rising?'"

There was speculation at the time that the win was leaked to the press so that ITV would draw ratings away from BBC One, which was showing the last episode of One Foot in the Grave in the same timeslot. However, the Independent Television Commission cleared Celador and ITV of the allegations.

Keppel formerly appeared, from 2003 until her retirement in 2022, on the Channel 5 quiz show Eggheads, as part of a team of quiz champions pitted against a team of members of the public. She made a reappearance in 2023 for the 2000th episode.

== Personal life ==
In 1964, Keppel married her first husband, Desmond Leon Corcoran, an art dealer with whom she had three children, Sibylla, Alexander, and Rosie, but they divorced in 1980. In 1985, she married comedy scriptwriter Neil Shand. They were separated in 1987.

Preceded by First winner	Top prize winner on Who Wants to Be a Millionaire? (UK); 20 November 2000	Succeeded by David Edwards
