= C. J. de Mooi =

British television personality

CJ de Mooi
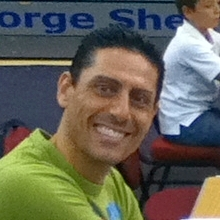
- De Mooi in 2011
- Born: Andrew Paul Booth; 5 November 1969 (age 56); Barnsley, West Riding of Yorkshire, England
- Occupations: Television personality; actor; writer; quiz contestant
- Website: demooi.co.uk

Connagh Joseph "CJ" de Mooi (pronounced [də ˈmoːi]; born Andrew Paul Booth on 5 November 1969) is a British actor, writer, former professional quizzer and television personality. He first appeared on the television quiz show Eggheads in 2003, as one of the five original members of the show's eponymous team.

== Early life ==
External videos
- CJ de Mooi on homelessness, 15:49, 15 August 2013
- 2016, CJ de Mooi, 8:26, 16 December 2016 Material about Wikipedia begins at 4:37

In his autobiography, De Mooi states that he was given the names Andrew Paul at his birth in Barnsley, Yorkshire. He moved to Rotherham in his childhood, and attended a local comprehensive school. De Mooi studied English and Performing Arts at Rotherham College of Arts and Technology before embarking upon a modelling career in Germany which lasted for four and a half years.

On a self-recorded YouTube video, De Mooi said he had a highly abusive childhood, causing him to run away from home shortly after his seventeenth birthday and become homeless beginning in Rotherham and Sheffield. While he was homeless, he turned to prostitution. Later in the video, De Mooi talked about how he travelled to London, jumped on a ferry to Amsterdam and later moved on to Cologne, where a chance encounter outside a gay bar led to the beginnings of his modelling career. De Mooi states that his parents took him to see a psychiatrist as a child. This psychiatrist diagnosed De Mooi as a fantasist and accused him of lying and being an attention seeker.

According to De Mooi, he adopted his new name while modelling and is quoted as saying "I no longer wanted to be associated with my family". De Mooi translates from Dutch as "handsome".

== Career ==
=== Quizzer ===
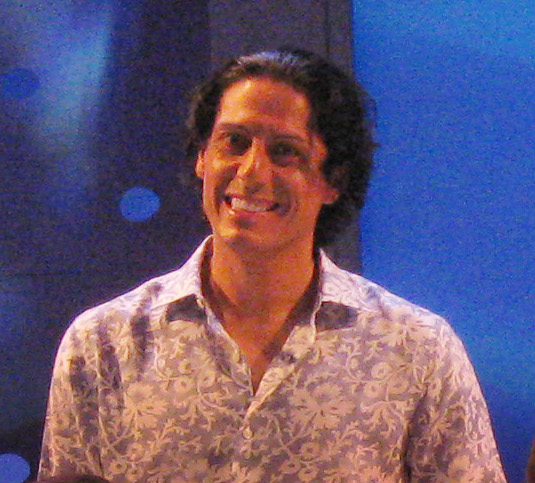
De Mooi on Eggheads

In 2000, De Mooi applied to several game and quiz television shows as a contestant and stood out for being outspoken. (His tirade when voted off the The Weakest Link has been featured on the show's website, video and led to a "bad losers" show which he eventually won) He has also appeared on numerous other quiz shows including Fifteen to One, Countdown, Beat the Nation and 100%.

He challenged six former professional snooker players during the 2010 World Snooker Championship to test his snooker knowledge against their knowledge of chosen specialist subjects. He won all but one round, John Parrott being the only player to get the better of him.

As part of the Cardiff Lesbian, Gay, Bisexual and Transgender Mardi Gras in March 2007, De Mooi acted as host of a quiz night. He also hosted a quiz at the June 2010 conference of the British Humanist Association. In 2013, De Mooi published his first book, entitled How to Win TV Quiz Shows.

In December 2011, De Mooi announced he had left Eggheads permanently to pursue an acting career. He later stated that he was dismissed from Eggheads and relocated to South Africa. He appeared in broadcast episodes until August 2012 and was replaced on the show by Dave Rainford. However, he returned to a new, short-lived format of Eggheads in 2014 called Revenge of the Egghead. He stated he returned because of his 'love of the show'. He then returned to the main version of Eggheads replacing Daphne Fowler.

=== Chess ===
De Mooi was a club chess player from 1990 to 2009, representing Hammersmith Chess Club in West London. At the peak his chess rating was 158 ECF, equivalent to Elo 1885. In 2010 he was elected President of the English Chess Federation.

In September 2010 he was very outspoken as a delegate to the FIDE (the World Chess Federation)'s presidential elections. De Mooi described the events which saw Kirsan Ilyumzhinov re-elected over Anatoly Karpov as "a farce of a vote", going on to declare: "You wouldn't believe the blatant breaking of rules and FIDE's written statutes. It's amazing. There wasn't even a pretence of fairness and free speech." According to De Mooi, Ilyumzhinov, the federation's president for 15 years, had refused to allow Karpov's supporters to address the general assembly meeting, but turned off their microphones and carried on speaking himself and ignored legal points raised from the floor, eventually storming off stage with the federation's ruling board.

=== Acting ===
In 2014, de Mooi performed in and produced two plays by Harvey Fierstein in London's West End and was then cast in the Lazarus Theatre productions of Troilus and Cressida and Coriolanus. He also completed filming on his movie debut, a nine-minute short entitled The Renata Road, which was filmed in 2011 and put out on release in 2014 with a showing at Cannes International Film Festival in 2015.

=== Writing ===
De Mooi announced in 2021 that he had started working on a new television sitcom, which he would be writing and producing. In February, the title of the show was announced to be Together. Plot details are not known at present, but De Mooi has described it as "a modern twist on a classic sitcom scenario". The show, which was set to film its pilot in July 2021, was set to star Ewen MacIntosh, John Challis (who died in September 2021), and Sally Thomsett, making her first appearance on screen since 1978.

== Personal life ==
De Mooi is gay. He resides in Wales with his civil partner Andrew Doran. De Mooi is teetotal and a vegetarian of over three decades; in April 2018 he announced on Twitter he was going vegan.

De Mooi has been living with HIV since the late 1980s. In April 2019, De Mooi posted on Twitter about his health and about his financial and professional problems and a GoFundMe campaign was launched, saying he is "bankrupt, extremely ill and in imminent danger of losing his house." He also claimed that he was "dying from AIDS" and didn't expect to live long.

In 2015, De Mooi accused TV show Strictly Come Dancing of rejecting him as a contestant in favour of Jeremy Vine, due to De Mooi wanting a same-sex dance partner. The BBC released a statement saying that "Strictly is a family show and we have chosen the traditional format of mixed-sex couples." In 2019, Strictly Come Dancing began to use same-sex dance partners.

=== Arrest ===
De Mooi stated in his autobiography that in 1988 he punched a man who was attempting to mug him and shoved him into a canal in Amsterdam. He said: "I fully suspect I killed him. I've no idea what happened to him."

On 21 September 2016, De Mooi was arrested at Heathrow Airport in connection with the claims, and detained under a European Arrest Warrant issued in the Netherlands. A judge at Westminster Magistrates' Court declined the extradition request on technical grounds on 24 October 2016, saying that no UK arrest warrant had been issued.

In October 2018, De Mooi was declared bankrupt following lengthy legal proceedings in connection with the arrest.

=== Charity ===
De Mooi ran in the 2009 London Marathon, raising money for Amnesty International. He also competed in the 2012 London Marathon, completing with a time of 3 hours, 16 minutes and 30 seconds.

In 2015 he ran in the London Marathon for Shooting Star CHASE, a children's hospice, finishing in 2 hours, 58 minutes and 30 seconds.

== Books ==
- CJ de Mooi: How to Win TV Quiz Shows, CreateSpace Independent Publishing Platform, 25 July 2013
- CJ de Mooi: CJ: The Autobiography of CJ de Mooi: My Journey From the Streets to the Screens; John Blake Publishing, 3 September 2015
- CJ de Mooi and Mark Labbett: Quiz Like a Pro! Amazon Kindle, 6 June 2016
- CJ de Mooi: Dispersal, Amazon Kindle, 8 June 2016

Unknown	President of the English Chess Federation; 2010–2012	Succeeded by Roger Edwards
