= Quiz League of London =

British quiz league

The Quiz League of London (QLL) is a British quiz league based in London. Founded in 1990 as the Quiz League of South London, it was southern England's first independent self-administered quiz league. The matches themselves are mostly hosted at pubs or social clubs, though the COVID-19 pandemic forced the league to play its matches online. The following season (2021-22) saw a return to matches in person.

== History ==
The QLL has since incorporated many teams from the Greater London area, and currently (2025–26) has 53 Winter League teams across five divisions. The QLL runs the annual London Open Quiz Festival, which features a knockout competition between other quiz leagues from up and down the country and an annual open buzzer quiz using the University Challenge format.

The QLL also runs a President's Cup league competition aimed at the top players, a Summer Friendly League designed to be a bit less challenging, a knockout Cup and Plate competition, the Brain of London (an individual competition using the MIMIR format), a charity night, and a summer social. Players in the QLL include previous Mastermind, Brain of Britain, and Only Connect winners and other television and radio quiz winners. The only founder member club of the original four teams extant in the QLL is Atletico (original name being Manor Arms).

== Team format ==
Two teams (one home, one away) play each other, responding orally to a questionmaster.

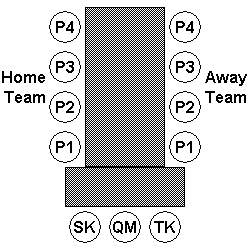
Positions for a typical league quiz played in the QLL, SK=Scorekeeper, QM=Questionmaster, TK=timekeeper

The QLL format consists of 64 questions in 8 rounds of 8 questions each, asked to individuals on the teams alternately. Correctly answering your own question scores 2 points, though it can be passed within the team (if the player chooses not to answer) or over to the other team (if the player or team answer wrongly or choose not to answer) for 1 point.

In the QLL format, there is no conferring as such. Where a player decides not to answer their question, the team captain will normally decide which other member of the team is to answer. The opposition will also decide who is to answer the question in the event of it being passed over. After 4 rounds, the order of answering changes, so the team who began round 1 going first begin round 5 going second. This is done by switching each team's questions from A to B or from B to A depending on which questions they started with.

In league competitions, a win scores 4 points, a draw scores 2 points and a close defeat (losing by 3 points or fewer) scores 1 point. In addition, if all four members of a team get all of their own questions correct in any given round (a "full house"), an additional bonus point is scored.

In knockout competitions where a draw is not permitted, an additional ninth round of questions is played. If the scores are still tied at the end of the ninth round, a tie-breaker is played.

== Individual format ==
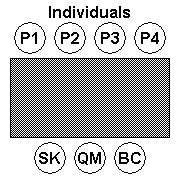
Positions for a typical individual quiz played in the QLL, SK=Scorekeeper, QM=Questionmaster, BC=Bonus counter

Many quiz leagues run individual competitions. QLL uses the MIMIR quiz format (named after Mímir, a god of Norse mythology who was renowned for his knowledge and wisdom). Matches are played in groups of four with positions drawn at random and each person has three questions addressed to them, in each of five rounds.

Time to answer a directed question is 30 seconds, but a wrong answer or a pass gives any of the other three an opportunity to score a bonus point. The decision as to who gets the first chance to answer for a bonus is determined by offering the question to whoever, at that stage, has made fewest attempts to gain bonus points or, if there is more than one player who has made the fewest bonus attempts, the next player in line (e.g. if this happened on the first question, P2 would have the first option on a bonus attempt). Previously, a separate bonus counter was needed to track each player's bonus attempts, which was a very demanding task. With the advent of QLL's in-house online scoresheet, this is handled automatically as part of the scoring process, meaning that a separate bonus counter is no longer required. For the 2023 competition, functionality was added to the scoring system whereby the text and answers are shown on screen to the reader, thereby allowing individual quizzes to be run by a single official.

== Online quiz delivery ==
For the first 22 years of the league's existence, quizzes were printed out and posted to each venue via snail mail. This was generally successful, though inevitably quizzes got 'lost in the post' and the process incurred a significant surcharge on the cost of the quizzes themselves. Therefore, in 2013, QLL introduced a mechanism for electronic delivery of quizzes. For this, each quiz was saved as a PDF document encrypted with a 16/18-digit password. These quizzes were downloaded from a separate website (not part of the main QLL website and not owned by QLL) and, 30 minutes before the match start time, half of the password is texted to the home team captain and the other half to the away team captain. The quiz was opened just before the match start time in the presence of both teams.

== Online scoring ==
For the first 20 years of the league's existence, scoring was done manually on paper sheets. This process was prone to human error so, in 2012, QLL introduced an administration site where QLL admins could enter the scoresheets directly into the database, which would highlight errors in the sheets for subsequent remediation. This eliminated virtually all scoring errors, but was still a time-consuming process. Therefore, in 2019, the league introduced online scoresheets for all of its quizzes in the team quiz format. This means that teams can do their own scoring and submit their own sheets live which, in turn, not only eliminates virtually all human errors but also updates the league tables and stats engine in real time. In 2020, an online buzzer quiz scoresheet was developed and in 2021 an online scoresheet was developed for Brain of London (MIMIR). In addition, online scoresheets are available for non-competitive matches in the four standard QLL formats (team, MIMIR, buzzer, chocolate box) for use in friendly matches.

== Integrated score sheets and quizzes ==
For the 2023-24 season, the league introduced a mechanism whereby quizzes can be imported directly into the individual (MIMIR) online score sheet, thereby eliminating the need to have separate readers, scorers, timekeepers and bonus counters. This was extended to the buzzer quiz and chocolate box formats for the 2024-25 season and, finally, for team quizzes during the 2025 Summer Friendly League, meaning that the delivery of quizzes in PDF format could finally be abandoned.
