= 2021 Quiz Olympiad =

International quizzing competition

- Host city: Kraków
- Country: Poland
- Nations: 24
- Debuting countries: 4
- Athletes: 182
- Events: 44
- Opening: 11 November 2021
- Closing: 14 November 2021
- Website: quizolympiad.com

Organised by the International Quizzing Association and held from 11 to 14 November 2021, the 2021 Quiz Olympiad in Kraków was the second Quiz Olympiad. The event was planned to take place from 5 November 2020 until 8 November 2020, but was postponed a year due to the COVID-19 pandemic.

== Event ==
The event hosted quizzes that combined awarded 132 medals

=== Quizzes ===
The following were the official quizzes at the 2021 Quiz Olympiad:

- Individual Quiz
- Nations Team Quiz
- Pairs Quiz
- History Quiz
- Sport Quiz
- Literature Quiz
- Business Quiz
- Sciences Quiz
- Digital Quiz
- Visual Arts Quiz
- Television Quiz
- Geography Quiz
- Film Quiz
- Performing Arts Quiz
- Pop Music Quiz
- Pentathlon Specialist Quiz
- National Specialist Quiz
- High Brow Specialist Quiz
- Populist Special Quiz
- Speed Quiz
- Knockout Quiz
- Under 30 Individual Quiz
- Under 30 National Team Quiz
- Under 30 Pairs Quiz

Some quizzes have similar standing with IOC demonstration sports. These were awarded medals, but do not feature on the overall medals table:

- Aspirational Team Quiz
- World Club Team Quiz
- Frankenquiz

== Participants ==
There were 182 participants from 24 nations at the 2021 Quiz Olympiad. Some notable participants include Nico Pattyn, Ronny Swiggers, and Tom Trogh of Belgium; Dorjana Širola of Croatia; Ian Bayley of England; Tero Kalliolevo of Finland; Sebastian Klussmann of Germany; Barry Simmons of Scotland; and Shane Whitlock of the United States.

Participating nations
- Australia (1)
- Austria (6)
- Belgium (19)
- Bulgaria (1)
- Croatia (11)
- Denmark (9)
- England (11)
- Estonia (7)
- Finland (1)
- France (6)
- Germany (17)
- India (1)
- Ireland (4)
- Liberia (7)
- Netherlands (8)
- Norway (24)
- Poland (4)
- Portugal (5)
- Romania (9)
- Scotland (6)
- Sweden (3)
- Switzerland (5)
- United States (15)
- Wales (2)

Full list of participants
- (Australia) Rick Bakker
- (Austria) Andreas Stolz
- (Austria) Astrid Rief
- (Austria) Johannes Eibl
- (Austria) Nicholas Martin
- (Austria) Robert Rees
- (Austria) Stefan Pletzer
- (Belgium) Adriaan Dierick
- (Belgium) Bruno De Laet
- (Belgium) Derk de Graaf
- (Belgium) Dries Van De Sande
- (Belgium) Gert-Jan Dugardein
- (Belgium) Ivo Geyskens
- (Belgium) Jens Everaerdt
- (Belgium) Johnny Loodts
- (Belgium) Kris van der Coelden
- (Belgium) Lander Frederickx
- (Belgium) Luc Lenaerts
- (Belgium) Nico Pattyn
- (Belgium) Paul Arts
- (Belgium) Roeland De Geest
- (Belgium) Ronny Swiggers
- (Belgium) Stijn Gyselinckx
- (Belgium) Tim van der Heyden
- (Belgium) Tom Trogh
- (Belgium) Yarnick Piscador
- (Bulgaria) Plamen Mladenov
- (Croatia) Dean Kotiga
- (Croatia) Domagoj Pozderac
- (Croatia) Dorjana Širola
- (Croatia) Krešimir Štimac
- (Croatia) Kresimir Sucevic Mederal
- (Croatia) Lovro Jurišić
- (Croatia) Mario Kovač
- (Croatia) Morana Zibar
- (Croatia) Neven Trgovec
- (Croatia) Perica Živanović
- (Croatia) Petra Lypolt
- (Denmark) Anders Pedersen
- (Denmark) Anton Jacobsen
- (Denmark) Esben Christiansen
- (Denmark) Glen Odgaard
- (Denmark) Flemming Borg Nielsen
- (Denmark) Jacob Senius
- (Denmark) Mads Theodorsen
- (Denmark) Maj-Britt Christensen
- (Denmark) Rasmus Jørgensen
- (England) Amit De
- (England) Daoud Jackson
- (England) Derek O’Neill
- (England) Duncan McDonald
- (England) Ian Bayley
- (England) Ian Clark
- (England) Martin Webb
- (England) Matt Todd
- (England) Ned Pendleton
- (England) Pamela Douglas
- (England) Timothy Westcott
- (Estonia) Igor Habal
- (Estonia) Illar Tõnisson
- (Estonia) Indrek Salis
- (Estonia) Kaarel Silmato
- (Estonia) Mati Räli
- (Estonia) Ove Põder
- (Estonia) Tauno Vahter
- (Finland) Tero Kalliolevo
- (France) Celine Marlot
- (France) Didier Bruyere
- (France) Frederic Faucheux
- (France) Jerome Vachet
- (France) Max Fitz-James
- (France) Vincent Rousset
- (Germany) Andreas Herde
- (Germany) Andy Östreich
- (Germany) Annegret Schenkel
- (Germany) Dirk Vielhuber
- (Germany) Florian Dirr
- (Germany) Holger Waldenberger
- (Germany) Jürgen Stelter
- (Germany) Manuel Hobiger
- (Germany) Mario Abel
- (Germany) Max Lüggert
- (Germany) Pascal Bothe
- (Germany) Peter Meiners
- (Germany) Roland Knauff
- (Germany) Rudi Mewes
- (Germany) Sebastian Klussmann
- (Germany) Thorsten Zirkel
- (Germany) Vanessa Engelhardt
- (India) Abhinav Kishore
- (Republic of Ireland) Eva Barrett
- (Republic of Ireland) Kevin Jones
- (Republic of Ireland) Mark Henry
- (Republic of Ireland) Patrick Carthy
- (Liberia) Grace N. Cole
- (Liberia) Jonathan Z. Saye
- (Liberia) Madison S. Mondah
- (Liberia) Otis B. Kruah
- (Liberia) Phil Tarpeh Dixon
- (Liberia) Philip H. Roberts
- (Liberia) Smaila Kiazolu
- (Netherlands) Devrim Aslan
- (Netherlands) Diederick van Elst
- (Netherlands) Guido ter Stege
- (Netherlands) John van Maris
- (Netherlands) Marcel Visschers
- (Netherlands) Maurice van Maris
- (Netherlands) Michael-Dennis Biemans
- (Netherlands) Paul Uijen
- (Norway) Aldona Szczepanska
- (Norway) Arild Tørum
- (Norway) Dag Olav Rønning
- (Norway) Eivind Moskvil
- (Norway) Eskil Åsmul
- (Norway) Espen Iversen
- (Norway) Espen Kibsgård
- (Norway) Geir H. Kristiansen
- (Norway) Ivar Areklett
- (Norway) Jan-Egil Aakernes
- (Norway) Jon Inge Kolden
- (Norway) Jørgen Skjånes
- (Norway) Lars Erik Brandt Rustad
- (Norway) Lars Heggland
- (Norway) Leif-Atle Heen
- (Norway) Knut Heggland
- (Norway) Mats Sigstad
- (Norway) Odd Rune Heggheim
- (Norway) Ole Martin Halck
- (Norway) Øystein Aadnevik
- (Norway) Thomas Kolåsæter
- (Norway) Tore Heliks Van Dahl
- (Norway) Toril Opsahl
- (Norway) Sonja Sirnes
- (Poland) Bartosz Śliwicki
- (Poland) Marzena Szymanowska-Pietrzyk
- (Poland) Piotr Łoboda
- (Poland) Tomasz Orzechowski
- (Portugal) André Ascensão
- (Portugal) Jorge Páramos
- (Portugal) José André
- (Portugal) Rodrigo Castro
- (Portugal) Sofia Santos
- (Romania) Alina Teodoru
- (Romania) Dragos Beligan
- (Romania) Eduard Stan
- (Romania) Emil Chifor
- (Romania) Marcian Istrate
- (Romania) Marius Tudor
- (Romania) Mihai-Alexandru Ilioaia
- (Romania) Nicu Perojuc
- (Romania) Traian Rotarescu
- (Scotland) Barry Simmons
- (Scotland) Galen Chung
- (Scotland) Jack Pollock
- (Scotland) Mark Rae
- (Scotland) Rob Sutherland
- (Scotland) Roderick Cromar
- (Sweden) David Högberg
- (Sweden) Jonas von Essen
- (Sweden) Nora Falk
- (Switzerland) Andreas Kröll
- (Switzerland) Philipp Rohrer
- (Switzerland) Prakhar Gupta
- (Switzerland) Rajan Thambehalli
- (Switzerland) Renate Schär
- (United States) Alan Lin
- (United States) Brandon Blackwell
- (United States) Carlo Aiello
- (United States) Clifford Galiher
- (United States) David Legler
- (United States) Henry Herron
- (United States) Jakob Myers
- (United States) Jeffrey Seguritan
- (United States) Kathryn Verwillow
- (United States) Leonard Fahrni
- (United States) Mark Ryder
- (United States) Matt Jackson
- (United States) Paul Bailey
- (United States) Raj Dhuwalia
- (United States) Shane Whitlock
- (Wales) David Cowan
- (Wales) Sean O’Neill

== Medalists ==
The results were:

Event	Gold	Silver	Bronze
Individual Quiz	(Republic of Ireland) Mark Henry	(Belgium) Ronny Swiggers	(Finland) Tero Kalliolevo
Pairs Quiz	(Belgium) Ronny Swiggers (Finland) Tero Kalliolevo	(Belgium) Nico Pattyn (Belgium) Jens Everaerdt	(Belgium) Tom Trogh (Belgium) Derk de Graaf
Nations Team Quiz	Belgium; Nico Pattyn; Tom Trogh; Lander Frederickx; Ronny Swiggers	Estonia; Igor Habal; Ove Põder; Kaarel Silmato; Illar Tõnisson	USA; Raj Dhuwalia; Jakob Myers; Matt Jackson; Shane Whitlock
History Quiz	(Belgium) Nico Pattyn (United States) Jakob Myers	not awarded (tie for gold)	(United States) Matt Jackson
Sport Quiz	(Belgium) Bruno De Laet	(Belgium) Tom Trogh (Belgium) Dries Van De Sande	not awarded (tie for silver)
Literature Quiz	(England) Daoud Jackson (Norway) Ole Martin Halck	not awarded (tie for gold)	(United States) Matt Jackson
Business Quiz	(Germany) Sebastian Klussmann	(Belgium) Tom Trogh	(Denmark) Anton Jacobsen (Belgium) Derk de Graaf
Sciences Quiz	(England) Ian Bayley	(United States) Raj Dhuwalia	(Scotland) Jack Pollock (United States) Matt Jackson (Belgium) Lander Frederickx
Digital Quiz	(Belgium) Tom Trogh	(Netherlands) Michael-Dennis Biemans	(United States) Brandon Blackwell (Austria) Johannes Eibl
Visual Arts Quiz	(Belgium) Ronny Swiggers	(Croatia) Domagoj Pozderac	(England) Ian Bayley
Television Quiz	(Norway) Espen Iversen	(Norway) Sonja Sirnes (Croatia) Krešimir Štimac (Scotland) Galen Chung (Norway) Arild Tørum (Belgium) Stijn Gyselinckx	not awarded (tie for silver)
Geography Quiz	(Belgium) Paul Arts (Estonia) Ove Põder	not awarded (tie for gold)	(United States) Jakob Myers (United States) Shane Whitlock
Film Quiz	(United States) Clifford Galiher	(Norway) Leif-Atle Heen (Croatia) Krešimir Štimac	not awarded (tie for silver)
Performing Arts Quiz	(England) Daoud Jackson	(England) Ian Bayley	(United States) Matt Jackson
Pop Music Quiz	(Belgium) Lander Frederickx	(Estonia) Igor Habal	(Belgium) Tom Trogh
Pentathlon Specialist Quiz	(Belgium) Tom Trogh	(United States) Matt Jackson	(England) Ian Bayley
National Specialist Quiz	Belgium; Ronny Swiggers; Tom Trogh; Nico Pattyn; Dries Van De Sande; Stijn Gyselinckx; Paul Arts; Lander Frederickx; Bruno De Laet	Norway; Ole Martin Halck; Leif-Atle Heen; Espen Iversen; Geir H. Kristiansen; Lars Heggland; Tore Heliks Van Dahl; Mats Sigstad	USA; Matt Jackson; Clifford Galiher; Brandon Blackwell; Jakob Myers; Alan Lin; Kathryn Verwillow; Raj Dhuwalia; Shane Whitlock
High Brow Specialist Quiz	(United States) Matt Jackson	(England) Ian Bayley	(England) Daoud Jackson
Populist Specialist Quiz	(Belgium) Tom Trogh	(Croatia) Krešimir Štimac	(Belgium) Lander Frederickx
Speed Quiz	(United States) Alan Lin	(Belgium) Tom Trogh (United States) Brandon Blackwell	not awarded (tie for silver)
Knockout Quiz	(Estonia) Kaarel Silmato	(Estonia) Illar Tõnisson	(Estonia) Ove Põder
Under 30 Individual Quiz	(England) Daoud Jackson	(Belgium) Lander Frederickx	(Croatia) Krešimir Štimac
Under 30 Nations Team Quiz	Belgium; Dries Van De Sande; Gert-Jan Dugardein; Roeland De Geest; Tim Van der Heyden	USA; Brandon Blackwell; Alan Lin; Carlo Aiello; Aidan Leahy	not awarded (only two teams competing)
Under 30 Pairs Quiz	(Belgium) Dries Van De Sande (Belgium) Lander Frederickx	(Croatia) Krešimir Štimac (Croatia) Neven Trgovec	(France) Max Fitz-James (France) Vincent Rousset

Event	Gold	Silver	Bronze
World Club Team Quiz	JFDDGI (Finland) Tero Kalliolevo (Estonia) Ove Põder (Estonia) Kaarel Silmato (Estonia) Tauno Vahter	The Rolling Scones (Croatia) Dean Kotiga (United States) Shane Whitlock (England) Daoud Jackson (Croatia) Neven Trgovec	Sage Supercilia (Germany) Sebastian Klussmann (Estonia) Igor Habal (United States) Mark Ryder (Republic of Ireland) Mark Henry
Aspirational Cup	LucV Forever (Belgium) Paul Arts (Belgium) Jens Everaerdt (Belgium) Kris Van der Coelden (Finland) Tero Kalliolevo	Norway B Lars Heggland; Arild Tørum; Espen Kibsgård; Mats Sigstad	Popular People's Front of Judea (Belgium) Stijn Gyselinckx (Belgium) Ivo Geyskens (Belgium) Luc Lenaerts (Belgium) Johnny Loodts
Frankenquiz	Only here for the beer (England) Tim Westcott (England) Ian Clark (Wales) David Cowan (England) Matt Todd	4 Handsomes (England) Ned Pendleton (England) Daoud Jackson (Croatia) Dean Kotiga (Croatia) Neven Trgovec	FW de Klerk, more like FW de Funct (United States) Matt Jackson (United States) Jakob Myers (United States) Dave Legler (United States) Aidan Leahy

== Medal table ==
The total medal table was:

Rank	Nation	Gold	Silver	Bronze	Total
1	Belgium (BEL)	13.25	8	5	26.25
2	England	4.75	2.75	3.75	11.25
3	United States (USA)	4	4.25	10.5	18.75
4	Estonia (EST)	2.75	3	1.25	7
5	Norway (NOR)	2	5	0	7
6	Finland (FIN)	1	0	1	2
7	Germany (GER)	1	0	0.25	1.25
7	Ireland (IRL)	1	0	0.25	1.25
9	Wales	0.25	0	0	0.25
10	Croatia (CRO)	0	6	1	7
11	Scotland	0	1	1	2
12	Netherlands (NED)	0	1	0	1
13	Austria (AUT)	0	0	1	1
13	Denmark (DEN)	0	0	1	1
13	France (FRA)	0	0	1	1
Totals (15 entries)		30	31	27	88
