= 2024 Quiz Olympiad =

Quiz competition in Spain

- Host city: Fuengirola
- Country: Spain
- Nations: 24
- Debuting countries: 1
- Athletes: 226
- Opening: 7 November 2024
- Closing: 10 November 2024
- Website: quizolympiad.com

Organised by the International Quizzing Association and held from 7 to 10 November 2024, the 2024 Quiz Olympiad in Fuengirola was the third Quiz Olympiad.

The event also counts as the 2024 International Quizzing Championships.

== Event ==
The event hosted quizzes that combined awarded 135 medals

=== Quizzes ===
The following were the official quizzes at the 2024 Quiz Olympiad:

- Individual Quiz
- Nations Team Quiz
- Pairs Quiz
- U30 Individual Quiz
- U30 Nations Team Quiz
- Sciences Quiz
- Film Quiz
- History Quiz
- Digital World Quiz
- Literature Quiz
- Food & Drink Quiz
- Visual Arts Quiz
- Sport Quiz
- Geography Quiz
- Television Quiz
- Nature Quiz
- Pop Music Quiz
- Pentathlon Specialist Quiz
- National Specialist Quiz
- High Brow Specialist Quiz
- Populist Special Quiz
- World Club Team Quiz
- Knockout Quiz

Some quizzes have similar standing with IOC demonstration sports. These were awarded medals, but do not feature on the overall medals table:

- Aspirational Team Quiz
- Frankenquiz

== Participants ==
There were 227 participants from 24 nations at the 2024 Quiz Olympiad. Some notable participants include Issa Schultz of Australia; Nico Pattyn, Ronny Swiggers, and Tom Trogh of Belgium; Dean Kotiga of Croatia; Pat Gibson and Paul Sinha of England; Tero Kalliolevo of Finland; Sebastian Jacoby and Sebastian Klussmann of Germany; Anne Hegerty and Barry Simmons of Scotland; and Victoria Groce of the United States.

Participating nations
- Australia (7)
- Austria (2)
- Belgium (23)
- Canada (3)
- Croatia (9)
- Denmark (9)
- England (22)
- Estonia (5)
- Finland (2)
- France (1)
- Germany (21)
- Hungary (6)
- Ireland (4)
- Liberia (9)
- Netherlands (15)
- Norway (23)
- Poland (2)
- Romania (8)
- Scotland (12)
- Serbia (8)
- Sweden (1)
- Switzerland (4)
- United States (23)
- Wales (7)

Full list of participants
- (Australia) Aaran Mohann
- (Australia) Alexander Vosten
- (Australia) Issa Schultz
- (Australia) Marc Cheong
- (Australia) Mick Logue
- (Australia) Rick Bakker
- (Australia) Ross Evans
- (Austria) Andreas Stolz
- (Austria) Claudia Lösch
- (Belgium) Bart Lecomte
- (Belgium) Derk de Graaf
- (Belgium) Dries Van De Sande
- (Belgium) Gert-Jan Dugardein
- (Belgium) Jo Broos
- (Belgium) Johnny Loodts
- (Belgium) Kris Van Der Coelden
- (Belgium) Lander Frederickx
- (Belgium) Lars Van Moer
- (Belgium) Luc Lenaerts
- (Belgium) Maurice D’hiet
- (Belgium) Nico Pattyn
- (Belgium) Paul Arts
- (Belgium) Pieter Poelaert
- (Belgium) Ronny Swiggers
- (Belgium) Stijn Gyselinckx
- (Belgium) Sven Lefèvre
- (Belgium) Thomas De Bock
- (Belgium) Tim Van der Heyden
- (Belgium) Tom Trogh
- (Belgium) Warre Van den Eynde
- (Belgium) Wim Vanrie
- (Belgium) Yarnick Piscador
- (Canada) Adam Hancock
- (Canada) Lee Ann Whitlock
- (Canada) Paul Paquet
- (Croatia) Dean Kotiga
- (Croatia) Ivan Juric
- (Croatia) Krešimir Melnik
- (Croatia) Lovro Jurišić
- (Croatia) Mario Kovac
- (Croatia) Neven Trgovec
- (Croatia) Perica Zivanovic
- (Croatia) Šime Gverić
- (Croatia) Slaven Maros
- (Denmark) Anders Pedersen
- (Denmark) Anton Jacobsen
- (Denmark) Esben Christiansen
- (Denmark) Esben Holdt
- (Denmark) Flemming Borg Nielsen
- (Denmark) Glen Odgaard
- (Denmark) Mads Theodorsen
- (Denmark) Maj-Britt Christensen
- (Denmark) Søren Brøndum Laursen
- (England) Amit De
- (England) Andrew Johnston
- (England) Andrew Whittingham
- (England) Ben Vincent
- (England) Daoud Jackson
- (England) Evan Lynch
- (England) George Scratcherd
- (England) Gerard Mackay
- (England) Hugh Bennett
- (England) Ian Bayley
- (England) Ian Clark
- (England) Matt Todd
- (England) Miles Burton
- (England) Ned Pendleton
- (England) Oliver Levy
- (England) Pamela Douglas
- (England) Pat Gibson
- (England) Paul Bazzone
- (England) Paul Sinha
- (England) Sarah Trevarthen
- (England) Steve Lilley
- (England) Toby Cox
- (Estonia) Igor Habal
- (Estonia) Illar Tõnisson
- (Estonia) Indrek Salis
- (Estonia) Kaarel Silmato
- (Estonia) Ove Põder
- (Finland) Leslie Shannon
- (Finland) Tero Kalliolevo
- (France) Frédéric Faucheux
- (Germany) Andy Östreich
- (Germany) Annegret Schenkel
- (Germany) Christoph Wötzel
- (Germany) Felix Kreutzfeldt
- (Germany) Guido Marquardt
- (Germany) Jannik Fellger
- (Germany) Kassandra Kokkala
- (Germany) Katharina Striebich
- (Germany) Kurt Gallo
- (Germany) Manuel Hobiger
- (Germany) Moritz Schäfer
- (Germany) Roland Knauff
- (Germany) Rudi Mewes
- (Germany) Sebastian Jacoby
- (Germany) Sebastian Klussmann
- (Germany) Sebastian Milpetz
- (Germany) Steffen Löwe
- (Germany) Thorsten Zirkel
- (Germany) Tilman Thiry
- (Germany) Vanessa Engelhardt
- (Germany) Vroni Kiefer
- (Hungary) Ákos Kereszturi
- (Hungary) Gábor Fabián
- (Hungary) Gábor Hacsek
- (Hungary) Imre Gerley
- (Hungary) Mihály Bence Bokor
- (Hungary) Péter Lang
- (Republic of Ireland) Dave McBryan
- (Republic of Ireland) Kevin Jones
- (Republic of Ireland) Kevin Lawless
- (Republic of Ireland) Patrick Carthy
- (Liberia) Bendu Diamond Massaquoi
- (Liberia) Grace N. Cole
- (Liberia) Jonathan Z. Saye
- (Liberia) Lahai Kamara
- (Liberia) Oliver M. Suah
- (Liberia) Otis B. Kruah
- (Liberia) Phillip H. Roberts
- (Liberia) Phil Tarpeh Dixon
- (Liberia) Smaila A. Kiazolu Jr
- (Netherlands) Abel Gilsing
- (Netherlands) Aditi Chatterji
- (Netherlands) Diederick Van Elst
- (Netherlands) Devrim Aslan
- (Netherlands) Erwin Fortuin
- (Netherlands) Guido ter Stege
- (Netherlands) Marcel Visschers
- (Netherlands) Michael van Duijkeren
- (Netherlands) Michael-Dennis Biemans
- (Netherlands) Nick Liohenki
- (Netherlands) Paul Uijen
- (Netherlands) Randy van Halen
- (Netherlands) Stefan Engelen
- (Netherlands) Thijs Zijlstra
- (Netherlands) Ujjwal Deb
- (Norway) Aldona Szczepanska
- (Norway) Arild Tørum
- (Norway) Brage Askeli
- (Norway) Brage Nordgård
- (Norway) David A. Tørre
- (Norway) Eivind Moskvil
- (Norway) Espen Iversen
- (Norway) Espen Kibsgård
- (Norway) Fredrik Karlsen Methi
- (Norway) Geir H. Kristiansen
- (Norway) Jørgen Skjånes
- (Norway) Knut Heggland
- (Norway) Kristian Kvamsøe
- (Norway) Lars Heggland
- (Norway) Leif-Atle Heen
- (Norway) Marte Stang Midttun
- (Norway) Mats Sigstad
- (Norway) Ole Martin Halck
- (Norway) Sigbjørn Snørteland
- (Norway) Sonja Sirnes
- (Norway) Thomas Kolåsæter
- (Norway) Toril Opsahl
- (Norway) Tore Heliks Van Dahl
- (Poland) Marzena Szymanowska-Pietrzyk
- (Poland) Tomasz Orzechowski
- (Romania) Bogdan Gigiu-Topan
- (Romania) Constantin Zaharia
- (Romania) Emilian Chifor
- (Romania) Marius Tudor
- (Romania) Mihai-Marian Frunză
- (Romania) Miruna Barti
- (Romania) Nicu Perojuc
- (Romania) Raluca Manole
- (Scotland) Andrew Frazer
- (Scotland) Andy Tucker
- (Scotland) Anne Hegerty
- (Scotland) Barry Simmons
- (Scotland) Galen Chung
- (Scotland) Jack Pollock
- (Scotland) Jamie Gallacher
- (Scotland) Mark Rae
- (Scotland) Neil Macaskill
- (Scotland) Rob Sutherland
- (Scotland) Roderick Cromar
- (Scotland) Stanley Wang
- (Serbia) Boris Stankovic
- (Serbia) Dušan Torbica
- (Serbia) Ivan Andonov
- (Serbia) Lazar Živkov
- (Serbia) Mihajlo Zdravković
- (Serbia) Sara Lukač
- (Serbia) Srećko Veselinović
- (Serbia) Stefan Grnčarski
- (Sweden) Duncan McDonald
- (Switzerland) Helene Portmann
- (Switzerland) Prakhar Gupta
- (Switzerland) Rajan Thambehalli
- (Switzerland) Renate Schaer
- (United States) Alan Lin
- (United States) Andrew Ullsperger
- (United States) Anu Kashyap
- (United States) Brandon Blackwell
- (United States) Carlo Aiello
- (United States) Chris Goheen
- (United States) Clifford Galiher
- (United States) Hans von Walter
- (United States) Henry Herron
- (United States) Jayanthi Srinivasan
- (United States) Jean Cui
- (United States) Jeff Richmond
- (United States) Jeffrey Seguritan
- (United States) Jerome Vered
- (United States) Kathryn Verwillow
- (United States) Leonard Fahrni
- (United States) Mark Ryder
- (United States) Matt Jackson
- (United States) Nilla Sivakumar
- (United States) Raj Dhuwalia
- (United States) Shane Whitlock
- (United States) Victoria Groce
- (United States) Warren Usui
- (Wales) Andrew Teale
- (Wales) Ben Jones
- (Wales) David Cowan
- (Wales) Gareth Kingston
- (Wales) Ian Welham
- (Wales) Liam Hughes
- (Wales) Mark Grant

== Medalists ==
The results were:

Event	Gold	Silver	Bronze
Individual Quiz	(England) Daoud Jackson	(Belgium) Ronny Swiggers	(Norway) Thomas Kolåsæter
Nations Team Quiz	USA; Andrew Ullsperger; Brandon Blackwell; Victoria Groce; Shane Whitlock	Belgium; Nico Pattyn; Tom Trogh; Ronny Swiggers; Lander Frederickx	England; Daoud Jackson; Evan Lynch; Ian Bayley; Pat Gibson
Pairs Quiz	(Croatia) Dean Kotiga (England) Daoud Jackson	(Norway) Thomas Kolåsæter (United States) Victoria Groce	(England) Pat Gibson (England) Ian Bayley
<30 Individual Quiz	(England) Daoud Jackson	(England) Evan Lynch	(Wales) Liam Hughes
<30 Pairs Quiz	(Wales) Ben Jones (Belgium) Thomas De Bock	(Belgium) Yarnick Piscador (Belgium) Sven Lefèvre	(Norway) Fredrik Karlsen Methi (Norway) Sigbjørn Snørteland
>70 Individual Quiz	(Australia) Ross Evans	(United States) Mark Ryder	(England) Pam Douglas
U30 Nations Team Quiz	Belgium; Yarnick Piscador; Thomas De Bock; Sven Lefèvre; Warre Van den Eynde	Croatia; Ivan Juric; Krešimir Melnik; Slaven Maros	Germany; Jannik Fellger; Felix Kreutzfeldt; Moritz Schäfer; Christoph Wötzel
Sciences Quiz	(England) Evan Lynch	(United States) Andrew Ullsperger	(Belgium) Lander Frederickx
Film Quiz	(United States) Clifford Galiher	(Croatia) Dean Kotiga	(Germany) Sebastian Milpetz
History Quiz	(Belgium) Nico Pattyn	(United States) Matt Jackson (England) Ian Bayley	not awarded (tie for silver)
Digital World Quiz	(Belgium) Tom Trogh	(United States) Brandon Blackwell	(Australia) Marc Cheong
Literature Quiz	(Belgium) Tim van der Heyden	(Belgium) Lander Frederickx	(England) Evan Lynch (United States) Victoria Groce
Food & Drink Quiz	(England) Daoud Jackson	(United States) Kathryn Verwillow (United States) Andrew Ullsperger (United States) Jeff Richmond	not awarded (tie for silver)
Visual Arts Quiz	(United States) Victoria Groce (Scotland) Jack Pollock	not awarded (tie for gold)	(Belgium) Tim van der Heyden (Belgium) Ronny Swiggers (United States) Alan Lin
Sport Quiz	(Belgium) Dries van de Sande	(Belgium) Tom Trogh (Estonia) Igor Habal	not awarded (tie for silver)
Geography Quiz	(Belgium) Paul Arts	(Belgium) Nico Pattyn	(Germany) Manuel Hobiger
Television Quiz	(United States) Victoria Groce	(Belgium) Tom Trogh (Croatia) Neven Trgovec	not awarded (tie for silver)
Nature Quiz	(Belgium) Lander Frederickx	(England) Pat Gibson	(England) Daoud Jackson
Pop Music Quiz	(Netherlands) Guido ter Stege (Belgium) Lars van Moer	not awarded (tie for gold)	(Belgium) Tom Trogh
Pentathlon Specialist Quiz	(Belgium) Tom Trogh	(Belgium) Lander Frederickx	(Belgium) Ronny Swiggers
National Specialist Quiz	Belgium; Lander Frederickx; Tom Trogh; Nico Pattyn; Tim van der Heyden; Ronny Swiggers; Dries van de Sande; Paul Arts; Lars van Moer	USA; Andrew Ullsperger; Clifford Galiher; Matt Jackson; Brandon Blackwell; Victoria Groce; Kathryn Verwillow; Shane Whitlock; Anu Kashyap	England; Evan Lynch; Amit De; Ian Bayley; Daoud Jackson; Pat Gibson; Ian Clark; Oliver Levy
High Brow Specialist Quiz	(Belgium) Lander Frederickx	(United States) Matt Jackson	(Belgium) Ronny Swiggers
Populist Special Quiz	(Belgium) Tom Trogh	(England) Daoud Jackson	(United States) Brandon Blackwell
World Club Team Quiz	The New Janitors (Norway) Thomas Kolåsæter (United States) Victoria Groce (United States) Andrew Ullsperger (Belgium) Derk de Graaf	The Rolling Scones (Croatia) Dean Kotiga (United States) Shane Whitlock (Croatia) Neven Trgovec (England) Daoud Jackson	Broken Hearts (England) Pat Gibson (England) Ian Bayley (Scotland) Jack Pollock (England) Hugh Bennett
Knockout Quiz	(England) Evan Lynch	(Serbia) Ivan Andonov	(Estonia) Kaarel Silmato

Event	Gold	Silver	Bronze
Aspirational Cup	(United States) USA B Matt Jackson; Raj Dhuwalia; Anu Kashyap; Jeffrey Seguritan	(Belgium) The League of Very Mediocre Wingmen; Dries Van De Sande; Gert-Jan Dugardein; Luc Lenaerts; Tim Van der Heyden	England B Amit De; Matt Todd; Hugh Bennett; Andrew Whittingham
Frankenquiz	???	???	???

== Medal table ==
The final medal table was:

Rank	Nation	Gold	Silver	Bronze	Total
1	Belgium (BEL)	12	7	6	25
2	England	5	4	5	14
3	United States (USA)	4	9	3	16
4	Australia (AUS)	1	0	1	2
5	Netherlands (NED)	1	0	0	1
5	Scotland	1	0	0	1
7	Croatia (CRO)	0	3	0	3
8	Estonia (EST)	0	1	1	2
9	Serbia (SER)	0	1	0	1
10	Germany (GER)	0	0	3	3
11	Norway (NOR)	0	0	1	1
11	Wales	0	0	1	1
Totals (12 entries)		24	25	21	70
