= 2016 Quiz Olympiad =

Quizzing championship held in Athens

- Host city: Athens
- Country: Greece
- Nations: 26
- Debuting countries: 26
- Athletes: 201
- Events: 44
- Opening: 3 November 2016
- Closing: 6 November 2016
- Website: quizolympiad.com

Organised by the International Quizzing Association and held from 3 to 6 November 2016, the 2016 Quiz Olympiad in Athens was the inaugural Quiz Olympiad. Replacing the annual European Quizzing Championships, the event was open to quizzers from all over the world, with representatives of 26 nations competing.

== Event ==
The event hosted quizzes that combined awarded 132 medals.

=== Quizzes ===
The following were the official quizzes at the 2016 Quiz Olympiad:

- Individual Quiz
- Nations Team Quiz
- Pairs Quiz
- History Quiz
- Sport Quiz
- Literature Quiz
- Business Quiz
- Sciences Quiz
- Digital Quiz
- Visual Arts Quiz
- Television Quiz
- Geography Quiz
- Film Quiz
- Performing Arts Quiz
- Pop Music Quiz
- Pentathlon Specialist Quiz
- National Specialist Quiz
- High Brow Specialist Quiz
- Populist Special Quiz
- Speed Quiz
- Knockout Quiz

Some quizzes have similar standing with IOC demonstration sports. These were awarded medals, but do not feature on the overall medals table:

- Aspirational Team Quiz
- World Club Team Quiz

== Participants ==
There were 201 participants from 26 nations at the 2016 Quiz Olympiad. Some notable participants included Nico Pattyn and Ronny Swiggers of Belgium; Dorjana Širola of Croatia; Kevin Ashman, Olav Bjortomt, Pat Gibson, Ian Bayley, David Stainer, Paul Sinha, and Jenny Ryan of England; Tero Kalliolevo of Finland; Holger Waldenberger of Germany; Anne Hegerty and Barry Simmons of Scotland; Ed Toutant, Ken Jennings, and Shane Whitlock of the United States; and David Edwards of Wales.

Participating nations
- Australia (8)
- Austria (4)
- Belgium (12)
- Brazil (1)
- Bulgaria (2)
- Canada (1)
- Croatia (8)
- Denmark (10)
- England (18)
- Estonia (7)
- Finland (4)
- France (7)
- Germany (10)
- Hungary (4)
- India (3)
- Ireland (5)
- Netherlands (6)
- New Zealand (1)
- Norway (36)
- Portugal (8)
- Romania (6)
- Russia (3)
- Scotland (9)
- Serbia (2)
- United States (16)
- Wales (8)

Full list of participants
- (Australia) Christian Kelly
- (Australia) David Regal
- (Australia) Gordon McGregor
- (Australia) Michael Logue
- (Australia) Paul Bakker
- (Australia) Rick Bakker
- (Australia) Ross Evans
- (Australia) Yolanda Stopar
- (Austria) Astrid Rief
- (Austria) Johannes Eibl
- (Austria) Michael Domanig
- (Austria) Stefan Pletzer
- (Belgium) Chris Braxel
- (Belgium) Derk De Graaf
- (Belgium) Dardo Lippens
- (Belgium) Gerben Smit
- (Belgium) Ivo Geyskens
- (Belgium) Jens Everaerdt
- (Belgium) Kris Van der Coelden
- (Belgium) Luc Venstermans
- (Belgium) Nico Pattyn
- (Belgium) Paul Arts
- (Belgium) Ronny Swiggers
- (Belgium) Stijn Gyselinckx
- (Brazil) Peter Lochmann
- (Bulgaria) Dimitar Georgiev
- (Bulgaria) Plamen Mladenov
- (Canada) Sandy Vos
- (Croatia) Dean Kotiga
- (Croatia) Dorjana Širola
- (Croatia) Ivan Vlahek
- (Croatia) Krešimir Štimac
- (Croatia) Kresimir Sucevic Mederal
- (Croatia) Mario Kovač
- (Croatia) Mladen Vukorepa
- (Croatia) Perica Zivanovic
- (Denmark) Anders Pedersen
- (Denmark) Esben Christiansen
- (Denmark) Flemming Borg Nielsen
- (Denmark) Glen Odgaard
- (Denmark) Hans Ewald Skov Hansen
- (Denmark) Mads Theodorsen
- (Denmark) Maj-Britt Christensen
- (Denmark) Mukke Pedersen
- (Denmark) Rasmus Soelberg
- (Denmark) Søren Brøndum Laursen
- (England) David Knapp
- (England) David Stainer
- (England) Duncan McDonald
- (England) Gerard Mackay
- (England) Glenys Hopkins
- (England) Hugh Bennett
- (England) Ian Bayley
- (England) Ian Clark
- (England) Jack Bennett
- (England) Jenny Ryan
- (England) Kathryn Johnson
- (England) Kevin Ashman
- (England) Ned Pendleton
- (England) Nick Mills
- (England) Olav Bjortomt
- (England) Pat Gibson
- (England) Paul Sinha
- (England) Tim Westcott
- (Estonia) Igor Habal
- (Estonia) Illar Tõnisson
- (Estonia) Indrek Salis
- (Estonia) Kaarel Silmato
- (Estonia) Mati Räli
- (Estonia) Ove Põder
- (Estonia) Tauno Vahter
- (Finland) Lars Matti Årvold
- (Finland) Leslie Shannon
- (Finland) Tero Kalliolevo
- (Finland) Tuomas Tumi
- (France) Benjamin Gruget
- (France) Céline Marlot
- (France) Didier Bruyere
- (France) Eric Ziegler
- (France) Frédéric Faucheux
- (France) Jérôme Vachet
- (France) Vincent Rousset
- (Germany) Andy Östreich
- (Germany) Christoph Paninka
- (Germany) Dirk Vielhuber
- (Germany) Holger Waldenberger
- (Germany) Manuel Hobiger
- (Germany) Marie-Louise Finck
- (Germany) Pascal Bothe
- (Germany) Sebastian Klussmann
- (Germany) Thorsten Zirkel
- (Germany) Vanessa Engelhardt
- (Hungary) Balazs Greff
- (Hungary) Gabor Hacsek
- (Hungary) Imre Gerley
- (Hungary) Mihaly Bokor
- (India) Dr Anurag Danda
- (India) Arjun Pisharody
- (India) Kshitij Jyoti
- (Republic of Ireland) Dave McBryan
- (Republic of Ireland) Kevin Jones
- (Republic of Ireland) Lorcan Duff
- (Republic of Ireland) Mark Henry
- (Republic of Ireland) Paddy Duffy
- (Netherlands) Abel Gilsing
- (Netherlands) Aditi Chatterji
- (Netherlands) Diederick van Elst
- (Netherlands) Marcel Visschers
- (Netherlands) Michael-Dennis Biemans
- (Netherlands) Ujjwal Deb
- (New Zealand) Kelvin Lange
- (Norway) Aldona Szczepanska
- (Norway) Andreas Benjamin Schei
- (Norway) Anne Moseng Knutsen
- (Norway) Arne Blakkisrud
- (Norway) Brage Nordgård
- (Norway) Camilla F. Wedul
- (Norway) Dag Olav Rønning
- (Norway) David Tørre Asprusten
- (Norway) Eivind Moskvil
- (Norway) Eskil Åsmul
- (Norway) Geir H. Kristiansen
- (Norway) Harald Aastorp
- (Norway) Ingri Haakonsen
- (Norway) Ivar Areklett
- (Norway) Jarle Kvåle
- (Norway) Jon Inge Kolden
- (Norway) Jørgen Skjånes
- (Norway) Jørn Gulbrandsen
- (Norway) Knut Heggland
- (Norway) Lars André Gundersen
- (Norway) Lars Heggland
- (Norway) Leif-Atle Heen
- (Norway) Marte Stang Midttun
- (Norway) Mats Sigstad
- (Norway) Ole Martin Halck
- (Norway) Øystein Aadnevik
- (Norway) Per Harald Ninive
- (Norway) Reidar Eldegard
- (Norway) Silje Nisja
- (Norway) Sonja Sirnes
- (Norway) Svein Erik Gransjøen
- (Norway) Thomas Kolåsæter
- (Norway) Tore Heliks Van Dahl
- (Norway) Toril Opsahl
- (Norway) Trond Stabell
- (Norway) Vibeke Stang Lingås
- (Portugal) Alexandre Gonçalves
- (Portugal) André Ascensão
- (Portugal) Jorge Páramos
- (Portugal) José André
- (Portugal) José Mário Silva
- (Portugal) Paulo Martins
- (Portugal) Rodrigo Castro
- (Portugal) Sofia Santos
- (Romania) Alexe Dorin Popa
- (Romania) Cristian Pop
- (Romania) Eduard Stan
- (Romania) Iulian Nastasa
- (Romania) Mircea Zaharia
- (Romania) Nick Perojuc
- (Russia) Denis Peskov
- (Russia) Ivan Kebets
- (Russia) Sergey Nikolaev
- (Scotland) Andy Tucker
- (Scotland) Anne Hegerty
- (Scotland) Barry Simmons
- (Scotland) Galen Chung
- (Scotland) Mark Rae
- (Scotland) Neil Macaskill
- (Scotland) Rob Hannah
- (Scotland) Rob Sutherland
- (Scotland) Roderick Cromar
- (Serbia) Ivan Andonov
- (Serbia) Todor Milak
- (United States) Brandon Blackwell
- (United States) Chris Goheen
- (United States) Dave Legler
- (United States) Ed Toutant
- (United States) Jean Cui
- (United States) Julie Ghanbari
- (United States) Kathryn Verwillow
- (United States) Ken Jennings
- (United States) Lee-Ann Whitlock
- (United States) Les Chun
- (United States) Mark Ryder
- (United States) Paul Bailey
- (United States) Raj Dhuwalia
- (United States) Shane Whitlock
- (United States) Tanay Kothari
- (United States) Tim Polley
- (Wales) Andrew Teale
- (Wales) David Edwards
- (Wales) Gareth Aubrey
- (Wales) Gareth Kingston
- (Wales) Ian Orriss
- (Wales) Ian Welham
- (Wales) Mark Grant
- (Wales) Sean O’Neill

== Medalists ==
The results were:

Event	Gold	Silver	Bronze
Individual Quiz	(England) Olav Bjortomt	(England) Kevin Ashman	(England) Pat Gibson
Nations Team Quiz	England; Kevin Ashman; Ian Bayley; Olav Bjortomt; Pat Gibson	Belgium; Gerben Smit; Stijn Gyselinckx; Nico Pattyn; Ronny Swiggers	Norway; Tore Heliks Van Dahl; Ole Martin Halck; Thomas Kolåsæter; Geir Kristiansen
Pairs Quiz	(England) Kevin Ashman (England) Pat Gibson	(England) David Stainer (England) Olav Bjortomt	(Belgium) Nico Pattyn (United States) Ed Toutant
History Quiz	(England) Kevin Ashman	(Belgium) Nico Pattyn	(Estonia) Ove Põder
Sport Quiz	(Estonia) Igor Habal	(Croatia) Perica Živanović	(Estonia) Illar Tõnisson
Literature Quiz	(England) Olav Bjortomt	(England) Kevin Ashman	(Estonia) Igor Habal
Business Quiz	(Netherlands) Ujjwal Deb	(Finland) Leslie Shannon	(Netherlands) Abel Gilsing
Sciences Quiz	(England) Pat Gibson	(England) Ian Bayley	(England) Kevin Ashman
Digital Quiz	(Netherlands) Michael-Dennis Biemans	(Norway) Knut Heggland	(United States) Brandon Blackwell
Visual Arts Quiz	(England) Kevin Ashman	(Belgium) Ronny Swiggers	(England) Olav Bjortomt
Television Quiz	(Republic of Ireland) Lorcan Duff	(Norway) Brage Nordgård	(England) Jenny Ryan
Geography Quiz	(Belgium) Paul Arts	(Belgium) Nico Pattyn	(England) Kevin Ashman
Film Quiz	(England) Olav Bjortomt	(United States) Ken Jennings	(Wales) Mark Grant
Performing Arts Quiz	(England) Kevin Ashman	(England) Pat Gibson	(England) Kathryn Johnson
Pop Music Quiz	(Republic of Ireland) Lorcan Duff	(England) David Stainer	(Belgium) Ronny Swiggers
Pentathlon Specialist Quiz	(England) Kevin Ashman	(England) Olav Bjortomt	(Belgium) Ronny Swiggers
National Specialist Quiz	England; Kevin Ashman; Paul Sinha; Olav Bjortomt; Tim Westcott; Pat Gibson; Jenny Ryan; David Stainer	Norway; Lars Heggland; Jon Inge Kolden; Thomas Kolåsæter; Brage Nordgård; Ole Martin Halck; Knut Heggland; Eivind Moskvill; Leif-Atle Heen	Belgium; Nico Pattyn; Stijn Gyselinckx; Ronny Swiggers; Gerben Smit; Paul Arts; Luc Venstermans; Ivo Geyskens
High Brow Specialist Quiz	(England) Kevin Ashman	(England) Pat Gibson	(Belgium) Nico Pattyn
Populist Special Quiz	(Republic of Ireland) Lorcan Duff	(Netherlands) Michael-Dennis Biemans	(Romania) Mircea Zaharia
Speed Quiz	(United States) Brandon Blackwell	(England) David Stainer	(United States) Tanay Kothari
Knockout Quiz	(Norway) Tore Heliks Van Dahl	(Estonia) Igor Habal	(United States) Shane Whitlock

== Medal table ==
The total medal table was:

Rank	Nation	Gold	Silver	Bronze	Total
1	England	12	9	6	27
2	Ireland (IRL)	3	0	0	3
3	Netherlands (NED)	2	1	1	4
4	Belgium (BEL)	1	4	4.5	9.5
5	Norway (NOR)	1	3	1	5
6	United States (USA)	1	1	3.5	5.5
7	Estonia (EST)	1	1	3	5
8	Croatia (CRO)	0	1	0	1
8	Finland (FIN)	0	1	0	1
10	Romania (ROU)	0	0	1	1
10	Wales	0	0	1	1
Totals (11 entries)		21	21	21	63
