= Olav Bjortomt =

English professional quizzer

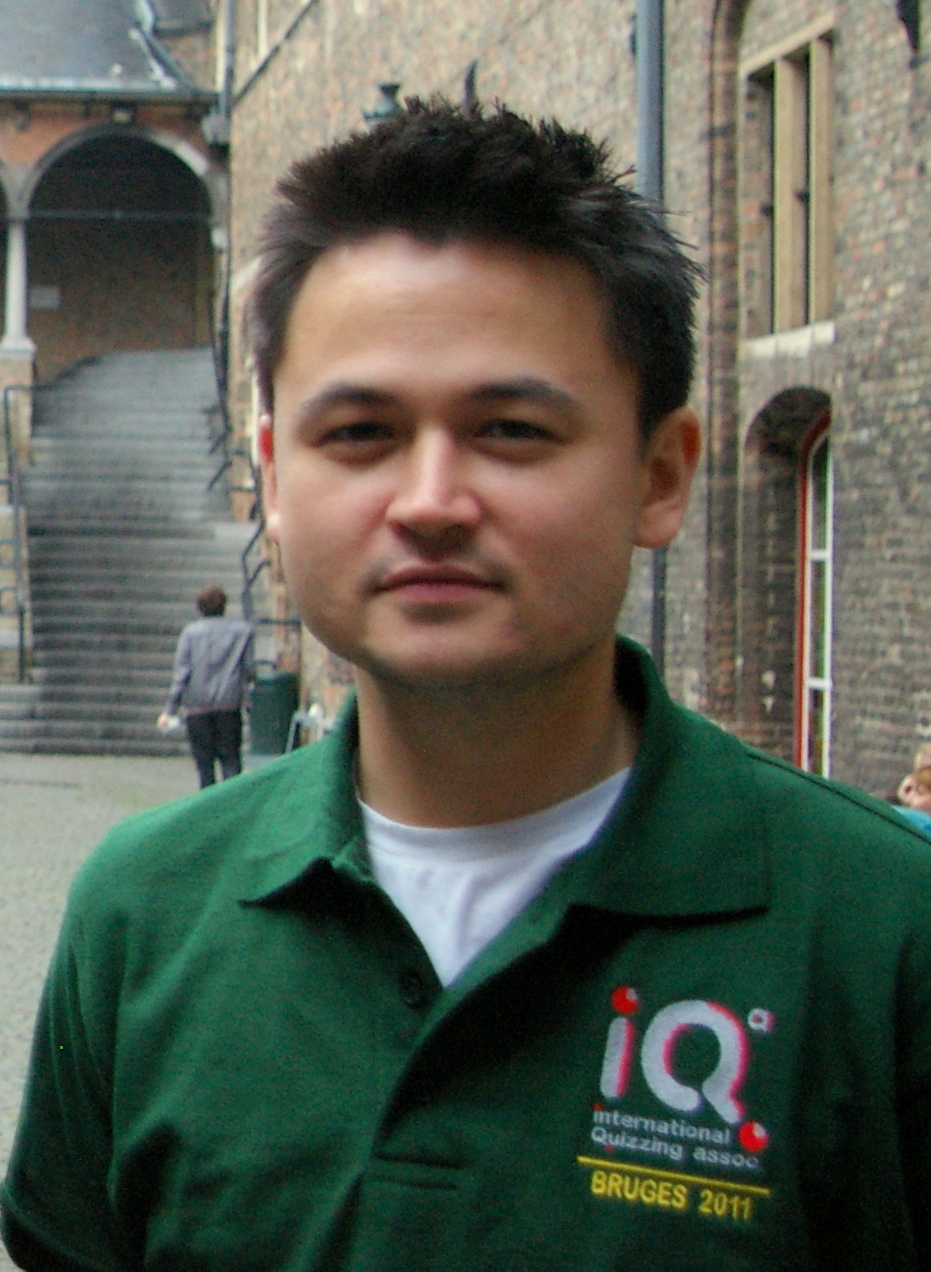
- Bjortomt at the 2011 European Quizzing Championships in Bruges

Medal record

Quizzing

Representing England

Quiz Olympiad
| Gold medal – first place | 2016 Athens | Individual Quiz |
| Gold medal – first place | 2016 Athens | Nations Team Quiz |
| Gold medal – first place | 2016 Athens | Literature Quiz |
| Gold medal – first place | 2016 Athens | Film Quiz |
| Gold medal – first place | 2016 Athens | National Specialist Quiz |
| Silver medal – second place | 2016 Athens | Pairs |
| Silver medal – second place | 2016 Athens | Pentathlon Specialist Quiz |
| Bronze medal – third place | 2016 Athens | Visual Arts Quiz |

IQA World Championships
| Gold medal – first place | 2003 | Singles |
| Gold medal – first place | 2015 | Singles |
| Gold medal – first place | 2018 | Singles |
| Gold medal – first place | 2019 | Singles |

IQA European Championships
| Silver medal – second place | 2006 Paris | National Team |
| Bronze medal – third place | 2006 Paris | Club |
| Gold medal – first place | 2007 Blackpool | Club |
| Bronze medal – third place | 2008 Oslo | Singles |
| Silver medal – second place | 2008 Oslo | Pairs |
| Silver medal – second place | 2008 Oslo | National Team |
| Gold medal – first place | 2008 Oslo | Club |
| Silver medal – second place | 2009 Dordrecht | Singles |
| Gold medal – first place | 2009 Dordrecht | Pairs |
| Gold medal – first place | 2009 Dordrecht | National Team |
| Gold medal – first place | 2009 Dordrecht | Club |
| Gold medal – first place | 2010 Derby | Singles |
| Bronze medal – third place | 2010 Derby | Pairs |
| Gold medal – first place | 2010 Derby | National Team |
| Silver medal – second place | 2010 Derby | Club |
| Bronze medal – third place | 2011 Bruges | Singles |
| Bronze medal – third place | 2011 Bruges | Pairs |
| Gold medal – first place | 2011 Bruges | Club |
| Bronze medal – third place | 2012 Tartu | Singles |
| Gold medal – first place | 2012 Tartu | National Team |
| Gold medal – first place | 2013 Liverpool | National Team |
| Silver medal – second place | 2013 Liverpool | Pairs |
| Gold medal – first place | 2014 Bucharest | Singles |
| Bronze medal – third place | 2014 Bucharest | Pairs |
| Gold medal – first place | 2014 Bucharest | National Team |
| Gold medal – first place | 2014 Bucharest | Club |
| Gold medal – first place | 2015 Rotterdam | Singles |
| Silver medal – second place | 2015 Rotterdam | Pairs |
| Gold medal – first place | 2015 Rotterdam | National Team |
| Gold medal – first place | 2015 Rotterdam | Club |
| Gold medal – first place | 2016 Athens | Singles |
| Silver medal – second place | 2016 Athens | Pairs |
| Gold medal – first place | 2016 Athens | National Team |
| Silver medal – second place | 2016 Athens | Club |
| Silver medal – second place | 2017 Zagreb | Singles |
| Silver medal – second place | 2017 Zagreb | Pairs |
| Gold medal – first place | 2017 Zagreb | National Team |
| Bronze medal – third place | 2018 Venice | National Team |
| Bronze medal – third place | 2019 Sofia | Pairs |
| Gold medal – first place | 2019 Sofia | National Team |
| Silver medal – second place | 2019 Sofia | Club |

IQA British Championships
| Silver medal – second place | 2007 Derby | Singles |
| Gold medal – first place | 2007 Derby | Pairs |
| Bronze medal – third place | 2008 Staveley | Pairs |
| Gold medal – first place | 2012 Lichfield | Pairs |

Stein Olav Bjortomt (pronounced Bortom) (born 13 December 1978 in Eastbourne) is a British international quiz player, four-time world champion (2003, 2015, 2018, 2019) and three-time individual European champion (2010, 2014, 2015). He is a player in one of the world's most successful quizzing teams, Broken Hearts, with which he has won several European championships.

He is of Norwegian and Filipino descent and writes questions for University Challenge and The Chase.

In contrast to the other two full-time professionals of Team England Pat Gibson and Kevin Ashman he has not done as well both in domestic competitions, with only a second place in the individual British championships 2007 to his credit (though he has won the pairs competition) and as a TV candidate, a second place in the Fifteen to One series of 2002 being his best result.

== National and international titles ==
He was the winner of the inaugural 2003 individual World Quizzing Championships, when it was a fledgling event with then only 45 participants (now in the thousands) but won a second title in 2015. In 2009 he won three out of four possible European titles and was runner-up behind Kevin Ashman in the singles to become the most successful participant.

Time Out described him in 2006 as a "former child quiz prodigy and a rising star of the quiz world".

After his triumph at the very first World Quizzing Championship 2003 he did not win a medal at the world stage for twelve years, but always was Top 10. His absence at Ghent in 2004 (when England won the first European Championship) meant he was not selected for the national team until 2006. He should have played in 2007 but travel problems delayed his arrival at the event. Consequently, he has only latterly become a regular in the star-studded English national team (Ashman, Mark Bytheway and Pat Gibson).

He is also part of the Broken Hearts (with Ian Bayley, formerly David Stainer, replaced by Didier Bruyere and Mark Grant) quiz team which play in the QLL and have been European Club champions from 2007 to 2009. Bjortomt won the Pairs Championships with partner Stainer in 2009 and has won 21 international medals on aggregate (see medal table). He also holds the title "British Quizzing Grandmaster".

== TV appearances ==
Bjortomt's success on TV has been rather moderate compared with that of his teammates in the national team, and he describes himself as a "choker" (see Q&A link). He appeared on the quiz show Fifteen to One four times, finishing as a series runner-up in 2002.

He captained the University of Nottingham team to the quarter-finals in the 1999–2000 series of BBC's University Challenge, and according to the credits of the show as of 2024, is currently a question setter. When he appeared on the Channel 4 quiz show Grand Slam in 2003, commentator James Richardson described him as the "Wayne Rooney of the quiz world."

In 2007, Bjortomt competed in The National Lottery People's Quiz and was the first contestant to qualify for the grand final, answering 97 per cent of his questions correctly during the show.

In 2008, he appeared in the quiz programme Battle of the Brains.

On 10 October 2008, he appeared on Mastermind, scoring eight points on questions about West Indies Test cricket, and fourteen in the General Knowledge section, to finish in second place.

In 2008 and 2009, he unsuccessfully competed in Are You an Egghead?, which attempts to find another player to join the existing team.

In 2021, he became part of the Channel 5 quiz show Eggheads.

== Book ==
- National Quiz Team: The Only Quiz Book You Will Ever Need (co author) ISBN 978-1780893693

== Personal details ==
In 2001 Bjortomt was the winner of The Guardian's Student Feature writer of the Year award. He has a History degree from the University of Nottingham and a Postgraduate Diploma in Newspaper Journalism from Nottingham Trent University. He worked for The Times newspaper in London and has set the weekday Times2 quiz since July 2005 to the present day along with The Times Saturday quiz.

His parents are Norwegian and Filipino. He has two younger sisters and a younger brother.
