= Music for the Mission =

Annual quiz night in Hobart, Tasmania, Australia (2003–2010)

Music for the Mission (titled Music for the Masses until 2008) was a quiz night held annually in Hobart, Tasmania, Australia between 2003 and 2010. In 2007, it attracted 1,324 participants, making it at that time the largest single-venue quiz or trivia night ever held, according to Guinness World Records.

== Organisation ==
All funds raised at Music for the Mission were donated to the Hobart City Mission for use in their charitable programmes in Tasmania. The event was organised by The Quizzer of Oz, and MCed by former Sale of the Century champion, David Walch.
