= Erik Derycke =

Erik Derycke may refer to:

- Erik Derycke (politician) (born 1949), Belgian judge and politician
- Erik Derycke (quiz player) (born 1970), Belgian quiz player
