= Erik Derycke (quiz player) =

Belgian quiz player

Medal record

Quizzing

Representing Belgium

IQA European Championships
Gold medal – first place	2005 Paris	National Team
Gold medal – first place	2006 Paris	National Team
Silver medal – second place	2007 Blackpool	National Team
Silver medal – second place	2007 Blackpool	Club
Gold medal – first place	2007 Blackpool	Pairs
Gold medal – first place	2008 Oslo	National Team
Silver medal – second place	2009 Dordrecht	National Team
Silver medal – second place	2010 Derby	National Team
Bronze medal – third place	2010 Derby	Club
Silver medal – second place	2011 Bruges	Pairs
Bronze medal – third place	2011 Bruges	National Team
Silver medal – second place	2013 Liverpool	National Team
Bronze medal – third place	2013 Liverpool	Club
Silver medal – second place	2015 Rotterdam	National Team
Silver medal – second place	2015 Rotterdam	Club

Erik Derycke (born 1970) is a Belgian quiz player best known for his success with the national team and his double gold at the European Quizzing Championships (EQC) 2007 with his partner Tom Trogh.

== Quiz ==
He has been a national team member since 2003 when his team won the "England-Belgium interland", the precursor of the EQC. Derycke has won three European titles in 2005, 2006 and 2008, Silver in five other competitions and Bronze in 2011 with the national site.

He also won the EQC double title with national teammate Tom Trogh (also from Leuven) in 2007, and Silver in 2011. The other two national players are Ronny Swiggers and Nico Pattyn.

With his club "Clockwork" (line-up Tom Trogh, Marnix Baes, Bart Permentier) he won European Silver in 2007 and Bronze in 2010 and 2013.

His strongest subject is Culture. In individual competition he reached the 9th place three times at the World Quizzing Championships, in 2005, 2006 and 2010.

== Outside quizzing ==
He studied Germanic Literature, and now works as the chief editor of Belgian photography magazine "Shoot" which severely limits his time to quiz.
