= Tom Trogh =

Belgian quiz player

Medal record

Quizzing

Representing Belgium

IQA European Championships
Gold medal – first place	2006 Paris	National Team
Silver medal – second place	2007 Blackpool	National Team
Silver medal – second place	2007 Blackpool	Club
Gold medal – first place	2007 Blackpool	Pairs
Gold medal – first place	2008 Oslo	National Team
Silver medal – second place	2009 Dordrecht	National Team
Silver medal – second place	2010 Derby	National Team
Bronze medal – third place	2010 Derby	Club
Silver medal – second place	2011 Bruges	Pairs
Bronze medal – third place	2011 Bruges	National Team
Bronze medal – third place	2012 Tartu	National Team
Silver medal – second place	2013 Liverpool	National Team
Bronze medal – third place	2013 Liverpool	Club
Silver medal – second place	2015 Rotterdam	National Team
Silver medal – second place	2015 Rotterdam	Club
Silver medal – second place	2017 Zagreb	National Team
Silver medal – second place	2018 Venice	Individual
Bronze medal – third place	2018 Venice	Pairs
Silver medal – second place	2018 Venice	National Team
Silver medal – second place	2019 Sofia	National Team
Bronze medal – third place	2021 Kraków	Pairs
Gold medal – first place	2021 Kraków	National Team
Gold medal – first place	2022 Berlin	National Team
Silver medal – second place	2023 Torremolinos	National Team
Silver medal – second place	2023 Torremolinos	Pairs
Silver medal – second place	2024 Fuengirola	National Team

Tom Trogh (b. 17 June 1984) is a Belgian quiz player who has won several international titles with the national team of quizzing powerhouse Belgium. He has established himself as the third best player of his country behind Ronny Swiggers and Nico Pattyn. Like all Belgian stars he is an amateur, he works as an actuary in a life insurance company.

He has been a member of the National Team since 2006 and has won two European team titles (EQC) in 2006 and 2008, four silver medals in 2007, 2009, 2010 and 2013, and twice Bronze in 2011 and 2012. With his club "Clockwork" from Leuven (other members are Erik Derycke (the fourth national player), Marnix Baes, Bart Permentier) he reached European Silver in 2007 and Bronze in 2010 and 2013.

He also won the European double competition with Derycke in 2007, and was second in 2011.

On an individual level he has made a big jump from 2008 to 2009 from rank #39 to 10+-. He placed 11th at the World Quizzing Championship (WQC) both in 2009 and 2010 and 10th (2009) and 8th (2010) respectively at the EQC (all results at iqa.be), making him the only contender under the age of 30.

His strongest subject is Sports.
