= International Quizzing Championships =

Annual multi-disciplinary quiz event

European and International Quizzing Championships hosting cities

The International Quizzing Championships (IQC) is an annual multi-disciplinary quiz event, in which representatives from various countries compete as individuals, in pairs, and in teams (club and national).

It was known as the European Quizzing Championships (EQC) from 2004 to 2021 and was open to European quizzers only. To reflect the competition's shift to a more global reach, the 2022 edition was played as the Ultimate Quizzing Championships (UQC). In 2023 it was rebranded to its current name.

== History ==
In contrast to the World Quizzing Championship, the IQC is played in one place only, in English only (WQC is played in the language of each country) and has several competitions with more than one player (pairs, national teams - for four players, and clubs - also four players). In 2016 the EQC was part of the 2016 Quiz Olympiad. In 2021 it was part of the 2021 Quiz Olympiad and in 2024 it was part of the 2024 Quiz Olympiad.

The 2010 event attracted media attention from BBC Radio Derby and was the subject also of a BBC Radio 4 documentary presented by the comedian, and quiz enthusiast, Paul Sinha. The 2006 event in Lésigny near Paris was also the subject of a well received Channel 4 documentary 'Quizzers' by the director Paul Whittaker, shown in the UK as part of the series 'New Shoots'. The 2022 edition was the subject of an episode of the Arte documentary series Arte Regards which aired in January 2023.

In 2020 the event was planned to take place in Kraków from 5 November until 8 November, but was postponed a year due to the COVID-19 pandemic.

== Individual champions ==
England's Kevin Ashman and Olav Bjortomt are the most successful candidates with six and four individual titles, respectively. Belgian Nico Pattyn upset all the locals in 2007 in Blackpool, to become the first Belgian to win the trophy. In 2012, Germany's Holger Waldenberger won with the last question on musician Dr. John, while trailing by one point from Igor Habal. Ronny Swiggers took another Belgian victory in 2013.

| Year | Venue | Winner | Runner up | Third place |
|---|---|---|---|---|
| 2004 | (Belgium) Ghent | (England) Kevin Ashman | (Belgium) Nico Pattyn | (England) Pat Gibson |
| 2005 | (Estonia) Tallinn | (England) Kevin Ashman | (Estonia) Indrek Salis | (England) Pat Gibson |
| 2006 | (France) Lésigny | (England) Kevin Ashman | (England) Mark Bytheway | (Belgium) Lieven Van den Brande |
| 2007 | (England) Blackpool | (Belgium) Nico Pattyn | (Belgium) Lieven Van den Brande | (England) Pat Gibson |
| 2008 | (Norway) Oslo | (England) Kevin Ashman | (England) Pat Gibson | (England) Olav Bjortomt |
| 2009 | (Netherlands) Dordrecht | (England) Kevin Ashman | (England) Olav Bjortomt | (England) Pat Gibson |
| 2010 | (England) Derby | (England) Olav Bjortomt | (Finland) Tero Kalliolevo | (England) Pat Gibson |
| 2011 | (Belgium) Bruges | (England) Kevin Ashman | (England) Pat Gibson | (England) Olav Bjortomt |
| 2012 | (Estonia) Tartu | (Germany) Holger Waldenberger | (Estonia) Igor Habal | (England) Olav Bjortomt |
| 2013 | (England) Liverpool | (Belgium) Ronny Swiggers | (Belgium) Nico Pattyn | (England) Jesse Honey |
| 2014 | (Romania) Bucharest | (England) Olav Bjortomt | (England) Kevin Ashman | (Finland) Tero Kalliolevo |
| 2015 | (Netherlands) Rotterdam | (England) Olav Bjortomt | (Belgium) Ronny Swiggers | (England) Pat Gibson |
| 2016 | (Greece) Athens | (England) Olav Bjortomt | (England) Kevin Ashman | (England) Pat Gibson |
| 2017 | (Croatia) Zagreb | (England) Pat Gibson | (England) Olav Bjortomt | (England) Kevin Ashman |
| 2018 | (Italy) Venice | (England) Pat Gibson | (Belgium) Tom Trogh | (Belgium) Ronny Swiggers |
| 2019 | (Bulgaria) Sofia | (England) Ian Bayley | (England) Kevin Ashman | (Finland) Tero Kalliolevo |
| 2021 | (Poland) Kraków | (Republic of Ireland) Mark Henry | (Belgium) Ronny Swiggers | (Finland) Tero Kalliolevo |
| 2022 | (Germany) Berlin | (Belgium) Ronny Swiggers | (Estonia) Kaarel Silmato | (England) Daoud Jackson |
| 2023 | (Spain) Torremolinos | (Croatia) Dean Kotiga | (England) Daoud Jackson | (United States) Victoria Groce (Finland) Tero Kalliolevo |
| 2024 | (Spain) Fuengirola | (England) Daoud Jackson | (Belgium) Ronny Swiggers | (Norway) Thomas Kolåsæter |
| 2025 | (Italy) Caserta | (Belgium) Ronny Swiggers | (Belgium) Tom Trogh | (Belgium) Lander Frederickx (Finland) Tero Kalliolevo |
| 2026 | (Bosnia and Herzegovina) Sarajevo | (Belgium) Tom Trogh | (Croatia) Domagoj Pozderac | (Finland) Tero Kalliolevo |

== Pairs champions ==
Introduced in 2005, Belgian and Anglo-Irish pairs have dominated this event.

| Year | Venue | Winners | Runners up | Third place |
|---|---|---|---|---|
| 2005 | (Estonia) Tallinn | (England) Ian Bayley/Pat Gibson | (Belgium) Marnix Baes/Bart Permentier | (Belgium) Nico Pattyn/Paul Arts |
| 2006 | (France) Lésigny | (Belgium) Paul Arts/Marc Van Springel | (England) Mark Bytheway/Kevin Ashman | (England) Keith Andrew/ (Wales) Sean O'Neill |
| 2007 | (England) Blackpool | (Belgium) Erik Derycke/Tom Trogh | (Belgium) Albert November/Ronny Swiggers and (Finland) Tero Kalliolevo/Jussi Suvanto | |
| 2008 | (Norway) Oslo | (Belgium) Albert November/Ronny Swiggers | (England) Olav Bjortomt/David Stainer | (England) Mark Bytheway/Kevin Ashman |
| 2009 | (Netherlands) Dordrecht | (England) Olav Bjortomt/David Stainer | (England) Ian Bayley/Pat Gibson | (England) Mark Bytheway/Kevin Ashman |
| 2010 | (England) Derby | (England) Kevin Ashman/Pat Gibson | (Finland) Tero Kalliolevo/Jussi Suvanto | (England) Olav Bjortomt/David Stainer |
| 2011 | (Belgium) Bruges | (England) Kevin Ashman/Pat Gibson | (Belgium) Erik Derycke/Tom Trogh | (England) Olav Bjortomt/David Stainer |
| 2012 | (Estonia) Tartu | (England) Kevin Ashman/Pat Gibson | (Finland) Tero Kalliolevo/Jussi Suvanto | (Germany) Holger Waldenberger/ (Croatia) Dorjana Širola |
| 2013 | (England) Liverpool | (England) Kevin Ashman/Pat Gibson | (England) Olav Bjortomt/David Stainer | (Finland) Tero Kalliolevo/Jussi Suvanto |
| 2014 | (Romania) Bucharest | (Finland) Tero Kalliolevo/ (Belgium) Ronny Swiggers | (England) Kevin Ashman/Pat Gibson | (England) Olav Bjortomt/David Stainer |
| 2015 | (Netherlands) Rotterdam | (England) Kevin Ashman/Pat Gibson | (England) Olav Bjortomt/David Stainer | (France) Didier Bruyere/ (England) Ian Bayley |
| 2016 | (Greece) Athens | (England) Kevin Ashman/Pat Gibson | (England) Olav Bjortomt/David Stainer | (France) Didier Bruyere/ (England) Ian Bayley |
| 2017 | (Croatia) Zagreb | (England) Kevin Ashman/Pat Gibson | (England) Olav Bjortomt/David Stainer | (France) Didier Bruyere/ (England) Ian Bayley |
| 2018 | (Italy) Venice | (Finland) Tero Kalliolevo/ (Belgium) Ronny Swiggers | (England) Kevin Ashman/Pat Gibson | (Belgium) Tom Trogh/Derk De Graaf |
| 2019 | (Bulgaria) Sofia | (England) Kevin Ashman/Pat Gibson | (France) Didier Bruyere/ (England) Ian Bayley | (England) Olav Bjortomt/David Stainer |
| 2021 | (Poland) Kraków | (Finland) Tero Kalliolevo/ (Belgium) Ronny Swiggers | (Belgium) Nico Pattyn/Jens Everaerdt | (Belgium) Tom Trogh/Derk De Graaf |
| 2022 | (Germany) Berlin | (United States) Victoria Groce/ (England) Kevin Ashman | (Finland) Tero Kalliolevo/ (Belgium) Ronny Swiggers | (Estonia) Igor Habal/Kaarel Silmato |
| 2023 | (Spain) Torremolinos | (United States) Victoria Groce/ (Norway) Thomas Kolåsæter | (Belgium) Tom Trogh/Tim van der Heyden | (Estonia) Igor Habal/Kaarel Silmato |
| 2024 | (Spain) Fuengirola | (Croatia) Dean Kotiga/ (England) Daoud Jackson | (United States) Victoria Groce/ (Norway) Thomas Kolåsæter | (England) Pat Gibson/ (England) Ian Bayley |
| 2025 | (Italy) Caserta | (Canada) Adam Hancock/ (United States) Anu Kashyap | (Belgium) Tim Van der Heyden/Tom Trogh | (Croatia) Dean Kotiga/ (England) Daoud Jackson |
| 2026 | (Bosnia and Herzegovina) Sarajevo | (Belgium) Tim Van der Heyden/Tom Trogh | (Canada) Adam Hancock/ (United States) Anu Kashyap | (England) Pat Gibson/ (England) Ian Bayley |

== National Team champions (four players each) ==
The English and Belgian teams have contested in most finals, England has won the most titles, nine. The foursome of Kevin Ashman, Mark Bytheway, Pat Gibson and Olav Bjortomt failed to retain the title in 2008 in Oslo, the winning Belgian team composed of Ronny Swiggers, Nico Pattyn, Erik Derycke, and Tom Trogh, but rebounded in 2009. In 2011 Finland became the third team to win the title, beating Norway in the final. The deciding question after the long and even match with tough questions was about a very common Nordic plant Hepatica. Both teams failed to answer correctly and Finland won. So far seven countries have won medals: England, Belgium, Finland, Norway, Estonia, USA and Croatia.

| Year | Venue | Winner | Runner up | Third place |
|---|---|---|---|---|
| 2004 | (Belgium) Ghent | England (Kevin Ashman, Pat Gibson, Barry Simmons, David Stainer) | Belgium Belgium (Erik Derycke, Nico Pattyn, Leo De Haes, Jean Marivoet) | |
| 2005 | (Estonia) Tallinn | Belgium (Patrick Andries, Erik Derycke, Nico Pattyn, Jo Vandenbroucke) | England (Kevin Ashman, Pat Gibson, Barry Simmons, David Stainer) | |
| 2006 | (France) Lésigny | Belgium (Erik Derycke, Nico Pattyn, Tom Trogh, Marc Van Springel) | England (Kevin Ashman, Ian Bayley, Olav Bjortomt, Pat Gibson) | Norway (Trine Aalborg, Harald Aastorp, Dag Fjeldstad, Marie Haavik) |
| 2007 | (England) Blackpool | England (Kevin Ashman, Mark Bytheway, Pat Gibson, David Stainer) | Belgium (Erik Derycke, Nico Pattyn, Ronny Swiggers, Tom Trogh) | Norway (Trine Aalborg, Tore Dahl, Thomas Kolåsæter, Ole Martin Halck) and Finland (Tero Kalliolevo, Jussi Suvanto, Tuomas Tumi) |
| 2008 | (Norway) Oslo | Belgium (Erik Derycke, Nico Pattyn, Ronny Swiggers, Tom Trogh) | England (Kevin Ashman, Olav Bjortomt, Mark Bytheway, Pat Gibson) | Finland (Tero Kalliolevo, Jussi Suvanto, Tuomas Tumi) |
| 2009 | (Netherlands) Dordrecht | England (Kevin Ashman, Olav Bjortomt, Mark Bytheway, Pat Gibson) | Belgium (Erik Derycke, Nico Pattyn, Ronny Swiggers, Tom Trogh) | Norway (Harald Aastorp, Ole Martin Halck, Lars Heggland, Thomas Kolåsæter) |
| 2010 | (England) Derby | England (Kevin Ashman, Olav Bjortomt, Pat Gibson, Jesse Honey) | Belgium (Erik Derycke, Nico Pattyn, Ronny Swiggers, Tom Trogh) | Finland (Tero Kalliolevo, Jussi Suvanto, Timo Toivonen, Tuomas Tumi) |
| 2011 | (Belgium) Bruges | Finland (Tero Kalliolevo, Jussi Suvanto, Timo Toivonen, Tuomas Tumi) | Norway (Tore Dahl, Ole Martin Halck, Lars Heggland, Thomas Kolåsæter) | Belgium (Erik Derycke, Nico Pattyn, Ronny Swiggers, Tom Trogh) |
| 2012 | (Estonia) Tartu | England (Kevin Ashman, Olav Bjortomt, Pat Gibson, Jesse Honey) | Finland (Tero Kalliolevo, Jussi Suvanto, Ilkka Tiensuu, Timo Toivonen) | Belgium (Bernard Kreps, Nico Pattyn, Ronny Swiggers, Tom Trogh) |
| 2013 | (England) Liverpool | England (Kevin Ashman, Olav Bjortomt, Pat Gibson, Jesse Honey) | Belgium (Erik Derycke, Nico Pattyn, Ronny Swiggers, Tom Trogh) | Norway (Harald Aastorp, Tore Dahl, Ole Martin Halck, Thomas Kolåsæter) |
| 2014 | (Romania) Bucharest | England (Kevin Ashman, Ian Bayley, Olav Bjortomt, Pat Gibson) | Belgium (Nico Pattyn, Gerben Smit, Ronny Swiggers, Lars Van Moer) | Norway (Harald Aastorp, Ole Martin Halck, Thomas Kolåsæter, Geir Kristiansen) |
| 2015 | (Netherlands) Rotterdam | England (Kevin Ashman, Ian Bayley, Olav Bjortomt, Pat Gibson) | Belgium (Erik Derycke, Nico Pattyn, Ronny Swiggers, Tom Trogh) | Estonia (Ove Põder, Igor Habal, Illar Tõnisson, Tauno Vahter) |
| 2016 | (Greece) Athens | England (Kevin Ashman, Ian Bayley, Olav Bjortomt, Pat Gibson) | Belgium (Gerben Smit, Stijn Gyselinckx, Nico Pattyn, Ronny Swiggers) | Norway (Tore Dahl, Ole Martin Halck, Thomas Kolåsæter, Geir Kristiansen) |
| 2017 | (Croatia) Zagreb | England (Kevin Ashman, Ian Bayley, Olav Bjortomt, Pat Gibson) | Belgium (Gerben Smit, Nico Pattyn, Ronny Swiggers, Tom Trogh) | Finland (Tero Kalliolevo, Jussi Suvanto, Tuomas Tumi) |
| 2018 | (Italy) Venice | Norway (Tore Dahl, Ole Martin Halck, Lars Heggland, Thomas Kolåsæter) | Belgium (Nico Pattyn, Gerben Smit, Ronny Swiggers, Tom Trogh) | England (Kevin Ashman, Ian Bayley, Olav Bjortomt, Pat Gibson) |
| 2019 | (Bulgaria) Sofia | England (Kevin Ashman, Ian Bayley, Olav Bjortomt, Pat Gibson) | Belgium (Lander Frederickx, Nico Pattyn, Ronny Swiggers, Tom Trogh) | Norway (Tore Dahl, Ole Martin Halck, Thomas Kolåsæter, Geir Kristiansen) |
| 2021 | (Poland) Kraków | Belgium (Lander Frederickx, Nico Pattyn, Ronny Swiggers, Tom Trogh) | Estonia (Ove Põder, Igor Habal, Illar Tõnisson, Kaarel Silmato) | England (Ian Bayley, Daoud Jackson, Ned Pendleton, Matt Todd) |
| 2022 | (Germany) Berlin | Belgium (Lander Frederickx, Nico Pattyn, Ronny Swiggers, Tom Trogh) | Estonia (Ove Põder, Igor Habal, Illar Tõnisson, Kaarel Silmato) | England (Kevin Ashman, Ian Bayley, Daoud Jackson, Ned Pendleton) |
| 2023 | (Spain) Torremolinos | United States (Victoria Groce, Brandon Blackwell, Shane Whitlock, Steve Perry) | Belgium (Lander Frederickx, Nico Pattyn, Ronny Swiggers, Tom Trogh) | England (Kevin Ashman, Ian Bayley, Olav Bjortomt, Pat Gibson) |
| 2024 | (Spain) Fuengirola | United States (Andrew Ullsperger, Brandon Blackwell, Victoria Groce, Shane Whitlock) | Belgium (Nico Pattyn, Tom Trogh, Ronny Swiggers, Lander Frederickx) | England (Daoud Jackson, Evan Lynch, Ian Bayley, Pat Gibson) |
| 2025 | (Italy) Caserta | England (Pat Gibson, Daoud Jackson, Ian Bayley, Evan Lynch) | Croatia (Neven Trgovec, Dean Kotiga, Lovro Jurišić, Domagoj Pozderac) | Belgium (Lander Frederickx, Tim Van der Heyden, Dries Van De Sande, Tom Trogh) |
| 2026 | (Bosnia and Herzegovina) Sarajevo | Belgium (Lander Frederickx, Tim Van der Heyden, Dries Van De Sande, Tom Trogh) | United States (Anu Kashyap, Raj Dhuwalia, Jakob Myers, Shane Whitlock) | Croatia (Neven Trgovec, Dean Kotiga, Lovro Jurišić, Domagoj Pozderac) |

== Club champions (four players each) ==
After the first years the event was dominated by two British teams. Since 2007 the questions have been set by a team of quizmasters from different nationalities, in order to eliminate too much local flavour. Milhous Warriors (2006 line-up Kevin Ashman, Mark Bytheway, Tim Westcott, Sean O'Neill) who won in Lésigny in 2006. Broken Hearts (Olav Bjortomt, Ian Bayley, Mark Grant, David Stainer) made it three straight 2007-2009, then it was Milhous again with Pat Gibson replacing the late Mark Bytheway. 2012 winner JFGI was the first champion to have quizzers from several countries: Tero Kalliolevo and Jussi Suvanto from Finland, Ove Põder and Tauno Vahter from Estonia. In 2012, 2014, 2017, 2018, 2021 and 2022 all top three teams included several nationalities.

| Year | Venue | Winner | Runner up | Third place |
|---|---|---|---|---|
| 2003 | (England) Bromley | Café Den Hemel (Paul Arts, Eric Moereels, Nico Pattyn, Marc Roels) | Clockwork (Marnix Baes, Erik Derycke, Bart Permentier, Goele Van Roy) | Beunhazen (Patrick Begaux, Yvo Gheyskens, Eric Hemelaers, ) |
| 2004 | (Belgium) Ghent | Martine Van Camp | Here Jezus | Beunhazen |
| 2005 | (Estonia) Tallinn | Duubel (Ove Põder, Tauno Vahter, Rein Põder, Peeter-Erik Kubo) | Turvas (Jaan Allik, Leino Pahtma, Matis Song, Alar Särgava) | Kalamaja Tsirkus (Anne-Malle Hallik, Madis Replik, Tenno Sivadi, Alar Tiidt) |
| 2006 | (France) Lésigny | Milhous Warriors (Kevin Ashman, Mark Bytheway, Tim Westcott, Sean O'Neill) | Geeks | Les Coeurs blessés |
| 2007 | (England) Blackpool | Broken Hearts (Ian Bayley, Olav Bjortomt, Mark Grant, David Stainer) | Clockwork (Marnix Baes, Erik Derycke, Bart Permentier, Tom Trogh) | Café Den Hemel (Paul Arts, Chris Braxel, Eric Hemelaers, Nico Pattyn) |
| 2008 | (Norway) Oslo | Broken Hearts (Ian Bayley, Olav Bjortomt, Mark Grant, David Stainer) | It's Grim Oop North (Pat Gibson, Barry Simmons, Rob Hannah, David Edwards) | JFGI (Tero Kalliolevo, Ove Põder, Jussi Suvanto, Tauno Vahter) |
| 2009 | (Netherlands) Dordrecht | Broken Hearts (Ian Bayley, Olav Bjortomt, Mark Grant, David Stainer) | JFGI (Tero Kalliolevo, Ove Põder, Jussi Suvanto, Tauno Vahter) | Vatican City (Gerben Smit, Bart ???, Nick Mills, Dag Fjeldstad) |
| 2010 | (England) Derby | Milhous Warriors (Kevin Ashman, Pat Gibson, Sean O’Neill, Tim Westcott) | Broken Hearts (Ian Bayley, Olav Bjortomt, Mark Grant, David Stainer) | Clockwork (Marnix Baes, Erik Derycke, Bart Permentier, Tom Trogh) |
| 2011 | (Belgium) Bruges | Broken Hearts (Ian Bayley, Olav Bjortomt, Mark Grant, Jesse Honey) | Europalia (Derk De Graaf, Thomas Kolåsæter, Dorjana Širola, Holger Waldenberger) | JFGI (Tero Kalliolevo, Ove Põder, Jussi Suvanto, Tauno Vahter) |
| 2012 | (Estonia) Tartu | JFGI (Tero Kalliolevo, Ove Põder, Jussi Suvanto, Tauno Vahter) | Europalia (Derk De Graaf, Thomas Kolåsæter, Dorjana Širola, Holger Waldenberger) | Alzheimer (Ronny Swiggers, Bernard Kreps, Staf Dujardin, Ed Toutant) |
| 2013 | (England) Liverpool | Milhous Warriors (Kevin Ashman, Pat Gibson, Sean O’Neill, Tim Westcott) | JFGI (Tero Kalliolevo, Ove Põder, Jussi Suvanto, Tauno Vahter) | Clockwork (Marnix Baes, Erik Derycke, Bart Permentier, Tom Trogh) |
| 2014 | (Romania) Bucharest | Broken Hearts (Ian Bayley, Olav Bjortomt, Mark Grant, Didier Bruyere) | JFBI (Tero Kalliolevo, Ove Põder, Igor Habal, Tauno Vahter) | Europalia (Derk De Graaf, Thomas Kolåsæter, Dorjana Širola, Holger Waldenberger) |
| 2015 | (Netherlands) Rotterdam | Broken Hearts (Ian Bayley, Olav Bjortomt, Mark Grant, Didier Bruyere) | Clockwork (Tom Trogh, Bart Permentier, Erik Derycke, Marnix Baes) | Europalia (Derk De Graaf, Thomas Kolåsæter, Dorjana Širola, Holger Waldenberger) |
| 2016 | (Greece) Athens | Café Den Hemel (Paul Arts, Chris Braxel, Nico Pattyn, Ronny Swiggers) | Broken Hearts (Ian Bayley, Olav Bjortomt, Mark Grant, Didier Bruyere) | Milhous Warriors (Kevin Ashman, Pat Gibson, Sean O’Neill, Tim Westcott) |
| 2017 | (Croatia) Zagreb | Europalia (Derk De Graaf, Thomas Kolåsæter, Dorjana Širola, Holger Waldenberger) | JFGI (Tero Kalliolevo, Ove Põder, Jussi Suvanto, Tauno Vahter) | Sage Supercilia (Igor Habal, Mark Henry, Sebastian Klussmann, Mark Ryder) |
| 2018 | (Italy) Venice | Sage Supercilia (Igor Habal, Mark Henry, Sebastian Klussmann, Mark Ryder) | Europalia (Derk De Graaf, Thomas Kolåsæter, Dorjana Širola, Holger Waldenberger) | Molly McGuires (Lorcan Duff, Steve Perry, Tim Polley, Shane Whitlock) |
| 2019 | (Bulgaria) Sofia | Sage Supercilia (Igor Habal, Mark Henry, Sebastian Klussmann, Mark Ryder) | Broken Hearts (Ian Bayley, Olav Bjortomt, Mark Grant, Didier Bruyere) | Milhous Warriors (Kevin Ashman, Pat Gibson, Sean O'Neill, Tim Westcott) |
| 2021 | (Poland) Kraków | JFDDGI (Tero Kalliolevo, Ove Põder, Kaarel Silmato, Tauno Vahter) | The Rolling Scones (Daoud Jackson, Dean Kotiga, Neven Trgovec, Shane Whitlock) | Sage Supercilia (Igor Habal, Mark Henry, Sebastian Klussmann, Mark Ryder) |
| 2022 | (Germany) Berlin | The New Janitors (Kevin Ashman, Victoria Groce, Thomas Kolåsæter, Thomas De Bock) | The Rolling Scones (Daoud Jackson, Dean Kotiga, Neven Trgovec, Shane Whitlock) | JFSI (Tero Kalliolevo, Ove Põder, Kaarel Silmato, Jussi Suvanto) |
| 2023 | (Spain) Torremolinos | The Rolling Scones (Daoud Jackson, Dean Kotiga, Neven Trgovec, Shane Whitlock) | The New Janitors (Victoria Groce, Thomas Kolåsæter, Derk de Graaf, Steve Perry) | Broken Hearts (Mark Grant, Pat Gibson, Ian Bayley, Olav Bjortomt) |
| 2024 | (Spain) Fuengirola | The New Janitors (Thomas Kolåsæter, Victoria Groce, Andrew Ullsperger, Derk de Graaf) | The Rolling Scones (Dean Kotiga, Shane Whitlock, Neven Trgovec, Daoud Jackson) | Broken Hearts (Pat Gibson, Ian Bayley, Jack Pollock, Hugh Bennett) |
| 2025 | (Italy) Caserta | The Rolling Scones (Dean Kotiga, Neven Trgovec, Daoud Jackson, Shane Whitlock) | Viva Vanvitelli (Ronny Swiggers, Ivan Andonov, Derk de Graaf, Wim Vanrie) | Ducks Ahoy! (Ole Martin Halck, Tore Heliks Van Dahl, Toril Opsahl, Aldona Szczepanska) |
| 2026 | (Bosnia and Herzegovina) Sarajevo | Les Têtes Brulées (Ronny Swiggers, Derk de Graaf, Wim Vanrie, Gert-Jan Dugardein) | X-Tremisten (Dries van de Sande, Lander Frederickx, Luc Lenaerts, Tom Trogh) | Café Den Hemel (Paul Arts, Maurice D'hiet, Nico Pattyn, Pieter Poelaert) |

== Aspirational Cup champions (four players each) ==
People not involved in the National Team Quiz can form teams of four to contest the Aspirational Cup instead. This alternative competition uses the same format as, and runs in parallel to, the National Team Quiz. For the Aspirational Cup, teams can be made up with players from anywhere.

| Year | Venue | Winner | Runner up | Third place |
|---|---|---|---|---|
| 2006 | (France) Lésigny | Norway B | Rest of the World | |
| 2007 | (England) Blackpool | England A | Belgian Anarchy | |
| 2008 | (Norway) Oslo | The Smurfs (Bart Permentier, Marnix Baes, Koen Vervremd, Stijn Vanacker) | England B | Lars & The Medics |
| 2009 | (Netherlands) Dordrecht | England B (Ian Bayley, David Stainer, Kathryn Johnson, Nick Mills) | The Smurfs (Bart Permentier, Marnix Baes, Koen Vervremd, Jo Vandenbroucke) | Lars & The Medics |
| 2010 | (England) Derby | England B (Ian Bayley, David Stainer, Kathryn Johnson, Nick Mills) | Kramerica (Paul Bailey, Mark Ryder, Ed Toutant, Dorjana Širola) | The Smurfs |
| 2011 | (Belgium) Bruges | Lars & The Medics | Team Sealand | Popular People's Front of Judea |
| 2012 | (Estonia) Tartu | Thiamine (Ian Bayley, Kathryn Johnson, David Lea, Phil Smith) | Popular Judean Front | Norway B (Ole Martin Halck, Knut Heggland, Eivind Moskvil, Stig Sanner) |
| 2013 | (England) Liverpool | Lars & The Medics | Thiamine | |
| 2014 | (Romania) Bucharest | Intercontinental Drift (Mark Henry, Leslie Shannon, Gerard Mackay, Todor Milak) | England B (David Stainer, Kathryn Johnson, Paul Sinha, Paul Steeples) | |
| 2015 | (Netherlands) Rotterdam | Bastogne Nuts (David Beck, Mark Ryder, Misja De Ridder, Steven Kesteloot) | Seal Cub Clubbing Club (Tero Kalliolevo, Øystein Aadnevik, Jarle Kvåle, Eivind Moskvil) | |
| 2016 | (Greece) Athens | England B (David Stainer, Hugh Bennett, Paul Sinha, Nick Mills) | Belgian Anarchy | |
| 2017 | (Croatia) Zagreb | Young England (Hugh Bennett, Jack Bennett, Ned Pendleton, Oliver Levy) | Team USA (Mark Ryder, Tim Polley, Raj Dhuwalia, Shane Whitlock) | England B (David Stainer, Paul Sinha, Jamie Dodding, Nick Mills) |
| 2018 | (Italy) Venice | X-Tremisten (Dries Van De Sande, Lander Frederickx, Stijn Gyselinckx, Lars Van Moer) | Belgian Anarchy (Paul Arts, Chris Braxel, Kris Van der Coelden, Luc Venstermans) | Norway B (Geir Kristiansen, Espen Kibsgård, Øystein Aadnevik, Dag Olav Rønning) |
| 2019 | (Bulgaria) Sofia | England B (David Stainer, Paul Sinha, Hugh Bennett, Daoud Jackson) | Norway B (Lars Heggland, Arild Tørum, Espen Kibsgård, Eivind Moskvil) | Young England (Ned Pendleton, Jack Bennett, Joey Goldman, Oliver Levy) |
| 2021 | (Poland) Kraków | LucV Forever (Paul Arts, Jens Everaerdt, Kris Van der Coelden, Tero Kalliolevo) | Norway B (Lars Heggland, Arild Tørum, Espen Kibsgård, Mats Sigstad) | The Ruins of Empire (Ian Clark, Mark Ryder, Amit De, Tim Westcott) |
| 2022 | (Germany) Berlin | De wezen van zeekameel (Luc Lenaerts, Ivo Geyskens, Johnny Loodts, Gerben Smit) | Norway B (Espen Kibsgård, Lars Heggland, Mats Sigstad, Eivind Moskvil) | Kumova slama (Lovro Jurišić, Lucian Šošić, Perica Živanović, Mario Kovač) |
| 2023 | (Spain) Torremolinos | Belgian Finnish Anarchy (Paul Arts, Tero Kalliolevo, Jens Everaerdt, Derk de Graaf) | England Expects (Ned Pendleton, Toby Cox, Daoud Jackson, Matt Todd) | England Aspires (Paul Sinha, Sarah Trevarthen, Amit De, Oliver Levy) |
| 2024 | (Spain) Fuengirola | USA B (Matt Jackson, Raj Dhuwalia, Anu Kashyap, Jeffrey Seguritan) | The League of Very Mediocre Wingmen (Dries Van De Sande, Gert-Jan Dugardein, Luc Lenaerts, Tim Van der Heyde) | England B (Amit De, Matt Todd, Hugh Bennett, Andrew Whittingham) |
| 2025 | (Italy) Caserta | Under Siege (Luc Lenaerts, Nico Pattyn, Maurice D'hiet, Pieter Poelaert) | England B (Matt Todd, Amit De, Toby Cox, George Scratcherd) | Belgian Finnish Anarchy (Paul Arts, Ronny Swiggers, Tero Kalliolevo, Derk de Graaf) |
| 2026 | (Bosnia and Herzegovina) Sarajevo | Under Siege (Luc Lenaerts, Nico Pattyn, Maurice D'hiet, Pieter Poelaert) | Belgian Finnish Anarchy (Paul Arts, Ronny Swiggers, Tero Kalliolevo, Derk de Graaf) | The Motley Crew (Amit De, Stefan Grnčarski, Mark Ryder, Jerome Vered) |

== Specialist quizzes ==
Making their debut at the 2016 Quiz Olympiad, specialist quizzes are individual events consisting of 50 questions across two papers, each of 25 questions. For each non-Olympiad event different specialist subjects are chosen. They are categorised as High Brow (Beliefs, Geography, History, Literature, Nature, Performing Arts, Sciences, Visual Arts) or Populist (21st Century, Business, Digital World, Film, Food and Drink, Pop Music, Sport, Television).

=== Beliefs ===
| Year | Venue | Winner | Runner up | Third place |
|---|---|---|---|---|
| 2025 | (Italy) Caserta | (England) Daoud Jackson (Finland) Tero Kalliolevo | not awarded (tie for gold) | (England) Evan Lynch |
| 2026 | (Bosnia and Herzegovina) Sarajevo | Not included in the program | | |

=== Geography ===
| Year | Venue | Winner | Runner up | Third place |
|---|---|---|---|---|
| 2016 | (Greece) Athens | (Belgium) Paul Arts | (Belgium) Nico Pattyn | (England) Kevin Ashman |
| 2017 | (Croatia) Zagreb | Not included in the program | | |
| 2018 | (Italy) Venice | Not included in the program | | |
| 2019 | (Bulgaria) Sofia | (Belgium) Nico Pattyn | (Belgium) Franky Soetens | (England) Kevin Ashman |
| 2021 | (Poland) Kraków | (Estonia) Ove Põder (Belgium) Paul Arts | not awarded (tie for gold) | (United States) Jakob Myers (United States) Shane Whitlock |
| 2022 | (Germany) Berlin | Not included in the program | | |
| 2023 | (Spain) Torremolinos | (Belgium) Nico Pattyn | (Estonia) Igor Habal (Belgium) Paul Arts (United States) Victoria Groce | not awarded (tie for silver) |
| 2024 | (Spain) Fuengirola | (Belgium) Paul Arts | (Belgium) Nico Pattyn | (Germany) Manuel Hobiger |
| 2025 | (Italy) Caserta | Not included in the program | | |
| 2026 | (Bosnia and Herzegovina) Sarajevo | (Belgium) Nico Pattyn | (Belgium) Paul Arts | (United States) Jakob Myers (Scotland) Jack Pollock (England) Pat Gibson |

=== History ===
| Year | Venue | Winner | Runner up | Third place |
|---|---|---|---|---|
| 2016 | (Greece) Athens | (England) Kevin Ashman | (Belgium) Nico Pattyn | (Estonia) Ove Põder |
| 2017 | (Croatia) Zagreb | (Belgium) Nico Pattyn | (England) Kevin Ashman | (Estonia) Ove Põder |
| 2018 | (Italy) Venice | Not included in the program | | |
| 2019 | (Bulgaria) Sofia | Not included in the program | | |
| 2021 | (Poland) Kraków | (United States) Jakob Myers (Belgium) Nico Pattyn | not awarded (tie for gold) | (United States) Matt Jackson |
| 2022 | (Germany) Berlin | (Estonia) Ove Põder | (England) Daoud Jackson (England) Kevin Ashman | not awarded (tie for silver) |
| 2023 | (Spain) Torremolinos | Not included in the program | | |
| 2024 | (Spain) Fuengirola | (Belgium) Nico Pattyn | (United States) Matt Jackson (England) Ian Bayley | not awarded (tie for silver) |
| 2025 | (Italy) Caserta | Not included in the program | | |
| 2026 | (Bosnia and Herzegovina) Sarajevo | Not included in the program | | |

=== Literature ===
| Year | Venue | Winner | Runner up | Third place |
|---|---|---|---|---|
| 2016 | (Greece) Athens | (England) Olav Bjortomt | (England) Kevin Ashman | (Estonia) Igor Habal |
| 2017 | (Croatia) Zagreb | Not included in the program | | |
| 2018 | (Italy) Venice | (England) Olav Bjortomt | (England) Kevin Ashman | (Finland) Tero Kalliolevo |
| 2019 | (Bulgaria) Sofia | Not included in the program | | |
| 2021 | (Poland) Kraków | (England) Daoud Jackson (Norway) Ole Martin Halck | not awarded (tie for gold) | (United States) Matt Jackson |
| 2022 | (Germany) Berlin | Not included in the program | | |
| 2023 | (Spain) Torremolinos | (Croatia) Dean Kotiga (United States) Victoria Groce | not awarded (tie for gold) | (England) Daoud Jackson (England) Olav Bjortomt |
| 2024 | (Spain) Fuengirola | (Belgium) Tim van der Heyden | (Belgium) Lander Frederickx | (England) Evan Lynch (United States) Victoria Groce |
| 2025 | (Italy) Caserta | Not included in the program | | |
| 2026 | (Bosnia and Herzegovina) Sarajevo | (England) Olav Bjortomt | (Canada) Adam Hancock (England) Daoud Jackson | not awarded (tie for silver) |

=== Nature ===
| Year | Venue | Winner | Runner up | Third place |
|---|---|---|---|---|
| 2024 | (Spain) Fuengirola | (Belgium) Lander Frederickx | (England) Pat Gibson | (England) Daoud Jackson |
| 2025 | (Italy) Caserta | Not included in the program | | |
| 2026 | (Bosnia and Herzegovina) Sarajevo | Not included in the program | | |

=== Performing Arts ===
| Year | Venue | Winner | Runner up | Third place |
|---|---|---|---|---|
| 2016 | (Greece) Athens | (England) Kevin Ashman | (England) Pat Gibson | (England) Kathryn Johnson |
| 2017 | (Croatia) Zagreb | Not included in the program | | |
| 2018 | (Italy) Venice | Not included in the program | | |
| 2019 | (Bulgaria) Sofia | (Croatia) Mario Kovač | (Finland) Jussi Suvanto | (England) Kevin Ashman |
| 2021 | (Poland) Kraków | (England) Daoud Jackson | (England) Ian Bayley | (United States) Matt Jackson |
| 2022 | (Germany) Berlin | Not included in the program | | |
| 2023 | (Spain) Torremolinos | Not included in the program | | |
| 2024 | (Spain) Fuengirola | Not included in the program | | |
| 2025 | (Italy) Caserta | Not included in the program | | |
| 2026 | (Bosnia and Herzegovina) Sarajevo | Not included in the program | | |

=== Sciences ===
| Year | Venue | Winner | Runner up | Third place |
|---|---|---|---|---|
| 2016 | (Greece) Athens | (England) Pat Gibson | (England) Ian Bayley | (England) Kevin Ashman |
| 2017 | (Croatia) Zagreb | (England) Ian Bayley | (United States) Raj Dhuwalia | (Belgium) Tom Trogh |
| 2018 | (Italy) Venice | Not included in the program | | |
| 2019 | (Bulgaria) Sofia | Not included in the program | | |
| 2021 | (Poland) Kraków | (England) Ian Bayley | (United States) Raj Dhuwalia | (Scotland) Jack Pollock (Belgium) Lander Frederickx (United States) Matt Jackson |
| 2022 | (Germany) Berlin | Not included in the program | | |
| 2023 | (Spain) Torremolinos | Not included in the program | | |
| 2024 | (Spain) Fuengirola | (England) Evan Lynch | (United States) Andrew Ullsperger | (Belgium) Lander Frederickx |
| 2025 | (Italy) Caserta | (England) Evan Lynch | (England) Ian Bailey (England) Pat Gibson | not awarded (tie for silver) |
| 2026 | (Bosnia and Herzegovina) Sarajevo | Not included in the program | | |

=== Visual Arts ===
| Year | Venue | Winner | Runner up | Third place |
|---|---|---|---|---|
| 2016 | (Greece) Athens | (England) Kevin Ashman | (Belgium) Ronny Swiggers | (England) Olav Bjortomt |
| 2017 | (Croatia) Zagreb | Not included in the program | | |
| 2018 | (Italy) Venice | (England) Olav Bjortomt | (England) Kevin Ashman | (Belgium) Jens Everaerdt (Belgium) Nico Pattyn |
| 2019 | (Bulgaria) Sofia | Not included in the program | | |
| 2021 | (Poland) Kraków | (Belgium) Ronny Swiggers | (Croatia) Domagoj Pozderac | (England) Ian Bayley |
| 2022 | (Germany) Berlin | (Belgium) Jens Everaerdt | (Belgium) Ronny Swiggers | (Croatia) Dean Kotiga |
| 2023 | (Spain) Torremolinos | Not included in the program | | |
| 2024 | (Spain) Fuengirola | (United States) Victoria Groce (Scotland) Jack Pollock | not awarded (tie for gold) | (Belgium) Tim van der Heyden (Belgium) Ronny Swiggers (United States) Alan Lin |
| 2025 | (Italy) Caserta | Not included in the program | | |
| 2026 | (Bosnia and Herzegovina) Sarajevo | Not included in the program | | |

=== 21st Century ===
| Year | Venue | Winner | Runner up | Third place |
|---|---|---|---|---|
| 2026 | (Bosnia and Herzegovina) Sarajevo | (Croatia) Domagoj Pozderac (England) Evan Lynch | not awarded (tie for gold) | (Belgium) Maurice D'hiet |

=== Business ===
| Year | Venue | Winner | Runner up | Third place |
|---|---|---|---|---|
| 2016 | (Greece) Athens | (Netherlands) Ujjwal Deb | (Finland) Leslie Shannon | (Netherlands) Abel Gilsing |
| 2017 | (Croatia) Zagreb | Not included in the program | | |
| 2018 | (Italy) Venice | Not included in the program | | |
| 2019 | (Bulgaria) Sofia | (England) Pat Gibson | (Wales) Mark Grant | (Denmark) Anton Jacobsen |
| 2021 | (Poland) Kraków | (Germany) Sebastian Klussmann | (Belgium) Tom Trogh | (Denmark) Anton Jacobsen (Belgium) Derk de Graaf |
| 2022 | (Germany) Berlin | Not included in the program | | |
| 2023 | (Spain) Torremolinos | Not included in the program | | |
| 2024 | (Spain) Fuengirola | Not included in the program | | |
| 2025 | (Italy) Caserta | Not included in the program | | |
| 2026 | (Bosnia and Herzegovina) Sarajevo | Not included in the program | | |

=== Digital World ===
| Year | Venue | Winner | Runner up | Third place |
|---|---|---|---|---|
| 2016 | (Greece) Athens | (Netherlands) Michael-Dennis Biemans | (Norway) Knut Heggland | (United States) Brandon Blackwell |
| 2017 | (Croatia) Zagreb | Not included in the program | | |
| 2018 | (Italy) Venice | (Netherlands) Michael-Dennis Biemans | (France) Frédéric Faucheux | (Belgium) Tom Trogh |
| 2019 | (Bulgaria) Sofia | Not included in the program | | |
| 2021 | (Poland) Kraków | (Belgium) Tom Trogh | (Netherlands) Michael-Dennis Biemans | (United States) Brandon Blackwell (Austria) Johannes Eibl |
| 2022 | (Germany) Berlin | Not included in the program | | |
| 2023 | (Spain) Torremolinos | Not included in the program | | |
| 2024 | (Spain) Fuengirola | (Belgium) Tom Trogh | (United States) Brandon Blackwell | (Australia) Marc Cheong |
| 2025 | (Italy) Caserta | Not included in the program | | |
| 2026 | (Bosnia and Herzegovina) Sarajevo | Not included in the program | | |

=== Film ===
| Year | Venue | Winner | Runner up | Third place |
|---|---|---|---|---|
| 2016 | (Greece) Athens | (England) Olav Bjortomt | (United States) Ken Jennings | (Wales) Mark Grant |
| 2017 | (Croatia) Zagreb | (England) Olav Bjortomt | (Finland) Jussi Suvanto | (Republic of Ireland) Lorcan Duff |
| 2018 | (Italy) Venice | Not included in the program | | |
| 2019 | (Bulgaria) Sofia | Not included in the program | | |
| 2021 | (Poland) Kraków | (United States) Clifford Galiher | (Croatia) Krešimir Štimac (Norway) Leif-Atle Heen | not awarded (tie for silver) |
| 2022 | (Germany) Berlin | (England) Kevin Ashman | (Finland) Jussi Suvanto | (Estonia) Kaarel Silmato |
| 2023 | (Spain) Torremolinos | Not included in the program | | |
| 2024 | (Spain) Fuengirola | (United States) Clifford Galiher | (Croatia) Dean Kotiga | (Germany) Sebastian Milpetz |
| 2025 | (Italy) Caserta | (Scotland) Ewan Munro (Germany) Lorenz Wirth | not awarded (tie for gold) | (Estonia) Kaarel Silmato |
| 2026 | (Bosnia and Herzegovina) Sarajevo | Not included in the program | | |

=== Food and Drink ===
| Year | Venue | Winner | Runner up | Third place |
|---|---|---|---|---|
| 2024 | (Spain) Fuengirola | (England) Daoud Jackson | (United States) Kathryn Verwillow (United States) Andrew Ullsperger (United States) Jeff Richmond | not awarded (tie for silver) |
| 2025 | (Italy) Caserta | Not included in the program | | |
| 2026 | (Bosnia and Herzegovina) Sarajevo | Not included in the program | | |

=== Pop Music ===
| Year | Venue | Winner | Runner up | Third place |
|---|---|---|---|---|
| 2016 | (Greece) Athens | (Republic of Ireland) Lorcan Duff | (England) David Stainer | (Belgium) Ronny Swiggers |
| 2017 | (Croatia) Zagreb | Not included in the program | | |
| 2018 | (Italy) Venice | (Belgium) Lars Van Moer | (Republic of Ireland) Lorcan Duff | (England) David Stainer |
| 2019 | (Bulgaria) Sofia | Not included in the program | | |
| 2021 | (Poland) Kraków | (Belgium) Lander Frederickx | (Estonia) Igor Habal | (Belgium) Tom Trogh |
| 2022 | (Germany) Berlin | Not included in the program | | |
| 2023 | (Spain) Torremolinos | (Netherlands) Guido ter Stege | (United States) Victoria Groce | (Belgium) Lander Frederickx |
| 2024 | (Spain) Fuengirola | (Netherlands) Guido ter Stege (Belgium) Lars van Moer | not awarded (tie for gold) | (Belgium) Tom Trogh |
| 2025 | (Italy) Caserta | Not included in the program | | |
| 2026 | (Bosnia and Herzegovina) Sarajevo | (Netherlands) Guido ter Stege (Belgium) Dries Van De Sande | not awarded (tie for gold) | (Belgium) Tom Trogh |

=== Sport ===
| Year | Venue | Winner | Runner up | Third place |
|---|---|---|---|---|
| 2016 | (Greece) Athens | (Estonia) Igor Habal | (Croatia) Perica Živanović | (Estonia) Illar Tõnisson |
| 2017 | (Croatia) Zagreb | (Wales) Chris James (Estonia) Igor Habal | not awarded (tie for gold) | (Republic of Ireland) Lorcan Duff |
| 2018 | (Italy) Venice | Not included in the program | | |
| 2019 | (Bulgaria) Sofia | Not included in the program | | |
| 2021 | (Poland) Kraków | (Belgium) Bruno De Laet | (Belgium) Dries Van De Sande (Belgium) Tom Trogh | not awarded (tie for silver) |
| 2022 | (Germany) Berlin | (Estonia) Igor Habal (Croatia) Neven Trgovec (Belgium) Tom Trogh | not awarded (tie for gold) | not awarded (tie for gold) |
| 2023 | (Spain) Torremolinos | Not included in the program | | |
| 2024 | (Spain) Fuengirola | (Belgium) Dries van de Sande | (Belgium) Tom Trogh (Estonia) Igor Habal | not awarded (tie for silver) |
| 2025 | (Italy) Caserta | (Croatia) Neven Trgovec | (Republic of Ireland) Mark Henry (Croatia) Perica Zivanovic | not awarded (tie for silver) |
| 2026 | (Bosnia and Herzegovina) Sarajevo | Not included in the program | | |

=== Television ===
| Year | Venue | Winner | Runner up | Third place |
|---|---|---|---|---|
| 2016 | (Greece) Athens | (Republic of Ireland) Lorcan Duff | (Norway) Brage Nordgård | (England) Jenny Ryan |
| 2017 | (Croatia) Zagreb | Not included in the program | | |
| 2018 | (Italy) Venice | Not included in the program | | |
| 2019 | (Bulgaria) Sofia | (England) Olav Bjortomt | (Finland) Jussi Suvanto | (Republic of Ireland) Lorcan Duff |
| 2021 | (Poland) Kraków | (Norway) Espen Iversen | (Norway) Arild Tørum (Scotland) Galen Chung (Croatia) Krešimir Štimac (Norway) Sonja Sirnes (Belgium) Stijn Gyselinckx | not awarded (tie for silver) |
| 2022 | (Germany) Berlin | Not included in the program | | |
| 2023 | (Spain) Torremolinos | (Scotland) Galen Chung | (England) Olav Bjortomt (United States) Shane Whitlock | not awarded (tie for silver) |
| 2024 | (Spain) Fuengirola | (United States) Victoria Groce | (Belgium) Tom Trogh (Croatia) Neven Trgovec | not awarded (tie for silver) |
| 2025 | (Italy) Caserta | Not included in the program | | |
| 2026 | (Bosnia and Herzegovina) Sarajevo | Not included in the program | | |
