= Mark Bytheway =

British quizzer

Medal record

Quizzing

Representing England

IQA British Championships
Silver medal – second place	2005 Altrincham	Singles
Silver medal – second place	2006 Shrewsbury	Singles
Bronze medal – third place	2008 Staveley	Singles
Silver medal – second place	2008 Staveley	Pairs
Gold medal – first place	2009 Derby	Singles

IQA World Championships
Bronze medal – third place	2007 Irthlingborough	Singles
Gold medal – first place	2008 Staveley	Singles
Bronze medal – third place	2009 Ludlow	Singles

IQA European Championships
Silver medal – second place	2006 Paris	Singles
Silver medal – second place	2006 Paris	Pairs
Gold medal – first place	2006 Paris	Club
Gold medal – first place	2007 Blackpool	Team
Bronze medal – third place	2008 Oslo	Pairs
Silver medal – second place	2008 Oslo	Team
Gold medal – first place	2009 Dordrecht	Team
Bronze medal – third place	2009 Dordrecht	Pairs

Mark Bytheway (22 July 1963 – 9 July 2010) was an England International Quiz player best known for becoming Quizzing World Champion in 2008 and winning the Top Brain competition of Brain of Britain.

== Brain of Britain ==
In 2007 he won Brain of Britain and in 2008 won the 3-year competition Brain of Brains beating TV's Egghead Chris Hughes and rival Pat Gibson and 9-year competition Top Brain titles, succeeding Kevin Ashman as holder.

== National and International Titles ==
In 2008 he won the prestigious title of Quizzing World Champion. He has been capped six times for the National team (with five wins) and has a current European/World ranking of number 3, behind Kevin Ashman (his pairs partner) and Pat Gibson. In 2009 he was third in the World Quizzing Championships and won the British title for the first time. He was unable to attend the 2010 World Quizzing Championships due to serious illness.

Bytheway was one of the original British Quizzing Grandmasters (as created under the Order of Merit maintained by Quizzing.co.uk) and has the third largest haul of international medals, with 16, (5 gold, 6 silver and 5 Bronze) after Ashman (27) and Gibson (24).

== Domestic Competition ==
In domestic competitions he played with the Milhous Warriors, the first British team to win the Club competition at the European Quizzing Championships, which comprises Ashman, captain and England international Tim Westcott, Welsh international Sean O'Neill, Eric Kilby, Keith Andrew and Brian Wilkins.

He several times appeared as an aspiring contestant on Who Wants to Be a Millionaire? but never qualified for the hot seat.

Bytheway died on 9 July 2010 after having esophageal cancer. As he was the reigning British Quiz Champion at the time of his death, the British Quizzing Championship trophy has been named in his honour, and will now be called the Mark Bytheway Trophy – a.k.a. the 'M*BY'.

== 2008 Interview ==
A 2008 interview, after winning the World title, is available on the Norwegian Quiz Association website.
