= Anurag Kashyap (contestant) =

American contestant

- Born: November 23, 1991 (age 34); Muzaffarpur, India
- Education: Rancho Bernardo High School, Massachusetts Institute of Technology
- Occupations: Software engineer, quiz contestant
- Known for: Winner of Scripps National Spelling Bee (2005), Jeopardy! Teen Tournament (2008)
- Awards: Scripps National Spelling Bee champion (2005); Jeopardy! Teen Tournament champion (2008)

Anurag Kashyap (born November 23, 1991) was the winner of the 2005 Scripps National Spelling Bee. He also won the Jeopardy! Teen Tournament in 2008.

== Biography ==
Kashyap was born in Muzaffarpur, India and raised in Poway, California. He entered his first spelling bee for Poway Unified School District when he was in the fourth grade at Valley Elementary School and continued competing as a student at Meadowbrook Middle School. In 2004, Kashyap placed 47th in the national spelling bee.

In the 19th round of the 2005 Scripps National Spelling Bee, 13-year-old eighth-grader Kashyap successfully spelled the word appoggiatura, which is defined as "a note of embellishment preceding another note and taking a portion of its time." He won about $28,000 in cash and prizes, most of which Kashyap saved towards college.

In 2008, Kashyap competed in the 25th season of the Jeopardy! Teen Tournament. At the end of the 10-day tournament, Kashyap defeated Bradley Silverman from Georgia and Audrey Hosford from Maryland to become only the second student to win the Scripps National Spelling Bee and the Teen Tournament (the first was 1992 Spelling Bee and 1996 Teen Tournament champion Amanda Goad).

In 2010, Kashyap graduated from Rancho Bernardo High School in San Diego, California, and had also studied at the Salk Institute in La Jolla, California, first as a summer intern with Inder Verma doing stem cell research two years prior. Kashyap enrolled at MIT with intentions to study biological sciences, graduated with a Bachelor's in 2015, and got his Master of Engineering the following year.

Kashyap returned to competitive quizzing in adulthood and won the Mimir's Well Carnation championship in May 2022. He also won the 2025 International Quizzing Championships pairs event with Canadian Adam Hancock. Kashyap then led his team, Wednesdays, to victory at the 2026 Trivia Nationals Quiz Bowl event.

== See also ==
- List of Scripps National Spelling Bee champions

Preceded by David Scott Pilarski Tidmarsh	Scripps National Spelling Bee winner 2005	Succeeded by Katharine Close
Preceded by Rachel Horn	Jeopardy! Teen Tournament winner 2008	Succeeded by Rachel Rothenberg
