= Holger Waldenberger =

German professional quiz player (born 1967)

Medal record

European Quizzing Championships
Silver medal – second place	2011 Bruges	Club
Gold medal – first place	2012 Tartu	Singles
Silver medal – second place	2012 Tartu	Club
Bronze medal – third place	2012 Tartu	Pairs
Bronze medal – third place	2014 Bucharest	Club
Bronze medal – third place	2015 Rotterdam	Club
Gold medal – first place	2017 Zagreb	Club
Silver medal – second place	2018 Venice	Club

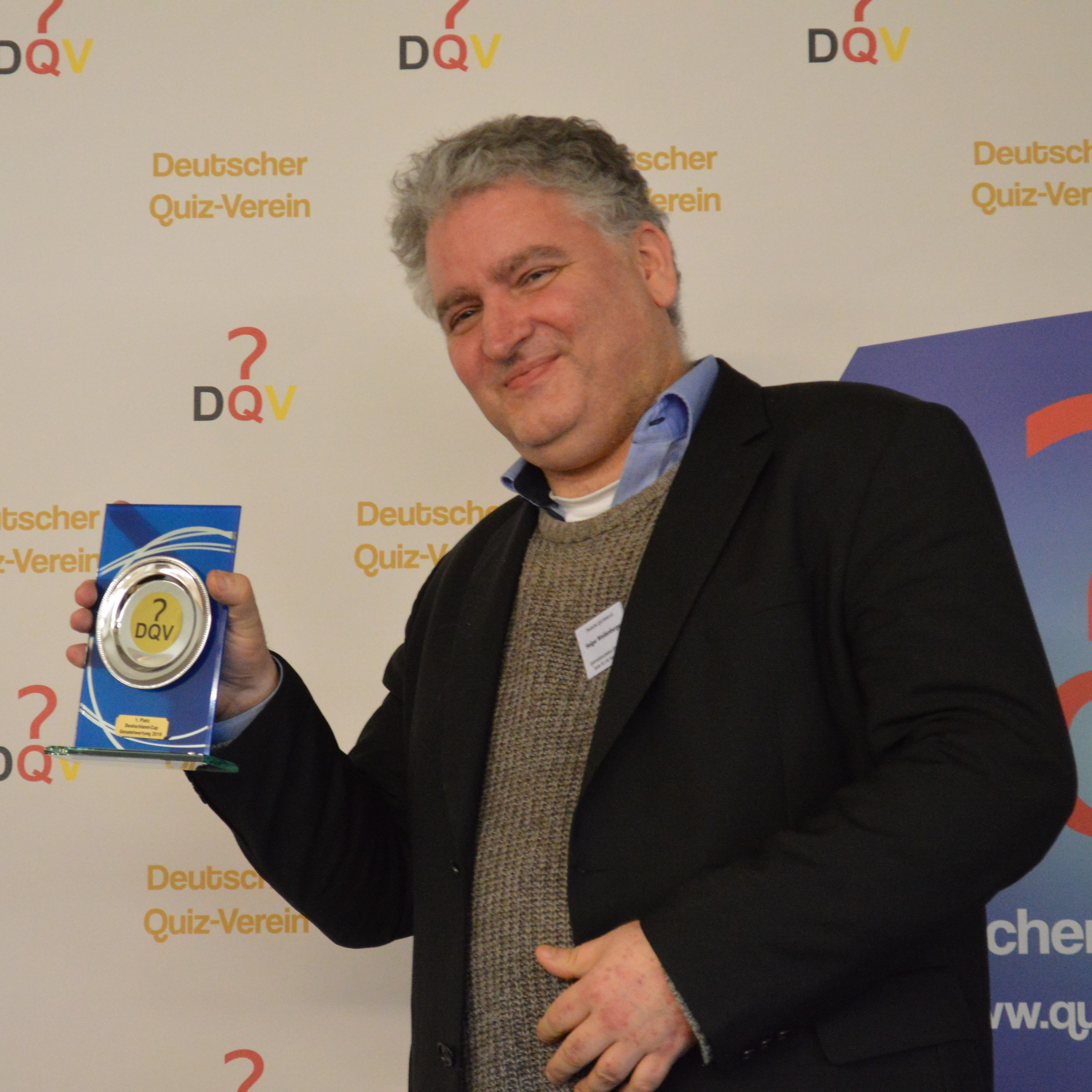

Holger Waldenberger (born 7 December 1967) is a German professional quiz player. He won the individual title in the European Quizzing Championships in 2012.

Waldenberger was born at Bielefeld, Germany. He has been the best German quizzer at the World Quizzing Championship four times between 2009 and 2012. In 2012, he placed 13th worldwide, in 2011 he was 22nd and 2010 he was 24th. In 2011 he became the first German to win an IQA medal when his club Europalia, made up of members from four countries, won Silver in Bruges.

In July 2012 he got his first television-appearance as "Chaser" (German: Jäger) in the NDR-Show Gefragt – Gejagt for all the first six episodes of the German remake of the British quiz show The Chase, then he re-appeared in the ARD version of the show from May 2015 to April 2017. In November 2012 Waldenberger became the first German EQC-Individuals-Champion in Tartu (Estonia). Besides this unexpected success he finished third in the pairs-discipline with Dorjana Širola and second in the team competition with Europalia. In 2021, he retired from quizzing.
