= Sebastian Klussmann =

German quiz player

Klussmann at the 2020 German Quizzing Championships

Sebastian Klussmann (born 24 April 1989 in Berlin) is a German quiz player best known for his role as a "chaser" in the ARD quiz show Gefragt – Gejagt (the German version of The Chase), in which he has appeared since 2013.

== Biography ==
Since 2011, Klussmann has been the founding chairman of the German Quizzing Association (Deutscher Quiz-Verein). He won the Berlin Quizzing Championship eight times in a row from 2011 to 2018. For many years, he was one of the five best "Juniors" worldwide, i.e., quizzers under 30 years of age and is the German record national player at the European Quizzing Championships. At the 2017 European Quizzing Championships in Zagreb, he was the second German to win a medal in an international quiz competition. The following year, he became European Champion with his team "Sage Supercilia". In all his participations in the World Quizzing Championship, he was among the best five Germans and became best German in 2014, 2022 and 2023. In 2015, he won the overall annual ranking of the Germany Cup and finished second in 2013, 2014, 2016, 2017 and 2018 respectively. He won the German Quizzing Championship in 2013, 2017, 2020 and 2022 in the double competition (each with Sebastian Jacoby) and in 2019, 2020, 2021, 2022 and 2023 in the team competition (each with Sebastian Jacoby, Roland Knauff and René Waßmer).

Since 2013, Klussmann has appeared regularly in the role of a "chaser" in the ARD quiz programme Gefragt – Gejagt, the German adaptation of the British game show The Chase, with the programme being broadcast from 2012 to 2015 on NDR and from 2015 on Das Erste. Klussmann plays several duels against one or more contestants, each of whom has a starting advantage. His nickname is Der Besserwisser (The Know-it-all).

Klussmann lives in Berlin and works as a consultant with a focus on memory, education, general knowledge and geopolitics as well as a speaker and presenter. He is also the author of TV quizzes and live quizzes.
