= Dorjana Širola =

Croatian quizzer

Medal record

Quizzing

European Quizzing Championships
Silver medal – second place	2011 Bruges	Club
Silver medal – second place	2012 Tartu	Club
Bronze medal – third place	2012 Tartu	Pair
Bronze medal – third place	2014 Bucharest	Club
Bronze medal – third place	2015 Rotterdam	Club
Gold medal – first place	2017 Zagreb	Club
Silver medal – second place	2018 Venice	Club

Dorjana Širola (born 9 June 1972) is a Croatian quizzer, linguist, anglicist and software tester. She has been the highest placed woman at the World Quizzing Championship from 2005 to 2011, and again from 2013 to 2018 (losing out in 2012 to Anne Hegerty), with seven overall top 20 finishes during this period.

She was also the winner of the BBC University Challenge (UC) quiz in 2002 as a member of the University of Oxford, Somerville College team and the winner of the University Challenge: The Professionals (UCP) quiz in 2006 as a member of the Bodleian Library team. She is the only person to have won both UC and UCP and the only person who has won University Challenge twice on two different teams. She also appeared on the BBC series Only Connect with a team called the 'Junipers'.

At the European Quizzing Championships she has won Gold (2017), three Silvers (2011, 2012, 2018) and two Bronzes (2014, 2015) with her club "Europalia" (Derk de Graaf (Belgium/Netherlands), Thomas Kolåsæter (Norway), Holger Waldenberger (Germany)), as well as a Bronze in Pairs with Holger Waldenberger (2012). Since 2015 she has captained the Croatian national quizzing team.

She obtained her B.A. in General Linguistics and English Language and Literature from the University of Zagreb in 1996; her M.Phil. in English and Applied Linguistics from the University of Cambridge, Trinity Hall in 1998; her D.Phil. in Comparative Philology and General Linguistics from the University of Oxford, Somerville College in 2005; and her MSc in computer science from the University of Kent in 2016.

Her area of research covers writing systems, writing-phonology interface; historical linguistics, comparative linguistics, Restsprachen and language variation. Having worked for a decade as a lecturer at the University of Rijeka in Rijeka, Croatia, she moved to the United Kingdom and left academia for a career in IT. She lives in Canterbury.
