= Ronny Swiggers =

Belgian quizzer

Medal record

Quizzing

Representing Belgium

World Championships
| Silver medal – second place | 2008 | Singles |
| Silver medal – second place | 2009 | Singles |
| Bronze medal – third place | 2010 | Singles |
| Gold medal – first place | 2021 | Singles |
| Gold medal – first place | 2023 | Singles |
| Bronze medal – third place | 2024 | Singles |
| Bronze medal – third place | 2025 | Singles |

European Championships
| Silver medal – second place | 2007 Blackpool | National Team |
| Silver medal – second place | 2007 Blackpool | Pairs |
| Gold medal – first place | 2008 Oslo | National Team |
| Gold medal – first place | 2008 Oslo | Pairs |
| Silver medal – second place | 2009 Dordrecht | National Team |
| Silver medal – second place | 2010 Derby | National Team |
| Bronze medal – third place | 2011 Bruges | National Team |
| Bronze medal – third place | 2012 Tartu | National Team |
| Bronze medal – third place | 2012 Tartu | Club |
| Gold medal – first place | 2013 Liverpool | Singles |
| Silver medal – second place | 2013 Liverpool | National Team |
| Bronze medal – third place | 2014 Bucharest | Singles |
| Gold medal – first place | 2014 Bucharest | Pairs |
| Silver medal – second place | 2014 Bucharest | National Team |
| Silver medal – second place | 2015 Rotterdam | Singles |
| Silver medal – second place | 2015 Rotterdam | National Team |
| Silver medal – second place | 2016 Athens | National Team |
| Gold medal – first place | 2016 Athens | Club |
| Silver medal – second place | 2017 Zagreb | National Team |
| Bronze medal – third place | 2018 Venice | Singles |
| Gold medal – first place | 2018 Venice | Pairs |
| Silver medal – second place | 2018 Venice | National Team |
| Silver medal – second place | 2019 Sofia | National Team |
| Silver medal – second place | 2021 Kraków | Singles |
| Gold medal – first place | 2021 Kraków | Pairs |
| Gold medal – first place | 2021 Kraków | National Team |
| Gold medal – first place | 2022 Berlin | Singles |
| Silver medal – second place | 2022 Berlin | Pairs |
| Gold medal – first place | 2022 Berlin | National Team |
| Silver medal – second place | 2023 Torremolinos | National Team |
| Silver medal – second place | 2024 Fuengirola | Singles |
| Silver medal – second place | 2024 Fuengirola | National Team |

Ronny Swiggers (born 1961 in Mechelen, Belgium) is one of Belgium's most successful quiz players. In November 2013, he became European Quizzing Champion, winning the individual competition at the European Championship in Liverpool, beating compatriot Nico Pattyn and Englishman Jesse Honey.

Swiggers won the World Quizzing Championships twice, in 2021 and 2023. He also came in 2nd place on two occasions in the World Quizzing Championships, being edged by Mark Bytheway in 2008 and by superstar Kevin Ashman in 2009.

Since 2007, he is a member of the Belgian national team. In 2008, he won the European title with the Belgian national team during the European Championships in Oslo. On that occasion, he also won the pairs competition together with Albert November. He is a six time Flemish champion (2005, 2006, 2007, 2009, 2010, 2013). He has strong local competition in former European Champion Nico Pattyn.
