= Nico Pattyn =

Belgian quizzer (born 1968)

Medal record

Quizzing

Representing Belgium

World Championships
| Bronze medal – third place | 2005 | Singles |
| Bronze medal – third place | 2006 | Singles |

European Championships
| Gold medal – first place | 2003 Bromley | Club |
| Silver medal – second place | 2004 Ghent | Singles |
| Silver medal – second place | 2004 Ghent | National Team |
| Gold medal – first place | 2005 Tallinn | National Team |
| Bronze medal – third place | 2005 Tallinn | Pairs |
| Gold medal – first place | 2006 Paris | National Team |
| Gold medal – first place | 2007 Blackpool | Singles |
| Silver medal – second place | 2007 Blackpool | National Team |
| Bronze medal – third place | 2007 Blackpool | Club |
| Gold medal – first place | 2008 Oslo | National Team |
| Silver medal – second place | 2009 Dordrecht | National Team |
| Silver medal – second place | 2010 Derby | National Team |
| Bronze medal – third place | 2011 Bruges | National Team |
| Bronze medal – third place | 2012 Tartu | National Team |
| Gold medal – first place | 2013 Liverpool | Masters |
| Silver medal – second place | 2013 Liverpool | Singles |
| Silver medal – second place | 2013 Liverpool | National Team |
| Silver medal – second place | 2014 Bucharest | National Team |
| Silver medal – second place | 2015 Rotterdam | National Team |
| Silver medal – second place | 2016 Athens | National Team |
| Gold medal – first place | 2016 Athens | Club |
| Silver medal – second place | 2017 Zagreb | National Team |
| Silver medal – second place | 2018 Venice | National Team |
| Silver medal – second place | 2019 Sofia | National Team |
| Silver medal – second place | 2021 Kraków | Pairs |
| Gold medal – first place | 2021 Kraków | National Team |
| Gold medal – first place | 2022 Berlin | National Team |
| Silver medal – second place | 2023 Torremolinos | National Team |
| Silver medal – second place | 2024 Fuengirola | National Team |

Nico Pattyn (born on 26 October 1968, in Roeselare, Belgium) is one of Belgium's most successful quiz players. He became European Quizzing Champion in November 2007, claiming the title in Blackpool. He was the first to beat English quiz legend, Kevin Ashman at the European championships individuals. He also won an individual silver medal at the first European Quizzing Championships in 2004 in his hometown Ghent and in 2013 in Liverpool, behind his compatriot Ronny Swiggers.

In 2005 and 2006, Pattyn came in 3rd place on two occasions in the World Quizzing Championships. He has placed in the top twenty of the World Championships on every occasion. Since 2007, countryman Ronny Swiggers has placed even higher than Pattyn ending 2nd in both 2008 and 2009 and 3rd in 2010.

He has captained the Belgian national team since 2003 when his team won the "England-Belgium interland" in Bromley, the precursor of the EQC. Pattyn has won three European titles in 2005, 2006 and 2008 and silver or bronze in all the seven other competitions with the national site. With his club "Café Den Hemel" he won the club competition in 2003, which was part of the "England-Belgium interland", and a European bronze medal in 2007. Together with his Café Den Hemel teammate Paul Arts, he also won bronze in the European pairs competition in 2005. In 2013, he also won the first edition of the Masters competition in a final against Pat Gibson. He was Flemish champion in 2008, 2011 and 2012.

His strongest subjects are history, geography and culture.

Pattyn was raised in Langemark but now lives in Ghent. He works as a psychologist.

== 2008 Interview ==
An interview with Nico Pattyn is available on the Norwegian Quiz Association website
