= Quiz =

Game of answering questions

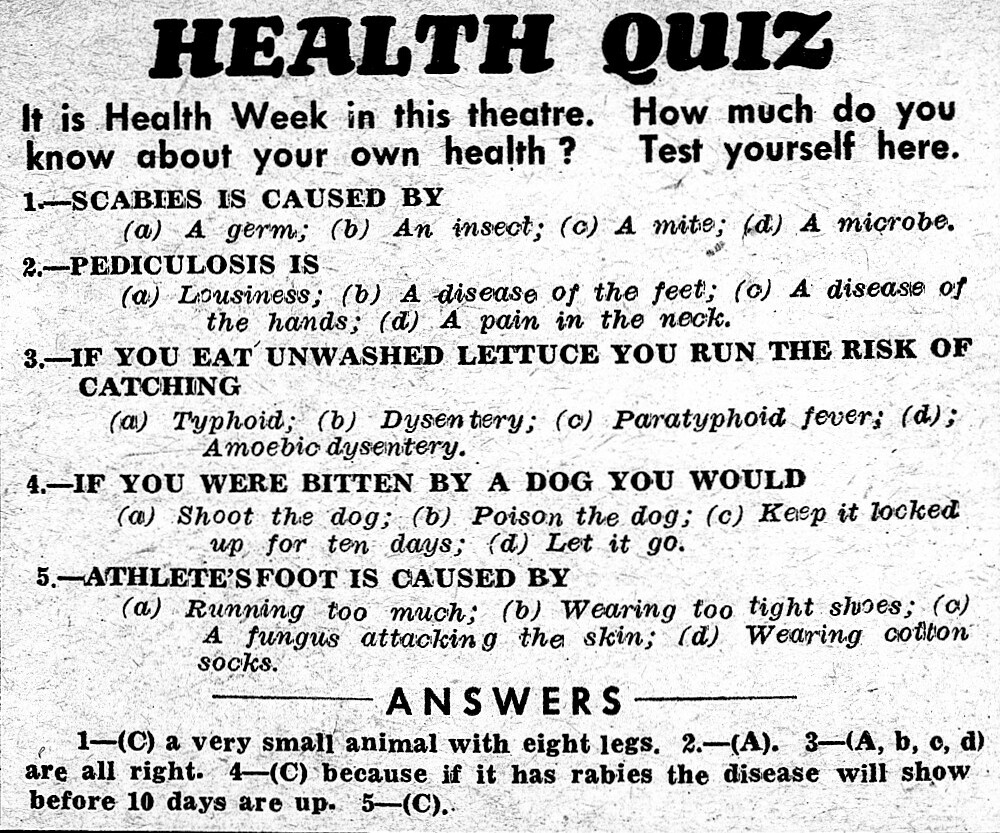
A printed quiz on health issues

A quiz is a form of mind sport in which people attempt to answer questions correctly on one or several topics. Quizzes can be used as a brief assessment in education and similar fields to measure growth in knowledge, abilities, and skills, or simply as a hobby. They can also be televised for entertainment purposes, often in a game show format.

== Etymology ==
The earliest known examples of the word date back to 1780; its etymology is unknown, but it may have originated in student slang. It initially meant an "odd, eccentric person" (Note: The now-disused word "quiz", which also referred to an "odd person" and has a likewise obscure origin, dates back from about the same time.) or a "joke, hoax". Later (perhaps by association with words such as "inquisitive"), it came to mean "to observe, study intently", and thence (from about the mid-19th century) "test, exam".

There is a well-known myth about the word quiz that says that in 1791, a Dublin theatre owner named Richard Daly made a bet that he could introduce a word into the language within 24 hours. He then went out and hired a group of street children to write the word "quiz", which was a nonsense word, on walls around the city of Dublin. Within a day, the word was common currency and had acquired a meaning (since no one knew what it meant, everyone thought it was some sort of test), and Daly had some extra cash in his pocket. However, there is no evidence to support the story, and the term was already in use before the alleged bet in 1791.

== As competitions ==
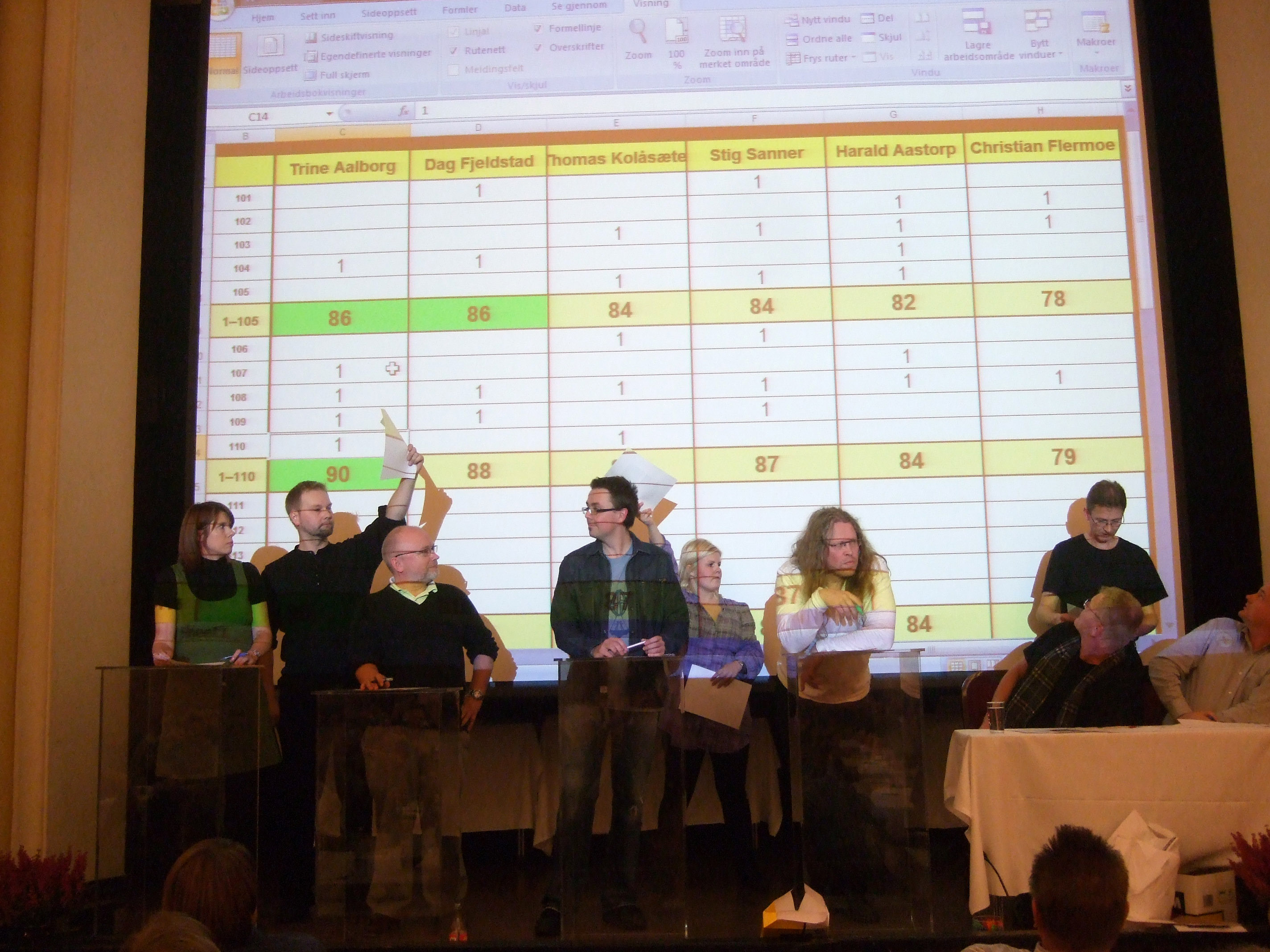
Final from Norwegian Quiz Championship, 2009

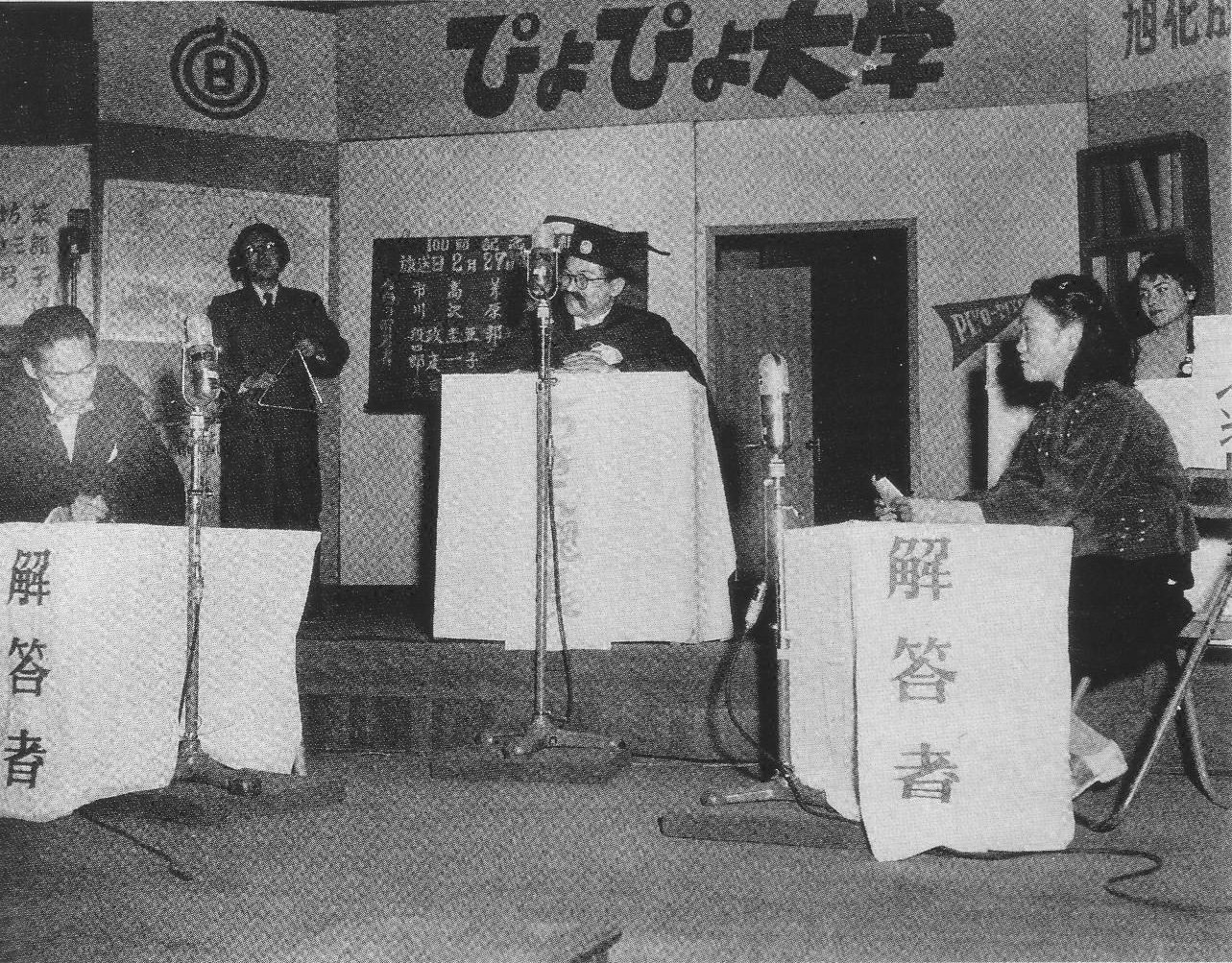
A quiz show in Japan, 1954

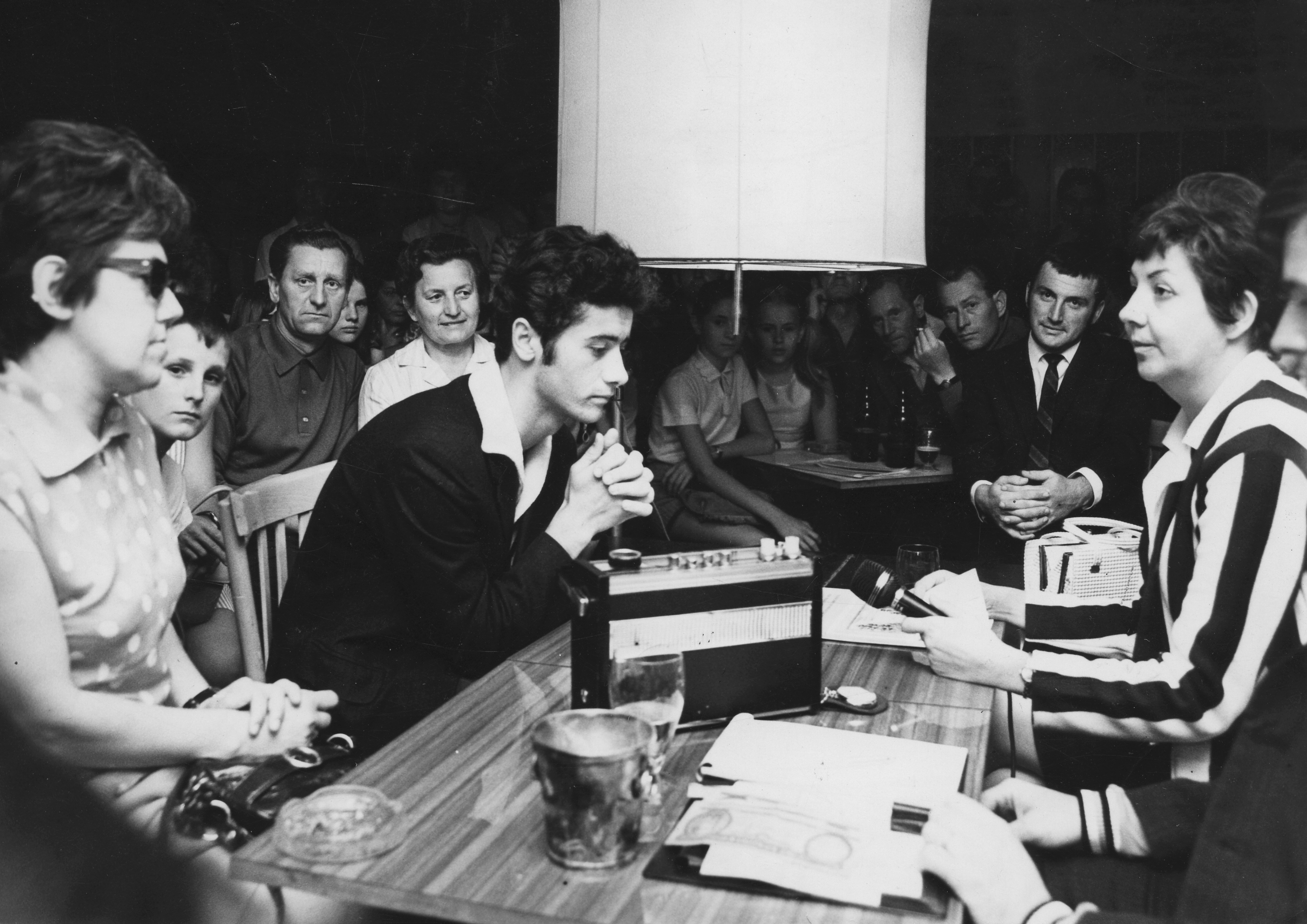
People listening to a Hungarian radio quiz, 1962

Quizzes may be held on a variety of subjects (general knowledge or "pot luck", which could be anything) or subject-specific. The format of the quiz can also vary. Popularly known competition quizzes include

- Pub quizzes
- Quiz bowl
- In Canada:
  - Reach for the Top
- In Lithuania:
  - Protmušis
- In the United Kingdom:
  - British Quizzing Championships, annual national tournament in Great Britain
  - Schools' Challenge
  - University Challenge (televised)
- In the United States:
  - Academic Competition Federation
  - College Bowl
  - National Academic Quiz Tournaments
  - Partnership for Academic Competition Excellence
- Individual quiz tournaments
  - In multiple countries:
    - International Quizzing Championships
    - World Quizzing Championships
  - In the United Kingdom:
    - Mastermind (televised)
  - Bait Bazi poetic quiz in Pakistan
- Board games:
  - Bezzerwizzer
  - Trivial Pursuit
- TV quizzes, also called quiz shows (game shows TV/radio)
  - Bait Bazi poetic quiz
  - Bamboozle!, a teletext quiz on UK TV
  - BBC's MasterMind
  - Jeopardy!
  - Quiz Call phone-in television show
  - The Weakest Link
  - Who Wants to Be a Millionaire?

See also:

- Quiz league
- Quiz machine

== World record ==
The largest quiz, according to the Guinness Book of World Records, took place in Maihar, India on June 18, 2017. 4,900 people took part. The previous record was held by a quiz held in Anand on January 11, 2016. Then, 3,832 people took part. Even earlier, on December 11, 2010, the "Quiz for Life", held at the Flanders Expo Halls in Ghent, Belgium, on 11 December 2010 with 2,280 participants. The winning team Café De Kastaar from Leuven consisted of Marnix Baes, Erik Derycke, Eric Hemelaers, Bart Permentier and Tom Trogh.

== In education ==
In an educational context, a quiz is usually a form of a student assessment, but often has fewer questions of less difficulty and requires less time for completion than a test. This use is typically found in the United States, Canada, the Philippines, Dominican Republic and some colleges in India. For instance, in a mathematics classroom, a quiz may check comprehension of a type of mathematical exercise. Some instructors schedule a daily or weekly quiz ranging from five to thirty relatively easy questions for the purpose of having the students review their previous lessons before attending the next class. A "pop quiz" is a quiz that students are given no time to prepare for; they are simply surprised with it in class.

== Other quizzes ==
Additionally, a personality quiz may be a series of multiple-choice questions about the respondent without right or wrong answers. The responses to these questions are tallied according to a key, and the result purports to reveal some quality of the respondent. This kind of "quiz" was originally popularized by women's magazines such as Cosmopolitan. They have since become common on the Internet, where the result page typically includes code which can be added to a blog entry to publicize the result. These postings are common on many sites like LiveJournal.

The results of online quizzes are generally to be taken lightly, as they do not often reflect the true personality or relationship. They are also rarely psychometrically valid. However, they may occasion reflection on the subject of the quiz and provide a springboard for a person to explore their emotions, beliefs, actions or to put some already acquired knowledge to the test.

== See also ==
- Test (assessment)
- List of quiz arcade games
