= 2009 European Mixed Curling Championship =

- Host city: Prague, Czech Republic
- Arena: Curling Hall Roztyly
- Dates: September 26–October 3, 2009
- Winner: Scotland
- Curling club: Curl Aberdeen, Aberdeen
- Skip: Tom Brewster
- Third: Lynn Cameron
- Second: Colin Campbell
- Lead: Michelle Silvera
- Alternate: Kim Brewster
- Finalist: Denmark (Joel Ostrowski)

The 2009 European Mixed Curling Championship was held from September 26 to October 3, 2009 at the Curling Hall Roztyly in Prague.

Scotland, skipped by Tom Brewster won its second title, defeating Denmark in the final.

== Teams ==
The teams are as follows:

Country	Skip	Third	Second	Lead	Alternate(s)
Austria	Karina Toth	Andreas Unterberger	Jacqueline Greiner	Florian Huber	
Belarus	Dimitry Kirillov	Ekaterina Kirillova	Dzmitry Yarko	Ewgeniya Orlis	Anna Alexandrovich
Czech Republic	Jakub Bares	Lenka Kitzbergerova	Jindrich Kitzberger	Michaela Nadherova	Jirí Snítil, Lenka Kucerova
Denmark	Joel Ostrowski	Camilla Jensen	Søren Jensen	Mona Sylvest Nielsen	
England	Alan MacDougall	Lana Watson	Andrew Reed	Suzie Law	John Sharp
Estonia	Erkki Lill	Maile Mölder	Harri Lill	Maarja Koll	Küllike Ustav, Toomas Lill
Finland	Jussi Uusipaavalniemi	Jaana Hämäläinen	Paavo Kuosmanen	Kirsi Kaski	
France	Lionel Roux	Helène Grieshaber	Xavier Bibollet	Marion Renaud	Alain Contat, Emma Ferrari
Germany	Rainer Schöpp	Andrea Schöpp	Sebastian Jacoby	Melanie Robillard	Monika Wagner
Hungary	Gabor Ezsöl	Orsolya Rokusfalvy	András Rokusfalvy	Csilla Halasz	Zsofi Riesz-Rokusfalvy, Dávid Huszlicska
Ireland	John Kenny	Marie O'Kane	Tony Tierney	Gillian Drury	
Italy	Lucrezia Salvai	Gianandrea Gallinatto	Veronica Gerbi	Diego Bertoletti	Valentina Cal, Giovanni Battoni
Latvia	Kārlis Smilga	Ieva Stauere	Jānis Klīve	Vineta Smilga	Maija Prozoroviča, Roberts Krusts
Lithuania	Virginija Paulauskaitė	Piotras Gerasimovicius	Giedre Vilcinskaite	Paulius Rymeikis	
Netherlands	Laurens Van Der Windt	Christel Krösing	Luutze Koelewijn	Rosemarie Berghuijs	Margrietha Voskuilen
Norway	Stein Erik Johansen	Aina Engen	Elvind Sve	Lene Vollan	
Poland	Rymwid Blaszczak	Magdalena Szyszko	Tomasz Kierzkowski	Magdalena Muskus	Magdalena Jagielska, Arkadiusz Detyniecki
Russia	Yana Nekrasova	Roman Kutuzov	Daria Kozlova	Alexander Kozyrev	Victor Kornev, Alexandra Saitova
Scotland	Tom Brewster	Lynn Cameron	Colin Campbell	Michelle Silvera	Kim Brewster
Serbia	Marko Stojanovic	Oliver Momcilovic	Bojan Mijatovic	Dara Gravara-Stojanovic	
Slovakia	Milan Kajan	Gabriela Kajanova	Rene Petko	Barbora Vojtusova	Martina Kajanova
Spain	Antonio De Mollinedo Gonzalez	Ellen Kittelsen	José Manuel Sangüesa Anzano	Ana Arce	Irene Santiago Calvillo
Sweden	Jonatan Nerdal	Matilda Rodin	Lennart Karlsson	Anna Ahlbäck	
Switzerland	Daniel Lüthi	Brigitte Portmann	Martin Oberholzer	Karin Lüthi	Pascal Hess, Nicole Strausak

== Standings ==
Group A	W	L
Denmark	7	0
Germany	6	1
Spain	4	3
Switzerland	4	3
Latvia	3	4
Slovakia	3	4
Poland	1	6
Lithuania	0	7

Group B	W	L
Scotland	6	1
Czech Republic	6	1
Finland	5	2
Hungary	4	3
France	3	4
Estonia	3	4
Netherlands	1	6
Belarus	0	7

Group C	W	L
England	7	0
Russia	6	1
Sweden	5	2
Austria	4	3
Ireland	3	4
Italy	2	5
Norway	1	6
Serbia	0	7

=== Playoffs ===
Semi final challenge games:

- Czech Republic 5-3 Russia
- Czech Republic 7-2 Germany

Semifinals
A1	Denmark	4
C1	England	2
B1	Scotland	4
B2	Czech Republic	2

Final
A1	Denmark	1
B1	Scotland	5
Bronze Medal Game
B2	Czech Republic	3
C1	England	5

2009 European Mixed Curling Championship
(Scotland)
Scotland
2nd title
