= Thomas J. Kinne =

German writer and television personality

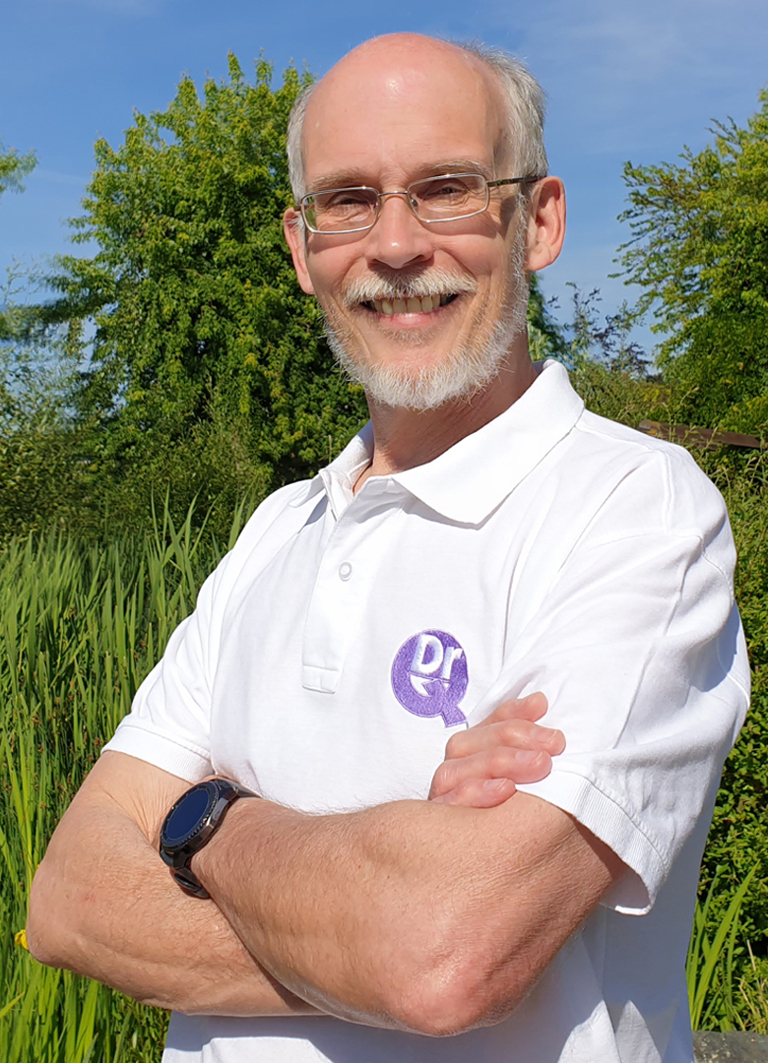
- Born: Thomas Kinne; February 26, 1961 (age 65); Niederbieber-Segendorf, Rhineland-Palatinate, Germany
- Education: America studies, film, journalism
- Alma mater: Johannes Gutenberg University of Mainz, San Francisco State University
- Occupations: translator, author
- Known for: numerous game-show appearances as contestant, 1st German Jeopardy! champion, and chaser on the German version of The Chase
- Height: 6 ft 1 in (1.85 m)
- Title: Doctor of Philosophy
- Website: https://www.teejaykay.de/en

Thomas J. Kinne (born 26 February 1961 in Niederbieber-Segendorf, today part of Neuwied, Germany) is a German translator, author, editor, proofreader, travel writer, movie expert, and comic-book collector. He became widely known in his home country for his frequent appearances as a contestant and winner on a wide variety of game shows on German and U.S. television. Since 2018, he is one of the “chasers” on Gefragt – Gejagt, the German version of the U.K. game show The Chase.

== Early life ==
After graduating from Werner-Heisenberg-Gymnasium in Neuwied and completing his mandatory service in the German Bundeswehr, Kinne studied at University of Mainz in Germany and spent a year at San Francisco State University in California. During this time, he started freelancing as a script translator for various German television producers and networks. His work included dubbing scripts for American TV series such as Cheers and Hill Street Blues, but he also translated German entertainment programs as well as historic and scientific documentaries into English for broadcast outside of Germany. He has since established his own translation service and translates mostly books on film and comics. He also writes travel literature and collects comic books.

== Achievements and awards ==
Kinne graduated magna cum laude in 1994 with a thesis on elements of Jewish tradition in the works of Woody Allen, placing current films and television series in a wider cultural and literary context that dates back as far as the Bible.
Books and television productions which he was involved in as a translator received numerous national and international awards. Among others, the ZDF documentary, The Drama of Dresden, was honored in 2006 with an International Emmy Award in the “Best Documentary” category; the documentary, Göring: A Career received the Gold World Medal at the 2007 International TV Programming and Promotion Awards in New York; and 75 Years of DC Comics was presented with a Will Eisner Award in 2011.

== Television ==
=== 1990s ===
Kinne had his first television appearance on June 11, 1991 in an episode of Riskant!, the first German version of the U.S. game show, Jeopardy!. In the same year, he taped an appearance on Tic Tac Toe, the German version of Tic-Tac-Dough, where he won the maximum of three episodes and left as undefeated champion. When Jeopardy! was re-launched in Germany in 1994 under its original title and a copy of the original set, Kinne was one of the three contestants in the premiere episode, hosted by Frank Elstner. Kinne won this and the following four episodes of the game, becoming both Germanyʼs first ever and first five-time undefeated Jeopardy! champion. One year later, he appeared on the first German Jeopardy! Tournament of Champions, where he was narrowly defeated in the semifinals in an unprecedented multiple tie-breaker. Nonetheless, being fluent in English, Kinne was invited to represent his home country in 1996 in the first international Jeopardy! tournament in the United States (as Tom Kinne). A few months later, back in Germany, Kinne reached the final round on Jeder gegen jeden, the German version of Fifteen to One.

=== 2000s ===
Kinne returned to television in 2001 on the German version of The Weakest Link, in which he beat all eight of his opponents and emerged as the winner. A short while later, he appeared on the German version of 1 vs. 100. He was the sole contestant left in the “Mob” to become the “One,” but was subsequently defeated.

=== 2010s ===
After a prolonged abstinence from television, Kinne came back in 2015 as one of the four contestants on episode 27 of season 1 of Gefragt – Gejagt, the German version of The Chase. In the Cash Builder round, he answered 12 questions correctly, setting a new record for the German show, and in the Final Chase, he and two other contestants beat “chaser” Sebastian Jacoby for a total haul of €37,500. A year later, Kinne was the winner among four contestants in episode 11 of season 22 of the quiz show hessenquiz, which focuses on trivia about the state of Hesse, following in the footsteps of his daughter, Alisa, who had won an installment one year earlier. Two months after the program had aired, Kinne appeared on episode 25 of Der Quiz-Champion, in which contestants have to win five consecutive “duels” against celebrity experts in various fields (in this case: film and television, sports, literature, geography, and history). In the final, he defeated another contestant and took home the grand prize of €100,000 as the eleventh “quiz champion” in the history of the show.
In season 7 of the game show, Kinne joined the ranks of the chasers on Gefragt – Gejagt under the name of “Quizdoktor.” He also appeared in a similar role on the game show Jackpot-Jäger als one of the “masters” against whom the three contestants have to play in order to capture the show’s jackpot.

=== 2020s ===
After celebrity appearances on Quizduell (a show based on the popular Swedish app, Quizkampen) in 2020 and 2023, and Wer weiß denn sowas? in 2021 and 2022 Kinne returned to TV quiz shows as a contestant on Gipfel der Quizgiganten (“Summit of the Quiz Giants”) in 2022, where he was a co-winner in the premiere episode, which aired on German RTL on 10 January 2022. On Klein gegen Gross – Das unglaubliche Duell, he returned to Das Erste in a Eurovision show on 19 February 2022, where he faced a young contestant in a “River Duel,” in which both had to identify rivers from around the world just by the shape of their course. On 20 September 2022, he appeared with his daughter Alisa on Doppelt kocht besser, a cooking contest based on the French show Chéri(e), c’est moi le chef !, internationally known as My Wife Rules, on Sat.1.
