= Klaus Otto Nagorsnik =

German quiz player (1955–2024)

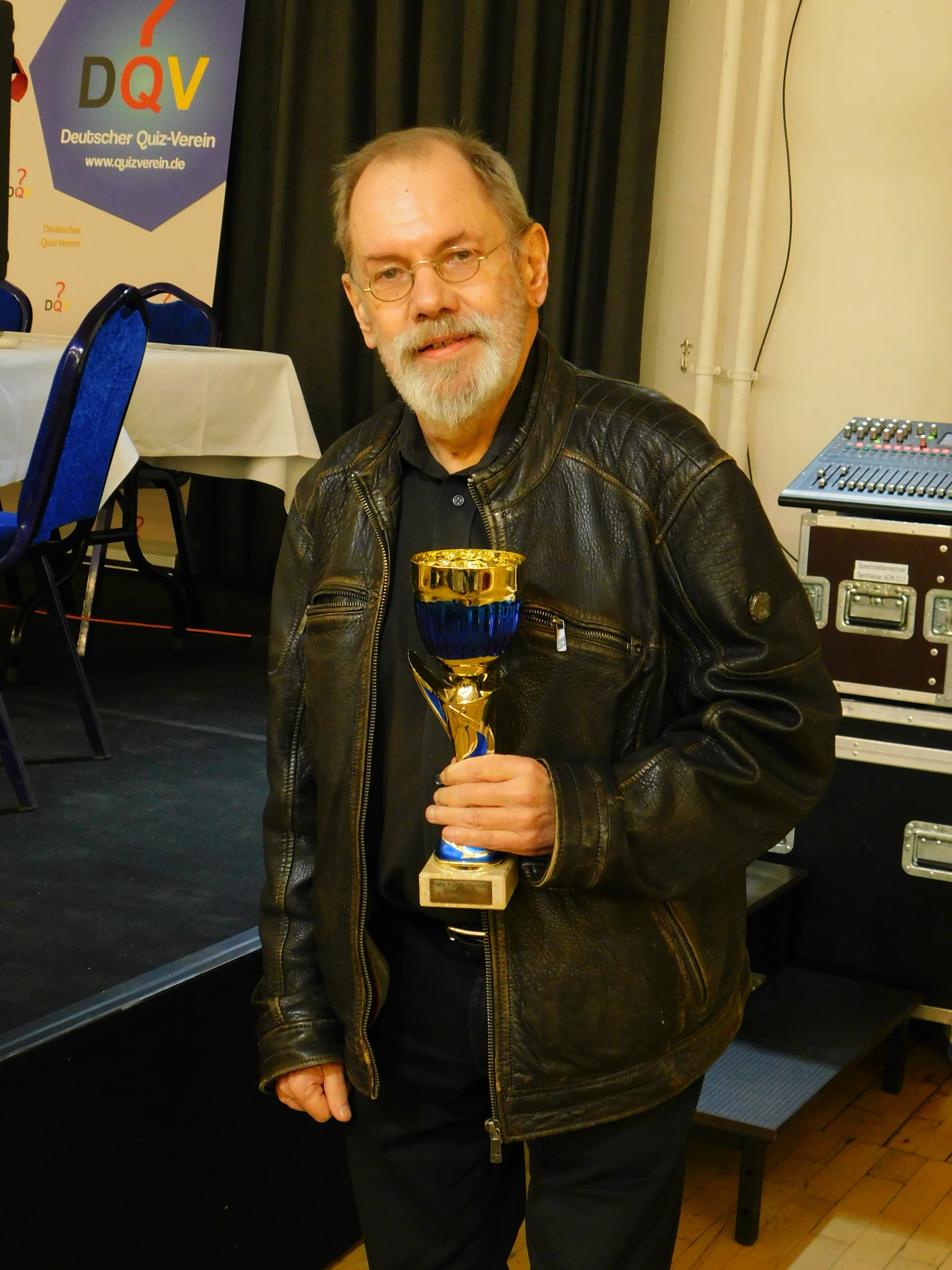
- Nagorsnik at the German Quizzing Championships in February 2024
- Born: July 29, 1955; Billerbeck, North Rhine-Westphalia, West Germany
- Died: April 22, 2024 (aged 68)
- Other names: Der Bibliothekar (The Librarian)
- Occupations: Quizzer; television personality
- Years active: 2014–2024

Klaus Otto Nagorsnik (29 July 1955 – 22 April 2024) was a German quiz player and librarian. From 2013 he was a member of the German Quizzing Association (Deutscher Quiz-Verein, founded in 2011) and participated in several national and international competitions. He was known to German television audiences through his regular appearances as one of the "chasers" on the quiz show Gefragt – Gejagt, the German adaptation of The Chase.

== Biography ==
Nagorsnik was born in Billerbeck on 29 July 1955. A child of a working-class family, he had five younger siblings. At the Gymnasium Nepomucenum in Coesfeld he graduated from high school and then studied History and Ethnology in Berlin. He broke off his studies after eight semesters and instead learned the profession of a bookseller at Coppenrath & Boeser in Münster. Nagorsnik was a librarian at the city library at Münster from 1983 to 2021. He was in charge of the mobile library there from 1984 to 1997. Nagorsnik died in Münster on 22 April 2024, at the age of 68.

== Quiz achievements ==
Klaus Otto Nagorsnik
Medal record

World Quizzing Championships
Silver medal – second place	2012 Duisburg	Single (second-best German participant)

Nagorsnik won the monthly Germany Cup (German: Deutschland-Cup) four times from 2013 to 2015. As a single player or together with a partner, he took part in the annual German Quizzing Championship with varying successes, winning the doubles tournament (with Carsten Happe) in 2014. On a regional level, he won the individual competition at the North Rhine-Westphalian Quizzing Championships in 2015 and 2022. He was the organizer of a monthly pub quiz taking place in various bars in the city of Münster and worked on the questions.

== Chaser ==
As a chaser at Gefragt – Gejagt, the German adaptation of The Chase, Klaus Otto Nagorsnik bore the battle name "Der Bibliothekar“ (English: The Librarian). His distinguishing features were a well-groomed beard and wearing bow ties with the jacket. He had been on the show regularly since 2014 and had 105 appearances (as of the end of March 2020). He was able to win 69 of his appearances, around 66 percent. In the remaining 34 percent, Nagorsnik's opposing team won an average of €5,456 per appearance, which was rather at the lower end of the profit potential compared to the other chasers.

For every appearance in the quiz show, he received a fee from the television station; the sums he offered to the quiz participants are coordinated with the management of the television station within a span, i.e. Nagorsnik did not have to pay anything out of pocket.
