= 2008 European Mixed Curling Championship =

- Host city: Kitzbühel, Austria
- Arena: Mercedes Benz Sportpark
- Dates: September 22–27, 2008
- Winner: Germany
- Curling club: SC Riessersee, Garmisch-Partenkirchen
- Skip: Rainer Schöpp
- Third: Andrea Schöpp
- Second: Sebastian Jacoby
- Lead: Melanie Robillard
- Alternate: Helmar Erlewein, Monika Wagner
- Coach: John Robillard
- Finalist: Czech Republic (Jiří Snítil)

The 2008 European Mixed Curling Championship was held from September 22 to 27, 2008 at the Mercedes Benz Sportpark in Kitzbühel, Austria.

Germany, skipped by Rainer Schöpp, won their first title after defeating Czech Republic in the final.

== Teams ==
Hosts Austria were skipped by two-time Austrian mixed curling champion Markus Schagerl. Germany were skipped by Rainer Schöpp and defending champions Wales were skipped by Adrian Meikle.

Teams
Country	Skip	Third	Second	Lead	Alternate(s)	Coach	Curling club
Austria	Markus Schagerl	Verena Hagenbuchner	Rainer M.M. Ammer	Jasmin Seidl	Armin Kvas, Karin Trauner		CC Traun
Czech Republic	Jirí Snítil	Hana Synácková	Martin Snítil	Karolína Pilařová	Katerina Kobosilova, Sune Frederiksen		
Denmark	Joel Ostrowski	Camilla Jensen	Søren Jensen	Jeanne Ellegaard			Tårnby CC
England	Alan MacDougall	Lana Watson	John Sharp	Suzie Law			
Estonia	Andres Jakobson	Reet Taidre	Konstantin Dotsenko	Küllike Ustav	Marcella Tammes, Leo Jakobson		
Finland	Jussi Uusipaavalniemi	Jaana Hämäläinen	Paavo Kuosmanen	Kirsi Kaski	Minna Uusipaavalniemi		Hyvinkää CC
France	Lionel Roux	Helène Grieshaber	Xavier Bibollet	Candice Santacru	Alain Contat, Marion Renaud		
Germany	Rainer Schöpp	Andrea Schöpp	Sebastian Jacoby	Melanie Robillard	Helmar Erlewein, Monika Wagner	John Robillard	SC Riessersee, Garmisch-Partenkirchen
Hungary	György Nagy	Ildiko Szekeres	Zsombor Rokusfalvy	Boglarka Adam			
Ireland	Johnjo Kenny	Marie O'Kane	Tony Tierney	Gillian Drury			
Italy	Antonio Menardi	Giorgia Apollonio	Fabio Alverà	Claudia Alverà	Massimo Antonelli, Lucrezia Salvai		CC Tofane, Cortina d'Ampezzo
Latvia	Iveta Staša-Šaršūne	Robert Krusts	Janis Klive	Una Grava-Germane		Brian Gray	CC Jelgava
Netherlands	Margrietha Voskuilen	Jaap Veerman	Esther Romijn	Erik Dijkstra			CC Utrecht
Norway	Joakim Skogvold	André Alfsen	Gina Grøseth	Eli Moen Skaslien			Oppdal CC
Poland	Marta Szeliga-Frynia	Pawel Frynia	Marianna Das	Arkadiusz Detyniecki	Katarzyna Wicik, Tomasz Korolko	Pawel Burlewicz	
Russia	Alexander Kirikov	Yana Nekrasova	Petr Dron	Galina Arsenkina	Victor Kornev, Anna Sidorova		Moskvitch CC, Moscow
Scotland	Alan Smith	Gillian Howard	David Mundell	Karen Strang			
Serbia	Darko Sovran	Radmila Panzalovic	Bojan Mijatovic	Olivera Momcilovic	Miodrag Kastratovic, Dara Gravara-Stojanovic		
Slovakia	Rene Petko	Gabriela Kajanova	Milan Kajan	Jana Janickova			
Spain	José Luis Hinojosa de Torres-Peralta	Martina Zurlohe	José Maria Rivera Cadierno	Leticia Hinojosa de Torres	Ana Arce, Sergio De Miguel		
Sweden	Niklas Edin	Anna Hasselborg	Eric Carlsén	Sabina Kraupp			Karlstads CK
Switzerland	Christian Moser	Niki Goridis	Stefan Luder	Michèle Moser	Esther Neuenschwander, Oliver Wininger		Dübendorf CC
Wales	Adrian Meikle	Lesley Carol	Andrew Tanner	Irene Murray	Chris Wells		Deeside CC

== Round robin ==
The winner of each group advanced directly to play-offs and second place contested the qualification round.

=== Group A ===
Group A consisted of the Czech Republic, France, Latvia, Scotland, Slovakia, Switzerland and defending champions Wales.

Wales, the defending champions, were eliminated at the first hurdle, losing five of their six group matches. The group was won by the Czech Rublic who won all six of their matches. A tie-breaker was required for second after Scotland and Switzerland were tied on four wins and two losses each.

Group A
Place	Team	1	2	3	4	5	6	7	Wins	Losses
1	Czech Republic	*	6:5	5:4	9:4	8:4	6:3	7:5	6	0
2	Scotland	5:6	*	6:7	10:2	9:1	7:3	9:4	4	2
3	Switzerland	4:5	7:6	*	8:6	5:9	8:4	10:3	4	2
4	Latvia	4:9	2:10	6:8	*	5:4	6:4	6:4	3	3
5	France	4:8	1:9	9:5	4:5	*	4:5	14:1	2	4
6	Slovakia	3:6	3:7	4:8	4:6	5:4	*	5:7	1	5
7	Wales	5:7	4:9	3:10	4:6	1:14	7:5	*	1	5

Team to play-offs
Teams to tie-break for 2nd place

==== Tie-break ====
Scotland defeated Switzerland 4–3 in the tie-break.

Team	1	2	3	4	5	6	7	8	Final
Switzerland	1	0	1	0	0	0	0	1	3
Scotland	0	1	0	1	1	0	1	0	4

=== Group B ===
Group B consisted of Denmark, England, Estonia, Hungary, the Netherlands, Russia, Serbia and Spain.

Russia finished first in the group after winning all seven of their matches. Denmark were second with a record of six wins and one loss.

Group B
Place	Team	1	2	3	4	5	6	7	8	Wins	Losses
1	Russia	*	11:3	8:5	7:5	12:2	8:2	7:5	13:2	7	0
2	Denmark	3:11	*	6:4	7:6	7:2	8:4	12:2	14:2	6	1
3	Hungary	5:8	4:6	*	8:3	7:2	7:3	11:5	13:1	5	2
4	England	5:7	6:7	3:8	*	10:4	7:2	14:0	13:1	4	3
5	Spain	5:7	2:12	5:11	0:14	3:4	7:4	*	16:4	2	5
6	Estonia	2:12	2:7	2:7	4:10	*	3:5	4:3	14:2	2	5
7	Netherlands	2:8	4:8	3:7	2:7	5:3	*	4:7	8:2	2	5
8	Serbia	2:13	2:14	1:13	1:13	2:14	2:8	4:16	*	0	7

Team to play-offs
Teams to qualification round

=== Group C ===
Group C consisted of hosts Austria, Finland, Germany, Ireland, Italy, Poland, Norway and Sweden.

Sweden finished first in the group after winning all seven of their matches. Germany were second with a record of five wins and two losses.

Group C
Place	Team	1	2	3	4	5	6	7	8	Wins	Losses
1	Sweden	*	8:5	7:6	5:2	8:1	6:5	5:2	6:4	7	0
2	Germany	5:8	*	5:4	7:6	8:9	8:3	5:1	11:2	5	2
3	Finland	6:7	4:5	*	6:5	8:5	6:8	7:6	6:4	4	3
4	Italy	2:5	6:7	5:6	*	7:3	8:5	5:4	7:2	4	3
5	Austria	1:8	9:8	5:8	3:7	*	9:4	10:5	8:5	4	3
6	Ireland	5:6	3:8	8:6	5:8	4:9	*	6:5	3:8	2	5
7	Poland	2:5	1:5	6:7	4:5	5:10	5:6	*	5:4	1	6
8	Norway	4:6	2:11	4:6	2:7	5:8	8:3	4:5	*	1	6

Team to play-offs
Teams to qualification round

== Qualification round ==
Germany defeated Denmark 12–8 in the qualification semi-final to advance to the qualification final. They then defeated Scotland 6–3 to advance to the play-offs.

Qualification semi-final
B-2	Germany	12
C-2	Denmark	8

Qualification final
A-2	Scotland	3
Germany	6

Qualification semi-final

Sheet F	1	2	3	4	5	6	7	8	Final
Germany	0	3	0	2	0	4	3	X	12
Denmark	4	0	3	0	1	0	0	X	8

Qualification final

Sheet A	1	2	3	4	5	6	7	8	Final
Scotland	0	1	0	0	0	0	2	0	3
Germany	2	0	1	0	1	1	0	1	6

== Play-offs ==
In the semi-finals, the Czech Republic and Germany advanced to the final after an 8–3 win over Russia and a 7–1 win over Sweden respectively. Sweden won bronze after a 6–4 win over Russia in the bronze medal game and Germany won the title with a 5–3 win over the Czech Republic in the final.

Semi-finals
B1	Russia	3
A1	Czech Republic	8
C2	Germany	7
C1	Sweden	1

Final
Czech Republic	3
Germany	5
Bronze Medal Game
Russia	4
Sweden	6

Semifinals

Sheet C	1	2	3	4	5	6	7	8	Final
Russia	0	2	0	1	0	0	0	0	3
Czech Republic	3	0	1	0	3	1	0	0	8

Sheet E	1	2	3	4	5	6	7	8	Final
Germany	0	3	1	1	1	1	X	X	7
Sweden	1	0	0	0	0	0	X	X	1

Bronze medal game

Sheet B	1	2	3	4	5	6	7	8	Final
Russia	0	0	1	0	0	2	1	0	4
Sweden	2	0	0	0	3	0	0	1	6

Final

Sheet D	1	2	3	4	5	6	7	8	Final
Germany	0	0	2	0	1	1	0	1	5
Czech Republic	0	1	0	1	0	0	1	0	3

== Final standings ==
Final standings
Place	Team	Games	Wins	Losses
1st place, gold medalist(s)	Germany	11	9	2
2nd place, silver medalist(s)	Czech Republic	8	7	1
3rd place, bronze medalist(s)	Sweden	9	8	1
4	Russia	9	7	2
5	Scotland	8	5	3
6	Denmark	8	6	2
7	Switzerland	7	4	3
8	Hungary	7	5	2
9	Italy	7	4	3
10	England	7	4	3
11	Finland	7	4	3
12	Latvia	6	3	3
13	Spain	7	2	5
14	France	6	2	4
15	Austria	7	4	3
16	Ireland	7	2	5
17	Estonia	7	2	5
18	Wales	6	1	5
19	Poland	7	1	6
20	Slovakia	6	1	5
21	Netherlands	7	2	5
22	Norway	7	1	6
23	Serbia	7	0	7
