= Gefragt – Gejagt =

German quiz show

Gefragt – Gejagt

Gefragt – Gejagt (Asked—Chased) is a quiz show that has been broadcast on German television since 2012 (on NDR Fernsehen from 2012 to 2015 and on Das Erste from 2015 onward). It's also been broadcast on ORF 1. It is the German adaptation of ITV's show The Chase.

== History ==
The editorial team of NDR discovered the original quiz program from 2009 and adapted it together with the set, the name of the program, the logo and the rules of the game. Sports reporter Alexander Bommes was selected as host, which he has hosted continuously since the programme’s start on 15 July 2012 NDR Fernsehen aired the first three seasons. From season 4 onwards, the show has been broadcast on Das Erste. As of November 2020, there were 9 seasons, totalling more than 500 regular episodes (plus several extra-long editions and specials).

== Rules ==
=== General ===
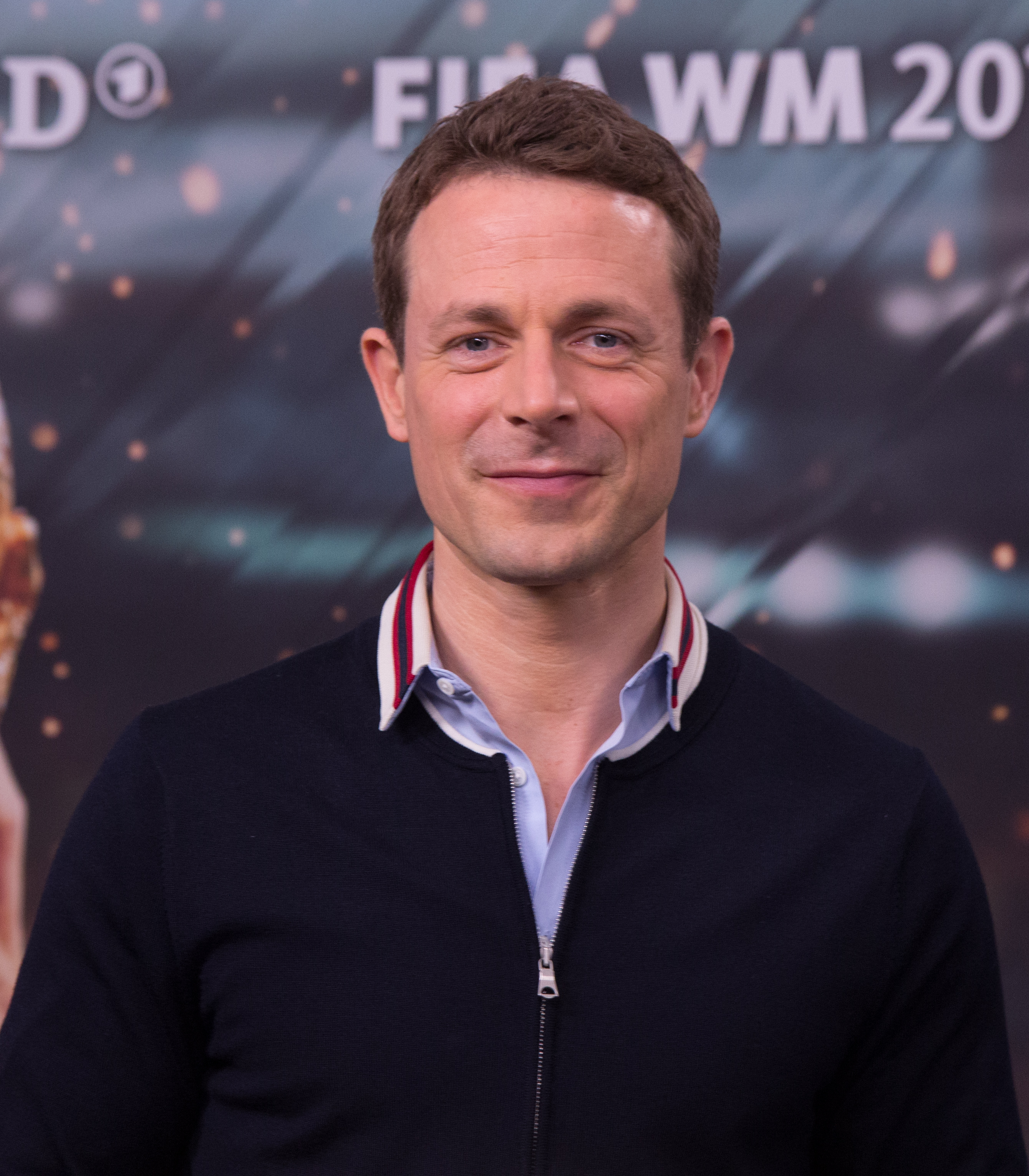
Alexander Bommes

German or German-speaking people aged 18 and over can apply to participate on the show. Before they can appear publicly in the television studio, they have to do a short casting. Four players form a team and are displayed at the gaming table with their first names. Before the start of the question and answer session, they introduce themselves in one sentence and formulate an announcement to the chaser.

The contestants' team plays against a professional quiz player, the Chaser (Jäger). As of 2020, the show's chasers are Sebastian Klussmann, Sebastian Jacoby, Klaus Otto Nagorsnik, Manuel Hobiger and Thomas Kinne. Each has been given a nickname or “battle name,” for example „Der Besserwisser“ (The Know-It-All) for Klussmann, or „Der Quizvulkan“ (The Quiz Volcano) for Hobiger. The chaser takes a seat on an elevated podium, in front of him is a back list game board with seven fields. The game starts on the top field, after which the answers obtained by the contestants are converted into a sum of money. In the case of successive answers, the game total moves down one field. If the quizzer makes a mistake and the chaser has given the correct answer, the distance between the opponents is reduced. This can lead to the premature departure of a contestant.

=== Cash-building round (Schnellraterunde) ===
Each contestant individually tries to accumulate money to the prize fund through two rounds. In the first round, the contestant has to try to answer as many general knowledge questions correctly within 60 seconds, with each correct answer worth €500.

=== Head-to-Head Round (Einzelduell gegen den Jäger) ===
The Chaser emerges and the second round, known as the Head-to-Head Round, begins. The contestant's winnings from the Cash Builder is placed on a seven-step board. They must attempt to bring the winnings into their bank by correctly answering multiple choice questions.

The contestant can decide from one of three places to begin:

- Three steps down from the top, giving a three-step head start from the Chaser and requiring five correct answers to win the amount earned in the first round
- Two steps from the top, giving a two-step head start and requiring six correct answers to win a higher amount than was earned in the first round
- Four steps from the top, giving a four-step head start and requiring just four correct answers to win a lower amount than what was earned in the first round

The higher and lower amounts are determined by the Chaser, and can be any amount of their choosing, even negative amounts or €0 for the lower offers.

Once a starting position (and offer) has been taken by the contestant, the host asks both contestant and chaser a question with three possible answers (A, B or C). Each person secretly locks in their respective answer on a keypad. Once a person locks in a guess, the other must do so within five seconds or they will be locked out from answering that question. A correct answer brings the contestant or the Chaser one step down the board, while an incorrect guess or lock out leaves them where they are.

If the contestant successfully reaches the bottom of the board without being caught, they advance to the final and their money is added to the prize fund (or deducted if the amount is negative). If they are caught at any point by the Chaser, the game ends, and the contestant is eliminated and the money earned is lost. If all four contestants are eliminated, then they nominate one person to play in the final.

=== Finale (Final Chase) ===
If none of the contestants has defended their play money, the TV editorial team will provide a finalist previously nominated by the team with a starting fee of 500 euros. If he finally wins the last round, the money will be withdrawn. But if he wins the higher sum, only 500 € are withdrawn. He thus wins the honor or probably some more euros.

The chaser is outside the studio in the first part of this final round. After all four contestants have completed their game against the chaser, the host will again read out any questions. There is one point for every correct answer. The total number of points is not limited, it depends on the one hand on the speed of the answers and on the other hand on the length of the read questions. The time limit for the contestants' team, which responds through buzzers, is two minutes. If no one can think of an answer, one of the team says "weiter" (go on) and buzzer while doing so, so that time can be used well. The team gets a point advantage according to the number of finalists.

The chaser must then, if possible, outbid the total number of points within two minutes with his answers. Then the imaginary sum earned by the team is gone. If the hunter makes mistakes or says ″stop″, the players remaining in the final round can briefly discuss the correct answer. If they succeed, they reset the chaser by one game point each. If the chaser does not achieve the number of points scored by the team, the contestants will actually win the displayed amount. They should have agreed in advance about the distribution, there is no editorial requirement.

The questions put to the players and the chaser are not identical, but they have been compiled by the editorial team from the same area of knowledge and with a roughly uniform level of difficulty. The participants select the closed questionnaire before the program begins.

== Statistics ==
Since the broadcast started (as of April 18, 2020), more than 1900 game participants have participated in the episodes. The highest amount of money actually earned was 168,000 euro, earned during a celebrity edition on 4 March 2017 against the chaser Holger Waldenberger. There have been over 500 episodes aired so far.

During the same period, nine different chasers started, six men and three women. The chasers were or are (in parentheses their times of participation):

- Holger Waldenberger („Der Gigant”/The Giant), 2012, 2015–2017
- Sebastian Jacoby („Der Quizgott”/The Quiz God), since 2013
- Sebastian Klussmann („Der Besserwisser”/The Know-it All), since 2013
- Klaus Otto Nagorsnik (†) („Der Bibliothekar”/The Librarian), 2014–2024
- Grażyna Werner („Die Gouvernante”/The Governess), 2017
- Manuel Hobiger („Der Quizvulkan”/The Quiz Volcano), since 2018
- Thomas Kinne („Der Quizdoktor”/The Quiz Doctor), since 2018
- Adriane Rickel („Die Generalistin”/The Generalist), since 2021
- Annegret Schenkel („Die Schlagfertige“/The Quick-Witted), since 2022

Werner, Hobiger, Kinne, and Schenkel all appeared as contestants on the show before their first appearances as a chaser.
