= Paul Paquet =

Paul Paquet may refer to:

- Paul C. Paquet (born 1948), American and Canadian biologist
- Paul Paquet (trivia writer) (born 1965), Canadian trivia writer

== See also ==
- Paul Parquet (1856–1916), French perfumer
