= Elizabeth Horrocks =

British writer

Elizabeth Horrocks (born 3 May 1946) is an author and winner of the BBC quiz series Mastermind.

== Biography ==
Horrocks attended Whitchurch Grammar School in Cardiff, a school also attended by fellow writer Andrew Davies. She then graduated from Bristol University in 1967, after which she went on to have a teaching career. Schools at which she taught include The Grove School, Market Drayton, Clayton Hall School in Newcastle Staffs, and Hyde Clarendon College in Hyde, Greater Manchester.

In 1974, Horrocks contested and won the BBC Mastermind programme, hosted by Magnus Magnusson with specialist subjects Shakespeare's plays, Works of J.R.R. Tolkien, Works of Dorothy L. Sayers. Subsequently, she took part in various Mastermind "Specials", most recently Mastermind Champion of Champions in 2010, answering questions on "Arthurian Legend", which has been a lifelong subject for her.

In 2014, she appeared in the TV game show Amazing Greys.

Horrocks is the author of the Arthurian Trilogy featuring the works The Edge of Doom, The Dark Space and The New Found Land. She has a new take on the Arthurian legend with the introduction of time travel mixed with the rural and quiet settings of Alderley Edge in Cheshire.
