= World Trivia Night =

Annual trivia competition in Ottawa

World Trivia Night is one of North America's largest live (Note: In this sense, "live" means people answering the same questions, read live in the same forum, as opposed to radio contests.) trivia contests, held annually in Ottawa, Ontario since 1995.

== History ==
Originally organized by the Kiwanis Club of Orleans (Ottawa), World Trivia Night is now organized by the Children's Aid Foundation (CAF) of Ottawa, which uses it to fund educational and life enrichment opportunities for children and youth who are supported by the Children's Aid Society of Ottawa. The 2024 event marked the 30th anniversary of World Trivia Night (counted from 1995 when it was taken over by CAF Ottawa).

== Format ==
Each year, roughly 1,000 people play in teams of up to 10 people. The event was originally held at the Aberdeen Pavilion, moving to the EY Centre in 2012, and then, after being held virtually in 2020 and 2021 during the pandemic, Rogers Centre Ottawa (formerly the Shaw Centre) starting in 2022.

Since 2002, the event has been hosted by Paul Paquet of the Trivia Hall of Fame and the Ottawa Trivia League. Paquet also writes the questions.

Many political and media luminaries have taken part in the event. Former mayor Jacquelin Holzman once served as a judge, and in 2003, Ken Jennings read the first question via videotape. By tradition, the first answer is always Pierre Trudeau, as a tip of the hat to the long-running radio trivia contest in Stevens Point, which always begins with a question about Robert Redford.

Since 2006, the winners have been awarded the Trong Nguyen Memorial Trophy, named after a member of wirecrats.com who died earlier that year.

== Winning teams ==
- 1995: The Data Banks
- 1996: The Bank Dicks
- 1997: Puzzles
- 1998: The Viagrins (later renamed the Smarts)
- 1999: Puzzles
- 2000: Random Access Memory
- 2001: La Triviata
- 2002: La Triviata
- 2003: Me and Nine Idiots (after a scoring adjustment, La Triviata shared the title)
- 2004: Wirecrats.com
- 2005: Shocked and Appalled
- 2006: Fran Mahovlich
- 2007: Shocked and Appalled
- 2008: La Triviata
- 2009: I Lost on Jeopardy
- 2010: Wirecrats.com
- 2011: Nerd Alert
- 2012: The Sticky Buns
- 2013: La Triviata
- 2014: Nerd Alert (although Mizar Flying Pintos was the top "champion" team)
- 2015: La Triviata
- 2016: I Lost on Jeopardy
- 2017: The Sticky Buns
- 2018: The Sticky Buns
- 2019: La Triviata
- 2020: La Triviata
- 2021: La Triviata
- 2022: Schrodinger's Cat Again
- 2023: Schrodinger's Cat Again
- 2024: Small Alternative Facts of Confederation (although Simple Minds were the top "champion" team)
- 2025: Trivia Troopers
