= Ana Arce =

Andorran photographer and curler

- Photographer; curler
- Born: Madrid

Team
- Skip: Ellen Kittelsen
- Third: Ana Arce
- Second: Leticia Hinojosa de Torres
- Lead: Irene Santiago Calvillo

Curling career
- World Championship: 0
- European Championship: 6 (2002, 2003, 2004, 2005, 2006, 2009)

Ana Arce (born 5 January 1964) is a photographer and former skip of the Andorran national women's curling team. She now plays on the Spanish national team.

== Photography ==
She produced the Ana Arce Team Sponsorship Calendar 2006 featuring nude or semi-nude photographs of women curlers from a variety of countries including Denmark, Italy, Spain, England, Poland, Germany and Canada. The curlers included Daniela Jentsch, Melanie Robillard, Lynsay Ryan, Kasia Selwand and Claudia Toth. She produced a second calendar for 2007 which included Christine Keshen, Linn Githmark, Debbie McCormick and Jackie Lockhart.

== Curling ==
Arce played in the 2002, 2003 and 2004 European Curling Championships for Andorra. Skipping the team, she placed 17th, 15th and 21st respectively. In 2005, she moved to the Spanish team. Her international debut for Spain was at the 2005 European Mixed Curling Championship playing lead for Antonio De Mollinedo Gonzalez. Spain finished 16th. Her debut for Spain at the 2005 European Championships happened a few months later. She played third for Ellen Kittelsen, and the team finished 17th.

In 2006, with the same skips, Arce placed 20th at the 2006 European Mixed and 17th at the European Championships. At the 2007 European Mixed, she placed 21st on De Mollinedo's team. She would not play at the European Championships again until 2009, finishing 19th on Kittelsen's rink. In the meantime she placed 13th at the 2008 European Mixed and 9th at the 2009 event respectively. In 2008, the team was skipped by José Luis Hinojosa de Torres-Peralta and she was the team's female alternate. The 2009 team was skipped by De Mollinedo again.
