= Asia-Pacific Quiz Championships =

International quizzing competition

- Sport: Trivia
- Founded: 2012; 14 years ago
- Countries: 6 Australia; India; Malaysia; New Zealand; Philippines; Singapore
- Most recent champion: Australia (3rd title)
- Most titles: India (4 titles)

The Asia-Pacific Quiz Championships (APQC) is the premier team quiz event in the Asia-Pacific region.

== History ==
The tournament began in 2012 as the ASEAN Quizzing Championships, an annual quiz competition held among quizzers from ASEAN, primarily those living in Malaysia, Singapore and the Philippines. In 2015 the competition expanded to include participants from India and a number of off-site chapters and became the Asian Quizzing Championships (AQC). After teams from the Asia-Pacific region such as Australia (from 2017) and New Zealand (from 2018) began participating, the event was renamed the Asia-Pacific Quiz Championships to reflect this wider geographical participation.

The event was founded by Caleb Liu from Singapore and Movin Miranda from India (and a long time resident of Malaysia) with the goal of fostering friendly competition and growing interest in quizzing in the region. The teams are selected by the National Quiz Associations of the respective member countries.

== Format ==
Teams of four compete in three separate rounds, with the highest cumulative score being crowned champions. The scoring format has changed slightly over the different editions. This system was used in 2024:

- Round 1 - Individual written round, modelled after the World Quizzing Championships. Participants answer 140 questions worth one point each, with 20 questions drawn from each of seven categories:
  - Culture / World
  - Entertainment
  - History / Geography
  - Literature / Language
  - Lifestyle / Business
  - Sciences
  - Sport and Games

The contribution to the overall team score is the cumulative total of the top three individual scores in each category (i.e. the lowest score for each category is dropped). For example, if the four members of a team score 15, 16, 17 and 7 for Sciences, the team score for Sciences will be 15+16+17=48. Maximum score = 420 points.

- Round 2 - Individual Response Round. Participants are asked questions individually in turn. They may answer themselves, or pass the question to a teammate. There is a maximum of three passes per player, once to each teammate. 40 questions worth a maximum of 5 points each. Maximum score = 200 points.
- Round 3 - Team Discussion Round. Participants work as a team to answer 50 questions worth a maximum of 10 points each. Maximum score = 500 points.

== Host City and Results ==
Edition	Year	Host city	Gold	Points	Silver	Points	Bronze	Points
XIII	2026	Da Nang	TBA	TBA	TBA	TBA	TBA	TBA
XII	2025	Manila	Australia Gold	590	Philippines	518	India	452
XI	2024	George Town	Australia Gold	605	Australia Green	556	Malaysia	553
X	2023	Colombo	India	461	Malaysia	431	Australia	396
IX	2022	Kota Kinabalu	India	704	Australia	657	Malaysia	595
VIII	2019	Singapore	Singapore	455	Australia	444	Malaysia	420
VII	2018	Kuala Lumpur	Australia	593	Malaysia	542	Singapore	469
VI	2017	Kuala Lumpur	India	607	Australia	534	Singapore	518
V	2016	Singapore	Malaysia	475	Singapore	474	Singapore B	341
IV	2015	Singapore	India	530	Singapore	519	Singapore B	491
III	2014	Manila	Singapore	437	Malaysia	396	Philippines	385
II	2013	Singapore	Singapore	414	Philippines	396	Malaysia	326
I	2012	Kuala Lumpur	Malaysia	310	Singapore	263	Philippines	216

The event was not contested in 2020 and 2021 due to the COVID-19 pandemic.

== Participating teams ==
Teams	Australia	India	Malaysia	New Zealand	Singapore	Philippines	International	TOTAL
2025	3	1	1	0	0	2	1	8
2024	3	1	2	0	1	1	1	9
2023	2	2	1	0	1	0	0	6
2022	2	1	4	0	1	1	0	9
2019	3	3	1	0	3	0	0	10
2018	2	1	3	1	1	1	0	9
2017	2	1	2	0	1	2	1	9
2016	0	0	1	0	3	1	1	6
2015	0	1	0	0	3	1	3	8
2014	0	0	1	0	1	2	0	4
2013	0	0	1	0	2	1	0	4
2012	0	0	2	0	1	1	0	4
TOTAL	17	11	19	1	18	13	7	86

== Medal summary ==
Nation	Gold	Silver	Bronze	Total
Singapore	3	3	4	10
India	4	0	1	5
Malaysia	2	3	4	9
Australia	3	4	1	8
Philippines	0	2	2	4

== Winning Teams ==
Year	Country	Team Members
2025	Australia	Ross Evans, Aniket Khasgiwale, Aaran Mohann, Rohan Williams
2024	Australia	Ross Evans, David Howse, Aniket Khasgiwale, Aaran Mohann
2023	India	Rajiv Rai, Pradeep Ramarathnam, Nikhil Sonde, Vinoo Sanjay
2022	India	Brajendu Bhaskar, Sania Narulkar, Rajiv Rai, Thejaswi Udupa
2019	Singapore	Ravikant Avva, Caleb Liu, Pradeep Ramarathnam, Mukund Sridhar
2018	Australia	Rick Bakker, Ross Evans, Michael Logue, Aaran Mohann
2017	India	Anustup Datta, Arun Hiregange, Rajiv Rai, Thejaswi Udupa
2016	Malaysia	G. Krishnamurti, Movin Miranda, Chong MinHow, Jaideep Mukherjee
2015	India	Gopal Kidao, Rajiv Rai, Jayakanthan R, Swaminathan Ganesh
2014	Singapore	Ravikant Avva, Jake Jacobs, Caleb Liu, Rohan Naidu
2013	Singapore	Caleb Liu, Jake Jacobs, Nirav Kanodra, Iain Carmichael
2012	Malaysia	Neil Bruce, Kee Choonlee, Shiva Gurupatham, Movin Miranda

== Highest Individual Scorers ==
While a team event, the APQC also acknowledges the highest scorers in the first (individual) round.

Year	Gold	Silver	Bronze
2025	(Australia) Rohan Williams	(Philippines) Jojo Torio	(Australia) Aaran Mohann
2024	(Australia) Aniket Khasgiwale	(Australia) Ross Evans and Aaran Mohann (tied)	n/a
2023	(India) Vinoo Sanjay	(India) Rajiv Rai	(Malaysia) Brandon Blackwell
2022	(Australia) Ross Evans	(Philippines) Jojo Torio	(India) Rajiv Rai, (India) Thejaswi Udupa (tied)
2019	(Malaysia) Movin Miranda	(Australia) Michael Logue, (Singapore) Pradeep Ramarathnam, (Singapore) Mukund Sridhar (tied)	n/a
2018	(Australia) Ross Evans	(New Zealand) Kelvin Lange	(Australia) Rick Bakker
2017	(India) Arun Hiregange	(India) Thejaswi Udupa	(Singapore) Ravi Avva
2016	(Malaysia) Movin Miranda	(Malaysia) G. Krishnamurti	(Singapore) Pradeep Ramanathan, (Singapore) Mukund Sridhar (tied)
2015	(Singapore) Rajesh Kannan	(Singapore) Sunny Chu	(Philippines) Leonardo Gapol
2014	(Malaysia) Movin Miranda	(Philippines) Leonardo Gapol	(Singapore) Caleb Liu
2013	(Philippines) Leonardo Gapol	(Malaysia) Movin Miranda	(Singapore) Caleb Liu
2012	(Malaysia) Movin Miranda	(Singapore) Caleb Liu	(Philippines) Leonardo Gapol

== Records ==
- Largest Winning Margins
  - India by 73 points (2017)
  - Australia by 72 points (2025)
  - Australia by 51 points (2018)
  - Australia by 49 points (2024)
  - Malaysia by 47 points (2012)
  - India by 47 points (2022)
- Narrowest Winning Margins
  - Malaysia by 1 point (2016)
  - Singapore by 11 points (2019)
  - India by 11 points (2015)
  - Singapore by 18 points (2013)

Results last updated: 7 December 2025

== See also ==
- World Quizzing Championships
- Quiz Olympiad
