= Tero Kalliolevo =

Finnish quizzer

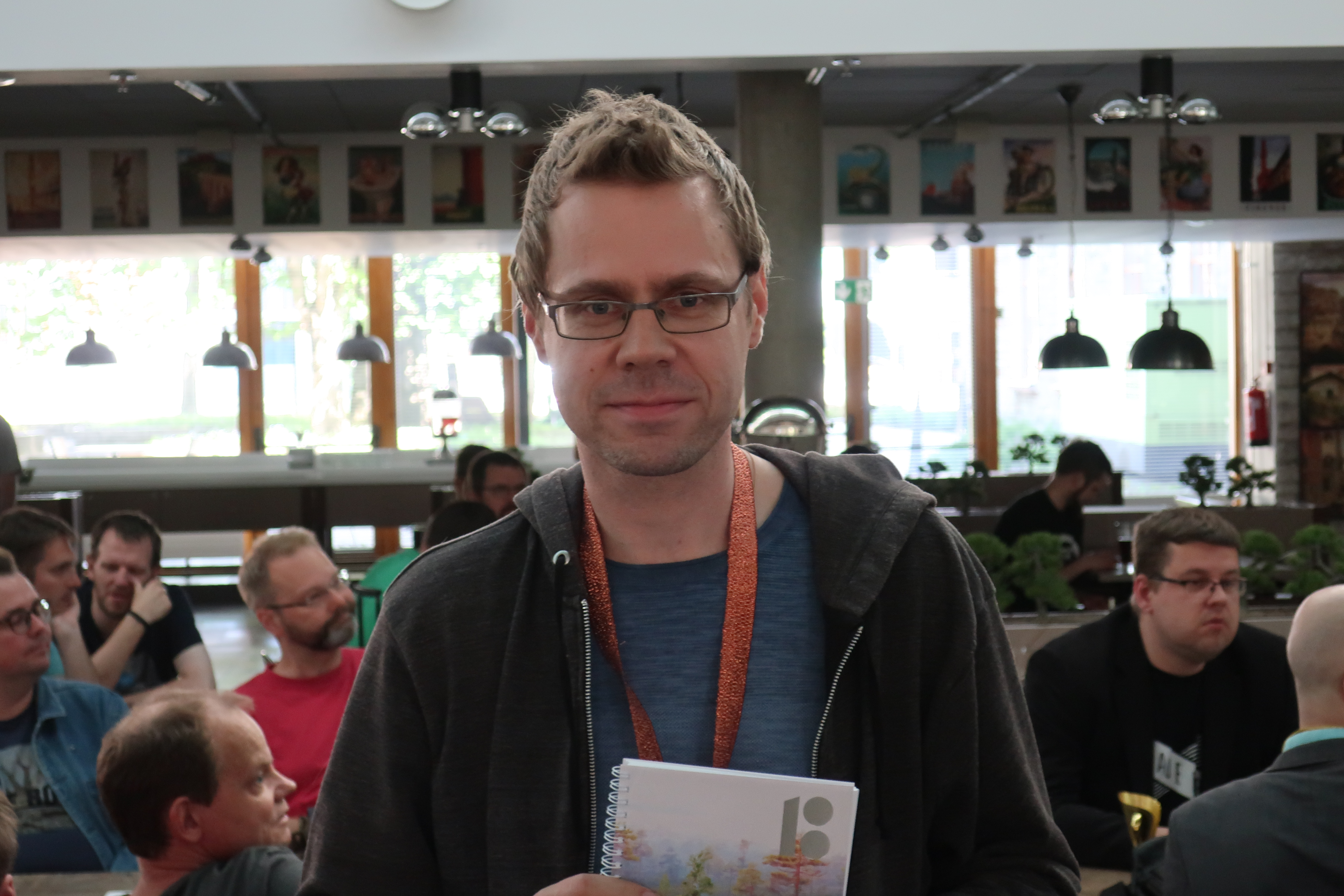
- Tero Kalliolevo at the 2018 Nordic Quizzing Championships

Medal record

Quizzing

Representing Finland

World Championships
Bronze medal – third place	2008	Singles
Bronze medal – third place	2011	Singles
Silver medal – second place	2013	Singles
Bronze medal – third place	2019	Singles
Bronze medal – third place	2021	Singles

European Championships
Silver medal – second place	2007 Blackpool	Pairs
Bronze medal – third place	2008 Oslo	National Team
Bronze medal – third place	2008 Oslo	Club
Silver medal – second place	2009 Dordrecht	Club
Silver medal – second place	2010 Derby	Singles
Silver medal – second place	2010 Derby	Pairs
Bronze medal – third place	2010 Derby	National Team
Gold medal – first place	2011 Bruges	National Team
Bronze medal – third place	2011 Bruges	Club
Gold medal – first place	2012 Tartu	Club
Silver medal – second place	2012 Tartu	Pairs
Silver medal – second place	2012 Tartu	National Team
Silver medal – second place	2013 Liverpool	Club
Bronze medal – third place	2013 Liverpool	Pairs
Bronze medal – third place	2014 Bucharest	Singles
Gold medal – first place	2014 Bucharest	Pairs
Silver medal – second place	2014 Bucharest	Club
Bronze medal – third place	2017 Zagreb	National Team
Silver medal – second place	2017 Zagreb	Club
Gold medal – first place	2018 Venice	Pairs
Bronze medal – third place	2019 Sofia	Singles
Bronze medal – third place	2021 Kraków	Singles
Gold medal – first place	2021 Kraków	Pairs
Gold medal – first place	2021 Kraków	Club
Silver medal – second place	2022 Berlin	Pairs
Bronze medal – third place	2022 Berlin	Club
Bronze medal – third place	2023 Torremolinos	Singles

Nordic Championships
Gold medal – first place	2008 Tallinn	Singles
Gold medal – first place	2008 Tallinn	Pairs
Gold medal – first place	2008 Tallinn	Team
Gold medal – first place	2010 Turku	Singles
Gold medal – first place	2010 Turku	Pairs
Gold medal – first place	2010 Turku	Team
Gold medal – first place	2012 Copenhagen	Singles
Gold medal – first place	2012 Copenhagen	Pairs
Bronze medal – third place	2015 Oslo	Singles
Gold medal – first place	2015 Oslo	Pairs
Bronze medal – third place	2015 Oslo	Team
Bronze medal – third place	2018 Tallinn	Singles
Bronze medal – third place	2018 Tallinn	Team

Tero Kalliolevo (born 7 March 1977) from Finland is the Nordic countries' most successful quiz player in international competitions.

In 2007 he won his first European Quizzing Championships medal in the pair competition with compatriot Jussi Suvanto behind Belgians Erik Derycke/Tom Trogh.

In 2008 he won a singles bronze medal at the World Quizzing Championships even edging out superstar Kevin Ashman. Only Mark Bytheway and Ronny Swiggers were better.

At the European Quizzing Championships 2008 in Norway he finished in 5th place (singles), even with Suvanto. Together they came in 4th in the doubles competition. With the club JFGI (Tero Kalliolevo, Jussi Suvanto, Estonians Ove Põder and Tauno Vahter) he edged out Ashman's Milhous Warriors for Bronze.

In 2009 he finished 7th at the World Quizzing Championships behind the British and Belgian world stars (Ashman, Bytheway, Swiggers, Olav Bjortomt, Nico Pattyn, Pat Gibson). At the Euros 2009 he also finished 7th at singles behind the same players save Ian Bayley instead of Bytheway, again 4th at doubles and second with the club.
