= Paavo Kuosmanen =

Finnish curler and curling coach

- Curler ♂
- Born: 14 October 1975 (age 51)

Team
- Curling club: Hyvinkää CC, Hyvinkää
- Skip: Kalle Kiiskinen
- Third: Teemu Salo
- Second: Leo Ouni
- Lead: Paavo Kuosmanen
- Alternate: Jermu Pöllänen

Curling career
- Member Association: Finland
- World Championship: 1 (2022)
- World Mixed Doubles Championship: 1 (2013)
- World Mixed Championship: 2 (2017, 2024)
- European Championship: 5 (2010, 2018, 2021, 2022, 2023)
- Other appearances: European Mixed Championship: 3 (2008, 2009, 2011), World Junior Championships: 2 (1995, 1997)
Medal record
Curling
Finnish Men's Championship
Gold medal – first place	2010
Gold medal – first place	2015
Gold medal – first place	2018
Gold medal – first place	2020
Silver medal – second place	2003
Silver medal – second place	2008
Silver medal – second place	2013
Silver medal – second place	2014
Silver medal – second place	2017
Silver medal – second place	2019
Bronze medal – third place	2005
Bronze medal – third place	2006

Paavo Kuosmanen (born 14 October 1975) is a Finnish curler and curling coach.

At the international level, he is a 1997 World junior silver medallist.

At the national level, he is a four-time Finnish men's champion curler and three-time Finnish mixed champion curler.

== Teams ==
Season	Skip	Third	Second	Lead	Alternate	Coach	Events
1994–95	Perttu Piilo	Teemu Salo	Kalle Kiiskinen	Paavo Kuosmanen	Riko Raunio		WJCC 1995 (9th)
1996–97	Perttu Piilo	Kalle Kiiskinen	Paavo Kuosmanen	Petri Manninen	Olli Orrainen		WJCC 1997 (silver)
2002–03	Perttu Piilo	Kalle Kiiskinen	Teemu Salo	Paavo Kuosmanen	Juha Pekaristo		FMCC 2003 (silver)
2004–05	Tuomas Vuori	Paavo Kuosmanen	Jari Rouvinen	Jani Sullanmaa	Tero Salo, Tommi Rouvinen		FMCC 2005 (bronze)
2005–06	Tuomas Vuori	Paavo Kuosmanen	Jari Rouvinen	Jere Sullanmaa	Tommi Rouvinen		FMCC 2006 (bronze)
2006–07	Jussi Uusipaavalniemi	Jukka Savonen	Petri Tsutsunen	Miska Arminen	Perttu Piilo, Paavo Kuosmanen		FMCC 2007 (5th)
2007–08	Jussi Uusipaavalniemi	Paavo Kuosmanen	Perttu Piilo	Petri Tsutsunen	Jukka Savonen		FMCC 2008 (silver)
2008–09	Jussi Uusipaavalniemi	Perttu Piilo	Paavo Kuosmanen	Petri Tsutsunen	Jukka Savonen		FMCC 2009 (5th)
2009–10	Kalle Kiiskinen	Paavo Kuosmanen	Juha Pekaristo	Perttu Piilo	Teemu Salo		FMCC 2010 (gold)
2010–11	Kalle Kiiskinen	Perttu Piilo	Teemu Salo	Paavo Kuosmanen	Juha Pekaristo	Jari Rouvinen	ECC 2010 (15th)
2010–11	Kalle Kiiskinen	Paavo Kuosmanen	Perttu Piilo	Teemu Salo	Juha Pekaristo		FMCC 2011 (4th)
2011–12	Kalle Kiiskinen	Paavo Kuosmanen	Perttu Piilo	Juha Pekaristo	Teemu Salo, Jari Rouvinen		FMCC 2012 (5th)
2012–13	Kalle Kiiskinen	Perttu Piilo	Teemu Salo	Juha Pekaristo	Paavo Kuosmanen, Wille Mäkelä		FMCC 2013 (silver)
2013–14	Kalle Kiiskinen	Juha Pekaristo	Perttu Piilo	Wille Mäkelä	Teemu Salo, Paavo Kuosmanen		FMCC 2014 (silver)
2014–15	Kalle Kiiskinen	Paavo Kuosmanen	Wille Mäkelä	Teemu Salo	Juha Pekaristo, Jari Rouvinen		FMCC 2015 (gold)
2015–16	Kalle Kiiskinen	Wille Mäkelä	Juha Pekaristo	Teemu Salo	Paavo Kuosmanen		FMCC 2016 (5th)
2016–17	Kalle Kiiskinen	Paavo Kuosmanen	Wille Mäkelä	Juha Pekaristo	Teemu Salo		FMCC 2017 (silver)
2017–18	Kalle Kiiskinen	Paavo Kuosmanen	Wille Mäkelä	Juha Pekaristo	Teemu Salo		FMCC 2018 (gold)
2018–19	Wille Mäkelä	Kalle Kiiskinen	Teemu Salo	Juha Pekaristo	Paavo Kuosmanen	Jouni Mikkonen	ECC 2018 (9th)
2018–19	Wille Mäkelä	Kalle Kiiskinen	Paavo Kuosmanen	Juha Pekaristo	Teemu Salo		FMCC 2019 (silver)
2019–20	Kalle Kiiskinen	Paavo Kuosmanen	Wille Mäkelä	Juha Pekaristo	Teemu Salo	Jouni Mikkonen	FMCC 2020 (gold)
2021–22	Kalle Kiiskinen	Teemu Salo	Leo Ouni	Paavo Kuosmanen	Jermu Pöllänen	Jouni Mikkonen	ECC 2021 (10th); WCC 2022 (11th)

=== Mixed ===
Season	Skip	Third	Second	Lead	Alternate	Coach	Events
2007–08	Jussi Uusipaavalniemi	Kirsi Kaski	Paavo Kuosmanen	Jaana Hämäläinen			FMxCC 2008 (gold)
2008–09	Jussi Uusipaavalniemi	Jaana Hämäläinen	Paavo Kuosmanen	Kirsi Kaski	Minna Uusipaavalniemi		EMxCC 2008 (11th)
2008–09	Jussi Uusipaavalniemi	Kirsi Kaski	Paavo Kuosmanen	Jaana Hämäläinen			FMxCC 2009 (gold)
2009–10	Jussi Uusipaavalniemi	Jaana Hämäläinen	Paavo Kuosmanen	Kirsi Kaski			EMxCC 2009 (7th)
2009–10	Jussi Uusipaavalniemi	Kirsi Kaski	Paavo Kuosmanen	Jaana Hämäläinen			FMxCC 2010 (5th)
2010–11	Jussi Uusipaavalniemi	Kirsi Kaski	Paavo Kuosmanen	Jaana Hämäläinen			FMxCC 2011 (gold)
2011–12	Jussi Uusipaavalniemi	Jaana Hämäläinen	Paavo Kuosmanen	Kirsi Kaski			EMxCC 2011 (8th)
2011–12	Jussi Uusipaavalniemi	Kirsi Kaski	Paavo Kuosmanen	Jaana Hämäläinen			FMxCC 2012 (5th)
2012–13	Jussi Uusipaavalniemi	Jaana Hämäläinen	Paavo Kuosmanen	Kirsi Kaski	Katja Kiiskinen		FMxCC 2013 (5th)
2014–15	Jussi Uusipaavalniemi	Johanna Pyyhtiä	Paavo Kuosmanen	Elina Virtaala			FMxCC 2015 (5th)
2015–16	Jussi Uusipaavalniemi	Laura Kitti	Paavo Kuosmanen	Johanna Pyyhtiä			FMxCC 2016 (4th)
2016–17	Jussi Uusipaavalniemi	Laura Kitti	Paavo Kuosmanen	Johanna Pyyhtiä			FMxCC 2017 (gold)
2017–18	Jussi Uusipaavalniemi	Laura Kitti	Paavo Kuosmanen	Johanna Pyyhtiä		Jaana Hakkinen	WMxCC 2017 (32nd)
2017–18	Jussi Uusipaavalniemi	Laura Kitti	Paavo Kuosmanen	Johanna Pyyhtiä			FMxCC 2018 (bronze)
2018–19	Jussi Uusipaavalniemi	Laura Kitti	Paavo Kuosmanen	Johanna Pyyhtiä			FMxCC 2019 (silver)

=== Mixed doubles ===
Season	Male	Female	Events	
2009—10	Katja Kiiskinen	Paavo Kuosmanen		FMDCC 2010 (4th)
2012—13	Katja Kiiskinen	Paavo Kuosmanen	Kalle Kiiskinen	WMDCC 2013 (18th)
2017—18	Tiina Suuripää	Paavo Kuosmanen		FMDCC 2018 (5th)
2018—19	NED Bonnie Nilhamn	FIN Paavo Kuosmanen		
2019—20	NED Bonnie Nilhamn	FIN Paavo Kuosmanen		

== Record as a coach of national teams ==
Year	Tournament, event	National team	Place
2005	2005 European Junior Curling Challenge	Finland (junior men)	5
2005	2005 European Junior Curling Challenge	Finland (junior women)	4
2008	2008 European Curling Championships	Finland (men)	11
2009	2009 World Men's Curling Championship	Finland (men)	12
2015	2015 World Mixed Doubles Curling Championship	Finland (mixed double)	14
2017	Curling at the 2018 Winter Olympics – Qualification event	Finland (men)	6
2019	2019 World Mixed Curling Championship	Finland (mixed)	20
2021	2021 World Mixed Doubles Curling Championship	Finland (mixed double)	17
