= Lynsay Ryan =

Canadian singer, musician, and songwriter

Lynsay Ryan (born in 1984) is a Canadian singer, multi-instrumentalist and songwriter from Kelowna, British Columbia, Canada. A graduate of McMaster University and University of Toronto.

She is the daughter of two-time world champion curling skip Pat Ryan. In 2005, Ryan posed in a see-through sarong in a calendar to promote women's curling.

== See also ==
- Ana Arce
- Daniela Jentsch
- Melanie Robillard
- Kasia Selwand
- Claudia Toth
