= Vikram Joshi =

Indian quizzer

Medal record

Quizzing

Representing India

IQA World Championships
Gold medal – first place	2014 Mumbai	Singles

Vikram Joshi (2 February 1977 – 14 April 2018) was an Indian quizzer and quizmaster who won the World Quizzing Championship (WQC) 2014. He was the first winner who wasn't based in England. In the 2013 contest, he stood 9th. In the 2015 contest, he came 42nd.

Named after the scientist Vikram Sarabhai, Joshi was born and raised in a scholarly Konkani Saraswat family based in Mumbai. Academically meritorious throughout, he studied Instrumentation Engineering at Vivekanand Education Society's Institute of Technology (VESIT), followed by a master’s in Computer Science Engineering at the University of Virginia. Soon after he worked at Sun Microsystems in Boston before returning to India, where he worked as a creative media professional.

After his WQC win, Joshi appeared in the eighth season of Kaun Banega Crorepati (an Indian television game show based on Who Wants to Be a Millionaire?) as one of the experts on the 'Triguni' lifeline (similar to the Three Wise Men lifeline on the US edition)

Joshi had been a quizmaster on several university quizzes, including ones at IIT Bombay, IIT BHU, and IIM Indore.

In 2018, he hosted the first National Elections Quiz conducted by the Election Commission of India.

Joshi was first diagnosed with lymphatic cancer in 2011. He died on 14 April 2018.
