= Jaana Hämäläinen =

Finnish curler

- Curler ♀
- Other names: Jaana Laurikka

Team
- Curling club: Hyvinkää CC

Curling career
- Member Association: Finland
- World Championship: 1 (1999)
- World Mixed Doubles Championship: 2 (2009, 2012)
- European Championship: 3 (1998, 1999, 2000)
- Other appearances: European Mixed Championship: 3 (2008, 2009, 2011), World Junior Championships: 1 (1993)
Medal record
Curling
Finnish Women's Championship
Gold medal – first place	1999
Gold medal – first place	2000
Gold medal – first place	2001

Jaana Hämäläinen (after marriage also known as Jaana Laurikka) is a Finnish curler.

At the national level, she is a three-time Finnish women's champion curler (1999, 2000, 2001), two-time Finnish mixed doubles champion curler (2009, 2012), three-time Finnish mixed champion curler (2008, 2009, 2011).

== Teams ==
=== Women's ===
Season	Skip	Third	Second	Lead	Alternate	Coach	Events
1992–93	Sari Suvanto (fourth)	Kirsi Nykänen (skip)	Jaana Hämäläinen	Heli Jalkanen			WJCC 1993 (7th)
1998–99	Anne Eerikäinen	Jaana Jokela	Jaana Hämäläinen	Tiina Kautonen		Anders Hed‚n	ECC 1998 (7th)
1998–99	Anne Eerikäinen	Jaana Häkkinen	Jaana Hämäläinen	Laura Franssila	Tiina Kautonen		FWCC 1999 (gold)
1998–99	Anne Eerikäinen	Tiina Kautonen	Jaana Hämäläinen	Jaana Jokela	Minna Malinen		WCC 1999 (8th)
1999–00	Jaana Hämäläinen (fourth)	Jaana Jokela (skip)	Laura Franssila	Tiina Kautonen		Kalle Kiiskinen	ECC 1999 (11th)
1999–00	Jaana Hämäläinen	Jaana Häkkinen	Nina Pöllänen	Tiina Kautonen	Laura Tsutsunen		FWCC 2000 (gold)
2000–01	Nina Pöllänen (fourth)	Jaana Jokela (skip)	Tiina Kautonen	Laura Tsutsunen	Jaana Hämäläinen		ECC 2000 (9th)
2000–01	Jaana Häkkinen	Nina Pöllänen	Laura Tsutsunen	Tiina Kautonen	Minna Soikkeli, Jaana Hämäläinen		FWCC 2001 (gold)

=== Mixed ===
Season	Skip	Third	Second	Lead	Alternate	Events
2007–08	Jussi Uusipaavalniemi	Kirsi Kaski	Paavo Kuosmanen	Jaana Hämäläinen		FMxCC 2008 (gold)
2008–09	Jussi Uusipaavalniemi	Jaana Hämäläinen	Paavo Kuosmanen	Kirsi Kaski	Minna Uusipaavalniemi	EMxCC 2008 (11th)
2008–09	Jussi Uusipaavalniemi	Kirsi Kaski	Paavo Kuosmanen	Jaana Hämäläinen		FMxCC 2009 (gold)
2009–10	Jussi Uusipaavalniemi	Jaana Hämäläinen	Paavo Kuosmanen	Kirsi Kaski		EMxCC 2009 (7th)
2009–10	Jussi Uusipaavalniemi	Kirsi Kaski	Paavo Kuosmanen	Jaana Hämäläinen		FMxCC 2010 (5th)
2010–11	Jussi Uusipaavalniemi	Kirsi Kaski	Paavo Kuosmanen	Jaana Hämäläinen		FMxCC 2011 (gold)
2011–12	Jussi Uusipaavalniemi	Jaana Hämäläinen	Paavo Kuosmanen	Kirsi Kaski		EMxCC 2011 (8th)
2011–12	Jussi Uusipaavalniemi	Kirsi Kaski	Paavo Kuosmanen	Jaana Hämäläinen		FMxCC 2012 (5th)
2012–13	Jussi Uusipaavalniemi	Jaana Hämäläinen	Paavo Kuosmanen	Kirsi Kaski	Katja Kiiskinen	FMxCC 2013 (5th)
2013–14	Jussi Uusipaavalniemi	Paavo Kuosmanen	Jaana Hämäläinen	Katja Kiiskinen		FMxCC 2014 (silver)

=== Mixed doubles ===
Season	Male	Female	Events
2008–09	Jussi Uusipaavalniemi	Jaana Hämäläinen	FMDCC 2009 (gold); WMDCC 2009 (5th)
2009–10	Jussi Uusipaavalniemi	Jaana Hämäläinen	FMDCC 2010 (10th)
2010–11	Jussi Uusipaavalniemi	Jaana Hämäläinen	FMDCC 2011 (4th)
2011–12	Jussi Uusipaavalniemi	Jaana Hämäläinen	FMDCC 2012 (gold); WMDCC 2012 (14th)
2013–14	Jussi Uusipaavalniemi	Jaana Hämäläinen	FMDCC 2014 (4th)

== Personal life ==
She started curling in 1990.
