= Katarzyna Selwant =

Polish curler

Katarzyna "Kasia" Selwant is the former Polish national curling team lead. In 2005, she posed for a calendar to promote women's curling. She played in both the 2004 and 2005 European Curling Championships for skip Krystyna Beniger. Poland finished 17th and 21st respectively.

== See also ==
- Ana Arce
- Daniela Jentsch
- Melanie Robillard
- Lynsay Ryan
- Claudia Toth
