= World Quizzing Championships =

The World Quizzing Championships is an individual quiz contest organised by the International Quizzing Association (the umbrella organisation of various quizzing activities from more than 25 countries around the world). The competition has been staged annually since 2003 (since 2004 in more than one country simultaneously) with an increasing number of contestants from an increasing number of nations. Since 2006, the competition has been staged on the first Saturday of every June.

Contestants answer questions from eight broad categories and can earn up to 30 points in each, for a potential score of 240. Prior to 2022, they were allowed to drop their lowest-scoring category, leaving a maximum of 210. Under these rules, Pat Gibson and Jesse Honey jointly hold the high score record with 186 points, achieving that mark in 2011 and 2012 respectively. Since the rules were changed to count all eight categories, Victoria Groce holds the record with 191 points, achieved in 2026.

== Format ==
The World Quizzing Championships are in the form of a written test taken by individuals that is administered at various locations around the world. All contestants receive the same questions, typically translated into their first language, at approximately the same time. The test consists of 240 questions, with 30 in each of eight broad genres, and is distributed as two packs of four papers each. Contestants have 60 minutes to complete each pack.

Once time expires, the papers are marked and contestants score one point for each correct answer. From 2003 to 2021, each contestant's lowest-scoring genre was dropped and their scores from the other seven were added to determine the final standings. Starting with the 2022 competition, all eight genres are included.

The genres and general content areas are a combination of academic and popular culture topics including:

Genre	Subjects
Culture	Architecture, Fine art, Museums, Mythology, Philosophy, Religion, World cultures
Entertainment	Ballet, Classical music, Film Music, Jazz & World Music, Opera, Pop music, Radio, Television
History	Civilizations, Current Affairs, Exploration, Famous People, History
Lifestyle	Costume, Design, Fashion, Food & Drink, Handicrafts, Health & Fitness, Human Body, New Age beliefs, Products & Brands, Tourism
Media	Comic strips, Comic books, Graphic novels, Film, Language, Literature
Sciences	Exact sciences (Chemistry, Physics, etc.), Fauna, Flora, Social sciences
Sport & Games	Games, Sports, Hobbies & Pastimes, Records & achievements (in context of genre)
World	Cities, Human Geography, Physical Geography, Inventions, Space, Technology, Transport

Some questions may appear to fit within more than one genre.

== List of WQC winners ==
=== By number of wins ===
The table below shows the medalists from each year, along with the years that a player won the championship.

Name	1st place, gold medalist(s)	2nd place, silver medalist(s)	3rd place, bronze medalist(s)	Total	Years won
(England) Kevin Ashman	6	4	2	12	2004, 2005, 2006, 2009, 2016, 2017
(England) Pat Gibson	4	5	4	13	2007, 2010, 2011, 2013
(England) Olav Bjortomt	4	1	0	5	2003, 2015, 2018, 2019
(Belgium) Ronny Swiggers	2	2	3	7	2021, 2023
(United States) Victoria Groce	2	2	1	5	2024, 2026
(France) Didier Bruyere	1	2	0	3	2022
(England) Daoud Jackson	1	1	0	2	2025
(England) Mark Bytheway	1	0	2	3	2008
(England) Jesse Honey	1	0	0	1	2012
(India) Vikram Joshi	1	0	0	1	2014
(Singapore) Ravikant Avva	1	0	0	1	2020
(United States) Steve Perry	0	3	1	4	—N/a
(Finland) Tero Kalliolevo	0	1	4	5	—N/a
(Belgium) Tom Trogh	0	1	1	2	—N/a
(United States) Troy Meyer	0	1	0	1	—N/a
(Belgium) Lander Frederickx	0	1	0	1	—N/a
(Belgium) Nico Pattyn	0	0	2	2	—N/a
(England) Alan Gibbs	0	0	1	1	—N/a
(England) Evan Lynch	0	0	1	1	—N/a
(India) Ashish	0	0	1	1	—N/a
(Croatia) Krešimir Štimac	0	0	1	1	—N/a

=== By year ===
The table below shows the top-three placings from each year.

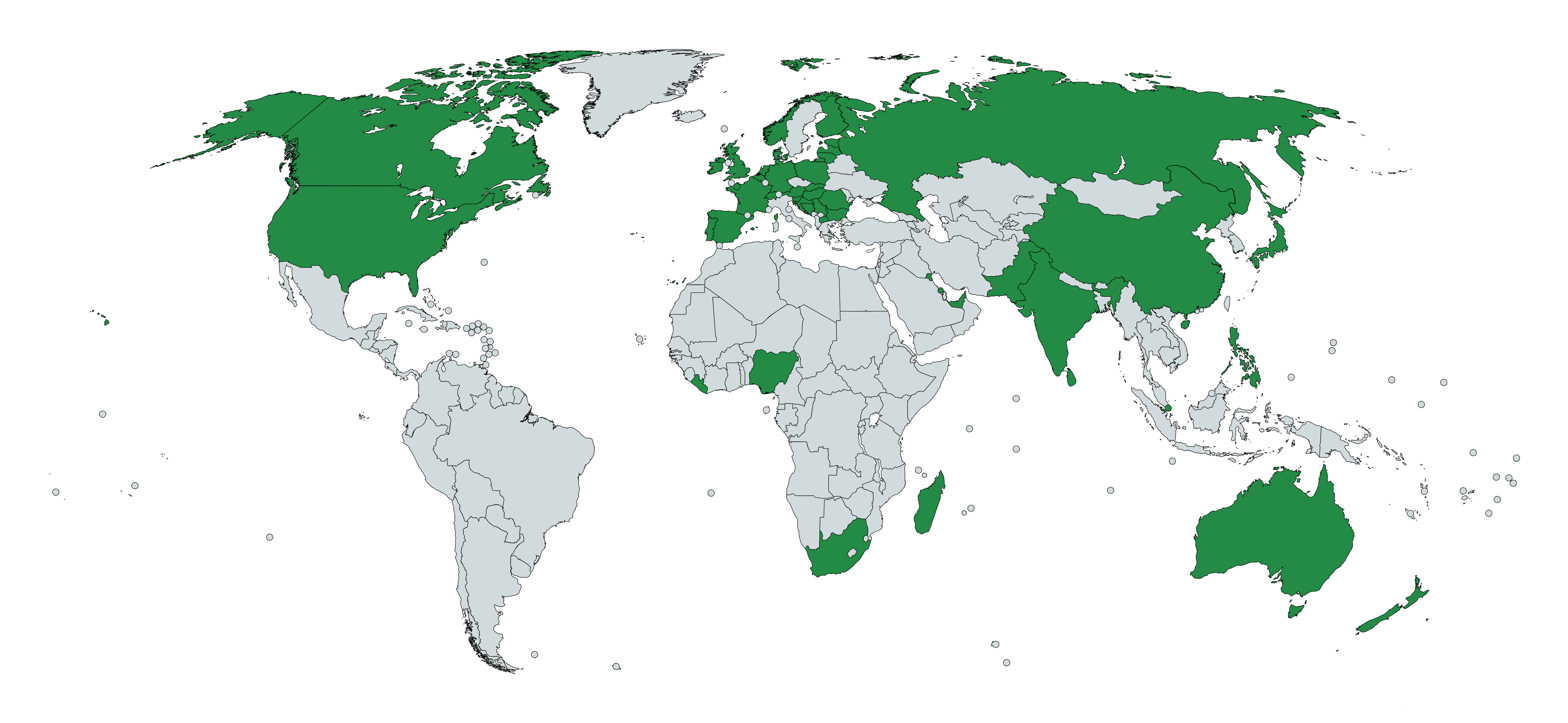
Participating countries in the 2024 World Quizzing Championships

Year	(gold) Winner	(silver) Runner-up	(bronze) Third place
2026	(United States) Victoria Groce	(Belgium) Lander Frederickx	(Belgium) Tom Trogh
2025	(England) Daoud Jackson	(United States) Victoria Groce	(Belgium) Ronny Swiggers
2024	(United States) Victoria Groce	(England) Daoud Jackson	(Belgium) Ronny Swiggers
2023	(Belgium) Ronny Swiggers	(United States) Victoria Groce	(England) Evan Lynch
2022	(France) Didier Bruyere	(Belgium) Tom Trogh	(Croatia) Krešimir Štimac
2021	(Belgium) Ronny Swiggers	(France) Didier Bruyere	(Finland) Tero Kalliolevo
2020 (Note: The 2020 competition was largely contested online.)	(Singapore) Ravikant Avva	(United States) Troy Meyer	(United States) Victoria Groce
2019	(England) Olav Bjortomt	(United States) Steve Perry	(Finland) Tero Kalliolevo
2018	(England) Olav Bjortomt	(United States) Steve Perry	(England) Pat Gibson
2017	(England) Kevin Ashman	(France) Didier Bruyere	(England) Pat Gibson
2016	(England) Kevin Ashman	(England) Olav Bjortomt	(England) Pat Gibson
2015	(England) Olav Bjortomt	(England) Kevin Ashman	(England) Pat Gibson
2014	(India) Vikram Joshi	(United States) Steve Perry	(England) Kevin Ashman
2013	(England) Pat Gibson	(Finland) Tero Kalliolevo	(England) Kevin Ashman
2012	(England) Jesse Honey	(England) Pat Gibson	(United States) Steve Perry
2011	(England) Pat Gibson	(England) Kevin Ashman	(Finland) Tero Kalliolevo
2010	(England) Pat Gibson	(England) Kevin Ashman	(Belgium) Ronny Swiggers
2009	(England) Kevin Ashman	(Belgium) Ronny Swiggers	(England) Mark Bytheway
2008	(England) Mark Bytheway	(Belgium) Ronny Swiggers	(Finland) Tero Kalliolevo
2007	(England) Pat Gibson	(England) Kevin Ashman	(England) Mark Bytheway
2006	(England) Kevin Ashman	(England) Pat Gibson	(Belgium) Nico Pattyn
2005	(England) Kevin Ashman	(England) Pat Gibson	(Belgium) Nico Pattyn
2004	(England) Kevin Ashman	(England) Pat Gibson	(India) Ashish
2003	(England) Olav Bjortomt	(England) Pat Gibson	(England) Alan Gibbs

== Competition history ==
=== 2003 ===
A fledgling event was first staged by Quizzing.co.uk in 2003 at Villa Park football stadium, Birmingham, England. This saw 50 quizzers representing a handful of nations compete in a written test of quiz knowledge. The inaugural event was won by Olav Bjortomt. The event has full official status but only took place in one country and is sometimes erroneously omitted in statistics.

=== 2004 ===
In 2004, following the foundation of the International Quizzing Association (IQA), the event was held simultaneously in five countries: the United Kingdom (joined by quizzers from elsewhere, including Ireland), Belgium (joined by quizzers from the Netherlands), Estonia, India, and Malaysia. Over 300 quizzers took part. The UK leg was staged at Manchester United's Old Trafford football stadium. The 2004 winner was Kevin Ashman.

1. (England) Kevin Ashman – 154
2. (England) Pat Gibson – 135
3. (India) Ashish – 128
4. (Belgium) Nico Pattyn – 126
5. (Belgium) Frank Van Nieuwenhove – 124
6. (England) Ian Bayley – 118
7. (England) David Stainer – 117
8. (India) Arul Mani – 116
9. (England) Stephen Pearson – 115
10. (Estonia) Lauri Naber – 115

=== 2005 ===
The 2005 championship on July 2, saw further significant growth with the event benefiting from the sponsorship of MSN Search (later Microsoft Bing). Countries joining the original five competing nations included Australia, Finland, Indonesia, Norway and Singapore. Quizzers sat eight papers of 30 questions each, covering: 'Culture', 'Entertainment', 'History', 'Lifestyle', 'Media', 'Sciences', 'Sport and Games', and 'World', with the lowest score from the eight genres being dropped – although these did come into play to settle tie-break situations. The eight genres were won outright or shared by quizzers from seven countries (Belgium, England, Estonia, Finland, India, Ireland, and Norway).

Efforts to encourage the participation of women in the contest (competitive quizzing has hitherto been something of a male-dominated pastime) were rewarded in 2005 with a win for Trine Aalborg of Norway in the 'Lifestyle' category and a sixth place overall for Dorjana Širola of Croatia (who also finished 3rd among those competitors who had gathered at Silverstone motor racing circuit for the UK leg of the competition). In India, another woman, Debashree Mitra of Bangalore took 3rd place overall.

1. (England) Kevin Ashman – 161
2. (England) Pat Gibson – 154
3. (Belgium) Nico Pattyn – 151
4. (Belgium) Marc Van Springel – 144
5. (India) Arul Mani – 144
6. (Croatia) Dorjana Širola – 139 (first woman)
7. (Estonia) Ove Põder – 138
8. (Estonia) Lauri Naber – 138
9. (Belgium) Erik Derycke – 138
10. (England) Ian Bayley – 138

=== 2006 ===
On June 3, 2006, the World Quizzing Championships were held at more than 15 locations. First time organisers were Lithuania, Germany, Switzerland, Liberia and Sri Lanka. People of a multitude of nationalities took part, including representatives from the United States, Australia, Russia, Singapore, Hungary, and France. The title was, for the 3rd year running, won by Kevin Ashman.

1. (England) Kevin Ashman – 166
2. (England) Pat Gibson – 163
3. (Belgium) Nico Pattyn – 155
4. (Belgium) Marc Van Springel – 146
5. (England) Olav Bjortomt – 142
6. (Belgium) Ronny Swiggers – 140
7. (Croatia) Dorjana Širola – 140 (highest placed woman)
8. (England) Mark Bytheway – 136
9. (Belgium) Erik Derycke – 136
10. (England) Ian Bayley – 133

=== 2007 ===
On June 2, 2007, the World Quizzing Championships was held at locations including the Netherlands, the US and Hungary for the first time. Pat Gibson took the crown from three-time winner Kevin Ashman.

1. (England) Pat Gibson – 179
2. (England) Kevin Ashman – 176
3. (England) Mark Bytheway – 171
4. (England) Olav Bjortomt – 164
5. (England) Jesse Honey – 159
6. (Belgium) Ronny Swiggers – 158
7. (England) Ian Bayley – 151
8. (Wales) Mark Grant – 151
9. (Belgium) Nico Pattyn – 150
10. (India) Arul Mani – 150

Dorjana Širola of Croatia was the highest placed woman in 12th position. Paul Paquet from Canada placed highest in the New York City leg, the first time the WQC was held in North America.

=== 2008 ===
The 2008 World Quizzing Championships were held on June 7, 2008 at more than 30 locations, including for the first time Australia, the Philippines, Canada, China, Bangladesh, and Latvia. Mark Bytheway took the world title in a close race with Belgium's Ronny Swiggers and Finland's Tero Kalliolevo.

1. (England) Mark Bytheway – 173
2. (Belgium) Ronny Swiggers – 172
3. (Finland) Tero Kalliolevo – 170
4. (England) Kevin Ashman – 167
5. (England) Pat Gibson – 165
6. (Belgium) Nico Pattyn – 163
7. (England) Olav Bjortomt – 155
8. (England) Ian Bayley – 154
9. (England) Jesse Honey – 152
10. (Croatia) Dorjana Širola – 150 (best performing woman)

=== 2009 ===
The 2009 World Quizzing Championships were held on June 6, 2009 at more than 45 locations, including 10 venues in the US, 9 in India and 4 in Russia. Kevin Ashman regained his title and became the first ever to win 4 World Quizzing Championships. Second again was Ronny Swiggers from Belgium. Third was last year's champion Mark Bytheway. Jeopardy! legend Jerome Vered, whose all-time single-day winnings record lasted 10 or 12 years (depending on whether adjustment for the doubling of the clue values is used), placed eighth.

1. (England) Kevin Ashman – 177
2. (Belgium) Ronny Swiggers – 174
3. (England) Mark Bytheway – 166
4. (England) Olav Bjortomt – 165
5. (Belgium) Nico Pattyn – 165
6. (England) Pat Gibson – 164
7. (Finland) Tero Kalliolevo – 156
8. (United States) Jerome Vered – 155
9. (England) Jesse Honey – 152
10. (Norway) Thomas Kolåsæter – 148

Dorjana Širola of Croatia was the highest placed woman in 22nd position with 135 points.

=== 2010 ===
The 2010 World Quizzing Championships were held on June 5, 2010 at almost seventy locations, adding Armenia, Bulgaria, Morocco, and the Republic of Ireland for the first time. Over 1200 people participated. Five nations were represented among the competitors placed in the top 10 overall. The overall winner was Pat Gibson.

Individual (Top 10)
Pos	Name	Country	Score
1	Pat Gibson	England	180
2	Kevin Ashman	England	169
3	Ronny Swiggers	Belgium	169
4	Tero Kalliolevo	Finland	166
5	Olav Bjortomt	England	165
6	Nico Pattyn	Belgium	151
7	Mark Grant	Wales	149
8	Thomas Kolåsæter	Norway	147
9	Erik Derycke	Belgium	147
10	David Beck	Belgium	146
Nation (Ranked by highest placed team member, Top 10)
Pos	Country	Highest placed team member	Score
1	England	1 – Pat Gibson	180
2	Belgium	3 – Ronny Swiggers	169
3	Finland	4 – Tero Kalliolevo	166
4	Wales	7 – Mark Grant	149
5	Norway	8 – Thomas Kolåsæter	147
6	Estonia	12 – Ove Põder	144
7	Croatia	17 – Dorjana Širola	140
8	United States	19 – Steve Perry	139
9	Scotland	23 – Barry Simmons	135
10	Germany	24 – Holger Waldenberger	135

Dorjana Širola of Croatia was the highest placed woman in 17th position with 140 points.

=== 2011 ===
The 2011 World Quizzing Championships took place on Saturday, June 4 with the planned addition of venues in Denmark, Gibraltar and Madagascar. Reigning champion Pat Gibson achieved the highest score in England with 186 and retained his title. Four times champion Kevin Ashman made 176. Tero Kalliolevo achieved the highest score in Finland with 176. Ronny Swiggers achieved the highest score in Belgium with 168. Steve Perry achieved the highest score in USA with 164. Mark Grant achieved the highest score in Wales with 163. Thomas Kolåsæter achieved the highest score in Norway with 158.

Individual (Top 10)
Pos	Name	Country	Score
1	Pat Gibson	England	186
2	Kevin Ashman	England	176
3	Tero Kalliolevo	Finland	176
4	Jesse Honey	England	172
5	Ronny Swiggers	Belgium	168
6	Olav Bjortomt	England	168
7	Nico Pattyn	Belgium	167
8	Steve Perry	USA	164
9	Mark Grant	Wales	163
10	Tom Trogh	Belgium	159

Genre Winners (Top Score = 30)
Genre	Winner	Country	Score
Entertainment	Scott Dawson	England	28
Culture	Pat Gibson	England	29
Lifestyle	Pat Gibson	England	27
Sciences	Pat Gibson	England	28
History	Nico Pattyn	Belgium	28
Media	Jussi Suvanto	Finland	29
Sport	Tom Trogh	Belgium	26
World	Pat Gibson; Paul Lujan	Ireland; Switzerland	26

=== 2012 ===
The 2012 event was held on June 2, 2012, with over 1,700 participants competing at 88 locations in 35 countries. Defending champion Pat Gibson was beaten into second place by Jesse Honey with a score of 186. For the first time ever, someone scored full marks in one genre with Ishaan Chugh, a quizzer from India, scoring 30/30 in the Media section.

Individual (Top 10)
Pos	Name	Country	Score
1	Jesse Honey	England	186
2	Pat Gibson	England	177
3	Steve Perry	USA	174
4	Kevin Ashman	England	172
5	Olav Bjortomt	England	170
6	Mark Grant	Wales	170
7	Sean Carey	England	169
8	Ronny Swiggers	Belgium	166
9	David Stainer	England	164
10	Tero Kalliolevo	Finland	164

Genre Winners (Max. Score = 30)
Genre	Winner	Country	Score
Entertainment	Holger Waldenberger	Germany	27
Culture	Ove Põder	Estonia	28
Lifestyle	Sean Carey	England	29
Sciences	Pat Gibson	England	26
History	Jesse Honey; Tero Kalliolevo; Mark Grant	England; Finland; Wales	28
Media	Ishaan Chugh	India	30
Sport	Tom Trogh	Belgium	27
World	Jesse Honey	England	27

=== 2013 ===
The 2013 World Quizzing Championship took place on 1 June. A record 1,992 participants competed with India being the most represented country.

Individual (Top 10)
Pos	Name	Country	Score
1	Pat Gibson	England	172
2	Tero Kalliolevo	Finland	168
3	Kevin Ashman	England	163
4	Olav Bjortomt	England	161
5	Ove Põder	Estonia	158
6	Steve Perry	USA	156
7	Mark Grant	Wales	156
8	Ronny Swiggers	Belgium	155
9	Vikram Joshi	India	153
10	Didier Bruyere	France	152

Genre Winners (Max. Score = 30)
Genre	Winner	Country	Score
Entertainment	Pat Gibson	England	26
Culture	Vikram Joshi	India	27
Lifestyle	Steven Perry	USA	23
Sciences	Pat Gibson	England	26
History	Ove Põder	Estonia	28
Media	Olav Bjortomt; Yogesh Raut	England; USA	28
Sport	Tom Trogh; Igor Habal	Belgium; Estonia	27
World	Tero Kalliolevo	Finland	27

=== 2014 ===
The 2014 World Quizzing Championship took place on 7 June with 1,833 participants.

Individual (Top 10)
Pos	Name	Country	Score
1	Vikram Joshi	India	176
2	Steven Perry	USA	174
3	Kevin Ashman	England	171
4	Olav Bjortomt	England	160
5	Pat Gibson	England	157
6	Tero Kalliolevo	Finland	154
7	Ronny Swiggers	Belgium	154
8	Nico Pattyn	Belgium	151
9	Mark Grant	Wales	150
10	Ian Bayley	England	148

Genre Winners (Max. Score = 30)
Genre	Winner	Country	Score
Entertainment	Steve Perry	USA	26
History	Vikram Joshi	India	30
Lifestyle	Vikram Joshi	India	24
Sciences	Joe Trela	USA	26
Culture	Kevin Ashman	England	28
Media	Kevin Ashman	England	29
Sport	Igor Habal	Estonia	27
World	Vikram Joshi; Nico Pattyn; Steve Perry	India; Belgium; USA	25

=== 2015 ===
The 2015 World Quizzing Championship took place on 6 June with over 2,000 participants.

Individual (Top 10)
Pos	Name	Country	Score
1	Olav Bjortomt	England	161
2	Kevin Ashman	England	157
3	Pat Gibson	England	156
4	Tero Kalliolevo	Finland	151
5	Holger Waldenberger	Germany	144
6	Ove Põder	Estonia	144
7	Tom Trogh	Belgium	142
8	Ronny Swiggers	Belgium	142
9	Thomas Kolåsæter	Norway	141
10	Nico Pattyn	Belgium	141

Genre Winners (Max. Score = 30)
Genre	Winner	Country	Score
Entertainment	Jussi Suvanto; Olav Bjortomt; Ove Põder	Finland; England; Estonia	22
History	Ian Bayley	England	24
Lifestyle	Daniel Melia; Olav Bjortomt	USA; England	21
Sciences	Ian Bayley; Nick Mills; Pat Gibson	England; England; England	24
Culture	Tero Kalliolevo	Finland	26
Media	Olav Bjortomt	England	27
Sport	Olav Bjortomt	England	24
World	Geir H. Kristiansen; Pat Gibson	Norway; England	29

=== 2016 ===
The 2016 World Quizzing Championship took place on 4 June with over 2,500 participants.

Individual (Top 10)
Pos	Name	Country	Score
1	Kevin Ashman	England	171
2	Olav Bjortomt	England	167
3	Pat Gibson	England	165
4	Mark Grant	Wales	163
5	Ronny Swiggers	Belgium	161
6	Tom Trogh	Belgium	162
7	Ian Bayley	England	160
8	Didier Bruyere	France	160
9	Tero Kalliolevo	Finland	159
10	David Stainer	England	156

Genre Winners (Max. Score = 30)
Genre	Winner	Country	Score
Media	Olav Bjortomt	England	30
World	Kevin Ashman; Patrick Friel; Tero Kalliolevo; Holger Waldenberger	England; USA; Finland; Germany	22
Entertainment	Susannah Brooks; David Dixon; Mark Grant; Paul Sinha	USA; USA; Wales; England	24
History	Kevin Ashman	England	29
Science	Pat Gibson	England	27
Sport	Kevin Ashman; Hugh Bennett; Tim Westcott	England; England; England	26
Lifestyle	Mark Ryder	USA	26
Culture	Kevin Ashman; Ian Bayley; Olav Bjortomt; Tero Kalliolevo; Nico Pattyn	England; England; England; Finland; Belgium	24

=== 2017 ===
Individual (Top 10)
Pos	Name	Country	Score
1	Kevin Ashman	England	169
2	Didier Bruyere	France	163
3	Pat Gibson	England	160
4	Tom Trogh	Belgium	159
5	Ronny Swiggers	Belgium	156
6	Tim Polley	USA	155
7	Tero Kalliolevo	Finland	155
8	Ian Bayley	England	154
9	Ove Põder	Estonia	153
10	Mark Grant	Wales	153

Genre Winners (Max. Score = 30)
Genre	Winner	Country	Score
Media	Olav Bjortomt	England	28
World	Mark Henry; Gary Grant; Nico Pattyn	Ireland; Scotland; Belgium	23
Entertainment	Olav Bjortomt	England	23
History	Andrew Frazer; Kevin Ashman	Scotland; England	26
Science	Pat Gibson	England	27
Sport	Igor Habal	Estonia	25
Lifestyle	Tom Trogh; Pat Gibson; Didier Bruyere; Susannah Brooks; Ronny Swiggers; Steve Cooke	Belgium; England; France; USA; Belgium; Scotland	26
Culture	Espen Kibsgård; Kevin Ashman	Norway; England	25

=== 2018 ===
Individual (Top 10)
Pos	Name	Country	Score
1	Olav Bjortomt	England	164
2	Steven Perry	USA	159
3	Pat Gibson	England	159
4	Igor Habal	Estonia	158
5	Ronny Swiggers	Belgium	157
6	Kevin Ashman	England	156
7	Didier Bruyere	France	152
8	Tom Trogh	Belgium	149
9	Mark Grant	Wales	148
10	Nico Pattyn	Belgium	146

Genre Winners (Max. Score = 30)
Genre	Winner	Country	Score
Media	Ishaan Chugh	India	28
World	Tomislav Bleiziffer	Croatia	27
Entertainment	Olav Bjortomt	England	25
History	Jakob Myers; Kevin Ashman	USA; England	25
Science	Pat Gibson	England	27
Sport	Igor Habal	Estonia	29
Lifestyle	Steven Perry; Eric Smith; Jerome Vered	USA; Canada; USA	27
Culture	Kevin Ashman	England	26

=== 2019 ===
Individual (Top 10)
Pos	Name	Country	Score
1	Olav Bjortomt	England	171
2	Steven Perry	USA	168
3	Tero Kalliolevo	Finland	167
4	Kevin Ashman	England	166
5	Pat Gibson	England	166
6	Ronny Swiggers	Belgium	164
7	Didier Bruyere	France	164
8	Ian Bayley	England	163
9	Thomas Kolåsæter	Norway	162
10	Troy Meyer	USA	159

Genre Winners (Max. Score = 30)
Genre	Winner	Country	Score
Media	Ishaan Chugh	India	29
World	Pat Gibson	England	28
Entertainment	Troy Meyer	USA	27
History	Olav Bjortomt; Steven Perry; Nico Pattyn; Ravikant Avva	England; USA; Belgium; Singapore	27
Science	Ian Bayley; Lander Frederickx	England; Belgium	25
Sport	Mark Preston	England	26
Lifestyle	Olav Bjortomt; Ronny Swiggers	England; Belgium	26
Culture	Daoud Jackson	England	25

=== 2020 ===
Individual (Top 10)
Pos	Name	Country	Score
1	Ravikant Avva	Singapore	159
2	Troy Meyer	USA	156
3	Victoria Groce	USA	155
4	Ronny Swiggers	Belgium	154
5	Yogesh Raut	USA	153
6	Tom Trogh	Belgium	150
7	Igor Habal	Estonia	149
8	Kaarel Silmato	Estonia	148
9	Olav Bjortomt	England	148
10	Pat Gibson	England	146

Genre Winners (Max. Score = 30)
Genre	Winner	Country	Score
Culture	Guy Jordan; Victoria Groce; Ravikant Avva; Troy Meyer; Ronny Swiggers	USA; USA; Singapore; USA; Belgium	25
Entertainment	Daniel Cohen	USA	25
History	Daoud Jackson	England	26
Media	Yogesh Raut	USA	27
Lifestyle	Daniel Cohen	USA	26
Science	Nick Mills; Tom Trogh; Ravikant Avva; Ronny Swiggers	England; Belgium; Singapore; Belgium	22
Sport & Games	Ravikant Avva	Singapore	25
World	Shane Whitlock	USA	26

=== 2021 ===
Individual (Top 10)
Pos	Name	Country	Score
1	Ronny Swiggers	Belgium	166
2	Didier Bruyere	France	161
3	Tero Kalliolevo	Finland	156
4	Olav Bjortomt	England	156
5	Tom Trogh	Belgium	154
6	Daoud Jackson	England	152
7	Pat Gibson	England	150
8	Kaarel Silmato	Estonia	149
9	Troy Meyer	USA	148
10	Victoria Groce	USA	146

Genre Winners (Max. Score = 30)
Genre	Winner	Country	Score
Culture	Ronny Swiggers	Belgium	24
Entertainment	Daoud Jackson	England	26
History	Didier Bruyere; Jakob Myers	France; USA	26
Media	Mark Preston	England	25
Lifestyle	Ronny Swiggers	Belgium	26
Science	Tero Kalliolevo	Finland	26
Sport & Games	Mark Preston; Ravikant Avva	England; Singapore	26
World	Tero Kalliolevo	Finland	26

=== 2022 ===
Individual (Top 10)
Pos	Name	Country	Score
1	Didier Bruyere	France	183
2	Tom Trogh	Belgium	177
3	Krešimir Štimac	Croatia	176
4	Daoud Jackson	England	176
5	Ronny Swiggers	Belgium	176
6	Olav Bjortomt	England	174
7	Victoria Groce	USA	172
8	Steven Perry	USA	169
9	Pat Gibson	England	167
10	Evan Lynch	England	162

Genre Winners (Max. Score = 30)
Genre	Winner	Country	Score
Culture	Olav Bjortomt; Evan Lynch	England	25
Entertainment	Troy Meyer	USA	22
History	Steven Perry	USA	26
Media	Olav Bjortomt	England	25
Lifestyle	Didier Bruyere; Pat Gibson; Ronny Swiggers; Tom Trogh; Victoria Groce	France; England; Belgium; Belgium; USA	25
Science	Didier Bruyere	France	23
Sport & Games	Tom Trogh	Belgium	28
World	Krešimir Štimac	Croatia	26

=== 2023 ===
Individual (Top 10)
Pos	Name	Country	Score
1	Ronny Swiggers	Belgium	171
2	Victoria Groce	USA	170
3	Evan Lynch	England	164
4	Tom Trogh	Belgium	161
5	Olav Bjortomt	England	159
6	Pat Gibson	England	158
7	Daoud Jackson	England	158
8	Kevin Ashman	England	157
9	Ian Bayley	England	154
10	Franco Sottopietra	Austria	152

Genre Winners (Max. Score = 30)
Genre	Winner	Country	Score
Culture	Ronny Swiggers	Belgium	26
Entertainment	Victoria Groce	USA	22
History	Jakob Myers	USA	26
Media	Victoria Groce	USA	25
Lifestyle	Ronny Swiggers	Belgium	23
Science	Ian Bayley; Tom Trogh; Lander Frederickx; Evan Lynch; Martin Ehrl; Bart Lecomte	England; Belgium; Belgium; England; Germany; Belgium	22
Sport & Games	Tom Trogh	Belgium	28
World	Ronny Swiggers; Patrick Friel	Belgium; USA	23

=== 2024 ===
Individual (Top 10)
Pos	Name	Country	Score
1	Victoria Groce	USA	170
2	Daoud Jackson	England	166
3	Ronny Swiggers	Belgium	159
4	Ian Bayley	England	157
5	Pat Gibson	England	156
6	Evan Lynch	England	156
7	Shane Whitlock	USA	153
8	Olav Bjortomt	England	151
9	Jack Pollock	Scotland	150
10	Kevin Ashman	England	149

Genre Winners (Max. Score = 30)
Genre	Winner	Country	Score
Culture	Olav Bjortomt; Victoria Groce	England; USA	22
Entertainment	Andrew Ullsperger; Pam Mueller; Patrick Friel; Tim Hall	USA; USA; USA; Ireland	19
History	Kevin Ashman; Shane Whitlock; Matt Jackson	England; USA; USA	23
Media	Olav Bjortomt	England	23
Lifestyle	Pat Gibson; Victoria Groce	England; USA	24
Science	Ian Bayley	England	26
Sport & Games	Daoud Jackson	England	23
World	Daoud Jackson; Victoria Groce	England; USA	26

=== 2025 ===
Individual (Top 10)
Pos	Name	Country	Score
1	Daoud Jackson	England	187
2	Victoria Groce	USA	182
3	Ronny Swiggers	Belgium	181
4	Ian Bayley	England	180
5	Evan Lynch	England	179
6	Shane Whitlock	USA	176
7	Pat Gibson	England	176
8	Tim Van der Heyden	Belgium	175
9	Neven Trgovec	Croatia	175
10	Jack Pollock	Scotland	173

Genre Winners (Max. Score = 30)
Genre	Winner(s)	Country	Score
Culture	Ronny Swiggers	Belgium	28
Entertainment	Ole Martin Halck; Victoria Groce	Norway; USA	25
History	Matt Jackson	USA	27
Media	Olav Bjortomt	England	26
Lifestyle	Pieter Verlee; Daoud Jackson	Belgium; England	27
Science	Ian Bayley	England	27
Sport & Games	Neven Trgovec	Croatia	26
World	Mark Grant; Pat Gibson	Wales; England	25

=== 2026 ===
Individual (Top 10)
Pos	Name	Country	Score
1	Victoria Groce	USA	191
2	Lander Frederickx	Belgium	184
3	Tom Trogh	Belgium	182
4	Evan Lynch	England	179
5	Tero Kalliolevo	Finland	178
6	Ronny Swiggers	Belgium	176
7	Daoud Jackson	England	176
8	Mark Henry	Ireland	174
9	Pat Gibson	England	174
10	David Plotkin	USA	172

Genre Winners (Max. Score = 30)
Genre	Winner(s)	Country	Score
Culture	Ronny Swiggers; Jack Pollock	Belgium; Scotland	27
Entertainment	Victoria Groce; Lander Frederickx	USA; Belgium	26
History	Jakob Myers	USA	26
Media	Victoria Groce	USA	27
Lifestyle	Adam Hancock	Canada	25
Science	Victoria Groce	USA	25
Sport & Games	Tom Trogh	Belgium	26
World	Jack Pollock; Ian Bayley; Aaron Bader	Scotland; England; USA	26

== See also ==
- Australian Quiz Champion
- British Quizzing Championships
- International Quizzing Championships
- Asia-Pacific Quiz Championships
- Nordic Quizzing Championships
- 2024 Quiz Olympiad
- 2021 Quiz Olympiad
- 2016 Quiz Olympiad
