= Paul Paquet (trivia writer) =

Paul Stephen Paquet (born January 24, 1965) is a nationally syndicated trivia columnist and a trivia writer, based in Ottawa, Ontario, Canada.

After graduating university, Paquet wrote trivia questions for the online service Prodigy and Seth Godin. In 1995, he and his wife Laura began Cornerstone Creative Communications (now known as Cornerstone World Company), which offered writing, editing and research services, and public and media relations. He began running pub trivia in Ottawa in 1998, starting at the Barley Mow pub on Bank Street in Old Ottawa South. The Ottawa Trivia League, has been featured in a mini-documentary on TVOntario.

In 2002, Paquet began hosting World Trivia Night, the world's largest live non-radio annual trivia event.

In December 2008, he took over the Trivia Bits column from Stanley Newman. It runs in 14 newspapers throughout the United States. In 2015, he started writing a trivia column for Reader's Digest. In addition, he has written for Trivial Pursuit, Uncle John's Bathroom Reader, the Canadian game show Instant Cash and many others.

In 2007, Paquet won the North American leg of the World Quizzing Championships. In 2008, he finished in second place. He has since retired as a player and writes questions for the event itself.

A team he coached at Lisgar Collegiate also won the Ottawa championship for Reach for the Top. He has also hosted the game "Smartypants" at various Game Show Congress and Trivia Championships of North America events beginning in 2005.

In 2023, Paquet celebrated 25 years of running trivia nights in Ottawa.

== Personal life ==
Paquet attended Laval Catholic High School in Laval, Quebec where he was a member of the Reach for the Top team. He has a public relations degree.

Paquet is married to Laura Byrne Paquet, a former contestant on Jeopardy! and a writer. They live in Old Ottawa South.
