= Melanie Robillard =

Canadian-German curler (born 1982)

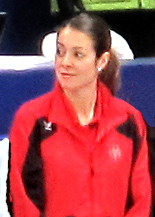
- Melanie Robillard at the 2010 Winter Olympics

Personal information
- Born: 3 October 1982 (age 43) Sussex
- Height: 1.68 m (5 ft 6 in)

Sport
- Country: Germany
- Sport: Curling
Medal record
Curling
Representing Germany
World Championships
Gold medal – first place	2010 Swift Current
European Championships
Gold medal – first place	2009 Aberdeen
European Mixed
Gold medal – first place	2008 Kitzbühel

Melanie Robillard (born October 3, 1982, in Sussex, New Brunswick) is a curler originally from Ottawa, Ontario, Canada. She represented Germany at the Vancouver 2010 Winter Olympic Games, playing third for Andrea Schöpp. Currently, she lives in Switzerland.

== Career ==
As a junior, Robillard curled for Jenn Hanna's team in 2000 as her lead. The rink would lose in the Ontario provincial junior finals that year, to Julie Reddick. In 2002, Robillard skipped her team to the provincial junior finals, but lost once again to Reddick. Robillard, who has a German mother, officially played alternate for the German team at the 2008 Ford World Women's Curling Championship, but ended up playing second for seven of the eleven matches. Later in the year, she played lead for the German mixed team that won the gold medal at the 2008 European Mixed Curling Championship. She competed on the German women's teams, skipped by Andrea Schöpp, as third in the 2010 Winter Olympics, and in the 2010 Ford World Women's Curling Championship, which they won.

In 2011, she coached both the Spanish men's and women's teams at the European Curling Championships.

== Personal life ==
Robillard formerly studied law at the Université libre de Bruxelles. She worked as a Compliance Officer for an investment firm. She speaks French, English, German and Spanish.

In 2005, Robillard posed topless for a calendar to promote women's curling.

== See also ==
- Ana Arce
- Daniela Jentsch
- Lynsay Ryan
- Kasia Selwand
- Claudia Toth
