= Nordic Quizzing Championships =

International quizzing competition

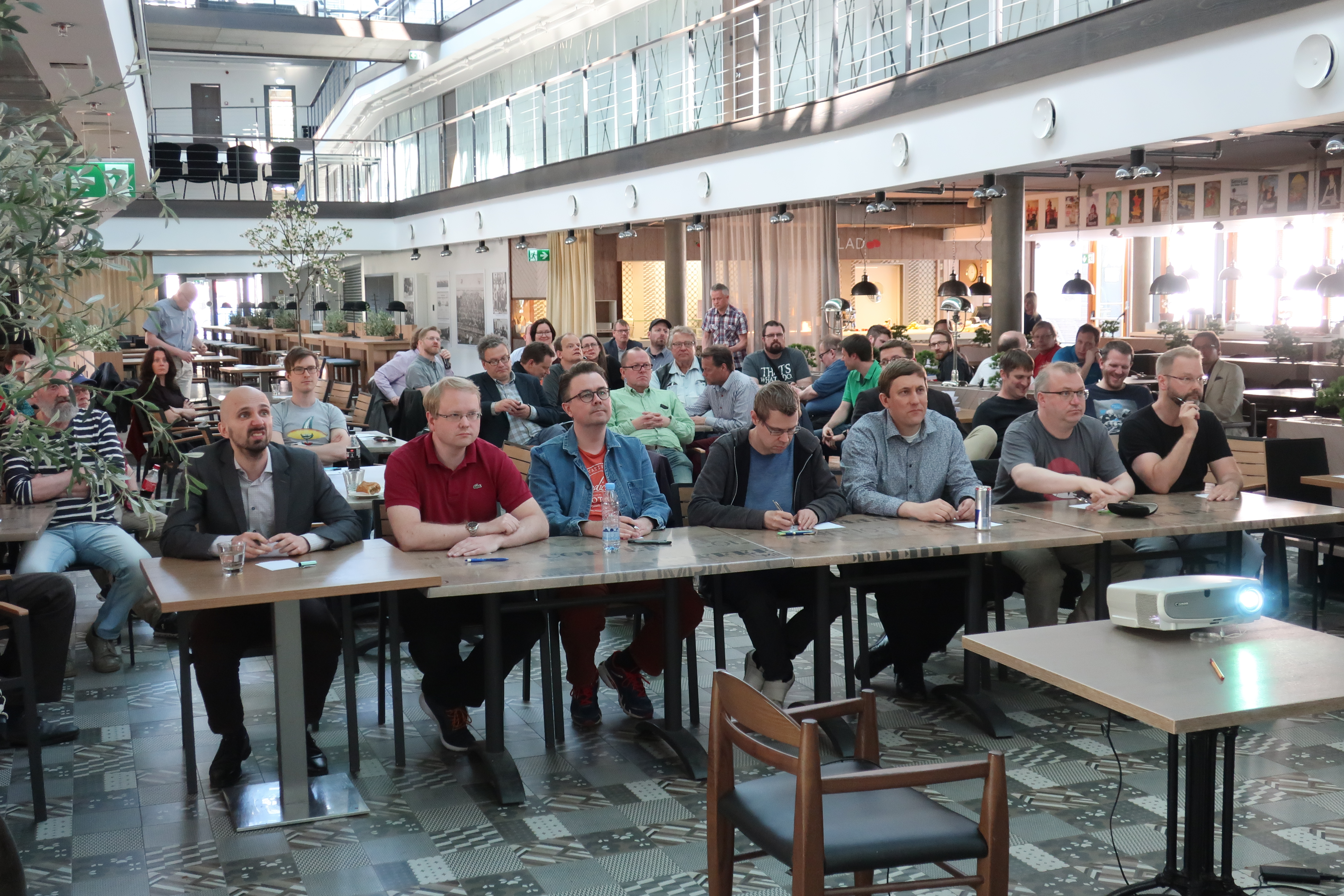
Finalists of the individual competition at the 2018 Nordic Quizzing Championships in Tallinn, Estonia

The Nordic Quizzing Championships is a bi-annual quiz event in the Nordic and Baltic countries. Top quizzers from Denmark, Sweden, Norway, Finland, Iceland, Faroe Islands, Greenland, Åland, Estonia, Latvia, and Lithuania are invited.

The event includes three different competitions: An Individual Competition, a Team Competition, and a Pairs Competition.

International Quizzing Association delegates from Estonia, Finland and Norway, meeting at the European Quizzing Championships in Blackpool in November 2007, began talks with a view to instituting a Nordic Championships. The first event was hosted by Tallinn, Estonia in 2008. In 2010 the competition was in Turku, Finland. The 2012 championships took place in Copenhagen, Denmark. In 2015 the competition was held in Oslo, Norway following a 3-year break. In 2018 the championships took place in Tallinn, Estonia.

== Results ==
=== 2008: Tallinn ===
10 May 2008.

Competition	Winner	Runner-up	Third place
Singles	(Finland) Tero Kalliolevo	(Norway) Ole Martin Halck	(Norway) Thomas Kolåsæter
Pairs	(Finland) Tero Kalliolevo (Finland) Jussi Suvanto	(Norway) Ole Martin Halck (Norway) Harald Aastorp	(Norway) Øystein Aadnevik (Norway) Dag Fjeldstad
Teams	(Finland) Tero Kalliolevo (Finland) Jussi Suvanto (Finland) Jari-Pekka Vuorela (Finland) Tuomas Tumi	(Norway) Dag Fjeldstad (Norway) Harald Aastorp (Norway) Lars Heggland (Norway) Knut Heggland	(Norway) Tore Dahl (Norway) Trine Aalborg (Norway) Thomas Kolåsæter (Norway) Ole Martin Halck

=== 2010: Turku ===
22 and 23 May 2010.

Competition	Winner	Runner-up	Third place
Singles	(Finland) Tero Kalliolevo	(Norway) Tore Dahl	(Norway) Harald Aastorp
Pairs	(Finland) Tero Kalliolevo (Finland) Tuomas Tumi	(Norway) Tore Dahl (Norway) Ole Martin Halck	(Norway) Knut Heggland (Norway) Lars Heggland
Teams	(Finland) Tero Kalliolevo (Finland) Tuomas Tumi (Finland) Jari-Pekka Vuorela (Finland) Jari Hynninen	(Norway) Sigve Sørland (Norway) Harald Aastorp (Norway) Stig Sanner (Norway) Lars Heggland	(Norway) Tore Dahl (Norway) Jon Strøm (Norway) Thomas Kolåsæter (Norway) Knut Heggland

=== 2012: Copenhagen ===
19 and 20 May 2012.

Competition	Winner	Runner-up	Third place
Singles	(Finland) Tero Kalliolevo	(Norway) Thomas Kolåsæter	(Norway) Harald Aastorp
Pairs	(Finland) Tero Kalliolevo (Finland) Tuomas Tumi	(Estonia) Ove Põder (Estonia) Tauno Vahter	(Norway) Thomas Kolåsæter (Norway) Tore Dahl
Teams	(Norway) Thomas Kolåsæter (Norway) Ole Martin Halck (Norway) Lars Heggland (Norway) Tore Dahl	(Estonia) Ove Põder (Estonia) Igor Habal (Estonia) Arko Olesk (Estonia) Tauno Vahter	(Norway) Harald Aastorp (Norway) Ingrid Sande Larsen (Norway) Stig Sanner (Norway) Geir Kristiansen

=== 2015: Oslo ===
25 and 26 April 2015.

Competition	Winner	Runner-up	Third place
Singles	(Norway) Thomas Kolåsæter	(Estonia) Ove Põder	(Finland) Tero Kalliolevo
Pairs	(Finland) Tero Kalliolevo (Finland) Jussi Suvanto	(Norway) Tore Dahl (Norway) Thomas Kolåsæter	(Norway) Ole Martin Halck (Norway) Harald Aastorp
Teams	(Norway) Thomas Kolåsæter (Norway) Ole Martin Halck (Norway) Geir Kristiansen (Norway) Harald Aastorp	(Norway) Arne Blakkisrud (Norway) Lars Heggland (Norway) Knut Heggland (Norway) Stig Sanner	(Finland) Jari Hakalax (Finland) Tero Kalliolevo (Finland) Jussi Suvanto (Finland) Tuomas Tumi

=== 2018: Tallinn ===
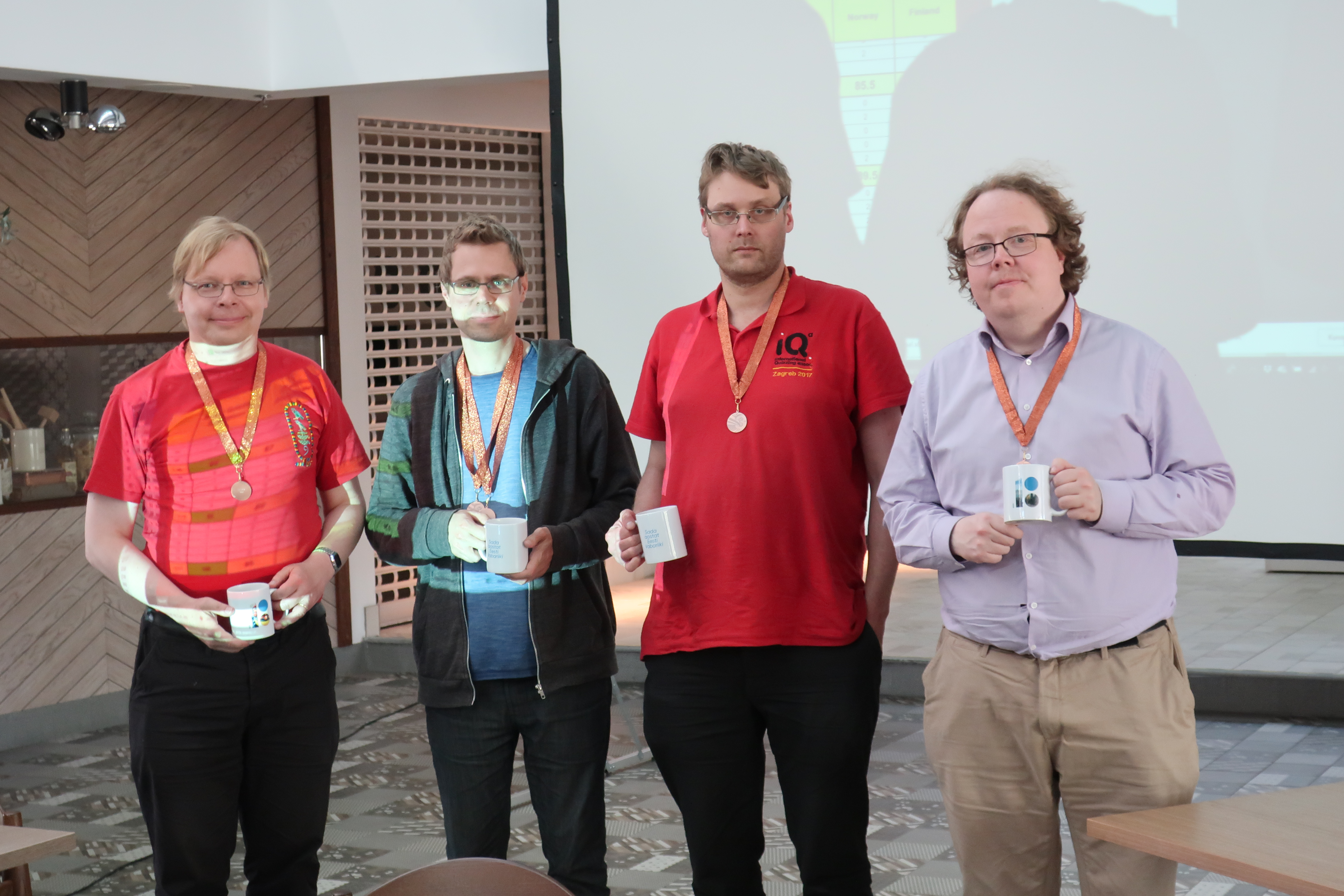
The Finnish bronze medalists at the 2018 team competition (left to right: Markku Virtanen, Tero Kalliolevo, Tuomas Tumi, Jussi Suvanto)

19 and 20 May 2018.

Competition	Winner	Runner-up	Third place
Singles	(Estonia) Igor Habal	(Norway) Ole Martin Halck	(Finland) Tero Kalliolevo
Pairs	(Estonia) Igor Habal (Estonia) Kaarel Silmato	(Norway) Tore Dahl (Norway) Thomas Kolåsæter	(Estonia) Ove Põder (Estonia) Tauno Vahter
Teams	(Estonia) Igor Habal (Estonia) Ove Põder (Estonia) Kaarel Silmato (Estonia) Tauno Vahter	(Norway) Thomas Kolåsæter (Norway) Lars Heggland (Norway) Tore Dahl (Norway) Geir Kristiansen	(Finland) Markku Virtanen (Finland) Tero Kalliolevo (Finland) Jussi Suvanto (Finland) Tuomas Tumi
