= Alexander Bommes =

German television presenter

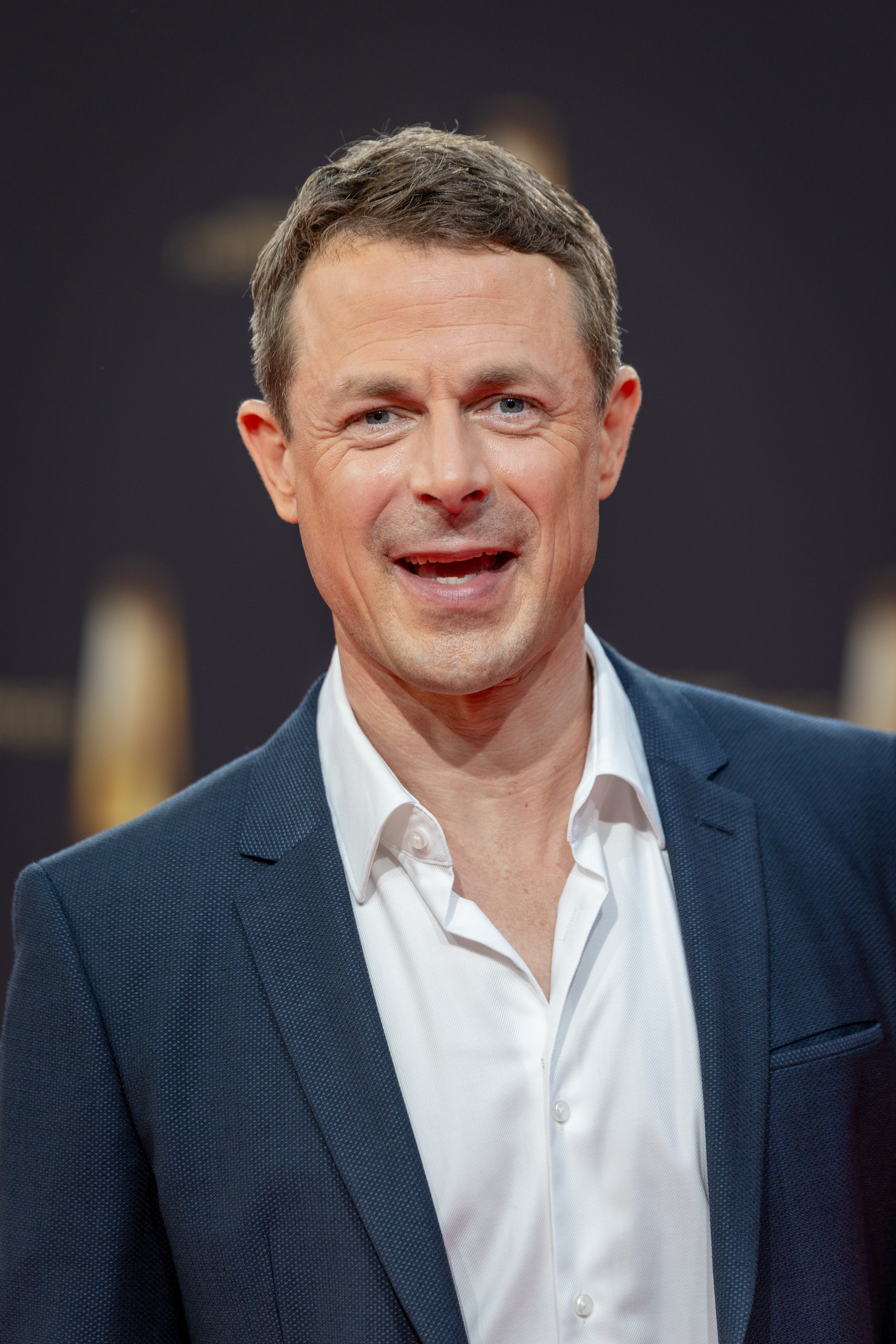
- Bommes in 2023
- Born: January 21, 1976 (age 50); Kiel, West Germany
- Occupations: Television Host, Sports Journalist, Former Handball Player
- Years active: c. 1999–2003 (Handball)
- Known for: Host and Sports Journalist for German broadcasters*NDR and **ARD
- Television: NDR, ARD
- Partner: Julia Westlake
- Children: 2

Alexander Bommes (born 21 January 1976 in Kiel) is a German television host. He works as a host and sports journalist on German broadcasters NDR and ARD.

Bommes originally played handball for TSV Bayer Dormagen from 1999 to 2001 and for VfL Gummersbach from 2001 to 2003 in the Handball-Bundesliga. He has two sons with television host Julia Westlake.

== Television ==
=== As host ===
- since 2009: Sportclub, NDR
- since 2011: Sportschau am Sonntag, Das Erste
- since 2012: Gefragt – Gejagt, NDR, Das Erste since 18 May 2015
- since 2013: Sportschau Club, Das Erste
- since 2015: Tietjen und Bommes, NDR
- since 2015: Sportschau live: Fußball, Das Erste
- since 2015: Sportschau am Samstag, Das Erste
- 2008–2014: Hamburg Journal, NDR
- 2008: Wahlberichterstattung Hamburg, NDR
- 2009: Liga 3 – Fußball, NDR
- 2009: Liga 1 – Handball, NDR
- 2009: Stadt gegen Land – Das Wissensduell, NDR
- 2009–2011: Hafengeburtstag Hamburg, NDR
- 2011–2013: Top Flops – Die lustigsten Fernsehpannen, NDR
- 2012: Olympische Sommerspiele 2012, Telegramm host, Das Erste
- 2012: Sommer-Paralympics 2012, Main host, Das Erste
- 2012: Deutsche Leichtathletik-Meisterschaften 2012, Das Erste
- 2013–2014: NDR-Quizshow, NDR
- 2013–2014: Boxen im Ersten, Das Erste
- 2014: Olympische Winterspiele 2014, Telegramm host, Das Erste
- 2014: Fußball-Weltmeisterschaft 2014, WM Club host, Das Erste
- 2014: Deutschland feiert die Weltmeister, Das Erste and ZDF
- 2016: Super, Jungs! – Empfang der Handball-Nationalmannschaft in Berlin, Das Erste
- 2016: Olympische Sommerspiele 2016, Das Erste
- 2016: Bambi (award show), Das Erste

=== As interviewer ===
- 2011: 2011 World Championships in Athletics, Das Erste
- 2011: 2011 FIFA Women's World Cup, Das Erste
- 2012: 2012 European Men's Handball Championship, Das Erste
- 2012: 2012 European Athletics Championships, Das Erste
- 2013: 2013 World Men's Handball Championship, Das Erste
- 2013: 2013 World Championships in Athletics, Das Erste
