= Margrietha Voskuilen =

Dutch curler

Margrietha Voskuilen (born 5 September 1960, Huizen) is a Dutch curler from the Curling Club Utrecht. She currently plays third for the Dutch national team.

She made her international debut in 1995 as a lead for Mirjam Boymans-Gast's 16th place team at the European Curling Championships. Two years later, she was an alternate for Beatrice Miltenburg's 12th place team. In 1999, Voskuilen had moved up to third, for Marie José Tiemstra, and they finished in 13th place. In 2001 and 2002, Voskuilen skipped the Dutch team at the European Championships, and finished 13th and 16th respectively. In 2004, Voskuilen played in the second position for Shari Leibbrandt-Demmon, and they finished 12th, meaning promotion to the A Division. In 2005 they finished in 7th position and were awarded a place into the 2006 Ford World Women's Curling Championship where they finished in the last position. The team currently participates at the 2006 European Curling Championships.
