= Sebastian Jacoby =

German quiz player

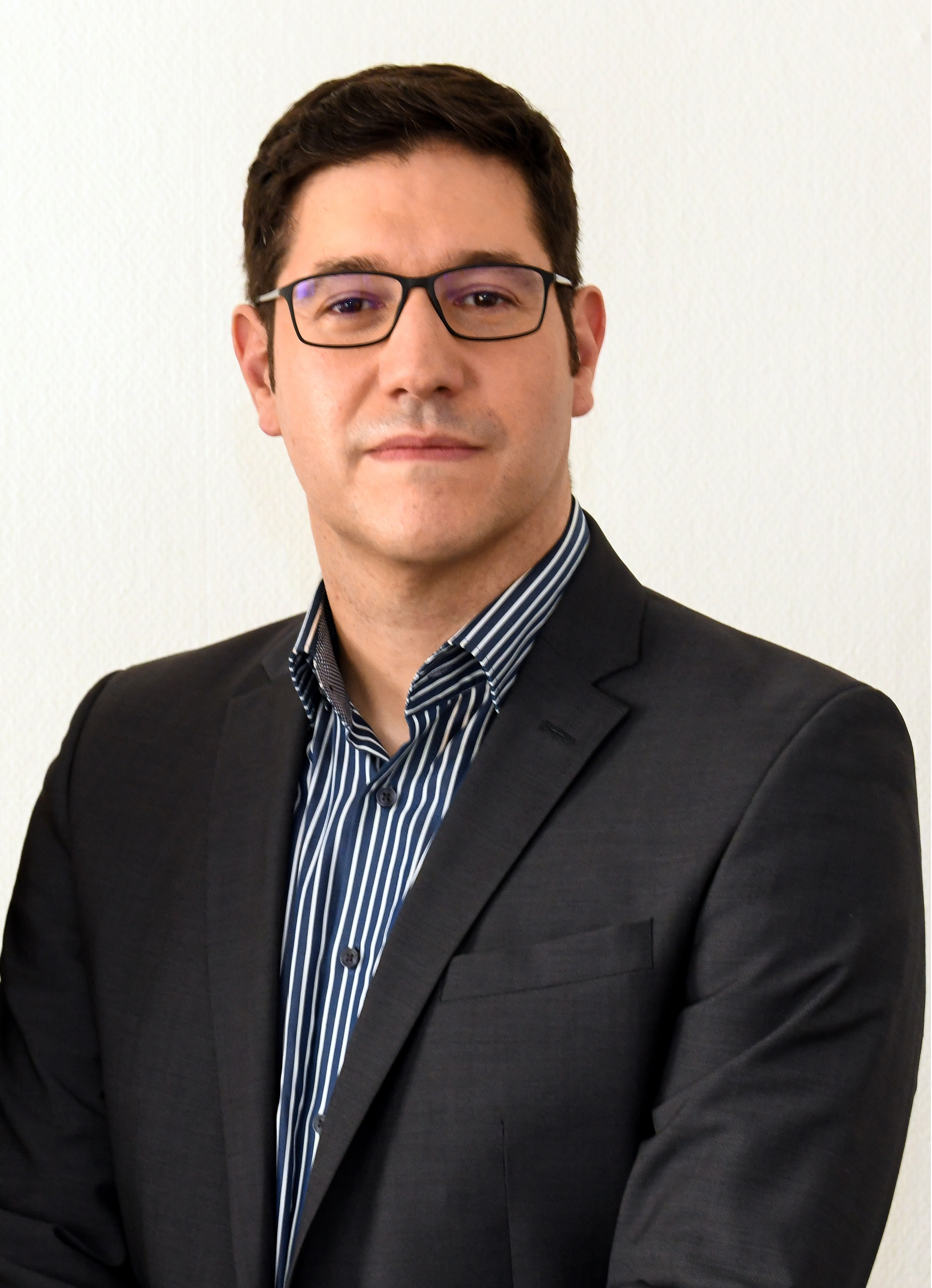
- Jacoby in 2019
- Born: Sebastian Peter Heinz Alexander Jacoby; April 8, 1978 (age 48); Oberstdorf, Bavaria, West Germany
- Other name: "Der Quizgott" (The Quizzing God)
- Education: University of Duisburg-Essen
- Occupations: Quizzer; television personality; curler
- Known for: Gefragt – Gejagt
- Children: 1
- Website: sebastianjacoby.de

Sebastian Peter Heinz Alexander Jacoby (born 8 April 1978) is a German quiz player, television personality and former curler. He won gold in the 2008 European Mixed Curling Championship. Since 2013, he has appeared as one of the "chasers" on Gefragt – Gejagt, the German adaptation of The Chase.

== Early life and education ==
A native of Oberstdorf, Bavaria, Jacoby graduated from school with the Abitur in 1997 and spent his mandatory military service at a Bundeswehr sports group in Sonthofen. After an apprenticeship at ThyssenKrupp in Duisburg from 1998 to 2001, he studied economics at the University of Duisburg-Essen and Arkansas State University.

== Career ==
=== Curling ===
Jacoby competed for Germany in three World Junior Curling Championships on a team led by Sebastian Stock, winning bronze at the 1996 championships in Red Deer, Alberta.

From 2007 to 2009, he represented Germany in three European Mixed Curling Championships, where he played as a second. Led by Rainer Schöpp, the team won bronze at the 2007 championship in Madrid and gold at the 2008 championship in Kitzbühel. He appeared a fourth time at the 2014 championship.

=== Quizzing and television career ===
Jacoby started his quizzing career at a pub quiz in an Irish pub, which opened in his home town, Oberstdorf, in 1996. Later, he created and presented several pub quizzes in the Duisburg area.

In 2011, he was a founding member of the Deutscher Quiz-Verein (German Quizzing Association). He continues to be one of the leading quiz championship players in Germany, having won the individual competition at the German Quizzing Championships at their inaugural edition in 2012, in 2014, and in 2024. He also has represented Germany as part of their national team at several European Quizzing Championships.

In April 2012, Jacoby won the first edition of the ZDF TV show Der Super-Champion (now Der Quiz-Champion), winning €500,000.

Since 2013, he has appeared as one of the "chasers" (Jäger) on Gefragt – Gejagt, the German adaptation of the British game show The Chase, where he is known as "Der Quizgott" (The Quizzing God).

== Personal life ==
Jacoby lives in Duisburg. He is married and has a son.

Since 2008, Jacoby has worked as a controller at ThyssenKrupp.
