= University Challenge 2011–12 =

Series 41 of University Challenge began on 4 July 2011, and aired on BBC Two. Below is a list of the matches played with their scores and outcomes.

== Results ==
- Winning teams are highlighted in **bold**.
- Teams with green scores (winners) returned in the next round, while those with red scores (losers) were eliminated.
- Teams with orange scores must win one more match to return in the next round (current highest scoring losers, teams that won their first quarter final match, teams that won their second quarter final match having lost their first, or teams that won their first quarter final match and lost their second).
- Teams with yellow scores indicate that two further matches must be played and won (teams that lost their first quarter final match).
- A score in italics indicates a match decided on a tie-breaker question.

=== First round ===
Team 1	Score		Team 2	Total	Broadcast Date
**University of Warwick**	220	125	University of Edinburgh	345	4 July 2011
Trinity College, Cambridge	105	225	**University of Birmingham**	330	11 July 2011
Worcester College, Oxford	180	190	**Clare College, Cambridge**	370	18 July 2011
Queen's University, Belfast	85	235	**Newcastle University**	320	25 July 2011
Homerton College, Cambridge	200	205	**Balliol College, Oxford**	405	1 August 2011
**Christ Church, Oxford**	270	105	University of Bath	375	8 August 2011
University of Plymouth	45	325	**University of Durham**	370	15 August 2011
University of St Andrews	165	195	**Merton College, Oxford**	360	22 August 2011
**University of Manchester**	255	70	Selwyn College, Cambridge	325	29 August 2011
**University College London**	185	105	University of York	290	5 September 2011
King's College, Cambridge	95	280	**Queen's College, Oxford**	375	12 September 2011
**University of Leeds**	220	115	Goldsmiths, University of London	335	19 September 2011
St Anne's College, Oxford	140	205	**Pembroke College, Cambridge**	345	26 September 2011
London School of Hygiene & Tropical Medicine	155	215	**University of Nottingham**	370	3 October 2011

==== Highest Scoring Losers play-offs ====
Team 1	Score		Team 2	Total	Broadcast Date
London School of Hygiene & Tropical Medicine	115	190	**Homerton College, Cambridge**	305	10 October 2011
University of St Andrews	110	250	**Worcester College, Oxford**	360	17 October 2011

=== Second round ===
Team 1	Score		Team 2	Total	Broadcast Date
University of Leeds	65	320	**Clare College, Cambridge**	385	24 October 2011
University of Birmingham	80	220	**Newcastle University**	300	31 October 2011
University of Durham	190	245	**Homerton College, Cambridge**	435	7 November 2011
Queen's College, Oxford	185	200	**Worcester College, Oxford**	385	14 November 2011
Christ Church, Oxford	155	215	**University of Manchester**	370	21 November 2011
**University College London**	220	150	University of Warwick	370	28 November 2011
Merton College, Oxford	160	170	**Balliol College, Oxford**	330	5 December 2011
**Pembroke College, Cambridge**	280	125	University of Nottingham	405	12 December 2011

=== Quarter-finals ===
Team 1	Score		Team 2	Total	Broadcast Date
University of Manchester	125	195	**University College London**	320	19 December 2011
Balliol College, Oxford	160	240	**Pembroke College, Cambridge**	400	2 January 2012
**Worcester College, Oxford**	190	150	Newcastle University	340	9 January 2012
**Clare College, Cambridge**	170	145	Homerton College, Cambridge	315	16 January 2012
University College London	120	170	**Worcester College, Oxford**	290	23 January 2012
**University of Manchester**	330	95	Newcastle University	425	30 January 2012
**Pembroke College, Cambridge**	250	175	Clare College, Cambridge	425	6 February 2012
**Balliol College, Oxford**	170	145	Homerton College, Cambridge	315	13 February 2012
**University of Manchester**	270	250	Clare College, Cambridge	520	20 February 2012
**University College London**	235	145	Balliol College, Oxford	380	27 February 2012

=== Semi-finals ===
Team 1	Score		Team 2	Total	Broadcast Date
Worcester College, Oxford	65	240	**University of Manchester**	305	5 March 2012
**Pembroke College, Cambridge**	185	125	University College London	310	12 March 2012

=== Final ===
Team 1	Score		Team 2	Total	Broadcast Date
**University of Manchester**	180	135	Pembroke College, Cambridge	315	19 March 2012

- The trophy and title were awarded to the Manchester team of Luke Kelly, Michael McKenna, Tristan Burke, and Paul Joyce.
- The trophy was presented by Camilla, Duchess of Cornwall at Clarence House.

== Spin-off: Christmas Special 2011 ==
Starting this year, a Christmas special sequence was aired featuring distinguished alumni. Out of 5 first-round winners, the top 4 highest-scoring teams progress to the semi-finals. The teams consist of celebrities who represent their alma maters.

=== Results ===
- Winning teams are highlighted in **bold**.
- Teams with green scores (winners) returned in the next round, while those with red scores (losers) were eliminated.
- Teams with grey scores won their match but did not achieve a high enough score to proceed to the next round.
- A score in italics indicates a match decided on a tie-breaker question.

First Round

Team 1	Score		Team 2	Total	Broadcast date
University of York	120	125	**University of Manchester**	245	19 December 2011
Durham University	60	135	**University of Edinburgh**	195	20 December 2011
**Magdalen College, Oxford**	130	85	University College London	215	21 December 2011
**University of Warwick**	225	50	University of Sheffield	275	22 December 2011
**Trinity College, Cambridge**	225	80	University of St Andrews	305	24 December 2011

==== Standings for the winners ====
Rank	Team	Team captain	Score
1=	University of Warwick	Christian Wolmar	225
1=	Trinity College, Cambridge	John Lloyd	225
3	University of Edinburgh	Sally Magnusson	135
4	Magdalen College, Oxford	Alan Hollinghurst	130
5	University of Manchester	Waldemar Januszczak	125

Semi-finals

Team 1	Score		Team 2	Total	Broadcast date
University of Edinburgh	35	265	**University of Warwick**	300	25 December 2011
Magdalen College, Oxford	105	160	**Trinity College, Cambridge**	265	26 December 2011

Final

Team 1	Score		Team 2	Total	Broadcast date
University of Warwick	60	235	**Trinity College, Cambridge**	280	27 December 2011

The Trinity College, Cambridge team of Robin Bhattacharyya, Daisy Goodwin, John Lloyd, and Edward Stourton beat the University of Warwick team of Vadim Jean, Daisy Christodoulou, Christian Wolmar and Carla Mendonça.
