= University Challenge =

British TV quiz (since 1962)

- Genre: Quiz show
- Based on: College Bowl by Don Reid
- Presented by: Bamber Gascoigne (1962–1987); Jeremy Paxman (1994–2023); Amol Rajan (2023–present)
- Announcer: Don Murray-Henderson; Jim Pope; Roger Tilling
- Theme music composer: Derek New
- Opening theme: "Ting A Ling" performed by Duke Ellington (1962–1963) "College Boy" performed by Derek New (1963–2000) the Balanescu Quartet (2000–present)
- Country of origin: United Kingdom
- Original language: English
- No. of series: 56
- No. of episodes: 1,792

Production
- Production locations: Granada Studios (1962–2013); Dock10 studios (2013–present)
- Running time: 30 minutes
- Production companies: Granada Television (1962–2009); ITV Studios Entertainment (2009–2020); Lifted Entertainment (2021–present)

Original release
- Network: ITV
- Release: 21 September 1962 – 31 December 1987
- Network: BBC Two
- Release: 28 December 1992 – present

Related
- College Bowl; University Challenge: The Professionals; The 3rd Degree; Christmas University Challenge

University Challenge is a British television quiz programme which first aired in 1962. University Challenge aired for 913 episodes on ITV from 21 September 1962 to 31 December 1987, presented by quizmaster Bamber Gascoigne. The BBC revived the programme on 21 September 1994, the programme's 32nd anniversary, with Jeremy Paxman as the quizmaster. Paxman relinquished his role as host following the conclusion of the 52nd series in 2023, and was succeeded by Amol Rajan.

The current title holders are the University of Manchester, who won a record equalling fifth title in the final of the 2025–26 series on 20 April 2026. On 21 April 2023, the BBC unveiled a new set and title card, which debuted on Rajan's first episode, aired on 17 July 2023.

The show has always been produced by the same company (originally named Granada Television, renamed ITV Studios in 2009 and renamed again Lifted Entertainment in 2021), under licence from Richard Reid Productions and the College Bowl Company. It was recorded at Granada Studios in Manchester from its inception until the studios closed in 2013; it is now recorded at Dock10 studios in Salford.

== History ==
=== Format continuity ===
Despite periodic changes to the sets, studio layout, and presentation, University Challenge has preserved a high level of continuity from 1962 to the present. Some commentators have cited this as an essential element of its success. Elements of this continuity include:

- The longevity of its quizmasters, with only three presenters in the programme's history;
- The split-screen presentation during the starter question phase, which appears to place one team physically above the other. In the final years of the original Bamber Gascoigne era, the studio set genuinely was two-tiered, although the split-screen effect returned for the revived series and has been used ever since;
- Long serving voiceover announcers, with only three in the programme's history – Don Murray-Henderson from 1962 until his death in 1971, then Jim Pope until his death in 2001, then Roger Tilling. Tilling's delivery typically becomes increasingly high-pitched as the episode progresses;
- The theme tune "College Boy" by Derek New, which has been with the series since the 1960s (although the first series used "Ting A Ling" by Duke Ellington). "College Boy" was originally scored for an ensemble of tubular bells, flugelhorn, harpsichord, brushed hi-hat, bass drum and double bass. The original theme returned for the early Paxman-era episodes and was later replaced by a string quartet arrangement of the theme recorded by the Balanescu Quartet.

=== ITV (1962 to 1987) ===
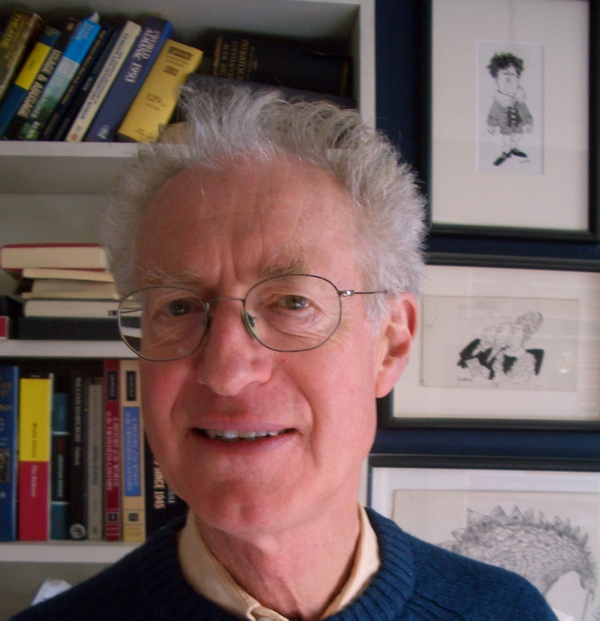
Bamber Gascoigne hosted the original series of University Challenge from 1962 to 1987 and the 1992 Granadaland special.

The programme had its beginnings in an American television quiz show called College Bowl. Cecil Bernstein, brother of Sidney Bernstein who founded Granada Television in 1954, had seen the programme in the United States and liked the format. It was decided that Granada would produce a similar programme with competing teams from universities across the United Kingdom. From its inception in 1962, University Challenge was hosted by Bamber Gascoigne, who died in 2022. The programme's first match was a match between the University of Leeds (featuring a pre-fame Ian Channell, better known as The Wizard of New Zealand) and the University of Reading. The show was a cult favourite with a small but loyal core audience, and was one of a select few ITV programmes that was transmitted without any advertising breaks. Originally, the series started off in many areas, being broadcast at peak times or just after the nightly news around 22:30; by the early 1970s, the series was relegated to irregular timeslots by the various ITV regional companies, with some broadcasting the show during daytime, at weekends or late at night. In the absence of a regular networked slot, audience figures would often fall, leading the producers to make changes to the long-standing format of the programme. LWT stopped broadcasting the show in October 1983, with Thames following suit shortly afterwards. Thames resumed screening the series in 1984 however they only screened the Quarter-finals To the final in December 1984, when it was networked for the first time.

The programme was not broadcast in 1985 and returned in April 1986, when it continued to networked by ITV and broadcast at 15:00 on weekdays. The gameplay was revised, initial games were staged over two legs; the first in the classic format and the second played as a relay, where contestants selected questions from specific categories such as sport, literature and science, passing a baton between players whenever a "lap" of two correct answers was scored. The final series was also networked, but broadcast around 11:00 during the summer holiday period. Even so, the new networked time did little to save the series. The last ITV series was broadcast in 1987.

The Universities of Oxford and Cambridge could each enter up to five of their constituent colleges as separate teams, which are not themselves universities: they have far fewer students – numbering in the hundreds rather than thousands – than most universities. This was one ostensible inspiration for a 1975 protest, in which a team from the University of Manchester (which included David Aaronovitch) came second to Downing College, Cambridge, when they started a round by answering every question "Che Guevara", "Marx", "Trotsky" or "Lenin", in the hope of making the resulting show unbroadcastable. It was, however, broadcast, although only portions of the episode still exist in the Granada Television archives. Granada subsequently banned the University of Manchester for several years.

=== BBC ===
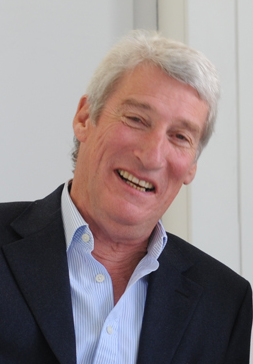
Jeremy Paxman hosted University Challenge from 1994 to 2023 and its Christmas spin-off from 2011 to 2022.

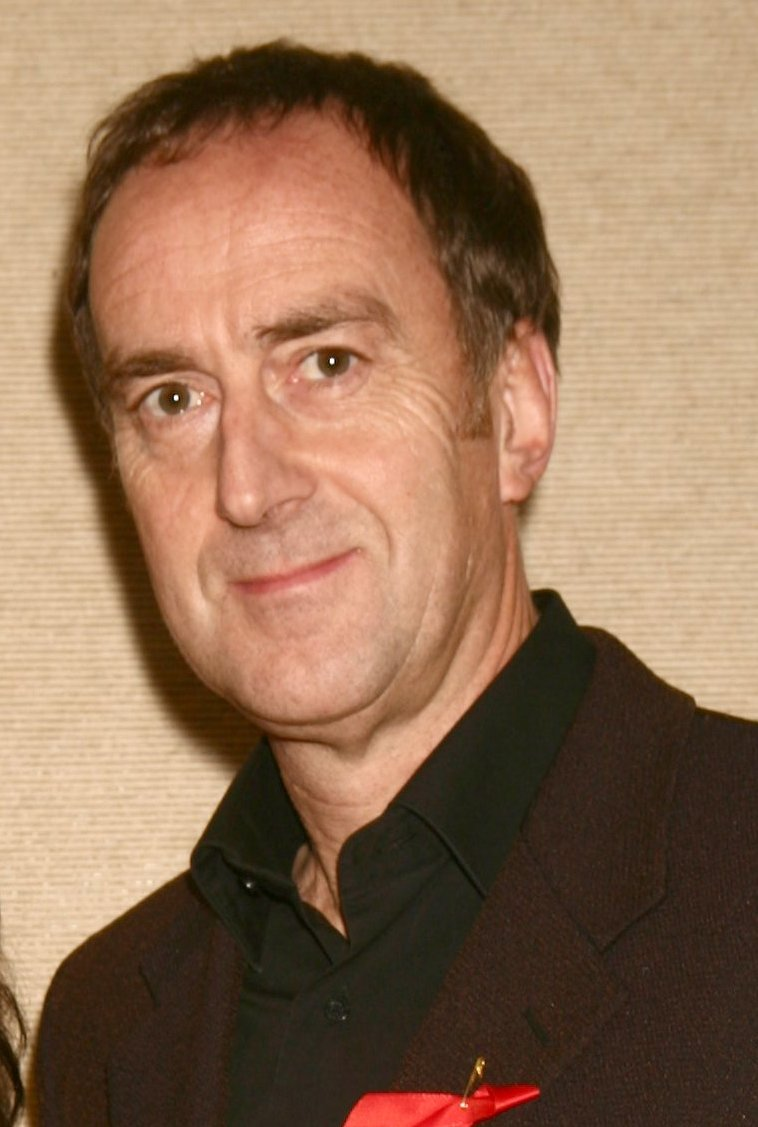
Angus Deayton hosted the 2003 and 2005 Comic Relief editions of University Challenge.

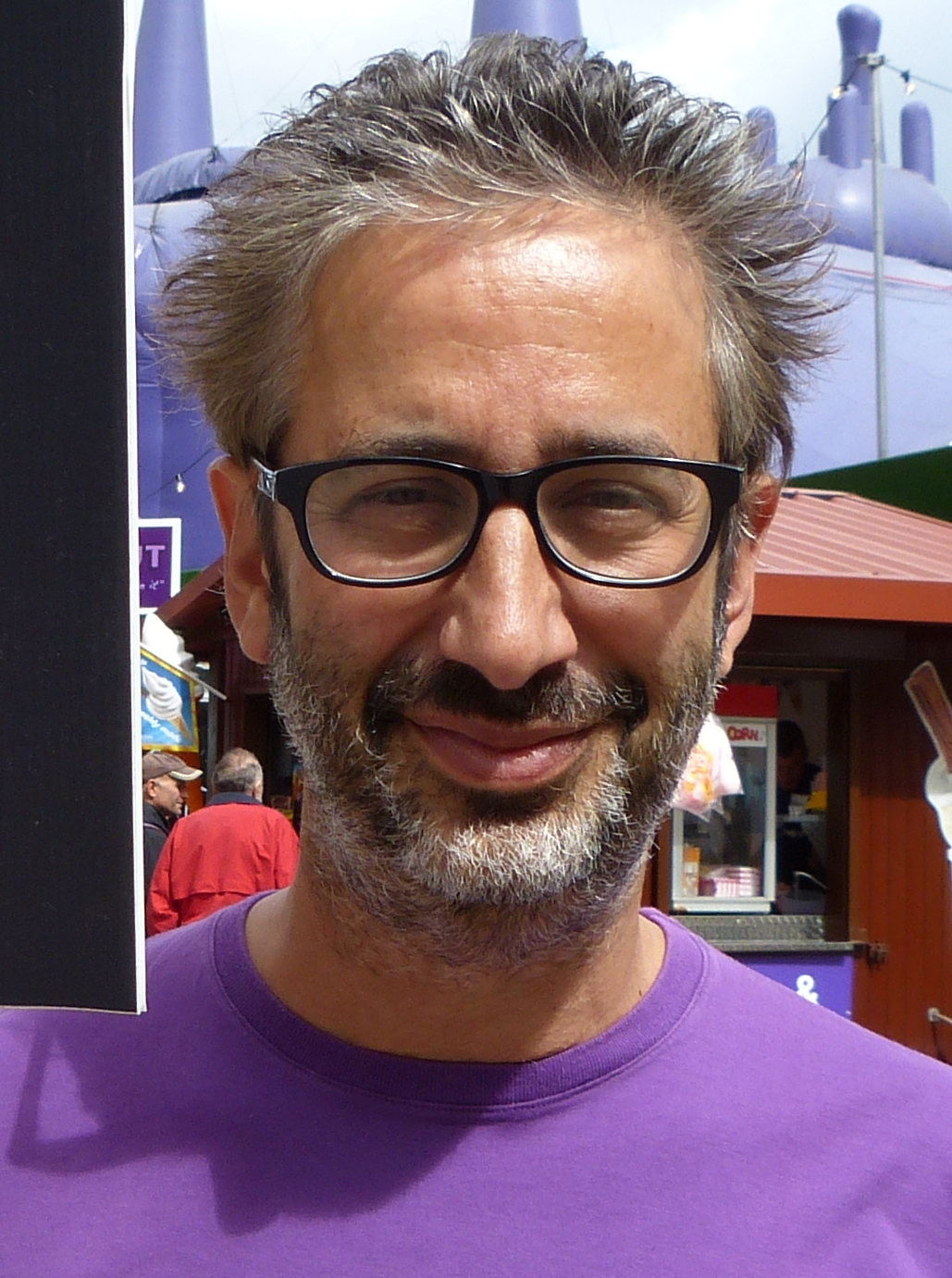
David Baddiel hosted the 2019 Comic Relief edition of University Challenge.

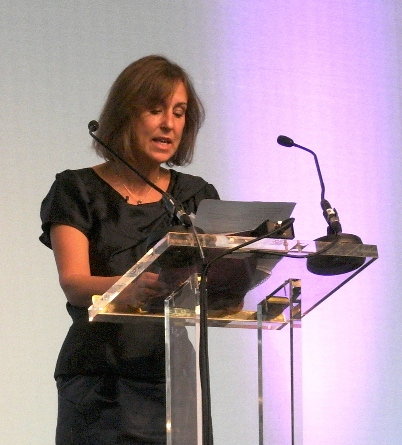
Kirsty Wark hosted the 2020 and 2021 Children in Need editions of University Challenge.

University Challenge was revived by the BBC in 1994, although still produced by Granada Television (branded since 2009 as ITV Studios), using the original format, with minor differences, and presented by Jeremy Paxman.

During the show's hiatus, a special edition of the show was made by the BBC, as part of a themed evening of programmes dedicated to Granada Television. It was presented by Bamber Gascoigne and broadcast on BBC2 on 28 December 1992. The teams included one of students from Keble College, Oxford, which had fielded the winning team in the final 1987 season, and a graduates team of celebrity alumni who had previously appeared on the programme as students, including journalist John Simpson and actor Stephen Fry. This show was preceded by a short documentary about the show's history. Bamber Gascoigne's final appearance as host was in Universe Challenge in 1998 (see below).

Paxman relinquished his role as host following the conclusion of the 52nd series in 2023, after which he was succeeded by Amol Rajan. In October 2022, an ITV documentary, Paxman: Putting Up With Parkinson's, explored how Parkinson's disease has impacted him and revealed that Paxman recorded his last episode of University Challenge on 15 October 2022, which aired on 29 May 2023.

On 21 April 2023, the BBC unveiled a new set and title card, which debuted on Rajan's first episode, which aired on 17 July 2023.

==== Postgraduates ====
Since its revival in 1994, the programme has featured a number of teams of postgraduate and mature students, whose participation has been criticised. The Open University won the 1999 series with a team with an average age of 46. In the quarter-final, they narrowly beat a slightly younger team from part-time and mature student specialist Birkbeck, University of London. Birkbeck won the competition in 2003, also with a substantially mature team. Host Jeremy Paxman said that the Open University team was "not in the spirit" of the competition. The team publicly replied by challenging him to specify in what way this was "contrary to the spirit of the quiz – or of the university".

==== Ineligible contestants ====
In 2009, Sam Kay, part of the team from Corpus Christi College, Oxford, was accused of not being a student when the show was filmed. Kay, who had completed a chemistry degree the previous summer, had been planning to go on to study for a Doctor of Philosophy, but dropped out as he did not have sufficient funding. He then became an accountant. The team, whose captain Gail Trimble was dubbed the "human Google", won the competition but was subsequently disqualified and the trophy awarded to the runners-up, the University of Manchester.

A few days later, it was also revealed that Charles Markland, a member of the 2008 winning team from Christ Church, Oxford, had transferred his studies to Balliol College halfway through the series. He said that his team captain had contacted a researcher concerning the situation, and had been told that this was not a problem and that the same team should be maintained for continuity purposes. It was also revealed that Freya McClements, captain of the 2004 winning team from Magdalen College, Oxford, was at the time studying at Trinity College, Dublin. Although it was mentioned in a BBC news story at the time, no action was taken because the BBC stated that the facts had not been brought to their attention.

==== Editing ====
In 2016, at the Henley Literary Festival, Jeremy Paxman said that, when students were unable to answer several consecutive starter questions, those questions were often deleted before the show is broadcast.

=== In popular culture ===
- In an episode of the BBC comedy series Not the Nine O'Clock News, first broadcast on 15 December 1980, Griff Rhys Jones plays Bamber Gascoigne in a sketch that pitches two teams of criminals representing prisoners from Wormwood Scrubs and Parkhurst. The teams score "points" (remission of sentence) by "grassing" on possible suspects involved in a crime.
- In 1984 an episode of The Young Ones, entitled "Bambi" (a play on Bamber Gascoigne's name), centred on a parody of University Challenge with a match between the fictitious teams of Scumbag College and Footlights College, Oxbridge. The cast included Stephen Fry, who participated in the real competition in 1980 while at Cambridge, and fellow alumni and Footlights members Emma Thompson and Hugh Laurie as part of the "Footlights College" team, and Griff Rhys Jones as the host. The teams are arranged physically one above the other, in a parody of the show's split-screen format.
- A quiz themed around BBC science fiction situation comedy Red Dwarf, broadcast in 1998, is entitled Universe Challenge. It opens as if it were a regular episode, but with Chris Barrie impersonating Jeremy Paxman. Gascoigne comes from behind with a blaster gun and blows him out of the chair to take over as host. This was Gascoigne's last appearance as host.
- In a list of the 100 Greatest British Television Programmes drawn up by the British Film Institute in 2000, voted for by industry professionals, University Challenge was placed 34th.
- Starter For Ten is the title of a novel, first published in 2003, by British author David Nicholls. The plot is about a first-year student, Brian Jackson, who attempts to join his university team competing in University Challenge. Nicholls also adapted the novel into the film Starter for 10 in 2006, starring James McAvoy as Jackson, with Mark Gatiss portraying Gascoigne.
- In 2006 Armando Ianucci's Time Trumpet presented a parody of University Challenge, set in a future where students are 'too lazy to learn'; this parody was later referenced in an episode of the 2007–08 series of University Challenge by the team captain of SOAS, Joe Perry, who, not knowing the real answer, simply answered "Venezuela?"
- The quiz was the subject of the hour-long BBC Two documentary The Story So Far, first broadcast in November 2006.
- In 2014, a two-part documentary narrated by Richard Osman called 'Class of 2014' outlined a brief history of the programme and the team selection process both within the universities and by the production staff. The documentary attracted some criticism due to the large emphasis on Oxbridge and Manchester during the programme.
- In March 2017 semi-finalist team captains Bobby Seagull of Emmanuel College, Cambridge, and Eric Monkman of Wolfson College, Cambridge, appeared on BBC One's The One Show. In August 2017 the two were featured on BBC Radio 4's Today programme ahead of hosting their own show, Monkman and Seagull's Polymathic Adventure, on 21 August.
- In 2024, Amol Rajan's reply "We need jungle, I’m afraid" was widely sampled by music producers, becoming a viral phenomenon.

== Gameplay ==
=== Teams ===
From a 2023 episode of University Challenge

Teams consist of four members and most represent a single university. The exceptions to this are colleges of the University of Oxford, the University of Cambridge, the University of London and formerly the University of Wales which enter independent teams. While a number of other British universities have constituent colleges, only those where some teaching is undertaken at the college level may enter independent teams. The competing teams each year are selected by the show's producers, based both on scores from a general trivia quiz and the producers' judging of the suitability of the teams for television. Oxford and Cambridge ("Oxbridge") colleges are prevalent in the competition: for instance, of the Christmas series between 2011 and 2022, Oxbridge colleges represented one-quarter of teams and three-quarters of winners.

The contestants are identified by their surnames during gameplay, apart from at the beginning when they introduce themselves with their full names, where they are from and what they are studying.

The teams generally consist of mixed genders, mostly young adults but with some mature students also appearing.

=== Tournament structure ===
The current tournament format used for each series is that of a direct knockout tournament starting with 28 teams. The fourteen first-round winners progress directly to the last sixteen. Two repechage matches, involving the four highest scoring losing teams from the first round, whose losing scores often exceed winning scores in other first-round matches, fill the remaining places in the last sixteen. Teams in the quarter-final round (last eight teams) have to win two matches in the round to progress to the semi-finals. Equally, teams must lose two quarter-final matches in order to be eliminated from that round. The pairings for matches are often chosen in order to keep stronger teams apart.

=== Question format ===
Each round begins with a starter question, which is worth ten points. The catchphrase "your starter for ten" inspired David Nicholls' 2003 novel Starter for Ten and the 2006 film based on it starring James McAvoy. Starter questions must be answered by individual contestants without conferring with their team. Only one contestant from each team may attempt to answer, and the first team to answer correctly receives the points. Contestants may interrupt the quizmaster with their answer, but if they are incorrect, they will incur a five-point penalty. During the ITV series this took the form of five points being awarded to the opposing team, whereas in the BBC series five points are deducted from the interrupting team.

The team answering a starter correctly gets a set of bonus questions worth a potential fifteen points, and they may confer before answering. Answers to bonus questions are given by the team captain, unless the captain nominates another team member using the phrase, "Nominate [name];" in that case, the named team member answers instead. The bonus questions in a set are thematically linked with each other, but they rarely share a connection with the preceding starter question except when they are bonuses following a picture or music question. Generally, there are three separate bonus questions worth five points each, but occasionally a bonus will require the enumeration of a given list with five, ten or fifteen points given for correctly giving a certain number of items from the list (for example, "there are seven fundamental SI units. Give five for five points, six for ten points or all seven for fifteen points").

In the course of a game there are two picture rounds, occurring roughly one quarter and three-quarters of the way through, and one music round occurring roughly at the half-way point. The bonus questions in a picture or music round are thematically connected to the starter question, though if neither team correctly answers the starter, the accompanying bonuses are held back and used after a normal starter is correctly answered. Usually, in the recent contests, the first picture round focuses on science and technology, geography, and languages, while the second picture round focuses on art, film, television, and literature. Pieces of music played for the music round may be classical or popular – for example, on 25 July 2011, the pieces played were winners of the Eurovision Song Contest. Occasionally, audio clips other than music (e.g. speech, animal sounds or other field recordings) are used. The 2010 Manchester University team included a visually impaired student, Rachael Neiman, and the picture rounds in episodes involving the team were word puzzles for which she was provided with Braille transcriptions. In the 7th episode of the 2024 Christmas series, three audio rounds replaced the usual picture rounds to accommodate two visually impaired participants, Jamie MacDonald and Halima Begum. These audio rounds included identifying bird songs, depictions of snow in classical music and songs featured on the 1974 Pazz & Jop list.

The pace of questioning gradually increases through the show. The sound of a gong signals the end of the game. At this point, the game immediately ends, even if the quizmaster is halfway through asking a question. In the event of a tied score at the sound of the gong, a sudden death question is asked, the first team to answer correctly being deemed the winner; this is repeated until a team either gives a correct answer to a question or is deducted five points for an incorrect interruption to a question. The ending of the programme is usually signified with the quizmaster saying, "It's goodbye from ([name of losing team], who say goodbye), it's goodbye from ([name of winning team], likewise), and it's goodbye from me: goodbye!" Afterwards, during the closing credits Rajan sometimes walks over and confers with the losing team.

=== Production ===
While the starter questions are being read out, the teams are shown on screen one above the other by means of a split-screen effect. When a player buzzes in, the shot zooms in to that player, accompanied by a voiceover identifying the player by team and surname, for example "Nottingham, Munro". The voiceovers are performed live in the studio by Roger Tilling and become more energetic towards the end of the programme. The 1986 series experimented with an actual two-tier set, which was discontinued the following year.

== Notable contestants ==
Pro-Celebrity edition, 1992.

Notable contestants in this section refers to the regular student competition; Special Celebrity Christmas editions, where all competitors are distinguished, are excluded.

=== Entertainers ===
- Stephen Fry – Queens' College, Cambridge, 1980
- Clive James – Pembroke College, Cambridge, 1968
- Miriam Margolyes – Newnham College, Cambridge, 1963
- John Sessions – reserve for UCNW Bangor, 1973
- June Tabor – St Hugh's College, Oxford, 1968
- The Wizard of New Zealand (Ian Brackenbury Channell) – University of Leeds, 1963

=== Authors ===
- Sebastian Faulks – Emmanuel College, Cambridge, 1972
- Julian Fellowes – Magdalene College, Cambridge, 1969
- David Starkey – Fitzwilliam College, Cambridge

=== Politicians ===
- Aaron Bell – St John's College, Oxford, 2001
- Tim Boswell – New College, Oxford
- Damian Collins – St Benet's Hall, Oxford, 1995
- Kwasi Kwarteng – Trinity College, Cambridge, 1995
- David Lidington – Sidney Sussex College, Cambridge, 1978
- David Mellor – Christ's College, Cambridge
- Malcolm Rifkind – University of Edinburgh, 1967
- Mary Robinson – Trinity College Dublin, 1966

=== Journalists ===
- David Aaronovitch – Victoria University of Manchester, 1975
- John Authers – University College, Oxford, 1987
- Christopher Hitchens – Balliol College, Oxford, 1968
- Charles Moore – Trinity College, Cambridge, 1978
- John Simpson – Magdalene College, Cambridge, 1964
- Josh Spero – Magdalen College, Oxford, 2004
- Jim Waterson – Jesus College, Oxford, 2010

=== Others ===
- Brandon Blackwell (Quizzer / TV personality) – Imperial College London, 2020
- Daisy Christodoulou (Teacher / Education campaigner) – University of Warwick, 2007
- Patrick Finglass (Academic) – St John's College, Oxford, 2001
- Sarah Healey (Civil Servant) – Magdalen College, Oxford, 1998
- Mark Labbett (Quizzer / TV personality) – University of Glamorgan, 1997
- Eric Monkman (Academic / TV presenter) – Wolfson College, Cambridge, 2017
- Mark Pallen (Academic) – Imperial College London, 1996
- Jenny Ryan (Quizzer / TV personality) – University of Leeds, 2003
- Bobby Seagull (Teacher / TV presenter) – Emmanuel College, Cambridge, 2017
- Dorjana Širola (Quizzer) – Somerville College, Oxford, 2002
- Michael Taylor (Historian) – Gonville and Caius College, Cambridge, 2015
- Gail Trimble (Academic) – Corpus Christi College, Oxford, 2009

== Winners ==
Imperial College London and the University of Manchester hold the record for most wins, with five each (though Manchester's 2009 win came only after the original winners were disqualified). Magdalen College, Oxford are third with four wins; they and Manchester are the only teams to successfully defend the title. Trinity College, Cambridge and Durham University hold three titles, and a further six institutions have two titles: the University of Sussex, the Open University, Sidney Sussex College, Cambridge, Keble College, Oxford, University College, Oxford and the University of Warwick. At the time of Magdalen College, Oxford's third win in 2004, no other institution had won more than twice; the trophy in use since 1994 was given to the college in perpetuity and a new one was created for use from 2005.

=== ITV series ===
Year	Winners	Runners-up
1963	University of Leicester	Balliol College, Oxford
1965	New College, Oxford	Worcester College, Oxford
1966	Oriel College, Oxford	University of Birmingham
1967	University of Sussex	King's College London
1968	Keele University	Jesus College, Cambridge
1969	University of Sussex (2)	University of Essex
1970	Churchill College, Cambridge	Christ's College, Cambridge
1971	Sidney Sussex College, Cambridge	Trinity College, Oxford
1972	University College, Oxford	Keble College, Oxford
1973	Fitzwilliam College, Cambridge	Gonville and Caius College, Cambridge
1974	Trinity College, Cambridge	Balliol College, Oxford
1975	Keble College, Oxford	University of Hull
1976	University College, Oxford (2)	King's College London
1977	Durham University	New College, Oxford
1978	Sidney Sussex College, Cambridge (2)	Magdalene College, Cambridge
1979	University of Bradford	Lancaster University
1980	Merton College, Oxford	Queens' College, Cambridge
1981	Queen's University Belfast	University of Edinburgh
1982	University of St Andrews	University College, Oxford
1983	University of Dundee	Durham University
1984	The Open University	University of St Andrews
1986	Jesus College, Oxford	Imperial College London
1987	Keble College, Oxford (2)	University College, Oxford

=== BBC series ===
Year	Winners	Runners-up
1995	Trinity College, Cambridge (2)	New College, Oxford
1996	Imperial College London	London School of Economics
1997	Magdalen College, Oxford	The Open University
1998	Magdalen College, Oxford (2)	Birkbeck, University of London
1999	The Open University (2)	Oriel College, Oxford
2000	University of Durham (2)	Oriel College, Oxford
2001	Imperial College London (2)	St John's College, Oxford
2002	Somerville College, Oxford	Imperial College London
2003	Birkbeck, University of London	Cranfield University
2004	Magdalen College, Oxford (3)	Gonville and Caius College, Cambridge
2005	Corpus Christi College, Oxford	University College London
2006	University of Manchester	Trinity Hall, Cambridge
2007	University of Warwick	University of Manchester
2008	Christ Church, Oxford	University of Sheffield
2009	University of Manchester (2)	Corpus Christi College, Oxford (Disqualified)
2010	Emmanuel College, Cambridge	St John's College, Oxford
2011	Magdalen College, Oxford (4)	University of York
2012	University of Manchester (3)	Pembroke College, Cambridge
2013	University of Manchester (4)	University College London
2014	Trinity College, Cambridge (3)	Somerville College, Oxford
2015	Gonville and Caius College, Cambridge	Magdalen College, Oxford
2016	Peterhouse, Cambridge	St John's College, Oxford
2017	Balliol College, Oxford	Wolfson College, Cambridge
2018	St John's College, Cambridge	Merton College, Oxford
2019	University of Edinburgh	St Edmund Hall, Oxford
2020	Imperial College London (3)	Corpus Christi College, Cambridge
2021	University of Warwick (2)	Magdalene College, Cambridge
2022	Imperial College London (4)	University of Reading
2023	University of Durham (3)	University of Bristol
2024	Imperial College London (5)	University College London
2025	Christ's College, Cambridge	University of Warwick
2026	University of Manchester (5)	University of Edinburgh

=== Most series wins ===
Rank	University/College	Number of wins	Win years
1	Imperial College London	5	1996, 2001, 2020, 2022, 2024
1	University of Manchester	5	2006, 2009, 2012, 2013, 2026
3	Magdalen College, Oxford	4	1997, 1998, 2004, 2011
4	Trinity College, Cambridge	3	1974, 1995, 2014
4	Durham University	3	1977, 2000, 2023
6	University of Sussex	2	1967, 1969
6	University College, Oxford	2	1972, 1976
6	Keble College, Oxford	2	1975, 1987
6	Sidney Sussex College, Cambridge	2	1971, 1978
6	The Open University	2	1984, 1999
6	University of Warwick	2	2007, 2021

Information in these tables obtained from Blanchflower – University Challenge Series Champions.

=== Lowest scores ===
Little is known about the lowest scores from the Bamber Gascoigne series, except that the lowest score ever was in the 1971–72 season, when the University of Sussex, fresh from two series wins, managed only 10 points. However, a low score was also achieved by Victoria University of Manchester in their first round match in 1975 when, for much of the recording, they answered only with the names of Marxists as a protest against the Oxford and Cambridge colleges being able to enter separate teams. This resulted in Manchester being banned from entering a team for a number of years.

Under Jeremy Paxman, the lowest score achieved by a student team was also 10 which, coincidentally, was also achieved by a team from the University of Sussex, in the first round of the 2021–22 series when they faced the University of Birmingham who scored 245. In the same series, the lowest winning score for a student team was achieved, by Emmanuel College, Cambridge, who scored 85 in a quarter final against King's College London who scored 80. The second lowest losing score is 15, which was achieved by the University of Exeter in a 2008–09 quarter-final against Corpus Christi, Oxford, whose team captain Gail Trimble answered 15 starter questions correctly. However, the Corpus Christi team were later disqualified from the competition after it was found that team member Sam Kay had been ineligible for the last three matches. Therefore, the second lowest score officially achieved against eligible opponents under Paxman was by Lincoln College, Oxford, who totalled 30 in a semi-final against the eventual series champions the University of Manchester, in an episode televised on 9 February 2009, just two weeks after the Corpus Christi vs Exeter match; this was also matched in the grand final by St John's College, Oxford, against Peterhouse, Cambridge, on 18 April 2016.

Before these matches, the lowest Paxman-era score was 35, reached by New Hall, Cambridge, 1997. This score would have been lower if all deductions for incorrect interruptions had been applied.

The lowest score under Amol Rajan's chairmanship so far is 25, scored by Wadham College, Oxford in the second round of the 2024–25 series against the then-defending champions Imperial College London, who scored 345.

The lowest score during the Professionals series was achieved by the House of Commons team, who scored 25 in 2003.

In the 2014 Christmas University Challenge series, a team of alumni from Newcastle University finished with 25. An all-time record low score for the series was achieved in the final of the 2017 Christmas series, when Keble College, Oxford, beat the University of Reading 240–0. The previous year's Christmas series saw the lowest winning score of all time, 75, scored by the University of Nottingham, who defeated their opponents, the University of Bristol, by just five points.

=== Highest scores ===
University College, Oxford, scored 520 points in the final ITV season in 1987. In the Jeremy Paxman era, the team from Open University scored the highest score, 415, in the semi-final in 1997 against Charing Cross and Westminster Medical School.

=== Specials ===
Year	Special Event	Winners	Runners up
1978	College Bowl-University Challenge World Championship	University Challenge "all-stars"	Stanford University
1979	College Bowl-University Challenge World Championship	Sidney Sussex College, Cambridge	Davidson College
1984	1984 Christmas special		
1986	International best of three series	Great Britain (Jesus College, Oxford, 1985)	New Zealand (University of Auckland, 1985)
1987	International best of three series	Great Britain (Keble College, Oxford, 1986)	New Zealand (University of Otago, 1986)
1992	Pro-Celebrity match	Celebrity Past Contestants (Alastair Little, John Simpson, Stephen Fry, Charles Moore)(Appropriately enough, all the celebrities studied at Cambridge colleges making this an Oxbridge match.)	Keble College, Oxford (A team of current students from the college, as they were the "defending champions", having won the last series of the show, back in 1987.)
1997	College Bowl Challenge	University of Michigan	Imperial College London, 1996
1997	Mastermind Challenge	Magdalen College, Oxford, 1997	The last 4 Mastermind finalists from the Magnus Magnusson era: Claire Ockwell, Andrea Weston, Colin Cadby (Captain) and Anne Ashurst (series champion)
1997	College Bowl Challenge	USA	UK
1998	Champions' Challenge	Magdalen College, Oxford, 1997	Imperial College London, 1996
1998	Universe Challenge	Red Dwarf Fans: (Darryl Ball, Kaley Nichols, Steve Rogers [Chairman of the Official Red Dwarf Fan Club], Pip Swallow, Sharon Burnett [Co-author of The Red Dwarf Quiz Book])	Red Dwarf Cast: (Robert Llewellyn, Danny John-Jules, Chris Barrie, Chloë Annett, Craig Charles)
1998	Challenge	Magdalen College, Oxford, 1998	Leicester, 1963
1999	Journalists Special	Tabloids (Jane Moore, Peter Hitchens, Ann Leslie, Tony Parsons)	Broadsheets (Decca Aitkenhead, Libby Purves, Boris Johnson, Richard Ingrams)
2002	University Challenge: Reunited	Sidney Sussex College, Cambridge, 1979	Keele, 1968
2003	Comic Relief match	The Townies (Jeremy Beadle, Gina Yashere, Danny Baker, Johnny Vaughan)	The Gownies (David Baddiel, Frank Skinner, Stephen Fry, Clive Anderson)
2003	University Challenge: The Professionals	The Inland Revenue	Royal Meteorological Society
2004	International "Grand Final": UK vs India	Sardar Patel College of Engineering (SPCE), Mumbai: (Nirad Inamdar, Bharat Jayakumar, Nishad Manerikar, Shrijit Plappally)	Gonville and Caius College, Cambridge: (Laura Ashe, Darren Khodaverdi, Lameen Souag, Edward Wallace)
2004	University Challenge: The Professionals	British Library	Oxford University Press
2004	Christmas Special 1	Television (Monty Don, Martha Kearney, Andrew Neil, Clare Balding)	Radio (Henry Blofeld, Jenni Murray, Ned Sherrin, Roger Bolton)
	Christmas Special 2	Critics (Waldemar Januszczak, Russell Davies, Brian Sewell, Andrew Graham-Dixon)	Theatre (Adrian Noble, Harriet Walter, Tim Rice, Ken Campbell)
	Christmas Specials: Final	Critics	Television
2005	Comic Relief 2005 Match	The South (Sarah Alexander, Hugh Grant, Stephen Fry, Omid Djalili)	The North (Colin Murray, John Thomson, Armando Iannucci, Neil Morrissey)
2005	University Challenge: The Professionals	Privy Council Office	Romantic Novelists' Association
2005	Christmas Special 1	News (Kate Adie, Nick Robinson, Michael Buerk, Bridget Kendall)	Politics (Mark Oaten, Diane Abbott, Tim Yeo, Stephen Pound)
	Christmas Special 2	Writers (Tony Marchant, Andrew Davies, Iain Banks, Jimmy McGovern)	Actors (Robert Powell, Samuel West, Janet Suzman, Martin Jarvis)
	Christmas Specials: Final	Writers	News
2006	University Challenge: The Professionals	Bodleian Library	Royal Statistical Society
2008	University Challenge: The Professionals	Ministry of Justice	National Physical Laboratory
2011	Christmas University Challenge	Trinity College, Cambridge (Robin Bhattacharyya, Daisy Goodwin, John Lloyd, Edward Stourton)	University of Warwick (Vadim Jean, Daisy Christodoulou, Christian Wolmar, Carla Mendonça)
2012	Christmas University Challenge	New College, Oxford (Rachel Johnson, Patrick Gale, Kate Mosse, Yan Wong)	University of East Anglia (John Boyne, Razia Iqbal, David Grossman, Charlie Higson)
2013	Christmas University Challenge	Gonville and Caius College, Cambridge (Quentin Stafford-Fraser, Helen Castor, Mark Damazer, Lars Tharp)	Emmanuel College, Cambridge (Hugo Rifkind, Mary-Ann Ochota, Simon Singh, Rory McGrath)
2014	Champion of Champions	University of Manchester (Henry Pertinez, Gareth Aubrey, Tristan Burke, Adam Barr)	Magdalen College, Oxford (Matthew Chan, Freya McClements, Jim Adams, Sarah Healey)
2014	Christmas University Challenge	Trinity Hall, Cambridge (Tom James, Emma Pooley, Adam Mars-Jones, Dan Starkey)	University of Hull (Rosie Millard, Malcolm Sinclair, Jenni Murray, Stan Cullimore)
2015	Christmas University Challenge	Magdalen College, Oxford (Robin Lane Fox, Heather Berlin, Louis Theroux, Matt Ridley)	University of Sheffield (Sid Lowe, Nicci Gerrard, Adam Hart, Ruth Reed)
2016	Christmas University Challenge	St Hilda's College, Oxford (Fiona Caldicott, Daisy Dunn, Val McDermid, Adèle Geras)	University of Leeds (Louise Doughty, Gus Unger-Hamilton, Kamal Ahmed, Steve Bell)
2017	Christmas University Challenge	Keble College, Oxford (Paul Johnson, Frank Cottrell-Boyce, Katy Brand, Anne-Marie Imafidon)	University of Reading (Anna Machin, Martin Hughes-Games, Sophie Walker, Pippa Greenwood)
2018	Christmas University Challenge	Peterhouse, Cambridge (Dan Mazer, Mark Horton, Michael Howard, Michael Axworthy)	University of Bristol (Philip Ball, Laura Wade, Misha Glenny, Iain Stewart)
2019	Comic Relief 2019 Match	Team Freeman (Luisa Omielan, Robert Rinder, Martin Freeman, Kerry Godliman)	Team Manford (Darren Harriott, Vick Hope, Jason Manford, Emily Atack)
2019	Christmas University Challenge	University of Leeds (Jonathan Clements, Henry Gee, Richard Coles, Timothy Allen)	Wadham College, Oxford (Jonathan Freedland, Tom Solomon, Anne McElvoy, Roger Mosey)
2020	Children in Need 2020 Match	Team BBC (Dane Baptiste, Anita Rani, Dara Ó Briain, Steve Pemberton)	Team ITV (Iain Stirling, Charlene White, Fay Ripley, Joel Dommett)
2020	Christmas University Challenge	The Courtauld Institute of Art (Tim Marlow, Lavinia Greenlaw, Jacky Klein, Jeremy Deller)	University of Manchester (David Nott, Juliet Jacques, Ade Edmondson, Justin Edwards)
2021	Children in Need 2021 Match	Team BBC (Angela Barnes, Mishal Husain, Rick Edwards, Jon Culshaw)	Team ITV (Russell Kane, Denise Welch, Kaye Adams, Ranj Singh)
2021	Christmas University Challenge	University of Edinburgh (Catherine Slessor, Thomasina Miers, Miles Jupp, Phil Swanson)	Hertford College, Oxford (Soweto Kinch, Elizabeth Norton, Adam Fleming, Isabelle Westbury)
2022	Christmas University Challenge	Balliol College, Oxford (Elizabeth Kiss, Andrew Copson, Martin Edwards, Martin O'Neill)	University of Hull (Katharine Norbury, James Graham, Sian Reese-Williams, Graeme Hall, Sarah Peverley)
2023	Christmas University Challenge	Middlesex University (David Heathcote, Lola Young, Heather Phillipson, David Hepworth, Dan Renton Skinner)	Corpus Christi College, Oxford (Francesca Happé, Michael Cockerell, Alex Bellos, Steve Waters)
2024	Christmas University Challenge	Durham University (Liz James, Tracey MacLeod, Carla Denyer, Sophia Smith Galer)	Queens' College, Cambridge (John Zarnecki, Stephanie Merritt, Jenny Kleeman, Richard K. Morgan)
2025	Christmas University Challenge	Durham University (Liz James, Tracey MacLeod, Carla Denyer, Sophia Smith Galer)	Keble College, Oxford (Paul Johnson, Frank Cottrell-Boyce, Anne-Marie Imafidon, Caroline Criado Perez)

Some information from this table was obtained from the web pages listed in "Special Series". Sean Blanchflower.

== Transmissions ==
=== ITV series ===
Series	Start date	End date	Episodes
1	21 September 1962	26 November 1963	62
2	3 December 1963	26 May 1965	60
3	25 August 1965	8 June 1966	42
4	7 September 1966	3 June 1967	40
5	27 September 1967	24 July 1968	44
6	2 August 1968	13 July 1969	45
7	20 July 1969	30 August 1970	46
8	25 October 1970	1 August 1971	41
9	17 October 1971	23 July 1972	41
10	25 October 1972	5 September 1973	39
11	31 October 1973	2 October 1974	40
12	October 1974	31 October 1975	40
13	7 November 1975	10 December 1976	44
14	17 December 1976	31 October 1977	36
15	7 November 1977	20 November 1978	43
16	27 November 1978	4 February 1980	40
17	18 February 1980	8 December 1980	37
18	15 December 1980	7 December 1981	39
19	14 January 1982	16 January 1983	43
20	30 January 1983	21 December 1983	39
21	20 January 1984	27 December 1984	34
22	7 April 1986	30 May 1986	40
23	13 July 1987	4 September 1987	40

=== BBC series ===
Series	Start date	End date	Episodes
24	21 September 1994	29 March 1995	27
25	1 November 1995	1 May 1996	27
26	12 November 1996	4 June 1997	27
27	10 September 1997	21 April 1998	27
28	2 September 1998	27 April 1999	31
29	13 September 1999	9 May 2000	31
30	4 September 2000	2 April 2001	31
31	23 July 2001	11 March 2002	31
32	2 September 2002	31 March 2003	31
33	15 September 2003	12 April 2004	31
34	13 September 2004	9 May 2005	31
35	19 September 2005	15 May 2006	31
36	7 August 2006	16 April 2007	31
37	9 July 2007	3 March 2008	31
38	7 July 2008	23 February 2009	31
39	6 July 2009	5 April 2010	37
40	5 July 2010	4 April 2011	37
41	4 July 2011	19 March 2012	37
42	16 July 2012	29 April 2013	37
43	15 July 2013	7 April 2014	37
44	14 July 2014	13 April 2015	37
45	13 July 2015	18 April 2016	37
46	11 July 2016	10 April 2017	37
47	17 July 2017	23 April 2018	37
48	16 July 2018	22 April 2019	37
49	15 July 2019	20 April 2020	37
50	13 July 2020	5 April 2021	37
51	12 July 2021	4 April 2022	37
52	29 August 2022	29 May 2023	37
53	17 July 2023	8 April 2024	37
54	12 August 2024	12 May 2025	37
55	14 July 2025	20 April 2026	37
56	13 July 2026	TBA	37

== Spin-off shows ==
The producers of the programme have taken the more recent inclusion of mature students to its logical conclusion by making two series without any student participants: University Challenge Reunited (2002) brought former teams back together, while University Challenge: The Professionals (from 2003) matched occupational groups such as civil servants, architects and doctors against each other. In 2003, the former was won by the 1979 team from Sidney Sussex College, Cambridge, the latter by a team from the Inland Revenue. The 2004 Professionals series was won by the British Library, and the 2005 series by the Privy Council Office. In 2006, Professionals was won by staff of the Bodleian Library of the University of Oxford.

The show has seen numerous specials, including those for specific professions and celebrity editions, such as Universe Challenge, presented by former host and Red Dwarf fan, Bamber Gascoigne, where the cast of Red Dwarf challenged a team of their "ultimate fans" to celebrate Red Dwarf's 10th anniversary on the air. The cast was Chris Barrie (captain), Danny John-Jules, Robert Llewellyn, Chloë Annett and Craig Charles. The cast, who at times seemed amazed at the fans' knowledge, lost, but by only 15 points, 280–295.

=== Similar programmes ===
Sixth Form Challenge, hosted by Chris Kelly, appeared briefly between 1965 and 1967. The sixth form contestants represented leading public schools and grammar schools. An untelevised version, Schools' Challenge, continues to run at junior and senior secondary school levels.

Challenging Times was a quiz show for teams representing higher education institutes in Ireland, televised by RTÉ from 1991 to 2001.

=== Other countries ===
University Challenge ran in New Zealand for 14 seasons, from 1976 until 1989, with international series held between the previous years' British and New Zealand champions in both 1986 and 1987. It originally aired on TVNZ 1 and was hosted by Peter Sinclair from 1976 to 1977 and again from 1980 to 1989. From 1978 to 1979, Sinclair was briefly dropped from the show and was replaced by University of Otago lecturer Charles Higham, Sinclair returned in 1980 and from 1981 to 1982, the show briefly moved to TVNZ 2, it moved back to TV1 in 1983 and remained on the network until the series original conclusion in 1989. The series was revived in 2014 by Cue TV and aired on Prime with Cue TV owner Tom Conroy as host and ran until its second conclusion in 2017.

University Challenge, hosted by Magnus Clarke, ran in Australia on the ABC from 1987 until 1989. In the 1988 series, the University of New South Wales defeated the University of Melbourne in the final by 245 points to 175.

University Challenge India started in summer 2003, with the season culminating in the finals of March 2004 where Sardar Patel College of Engineering (SPCE), Mumbai, beat Indian School of Business (ISB), Hyderabad. The 2004–2005 season finale saw a team of undergraduate engineering students from Netaji Subhas Institute of Technology (NSIT), Delhi, beat a team of management students from the Indian Institute of Management Kozhikode. The Indian winners of the 2003–2004 season went on to beat the finalists from the UK show, Gonville and Caius College, Cambridge. UC India is produced by BBC World India, and Synergy Communications, co-owned by Siddhartha Basu, who also hosted the show.

University Challenge inspired the format of two Dutch-language shows: Universiteitsstrijd (the Netherlands), which ran for one season in 2016 on NTR, and De Campus Cup (Belgium), which ran since 2019 on Canvas.
