= University Challenge 1995–96 =

Series 25 of University Challenge ran between 1 November 1995 and 1 May 1996.

== Results ==
- Winning teams are highlighted in **bold**.
- Teams with green scores (winners) returned in the next round, while those with red scores (losers) were eliminated.
- Teams with orange scores have lost, but survived as highest scoring losers.
- A score in italics indicates a match decided on a tie-breaker question.

=== First round ===
Team 1	Score		Team 2	Broadcast Date
**University of Middlesex**	215	200	University of Exeter	1 November 1995
**London School of Economics**	260	155	Keble College, Oxford	8 November 1995
**University of Lancaster**	240	225	University of Wales, Swansea	15 November 1995
University of Surrey	155	175	**Liverpool John Moores University**	22 November 1995
Gonville and Caius College, Cambridge	195	210	**University College, Oxford**	29 November 1995
Charing Cross and Westminster Medical School	95	230	**Heriot-Watt University**	6 December 1995
**Keele University**	190	160	Trinity Hall, Cambridge	13 December 1995
**Newcastle University**	295	155	The Open University	20 December 1995
University of Birmingham	135	270	**Selwyn College, Cambridge**	29 December 1995
University of St Andrews	125	205	**Imperial College London**	3 January 1996
Pembroke College, Oxford	200	215	**University of Warwick**	10 January 1996
Lucy Cavendish College, Cambridge	120	240	**South Bank University**	17 January 1996

=== Second round ===
Team 1	Score		Team 2	Broadcast Date
University of Middlesex	220	225	**Selwyn College, Cambridge**	24 January 1996
**University College, Oxford**	335	105	Heriot-Watt University	31 January 1996
**London School of Economics**	230	195	Keele University	7 February 1996
**Pembroke College, Oxford**	285	200	University of Wales, Swansea	14 February 1996
**University of Warwick**	200	170	Gonville and Caius College, Cambridge	21 February 1996
**Newcastle University**	300	140	South Bank University	28 February 1996
**University of Exeter**	185	165	Liverpool John Moores University	6 March 1996
**Imperial College London**	290	140	University of Lancaster	13 March 1996

=== Quarter-finals ===
Team 1	Score		Team 2	Broadcast Date
**Selwyn College, Cambridge**	270	175	University College, Oxford	20 March 1996
**London School of Economics**	225	190	Pembroke College, Oxford	27 March 1996
**University of Warwick**	235	165	Newcastle University	3 April 1996
University of Exeter	70	325	**Imperial College London**	10 April 1996

=== Semi-finals ===
Team 1	Score		Team 2	Broadcast Date
Selwyn College, Cambridge	210	280	**London School of Economics**	17 April 1996
University of Warwick	230	300	**Imperial College London**	24 April 1996

=== Final ===
Team 1	Score		Team 2	Broadcast Date
London School of Economics	220	275	**Imperial College London**	1 May 1996

- The trophy and title were awarded to the Imperial team of Jim Totty, Nick Bradshaw, Mark Pallen and Chris Harrison.
- The trophy was presented by John Simpson.
