= University Challenge 1996–97 =

Series 26 of University Challenge ran between 12 November 1996 and 4 June 1997.

== Results ==
- Winning teams are highlighted in **bold**.
- Teams with green scores (winners) returned in the next round, while those with red scores (losers) were eliminated.
- Teams with orange scores have lost, but survived as highest scoring losers.
- A score in italics indicates a match decided on a tie-breaker question.

=== First round ===
Team 1	Score		Team 2	Broadcast Date
Imperial College, London	200	210	**St Catharine's College, Cambridge**	12 November 1996
**Queen's University, Belfast**	165	135	University of Wales, Cardiff	19 November 1996
**King's College London School of Medicine and Dentistry**	155	135	Keble College, Oxford	26 November 1996
**University of Manchester**	360	40	Birkbeck, University of London	3 December 1996
**Newnham College, Cambridge**	200	155	London School of Economics	10 December 1996
Charing Cross Hospital	175	220	**University of Glamorgan**	17 December 1996
**University of St Andrews**	215	170	Girton College, Cambridge	6 January 1997
University of Surrey	130	230	**University of the West of England**	13 January 1997
**Corpus Christi College, Cambridge**	240	205	Exeter College, Oxford	20 January 1997
**The Open University**	395	85	University of Wales, Swansea	27 January 1997
**Harris Manchester College, Oxford**	200	165	University of Glasgow	3 February 1997
University of Portsmouth	150	280	**Magdalen College, Oxford**	10 February 1997

=== Second round ===
Team 1	Score		Team 2	Broadcast Date
**Magdalen College, Oxford**	195	175	University of the West of England	26 February 1997
**Queen's University, Belfast**	250	130	Girton College, Cambridge	5 March 1997
**Victoria University of Manchester**	200	165	Imperial College, London	12 March 1997
**University of Glamorgan**	155	150	University of St Andrews	19 March 1997
Newnham College, Cambridge	125	165	**Harris Manchester College, Oxford**	26 March 1997
**Charing Cross Hospital**	225	95	King's College London School of Medicine and Dentistry	2 April 1997
St Catharine's College, Cambridge	215	255	**Exeter College, Oxford**	9 April 1997
Corpus Christi College, Cambridge	185	215	**The Open University**	16 April 1997

=== Quarter-finals ===
Team 1	Score		Team 2	Broadcast Date
**Magdalen College, Oxford**	335	110	Queen's University, Belfast	23 April 1997
**Victoria University of Manchester**	235	150	University of Glamorgan	30 April 1997
Harris Manchester College, Oxford	135	210	**Charing Cross Hospital**	7 May 1997
Exeter College, Oxford	170	180	**The Open University**	14 May 1997

=== Semi-finals ===
Team 1	Score		Team 2	Broadcast Date
**Magdalen College, Oxford**	240	225	Victoria University of Manchester	21 May 1997
Charing Cross Hospital	65	415	**The Open University**	28 May 1997

=== Final ===
Team 1	Score		Team 2	Broadcast Date
**Magdalen College, Oxford**	250	195	The Open University	4 June 1997

- The trophy and title were awarded to the Magdalen team of Colin Andress, Gwilym Thear, Jim Adams, and Alison Reeves.
- The trophy was presented by Germaine Greer.
