= University Challenge 2004–05 =

British television quiz programme

Series 34 of University Challenge began on 13 September 2004 and was broadcast on BBC Two. This is a list of the matches played, their scores, and outcomes.

== Results ==
- Winning teams are highlighted in **bold**.
- Teams with green scores (winners) returned in the next round, while those with red scores (losers) were eliminated.
- Teams with orange scores have lost, but survived as highest scoring losers.
- A score in italics indicates a match decided on a tie-breaker question.

=== First round ===
Team 1	Score		Team 2	Broadcast Date
**University of Leicester**	150	145	Jesus College, Cambridge	13 September 2004
University of York	120	250	**University of Lancaster**	20 September 2004
**University of Newcastle**	155	150	University College, Oxford	27 September 2004
University of Warwick	100	265	**University College London**	4 October 2004
**Balliol College, Oxford**	170	105	Downing College, Cambridge	11 October 2004
**Durham University**	190	70	Kingston University	1 November 2004
St John's College, Cambridge	70	195	**University of Reading**	8 November 2004
University of Glasgow	100	125	**University of Edinburgh**	15 November 2004
**St Hilda's College, Oxford**	150	120	University of Portsmouth	22 November 2004
Magdalene College, Cambridge	80	195	**University of Sheffield**	29 November 2004
Queen's University, Belfast	130	185	**University of East Anglia**	6 December 2004
Trinity College, Cambridge	110	195	**Corpus Christi College, Oxford**	13 December 2004
University of St Andrews	40	315	**University of Manchester**	20 December 2004
**Royal Holloway, University of London**	135	75	Greyfriars, Oxford	3 January 2005

==== Highest Scoring Losers Playoffs ====
Team 1	Score		Team 2	Broadcast Date
**University College, Oxford**	200	85	University of York	10 January 2005
**Jesus College, Cambridge**	275	40	Queen's University, Belfast	17 January 2005

=== Second round ===
Team 1	Score		Team 2	Broadcast Date
**University of Edinburgh**	155	70	Royal Holloway, University of London	24 January 2005
**University of Manchester**	250	130	University of Newcastle	31 January 2005
**St Hilda's College, Oxford**	155	120	University of Leicester	7 February 2005
University of Sheffield	145	240	**Corpus Christi College, Oxford**	14 February 2005
**Balliol College, Oxford**	215	195	Durham University	21 February 2005
**University of Lancaster**	175	60	University of Reading	28 February 2005
**University College London**	245	105	University of East Anglia	7 March 2005
University College, Oxford	135	165	**Jesus College, Cambridge**	14 March 2005

=== Quarterfinals ===
Team 1	Score		Team 2	Broadcast Date
**Balliol College, Oxford**	215	75	University of Edinburgh	21 March 2005
**Corpus Christi College, Oxford**	345	80	University of Lancaster	28 March 2005
**University College London**	175	110	Jesus College, Cambridge	4 April 2005
**University of Manchester**	215	150	St Hilda's College, Oxford	11 April 2005

=== Semifinals ===
Team 1	Score		Team 2	Broadcast Date
Balliol College, Oxford	205	255	**Corpus Christi College, Oxford**	18 April 2005
**University College London**	190	185	University of Manchester	25 April 2005

=== Final ===
Team 1	Score		Team 2	Broadcast Date
**Corpus Christi College, Oxford**	250	140	University College London	9 May 2005

- The trophy and title were awarded to the Corpus Christi team of Nick Sharp, Stefano Mariani, Charles Oakley, and David Whitley.
- The trophy was presented by Pete Postlethwaite.
