= University Challenge 2008–09 =

Series 38 of the quiz show University Challenge

Series 38 of the quiz show University Challenge began on 7 July 2008 and was broadcast on BBC Two. This was the last series to use the 31-episode format. This is a list of the matches played, their scores, and outcomes.

== Main draw ==
- Winning teams are highlighted in **bold**.
- Teams with green scores (winners) returned in the next round, while those with red scores (losers) were eliminated.
- Teams with orange scores have lost, but survived as highest scoring losers.
- Teams with black scores have been disqualified.

=== First round ===
Team 1	Score		Team 2	Broadcast Date
University of Hull	140	230	**City University, London**	7 July 2008
**Corpus Christi College, Oxford**	330	95	Durham University	14 July 2008
Royal Veterinary College	95	215	**University of York**	21 July 2008
University of Surrey	170	185	**University of Warwick**	28 July 2008
**Queens' College, Cambridge**	205	115	St George's, University of London	4 August 2008
**University of Exeter**	195	150	Pembroke College, Oxford	11 August 2008
**Selwyn College, Cambridge**	180	115	St Anne's College, Oxford	18 August 2008
**London School of Economics**	220	85	University of Bath	25 August 2008
St John's College, Cambridge	185	220	**Lincoln College, Oxford**	1 September 2008
Murray Edwards College, Cambridge	65	260	**University of Sheffield**	8 September 2008
University of Southampton	135	190	**University of Brighton**	15 September 2008
King's College, Cambridge	180	190	**University of Edinburgh**	22 September 2008
University of Bristol	70	285	**University of Manchester**	29 September 2008
Exeter College, Oxford	135	190	**University of St Andrews**	6 October 2008

==== Highest scoring losers playoffs ====
Team 1	Score		Team 2	Broadcast Date
**St John's College, Cambridge**	325	110	Pembroke College, Oxford	13 October 2008
**King's College, Cambridge**	225	150	University of Surrey	20 October 2008

=== Second round ===
Team 1	Score		Team 2	Broadcast Date
**London School of Economics**	270	135	Selwyn College, Cambridge	10 November 2008
**University of Manchester**	280	80	University of York	17 November 2008
**St John's College, Cambridge**	345	125	King's College, Cambridge	24 November 2008
**Corpus Christi College, Oxford**	295	85	University of Edinburgh	1 December 2008
**Queens' College, Cambridge**	205	125	University of Warwick	8 December 2008
**Lincoln College, Oxford**	280	120	University of St Andrews	15 December 2008
**City University, London**	185	115	University of Brighton	22 December 2008
University of Sheffield	170	175	**University of Exeter**	5 January 2009

=== Quarter-finals ===
Team 1	Score		Team 2	Broadcast Date
**University of Manchester**	210	165	London School of Economics	12 January 2009
**Lincoln College, Oxford**	335	50	Queens' College, Cambridge	19 January 2009
**Corpus Christi College, Oxford**	350	15	University of Exeter	26 January 2009
**St John's College, Cambridge**	265	135	City University, London	2 February 2009

=== Semi-finals ===
Team 1	Score		Team 2	Broadcast Date
**University of Manchester**	345	30	Lincoln College, Oxford	9 February 2009
**Corpus Christi College, Oxford**	260	150	St John's College, Cambridge	16 February 2009

=== Final ===
Team 1	Score		Team 2	Broadcast Date
**University of Manchester**	190	275	Corpus Christi College, Oxford *	23 February 2009

- The trophy and title were originally awarded to the Corpus Christi team of Sam Kay, Lauren Schwartzman, Gail Trimble, and James Marsden, but on 2 March 2009, the BBC in a joint statement with Granada announced that they had disqualified the team for "breaking the series rules".
- The title was therefore retrospectively awarded to the Manchester team of Henry Pertinez, Reuben Roy, Matthew Yeo, and Simon Baker.
- The trophy was presented by Wendy Cope.

== Notable events and press coverage ==
The 2009 series produced the two lowest team scores since the programme was revived by the BBC in 1994. Fifteen points were achieved by the University of Exeter in the third quarter-final against the later disqualified Corpus Christi College, Oxford, and 30 points were scored by Lincoln College, Oxford in a semi-final against University of Manchester. In the Exeter v. Corpus Christi match, Corpus Christi captain Gail Trimble answered a record fifteen starters correctly, leading to much interest on internet forums and in the popular press.

James Archer of King's College, Cambridge was questioned by police after wearing an RAF surplus jacket on the show—in combination with a dyed red mohican haircut—had prompted several complaints from viewers. Archer had obtained the jacket legally, and no further action was taken.

=== The final ===
The final, between Corpus Christi College and Manchester, was broadcast on 23 February 2009. Before the final, press coverage focused on the Corpus Christi captain, Gail Trimble, who had gained an exceptionally high proportion of her team's points. In the final, which was watched by more than 5 million viewers, the show's highest audience share since at least 2001, Trimble scored 125 points in the last four minutes to lead her team to what appeared at the time to be a clear victory. She was described in the British press as the "human Google", and by a defeated contestant as a "relentless juggernaut of intellectual Blitzkrieg".

A few days after the final was broadcast the BBC undertook an investigation into the eligibility of Corpus Christi team member Sam Kay, after it became evident that he had graduated in June 2008, before the filming of the quarter, semi-final and final matches, despite telling viewers he was studying chemistry. Kay left Corpus Christi after failing to get funding for his PhD and at the time of the final was working as an accountant. The captain of the Manchester team, Matthew Yeo, rejected calls for a rematch of the final. However, in a statement on 2 March 2009, the BBC and the programme's makers, Granada, stated that:

"The University Challenge rules on student eligibility are that students taking part must be registered at their university or college for the duration of the recording of the series. Whilst obviously not intending to, Corpus Christi broke this important rule where other universities and colleges taking part adhered to it. We therefore find ourselves in the regrettable position of having no choice but to disqualify Corpus Christi from the final. This means they forfeit their hard-fought title which now goes to the Manchester University team."

Another member of the Corpus Christi team, James Marsden, criticised the BBC decision. He stated that the rules were ambiguous and did not state that students had to be registered at their college for the duration of filming. Gail Trimble was subsequently reported as saying that Corpus Christi, rather than Manchester, still had the trophy, "gathering dust somewhere".
