= University Challenge 2010–11 =

Series 40 of University Challenge began on 5 July 2010 and aired on BBC Two. Below is a list of the matches played with their scores and outcomes.

== Results ==
- Winning teams are highlighted in **bold**.
- Teams with green scores (winners) returned in the next round, while those with red scores (losers) were eliminated.
- Teams with orange scores must win one more match to return in the next round (current highest scoring losers, teams that won their first quarter final match, teams that won their second quarter final match having lost their first, or teams that won their first quarter final match and lost their second).
- Teams with yellow scores indicate that two further matches must be played and won (teams that lost their first quarter final match).
- A score in italics indicates a match decided on a tie-breaker question.

=== First round ===
Team 1	Score		Team 2	Total	Broadcast Date
University of St Andrews	185	190	**University of Bristol**	375	5 July 2010
Cardiff University	210	220	**Oxford Brookes University**	430	12 July 2010
Balliol College, Oxford	155	190	**Queens' College, Cambridge**	345	19 July 2010
**Peterhouse, Cambridge**	265	165	University of Exeter	430	26 July 2010
**University of York**	245	105	Royal College of Music	350	2 August 2010
**Newnham College, Cambridge**	135	115	University of Southampton	250	9 August 2010
**Christ's College, Cambridge**	290	60	University of Liverpool	350	16 August 2010
**Downing College, Cambridge**	160	95	St Edmund Hall, Oxford	255	23 August 2010
University of Newcastle	70	315	**University of Sheffield**	385	30 August 2010
**University College London**	155	125	Hertford College, Oxford	280	6 September 2010
Durham University	120	340	**Magdalen College, Oxford**	460	13 September 2010
**University of Edinburgh**	335	35	Jesus College, Oxford	370	20 September 2010
**University of the Arts London**	215	95	Imperial College London	310	27 September 2010
**Merton College, Oxford**	180	175	St John's College, Cambridge	355	11 October 2010

==== Highest Scoring Losers play-offs ====
Team 1	Score		Team 2	Total	Broadcast Date
Cardiff University	140	225	**University of Exeter**	365	18 October 2010
University of St Andrews	165	225	**St John's College, Cambridge**	390	25 October 2010

=== Second round ===
Team 1	Score		Team 2	Total	Broadcast Date
**Christ's College, Cambridge**	220	160	University of Edinburgh	380	1 November 2010
**Oxford Brookes University**	320	100	University of the Arts London	420	8 November 2010
University of Exeter	140	195	**University of York**	335	15 November 2010
**Peterhouse, Cambridge**	215	205	St John's College, Cambridge	420	22 November 2010
University College London	230	250	**University of Sheffield**	480	29 November 2010
Downing College, Cambridge	125	190	**Magdalen College, Oxford**	315	6 December 2010
Merton College, Oxford	120	175	**Queens' College, Cambridge**	295	13 December 2010
Newnham College, Cambridge	70	275	**University of Bristol**	345	20 December 2010

=== Quarter-finals ===
Team 1	Score		Team 2	Total	Broadcast Date
Christ's College, Cambridge	160	185	**Oxford Brookes University**	345	10 January 2011
University of York	120	205	**Peterhouse, Cambridge**	325	17 January 2011
**University of Sheffield**	230	225	Magdalen College, Oxford	455	24 January 2011
**Queens' College, Cambridge**	190	160	University of Bristol	350	31 January 2011
Oxford Brookes University	135	265	**University of Sheffield**	400	7 February 2011
Christ's College, Cambridge	120	330	**Magdalen College, Oxford**	450	14 February 2011
**Peterhouse, Cambridge**	215	160	Queens' College, Cambridge	375	21 February 2011
**University of York**	280	140	University of Bristol	420	28 February 2011
**Magdalen College, Oxford**	245	195	Queens' College, Cambridge	440	7 March 2011
Oxford Brookes University	190	195	**University of York**	385	14 March 2011

=== Semi-finals ===
Team 1	Score		Team 2	Total	Broadcast Date
University of Sheffield	155	250	**University of York**	405	21 March 2011
Peterhouse, Cambridge	130	260	**Magdalen College, Oxford**	390	28 March 2011

=== Final ===
Team 1	Score		Team 2	Total	Broadcast Date
University of York	85	290	**Magdalen College, Oxford**	375	4 April 2011

- The trophy and title were awarded to the Magdalen team of James McComish, Kyle Haddad-Fonda, Matthew Chan, and Will Cudmore.
- The trophy was presented by Antony Beevor.
