= University Challenge 2024–25 =

Season of a television programme

The 54th series of University Challenge began on 12 August 2024 on BBC Two, and ended with the final on 12 May 2025, when Christ's College, Cambridge beat the University of Warwick for their inaugural championship, while also being the first Oxbridge winners in seven years.

== Results ==
There were no debutant institutions in this series, all institutions having appeared previously, however this series saw the first University of Leeds team in over 13 years, having last appeared in 2011, and Exeter College, Oxford's previous appearance was in 2008.

- Winning teams are highlighted in **bold**.
- Teams with green scores (winners) returned in the next round, while those with red scores (losers) were eliminated.
- Teams with orange scores had to win one more match to return in the next round.
- Teams with yellow scores indicate that two further matches had to be played and won (teams that lost their first quarter-final match).
- A score in italics indicates a match decided on a tie-breaker question.

=== First round ===
Team 1	Score		Team 2	Total	Broadcast date
**Queen's University Belfast**	240	125	University of Liverpool	365	12 August 2024
**Open University**	190	175	University College London	365	19 August 2024
Gonville and Caius College, Cambridge	80	325	**University of Bristol**	405	26 August 2024
**University of Warwick**	275	125	University of East Anglia	400	2 September 2024
St Catharine's College, Cambridge	120	180	**Wadham College, Oxford**	300	9 September 2024
**Imperial College London**	310	75	University of Manchester	385	16 September 2024
University of Reading	100	240	**University of Exeter**	340	23 September 2024
**Darwin College, Cambridge**	205	110	Birkbeck, University of London	315	30 September 2024
**Oriel College, Oxford**	200	165	Durham University	365	7 October 2024
Exeter College, Oxford	110	205	**Christ's College, Cambridge**	315	14 October 2024
University of St Andrews	145	200	**Cardiff University**	345	21 October 2024
University of Leeds	125	175	**University of Edinburgh**	300	28 October 2024
**London School of Economics**	235	100	University of Leicester	335	4 November 2024
SOAS University of London	155	195	**St Edmund Hall, Oxford**	350	11 November 2024

=== Highest scoring losers play-offs ===
Team 1	Score		Team 2	Total	Broadcast date
**University College London**	215	105	University of St Andrews	320	18 November 2024
**Durham University**	150	145	SOAS University of London	295	25 November 2024

=== Second round ===
Team 1	Score		Team 2	Total	Broadcast date
**University College London**	255	55	London School of Economics	310	2 December 2024
Durham University	115	180	**Open University**	295	9 December 2024
University of Exeter	35	290	**University of Bristol**	325	16 December 2024
**Darwin College, Cambridge**	155	125	University of Edinburgh	280	6 January 2025
Wadham College, Oxford	25	345	**Imperial College London**	370	13 January 2025
**Christ's College, Cambridge**	215	100	St Edmund Hall, Oxford	315	20 January 2025
Cardiff University	70	180	**Queen's University Belfast**	250	27 January 2025
**University of Warwick**	215	110	Oriel College, Oxford	325	3 February 2025

=== Quarter-finals ===
Team 1	Score		Team 2	Total	Broadcast date
Imperial College London	160	180	**Christ's College, Cambridge**	340	10 February 2025
Queen's University Belfast	95	215	**University of Warwick**	310	17 February 2025
University College London	120	225	**Darwin College, Cambridge**	345	24 February 2025
Open University	95	135	**University of Bristol**	230	3 March 2025
**Christ's College, Cambridge**	205	155	University of Warwick	360	10 March 2025
Imperial College London	170	180	**Queen's University Belfast**	350	17 March 2025
**Darwin College, Cambridge**	160	150	University of Bristol	310	24 March 2025
**University College London**	235	105	Open University	340	31 March 2025
**University of Warwick**	220	125	University College London	345	7 April 2025
Queen's University Belfast	65	200	**University of Bristol**	265	14 April 2025

=== Semi-finals ===
Team 1	Score		Team 2	Total	Broadcast date
**Christ's College, Cambridge**	220	50	University of Bristol	270	21 April 2025
Darwin College, Cambridge	160	180	**University of Warwick**	340	28 April 2025

=== Final ===
Team 1	Score		Team 2	Total	Broadcast date
**Christ's College, Cambridge**	175	170	University of Warwick	345	12 May 2025

In what was the most closely contested final seen in the revival era of University Challenge, Warwick led for almost the entire match, having held sizable scoring margins of 125 to 40, and 175 to 115; the latter being held with less than five minutes to go.

Christ's, however, clawed their way back, and ultimately tied level on the final starter-for-ten, after Anniko Firman identified Agamemnon as the Greek ruler whose translated line in Book 11 of Homer's Odyssey was used to create the title of the 1930 William Faulkner novel As I Lay Dying. They then correctly answered one of the resulting bonuses before the gong, to complete their comeback victory and end the series unbeaten.

- The trophy and title were thus awarded to the Christ's College, Cambridge team of Anniko Firman, Brendan Bethlehem, Oscar Despard and Linus Luu, leaving the Warwick team which consisted of Ananya Govindarajan, Thomas Hart, Oscar Siddle and Benjamin Watson as the runners-up.
- The trophy was presented by Sir Ian McKellen in a separate ceremony at the ADC Theatre in Cambridge.

== Spin-off: Christmas Special 2024 ==
A spin-off Christmas series has been aired since 2011, featuring distinguished alumni.

=== First round ===
Out of seven first-round winners, only the top four highest-scoring teams progress to the semi-finals.

- Winning teams are highlighted in **bold**.
- Teams with green scores (winners) returned in the next round, while those with red scores (losers) were eliminated.
- Teams with grey scores won their match but did not achieve a high enough score to proceed to the next round.
- A score in italics indicates a match decided on a tie-breaker question.

Team 1	Score		Team 2	Total	Broadcast date
University of Warwick	35	265	**Durham University**	300	23 December 2024
**Worcester College, Oxford**	155	105	University of Bristol	260	24 December 2024
Manchester Metropolitan University	110	135	**University of Brighton**	245	26 December 2024
Leeds Trinity University	100	115	**University of Nottingham**	215	27 December 2024
University of Southampton	125	150	**Churchill College, Cambridge**	275	29 December 2024
Emmanuel College, Cambridge	95	175	**Queens' College, Cambridge**	270	30 December 2024
**University of St Andrews**	130	65	London School of Economics	195	31 December 2024

=== Semi-finals ===
Team 1	Score		Team 2	Total	Broadcast date
**Durham University**	120	85	Worcester College, Oxford	205	1 January 2025
Churchill College, Cambridge	95	105	**Queens' College, Cambridge**	200	2 January 2025

=== Final ===
Team 1	Score		Team 2	Total	Broadcast date
**Durham University**	125	120	Queens' College, Cambridge	245	3 January 2025

Having taken the lead on the final starter question, the winning Durham University team consisted of Liz James, Tracey MacLeod, Carla Denyer, and Sophia Smith Galer, who beat Queens' College, Cambridge and their team of John Zarnecki, Stephanie Merritt, Jenny Kleeman and Richard K. Morgan.
