= University Challenge 1999–2000 =

British television quiz programme

Series 29 of University Challenge began on 13 September 1999, with the final on 9 May 2000.

== Results ==
- Winning teams are highlighted in **bold**.
- Teams with green scores (winners) returned in the next round, while those with red scores (losers) were eliminated.
- Teams with orange scores have lost, but survived as the first round losers with the highest losing scores.
- A score in italics indicates a match decided on a tie-breaker question.
- A score in brown indicates third place.

=== First round ===
Team 1	Score		Team 2	Broadcast Date
**University of Newcastle**	195	185	University of Warwick	13 September 1999
Imperial Medical School	135	165	**New Hall, Cambridge**	20 September 1999
Fitzwilliam College, Cambridge	205	245	**University of Sheffield**	27 September 1999
Cranfield University	110	280	**University of Nottingham**	4 October 1999
**University of Salford**	250	145	Royal Academy of Music	11 October 1999
Trinity College, Cambridge	150	165	**Keble College, Oxford**	18 October 1999
**University of Wales, Aberystwyth**	230	140	University of Glasgow	25 October 1999
St Catharine's College, Cambridge	90	250	**Oriel College, Oxford**	1 November 1999
Royal Veterinary College	135	150	**Jesus College, Cambridge**	8 November 1999
University of Edinburgh	125	185	**Peterhouse, Cambridge**	15 November 1999
**King's College London School of Medicine**	205	110	St Hilda's College, Oxford	22 November 1999
**Christ Church, Oxford**	255	150	University of Leeds	29 November 1999
**University of Manchester Institute of Science and Technology**	190	165	University College London	6 December 1999
**University of North London**	205	175	Durham University	13 December 1999

==== Highest Scoring Losers Playoffs ====
Team 1	Score		Team 2	Broadcast Date
Fitzwilliam College, Cambridge	215	230	**Durham University**	17 January 2000
University of Warwick	115	245	**University College London**	24 January 2000

=== Second round ===
Team 1	Score		Team 2	Broadcast Date
**University of Nottingham**	215	155	University of North London	31 January 2000
**Oriel College, Oxford**	225	170	Peterhouse, Cambridge	7 February 2000
**University of Newcastle**	180	150	Jesus College, Cambridge	14 February 2000
University of Sheffield	90	245	**Keble College, Oxford**	21 February 2000
New Hall, Cambridge	155	200	**University of Wales, Aberystwyth**	28 February 2000
King's College London School of Medicine	125	360	**Durham University**	6 March 2000
University of Salford	135	245	**University of Manchester Institute of Science and Technology**	13 March 2000
**Christ Church, Oxford**	200	170	University College London	20 March 2000

=== Quarterfinals ===
Team 1	Score		Team 2	Broadcast Date
University of Nottingham	175	200	**Oriel College, Oxford**	27 March 2000
University of Newcastle	120	210	**Keble College, Oxford**	3 April 2000
University of Wales, Aberystwyth	160	340	**Durham University**	10 April 2000
**University of Manchester Institute of Science and Technology**	205	190	Christ Church, Oxford	17 April 2000

=== Semifinals ===
Team 1	Score		Team 2	Broadcast Date
**Oriel College, Oxford**	220	120	Keble College, Oxford	25 April 2000
**Durham University**	250	180	University of Manchester Institute of Science and Technology	2 May 2000

=== Final ===
Team 1	Score		Team 2	Broadcast Date
Oriel College, Oxford	135	325	**Durham University**	9 May 2000

- The trophy and title were awarded to the Durham team of John Stewart, Nick Allan, Nick Ledger, and Colin Telfer.
- The trophy was presented by Jeremy Paxman.
