= University Challenge 1994–95 =

- Presented by: Jeremy Paxman

Original release
- Network: BBC Two
- Release: 21 September 1994 – 29 March 1995

Series 24 of University Challenge ran between 21 September 1994 and 29 March 1995. This was the first series of the show for eight years and aired on BBC Two for the first time, having previously been broadcast on ITV. This was also the first series to use the 27-episode format. Jeremy Paxman took over as presenter from Bamber Gascoigne, who had presented the show from its inception in 1962 through until 1987.

The series was won by Trinity College, Cambridge, who defeated New College, Oxford 390–180 in the final. The members of the winning team – Sean Blanchflower, Kwasi Kwarteng, Robin Bhattacharyya, and Erik Gray – were presented with the trophy by Gascoigne.

== Results ==
- Winning teams are highlighted in **bold**.
- Teams with green scores (winners) returned in the next round, while those with red scores (losers) were eliminated.
- Teams with orange scores have lost, but survived as highest scoring losers.
- A score in italics indicates a match decided on a tie-breaker question.

=== First round ===
Team 1	Score		Team 2	Broadcast Date
University of Birmingham	170	205	**University of Aberdeen**	21 September 1994
**New College, Oxford**	145	115	University of North London	28 September 1994
**University of Liverpool**	150	100	University of Sheffield	5 October 1994
Brasenose College, Oxford	185	190	**Trinity College, Cambridge**	12 October 1994
University of Manchester Institute of Science and Technology	95	185	**University of Edinburgh**	19 October 1994
The Open University	135	150	**St Benet's Hall, Oxford**	26 October 1994
University of Sussex	120	210	**Robinson College, Cambridge**	2 November 1994
Robert Gordon University	75	225	**University of Bristol**	9 November 1994
**Birkbeck, University of London**	215	160	Queen's University, Belfast	16 November 1994
**Keble College, Oxford**	265	130	University of Hull	23 November 1994
King's College London School of Medicine and Dentistry	120	170	**University of Wales, Lampeter**	30 November 1994
Jesus College, Cambridge	80	290	**University of St Andrews**	7 December 1994

=== Second round ===
Team 1	Score		Team 2	Broadcast Date
**University of Aberdeen**	325	145	Brasenose College, Oxford	14 December 1994
**The Open University**	235	180	University of Bristol	21 December 1994
**Trinity College, Cambridge**	300	215	Queen's University, Belfast	28 December 1994
Birkbeck, University of London	120	255	**University of St Andrews**	4 January 1995
**New College, Oxford**	200	175	St Benet's Hall, Oxford	11 January 1995
University of Wales, Lampeter	150	230	**University of Birmingham**	18 January 1995
Keble College, Oxford	130	255	**University of Edinburgh**	25 January 1995
University of Liverpool	105	255	**Robinson College, Cambridge**	1 February 1995

=== Quarter-finals ===
Team 1	Score		Team 2	Broadcast Date
**University of Aberdeen**	225	155	The Open University	8 February 1995
**Trinity College, Cambridge**	335	155	University of St Andrews	15 February 1995
**New College, Oxford**	175	165	University of Birmingham	22 February 1995
**University of Edinburgh**	230	185	Robinson College, Cambridge	1 March 1995

=== Semi-finals ===
Team 1	Score		Team 2	Broadcast Date
University of Aberdeen	235	245	**Trinity College, Cambridge**	15 March 1995
**New College, Oxford**	260	220	University of Edinburgh	22 March 1995

=== Final ===
Team 1	Score		Team 2	Broadcast Date
**Trinity College, Cambridge**	390	180	New College, Oxford	29 March 1995

- The trophy and title were awarded to the Trinity team of Sean Blanchflower, Kwasi Kwarteng, Robin Bhattacharyya, and Erik Gray.
- The trophy was presented by Bamber Gascoigne.
- This was the first regular series to be hosted by Jeremy Paxman on BBC Two since taking over from Bamber Gascoigne.
