= University Challenge 2006–07 =

British television quiz programme

Series 36 of University Challenge began on 7 August 2006 and was broadcast on BBC Two. This is a list of the matches played, their scores, and outcomes.

== Main draw ==
- Winning teams are highlighted in **bold**.
- Teams with green scores (winners) returned in the next round, while those with red scores (losers) were eliminated.
- Teams with orange scores have lost, but survived as highest scoring losers.
- Teams with black scores have been disqualified.

=== First round ===
Team 1	Score		Team 2	Broadcast Date
**University of Aberystwyth**	205	195	University of Bristol	7 August 2006
**University College London**	165	160	Pembroke College, Cambridge	14 August 2006
**University of York**	265	95	Harris Manchester College, Oxford	21 August 2006
**Merton College, Oxford**	245	150	University of Manchester	28 August 2006
**University of Brighton**	190	130	Imperial College School of Medicine	4 September 2006
**Girton College, Cambridge**	190	140	University of Sussex	11 September 2006
University of Newcastle	95	270	**Royal Holloway, University of London**	18 September 2006
**Durham University**	245	110	Churchill College, Cambridge	25 September 2006
Robinson College, Cambridge	40	295	**Wadham College, Oxford**	1 October 2006
**University of Edinburgh**	195	120	University of Birmingham	8 October 2006
**Corpus Christi College, Oxford**	220	150	University of Reading	15 October 2006
**University of Warwick**	195	115	Emmanuel College, Cambridge	5 November 2006
Linacre College, Oxford	150	170	**University of East Anglia**	12 November 2006
**Somerville College, Oxford**	235	115	Trinity Hall, Cambridge	19 November 2006

==== Highest Scoring Losers Playoffs ====
Team 1	Score		Team 2	Broadcast Date
University of Bristol	145	200	**University of Manchester**	26 November 2006
Pembroke College, Cambridge	185	225	**University of Reading**	3 December 2006

=== Second round ===
Team 1	Score		Team 2	Broadcast Date
**University of Manchester**	210	60	University of Reading	7 January 2007
University of Brighton	110	245	**University of York**	14 January 2007
Merton College, Oxford	170	180	**University of Aberystwyth**	21 January 2007
**Durham University**	260	135	Somerville College, Oxford	28 January 2007
Corpus Christi College, Oxford	45	245	**University of Edinburgh**	4 February 2007
Royal Holloway, University of London	95	170	**Wadham College, Oxford**	11 February 2007
Girton College, Cambridge	85	185	**University College London**	18 February 2007
**University of Warwick**	165	160	University of East Anglia	25 February 2007

=== Quarterfinals ===
Team 1	Score		Team 2	Broadcast Date
**University of Manchester**	230	190	Wadham College, Oxford	4 March 2007
**Durham University**	220	115	University of Edinburgh	11 March 2007
**University College London**	220	145	University of York	18 March 2007
University of Aberystwyth	130	165	**University of Warwick**	25 March 2007

=== Semifinals ===
Team 1	Score		Team 2	Broadcast Date
**University of Manchester**	240	90	Durham University	1 April 2007
University College London	85	235	**University of Warwick**	8 April 2007

=== Final ===
Team 1	Score		Team 2	Broadcast Date
University of Manchester	140	170	**University of Warwick**	16 April 2007

- The trophy and title were awarded to the Warwick team of Rory Gill, Harold Wyber, Daisy Christodoulou, and Prakash Patel. They beat a Manchester team of Tim Hawken, Adam Clark, Ciaran Lavin, and David Elliott in the final.
- The trophy was presented by Ann Widdecombe.
- Daisy Christodoulou reappeared on the programme, again representing Warwick, in a Christmas special edition in December 2011, this time alongside Vadim Jean, captain Christian Wolmar and Carla Mendonça. In the first round, Warwick won with a score of 225, giving them a place in the semi-finals, in which the team scored 265, securing their place in the final. In the final, the team secured a much lower score of 60, and lost out to Trinity College, Cambridge. In the first round, Christodoulou answered the most starter-for-ten questions out of both teams, and in the semi-final, she also answered many starter questions correctly.
