= University Challenge 1997–98 =

Series 27 of University Challenge ran between 10 September 1997 and 21 April 1998. This was the last series to use the 27-episode format. The winning team were Magdalen College, Oxford, who were the first team to successfully defend their title.

== Results ==
- Winning teams are highlighted in **bold**.
- Teams with green scores (winners) returned in the next round, while those with red scores (losers) were eliminated.
- Teams with orange scores have lost, but survived as highest scoring losers.
- A score in italics indicates a match decided on a tie-breaker question.

=== First round ===
Team 1	Score		Team 2	Broadcast Date
**University of Edinburgh**	190	180	Jesus College, Cambridge	10 September 1997
**Birkbeck, University of London**	245	195	University of Wales, Cardiff	17 September 1997
University of Exeter	175	180	**Robinson College, Cambridge**	24 September 1997
**Magdalen College, Oxford**	225	185	King's College, London	1 October 1997
University of Sheffield	145	265	**University of Aberdeen**	8 October 1997
Christ Church, Oxford	155	175	**The Open University**	15 October 1997
University of Liverpool	130	220	**Newnham College, Cambridge**	22 October 1997
**Queen's University, Belfast**	300	70	Medical College of St Bartholomew's Hospital	29 October 1997
**Magdalene College, Cambridge**	215	90	St Catherine's College, Oxford	4 November 1997
St John's College, Oxford	130	175	**London School of Economics**	11 November 1997
**Oxford Brookes University**	230	135	University of Warwick	18 November 1997
New Hall, Cambridge	35	335	**University of Nottingham**	2 December 1997

=== Second round ===
Team 1	Score		Team 2	Broadcast Date
University of Exeter	140	275	**Jesus College, Cambridge**	9 December 1997
King's College, London	215	230	**University of Nottingham**	16 December 1997
Newnham College, Cambridge	120	320	**University of Edinburgh**	6 January 1998
**Birkbeck, University of London**	215	170	Robinson College, Cambridge	13 January 1998
**London School of Economics**	245	40	Oxford Brookes University	20 January 1998
**University of Wales, Cardiff**	275	105	University of Aberdeen	27 January 1998
Magdalene College, Cambridge	140	155	**Queen's University, Belfast**	3 February 1998
The Open University	235	265	**Magdalen College, Oxford**	24 February 1998

=== Quarter-finals ===
Team 1	Score		Team 2	Broadcast Date
Jesus College, Cambridge	220	250	**University of Nottingham**	4 March 1998
University of Edinburgh	205	275	**Birkbeck, University of London**	11 March 1998
**London School of Economics**	225	115	Queen's University, Belfast	18 March 1998
University of Wales, Cardiff	80	375	**Magdalen College, Oxford**	25 March 1998

=== Semi-finals ===
Team 1	Score		Team 2	Broadcast Date
University of Nottingham	205	240	**Birkbeck, University of London**	7 April 1998
London School of Economics	85	265	**Magdalen College, Oxford**	14 April 1998

=== Final ===
Team 1	Score		Team 2	Broadcast Date
Birkbeck, University of London	195	225	**Magdalen College, Oxford**	21 April 1998

- The trophy and title were awarded to the Magdalen team of Paul O'Donnell, Phil Jones, Sarah Fitzpatrick and Alex de Jongh.
- The trophy was presented by Richard Dawkins.
