= University Challenge 2005–06 =

British television quiz programme

Series 35 of University Challenge began on 19 September 2005 and was broadcast on BBC Two. This is a list of the matches played, their scores, and outcomes.

== Main draw ==
- Winning teams are highlighted in **bold**.
- Teams with green scores (winners) returned in the next round, while those with red scores (losers) were eliminated.
- Teams with orange scores have lost, but survived as highest scoring losers.
- Teams with black scores have been disqualified.

=== First round ===
Team 1	Score		Team 2	Broadcast Date
St Hugh's College, Oxford	190	240	**University of Manchester**	19 September 2005
**University of Wales, Lampeter**	160	125	University of Exeter	26 September 2005
Magdalen College, Oxford	70	320	**Trinity Hall, Cambridge**	3 October 2005
**University of Liverpool**	275	70	University of Hull	10 October 2005
**St Hilda's College, Oxford**	165	130	Durham University	17 October 2005
**University of Birmingham**	125	115	University of Strathclyde	7 November 2005
Lucy Cavendish College, Cambridge	110	160	**University of Hertfordshire**	14 November 2005
University of Sheffield	100	235	**University of Sussex**	21 November 2005
University of Edinburgh	110	275	**Gonville and Caius College, Cambridge**	28 November 2005
St John's College, Oxford	130	165	**Trinity College, Cambridge**	4 December 2005
**School of Oriental and African Studies**	205	95	Christ's College, Cambridge	11 December 2005
**Churchill College, Cambridge**	170	120	University of York	18 December 2005
**London Business School**	170	130	Trinity College, Oxford	8 January 2006
**University of Nottingham**	245	135	Imperial College School of Medicine	15 January 2006

==== Highest Scoring Losers Playoffs ====
Team 1	Score		Team 2	Broadcast Date
**St John's College, Oxford**	190	125	St Hugh's College, Oxford	22 January 2006
**Imperial College School of Medicine**	205	145	Trinity College, Oxford	29 January 2006

=== Second round ===
Team 1	Score		Team 2	Broadcast Date
**School of Oriental and African Studies**	200	170	Churchill College, Cambridge	5 February 2006
**London Business School**	185	160	University of Nottingham	12 February 2006
St John's College, Oxford	170	175	**Imperial College School of Medicine**	19 February 2006
**University of Liverpool**	195	170	Trinity College, Cambridge	26 February 2006
**Trinity Hall, Cambridge**	255	95	University of Birmingham	5 March 2006
**Gonville and Caius College, Cambridge**	175	160	University of Sussex	12 March 2006
**University of Manchester**	255	45	St Hilda's College, Oxford	19 March 2006
University of Wales, Lampeter	140	145	**University of Hertfordshire**	26 March 2006

=== Quarterfinals ===
Team 1	Score		Team 2	Broadcast Date
**London Business School**	215	145	Gonville and Caius College, Cambridge	2 April 2006
**University of Manchester**	275	140	Imperial College School of Medicine	9 April 2006
School of Oriental and African Studies	155	225	**Trinity Hall, Cambridge**	16 April 2006
**University of Liverpool**	195	140	University of Hertfordshire	23 April 2006

=== Semifinals ===
Team 1	Score		Team 2	Broadcast Date
London Business School	60	250	**University of Manchester**	30 April 2006
**Trinity Hall, Cambridge**	200	140	University of Liverpool	8 May 2006

=== Final ===
Team 1	Score		Team 2	Broadcast Date
**University of Manchester**	160	150	Trinity Hall, Cambridge	15 May 2006

- The trophy and title were awarded to the Manchester team of Chris Holmes, Gareth Aubrey, Joseph Meagher, and Adrian Anslow.
- The trophy was presented by Peter Ackroyd.
