= University Challenge 2013–14 =

British television series

Series 43 of University Challenge began on 15 July 2013 on BBC Two.

== Results ==
- Winning teams are highlighted in **bold**.
- Teams with green scores (winners) returned in the next round, while those with red scores (losers) were eliminated.
- Teams with orange scores must win one more match to return in the next round (current highest scoring losers, teams that won their first quarter-final match, teams that won their second quarter-final match having lost their first, or teams that won their first quarter-final match and lost their second).
- Teams with yellow scores indicate that two further matches must be played and won (teams that lost their first quarter-final match).
- A score in italics indicates a match decided on a tie-breaker question.

=== First round ===
Team 1	Score		Team 2	Total	Broadcast date
University of Aberdeen	105	140	**Queen's University Belfast**	245	15 July 2013
St John's College, Cambridge	120	180	**University of Reading**	300	22 July 2013
**Trinity College, Cambridge**	300	150	Christ Church, Oxford	450	29 July 2013
Durham University	170	190	**Queens' College, Cambridge**	360	5 August 2013
Loughborough University	155	195	**Clare College, Cambridge**	350	12 August 2013
**SOAS University of London**	230	155	University of Southampton	385	19 August 2013
Brasenose College, Oxford	105	215	**University of Manchester**	320	26 August 2013
Keele University	40	295	**University of Liverpool**	335	2 September 2013
Balliol College, Oxford	145	250	**Peterhouse, Cambridge**	395	9 September 2013
**University of York**	270	70	University of Bath	340	16 September 2013
Pembroke College, Cambridge	145	255	**Somerville College, Oxford**	400	23 September 2013
**Cardiff University**	145	95	University of Exeter	240	30 September 2013
St John's College, Oxford	115	260	**Downing College, Cambridge**	375	7 October 2013
Aberystwyth University	110	230	**Bangor University**	340	14 October 2013

==== Highest scoring losers play-offs ====
Team 1	Score		Team 2	Total	Broadcast date
Durham University	140	245	**Christ Church, Oxford**	385	21 October 2013
**University of Southampton**	185	80	Loughborough University	265	28 October 2013

=== Second round ===
Team 1	Score		Team 2	Total	Broadcast date
University of York	135	240	**Somerville College, Oxford**	375	4 November 2013
Downing College, Cambridge	135	210	**Queen's University Belfast**	345	11 November 2013
**Clare College, Cambridge**	175	165	Christ Church, Oxford	340	18 November 2013
Bangor University	60	335	**University of Southampton**	395	25 November 2013
**Trinity College, Cambridge**	240	110	Peterhouse, Cambridge	350	2 December 2013
**University of Manchester**	325	110	Queens' College, Cambridge	435	9 December 2013
University of Liverpool	145	230	**Cardiff University**	375	16 December 2013
University of Reading	90	240	**SOAS University of London**	330	6 January 2014

=== Quarter-finals ===
Team 1	Score		Team 2	Total	Broadcast date
**Trinity College, Cambridge**	285	205	University of Manchester	490	13 January 2014
Cardiff University	90	200	**SOAS University of London**	290	20 January 2014
**Somerville College, Oxford**	195	160	Clare College, Cambridge	355	27 January 2014
Queen's University Belfast	90	290	**University of Southampton**	380	3 February 2014
**Trinity College, Cambridge**	280	105	SOAS University of London	385	10 February 2014
**University of Manchester**	195	105	Cardiff University	300	17 February 2014
**Somerville College, Oxford**	215	95	University of Southampton	310	24 February 2014
Clare College, Cambridge	105	125	**Queen's University Belfast**	230	3 March 2014
**University of Manchester**	200	80	University of Southampton	280	10 March 2014
**SOAS University of London**	165	145	Queen's University Belfast	310	17 March 2014

=== Semi-finals ===
Team 1	Score		Team 2	Total	Broadcast date
**Trinity College, Cambridge**	260	175	University of Manchester	435	24 March 2014
**Somerville College, Oxford**	190	105	SOAS University of London	295	31 March 2014

=== Final ===
Team 1	Score		Team 2	Total	Broadcast date
**Trinity College, Cambridge**	240	135	Somerville College, Oxford	375	7 April 2014

- The trophy and title were awarded to the Trinity team of Matthew Ridley, Filip Drnovšek Zorko, Ralph Morley, and Richard Freeland.
- The trophy was presented by Jeanette Winterson.

== Spin-off: Christmas Special 2013 ==
Each year, a Christmas special sequence is aired featuring distinguished alumni. Out of 7 first-round winners, the top 4 highest-scoring teams progress to the semi-finals. The teams consist of celebrities who represent their alma maters.

=== Results ===
- Winning teams are highlighted in **bold**.
- Teams with green scores (winners) returned in the next round, while those with red scores (losers) were eliminated.
- Teams with grey scores won their match but did not achieve a high enough score to proceed to the next round.
- A score in italics indicates a match decided on a tie-breaker question.

First Round

Team 1	Score		Team 2	Total	Broadcast date
University of Reading	85	185	**Emmanuel College, Cambridge**	270	20 December 2013
University of Kent	100	160	**Lancaster University**	260	21 December 2013
**Keele University**	140	95	Aberystwyth University	235	23 December 2013
**Gonville and Caius College, Cambridge**	255	65	Christ Church, Oxford	320	26 December 2013
**St Hugh's College, Oxford**	125	95	University of Stirling	220	27 December 2013
**University of Leicester**	125	60	University of Sussex	185	30 December 2013
King's College London	105	185	**University of Southampton**	290	31 December 2013

==== Standings for the winners ====
Rank	Team	Team captain	Score
1	Gonville and Caius College, Cambridge	Mark Damazer	255
2=	Emmanuel College, Cambridge	Simon Singh	185
2=	University of Southampton	Stefan Buczacki	185
4	Lancaster University	Roger Ashton-Griffiths	160
5	Keele University	Ian Moncrieff	140
6=	St Hugh's College, Oxford	Suzy Klein	125
6=	University of Leicester	Sue Cook	125

Semi-finals

Team 1	Score		Team 2	Total	Broadcast date
**Emmanuel College, Cambridge**	185	105	University of Southampton	290	1 January 2014
Lancaster University	145	180	**Gonville and Caius College, Cambridge**	325	2 January 2014

Final

Team 1	Score		Team 2	Total	Broadcast date
Emmanuel College, Cambridge	140	175	**Gonville and Caius College, Cambridge**	315	3 January 2014

The Gonville and Caius College, Cambridge team of Quentin Stafford-Fraser, Helen Castor, Mark Damazer and Lars Tharp beat Emmanuel College, Cambridge and their team of Hugo Rifkind, Mary-Ann Ochota, Simon Singh and Rory McGrath.
