= University Challenge 2021–22 =

Season of a television programme

The 51st series of University Challenge began on 12 July 2021 on BBC Two. The final aired on 4 April 2022 when Imperial College London and the University of Reading were declared the series winners and runners-up respectively.

In this series, the University of Dundee made its debut appearance in the BBC series.

== Results ==
- Winning teams are highlighted in **bold**.
- Teams with green scores (winners) returned in the next round, while those with red scores (losers) were eliminated (as it was impossible for them to be in the highest scoring losers).
- Teams with orange scores had to win one more match to return in the next round.
- Teams with yellow scores indicate that two further matches had to be played and won (teams that lost their first quarter-final match).
- A score in italics indicates a match decided on a tie-breaker question.

=== First round ===
| Team 1 | Score | | Team 2 | Total | Broadcast date |
|---|---|---|---|---|---|
| **King's College London** | 115 | 100 | University of Glasgow | 215 | 12 July 2021 |
| University College London | 135 | 140 | **St Hilda's College, Oxford** | 275 | 19 July 2021 |
| London Business School | 100 | 180 | **Hertford College, Oxford** | 280 | 26 July 2021 |
| Emmanuel College, Cambridge | 135 | 140 | **University of St Andrews** | 275 | 2 August 2021 |
| **Queen Mary University of London** | 115 | 90 | Oxford Brookes University | 205 | 9 August 2021 |
| University of Strathclyde | 110 | 175 | **University of Reading** | 285 | 16 August 2021 |
| University of Durham | 90 | 190 | **Trinity College, Cambridge** | 280 | 23 August 2021 |
| **University of Exeter** | 130 | 80 | University of Manchester | 210 | 30 August 2021 |
| **University of Edinburgh** | 270 | 80 | Peterhouse, Cambridge | 350 | 6 September 2021 |
| St John's College, Cambridge | 155 | 210 | **Imperial College London** | 365 | 13 September 2021 |
| **St Catharine's College, Cambridge** | 130 | 120 | University College, Oxford | 250 | 20 September 2021 |
| **University of Dundee** | 145 | 135 | Royal Northern College of Music | 280 | 27 September 2021 |
| Wolfson College, Oxford | 110 | 165 | **University of Bristol** | 275 | 4 October 2021 |
| **University of Birmingham** | 245 | 10 | University of Sussex | 255 | 11 October 2021 |

==== Highest scoring losers play-offs ====
| Team 1 | Score | | Team 2 | Total | Broadcast date |
|---|---|---|---|---|---|
| University College London | 170 | 175 | **St John's College, Cambridge** | 345 | 18 October 2021 |
| **Emmanuel College, Cambridge** | 180 | 115 | Royal Northern College of Music | 295 | 25 October 2021 |

=== Second round ===
| Team 1 | Score | | Team 2 | Total | Broadcast date |
|---|---|---|---|---|---|
| **St John's College, Cambridge** | 220 | 45 | Queen Mary University of London | 265 | 1 November 2021 |
| **Emmanuel College, Cambridge** | 125 | 120 | St Catharine's College, Cambridge | 245 | 8 November 2021 |
| **University of Edinburgh** | 185 | 175 | University of Bristol | 360 | 15 November 2021 |
| St Hilda's College, Oxford | 45 | 235 | **Trinity College, Cambridge** | 280 | 22 November 2021 |
| **University of Reading** | 245 | 50 | University of Dundee | 295 | 29 November 2021 |
| **King's College London** | 165 | 115 | Hertford College, Oxford | 280 | 6 December 2021 |
| **University of Birmingham** | 225 | 50 | University of St Andrews | 275 | 13 December 2021 |
| University of Exeter | 70 | 205 | **Imperial College London** | 275 | 3 January 2022 |

=== Quarterfinals ===
| Team 1 | Score | | Team 2 | Total | Broadcast date |
|---|---|---|---|---|---|
| **University of Reading** | 170 | 135 | University of Birmingham | 305 | 10 January 2022 |
| King's College London | 50 | 235 | **Imperial College London** | 285 | 17 January 2022 |
| St John's College, Cambridge | 140 | 155 | **Emmanuel College, Cambridge** | 295 | 24 January 2022 |
| **University of Edinburgh** | 230 | 95 | Trinity College, Cambridge | 325 | 31 January 2022 |
| University of Birmingham | 115 | 140 | **King's College London** | 255 | 7 February 2022 |
| University of Reading | 120 | 225 | **Imperial College London** | 345 | 14 February 2022 |
| Emmanuel College, Cambridge | 145 | 150 | **University of Edinburgh** | 295 | 21 February 2022 |
| **St John's College, Cambridge** | 155 | 125 | Trinity College, Cambridge | 280 | 28 February 2022 |
| King's College London | 80 | 85 | **Emmanuel College, Cambridge** | 165 | 7 March 2022 |
| **University of Reading** | 145 | 70 | St John's College, Cambridge | 215 | 14 March 2022 |

=== Semifinals ===
| Team 1 | Score | | Team 2 | Total | Broadcast date |
|---|---|---|---|---|---|
| **Imperial College London** | 170 | 65 | Emmanuel College, Cambridge | 235 | 21 March 2022 |
| University of Edinburgh | 115 | 145 | **University of Reading** | 260 | 28 March 2022 |

=== Final ===
| Team 1 | Score | | Team 2 | Total | Broadcast date |
|---|---|---|---|---|---|
| **Imperial College London** | 125 | 115 | University of Reading | 240 | 4 April 2022 |

In what was the most closely fought final since 2006 (when the University of Manchester beat Trinity Hall, Cambridge also by ten points), Imperial had leads of 90 to 25 and 105 to 45 before Reading fought back to take a narrow 120 to 105 lead. Max Zeng (Imperial) then narrowly beat the Reading captain Michael Hutchinson to a starter on the Brecon Beacons, after which Imperial took two bonuses and a five-point lead in the process. A five-point penalty for Reading was the final change in the scoreline before the gong.

- The trophy and title were thus awarded to the Imperial team of Max Zeng, Fatima Sheriff, Michael Mays, and Gilbert Jackson.
- The trophy was presented by Russian-born Dutch-British physicist Andre Geim.

== Spin-off: Christmas Special 2021 ==
=== First round ===
Each year, a Christmas special sequence is aired featuring distinguished alumni. Out of 7 first-round winners, the top 4 highest-scoring teams progress to the semi-finals. The teams consist of celebrities who represent their alma maters.

- Winning teams are highlighted in **bold**.
- Teams with green scores (winners) returned in the next round, while those with red scores (losers) were eliminated.
- Teams with grey scores won their match but did not achieve a high enough score to proceed to the next round.
- A score in italics indicates a match decided on a tie-breaker question.

| Team 1 | Score | | Team 2 | Total | Broadcast date |
|---|---|---|---|---|---|
| **University of Edinburgh** | 160 | 125 | University of Leicester | 285 | 20 December 2021 |
| University of Winchester | 95 | 130 | **University of Bradford** | 225 | 21 December 2021 |
| University of Bristol | 95 | 125 | **King's College, Cambridge** | 220 | 22 December 2021 |
| London School of Economics | 75 | 130 | **Hertford College, Oxford** | 205 | 23 December 2021 |
| Corpus Christi College, Cambridge | 130 | 145 | **St Anne's College, Oxford** | 275 | 24 December 2021 |
| **Birkbeck, University of London** | 125 | 30 | University of Portsmouth | 155 | 27 December 2021 |
| **University of Kent** | 115 | 95 | Goldsmiths, University of London | 210 | 28 December 2021 |

==== Standings for the winners ====
| Rank | Team | Team captain | Score |
|---|---|---|---|
| 1 | University of Edinburgh | Miles Jupp | 160 |
| 2 | St Anne's College, Oxford | John Robins | 145 |
| 3= | University of Bradford | Martin Roberts | 130 |
| 3= | Hertford College, Oxford | Adam Fleming | 130 |
| 5= | King's College, Cambridge | Shahidha Bari | 125 |
| 5= | Birkbeck, University of London | Jolyon Maugham | 125 |
| 7 | University of Kent | Peter White | 115 |

=== Semi-finals ===
| Team 1 | Score | | Team 2 | Total | Broadcast date |
|---|---|---|---|---|---|
| **University of Edinburgh** | 145 | 125 | University of Bradford | 270 | 29 December 2021 |
| **Hertford College, Oxford** | 155 | 95 | St Anne's College, Oxford | 250 | 30 December 2021 |

=== Final ===
| Team 1 | Score | | Team 2 | Total | Broadcast date |
|---|---|---|---|---|---|
| **University of Edinburgh** | 235 | 95 | Hertford College, Oxford | 330 | 31 December 2021 |

The winning University of Edinburgh team consisted of Catherine Slessor, Thomasina Miers, Miles Jupp and Phil Swanson. The second placed Hertford College team consisted of Soweto Kinch, Elizabeth Norton, Adam Fleming and Isabelle Westbury.
