= University Challenge 2026–27 =

Season of a television programme

The 56th series of University Challenge began on 13 July 2026 on BBC Two.

== Results ==
- Winning teams are highlighted in **bold**.
- Teams with green scores (winners) returned in the next round, while those with red scores (losers) were eliminated.
- Teams with orange scores had to win one more match to return in the next round.
- Teams with yellow scores indicate that two further matches had to be played and won (teams that lost their first quarter-final match).
- A score in italics indicates a match decided on a tie-breaker question.

=== First round ===
Team 1	Score		Team 2	Total	Broadcast date
University of Bristol	160	220	**Imperial College London**	380	13 July 2026
Durham University	120	190	**University of Manchester**	310	20 July 2026
**University College, Oxford**	200	170	St John's College, Cambridge	370	27 July 2026
Guildhall School of Music and Drama	155	165	**Darwin College, Cambridge**	320	3 August 2026
Magdalen College, Oxford	40	300	**University of Warwick**	340	10 August 2026
**University of Bath**	215	50	City St George's, University of London	265	17 August 2026
**Pembroke College, Cambridge**	180	90	University of St Andrews	270	24 August 2026
London School of Economics	160	185	**King's College, Cambridge**	345	31 August 2026
**University of Birmingham**	190	125	University of Leicester	315	7 September 2026
**University College London**	210	115	Royal College of Art	325	14 September 2026
**University of Southampton**	200	195	Queen's University Belfast	395	21 September 2026
**Emmanuel College, Cambridge**	190	105	Somerville College, Oxford	295	28 September 2026
**University of Glasgow**	235	90	Goldsmiths, University of London	325	5 October 2026
**SOAS University of London**	240	80	University of Edinburgh	320	12 October 2026

=== Highest scoring losers play-offs ===
Team 1	Score		Team 2	Total	Broadcast date
**St John's College, Cambridge**	220	100	London School of Economics	320	19 October 2026
**University of Bristol**	205	135	Queen's University Belfast	340	26 October 2026

=== Second round ===
Team 1	Score		Team 2	Total	Broadcast date
St John's College, Cambridge	170	275	**Pembroke College, Cambridge**	445	2 November 2026
University of Glasgow	165	205	**University of Southampton**	370	9 November 2026
University of Bristol			University of Bath		23 November 2026
University of Manchester			University of Warwick		30 November 2026
SOAS University of London			Emmanuel College, Cambridge		7 December 2026
					14 December 2026

=== Quarter-finals ===
Team 1	Score	Team 2	Total	Broadcast date

=== Semi-finals ===
Team 1	Score	Team 2	Total	Broadcast date

=== Final ===
Team 1	Score	Team 2	Total	Broadcast date
