= University Challenge 2001–02 =

Series 31 of University Challenge began on 23 July 2001, with the final on 11 March 2002.

== Results ==
- Winning teams are highlighted in **bold**.
- Teams with green scores (winners) returned in the next round, while those with red scores (losers) were eliminated.
- Teams with orange scores have lost, but survived as the first round losers with the highest losing scores.
- A score in italics indicates a match decided on a tie-breaker question.

=== First round ===
Team 1	Score		Team 2	Broadcast date
University of Hull	185	300	**Somerville College, Oxford**	23 July 2001
London School of Economics	140	180	**University of Bristol**	30 July 2001
University of Edinburgh	150	190	**Christ's College, Cambridge**	6 August 2001
**University of Salford**	155	130	University of Leicester	13 August 2001
**Christ Church, Oxford**	235	100	University of Birmingham	20 August 2001
**Wadham College, Oxford**	235	120	Cranfield University	3 September 2001
University of Nottingham	125	215	**Keele University**	10 September 2001
**Imperial College London**	250	110	De Montfort University	17 September 2001
Magdalen College, Oxford	140	210	**Trinity College, Cambridge**	24 September 2001
Cardiff University	145	200	**University College London**	1 October 2001
Downing College, Cambridge	220	230	**Newcastle University**	8 October 2001
University of St Andrews	40	215	**Churchill College, Cambridge**	15 October 2001
**Durham University**	200	140	University of York	22 October 2001
**St Hugh's College, Oxford**	220	145	University of Leeds	29 October 2001

NOTE: Even though both Cardiff and Leeds scored 145 points, Leeds reached their total "in a shorter time, and with fewer wrong answers".

==== Highest Scoring Losers Playoffs ====
Team 1	Score		Team 2	Broadcast date
**Downing College, Cambridge**	205	195	University of Leeds	5 November 2001
**University of Edinburgh**	230	150	University of Hull	12 November 2001

=== Second round ===
Team 1	Score		Team 2	Broadcast date
**Newcastle University**	265	145	University of Salford	19 November 2001
**University of Edinburgh**	220	130	Wadham College, Oxford	26 November 2001
**St Hugh's College, Oxford**	190	140	Churchill College, Cambridge	3 December 2001
Christ Church, Oxford	170	285	**Imperial College London**	10 December 2001
**Somerville College, Oxford**	290	100	Durham University	17 December 2001
**Downing College, Cambridge**	180	155	University of Bristol	7 January 2002
Trinity College, Cambridge	200	250	**University College London**	14 January 2002
**Christ's College, Cambridge**	285	40	Keele University	21 January 2002

=== Quarter-finals ===
Team 1	Score		Team 2	Broadcast date
Newcastle University	115	290	**University of Edinburgh**	28 January 2002
St Hugh's College, Oxford	135	270	**Imperial College London**	4 February 2002
**Somerville College, Oxford**	270	145	Downing College, Cambridge	11 February 2002
University College London	155	190	**Christ's College, Cambridge**	18 February 2002

=== Semi-finals ===
Team 1	Score		Team 2	Broadcast date
University of Edinburgh	120	270	**Imperial College London**	25 February 2002
**Somerville College, Oxford**	180	170	Christ's College, Cambridge	4 March 2002

=== Final ===
Team 1	Score		Team 2	Broadcast date
Imperial College London	185	200	**Somerville College, Oxford**	11 March 2002

- The trophy and title were awarded to the Somerville team of Luke Pitcher, Dorjana Širola, Tim Austen, and Vicki Wood.
- The trophy was presented by Mary Warnock.
