= University Challenge 1998–99 =

Series 28 of University Challenge ran between 2 September 1998 and 27 April 1999.

This was the first series to use the 31-episode format.

== Results ==
- Winning teams are highlighted in **bold**.
- Teams with green scores (winners) returned in the next round, while those with red scores (losers) were eliminated.
- Teams with orange scores have lost, but survived as highest scoring losers.
- A score in italics indicates a match decided on a tie-breaker question.

=== First round ===
Team 1	Score		Team 2	Broadcast Date
**University of Bristol**	245	185	Victoria University of Manchester	2 September 1998
Balliol College, Oxford	195	200	**University of Durham**	9 September 1998
**The Open University**	350	145	University of Lancaster	16 September 1998
Harris Manchester College, Oxford	185	200	**Selwyn College, Cambridge**	23 September 1998
**Birkbeck, University of London**	300	110	University of Warwick	30 September 1998
University of Portsmouth	135	230	**De Montfort University**	7 October 1998
King's College London School of Medicine and Dentistry	130	170	**Magdalen College, Oxford**	14 October 1998
**University of Aberdeen**	255	145	Newnham College, Cambridge	20 October 1998
Christ Church, Oxford	150	245	**Trinity College, Cambridge**	27 October 1998
St Hilda's College, Oxford	115	215	**University of Wales, Bangor**	3 November 1998
Corpus Christi College, Cambridge	145	280	**Oriel College, Oxford**	10 November 1998
Queen's University, Belfast	100	230	**University of Sheffield**	17 November 1998
Downing College, Cambridge	160	235	**University of Glasgow**	1 December 1998
City University	200	210	**University of Leicester**	8 December 1998

==== Highest Scoring Losers play-offs ====
Team 1	Score		Team 2	Broadcast Date
Harris Manchester College, Oxford	185	200	**Victoria University of Manchester**	15 December 1998
City University	210	300	**Balliol College, Oxford**	5 January 1999

=== Second round ===
Team 1	Score		Team 2	Broadcast Date
**The Open University**	210	200	Magdalen College, Oxford	12 January 1999
University of Aberdeen	75	275	**University of Wales, Bangor**	19 January 1999
De Montfort University	135	255	**University of Bristol**	26 January 1999
Selwyn College, Cambridge	145	325	**University of Leicester**	9 February 1999
**Oriel College, Oxford**	290	170	Victoria University of Manchester	16 February 1999
University of Glasgow	140	355	**University of Durham**	23 February 1999
Balliol College, Oxford	205	270	**Birkbeck, University of London**	3 March 1999
University of Sheffield	190	255	**Trinity College, Cambridge**	10 March 1999

=== Quarter-finals ===
Team 1	Score		Team 2	Broadcast Date
**University of Wales, Bangor**	240	170	University of Bristol	17 March 1999
**Oriel College, Oxford**	335	160	University of Leicester	24 March 1999
**The Open University**	240	235	Birkbeck, University of London	31 March 1999
**University of Durham**	325	175	Trinity College, Cambridge	6 April 1999

=== Semi-finals ===
Team 1	Score		Team 2	Broadcast Date
University of Wales, Bangor	130	235	**Oriel College, Oxford**	13 April 1999
**The Open University**	310	120	University of Durham	20 April 1999

=== Final ===
Team 1	Score		Team 2	Broadcast Date
Oriel College, Oxford	210	265	**The Open University**	27 April 1999

- The trophy and title were awarded to the Open team of Lance Haward, David Good, John Burke and Sue Mitchell.
- The trophy was presented by Jeremy Paxman.
- Salman Rushdie had been due to present the trophy, but the recording of the semi-finals and final were postponed after Paxman fell ill, and he wasn't available for the rescheduled dates.
