= University Challenge 2007–08 =

British television quiz programme

Series 37 of University Challenge began on 9 July 2007 and was broadcast on BBC Two. This is a list of the matches played, their scores, and outcomes.

== Main draw ==
- Winning teams are highlighted in **bold**.
- Teams with green scores (winners) returned in the next round, while those with red scores (losers) were eliminated.
- Teams with orange scores have lost, but survived as highest scoring losers.
- Teams with black scores have been disqualified.

=== First round ===
Team 1	Score		Team 2	Broadcast Date
**University of Nottingham**	240	185	University of Lancaster	9 July 2007
**School of Oriental and African Studies**	165	160	Magdalen College, Oxford	16 July 2007
**University of Leeds**	225	165	University of Liverpool	23 July 2007
University of Birmingham	145	200	**University of St Andrews**	30 July 2007
St Cross College, Oxford	110	255	**Trinity Hall, Cambridge**	7 August 2007
University of Central Lancashire	90	265	**University of Sheffield**	14 August 2007
Lucy Cavendish College, Cambridge	130	225	**University of Warwick**	21 August 2007
**Worcester College, Oxford**	160	130	Pembroke College, Cambridge	28 August 2007
Bangor University	105	130	**University of Edinburgh**	4 September 2007
Durham University	120	255	**St Edmund Hall, Oxford**	11 September 2007
Jesus College, Cambridge	140	215	**University of Exeter**	18 September 2007
**University of Manchester**	260	105	University of Newcastle	25 September 2007
St George's, University of London	130	175	**University of York**	1 October 2007
**Christ Church, Oxford**	245	65	Homerton College, Cambridge	8 October 2007

==== Highest Scoring Losers Playoffs ====
Team 1	Score		Team 2	Broadcast Date
University of Lancaster	50	315	**University of Birmingham**	15 October 2007
University of Liverpool	100	185	**Magdalen College, Oxford**	22 October 2007

=== Second round ===
Team 1	Score		Team 2	Broadcast Date
School of Oriental and African Studies	110	155	**University of Exeter**	12 November 2007
University of York	130	205	**University of St Andrews**	19 November 2007
University of Birmingham	200	210	**Magdalen College, Oxford**	26 November 2007
University of Leeds	195	230	**University of Warwick**	3 December 2007
**University of Manchester**	210	170	St Edmund Hall, Oxford	10 December 2007
**University of Sheffield**	270	135	University of Edinburgh	17 December 2007
University of Nottingham	180	305	**Christ Church, Oxford**	7 January 2008
**Trinity Hall, Cambridge**	220	50	Worcester College, Oxford	14 January 2008

=== Quarterfinals ===
Team 1	Score		Team 2	Broadcast Date
**University of Manchester**	195	150	Trinity Hall, Cambridge	21 January 2008
**Christ Church, Oxford**	255	170	University of Warwick	28 January 2008
University of St Andrews	115	180	**Magdalen College, Oxford**	4 February 2008
**University of Sheffield**	305	155	University of Exeter	11 February 2008

=== Semifinals ===
Team 1	Score		Team 2	Broadcast Date
University of Manchester	170	220	**Christ Church, Oxford**	18 February 2008
Magdalen College, Oxford	165	275	**University of Sheffield**	25 February 2008

=== Final ===
Team 1	Score		Team 2	Broadcast Date
**Christ Church, Oxford**	220	170	University of Sheffield	3 March 2008

- The trophy and title were awarded to the Christ Church team of Alex Bubb, Charles Markland, Max Kaufman, and Susannah Darby.
- The trophy was presented by Joan Bakewell.
- In March 2009, it was revealed that Charles Markland, a member of the winning team from Christ Church, Oxford, had transferred his studies to Balliol College halfway through the series. He claimed that his team captain had contacted a researcher concerning the situation, and had been told that this was not a problem and that the same team should be maintained for continuity purposes.
