= Michael Taylor (historian) =

Irish historian and cricketer (born 1988)

Personal information
- Full name: Michael Hugh Taylor
- Born: 6 December 1988 (age 37); Ballymena, County Antrim
- Batting: Right-handed
- Bowling: Legbreak
- Role: Bowler

Domestic team information
- Years: Team
- 2008–2014: Cambridge MCCU
- 2009–2015: Ballymena Cricket Club
- Source: ESPNcricinfo, 1 May 2016

Michael Hugh Taylor (born 6 December 1988) is an Irish historian and a former first-class cricketer who played for Cambridge University Cricket Club from 2008 to 2014. Following his academic studies in history, Taylor has written two popular books on aspects of nineteenth-century history, and contributed to public debate on Britain's role in slavery.

== Education ==
Born at Ballymena, County Antrim, Taylor studied at Cambridge University from 2007 to 2015. He was a student at Gonville and Caius College, where he studied for a B.A., an M.Phil. and a Ph.D. in history. Taylor's PhD thesis titled The defence of British Colonial Slavery, 1823-33, was awarded in 2015. As a student, Taylor played cricket for Cambridge University Cricket Club, from 2008 to 2014. He earned a Blue for cricket in 2010, by representing Cambridge in the annual Oxford-Cambridge cricket matches. He was also a member of the Gonville and Caius team that won the televised quiz competition, University Challenge, in 2015.

== Career ==
After completing his doctoral studies, Taylor was a lecturer in Modern British History at Balliol College, Oxford, and a Visiting Fellow at the British Library's Eccles Centre for American Studies. In 2018, he reached the final of Mastermind, a televised quiz show.

Taylor has published three books. His first was An Independent Empire: Diplomacy & War in the Making of the United States published in 2020 with political scientist Michael S. Kochin. His second, also published in 2020, was The Interest: How the British Establishment Resisted the Abolition of Slavery. This book was shortlisted for the Orwell Prize in political writing in 2021.

In March 2024, he published his third book, Impossible Monsters. This is a popular history of the arguments about science and religion that followed the discoveries of fossilised bones and skeletons of primordial creatures, including Plesiosaurus, Megalosaurus and Dimorphodon, during the early 19th century.

Taylor works for PwC, as a senior manager in their indirect tax disputes section.

== Published books ==
=== Academic ===
- Kochin, Michael S, and Taylor, Michael (2020) An Independent Empire: Diplomacy & War in the Making of the United States, University of Michigan Press, ISBN 978-0472074402

=== Trade books ===
- Taylor, Michael (2020) The Interest: How the British Establishment Resisted the Abolition of Slavery, The Bodley Head, 400 pp. ISBN 9781847925718
- Taylor, Michael (2024) Impossible Monsters: Dinosaurs, Darwin and the War Between Science and Religion, The Bodley Head, 496pp. ISBN 9781847926784
