= University Challenge 2000–01 =

Series 30 of University Challenge began on 4 September 2000, with the final on 2 April 2001.

== Results ==
- Winning teams are highlighted in **bold**.
- Teams with green scores (winners) returned in the next round, while those with red scores (losers) were eliminated.
- Teams with orange scores have lost, but survived as the first round losers with the highest losing scores.
- A score in italics indicates a match decided on a tie-breaker question.

=== First round ===
Team 1	Score		Team 2	Broadcast date
**University of Hull**	225	205	University of Edinburgh	4 September 2000
Wycliffe Hall, Oxford	180	215	**University of Sheffield**	11 September 2000
University of Birmingham	115	325	**University of Durham**	18 September 2000
Magdalene College, Cambridge	85	335	**University College, Oxford**	19 September 2000
**University College London**	265	150	New College, Oxford	25 September 2000
**Sheffield Hallam University**	265	170	University of Bristol	26 September 2000
University of Southampton	120	240	**Newnham College, Cambridge**	2 October 2000
University of Aberdeen	145	210	**University of York**	9 October 2000
St John's College, Oxford	195	255	**Birkbeck College, London**	16 October 2000
**University of Manchester**	240	125	Sidney Sussex College, Cambridge	23 October 2000
University of Manchester Institute of Science and Technology	110	315	**Balliol College, Oxford**	30 October 2000
**Queens' College, Cambridge**	170	145	University of Wales College of Medicine	6 November 2000
Cranfield University	80	255	**Imperial College London**	13 November 2000
**University of Warwick**	200	150	Peterhouse, Cambridge	20 November 2000

==== Highest Scoring Losers Playoffs ====
Team 1	Score		Team 2	Broadcast date
Wycliffe Hall, Oxford	110	220	**University of Bristol**	27 November 2000
**St John's College, Oxford**	300	145	University of Edinburgh	4 December 2000

=== Second round ===
Team 1	Score		Team 2	Broadcast date
Birkbeck College, London	210	220	**University College, Oxford**	11 December 2000
**Sheffield Hallam University**	180	135	University of Warwick	18 December 2000
Queens' College, Cambridge	145	170	**St John's College, Oxford**	8 January 2001
Newnham College, Cambridge	155	200	**University of Bristol**	15 January 2001
University of York	150	270	**Balliol College, Oxford**	22 January 2001
**University of Hull**	250	240	University of Sheffield	29 January 2001
University of Durham	140	215	**Imperial College London**	4 February 2001
University College London	105	250	**University of Manchester**	11 February 2001

An error in the scoring led to University College Oxford going through to the quarterfinals instead of Birkbeck College – University College was not penalised for an incorrect interruption.

=== Quarter-finals ===
Team 1	Score		Team 2	Broadcast date
**University College, Oxford**	285	160	Sheffield Hallam University	19 February 2001
**St John's College, Oxford**	210	175	University of Bristol	26 February 2001
Balliol College, Oxford	160	210	**University of Hull**	5 March 2001
**Imperial College London**	225	195	University of Manchester	12 March 2001

=== Semi-finals ===
Team 1	Score		Team 2	Broadcast date
University College, Oxford	105	220	**St John's College, Oxford**	19 March 2001
University of Hull	145	260	**Imperial College London**	26 March 2001

=== Final ===
Team 1	Score		Team 2	Broadcast date
St John's College, Oxford	195	250	**Imperial College London**	2 April 2001

- The trophy and title were awarded to the Imperial team of Siegfried Hodgson, John Douglas, Gavin Estcourt, and Alexander Campbell.
- The trophy was presented by the then-Poet Laureate Andrew Motion.
