= University Challenge 2009–10 =

Series 39 of University Challenge began on 6 July 2009 and aired on BBC Two. This is the first series to use the current 37-episode format. Below is a list of the matches played with their scores and outcomes.

== Schedule ==
The series comprised 37 matches over five rounds, airing between July 2009 and April 2010.

Round	Dates	Matches	Teams	Change
First Round	6 July 2009 – 26 October 2009	14 + 2	28	28→16
Second Round	2 November 2009 – 21 December 2009	8	16	16→8
Quarter-finals	4 January 2010 – 15 March 2010	8 + 2	8	8→4
Semi-finals	22 March 2010 – 29 March 2010	2	4	4→2

== Format ==
The format of the show changed for the first time in many years. The quarter-finals were not a straight knock-out competition but involved a variant on the Swiss pairs format. Each of the eight teams that reached the quarter-final stage played two matches. Any team who won both of these matches progressed immediately to the semi-final; any team losing both were eliminated from the competition. The four remaining teams engaged in an additional play-off round for the other two semi-final places.

== Results ==
- Winning teams are highlighted in **bold**.
- Teams with green scores (winners) returned in the next round, while those with red scores (losers) were eliminated.
- Orange scores indicate a further match must be played and won (highest scoring first round losers, teams that won their first quarter final match, teams that won their second quarter final match having lost their first, or teams that won their first quarter final match and lost their second).
- Yellow scores indicate that two further matches must be played and won (teams that lost their first quarter final match).
- A score in italics indicates a match decided on a tie-breaker question.

=== First round ===
Team 1	Score		Team 2	Total	Broadcast Date
Christ's College, Cambridge	170	200	**University of Warwick**	370	6 July 2009
Royal Veterinary College	60	235	**University of Manchester**	295	13 July 2009
**Loughborough University**	205	175	University College London	380	20 July 2009
Clare College, Cambridge	165	215	**Jesus College, Oxford**	380	27 July 2009
University of Nottingham	145	180	**Girton College, Cambridge**	325	3 August 2009
**University of Edinburgh**	170	155	University of Central Lancashire	325	10 August 2009
**King's College London**	155	140	Cardiff University	295	24 August 2009
**Newnham College, Cambridge**	260	120	University of Sussex	380	31 August 2009
**Imperial College London**	175	135	University of Southampton	310	7 September 2009
**St John's College, Oxford**	270	90	Durham University	360	14 September 2009
Magdalene College, Cambridge	135	145	**St Hugh's College, Oxford**	270	21 September 2009
University of York	55	200	**St George's, University of London**	255	28 September 2009
**University of St Andrews**	255	150	Somerville College, Oxford	405	5 October 2009
Emmanuel College, Cambridge	165	205	**Regent's Park College, Oxford**	370	12 October 2009

==== Highest Scoring Losers play-offs ====
Team 1	Score		Team 2	Total	Broadcast Date
**University College London**	220	145	Clare College, Cambridge	365	19 October 2009
Christ's College, Cambridge	105	280	**Emmanuel College, Cambridge**	385	26 October 2009

=== Second round ===
Team 1	Score		Team 2	Total	Broadcast Date
**Girton College, Cambridge**	170	160	St George's, University of London	330	2 November 2009
Newnham College, Cambridge	110	185	**University of St Andrews**	295	9 November 2009
**St John's College, Oxford**	220	190	Loughborough University	410	16 November 2009
University College London	185	260	**Emmanuel College, Cambridge**	445	23 November 2009
**Imperial College London**	280	80	St Hugh's College, Oxford	360	30 November 2009
**Jesus College, Oxford**	200	170	University of Warwick	370	7 December 2009
**University of Edinburgh**	170	150	Regent's Park College, Oxford	320	14 December 2009
**University of Manchester**	210	90	King's College London	300	21 December 2009

=== Quarter-finals ===
Team 1	Score		Team 2	Total	Broadcast Date
**St John's College, Oxford**	280	55	Girton College, Cambridge	335	4 January 2010
University of St Andrews	50	195	**University of Manchester**	245	11 January 2010
**Imperial College London**	240	110	University of Edinburgh	350	18 January 2010
Jesus College, Oxford	125	280	**Emmanuel College, Cambridge**	405	25 January 2010
**St John's College, Oxford**	150	140	University of Manchester	290	1 February 2010
**Girton College, Cambridge**	140	115	University of St Andrews	255	8 February 2010
Imperial College London	160	275	**Emmanuel College, Cambridge**	435	15 February 2010
**University of Edinburgh**	195	185	Jesus College, Oxford	380	22 February 2010
**University of Manchester**	170	165	University of Edinburgh	335	1 March 2010
Girton College, Cambridge	100	200	**Imperial College London**	300	15 March 2010

=== Semi-finals ===
Team 1	Score		Team 2	Total	Broadcast Date
**St John's College, Oxford**	260	170	Imperial College London	430	22 March 2010
**Emmanuel College, Cambridge**	315	120	University of Manchester	435	29 March 2010

=== Final ===
Team 1	Score		Team 2	Total	Broadcast Date
St John's College, Oxford	100	315	**Emmanuel College, Cambridge**	415	5 April 2010

- The trophy and title were awarded to the Emmanuel team of Andy Hastings, Jenny Harris, Alexander Guttenplan, and Josh Scott.
- The trophy was presented by Carol Ann Duffy.
