= University Challenge 2003–04 =

Series 33 of University Challenge began on 15 September 2003, with the final on 12 April 2004.

== Results ==
- Winning teams are highlighted in **bold**.
- Teams with green scores (winners) returned in the next round, while those with red scores (losers) were eliminated.
- Teams with orange scores have lost, but survived as the first round losers with the highest losing scores.
- A score in italics indicates a match decided on a tie-breaker question.

=== First round ===
Team 1	Score		Team 2	Broadcast date
St Hugh's College, Oxford	150	195	**University of Strathclyde**	15 September 2003
University of Hull	160	180	**Bangor University**	22 September 2003
Corpus Christi College, Cambridge	80	150	**Royal Northern College of Music**	29 September 2003
St John's College, Oxford	175	235	**London Metropolitan University**	6 October 2003
University of Edinburgh	115	155	**University of Warwick**	13 October 2003
**Jesus College, Cambridge**	270	90	Oriel College, Oxford	20 October 2003
**Queen's College, Oxford**	140	105	Imperial College London	27 October 2003
University of Nottingham	110	160	**Magdalen College, Oxford**	3 November 2003
University of Bristol	70	225	**Durham University**	10 November 2003
Wolfson College, Cambridge	135	140	**University of Sussex**	17 November 2003
University of Reading	140	210	**Gonville and Caius College, Cambridge**	24 November 2003
**St Edmund's College, Cambridge**	165	120	London School of Economics	1 December 2003
**University of St Andrews**	195	75	City University London	8 December 2003
University of Bradford	35	280	**Queen's University Belfast**	15 December 2003

==== Highest Scoring Losers Playoffs ====
Team 1	Score		Team 2	Broadcast date
**St John's College, Oxford**	140	125	University of Hull	22 December 2003
St Hugh's College, Oxford	140	155	**University of Reading**	29 December 2003

=== Second round ===
Team 1	Score		Team 2	Broadcast date
**Magdalen College, Oxford**	165	130	University of Sussex	5 January 2004
**University of St Andrews**	200	105	Queen's University Belfast	12 January 2004
**Gonville and Caius College, Cambridge**	195	140	University of Strathclyde	19 January 2004
**St John's College, Oxford**	215	190	University of Reading	26 January 2004
Queen's College, Oxford	150	180	**Royal Northern College of Music**	2 February 2004
**Jesus College, Cambridge**	225	110	Bangor University	9 February 2004
**London Metropolitan University**	150	140	Durham University	16 February 2004
University of Warwick	80	180	**St Edmund's College, Cambridge**	23 February 2004

=== Quarter-finals ===
Team 1	Score		Team 2	Broadcast date
**Magdalen College, Oxford**	190	130	Royal Northern College of Music	1 March 2004
St Edmund's College, Cambridge	50	225	**University of St Andrews**	8 March 2004
**Gonville and Caius College, Cambridge**	180	165	St John's College, Oxford	15 March 2004
**London Metropolitan University**	225	210	Jesus College, Cambridge	22 March 2004

=== Semi-finals ===
Team 1	Score		Team 2	Broadcast date
**Magdalen College, Oxford**	265	85	University of St Andrews	29 March 2004
**Gonville and Caius College, Cambridge**	220	190	London Metropolitan University	5 April 2004

=== Final ===
Team 1	Score		Team 2	Broadcast date
**Magdalen College, Oxford**	190	160	Gonville and Caius College, Cambridge	12 April 2004

- The trophy and title were awarded to the Magdalen team of Dave Cox, Matt Holdcroft, Freya McClements, and Josh Spero.
- The trophy was presented by Bill Bryson.
