= University Challenge 2002–03 =

Series 32 of University Challenge began on 2 September 2002, with the final on 31 March 2003.

It also marked the 40th anniversary of the show’s formation.

== Results ==
- Winning teams are highlighted in **bold**.
- Teams with green scores (winners) returned in the next round, while those with red scores (losers) were eliminated.
- Teams with orange scores have lost, but survived as the first round losers with the highest losing scores.
- A score in italics indicates a match decided on a tie-breaker question.

=== First round ===
Team 1	Score		Team 2	Broadcast date
**Newcastle University**	205	180	University of York	2 September 2002
University of Manchester Institute of Science and Technology	165	200	**Clare College, Cambridge**	9 September 2002
University College London	165	175	**Jesus College, Oxford**	16 September 2002
University of Liverpool	130	265	**Worcester College, Oxford**	23 September 2002
Selwyn College, Cambridge	160	180	**Merton College, Oxford**	30 September 2002
**University of Leeds**	230	135	Liverpool John Moores University	7 October 2002
**Cranfield University**	175	165	Brasenose College, Oxford	14 October 2002
Middlesex University	70	200	**University of Manchester**	21 October 2002
**University of Sheffield**	180	125	Homerton College, Cambridge	28 October 2002
**University of Nottingham**	225	105	University of Wales, Aberystwyth	4 November 2002
**Birkbeck, University of London**	230	185	Emmanuel College, Cambridge	11 November 2002
**Durham University**	190	115	Queens' College, Cambridge	18 November 2002
**University of Warwick**	275	140	Wadham College, Oxford	25 November 2002
**University of Southampton**	190	125	University of Edinburgh	2 December 2002

==== Highest Scoring Losers Playoffs ====
Team 1	Score		Team 2	Broadcast date
University of Manchester Institute of Science and Technology	150	205	**University College London**	9 December 2002
**Emmanuel College, Cambridge**	205	150	University of York	16 December 2002

=== Second round ===
Team 1	Score		Team 2	Broadcast date
Newcastle University	80	215	**Worcester College, Oxford**	23 December 2002
**University of Warwick**	225	145	University of Southampton	30 December 2002
**University College London**	330	125	Emmanuel College, Cambridge	6 January 2003
**Durham University**	225	180	Jesus College, Oxford	13 January 2003
**Birkbeck, University of London**	190	130	Clare College, Cambridge	20 January 2003
**Cranfield University**	190	175	University of Manchester	27 January 2003
**University of Leeds**	170	165	University of Nottingham	3 February 2003
**University of Sheffield**	195	125	Merton College, Oxford	10 February 2003

=== Quarter-finals ===
Team 1	Score		Team 2	Broadcast date
University College London	145	220	**Birkbeck, University of London**	17 February 2003
University of Warwick	175	180	**University of Sheffield**	24 February 2003
**Cranfield University**	165	160	Durham University	3 March 2003
**University of Leeds**	230	130	Worcester College, Oxford	10 March 2003

=== Semi-finals ===
Team 1	Score		Team 2	Broadcast date
**Birkbeck, University of London**	190	155	University of Sheffield	17 March 2003
**Cranfield University**	200	125	University of Leeds	24 March 2003

=== Final ===
Team 1	Score		Team 2	Broadcast date
**Birkbeck, University of London**	180	155	Cranfield University	31 March 2003

- The trophy and title were awarded to the Birkbeck team of Tony Walsh, Thor Halland, Tony Gillham, and Colum Gallivan.
- The trophy was presented by Benjamin Zephaniah.
