= University Challenge 2017–18 =

Series 47 of University Challenge began on 17 July 2017 on BBC Two.

In this series, Ulster University made its debut appearance in the BBC era of the programme, having last appeared in the Bamber Gascoigne era in the 1980s. Sheffield Hallam University made only its second appearance since 2001.

== Results ==
- Winning teams are highlighted in **bold**.
- Teams with green scores (winners) returned in the next round, while those with red scores (losers) were eliminated.
- Teams with orange scores had to win one more match to return in the next round.
- Teams with yellow scores indicate that two further matches had to be played and won (teams that lost their first quarter-final match).
- A score in italics indicates a match decided on a tie-breaker question.

=== First round ===
Team 1	Score		Team 2	Total	Broadcast date
**University of Edinburgh**	165	160	Ulster University	325	17 July 2017
Trinity College, Cambridge	95	230	**University of Bristol**	325	24 July 2017
**University of Southampton**	280	40	Cardiff University	320	31 July 2017
St Edmund's College, Cambridge	105	185	**Magdalen College, Oxford**	290	14 August 2017
University of York	80	240	**University of Warwick**	320	21 August 2017
**Oxford Brookes University**	175	85	The Courtauld Institute of Art	260	28 August 2017
**Trinity College, Oxford**	160	145	University College London	305	4 September 2017
Sheffield Hallam University	40	170	**Newcastle University**	210	11 September 2017
University of Leicester	105	200	**Fitzwilliam College, Cambridge**	305	18 September 2017
Imperial College London	125	145	**University of Strathclyde**	270	25 September 2017
**Emmanuel College, Cambridge**	170	155	St Hugh's College, Oxford	325	2 October 2017
University of St Andrews	120	255	**St John's College, Cambridge**	375	9 October 2017
**Corpus Christi College, Cambridge**	225	135	St Anne's College, Oxford	360	16 October 2017
**Merton College, Oxford**	285	110	King's College London	395	23 October 2017

==== Highest Scoring Losers play-offs ====
Team 1	Score		Team 2	Total	Broadcast date
**Ulster University**	175	90	St Anne's College, Oxford	265	30 October 2017
**University College London**	315	45	St Hugh's College, Oxford	360	6 November 2017

=== Second round ===
Team 1	Score		Team 2	Total	Broadcast date
University of Strathclyde	105	170	**Emmanuel College, Cambridge**	275	13 November 2017
**St John's College, Cambridge**	285	80	Corpus Christi College, Cambridge	365	20 November 2017
University of Warwick	140	170	**Ulster University**	310	27 November 2017
University College London	165	170	**University of Edinburgh**	335	4 December 2017
**University of Bristol**	205	100	Trinity College, Oxford	305	18 December 2017
**Newcastle University**	215	130	University of Southampton	345	8 January 2018
**Fitzwilliam College, Cambridge**	200	155	Magdalen College, Oxford	355	15 January 2018
Oxford Brookes University	175	255	**Merton College, Oxford**	430	22 January 2018

=== Quarter-finals ===
Team 1	Score		Team 2	Total	Broadcast date
University of Bristol	130	225	**Newcastle University**	355	29 January 2018
Fitzwilliam College, Cambridge	125	270	**Merton College, Oxford**	395	5 February 2018
**St John's College, Cambridge**	185	130	Ulster University	315	12 February 2018
**University of Edinburgh**	125	110	Emmanuel College, Cambridge	235	19 February 2018
Newcastle University	135	160	**St John's College, Cambridge**	295	26 February 2018
**University of Bristol**	205	45	Ulster University	250	5 March 2018
**Merton College, Oxford**	210	85	University of Edinburgh	295	12 March 2018
**Fitzwilliam College, Cambridge**	175	150	Emmanuel College, Cambridge	325	19 March 2018
University of Bristol	60	195	**University of Edinburgh**	255	26 March 2018
**Newcastle University**	205	65	Fitzwilliam College, Cambridge	270	2 April 2018

=== Semi-finals ===
Team 1	Score		Team 2	Total	Broadcast date
**St John's College, Cambridge**	270	60	University of Edinburgh	330	9 April 2018
**Merton College, Oxford**	215	110	Newcastle University	325	16 April 2018

=== Final ===
Team 1	Score		Team 2	Total	Broadcast date
**St John's College, Cambridge**	145	100	Merton College, Oxford	245	23 April 2018

- The trophy and title were awarded to the St John's team of John-Clark Levin, Rosie McKeown, James Devine-Stoneman, and Matt Hazell.
- The trophy was presented by Judith Weir.

== Spin-off: Christmas Special 2017 ==
=== Qualification round ===
Each year, a Christmas special sequence is aired featuring distinguished alumni. Out of 7 first-round winners, the top 4 highest-scoring teams progress to the semi-finals. The teams consist of celebrities who represent their alma maters.

- Teams with green scores won their match and achieved a high enough score to return in the next round, teams with red scores lost and were eliminated.
- Teams with grey scores won their first round match but did not achieve a high enough score to return.

Team 1			Team 2	Total	Broadcast date
University of Durham	35	220	Keble College, Oxford	255	24 December 2017
Selwyn College, Cambridge	145	90	University of St Andrews	235	26 December 2017
University of York	70	150	University of Southampton	220	27 December 2017
University of Leicester	45	175	University College London	220	28 December 2017
St John's College, Cambridge	155	40	St Edmund Hall, Oxford	195	29 December 2017
Queen Mary University of London	110	60	Cardiff University	170	1 January 2018
Brunel University London	45	155	University of Reading	200	2 January 2018

==== Standings for the winners ====
Rank	Team	Team captain	Score
1	Keble College, Oxford	Katy Brand	220
2	University College London	Jane Dacre	175
3=	St John's College, Cambridge	Giles Foden	155
3=	University of Reading	Sophie Walker	155
5	University of Southampton	John Wilson	150
6	Selwyn College, Cambridge	David Wilson	145
7	Queen Mary University of London	Adrian Chiles	110

=== Semi-finals ===
Team 1	Score		Team 2	Total	Broadcast date
Keble College, Oxford	160	105	St John's College, Cambridge	265	3 January 2018
University College London	125	130	University of Reading	255	4 January 2018

=== Final ===
Team 1	Score		Team 2	Total	Broadcast date
Keble College, Oxford	240	0	University of Reading	240	5 January 2018

The winning Keble College, Oxford team consisted of Paul Johnson, Frank Cottrell-Boyce, Katy Brand and Anne-Marie Imafidon, who beat the University of Reading team of Anna Machin, Martin Hughes-Games, Sophie Walker and Pippa Greenwood.
