= Daisy Christodoulou =

British educationalist

Daisy Christodoulou is Director of Education at No More Marking, an online engine which aims to help teachers with comparative-judgement assessment of school work. Before this she was head of education research at the charity Ark, where she continues to be involved in an advisory capacity.

== Background ==
Christodoulou grew up in London and attended the University of Warwick. She first gained attention for appearing on University Challenge as the captain of the Warwick team, which won the 2006-2007 series. She was trained as a secondary English teacher under the Teach First programme.

After leaving university, she wrote the book Seven Myths about Education which suggests that declarative knowledge such as facts is being neglected in modern education because of the priority given to procedural knowledge such as skills. Her second book, Making Good Progress? The future of Assessment for Learning, was published in 2017. She has also taught in two comprehensive schools in London.

Christodoulou is also an advocate of curriculum reform and education assessment reform. In 2017 she was named by Anthony Seldon as one of "The 20 most influential figures in British Education".
