= Academy Transformation Trust =

UK multi academy trust

- Abbreviation: ATT
- Formation: 14 November 2011; 14 years ago
- Founder: Ian Cleland
- Type: Multi-academy trust
- Registration no.: 07846852
- Legal status: Charitable company limited by guarantee
- Headquarters: Emmanuel Court, Sutton Coldfield, Birmingham
- Region served: East of England, South East England, East Midlands, West Midlands
- Members: 21 academies (Note: One special academy, nine primary academies, nine secondary academies, one all-through academy and one sixth form academy) (2022)
- Chair: Pat Beanland
- CEO: Sir Nick Weller
- Revenue: £74 million (2021)
- Staff: 1,857 (2022)
- Students: 12,339 (2022)
- Website: Academy Transformation Trust

The Academy Transformation Trust (ATT), or alternatively the Academies Transformation Trust, is a multi-academy trust administering 21 academy schools across 10 local authority areas in England. It operates in the East of England, South East England, East Midlands and West Midlands.

== History ==
The Academy Transformation Trust was incorporated on 14 November 2011 and was founded by its then-CEO Ian Cleland as a member of Sir David Bell's Transformation Trust. Cleland was also the CEO of the Ormiston Academies Trust. It sponsored its first academy, Jubilee Academy Mossley, in August 2012 and subsequently grew throughout the 2012/2013 academic year. The trust had 14 member schools by the end of August 2013, with two more joining in September 2013, leaving a total of 16 schools in the trust. At this time, the trust claimed to be one of the largest multi-academy trusts in England.

In February 2014 the government barred 14 multi-academy trusts, including the Academy Transformation Trust, from sponsoring any more academies or free schools because of their poor performance. The Academy Transformation Trust's ban was lifted in December 2014, causing opposition from an organisation that was against academisation. After the ban was lifted, ATT CEO Ian Cleland planned to continue expanding the trust's membership.

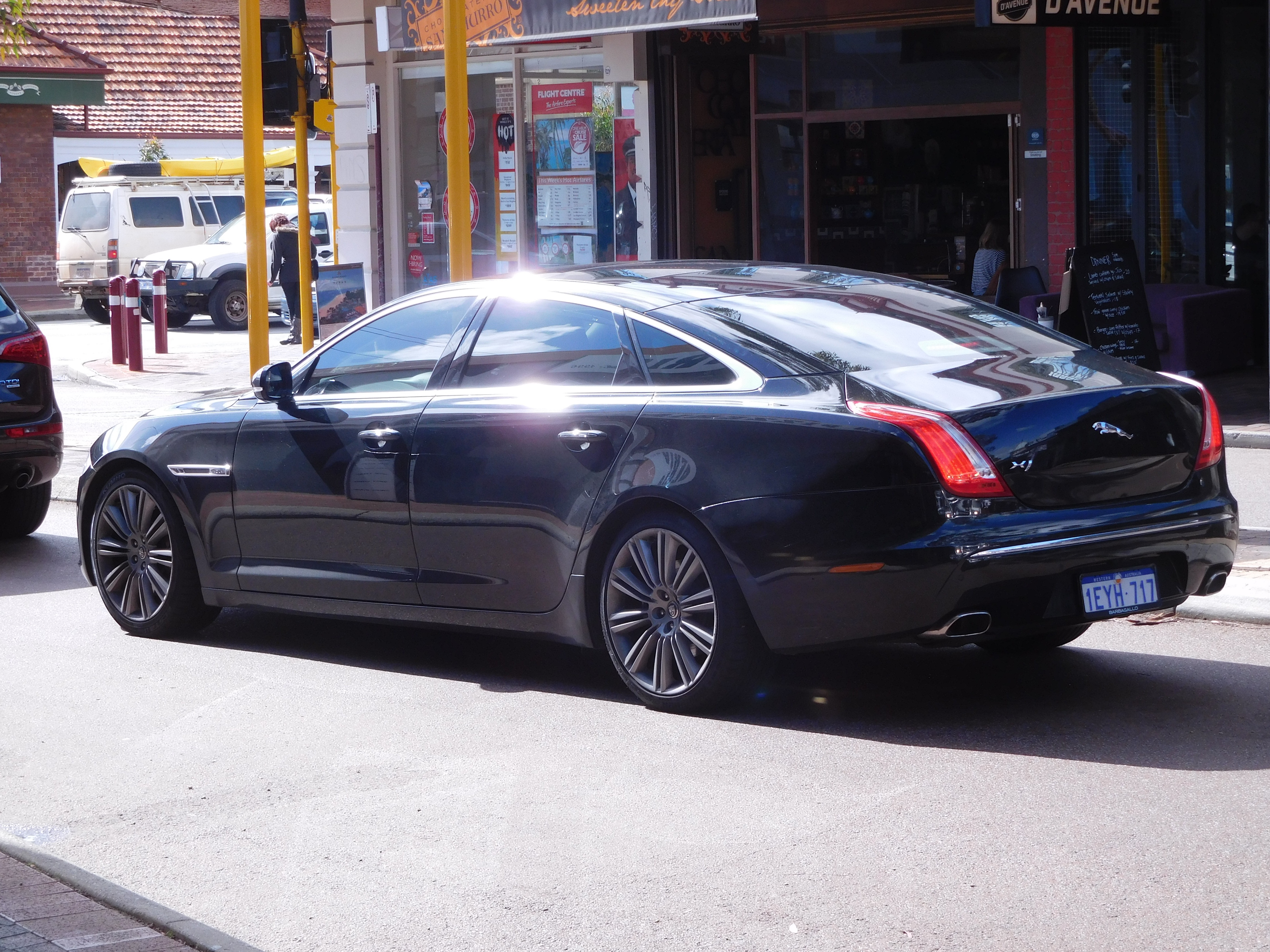
An XJ Premium Luxury Jaguar car in 2015. Cleland hired a V6 model of this car with taxpayers' money

By May 2016 the trust's membership had grown to 21 schools. At this time, the trust had warned over 100 of its schools' staff that they might lose their jobs or be made to reapply with a lower salary as a result of spending cuts. Trade union Unison claimed that the trust was trying to save £500,000 and also criticised CEO Ian Cleland's high salary of at least £180,000. A Channel 4 and Observer investigation later found in July that the trust had used £3,000 of taxpayers' money for Cleland's hire car and also £3,000 for "first-class rail travel and meals at top restaurants", despite Cleland having stated during May's spending cuts that the trust was suffering from "significant financial challenges". A trust spokesman defended Cleland, stating that his car was part of "his remuneration package. Ian's role requires significant, regular travel throughout the regions where our academies are based, hence the maintenance costs". The money spent on restaurants was also claimed to be for staff and teacher events.

Cleland and the trust's managing director Joyce Hodgetts went on an unexplained leave of absence in November 2016. Cleland returned by 21 December 2016.

=== EFA investigation ===
The Education Funding Agency (EFA) investigated the trust after its chair and board of trustees claimed there to be financial mismanagement and breaches of the Academies Financial Handbook within the trust. The investigation's findings were published in March 2017; multiple breaches were found.

It was revealed that Cleland's leave of absence in November 2016 had been ordered by the chair due to significant concerns about his performance and behaviour and also due to inadequate financial management at the trust, which led to a significant reduction in trust reserves and subsequent financial difficulties. Cleland responded by using his powers as the trust's founder to dismiss the chair both from his position and as a trustee. He also used these powers to replace four trustees who had resigned. The new trustees were not independently appointed and one of them became the new chair. They reinstated Cleland and raised his salary by 1%. The EFA found that the removal of the previous chair in this manner was "not considered to be in accordance with the spirit of the Academies Financial Handbook" and that Cleland had an "inherent" conflict of interest. The new chair claimed that the decisions made by the new trustees were the result of an independent investigation into Cleland and the previous chair's claims, however the EFA could not find any evidence of such an investigation taking place.

The EFA's investigation concluded with a demand that the trust "undertake an independent review of governance arrangements, including the issues highlighted during our work and confirm in an action plan to the EFA how the required improvements will be managed." In a statement, Cleland claimed that the trust had "welcomed both the review and the findings, in particular guidance on how to improve current strategic and operational structures", further adding that "ATT were compliant with the governance structure stipulated within their company documents, EFA guidance on best practice has significantly changed over time". Cleland also said that the trust's view on the report was to read it "in light of the transformational impact which ATT has had on the schools within The Trust. 90% of their secondary academies are good and 75% of their primary academies with none being rated inadequate. This is compared to a significant number being in special measures when they joined ATT and only 10% rated good." Cleland resigned shortly after making this statement, but had returned as CEO by July 2017.

=== Post-investigation ===
The EFA's investigation into the trust led to calls for more ministerial scrutiny against CEOs of multi-academy trusts who were considered too powerful. Multi-academy trusts led by a converter academy were the most likely to have these CEOs, however many began restructuring their systems of governance after the investigation into the ATT. One example of this system being retained was the Seckford Foundation Free Schools Trust in Suffolk, where the accounting officer was also a member and trustee. Sir David Carter, the National Schools Commissioner, warned of a "blurring of the edges of accountability” in these cases where CEOs were also trustees.

By November 2017, there were 23 schools in the trust. Ian Cleland resigned again as CEO in this month, but had remained employed by the trust as of February 2018, when it was looking for a replacement. The trust fell into a £2.5 million deficit in this month, with the ESFA (which had replaced the EFA) providing it with financial support. A new CEO, Debbie Clinton, was appointed in September 2018. Clinton was also the acting CEO at the Diverse Academies Learning Partnership, a multi-academy trust with around 9,000 students.

According to Clinton, the Academy Transformation Trust was "a bit loony" when she became its CEO, with "significant debt, 4 CFOs in as many years, management that wasn’t fit for purpose" and "very poor systems". The trust's school membership was largely decentralised, leading to a lack of collaboration between them. This resulted in unequal standards between many of its schools, with some performing well whilst others were falling behind. Clinton reorganised the trust on regional lines, introduced a school improvement plan which the trust had lacked previously and also presided over a turnaround of the trust's deficit from £2.9 million at the end of 2018 to a £2 million surplus at the end of 2019, although the trust still had a debt which was expected by Clinton to be paid back in the summer of 2021.

Clinton stepped down as CEO on 21 September 2021. Derek Trimmer briefly took over from her until 30 September, when Richard Elms became the CEO the next day. He served in an interim term. Sir Nick Weller took over as the permanent CEO on 1 November 2022, having stepped down from his previous position as CEO of the Dixons Academies Trust after serving for 16 years.

== Corporate affairs ==
=== Structure and legal status ===
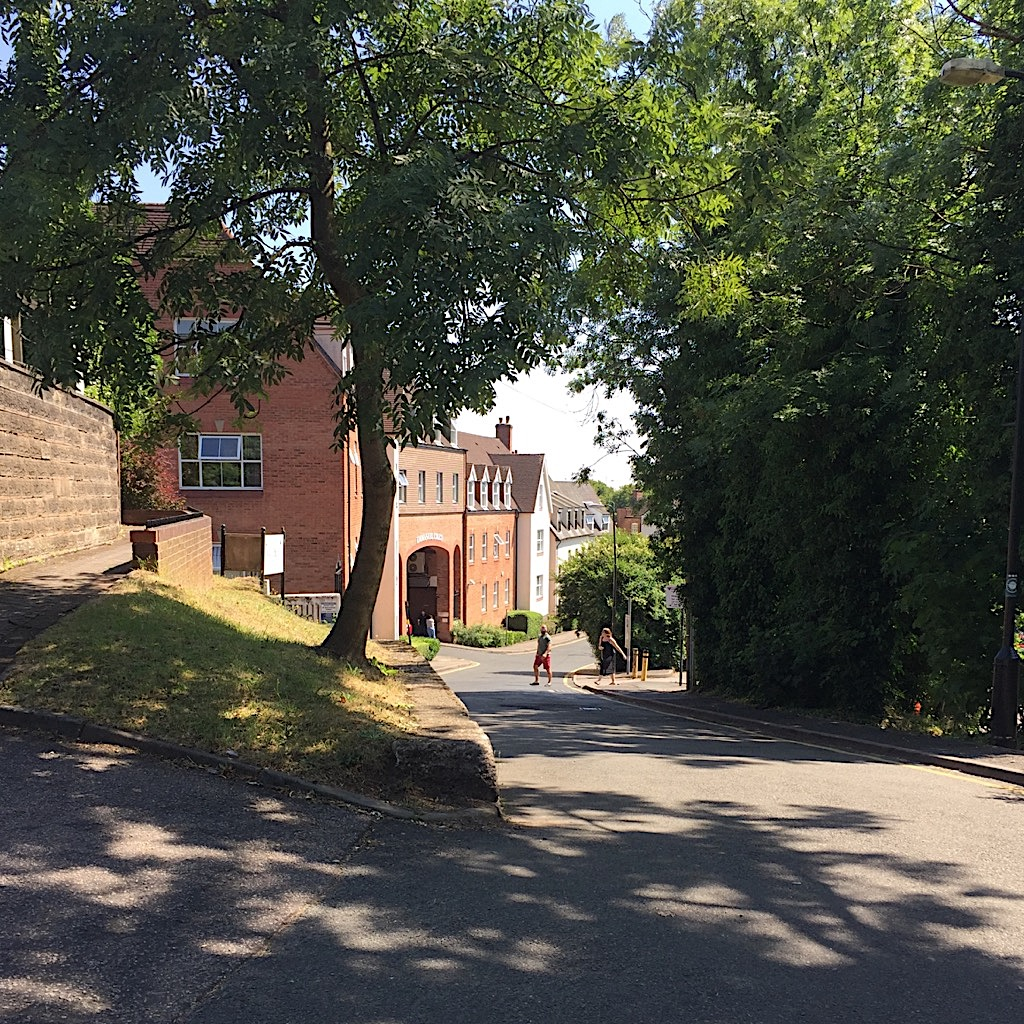
Emmanuel Court, the trust's registered office, is the orange bricked building in the distance

The Academy Transformation Trust is a charitable company limited by guarantee with exempt charity status. This means it is regulated by the Secretary of State for Education and is exempt from registration with, and oversight by, the Charity Commission for England and Wales. It is a multi-academy trust responsible for the operation and maintenance of its member schools. It must follow the stipulations of the Academies Financial Handbook and its funding agreement with the Secretary of State for Education. The trust's constitution and goals are covered by its Memorandum and Articles of Association.

The trust also has trustees who are also its directors for the purposes of corporate law. They sit on the board of trustees, the major governing organ of the trust, and are either co-opted into their posts by other trustees or appointed by the trust's members, which are its main non-executive overseers. Trustees scrutinise the CEO, the local governing bodies of the trust's member schools and also the board of trustee's subcommittees, and do this on behalf of the Secretary of State for Education, the trust's members and the localities that the trust covers. The CEO is appointed by the board of trustees and administers daily operations at the trust, while investing some of his powers to the trust's school principals so that they can manage daily operations in their schools. Each member school has a local governing body made up of at least one member of its staff and two parent governors. These bodies scrutinise the standards of their schools.

=== Operational scope ===
The trust is registered in England and Wales and operates in the following English regions: the East of England, South East England, East Midlands and West Midlands. Its 21 academies are spread across 10 local authority areas. In 2020 these were Thurrock, Essex, Norfolk, Suffolk, Staffordshire, Nottinghamshire, Warwickshire, Sandwell, Walsall and Stoke.

=== Further education ===
The Academy Transformation Trust runs the Academy Transformation Trust Further Education College (ATTFE College), an academy status sixth form college and independent training provider with four campuses in Nottinghamshire. It was formed from the academy conversion of the Sutton Centre Community College and The Dukeries College, which have since joined the trust, and is based out of these schools. In its most recent Ofsted inspection, which was in June 2017, the college was given a grade of Good, having previously been graded Requires Improvement.

The college's provision is concentrated in the former north Nottinghamshire coalfields where unemployment is above the national average. It offers apprenticeships, GCSE qualifications for English and mathematics, NCFE qualifications, NVQ qualifications, A-Level qualifications, BTEC diplomas and higher education diplomas.

== Academies ==
As of 2022, the trust currently has 21 academies, they are:

=== Primary ===
- Beck Row Primary Academy, Beck Row
- Caldmore Primary Academy, Walsall
- Great Heath Academy, Mildenhall
- Jubilee Academy Mossley, Bloxwich
- Great Heath Academy, Mildenhall
- Kingsmoor Academy, Harlow
- North Walsall Primary Academy, Walsall
- Ravens Academy, Clacton-on-Sea
- Star Academy Sandyford, Tunstall
- Sun Academy Bradwell, Bradwell

=== Secondary ===
- Bristnall Hall Academy, Oldbury
- Mildenhall College Academy, Mildenhall
- Pool Hayes Academy, Willenhall
- Sutton Community Academy, Sutton-in-Ashfield
- The Dukeries Academy, New Ollerton
- The Hathaway Academy, Grays
- The Nicholas Hamond Academy, Swaffham
- The Queen Elizabeth Academy, Atherstone
- Westbourne Academy, Ipswich

=== Sixth form ===
- Academy Transformation Trust Further Education College (ATTFE College), Ollerton

=== Special ===
- Phoenix Academy, Leamore

=== All-through ===
- Iceni Academy, Methwold and Hockwold

== Former academies ==
=== Primary ===
- Admirals Academy, Thetford
- Diamond Academy, Thetford
- Norwich Road Academy, Thetford

=== Secondary ===
- Mark Hall Academy, Harlow
