= Monkman =

Monkman is a surname. Notable people with the surname include:

- Alexander Monkman (1870–1941), Canadian Métis trading pioneer
- Betty C. Monkman (1942–2025), American curator and author
- Eric Monkman (born c.1987) Canadian academic and television personality
- Francis Monkman (1949–2023), English composer
- Kent Monkman (born 1965), Canadian artist
- Noel Monkman (1896–1969), Australian film director
- Percy Monkman (1892–1986), English entertainer, actor and painter
- Phyllis Monkman (1892–1976), English actress

== See also ==
- Monkman Provincial Park, a provincial park in British Columbia, Canada
- Monkman Pass, a mountain pass in the Canadian Rockies
