= Monkman & Seagull's Genius Adventures =

Television series

- Genre: Road trip
- Directed by: Joseph Cunningham
- Presented by: Bobby Seagull, Eric Monkman
- Country of origin: United Kingdom
- No. of seasons: 1
- No. of episodes: 3

Production
- Executive producers: Simon Dickson, Lorraine Charker-Phillips
- Producer: Joseph Cunningham
- Production company: Label1 Television Ltd

Original release
- Network: BBC 2
- Release: 18 May – 1 June 2020

Related
- Monkman & Seagull's Genius Guide to Britain

Monkman & Seagull's Genius Adventures is a BBC documentary series presented by Eric Monkman and Bobby Seagull, a duo who met as rivals on the quiz programme University Challenge and became friends, coauthors and TV and radio show cohosts. The show is a follow on from their 2018 series Monkman & Seagull's Genius Guide to Britain, it is a road trip around the United Kingdom, time-travelling through a key 150 years from the Industrial Revolution to the Victorian era. The show aired in 2020 with a voiceover supplied by Simon Callow.

== Episodes ==
No.	Title	Directed by	Original release date	UK viewers (millions)
1	"Episode 1"	Samuel Palmer	18 May 2020	N/A
The first episode covers the early Industrial Revolution and the Age of Enlightenment.: 1759 - John Harrison's marine chronometer.; 1768 - The first edition of the Encyclopædia Britannica; 1769 - Richard Arkwright's water frame for spinning cotton.; 1769 - James Watt inventing a steam engine with a separate condenser.; 1774 - Schiehallion experiment experiment to weigh the planet; 1774 - Joseph Priestley’s breakthrough experiments on gases.; 1784 - The 18th century’s hot air ballooning pioneers.; 1801 - Puffing Devil the world’s first steam railway locomotive. Designed by Richard Trevithick.
2	"Episode 2"	Samuel Palmer	25 May 2020	N/A
The first half of the 19th century, Britain’s industrial infrastructure.: 1815 - The Davy lamp; 1821 - Michael Faraday's research on electricity.; 1824 - The invention of Portland cement.; 1829 - Stephenson's Rocket locomotive winning the Rainhill Trials.; The History of the bicycle; 1846 - Charles Babbage’s Difference Engine No 2; 1843 - SS Great Britain
3	"Episode 3"	Samuel Palmer	1 June 2020	N/A
The height of the Victorian Era.: 1854 - Crystal Palace Dinosaurs. The first public park dedicated to science.; 1855 - The Victorian fern-hunting craze.; 1858 - Crossness Pumping Station, part of the London sewerage system.; 1859 - Charles Darwin wrote On The Origin Of Species.; 1870 - Undersea telegraph line, which connected Britain to India.; 1881 - The Savoy Theatre the first public building in the world to be lit entirely by electricity.; 1897 - The discovery of the electron.

== Reception ==
Sean O'Grady in The Independent praised the fun nature of the first episode, enjoyed the technical explanations and found Monkman & Seagull's joy at discovery and enthusiasm for enlightenment "extremely infectious".

Joel Golby in The Guardian suggested that a flaw in the show is that the segments where Monkman & Seagull are learning about something don't come across well, because the viewer knows that they are intelligent and already know the information. He suggested that the show needs "someone happy to play the fool", to ask questions and let Monkman & Seagull do the explaining instead. Golby praised the duos' chemistry, specifically singling out the segments filmed in the car saying "These are so comfortable, and so different from the rest of the show, that you suspect the production team neglected to tell the pair that the cameras were rolling, and instead captured raw magic and asked for permission to broadcast it afterwards."
