= Harris Science Academy East London =

Location
- The Clock Mill, Three Mill Lane; Three Mills, London, E3 3DU; England; 51.5271°N 0.0072°W

Information
- Type: Free school
- Motto: To stand on the shoulders of giants
- Established: 2 September 2013
- Founder: David Perks
- Local authority: Newham London Borough Council
- Specialists: Science and language
- Department for Education URN: 149431 Tables
- Ofsted: Reports
- Chairman: Anish Patel
- Principal: Dan MacPherson
- Executive principal: Lisa Kattenhorn
- Gender: Coeducational
- Age: 11 to 18
- Enrolment: 638 as of February 2022
- Capacity: 1000
- Colours: Red and navy blue
- Website: www.harrisscienceeastlondon.org.uk

Harris Science Academy East London (HSAEL), formerly known as East London Science School (ELSS), is a coeducational secondary free school and sixth form with specialist school status in science and language in Stratford, Bromley and Bow, in the London boroughs of Newham and Tower Hamlets. It was founded on Three Mills Island in its first temporary and current main site, the Clock Mill, by its first principal, David Perks, in 2013. The school originally planned to move to its permanent site two years after its opening, however this has yet to occur. The new building is being built by Berkeley Homes as part of its Twelvetrees Park development project (formerly Stephenson Street) and is expected to be complete sometime in 2022.

In September 2022, the school joined the Harris Federation, a multi-academy trust with schools in London and Essex, and was given its current name.

== History ==
=== Early years and opening ===
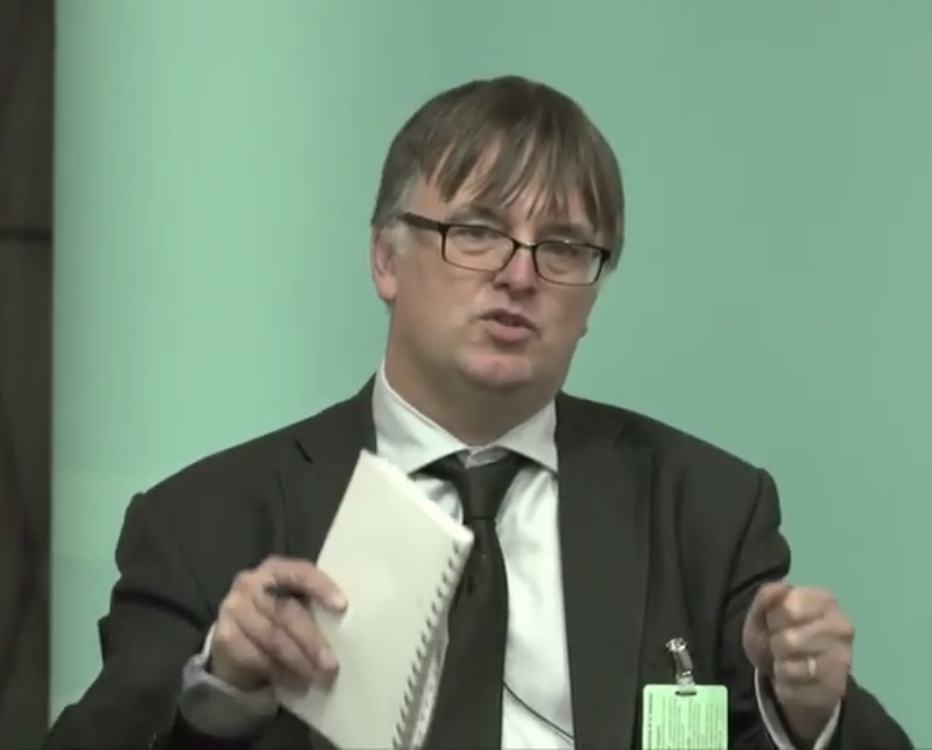
David Perks, the founder and first principal of Harris Science Academy East London (then known as East London Science School)

East London Science School was opened on 2 September 2013 by its founder and first principal David Perks with the intention of providing an education of rigour to students regardless of academic aptitude. Prior to its opening it faced local opposition. David Perks told Spiked that students were "recruited outside schools, on the street" as funds for the school, including for a building, were withdrawn until after its admissions closed. Plans for the school lacked a playground for students, leading to difficulties in gaining approval for its opening. It was housed in its temporary and current site, the Clock Mill, a Grade II listed building located on Three Mills Island. This site was chosen by the London Legacy Development Corporation. Sixth form education and a permanent site were expected to be provided two years within its opening, with the sixth form successfully opening by 2015. The first chairman was Dennis Hayes, who was elected in January 2014.

The school gained a "good" Ofsted grade in 2015. During this time, a location for a permanent site was still under negotiation between the school trust and the Greater London Authority, however it was expected to neighbour West Ham. The Minister of State for School Standards, Nick Gibb, visited the school in March 2015 and suggested that it take a leading role in encouraging other neighbouring secondaries to teach computing, mathematics and science as core subjects. Principal Perks met with Gibb previously in 2014, when they evaluated old science textbooks and co-created updated textbooks in light of the new changes to the national curriculum.

In July 2015, the London Legacy Development Corporation permitted the school to expand their temporary site into the building opposite of the Clock Mill, the Custom House. This was done to provide room for the increasing student population. The school's lease on the Clock Mill, which was originally scheduled to expire on 30 September 2015, was also granted an extra three years, as the school had failed to secure a permanent site before this date. It was decided that the school's permanent site be built on Stephenson Street in West Ham, as part of the Berkeley Homes Twelvetrees Park development project. The new school building is expected to be complete sometime in 2022.

In October 2017 Chairwoman Beth Davies was elected, serving until October 2018. Her successor, Chairman Adam Atashzai, was a special adviser during the David Cameron premiership and reported directly to the Prime Minister. The school's first GCSE examination results were released in 2018, with grades increasing in 2019. Ofsted made a brief inspection in January 2019 and reaffirmed their previous assessment of the school's "good" grade.

=== Inadequacy and transfer ===
In October 2019 the school trust was accused of mishandling funds. Investigations were made throughout 2020 by the Education and Skills Funding Agency, culminating in a report published in November 2020. The report concluded that multiple financial stipulations stated in the Academies Financial Handbook had been violated and funds were grossly misused on products such as a drone and camera, despite there being a severe deficit. Principal Perks' administrative power went unchallenged and governors were chosen based on their "connections" with him. Salaries and jobs were granted favourably for people affiliated with Perks, including a science department head who lacked the relevant qualifications for the job. Other violations included Perks keeping the school debit card outside the school premises and funds being sent to a Brexit organisation ran by The Baroness Fox of Buckley, who also had links to the Revolutionary Communist Party. A financial notice to improve was issued soon after, forcing the trust to follow a strict quota and recommending that the school join a "strong Multi-Academy Trust".

In 2021, during the COVID-19 pandemic, Perks became the first English headteacher who defied government guidance on mandatory face coverings in schools. Perks criticised the recommended mandatory face coverings as appeasing teaching unions and cited the herd immunity of East London Science School, produced as a result of previous cases in 2020, as a reason why they were not needed. Perks claimed that the school had not "a single positive test from a member of staff or child since December". Perks did however state that if mandatory coverings were legally enforced, as opposed to recommended, he would implement the mandate. Department for Education representative Sue Baldwin expressed concern over Perks' defiance and enquired the school over its face mask policy. According to Chairman Atashzai, It was decided that the school would now mandate face coverings as recommended in the government guidance, however Principal Perks refused to comment.

In June 2021 an Ofsted inspection graded the school as "inadequate" and placed it into special measures. Religious education was absent from the school's curriculum and its harsh testing regime was criticised for overworking teachers (exams were held each half term). Safeguarding and relationship and sex education also failed to meet set requirements. Principal Perks had taken a leave of absence and his duties were fulfilled by Vice Principal Mark Taylor as interim principal, however Perks left permanently in November 2021.

In February 2022 the Department for Education asked the Harris Federation to invite East London Science School into its multi-academy trust. This was decided by the Regional Schools Commissioner, who recommended the motion. Newham Council opposed the measure and instead wanted the school to be taken over by a local multi-academy trust. Nonetheless, the transfer received approval from the commissioner's advisory board on 24 February 2022. As a result, the school began the process of joining the federation and planned to have finished doing so by September 2022. The financial notice to improve on the school's trust was also lifted in May 2022.

The Department for Education confirmed the school's transfer to the Harris Federation on 24 June 2022. It joined the federation on 1 September 2022 and was renamed to Harris Science Academy East London (HSAEL). It retained specialist status in science and its principal Mark Taylor continued to serve under the executive headship of Lawrence Foley, who was also the executive headteacher of Harris Academy Tottenham. The federation built a new kitchen and design and technology room in one of the school's current temporary sites in response to parents' concerns around the slow progress of the new permanent site in the summer of 2022.

== Governance ==
As a free school (which in law operate as academies), Harris Science Academy East London is governed by an academy trust. Before it joined the Harris Federation, it was self governing under its own single-academy trust, the East London Science School Trust. The trust was incorporated a year prior to the school's opening and was headquartered at the Clock Mill. The school in this period was run by its board of trustees, which acted as its governing body. The board determined school ethos and money spending and was responsible for holding the principal and his senior leadership team (which administered the school) to account. The board was led by its chair and consisted of the principal, two parent governors, one staff governor and multiple external governors. Governors were held to account by members, who had the ability to overrule their actions and remove or appoint them. Members appointed each other and could determine the contents of the trust's articles of association. The first principal David Perks was also the accounting officer, however this role was not inherited by his successor, Mark Taylor.

Notable former governors of the school include Conservative Prime Minister of the United Kingdom Rishi Sunak and one of Conservative Prime Minister David Cameron's special advisers, Adam Atashzai. During Sunak's July–September 2022 bid to become leader of the Conservative Party and therefore Prime Minister, the Labour Party questioned his time as an ELSS governor, citing the school's links to the Revolutionary Communist Party.

== Curriculum ==
Harris Science Academy East London is a specialist school in language and science and was established to boost local opportunities for students to study science at university. It aims to provide an education of rigour to students regardless of social background or academic aptitude. As a result, the curriculum is academic and centres around technical education, mathematics and the core sciences of physics, chemistry and biology, which are taught separately. The language specialism consists of French and German. Grammar is emphasised in each subject and students are expected to work hard to succeed, with 12 tests being taken half-termly. Students are placed in a public ranking system to encourage competition and failing students are incentivised to "work harder".

Students are entered for GCSE and EPQ qualifications, which are attained through linear courses (courses that end with examinations that determine students' grades). Examinations for the courses are held during the summer term of year eleven and students then take linear courses for A-Level qualifications in the sixth form (years twelve and thirteen).

In year groups seven to eleven, all students learn the three core sciences, English language and literature, ethics, mathematics and sports. A number of subjects are universal in years seven and eight but optional from year nine. These subjects may be chosen by students in year eight for studies at GCSE level. They include the humanities of history and geography, the languages of German, French and Latin, computer science, music, photography and art. Students must choose to study one of the languages and humanities as part of the English Baccalaureate and one artistic or technical subject. Optional subjects introduced in year nine include GCSE sports, level 2 EPQ philosophy, the languages of Mandarin and Ancient Greek, electronics, astronomy and economics. Subject "integrity" is prioritised until year ten, when the focus turns to the contents of students' chosen GCSE courses. This is gradually introduced in the concluding stages of year nine and is phased out for revision in year eleven. Another optional subject, further mathematics, is also introduced during this curricular period.

At the sixth form level all students are required to study a science and mathematics A-Level course. Two more A-Level courses are then chosen in the previously studied subject areas of philosophy, economics, one of the humanities, Latin, English literature and art. The sixth form's purpose is to produce future scientists, medics and engineers in its students.

== Extracurricular activities ==
=== Enrichment ===
Harris Science Academy East London offers a free enrichment programme that aims to emulate those seen in independent schools (private schools). A minimum of 30 school trips are held for lower school students annually, in which subjects such as the arts or sciences are focused upon. Nominally, these lower school trips take place across London each week in the afternoon. Personalised trips focusing on students' GCSE courses are offered from year nine. Every May, the curriculum is suspended for two weeks to give way to the "enrichment fortnight", a period where trips outside London are offered. In 2021, the enrichment fortnight was replaced by an enrichment week due to the COVID-19 pandemic and was delayed to July. Before the pandemic, student exchange programmes were held between East London Science School and schools in Beijing, China. These programmes are planned to be reintroduced once public health restrictions are withdrawn.

Beginning in year nine, all students can compete for the Duke of Edinburgh Award. The award is split into three parts; physical, skills and volunteering. Students are assessed in these areas based on photographic evidence and essays, which are submitted to the "electronic Duke of Edinburgh's System". The award's expeditionary area gives students the ability to go on a two-day camping trip where the subjects of campcraft, teamwork, navigation and cookery are taught. The award is monitored by the school's Duke of Edinburgh coordinator, who as of 2018 is the only Duke of Edinburgh coordinator in East London.

In response to the COVID-19 pandemic, personalised tuition has been offered to sixth formers with a particular focus on students who failed their GCSEs in English and mathematics or have special needs.

=== Sports ===
Harris Science Academy East London has three male football teams based from the Clock Mill site, teams U12A, U14A and U17. U17 has participated in the London Youth Games and U12A and U14A have competed against other local schools. All year seven students take rowing lessons at the Royal Docks and can opt to row in the nearby lake for two hours. Swimming lessons are provided from rented locations in Mile End, as are other sports throughout London including netball, basketball and cricket. Rugby league lessons are held at the East London Rugby Club.

=== Physics Factory ===
The Physics Factory is a charity and teaching network that intends to improve results in the subject area of physics. It is jointly led by Harris Science Academy East London and Sydney Russell School and had a membership of 154 teachers and 4620 students in 2016 and 30 secondary schools in 2015. The network is based in East London and includes extracurricular activities such as workshops, school trips and, for teachers, continuing professional development (CPD). Former principal David Perks founded the Physics Factory and currently serves as its director.

London Mayor Boris Johnson allocated £443,000 to the Physics Factory in 2014. He also taught a Latin lesson supporting the No campaign in the 2014 Scottish independence referendum to some of East London Science School's students in that same year.

== School sites ==
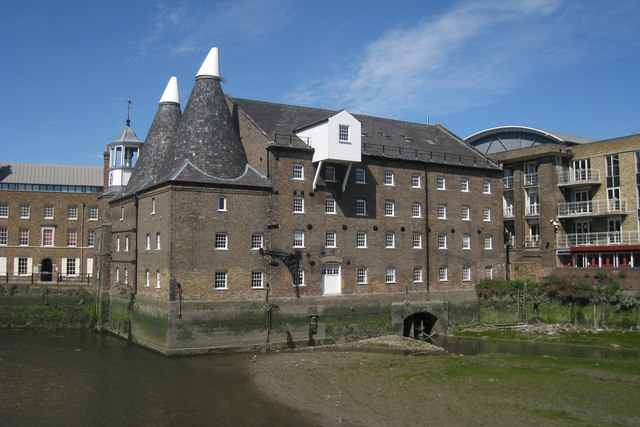
The Clock Mill on Three Mills Island, serving the lower school

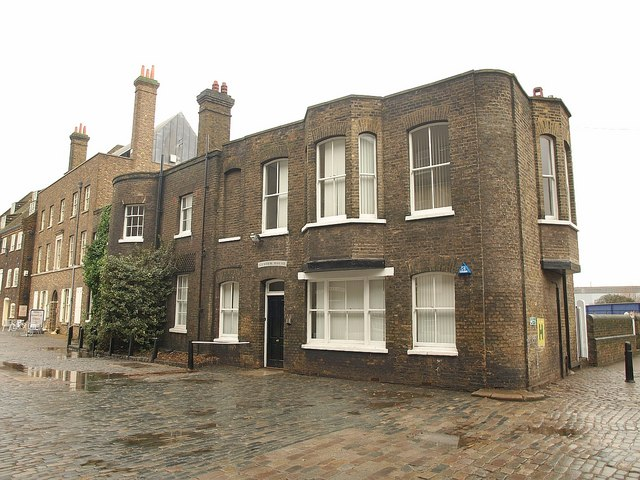
The Custom House on Three Mills Island, serving the lower school

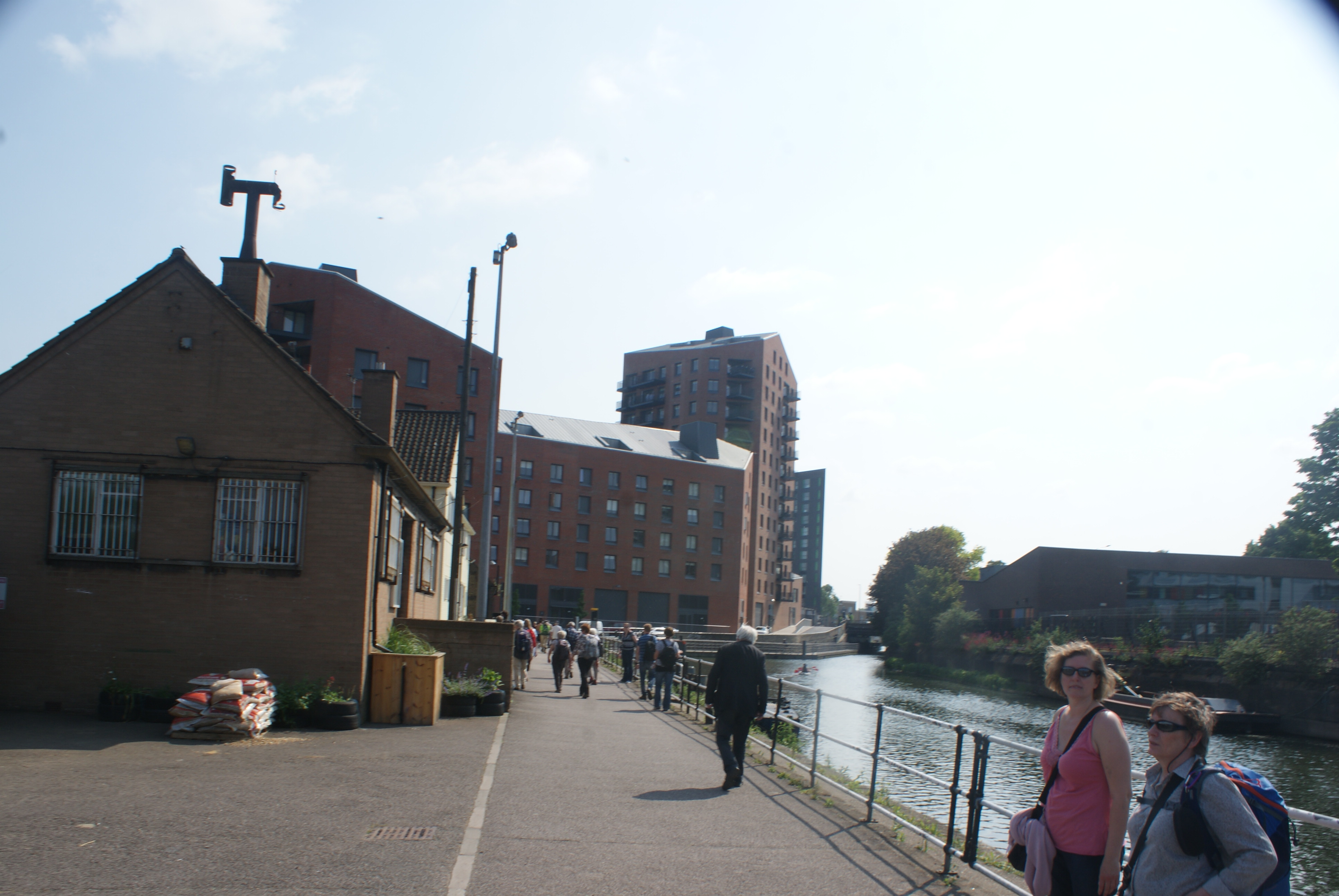
The upper school on Navigation Road, Bow

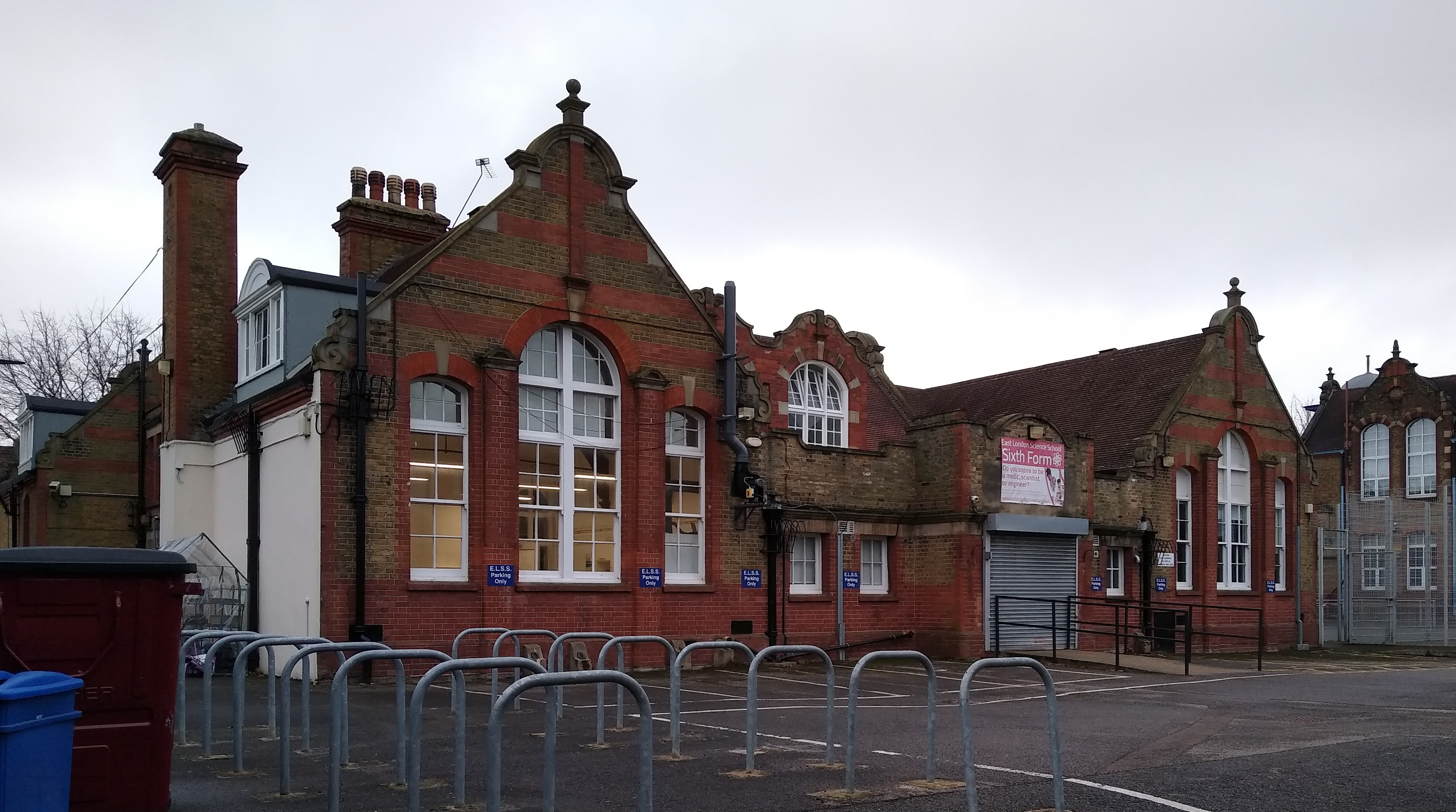
The former sixth form on Hilda Road, Canning Town

Currently, Harris Science Academy East London occupies two different sites in the boroughs of Newham and Tower Hamlets. The Clock Mill and Custom House on Three Mills Island are located in Stratford, Newham and act as the main site, serving the lower school. Lock Keepers, an apartment complex located on Gillender Street and Navigation Road in Bromley and Bow, Tower Hamlets, hosts the upper school site. The school also had a third, sixth form site which opened in 2018 and was located on Hilda Road in Canning Town, Newham. It closed in July 2022 with sixth form provision returning to The Clock Mill.

The school's permanent site will be located on Stephenson Street in West Ham in the Berkeley Homes Twelvetrees Park development project. It is expected to be complete sometime in 2022.

== Notable faculty ==
- Bobby Seagull, broadcaster and mathematician.
