= The Dukeries (disambiguation) =

The Dukeries is an area of Nottinghamshire containing four ducal seats.

The Dukeries may also refer to:

- The Dukeries Academy, secondary school, community college and leisure centre in Ollerton, Nottinghamshire
- The Dukeries, Kingston upon Hull, residential area of Hull, UK
