= Limpenhoe =

Village in Norfolk, England

Coordinates: 52.5799°N 1.5347°E

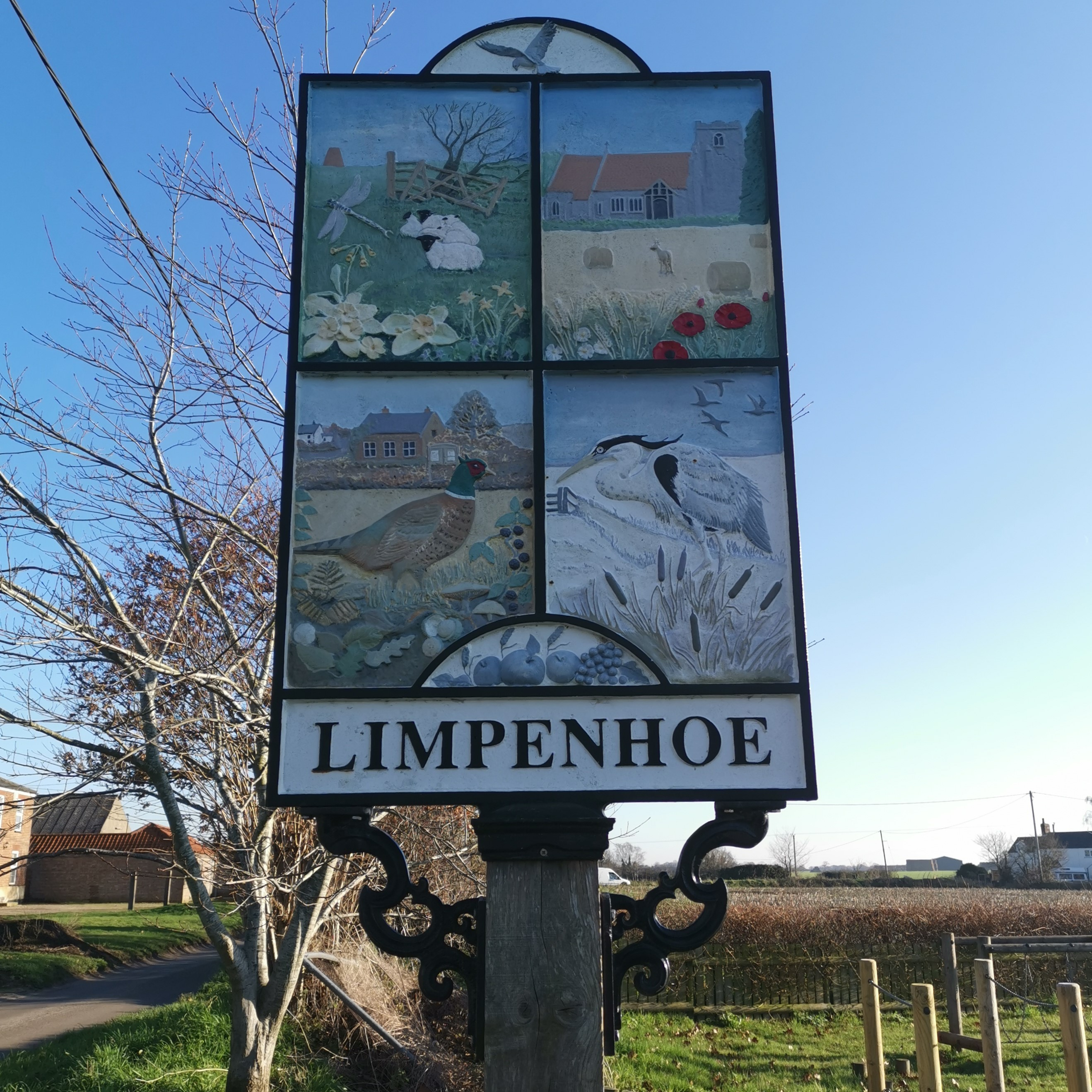
- Limpenhoe Village Sign

- Location within Norfolk
- OS grid reference: TG397038
- Civil parish: Cantley, Limpenhoe and Southwood
- District: Broadland
- Shire county: Norfolk
- Region: East
- Country: England
- Sovereign state: United Kingdom
- Post town: NORWICH
- Postcode district: NR13
- Dialling code: 01493
- UK Parliament: Broadland and Fakenham

Limpenhoe is a village and former civil parish, now in the Cantley, Limpenhoe and Southwood, in the Broadland district, in the English county of Norfolk.

Limpenhoe is located 8.2 miles (13.2 km) south-west of Great Yarmouth and 10.8 miles (17.4 km) south-east of Norwich.

== History ==
Limpenhoe's name is of Anglo-Saxon origin and derives from the Old English for Limpa's hill-spur.

In the Domesday Book, Limpenhoe is recorded as a settlement of 30 households located in the hundred of Blofield. In 1086, the village was divided between the East Anglian estates of King William I, William d'Ecouis and Rabel the engineer.

On 1 April 1935 the parish was abolished and merged into Cantley.

== Geography ==
In 1931 the parish had a population of 156, this was the last time separate population statistics were collected for Limpenhoe as in 1935 the parish was merged.

Limpenhoe Meadows is a Site of Special Scientific Interest within the village due to its biological diversity.

== St. Botolph's Church ==
Limpenhoe's former parish church is dedicated to Saint Botolph and dates from the medieval period, being rebuilt in 1881 by A.S. Hewitt. St. Botolph's is located on Church Road and has been Grade II listed since 1962. The church is no longer open for Sunday service.

St. Botolph's holds a Thirteenth Century font and stained-glass windows that were designed in nearby Great Yarmouth.

== Windmill ==
Limpenhoe Windpump is a drainage mill. It has been conserved with a view to restoration. It is the last surviving windmill built by William Thorold.

== Governance ==
Limpenhoe is part of the electoral ward of Brundall for local elections and is part of the district of Broadland.

The village's national constituency is Broadland and Fakenham which has been represented by the Conservative Party's Jerome Mayhew MP since 2019.
