= H. G. Graves =

Henry George Graves ARSM (1864 – 1929) was Controller of Patents and Designs in India between 1904 and 1919, a trustee of the Indian Museum, an early President of the Mining and Geological Institute of India, and a member of the Indian Legislative Assembly.

== Life ==
Henry George Graves was born at Methwold, England in 1864. He was educated at Bedford Modern School and the Royal School of Mines where he graduated in Mining and Metallurgy and was a De la Beche Medallist in Mining.

In 1886, Graves was appointed an Examiner at H.M. Patent Office, becoming an expert in patent and design law. In 1904 he was seconded to India to oversee the establishment of the Patent and Design Office of India, an idea initiated by Lord Curzon, then Viceroy of India, to cope with increasing demand for the local registration of patents and designs. It was Graves’s responsibility to organise the administration of new Patent Acts and he was appointed a Member of the Indian Legislative Council to draft, introduce and carry through a new Act. On 1 January 1912, the Indian Patents and Designs Acts (No.2, 1911) came into force.

Graves was a respected figure in Indian society and he became a trustee of the Indian Museum and was an early President of the Mining and Geological Institute of India.

Until 1919, Graves served as the Controller of Patents and Designs. He set sail from Bombay on board the Mandala in 1920 and docked in London on 15 June 1920. He died in Bedford in 1929.
