= Natasha Preston =

British writer

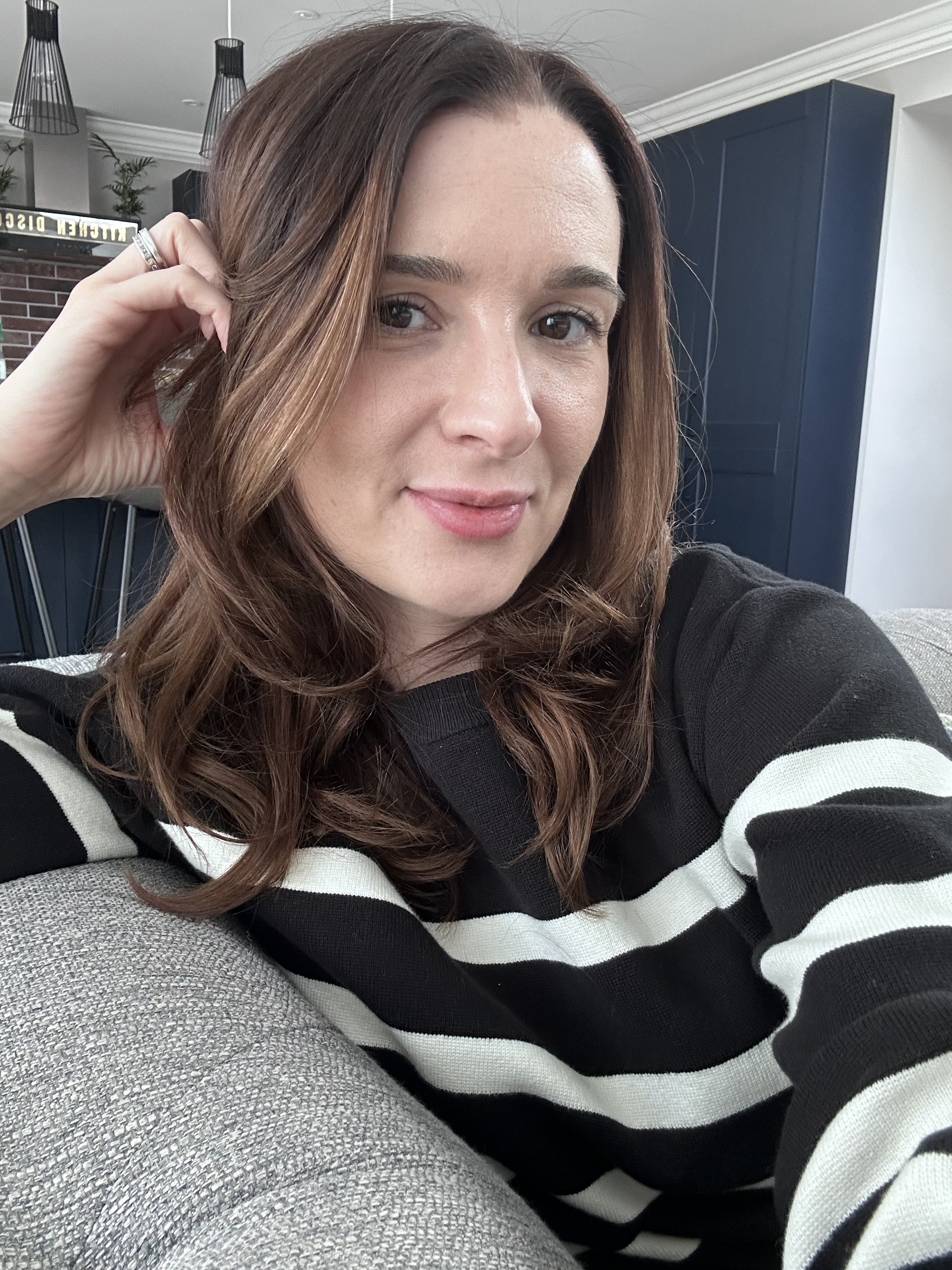
- Born: Natasha Vicki Preston; 5 January 1988 (age 38)
- Years active: 2010–present
- Spouse: Joseph Green (m. 2014)
- Children: 3
- Website: www.natashapreston.com

Natasha Vicki Preston (born 5 January 1988) is an English novelist. She is best known for her New York Times bestselling young adult thrillers, including The Cellar (2014), The Cabin (2016), The Fear (2022), and The Haunting (2023). She also writes contemporary romance.

== Early life ==
Preston is from Norfolk. She attended Methwold High School.

== Career ==
Preston became interested in writing unexpectedly when she joined the writing website Wattpad in 2010, initially as a reader. After working odd administrative jobs, she self-published her first novel Silence, a romance, in 2012. In 2013, Wattpad formed a partnership with Sourcebooks, through which Preston landed her first book deal with Sourcebooks Fire to edit and commercially publish her 2010 young adult (YA) psychological thriller The Cellar in 2014.

She was named to the "bright young things" list by the London Evening Standard in 2014. Her influences included Kirsty Moseley, Stephen King and Jay Crownover. Preston then signed two further books with Sourcebook, Awake in 2015 and The Cabin in 2016. The Cellar and The Cabin both became New York Times bestsellers in the young adult category, with the former reaching #1 in e-sellers. By 2016, sales for The Cellar had reached over 200 thousand. The Lost and You Will Be Mine followed in 2018 and 2019.

In addition, Preston continued self-publishing contemporary romance novels. Broken Silence, the sequel to Silence, became a Smashwords bestseller. Further romances included Lie to Me (2018).

Preston then moved to Delacorte Press for The Twin in 2020, The Lake in 2021, and The Fear in 2022. The Lake was a Publishers Weekly children's paperback bestseller of 2021 with over 100 thousand units sold, whileThe Fear became a New York Times bestseller in the young adult category and Publishers Weekly bestseller of 2022. The Island and The Haunting followed in 2023.

Following the publication of The Dare, in September 2024, Preston signed a book deal with Hot Key Books (a Bonnier Books imprint). The deal included six previous titles The Haunting, The Twin, The Dare, The Lake, The Fear and The Island and three new titles, including The Party that year.

== Personal life ==
Preston married Joseph Green in 2014. They live in rural Norfolk, England and together have two sons and one daughter (born 2011, 2016 and 2025).

== Bibliography ==
=== Thrillers ===
- Covert (2013)
- The Cellar (2014)
  - You'll Always Be Mine (2018) (also known as His)
- Awake (2015)
- The Cabin (2016)
- You Will Be Mine (2018)
- The Lost (2019)
- The Twin (2020)
- The Lake (2021)
- The Fear (2022)
- The Island (2023)
- The Haunting (2023)
- The Dare (2024)
- The Party (2024)
- The Obsession (2025)

=== Romance ===
==== Silence ====
- Silence (2012)
- Broken Silence (2013)
- Players, Bumps and Cocktail Sausages (2014)
  - Silent Night (2014, 3.5)

==== Chance ====
- Second Chance (2014)
- Our Chance (2015)

==== The One ====
- Waking Up in Vegas (2020)
- Just Like the Movies (2020)
- Read My Mind (2020)

==== Standalones ====
- Save Me (2014)
- With the Band (2016)
- Reliving Fate (2018)
- Lie to Me (2018)
- After the End (2018)
- Villain (2023) (as Tasha Preston)

=== Shorts and collaborations ===
- "The New Boy Next Door" in Together, Apart (2022)
- Cutthroat (2022), part of Scouts
