= William Thorold (engineer) =

British millwright (1798–1878)

- Born: 9 October 1798; Methwold, Norfolk
- Died: 17 December 1878 (aged 80); Norwich, Norfolk
- Spouse: Susannah
- Children: Thomas Telford Thorold, (second son d.1829), Ellen Thorold (second daughter, d.1866)
- Engineering career
- Discipline: Architect, civil engineer, millwright
- Institutions: Institution of Civil Engineers (member)
- Projects: The New Cut on the River Yare, The Acle Straight, several windmills built, designed a number of workhouses.

William Thorold (9 October 1798 – 17 December 1878) was a 19th-century millwright, architect and civil engineer in Norwich, Norfolk, England.

He was born in 1798 in Methwold, Norfolk, the son of a farmer. Apprenticed to George Shafto and later to John Fisher Gurling in St Martin's Lane, Norwich, he was in business as a millwright from 1828 until his death at his home in Thorpe Hamlet, Norwich, in 1878.

== Millwright ==
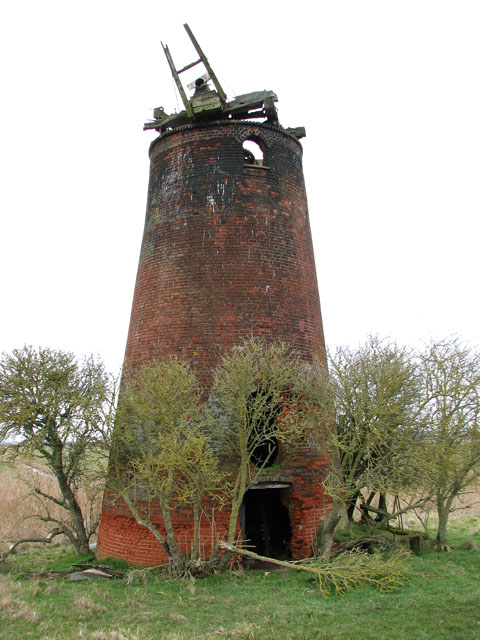
Limpenhoe mill, March 2010

William Thorold built a post mill at Felthorpe in 1830, and a tower drainage windmill at Limpenhoe in 1831. He was involved with refitting watermills at Bawburgh in 1829, Taverham in 1842 and Oxnead in 1849. He was also involved with the steam-powered St James' Yarn Mill, Norwich in 1836 but it is not known whether he was the architect, millwright or both.

== Architect ==
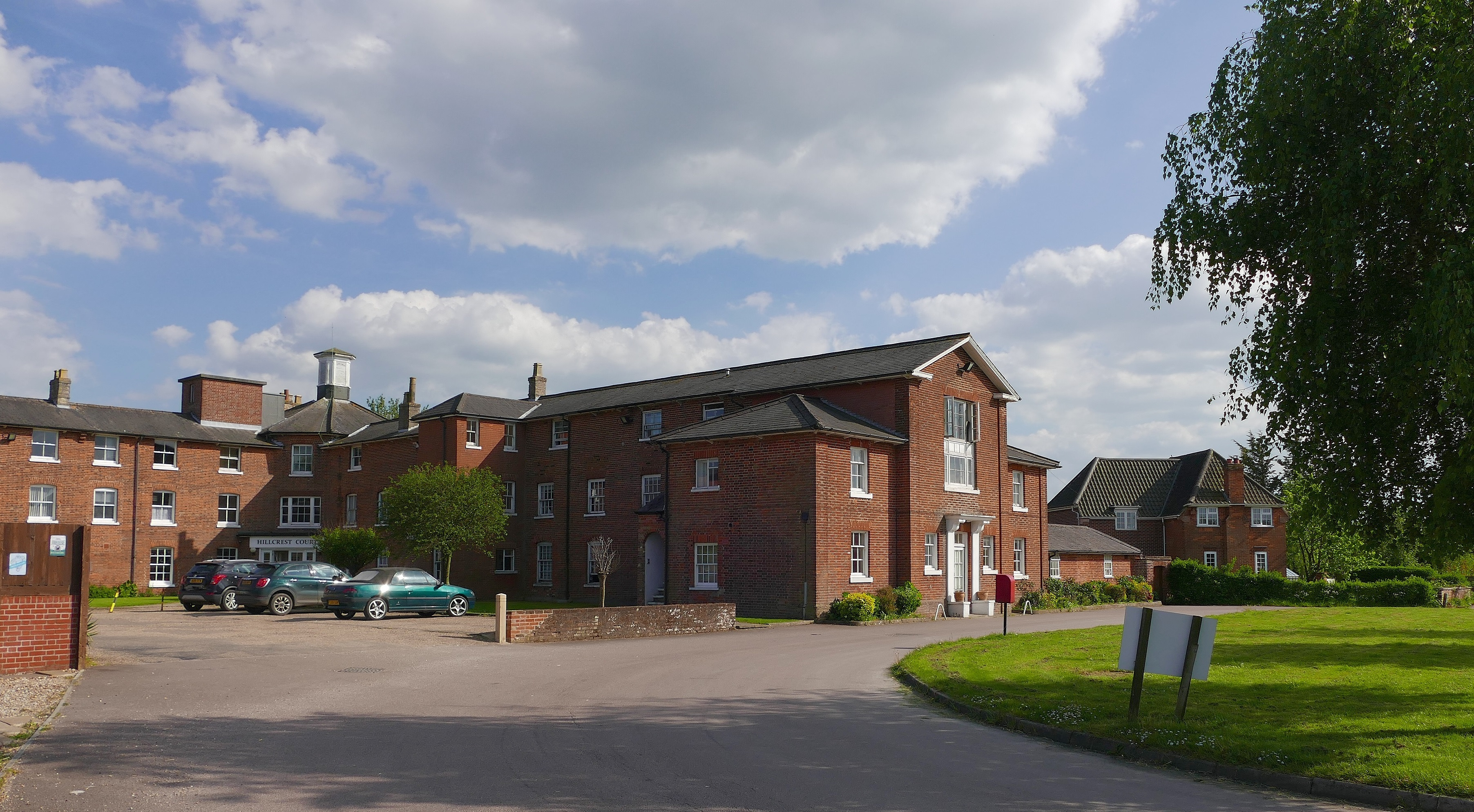
Former Depwade Union Workhouse at Pulham Market

William Thorold designed workhouses built at Thetford, Pulham Market, Rockland All Saints, Kenninghall, Hindringham and Great Snoring all in Norfolk between 1836 and 1837. He also designed a workhouse built at Rochford, Essex in 1837. As mentioned above, he may have also designed the St James' Yarn Mill, Norwich in 1836.

== Civil engineer ==
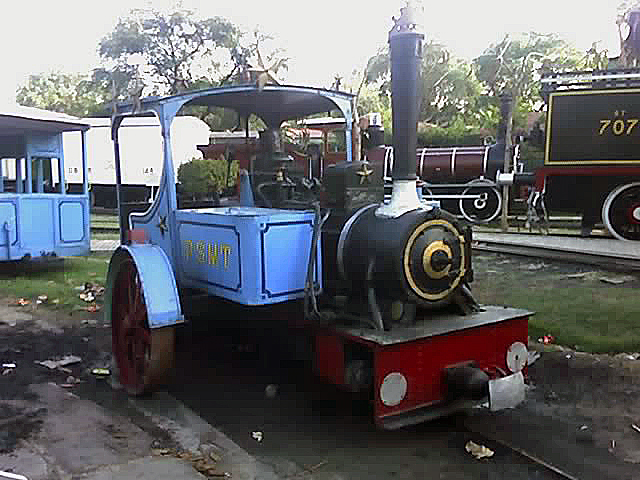
Patiala State Monorail Trainways locomotive

Thorold was the contractor who built the Acle Straight between Acle and Great Yarmouth in 1830–31. He also cut the New Cut of the River Yare at Thorpe St Andrew in 1843 which enabled the Yarmouth and Norwich Railway to avoid the expense and inconvenience of building and operating two swing bridges. William Thorold was elected as a Member of the Institution of Civil Engineers sometime before 1845, being member number 321. He was also involved in drainage schemes at Ten Mile Bank, Hilgay and Middle Level, Kings Lynn in the early 1860s.

In 1868, he presented a paper titled "Railways on Turnpike Roads" to the British Association, proposing a monorail system that could be laid at ground level, and able to negotiate curves of 20 feet radius and gradients of 1 in 12. The proposed motive power was either animal or steam. One of the countries he thought would be suitable was India and there were two systems built in that country, in Kharagpur and Patiala. The Kharagpur system used mules as motive power. The Patiala system used steam locomotives with an almost unique 0-3-0 wheel arrangement, having double-flanged driving wheels and the locomotives having a single outrigger wheel which ran on the road. Four such locomotives were built by Orenstein & Koppel of Berlin. One locomotive is preserved in working order at the Indian National Railway Museum in New Delhi, where a section of the monorail has been reconstructed.
