= Monkman & Seagull's Genius Guide to Britain =

Television series

- Genre: Road trip
- Directed by: Samuel Palmer
- Presented by: Bobby Seagull, Eric Monkman
- Country of origin: United Kingdom
- No. of seasons: 1
- No. of episodes: 4

Production
- Executive producers: Simon Dickson, Lorraine Charker-Phillips
- Producer: Merle Currie
- Production company: Label1 Television Ltd

Original release
- Network: BBC 2
- Release: 17 September – 8 October 2018

Related
- Monkman & Seagull’s Genius Adventures

Monkman & Seagull's Genius Guide to Britain is a BBC documentary series presented by Eric Monkman and Bobby Seagull, a duo who met as rivals on the quiz programme University Challenge and became friends, coauthors and radio-show co-hosts. The show is a road trip around the United Kingdom and focuses on British scientific and technological ingenuity and has a voiceover supplied by Simon Callow.

The show aired in September and October 2018 and was recommissioned for a second series which became a new series Monkman & Seagull’s Genius Adventures, which was broadcast in three 60 minute episodes in May 2020.

== Episodes ==
No.	Title	Directed by	Original release date	UK viewers (millions)
1	"England"	Samuel Palmer	17 September 2018	1.81
Blackpool Pleasure Beach, Sir Hiram Maxim's 1904 Captive Flying Machines, the oldest amusement ride in Europe.; British Lawnmower Museum, Southport.; Emley Moor transmitting station, Huddersfield; The smallest museum in the world, in Warley Town, West Yorkshire.; Jodrell Bank Observatory, Macclesfield
2	"Wales"	Samuel Palmer	24 September 2018	1.58
Pontcysyllte Aqueduct the highest navigable aqueduct in the world.; Gladstone's Library, Hawarden.; Mount Snowdon quarry hospital in Llanberis.; Snowdon Mountain Railway.
3	"Northern Ireland"	Samuel Palmer	1 October 2018	N/A (<1.59) (Note: Not reported in the weekly top 15 programmes for four-screen viewer ratings.)
The development of the ejector seat by Martin-Baker; The Grub ten-inch refracting telescope at the Armagh Observatory; Headhunters Barber Shop & Railway Museum, Enniskillen; Belfast Harbour, 'Titanic's little sister' - the SS Nomadic; DMC DeLorean motor car
4	"Scotland"	Samuel Palmer	8 October 2018	N/A (<1.69)
James Clerk Maxwell and his theory of electromagnetism.; Deep-fried Mars bar; Hunterian Museum and Art Gallery and Lord Kelvin; Loch Lomond and the science of stone skimming.; Inveraray Jail, an authentically preserved 19th-century jail.; Cruachan hydroelectric power station on and in Ben Cruachan.

== Reception ==
Sarah Hughes in i called the series "entertaining, eccentric, and well-informed" and praised the pair's unforced eccentricity and natural rapport.

Rebecca Nicholson in The Guardian also praised the warmth and appeal of their friendship but said that the show felt a bit "skittish" by not staying at locations for long enough.

In The Evening Standard, Katie Law said there was insufficient chemistry between them and that none of their observations is especially nuanced or perceptive.
