= Bobby Seagull =

English maths teacher and television presenter (born 1984)

Bobby Seagull MBE
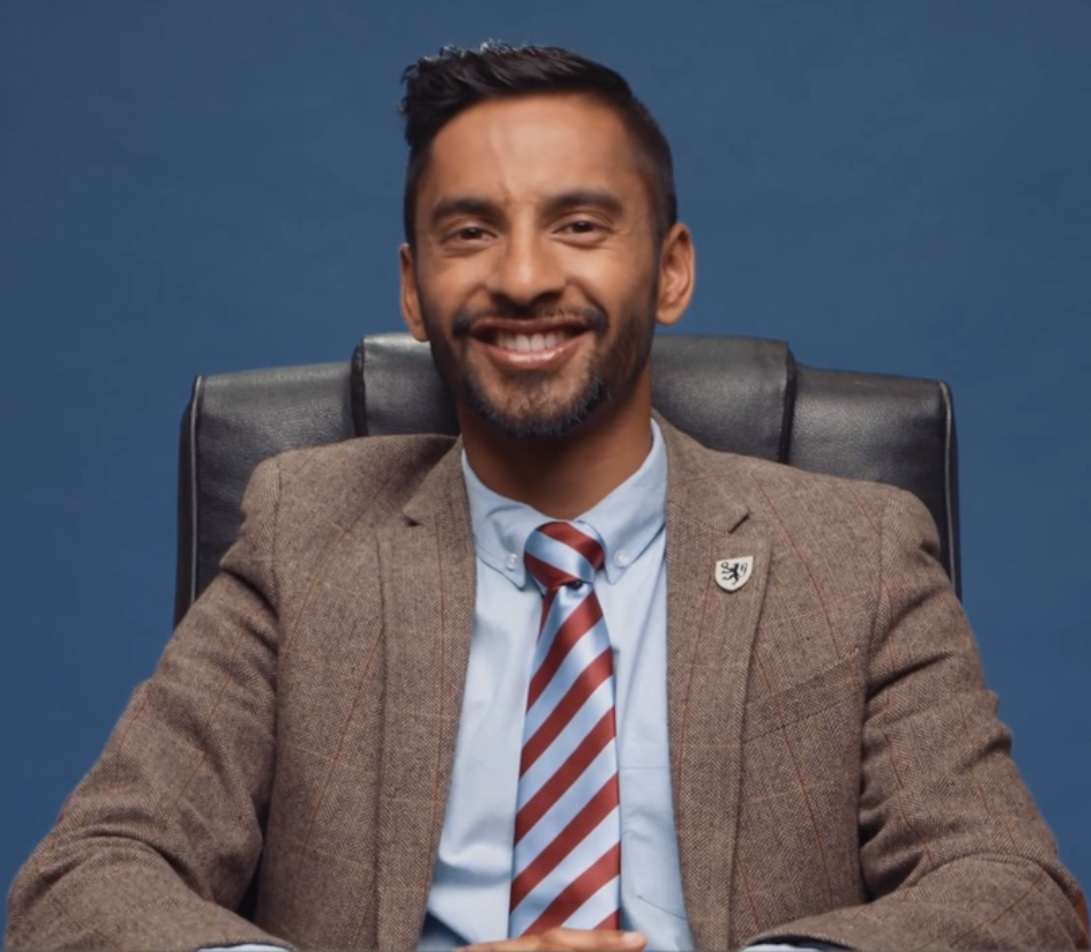
- Seagull in an advertisement for Argos
- Born: 13 February 1984 (age 42)
- Education: Eton College; University of Oxford (failed to complete); Royal Holloway, University of London (BA); Hughes Hall, Cambridge (PGCE); Emmanuel College, Cambridge (MA)
- Scientific career
- Workplaces: East London Science School

Jay Bobby Seagull MBE (born 13 February 1984) is a British mathematics teacher, broadcaster and writer. He appeared on the television programme University Challenge in 2017, and in 2018 on Monkman & Seagull's Genius Guide to Britain. His second book, The Life-Changing Magic of Numbers, was published in 2018.

== Early life and education ==
Seagull, the second of his parents' four sons all of whom were called Jay, grew up in the London Borough of Newham. His Malayali parents emigrated to East Ham from Kerala in India. He said on episode ten of The Answer Trap that "my first name is Jay because in my family there's a South Indian tradition, so Jay Dave, Jay Bobby, Jay John, Jay Thomas, and then my family name is Jose, from Kerala in South India". Asked by an interviewer in 2017 about his "pretty unusual" name, Bobby Seagull explained, "My dad was very taken by the book Jonathan Livingston Seagull". He attended St Michael's Primary School followed by St Bonaventure's in Upton Park. He is a fan of local football club West Ham United.

When he was growing up, his father would take his boys regularly to East Ham Library, where Seagull was encouraged to find books that interested him. His headteacher was Michael Wilshaw. After seeing an advertisement for sixth form scholarships at Eton College, he subsequently applied and studied at Eton. Seagull started studying mathematics at Lady Margaret Hall, University of Oxford, but left his degree and graduated from Royal Holloway, University of London.

== Career ==
After graduating from Royal Holloway, University of London, Seagull joined Lehman Brothers as a trader. He was there during the 2008 financial crisis, and has spoken about the days before it filed for bankruptcy. He left banking and worked as an accountant for Pricewaterhouse Coopers. During this time, Seagull was involved with voluntary work and training new graduates.

Seagull did a PGCE at Hughes Hall, Cambridge and completed a master's degree in education at Emmanuel College whilst finishing his newly qualified teacher (NQT) year. He has taught at Chesterton Community College, Cambridge and East London Science School. Seagull is a part-time Maths teacher at a secondary school in London. He has created mathematics raps for his school classes. He is also leading a course on money management at the Open University. Since the start of 2018, Seagull has been pursuing a doctorate at the University of Cambridge concerning "mathematical anxiety and phobia".

He has been a columnist for the Financial Times since January 2018. Seagull has since become a national campaigner to improve maths literacy. He is concerned that in the United Kingdom it is acceptable to celebrate being bad at maths as if it is a badge of honour. He is also an advocate for maths teachers, supporting them in the creation of new materials and campaigning for better pay. He has said he wants to be the "Jamie Oliver of maths..Jamie Oliver helped to introduce healthy food in schools. I would love to be the equivalent for mathematics where I can help change how people nationally think about it". He has created maths puzzles for BBC Bitesize, as well as working with Rachel Riley.

Seagull releases regular maths challenges on BBC Radio 4. In 2018 he taught mathematics to three BBC News presenters, Naga Munchetty, Jayne McCubbin and Tim Muffett, before they retook their General Certificate of Secondary Education (GCSE) mathematics paper. He presents the podcast Maths Appeal with Susan Okereke.

=== University Challenge ===
Whilst working at East London Science School, Seagull was made captain of the Emmanuel College University Challenge team. During the competition he was praised for his enthusiasm, and his name started to trend on Twitter. He met Eric Monkman in the semi-final, where Monkman's team (Wolfson College) won. Whilst the pair started as rivals, they went on to form a friendship and began broadcasting together.

=== Broadcasting ===
Seagull and Monkman were given their own radio show, Monkman and Seagull's Polymathematic Adventure, in 2017. Seagull and Monkman co-hosted their first television series, Monkman & Seagull's Genius Guide to Britain, in 2018. In the show, the pair travelled the United Kingdom to identify Britain's technological achievements. In 2020 they followed up with Monkman & Seagull's Genius Adventures.

In 2019 Seagull became an advocate for investment in public libraries, working with the Chartered Institute of Library and Information Professionals (CILIP) to front the 'Libraries Deliver' campaign as a national 'Library Champion'. In 2020, Seagull was awarded Honorary Fellowship of CILIP.

Seagull has appeared on the YouTube channel Football Daily on a number of occasions, specifically in their Stat Wars series. He has also participated as a panellist on the BBC Radio 4 discussion programme Any Questions?.

In 2021, he and quiz expert Frank Paul became the resident "trappers" on the Channel 4 game show The Answer Trap. Their role is to create plausible-sounding but wrong answers to questions asked of the contestants, which are hidden among the genuine responses.

In December 2022 Seagull competed alongside Eric Monkman in BBC's Celebrity Antiques Road Trip.

In 2023, Seagull was on Pilgrimage: The Road Through Portugal, a BBC Two series following a group of celebrities going on a pilgrimage to Fátima. He was the only Roman Catholic pilgrim in the group.

In April 2023, Seagull appeared on Indian Matchmaking, a Netflix series where people of Indian heritage enlist the help of a matchmaker to find a partner to marry. He took part in series five of Celebrity Hunted in 2023, alongside Saffron Barker.

He was awarded an MBE in the 2026 New Year's Honours list.

== Books ==
- Seagull, Bobby (2019). The Life-Changing Magic of Numbers. Penguin. ISBN 978-0-7535-5280-3.
- Seagull, Bobby (2017). The Monkman And Seagull Quiz Book. Eyewear Publishing. ISBN 978-1-911335-99-3.
