= Iceni Academy =

Iceni Secondary Academy

Location
- Stoke Road; Methwold, Norfolk, IP26 4PE; England; 52.5272°N 0.5564°E

Information
- Type: Academy
- Motto: Aim High, Work Hard, Be Kind
- Established: 1957
- Trust: Academy Transformation Trust
- Department for Education URN: 139058 Tables
- Ofsted: Reports
- Principal (Secondary): Richard Rushton
- Gender: Mixed
- Age: 11 to 16
- Enrollment: 683
- Capacity: 885
- Website: icenimethwold.attrust.org.uk

The Iceni Secondary Academy (formerly Hockwold and Methwold Community School and Iceni Academy) is a mixed, secondary school located in Methwold, Norfolk, England.

== History ==
The school was first formed as Hockwold and Methwold Community School in September 2011 from the merger of Hockwold Primary School and Methwold High School. Methwold High School was built in 1957 and officially opened on 28 April 1958 by Col. Sir Bartle Edwards. Records suggest that in 1939 children who did not pass the exam to go to Downham Market Grammar School stayed at the Primary School (as it was then) until they were 14 years old.

Hockwold and Methwold Community School was awarded academy status and renamed Iceni Academy in January 2013.

Today the school, which celebrated its 60th birthday in 2018, continues to operate over the original Hockwold and Methwold sites accommodating the primary and secondary departments respectively.

The Academy received its first-ever "Good" rating in July 2016. In 2018 the Academy was recognised for its work to bring the world into the classroom with an award from the British Council.

Iceni Secondary Academy became a standalone school in September 2024.

== Location ==
In all, the school serves the largest rural catchment in Norfolk, and each department is smaller than average for that category of school.

== Principals ==
- Prior to 2006- Ken Earl
- September 2006 – August 2013 - Denise Walker
- September 2013 – December 2017 - Gee Cook

Hockwold (Primary site)

- January 2018 – present - Emma Owner

Methwold (Secondary site)

- January 2018 – August 2020 - Stephen Plume
- September 2020 – April 2023 - Lesley Hogg
- July 2023 – present - Richard Rushton

== Notable alumni ==
- Natasha Preston, novelist
- Chloe Smith, Member of Parliament for Norwich North
