= Limpenhoe Windpump =

Windmill in Norfolk, England

- Limpenhoe Windpump, January 2012
- Interactive map of Limpenhoe Windpump

Origin
- Mill name: Limpenhoe Windpump
- Mill location: Limpenhoe, Norfolk, United Kingdom
- Grid reference: TG 3946 0190
- Coordinates: 52°33′44″N 1°31′53″E
- Year built: 1831

Information
- Purpose: Drainage mill
- Type: Tower mill
- Storeys: Four storeys
- No. of sails: Four
- Type of sails: Patent sails
- Windshaft: Cast iron
- Winding: Fantail
- Fantail blades: Eight
- Type of pump: Scoopwheel
- Scoopwheel diameter: 19 feet 0 inches (5.79 m)

Limpenhoe Windpump is a Grade II listed tower mill at Limpenhoe, Norfolk, United Kingdom. A drainage mill built in 1831, it is the last surviving windmill built by William Thorold, the Norwich millwright. The mill has been conserved with a view to full restoration.

== History ==
Limpenhoe Windpump was built in 1831 by William Thorold, the Norwich millwright and architect for £744. It was built for a number of landowners, who paid towards the cost in proportion to the amount of their land that would be drained by the mill. In 1895, the scoopwheel was replace by William England, the Ludham millwright. The mill was working c.1919. It ceased working when the windshaft broke at the canister at an unknown date. Arthur C. Smith surveyed the mill on 21 May 1977. The mill was then derelict, with the cap frame, windshaft, brake wheel and machinery. The mill was listed Grade II on 26 February 1987. Smith surveyed the mill again on 13 June 1989. He noted that the brake wheel had collapsed. A lease to the Norfolk Windmills Trust was stated to be pending.

An obstacle to the mill's restoration was that ownership of the land the mill stood on was unclear. British Sugar owned all the land surrounding the mill, apart from the plot the mill stood on. The widow of the last known landowner denied ownership. A farmer that could have claimed the mill as he had freely accessed the land for a umber of years declined to do so. By 2003, the cap frame had been lifted off the mill and a temporary roof put on the tower. In 2011, Oliver Read claimed possession of the mill with the intention of restoration. The mill is the only surviving windmill built by William Thorold.

== Description ==
Limpenhoe Windpump is a four storey tower mill. The tower is 35 feet (11 m) tall. It is 16 feet 0 inches (4.88 m) internal diameter at the base, with walls 22 inches (560 mm) thick. It had a boat shape cap. Four double Patent sails were carried in a cast iron windshaft. The mill was winded by an eight-bladed fantail. The windshaft carried a 19 feet 0 inches (5.79 m) diameter brake wheel. This drove a 5 feet 0 inches (1.52 m) diameter wallower, located at the top of the 11 1/2 inches (290 mm) square wooden upright shaft. At the bottom of the upright shaft, a cast iron crown wheel drove a 10 feet 0 inches (3.05 m) diameter pit wheel, on a 8 1/2 inches (220 mm) square cast iron shaft. This drove a 19 feet 0 inches (5.79 m) diameter scoopwheel.
