= Barry Troyna =

British sociologist and activist

- Born: Barry Stephen Troyna; 6 September 1951; Hackney, London, England
- Died: 9 February 1996 (aged 44); Coventry, England
- Known for: Research on racism in education Anti-racism activism

Academic background
- Education: University of Leicester
- Thesis: The significance of reggae music in the lives of black adolescent boys in Britain: an exploratory study (1978)

Academic work
- Discipline: Sociology of education
- Institutions: University of Warwick

Barry Stephen Troyna (6 September 1951 – 9 February 1996) was a British sociologist of education and anti-racist activist who taught at the University of Warwick. He is known for his writings on racism and racial inequality in education.

== Biography ==
Troyna was born in Hackney, North London, England. He attended Tottenham Grammar School, followed by Nottingham College, from which he received his Bachelor of Education degree. He then taught briefly at Dukeries Comprehensive School before enrolling at the University of Leicester, where he earned his M.Phil. in 1978. From 1981 to 1985, he worked with John Rex at the University of Warwick's Centre for Research in Ethnic Relations as a research officer. He was a reader at Sunderland Polytechnic from 1986 to 1988. In October 1995, three months before he died, the University of Warwick awarded him a personal professorship. He died in Coventry, England on 9 February 1996, after fighting cancer for almost two years. At the time of his death, he was editor-in-chief of the British Educational Research Journal.
