= University Challenge 2016–17 =

Season of a television programme

Series 46 of University Challenge began on 11 July 2016 on BBC Two, and finished on 10 April 2017. This series of the long running quiz show drew larger audiences than usual thanks to a collection of interesting characters, most notably Eric Monkman from Wolfson College, Cambridge, who has been described on Twitter by many viewers as "the most intense contestant ever".

The University of East London made its University Challenge debut in this series.

== Results ==
- Winning teams are highlighted in **bold**.
- Teams with green scores (winners) returned in the next round, while those with red scores (losers) were eliminated.
- Teams with orange scores had to win one more match to return in the next round.
- Teams with yellow scores indicate that two further matches had to be played and won (teams that lost their first quarter-final match).
- A score in italics indicates a match decided on a tie-breaker question.

=== First round ===
Team 1	Score		Team 2	Total	Broadcast date
University of Sheffield	130	210	**University of Bristol**	340	11 July 2016
**Corpus Christi College, Oxford**	200	175	Jesus College, Cambridge	375	18 July 2016
University of Liverpool	95	235	**University of Warwick**	330	25 July 2016
Queens' College, Cambridge	150	160	**Peterhouse, Cambridge**	310	1 August 2016
**Oriel College, Oxford**	150	95	University of Manchester	245	8 August 2016
**Emmanuel College, Cambridge**	175	135	University of Nottingham	310	15 August 2016
**Balliol College, Oxford**	220	55	Imperial College London	275	22 August 2016
**Robinson College, Cambridge**	155	95	Wadham College, Oxford	250	29 August 2016
**The Open University**	210	115	University of Salford	325	5 September 2016
**University of Edinburgh**	190	155	Durham University	345	12 September 2016
**Wolfson College, Cambridge**	185	175	School of Oriental and African Studies	360	19 September 2016
Queen's University Belfast	105	165	**University of Birmingham**	270	26 September 2016
**University of St Andrews**	175	145	Worcester College, Oxford	320	3 October 2016
University of Glasgow	135	150	**University of East London**	285	10 October 2016

==== Highest Scoring Losers play-offs ====
Team 1	Score		Team 2	Total	Broadcast date
**Jesus College, Cambridge**	195	155	Queens' College, Cambridge	350	17 October 2016
Durham University	85	270	**School of Oriental and African Studies**	355	31 October 2016

=== Second round ===
Team 1	Score		Team 2	Total	Broadcast date
The Open University	185	195	**University of Edinburgh**	380	7 November 2016
**University of Birmingham**	195	115	University of St Andrews	310	14 November 2016
University of East London	55	195	**University of Warwick**	250	21 November 2016
School of Oriental and African Studies	130	195	**Emmanuel College, Cambridge**	325	28 November 2016
**Wolfson College, Cambridge**	225	140	Jesus College, Cambridge	365	5 December 2016
Robinson College, Cambridge	90	210	**Balliol College, Oxford**	300	12 December 2016
**University of Bristol**	265	70	Oriel College, Oxford	335	2 January 2017
Peterhouse, Cambridge	150	175	**Corpus Christi College, Oxford**	325	9 January 2017

=== Quarter-finals ===
Team 1	Score		Team 2	Total	Broadcast date
**Wolfson College, Cambridge**	165	135	Balliol College, Oxford	300	16 January 2017
University of Bristol	70	250	**Corpus Christi College, Oxford**	320	23 January 2017
University of Warwick	90	200	**Emmanuel College, Cambridge**	290	30 January 2017
**University of Edinburgh**	220	125	University of Birmingham	345	6 February 2017
**Emmanuel College, Cambridge**	170	55	Corpus Christi College, Oxford	225	13 February 2017
**University of Warwick**	120	110	University of Bristol	230	20 February 2017
**University of Edinburgh**	195	160	Wolfson College, Cambridge	355	27 February 2017
University of Birmingham	65	265	**Balliol College, Oxford**	330	6 March 2017
University of Warwick	175	205	**Wolfson College, Cambridge**	380	13 March 2017
Corpus Christi College, Oxford	160	240	**Balliol College, Oxford**	400	20 March 2017

=== Semi-finals ===
Team 1	Score		Team 2	Total	Broadcast date
Emmanuel College, Cambridge	140	170	**Wolfson College, Cambridge**	310	27 March 2017
University of Edinburgh	140	215	**Balliol College, Oxford**	355	3 April 2017

=== Final ===
Team 1	Score		Team 2	Total	Broadcast date
Wolfson College, Cambridge	140	190	**Balliol College, Oxford**	330	10 April 2017

- The trophy and title were awarded to the Balliol team of Freddy Potts, Jacob Lloyd, Joey Goldman, and Benjamin Pope.
- The trophy was presented by Stephen Hawking, on location at Gonville and Caius College, Cambridge.

== Spin-off: Christmas Special 2016 ==
=== Qualification round ===
Each year, a Christmas special sequence is aired featuring distinguished alumni. Out of 7 first-round winners, the top 4 highest-scoring teams progress to the semi-finals. The teams consist of celebrities who represent their alma maters.

- Teams with green scores won their match and achieved a high enough score to return in the next round, teams with red scores lost and were eliminated.
- Teams with grey scores won their first round match but did not achieve a high enough score to return.

Team 1			Team 2	Total	Broadcast date
University of Manchester	55	185	St Anne's College, Oxford	240	19 December 2016
University of Kent	245	35	University of Sussex	280	20 December 2016
City, University of London	145	35	Newcastle University	180	21 December 2016
SOAS, University of London	85	175	University of Leeds	260	22 December 2016
University of Edinburgh	115	60	St Catharine's College, Cambridge	175	23 December 2016
Magdalene College, Cambridge	65	225	St Hilda's College, Oxford	290	25 December 2016
University of Bristol	70	75	University of Nottingham	145	26 December 2016

==== Standings for the winners ====
Rank	Team	Team captain	Score
1	University of Kent	Paul Ross	245
2	St Hilda's College, Oxford	Val McDermid	225
3	St Anne's College, Oxford	Mary Archer	185
4	University of Leeds	Kamal Ahmed	175
5	City, University of London	Samira Ahmed	145
6	University of Edinburgh	Rachael Stirling	115
7	University of Nottingham	Chris Hawkins	75

=== Semi-finals ===
Team 1	Score		Team 2	Total	Broadcast date
University of Kent	130	140	University of Leeds	270	27 December 2016
St Anne's College, Oxford	75	165	St Hilda's College, Oxford	240	28 December 2016

=== Final ===
Team 1	Score		Team 2	Total	Broadcast date
University of Leeds	55	160	St Hilda's College, Oxford	215	29 December 2016

The winning St Hilda's College, Oxford team of Fiona Caldicott, Daisy Dunn, Val McDermid and Adèle Geras beat the University of Leeds team of Louise Doughty, Gus Unger-Hamilton, Kamal Ahmed and Steve Bell.
