= Mark Hall Academy =

Location
- First Avenue; Harlow, Essex, CM17 9LR; England; 51.7788°N 0.1307°E

Information
- Type: Academy
- Motto: Aspire, Endeavour, Achieve
- Established: 1954
- Department for Education URN: 148423 Tables
- Ofsted: Reports
- Principal: Matt Carter
- Gender: Coeducational
- Age: 11 to 16
- Colours: Black, Light Blue, Gold
- Website: www.markhallacademy.org

Mark Hall Academy, formerly Mark Hall Specialist Sport College, is a coeducational secondary school with academy status, located in Harlow, Essex, England.

== History ==
The school was previously a specialist Sports College under the Harlow Education Trust. In September 2013 the school converted to an academy under the sponsorship of the Academy Transformation Trust (ATT) as a result of an Inadequate rating by Ofsted, with Corinne Franceschi as its first Principal and Allan Osborne as Associate Principal. It was judged Good in 2016 but a further inspection in 2020 judged it Inadequate. This led to the transfer of the school's sponsorship from the ATT to the Harlow based BMAT education trust under the advice of the Regional Schools Commissioner. The transfer concluded on 1 January 2021.

== Academic performance and Ofsted ==
In 2012, 25% of all pupils attained five GCSEs at grades A* to C including English and Maths. This is a decrease of 18 percentage points since 2011. The school was subsequently put into special measures by Ofsted. In 2013 this figure was at 27% and, after the school became an academy, improved to 38% in 2014 and 46% in 2015.

Ofsted visited the Academy in May 2016 and awarded the 'Good' grade with outstanding behaviour. The leadership of the Principal was described as inspirational. The Academy's 2016 GCSE results showed a Progress 8 score of -0.08, which is in line with the national average. 51% of pupils earned grades A* to C in GCSE English and Maths.

The Academy was rated 'Inadequate' following an inspection in March 2020. The report noted high staff turnover, "weak teaching" and a failure by "too many" teachers to effectively manage the behaviour of their pupils. Additionally, the school's provisions for safeguarding were described as "not good enough to keep pupils safe."
