= Sutton Community Academy =

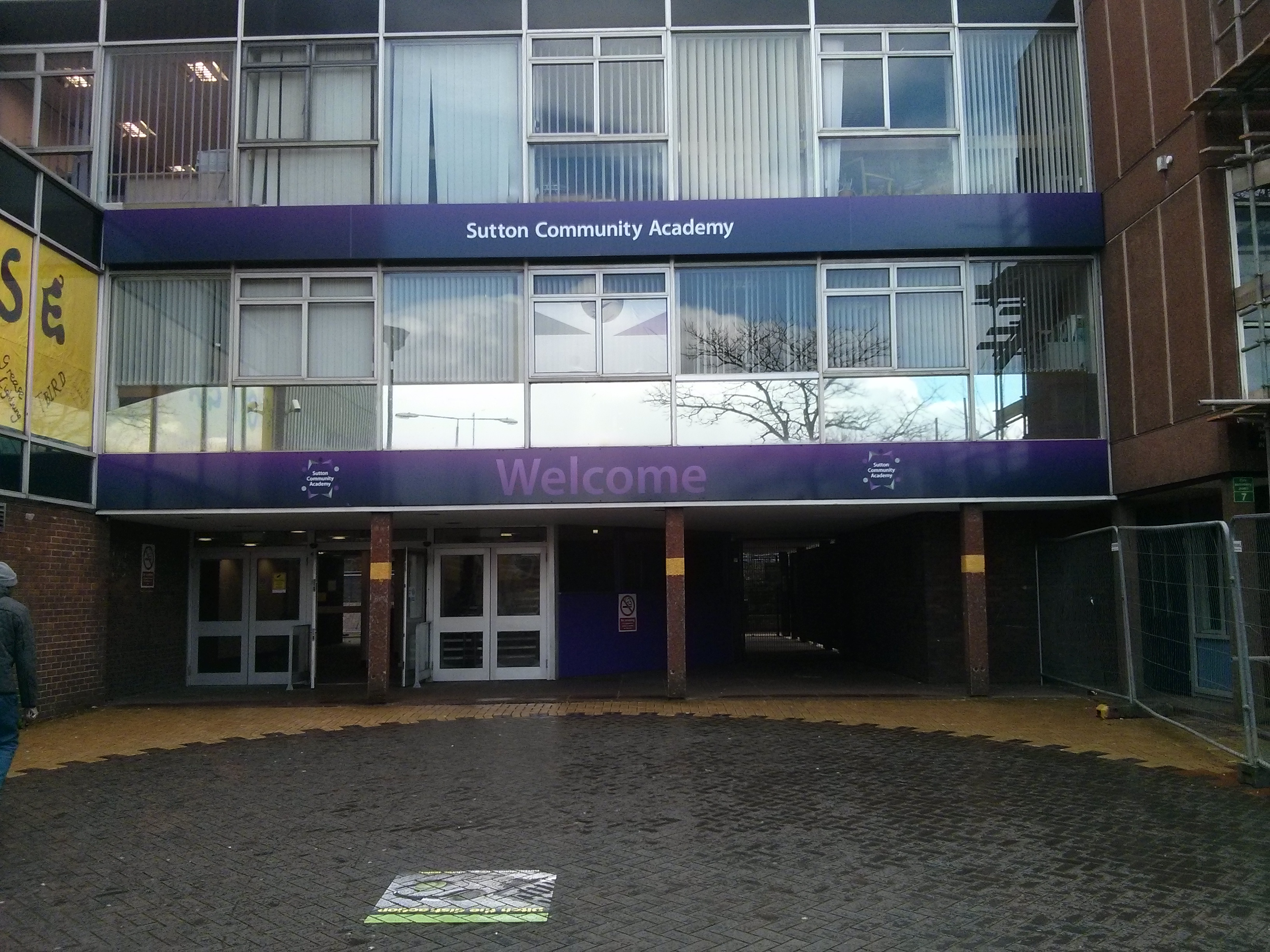

Location
- High Pavement; Sutton-in-Ashfield, Nottinghamshire, NG17 1EE; England; 53°07′26″N 1°15′38″W

Information
- Type: Academy
- Motto: Successful Confident Ambitious
- Established: 1973
- Department for Education URN: 139063 Tables
- Ofsted: Reports
- Principal: Lewis Taylor
- Gender: Coeducational
- Age: 11 to 18
- Enrolment: 903
- Colours: Purple, Black
- Website: www.suttonacademy.attrust.org.uk

Sutton Community Academy (formerly Sutton Centre Community College) is a coeducational secondary school and sixth form with academy status, located in Sutton-in-Ashfield, Nottinghamshire, England.

== History ==
=== Early plans ===
Sutton in Ashfield Urban District councillors in 1966 looked at the possibility of a technical-grammar school between Sutton and Huthwaite.

A £264,770 technical grammar school had been planned in 1960, costing £315,000 by 1963. In 1964 the £328,614 technical grammar school was given the go ahead by the county council. The technical grammar school was being planned by 1966. A model was made of the layout of the new technical grammar school in 1968, in the town centre. Two technical grammar schools had been built at Mansfield in 1957 and 1959, one at Eastwood in 1957, one at Hucknall in 1955, and one in Worksop in 1956.

In 1967 there was a dispute between the Urban Council and the County Council, as to where to put the school.

After 1969, this earlier plan changed to a comprehensive school instead. The school was to be an eight form comprehensive, although the councillors still mostly preferred and expected a technical grammar school, due to the town's textile industry. Quarrydale Comprehensive had opened, but the Sutton Urban councillors saw this type of school as more of an up-to-date secondary modern school with improved buildings. The councillors did not believe that comprehensive schools offered the relevant technical knowledge which they were mostly looking for. Comprehensive school plans in the 1960s were much more favoured by radical city councillors, but in towns such as Sutton-in-Ashfield, the local councillors were more traditional. The local Sutton councillors had also wanted a campus-type school on Leamington Drive, with grammar school, secondary modern school, and a secondary technical school, in the early 1950s.

The Nottinghamshire deputy director of education, James Stone, had joined from Leicestershire, which itself had adopted the community college idea in 1956. This idea was itself borrowed from the village college idea in Cambridgeshire, with joint-use buildings with adult education.

=== Opening ===
Sawston Village College was founded in 1930, the first village college in the UK. The 1967 Plowden Report had commended the virtues of 'community' schools.

There were six coffee bars, staffed by older volunteers, often parents. There was a fully-equipped hairdressing salon. At the start there were 24 teachers with 300 children, to reach 100 teachers, and 1,320 children. Parents could join any class that they liked. Each lesson lasted the entire morning or the entire afternoon, with no hordes of children changing lessons. There was a disco, which was open in the lunchtime. The children were to be equals with the teachers; it was revolutionary.

Leicestershire and Cambridgeshire built similar schools in the early 1970s. It was a form of free-rein and free-form utopian educational communitarianism, which had the most nascent popularity in the early 1970s, but had receded by the late 1970s, and totally disappeared by the 1980s, although many university student unions, to this day, are often notably modelled on this same equal-footing approach.

The county council built schools, and the district council built sports facilities. On 15 September 1970, both councils met and agreed to develop a joint-use school. Another meeting was held in February 1971, between the Labour district and the Conservative county council. At the end of April 1971, the scheme was approved by Nottinghamshire Education Committee. £30,000 came from the district council for the building, and construction started in January 1972 by Searsons Ltd, under the CLASP building technique. The headteacher was the former head of Geography at Rushcliffe Technical Grammar School for Boys.

In 1970 it was to be called the Garden Lane Comprehensive School. Sutton-in-Ashfield Girls' Grammar School closed in July 1970, which had opened in 1920. There were three phases, to cost £1,330,207.

The school was featured on 'The Education Debate' at 11.30pm, on Tuesday 15 March 1977 on BBC1, presented by Harry Rée, a former grammar school head. On Monday 8 December 1980, David Hawksworth of Woman's Hour visited the school. The school was also featured on the 'Education Roadshow' on Radio 4, on Sunday 12 October 1986.

=== Buildings ===
A similar school, for 1,320 children was proposed in early 1975, to open in September 1977, to be known as Kirkby Centre, in the town centre, not the outskirts of the town; today this is Outwood Academy Kirkby. It was reduced in buildings, and does not have a sixth form.

The leisure facilities, known as Sutton Recreation Centre, opened 18 months late, on Monday February 7, 1977, with a sports centre and squash courts, six badminton courts. The theatre had 230 seats, with two licensed bars and restaurant, was not complete by February 1977, but would open later in the year. It was to cost £720,000 but this was now over £1m. The new Ashfield Council took over running the new leisure centre. The theatre, two licensed bars, and restaurant opened in September 1977.

=== Attainment ===
The school (intentionally) only offered CSEs, not O-levels. Stewart Wilson, the headteacher, in April 1975 decided not to have O-levels; the headteacher said that it was 'a fairer thing to do', for the 'slower learners'. The school had no ambition. The county council were not happy, and many parents, that the anarchic school did not offer O-levels.

By the 1990s, it was a failing school.

=== Incidents ===
- There had been a difficulty with 'lessons in swear words', by teacher Brian Keywood, in October 1977. Mr Keywood had previously been employed by the Marriage Guidance Council in Nottingham. The county council investigated the situation, after many complaints from angry parents. It was heavily reported by 'The Sun' and 'Daily Mirror' newspapers.
- A Technology teacher was punched in March 1995. Chris Bentley was hit by a 15 year old boy, with his jaw broken in three places; the teacher had to have a wired jaw procedure. The teacher had graduated from Nottingham Polytechnic in 1990. The 15 year old boy had been expelled from another school, and was also expelled from the Sutton school.

=== Academy ===
The school was awarded dual Specialist Business and Enterprise College and Arts College status, before becoming an academy in January 2013.

== Headteachers ==
- Stewart Wilson, he had been deputy head of Moorside High School, Werrington in Staffordshire, then head of a Middlesbrough school from 1966. The headteacher, a father of five - Andrew, Felicity, Hilary, Julian and Danny, was aged 45 originally from Aberdeen. He left in April 1978, to join the new £3.2m Deans Community High School in Livingston in Scotland, as head teacher. He retired from Livingston in 1986. Jim Telfer was his deputy headmaster. On Wednesday August 1993 he was leading a party of climbers, aged 59, over Aonach Eagach. He slipped and fell 200 feet.

== School performance ==
In 2019 the school was inspected by Ofsted and judged Inadequate. A new principal and senior leadership team were put in place in 2021, and Ofsted found that the school was improving. In 2022 the school was inspected again and judged Good.
