= Limpenhoe Meadows =

Protected area in Norfolk, England

Coordinates: 52.573°N 1.537°E

- Site of Special Scientific Interest
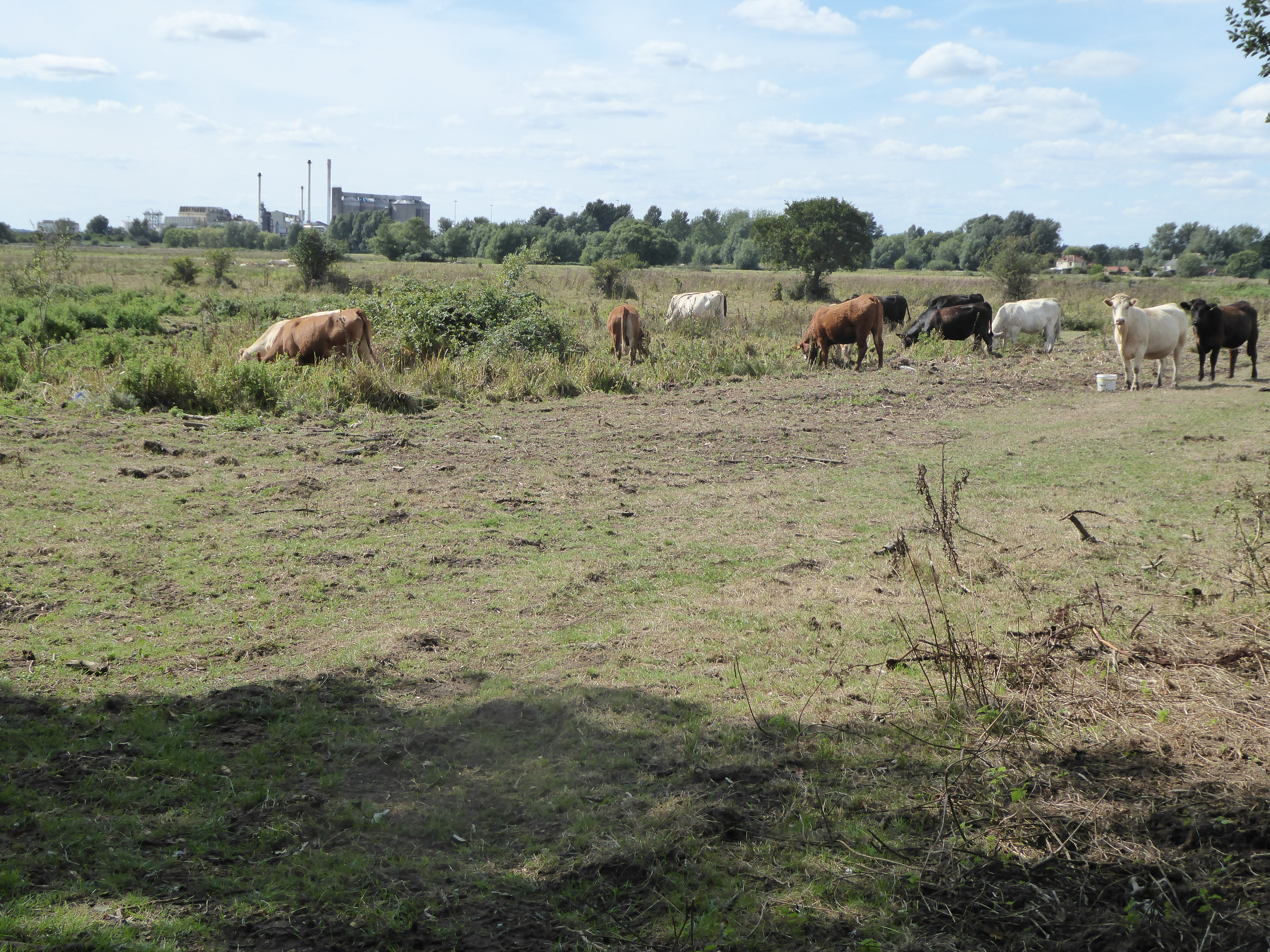
- Location of Limpenhoe Meadows.
- Area of search: Norfolk
- Grid reference: TG 398 031
- Interest: Biological
- Area: 12.0 hectares (30 acres)
- Notification date: 1985
- Location map: Magic Map

Limpenhoe Meadows is a 12-hectare (30-acre) biological Site of Special Scientific Interest west of Reedham in Norfolk, England. It is part of the Broadland Ramsar site and Special Protection Area, and The Broads Special Area of Conservation.

This area of unimproved fen grassland in the valley of the River Yare has a network of dykes. The soils vary from alluvial clays in the valley bottom to poorly drained peats higher up. The meadows are species-rich with some uncommon plants. Aquatic plants in the dykes include the nationally rare sharp-leaved pondweed.

The site is private land with no public access.
