= Westbourne Academy =

Location
- Marlow Road; Ipswich, Suffolk, IP1 5JN; England
- Coordinates: 52.07408°N 1.12137°E

Information
- Type: Academy
- Opened: September 1939
- Local authority: Suffolk
- Trust: Academy Transformation Trust
- Department for Education URN: 139288 Tables
- Ofsted: Reports
- Principal: Martin Higgon
- Staff: 69
- Gender: Coeducational
- Age: 11 to 16
- Enrollment: 1027
- Colours: Blue, Red, Yellow, Green, Purple
- Website: http://www.westbourne.attrust.org.uk/
- Last updated: 16 October 2024

Westbourne Academy is a secondary school with academy status located in Ipswich, Suffolk, England. It is a co-educational school for students aged 11–16 with post-16 provision accommodated at the Suffolk One sixth form centre. The field used to be home of Ipswich Phoenix Football Club, and is now used by Ipswich Valley Rangers.

The school has been known by many different names since 1939, such as, Western Senior Girls' School, Westbourne School, Westbourne High School and Westbourne Sports College before becoming an academy in February 2013. It is now part of the Academy Transformation Trust.

== Notable alumni ==
- Kirk Degiorgio, techno producer and DJ.
- Kieron Dyer, former Newcastle United, Ipswich Town and England midfielder.
- Jamie Hawkesworth, fashion and documentary photographer.
- Sean Hedges-Quinn, sculptor, animator and, film model and prop-maker.
- Ian Payne, ITV Tyne Tees presenter.
