= Percy Monkman =

English painter

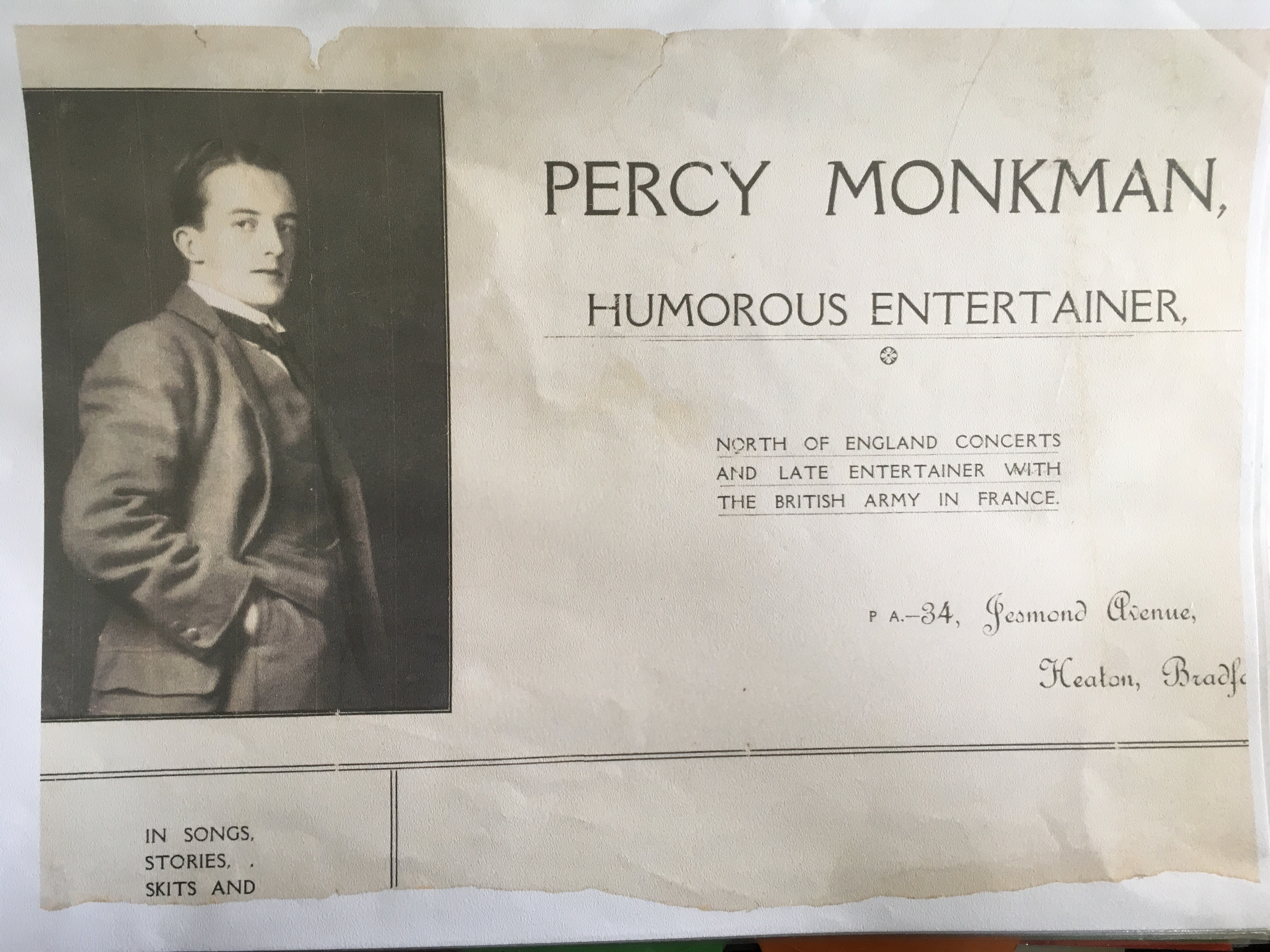
Percy Monkman

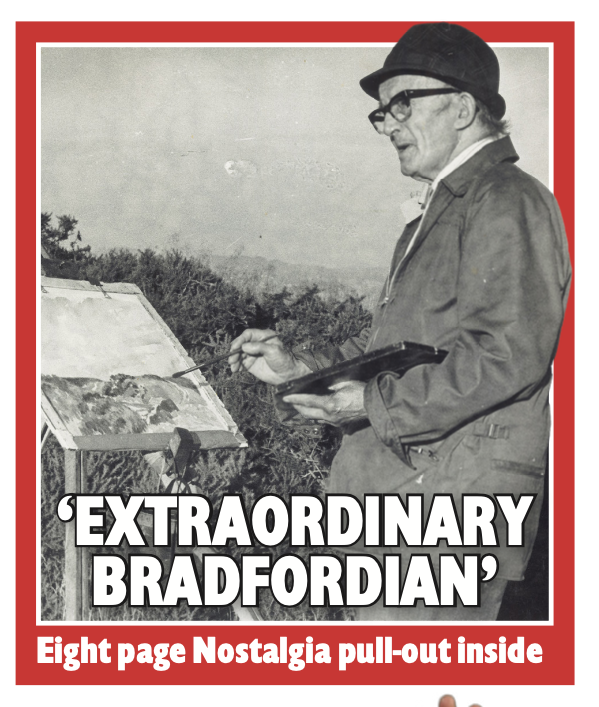

Percy Monkman, entertainer, actor and painter (1892–1986), was born in Bradford where he lived until retirement (1952) when he moved to Baildon 5 miles (8 km) away at the edge of the moors.

== Life ==
In 1909, aged 17, he joined Beckett's Bank (which was taken over by The Westminster Bank in 1921).

A year after World War I broke out, he joined the Royal Army Medical Corps (RAMC). After a few months he found a talent for entertaining other soldiers as a pierrot with the 13th Corps Concert Party and did this for the rest of the war in up to 300 events.

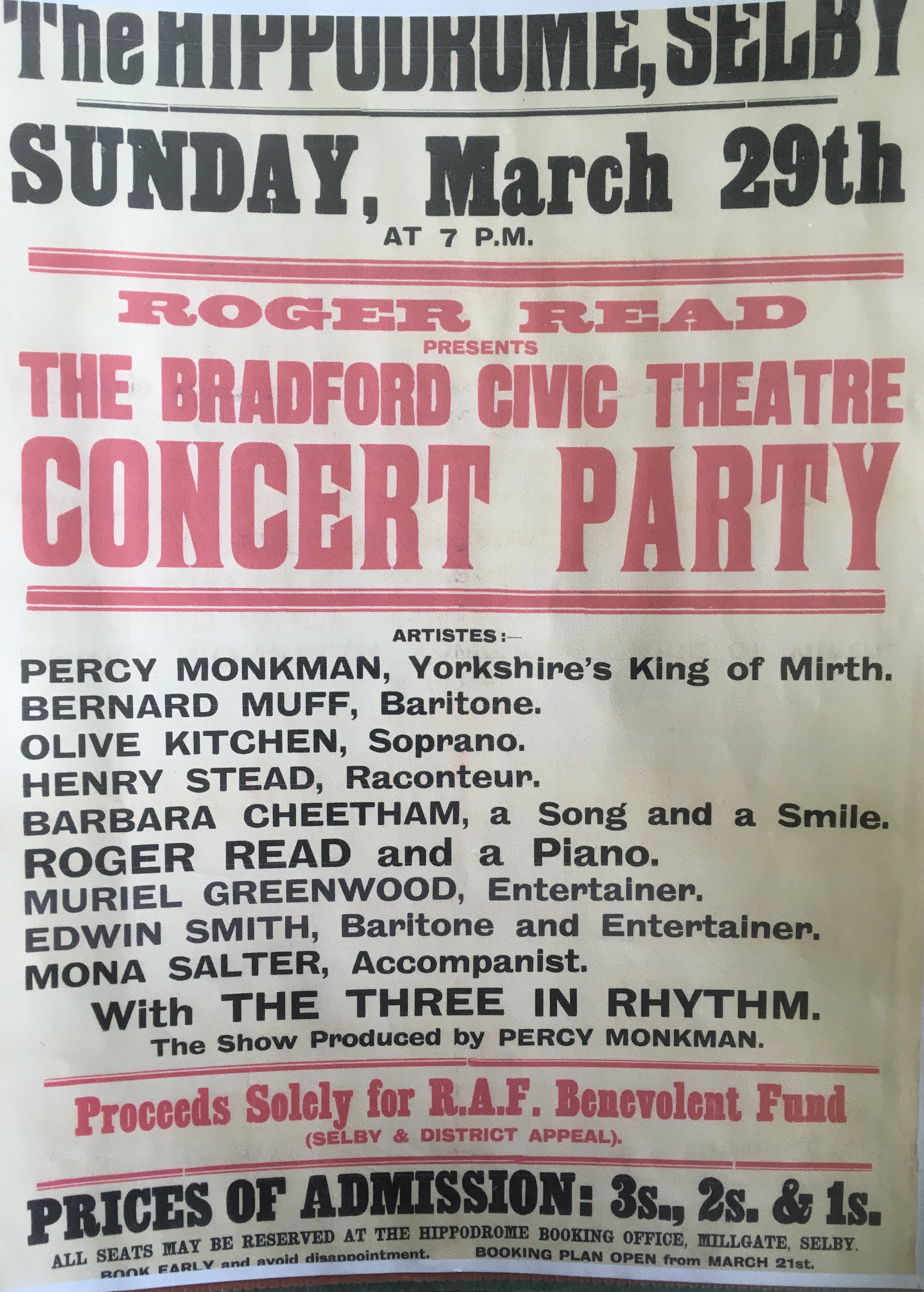
Flyer for The Bradford Civic Theatre Concert Party at the Hippodrome

After the war, he returned to the bank in Bradford and continued as a compere and comedian. In 1935, he joined the Bradford Civic Theatre, where he performed in many productions, usually in comic roles. Many were plays by JB Priestley, a man of letters, lifelong friend, and the most celebrated Bradfordian of that generation.

He also took up painting, mainly in watercolours. He studied at the Bradford School of Art and joined Bradford Arts Club where he remained a member for over 60 years, serving later as vice-chairman, chairman and president. He painted predominantly town and country scenes around Bradford, the Brontë Country and the Yorkshire Dales, particularly Wharfedale and Airedale. He exhibited widely throughout Yorkshire and also at the Royal Institute of Painters in Water Colours (the RI). He was a regular contributor for the Dalesman magazine. After retirement, he could devote all his time to painting for the rest of his life.

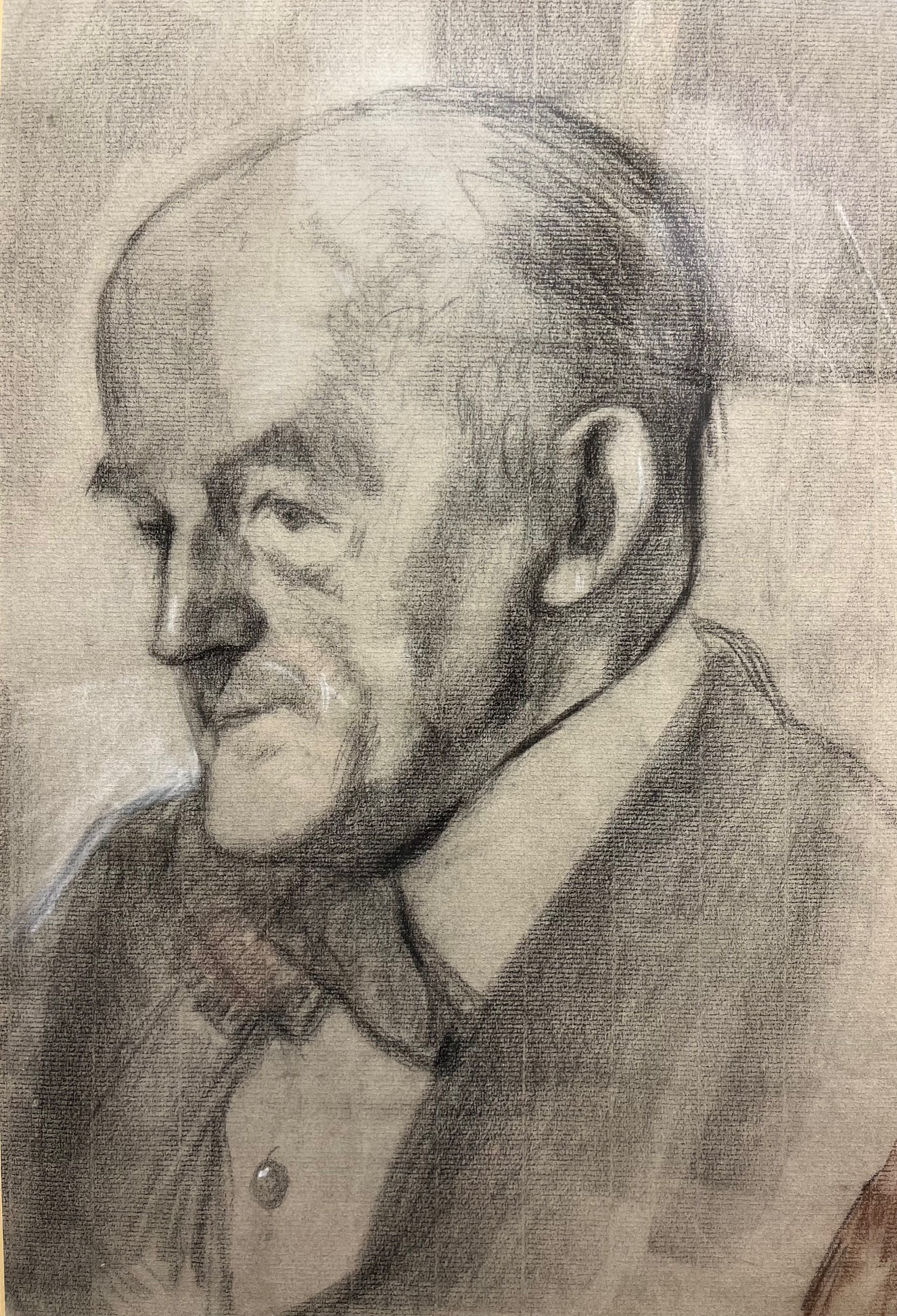

He was very prolific, and his work was widely respected by his peers and the general public.

As well as his friendship with JB Priestley, he had many friends connected with the worlds of both art and the theatre in Bradford and the wider West Riding.

He was also a passionate supporter of Bradford City AFC, having been born within a mile of Valley Parade and even trialed for the club as a teenager. When growing up in the Toller Lane area, he and JB Priestley regularly played football together (Toller Lane Tykes and Saltburn United). A photograph of Percy was published in the Sunday Times on 19 May 1985, showing him paying his final visit to Valley Parade the day after the tragedy of the Bradford City Fire on 11 May 1985 when 56 people lost their lives and 250 suffered injuries.

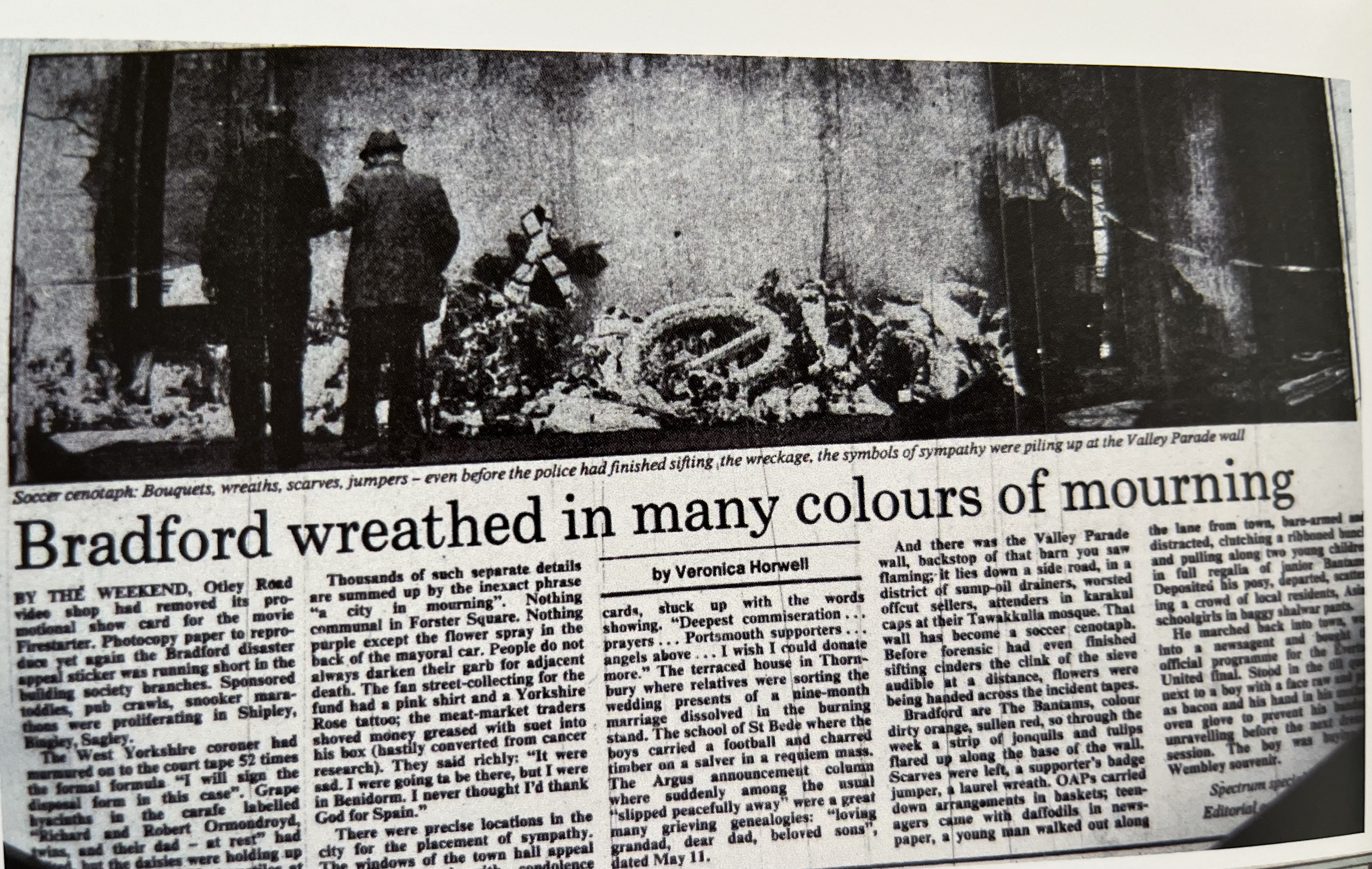
The Sunday Times newspaper clipping showing Percy

In March 2018, Percy's grandson, Martin Greenwood, published a comprehensive biography about him entitled Percy Monkman: An Extraordinary Bradfordian. Whilst researching the book, Greenwood was hospitalized after breathing in spores from his grandfather's 100-year-old documents.

== See also ==
Monkman surname.
