= The Dukeries Academy =

Location
- Whinney Lane; New Ollerton, Nottinghamshire; England; 53.2093°N 1.0004°W

Information
- Type: Academy
- Established: September 1964
- Local authority: Nottinghamshire
- Department for Education URN: 139062 Tables
- Ofsted: Reports
- Gender: Mixed
- Age: 11 to 19
- Website: The Dukeries Academy

The Dukeries Academy (formerly The Dukeries Comprehensive School and then The Dukeries College and Complex) is a secondary school and community college situated in Ollerton, Nottinghamshire.

== History ==
It opened in September 1964, with Kirkby in Ashfield Comprehensive School, the first Nottinghamshire county comprehensive schools; Fairham Comprehensive School in Nottingham had preceded these schools. The school was dedicated to 'community provision' at a time when the village and neighbouring Edwinstowe and Bilsthorpe, who attended the school, were thriving mining communities. The school/college/academy had its 50th anniversary in 2014.

It had a residential training centre, the Ollerton Educational Institute. It had a purpose-built theatre. There were 1290 children.

The first headmaster was Mr John Ireland West, who was born in Kirkby-in-Ashfield, and lived in Upton, Newark and Sherwood. He had two sons.

Extensions were constructed from 1967, to increase to the school to a ten-form entry, and to add a sixth form of 90, which would cost £153,563.

A Sub-Aqua Group was formed in January 1967. In April 1969 it acquired a residential field studies centre in North Wales at Trawsfynydd, which was provided by Rexco smokeless fuels. This was opened on 4 July 1970 by Richard Marsh, Baron Marsh, former Minister of Transport.

The new sixth form opened in February 1970. By 1971, there were 1800 at the school. There were too many children at the school in the early 1970s.

In 1975 an arsonist set fire to the gym, needing 18 firemen. In June 1975, the headteacher was awarded the CBE in the 1975 Birthday Honours. Two squash courts opened in April 1976.

In 2009, The Dukeries was included in controversial plans to cut funding. Nottinghamshire County Council proposed to cut £380,000 of the schools budget to save money. There was a campaign to stop these cuts from happening.

The attached Leisure Centre (owned by NSDC) received an extension to include a new swimming pool in 2020, and the structure was built and completed in 2021. The pool was officially opened by Olympic gold medalist Rebecca Adlington.

== Curriculum ==
It offers education for students aged 11–19. ATTFE College, the school's sixth form, also offer a range of level 2 and 3 courses, including GCSEs and BTECs.

== Visits ==
The Princess Royal opened a whitewater centre on the afternoon of Tuesday 17 May 1988.

The Earl of Wessex visited the Enviro Centre on Thursday 1 July 2004.

The Dukeries was visited by Ed Balls, Sebastian Coe, and Gordon Brown.

Balls described it as "a school of the 21st century". The school received a "satisfactory" grade after an OFSTED inspection. The school became an academy on 1 January 2013, and was renamed The Dukeries Academy. The Dukeries offers a theatre, horse riding, on-site counselling, a construction block (opened in 2008), an astro-turf pitch, a youth club and a fire service training centre.

== Former teachers ==
- Barry Troyna, drama
