= Eric Monkman =

Canadian academic and television personality (born 1987)

- Born: July 4, 1987 (age 39); Oakville, Ontario, Canada
- Education: University of Waterloo; Wolfson College, Cambridge

Eric Monkman (born c. 1987) is a Canadian academic and television personality based in the United Kingdom.

Monkman comes from Oakville, Ontario, Canada. His father, a doctor, died when Eric was thirteen. Monkman obtained his first degree from the University of Waterloo and then studied for a master's degree in economics at Wolfson College, Cambridge, when he captained the college's University Challenge team. The team lost in the 2017 final to a team from Balliol College, Oxford.

His girlfriend, Jiang Na teaches law at Beijing Normal University. Viewers described him as the most intense contestant ever: a reviewer called him an "unexpected hero".

== Television career ==
Together with Bobby Seagull, Monkman presented the BBC Radio 4 programme Monkman and Seagull’s Polymathic Adventure, and wrote the quiz book The Monkman and Seagull Quiz Book published by Eyewear Publishing in October 2017. They presented Monkman & Seagull's Genius Guide to Britain, a four-part series on BBC Two, first broadcast in 2018. The show was commissioned for a second series in 2019.

In December 2022, Monkman competed alongside Bobby Seagull in BBC's Celebrity Antiques Road Trip.

Monkman appearances on gameshows such as Quizmaster and University Challenge, a UK based quiz show is where he gained his online popularity. His success in trivia lead to the online phenomenon entitled Monkmania which consisted of a surge following and interest of his lively facial expressions and his intellect.
