= Methwold =

Village in Norfolk, England

Coordinates: 52.5167°N 0.55°E

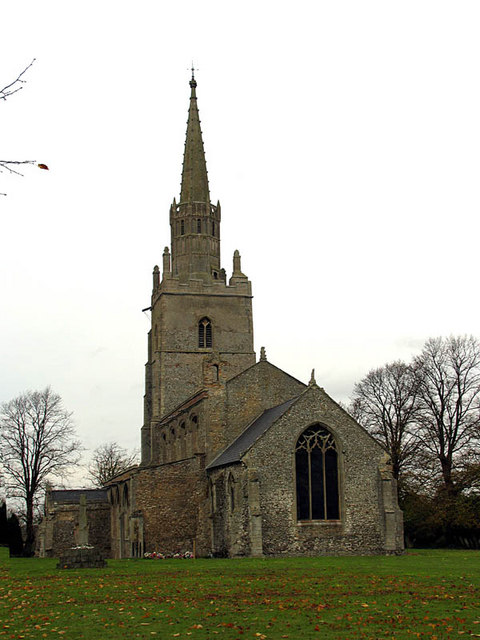
- St George, Methwold

- Location within Norfolk
- Area: 49.12 km^{2} (18.97 sq mi)
- Population: 1,502 (2011)
  - Density: 31/km^{2} (80/sq mi)
- OS grid reference: TL731940
- Civil parish: Methwold
- District: King's Lynn and West Norfolk
- Shire county: Norfolk
- Region: East
- Country: England
- Sovereign state: United Kingdom
- Post town: THETFORD
- Postcode district: IP26
- Dialling code: 01366
- Police: Norfolk
- Fire: Norfolk
- Ambulance: East of England
- UK Parliament: South West Norfolk

Methwold ("Middle forest") is a village and civil parish in the English county of Norfolk, on the edge of the Norfolk Fens and Breckland. With an area of 49 km^{2} (19 sq mi) it is the second largest parish in Norfolk. It had a population of 1,502 in 591 households at the 2011 Census, up by less than 2% from 1,476 at the 2001 census, For the purposes of local government, it falls within the district of King's Lynn and West Norfolk.

== Geographical and historical overview ==
The parish also includes the hamlets of Methwold Hythe, approximately 1 mile (1.6 km) west of the village and on the edge of the fens, and Brookville to the north west.

Its economy is based on agriculture with a little light industry, some of which now occupies the former WWII bomber base, RAF Methwold, located just to the south of the village. The village is situated about 20 miles (32 km) from King's Lynn and 15 miles (24 km) north west of Thetford (its postal town).

The Duchy of Lancaster Methwold CofE Primary School is in the parish, as is the secondary school Iceni Academy, previously known as Methwold High School.

Methwold parish is the second largest parish in Norfolk in terms of area. The parish currently has approximately 20 farms ranging from about 60 acres (24 ha) up to 1,000 acres (400 ha). Farming in Methwold and the surrounding areas accounts for a vast majority of jobs in the fens. Even if people do not farm, much of the work is connected with the land.

Methwold became famous for its abundance and excellence of its rabbits, which were sold by poulterers as "Muel Rabbits". According to John Marius Wilson, Methwold was formerly a market town. A meal of Muel Rabbits was reputed to have pleased the king to such an extent that he granted the village a charter for the market to be held.

The village was struck by an F1/ T2 tornado on 23 November 1981, during the record-breaking nationwide tornado outbreak on that day.

== Notable residents ==
- William Thorold M.Inst.C.E., millwright, architect and civil engineer was born in Methwold on 9 October 1798.
- Richard Maurice Bucke, M.D., psychiatrist, author and philosopher was born in Methwold 18 March 1837.
