= Academies Financial Handbook =

Handbook issued by Education and Skills Funding Agency in England

Academies Financial Handbook is a handbook issued by Education and Skills Funding Agency in England that sets out finance-related requirements for academy trusts in terms "musts" and "shoulds".

The Handbook was first published in September 2006. It was substantially revised in 2012. Since then it has been updated annually.

== Overview ==
Academy schools are state-funded schools in England which are directly funded by the Department for Education and independent of local authority control. The terms of the arrangements are set out in individual Academy Funding Agreements. Most academies are secondary schools (and most secondary schools are academies). However, slightly more than 25% of primary schools (4363 as at December 2017). There are no academies in Wales or Scotland where education has been devolved

Academies are self-governing non-profit charitable trusts and may receive additional support from personal or corporate sponsors, either financially or in kind.

The Education Funding Agency monitors financial management and governance of academies. In March 2016 the Perry Beeches The Academy Trust, a multi-academy trust, was found to have deleted financial records for £2.5 million of free school meal funding, and that the chief executive was being paid by sub-contractors as well as by the trust. Its schools are likely to be taken over by a new trust. In August 2016, the former principal and founder of Kings Science Academy, the former finance director, and a former teacher who was the founder's sister were found guilty of defrauding public funds of £150,000.

In October 2017, the Wakefield City Academies Trust collapsed, and The Observer reported that "Wakefield City Academies Trust now stands accused of 'asset stripping” after it transferred millions of pounds of the schools’ savings to its own accounts before collapsing. On 8 September it released a statement announcing it would divest itself of its 21 schools as it could not undertake the ´rapid improvement our academies need' ". The Academies Financial Handbook describes the correct way of managing public assets. 'Compliance with the handbook is a condition of each trust’s funding agreement'.

== Document ==
The Academies Financial Handbook sets out the financial management, control and reporting requirements that apply to all academy trusts. It describes a financial framework for trusts that focuses on principles rather than detailed guidance and reflects their accountability to Parliament and to the public.

It is sixty sides long, and is divided into four sections with a foreword and appendices.

- Part 1: Roles and responsibilities
- Part 2: Main financial and governance requirements

2.1 Financial oversight
2.2 Financial planning, monitoring and reporting
2.3 Internal control
2.4 Internal scrutiny
2.5 Transparency

- Part 3: Delegated authorities

3.1 Proper and regular use of public funds
3.2 Trading with connected parties
3.3 Novel, contentious and repercussive transactions
3.4 Borrowing
3.5 Gifts
3.6 Write-offs and entering into liabilities
3.7 Special payments
3.8 Acquisition and disposal of fixed assets
3.9 Leasing
3.10 Managing the General Annual Grant (GAG)
3.11 Applicability of delegations and freedoms

- Part 4: Audit requirements

4.1 Statutory audit
4.2 Regularity audit
4.3 Financial management and governance self-assessment
4.4 Funding audit
4.5 National Audit Office and Public Accounts Committee
4.6 Audit access rights
4.7 Provision of information
4.8 Investigation of fraud, theft and/or irregularity

== Compliance ==
Some governing bodies have difficulty with the document. The Commons public accounts committee concluded that “too often academy trusts are falling short” of the “highest standards of governance, accountability and financial management” and that the Department for Education is often “too slow to react”. In May 2018, The Guardian highlighted the failings in one multi-academy trust comprising four primary schools. The schools serving 2000 pupils were awarding the head a salary in excess of £211,082 which had been raised by 10% from the year before. She had taken £6 250 to fund a fact finding mission to the far east. In 2014, £26,000 had been spent on refurbishing the heads office.Four of her staff had been issued with £1 250 laptops while the school had been running an in-year deficit of almost £1 000 000. “Discussions with both the head and the acting chair of the board demonstrated a poor understanding of the current financial situation of the trust.” Also criticised was the way that large contracts for consultancy and advertising were taken out without following the tender procedure, and invoices could be produced.
