= Steggles =

Steggles may refer to:

- Steggles (surname), a family name originating from Old English
- Steggles Pty Ltd, an Australian poultry business under Baiada Poultry

== See also ==
- Steagles, a temporary National Football League team
