= Darwin College, Cambridge =

Constituent college of the University of Cambridge

Darwin College
- University of Cambridge
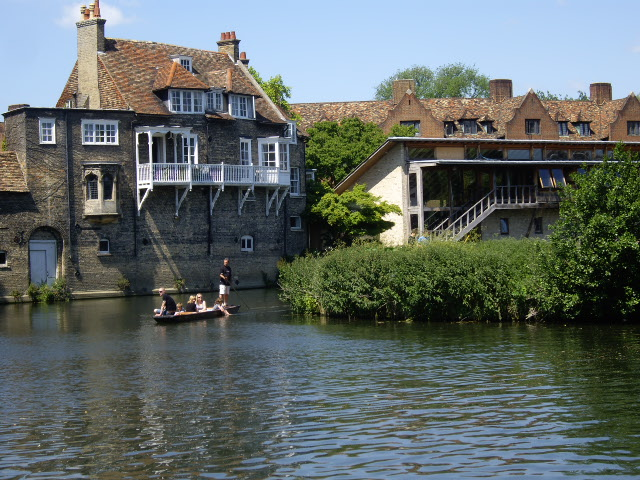
- Darwin College's buildings from the River Cam

- Arms: Argent, on a bend gules cottised vert between two mullets each within an annulet gules three escallops or (for Darwin) impaling Per fess dancetty azure and gules, a caduceus between in chief two roses Or (for Rayne); all within a bordure Or.
Scarf colours: blue, with two equally-spaced narrow sets of three adjacent red, Cambridge blue and yellow stripes, with the red stripes closest to the edge of the scarf, and the yellow stripes closest to the centre
- Location: Silver Street
- Coordinates: 52°12′02″N 0°06′49″E
- Abbreviation: DAR
- Founders: Gonville & Caius College; St John's College; Trinity College
- Established: 1964
- Named after: The Darwin Family
- Sister college: Wolfson College, Oxford
- Master: Nigel Peake
- Undergraduates: None
- Postgraduates: 750 (2022-23)
- Endowment: £24.9m (2023)
- Visitor: Lords Chief Justices of England and Wales ex officio
- Website: www.darwin.cam.ac.uk
- DCSA: www.dcsa.darwin.cam.ac.uk
- Boat club: Darwin College Boat Club

Map
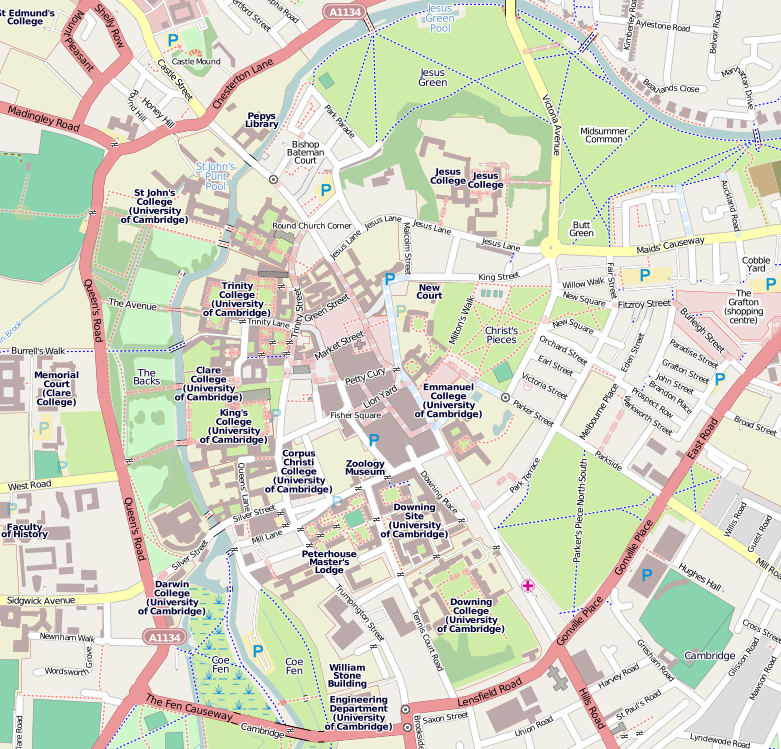
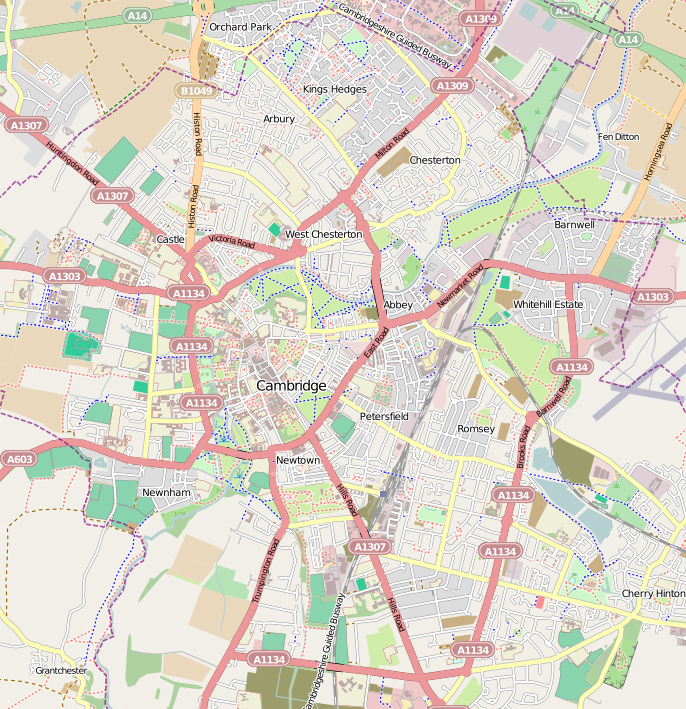
- Location within Central Cambridge Location within Cambridge

Darwin College is a constituent college of the University of Cambridge. Founded on 28 July 1964, Darwin was Cambridge University's first graduate-only college, and also the first to admit both men and women. The college is named after the family of Charles Darwin who previously owned some of the land, Newnham Grange, on which the college now stands.

The college has between 650 and 800 students, mostly studying for PhD or MPhil degrees with strengths in the sciences, humanities, and law. Darwin is the largest graduate college in Cambridge. Darwin's sister college at Oxford University is Wolfson College.

Members of Darwin College are termed Darwinians and alumni include British primatologist and anthropologist Jane Goodall, American conservationist Dian Fossey, Barbadian Governor-General Elliott Belgrave, Nobel Prize winners Elizabeth Blackburn, Eric Maskin and John Clarke, Solicitor-General of the United States Paul Clement, Global Energy Prize winning scientist Thorsteinn I. Sigfusson, and Pulitzer Prize nominated neurosurgeon Paul Kalanithi.

== History ==
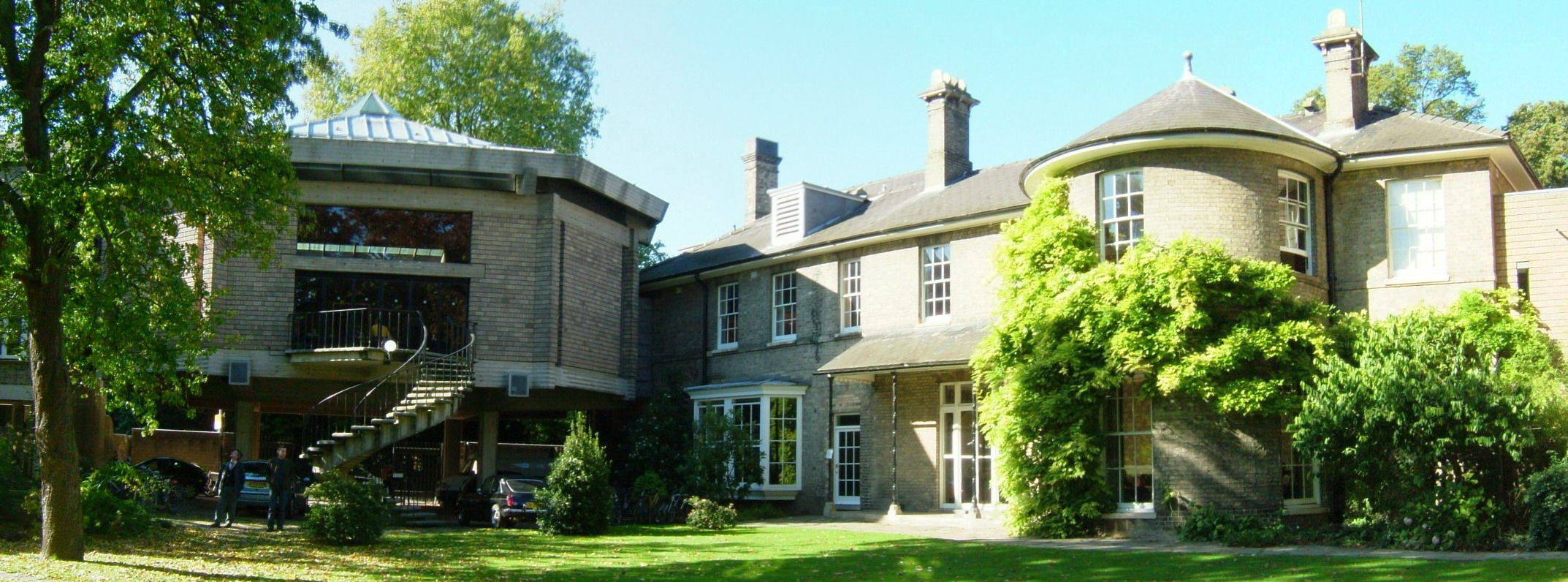
Main Building

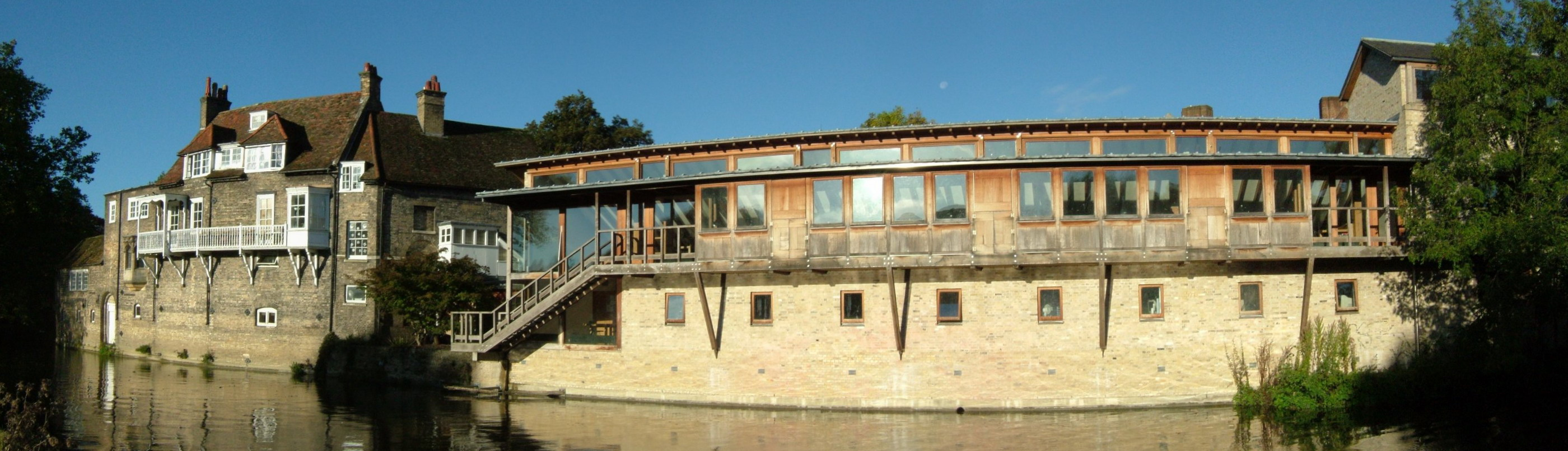
Darwin College Library from the millpond

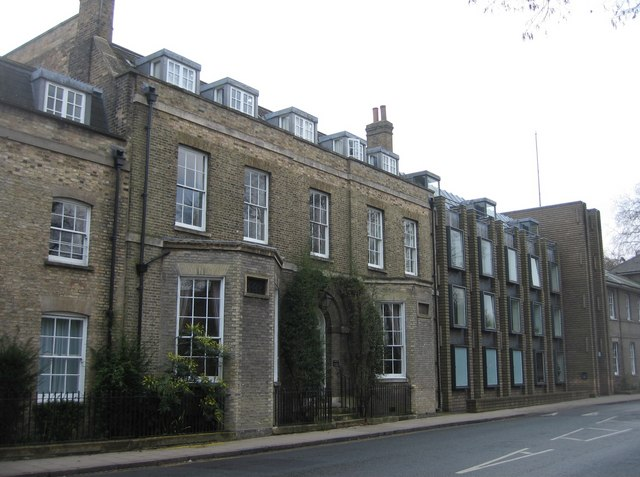
Silver Street

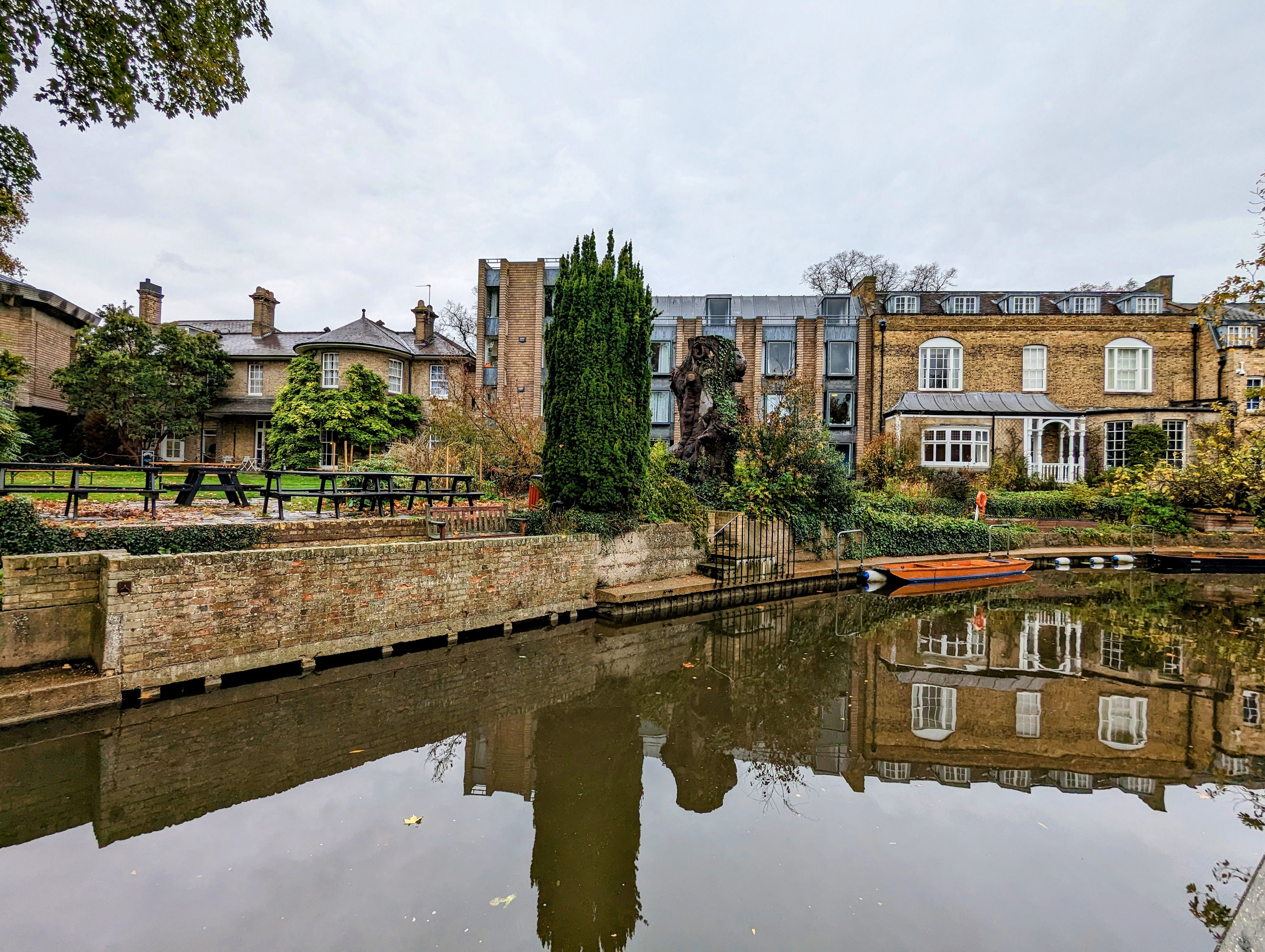
Main courtyard

A significant increase in the number of postgraduate students at Cambridge University in the post-war period led to a growing realisation that a graduate college was becoming a necessity. In 1963, three of the university's older colleges – Trinity College, St John's College, and Gonville and Caius College – announced their intention to jointly form a new, wholly graduate college. The college was established in 1964, located on the bank of the River Cam, opposite Queens' College. On 29 January 1965, the Privy Council gave formal approval to the college as an Approved Foundation. It received its Royal Charter as an independent college within the university in 1976.

The college is named after the Darwin family, Charles Darwin's second son, George Darwin, having owned some of the property which the college now occupies. He bought Newnham Grange, the oldest part of the college, in 1885, together with the adjacent building known as The Old Granary, and Small Island. (Newnham Grange was originally built in 1793 for the family of Patrick Beales, a local corn and coal merchant. It was extensively remodelled by George Darwin.)

Following the death of George's son, Sir Charles Galton Darwin, in 1962, those concerned with the foundation of the new college learned that the property was to become available. Katherine, Lady Darwin, and her family were very receptive to the idea of their home becoming the nucleus of a new college, and to the suggestion that it should bear the family's name. Family portraits of the Darwin family are on loan to the college from the Darwin Heirloom Trust and can be found on the walls of several of the college's main rooms. In the book Period Piece: A Cambridge Childhood, the granddaughter of Charles Darwin, Gwen Raverat describes how she grew up at Newnham Grange.

A commemorative book entitled Darwin College: A 50th Anniversary Portrait was commissioned and published by the college in 2014 to commemorate the 50th anniversary of the founding of the college in 1964.

== Buildings ==
Darwin College is known for its distinctive Georgian and Victorian architecture, gardens, and college site which is integrated into the nearby River Cam.

Located on Silver Street and Newnham Road, the college is also known for the Darwin College Bridges which connect the college grounds with the two islands of the college.

In 1966 the college acquired the Hermitage (a house built in the nineteenth century on the west side of Newnham Grange) from St John's College. Work to convert and extend the college's buildings was funded by the founding colleges and through substantial donations from the Rayne Foundation established by Sir Max Rayne, a Jewish businessman and philanthropist.

In 1994 Darwin College completed construction of a new library and study centre along the side of The Old Granary. The centre is built on a narrow strip of land alongside the millpond in Cambridge, and uses a structure of green oak and lime mortar brickwork. The building uses high-level automatically opening windows and a chimney to control natural ventilation.

In 2004, the college acquired the Malting House to accommodate 12 students. The Malting House is Grade II listed and its name reflects the original purpose of the building. The building was the home of the Malting House School, which experimented with radical ideas in education in the 1920s.

In 2010 the college acquired No 4 Newnham Terrace, the former Rectory for the Church of St Mary the Less, Cambridge (Little St Mary's) thereby finally establishing an entire boundary for the college from Queen's Bridge to Newnham Road and to the River Granta. The long boundary returns to Queen's Bridge and is formed by the two islands in the middle of the river.

== Academic profile ==
Darwin College has particular strengths across a range of subjects and is particularly strong in the sciences, law, and humanities with the majority of the postgraduate students graduating with PhDs and MPhils in these academic subjects.

As a postgraduate college, Darwin College is not ranked in the Tompkins Table ranking of Cambridge colleges that provide undergraduate studies.

== Student life ==
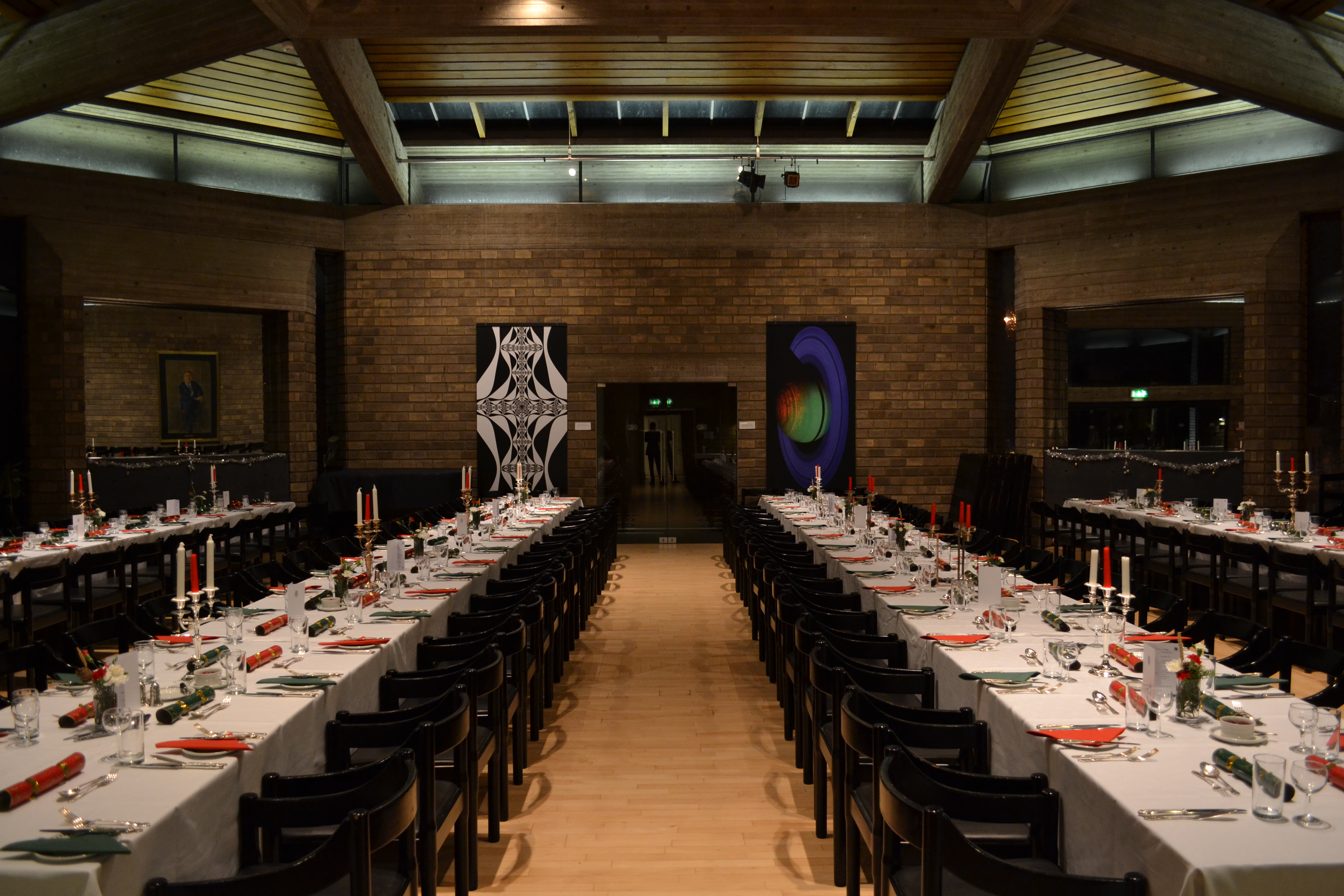
Darwin College Dining Hall, Christmas 2011

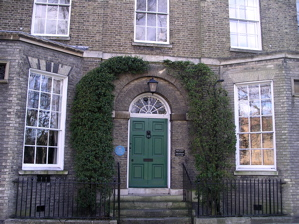
Newnham Grange

The college organises the annual prestigious Darwin Lecture Series, eight talks over eight weeks structured around a single theme (such as 'Power') examined from very different perspectives (scientific, humanities, arts), given by eminent speakers who are leading international authorities in their fields. The lectures have been hosted for over twenty-five years and form one of the key events in the Cambridge calendar. Most of the series of lectures have been published as books and the more recent series are also available as videos for free live-streaming and download. Past speakers at the Darwin Lecture Series have included Sir Walter Bodmer, Rose George, Andrew Fabian, and historian David Olusoga. The inaugural lecture was given by Karl Popper.

The college has a 24-hour library and study centre overlooking the River Cam and provides extensive punting for its students.

In sports, Darwin College Boat Club is a popular student society at Darwin College, as well as Darwin College Football Club who play in the long established Cambridge University Association Football League (CUAFL), representing the only graduate college within CUAFL. The club plays throughout the year in and out of term.

The college has regular formal dinners with students and fellows and also holds annual May Balls during Cambridge's May Week. In 2023, Darwin College became the first University of Cambridge college to have a fully plant-based May Ball.

Every Darwinian is automatically a member of the Darwin College Student Association (DCSA). The DCSA committee comprises 20 students, organising events and parties, supporting societies, and helping students make the most of their time in Cambridge.

The Darwin College University Challenge team achieved some success on University Challenge in the 2018-2019 season reaching the semi-finals of the competition led by captain Jason Golfinos and again reached the semi-finals in the 2024-25 season, led by captain Harrison Whitaker and in the 2024-25 season, led by captain Louis Cameron. The college team also reached the first-round of the 2020-21 season of University Challenge.

== Notable alumni ==
Darwin College is associated with a number of distinguished alumni in fields such as scientists, lawyers, politicians, academics, civil servants, diplomats, and representatives of international organisations.

Elizabeth Blackburn, the 2009 Nobel laureate in medicine, studied for her PhD at Darwin. Eric Maskin, the 2007 Nobel laureate in economics, was a visiting student in 1975–76. John Clarke was the first president of the Darwin Students' association during his PhD, and one of the 2025 Nobel laureates in physics.

Conservationists Jane Goodall and Dian Fossey, Brian Gibson, Seamus O'Regan and Sir Ian Wilmut, the leader of the research group that first cloned the sheep Dolly, a mammal from an adult somatic cell, are alumni/ae.

Paul Clement, a former United States Solicitor General, read for an MPhil in Politics and Economics at Darwin in 1988–89. Sir Elliott Belgrave, a Governor-General and High Court Judge of Barbados was an alumnus of the college.

Eyimofe Atake, Senior Advocate of Nigeria, read for a PhD degree in Law from 1984–87

Paul Kalanithi, a Pulitzer Prize nominated neurosurgeon, was an MPhil student at Darwin.

The philosopher Huw Price, Bertrand Russell Professor of Philosophy at Cambridge from 2011-2020, studied for his PhD in philosophy at Darwin. The philosopher Nigel Warburton also studied for his PhD at Darwin. British nutritionist Ann Prentice is also an alumnus of the university.

British architect and founder of van Heyningen and Haward Architects Joanna Van Heyningen is an alumnus of the college.

Alumni who became notable in sport include Helen McFie, a Scottish rower who as a member of the Cambridge University Boat Club won the 1971 and 1972 Boat Races and who competed for Great Britain at the 1975 World Rowing Championships. The Sri Lankan first-class cricketer Gajan Pathmanathan studied at Darwin College in 1982 and played first-class cricket at Cambridge.

Three current or former masters of Cambridge colleges are Darwin alumnae: Mary Fowler (Darwin), Nicola Padfield (Fitzwilliam), and Dame Jean Thomas (St. Catharine's).

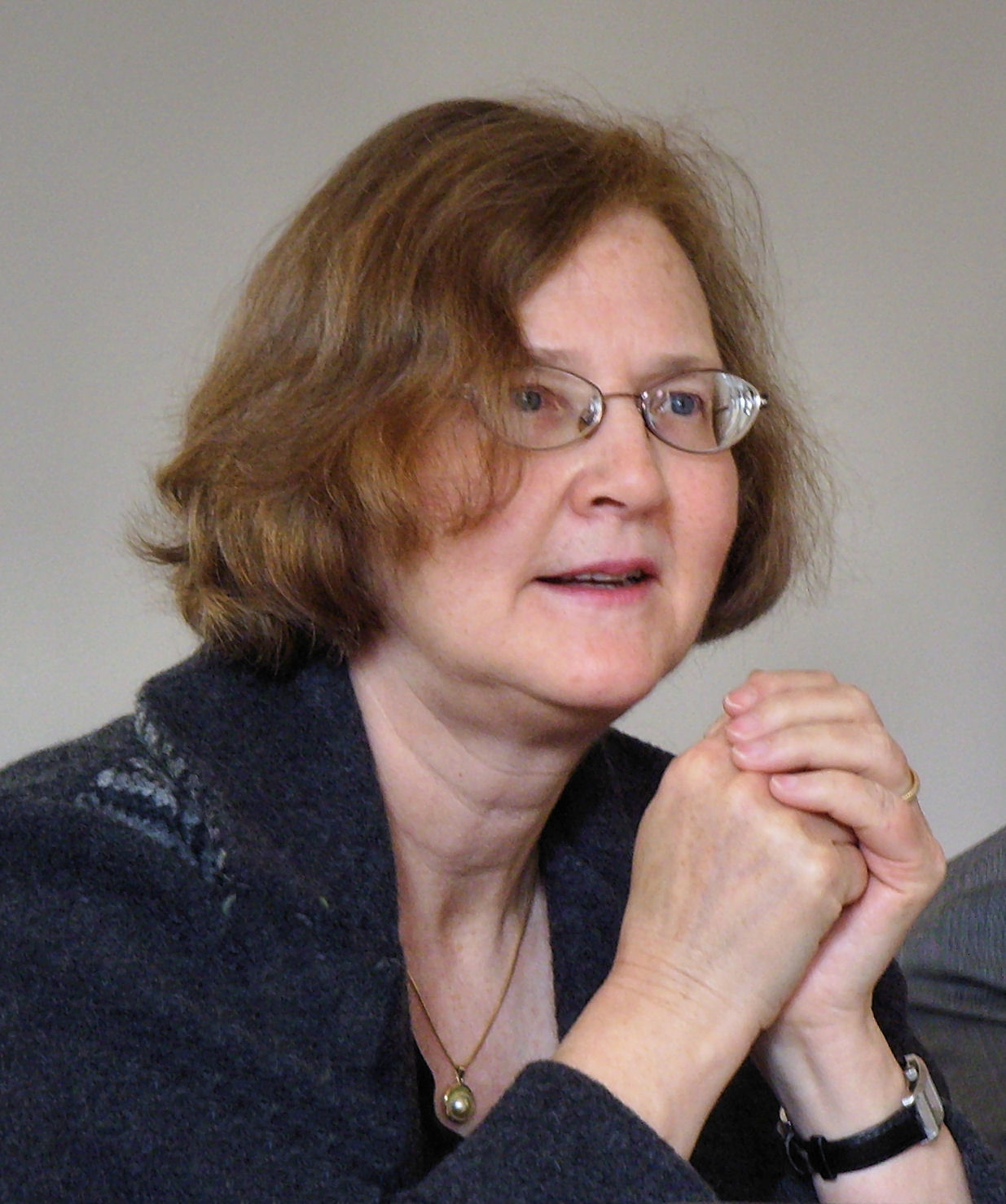
Elizabeth Blackburn: 2009 Nobel laureate in medicine

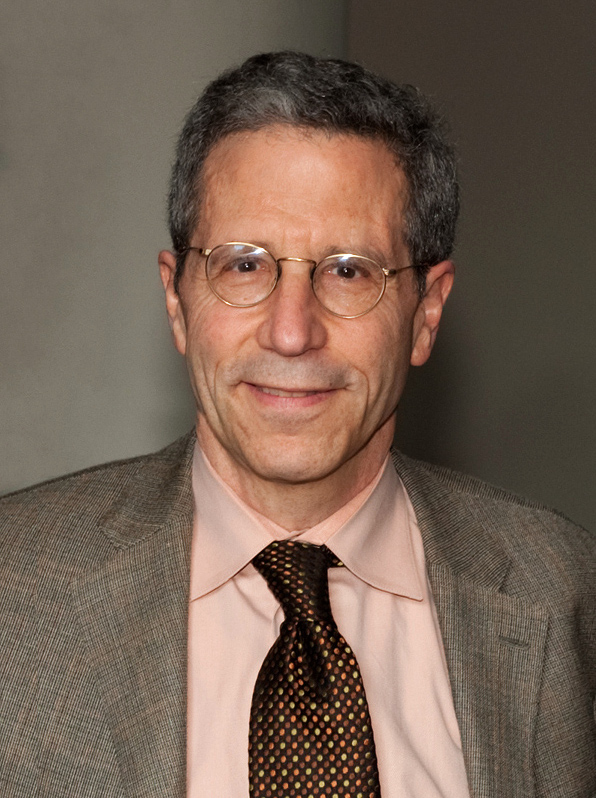
Eric Maskin: 2007 Nobel laureate in economics

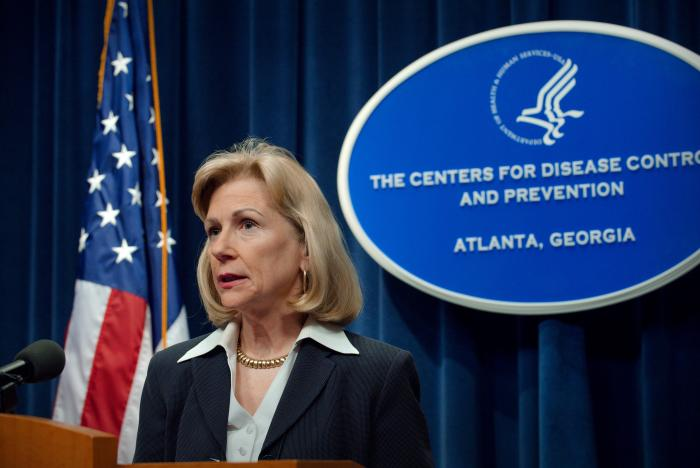
Nancy Cox: Virologist

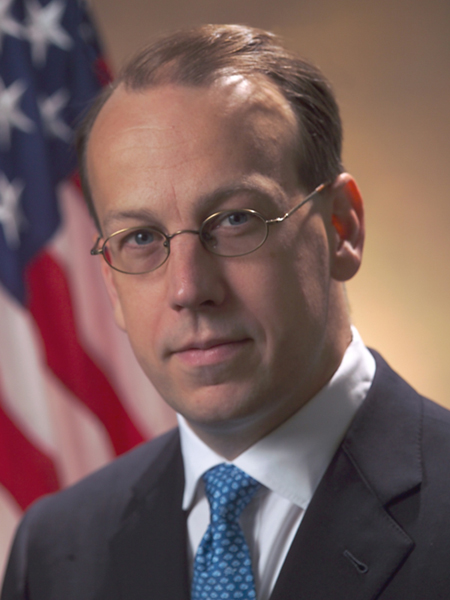
Paul Clement: Former United States Solicitor General

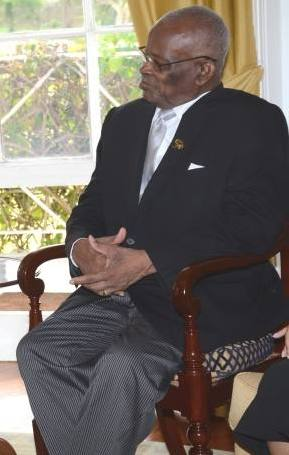
Sir Elliott Belgrave: Governor-General and High Court Judge of Barbados

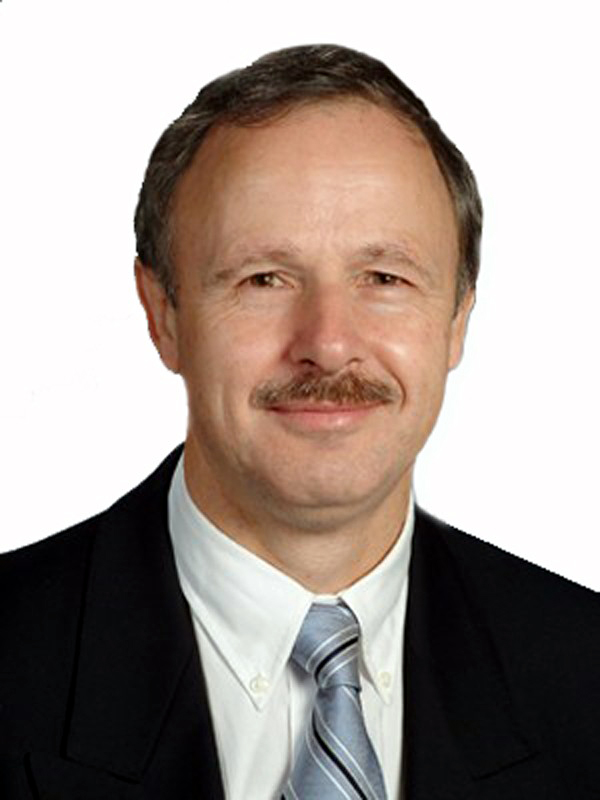
Roger Gosden: Physiologist

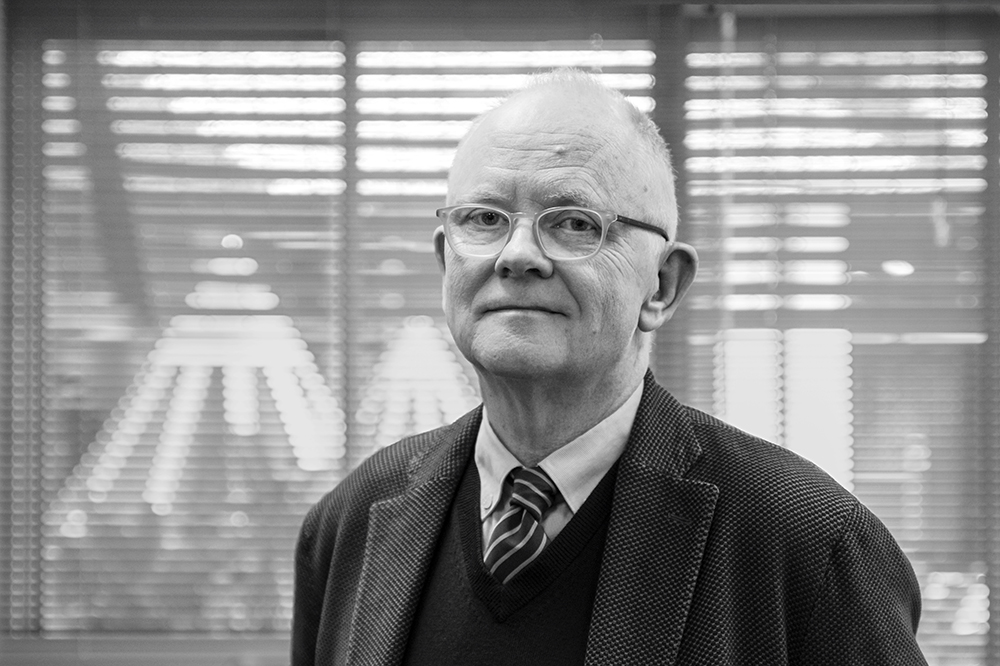
Stephen Gaukroger: Australian historian

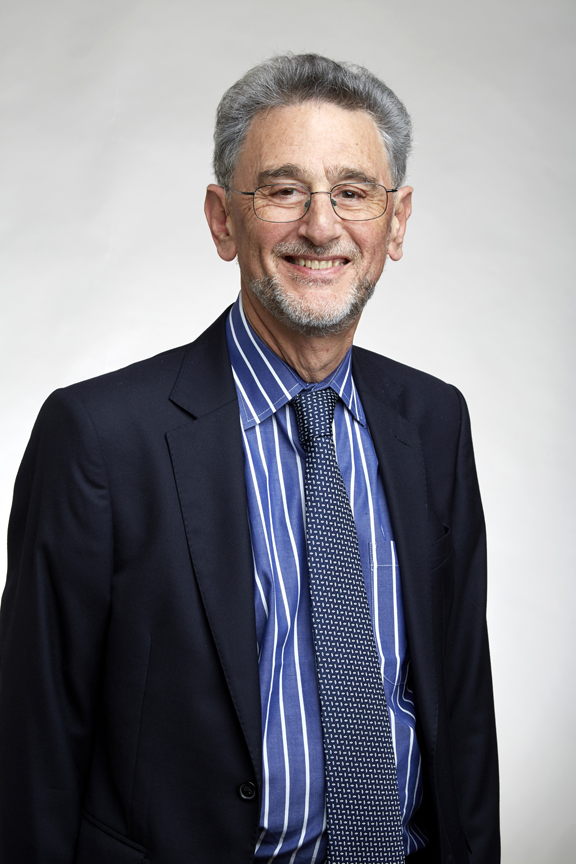
Philip Dawid: Statistician

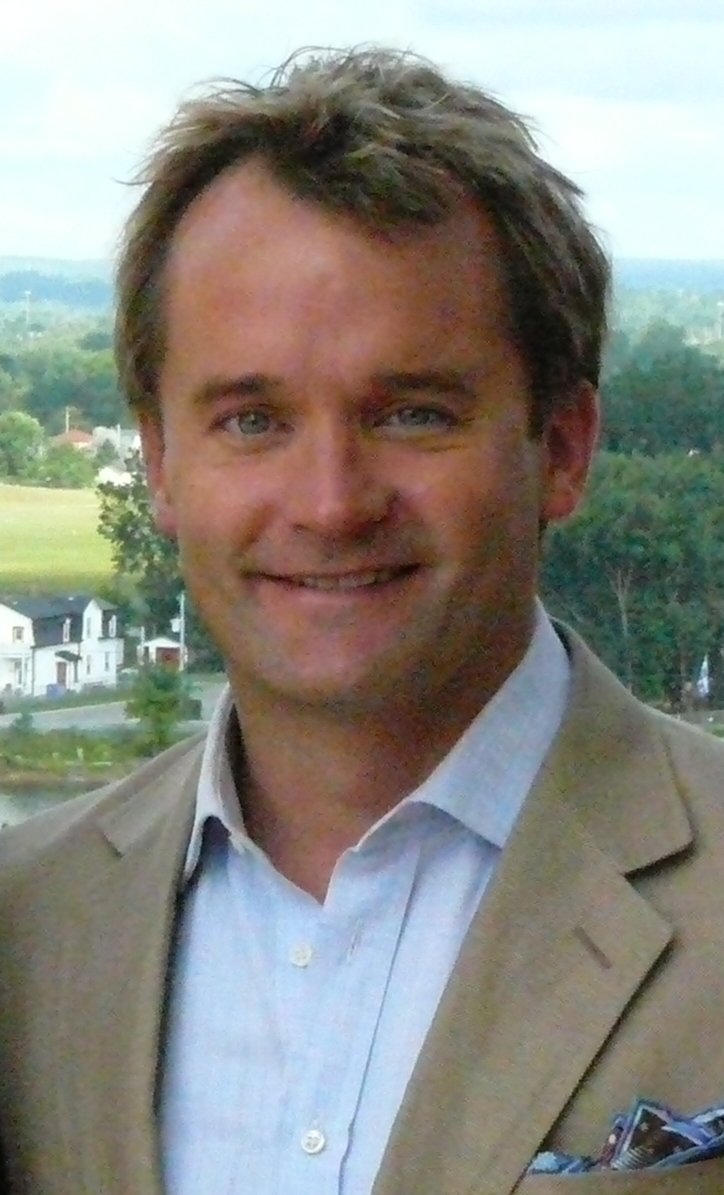
Seamus O'Regan: Canadian cabinet minister and journalist

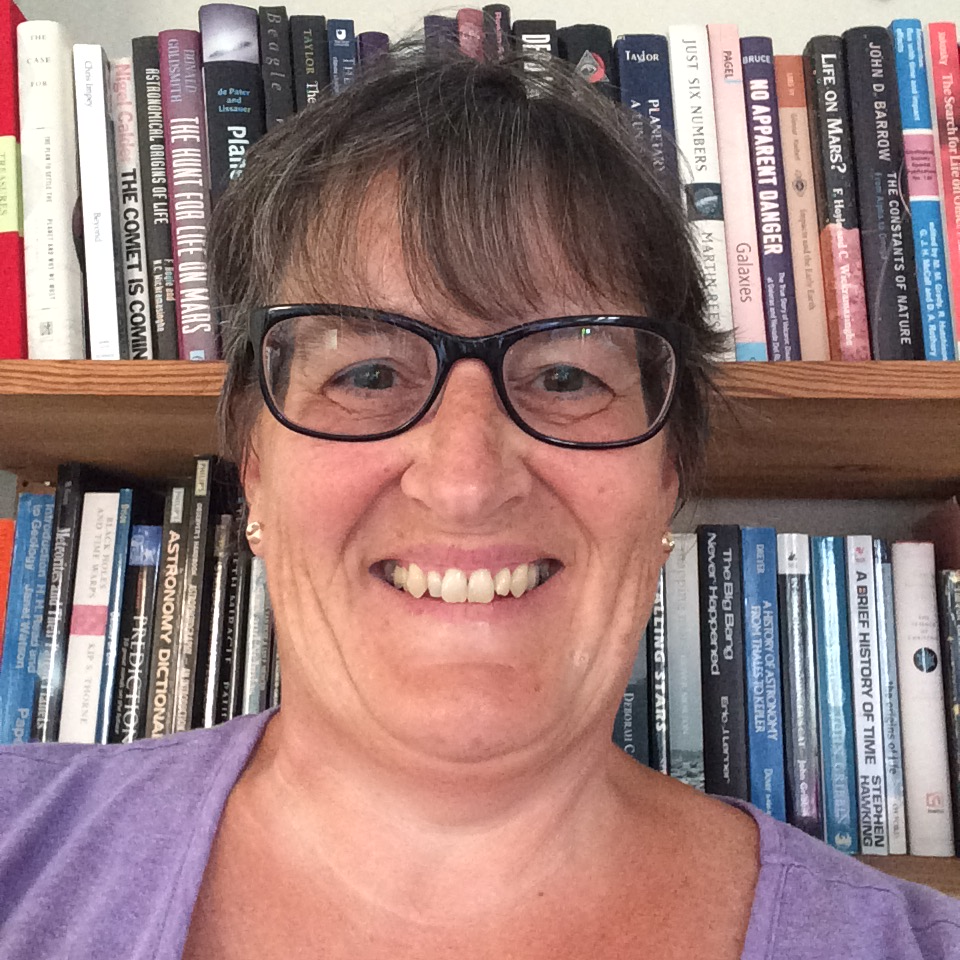
Monica Grady: British space scientist

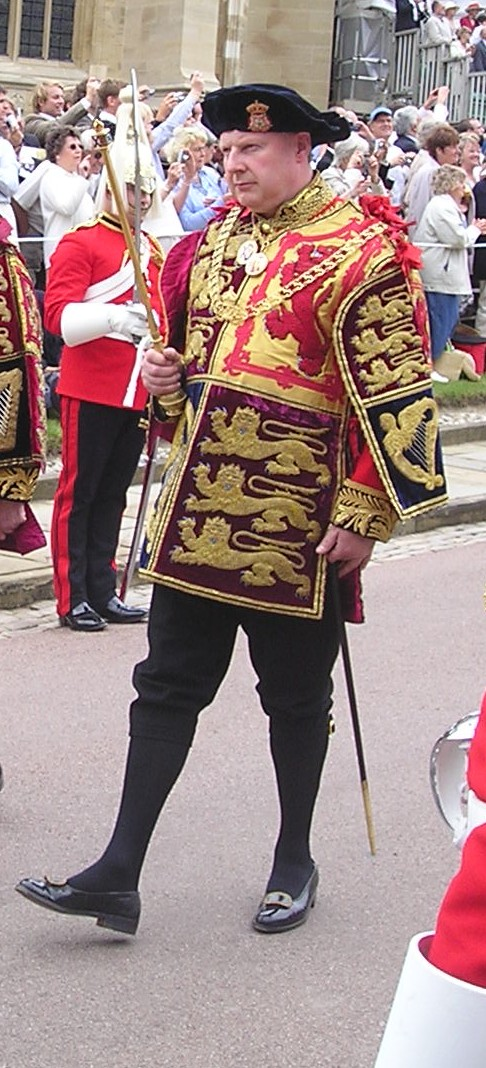
Sir Thomas Woodcock: Garter Principal King of Arms

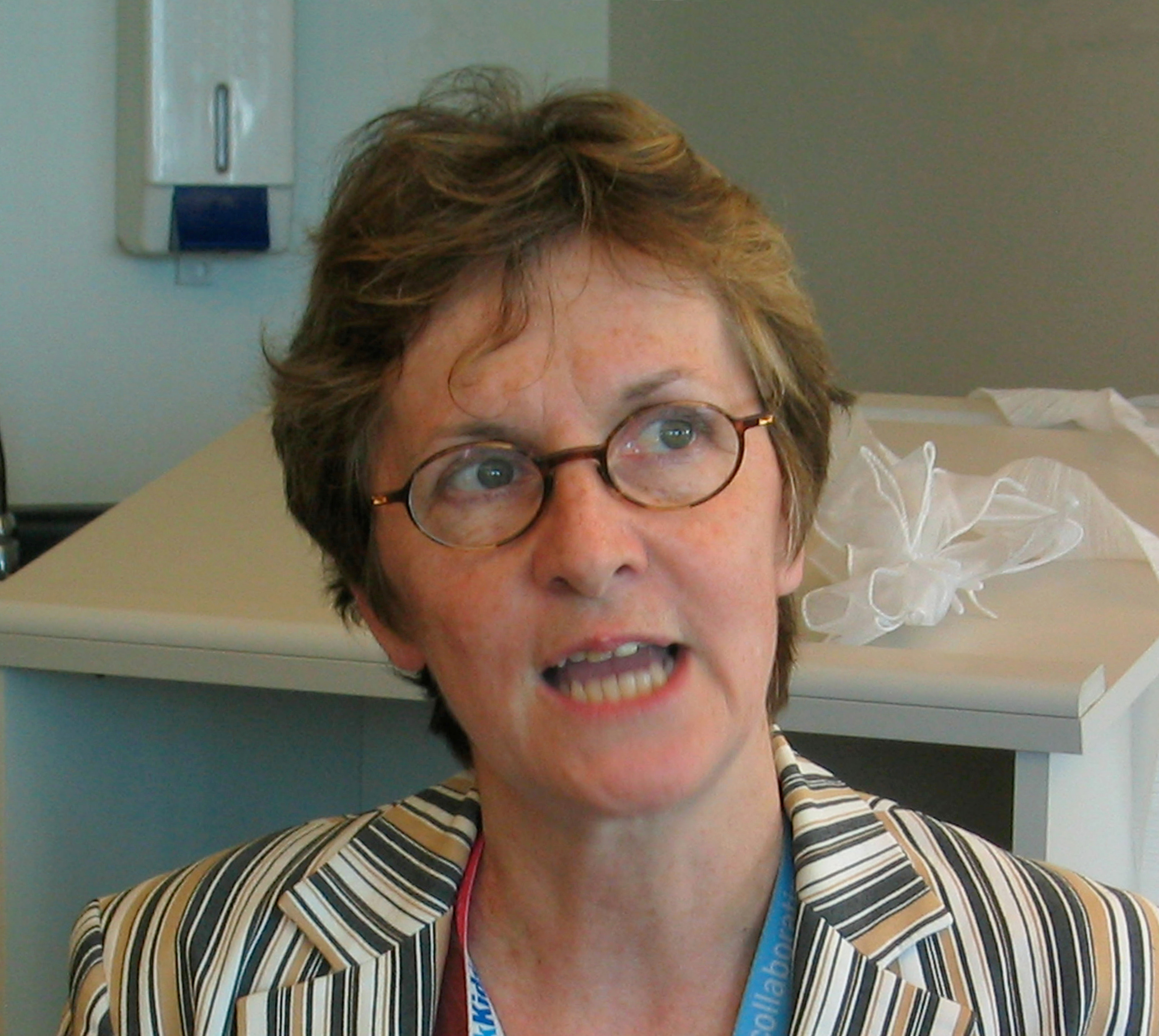
Janet Rossant: British developmental biologist

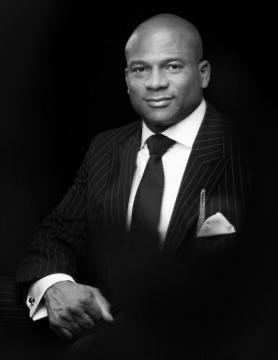
Eyimofe Atake: Senior Advocate of Nigeria, (SAN)

Name	Graduation date	Death	Career
Eyimofe Atake	1987		Senior Advocate of Nigeria (SAN)
Helen McFie	1972		British female rower
Kevin Burgess	1983		British Chemist
Bruce Campbell	1975		Historian
Nikos Christodoulakis	1981		Minister for Economy and Finance of Greece
John Clarke	1968		Physicist
Mary Fowler	1972, 1976		British Geologist and academic
Lindsey Hughes	1987	2007	Historian of Russia
David Ish-Horowicz	1973		Scientist
Paul Kalanithi	2007	2015	Indian-American neurosurgeon
Sir Paul Lambert	1980		Royal Naval Officer
Jane Marriott	1990		British diplomat
John Murton	1973		British diplomat
Nicola Padfield	1977		British barrister and academic
Gajan Pathmanathan	1982	2012	Indian cricketer
Huw Price	1982		Australian philosopher
Barbara Sahakian	1980		Professor of Clinical Neuropsychology
Dale Sanders	1978		Director of the John Innes Centre
Philippa Saunders	2000		British scientist and academic
Joanna Shapland	1981		British criminologist
Lawrence W. Sherman	1980		American criminologist
Sally Shuttleworth	1980		British academic of Victorian literature
Thorsteinn I. Sigfusson	1983	2019	Icelandic physicist
Deborah Swallow	1977		British museum curator
Walter Sweeney	1980		British Conservative politician
Rachel Thomson	1998		Professor of Engineering
Sebastian Ting Chiew Yew	1970		Malaysian politician
Nigel Warburton	1988		British philosopher
Fiona Watson	1989	2003	Scottish political affairs officer
Sir Ian Wilmut	1926		British biologist and embryologist
Sir Thomas Woodcock	1989		Garter Principal King of Arms
Alison Yarrington	1946		Professor of art

== Fellows ==
César Milstein, who received the 1984 Nobel Prize in Physiology or Medicine, was a Fellow of Darwin College from 1980 to 2002. Richard Henderson, winner of the 2017 Nobel Prize in Chemistry, has been a Fellow since 1981.

Sir Karl Popper and the Nobel Prize winner Max Perutz were Honorary Fellows, as are Nobel laureate Amartya Sen and the scientist Martin Rees, Baron Rees of Ludlow. Sir Oliver Letwin was a research Fellow from 1981 to 1982.

Nick Phillips, Baron Phillips of Worth Matravers, the inaugural president of the Supreme Court of the United Kingdom and Tom Bingham, Baron Bingham of Cornhill, Lords of Appeal in Ordinary were visiting professors at Darwin College in 1996 and between 2005 and 2008

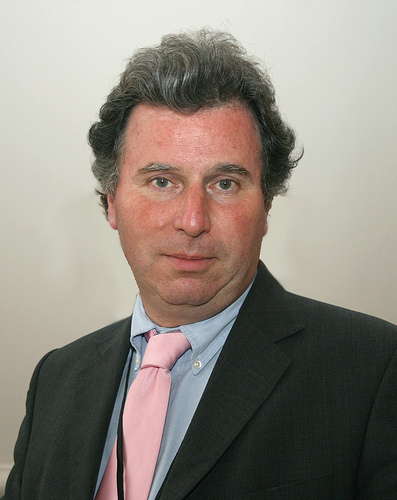
Sir Oliver Letwin: Former Shadow Cabinet Minister

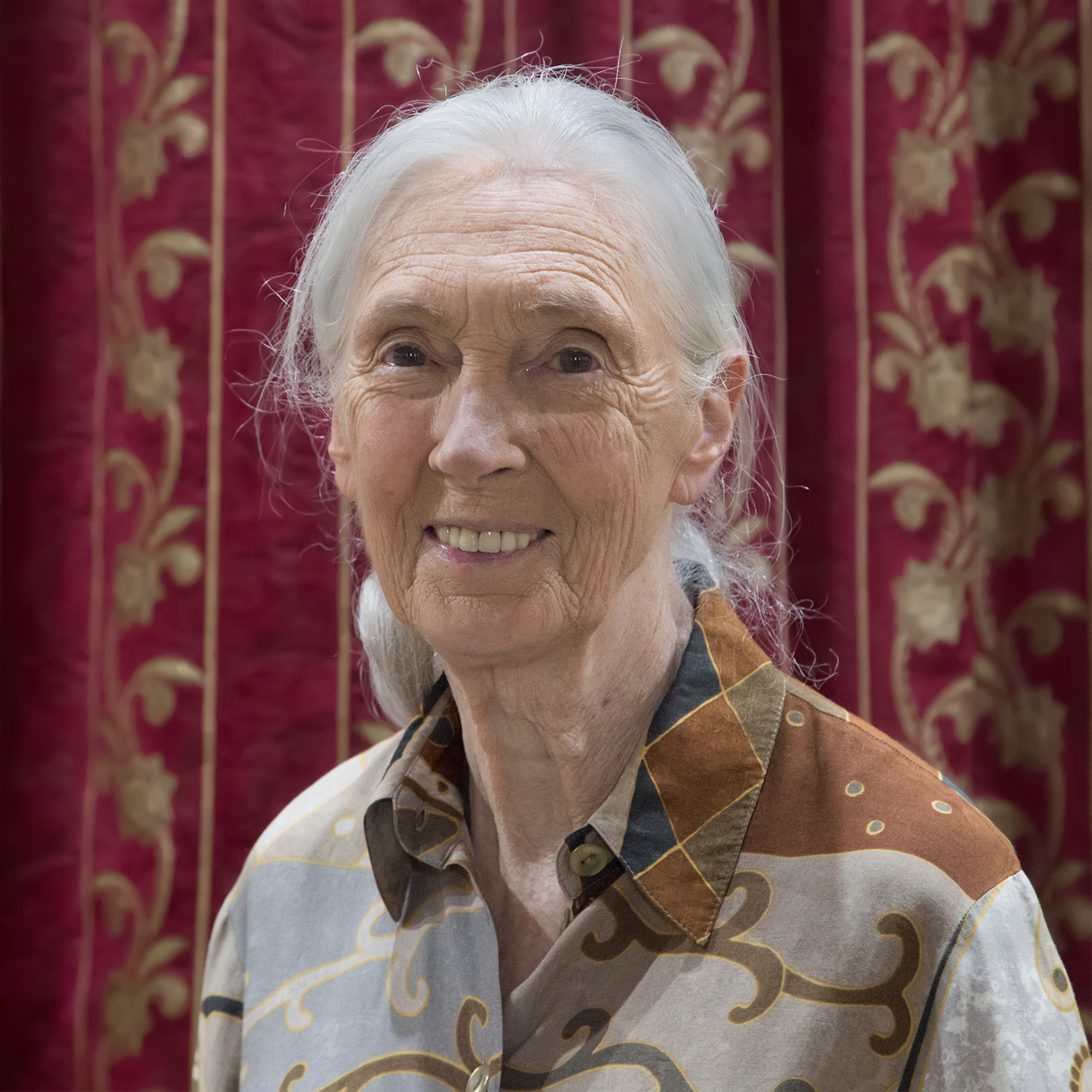
Dame Jane Goodall: Primatologist and Anthropologist

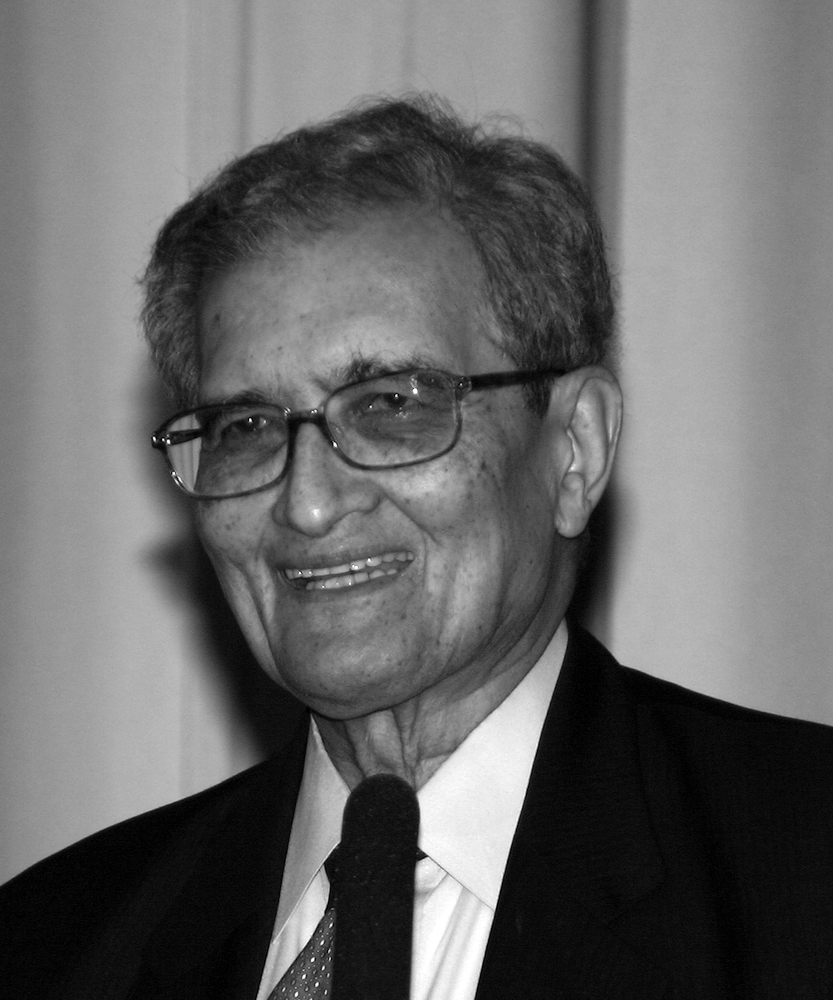
Amartya Sen: 1998 Nobel laureate in economics

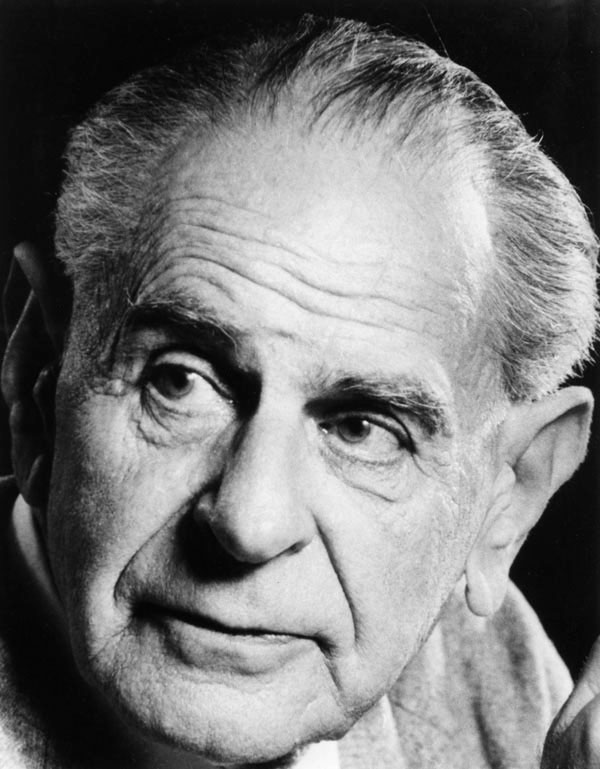
Sir Karl Popper: Philosopher of Science

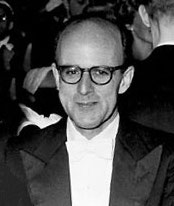
Max Perutz: 1962 Nobel laureate in chemistry

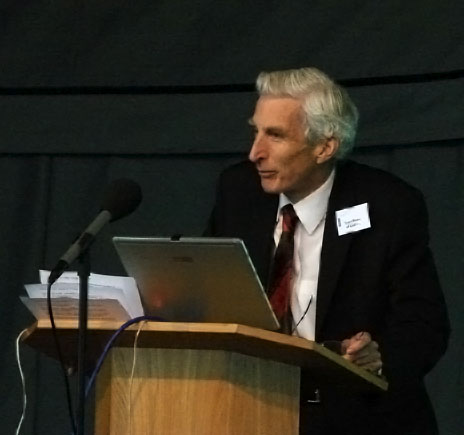
Martin Rees, Baron Rees of Ludlow: Astrophysicist

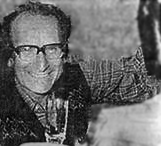
César Milstein: 1984 Nobel laureate in medicine

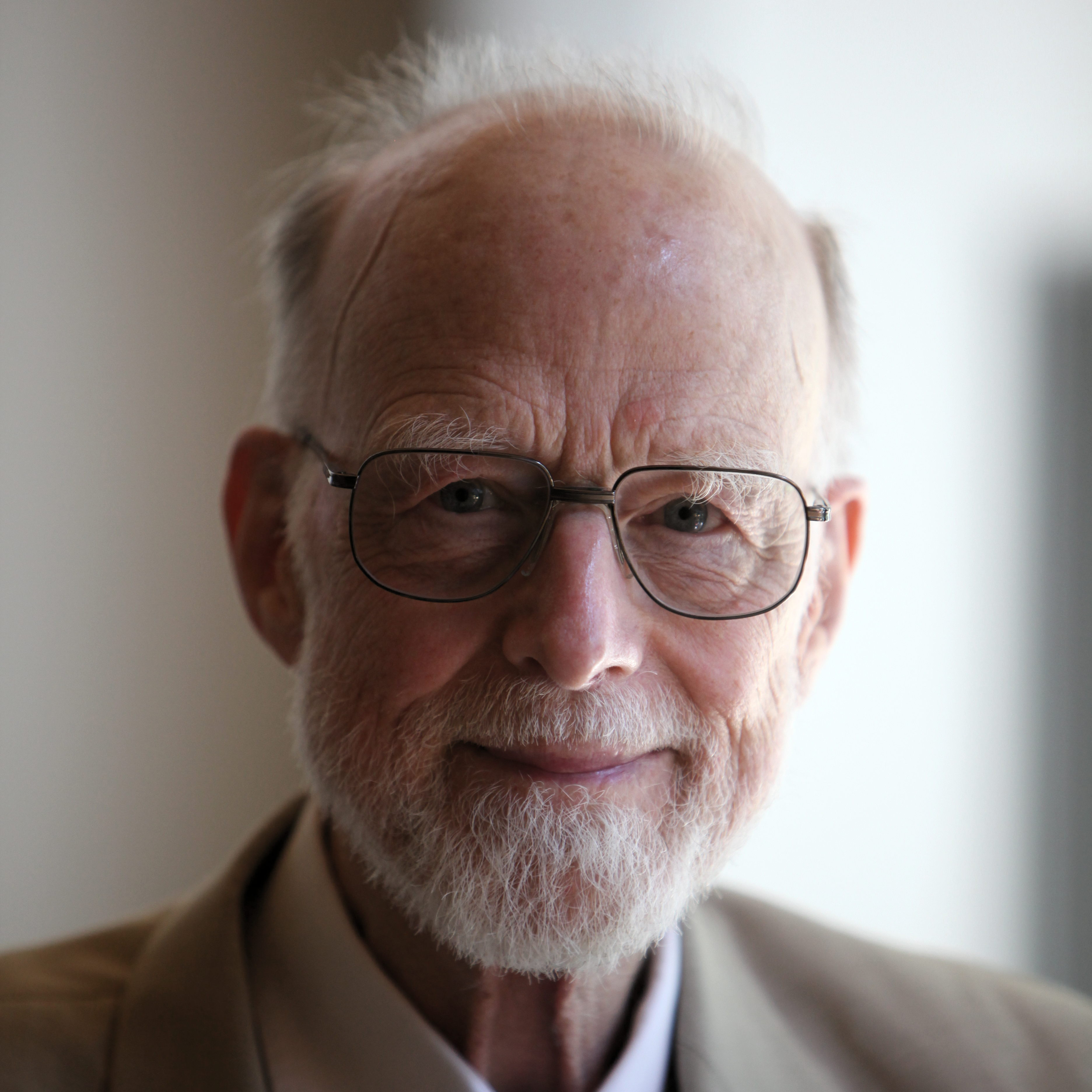
Sir Tony Hoare: Computer scientist

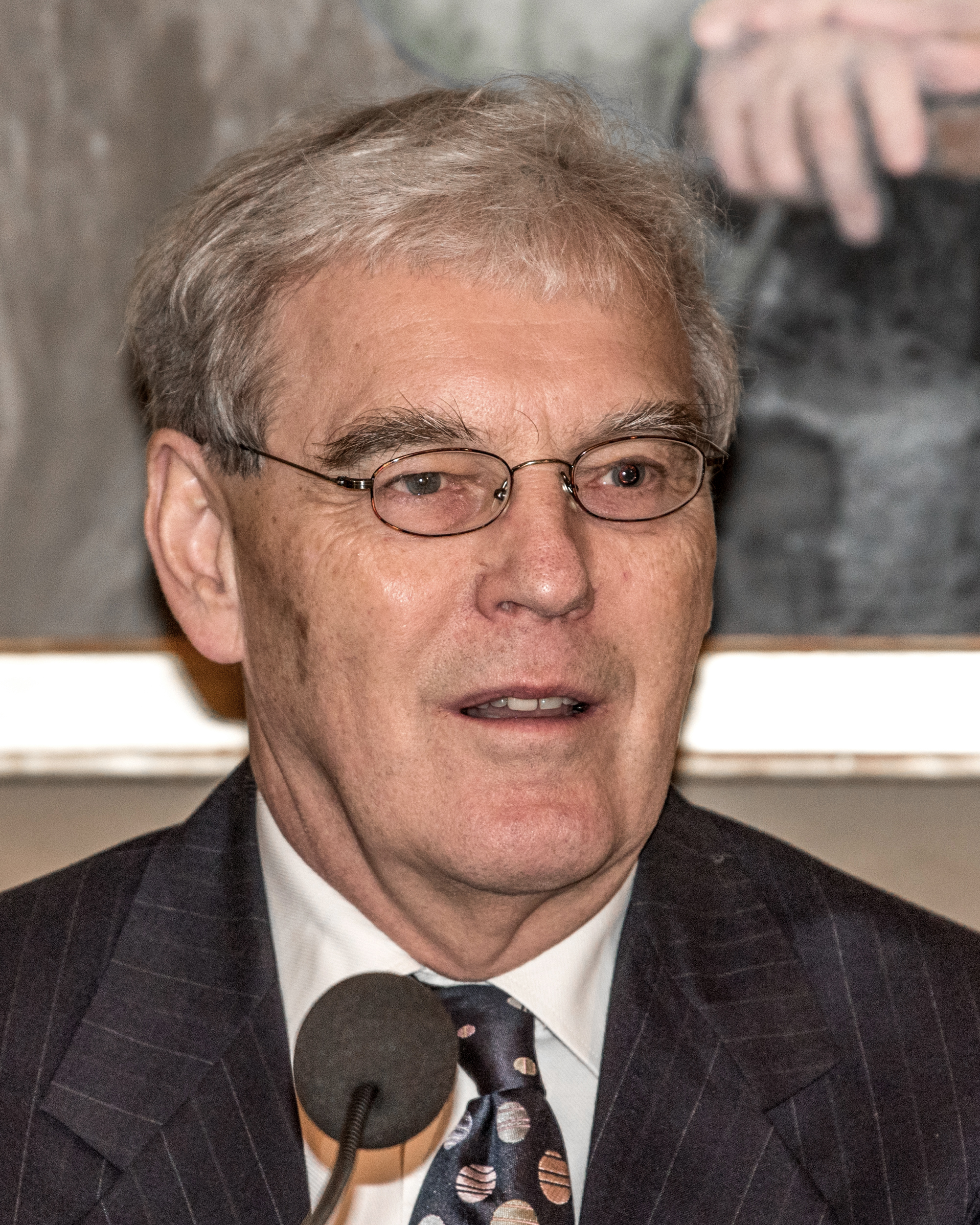
Richard Henderson: 2017 Nobel Prize in Chemistry.

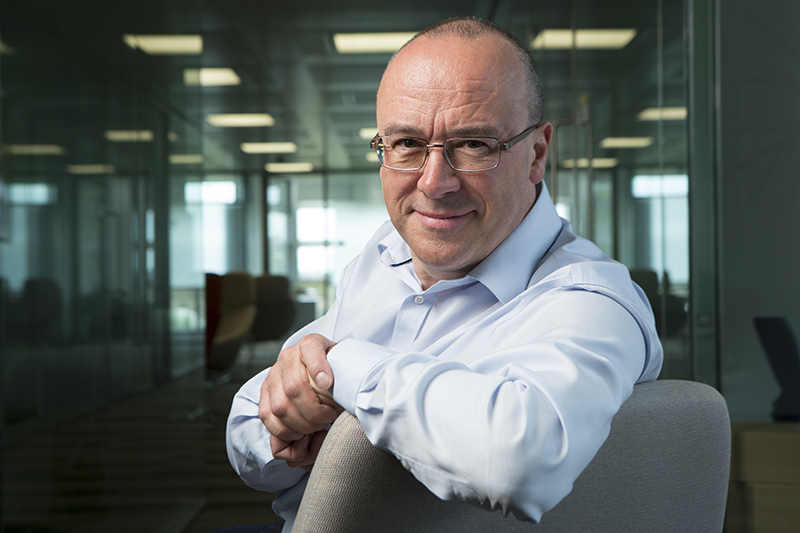
Chris Bishop: Laboratory Director at Microsoft Research Cambridge

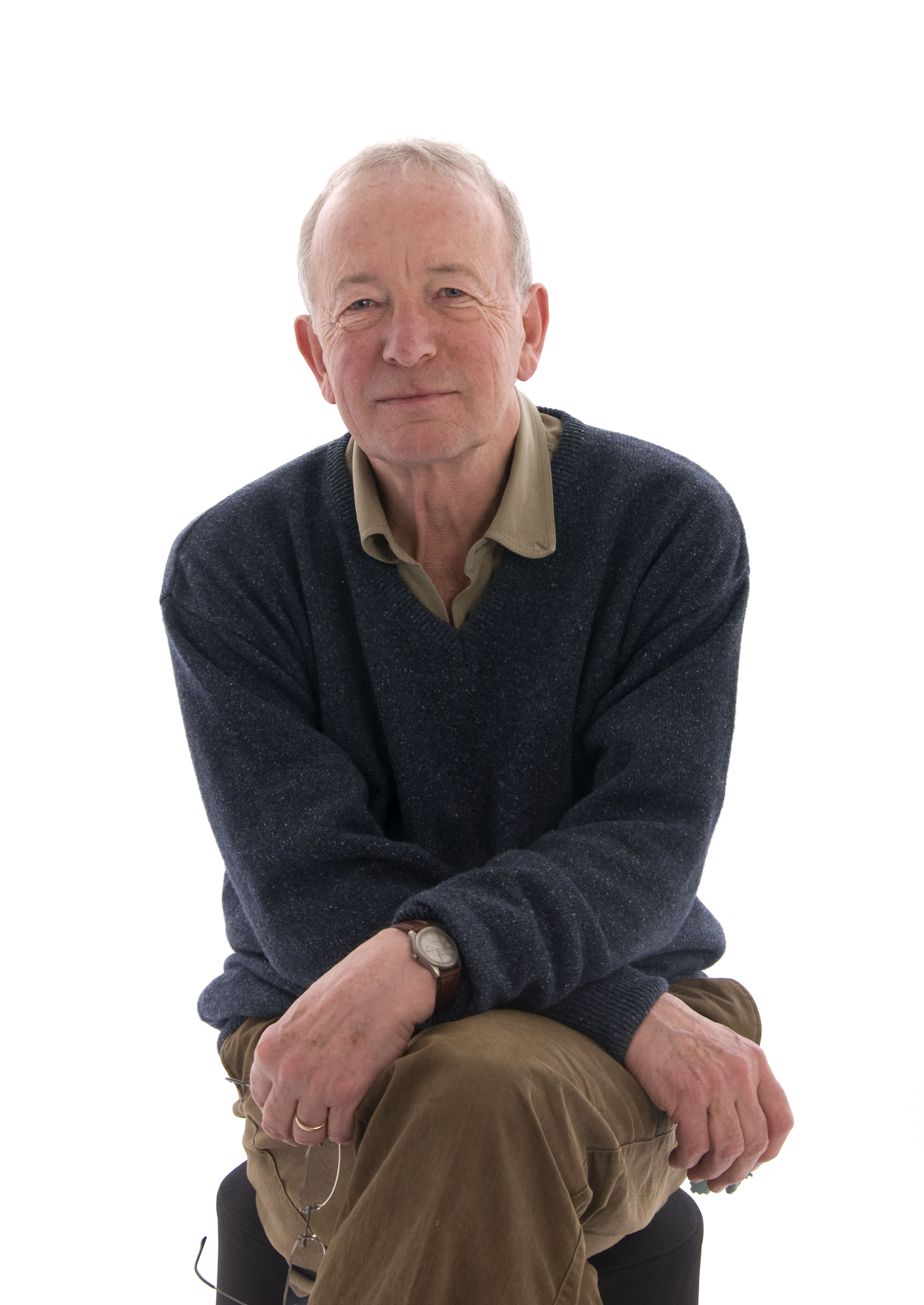
Nick Humphrey: English neuropsychologist

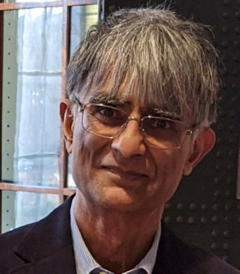
Sir Harshad Bhadeshia: Metallurgist

== See also ==
- Malting House School
- Masters of Darwin College, Cambridge
- Colleges of the University of Cambridge
- List of Honorary Fellows of Darwin College, Cambridge
