= McFie =

McFie is a surname. Notable people with the surname include:

- Hector McFie (1898–1982), Australian politician
- Helen McFie (born 1945), British rower
- Henry McFie (1869–1957), Australian politician

== See also ==
- McFee
