= Thorsteinn I. Sigfusson =

Icelandic physicist (1954–2019)

Thorsteinn I. Sigfusson (Icelandic: Þorsteinn Ingi Sigfússon; 4 June 1954 in Vestmannaeyjar, Iceland – 15 July 2019) was an Icelandic physicist prominent in the field of energy research. He was awarded the Global Energy Prize in 2007, and was the Director of the Innovation Center Iceland at the University of Iceland, where he held the Icelandic Alloys Chair.

== Education and professional work ==
After studying at Hamrahlid College in Reykjavík, Thorsteinn graduated from the University of Copenhagen in 1978 with a degree in Physics. He earned his PhD in 1983 at Darwin College, Cambridge under supervision of Prof Gilbert Lonzarich, FRS.

Thorsteinn worked as a Professor of Physics in The Science Institute at the University of Iceland, and served as Chairman of The Board of Science Institute (1986–90), University Library (1994), The Research Council of Iceland (1996–99), and the Technical Committee of RANNIS. He also acted as Director of The Engineering Institute and Dean of Faculty of the Renewable Energy School in Akureyri. In 2003–07, he was Co-Chair of The International Partnership for the Hydrogen Economy, and in 2006 he created and chaired the Renewable Energy Prize Ceremony, first awarded by the World Renewable Energy Council during its world conference in Florence.

The companies and institutions he founded include:

- Eco Energy Iceland, the holding company behind the ECTOS projects and related renewable energy projects
- Icelandic New Energy, owned by the Icelandic energy sector as well as Daimler, Shell and Hydro, responsible for the introduction of hydrogen energy to Icelandic society
- Varmaraf, a company specializing in thermoelectrics for green electricity production and a novel electrolysis of water
- CRI. A company producing green methanol from geothermal CO_{2} and electrolytic hydrogen
- HBT, A company producing electric filter devices for correcting the electric performance of diesel generators and saving oil for ships
- RES, The Renewable Energy School in Akureyri, where an international masters level education is provided. Prof. Sigfusson co-led the Hydrogen and Fuel Cell faculty

== Awards and decorations ==
- British Council Fellowship, 1979
- Clerk-Maxwell award fellowship 1980 for the development of a new technique in magnetism research
- Elected Research Fellow, Darwin College, 1981
- Knighthood by the President of Iceland, January 1, 2004
- Laureate of the International Global Energy Prize, St. Petersburg, 2007
