= Philippa Saunders =

British physiologist

Philippa Saunders FMedSci
- Citizenship: United Kingdom
- Education: University of Bristol, Darwin College, Cambridge
- Known for: Research into sex hormones; Kidney and liver transplant research
- Awards: FMedSci (2012)
- Scientific career
- Fields: Medicine; Reproductive Steroids
- Workplaces: University of Edinburgh; Academy of Medical Sciences
- Thesis: Studies of Pregnancy-Associated Uterine Proteins in the Pig (1981)
- Website: http://www.ed.ac.uk/inflammation-research/people/principal-investigators/professor-philippa-saunders

Philippa Saunders, FMedSci FRSE is Chair of Reproductive Steroids and Director of Postgraduate Research for the College of Medicine and Veterinary Medicine, University of Edinburgh, and Registrar of the Academy of Medical Sciences. Her research explores the mechanisms behind how sex steroids impact on repair, regeneration and cell replication throughout the body. Saunders is a Fellow of the Royal Society of Edinburgh, a Fellow ad eudeum of the Royal College of Obstetricians and Gynaecologists, and a member of the Academia Europaea.

== Early life and education ==
Philippa Saunders studied as an undergraduate at the University of Bristol, before moving to Darwin College, Cambridge at the University of Cambridge to complete a PhD in researching pregnancy-associated uterine proteins in the pig.

She is Chair of Reproductive Steroids and Director of Postgraduate Research for the College of Medicine and Veterinary Medicine, University of Edinburgh, and Registrar of the Academy of Medical Sciences. She is director of the MRC's Centre for Reproductive Health. Her research explores the mechanisms behind how sex steroids impact on repair, regeneration and cell replication throughout the body. This has relevance to diseases such as endometriosis, where Saunders is interested in developing models to find ways to reduce the pain of the condition.

== Honours and awards ==
Saunders was elected a Fellow of the Academy of Medical Sciences in 2012. In 2019 she was elected a Fellow of the Royal Society of Edinburgh In 2022, she was elected a member of the Academia Europaea. Despite not being a clinician, she was also elected a Fellow ad eudeum of the Royal College of Obstetricians and Gynaecologists (FRCOG) in 2015.
