= John Murton (diplomat) =

British diplomat (born 1972)

John Evan Murton CMG (born 1972) is a former British diplomat, now employed as Senior Sustainability Advisor at Standard Chartered Bank Standard Chartered Bank. In this role he leads Standard Chartered's work on programmatic blended finance.

He was formerly the UK's COP26 Envoy and responsible for coordinating UK diplomacy in relation to COP26. In his Envoy role he led the international negotiations that led to the creation of the South African 'Just Energy Transition Partnership' (JETP) and then served as Chair of the 'International Partners Group' of donors working with the South African Government to implement the deal. In 2022, he led the negotiations on the Vietnamese JETP.

Prior to this, he served in Kinshasa as British Ambassador to the Democratic Republic of the Congo. He was also non-resident British Ambassador to the Republic of Congo and the Central African Republic. He was previously the UK's Permanent Representative to UNEP and UN HABITAT as well as Deputy High Commissioner to Kenya. Between 2010 and 2013 he was head of the FCO's East Asia and Pacific Department and the UK's senior official at the Asia-Europe Meeting (ASEM). Between 2007 and 2010 he was British High Commissioner to Mauritius and non-resident Ambassador to Madagascar and Comoros. He joined the UK Foreign and Commonwealth Office in 1997 and served in London and Tokyo before being seconded to the Office of the Secretary General of NATO in Brussels between 2004 and 2007. He was appointed to his current post in 2019. He is married with five children.

Born in 1972 and educated at Courtmoor and Cowbridge Comprehensive Schools, he read geography at Sidney Sussex College of the University of Cambridge and then took a PhD at Darwin College of the same university. His PhD thesis, 'Coping With More People', studied the social and economic impacts of population growth in Machakos and Kitui Districts in Kenya and won the Audrey Richards Prize for best British African Studies thesis in 1997.

Murton was appointed Companion of the Order of St Michael and St George (CMG) in the 2023 New Year Honours for services to British foreign policy and climate change. In January 2023 he left the Civil Service and took up the position of Senior Sustainability Advisor at Standard Chartered Bank
