= Steggles (surname) =

Steggles is a surname. Notable people with the surname include:

- Kevin Steggles (born 1961), English footballer
- Mary Ann Steggles (born 1949), American art historian

== Origins ==
Steggles is an Anglo-Saxon origin name with two possible sources - both being topographical.

First source comes from pre 7th Century Old English, from the word 'stigol' meaning a steep ascent or from 'stigan' meaning to climb.

The second source is from another Old English word 'stigel', a stile.

Regardless of the source, this name was given to those who lived near these locations. Topographical surnames were some of the earliest created names. Names were originally based on what was seen around the area so those who gave names based their judgement on man-made features and natural habitat.

Today, Steggles has evolved to a modern surname. The modern surnames now are Style(s), Stile(s), Stickel and Stegel(l). There are other genitive forms as well in Steggals, Stiggles, Stickel(l)s and Stickles.
