= Mary Ann Steggles =

Canadian art historian, curator, artist (born 1949)

- Born: 1949 (age 76–77); Norman, Oklahoma
- Known for: art historian, curator, artist

Mary Ann Steggles (born 1949) is a Canadian art historian, curator, and artist. She is the author of books, essays and articles on British colonial monuments as well as twentieth and twenty-first century Canadian ceramics. Steggles is an honorary member of the German Potters Association, Kalkspatz, a Commonwealth Fellow and a Shastri-Indo Canadian Institute Scholar.

== Education and employment ==
Born in Norman, Oklahoma, Steggles graduated from St. Mary's High School in Oklahoma City in 1966. She went to the University of Oklahoma in Norman as well as Oklahoma State University in Stillwater before immigrating to Canada in 1969.

Steggles studied art history at the University of Manitoba receiving her BFA First class honours in 1987. She studied with the authority on Hinduism, Dr. Klaus Klostermaier for her Interdisciplinary MA Degree (1990, University of Manitoba). During her studies with Klostermaier she received a Shastri Indo-Canadian Institute Fellowship to conduct research in India (1988).

Steggles received a Commonwealth Scholarship (1990–92) to study with Dr. Alison Yarrington, an authority on British public monuments at the University of Leicester. She received her Ph.D. in 1993. In 1992, Steggles taught at Bishop's University in Lennoxville, Quebec. From 1993 to 1999 she was Associate Professor of Art in the Faculty of Arts, Acadia University. Besides teaching she also acted as departmental chair for three years.

In 1999, Steggles transferred to the School of Art at the University of Manitoba. She served as Associate Director from 2006 to 2008 and again from 2011 to the present. In 2006 she received the Olive Beatrice Stanton Award for Teaching Excellence.

== Publications ==
Steggles is an international expert on the history of British monuments exported to the Indian subcontinent and Southeast Asia. Steggles was the first to catalogue all of the statues exported to the Indian subcontinent and Southeast Asia in her search to discover what happened to these remnants of colonial rule post-Independence.

Her books include Statues of the Raj (2000), British Sculpture in India: New Views and Old Memories (2011 with Richard Barnes), The Traditional and Religious Arts of Asia (2014 with Cristofre Martin) and MUD, Hands, fire (2015).

Steggles has contributed numerous chapters in publications on colonial monuments including Christopher London's, Architecture in Victorian and Edwardian India (1994), Pauline Rohatgi and Pherozah Godrej's Bombay to Mumbai: Changing Perspectives (2007).

Steggles has authored articles on the political nature of colonial monuments in Marg, History Today, The Sculpture Journal, and The New Zealand Asian Studies Journal. She has contributed entries for The Revised Guinness History of British Sculptors 1660-1851, The Encyclopedia of Sculpture and The Dictionary of National Biography. She continues to lecture internationally on the politics of British colonial statues.

== Wider interests ==
Steggles was a founding member of the Manitoba Crafts Council. She participated as an artist in the Manitoba Arts Council's Artist in the Schools Program from 1977 to 1989. Steggles owned Maple Grove Pottery in Graysville, Manitoba until 1985.

Steggles is also a writer and curator of contemporary Canadian ceramics. Her writing on contemporary Canadian ceramics has appeared in The Studio Potter, Ceramics: Art and Perception, Ceramics: Technical, The Log Book, Ornamentum, Neue Keramik: The International Journal of Ceramics, and Topferblatt.

Steggles has presented talks at international wood firing conferences on the history of Canadian wood firing including NCECA, the First European Woodfiring Conference at Brollin, Germany in 2010 and at the Second European Woodfiring Conference at the International Ceramic Research Centre, Guldargaard, Skaelskor, Denmark in 2014. She was the curator for MUD, Hands, fire. Wheel Thrown. The Legacy of Canadian Studio Pottery for the University of Manitoba's School of Art Gallery in 2015.
