= University Challenge 2020–21 =

Season of television quiz programme

The 50th series of University Challenge began on 13 July 2020 on BBC Two and ended on 5 April 2021. It was won by the University of Warwick for the institution's second title.

== COVID-19 ==
Due to the COVID-19 pandemic, University Challenge took a six-month hiatus from filming episodes. Recording resumed with the highest scoring losers play-offs, with contestants now separated by perspex screens and wearing ear-pieces to allow them to hear their teammates. The show also relaxed the rule that banned students from competing if they completed their degree during the recording of the series.

The University of Manchester and three Oxford colleges – Merton, Balliol and Corpus Christi – all fielded reserves when filming resumed.

There were no debutant institutions in this series, with all institutions having appeared at least once previously. However this was only the second appearance of the Royal Academy of Music, having last been seen back in 1999.

== Results ==
- Winning teams are highlighted in **bold**.
- Teams with green scores (winners) returned in the next round, while those with red scores (losers) were eliminated.
- Teams with orange scores had to win one more match to return in the next round.
- Teams with yellow scores indicate that two further matches had to be played and won (teams that lost their first quarter-final match).
- A score in italics indicates a match decided on a tie-breaker question.

=== First round ===
Team 1	Score		Team 2	Total	Broadcast date
**University of Glasgow**	200	145	University of Exeter	345	13 July 2020
University of Leicester	125	180	**Durham University**	305	20 July 2020
Linacre College, Oxford	140	210	**The Open University**	350	27 July 2020
Imperial College London	155	190	**University of Strathclyde**	345	3 August 2020
University of Reading	50	295	**Birkbeck, University of London**	345	10 August 2020
**Balliol College, Oxford**	150	135	Clare College, Cambridge	285	17 August 2020
University of Bristol	135	175	**Corpus Christi College, Oxford**	310	24 August 2020
Darwin College, Cambridge	90	255	**University of St Andrews**	345	31 August 2020
University of York	100	170	**King's College London**	270	7 September 2020
**Merton College, Oxford**	210	40	Wolfson College, Cambridge	250	14 September 2020
Royal Academy of Music	50	220	**St John's College, Cambridge**	270	21 September 2020
**University of Warwick**	255	105	Wolfson College, Oxford	360	28 September 2020
University of Edinburgh	155	200	**University of Manchester**	355	5 October 2020
**Magdalene College, Cambridge**	170	130	University College, Oxford	300	12 October 2020

==== Highest scoring losers play-offs ====
Team 1	Score		Team 2	Total	Broadcast date
**Imperial College London**	160	155	University of Exeter	315	19 October 2020
Linacre College, Oxford	125	155	**University of Edinburgh**	280	26 October 2020

=== Second round ===
Team 1	Score		Team 2	Total	Broadcast date
**Imperial College London**	180	90	University of St Andrews	270	2 November 2020
University of Manchester	100	135	**University of Strathclyde**	235	9 November 2020
Merton College, Oxford	90	190	**University of Warwick**	280	16 November 2020
University of Edinburgh	145	165	**Durham University**	310	23 November 2020
St John's College, Cambridge	155	200	**Balliol College, Oxford**	355	30 November 2020
University of Glasgow	90	175	**King's College London**	265	7 December 2020
Corpus Christi College, Oxford	115	185	**Magdalene College, Cambridge**	300	14 December 2020
The Open University	95	205	**Birkbeck, University of London**	300	4 January 2021

=== Quarterfinals ===
Team 1	Score		Team 2	Total	Broadcast date
**Magdalene College, Cambridge**	240	140	Birkbeck, University of London	380	11 January 2021
**Balliol College, Oxford**	145	95	King's College London	240	18 January 2021
University of Strathclyde	115	155	**Durham University**	270	25 January 2021
Imperial College London	120	200	**University of Warwick**	320	1 February 2021
Magdalene College, Cambridge	160	200	**University of Warwick**	360	8 February 2021
King's College London	95	265	**Imperial College London**	360	15 February 2021
**Balliol College, Oxford**	175	75	Durham University	250	22 February 2021
Birkbeck, University of London	105	135	**University of Strathclyde**	240	1 March 2021
**Imperial College London**	200	100	Durham University	300	8 March 2021
**Magdalene College, Cambridge**	185	125	University of Strathclyde	310	15 March 2021

=== Semifinals ===
Team 1	Score		Team 2	Total	Broadcast date
Imperial College London	135	160	**University of Warwick**	295	22 March 2021
**Magdalene College, Cambridge**	270	50	Balliol College, Oxford	320	29 March 2021

=== Final ===
Team 1	Score		Team 2	Total	Broadcast date
**University of Warwick**	195	140	Magdalene College, Cambridge	335	5 April 2021

- The trophy and title were awarded to the Warwick team of Richard Pollard, George Braid, Andrew Rout, and Owain Burrell.
- Simon Armitage, Poet Laureate and former Oxford Professor of Poetry, presented the trophy; he had captained a University of Manchester team in the Christmas series in 2016.

== Spin-off: Christmas Special 2020 ==
=== First round ===
Each year, a Christmas special sequence is aired featuring distinguished alumni. Out of 7 first-round winners, the top 4 highest-scoring teams progress to the semi-finals. The teams consist of celebrities who represent their alma maters.

- Winning teams are highlighted in **bold**.
- Teams with green scores (winners) returned in the next round, while those with red scores (losers) were eliminated.
- Teams with grey scores won their match but did not achieve a high enough score to proceed to the next round.
- A score in italics indicates a match decided on a tie-breaker question.

Team 1	Score		Team 2	Total	Broadcast date
Christ's College, Cambridge	50	180	**St John's College, Oxford**	230	21 December 2020
**University of Manchester**	175	30	Queen's University, Belfast	205	22 December 2020
**The Courtauld Institute of Art**	150	100	Goldsmiths, University of London	250	23 December 2020
**University of Nottingham**	145	70	University of Sheffield	215	24 December 2020
University of Central Lancashire	60	170	**Loughborough University**	230	26 December 2020
**Durham University**	90	65	Downing College, Cambridge	155	28 December 2020
**New College, Oxford**	110	60	University of Reading	170	29 December 2020

==== Standings for the winners ====
Rank	Team	Team captain	Score
1	St John's College, Oxford	John Lanchester	180
2	University of Manchester	Ade Edmondson	175
3	Loughborough University	Kate Fox	170
4	The Courtauld Institute of Art	Jacky Klein	150
5	University of Nottingham	Levison Wood	145
6	New College, Oxford	Lucy Cooke	110
7	Durham University	Sarah Keith-Lucas	90

=== Semi-finals ===
Team 1	Score		Team 2	Total	Broadcast date
St John's College, Oxford	135	180	**The Courtauld Institute of Art**	315	30 December 2020
**University of Manchester**	140	70	Loughborough University	210	31 December 2020

=== Final ===
Team 1	Score		Team 2	Total	Broadcast date
**The Courtauld Institute of Art**	150	90	University of Manchester	240	1 January 2021

The winning the Courtauld Institute of Art team of Tim Marlow, Lavinia Greenlaw, Jacky Klein and Jeremy Deller beat the University of Manchester team of David Nott, Juliet Jacques, Ade Edmondson and Justin Edwards.
