= List of honorary fellows of Darwin College, Cambridge =

Honorary fellows of Darwin College

This is a list of Honorary Fellows of Darwin College, Cambridge.

- Sir Michael Atiyah
- Sir Arnold Burgen
- Robin Carrell
- John Clarke
- Sir Alan Fersht
- Sir Tony Hoare
- Sir Andrew Huxley
- Max Perutz
- Milo Keynes
- Stephen Keynes
- Sir Geoffrey Lloyd
- Martin Rees, Baron Rees of Ludlow
- Ekhard Salje
- Amartya Sen
- Dame Jean Thomas
- Sir Gregory Winter
