= University Challenge 2018–19 =

British television quiz programme

Series 48 of University Challenge began on 16 July 2018 on BBC Two.

The University of London Institute in Paris and Darwin College, Cambridge appeared for the first time in this series.

== Results ==
- Winning teams are highlighted in **bold**.
- Teams with green scores (winners) returned in the next round, while those with red scores (losers) were eliminated.
- Teams with orange scores had to win one more match to return in the next round.
- Teams with yellow scores indicate that two further matches had to be played and won (teams that lost their first quarter-final match).
- A score in italics indicates a match decided on a tie-breaker question.

=== First round ===
Team 1	Score		Team 2	Total	Broadcast date
**University of Warwick**	165	150	University of Exeter	315	16 July 2018
Emmanuel College, Cambridge	175	200	**University of Glasgow**	375	23 July 2018
Pembroke College, Oxford	75	230	**Downing College, Cambridge**	305	30 July 2018
School of Oriental and African Studies	90	260	**Darwin College, Cambridge**	350	13 August 2018
**Clare College, Cambridge**	160	150	Hertford College, Oxford	310	20 August 2018
University of Strathclyde	55	360	**Durham University**	415	27 August 2018
University of York	105	240	**St Edmund Hall, Oxford**	345	3 September 2018
**University of Edinburgh**	210	75	Sidney Sussex College, Cambridge	285	10 September 2018
**University of Bristol**	140	110	Queen's University Belfast	250	17 September 2018
University of London Institute in Paris	55	180	**Goldsmiths, University of London**	235	24 September 2018
**St Peter's College, Oxford**	225	50	Pembroke College, Cambridge	275	1 October 2018
**University College London**	180	145	King's College London	325	8 October 2018
University of East London	135	155	**University of Manchester**	290	22 October 2018
**Keble College, Oxford**	180	115	University of East Anglia	295	29 October 2018

==== Highest scoring losers play-offs ====
Team 1	Score		Team 2	Total	Broadcast date
**Emmanuel College, Cambridge**	235	140	King's College London	375	5 November 2018
**Hertford College, Oxford**	215	165	University of Exeter	380	12 November 2018

=== Second round ===
Team 1	Score		Team 2	Total	Broadcast date
St Peter's College, Oxford	120	195	**Emmanuel College, Cambridge**	315	19 November 2018
Hertford College, Oxford	115	185	**University of Manchester**	300	26 November 2018
**University of Edinburgh**	180	160	University College London	340	3 December 2018
Clare College, Cambridge	105	245	**St Edmund Hall, Oxford**	350	10 December 2018
Goldsmiths, University of London	125	135	**University of Glasgow**	260	17 December 2018
**Durham University**	200	100	Keble College, Oxford	300	7 January 2019
Downing College, Cambridge	120	205	**Darwin College, Cambridge**	325	14 January 2019
University of Warwick	125	190	**University of Bristol**	315	21 January 2019

=== Quarter-finals ===
Team 1	Score		Team 2	Total	Broadcast date
University of Glasgow	110	170	**Durham University**	280	28 January 2019
Darwin College, Cambridge	105	115	**University of Bristol**	220	4 February 2019
University of Manchester	130	170	**University of Edinburgh**	300	11 February 2019
Emmanuel College, Cambridge	55	190	**St Edmund Hall, Oxford**	245	18 February 2019
**Durham University**	165	110	University of Edinburgh	275	25 February 2019
University of Glasgow	70	155	**University of Manchester**	225	4 March 2019
University of Bristol	130	150	**St Edmund Hall, Oxford**	280	11 March 2019
**Darwin College, Cambridge**	225	130	Emmanuel College, Cambridge	355	18 March 2019
**University of Edinburgh**	155	120	University of Bristol	275	25 March 2019
University of Manchester	120	195	**Darwin College, Cambridge**	315	1 April 2019

=== Semi-finals ===
Team 1	Score		Team 2	Total	Broadcast date
Durham University	110	180	**University of Edinburgh**	290	8 April 2019
**St Edmund Hall, Oxford**	165	140	Darwin College, Cambridge	305	15 April 2019

=== Final ===
Team 1	Score		Team 2	Total	Broadcast date
**University of Edinburgh**	155	140	St Edmund Hall, Oxford	295	22 April 2019

In what was the most closely contested final University Challenge had seen for the past decade, St Edmund Hall, Oxford had leads of 40 to -5 and 80 to 40 before Edinburgh fought back to take a commanding 125 to 70 lead with around seven minutes left. St Edmund Hall, however, mounted a comeback of their own and took a 5-point lead with under a minute remaining.

However, Robbie Campbell Hewson correctly answered the difficult ensuing starter question, identifying that the first three letters of the birthplace of William Gladstone, Beryl Bainbridge and Wayne Rooney (LIV of Liverpool) equalled 54 when spelt using roman numerals, to give Edinburgh a 5 point lead of their own. Edinburgh then successfully answered two bonus questions and allowed the clock to run down sufficiently to snatch victory.

- The trophy and title were thus awarded to the Edinburgh team of Matt Booth, Marco Malusà, Max Fitz-James, and Robbie Campbell Hewson.
- The Edinburgh team were the only Scottish champions in the Paxman era and the first since 1983.
- The trophy was presented by Sebastian Faulks.

== Spin-off: Christmas Special 2018 ==
=== First round ===
Each year, a Christmas special sequence is aired featuring distinguished alumni. Out of 7 first-round winners, the top 4 highest-scoring teams progress to the semi-finals. The teams consist of celebrities who represent their alma maters.

- Winning teams are highlighted in **bold**.
- Teams with green scores (winners) returned in the next round, while those with red scores (losers) were eliminated.
- Teams with grey scores won their match but did not achieve a high enough score to proceed to the next round.
- A score in italics indicates a match decided on a tie-breaker question.

Team 1			Team 2	Total	Broadcast date
Brasenose College, Oxford	100	150	**University of Bristol**	250	24 December 2018
**University of Westminster**	130	100	University of East Anglia	230	25 December 2018
Pembroke College, Cambridge	85	150	**King's College London**	235	26 December 2018
St Catherine's College, Oxford	130	135	**Peterhouse, Cambridge**	265	27 December 2018
**University of Exeter**	110	85	University of Birmingham	195	28 December 2018
Sheffield University	90	115	**University of Manchester**	205	31 December 2018
University of Edinburgh	120	160	**London School of Economics**	280	1 January 2019

==== Standings for the winners ====
Rank	Team	Team captain	Score
1	London School of Economics	Ekow Eshun	160
2=	University of Bristol	Misha Glenny	150
2=	King's College London	Anita Anand	150
4	Peterhouse, Cambridge	Michael Howard	135
5	University of Westminster	Danny Wallace	130
6	University of Manchester	David Aaronovitch	115
7	University of Exeter	Paul Jackson	110

=== Semi-finals ===
Team 1	Score		Team 2	Total	Broadcast date
**University of Bristol**	205	100	King's College London	305	2 January 2019
**Peterhouse, Cambridge**	215	60	London School of Economics	275	3 January 2019

=== Final ===
Team 1	Score		Team 2	Total	Broadcast date
University of Bristol	125	190	**Peterhouse, Cambridge**	315	4 January 2019

The winning Peterhouse, Cambridge team of Dan Mazer, Mark Horton, Michael Howard, and Michael Axworthy beat the University of Bristol and their team of Philip Ball, Laura Wade, Misha Glenny and Iain Stewart.
