= Alison Yarrington =

British art professor

Alison Willow Yarrington FSA (was born in May 1951), is a professor of history of art at the University of Loughborough and a fellow of the Society of Antiquaries of London. She was formerly Richmond Professor of Fine Art at the University of Glasgow. She is the chairperson of the editorial board of the Sculpture Journal.

== Selected publications ==
- The Lustrous Trade: Material Culture and the History of Sculpture in England and Italy, c.1700-c.1860. Continnuum, 2000. (Editor with Cinzia Maria Sicca) ISBN 9780718502096
- Yarrington, Alison (Winter 2005). "'Solvitur ambulando': Lord Leverhulme, Sculpture, Collecting and Display". Visual Culture in Britain. 6 (2): 99–123.
- Travels and Translations: Anglo-Italian Cultural Transactions Rodopi, 2013. (Edited with Stefano Villani and Julia Kelly) ISBN 9789042037670
- Reflections of Revolution: Images of Romanticism. Routledge, 2016. (Edited with Kelvin Everest) ISBN 9781138190580
