= Visual Culture in Britain =

- Discipline: Art history
- Language: English

Publication details
- History: 2000–present
- Publisher: Taylor & Francis
- Frequency: Triannually

Standard abbreviations
- ISO 4: Vis. Cult. Br.

Indexing
- ISSN: 1471-4787 (print); 1941-8361 (web)

Links
- Journal homepage

Visual Culture in Britain is a triannual peer-reviewed academic journal covering visual culture in Great Britain published by Taylor & Francis. It is abstracted and indexed by the British Humanities Index and the International Index to the Performing Arts.
