= Helen McFie =

British rower

Personal information
- Born: 1945 (age 79–80)

Sport
- Sport: Rowing
- Club: Darwin College; Cambridge University WBC; Vesper BC

Helen McFie (married name Simone; born 1945) is a retired rower who competed for Great Britain.

== Rowing career ==
McFie grew up in Kenya to Scottish parents and started rowing when she attended Darwin College, Cambridge, to study for a master's degree. In 1971 and 1972 she rowed for Cambridge at The Boat Race. She was part of the eight at the 1975 World Rowing Championships in Nottingham, the crew finished 10th overall after a fourth-place finish in the B final.
