= Keep Calm and Carry On =

Motivational poster produced by the British government in 1939

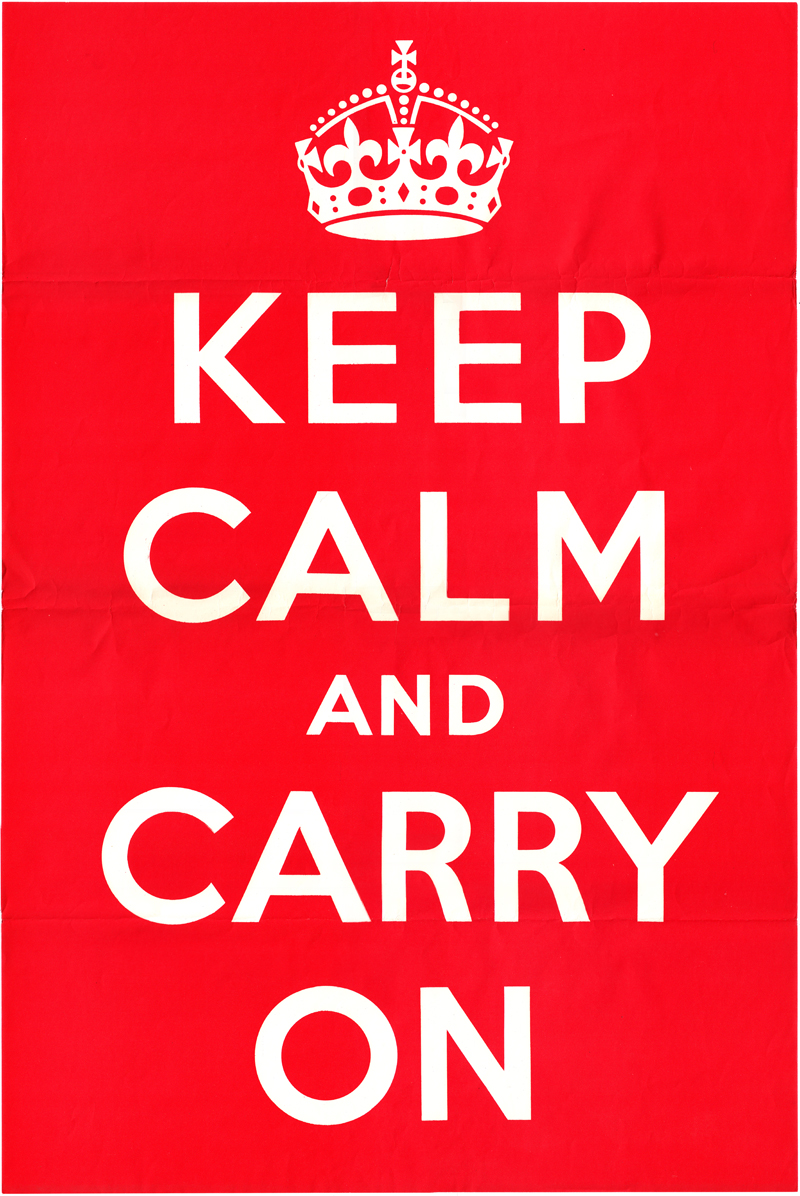
Original 1939 poster

Keep Calm and Carry On was a motivational poster produced by the Government of the United Kingdom in 1939 in preparation for World War II. The poster was intended to raise the morale of the British public, threatened with widely predicted mass air attacks on major cities. Although 2.45 million copies were printed, and the Blitz did in fact take place, the poster was only rarely publicly displayed and was little-known until a copy was rediscovered in 2000 at Barter Books, a bookshop in Alnwick. It has since been re-issued by a number of private companies, and has been used as the decorative theme for a range of products.

Evocative of the Victorian belief in British stoicism — the "stiff upper lip", self-discipline, fortitude, and remaining calm in adversity — the poster has become recognised around the world. It was thought that only two original copies survived until a collection of approximately 15 was brought in to the Antiques Roadshow in 2012 by the daughter of an ex-Royal Observer Corps member. A few further examples have come to light since.

== History ==
=== Design ===
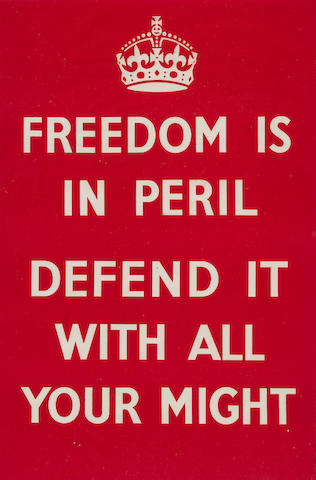
"Freedom Is in Peril" (reconstruction)

"Your Courage" (reconstruction)

During 1938, newspapers were sold with a "Keep Calm and Dig" poster. The Keep Calm and Carry On poster was designed by the Ministry of Information from 27 June to 6 July 1939. It was produced as one of three "Home Publicity" posters (the others read "Your Courage, Your Cheerfulness, Your Resolution Will Bring Us Victory" and "Freedom Is in Peril / Defend It With All Your Might"). Each poster showed the slogan under a representation of a Tudor Crown (a symbol of the state). Keep Calm was intended to be distributed to strengthen morale in the event of a wartime disaster, such as mass bombing of major cities using high explosives and poison gas, which was widely expected within hours of an outbreak of war.

A career civil servant named A. P. Waterfield came up with "Your Courage" as one of several suggestions to be used as "a rallying war-cry that will bring out the best in everyone of us and put us in an offensive mood at once". Others involved in the planning of the early posters included John Hilton, Professor of Industrial Relations at University of Cambridge, responsible overall as Director of Home Publicity; William Surrey Dane, managing director at Odhams Press; Gervas Huxley, former head of publicity for the Empire Marketing Board; William Codling, controller of HMSO; Harold Nicolson, MP; W. G. V. Vaughan, who became Director of the General Production Division (GPD); H. V. Rhodes, who later wrote an occasional paper on setting up a new government department; Ivison Macadam of the Ministry of Information (United Kingdom); "Mr Cruthley"; and "Mr Francis". Ernest Wallcousins was the artist tasked with creating the poster designs.

Detailed planning for the posters had started in April 1939 and the eventual designs were prepared after meetings between officials from the Ministry of Information and HM Treasury on 26 June 1939, and between officials from the Ministry of Information and HMSO on 27 June 1939. Roughs of the poster were completed on 6 July 1939, and the final designs were agreed by the Home Secretary Samuel Hoare, 1st Viscount Templewood on 4 August 1939. Printing began on 23 August 1939, the day that Nazi Germany and the USSR signed the Molotov–Ribbentrop Pact, and the posters were ready to be placed up within 24 hours of the outbreak of war.

The posters were produced in 11 different sizes, ranging from 15 × 10 inches (38 × 25 cm) up to large 48-sheet versions. The background colour was either red or blue. The lettering was probably hand-drawn by Wallcousins: it is similar, but not identical, to humanist sans-serif typefaces such as Gill Sans and Johnston.

=== Production and distribution ===
Almost 2,500,000 copies of Keep Calm and Carry On were printed between 23 August and 3 September 1939 but while Your Courage and Freedom is in peril were both widely distributed, Keep Calm was not sanctioned for immediate public display. It was instead decided that copies should remain in "cold storage" for use after serious air raids (with resources transferred to Your Courage and Freedom is in Peril). Copies of Keep Calm and Carry On were retained until April 1940, but stocks were then pulped as part of the wider Paper Salvage campaign. Some copies do appear to have been displayed, but such instances were rare and unauthorised. An October 1940 edition of the Yorkshire Post reports the poster hung in a shop in Leeds; a photograph discovered in 2016 shows it on the wall of a government laboratory in Bedfordshire; and a large version displayed in a pub appears in a 1941 photograph by Cecil Beaton. An example also features in a drawing of a London Underground station by Floyd MacMillan Davis, published in Life magazine in 1944, suggesting a more widespread distribution.

The posters had been conceived on the assumption that enemy attacks of the civilian population would begin as soon as war was declared, and that there would be a great need for "a copious issue of general reassurance material". In practice, the initial poster campaign coincided with the Phoney War, and thus to a population as yet completely unaffected by direct encounter with the enemy.

The remainder of the poster campaign was cancelled in October 1939 following criticism of its cost and impact. Mass-Observation analysis of the public response to the campaign was overwhelmingly negative. Criticisms of the posters included Your Courage as being too long, confusingly worded, and generally annoying due to the sheer number of posters. In particular some had interpreted the message of Your Courage to imply that the common people would suffer for the benefit of the upper classes. Design historian Susannah Walker regards the campaign as "a resounding failure" and reflective of a misjudgement by upper-class civil servants of the mood of the people. Stuart Manley suggests that the negative reaction to the first two posters resulted in Keep Calm being held back, and that this was an error of judgement: "If they had started with this one, I think it would have been just as popular then as it is now.

=== Later developments ===
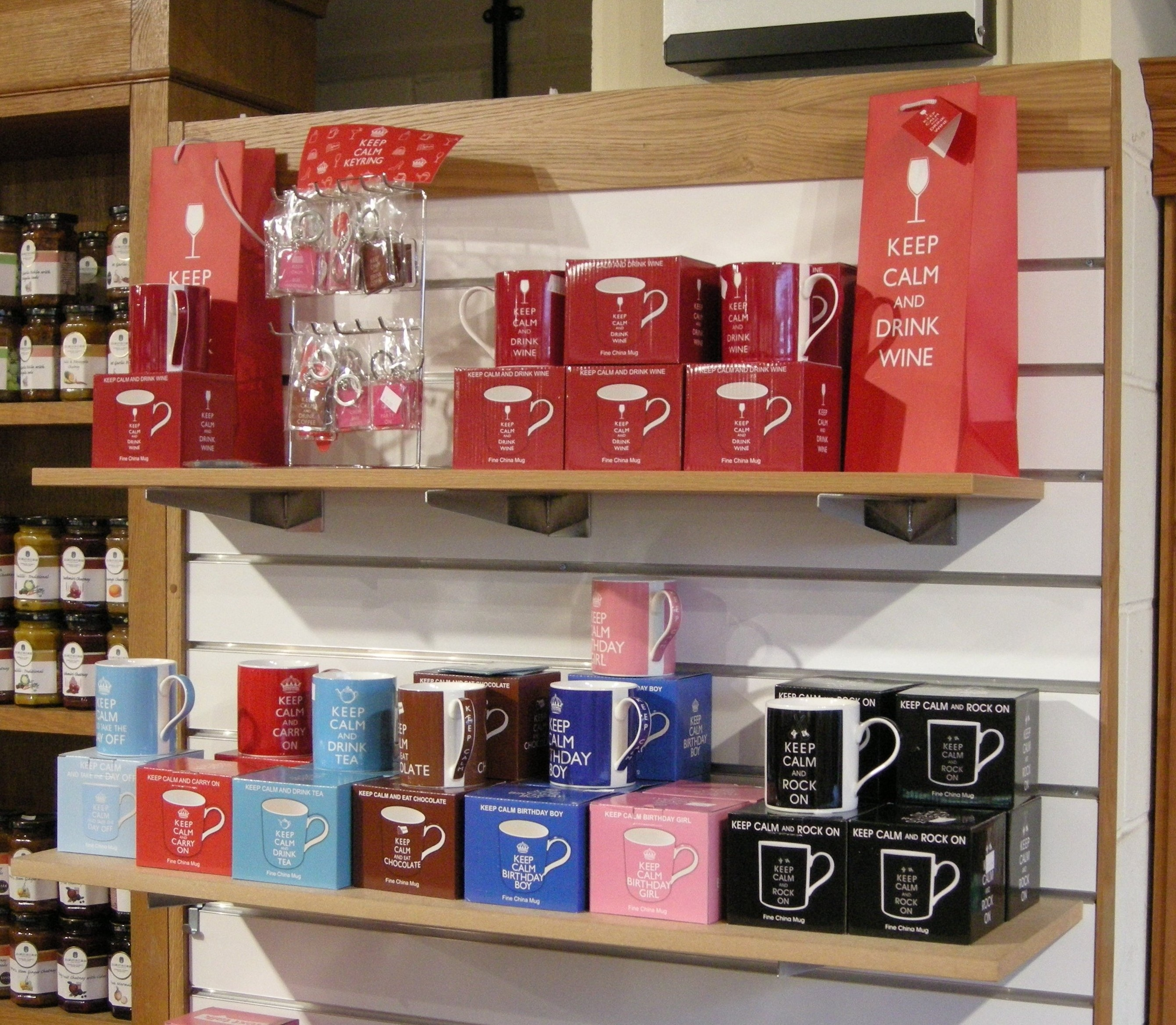
"Keep Calm" merchandise, including the original slogan and variants such as "Keep Calm and Drink Tea", 2013

In late May and early June 1941, 14,000,000 copies of a leaflet entitled "Beating the Invader" were distributed with a message from Prime Minister Winston Churchill. The leaflet begins "If invasion comes..." and exhorts the populace to "Stand Firm" and "Carry On". The two phrases do not appear in one sentence, as they applied to different segments of the population depending on their circumstances, with those civilians finding themselves in areas of fighting ordered to stand firm (i.e., stay put) and those not in areas of fighting ordered to carry on (i.e., continue vital war work). Each mandate is identified as a "great order and duty" should invasion come. The leaflet then lists 14 questions and answers on practical measures to be taken.

=== Rediscovery and commercialisation ===
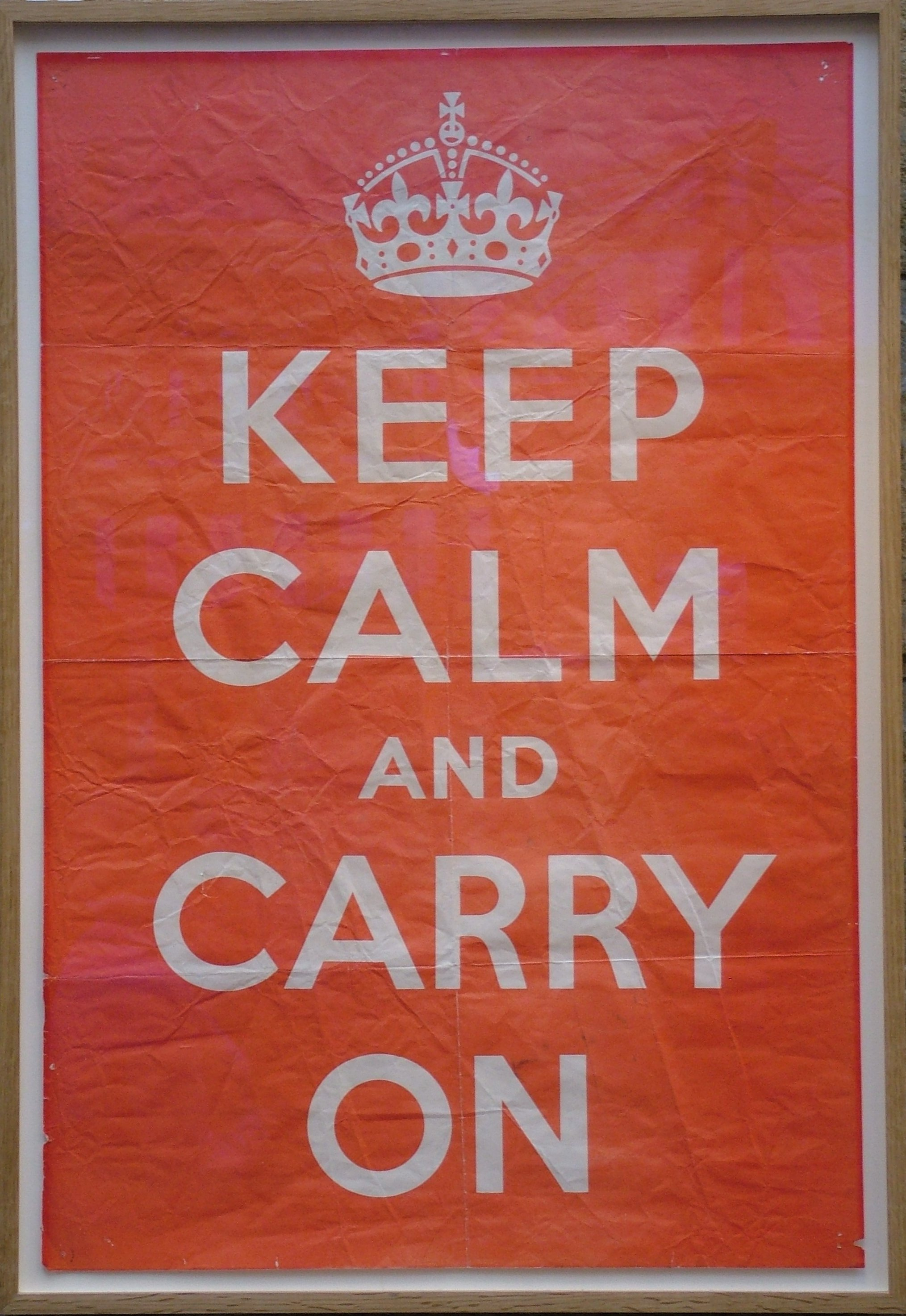
An original poster displayed at Barter Books

In 2000, Stuart Manley, co-owner with his wife Mary of Barter Books Ltd. in Alnwick, Northumberland, was sorting through a box of second-hand books bought at auction when he uncovered one of the original "Keep Calm and Carry On" posters. The couple framed it and hung it up by the cash register; it attracted so much interest that Manley began to produce and sell copies. In late 2005, Guardian journalist Susie Steiner featured the replica posters as a Christmas gift suggestion, raising their profile still further. Other companies followed the Manleys' example, and the design rapidly began to be used as the theme for a wide range of products. Mary Manley later commented, "I didn't want it trivialised; but of course now it's been trivialised beyond belief."

In early 2012, Barter Books debuted an informational short film, The Story of Keep Calm and Carry On, providing visual insight into the modernisation and commercialisation of the design and the phrase.

The poster has become an evocation of British stoicism: the "stiff upper lip", self-discipline, fortitude and remaining calm in adversity. Susannah Walker comments that it is now seen "not only as a distillation of a crucial moment in Britishness, but also as an inspiring message from the past to the present in a time of crisis". She goes on to point out, however, that such an interpretation overlooks the circumstances of its production, and the relative failure of the campaign of which it formed a part.

More recently, Canadian TV comedy-drama series Being Erica (2009–2011) had a Keep Calm poster very visibly on Erica Strange's bathroom wall. During Barack Obama's presidential electoral campaign, a poster playing humorously on "carry" was on a campaign office wall.

=== Trademark claims ===
In August 2011, it was reported that a UK-based company called Keep Calm and Carry On Ltd (managed by entrepreneur Mark Coop) had registered the slogan as a community trade mark in the EU, CTM No: 009455619, and in the United States, No. 4066622, after failing to obtain its registration as a trademark in the United Kingdom. The company issued a take-down request against a seller of Keep Calm and Carry On products. The company's right to claim the trademark was questioned by, among others, the Manleys of Barter Books, as the slogan had been widely used before registration and was not recognisable as indicating trade origin.

An application was submitted by British intellectual property advisor and UK trademarking service Trade Mark Direct to cancel the registration on the grounds that the words were too widely used for one person to own the exclusive rights, but the request for cancellation was rejected and the trade mark was still protected in all EU countries. The company subsequently tried to register the slogan as its trademark in both the United States and Canada.

The company's EU trademark expired on 18 October 2020, and its US trademark was cancelled on 13 July 2018. The company still operates a storefront in which they provide worldwide shipping of Keep Calm and Carry On branded clothing and other accessories. They describe themselves as "The only official and licensed store".

== Imitations ==
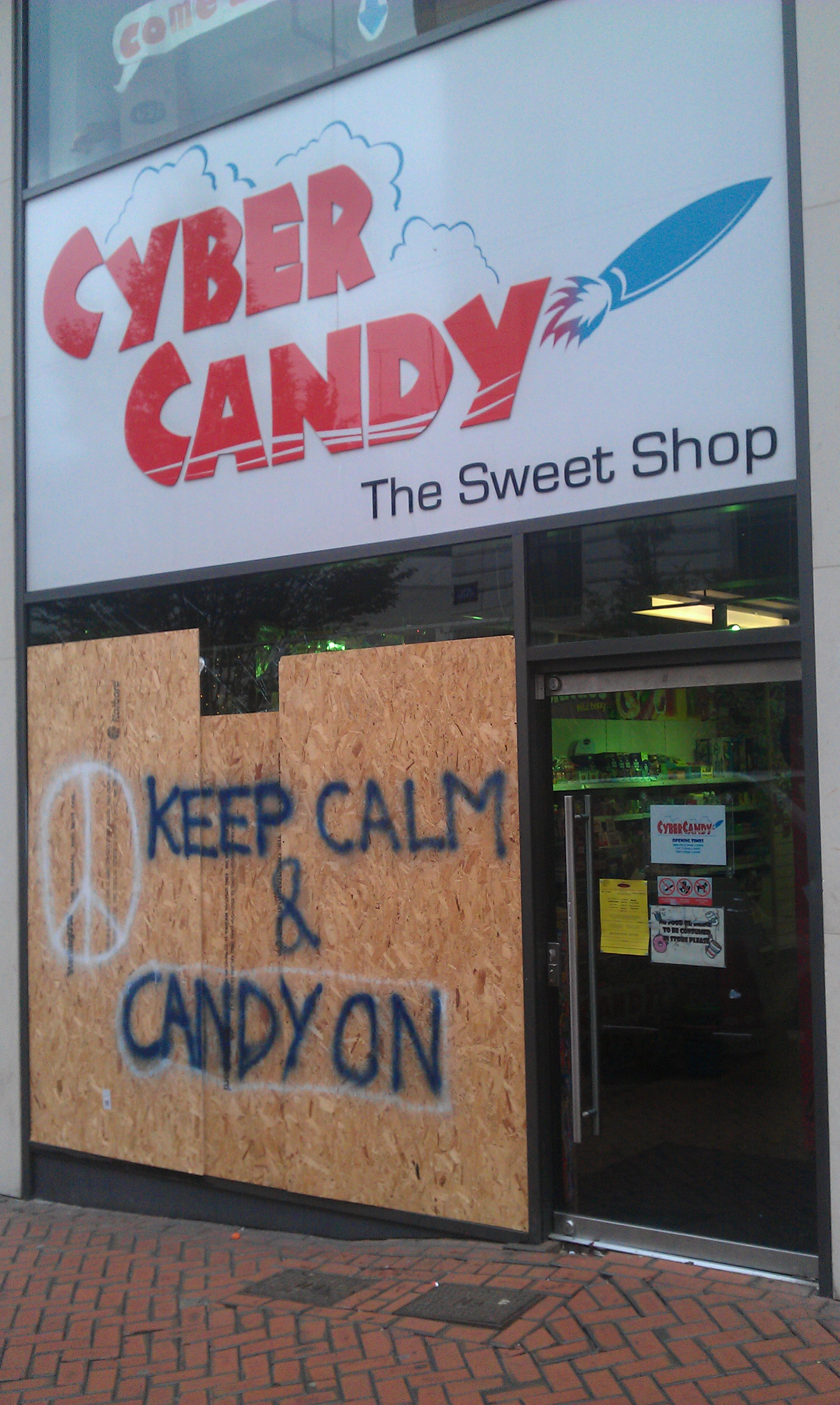
"Keep Calm and Candy On" painted on boards covering smashed windows of a sweet shop in Birmingham during the 2011 England riots

As the popularity of the poster in various media has grown, innumerable parodies, imitations and co-optations have also appeared, making it a notable meme. Messages range from the cute to the overtly political. Examples have included "Now Panic and Freak Out" (with an upside-down crown), "Get Excited and Make Things" (with a crown incorporating spanners), "Keep Calm and Have a Cupcake" (with a cupcake icon), "Don't Panic and Fake a British Accent", "Keep Spending and Carry On Shopping", "Keep Calm and Don't Sneeze" during the 2009 swine flu pandemic, "Keep Calm and Call Batman" (with the Batman logo), "Keep Calm and Switch to Linux" (with Tux),, "Keep Calm and Hail Megatron" from Transformers: The Last Knight, and "Keep Calm and Wash Your Hands". The phrase has been modified in many ways, as noted in the title of a book chapter '"Keep Calm and Carry On" – From Wartime Slogan to One of the Most Frequently Modified Proverbs' by Sabine Fiedler.

In March–April 2012, the British pop-rock band McFly undertook a theatre tour titled "The Keep Calm and Play Louder Tour", promoted with a poster closely based on that of 1939. In late 2012 and early 2013, the "Save Lewisham Hospital" campaign (a protest against proposed cuts in services at University Hospital Lewisham) made widespread use of a poster with the slogan "Don't Keep Calm Get Angry and Save Lewisham A&E". The efforts of Naheed Nenshi, mayor of Calgary, Alberta, Canada, to encourage and motivate his citizens in the wake of the 2013 Alberta floods made him the subject of parody "Keep Calm and Nenshi On" fundraising T-shirts.

== Gallery ==
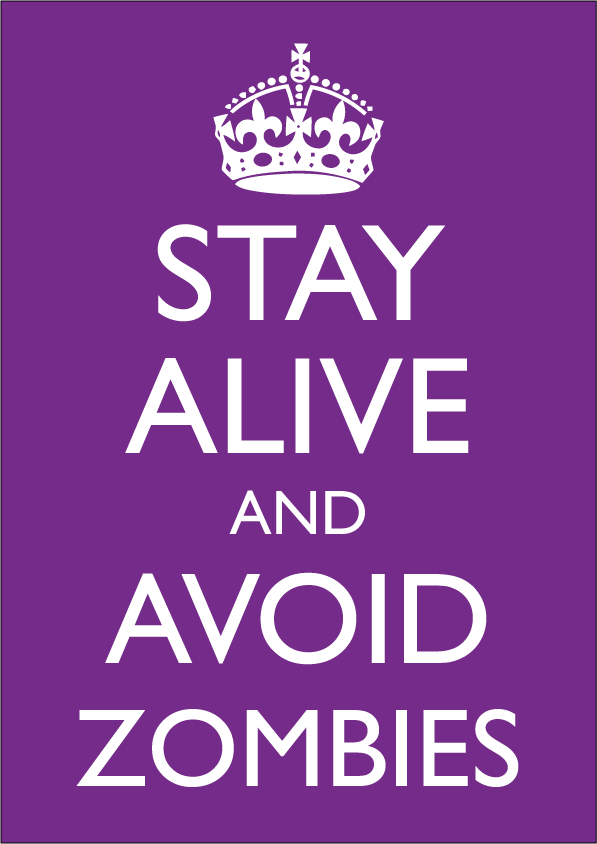
Poster parody, 2009

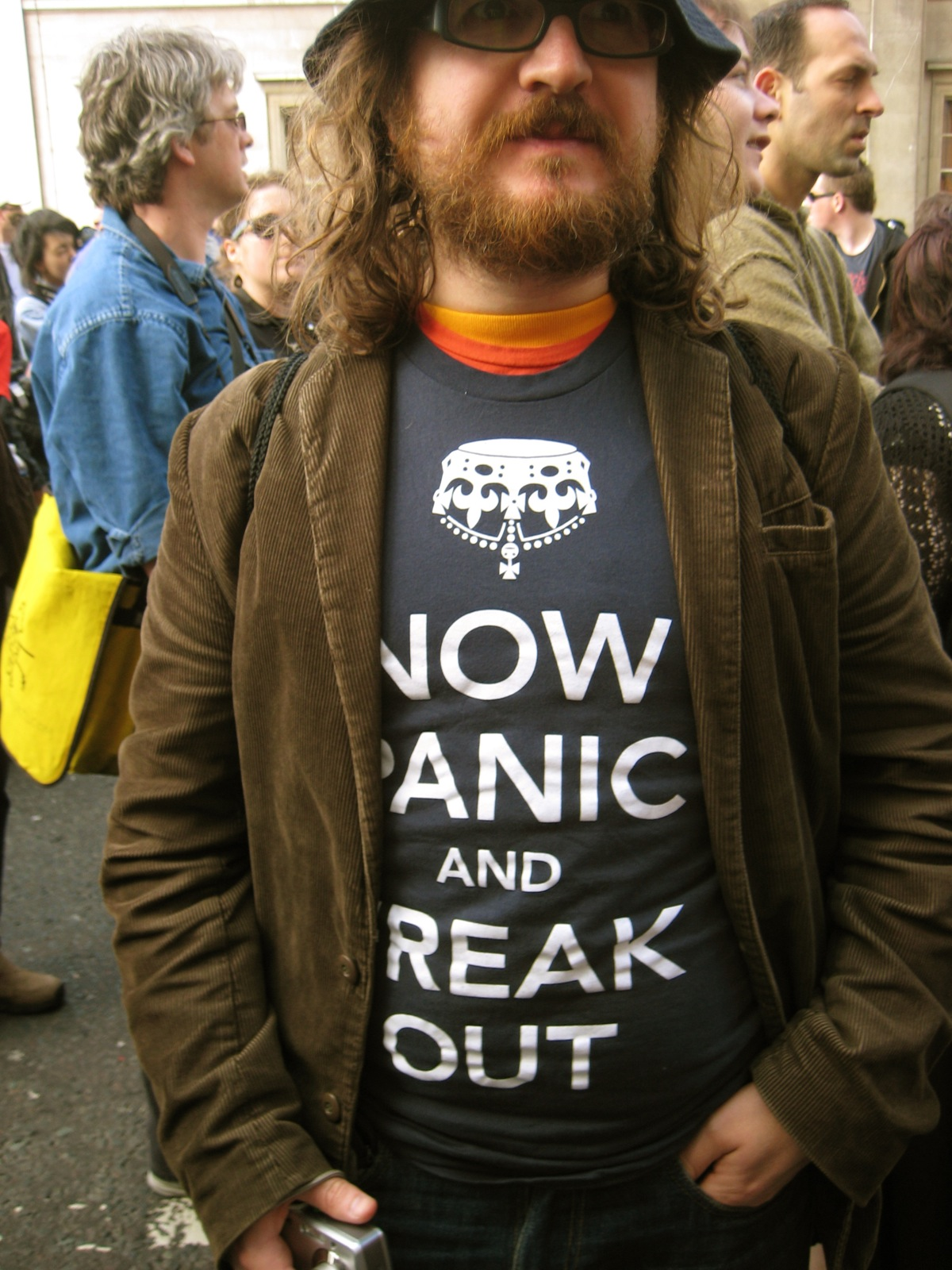
T-shirt parody, 2009

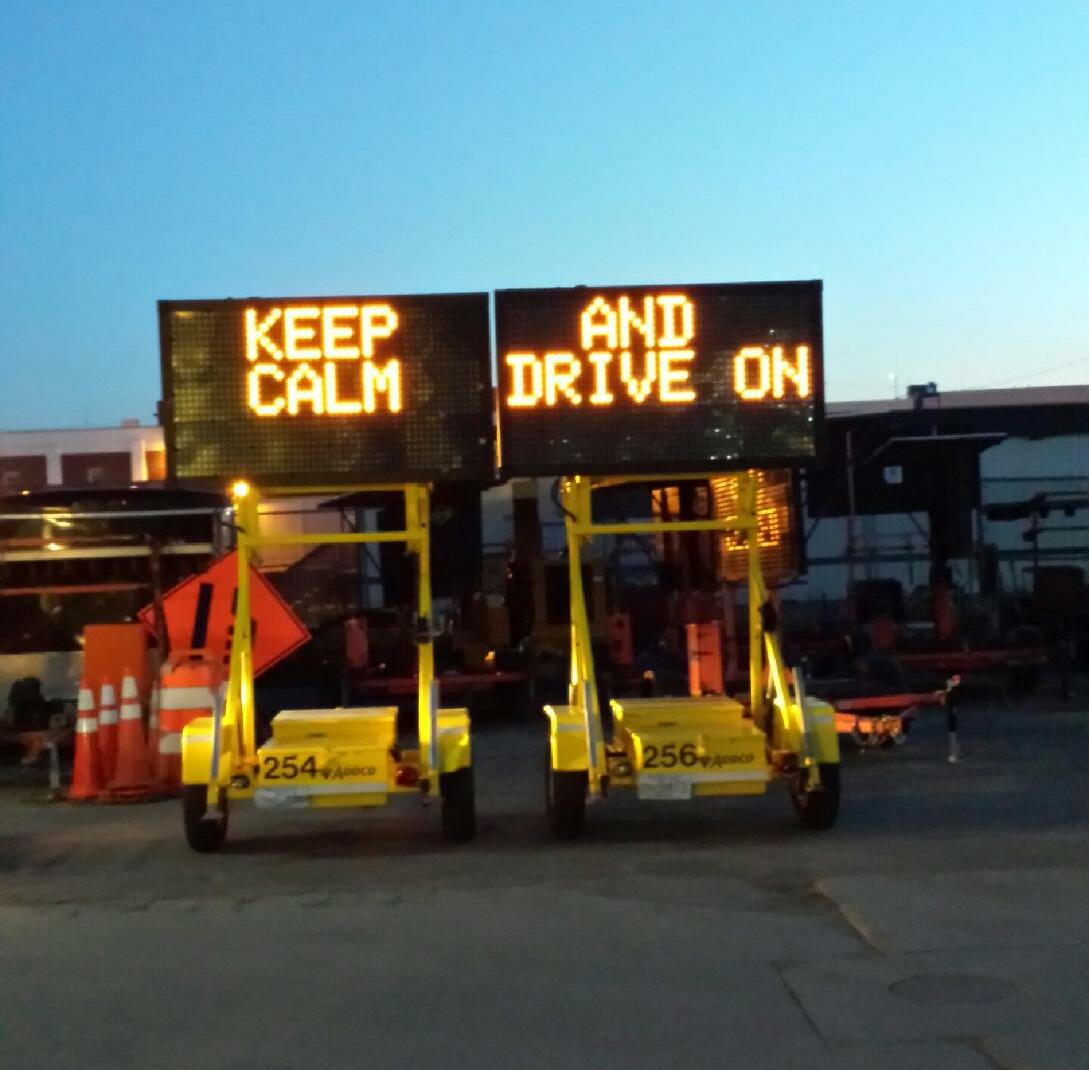
"Keep calm and drive on" matrix sign discouraging road rage in Massachusetts, 2014

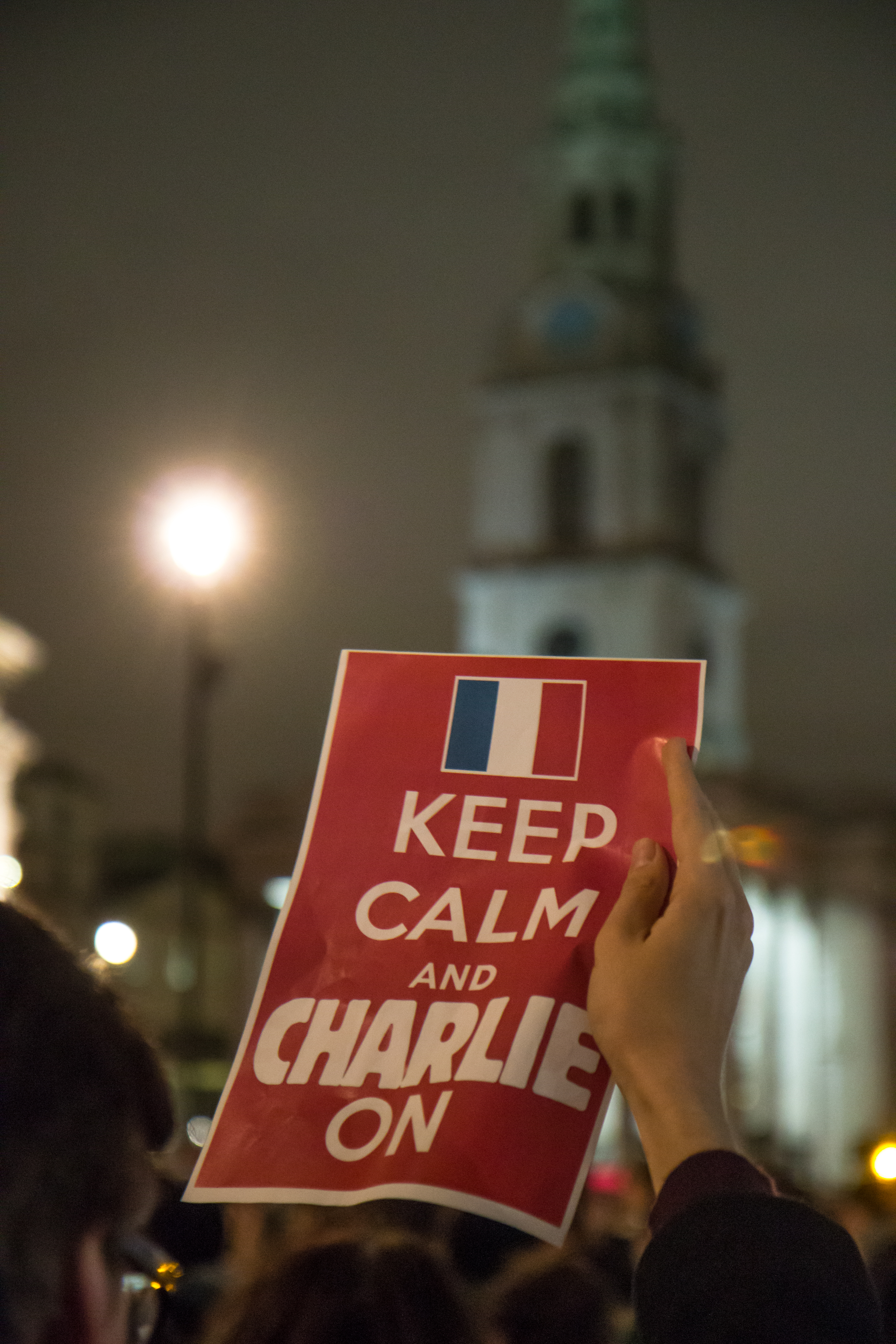
Trafalgar Square event for Charlie Hebdo shooting victims, 2015

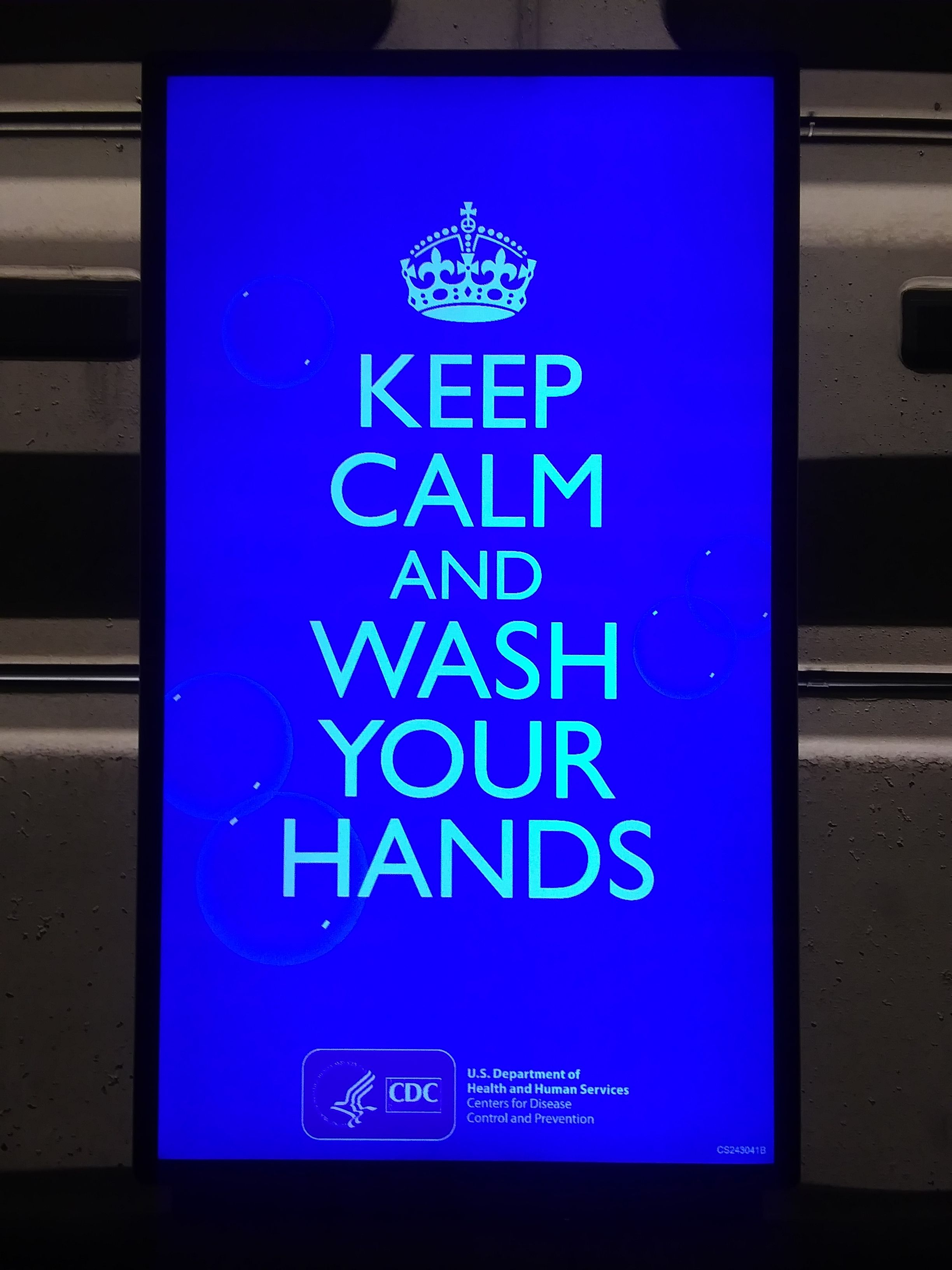
Electronic sign inside a Metro station in Washington, D.C. during the COVID-19 pandemic, 2020

== See also ==
- British propaganda during World War II
- We Can Do It!, an American World War II poster that also became popular decades later
- Live, Laugh, Love, another older motivational phrase that also became popular on decor in the late 2000s.
