= Lambeth Academy =

The Elms Academy

Location
- Elms Road; Lambeth, London, SW4 9ET; England; 51°27′28″N 0°08′24″W

Information
- Former name: Lambeth Academy
- Type: Academy
- Motto: The best in everyone
- Established: 2004
- Local authority: Lambeth
- Specialist: English
- Department for Education URN: 134815 Tables
- Ofsted: Reports
- Headteacher: Amy Welch
- Gender: Mixed
- Age: 11 to 18
- Enrolment: 900
- Houses: Archer, Jones, Thornton, Szabo
- Colours: black and light blue
- Sponsor: United Learning
- Website: http://www.lambeth-academy.org

The Elms Academy is a mixed secondary academy in the London borough of Lambeth. Its sponsor is United Learning.

== Admissions ==
The Elms Academy is owned and run by United Learning, a subsidiary of the United Church Schools Trust. In Summer 2011 the first group of students who had arrived in 2004 completed their A-levels and achieved excellent results. They have established an alumni society called Lambeth Academicals, to maintain contact through sporting social and other activities. 2011 saw results rising to 58% of GCSE students obtaining 5A*-C grades, including English and Maths. This represented a 22% increase, making the academy one of the most improved schools in London and placing it above the national average in this respect.

Lambeth Academy specialises in English with Business & Enterprise. There are around 200 in its integrated sixth form. The Sixth Form intake includes many students from its collaborative schools, The Hurlingham Academy and Holland Park School, as part of a United Learning cluster. It is situated on Elms Road just east of Clapham Common. It lies in the parish of Holy Spirit, Clapham.

== History ==
Lambeth Academy was founded after a four-year campaign by local parents, including the author John O'Farrell, who became the school's first Chair of Governors, a post he held for eight years. He recalls the campaign and his involvement in the school in his memoir 'Things Can Only Get Worse'. The academy was formally opened by Queen Elizabeth II in 2004. The first principal was Ms Pat Millichamp, who retired after two years.

The second principal was Mr Stephen Potter who retired in December 2011 and was then replaced by Ms Jan Shadick, who served in this position until Summer 2017. She was succeeded by Ms Carol Shepherd until her resignation in the Christmas of 2017. Subsequently, she was succeeded by Mr Peter Mathershaw who stood down as headteacher in the summer of 2018, he was replaced by Mr Leon Wilson who is the current Executive Headteacher of this school and the nearby Hurlingham Academy, of which it became a cluster with, allowing both schools to share standards, facilities and some staff.

The chair of governors is Chioma Oganya.

=== Henry Thornton School ===
The academy is built on the site of the Henry Thornton School (HTS). This school opened in 1929 as a boys' grammar school. It had around 450 boys. It was well known in national lacrosse competitions. It became a comprehensive in 1968 with around 1,500 boys, then merged with the Hydeburn School to become the Chestnut Grove School in Balham in 1986, and the site became the Henry Thornton Centre of Clapham and Balham Adult Education Institute. In 2003 the former grammar school was demolished to make way for the academy.

== Notable former pupils ==
=== Lambeth Academy ===
- Diogo Costa, Lambeth Councillor for Oval since 2022 and Software Engineer
- Jamie Flatters, actor, filmmaker and singer.

=== Henry Thornton School ===
- Prof Kenneth Andrews, Professor of History from 1979 to 1988 at the University of Hull
- Prof L. Bruce Archer CBE, Professor from 1971 to 1988 at the Royal College of Art, and President from 1994 to 2005 of the Design Research Society
- Chris Batt OBE, Chief Executive from 2003 to 2007 of the Museums, Libraries and Archives Council
- Hywel Bennett, actor
- Michael Caplan, barrister
- Prof Percy Crowe, Professor in Geography from 1953 to 1971 at the University of Manchester
- John Esmonde and Bob Larbey, scriptwriters who wrote The Good Life
- Prof Michael Farthing, Vice-Chancellor since 2007 of the University of Sussex, and President from 2007 to 2008 of the British Society of Gastroenterology
- Eric Gilder, composer
- Jimmy Hill, ex-footballer and former television sports presenter
- Peter Waterman, boxer
- Peter Katin, concert pianist
- Alun Lewis, actor
- Prof Donald Pashley, Professor of Materials from 1979 to 1982 at Imperial College London
- Tom Phillips, artist
- Sir Norman Prichard, Chairman 1955-56 of London County Council
- Peter Robert Rawson, Group Company Secretary 1992-1997 of Prudential plc
- Prof Herbert Arthur Frederick Turner, Montague Burton Professor of Industrial Relations from 1963 to 1983 at the University of Cambridge
- Michael Thomas (footballer, born 1967), Professional from 1984 until 2001. Played football for Arsenal, Portsmouth, Liverpool, Middlesbrough, Sport Lisboa e Benfica, and Wimbledon, as well as the England Under-21s, England B and the England National Team.
