= List of masters of Darwin College, Cambridge =

The following persons have served as Master of Darwin College, Cambridge since its foundation in 1964.

- 1964 - 1976 Frank George Young
- 1976 - 1982 Moses I. Finley
- 1982 - 1989 Arnold Burgen
- 1989 - 2000 Sir Geoffrey Lloyd
- 2000 - 2012 Willie Brown
- 2012 - 2020 Mary Fowler
- 2020 - Mike Rands
