= Montague Burton Professor =

Montague Burton Professor may refer to:

- Montague Burton Professor of Industrial Relations
- Montague Burton Professor of International Relations
