= G. E. R. Lloyd =

English historian of science (born 1933)

Sir G. E. R. Lloyd
- Born: Sir Geoffrey Ernest Richard Lloyd; 25 January 1933 (age 93)

Academic background
- Education: Charterhouse School; King's College, Cambridge

Academic work
- Discipline: Ancient history
- Sub-discipline: History of science in classical antiquity
- Institutions: King's College, Cambridge; Darwin College, Cambridge

Sir Geoffrey Ernest Richard Lloyd FBA FLSW (born 25 January 1933), usually cited as G. E. R. Lloyd, is a historian of ancient science and medicine at the University of Cambridge. He is the senior scholar in residence at the Needham Research Institute in Cambridge, England.

== Early life ==
His father, a Welsh physician, specialised in tuberculosis. After a nomadic early education in six different schools, he obtained a scholarship to Charterhouse, where, despite an indifferent academic culture, he excelled in mathematics, and learned Italian from Wilfrid Noyce. The curriculum was biased to classics, which he was advised, misleadingly in his later view, to pursue. On obtaining another scholarship to King's College, Cambridge he came under the influence of the pre-Socratics specialist John Raven. He spent a year in Athens (1954–1955) where, apart from learning modern Greek, he also mastered the bouzouki.

== Career ==
A keen interest in anthropology informed his reading of ancient Greek philosophy, and his doctoral studies, conducted under the supervision of Geoffrey Kirk, focused on patterns of polarity and analogy in Greek thought, a thesis which, revised, was eventually published in 1966.

He was called up for National Service in 1958. On 14 March 1959, following training, he was commissioned as a second lieutenant in the British Army's Intelligence Corps. He was given the service number 460084. He was posted to Cyprus after the EOKA insurgency.

On his return to Cambridge in 1960, a chance conversation with Edmund Leach stimulated him to read deeply in the emerging approach of structural anthropology being formulated by Claude Lévi-Strauss. In 1965, thanks to the support of Moses Finley, he was appointed to an assistant lectureship. Consideration of how political discourse affected the modes of scientific discourse and demonstration in Ancient Greece was a recurring theme in his methodology.

After a visit to lecture in China in 1987, Lloyd turned to the study of Classical Chinese. This has added a broad comparative scope to his more recent work, which, following in the wake of Joseph Needham's pioneering studies, analyses how the different political cultures of ancient China and Greece influenced the different forms of scientific discourse in those cultures.

In 1989 he was appointed master of Darwin College, where he remains as an honorary fellow. Presently he spends a part of each year in his other home in Spain, where much of his writing is now done.

== Honours ==
Lloyd was elected a Fellow of the British Academy in 1983 and awarded its Kenyon Medal in 2007. He received the George Sarton Medal of the History of Science Society in 1987. He was elected to Honorary Foreign Membership of the American Academy of Arts and Sciences in 1995, to the International Academy for the History of Science in 1997, the year in which he was knighted for 'services to the history of thought'. In 2013 he received the Dan David Prize on the modern legacy of the ancient world. He is a member of the advisory board of The International Academic Forum. In 2013 he received the Dann David Prize in recognition of his innovative and interdisciplinary research that cuts across traditional boundaries and paradigms. In 2014 he received the International Fyssen Prize for work in Cross-Cultural Cognition. In 2015, he was elected a Fellow of the Learned Society of Wales (FLSW).

== Publications ==
- 1966. Polarity and Analogy: Two Types of Argumentation in Early Greek Thought. Cambridge: Cambridge University Press, ISBN 0-521-05578-4; reprint Bristol Classical Press, 1922. ISBN 0-87220-140-6.
- 1968. Aristotle: The Growth and Structure of his Thought. Cambridge: Cambridge University Press, ISBN 0-521-09456-9.
- 1970. Early Greek Science: Thales to Aristotle. New York: W.W. Norton & Co. ISBN 0-393-00583-6.
- 1973. Greek Science after Aristotle. New York: W.W. Norton & Co., 1973. ISBN 0-393-00780-4.
- 1978. Aristotle on Mind and the Senses (Cambridge Classical Studies). Cambridge: Cambridge University Press, ISBN 0-521-21669-9.
- 1978. with J. Chadwick. Hippocratic Writings (Penguin Classics). Penguin Books. ISBN 0-14-044451-3.
- 1979. Magic Reason and Experience: Studies in the Origin and Development of Greek Science. Cambridge: Cambridge University Press, ISBN 0-521-29641-2.
- 1983. Science, Folklore and Ideology. Cambridge: Cambridge University Press, ISBN 0-521-27307-2.
- 1987. The Revolutions of Wisdom: Studies in the Claims and Practice of Ancient Greek Science (Sather Classical Lectures, 52). Berkeley: University of California Press, ISBN 0-520-06742-8.
- 1990. Demystifying Mentalities. Cambridge: Cambridge University Press, ISBN 0-521-36680-1.
- 1991. Methods and Problems in Greek Science. Cambridge: Cambridge University Press, ISBN 0-521-39762-6
- 1996. Adversaries and Authorities: Investigations into ancient Greek and Chinese Science. Cambridge: Cambridge University Press, ISBN 0-521-55695-3.
- 1996. Aristotelian Explorations. Cambridge: Cambridge University Press, ISBN 0-521-55619-8.
- 2002. The Ambitions of Curiosity: Understanding the World in Ancient Greece and China. Cambridge: Cambridge Univ. Pr. ISBN 0-521-81542-8.
- 2002. with Nathan Sivin. The Way and the Word: Science and Medicine in Early China and Greece. New Haven: Yale University. Press. ISBN 0-300-10160-0.
- 2003. In the Grip of Disease: Studies in the Greek Imagination. New York: Oxford University Press, ISBN 0-19-927587-4.
- 2004. Ancient Worlds, Modern Reflections: Philosophical Perspectives on Greek and Chinese Science and Culture. New York: Oxford University Press, ISBN 0-19-928870-4.
- 2005. The Delusions of Invulnerability: Wisdom and Morality in Ancient Greece, China and Today. London: Duckworth. ISBN 0-7156-3386-4.
- 2006. Principles And Practices in Ancient Greek And Chinese Science (Variorum Collected Studies Series). Aldershot: Ashgate. ISBN 0-86078-993-4.
- 2007. Cognitive Variations: Reflections on the Unity and Diversity of the Human Mind. New York: Oxford University Press ISBN 0-19-921461-1.
- 2009. Disciplines in the Making, Oxford University Press, pp. viii + 215. ISBN 978-0-19-956787-4.
- 2012. Being, Humanity and Understanding, Oxford University Press, pp. 136. ISBN 978-0-19-965472-7.
- 2014. The Ideals of Inquiry, Oxford University Press, pp. 163. ISBN 978-0-19-870560-4.
- 2015. Analogical Investigations: Historical and Cross-Cultural Perspectives on Human Reasoning, Cambridge University Press, pp. 139. ISBN 978-1-107-10784-7.
- 2017. The Ambivalences of Rationality: Ancient and Modern Cross-Cultural Explorations, Cambridge University Press, pp. 132. ISBN 978-1108420044
- 2020. Intelligence and Intelligibility: Cross-Cultural Studies of Human Cognitive Experience, Oxford University Press, pp. 176. ISBN 978-0198854593

Academic offices
| Preceded by Arnold Burgen | Master of Darwin College, Cambridge; 1989–2000 | Succeeded by William Brown |
