= Peter Fowler (physicist) =

British physicist (1923–1996)

Peter Howard Fowler FRS (27 February 1923 — 8 November 1996) was a British physicist and academic.

== Life ==
Fowler was educated at Summer Fields School, Winchester College, and under Cecil Powell at the University of Bristol.

Fowler researched primary cosmic radiation, measuring the presence of beryllium, boron, and lithium in cosmic rays. He developed improved methods for measuring cosmic rays, using high-altitude balloons and later jets, and investigated the radiation hazards of high-altitude supersonic flight. He studied radioactive fallout from the 1986 Chernobyl nuclear power station explosion in Ukraine, and after the 1988 Lockerbie aircraft bombing he developed a thermal neutron-based methodology for screening passengers' luggage.

Fowler served as a radar officer in the wartime RAF (1942–46). Following the D-Day landings, RAF bombers soon experienced intensive German jamming of their Gee navigation system. He used his skills to detect the interference signals and through analysis was able to locate the station responsible, which was subsequently destroyed. It is reported that Goering demanded a court martial over what the Axis powers viewed as a breach of security as they did not believe that it was possible to locate a jamming station so rapidly.

== Awards ==
Fowler won the 1974 Hughes Medal of the Royal Society "for his outstanding contributions to cosmic ray and elementary particle physics".

== Family ==
Fowler was married in 1949 Bathavon, Somerset to the physicist Rosemary Fowler nee Brown. Their daughter is Mary Fowler, former Master of Darwin College, Cambridge. His father was the physicist Sir Ralph Howard Fowler, who determined the state of matter in white dwarf stars. His grandfather was Lord Ernest Rutherford, who discovered the atomic nucleus.
