= Peter Katin =

British pianist and teacher (1930–2015)

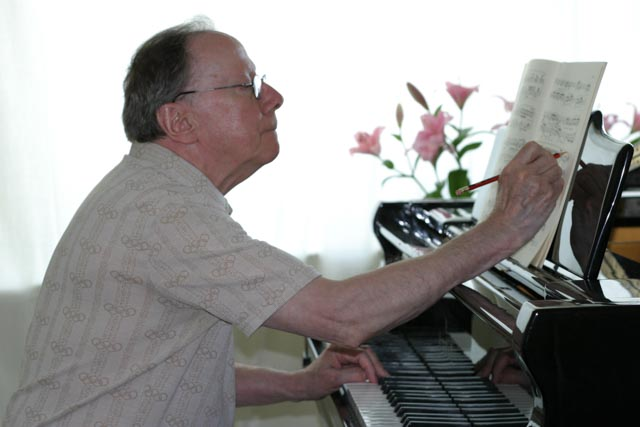
- Katin at home in Bexhill-on-Sea, 13 May 2006
- Born: 14 November 1930; London, England
- Died: 19 March 2015 (aged 84)
- Occupation: Classical Pianist
- Years active: 1955–2005

Peter Roy Katin (/ˈkeɪˌtɪn/ KAY-tin) (14 November 1930 – 19 March 2015) was a British classical pianist and teacher.

== Biography ==
Katin was born in London; his father was sign-painter Jerrold Katin (who was born in Lithuania) and mother Gertrude. Katin was educated at private schools in Balham, Caterham, and East Grinstead and the Henry Thornton School (then known as the South West London Emergency Secondary School) in Clapham, and was admitted to the Royal Academy of Music at the age of 12, four years younger than the official entry age, where he studied under Harold Craxton. Katin made his debut at the Wigmore Hall on 13 December 1948 where the programme included works by Scarlatti, Mozart, Beethoven, Rachmaninoff, Scriabin and Chopin. He went on to give concerts in England, Europe, Africa, the US, and Japan.

In 1952, Katin debuted at The Proms and in 1953 was acclaimed for his performance there of Rachmaninoff's Piano Concerto No. 3 in D minor. In 1958, he became the first British pianist to make a post-war solo tour of the Soviet Union. In 1961, the composer Bryan Kelly wrote Tango especially for Katin.

Katin specialised in Romantic music, particularly Chopin, and Impressionist music. He was acclaimed for his technical command of the piano. He also directed concertos by Mozart and Beethoven from the keyboard. His final Wigmore Hall recital was in January 2004.

Katin wrote many articles on piano technique and interpretation. He lectured at the Royal Academy of Music 1956–1959, University of Western Ontario 1978–1984, and in 1992 was appointed to the Royal College of Music. He also lectured at Thames Valley University. He supported the Campaign for Homosexual Equality in the 1970s.

In 1954, Katin married fellow pianist, Ewa Zweig, with whom he had two sons, Nicholas and Andrew. After a long separation, they divorced in 1988. He lived in Bexhill-on-Sea. His two sons survive him.

== Recordings ==
Katin's recordings include:

Ludwig van Beethoven

- Violin Sonata in C minor, Op. 30 No. 2 (with Alfredo Campoli, violin) (with other works) Orchestral Concert CDs CD3/2009

Johannes Brahms

- A Brahms Recital:

Fantasias Op. 116, Three Intermezzi Op. 117, Two Rhapsodies Op. 79, Variations and Fugue on a Theme of Handel Op. 24 (Olympia OCD 263)

- Peter Katin in Recital: Liszt and Brahms

Liszt: Sonata in B minor
Brahms: Variations and Fugue on a theme of Handel
Liszt: Sonetto 123 del Petrarca (Années de Pélérinage, Book 2)
Athene-Minerva ATHCD9 23009

- Brahms: Violin Sonata No. 3 in D minor, Op. 108 (with Alfredo Campoli, violin) (with other works) Orchestral Concert CDs CD3/2009
- His playing of Brahms's Piano Concerto No. 1 was used as background music to the film The L-Shaped Room (1962).

Frédéric Chopin

- Chopin: First and Last

Variations Brilliantes, Op. 12, Mazurka in G minor, Op. 24, No. 1, Mazurka in C major, Op. 24, No. 2, Mazurka in A flat major, Op. 24, No. 3, Mazurka in B flat minor, Op. 24, No. 4, Mazurka in F minor, Op. 68, No. 4, Rondo in C minor, Op. 1, Souvenir de Paganini, Nocturne in C sharp minor, Waltz in D flat major, Op. 64, No. 1, Waltz in C sharp minor, Op. 64, No. 2, Waltz in A flat major, Op. 64, No. 3, Sonata in C minor, Op. 4 (3rd mvmt), Polonaise in G minor, KK IIa, No. 1, Polonaise in B flat major, KK IVa, No. 1, Polonaise in A flat major, KK Iva, No. 2, Berceuse, Op. 57
Athene ATHCD11 / Diversions DIV24116

- Ballade in F minor, Op. 52; 3 Mazurkas, Op. 59; Sonata in B minor, Op. 58; Barcarolle, Op. 60; Polonaise-Fantasie Op. 61 Olympia OCD 186
- Variations, Op. 12; 4 Mazurkas, Op. 24; Sonata in B flat minor, Op. 35; Ballade in A flat, Op. 47; Andante Spianato and Grande Polonaise, Op. 22 Olympia OCD 193
- Complete Polonaises and Waltzes Olympia OCD 289A/B
- 4 Scherzos; Fantasy, Op. 49 Unicorn UKCD 2008*
- Complete Nocturnes and Impromptus Olympia OCD 254A/B
- 4 Waltzes (part of compilation album) Belart 450 000-2
- Polonaise in F sharp minor, Op. 24; Sonata in B minor, Op. 58; Nocturne in D flat, Op. 27, No. 2; Fantasy, Op. 49 (live recording from the Snape Maltings Hallmark 350142
- Complete Nocturnes (different version to the Olympia issue) Hallmark IMP 30367 02357 (2CD)
- Peter Katin: A Chopin Recital

Four Songs from Seventeen Polish Songs (transcribed by Liszt), Op. posth. 74; Piano Sonata No. 3 in B minor, Op. 58; Scherzo No. 4 in E major, Op. 54; Mazurka No. 14 in G minor, Op. 24 No. 1; Andante spianato et grande polonaise brillante in E flat major, Op. 22; Nocturne in F sharp major, Op. 15 No. 2; Waltz in C sharp minor, Op. 64 No. 2
(Recording issued in 2010 to mark Katin's 80th birthday and Chopin's 200th anniversary) Orchestral Concert CDs CD11/2010

Muzio Clementi

- Clementi on Clementi

Sonata in F sharp minor, Op.25, No. 5, Sonata in B flat major, Op. 24, No. 2, Sonata in G minor, Op. 7, No. 3, Sonata in D major, Op. 25, No. 6, Sonata in F minor, Op.13, No. 6
Athene ATHCD4 / Diversions DIV24113

Edvard Grieg

- Ballade, Op. 24; 5 Klavierstücke nach Eigenen Lieren; Sonata in E minor, Op. 7; 4 Lyric Pieces - Olympia OCD 197
- Complete Lyric Pieces (recorded December 1989) - Unicorn UKCD 2033-5*
- Piano Concerto in A minor, Op. 16 - Classics for Pleasure CFP 160 (1971)

Aram Khachaturian;

- Piano Concerto in D-flat major (LSO/Hugo Rignold); César Franck: Symphonic Variations (LSO/Eugene Goossens) Everest EVC 9060 (the Piano Concerto recording was later issued by Bescol Compact Classics on CD 539)

Franz Liszt

- Dante Sonata; 3 Liebesträume; 2 Polonaises; 6 Consolations Olympia OCD 199
- Peter Katin in Recital: Liszt and Brahms

Liszt: Sonata in B minor
Brahms: Variations and Fugue on a theme of Handel
Liszt: Sonetto 123 del Petrarca (Années de Pélérinage, Book 2)
Athene-Minerva ATHCD9 23009

William Mathias

- Piano Concerto No. 3 (LSO/David Atherton) (with other works) Lyrita SRCD 325

Felix Mendelssohn

- 2 Piano Concertos; (LSO/Anthony Collins); 2 Concert Pieces (LPO/Martinon); c/w other Mendelssohn works played by John Ogdon & Brenda Lucas Double Decca 4524102

Wolfgang Amadeus Mozart

- Complete Piano Sonatas Olympia OCD 230-4 (boxed set OCD5003)
- Piano Sonatas (Altara ALT 1026, 5 CDs)
- Violin Sonata in A major, K526 (with Alfredo Campoli, violin) (with other works) Orchestral Concert CDs CD3/2009

Sergei Prokofiev;

- Piano Concerto No. 3 (Prague Symphony Orchestra/Košler) (with other works) Orchestral Concert CDs CD2/2008

Sergei Rachmaninoff

- Piano Concerto No. 1 (LPO/Boult) Belart 461 3482
- Piano Concerto No. 2 The New Symphony Orchestra of London/Colin Davis London ffrr STS 15225
- Complete Preludes - Hallmark IMP PCD2052

Domenico Scarlatti

- 14 Sonatas Claudio CR35102-2

Franz Schubert

- Impromptus, D.899 and D.935 (Clementi square piano 1832) Athene ATHCD5 / Diversions 24112
- 3 Klavierstücke, D.946; Valses Nobles, D.969; Moments Musicaux, D.780 (Clementi 1832) Athene ATHCD7 / Diversions DIV23007
- Sonatas in B-flat, D.960 & A minor, D.537 Olympia OCD 188
- Drei Klavierstücke, D.946; Valses Nobles, D.969; Moments Musicaux, D.780

(Played on a Clementi square piano of 1832.)
Athene-Minerva ATHCD7 / Diversions DIV23007

- Impromptus, D.899 and D.935

Four Impromptus, D.899
Four Impromptus, D.935
Diversions CD24112

Robert Schumann

- Kinderszenen, Op. 15; Sonata in G minor, Op. 22; Carnaval Op. 9 Olympia OCD 218
- Piano Concerto (LSO/Goossens) (with other works) Everest EVC 9045-6

Pyotr Ilyich Tchaikovsky

- Sonata in G, Op. 37; The Seasons, Op. 37a Olympia OCD 192
- Piano Concerto No. 1; Grieg: Piano Concerto; Litolff: Scherzo (with LSO/LPO, cond Edric Kundell, Sir Colin Davis) Olympia OCD 235
- Piano Concerto No. 1; Litolff: Scherzo (LPO/John Pritchard) Classics for Pleasure 5 72699 2

Tchaikovsky: Concert Fantasia in G major, Op.56; Rachmaninov: Piano Concerto No.1 in F sharp minor Op.1 (LPO/Adrian Boult) - Decca SXL 2034

William Walton

- Sinfonia Concertante (LSO/Walton) (with other works) Lyrita SRCD 224

Ralph Vaughan Williams

- Fantasia on the Old 104th (LPO/LPC/Boult) (with other works) EMI CDM 769962-2

Others

- Portrait of a pianist: Bach: Chromatic Fantasy and Fugue; Beethoven: 6 Variations, Op. 34; Haydn: Sonata in G, HobXVI/39; Debussy: Estampes; Liszt: Vallée d’Obermann Olympia OCD 189
- Claude Debussy, Children's Corner: Gabriel Grovlez, L'Almamach aus Images; Déodat de Séverac, En Vacances; Jacques Ibert, Histoires; Simax PSC 1067
- Peter Katin: 50 years of music making

Bach: Prelude and Fugue in B flat minor (from the Well Tempered Clavier – Book 1)
Mozart: Rondo in A minor
Beethoven: Piano Sonata, Op. 27, No. 2 ("Moonlight")
Schubert: Impromptus in G flat and E flat, from D.899
Debussy: Suite bergamasque
Chopin: Polonaise-Fantaisie, Op. 61
RP Music RP001
