= Barter Books =

Second-hand bookshop in Alnwick, Northumberland, England

Coordinates: 55°24′37″N 1°41′58″W

Barter Books is in the former Alnwick railway station

Barter Books is a second-hand bookshop in the historic English market town of Alnwick, Northumberland, owned and run by Stuart and Mary Manley. It has over 350,000 visitors a year, 40% of whom are from outside the area, and is one of the largest second-hand bookshops in Europe. It is considered a local tourist attraction and has been described as "the British Library of second-hand bookshops."

The bookshop is in the Victorian Alnwick railway station, designed by William Bell and opened in 1887. The station was in use until the closure of the Alnwick branch line in 1968; Barter Books was opened in 1991. It is open every day including bank holidays except for Christmas Day.

Inside the bookshop

The shop also houses a cafe called The Station Buffet which serves hot food all day to customers at tables in the original tiled waiting rooms of the railway station.

The shop is notable for its use of a barter system, whereby customers can exchange their books for credit against future purchases; standard cash purchases are also available.

== Keep Calm and Carry On poster ==
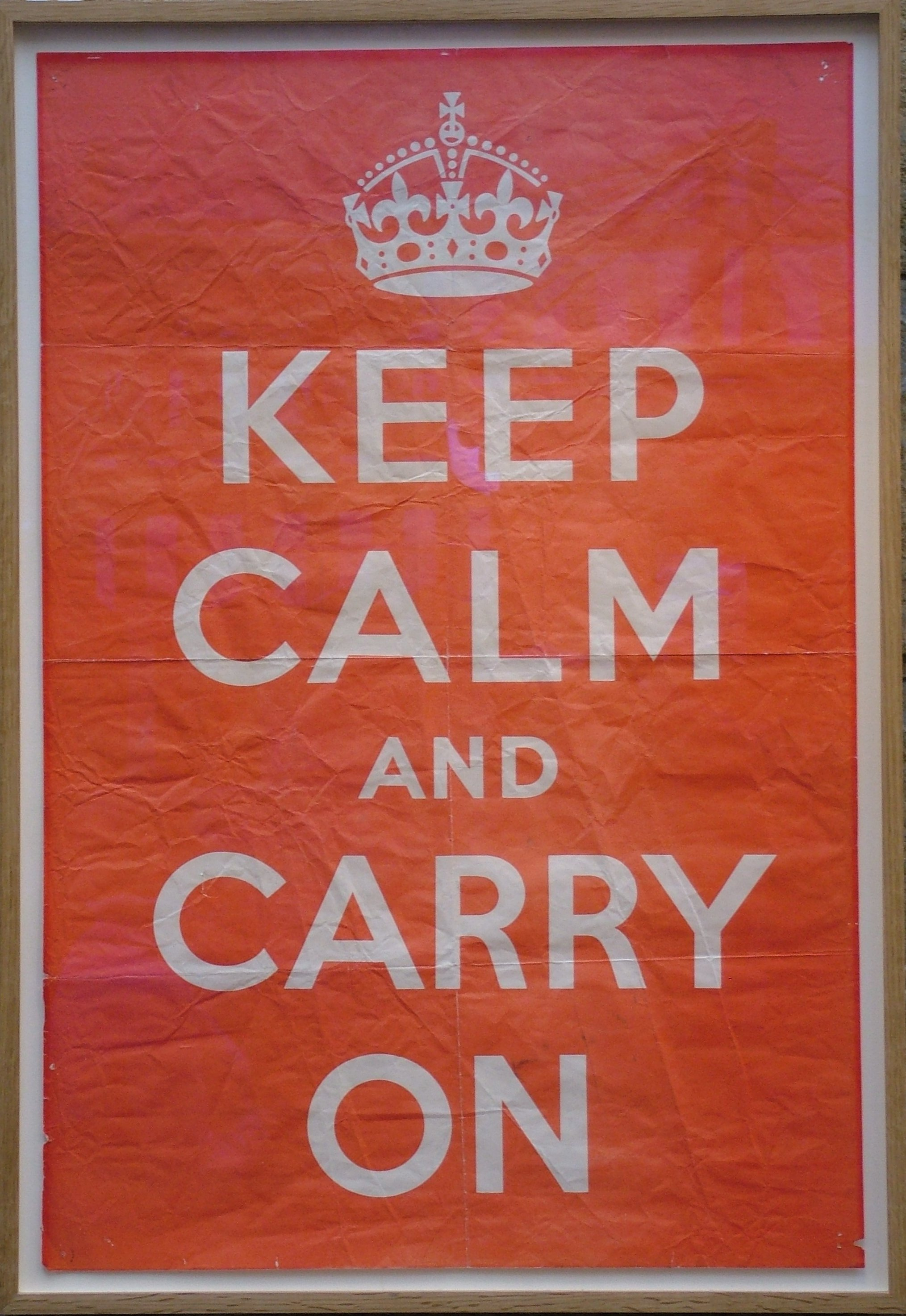
Original copy of the 1939 Keep Calm And Carry On poster, in Barter Books, Alnwick, Northumberland.

In 2000 the owner discovered, in a box of old books bought at an auction, a World War II poster from 1939 with the message "Keep Calm and Carry On". The shop owners framed it and hung it up by the cash register; it attracted so much interest that Manley began to produce and sell copies.

In late 2005, Guardian journalist Susie Steiner featured the replica posters as a Christmas gift suggestion, raising their profile still further. Other companies followed the Manleys' example, and the design rapidly began to be used as the theme for a wide range of products. Mary Manley later commented, "I didn't want it trivialised; but of course now it's been trivialised beyond belief."

== See also ==
- Book trade in the United Kingdom
