= Mike Rands =

British conservation biologist

- Born: Michael Russell Wheldon Rands; 2 August 1956 (age 70)
- Education: University of Oxford (DPhil); University of East Anglia (BSc)
- Scientific career
- Fields: Conservation biology; Ecology
- Workplaces: Darwin College, Cambridge; University of Cambridge
- Website: www.darwin.cam.ac.uk/dr-michael-rands

Michael Russell Wheldon Rands (born 2 August 1956) is a British conservation biologist. He is the Master of Darwin College, Cambridge at the University of Cambridge and a fellow at the Cambridge Judge Business School. He was previously the executive director of the Cambridge Conservation Initiative. Prior to this he was chief executive of BirdLife International.

== Early life and education ==
Rands was born on 2 August 1956. He was educated at Dartington Hall School, the University of East Anglia and the University of Oxford. He gained his doctorate in ecology at the Edward Grey Institute of Field Ornithology, Department of Zoology and Wolfson College, Oxford.

== Career ==
After his DPhil, Rands carried out post-doctoral research with the Game & Wildlife Conservation Trust, conducting field experiments that helped establish the Conservation headland as a method for increasing wildlife populations in agricultural ecosystems, a practice that became enshrined in UK and EU legislation and policy. In 1986 he joined the International Council for Bird Preservation as programme director where he played a leading role in creating BirdLife International. He became director of strategic planning and policy at BirdLife International in 1994 before becoming its chief executive from 1996 to 2009.

In 2009 he became the founding director of the Cambridge Conservation Initiative (CCI). He led the creation of the Cambridge Conservation Campus, endorsed by Sir David Attenborough, within the flagship David Attenborough Building, which opened in 2013. In 2018, under his leadership, CCI launched the Endangered Landscapes Programme, a collaboration with the Arcadia Fund to restore European landscapes for life.

In October 2019, it was announced that he had been elected as Master of Darwin College, Cambridge: he took up the post on 1 October 2020. He is also a Deputy Vice-Chancellor of the University of Cambridge and Trustee of the Cambridge Commonwealth, European & International Trust. In 2021, the University of East Anglia announced that he would receive an Honorary Doctorate in Science in July 2022.

Academic offices
Preceded by Mary Fowler	Master of Darwin College, Cambridge; 2020 to present	Incumbent
