= Rosemary Fowler =

British physicist (born 1926)

- Born: 1926 (age 99–100); Suffolk, England
- Education: University of Bristol
- Spouse: Peter Fowler
- Children: 3, including Mary Fowler
- Awards: Honorary Doctor of Science
- Scientific career
- Doctoral advisor: C. F. Powell

Rosemary Fowler (née Brown; born 1926) is a British physicist who in 1948 as a 22-year-old doctoral researcher discovered the kaon (or K meson particle). While studying photographic plates that had been left exposed to cosmic rays, she identified a new configuration of tracks within the photographic emulsion that she recognised as being the decay of an unknown charged particle. Her discovery contributed to the introduction into particle physics of the property of strangeness, and to physicists' understanding that parity is not conserved in weak interactions – features that now form an integral part of the Standard Model of particle physics.

== Early life and education ==
Born in Suffolk in 1926, Brown grew up in Malta, Portsmouth and finally Bath, as her family moved to follow the postings of her father, a Royal Naval engineer. At school in wartime Bath, she excelled in maths and science, and was the only girl in her year to go to university. In 1947, she became one of the first women to gain first class honours in physics at the University of Bristol.

== Research ==
After graduating from Bristol, Brown became a doctoral researcher in the group of Cecil Powell, a British physicist and pioneer in the use of nuclear emulsion coated plates to investigate cosmic rays entering the Earth's atmosphere. Powell and his team had achieved success with these techniques, and had already discovered a theorised particle, the pi meson or pion.

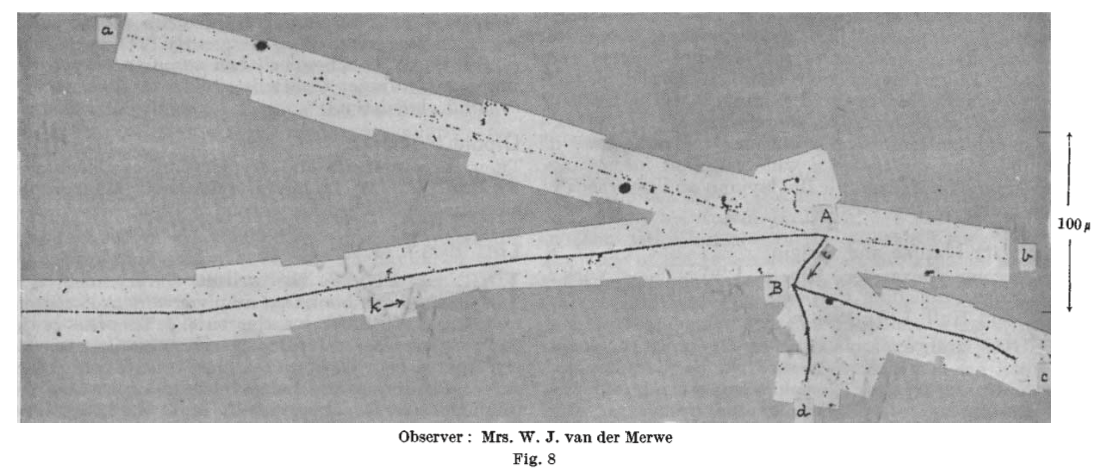
The "k track" plate showing three-pion decay of a positively-charged kaon. The kaon (k) enters at left and decays into a π^{−} meson (a) and two π^{+} mesons (b and c). The π^{−} meson then interacts with a nucleus in the emulsion at B.

Working alongside her fellow PhD student and future husband Peter Fowler, Brown studied the tracks left on stacks of photographic plates that were exposed to cosmic rays at the Sphinx Observatory, a high-altitude laboratory at Jungfraujoch, Switzerland. When Minnie van der Merwe, one of the team of "scanners" (non-physicist assistants), passed her a plate with an unusual configuration of tracks, Brown recognised it as a candidate for the decay of a new meson, called at that time the 'tau meson' (not to be confused with the entirely different elementary particle currently called the tau). The group published their findings in a 1949 paper in Nature which included a photograph of what became known as the 'k track' plate.

Brown's 'tau meson' appeared similar to the 'theta meson' that had been discovered earlier by G.D. Rochester and C.C. Butler of the University of Manchester, except that it decayed into three pions rather than the two of the 'theta meson'. Since the two decay paths have different parities, the physics of the time suggested that in spite of their apparent similarity the particles could not be the same (the 'theta-tau puzzle'). The puzzle was later resolved by the introduction into the theory of a new strangeness quantum number, and by the 1957 experimental discovery that parity was not conserved by the weak interaction (the fundamental interaction that governs kaon decay).

Powell was awarded the Nobel Prize for Physics in 1950 "for his development of the photographic method of studying nuclear processes and his discoveries regarding mesons made with this method."

== Personal life and legacy ==
Rosemary Brown and Peter Fowler married in 1949. She never completed her doctorate, but continued to assist her husband while raising their three daughters – one of whom, the geophysicist Mary Fowler, became Master of Darwin College, Cambridge.

In 2004, Rosemary Fowler supported the Royal Astronomical Society to establish the Fowler award for early achievement in astronomy, in memory of her husband Peter and her father-in-law Ralph H. Fowler.

== Awards ==
In July 2024, at the age of 98, Fowler was awarded an honorary doctorate of science by the University of Bristol. The university stated "Rosemary's discovery of particles and contribution to our understanding of fundamental interactions in physics has often been attributed to Powell and her husband Peter Fowler, and this honorary degree acknowledges the vital role she has played in science." Presenting the award, Sir Paul Nurse, Chancellor of the University of Bristol, said "Rosemary's work in particle discovery in the 1940s, as a physicist at Bristol, paved the way for critical discoveries that continue to shape the work of today's physicists, and our understanding of the universe." Dr Fowler said that she felt "very honoured" and that she had not "done any thing since to deserve special respect."

== Publications ==
- R. Brown; U. Camerini; Fowler, Peter; H. Muirhead; Powell, Cecil Frank; D. M. Ritson (1949). "Observations with Electron-Sensitive Plates Exposed to Cosmic Radiation". Nature. 163 (4132): 47–51. Bibcode:1949Natur.163...47B. doi:10.1038/163047a0. Wikidata Q60256948.
- R. Brown; U. Camerini; Fowler, Peter; H. Muirhead; Powell, Cecil Frank; D. M. Ritson (1949). "Observations with Electron-Sensitive Plates Exposed to Cosmic Radiation*: PART 2. FURTHER EVIDENCE FOR THE EXISTENCE OF UNSTABLE CHARGED PARTICLES, OF MASS ∼ 1,000 me, AND OBSERVATIONS ON THEIR MODE OF DECAY". Nature. 163 (4133): 82–87. Bibcode:1949Natur.163...82B. doi:10.1038/163082a0. Wikidata Q60246802.
- Brown, R.H.; Camerini, U.; Fowler, P.H.; Heitler, H.; King, D.T.; Powell, C.F. (15 July 1949). "LXXIX. Nuclear transmutations produced by cosmic-ray particles of great energy .-Part I. Observations with photographic plates exposed at an altitude of 11,000 feet". The London, Edinburgh, and Dublin Philosophical Magazine and Journal of Science. 40 (307): 862–881. doi:10.1080/14786444908561408. ISSN 1941-5982.
