= William Brown (industrial relations expert) =

British industrial relations expert (1945–2019)

Willie Brown
- Born: 22 April 1945
- Died: 1 August 2019 (aged 74)
- Education: Wadham College, Oxford
- Known for: Industrial Relations
- Scientific career
- Fields: Economics
- Workplaces: Wolfson College, Cambridge, University of Warwick

William Arthur Brown, CBE (22 April 1945 – 1 August 2019), also known as Willie Brown, was an academic specialising in the field of industrial relations, who served as Master of Darwin College, Cambridge.

== Education and academic career ==
Brown was born in Leeds, where his father Arthur Joseph Brown, CBE, FBA (1914–2003) was Professor of Economics (1947–1979) and Pro-Vice-Chancellor (1975–1977) at the University of Leeds .

After attending Leeds Grammar School and graduating from Wadham College, Oxford, Brown worked at the National Board for Prices and Incomes as an economic assistant. From there he went to the new University of Warwick, moving to the Economic and Social Research Council's Industrial Relations Research Unit when it was established at Warwick in 1970. Ten years later he became its director.

In 1985 Brown was elected as a Fellow of Wolfson College, Cambridge and also became the fourth Montague Burton Professor of Industrial Relations at the University of Cambridge, a position he held until 2012 when he was awarded the status of emeritus professor.

In 2000 he became the Master of Darwin College, Cambridge. He announced his retirement from the post of Master and was succeeded by Professor Mary Fowler in October 2012.

At Cambridge University Brown served as Chair of the Faculty of Economics and Politics and was Chair of the Faculty of Social and Political Sciences. He was also the chairman of Board of Graduate Studies as the Vice-Chancellor's deputy.

Brown was one of the representatives of Oxford School of Industrial Relations. Brown's research was concerned with workplace bargaining, pay determination, and the effect of legal change and outside intervention on labour relations. For more than twenty years he served as an ACAS arbitrator, was a member of ACAS Council, and a member of the Low Pay Commission since it was established to manage the National Minimum Wage in 1997.

== Honours ==
In 2002 Brown was awarded a CBE for services to employment relations.

== Publications ==
- List of papers by William Brown

== Notes ==
Academic offices
Preceded by Herbert Turner	Montague Burton Professor of Industrial Relations, Cambridge University; 1985 – 2012	Succeeded by Coen Teulings
Preceded by G. E. R. Lloyd	Master of Darwin College, Cambridge; 2000 – 2012	Succeeded by Mary Fowler
