= Herbert Arthur Frederick Turner =

British economist and statistician

Herbert Arthur Frederick Turner (1919–1998) was a British economist, statistician, and academic. His great strength was a thorough understanding of economics and statistics, particularly the operation of labour markets and the limitations of available statistics. This set him apart from most other academic industrial relations specialists. He was an inspiring lecturer and his tutorials and post-graduate supervisions were challenging and provocative as students were prodded and persuaded into thinking.

== Personal life ==
Turner, known as Bert to family, friends, and colleagues, was born in London on 11 December 1919, the eldest son of Frederick Turner and Elizabeth May King; he had three siblings. Turner's fourth marriage, to a French academic, led him to spend much of his later years in France with his family. He died in Veneux- les –Sablons, near Fontainebleau, on 2 December 1998, a few days short of his 79th birthday.

== Career ==
=== Education ===
Turner studied at the Henry Thornton School in Clapham before going to the London School of Economics, aged 16, to study with Harold Laski. As a young promising left-wing intellectual, he interacted with the Webbs and, through Leonard Woolf, with the Bloomsbury group. He graduated in June 1939 and spent the war years first in the army then on the Second Sea Lord's staff.

In 1944, Turner joined the research and economic department of the TUC. He served as part of the team that prepared the Interim Report on Post-War Reconstruction, which mapped out the Attlee government's programme. Turner worked under Sir Walter Citrine, which developed his lasting interest in economic policy, trade union activities and management and industrial relations. In 1947, Turner became Assistant Education Secretary for the TUC.

In 1950, Turner was elected to the lectureship in industrial relations at University of Manchester. Senior Lecturer in 1959, he defended his PhD on industrial relations in the cotton industry in 1960, which still is the seminal work on the subject.

=== Professor ===
Turner moved to Leeds University in 1961, when he was elected to the Montague Burton Chair of Industrial Relations, then to the Cambridge chair in 1964. He stayed there until his retirement from the Professorship, to be succeeded by William Brown, the son of one of his Leeds colleagues, in 1983. On his election to the Cambridge chair, Bert Turner became a Professorial Fellow of Churchill College, and a Life Fellow on becoming Professor Emeritus in 1984.

From his arrival in Cambridge, Bert Turner's career took two different but complementary directions. The nature of his research together with the world political conjuncture meant that he was very much in demand as an expert and consultant at the time of decolonisation. As a Visiting Professor, he taught at the universities of Lusaka (1969), Harvard and M.I.T. (1971–72), Sydney (1976–77), Hong Kong (1978–79, 1985–88), Bombay and Lucknow (1983) at South China University of Technology (1986), and Zhongshan (1987). He was also a founding member of the Department of Industrial Relations at Monash University in Melbourne.

=== Governmental consultant ===
Turner also served as an advisor and consultant for foreign governments and international organisations. The first of such missions was a fairly sensitive one in the Congo where he met with both Moise Tshombé and Patrice Lumumba under the aegis of the UNO. Through the late sixties and seventies he thus worked in Zambia, Tanzania, Egypt, Ethiopia, Fiji, Papua New Guinea and other developing countries After working at the ILO in Geneva for some time, he was sent to Malawi (1967), and to Iran (1975). The last of these international missions was undertaken for the World Bank in China in 1988. As Hong Kong's transfer to China was looming, he was granted a last Leverhume Senior Fellowship from 1985 to 1988, to assess the labour force situation in the colony. Through the years, on such complex and sometimes sensitive expeditions, he was accompanied by a team of younger assistants who have now become experts in their own right, such as Dudley Jackson, Keith Hart, Patricia Fosh, or Ng Sek Hong.

=== Domestic economic issues ===
On the home front, Turner is famous for his work on the motor industry, for which he gathered around him a notable team, including Geoffrey Roberts and Garfield Clack, who co-signed the relevant book with him. Turner was the first academic in Britain to consider the Swedish concept of wage drift (the tendency of earnings to increase faster than agreed wage rates). He innovated in examining the impact of trade union organisation and policy on wages and wage differentials. He was among the first to consider the potential for prices and incomes policies to counter wage and price inflation. He also carried out ground-breaking studies of strikes and the extent to which trade unions cause inflation. In 1967, he became a part-time member of the National Board for Prices and Incomes, until its dissolution in 1970.

== Major works ==
- Trade Unions, Growth, Structure and Policy. A Comparative Study of the Cotton Unions, 1962
- Wages : the Problems for Underdeveloped Countries, 1965
- Wage Trend Wage Policy and Collective Bargaining, 1965
- Prices Wages and Incomes Policies, 1966
- Labour Relations in the Motor Industry, 1967
- Is Britain Really Strike-Prone ?, 1969
- Do Trade Unions Cause Inflation ?, 1972
- Management Characteristics and Labour Conflict, 1978
- The Last Colony : but Whose ?, 1980
- The ILO and Hong Kong, 1986
- Between Two Societies : Hong Kong Labour in Transition, 1991

== Notes and references ==
Academic offices
Preceded by Harold Stewart Kirkaldy	Montague Burton Professor of Industrial Relations, Cambridge University; 1963–1985	Succeeded by William Arthur Brown
