= The Hurlingham Academy =

Location
- Peterborough Road, Fulham; London, SW6 3ED; England; 51.4677°N 0.1963°W

Information
- Former name: Hurlingham and Chelsea School
- Type: Academy
- Motto: The best in everyone
- Established: 1956
- Local authority: Hammersmith and Fulham London Borough Council
- Trust: United Learning Trust
- Department for Education URN: 141617 Tables
- Ofsted: Reports
- Principal: Leon Wilson
- Gender: Mixed
- Age range: 11–16
- Enrolment: 413 (2018)
- Capacity: 750
- Houses: Aequitas (Equality); Caritas (Charity); Unitas (Unity); Veritas (Honesty)
- Website: www.thehurlinghamacademy.org.uk

The Hurlingham Academy (formerly Hurlingham and Chelsea School) is an 11–16 mixed secondary school with academy status in Fulham, London, England. It was formerly a community school and adopted its current name after converting to an academy on 9 December 2014. It became part of the United Learning Trust.

== History ==
The school's original buildings were constructed in 1956 by Sheppard Robson & Partners for the London County Council. It opened in 1956 and originally housed the 500 girls of Hurlingham School from Hugon Road in Fulham. The school became a mixed school in 1982 when it merged with a boys’ school called Chelsea School, which has no relations with the nearby Chelsea Academy or Fulham Boys' School. The school was one of nine schools in the London Borough of Hammersmith and Fulham serving secondary aged children, of which there are three academies, three foundation schools, one voluntary-aided school, one free school, with Hurlingham and Chelsea being the sole community school.

The school has had a turbulent history. It was described as a "failing school" in the pilot Ofsted inspections in 1994, which prompted discussions of closure until it was given a clean bill of health later in the same year. Provision was judged ‘good’ by Ofsted in 1997 and the school was highlighted for its improvement in HMCI's 1999 Annual Report. Because results were consistently below government floor targets, however, the school was designated as a "school facing challenging circumstances" in 2003. In March 2004 the school was placed under special measures. In November 2005, the school emerged from special measures. A proposal to close the school was made by the Local Authority in September 2006, but the school successfully campaigned against this decision, and the proposal was later withdrawn in April 2007 before adjudication.

In January 2008, the school was recognized as the most improved school in London for the proportion of students achieving at least 7 A*–C grades at GCSE. The federation with both Langford and Sulivan Primary Schools was established in February 2012 to raise educational standards through collaborative efforts and provide an integrated educational, youth, and community program across the Sands End ward. All three schools are independent of each other, however do all share a governing body. In 2005, Ofsted reported significant improvements in the school's performance. In 2009, the school received funding to expand and upgrade its facilities, and consider adding a sixth form. In October 2013, the school was placed back into special measures by Ofsted.

In 2014, the school was sponsored by United Learning, and was renamed "The Hurlingham Academy" in 2015.

In 2017, the school became a part of a cluster with The Elms Academy (then named Lambeth Academy) near Clapham Common, allowing both schools to share standards and facilities, and some staff. Holland Park School would later become a part of this cluster, after joining United Learning in 2023. An increasing number of students from the school go on to attend Sixth Form at Elms, as well.

In April 2024, following an Ofsted inspection, the school was officially rated an "Outstanding" school, up from its report in 2017, where it was deemed "Good".

== Headteachers ==
Year Started	Year Finished	Name	Notes
September 2026	Present	Ms Juliette Quinton	
January 2015	September 2026	Mr Leon Wilson	
January 2014	December 2014	Mr Craig Griffiths	
2004	2013	Dr Phil Cross	
2003	2004	Ms Patrice Canavan	
1999	2003	Mlle Veronique Gerber	
1994	1999	Mr Michael Murphy	
1994	1994	Mrs Jill Coughlan	
1992	1993	Mr Reg Burton	
1987	1992	Mr Alan Jones	
1979	1987	Mrs Ruth Clarke	

== Notable alumni ==
- Carole Caplin, health and wellbeing consultant
- Lauren Mahon, BBC Radio presenter, British cancer activist and founder of Girls vs Cancer.
