= John Hilton (industrial relations) =

John Hilton (1880–1943) was the first Montague Burton Professor of Industrial Relations at Cambridge University, broadcaster and journalist.

== Life ==
John Hilton was born in Lancashire. After serving an apprenticeship as a mill mechanic, he worked as foreman and manager of engineering works before spending the period 1907-08 studying in Russia.

After four years of lecturing and technical journalism, he became in 1912 the acting secretary of the Garton Foundation, newly established to propagate Norman Angell's ideas on international relations. In 1919 he joined the Ministry of Labour as Assistant Secretary and Director of Statistics.

In 1931 he took up the newly established position of Professor of Industrial Relations at the Cambridge University. In this period he made weekly broadcasts called This and that (1934–36) and This way out (1936–37), and wrote weekly articles and daily questions-and-answers in the News Chronicle (1936–39).

On the outbreak of the World War II he became in September 1939 Director of Home Publicity at the Ministry of Information, but stood down in the following June and resumed broadcasting, with John Hilton talking, speaking largely to those affected directly and personally by the war, those in the Forces, those left behind and those subject to industrial conscription.

He was approached in March 1942 by the News of the World to do the same sort of thing for the newspaper. So he became Director of the News of the World Industrial Advice Bureau which, after his death in August 1943, was renamed after him. Based in Cambridge the Bureau called on a panel drawn from dozens of professions with expertise to deal with readers' queries. It continued in peacetime until 1968, particularly addressing the public's concerns in their dealings with the Welfare State.

== Selected publications ==
- Chisholm, Hugh, ed. (1922). "Strikes and Lock-outs" . Encyclopædia Britannica (12th ed.). London & New York: The Encyclopædia Britannica Company. (sections on United Kingdom, Foreign Countries and British Dominions)
- Industrial Relations Inaugural Lecture, Cambridge University Press, 1931
- This and That: the broadcast talks of John Hilton, George Allen & Unwin Ltd, London, 1938

== References and sources ==
Sources

- John Hilton, The Story of his Life, by Edna Nixon, George Allen & Unwin Ltd, London, 1946
