= Mary Fowler (geophysicist) =

British geophysicist and academic

Mary Fowler FRAS FGS FRCGS
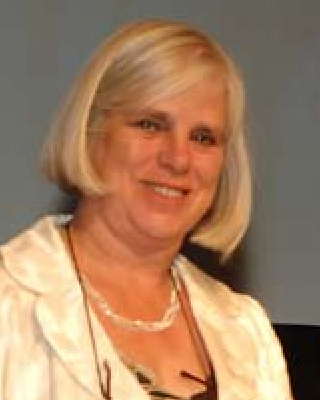
- Fowler in 2008

Master of Darwin College, Cambridge
- In office October 2012 – September 2020
- Preceded by: William Brown
- Succeeded by: Mike Rands

Personal details
- Born: Christine Mary Rutherford Fowler; 1950 (age 75–76)
- Citizenship: United Kingdom
- Spouse: Euan Nisbet (m. 1975)
- Children: Three
- Awards: Prestwich Medal of the Geological Society of London (1996)

Academic background
- Education: Girton College, Cambridge; Darwin College, Cambridge
- Thesis: Seismic Studies of the Mid-Atlantic Ridge (1976)

Academic work
- Discipline: Geophysics
- Institutions: ETH Zürich; University of Saskatchewan; Royal Holloway, University of London; Darwin College, Cambridge

Christine Mary Rutherford Fowler, FRAS, FGS, FRCGS (born 1950) is a British geophysicist and academic. From 2012 to 2020, she served as the Master of Darwin College, Cambridge. She was previously a lecturer at Royal Holloway, University of London, rising to become Dean of its Faculty of Science.

== Early life and education ==
Fowler was born in 1950 to Rosemary and Peter Fowler. She comes from a family of eminent scientists. A great-grandfather was Ernest Rutherford, the 'father of nuclear physics', her grandfather, Rutherford's son-in-law, was the mathematical physicist Ralph H. Fowler, and her mother Rosemary discovered the kaon, or K meson particle, in 1948.

She studied mathematics at Girton College, Cambridge, graduating with a first class Bachelor of Arts (BA) degree in 1972. In 1972 she joined Darwin College, Cambridge to undertake post-graduate studies in geophysics, completing her Doctor of Philosophy (PhD) degree in 1976. Her doctoral thesis was titled "Seismic Studies of the Mid-Atlantic Ridge".

== Academic career ==
From 1977 to 1978, Fowler was a Royal Society European Fellow at ETH Zürich in Switzerland. She joined the University of Saskatchewan in Canada as a research associate in 1981. She was an assistant professor from 1982 to 1983, before returning to her research associate position. She remained associated with the university as an adjunct professor between 1991 and 2001.

In 1992, Fowler joined Royal Holloway, University of London as a lecturer; she was later promoted to senior lecturer. Between 2002 and 2008, she was head of the Department of Earth Sciences. She was made Professor of Geophysics in 2003. In 2011, she was appointed Dean of the Faculty of Science.

In April 2012, it was announced that Fowler had been elected the sixth Master of Darwin College, Cambridge. She took up the appointment in October 2012, succeeding William Brown. She retired in 2020 and was succeeded by Dr Michael Rands.

== Personal life ==
In 1975, Fowler married Euan Nisbet, now a professor of Earth Sciences at Royal Holloway. They met at Darwin College, Cambridge while students. Together, they have three children: two daughters and a son. Their daughter (Ruth) Ellen Nisbet, who is a biochemist and academic, also studied at Darwin College, Cambridge.

== Honours ==
In 1996, Fowler was awarded the Prestwich Medal by the Geological Society of London. She is a Fellow of the Royal Astronomical Society (FRAS), a Fellow of the Geological Society of London (FGS), and a Fellow of the Royal Canadian Geographical Society (FRCGS). In July 2018, Fowler was awarded an honorary Doctor of Science (DSc) by the University of Leeds, and by the University of Edinburgh.

== Selected works ==
- Fowler, C. M. R. (1990). The Solid Earth: An Introduction to Global Geophysics (1st ed.). Cambridge: Cambridge University Press. ISBN 978-0521370257.
- Fowler, C. M. R.; Ebinger, C. J.; Hawkesworth, C. J., eds. (2002). The Early Earth: Physical, Chemical and Biological Development. London: Geological Society of London. ISBN 978-1862391093.
- Fowler, C. M. R. (2005). The Solid Earth: An Introduction to Global Geophysics (2nd ed.). Cambridge: Cambridge University Press. ISBN 978-0521584098.

Academic offices
Preceded by William Brown	Master of Darwin College, Cambridge; 2012-2020	Succeeded by Michael Rands
