= Montague Burton Professor of Industrial Relations =

Professorship at the University of Cambridge

The Montague Burton Professorships of Industrial Relations are three professorships in industrial relations at the University of Cambridge, Cardiff University and the University of Leeds. The professorships were established between 1929–30 and endowed by Sir Montague Maurice Burton, founder of Burton Menswear.

== Cambridge ==
The Cambridge professorship was established on 14 November 1930. It is assigned to the Faculty of Economics.

=== List of Montague Burton Professors at Cambridge ===
- 1931–1943 John Hilton
- 1944–1963 Harold Stewart Kirkaldy
- 1964–1983 Herbert Arthur Frederick Turner
- 1985–2012 William Arthur Brown
- 2013– Coenraad Nicolaas Teulings

== Cardiff ==
=== List of Montague Burton Professors at Cardiff ===
- 1951–66 Michael Patrick Fogarty
- 1969–89 George Thomason

== Leeds ==
=== List of Montague Burton Professors at Leeds ===
- 1930-55 John Henry Richardson
- 1961–63 Herbert Arthur Frederick Turner
- 1968-89 Rodney Crossley
- 1990–2012 Peter Nolan
- 2012– Mark Stuart
