= All the Way from Memphis (radio show) =

- Genre: Pop music quiz
- Running time: 30 minutes
- Country of origin: United Kingdom
- Language: English
- Home station: BBC Radio 4
- Starring: James Walton (host), Tracey MacLeod, Andrew Collins
- Produced by: Dawn Ellis
- No. of episodes: 12
- Opening theme: "All the Way from Memphis"
- Website: All the Way from Memphis

All the Way from Memphis is a radio programme that aired from December 2004 to June 2006. There were 12 half-hour episodes and it was broadcast on BBC Radio 4. It was compiled, written and presented by James Walton, with team captains Tracey MacLeod, and Andrew Collins. Readings are by Beth Chalmers.

It was a pop music based quiz, with a similar format to Walton's The Write Stuff.

Since 2007, it was being repeated a number of times on BBC Radio 7 (now BBC Radio 4 Extra).

The following is a list of episodes, guest panellists and the broadcast details:

== Key ==
– Game won by Tracey's team.

– Game won by Andrew's team.

– Game tied.

=== Series 1 ===
Episode	Broadcast	Tracey's guest	Andrew's guest
1	8 December 2004	Stewart Lee	Martin Freeman
2	15 December 2004	David Hepworth	Carol Decker
3	22 December 2004	Richard Curtis	Tony Wilson
4	29 December 2004	Stewart Lee	Martin Freeman
5	5 January 2005	David Hepworth	Carol Decker
6	12 January 2005	Richard Curtis	Tony Wilson

=== Series 2 ===
Episode	Broadcast	Tracey's guest	Andrew's guest
1	17 May 2006	Dave Gorman	Mary Anne Hobbs
2	24 May 2006	David Quantick	Stewart Lee
3	31 May 2006	Danny Kelly	Clare Grogan
4	7 June 2006	Dave Gorman	Mary Anne Hobbs
5	14 June 2006	David Quantick	Stewart Lee
6	21 June 2006	Danny Kelly	Clare Grogan
