= Harry Ritchie =

Scottish writer and journalist

Harry Ritchie (born 1958) is a Scottish writer and journalist. He is the author of six books, and numerous newspaper articles and book reviews.

== Biography ==
Ritchie was born in Kirkcaldy, Fife. He attended Kirkcaldy High School and the University of Edinburgh, then studied for a D.Phil. at Lincoln College, Oxford. His doctoral thesis on the literary scene of the 1950s was published by Faber as the book Success Stories in 1988. His subsequent works are the comic travel books Here We Go and The Last Pink Bits, the novels Friday Night Club and The Third Party, and a book about English grammar, English for the Natives (John Murray).

Ritchie edited the anthology New Scottish Writing, and contributed an essay to Nick Hornby's anthology of football writing, My Favourite Year, about his lifelong passion for Raith Rovers, his hometown football club.

His first job in journalism was as a sub-editor on Harpers & Queen magazine in 1987. A year later, he succeeded Nigella Lawson as deputy literary editor of The Sunday Times. He was the Sunday Times' literary editor from 1993 until his resignation in 1995. Since then, he has worked as a freelance, writing for various national newspapers and magazines. He has also taught writing skills to postgraduate students at King's College London and Glasgow Caledonian University, where he has also been a visiting professor.

Ritchie lives in London with the journalist and broadcaster Tracey MacLeod.
