= Christmas University Challenge =

British quiz programme

- Genre: Quiz show
- Presented by: Jeremy Paxman (2011–2022); Amol Rajan (2023–)
- Country of origin: United Kingdom
- Original language: English
- No. of series: 15
- No. of episodes: 147

Production
- Production locations: Granada Studios (2011–2012); MediaCityUK (2013–)
- Running time: 30 minutes
- Production company: Granada Television

Original release
- Network: BBC Two
- Release: 19 December 2011 – present

Related
- University Challenge

Christmas University Challenge is a British quiz programme which has aired on BBC Two since 19 December 2011. It is a spin-off from University Challenge and airs daily over the Christmas period. It features teams of noteworthy alumni from British universities competing in the same format as the parent show.

Amol Rajan replaced Jeremy Paxman as host from December 2023. The current holders are Durham University.

== Series overview ==
Series	Episodes	Originally released	
Series	Episodes	First released	Last released
1	8	19 December 2011	27 December 2011
2	10	17 December 2012	4 January 2013
3	10	20 December 2013	3 January 2014
4	10	20 December 2014	2 January 2015
5	10	20 December 2015	1 January 2016
6	10	19 December 2016	29 December 2016
7	10	24 December 2017	5 January 2018
8	10	24 December 2018	4 January 2019
9	10	23 December 2019	3 January 2020
10	10	21 December 2020	1 January 2021
11	10	20 December 2021	31 December 2021
12	10	19 December 2022	30 December 2022
13	9	18 December 2023	29 December 2023
14	10	23 December 2024	3 January 2025
15	10	22 December 2025	2 January 2026

== Series results ==
=== Key ===
- Winning teams are highlighted in **bold**.
- Teams with green scores (winners) returned in the next round, while those with red scores (losers) were eliminated.
- Teams with orange scores won their match but did not achieve a high enough score to proceed to the next round.
- A score in italics indicates a match decided on a tie-breaker question.

=== 2011 results ===
First Round

Team 1	Score		Team 2	Total	Broadcast date
University of York	120	125	**University of Manchester**	245	19 December 2011
Durham University	60	135	**University of Edinburgh**	195	20 December 2011
**Magdalen College, Oxford**	130	85	University College London	215	21 December 2011
**University of Warwick**	225	50	University of Sheffield	275	22 December 2011
**Trinity College, Cambridge**	225	80	University of St Andrews	305	24 December 2011

Semi-finals

Team 1	Score		Team 2	Total	Broadcast date
University of Edinburgh	35	265	**University of Warwick**	300	25 December 2011
Magdalen College, Oxford	105	160	**Trinity College, Cambridge**	265	26 December 2011

Final

Team 1	Score		Team 2	Total	Broadcast date
University of Warwick	60	235	**Trinity College, Cambridge**	280	27 December 2011

The 2011 series was won by Trinity College, Cambridge whose team of Robin Bhattacharyya, Daisy Goodwin, John Lloyd, and Edward Stourton beat the University of Warwick's team of Vadim Jean, Daisy Christodoulou, Christian Wolmar and Carla Mendonça.

=== 2012 results ===
First Round

Team 1	Score		Team 2	Total	Broadcast date
University of Bristol	135	140	**University of Leeds**	275	17 December 2012
**Newcastle University**	120	110	Loughborough University	230	18 December 2012
**New College, Oxford**	240	160	London School of Economics	400	19 December 2012
**University of Liverpool**	165	140	Cardiff University	305	20 December 2012
**Newnham College, Cambridge**	155	110	University of Nottingham	265	21 December 2012
University of Exeter	125	165	**University of Glasgow**	290	31 December 2012
University of Birmingham	115	195	**University of East Anglia**	310	1 January 2013

Semi-finals

Team 1	Score		Team 2	Total	Broadcast date
**New College, Oxford**	220	125	University of Liverpool	345	2 January 2013
University of Glasgow	115	150	**University of East Anglia**	265	3 January 2013

Final

Team 1	Score		Team 2	Total	Broadcast date
**New College, Oxford**	205	110	University of East Anglia	315	4 January 2013

The 2012 series was won by New College, Oxford whose team of Rachel Johnson, Patrick Gale, Kate Mosse and Yan Wong beat the University of East Anglia's team of John Boyne, Razia Iqbal, David Grossman and Charlie Higson.

=== 2013 results ===
First Round

Team 1	Score		Team 2	Total	Broadcast date
University of Reading	85	185	**Emmanuel College, Cambridge**	270	20 December 2013
University of Kent	100	160	**Lancaster University**	260	21 December 2013
**Keele University**	140	95	Aberystwyth University	235	23 December 2013
**Gonville and Caius College, Cambridge**	255	65	Christ Church, Oxford	320	26 December 2013
**St Hugh's College, Oxford**	125	95	University of Stirling	220	27 December 2013
**University of Leicester**	125	60	University of Sussex	185	30 December 2013
King's College London	105	185	**University of Southampton**	290	31 December 2013

Semi-finals

Team 1	Score		Team 2	Total	Broadcast date
**Emmanuel College, Cambridge**	185	105	University of Southampton	290	1 January 2014
Lancaster University	145	180	**Gonville and Caius College, Cambridge**	325	2 January 2014

Final

Team 1	Score		Team 2	Total	Broadcast date
Emmanuel College, Cambridge	140	175	**Gonville and Caius College, Cambridge**	315	3 January 2014

The 2013 series was won by Gonville and Caius College, Cambridge whose team of Quentin Stafford-Fraser, Helen Castor, Mark Damazer and Lars Tharp beat Emmanuel College, Cambridge and their team of Hugo Rifkind, Mary-Ann Ochota, Simon Singh and Rory McGrath.

=== 2014 results ===
First Round

Team 1	Score		Team 2	Total	Broadcast date
Lady Margaret Hall, Oxford	195	45	University of Warwick	240	20 December 2014
University of Hull	205	25	Newcastle University	230	23 December 2014
King's College, Cambridge	160	150	Royal Holloway, University of London	310	24 December 2014
University of Edinburgh	235	45	University of Leeds	280	25 December 2014
Trinity Hall, Cambridge	195	120	Balliol College, Oxford	315	26 December 2014
University of York	135	110	University of Surrey	245	29 December 2014
Manchester Metropolitan University	145	75	Goldsmiths, University of London	220	30 December 2014

Semi-finals

Team 1	Score		Team 2	Total	Broadcast date
Lady Margaret Hall, Oxford	145	175	**University of Hull**	320	31 December 2014
University of Edinburgh	135	165	**Trinity Hall, Cambridge**	300	1 January 2015

Final

Team 1	Score		Team 2	Total	Broadcast date
University of Hull	65	215	**Trinity Hall, Cambridge**	280	2 January 2015

The 2014 series was won by Trinity Hall, Cambridge whose team of Tom James, Emma Pooley, Adam Mars-Jones and Dan Starkey beat the University of Hull and their team of Rosie Millard, Malcolm Sinclair, Jenni Murray and Stan Cullimore.

=== 2015 results ===
First Round

Team 1	Score		Team 2	Total	Broadcast date
**University College London**	155	80	University of Birmingham	235	20 December 2015
Oriel College, Oxford	135	140	**Trinity College, Cambridge**	275	21 December 2015
**University of Manchester**	195	35	University of East Anglia	230	22 December 2015
Christ's College, Cambridge	90	140	**University of Essex**	230	23 December 2015
University of Exeter	130	220	**Magdalen College, Oxford**	350	24 December 2015
University of Aberdeen	90	185	**University of Sheffield**	275	28 December 2015
**Durham University**	140	130	London School of Economics	270	29 December 2015

Semi-finals

Team 1	Score		Team 2	Total	Broadcast date
University of Manchester	105	160	**University of Sheffield**	265	30 December 2015
University College London	100	195	**Magdalen College, Oxford**	295	31 December 2015

Final

Team 1	Score		Team 2	Total	Broadcast date
University of Sheffield	60	230	**Magdalen College, Oxford**	290	1 January 2016

The 2015 series was won by Magdalen College, Oxford whose team of Robin Lane Fox, Heather Berlin, Louis Theroux and Matt Ridley beat the University of Sheffield and their team of Sid Lowe, Nicci Gerrard, Adam Hart and Ruth Reed.

=== 2016 results ===
First Round

Team 1	Score		Team 2	Total	Broadcast date
University of Manchester	55	185	**St Anne's College, Oxford**	240	19 December 2016
**University of Kent**	245	35	University of Sussex	280	20 December 2016
**City, University of London**	145	35	Newcastle University	180	21 December 2016
SOAS University of London	85	175	**University of Leeds**	260	22 December 2016
**University of Edinburgh**	115	60	St Catharine's College, Cambridge	175	23 December 2016
Magdalene College, Cambridge	65	225	**St Hilda's College, Oxford**	290	25 December 2016
University of Bristol	70	75	**University of Nottingham**	145	26 December 2016

Semi-finals

Team 1	Score		Team 2	Total	Broadcast date
University of Kent	130	140	**University of Leeds**	270	27 December 2016
St Anne's College, Oxford	75	165	**St Hilda's College, Oxford**	240	28 December 2016

Final

Team 1	Score		Team 2	Total	Broadcast date
University of Leeds	55	160	**St Hilda's College, Oxford**	215	29 December 2016

The 2016 series was won by St Hilda's College, Oxford whose team of Fiona Caldicott, Daisy Dunn, Val McDermid and Adèle Geras beat the University of Leeds and their team of Louise Doughty, Gus Unger-Hamilton, Kamal Ahmed and Steve Bell.

=== 2017 results ===
First Round

Team 1	Score		Team 2	Total	Broadcast date
Durham University	35	220	**Keble College, Oxford**	255	24 December 2017
**Selwyn College, Cambridge**	145	90	University of St Andrews	235	26 December 2017
York University	70	150	**University of Southampton**	220	27 December 2017
University of Leicester	45	175	**University College London**	220	28 December 2017
**St John's College, Cambridge**	155	40	St Edmund Hall, Oxford	195	29 December 2017
**Queen Mary University of London**	110	60	Cardiff University	170	1 January 2018
Brunel University London	45	155	**University of Reading**	200	2 January 2018

Semi-finals

Team 1	Score		Team 2	Total	Broadcast date
**Keble College, Oxford**	160	105	St John's College, Cambridge	265	3 January 2018
University College London	125	130	**University of Reading**	255	4 January 2018

Final

Team 1	Score		Team 2	Total	Broadcast date
**Keble College, Oxford**	240	0	University of Reading	240	5 January 2018

The 2017 series was won by Keble College, Oxford whose team of Paul Johnson, Frank Cottrell-Boyce, Katy Brand and Anne-Marie Imafidon beat the University of Reading and their team of Anna Machin, Martin Hughes-Games, Sophie Walker and Pippa Greenwood.

=== 2018 results ===
First Round

Team 1	Score		Team 2	Total	Broadcast date
Brasenose College, Oxford	100	150	**University of Bristol**	250	24 December 2018
**University of Westminster**	130	100	University of East Anglia	230	25 December 2018
Pembroke College, Cambridge	85	150	**King's College London**	235	26 December 2018
St Catherine's College, Oxford	130	135	**Peterhouse, Cambridge**	265	27 December 2018
**University of Exeter**	110	85	University of Birmingham	195	28 December 2018
University of Sheffield	90	115	**University of Manchester**	205	31 December 2018
University of Edinburgh	120	160	**London School of Economics**	280	1 January 2019

Semi-finals

Team 1	Score		Team 2	Total	Broadcast date
**University of Bristol**	205	100	King's College London	305	2 January 2019
**Peterhouse, Cambridge**	215	60	London School of Economics	275	3 January 2019

Final

Team 1	Score		Team 2	Total	Broadcast date
University of Bristol	125	190	**Peterhouse, Cambridge**	315	4 January 2019

The 2018 series was won by Peterhouse, Cambridge whose team of Dan Mazer, Mark Horton, Michael Howard and Michael Axworthy beat the University of Bristol and their team of Philip Ball, Laura Wade, Misha Glenny and Iain Stewart.

=== 2019 results ===
First Round

Team 1	Score		Team 2	Total	Broadcast date
**University of Leeds**	205	55	Clare College, Cambridge	260	23 December 2019
Birmingham City University	75	160	**Wadham College, Oxford**	235	24 December 2019
Guildhall School of Music and Drama	120	165	**University College London**	285	25 December 2019
University of Liverpool	75	150	**University of Hull**	225	26 December 2019
Royal Holloway, University of London	70	130	**University of Sussex**	200	27 December 2019
**Trinity Hall, Cambridge**	180	85	St Peter's College, Oxford	265	30 December 2019
University of Warwick	80	115	**Imperial College London**	195	31 December 2019

Semi-finals

Team 1	Score		Team 2	Total	Broadcast date
Trinity Hall, Cambridge	25	215	**Wadham College, Oxford**	240	1 January 2020
**University of Leeds**	205	45	University College London	250	2 January 2020

Final

Team 1	Score		Team 2	Total	Broadcast date
Wadham College, Oxford	130	235	**University of Leeds**	365	3 January 2020

The 2019 series was won by the University of Leeds whose team of Jonathan Clements, Henry Gee, Richard Coles and Timothy Allen beat Wadham College, Oxford and their team of Jonathan Freedland, Tom Solomon, Anne McElvoy and Roger Mosey.

=== 2020 results ===
First Round

Team 1	Score		Team 2	Total	Broadcast date
Christ's College, Cambridge	50	180	**St John's College, Oxford**	230	21 December 2020
**University of Manchester**	175	30	Queen's University Belfast	205	22 December 2020
**The Courtauld Institute of Art**	150	100	Goldsmiths, University of London	250	23 December 2020
**University of Nottingham**	145	70	University of Sheffield	215	24 December 2020
University of Central Lancashire	60	170	**Loughborough University**	230	26 December 2020
**Durham University**	90	65	Downing College, Cambridge	155	28 December 2020
**New College, Oxford**	110	60	University of Reading	170	29 December 2020

Semi-finals

Team 1	Score		Team 2	Total	Broadcast date
St John's College, Oxford	135	180	**The Courtauld Institute of Art**	315	30 December 2020
**University of Manchester**	140	70	Loughborough University	210	31 December 2020

Final

Team 1	Score		Team 2	Total	Broadcast date
**The Courtauld Institute of Art**	150	90	University of Manchester	240	1 January 2021

The 2020 series was won by The Courtauld Institute of Art whose team of Tim Marlow, Lavinia Greenlaw, Jacky Klein and Jeremy Deller beat the University of Manchester and their team of David Nott, Juliet Jacques, Adrian Edmondson and Justin Edwards.

=== 2021 results ===
First Round

Team 1	Score		Team 2	Total	Broadcast date
**University of Edinburgh**	160	125	University of Leicester	285	20 December 2021
University of Winchester	95	130	**University of Bradford**	225	21 December 2021
University of Bristol	95	125	**King's College, Cambridge**	220	22 December 2021
London School of Economics	75	130	**Hertford College, Oxford**	205	23 December 2021
Corpus Christi College, Cambridge	130	145	**St Anne's College, Oxford**	275	24 December 2021
**Birkbeck, University of London**	125	30	University of Portsmouth	155	27 December 2021
**University of Kent**	115	95	Goldsmiths, University of London	210	28 December 2021

Semi-finals

Team 1	Score		Team 2	Total	Broadcast date
**University of Edinburgh**	145	125	University of Bradford	270	29 December 2021
**Hertford College, Oxford**	155	95	St Anne's College, Oxford	250	30 December 2021

Final

Team 1	Score		Team 2	Total	Broadcast date
**University of Edinburgh**	235	95	Hertford College, Oxford	330	31 December 2021

The 2021 series was won by the University of Edinburgh whose team of Catherine Slessor, Thomasina Miers, Miles Jupp and Phil Swanson beat Hertford College, Oxford and their team of Soweto Kinch, Elizabeth Norton, Adam Fleming and Isabelle Westbury.

=== 2022 results ===
First Round

Team 1	Score		Team 2	Total	Broadcast date
SOAS University of London	75	155	**Balliol College, Oxford**	230	19 December 2022
University College, Oxford	75	110	**University of Glasgow**	195	20 December 2022
Durham University	45	200	**University of York**	245	21 December 2022
**Exeter College, Oxford**	150	70	Queen Mary University of London	220	22 December 2022
**University of Hull**	135	35	University of the West of England	170	23 December 2022
University College London	85	115	**University of Aberdeen**	200	26 December 2022
**University of Bristol**	125	105	Cardiff University	230	27 December 2022

Semi-finals

Team 1	Score		Team 2	Total	Broadcast date
University of York	100	155	**University of Hull**	255	28 December 2022
**Balliol College, Oxford**	215	125	Exeter College, Oxford	340	29 December 2022

Final

Team 1	Score		Team 2	Total	Broadcast date
University of Hull	70	165	**Balliol College, Oxford**	235	30 December 2022

The 2022 series was won by Balliol College, Oxford whose team of Elizabeth Kiss, Andrew Copson, Martin Edwards and Martin O'Neill beat the University of Hull and their team of Katharine Norbury, James Graham, (Note: As the opening weekend of Graham's musical Tammy Faye clashed with the recording of the Final, Sarah Peverley took his place.) Sian Reese-Williams and Graeme Hall. This was the last Christmas special to be hosted by Jeremy Paxman after 11 years.

=== 2023 results ===
There were only six first-round matches due to one episode being removed. This was after complaints were received from two contestants who felt their accessibility requirements were not met during filming. Neither the contestants nor their institution have been named, other than being colleges of Oxford and Cambridge. The rest of the series was broadcast as normal.

First Round

Team 1	Score		Team 2	Total	Broadcast date
**King's College London**	155	120	City, University of London	275	18 December 2023
**Royal Holloway, University of London**	170	95	University of East Anglia	265	19 December 2023
University of Dundee	75	185	**Bangor University**	260	20 December 2023
**Corpus Christi College, Oxford**	265	80	University of Edinburgh	345	21 December 2023
Imperial College London	110	80	University of Liverpool	190	22 December 2023
**Middlesex University**	175	115	University of Leeds	290	26 December 2023

Semi-finals

Team 1	Score		Team 2	Total	Broadcast date
Royal Holloway, University of London	160	180	**Corpus Christi College, Oxford**	340	27 December 2023
Bangor University	85	195	**Middlesex University**	280	28 December 2023

Final

Team 1	Score		Team 2	Total	Broadcast date
Corpus Christi College, Oxford	80	175	**Middlesex University**	255	29 December 2023

The winning Middlesex University team consisted of David Heathcote, Lola Young, Heather Phillipson (Note: Originally Dan Renton Skinner was the team captain, but he was unable to make the recordings of the semi-finals/final, so Heather Phillipson took over as captain, and David Heathcote took his place as a team member.) and David Hepworth, who beat Corpus Christi College, Oxford and their team of Francesca Happé, Michael Cockerell, Alex Bellos and Steve Waters.

=== 2024 results ===
Team 1	Score		Team 2	Total	Broadcast date
University of Warwick	35	265	**Durham University**	300	23 December 2024
**Worcester College, Oxford**	155	105	University of Bristol	260	24 December 2024
Manchester Metropolitan University	110	135	**University of Brighton**	245	26 December 2024
Leeds Trinity University	100	115	**University of Nottingham**	215	27 December 2024
University of Southampton	125	150	**Churchill College, Cambridge**	275	29 December 2024
Emmanuel College, Cambridge	95	175	**Queens' College, Cambridge**	270	30 December 2024
**University of St Andrews**	130	65	London School of Economics	195	31 December 2024

Semi-finals

Team 1	Score		Team 2	Total	Broadcast date
**Durham University**	120	85	Worcester College, Oxford	205	1 January 2025
Churchill College, Cambridge	95	105	**Queens' College, Cambridge**	200	2 January 2025

Final

Team 1	Score		Team 2	Total	Broadcast date
**Durham University**	125	120	Queens' College, Cambridge	245	3 January 2025

Snatching victory on the final starter-for-ten, the winning Durham University team consisted of Liz James, Tracey MacLeod, Carla Denyer, and Sophia Smith Galer, who beat the Queens' College, Cambridge team of John Zarnecki, Stephanie Merritt, Jenny Kleeman and Richard K. Morgan.

=== 2025 results ===
For the 2025 series, to mark the fifteenth anniversary of the Christmas edition of the programme, one team from each prior series was invited back for another attempt.

Team 1	Score		Team 2	Total	Broadcast date
**Durham University**	200	140	University of Manchester	340	22 December 2025
**University College London**	235	70	University of Leeds	305	23 December 2025
**Keble College, Oxford**	275	85	University of Hull	360	24 December 2025
University of Bristol	55	260	**Trinity College, Cambridge**	315	26 December 2025
**Exeter College, Oxford**	150	145	Trinity Hall, Cambridge	295	28 December 2025
St Hilda's College, Oxford	130	185	**University of Edinburgh**	315	29 December 2025
Middlesex University	80	160	**University of Lancaster**	240	30 December 2025

Semi-finals

Team 1	Score		Team 2	Total	Broadcast date
University College London	115	170	**Keble College, Oxford**	285	31 December 2025
**Durham University**	185	125	Trinity College, Cambridge	310	1 January 2026

Final

Team 1	Score		Team 2	Total	Broadcast date
Keble College, Oxford	115	165	**Durham University**	280	2 January 2026

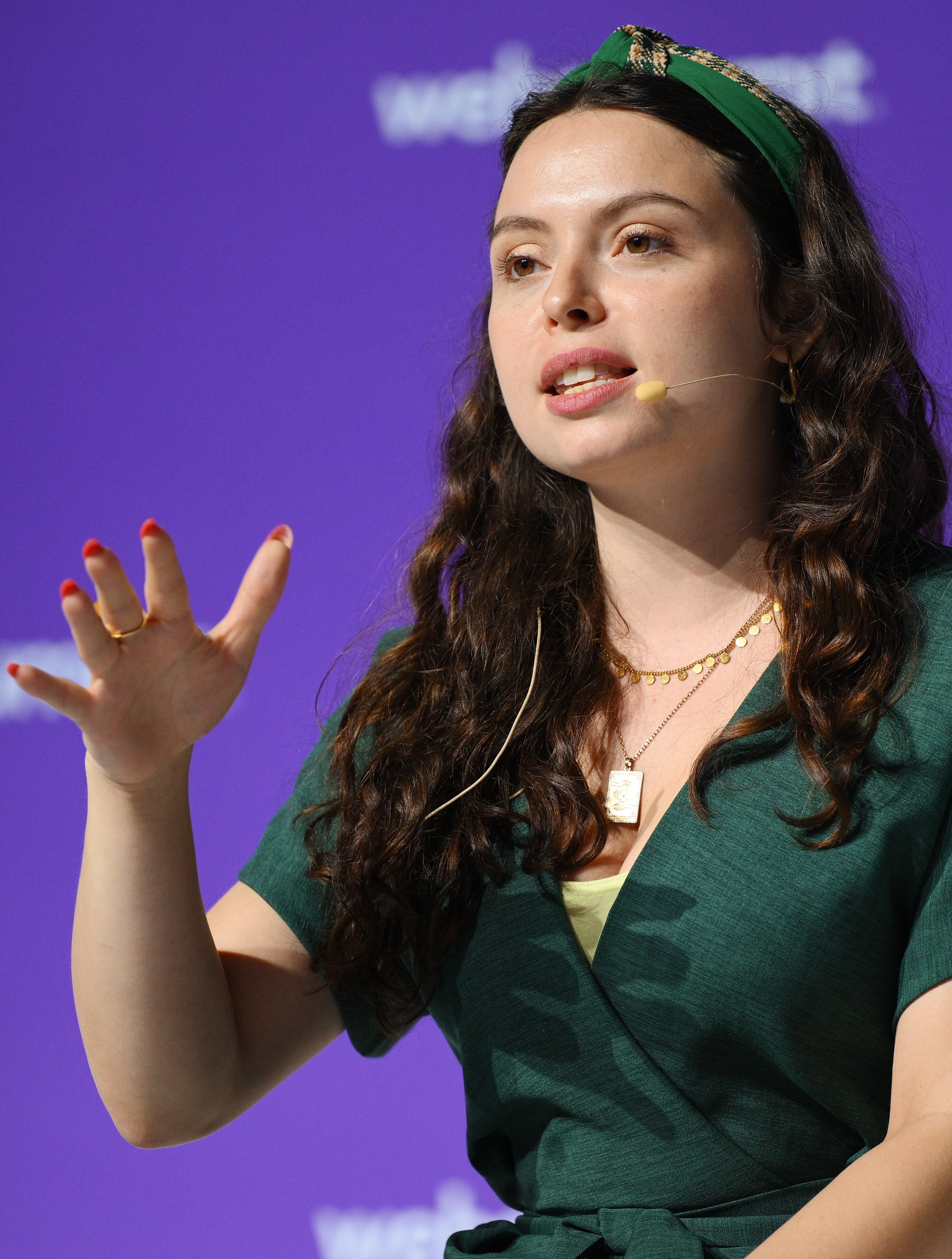
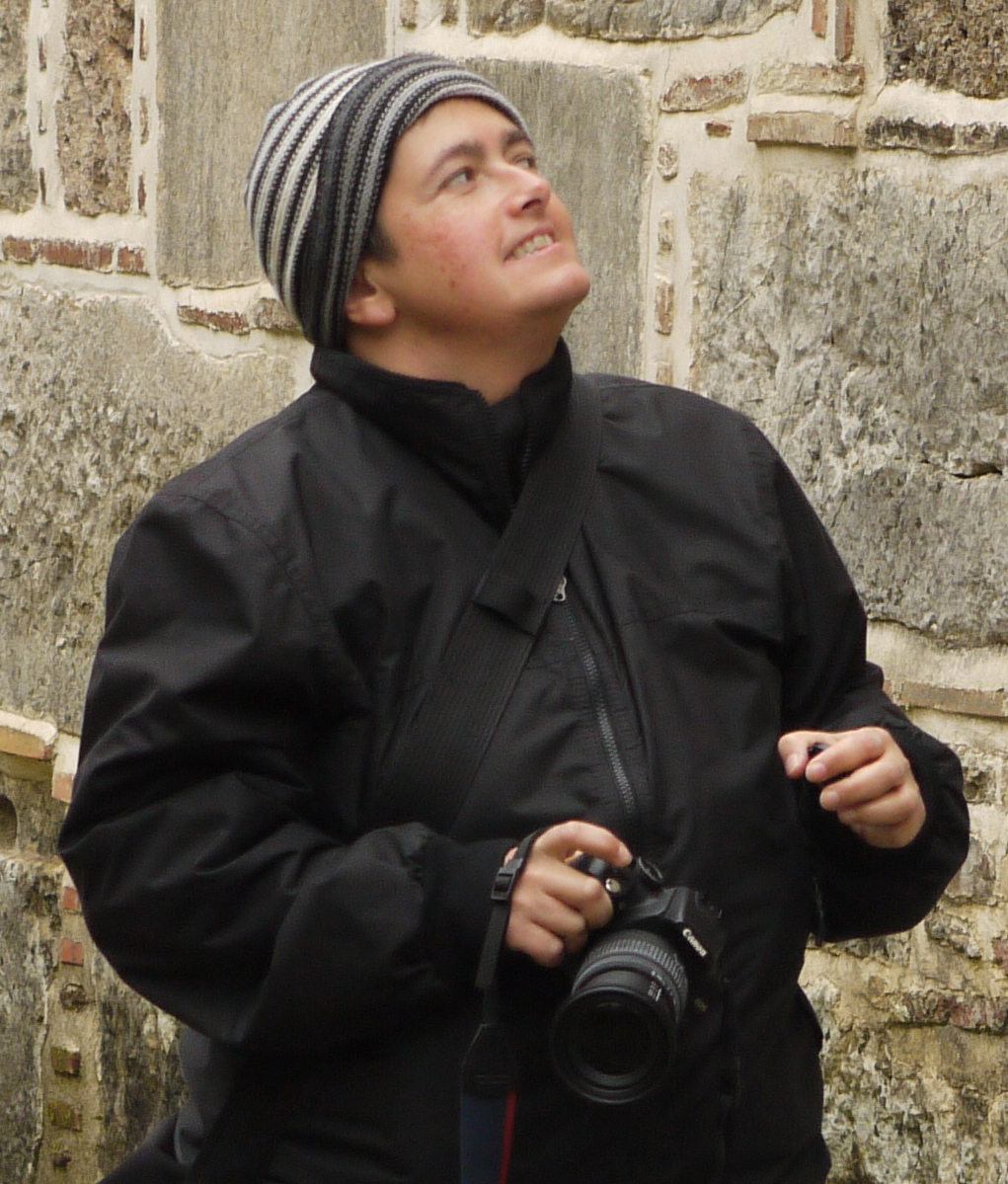
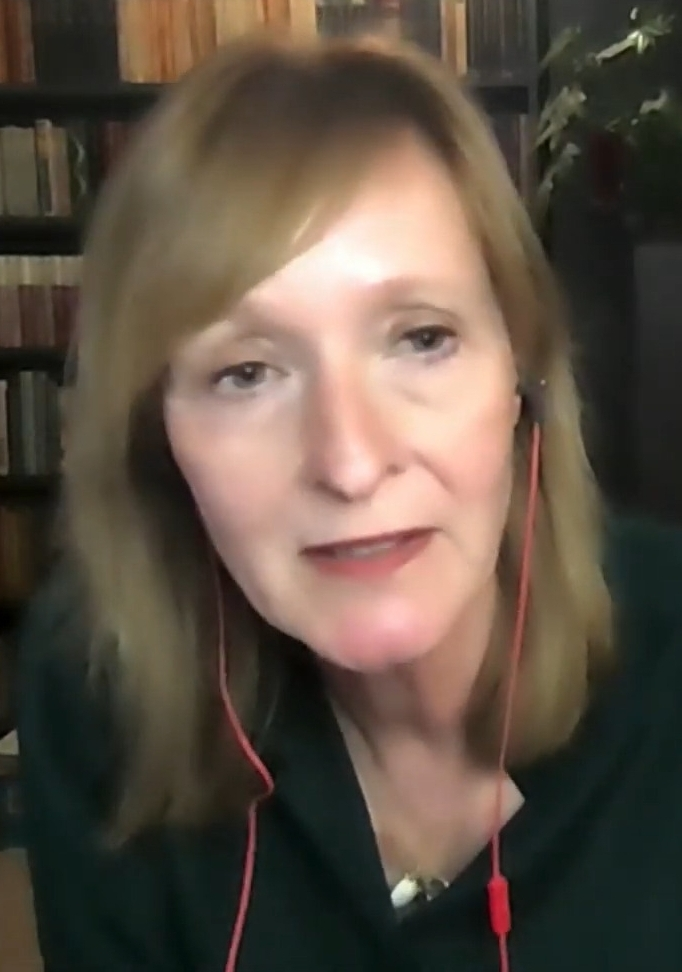
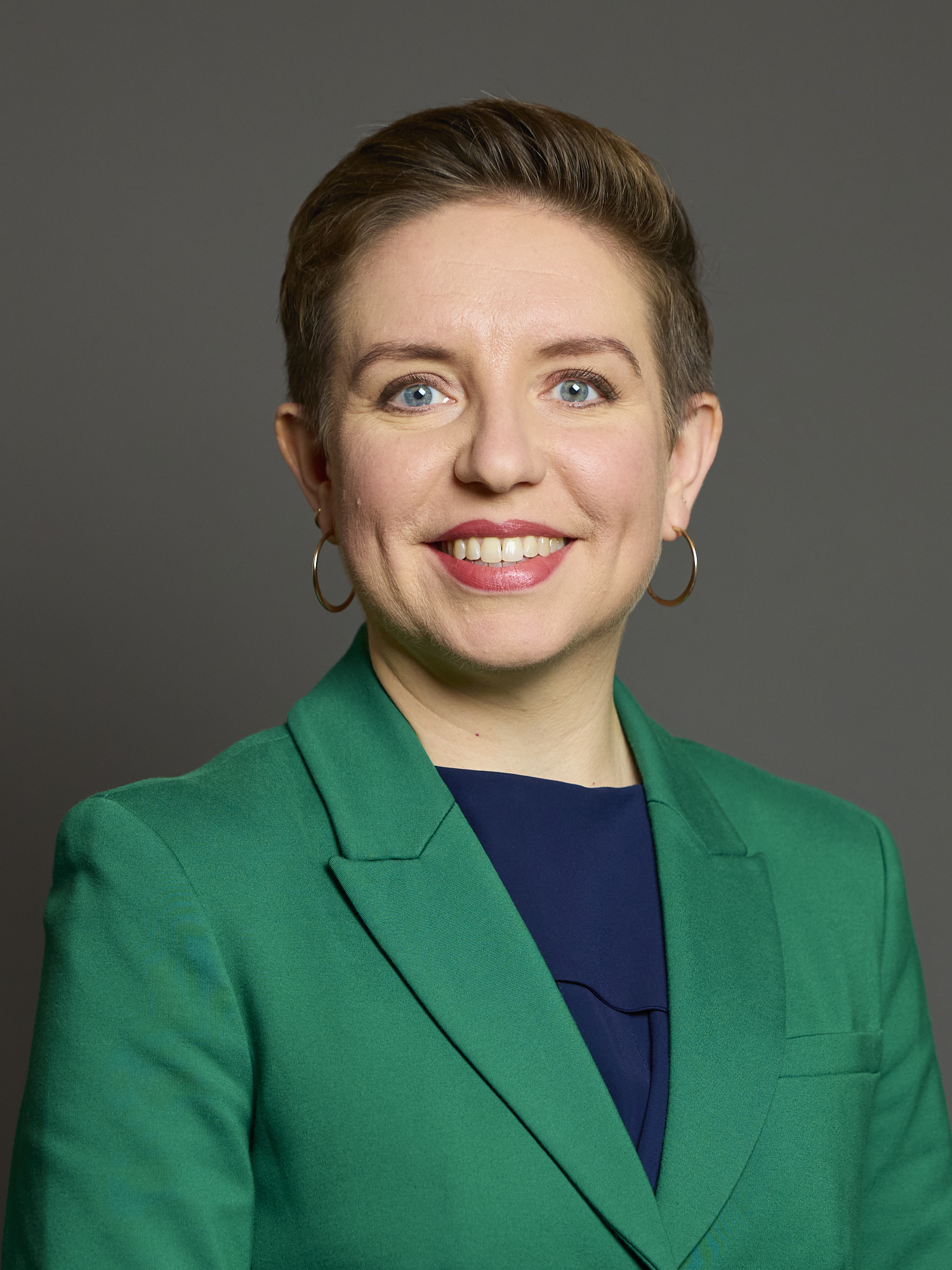
Sophia Smith Galer, Liz James, Tracey MacLeod, and Carla Denyer have won the past two series together as Team Durham University.

Taking the honours for the second year in a row, the winning Durham University team consisted of Liz James, Tracey MacLeod, Carla Denyer, and Sophia Smith Galer, who beat the Keble College, Oxford team of Paul Johnson, Frank Cottrell-Boyce, Anne-Marie Imafidon and Caroline Criado Perez.
