= Sophia Smith Galer =

British digital journalist (born 1994)

Sophia Smith Galer FRSA
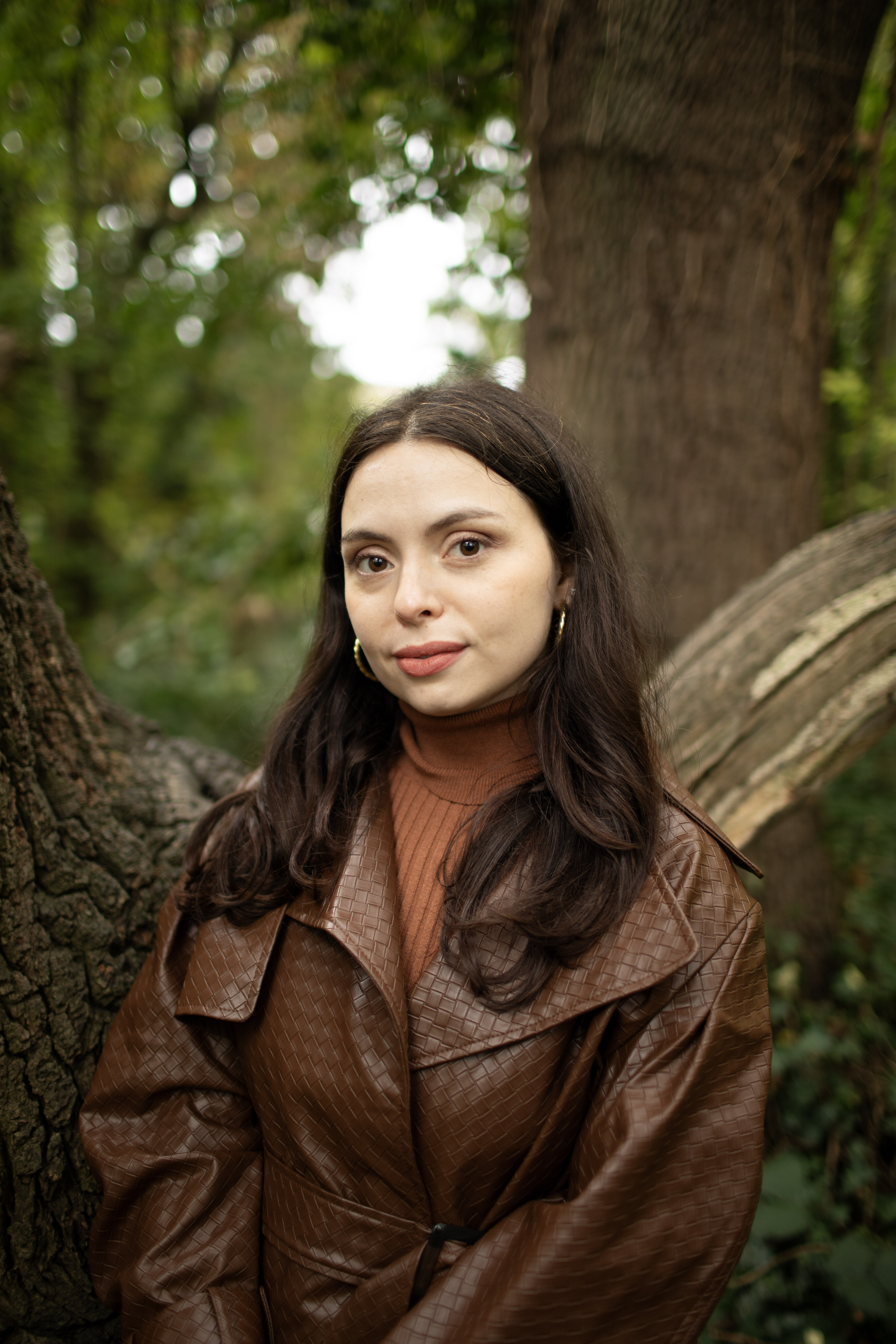
- Author-released portrait, October 2025
- Born: 1 June 1994 (age 32)
- Education: St Mary's College, Durham; City, University of London
- Occupations: Digital journalist; author; social media influencer
- Years active: 2019–present
- Partner: Luke Jones (m. 2025)

TikTok information
- Page: Sophia Smith Galer
- Followers: 589.9K
- Last updated: 19 June 2026
- Website: www.sophiasmithgaler.com

Sophia Smith Galer (born 1 June 1994) is a British digital journalist, author, and TikTok influencer. In 2022, she was named as one of Forbes 30 Under 30 for Marketing and Media in Europe, and short-listed on British Vogue's list of Top 25 Most Influential Women in the UK. In 2024 and 2025, Smith Galer won Christmas University Challenge for two consecutive years, alongside Liz James, Tracey MacLeod, and Carla Denyer.

== Early life and education ==
Smith Galer was born to an English father and a mother of Italian origin. Her maternal grandmother immigrated to Holloway, London from Piacenza in Italy. She was raised Catholic by her mother and grew up singing at St Peter's Italian Church in Clerkenwell, London. Her father was a divorcé when he met her mother and when they married she could no longer receive communion from her local church, Church of the Immaculate Conception, Farm Street. Smith Galer attended St Albans High School for Girls, a selective private day school. She went to St Mary's College at Durham University, from where she graduated with a degree in Spanish and Arabic in 2016, before studying for a Master's degree in Broadcast Journalism at City, University of London.

== Career ==
Smith Galer began her journalism career in May 2017 as a social media producer for BBC.com, and later became a visual journalist covering faith and ethics at BBC World Service.

In 2019, she started posting to short-form video-sharing app TikTok, becoming one of the first BBC journalists to do so, despite her employers not agreeing with her posting journalism content. She uses the platform to take part in trends, receive and gather news, and post explainer content, covering gender, sexual and reproductive health and rights, and digital culture.

In March 2021, Smith Galer posted an informative original sea shanty explaining how a container ship obstructed the Suez Canal, which went viral, amassing one million views in over eight hours. In June 2021, it was announced that she was leaving the BBC. Three months later, she joined VICE World News as a Senior News Reporter. She stayed in the role for two years until her departure in September 2023, becoming a freelance journalist.

Chris Stokel-Walker of The Observer named her as one "of the biggest ex-BBC names" on TikTok. Matthew Leake from The Reuters Institute for the Study of Journalism described her as "an authority on how journalists and news organisations can use TikTok to research stories, reach younger audiences and build relationships." Smith Galer adapts journalistic information to TikTok. In 2023, journalism and mass communication researchers Craig and Yetter treated Galer's work as a case study for journalistic ethics in digital space.

Smith Galer released her first book Losing It: Sex Education for the 21st Century in 2022 which advocated for improvements in sex education.

In February 2023, Smith Galer joined Brown University's Information Futures Lab as one of their inaugural fellows to address information disorders and digital literacy. In 2024, she co-hosted the BBC World Service podcast Where To Be A Woman with Scaachi Koul.

In 2024, Smith Galer won the Georgina Henry Award for digital innovation from Women in Journalism for an AI-enabled tool that helped journalists script video content. At the Media Freedom Awards, the judges called it "an exciting innovation in an important new journalistic field. Not only does it explore the commercial benefits of AI, this eponymous innovation is also dedicated to combating disinformation." In June 2025, she launched the tool as an iOS app called Sophiana through her digital consultancy Viralect. It is based on GPT-4o and has script-writing and teleprompter functions and was developed as part of the International Centre For Journalists' Disarming Disinformation Solutions Challenge. Joshua Benton at Nieman Lab wrote that a script he trialled with the app was "pretty solid work" and Alan Rusbridger said on Prospect's Media Confidential podcast that the app "couldn't be simpler".

Smith Galer released her second book How to Kill a Language: Power, Resistance and the Race to Save Our Words in 2026, which advocates defending linguistic diversity.

== Personal life ==
Smith Galer was raised Catholic. She married media relations specialist Luke Jones on 18 October 2025 at her childhood church, St Peter's Italian Church in London.

== Filmography ==
=== Television ===
Year	Title	Role	Notes	Ref(s)
2024	Christmas University Challenge	Contestant	Heat: "Warwick v. Durham"	
2025	Christmas University Challenge	Semi-Finalist	Semi-Final: "Durham v. Worcester College, Oxford"	
2025	Christmas University Challenge	Series 14 Winner (Note: As part of Durham University, alongside teammates Liz James, Tracey MacLeod, and Carla Denyer.)	Final: "Durham v. Queens' College, Cambridge"	
2025	Christmas University Challenge	Contestant	Heat: "Durham v. Manchester"	
2026	Christmas University Challenge	Semi-Finalist	Semi-Final: "Durham v. Trinity College, Cambridge"	
2026	Christmas University Challenge	Series 15 Winner	Final: "Durham v. Keble College, Oxford"	

== Books ==
- Losing It: Sex Education for the 21st Century, 2022. ISBN 9780008475581
- How to Kill a Language: Power, Resistance and the Race to Save Our Words, 2026. ISBN 978-0-00-872372-9
- Eatymology, 2027. ISBN 9781846016868

== Awards and recognition ==
- TikTok
  - Voices of Change (2020) – TikTok 100
  - Change Makers Program (2025) – Global 50
- British Journalism Awards
  - Innovation of the Year (2021) – TikTok Usage
- Forbes
  - 30 Under 30 (2022) – Media and Marketing in Europe
- British Vogue
  - One of the UK's Top 25 Most Influential Women (2022)
- Society of Editors' Media Freedom Awards
  - Georgina Henry Award for Digital Innovation (2024)
