= A Stab in the Dark (TV series) =

British television programme

A promotional image, showing Baddiel (l) and Gove (r).

A Stab in the Dark is a British television programme of topical monologues and discussion screened on Channel 4 in 1992, shortly after Channel 4 axed the similarly titled (but unrelated) After Dark. The series ran from 5 June until 7 August 1992.

It was hosted by comedian David Baddiel, television presenter Tracey MacLeod and journalist and critic Michael Gove, later a Conservative MP and minister.

The monologues, often containing very dark humour, were delivered straight to camera by each host in turn before a small studio audience on a stark set with numerous staircases. Sometimes relevant guests were invited on, including Conservative MPs Jerry Hayes and Alan Clark. Contributions were also made by Richard Herring. One of the writers on the show was Stewart Lee. A segment was included where Gove examined the rubbish bins of celebrities, including David Attenborough's.

Both MacLeod and Baddiel have described the show as a failure: Baddiel called it "not right in so many ways" and MacLeod called it a "fiftysomething commissioner's fantasy of merging The Tube and That Was the Week That Was...the clips that exist capture the horrible, echoey silence with which most of our monologues were received...[it] turns out it's a good idea to have very strong opinions about stuff before signing up to do a polemical TV series." Baddiel also said in 2016 that "I actually think bits of it were interesting and funny. But the presentation was appalling."

Viewing figures were not encouraging and the show ran for a single series; Baddiel was privately asked if he was interested in filming a second series without his co-hosts but declined. It has never been repeated, although in 2016 Channel 4 released eight of the nine episodes to its All 4 streaming service, following increased public interest in Gove after the EU membership referendum.
