= Liz James =

British art historian

Liz James FBA
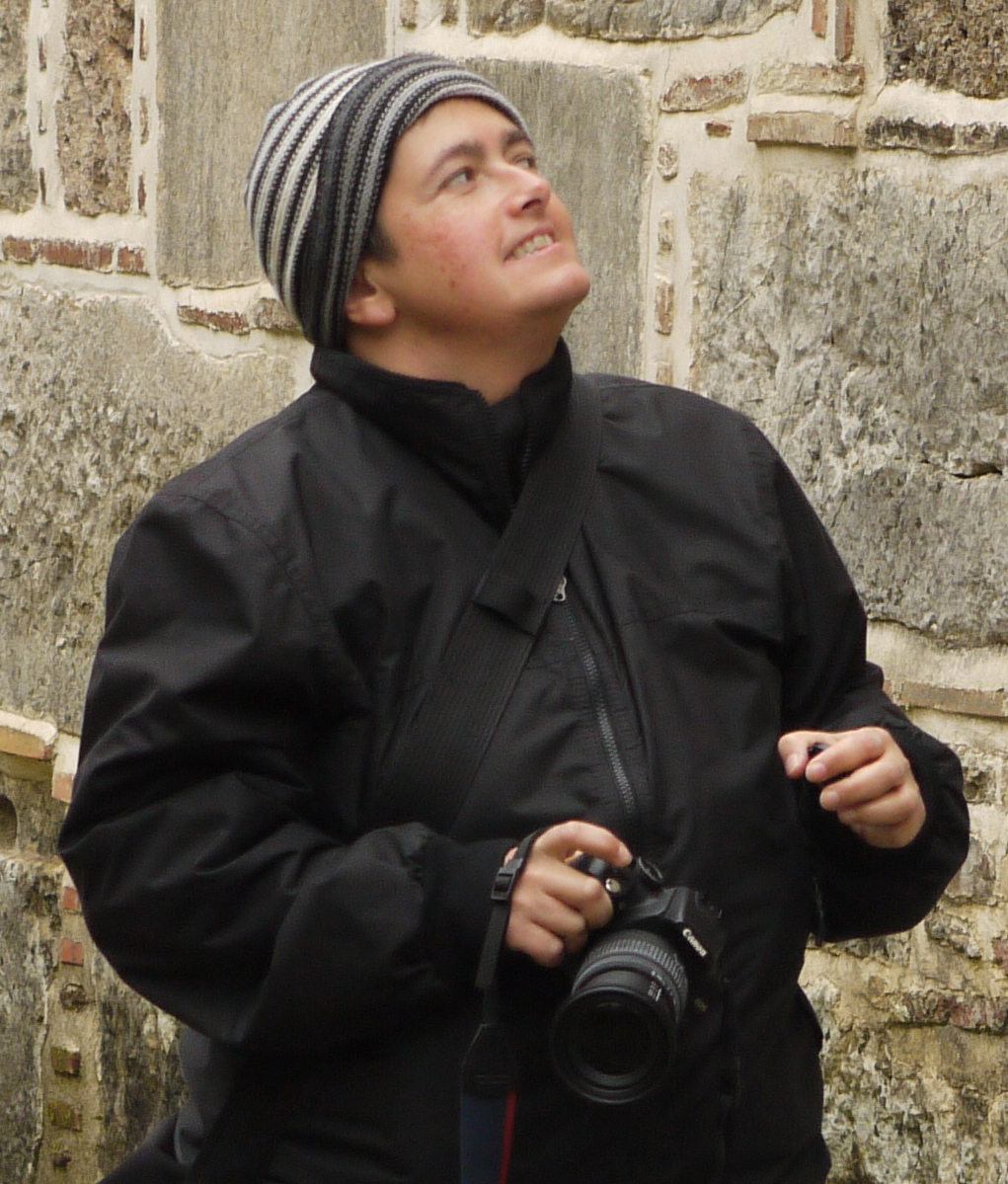
- James in 2010
- Born: 14 June 1964 (age 62); Derby, Derbyshire, England

Academic background
- Education: Durham University; University of Birmingham; Courtauld Institute of Art
- Thesis: Colour Perception in Byzantium

Academic work
- Discipline: Art historian
- Sub-discipline: Byzantine Empire; Byzantine art; Byzantine mosaics; gender studies
- Institutions: Barber Institute of Fine Arts; University of Sussex

Elizabeth James FBA (born 14 June 1964) is a British art historian and academic, specialising in the art of the Byzantine Empire. She is Professor of the History of Art at the University of Sussex. In 2024 and 2025, James was a member of a team that won Christmas University Challenge for two consecutive years, with Carla Denyer, Sophia Smith Galer and Tracey MacLeod.

== Early life and education ==
James was born on 14 June 1964 in Dover, Kent, England. She was educated at Derby High School, then an all-girls independent school in Derby, East Midlands. She studied ancient history and archaeology University of Durham, graduating with a first class honours Bachelor of Arts (BA) in 1985. She then undertook a Master of Arts (MA) degree in Byzantine studies at the University of Birmingham, which she completed in 1986. She studied for a Doctor of Philosophy (PhD) degree at the Courtauld Institute in London under Robin Cormack. Her thesis discussed light and colour in Byzantine art and was entitled Colour Perception in Byzantium (1989).

== Academic career ==
Upon completion, she embarked on postdoctoral fellowships, notably at the Barber Institute. In 1993 she joined the University of Sussex. She was a lecturer in art history before being promoted to senior lecturer in 1998 and to reader in art history in 2003. She was appointed Professor of Art History in 2006 or 2007. Her professorial lecture was given in 2011 and discussed the mosaics in the apse of Hagia Sophia.

In July 2024, James was elected as a Fellow of the British Academy (FBA).

=== Research specialism ===
James is known as a keen promoter of all areas of Byzantine art and Byzantine culture. She has particular interests in mosaics and in gender issues. She has written extensively on mosaics, discussing practical, iconographic and materialistic approaches to the subject. She has also established a database of Byzantine glass mosaics. In the field of gender, she has discussed Byzantine empresses, eunuchs and the way Byzantine society reacted to gender. She is also interested in the relationship between text and image, believing Byzantine texts to be of equal importance to Byzantine art. James contributed to the Royal Academy's 2008 Byzantium exhibition catalogue and gave a lecture to the academy.

== Publications ==
=== Books ===
==== Author ====
- Empresses and Power in Early Byzantium (Leicester University Press, 2001)
- Light and Colour in Byzantine Art (Clarendon Press, Oxford, 1996)

==== Editor and contributor ====
- Art and Text in Byzantium (Cambridge University Press, 2007), Introduction, and paper, '"And shall these mute stones speak?" Text as image'.
- Icon and Word. The power of images in Byzantium (Ashgate, 2003), editor with Antony Eastmond, and contributor, "Introduction: Icon and Word", xxix–xxxiv, and "Art and Lies: Text, image and imagination in the medieval world", 59–72.
- Desire and Denial in Byzantium (Variorum, Aldershot, 1999)
- Women, men and eunuchs: gender in Byzantium (Routledge, London, 1997), editor and contributor, "Introduction: Women's Studies, Gender Studies, Byzantine Studies", xi–xxiv

=== Other publications ===
- 'At Church' in eds. R. Cormack and M. Vassilaki, Byzantium 330–1453 (Royal Academy, London, 2008)
- James, Liz (2006). "Byzantine glass mosaic tesserae: some material considerations". Byzantine and Modern Greek Studies. 30 (1): 29–48. doi:10.1179/030701306X96582.
- 'Seeing is believing but words tell no lies: captions and images in the Libri Carolini and Byzantine Iconoclasm' in eds. A. L. McClanan and J. Johnson, Negating the image: case studies in iconoclasm (Ashgate, 2005), 97–112
- 'Get your kit on! Issues in the depiction of clothing in Byzantium' (with Shaun Tougher) in ed. L. Cleland, M. Harlow and L. Llewellyn-Jones, The Clothed Body in the Ancient World (Oxbow, 2005), 154–161
- 'Good luck and good fortune to the Queen of Cities: empresses and tyches in Byzantium' in eds. E. J. Stafford and J. Herrin, Personification in the Greek world (Ashgate, 2005), 293–308
- 'Adorned with piety: authority, devotion and the empress in early Byzantium', in ed. M.Vassilaki, Images of the Mother of God, (Ashgate, 2005), 145–52
- James, Liz (2004). "Senses and sensibility in Byzantium". Art History. 27 (4): 522–537. doi:10.1111/j.0141-6790.2004.00436.x.
- "Building for God: imperial women and monastic foundations in Constantinople". Basilissa. 1: 50–64. 2004.
- 'Who's that girl? Personifications of the Byzantine empress' in ed. C. Entwistle, Through a Glass Brightly. Festschrift for David Buckton (Oxbow Publications, Oxford 2004), 51–6
- James, Liz (2003). "Color and meaning in Byzantium". Journal of Early Christian Studies. 11 (2): 223–233. doi:10.1353/earl.2003.0027.
- 'Dry bones and painted pictures: relics and icons in Byzantium' in ed. A. Lidov, Eastern Christian Relics (Research Centre for Eastern Christian Culture, Moscow, 2002), 45–55
- Brigstocke, Hugh, ed. (2001). "Byzantine art". The Oxford Companion to Western Art. Oxford: Oxford University Press. ISBN 978-0-19-866203-7.
- 'Bearing gifts from the East: imperial relic-hunters abroad' in ed. A. Eastmond, Eastern Approaches to Byzantium (Ashgate, Aldershot, 2000), 119–132
- 'What colours were Byzantine mosaics?' in eds. E. Borsook, F. Superbi, G. Pagliarulo, Medieval mosaics: light, color, materials (Harvard University Centre for Italian Renaissance Studies, Florence, 2000), 35–46
- 'As the actress said to the bishop...Byzantine women in English-language fiction', in eds. R. S. Cormack and E. Jeffreys, Through the Looking-Glass. Byzantium through British eyes (Ashgate, Aldershot 2000), 237–249
- 'Women and politics in the Byzantine Empire: imperial women' in ed. L. E. Mitchell, Women in Medieval Western European Culture (Garland, 1999), (with Barbara Hill), 157–178
- 'Goddess, whore, wife or slave? Will the real Byzantine empress please stand up' in ed. A. Duggan, Queens and Queenship in Medieval Europe (Boydell and Brewer,1997), 123–40
- '"Pray not to fall into temptation and be on your guard". Antique Statues in Byzantine Constantinople', Gesta 35 (1996), 12–20
- "Hysterical (Hi)stories of art, Review Article". Oxford Art Journal. 18: 143–147. 1995. doi:10.1093/oxartj/18.1.143.
- 'The East Dome of San Marco: a reconsideration', Dumbarton Oaks Papers 48 (1994), (with E. J. W. Hawkins), 229–242
- 'Monks, monastic art and the Middle Byzantine Church' in eds. M. Mullett & A. Kirby, The Theotokos Evergetis and Eleventh Century Monasticism (Belfast Byzantine Texts and Translations, Belfast 1994), 162–175.
- 'Zoe. The rhythm method of imperial renewal' in ed. P.Magdalino, New Constantines (Variorum, Aldershot, 1994) (with B. Hill & D. C. Smythe), 215–230
- James, Liz (1991). "Colour and the Byzantine rainbow". Byzantine and Modern Greek Studies. 15: 66–95. doi:10.1179/byz.1991.15.1.66.
- Liz James; Ruth Webb, eds. (1991). "To understand ultimate things and enter secret places: ekphrasis and art in Byzantium". Art History. 14: 1–15. doi:10.1111/j.1467-8365.1991.tb00420.x.

== Filmography ==
=== Television ===
Year	Title	Role	Notes	Ref(s)
2024	Christmas University Challenge	Contestant	Heat: "Warwick v. Durham"	
2025	Christmas University Challenge	Semi-Finalist	Semi-Final: "Durham v. Worcester College, Oxford"	
2025	Christmas University Challenge	Series 14 Winner (Note: James, Carla Denyer, Sophia Smith Galer and Tracey MacLeod comprised the Durham University team that won.)	Final: "Durham v. Queens' College, Cambridge"	
2025	Christmas University Challenge	Contestant	Heat: "Durham v. Manchester"	
2026	Christmas University Challenge	Semi-Finalist	Semi-Final: "Durham v. Trinity College, Cambridge"	
2026	Christmas University Challenge	Series 15 Winner	Final: "Durham v. Keble College, Oxford"	
