= The Write Stuff =

Quiz game that would take place on the radio

- Genre: literary panel game
- Running time: 28 mins
- Country of origin: United Kingdom
- Language: English
- Home station: BBC Radio 4
- Hosted by: James Walton
- Starring: Sebastian Faulks; John Walsh; Beth Chalmers
- Produced by: Sam Michell
- No. of series: 17
- Website: Website

The Write Stuff, "Radio 4's game of literary correctness", is a lighthearted quiz about literature on BBC Radio 4, taking a humorous look at famous literary figures, which ran from 1998 to 2014. It was chaired and written by James Walton. The two teams were captained by novelist Sebastian Faulks and journalist John Walsh, with Beth Chalmers reading literary extracts.

== Format ==
John Walsh and Sebastian Faulks were team captains from the programme's beginning. They were each joined by another journalist or novelist; frequent guests in later years included John O'Farrell, Mark Billingham and Lynn Truss. Truss stepped in as captain to replace Faulks for series 13 (2010).

Each week, the programme had an "Author of the Week"; W. B. Yeats, E. M. Forster, D. H. Lawrence, Robert Burns, and J. K. Rowling all featured. The programme, on occasion, featured a group of writers, rather than a single author, as its key study – for example, poets of the Beat Generation were the featured authors on 26 October 2010. Each programme began with the panellists reading favourite extracts from the author's writing, and the first round is a series of questions about the author's life and works.

The programme normally ended with panellists having to write a pastiche (or parody; the programme uses the terms interchangeably) based on that week's author of the week. Walton describes these as 'the most popular bit of the programme'. Walton sets a topic that would be so out of style of the author in question that a pastiche would be humorous. For example, when Robert Burns was the author of the week, contestants were asked to write a poem, in the style of Burns, celebrating something typically English; when Philip Roth was the author of the week, contestants were asked how he might have written a children's story. Faulks has published a collection of his parodies as a book, Pistache.

The intervening rounds do not focus on the author of the week. Rounds commonly included are: connections; odd one out; literary mistakes; the archive round; and a music round.

The programme was normally broadcast at 18:30 on a weekday, one of the Radio 4 comedy slots.

== Episodes ==
=== Series 1 (1998) ===
Episode	Original airdate	Author of the week	Guests
1–1	1998-07-31	Jane Austen	Victoria Glendinning, Tracey MacLeod
1–2	1998-08-07	Raymond Chandler	Louise Doughty, Victoria Coren
1–3	1998-08-14	T. S. Eliot	Kate Saunders, Nigel Williams
1–4	1998-08-21	Martin Amis	Victoria Glendinning, Tracey MacLeod
1–5	1998-08-28	D. H. Lawrence	Louise Doughty, Victoria Coren
1–6	1998-09-04	Charles Dickens	Jonathan Myerson, Nigel Williams

=== Series 2 (1999) ===
Episode	Original airdate	Author of the week	Guests
2–1	1999-07-07	William Shakespeare	Nigel Williams, Lynne Truss
2–2	1999-07-14	Arthur Conan Doyle	Tracey MacLeod, Philippa Gregory
2–3	1999-07-21	The Brontë Sisters	Frank Delaney, Harry Ritchie
2–4	1999-07-28	James Joyce	Lynne Truss, Nigel Williams
2–5	1999-08-04	Ernest Hemingway	Tracey MacLeod, Philippa Gregory
2–6	1999-08-11	Oscar Wilde	Frank Delaney, Harry Ritchie

=== Series 3 (2000) ===
Episode	Original airdate	Author of the week	Guests
3–1	2000-05-10	Thomas Hardy	Lynne Truss, Sue Limb
3–2	2000-05-17	Agatha Christie	Jane Thynne, Harry Ritchie
3–3	2000-05-24	Geoffrey Chaucer	Imogen Stubbs, Louise Doughty
3–4	2000-05-31	Kingsley Amis	Lynne Truss, Sue Limb
3–5	2000-06-07	Samuel Beckett	Jane Thynne, Harry Ritchie
3–6	2000-06-14	Evelyn Waugh	Imogen Stubbs, Louise Doughty

=== Series 4 (2001) ===
Episode	Original airdate	Author of the week	Guests
4–1	2001-04-11	William Wordsworth	Tracey MacLeod, Gary Younge
4–2	2001-04-18	Graham Greene	Jonathan Myerson, Jane Thynne
4–3	2001-04-25	Enid Blyton	Sue Limb, Victoria Coren
4–4	2001-05-02	John Updike	Tracey MacLeod, Gary Younge
4–5	2001-05-09	Harold Pinter	Jonathan Myerson, Jane Thynne
4–6	2001-05-16	John Betjeman	Sue Limb, Victoria Coren

=== Series 5 (2002) ===
Episode	Original airdate	Author of the week	Guests
5–1	2002-04-03	Ian Fleming	Nigel Williams, Harry Ritchie
5–2	2002-04-10	Samuel Taylor Coleridge	Stephen Fry, Lynne Truss
5–3	2002-04-17	Virginia Woolf	Wendy Holden, Joseph Connolly
5–4	2002-04-24	J. R. R. Tolkien	Nigel Williams, Harry Ritchie
5–5	2002-05-01	Philip Larkin	Stephen Fry, Lynne Truss
5–6	2002-05-08	P. G. Wodehouse	Wendy Holden, Joseph Connolly

=== Christmas Special (2002) ===
Episode	Original airdate	Author of the week	Guests
CS2002	2002-12-25	Parodies Regained	Stephen Fry, Sue Limb, Lynne Truss et al.

=== Series 6 (2003) ===
Episode	Original airdate	Author of the week	Guests
6–1	2003-04-02	George Orwell	John O'Farrell, Louise Doughty
6–2	2003-04-09	(no programme due to coverage of The Budget)	
6–3	2003-04-16	Samuel Johnson	Sue Limb, Joanne Harris
6–4	2003-04-23	Lewis Carroll	John O'Farrell, Louise Doughty
6–5	2003-04-30	Franz Kafka	Tracey MacLeod, Jonathan Myerson
6–6	2003-05-07	Jane Austen	Sue Limb, Joanne Harris

=== Series 7 (2004) ===
Episode	Original airdate	Author of the week	Guests
7–1	2004-04-21	George Orwell (repeat of 6-1)	John O'Farrell, Louise Doughty
7–2	2004-04-28	Beatrix Potter	Tracey MacLeod, Jonathan Myerson
7–3	2004-05-05	Samuel Johnson (repeat of 6-3)	Sue Limb, Joanne Harris
7–4	2004-05-12	Dylan Thomas	John Sutherland, Sabrina Broadbent
7–5	2004-05-19	Richmal Crompton	Miles Kington, Harry Ritchie
7–6	2004-05-26	Rudyard Kipling	Nicholas Lezard, Nigel Williams
7–7	2004-06-02	Catherine Cookson	John Sutherland, Sabrina Broadbent
7–8	2004-06-09	Alexander Pope	Miles Kington, Harry Ritchie
7–9	2004-06-16	Samuel Pepys	Nicholas Lezard, Nigel Williams

=== Christmas Special (2004) ===
Episode	Original airdate	Author of the week	Guests
CS2004	2004-12-29	Christmas	Miles Kington, Sabrina Broadbent

=== Series 8 (2005) ===
Episode	Original airdate	Author of the week	Guests
8–1	2005-05-25	Lord Byron	Simon Brett, Peter Kemp
8–2	2005-06-01	Noël Coward	Wendy Holden, Louise Doughty
8–3	2005-06-08	Iris Murdoch	Nigel Williams, Jonathan Myerson
8–4	2005-06-15	Roald Dahl	Simon Brett, Peter Kemp
8–5	2005-06-22	John Milton	Wendy Holden, Louise Doughty
8–6	2005-06-29	Charles Dickens	Nigel Williams, Kate Saunders

=== Series 9 (2006) ===
Episode	Original airdate	Author of the week	Guests
9–1	2006-06-12	Alan Bennett	Michèle Roberts, Harry Ritchie
9–2	2006-06-19	Henry James	Peter Kemp, Miles Kington
9–3	2006-06-26	A. A. Milne	Sue Limb, John O'Farrell
9–4	2006-07-03	Sylvia Plath	Michèle Roberts, Harry Ritchie
9–5	2006-07-10	W. B. Yeats	Peter Kemp, Miles Kington
9–6	2006-07-17	Thomas Hardy	Sue Limb, John O'Farrell

=== Series 10 (2007) ===
Episode	Original airdate	Author of the week	Guests
10–1	2007-03-12	William Shakespeare	Sabrina Broadbent, Mark Billingham
10–2	2007-03-19	John le Carré	Jane Thynne, Wendy Holden
10–3	2007-03-26	Tom Stoppard	Peter Kemp, Sue Limb
10–4	2007-04-02	Stephen King	Sabrina Broadbent, Mark Billingham
10–5	2007-04-09	F. Scott Fitzgerald	Jane Thynne, Wendy Holden
10–6	2007-04-16	John Keats	Peter Kemp, Sue Limb

=== Series 11 (2008) ===
Episode	Original airdate	Author of the week	Guests
11–1	2008-03-24	E. M. Forster	Wendy Holden, John O'Farrell
11–2	2008-03-31	John Grisham	Mark Billingham, Jane Thynne
11–3	2008-04-07	Jonathan Swift	Peter Kemp, Andrew Davies
11–4	2008-04-14	Hans Christian Andersen	Wendy Holden, John O'Farrell
11–5	2008-04-21	Ted Hughes	Jane Thynne, Mark Billingham
11–6	2008-04-28	George Eliot	Peter Kemp, Andrew Davies

=== Series 12 (2008) ===
Episode	Original airdate	Author of the week	Guests
12–1	2008-10-06	Raymond Chandler	Lynne Truss, Mark Billingham
12–2	2008-10-13	Seamus Heaney	Sue Limb, Andrew Motion
12–3	2008-10-20	Philip Roth	Harry Ritchie, Simon Brett
12–4	2008-10-27	J. K. Rowling	Mark Billingham, Lynne Truss
12–5	2008-11-03	D. H. Lawrence	Sue Limb, Andrew Motion
12–6	2008-11-10	Robert Burns	Harry Ritchie, Simon Brett

=== Series 13 (2010) ===
Episode	Original airdate	Author of the week	Guests
13–1	2010-01-27	Arthur Conan Doyle	Mark Billingham, John O'Farrell
13–2	2010-02-03	Irvine Welsh	Jane Thynne, Christopher Brookmyre
13–3	2010-02-10	Anton Chekhov	Peter Kemp, Tibor Fischer
13–4	2010-02-17	Nancy Mitford	Mark Billingham, John O'Farrell
13–5	2010-02-24	John Donne	Jane Thynne, Christopher Brookmyre
13–6	2010-03-03	J. D. Salinger	Peter Kemp, Tibor Fischer

=== Series 14 (2010) ===
Episode	Original airdate	Author of the week	Guests
14–1	2010-10-05	P. G. Wodehouse	Francis Wheen, Ian McMillan
14–2	2010-10-12	Tennessee Williams	Francesca Simon, Mark Billingham
14–3	2010-10-19	Marcel Proust	Philip Kerr, Sue Limb
14–4	2010-10-26	The Beats	Francis Wheen, Ian McMillan
14–5	2010-11-02	Stephenie Meyer	Francesca Simon, Mark Billingham
14–6	2010-11-09	Edgar Allan Poe	Philip Kerr, Sue Limb

=== Cheltenham Literature Festival Special ===
Episode	Original airdate	Author of the week	Guests
Sp.	2011-10-12	Enid Blyton	Sue Limb, Rachel Johnson

=== Series 15 (2012) ===
Episode	Original airdate	Author of the week	Guests
15–1	2012-01-20	John Betjeman	Sue Limb, Andrew Motion
15–2	2012-01-27	Daniel Defoe	Jane Thynne, Mark Billingham
15–3	2012-02-03	Gustave Flaubert	John O'Farrell, Alex Clark
15–4	2012-02-10	Terence Rattigan	Andrew Motion, Sue Limb
15–5	2012-02-17	Jackie Collins	Jane Thynne, Mark Billingham
15–6	2012-02-24	H. G. Wells	Alex Clark, John O'Farrell

=== Series 16 (2013) ===
Episode	Original airdate	Author of the week	Guests
16–1	2013-05-12	The Brontës	Sue Limb, Mark Watson
16–2	2013-05-19	Mark Twain	John O'Farrell, Jane Thynne
16–3	2013-05-26	Greek tragedy	Mark Billingham, Natalie Haynes
16–4	2013-06-02	Dorothy Parker	Sue Limb, Mark Watson
16–5	2013-06-09	William Blake	John O'Farrell, Jane Thynne
16–6	2013-06-16	Ian Fleming	Mark Billingham, Natalie Haynes

=== Series 17 (2014) ===
Episode	Original airdate	Author of the week	Guests
17–1	2014-10-05	John Osborne	Mark Billingham, Lynne Truss
17–2	2014-10-12	Jilly Cooper	John O'Farrell, Jane Thynne
17–3	2014-10-19	Gerard Manley Hopkins	Russell Davies, Sue Limb
17–4	2014-10-26	Jerome K Jerome	Mark Billingham, Lynne Truss
17–5	2014-11-02	Henry Fielding	Jane Thynne, John O'Farrell
17–6	2014-11-09	Virginia Woolf	Russell Davies, Sue Limb
