= Tracey MacLeod =

English journalist and broadcaster

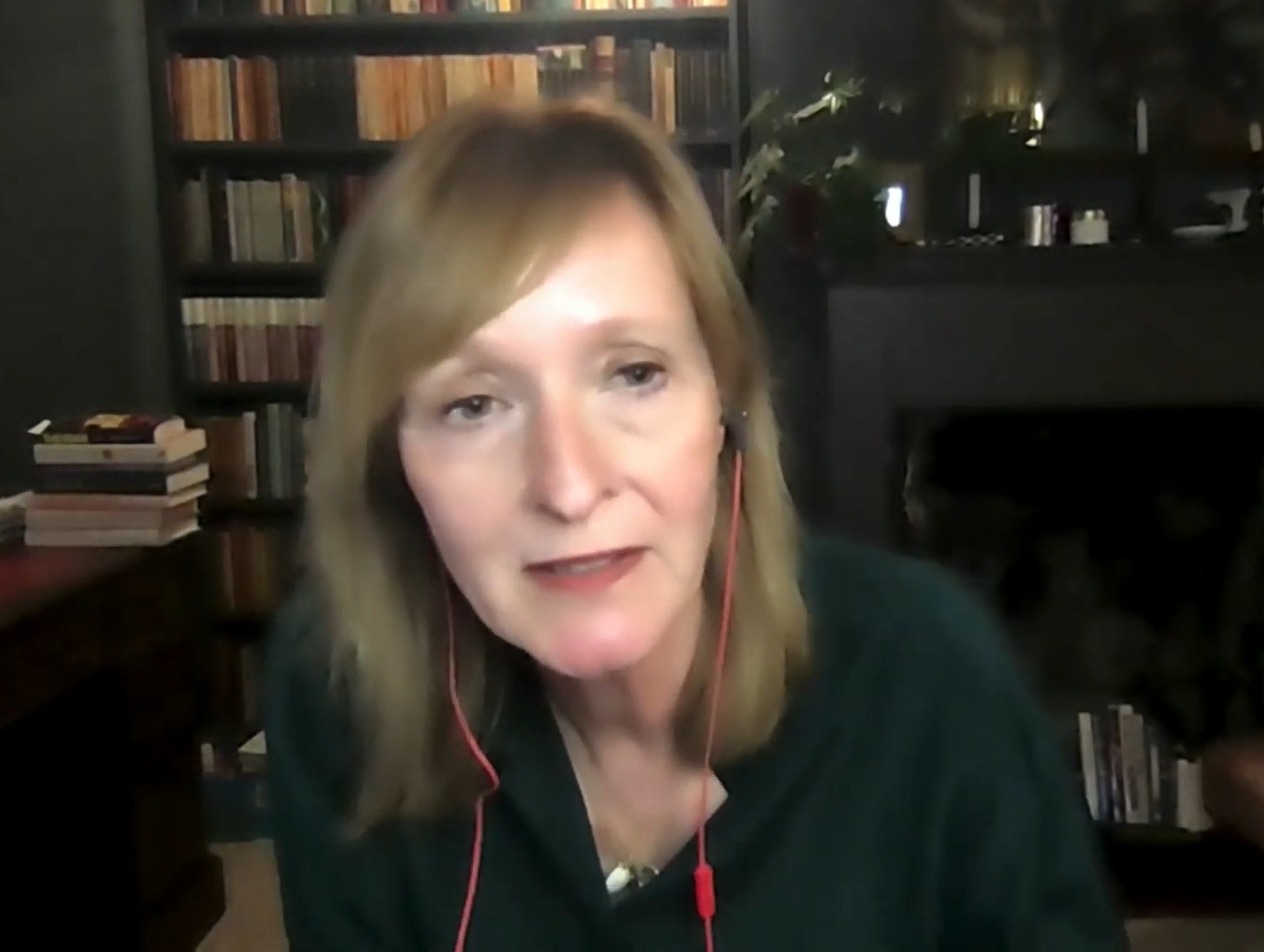
- MacLeod in 2021
- Born: 30 October 1960 (age 65); Ipswich, Suffolk, England
- Education: Ipswich High School
- Alma mater: University of Durham
- Occupations: Journalist, MasterChef: The Professionals food critic, The Independent restaurant critic, broadcaster, talent agency director
- Employer(s): The Independent, BBC, The Mail on Sunday

Tracey MacLeod (born 30 October 1960 in Ipswich, Suffolk) is an English journalist and broadcaster. She has presented arts and music programming, including The Late Show (1989–95) and its musical offshoots New West and Words and Music, Edinburgh Nights (1989, 1990), the Booker Prize (1990–95) and the Mercury Music Prize (1994–98). She hosted a Sunday night radio show on GLR for several years from 1990, and was one of the launch DJs on BBC Radio 6 Music.

== Early life and education ==
Macleod was born in 1960 and was brought up in Ipswich, Suffolk. Her mother was Anglo-Indian, and her father was a dentist from London, who moved to Ipswich for "a quieter life".

MacLeod attended Ipswich High School and read English Literature at St Aidan's College, Durham University (1979-1982).

== Career ==
Macleod worked as a researcher for the BBC before making her on-screen debut in 1987 on Channel 4's youth show Network 7. Her other screen credits include Channel 4's A Stab in the Dark with David Baddiel and Michael Gove, All I Want – A Portrait of Rufus Wainwright, Kitchen Criminals, Masterchef, and voicing over many music documentaries and the long-running BBC2 show Rapido, presented by Antoine de Caunes. She appeared as a guest interviewer in Sean Hughes's 1992 comedy series Sean's Show. Her friend Helen Fielding partly based the Jude character in Bridget Jones's Diary on her, and she appeared as an extra in the literary party scene of the film, directed by Sharon Maguire.

MacLeod was a team captain on the BBC Radio 4 music quiz All the Way from Memphis (chaired by Andrew Collins), and a regular contestant on the Radio 4 books quiz The Write Stuff.

She was the restaurant critic of The Independent from 1997 until the paper ended its print edition in 2016, winning the Glenfiddich Spirit of Scotland Award for "Restaurant Writer of the Year" in 2003, and being awarded "Restaurant Writer of the Year" by the Guild of Food Writers in 2008 and 2010. She has also been literary editor of Marie Claire and radio critic of The Mail on Sunday.

She is a director of the talent agency KBJ Management, at which she manages TV presenters including Simon Amstell and Kevin McCloud.

In 2024, MacLeod, alongside Carla Denyer, Liz James, and Sophia Smith Galer, made up Durham University's alumni team that won Christmas University Challenge, beating Queen's College Cambridge in the final (aired on 3 January 2025). The following year, MacLeod and her teammates returned to the programme as part of the fifteenth anniversary of the programme, making history by being the first team to win back-to-back.

MacLeod is a regular guest critic on Masterchef.
