= 1975 in American television =

This is a list of American television-related events in 1975.

== Events ==
Date	Event	Ref.
January 3	A day for NBC game shows that could be described as anything but uneventful. In the morning, Dennis James' version of Name That Tune and the Bob Stewart/Bill Cullen series Winning Streak end their run. In the afternoon, the biggest prize in American daytime television game shows at the time is won on Jackpot, in which two contestants split a cash prize of $38,750. Finally, the original Jeopardy! also ends its run after 2,753 episodes. It would return in nationwide syndication in 1984.	
January 6	Another eventful day for NBC's daytime schedule. The morning sees the premiere episode of Wheel of Fortune, with Chuck Woolery as host and Susan Stafford as the assistant, while in the afternoon Blank Check, the Art James/Jack Barry game show debuts. Finally, Another World becomes the first American soap opera to become an hour-long program.	
January 11	On CBS's All in the Family, the Bunkers say goodbye to their neighbors as The Jeffersons "move on up" to their own separate sitcom.	
March 4	CBS airs the very first annual People's Choice Awards.	
March 18	McLean Stevenson makes his final appearance as Lieutenant Colonel Henry Blake on CBS' M*A*S*H. The episode ends with revelation that Blake after being honorably discharged, is reported killed by enemy fire. This would also be the final appearance for Wayne Rogers as Captain Trapper John McIntyre.	
March 28	Gunsmoke airs its last televised episode on CBS. Ultimately, the plotline was cut short, so it was ended on a cliffhanger.	
April 21	Following on from Another World less than three months ago, NBC's Days of Our Lives begins airing hour-long episodes.	
April 25	ABC broadcasts the special program, Alice Cooper: The Nightmare.	
April 25	Independent station WKBF-TV in Cleveland, Ohio merges its operations with rival independent WUAB and ceases operations.	
April 28	NBC's The Tomorrow Show finds Tom Snyder interviewing John Lennon.	
May 29	NBC affiliate WHFV in Fredericksburg, Virginia, citing financial troubles, ceases operations.	
June 5	Fred Silverman becomes the head of ABC Entertainment. Silverman's programming choices will prove fruitful for ABC, resulting in its late-decade ratings dominance (and initiating an era of what was disparagingly called "T&A" or "Jiggle television").	
September 8	The CBS game show The Price is Right is expanded to the length of one hour, with six games and two Showcase Showdowns as a week-long experiment. The format, which marked the debut of "The Big Wheel", is made permanent two months later.	
September 22	Television comes to Alpena, Michigan when CBS affiliate WBKB-TV signs-on.	
September 29	The first television station in the U.S. to be owned and operated by African Americans signs on in Detroit, Michigan as WGPR-TV channel 62, which is present-day CBS O&O WWJ-TV.	
September 30	HBO broadcasts the Muhammad Ali-Joe Frazier title fight from the Philippines. Known as the "Thrilla in Manila", the live feed was sent via satellite to the U.S.	
October 11	NBC's Saturday Night (now known as Saturday Night Live) premieres. Comedian George Carlin is the first host.	
October 21	NBC broadcasts the now legendary 12-inning long sixth game of the 1975 World Series between the Boston Red Sox and the Cincinnati Reds, in which the Red Sox tied the series on a Carlton Fisk home run more notable for Fisk's reaction.	
November 11	On an episode of the ABC sitcom Happy Days, Penny Marshall and Cindy Williams make their first appearances as Laverne DeFazio and Shirley Feeney respectively. This will soon lead to the characters being spun-off into their own series, which will run for eight seasons.	
November 23	NBC is forced to join Willy Wonka & the Chocolate Factory in progress at the conclusion of an NFL football game between the Washington Redskins and the Oakland Raiders, which ended in overtime. This was done to avoid a repeat of the "Heidi Game" incident of 1968, in which the network interrupted coverage of an AFL game between the Raiders and the New York Jets to show the movie Heidi, a decision that infuriated football fans and haunted network executives.	
November 23	Sneak Previews (under the name Opening Soon at a Theater Near You), the first American film review show, premieres and launches the careers of critics Gene Siskel and Roger Ebert. They will remain a team, and a staple among film critics, through various programs for the next twenty-four years.	
December 1	CBS makes its first soap opera expansion when the top-rated As The World Turns airs its first hour-long episode.	

=== Other notable events ===
- In November, Sony Corporation introduces the Betamax video recorder in the United States, which comes in a teakwood console alongside a 19 inches (480 mm) color television set. It sold for $2,495.
- NBC retires both the 1956 Laramie Peacock logo, which was used at the start of every color program on the network, and the 1959 NBC snake logo, used for promos and network identifications, after this year.

== Programs ==
^{^[e]} signifies that this show has a related event in the Events section above.

=== Debuting this year ===
Date	Show	Network
January 6	Blank Check	NBC
January 6	Wheel of Fortune	NBC
January 17	Baretta	ABC
January 18	The Jeffersons	CBS
January 23	Barney Miller	ABC
April 21	Blankety Blanks	ABC
June 16	Spin-Off	CBS
June 16	Musical Chairs	CBS
June 30	Showoffs	ABC
July 7	The Magnificent Marble Machine	NBC
July 7	Rhyme and Reason	ABC
July 7	Ryan's Hope	ABC
September 4	Space: 1999	Syndication
September 6	The Great Grape Ape Show	ABC
September 6	The New Tom and Jerry Show	ABC
September 8	Give-n-Take	CBS
September 8	Match Game PM	Syndication
September 8	Phyllis	CBS
September 8	The Invisible Man	NBC
September 9	Joe Forrester	NBC
September 9	Welcome Back, Kotter	ABC
September 11	Ellery Queen	NBC
September 12	Mobile One	ABC
September 14	The Swiss Family Robinson	ABC
September 14	Three for the Road	CBS
September 29	Three for the Money	NBC
October 11	NBC's Saturday Night	NBC
November 3	Good Morning America	ABC
November 7	Wonder Woman (Note: The debut of this program is a TV movie, which serves as the pilot for the actual series, which premiered in early 1976.)	NBC
November 30	McCoy	NBC
December 16	One Day at a Time	CBS

=== Ending this year ===
Date	Show	Debut date	Notes
January 3	Jeopardy! (returned in 1984)	1964	(Note: Jeopardy! returned in national syndication in 1984.)
January 3	Winning Streak	1974	
January 9	Friends and Lovers	1974	
January 12	Apple's Way	1974	
January 16	Ironside	1967	
March 7	The Odd Couple	1970	
March 28	Kolchak: The Night Stalker	1974	
March 31	Gunsmoke	1955	
April 13	Mannix	1967	
April 18	How to Survive a Marriage	1974	
April 25	Hot l Baltimore	1975	
April 26	Kung Fu	1972	
May 20	Adam-12	1968	
June 13	The Joker's Wild	1972	(Note: Returned in 1977.)
June 13	Now You See It	1974	(Note: Returned in 1989)
June 27	Blankety Blanks	1975	
June 27	Password	1961	(Note: Returned in 1979 as Password Plus.)
June 27	Split Second	1972	(Note: Returned in 1986.)
June 27	The Money Maze	1974	
July 4	Blank Check	1975	
July 4	The Big Showdown	1974	
July 24	The Texas Wheelers	1974	
August 1	Death Valley Days	1952	
September 5	What's My Line?	1950	
September 5	Spin-Off	1975	
September 26	Jackpot	1974	(Note: Returned in 1985.)
October 31	Musical Chairs	1975	
November 28	Give-n-Take	1975	
November 28	Three for the Money	1975	
November 30	Run, Joe, Run	1974	
November 28	Three for the Road	1975	
December 13	The Great Grape Ape Show	1975	
December 13	The New Tom and Jerry Show	1975	
December 24	That's My Mama	1974	
December 26	Showoffs	1975	

=== Changing networks ===
Show	Moved from	Moved to
The Edge of Night	CBS	ABC
The Bugs Bunny Show	ABC	CBS

=== Television specials ===
- January 28 – Be My Valentine, Charlie Brown (CBS)
- April 25 – Alice Cooper: The Nightmare (ABC)
- October 28 – You're a Good Sport, Charlie Brown (CBS)

== Networks and services ==
=== Network launches ===
Network	Type	Launch date	Notes	Source
Louisiana Public Broadcasting	Over-the-air state network	September 6	The Louisiana Educational Television Authority, established in 1971, approved the proposal to build and sign on the stations that would make up the network, starting with Baton Rouge-based WLPB-TV, the network's flagship.	

== Television stations ==
=== Sign-ons ===
Date	City of License/Market	Station	Channel	Affiliation	Notes/Ref.
January 4	Sioux City, Iowa	KSIN-TV	27	PBS/IPTV	
January 20	Springfield, Missouri	KOZK	21	PBS	
February	South Bend, Indiana	WNIT	34	PBS	
March 15	Biddeford/Portland, Maine	WMEG-TV	26	PBS via Maine Public Broadcasting Net.	
May 7	Anchorage, Alaska	KAKM	7	PBS	
June 10	Menomonie, Wisconsin	WHWC-TV	27	PBS via WPT	
August 13	San Francisco, California	KDTV	14	Spanish Int'l Network	
September 6	Baton Rouge, Louisiana	WLPB-TV	27	PBS/LPB	
September 7	Council Bluffs, Iowa	KBIN-TV	32	PBS/IPTV	
September 7	Red Oak, Iowa	KHIN	36	PBS/IPTV	
September 7	Sumter, South Carolina	WRJA-TV	27	PBS/SCETV	Satellite of WRLK-TV/Columbia, SC
September 21	Akron/Canton, Ohio	WEAO	45	PBS	Satellite of WNEO of Youngstown, Ohio
September 22	Alpena, Michigan	WBKB-TV	11	CBS	
September 29	Detroit, Michigan	WGPR-TV	62	Independent	First television station in the U.S. to be owned and operated by African Americans.
November 21	Alpena, Michigan	WCML-TV	6	PBS	Satellite of WCMU-TV/Mt. Pleasant, Michigan
Unknown	Albuquerque, New Mexico	KMXN-TV	23	SIN	
Unknown	Miami, Florida	WFCB-TV	45	Independent	

=== Network affiliation changes ===
Date	City of license/Market	Station	Channel	Old affiliation	New affiliation	Notes/Ref.
Unknown	Harrisonburg, Virginia	WHSV-TV	3	ABC (primary); NBC (secondary)	ABC (exclusive)	

=== Station closures ===
Date	City of license/Market	Station	Channel	Affiliation	First air date	Notes/Ref.
February 11	Roanoke, Virginia	WRLU	27	ABC	September 7, 1974	Had been on air March 1966–April 1974 as WRFT-TV
April 25	Cleveland, Ohio	WKBF-TV	61	Independent	January 19, 1968	Station's operations were folded into WUAB/Lorain, Ohio
May 29	Fredericksburg, Virginia	WHFV	69	NBC	October 8, 1973	
September 1	Pembina, North Dakota	KCND-TV	12	Independent (primary); ABC (secondary)	November 7, 1960	
September 2	South Bend, Indiana	WMSH-TV	46	July 26, 1974 | Returned to air as WHME-TV on September 10, 1977		
December	Elko, Nevada	KEKO	10		April 18, 1973	Satellite of KTVN/Reno
October 22	Paducah, Kentucky	WDXR-TV	29	independent	May 31, 1971	Would return to the air in 1979 as WKPD
December 23	Los Angeles	KVST-TV	68	Non-commercial independent	May 5, 1974	

== See also ==
- 1975 in television
- 1975 in film
- List of American films of 1975
- 1974-75 United States network television schedule
- 1975-76 United States network television schedule
- Family Viewing Hour
