= Headline Hunters (game show) =

Canadian game show

Headline Hunters is a Canadian game show that appeared on CTV from 1972 to 1982. It was originally created by Nick Nicholson and E. Roger Muir (creators of The Newlywed Game, Spin-Off, Definition, Guess What, and others). It was hosted by Jim Perry, who hosted two other Canadian game shows (Eye Bet and Definition) and several American game shows concurrently with its run. CFTO-TV meteorologist Dave Devall, who worked with Perry on the aforementioned two series, served as the announcer and was a de facto co-host for this series. It was a Glen-Warren Production for the CTV Television Network and was filmed at the Glen-Warren Studios in the Toronto suburb of Scarborough.

During the final broadcast, Jim Perry applauded the long-running show for promoting news literacy. Perry carried many of his pet phrases with him on his later American game show, Sale of the Century, which he would host for six years.

== Object ==
The idea of the game was for contestants to identify a newsmaker or event from clues given in the form of headlines, a format inspired in part by CBC Television's Front Page Challenge. Three players competed on each episode.

== Rules ==
Host Perry would begin the game by giving the players a category in which the subject fell. Once he did so and gave the starting point value for the subject, Devall would begin reading the headlines one at a time. Four subjects were played in each round, with a total of five headlines for each. For each headline revealed, the point value would be reduced. As the round progressed, the points increased accordingly.

Players could buzz in at any time, and if a player correctly identified the subject they earned the number of points in play. A wrong answer deducted those points and the player was locked out for the remainder of the subject. No player, however, was allowed to go below zero.

In the third round, a special guest subject was featured. The special guest was always the third subject of the round and gave their own headlines instead of the announcer. In order to receive credit for a correct answer the players could either identify the person in question or something associated with them. After the special guest or their claim to fame was identified, Perry would bring them out for a brief interview.

There was no limit on how many rounds could be played, as the game was played to time.

=== Point Values ===
	Identity One	Identity Two	Identity Three	Identity Four
Headline One	100	200	300	400
Headline Two	50	100	200	300
Headline Three	40	50	100	200
Headline Four	30	40	50	100
Headline Five	20	30	40	50

=== Hidden Headline Word ===
There was one word in one of the answers that was chosen by the producers as the night’s hidden headline word. The first player to guess the identity featuring that word won a bonus prize, theirs to keep regardless of the game's outcome.

=== Deadline ===
After the time-up buzzer sounded, the Deadline was played. One final subject and set of headlines were played, starting at 500 points and decreasing by 100 for each headline revealed until either all five headlines were revealed or someone identified the subject.

The player in the lead at the end of the Deadline was the night's champion and advanced to play the Rapid Round for bonus cash.

== Rapid Round ==
In the Rapid Round, the champion is given 60 seconds to identify as many subjects as possible from a set of "Quickie Headlines", with one headline given for each subject. The champion could pass if he/she could not identify the subject, and there was no limit as to how many subjects could be played. $10 was given for each correctly identified subject.

== Night of Champions ==
At the end of each season, the nine highest scorers of that season would compete against each other in a tournament-style format. The top three winners would then compete in a "Night of Champions", where the winner would take home two special bonus prizes including a trip, a car, a boat, etc.

== Quickie Headline ==
At the end of each episode, Perry asked a "Quickie Headline" to the home audience, for which the answer appeared during the end credits.
