= Matches 'n Mates =

1967 American game show

- Presented by: Art James
- Announcer: Bob McLean; Dave Michaels
- Country of origin: United States
- No. of episodes: 130

Production
- Running time: 30 minutes
- Production companies: Nicholson-Muir Productions; Taft Broadcasting

Original release
- Network: Syndication
- Release: January 16, 1967 – September 1968

Matches 'n Mates is an American game show hosted by Art James that aired in first-run syndication from 1967 to 1968.

Developed by Taft Broadcasting and produced by Nick Nicholson and E. Roger Muir, this was the first of four programs Nicholson and Muir agreed to make with the broadcaster. Unlike most syndicated game shows of the era which were normally filmed in Los Angeles or New York City, Matches 'n Mates was taped at WJW-TV in Cleveland, Ohio, and at WAGA-TV in Atlanta, Georgia, throughout 1967. The show was developed in late 1966 in a weekly format at WDAF-TV, Taft's station in Kansas City, Missouri. 20th Century-Fox Television served as distributor.

Personnel from WJW and WAGA assisted in the show's production. WJW announcer Bob McLean (later the host of a variety show for CBC Television) announced the Cleveland tapings, while WAGA announcer Dave Michaels announced the Atlanta tapings.

== Gameplay ==
Matches 'n Mates was a word game in which two husband and wife teams attempted to match questions to answers in order to reveal letters of a mystery word called the "Hidden Item". One member of each couple, in turn, calls out a letter between "A" and "I" and an incomplete statement was read ("To paint a fence you would use..."). The other member called out one of twelve numbers, each representing a different answer. If the statement and answer matched, a letter or space was revealed on the nine-space Hidden Item Board. The first team to identify a Hidden Item won the round, and the first team to win three rounds won the game and a bonus prize.

== Episode status ==
Approximately 130 episodes were taped and distributed by 20th Century-Fox Television.
