= The Shopping Game =

American game show

The Shopping Game is an American game show created and produced by Nick Nicholson and E. Roger Muir that aired on the Satellite Program Network (SPN).

The program aired mainly during 1982, and was taped in Nashville, TN and hosted by Art James with co-host Elyse Brown.
