= Definition (game show) =

Canadian game show

- Genre: Game show
- Created by: Nick Nicholson and E. Roger Muir
- Directed by: Michael Hooey; Elena Jasechko
- Presented by: Bob McLean; Jim Perry
- Narrated by: Jim Perry; Dave Devall; Peter Henderson; Nick Hollinrake
- Opening theme: "Soul Bossa Nova"
- Composer: Quincy Jones
- Country of origin: Canada
- Original language: English
- No. of seasons: 15
- No. of episodes: 1,950

Production
- Executive producer: Gerry Rochon
- Producers: Bill Burrows; Romy Hewitt; Rick Watts
- Production locations: 9 Channel Nine Court; Scarborough, Ontario
- Production company: Glen-Warren Productions

Original release
- Network: CTV
- Release: September 9, 1974 – March 10, 1989

Definition is a Canadian game show, which aired on CTV from September 9, 1974, to March 10, 1989, and recorded at its flagship studios of CFTO-TV at 9 Channel Nine Court in Scarborough, Toronto, Ontario. For most of its run, it was hosted by Jim Perry.

== History ==
Nick Nicholson and E. Roger Muir, the creators of The Newlywed Game, created Definition, resulting in the show being syndicated for some international audiences as well. The series was produced by Glen-Warren Productions for CTV.

For the first four weeks, the show was hosted by Bob McLean, with Jim Perry as announcer. Beginning with the fifth week, and continuing until the series concluded, Perry moved in front of the camera to take over as emcee, with veteran Toronto weatherman Dave Devall filling the vacancy in the announcer's booth. Devall also served as Perry's stand-in whenever he was absent.

Definition was one of the longest-running game shows in Canada and helped secure venerable host Jim Perry his iconic status. Only about 850 of its 1,950 episodes still exist, due to a then-common practice known as wiping.

Beginning in the 1980s, Definition encouraged viewers to send in their own puzzles via mail, with at least one chosen per episode. Viewers would have their definitions acknowledged on air by Perry if they were chosen.

== Rules ==
Definition's format was loosely based on the word game Hangman. Two teams of two competed, originally a contestant and celebrity and from 1986 on two pairs of regular contestants. The teams would take turns guessing letters in a phrase for which Perry had offered a pun as a clue. The game is similar to Wheel of Fortune, which debuted around the same time.

The challengers began the game with one teammate "giving away" a letter to their opponents that they believed was not in the puzzle. If they were correct, the other teammate "took" a letter that they believed was in the puzzle. If this guess was also correct, all instances of the letter were revealed and the team could try to solve the puzzle.

A team lost control if any of the following occurred:

- They failed to guess the puzzle.
- They took a letter that was not in the puzzle.
- They gave away a letter that was in the puzzle. In this case, the opponents could take a free guess before starting their turn.

If, at any point in the game, there were no more letters that could be successfully given away, each team would simply take a letter and offer a guess until one of them solved the puzzle.

The first team to solve two puzzles – changed to three in 1986 – won a prize and advanced to a bonus game. For this round, the champions faced one final definition in which the letters would be revealed one by one in alphabetical order. Solving the puzzle awarded $10 for every unrevealed letter, while failing to do so awarded $10 as a consolation prize (if time was called in the middle of a bonus round, the champions were automatically awarded whatever money was still up for grabs at that point). Champions are limited to 5 matches, and if the team wins their fifth match, they win a bigger prize, such as a refrigerator. 5 time champions are also qualified for the Tournament of Champions at the end of the season. When civilian/celebrity teams played, the civilian member of the champion team switched celebrity partners for the next game.

The show was frequently mocked, as were most Canadian game shows at the time, for the cheapness of its prizes, which were typically courtesy gifts such as small appliances. Only in its annual "Tournament of Champions" did the show typically offer major prizes such as new cars. A 2008 article in the National Post by Canadian television historian Peter Kenter claimed that most prizes were in fact overstock products from a retail warehouse; according to Kenter, who was a contestant on the show in 1987, he did not actually know what his prize would be until it was delivered to his home several weeks after taping, as even the producers had no knowledge of what the prizes would be during production, and the on-air prize announcement was actually a later overdub.

== Theme music ==
The show's theme song was taken from "Soul Bossa Nova", an instrumental jazz piece by Quincy Jones. Later seasons of Definition used a new arrangement of the song which was not as readily recognizable.

The program's use of "Soul Bossa Nova" led both to the Canadian hip hop band Dream Warriors sampling the song for their hit "My Definition of a Boombastic Jazz Style", and to comedian Mike Myers using the song as the theme tune to his James Bond parody film series Austin Powers.

== Adaptations ==
A British version of Definition aired on the ITV network from 15 July 1978 until 27 August 1985, produced by HTV West and was originally hosted by Don Moss and then by Jeremy Beadle. Theme music was provided by guitarist Wout Steenhuis. British audiences were also able to witness the Jim Perry-hosted version when it aired on UK cable station, Living TV (formerly UK Living) in the 1990s. Don Moss also appeared as a celebrity guest player on Canada's original version.

== Home Game ==
Milton Bradley produced a home game for Definition in 1981. It used many of the same components as their two adaptations of the US game show Wheel of Fortune (the game board, cardboard letter tiles, prize cards & play money) but replaced the puzzle book and "wheel" spinner with a set of game puzzle cards and a plastic card holder with translucent red window for the "host" to read the puzzles. The box lists it as the "English Edition", but there is no proof that a French-language version was produced.
