= WPXD-TV =

Television station in Ann Arbor, Michigan

- Ann Arbor–Detroit, Michigan; United States
- City: Ann Arbor, Michigan
- Channels: Digital: 24 (UHF); Virtual: 31

Programming
- Affiliations: 31.1: Ion Television; for others, see § Subchannels

Ownership
- Owner: Inyo Broadcast Holdings; (sale to the E. W. Scripps Company pending); (Inyo Broadcast Licenses LLC)

History
- First air date: January 13, 1981
- Former call signs: WRHT (January 1981); WIHT (February 1981–1989); WBSX (1989–1998)
- Former channel numbers: Analog: 31 (UHF, 1981–2009); Digital: 33 (UHF, until 2009), 31 (UHF, 2009–2012), 50 (UHF, 2012–2020)
- Former affiliations: Independent (1981–1987); In-Home Theater (IT) (1981–1985); Financial News Network (1982); HSN (1987–1998)
- Call sign meaning: Pax TV Detroit (reference to former network branding)

Technical information
- Licensing authority: FCC
- Facility ID: 5800
- ERP: 370 kW
- HAAT: 291 m (955 ft)
- Transmitter coordinates: 42°29′1″N 83°18′44″W

Links
- Public license information: Public file; LMS
- Website: iontelevision.com

WPXD-TV (channel 31) is a television station licensed to Ann Arbor, Michigan, United States, serving as the Ion Television affiliate for the Detroit area. Owned by Inyo Broadcast Holdings, the station broadcasts from a transmitter on West 11 Mile Road in Southfield, Michigan.

Channel 31 in Ann Arbor was inserted in 1973 at the request of Gershom Morningstar, a local resident. His company won a construction permit in 1975 but ran out of time to build the station. Satellite Syndicated Systems bought it from Morningstar and put the station on the air in January 1981 as WRHT, soon changed to WIHT. The station offered a mix of commercial ad-supported programming, chiefly from the company's own Satellite Program Network, and a subscription television service known as In-Home Theater (IT). By late 1982, IT was running for nearly all of the station's broadcast week; this continued until it was discontinued on November 1, 1985. WIHT returned to Satellite Program Network shows as well as some local programming.

In 1987, the station switched its format to home shopping from the Home Shopping Network (HSN). Two years later, it was purchased by Blackstar Communications, a Black-owned firm in which HSN held an equity interest, retaining its program format but changing its call sign to WBSX. Paxson Communications Corporation acquired WBSX in 1997; it aired Paxson's Infomall TV infomercial network before becoming one of the charter stations of the Pax network—now Ion—as WPXD-TV the next year. In 2012, it relocated its transmitter facility from Lyndon Township, where it had been located since signing on the air, to Southfield. Inyo acquired WPXD in 2021 as part of a purchase of conflict stations stemming from the E. W. Scripps Company's purchase of Ion Media.

== History ==
In 1973, Ann Arbor resident Gershom Morningstar, through his Wolverine-Morningstar Broadcasting Company, petitioned the Federal Communications Commission (FCC) to allocate UHF channel 31 to the city. The company then applied for and received a construction permit to build a station on the newly assigned channel, which would be the first since WPAG-TV broadcast in the 1950s. Morningstar believed that the regional coverage of his proposed new station would make it a major outlet, estimating it would cover 80 percent of Michigan's population, with more people than the Philadelphia television market—the nation's fourth largest. In addition to Morningstar, 14 other residents of Washtenaw County and a local bank were involved. The station received the call sign WRHT, but design changes delayed construction of a tower.

FCC delays frustrated Morningstar and delayed construction of channel 31. In February 1979, the commission gave Morningstar an order: sell the construction permit to a new firm within 45 days or lose it. At the end of the period, Southern Satellite of Tulsa, Oklahoma, swooped in to buy the unbuilt WRHT. The company proposed to operate as a hybrid: regular ad-supported commercial programming during the day and subscription television (STV) to paying customers at night, the latter to be programmed by Wometco Home Theater. By October, Southern Satellite had instead decided to program the STV service itself.

Southern Satellite was approved to obtain the construction permit on November 28, 1979; it announced it would build the station's transmitter at the same site proposed by Wolverine-Morningstar, in Lyndon Township along M-52. The FCC granted permission for the subscription service several months later, and by October, construction was in progress. By that time, the name of the subscription service was announced as In-Home Theater, and Southern Satellite had changed its name to Satellite Syndicated Systems (SSS). Kip Farmer, WRHT's first general manager, praised the preparatory work done by Morningstar for accelerating the process of starting the station.

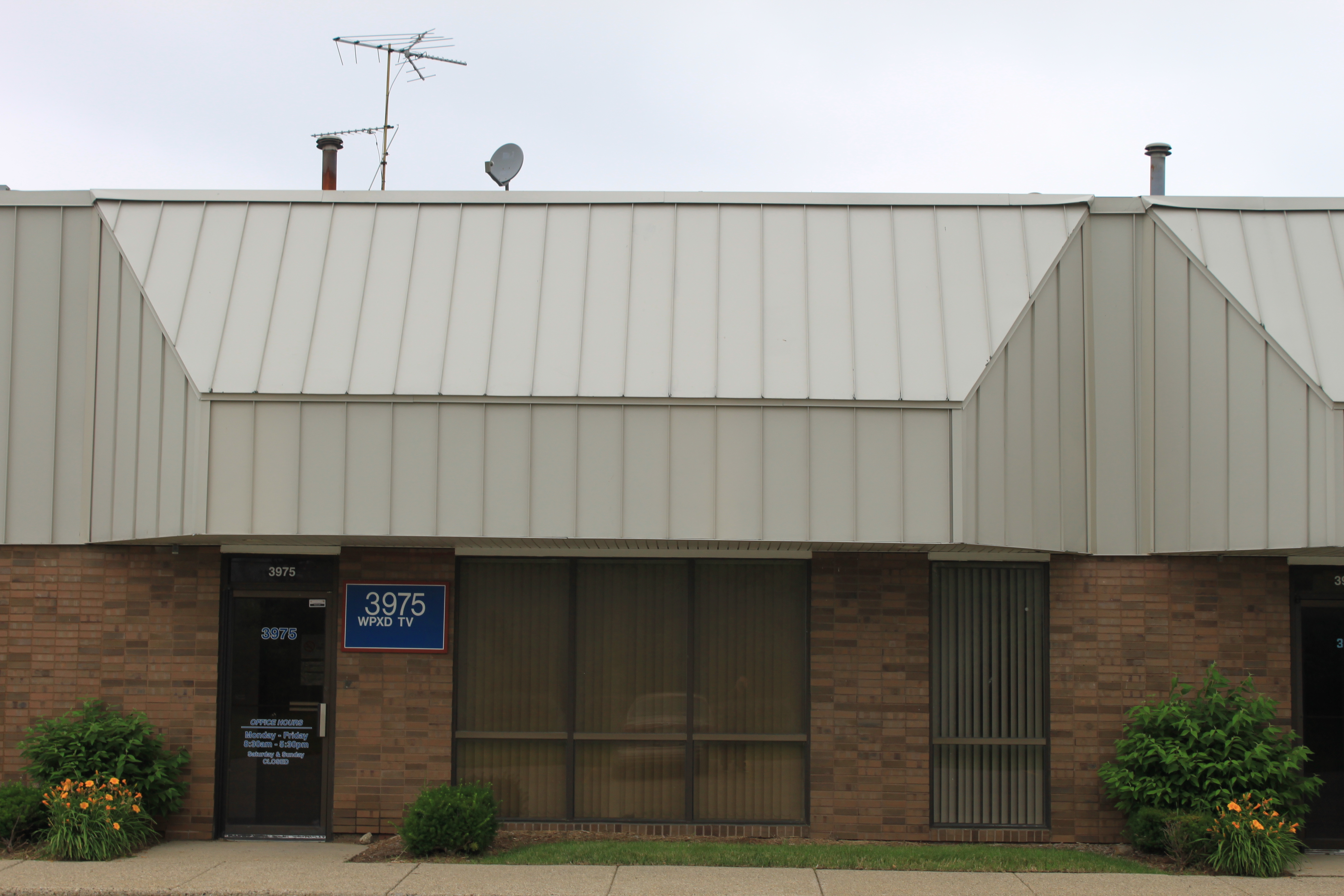
WPXD-TV's offices in Ann Arbor

WRHT signed on the air on January 12 or 13, 1981, held up by cold weather. As the station signed on, SSS applied to change the call sign from WRHT to WIHT; it changed call signs to WIHT on February 1. During the day, WIHT initially offered a mostly low-budget mix of programming highlighted by content from SSS's Satellite Program Network as well as syndicated shows from the Christian Broadcasting Network. Some of the station's local program productions, such as Michigan Press Box, drew on the station's location near the University of Michigan; others included public affairs and interview shows Tavi and This Week. In May 1982, most of the non-local ad-supported programming was dropped and replaced with the Financial News Network (FNN).

At night, channel 31 offered its namesake service, In-Home Theater (IT). This movie service—which in turn contracted with SelecTV—cost $22.95 a month, with an extra $3.95 monthly charge for late-night adult movies. The FNN coverage lasted only a short time. The next month, the FCC abolished the so-called "28-hour rule"—which required stations to provide a minimum of, on average, four hours a day of non-subscription programming. At that time, the service had 14,000 subscribers, well behind the 61,000 of its main competitor, ON TV on Detroit's WXON (channel 20). SSS responded by devoting the vast majority of channel 31's airtime to IT; previously, IT had aired for 14 hours a day. The move also served as an economy measure, as by 1983 the station had 35 full-time employees instead of 80 and could break even with fewer IT subscribers. The station had just one hour a week of local programming, part of the station's six-hour Sunday block of unscrambled programs.

WIHT's main subscription TV competitor, ON TV, left Detroit on March 31, 1983, citing falling subscriber figures, competition from IT and other services, and restricted airtime on WXON. At that time, subscribership to IT was still holding steady at 15,000.

On November 1, 1985, IT ceased broadcasting as cable penetration in the Ann Arbor area rose and subscriptions slowly declined, though the service still had 12,000 paying customers. Once more, SSS programmed the station as an ad-supported independent largely reliant on the Satellite Program Network. The station had little local programming, and viewership was initially low because Ann Arbor's cable system did not offer it. This changed on May 1, 1986, when Toledo, Ohio, public TV station WGTE-TV was removed to make way for channel 31. After a short experiment with locally produced home shopping programming, the station debuted a new local talk show, The Heart of the Matter, in early 1987. During this time, WIHT was one of a handful of broadcast stations to air Electra, a teletext service that Tempo Enterprises (the renamed SSS) jointly owned with Taft Broadcasting.

=== Home shopping ===
Tempo Enterprises dropped most of WIHT's existing programming on September 21, 1987, to carry the Home Shopping Network (HSN), an effort to boost the station's middling revenue performance. This led Ann Arbor's cable system, Columbia Cable, to remove WIHT from its lineup in favor of The Discovery Channel.

In 1988, Tempo Enterprises was acquired by Tele-Communications Inc. (TCI), a major cable system operator. TCI owned cable systems within WIHT's coverage area and could not retain the television station under FCC rules. Tempo divested channel 31 to FAB Communications—owned by Fred Blencowe, a member of the Tempo board of directors—which in turn sold WIHT to Blackstar Enterprises for $4.35 million. Blackstar was owned by John E. Oxendine, a Black entrepreneur from Washington, D.C. The company was no stranger to home shopping; HSN owned 45 percent of its equity, and it ran stations with the format in Florida and Oregon. To match those stations—WBSF-TV and KBSP-TV—Blackstar changed WIHT's call sign to WBSX when the sale was finalized on July 11, 1989, after receiving approval the day before.

=== Pax, i, and Ion ===
Paxson Communications Corporation, the predecessor to Ion Media, acquired WBSX-TV from Blackstar for $35 million in 1997. Paxson owned Infomall TV, an all-infomercial television network. To acquire WBSX-TV, Paxson had to sell an overlapping station in Battle Creek, WJUE-TV. As Paxson converted its Infomall TV stations to the new Pax network on August 31, 1998, the station changed its call sign to WPXD-TV. It also began operating a translator in St. Clair Shores, Michigan, to reach areas of Metro Detroit unserved by the main Ann Arbor signal. (Note: This translator, W48AV, was donated to the Daystar Television Network in 2014.)

In 2001, Paxson Communications entered into a joint sales agreement with Post-Newsweek Stations, owner of Detroit NBC affiliate WDIV-TV. Under the deal, which also covered two other markets, WDIV sold advertising for WPXD and offered the station replays of its newscasts. After changing its name from Pax to i: Independent Television in 2005, the network became known as Ion Television in 2007.

WPXD was one of two Detroit-market stations, along with WMYD, to terminate analog broadcasting on the original digital transition date of February 17, 2009. The station was assigned channel 31 for post-transition operations.

During October 2008, the FCC accepted WPXD-TV's petition to move its digital signal to channel 19, broadcasting at 1,000 kW from the Southfield transmitter tower used by WKBD-TV (channel 50) and vastly increasing its coverage in Metro Detroit and Windsor. However, on March 20, 2009, the FCC and the Canadian Radio-television and Telecommunications Commission (CRTC) denied the application to move the channel 19 allocation from Ann Arbor to Detroit and to move its transmitter to Southfield, in order to protect a transmitter in London, Ontario, which also broadcast on channel 19. After this, WPXD-TV requested to use channel 50. It moved to Southfield on the new channel in July 2012.

The E. W. Scripps Company acquired Ion Media for $2.65 billion in 2020. As it already owned WXYZ-TV and WMYD in the Detroit market, it could not keep WPXD-TV. Twenty-three stations in such positions were sold to Inyo Broadcast Holdings in a transaction that closed at the start of 2021.

Scripps announced its repurchase of all Inyo stations on February 26, 2026.

== Subchannels ==
WPXD-TV broadcasts from a transmitter on West 11 Mile Road in Southfield, Michigan. The station's signal is multiplexed:

Subchannels of WPXD-TV
Subchannel	Res.	Short name	Programming
31.1	720p	ION	Ion Television
31.2	480i	IONPlus	Ion Plus
31.3	480i	Grit	Grit
31.4	480i	DEFY	Defy
31.5	480i	BUSTED	Busted
31.6	480i	Get TV	Great
31.7	480i	GameSho	Game Show Central (4:3)
31.8	480i	HSN	HSN
31.9	480i	HSN2	HSN2

== See also ==
- Media in Detroit
