= 1975 in television =

The year 1975 involved some significant events in television. Below is a list of television-related events which happened that year.

== Events ==
- January 3
  - The original Jeopardy! ends its run after almost 11 years and 2,753 episodes on NBC
  - Also on NBC, the biggest prize in American daytime television game shows at the time is won on Jackpot, $38,750, split between two contestants
- January 6
  - Another World becomes the first American soap opera to start airing hour-long telecasts
  - Wheel of Fortune airs its first episode on NBC's daytime schedule with host Chuck Woolery and assistant Susan Stafford
  - ORTF is split-up into 7 companies: TF1, Antenne 2, FR3, INA, SFP, Radio France & TDF
- January 11 – On All in the Family (CBS), a tearful Edith Bunker says goodbye to her neighbor Louise Jefferson as The Jeffersons moves on up to their own sitcom
- March 1 – "C-Day" in Australia: Full-time color television production takes effect today
- March 4
  - The first People's Choice Awards presentation on CBS
  - Television cameras are first permitted in the Parliament of Canada
- March 18 – McLean Stevenson's character dies in the M*A*S*H episode "Abyssinia, Henry", its third season finale
  - The pilot episode of The Muppet Show airs on ABC introducing Jim Henson's characters to Prime Time with adult humor.
- April 1 – The New Zealand Broadcasting Corporation is dissolved; NZBC TV is renamed Television One
- April 3 – Meg Richardson (Noele Gordon) marries Hugh Mortimer (John Bentley) on British soap opera Crossroads
- April 4 - The pilot episode of "Black Bart" is aired on CBS, based on the same screenplay that became "Blazing Saddles"
- April 5 – The Super Sentai series makes its debut on TV Asahi with Himitsu Sentai Gorenger
- April 12 – On The Jeffersons, Mike Evans makes his last appearance (until 1979), with Damon Evans (no relation to Michael) joining the cast
- April 21 – Days of Our Lives becomes the second American soap opera to expand from thirty minutes to an hour in length
- April 25 – Alice Cooper: The Nightmare airs on ABC
- April 28 – Tom Snyder interviews John Lennon on NBC's The Tomorrow Show
- June 5 – Fred Silverman becomes the head of ABC Entertainment, whose programming choices resulted in ABC achieving ratings dominance (and initiating an era of what is disparagingly called "T&A" or "Jiggle television")
- June 30 – TV2 launches in New Zealand, becoming the country's second television network
- September 5 – A bomb explodes in the wine bar/delicatessen on Australian soap opera Number 96 in an attempt to shake up the cast and earn back lost viewers
- September 8 – In the United States:
  - The Price is Right is expanded to an hour in length, with six games and two Showcase Showdowns, for one week as an experiment; the format is made permanent two months later
  - Match Game starts airing weekly episodes in syndicated primetime as Match Game PM
- September 29 – WGPR-TV, channel 62 in Detroit, becomes the first television station in the U.S. to be owned and operated by blacks (It later becomes CBS-owned WWJ-TV)
- October 1 (10:00 a.m. local time; September 30 in the Americas) – Home Box Office cable television becomes the first pay-per-view television network to deliver a continuous signal via satellite by broadcasting the "Thrilla in Manila" boxing title fight (in which Muhammad Ali defeats Joe Frazier in Manila, Philippines) live to the United States. The fight is watched live by well over 100 million and perhaps as many as one billion viewers worldwide including the 500,000 on HBO and 100 million viewers watching on closed-circuit theatre television. It is broadcast in the Philippines by KBS and in the United Kingdom by the BBC
- October 11 – The premiere episode of Saturday Night Live is broadcast on NBC
- October 16 – The "Balibo Five" Australian television journalists are killed at Balibo by Indonesian Army special forces in the buildup to the Indonesian invasion of East Timor
- October 21 – NBC broadcasts the now legendary 12-inning long sixth game of the World Series between the Boston Red Sox and Cincinnati Reds. The game ends with Boston catcher Carlton Fisk's home run to send the series to a climatic seventh game. In what becomes an iconic baseball film highlight, the NBC left-field game camera catches Fisk wildly waving his arms to his right after hitting the ball and watching its path while drifting down the first base line, as if he is trying to coax the ball to "stay fair". The ball indeed stays fair and the Red Sox tie the Series. (According to the NBC cameraman Lou Gerard, located inside the left field wall scoreboard, cameramen at this time are instructed to follow the flight of the ball. Instead, Gerard is distracted by a rat nearby, thus he loses track of the baseball and instead decides to capture the image of Fisk "magically" waving the ball fair). The game is ranked Number 1 in MLB Network's 20 Greatest Games.
- October 25 – The classic "Chuckles Bites the Dust" episode of The Mary Tyler Moore Show airs on CBS
- October 28 – A James Bond film is shown on British television for the first time, Dr. No on ITV
- November – Sony introduces the Betamax video recorder in the US, which comes in a teakwood console with a 19" color TV set and retails for $2,495
- November 7 – The New Original Wonder Woman TV movie airs as a pilot for the series Wonder Woman (which premieres in 1976)
- November 10 – The Guiding Light on CBS changes its name to Guiding Light, in an attempt to modernize the show's image (The show's announcer, however, continues to call the series The Guiding Light in his announcements until the early 1980s)
- November 23 – Memories of the "Heidi Game" return to haunt NBC as that network is forced to join Willy Wonka & the Chocolate Factory in progress at the conclusion of an overtime NFL game
- December 1 – Top-rated As the World Turns, bowing to competition from NBC, expands to one hour in length; The Edge of Night moves to ABC
- December 25 – World television premiere of Butch Cassidy and the Sundance Kid, on BBC1

== Programs ==
- 60 Minutes (1968–present)
- All in the Family (1971–1979)
- All My Children (1970–2011)
- American Bandstand (1952–1989)
- Another World (1964–1999)
- Are You Being Served? (UK) (1972–1985)
- As the World Turns (1956–2010)
- Aşk-ı Memnu (Turkey) (1975)
- Barnaby Jones (1973–1980)
- Blue Peter (UK) (1958–present)
- Bozo the Clown (1949–present)
- Candid Camera (1948–present)
- Captain Kangaroo (1955–1984)
- Chico and the Man (1974–1978)
- Columbo (1971–1978)
- Come Dancing (UK) (1949–1995)
- Coronation Street, UK (1960–present)
- Countdown (Australia) (1974–1987)
- Crossroads, UK (1964–1988, 2001–2003)
- Dad's Army (UK) (1968–1977)
- Days of Our Lives (1965–present)
- Dean Martin Celebrity Roast (1974–1984)
- Derrick (1974–1998)
- Dinah! (1974–1980)
- Dixon of Dock Green (UK) (1955–1976)
- Doctor Who, UK (1963–1989, 1996, 2005–present)
- Emergency! (1972–1977)
- Emmerdale Farm (UK) (1972–present)
- Face the Nation (1954–present)
- Fat Albert and the Cosby Kids (1972–1984)
- Four Corners, Australia (1961–present)
- General Hospital (1963–present)
- Get Some In! (UK) (1975–78)
- Good Times (1974–1979)
- Grandstand (UK) (1958–2007)
- Hallmark Hall of Fame (1951–present)
- Happy Days (1974–1984)
- Hawaii Five-O (1968–1980)
- Hee Haw (1969–1993)
- Hockey Night in Canada (1952–present)
- It's Academic (1961–present)
- John Craven's Newsround (UK) (1972–present)
- Kaynanalar (Turkey) (1974–2004)
- Kojak (1973–1978, 2005–present)
- Land of the Lost (1974–1977)
- Last of the Summer Wine (UK) (1973–present)
- Little House on the Prairie (1974–1983)
- Love of Life (1951–1980)
- Magpie (UK) (1968–1980)
- Marcus Welby, M.D. (1969–1976)
- Mary Tyler Moore (1970–1977)
- M*A*S*H (1972–1983)
- Masterpiece Theatre (1971–present)
- Match Game (1962–1969, 1973–1984, 1990–1991, 1998–1999)
- Maude (1972–1978)
- McCloud (1970–1977)
- McMillan & Wife (1971–1977)
- Meet the Press (1947–present)
- Monday Night Football (1970–present)
- Mutual of Omaha's Wild Kingdom (1963–1988, 2002–present)
- Old Grey Whistle Test (UK) (1971–1987)
- One Life to Live (1968–2012)
- Opportunity Knocks (UK) (1956–1978)
- Panorama (UK) (1953–present)
- Play for Today (UK) (1970–1984)
- Play School (1966–present)
- Police Woman (1974–1978)
- Rhoda (1974–1978)
- Sanford and Son (1972–1977)
- Schoolhouse Rock! (1973–1986)
- Search for Tomorrow (1951–1986)
- Sesame Street (1969–present)
- Soul Train (1971–2008)
- Superstars (UK) (1973–1985, 2003–2005)
- Tattletales (1974–1978, 1982–1984)
- The Benny Hill Show (UK) (1969–1989)
- The Bionic Woman (1976–1978)
- The Bob Newhart Show (1972–1978)
- The Carol Burnett Show (1967–1978)
- The Doctors (1963–1982)
- The Edge of Night (1956–1984)
- The Good Old Days (UK) (1953–1983)
- The Guiding Light (1952–2009)
- The Late Late Show, Ireland (1962–present)
- The Lawrence Welk Show (1955–1982)
- The Mike Douglas Show (1961–1981)
- The Money Programme (UK) (1966–present)
- The Price Is Right (1972–present)
- The Rockford Files (1974–1980)
- The Six Million Dollar Man (1973–1978)
- The Sky at Night (UK) (1957–present)
- The Today Show (1952–present)
- The Tomorrow Show (1973–1982)
- The Tonight Show (1954–present)
- The Waltons (1972–1981)
- The Wonderful World of Disney (1954–present; 1969–79 with this title)
- The Young and the Restless (1973–present)
- This Is Your Life (UK) (1955–2003)
- Tiswas (UK) (1974–1982)
- Tom and Jerry (1965–1972, 1975–1977, 1980–1982)
- Top of the Pops, UK (1964–2006)
- Truth or Consequences (1950–1988)
- What the Papers Say (UK) (1956–present)
- Wide World of Sports (1961–1997)
- Wish You Were Here...? (UK) (1974–present)
- World of Sport, UK (1965–1985)
- Z-Cars, UK (1962–1978)

== Debuts ==
- Bel Ami – (Debut on TVP1 in Poland)
- January 2 – The Sweeney on ITV in the UK (1975–78)
- January 5 -
- January 6
  - Wheel of Fortune on NBC's daytime lineup (1975–89)
  - Blank Check the same day, also on NBC, and lasts 26 weeks
- January 17 – Baretta, starring Robert Blake, on ABC (1975–78)
- January 18 – The Jeffersons, a spinoff of All in the Family, on CBS (1975–85)
- January 23 – Barney Miller on ABC (1975–82)
- January 30 – Archer on NBC (1975)
- February 17 – S.W.A.T. on ABC (1975–76)
- April 4 – The Good Life on BBC1 in the UK (1975–78)
- April 5 – Himitsu Sentai Gorenger on TV Asahi (formerly NET) in Japan (1975–77)
- April 16 – Survivors on BBC1 (1975–77)
- April 21 – Blankety Blanks on ABC's daytime lineup
- May 8 – The Don Lane Show on the Nine Network in Australia (1975–83)
- May 31 – Jim'll Fix It on BBC1 (1975–94)
- June 16 – Spin-Off and Musical Chairs on CBS's daytime lineup
- June 30 – Showoffs on ABC's daytime lineup
- July 7
  - Ryan's Hope on ABC's daytime lineup (1975–89)
  - Rhyme and Reason the same day, also on ABC's daytime lineup
  - The Magnificent Marble Machine, on NBC's daytime lineup, from the same host who brought Blank Check
- September 2 – Runaround on ITV (1975–81)
- September 4
  - The Bobby Vinton Show on CTV in Canada and across the U.S. in syndication (1975–78)
  - Space: 1999 (syndicated 1975–77)
- September 6
  - Hanna-Barbera's The New Tom and Jerry/Grape Ape Show on ABC Saturday Morning (1975–76)
  - Supersonic, a pop music program, on London Weekend Television (1975–77)
  - Funny Farm – (CTV, 1975–80)
- September 8
  - Phyllis, a spin-off of The Mary Tyler Moore Show on CBS (1975–77)
  - Match Game PM (1975–82)
  - Give-n-Take on CBS's daytime lineup
- September 9
  - Welcome Back, Kotter on ABC (1975–79)
  - Shades of Greene on Thames Television in the UK (1975–76)
- September 14 – Three for the Road on CBS and ends promptly on November 30
- September 15 – The Fifth Estate on CBC (1975–present)
- September 19 – Fawlty Towers on BBC Two in the UK (1975, 1979)
- September 25 – King of Kensington on CBC (1975–80)
- September 29 – Three for the Money on NBC's daytime lineup and it lasts only nine weeks
- October 1 – Arena on BBC2 in the UK (1975–present)
- October 11 – Saturday Night Live (1975–present)
- November 3 – Good Morning America on ABC with co-anchors David Hartman and Nancy Dussault (1975–present)
- November 16 - Donny & Marie (1976 TV series)
- November 7 – Wonder Woman on ABC (1975–79)
- November 30 – McCoy on NBC (1975–76)
- December 16 – One Day at a Time, produced by Norman Lear, on CBS (1975–84)

== Ending this year ==
Date	Show	Debut
January 3	Jeopardy! (returned in 1984)	1964
January 4	Paul Sand in Friends and Lovers	1974
January 16	Ironside	1967
March 7	The Odd Couple	1970
March 28	Ultraman Leo (Japan)	1974
March 28	Kolchak: The Night Stalker	1974
March 31	Gunsmoke	1955
April 13	Mannix	1967
April 18	How to Survive a Marriage	1974
April 26	Kung Fu	1972
May 20	Adam-12	1968
June 13	Now You See It (returned in 1989)	1974
June 13	The Joker's Wild (returned in 1977)	1972
June 27	Split Second (returned in 1986)	1972
June 27	Password (returned in 1979 as Password Plus)	1961
August 1	Death Valley Days	1952
September 5	What's My Line?	1950
September 26	Jackpot (returned in 1985)	1974

== Changes of network affiliation ==
Show	Moved from	Moved to
The Edge of Night	CBS	ABC
The Bugs Bunny Show	ABC	CBS

== Births ==
Date	Name	Notability
January 2	Dax Shepard	Actor (Parenthood)
January 3	Danica McKellar	Actress (The Wonder Years, Young Justice, Static Shock)
January 3	Jason Marsden	Actor (Adventures of the Gummi Bears, Boy Meets World, The Weekenders, Static Shock, Justice League, The Fairly OddParents, Kim Possible, Loonatics Unleashed, Generator Rex)
January 4	Jill Marie Jones	Actress (Girlfriends)
January 5	Bradley Cooper	Actor (Alias)
January 7	Stephanie Birkitt	American attorney
January 9	Patrick Sabongui	Canadian actor (The Flash)
January 12	Lisa Rieffel	Actress
January 17	Freddy Rodriguez	Actor (Six Feet Under, The Night Shift)
January 23	Tito Ortiz	Mixed martial artist
January 28	Terri Conn	Actress (As the World Turns, One Life to Live)
January 29	Sharif Atkins	Actor (ER, White Collar)
January 29	Sara Gilbert	Actress (Roseanne, The Talk)
February 11	Nischelle Turner	TV host
February 18	Sarah Joy Brown	Actress (General Hospital)
February 22	Drew Barrymore	Actress and producer (Saturday Night Live, Santa Clarita Diet, The Drew Barrymore Show)
February 23	Michael Cornacchia	Actor (Legion of Super Heroes, The Kids Are Alright)
February 25	Chelsea Handler	Actress and producer
February 27	Christina Nigra	Actress (Out of This World)
March 1	Shane Johnson	Actor
March 2	Jesse Bochco	Producer
March 5	Jolene Blalock	Actress and model (Star Trek: Enterprise)
March 7	Audrey Marie Anderson	Actress (Once and Again, The Unit, Arrow)
March 7	T. J. Thyne	Actor (Bones)
March 9	Chaske Spencer	Actor
March 12	Marc Menard	Canadian actor (All My Children, House, Watch Over Me)
March 15	Eva Longoria	Actress (Desperate Housewives)
March 15	will.i.am	Rapper
March 17	Test	Pro wrestler (died 2009)
March 17	Tracy Wolfson	Sportscaster
March 22	Guillermo Diaz	Actor (Weeds)
March 21	Justin Pierce	Actor (died 2000)
March 27	Fergie	Rapper and singer
April 2	Adam Rodriguez	Actor (CSI: Miami, Criminal Minds)
April 2	Deedee Magno Hall	Filipino-American actress (Pearl on Steven Universe)
April 3	Aries Spears	Comedian and actor (Mad TV)
April 5	Mike Bloom	Musician
April 6	Zach Braff	Actor (Scrubs)
April 14	Antwon Tanner	Actor (One Tree Hill)
April 14	Amy Birnbaum	Voice actress (Pokémon, Sonic X, Kirby: Right Back at Ya!, Magical DoReMi,Yu-Gi-Oh!) and singer
April 14	Anderson Silva	Brazilian mixed martial artist (UFC)
April 14	Lita	Pro wrestler
April 22	Dannah Feinglass	Actress (Mad TV, WordGirl, The Mighty B!, Newsreaders)
April 30	Johnny Galecki	Actor (Roseanne, The Big Bang Theory)
May 3	Christina Hendricks	Actress (Mad Men, Another Period)
May 3	Dulé Hill	Actor (The West Wing, Psych)
May 3	Willie Geist	American television personality
May 8	Wilmer Calderon	Actor (The Shield, Bosch)
May 10	Andrea Anders	Actress (Joey, Better Off Ted)
May 10	Julie Nathanson	Actress (The Zeta Project, Avengers Assemble, Elena of Avalor)
May 11	Coby Bell	Actor (Third Watch, The Game)
May 20	Tahmoh Penikett	Canadian actress (Battlestar Galactica)
May 24	Will Sasso	Canadian actor and comedian (Mad TV)
May 27	Jamie Oliver	English chef and TV host
May 29	Daniel Tosh	Actor and comedian
May 30	CeeLo Green	Musician (The Voice)
June 4	Angelina Jolie	Actress (Gia Carangi on Gia) and daughter of Jon Voight
June 6	Staci Keanan	Actress (My Two Dads, Step by Step)
June 7	Allen Iverson	NBA basketball player
June 10	Isaac Hayes III	Voice actor
June 12	Michael Muhney	Actor (Veronica Mars, The Young and the Restless)
June 14	Laurence Rickard	Actor
June 16	Frederick Koehler	Actor (Kate & Allie, Oz)
June 17	Jennifer Irwin	Canadian actress (Still Standing)
June 17	Lisa Gwilym	Welsh broadcaster
June 24	Carla Gallo	Actress (Carnivàle, Bones)
June 25	Linda Cardellini	Actress (ER, Freaks and Geeks, Mad Men, Regular Show, Gravity Falls, Sanjay and Craig)
June 27	Tobey Maguire	Actor
June 27	Bianca Del Rio	Actor
July 2	Elizabeth Reaser	Actress
July 3	Ryan McPartlin	Actor (Chuck)
July 6	50 Cent	Rapper and actor
July 11	Jon Wellner	Actor (CSI: Crime Scene Investigation)
July 14	Taboo	Actor
July 17	Daffney	Pro wrestler (WCW, TNA) (d. 2021)
July 20	Ray Allen	NBA basketball player
July 20	Judy Greer	Actress (Glenn Martin DDS, Two and a Half Men, Archer, Reluctantly Healthy)
July 24	Eric Szmanda	Actor (CSI: Crime Scene Investigation)
July 24	Laura Fraser	Actress
July 26	Liz Truss	British politician
July 31	Annie Parisse	Actress (Law & Order)
August 5	Ami Foster	Actress (Punky Brewster)
August 7	Charlize Theron	Actress (2-time host of Saturday Night Live)
August 11	Tinsley Mortimer	American television personality
August 16	George Stults	Actor (7th Heaven)
August 18	Kaitlin Olson	Actress (It's Always Sunny in Philadelphia)
August 19	Tracie Thoms	Actress (Cold Case)
August 21	Alicia Witt	Actress and singer (Cybill, Justified)
August 22	Rodrigo Santoro	Brazilian actor (Lost, Westworld)
August 25	Michelle Beaudoin	Canadian actress (Madison, Sabrina the Teenage Witch)
August 29	Dante Basco	Actor (American Dragon: Jake Long, Avatar: The Last Airbender, The Legend of Korra)
August 31	Sara Ramirez	American-Mexican actress (Grey's Anatomy)
September 1	Scott Speedman	British-Canadian actor (Felicity)
September 3	Redfoo	Actor and singer
September 8	Larenz Tate	Actor (The Royal Family, South Central)
September 18	Charlie Finn	Actor (Spud on American Dragon: Jake Long)
September 18	Jason Sudeikis	Actor and comedian (Saturday Night Live)
September 22	Mireille Enos	Actress (The Killing, The Catch)
September 23	Jaime Bergman	Actress
October 3	India Arie	Singer
October 3	Alanna Ubach	Actress (Teamo Supremo, Ozzy & Drix, Brandy & Mr. Whiskers, El Tigre: The Adventures of Manny Rivera)
October 4	Reggie Lee	Filipino-American actor (Prison Break, Grimm)
October 5	Kate Winslet	English actress (Mildred Pierce)
October 5	Parminder Nagra	British actress (ER)
October 5	Scott Weinger	Actor (Full House, Aladdin, Fuller House)
October 7	Rhyno	Pro wrestler
October 8	Terryn Westbrook	Actress and singer
October 11	Nat Faxon	Actor (Ben and Kate)
October 12	Marion Jones	WNBA player
October 16	Kellie Martin	Actress (Life Goes On, Christy, ER)
October 22	Jesse Tyler Ferguson	Actor (Modern Family)
October 23	Boti Bliss	Actress (CSI: Miami)
October 23	Michelle Beadle	American sports reporter
October 26	Paula Faris	Television correspondent
October 30	Steve Kazee	Actor
November 1	Bo Bice	American singer (American Idol)
November 2	Danny Cooksey	Actor (Diff'rent Strokes, The Cavanaughs, Tiny Toon Adventures, Static Shock, Pepper Ann, Xiaolin Showdown, Dave the Barbarian, Kick Buttowski: Suburban Daredevil)
November 4	Heather Tom	Actress
November 4	Curtis Stone	Australian celebrity chef
November 12	Angela Watson	Model and actress (Step by Step)
November 11	Angélica Vale	Actress
November 17	Diane Neal	Actress (Law & Order: Special Victims Unit)
November 20	Joshua Gomez	Actor (Chuck)
November 21	Cherie Johnson	Actress (Punky Brewster, Family Matters)
November 30	Richard Bacon	English television and radio presenter
December 1	David Hornsby	Actor (It's Always Sunny in Philadelphia, Fanboy & Chum Chum, Ben 10)
December 8	Celia Walden	British journalist
December 10	Emmanuelle Chriqui	Canadian actress (Entourage, Cleaners)
December 12	Mayim Bialik	Actress (Blossom, The Big Bang Theory) and singer
December 13	James Kyson	South Korean-born American actor (Heroes)
December 14	KaDee Strickland	Actress (Private Practice)
December 17	Milla Jovovich	Actress
December 18	Trish Stratus	Pro wrestler (Canada's Got Talent)
December 24	Stephanie Ruhle	Journalist
December 27	Heather O'Rourke	Actress (Happy Days) (d. 1988)
December 28	Tannis Vallely	Director and actress (Head of the Class)
December 29	Shawn Hatosy	Actor (Southland)
December 30	Tiger Woods	Pro golfer

== Deaths ==
Date	Name	Age	Notability
January 24	Larry Fine	72	American comic actor (Three Stooges)
May 4	Moe Howard	77	American comic actor (Three Stooges)
June 3	Ozzie Nelson	69	American actor (The Adventures of Ozzie and Harriet)
June 28	Rod Serling	50	Television writer and creator of (The Twilight Zone (1959–64) and Night Gallery (1969–73))
July 2	Audrey Maas	40	Television writer and producer (DuPont Show of the Month, Eleanor and Franklin)

== Television debuts ==
- Armand Assante – How to Survive a Marriage
- John Belushi – Saturday Night Live
- Richard Belzer – Saturday Night Live
- Tom Berenger – One Life to Live
- Bill Cobbs – First Ladies Diaries: Rachel Jackson
- Billy Connolly – Play for Today
- Billy Crystal – Keep On Truckin'
- Jeff Goldblum – Columbo
- Patrick Gorman – Ourstory
- John Heard – Valley Forge
- Amy Irving – The Rookies
- Maurice LaMarche – Sidestreet
- Marc McClure – Emergency!
- Bill Murray – Saturday Night Live with Howard Cosell
- Catherine O'Hara – The Wayne & Shuster Show
- Pete Postlethwaite – Second City Firsts
- Ron Silver – McMillan & Wife
- Sylvester Stallone – Police Story
- Julie Walters – Second City Firsts
- Dianne Wiest – Zalmen: or, the Madness of God
- Tom Wilkinson – 2nd House
- Ray Winstone – You and the World

== See also ==
- 1975–76 United States network television schedule
