= Pay Cards! =

- Also known as: (Super) Pay Cards!
- Created by: Nick Nicholson; E. Roger Muir
- Presented by: Art James (1968–1969, 1981–1982); Paul Hanover (1973–1975, Canada only) with Mary Lou Basaraba (1981–1982)
- Announcer: Fred Collins (1968); Glenn Ryle (1968); Jerry Thomas (1969); Mary Lou Basaraba (1981–1982)
- Countries of origin: United States (1968–1969); Canada (1973–1975, 1981–1982)
- No. of episodes: 260 (1968–1969) unknown (1973-1975); 150 (1981–1982)

Production
- Running time: 22 minutes
- Production company: Nicholson-Muir Productions

Original release
- Network: Syndicated (daily)
- Release: September 9, 1968 – September 5, 1969
- Release: 1973 – 1975
- Release: September 14, 1981 – April 23, 1982

Pay Cards! is an American syndicated game show created and produced by Nick Nicholson and E. Roger Muir that first aired from 1968–1969. A revival recorded in Canada, titled Super Pay Cards!, ran from 1981–1982. Both series were hosted by Art James. The original Pay Cards! taped in both New York City and Cincinnati, Ohio, while Super Pay Cards! was taped in Montreal. Another Canadian version, hosted by Paul Hanover and also recorded in Montreal, aired from 1973 until 1975.

== Pay Cards! (1968–1969, original) ==
Three players, one of whom was a celebrity playing for a studio audience member, attempted to build poker hands from a board of 20 hidden cards.

=== Five Card Draw ===
In the first round, the first player called out three cards to reveal. If a pair or three of a kind came up, the player was required to keep those cards. If not, the player had the decision to either keep the cards or turn them back and pass control to the next player. If the cards were kept, that player called out a fourth card. If he or she chose to keep it, the process repeated for the fifth card. However, if he or she refused the fourth or fifth card, control passed to the next player.

After two players each completed a five-card hand, the remaining player was required to complete his or her hand by keeping whichever cards he or she revealed immediately thereafter.

At the end of each round, the players received money based on the rank of their poker hands.

Payout	Hand
$10	Each Pair
$30	Three of a Kind
$50	Full House
$100	Four of a Kind
$150	Five of a Kind

Straights and flushes did not count; if a player had two pairs, he or she received double the payout for a single pair.

The player with the best hand at the end of each round received a $50 bonus. Whoever had the most money at the end of the third round played the bonus round; if there was a tie, a sudden-death draw-off of one card was dealt, with the champion determined by higher rank, plus $50. All players kept their money.

=== Strategy Round ===
The four corner cards were revealed at the start of the round. On their first two turns, each player called out two more cards and selected two cards for his or her hand from the six which were showing. After a player collected four cards, that player selected one last card to complete his or her hand.

=== Wild Card Round ===
This final round was played similar to Five Card Draw but also included Wild Cards hidden among the others on the board. This allowed a player to make a hand of Five of a Kind and thereby earn $150.

=== Jackpot Game ===
The player attempted to memorize twelve cards and their positions for twelve seconds. The cards were then concealed and the player spun a wheel to determine which card he or she must locate on the board. If the player recalled where that specific card was located on the board, he or she won a bonus prize.

== Pay Cards! (1973–1975, first revival) ==
According to a Canadian website, the 1973-1975 revival of the game for Canadian television was played almost identically to the American original. Paul Hanover, a long-tenured Hamilton, Ontario radio personality, hosted this version and would helm several other games on the CTV network.

== Super Pay Cards! (1981–1982, second revival) ==
A new version, titled Super Pay Cards!, aired on CTV and, in the United States, in syndication again with Art James as host. Joining James was co-host Mary Lou Basaraba, an actress and musician, with both providing voice-overs in addition to appearing on screen. Overall gameplay remained similar to the first two iterations. However, in this version, only two contestants (always a man against a woman) competed, and faced a board of 16 playing cards instead of 20.

This version was taped in at CFCF-TV Studios in Montreal, Quebec, and featured a musical theme that was a remix of the theme to the 1975 Nicholson-Muir production Spin-Off.

At the end of the third round, the player with the most money became the champion and advanced to the bonus round for a chance to win $5,000. The losing player received a copy of the show's home game in addition to whatever money he or she had earned. If there was a tie, a sudden death draw-off of one card was dealt, and whoever had the higher rank won the championship, plus $50.

=== Five Card Draw ===
Four cards were revealed to the players at the start of the round before being concealed. The player in control selected three cards and attempted to build the best possible five-card hand with them. If a pair or three of a kind was revealed, the player automatically kept the three cards and tried to build the hand. As before, the player selected a fourth card and could keep it or refuse the card and pass control to his or her opponent. The process repeated with the fifth card. This continued until one of the players completed his or her five-card hand, forcing the opponent to complete his/her own without the option to refuse any chosen cards.

Again, players received money based upon the rank of their hands.

Payout	Hand
$20	Each Pair
$50	Three of a Kind
$100	Full House
$200	Four of a Kind
$300	Five of a Kind

As in the original series, a $50 bonus was awarded to the better hand in the round.

=== Round Two ===
Round Two was played in one of four ways.

- Four-of-a-Kind—Four sets of four-of-a-kind were on the board, making it possible for both players to receive $200 in this round.
- Seven Card Stud—Basaraba presented each player a choice of two sets of two cards to see for himself or herself and placed the cards in front of his or her podium. The players used their own two cards and built their hand in the same method as the first round. The two extra cards were not revealed to his or her opponent until both players kept all five cards.
- Two Three Four Five—One set of cards had a fifth (duplicate) in addition to two sets of pairs, a three-of-a-kind set and a four-of-a-kind set.
- Strategy—Three cards were revealed at the start of the hand and remained exposed for the entire round. The players took turns calling off two additional cards and selected two cards from the five showing to add to their hands. Each player on his or her third turn called off one card and selected one from the four displayed to complete his or her hand.

=== Wild Card Hand ===
The Wild Card Hand was played similar to round one, but with one, two, or three jokers shuffled into the cards to make a hand of five-of-a-kind possible.

=== Bonus Round ===
In the first phase of the bonus round, the champion was given four seconds to memorize the location of four cards. After four seconds, the cards were concealed and the champion selected a card from a deck Basaraba was holding. If the champion correctly recalled the location of the chosen card, he or she won $50.

The second phase involved memorizing eight cards for eight seconds. Correctly locating the selected card increased the champion's winnings in the bonus round to $500. If the champion reached the final phase, twelve cards were presented for twelve seconds and the champion won $5,000 for selecting the correct card.

If the champion made an incorrect guess in either the first or second phase, he or she forfeited the chance at the third phase, but could win the lesser amount from that phase with a second guess. The cards were reshuffled and displayed again for either four or eight seconds, depending on the level. The champion kept the $500 from the second phase if he or she made a mistake on the final phase, but did not earn a second chance.

=== Audience Game ===
Basaraba asked a member of the studio audience to study eight cards for eight seconds, then pick one of those eight cards from her hand. The audience member won a prize (e.g., a small appliance) if he or she could recall where that card was located on the board.

This segment was only aired in Canada, as regulations at that time required some Canadian content in the show. The contestants picked for this segment were all residents of Canada. It was edited out of U.S. syndicated showings, cutting directly to the Wild Card Hand.

== Home game ==
Whitman Publishing produced a board game based on Pay Cards in 1969. The game included play money, a vinyl card mat with pockets to hold the game cards, and four game decks: three 20-card decks for main round play (one each with red, orange & green backs) and a 12-card blue-backed deck for the Jackpot Round. Gameplay was simplified in that all three main rounds were played in the "Five Card Draw" format, and all players participated in the Jackpot Round to try to find the chosen card (awarding $200 if the highest-scoring player finds the card, $100 if the second-place player finds it, or $50 if the third-place player finds it). Two different versions of the game were released, both with identical boxes and near-identical contents. The only difference in the latter-released version is the inclusion of Wild Cards in the orange and green card decks (one in each, replacing one card from the earlier release's decks); however, the game rules in this latter version do not allow for a "five of a kind" payoff. (Later "Wild Card" edition printings changed some of the colors on the box cover, but the contents remained the same.)

A board game of Super Pay Cards! was published by Milton Bradley in 1981 and plugged on-air by James (given to all contestants), but there has been no evidence that it was ever mass-released in either Canada or the U.S.

In September 2026, game show historian Christian Carrion revealed via Discord that he had begun work on a version of Super Pay Cards! for the Nintendo Game Boy. The game was released via the indie game site itch.io on September 21, 2026.
