= Jim Perry (television personality) =

American-Canadian television entertainer (1933–2015)

- Perry circa 1980s
- Born: James Edward Dooley; November 9, 1933; Nova Scotia, Canada
- Died: November 20, 2015 (aged 82); Ashland, Oregon, U.S.
- Education: University of Pennsylvania
- Occupations: TV presenter, game show host, singer
- Years active: 1960–1995
- Television: Definition, Card Sharks, $ale of the Century
- Spouse: June Perry (m. 1959)
- Children: 2

James Edward Perry (né Dooley; November 9, 1933 – November 20, 2015) was a Canadian television game show host, singer, announcer, and performer in the 1970s and 1980s.

Perry enjoyed success on both Canadian and American television. He was the host of the American game shows Card Sharks and $ale of the Century, as well as the Canadian game shows Definition and Headline Hunters. Perry was also the host of the Miss Canada pageant in the 1970s and 1980s.

== Early career ==
Perry was born James Edward Dooley in Nova Scotia, Canada, but raised in the United States. His mother, Genevieve Perry, was a record-holding swimmer, as well as a known marathon dancer. His father, Edward Dooley, was a musician. While briefly attending Amador Valley High School in Pleasanton, California, Perry was an outstanding basketball player thanks in part to his height (at 6'4" or 193 cm); he graduated in 1952. He was often nicknamed "Big Jim" because of his height.

Perry started out as a singer in Special Services after college at University of Pennsylvania, working on Armed Forces Radio during the Korean War. After the service, he worked for a short time at General Electric and then replaced Eddie Fisher as the staff vocalist at Grossingers in the Catskill Mountains and later did comedy working with Sid Caesar as his straight man for several years (which included a four-year stint with Caesar in Las Vegas). Perry appeared in three syndicated specials with Caesar titled As Caesar Sees It which aired during the 1962–63 season. These were under his birth name of Jim Dooley. Due to a name conflict with AFTRA, he adopted his mother's maiden name of Perry shortly after beginning his television work.

Perry first tried his hand at game show hosting in 1963, when he hosted a pilot for NBC called Talking Pictures; the pilot, where two teams tried to form words based on an array of pictures shown to them, did not sell.His first series was the Canadian game Fractured Phrases in 1965. Afterwards he presided over several other game shows, including Eye Bet and The Money Makers (also called Bingo at Home), the latter also airing on syndicated television in some US markets for 13 weeks in 1969. Although Perry had American citizenship, he and his family emigrated to Canada in the early 1970s and moved back to the U.S. in the late 1970s when he was hired to host Card Sharks.

Perry also served as an announcer for That Show starring Joan Rivers, a short-lived two-month series that aired in 1969 on syndicated television. He also appeared in a few television commercials, including one for Morton Salt. From 1969 to 1972, he was a weekend overnight DJ and newsreader at WABC radio in New York City. In 1974, Perry became the announcer of the CTV game show Definition, a Hangman-based, pre–Wheel of Fortune series which would become the longest-running game show in Canadian television history. After a few weeks of announcing the show, Perry moved from the announcer position to hosting (replacing original host Bob McLean), and remained there until the show ended its run in 1989. Perry hosted another long-running weekly nighttime game show, Headline Hunters, which lasted from 1972 until 1983.

Perry presided as emcee of the annual Miss Canada Pageant, a job he held from 1967 until 1990, about the same length of time his U.S. counterpart Bob Barker presided over the Miss USA Pageant on CBS. Like Bert Parks in the United States, Perry, a talented singer, would sing the pageant's closing song, "The Fairest Girl in Canada", soon after the new Miss Canada was crowned. This practice, however, ended in the 1980s. Again, Dave Devall worked alongside Perry as the pageant's off-screen announcer. While hosting the 1975 Miss Canada pageant, during a commercial break, a female protester hit Perry with a packet of flour while on camera, claiming that the pageant was sexist. Perry, though shaken from the incident, regained his composure and continued on with the broadcast.

Perry's first major American network hosting tenure came in 1967, with a short-lived charades-type game called It's Your Move. The series was produced in Canada for syndication in the United States. Another game show also produced in Canada for syndicated TV in the U.S., The Moneymakers (a game based on Bingo), aired in 1969, originally titled Bingo at Home, in which contestants and home viewers had a chance to win money (albeit less than $100 at a time) and in some years his co-host was Dominique Dufour, Miss Canada 1981.

== Stardom as an emcee ==
His biggest break in the United States came in 1978 when NBC and Mark Goodson–Bill Todman Productions cast him for their new show Card Sharks. Perry hosted the entire NBC version and the two pilots that preceded the series, airing from April 24, 1978, until October 23, 1981. This series helped Perry begin a long association with NBC, lasting more than a decade. Perry was twice considered as host for the daytime and the nighttime revival of Card Sharks in 1986, but due to his commitments with NBC and CTV, the daytime version aired on CBS and was given to Bob Eubanks, and the nighttime version was hosted by Bill Rafferty.

In 1982, NBC named Perry host of $ale of the Century, a revived version of the 1969–1973 series, airing from January 3, 1983, until March 24, 1989. For more than six seasons, he presided over the fast-paced Q&A game. Starting in January 1985, he added a third hosting gig to his resume, taking the reins of a nightly syndicated $ale of the Century that ran until September 1986.

His style and sensational salesmanship helped to make the show a big hit for the network in game shows, and it made Perry one of the top game show personalities of the 1980s in the United States. Not forgetting the time he spent with Sid Caesar, Perry would often tell jokes related to some of the questions asked on $ale. During his tenure at NBC, Perry appeared in the made-for-TV movie The Great American Traffic Jam (1980) along with fellow game show hosts Wink Martindale, Jack Clark, and Art James.

Perry hosted approximately ten different game shows (including unsold pilots) in a career that spanned about 25 years. He was also involved in charitable causes, both in Southern California and Canada, and was a regular host of the annual Telemiracle telethon in Saskatchewan for many years in support of the Kinsmen Clubs in that province. His daughter Erin also appeared on several of these telethons, and on one occasion they performed a song together.

== Retirement ==
Perry retired in 1990. In later years he authored two self-awareness books, titled The Sleeper Awakes, A Journey to Self-Awareness (1991) and There's Gotta Be a Pony: Considerations on a Journey of Mastery (2012), and appeared in a few infomercials (mostly produced by his daughter Erin and Pat Finn). In 1991, he made a walk-on appearance on the game show Studs (host Mark DeCarlo was a contestant on $ale of the Century in 1985).

In 1994, Perry hosted a pilot for a lottery game show titled Cash Tornado for Mark Goodson Productions. Taped at CBS Television City's Studio 33 on the same set as The New Price Is Right, the pilot was not tied to a specific lottery but would have featured three different qualifier tickets for any lottery that chose to buy the show. Three players, one representing each game (one of whom was Roger Dobkowitz), played a series of games culminating with the game Avalanche, where the winner could win up to $100,000 on top of what they won earlier. The format did not sell (though it was used as the basis for other lottery game shows, most notably Illinois Instant Riches), but a highlight reel used to pitch the show was later discovered and posted on Wink Martindale's YouTube page as part of the channel's ongoing "Wink's Vault" series on August 1, 2015.

== Personal life ==
Perry met his wife June during his time at Grossingers. She later became a top model with the Eileen Ford agency and later, during their time in Canada, ran her own gallery business as well. She operated her own pottery and gallery, Shambhala Pottery in Bakersville, North Carolina. The couple celebrated their 50th wedding anniversary on June 29, 2009.

=== Death ===
In 2010, Perry was diagnosed with cancer. He died from the disease on November 20, 2015.

Preceded by Peter Jennings	Host of Miss Canada; 1967–1991	Succeeded by Peter Feniak
First	Host of Card Sharks; 1978–1981	Succeeded by Bob Eubanks (daytime)
First	Host of Card Sharks; 1978–1981	Succeeded by Bill Rafferty (nighttime)
