= The Moneymakers =

1960s Canadian game show

The Moneymakers (also known as Bingo at Home) is a late 1960s Canadian game show that was taped in Ottawa, Ontario and hosted by Jim Perry.Its producer was Howard Felsher, who later served in the same capacity on the popular American game show Family Feud.

The game involved five players who would play for the entire week and try to amass the most money, becoming the weekly winner. The object of the game was to fill in the blanks of a bingo-like board using numbers randomly selected from a bingo ball machine. Questions were asked and the correct respondent would place the number on the board. The first player to get four numbers in a row (not including a "free space"), in any direction, won the game.

The winner then played the bonus round in which they answered questions to move a decimal point from right to left and turn the four-digit number they won with into cash. After three correct responses to questions, they could stop with hundreds of dollars (three decimal places), or risk the amount on a fourth question that could win thousands of dollars (four decimal places). If they continued and missed the question, they lost it all.

The show was one of the earliest syndicated series from Canada to also be broadcast in the United States. In the New York City area, it aired on WNEW-TV (now WNYW) in the afternoons.
