= Jim Lange =

American game show host and DJ (1932–2014)

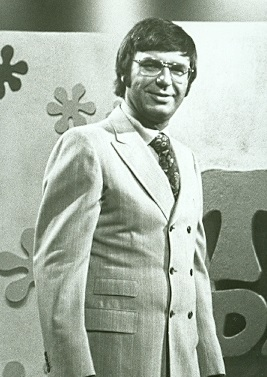
- Lange in 1971 on the set of The Dating Game
- Born: James John Lange; August 15, 1932; Saint Paul, Minnesota, US
- Died: February 25, 2014 (aged 81); Mill Valley, California, US
- Occupation: TV host/Game show host
- Years active: 1965–2005
- Spouse(s): Fay Madigan (1953–1975) Nancy Fleming (m. 1978)
- Children: 3

James John Lange (/læŋ/; August 15, 1932 – February 25, 2014) was an American game show host and disc jockey. He was known to listeners in the San Francisco and Los Angeles radio markets with stints at several stations in both markets, racking up over 45 years on the air. Lange was also known to television viewers as the host of several game shows, including The Dating Game.

== Early career ==
Lange began his radio broadcasting career in the Twin Cities after winning an audition as a teenager, later appearing as kids show host "Captain 11" on WMIN-TV (now KARE). He graduated from Saint Thomas Academy, going on to the University of Minnesota on a scholarship from the Evans Scholars Foundation.

After graduating from the University of Minnesota and serving in the Marines, Lange moved to San Francisco. After making his Bay Area broadcast debut as "The All-Night Mayor" on KGO, he moved to afternoons on KSFO in 1960.

== Game shows ==
Lange's network television career began in San Francisco with The Ford Show in 1962, where he was the announcer for, and sidekick to, host Tennessee Ernie Ford. Three years later he would sign on to host The Dating Game (1965–1980). While still on-air at KSFO, he commuted to Los Angeles to tape the television program.

His other game shows included Oh My Word (1965–1969), $100,000 Name That Tune (1984–1985), The $1,000,000 Chance of a Lifetime, Bowling for Dollars (1976–1977 Los Angeles / Orange County Version), Hollywood Connection, Bullseye (1980–1982) and the ABC version of The New Newlywed Game (February 13–17, 1984), as well as short-lived shows including Spin-Off (1975), Triple Threat (1988–1989) and Give-n-Take (1975).

Lange also appeared as himself on Bewitched, Laverne & Shirley, The Super Mario Bros. Super Show!, Parker Lewis Can't Lose and Moesha. He appeared as a celebrity player on Scrabble during their 1988 "Game Show Host Week", and on Hollywood Squares for their "Game Show Week" in December 2002.

== Later work and death ==
Lange was introduced to Los Angeles local audiences on KMPC in 1970, in order to limit his commute while taping The Dating Game. He returned to Gene Autry/Golden West-owned KSFO by 1971 and remained there until the station was sold in 1983. He then returned to KMPC, where he did mornings and afternoons (at different times) until the end of the decade.

During the 1970s, Lange was a co-host of AM San Francisco on KGO-TV. His co-hosts included Suzanne Somers and former Miss America 1961 Nancy Fleming of Michigan. Lange would later marry Fleming in 1978.

In the early 1990s, Lange returned to full-time radio in the Bay Area. During that period he initially worked afternoons on 610/KFRC. He eventually accepted an offer to broadcast weekday mornings on "Magic 61," by then owned by real estate magnate Peter Bedford (Bedford Broadcasting). Magic 61 was formatted as "American pop standards" (Frank Sinatra, Tony Bennett, Johnny Mathis, Harry Connick Jr., Peggy Lee, Ella Fitzgerald, et al.). After the sale of KFRC AM and FM (99.7) (the new owners decided to simulcast the FM "oldies" format on 610 AM), Jim and the show decamped for a run on KKSJ, San Jose.

In 1997, Lange became morning host of The Lange Gang on KABL in San Francisco. Lange retired in 2005 after KABL went off the air. He also appeared as himself in the critically acclaimed 2002 film Confessions of a Dangerous Mind. In later years, Lange and Fleming lived in Marin County, California.

Lange died of a heart attack at his home in Mill Valley, California on February 25, 2014. He was 81.
