= Jimmy Dale (musician) =

- Born: James Edwin Dale; 23 October 1935; London, England
- Origin: Canada
- Died: 20 May 2017 (aged 81) Naples, Florida, U.S.
- Occupations: Arranger, composer, conductor, organist, pianist
- Instruments: Piano, organ
- Years active: 1950s-1980s

Jimmy Dale (23 October 1935 – 20 May 2017) was a British-born Canadian arranger, composer, conductor, organist, and pianist. He was active as a music director for both Canadian and United States television during the 1970s and 1980s. He has also composed several film and television scores and written a number of TV theme songs and jingles. He has also worked as an arranger and pianist for both performances and recordings with several notable artists.

== Life ==
Born James Edwin Dale in London, Dale immigrated to Canada with his family in 1947 at the age of 11. He attended The Royal Conservatory of Music for two years where he was a pupil of pianist Alma Allen. He also studied music theory and music composition privately in Toronto with Gordon Delamont.

Dale began his career playing in dance bands and pit orchestras in Toronto during the 1950s. In 1957 he joined Peter Appleyard's newly formed jazz ensemble with whom he played and toured for two years. In the early 1960s he began working for the Canadian Broadcasting Corporation as a rehearsal pianist. He eventually was promoted to music director, notably serving in that capacity for the programs À la carte and In Person.

In 1969 Dale relocated to Hollywood where he worked as a music director for both CBS and NBC. Among the shows that he worked in this capacity for were The Smothers Brothers Show (1969, CBS), The Andy Williams Show (1969–1971, NBC), and The Sonny & Cher Comedy Hour (1971–1973, CBS). For the latter show he was nominated for a Creative Arts Emmy Award for "outstanding achievement in the musical direction of a variety, musical or dramatic program" in 1972. He returned to Toronto, commuting to Los Angeles in 1973 to continue his work with CBS. He returned to Hollywood for a short time in 1975 to serve as music director of The Cher Show.

Dale continued to work actively for the CBC in Toronto as a music director during the 1970s and 1980s. He was music director for the television programs Juliette and Friends (1973–5) and The Bob McLean Show (1975–81). He also worked in the same capacity for the CTV Television Network program The Bobby Vinton Show (1976–8), and for two privately syndicated series, Bizarre (1980–86) and Super Dave (beginning in 1987).

From 1974 to 1987 Dale was the pianist for Boss Brass with whom he made several recordings. He also was a regular performer in Toronto nightclubs from the 1960s through the 1980s, notably accompanying such artists as George Coleman, Coleman Hawkins, and Peggy Lee among others. He also performed gigs with his own band, the Jimmy Dale Swingers. In 1968 he released the album Soft and Groovy and also appeared as a pianist on the album Juliette's Christmas World with the Jimmy Dale Swingers. His album Profiles was released in 1980 on the Intercan label. He also worked as a pianist on recordings by Appleyard and Basso.

== Personal life ==
Dale is the father of film producer J. Miles Dale and former professional racing car driver and racing team owner Jeremy Dale.

== Death ==
Dale died on 20 May 2017 in Naples, Florida, at the age was of 81.

== Work as a composer and arranger ==
As a composer, Dale has written several film and television score, including the music for B.S. I Love You, Crunch, The Execution of Raymond Graham, and Breakfast with Les and Bess. He has also written music for the theatre, including writing the orchestrations for the musicals Aimee! and Durante. As an arranger, Dale has put together works for albums by such notable artists as Eugene Amaro, Tommy Ambrose, Denyse Angé, Keath Barrie, Guido Basso, Mary Lou Collins, Cecile Frenette, and Bobby Vinton.

== See also ==
- List of jazz arrangers
