= Dave Devall =

Canadian retired weather reporter

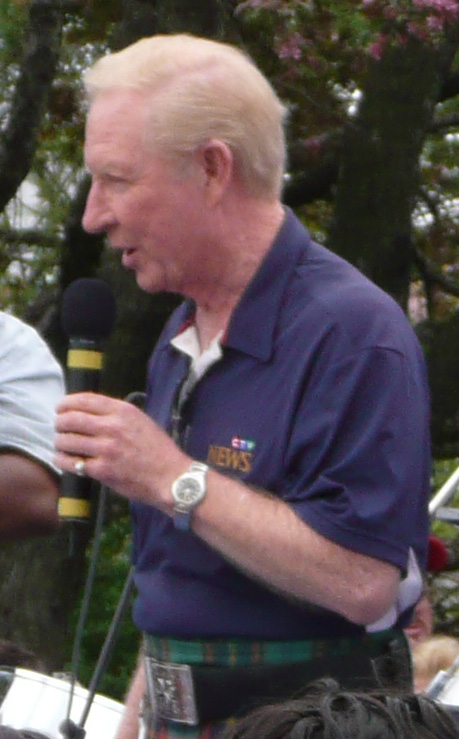
Dave Devall

David Devall (born 1931) is a Canadian retired broadcaster and meteorologist. He served as the chief forecaster at CFTO-TV in Toronto for more than 48 years beginning in 1961, and was recognized as having had the "longest career as a weather forecaster" by Guinness World Records and the World Records Academy upon his retirement on April 3, 2009. Devall was also a recipient of the RTDNA Canada's lifetime achievement award in 2010.

== Early life and career ==
Devall was born, raised, and educated in Toronto (graduate of York Memorial Collegiate in the old City of York).

While studying at Ryerson Institute of Technology's radio and television arts program, he also served in the Royal Canadian Air Force (RCAF) where part of his training centred on meteorology. In 1956, while still a student, he worked at CFPL-TV in London, Ontario; he then moved to Toronto radio station CFRB, where he stayed from 1957 to 1958. After graduating in 1958, he worked at CHEX-TV in Peterborough. When CFTO launched in 1961, Devall auditioned with 2,000 other hopefuls; he was one of six people hired as a broadcaster, and he started at the station on January 7 of the same year.

Devall's voice was heard across Canada as Jim Perry's announcer on many of his game shows, including Definition, Headline Hunters and Eye Bet. As well. he appeared in Ford television commercials on the popular Hockey Night in Canada program. In 1975, Devall was offered a hosting position with ABC's Good Morning America; he turned down the offer and remained with CFTO-TV. While at the station, he also served as a continuity announcer, voicing promos, bumpers, program intros and outros, station IDs and the nightly sign-off sequence.

Despite various new weathercasters joining the station, Devall remained the chief weather presenter at CFTO until his retirement, and also appeared daily on co-owned CTV Newsnet to present the national weather forecast. His funny antics have made him popular with Toronto viewers. During his early years at the station, he presented the weather forecast from behind a clear acrylic glass weather map, which necessitated writing backwards with a grease pencil. After electronically generated weather maps were introduced, he continued the tradition with a single daily weather word.

Devall was made an honorary colonel of the Canadian Forces Squadron 436 at CFB Trenton in February 2007.

== Retirement ==
Devall retired on April 3, 2009. Two days earlier, it had been announced that Devall had set the newly created Guinness World Record for the "longest career as a weather forecaster" at 48 years, 2 months, and 27 days. That record was surpassed by fellow Canadian broadcast weather forecaster Peter Coade in 2013.

As part of his send-off, CFTO and the City of Toronto announced that the roadway leading to CTV's Toronto studios, Channel Nine Court, had been temporarily renamed "Dave Devall Way" in his honour.

Following retirement, Devall has made appearances in television commercials for local businesses, including an area Toyota dealership in 2010 and Loblaws in 2011. In July 2012, Devall appeared in a string of commercials for Shoppers Drug Mart.

He was also one of several retired longtime CFTO employees (including the more recent departures of Tom Gibney (2007) and Jim Junkin (2010)) who returned for a retrospective on the station's fiftieth anniversary on December 31, 2010. He appeared briefly at the end of longtime CTV anchor Christine Bentley's final broadcast on September 14, 2012.

One of Devall's major appearances after retiring was as the master of ceremonies for the 2013 Portraits of Honour Juno Beach Dinner Gala, in Cambridge, Ontario. In 2020, Devall was interviewed about his work on Definition for the GameTV documentary series The Search for Canada's Game Shows.
