= Satellite Program Network =

American television network from 1979 to 1989

- Original logo as Satellite Program Network

- Logo for network as Tempo Television designed by Landor (1986–1989)
- Type: Television network
- Country: United States
- Broadcast area: United States; Puerto Rico

Programming
- Language: English
- Picture format: SDTV 4:3

Ownership
- Owner: Southern Satellite Systems (1979–1985); Satellite Syndicated Systems (1985–1986); Tempo Enterprises (1986–1988); NBC (1988–1989)
- Parent: Satellite Syndicated Systems (1979–1985)
- Sister channels: Tempol International (SPN International) (1986–1989)

History
- Launched: July 30, 1979
- Founder: Ed Taylor
- Closed: April 1, 1989
- Replaced by: CNBC
- Former names: Satellite Program Network (SPN) (1979–1986); Tempo Television (1986–1989)

Satellite Program Network (SPN) was a satellite and cable television network that broadcast in the United States from 1979 to 1989. Following a name change to Tempo Television in 1986, it was bought by NBC and relaunched as CNBC in 1989.

== History ==
=== Early years ===
SPN was created by Ed Taylor, an associate of Ted Turner and the head of the Southern Satellite Systems company. The network, which began on July 30, 1979, was the second-oldest cable-only network.

Among the programs broadcast on SPN were Video Concert Hall, an early music video show (before the launch of MTV); News from Home, a program for Canadians in the US, hosted by early CNN news anchor Don Miller; The Shopping Game, a Nicholson-Muir game show produced in Nashville and hosted by Art James; The Susan Noon Show, featuring celebrity interviews; Nutrition Dialogue, hosted by Dr. Betty Kamen; Sewing with Nancy; The Paul Ryan Show, another celebrity interview program with the actor/interviewer of the same name; and Moscow Meridian, a current-affairs program produced by Soviet authorities and hosted by Vladimir Posner. Reruns of old situation comedies and movies, mostly from low-budget studios, rounded out the schedule.

In 1984, the National Collegiate Athletic Association (NCAA) paid SPN to broadcast some college football games of the Division I-AA playoffs, including that season's championship game, following a Supreme Court ruling (NCAA v. Board of Regents of the University of Oklahoma) that halted the NCAA's practice of negotiating television contracts for its members.

In 1985, SPN was acquired by Satellite Syndicated Systems.

=== Later years ===
On March 8, 1986, Satellite Syndicated Systems changed its name to Tempo Enterprises, and SPN and SPN International were changed to Tempo Television and Tempol International, respectively. Tempo Television was a 24-hour national cable network serving all contiguous states, Alaska, Hawaii and Puerto Rico.

Using a counter-programming philosophy, Tempo Television fulfilled viewer needs by dividing its program schedule into various dayparts including international programming, finance, sports, leisure and classic films. Market studies clearly indicated that this unique programming approach attracted and retained upscale audiences who were looking for entertainment that was informative and substantially different from the standard options.

A Canadian regulatory description of the channel in 1988 said that Tempo's "schedule consists of outdoors, travel, general information and entertainment programming and classic feature films that are in the public domain." In May 1988, by which time Tempo had 12 million subscribers, the channel was purchased by NBC, mainly for its existing carriage and not its programming. It was relaunched on April 17, 1989, in a new guise as the business news channel CNBC.
