= Satellite Syndicated Systems =

American telecommunications company

Satellite Syndicated Systems, Inc. (SSS) was a company founded in 1978 as a division of Southern Satellite Systems, Inc., dedicated to the exploration and development of new satellite communication opportunities, especially for the then-new industry of satellite television distribution.

Southern Satellite Systems was founded in 1976 in Tulsa, Oklahoma, and was formed for the sole purpose of distributing WTCG (later WTBS), an Atlanta UHF television station (Turner Broadcasting) nationwide via satellite.

In 1978, Satellite Syndicated Systems, Inc. was founded, and established as the parent to Southern. Southern Satellite Systems remained intact under the TEMPO Enterprises umbrella (SSS would change their name to TEMPO Enterprises in the early 1980s) as a separate wholly owned subsidiary and distributed the "Superstation WTBS" signal to cable TV systems all across the country.

TEMPO Enterprises served as the parent and holding company to several subsidiaries, including TEMPO Television, TEMPO International, TEMPO Productions, TEMPO Cable, TEMPO Sound, TEMPO Data and TEMPO Travel. TEMPO Enterprises (under its former name Satellite Syndicated Systems, Inc.) entered the arena of publicly traded companies in August 1983. The company was part of the NASDAQ National Market System under the stock symbol TMPO.

Satellite Syndicated Systems, its subsidiaries, and divisions were sold to cable television company Tele-Communications, Inc. (TCI) in 1989, which were either absorbed by TCI or re-sold to other communication companies. Satellite Program Network, a satellite and cable TV network founded in 1979 and acquired by Tempo in 1985 and renamed TEMPO Television, was shut down in 1989 by Tempo, with its former satellite channel space leased to NBC in 1989 to make way for their CNBC channel.
