= E. Roger Muir =

American television producer (1918–2008)

- Born: Ernest Roger Muir; December 16, 1918; Alberta, Canada
- Died: October 23, 2008 (aged 89); Wolfeboro, New Hampshire, U.S.
- Occupation: Television producer
- Known for: Creator and Executive Producer (EP) of TV series, Howdy Doody
- Spouse: ?
- Children: 1 son

Ernest Roger Muir (December 16, 1918 – October 23, 2008) was a Canadian-born American television producer who created several television programs and game shows. He was the creator and executive producer of children's program Howdy Doody, which ran from 1947 until 1960.

== Early life and studies ==
Muir was born in Alberta, Canada, on December 16, 1918, and moved to Minneapolis as a child. He graduated from the University of Minnesota, where he studied photography. He served in the United States Army during World War II, assigned to a film production unit.

== Career ==
He was hired by NBC after the war, based on the recommendation of a fellow soldier who had worked for the network before the war.

At NBC, he produced or directed shows including Who Said That?, in which journalists and celebrities competed to identify the source of quotations in the news. Other programs included The NBC Opera; The Wide, Wide World; and Your Hit Parade.

Muir produced The Howdy Doody Show, during its run on NBC from 1947 to 1960.

In 1948, Muir conceived of a promotion in which Howdy Doody would run for President of the boys and girls in the November election, running on a campaign platform advocating two Christmases and one school day a year, more pictures in history books and free lollipops, among other pledges. In response, the show received thousands of requests for Howdy Doody campaign buttons. The show was canceled in 1960, with Muir observing where advertisers preferred to spend their money to reach adults rather than children, as adults could offer a more immediate return on their advertising spending. NBC chose Shari Lewis to fill the slot on the schedule.

In 1961, Muir joined with Bobby Nicholson to form a production company, Nicholson-Muir Productions, under which joint banner they created and/or produced a number of game shows including The Newlywed Game (which was produced by Chuck Barris); Pay Cards! (and its revival, Super Pay Cards!); Matches 'n Mates; Spin-Off; and The Shopping Game. Muir also co-produced The New Howdy Doody Show with Nicholson. The show ran in syndication in 1976 and 1977. The duo also created Canada's longest-running game show, Definition, which ran from 1974 to 1989.

== Death ==
Muir died at age 89 due to a stroke on October 23, 2008 (less than two months short of his 90th birthday), near his home in Wolfeboro, New Hampshire. He was survived by his wife, son, five grandchildren, and one great-grandchild.
