= WHFV (Fredericksburg, Virginia) =

Television station in Fredericksburg, Virginia (1973–1975)

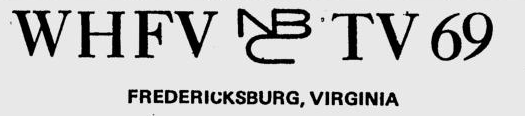
- Fredericksburg, Virginia; United States
- Channels: Analog: 69 (UHF)

Programming
- Affiliations: NBC

Ownership
- Owner: Television Fredericksburg, Inc.

History
- Founded: November 1972
- First air date: October 8, 1973
- Last air date: May 29, 1975
- Call sign meaning: "Historic Fredericksburg, Virginia"

Technical information
- ERP: 220.3 kW
- HAAT: 165 m (540 ft)

WHFV (channel 69) was a television station in Fredericksburg, Virginia, United States, affiliated with NBC and owned by Television Fredericksburg, Inc. The station signed on in 1973, found itself heavily in debt and losing money, and was forced to go dark in 1975.

== History ==
=== Sign-on ===
Television Fredericksburg, Inc. was granted a construction permit for station WHFV on channel 69 in November 1972.

After construction delays, WHFV obtained an affiliation with NBC on May 3, and signed on in the evening of October 8, 1973. Local radio man Keith Angstadt, formerly a reporter with WFLS (1350 AM, now WNTX, and 93.3 FM, WFLS-FM) was the first general manager. WHFV transmitted from a studio and tower on Hudgins Road roughly three miles southwest of downtown Fredericksburg with an effective radiated power of 220.3 kW. (Note: Long after the building and land were sold, businesses in the area still have mailing addresses on TV Drive.)

Although Fredericksburg was, then as now, part of the Washington, D.C., television market, it was a separate radio market. The ownership group believed the city was large enough for a locally focused TV station. However, the fact remained that WHFV was trying to compete in a very saturated regional television landscape. First, WHFV not only had to compete with WRC-TV in Washington, but WWBT in Richmond was also available over the air in most of WHFV's coverage area (Fredericksburg is roughly halfway between Richmond and Washington). Second, any reasonably popular syndicated programming was likely to be already picked up by Washington or Richmond stations—especially as Washington had two independent stations, WTTG and WDCA—leaving WHFV to either duplicate the shows or pick up weaker ones. Third, all other network affiliates in the area were on VHF, with only educational and independent stations occupying UHF channels. Although it had been eight years since the Federal Communications Commission (FCC) had mandated all-channel tuning, many viewers still did not have a proper antenna for tuning to UHF stations. Many of those who did were not used to tuning to such a high channel number. With this in mind, WHFV ran newspaper advertisements explaining how to tune a UHF channel.

Issues for WHFV began almost immediately, as it signed on before the local cable franchise received FCC permission to carry it, causing interested viewers to flood the company with complaints.

The station carried on for more than a year as a typical small-market network affiliate, carrying NBC programming, two newscasts a day, a typical slate of syndicated sitcom and drama reruns, and a few local productions. Advertising support was initially weak in the small coverage area, and financial losses started mounting. As early as April and May 1974, the station began advertising in The Free Lance-Star that stock in Television Fredericksburg, Inc. was available to local residents. One of two non-news productions, the daily Children's World, was canceled and replaced by the then-relatively unknown The Phil Donahue Show at the end of the 1973–74 season. The station's financial losses accelerated during the summer.

=== Financial trouble and sign-off ===
By the fall, WHFV was in dire straits. As of Labor Day 1974, it became little more than a pass-through for NBC, as nearly all syndicated programs besides news and Donahue were removed from the schedule. The station filled out its schedule during non-network hours with a daily 4:30 p.m. movie, an unusually timed 7 p.m. local newscast, and one low-rent syndicated show in the 7:30 p.m. slot. Realizing the station was on the brink, Television Fredericksburg began advertising nationally for a buyer and had to resort to short-term loans to continue operations. However, there was nowhere near enough money coming in to service the debt, and the station fell into default. The Free-Lance Star reported that the station had been sued for more than $1 million owed to five local banks, two equipment lessors, and the IRS, in addition to reporting operating losses of $207,000 year-to-date in October 1974. One potential sale to Fairfax County businessman Charles Henry Smith, Jr. fell through in September. Smith expressed his opinion that the operation could turn a profit in several years, and its fatal mistake was going on the air without accounting for this. Television Fredericksburg was severely undercapitalized, and clearly did not have enough cash on hand to survive even a year of losses.

Events came to a head on December 16, 1974, as station employees conducted a walkout after going a month without pay. General manager Angstadt locked himself in the building, canceled the newscasts for the day, and performed all other operations solo. The employees returned to work the next day, contingent on being paid December 24, which was itself contingent on an "imminent" sale.

The sale was announced on December 26, pending FCC approval. The buyer was Texas religious broadcaster Release the World for Christ, Inc., who did not own any stations—although owner Chris Panos hosted a syndicated talk show, The Chris Panos Show, on the few stations of Pat Robertson's fledgling Christian Broadcasting Network. Panos pledged to retain the NBC affiliation and keep as much secular programming as possible.

Still, six full-time staff members left, including Angstadt, leaving station engineer Ray McInturff to pull double duty as manager. In an attempt to relieve its financial situation, WHFV rented half of its building out and crammed operations into the remaining space. The station's financial trouble brought the attention of the State Corporation Commission, who in March found grounds to block the sale. Television Fredericksburg had been granted an exception from stock-registration requirements under Virginia law, which the state argued should be removed if a controlling stake was to be sold to an out-of-state interest. Television Fredericksburg successfully defended its actions in an April 2 hearing and the sale was allowed to proceed.

In an abrupt reversal, on May 28, 1975, WHFV suddenly notified the FCC that it was out of money and would go off the air the next day. The station, having waited as long as it could for FCC approval of the sale, blamed inaction on Release the World's part. The FCC agreed, stating that Release the World had been notified that it failed to submit complete financial information in its application to transfer control. The FCC placed the application on hold and did not take any action while it awaited completed information. (Potential transferees must prove they have enough cash on hand to acquire the station and run it for one year.) The FCC set an original deadline of May 22 to complete the application, after which it would close and eventually be dismissed. Release the World negotiated an extension to May 29.

The Free Lance-Star quoted both an anonymous station employee and McInturff as suspecting that the delay showed that Release the World was attempting to back out of the deal. For their part, Release the World said it had sent the information to its lawyer in Washington in time to have the application completed on May 29, but also stated the group would "change [their] thinking" on the purchase if the station were to go dark and lay off its staff. Despite this statement, Release the World's lawyer said he never received the information; the application was not completed in time, and the FCC formally dismissed it in July.

WHFV signed off for what would be the final time on May 29, 1975, at exactly 4:57:45 p.m.; the final NBC program aired on the station was the soap opera Somerset, at 4 p.m. The station was so far in debt that it was of no concern that there was no money to pay UPI for the wire service—the staff could not even afford more paper for the teleprinter in the first place.

=== Post-sign off ===
When exactly the WHFV license was finally canceled is unclear. McInturff indicated that even though he was taking the station dark, he intended to renew the station's license in October 1975 to keep a potential buyer from having to expend the time and money to re-establish it. In July 1975, Television Fredericksburg's lawyer said the company would soon "cease to exist" as a result of its debts. The channel 69 transmitter was sold in 1976 and moved to Allentown, Pennsylvania, to sign on WFMZ-TV.

WHFV's former tower is still standing and visible from U.S. Route 1. It was returned to documented broadcasting use in 2000 when FM translator W218CV (91.5 FM) moved to the site. Subsequently, translators W231BJ (94.1 FM) and W292EF (106.3 FM) and full-powered station WGRQ (95.9 FM) also relocated their facilities to the tower between 2007 and 2013.

WHFV was listed as an active call sign when Broadcasting compiled a list of currently-licensed UHF stations in February 1979, as well as in the call sign list but not the directory of the 1979 Television Factbook. Both imply that the license was still active, even if the station was not broadcasting. At the time, a television license had a maximum term of five years; the license definitely expired by October 1980. In 1986, Rappahannock Television Broadcasting, Inc. received a construction permit to build station WRBV at the former WHFV transmitter site. The permit expired in March 1988 without being built amid accusations of fraud among the partners.

Although Fredericksburg grew into a full-fledged radio market of its own, only one further attempt has been made to start a locally-focused television station. Central Virginia Public Access Television, which took the form of a public-access cable channel rather than a broadcast station, launched in 2013 and ceased operations in 2020.

Keith Angstadt moved to Mutual Radio. Steve Handelsman, later a longtime political reporter with NBC News, worked as a reporter at WHFV before moving on to WLWT in Cincinnati as WHFV shut down.

== Programming and coverage ==
WHFV was on the air from 7 a.m. until the end of network programming, signing on for Today and on most days signing off at 2 a.m., after The Tomorrow Show, or 2:30 a.m. after The Midnight Special on early Saturdays. Initial programming outside of NBC and local news for the 1973–74 season were reruns of older sitcoms and dramas (I Love Lucy, The Andy Griffith Show, Gomer Pyle, U.S.M.C., Have Gun Will Travel, The Danny Thomas Show), movies on the weekends, and church services and other religious programming on Sunday mornings. The station had two other local productions: a public affairs program titled Close-Up, which aired Sunday evenings at 10:30 p.m., and the daily Children's World at 9 a.m. Local newscasts aired on the weekdays during Today station breaks (7:25 and 8:25 a.m.), and every day at 6 and 11 p.m.

For the 1974–75 season, the non-network schedule was gutted to cut costs. Programming included reruns of the 1950s-era Hank Thompson Show, Jim Ed Brown's The Country Place and a syndicated version of The Jimmy Dean Show, all in the 7:30 p.m. slot. After Release the World entered into an agreement to buy the station, The Chris Panos Show was added to this rotation. The remaining time after NBC went off the air at 4:30 p.m. and before the NBC Nightly News at 6:30 p.m. was filled by a daily movie, with the local evening newscast moving to 7 p.m. Close-Up was kept, while Children's World was replaced by The Phil Donahue Show.

The station claimed grade B coverage in a 35-mile (56 km) radius: north to Centreville, west to Orange, south to Ashland and east into rural St. Mary's County, Maryland. It also gained carriage on the few cable systems within its coverage area: Fredericksburg, Orange, Culpeper, Dale City, Woodbridge, and La Plata, Maryland. At least in Fredericksburg proper, the cable system carried all three NBC outlets but substituted WHFV during network programming.
