= The Money Maze =

American television series

- Created by: Don Lipp; Ron Greenberg
- Directed by: Arthur Forrest
- Presented by: Nick Clooney
- Narrated by: Alan Kalter
- Composer: David Sheniak for Score Productions, Inc.
- Country of origin: United States
- No. of episodes: 135

Production
- Producer: Don Segall
- Running time: 25 minutes
- Production company: Daphne-Don Lipp Productions

Original release
- Network: ABC
- Release: December 23, 1974 – June 27, 1975

The Money Maze is an American television game show seen on ABC from December 23, 1974, to June 27, 1975. The show was hosted by Nick Clooney and was announced by Alan Kalter. It was produced by Daphne-Don Lipp Productions, of which Dick Cavett was a principal.

The object of the game was to negotiate a large maze built on the studio floor that housed several towers. A contestant would direct their spouse from a perch above the maze; the spouse would need to find their way to a specified tower inside the maze and press a button there in order to win prizes.

Clooney hosted Money Maze concurrently with his local daily talk show, The Nick Clooney Show, on then-ABC affiliate WKRC-TV in Cincinnati (now a CBS station). In fact, WKRC scheduled Money Maze on a delay at 10:30 a.m., immediately before Nick Clooney at 11:00, to provide a 90-minute block for the popular local personality.

== Gameplay ==
Two married couples played against each other for the right to enter the maze. Three regular rounds were played. Each round had a particular topic, with eight related clues. Two clues would be shown on a screen; one couple would select a clue for the other to attempt to answer. A correct answer scored a point, and that couple would then select from two clues (a new clue plus the unused one from the last pair) for the opposing couple. An incorrect answer gave the opponents a chance to answer instead. If they did so correctly, they won the round and had a chance to answer as many of the remaining clues as possible; otherwise, play would continue in the round. If the two couples each answered four clues in the round, a tiebreaker would be played where two additional clues were shown. The first couple to activate a buzzer would select a clue to answer for one point, then try to answer the other for two points. If they were wrong on either, the other couple got a free attempt.

The winning couple in each round would then send one member into the maze, with the other directing from above. The "runner" would have 15 seconds to find a phone-booth-size "tower" with push-buttons on each side. Pressing the lit button before time expired won the prize and three points. Later in the show's run, couples were given the option of trying to also reach a second "money tower" within a total of 25 seconds for a $500 bonus and three additional points; if they accepted the risk but failed to reach both towers, the prize and the cash bonus were both lost.

=== Catch-Up Round ===
Clues proceeded as in earlier rounds, except that the couple trailing in score at that point of the game would do all the answering and the leading team would select the clues. The first clue was worth one point, the second worth two, and so on. If the trailing couple incorrectly answered at any time before their score surpassed their opponents, the round was over and the other couple won outright. If the trailing couple tied or passed the leading couple's score, the leading couple, now trailing, received only one chance for a final clue that would win the game.

The winner at the end of this round would play "The $10,000 Dash," a final maze run for a prize of up to $10,000. Both couples kept their money and prizes. If both couples were tied going into the Catch-Up Round, they each ran the maze for $10,000.

=== The $10,000 Dash ===
In the final run, five of the towers (out of eight available) would be lit. Four of them would have zeroes on top, and the fifth would have a "1" lit. The runner had 60 seconds to activate the "1" and hit the button at the maze exit to win anything at all. To win the $10,000, the runner had to activate the push-buttons on the five lit towers, reach the exit, and push its button, referred to as "The Birthday Cake" by host Clooney, within 60 seconds. The couple won $1 for reaching the "1," and the winnings were multiplied by 10 for each zero reached. However, if the runner activated only zeroes or did not hit the exit button before time ran out, the couple won nothing. The buttons could be hit in any order, but only one button on each tower was active.

Champions were retired upon winning the $10,000 Dash or after appearing for three days.

== Broadcast history ==
ABC broadcast The Money Maze at 4:00 p.m. Eastern (3:00 Central), opposite Tattletales on CBS and Somerset on NBC; designed to replace The Newlywed Game as part of a scheduling shuffle with The $10,000 Pyramid, and as part of Michael Brockman's push for younger talent, Money Maze did not perform well against either series in the ratings, and host Clooney claimed in a 1998 Cincinnati Post column that fewer than half of ABC's affiliates carried the show.

However, this was not the only reason the show faltered.

=== Set ===
The large maze, estimated by some sources at 50 × 100 feet, had the audience sitting in bleachers above and around three sides of the maze, with the stage facing the remaining side. It is also widely believed to have been the main factor in the show's undoing.

The set was so large and complex that it took nearly an entire day to set up the maze and another to break it down, tying up the studio for an extra two days for each five-show, one-day taping session. According to Mark Evanier, producer Don Segall described Money Maze as "the first game show where the stage crew took home more money than the contestants"; the rental fees for taping at a large studio for several days, plus overtime pay for setting up, striking, and storing the set, quickly eclipsed the show's prize budget.

=== Cancellation ===
ABC may have viewed the large expenses as a headache, even as Tattletales was pushed to 11:00 am on June 16 in favor of Musical Chairs. While Money Maze was scheduled to end on July 4, the network discontinued the show before the final week was taped. The last aired week (June 30 – July 4) consisted of repeats from the later format (with the $500 bonus tower), all containing $10,000 wins, with the Friday repeat being the last first-run show from the previous Friday. A new version of the 1960s game You Don't Say! replaced The Money Maze the next week.

=== Planned revival ===
In 2009, producer Ron Greenberg worked with Don Lipp and Phil Gurin on a new pilot for a revival on French TV network TF1. It is uncertain what has come of these plans.

== Episode status ==
The pilot (titled The Moneymaze) and at least one episode from the series exist in ABC's archive. As with most other daytime game shows on the networks other than CBS from that era, the tapes were erased after broadcast for reuse due to their great expense at the time.

A brief clip from an episode aired in 2004 when Chuck Barris and George Clooney (Nick Clooney's son) were promoting Confessions of a Dangerous Mind. Another 1975 episode, recorded on an early home VCR by artist Andy Warhol, is held at the Paley Center for Media.
