= Eye Bet =

Canadian television game show

Eye Bet is a Canadian television game show hosted by Jim Perry, which aired on CTV from 1972 to 1974. Perry's announcer, as with most Jim Perry game shows in Canada, was CFTO-TV weatherman Dave Devall. The object of Eye Bet was for contestants to view old Hollywood movie clips, then answer questions about each clip, testing their skills of observation.

This game show is similar to that of an ABC game show, The Reel Game, hosted and produced by Jack Barry which was a weekly nighttime series that lasted for a little more than three months.

The series was cancelled by CTV in 1974.

According to TV North, a book about the history of Canadian television by Peter Kenter, production of Eye Bet was cancelled when the costs of licensing the movie clips became prohibitive.
