= Musical Chairs (1975 game show) =

- Title card for the 1975 Musical Chairs.
- Created by: Don Kirshner; Jerry Schnur
- Presented by: Adam Wade
- Announcer: Pat Hernon
- Music by: Derek Smith (music director)
- Country of origin: United States
- No. of episodes: 99

Production
- Running time: 30 minutes
- Production company: Jerome Schnur/Don Kirshner Productions

Original release
- Network: CBS
- Release: June 16 – October 31, 1975

Musical Chairs is an American game show that aired from June 16 to October 31, 1975, on CBS. Adam Wade hosted, making him the first African-American game show host. The game show was recorded at the Ed Sullivan Theater (CBS Studio 50) in New York City and sportscaster Pat Hernon was the announcer. The show was created by Don Kirshner and Jerry Schnur

Musical Chairs aired at 4:00 PM Eastern Time (3:00 PM Central Time), replacing Tattletales, which had moved to the morning, against NBC's Somerset and ABC's The Money Maze (and later You Don't Say!); it was not successful in the ratings against that competition. Give-n-Take replaced Chairs the following Monday for 4 weeks before Tattletales moved back to 4:00 PM.

Usually appearing on each episode were guest singers and musical groups, among them The Tokens, The Spinners, Larry Kert, Margaret Whiting, Sharon Vaughn, The New Christy Minstrels and Sister Sledge as well as up and coming singers and stars such as Alaina Reed, Kelly Garrett, Marilyn Sokol, Jane Olivor, DeeDee Warwick and Irene Cara,

== Gameplay ==
Four contestants competed, one usually a champion. Three rounds and nine songs were played. A singer (host Wade and/or one of the guest performers) would begin to sing a song, but stop at a certain point. The singer then sang three different lyrics for the next line of the song, only one of which was correct, which were all displayed on back-lit panels. One panel occasionally contained humorous or absurd lyrics. The incorrect lyrics were written by songwriters/lyricists who were on the show's staff. Songwriter Bruce Sussman was the show's chief writer for its entire run. On occasion, the performers would sing an entire verse and/or chorus and Wade would simply ask a question related to the song, with three possible answers. The players then picked which of the three options he or she thought was correct by pressing a button on their console. The order in which they buzzed in was displayed on their podiums.

For the first question in each round, the first three players to lock in the correct answer won the money for that question. On the second question, only the first two correct answers won the money, and for the third question, only the first correct answer won the money. The questions were worth $50 for the first round, $75 for the second round, and $100 for the third round. However, after each question in the third round, the player with the least money was eliminated from the game, although they did get to keep any winnings up to that point. In addition, the rules stipulated that only one player could be eliminated per song. If there was a tie for last place after the first or second song, another song was played at the same level. If it broke the tie, the now last place was eliminated. If not, or the results caused another tie, another song was played in the same manner until the tie was broken. Although, on at least one occasion, Adam just asked the players locked in the tie a multiple choice jump in question. The first of them to buzz in with the right answer stayed with no additional money added to his or her score. The other was player was eliminated as described above. The third song was played differently. To become champion, the player not only had to be first with the right answer, but also have the higher score. If the leader buzzed in first, and got the song right, the game was over and they were the champion. If not, or the trailer managed to buzz in first, and get the song right but the $100 earned was not enough to take the lead and win, another song was played, and so on as above, until they either took the lead and won, or the leader beat them to the buzzer, got the song right and won that way.

=== Changes ===
Starting October 7, the first song in each round paid $50 each to the first three players to lock in with the right answer. The second song paid $75 to the first three players to be correct, and the last song paid $100 to the first three players with the correct song line. The player with the lowest score after each round would be eliminated from further play, but kept all winnings up to that point. In the second round, the first two players to lock in the correct answer won money. Ties for last place in the first two rounds were broken as above. The third round was played differently than the previous two. Once again, three songs were played with the money paying off to the first player to lock in the correct answer. If the leader rang in first and answered correctly on the third question, the game ended and he/she became the day's champion. If not, another song was played for $100. The game would then continue in this manner until the leader answered one more question or the opponent answered enough questions to overtake the leader. As before, the player with the most money after the final round won the game.

=== Bonus round ===
Originally, the contestant chose one of three categories. One of the singers then sang a line from a song, and the contestant had to come up with the next line (similar to the main game). The contestant could pass on a song they couldn't guess, and come back to it if time allowed. Each correct answer won the contestant $50. Getting 10 correct in 60 seconds won the contestant $1,000.

After two weeks, the bonus round was dropped and the winning contestant simply had his/her main game total doubled.

Beginning August 26, a new bonus round was introduced. As before, the contestant chose one of three categories, then heard the melody of a song. The lyrics were then shown split into ten lines, albeit scrambled and had to be put in the proper order. Each time a line was correctly placed, the contestant won $100. Getting all 10 in the proper places within 30 seconds won the contestant $2,000.

Episodes occasionally straddled and continued the next day.

== Episode status ==
For many years, the status of the episodes of Musical Chairs was unknown. One episode from September 11, 1975 with musical guests Irene Cara, soap star Mary Stuart, and the Spinners had been circulating among collectors from as far back as 1997. Two more episodes were uploaded to YouTube by a former contestant in 2017 featuring her appearances during the series' final week in October 1975.

It had been presumed that the other shows fell victim to wiping, although CBS had all but abandoned that practice by 1972. However, beginning in October 2025, many of the remaining episodes began appearing on a YouTube channel dedicated to the series.
