= The Newlywed Game =

American television game show

- Also known as: The New Newlywed Game (1985–1988); The Newlywed Game Starring Paul Rodriguez (1988–1989)
- Genre: Dating game show
- Created by: Robert "Nick" Nicholson; E. Roger Muir
- Directed by: Bill Carruthers (1966–1974); John Dorsey (aka "The Fox"; 1966–1974, 1977–1980, 1985–1988); Jeff Goldstein (1988–1989); Paul Casey (1996–1999); Rob Fiedler (1997–1998); Alan Carter (2009–2010); Rob George (2010); Bob Levy (2010–2013)
- Presented by: Bob Eubanks; Paul Rodriguez; Gary Kroeger; Carnie Wilson; Sherri Shepherd
- Announcer: Scott Beach; Johnny Jacobs; Tony McClay; Bob Hilton; Charlie O'Donnell; Ellen K; John Cramer; Brad Aldous; Randy West
- Theme music composer: Chuck Barris (1966–1974, 1977–1980, 1985–1988, 1997–1999)
- Composers: Lynn Barris (music coordinator 1966–1974); Frank Jaffe (music coordinator, 1966–1974); Lee Ringuette (music coordinator, 1977–1980, 1984–1988); Milton DeLugg (music director, 1984–1988); Jim Latham (1996–1997); Steve Kaplan (1997–1998); Barry Coffing (1998–1999); John Blaylock (1998–1999); Lewis Flinn (2009–2013)
- Country of origin: United States
- Original language: English

Production
- Executive producers: Chuck Barris (1966–1974, 1977–1980, 1985–1987); Jeff Wald (1987–1989); Michael Canter (1996–1997); Stephen Brown (1997–1999); Michael Davies (2009–2013); Jennifer Kelly (2009); Vincent Rubino (2010)
- Producers: Bill Carruthers (1966–1974); Walt Case (1966–1974, 1984–1988); David M.Greenfield (1977–1980); Scott Sternberg (1988–1989); Bruce Starin (1988–1989); Jennifer Simons (2009–2013)
- Running time: approx. 22–26 minutes
- Production companies: Barris Industries (1966–1974, 1977–1980, 1984–1989); Columbia TriStar Television (1996–1999); Embassy Row (2009–2013); GSN (2009–2013); Sony Pictures Television (2009–2013)

Original release
- Network: ABC Daytime
- Release: July 11, 1966 – December 20, 1974
- Network: ABC Primetime
- Release: January 7, 1967 – August 30, 1971
- Network: Syndication
- Release: September 12, 1977 – May 23, 1980
- Network: ABC
- Release: February 13 – February 17, 1984
- Network: Syndication
- Release: September 16, 1985 – May 26, 1989
- Release: September 16, 1996 – May 28, 1999
- Network: GSN
- Release: April 6, 2009 – February 14, 2013

The Newlywed Game is an American television game show. Newly married couples compete against each other in a series of revealing question rounds to determine how well the spouses know or do not know each other. The program, originally created by Robert "Nick" Nicholson and E. Roger Muir (credited on-screen as Roger E. Muir) and produced by Chuck Barris, has appeared in many different versions since its 1966 debut. The show became famous for some of the arguments that couples had over incorrect answers in the form of mistaken predictions, and it even led to some divorces.

Many of The Newlywed Game's questions dealt with "making whoopee", the euphemism that producers used for sexual intercourse to circumvent network censorship. However, it became such a catchphrase of the show that its original host, Bob Eubanks, continued to use the phrase throughout the show's many runs, even in the 1980s and 1990s episodes and beyond, when he could easily have said "make love" or "have sex" during these periods without censorship.

In 2013, TV Guide ranked it No. 10 in its list of the 60 greatest game shows ever.

== Broadcast history ==
The Newlywed Game debuted on the ABC television network on July 11, 1966, scheduled at 2 p.m. (1 p.m. Central), replacing the anthology series/soap opera Confidential for Women. On the day it debuted, CBS preempted its popular Password to cover a news conference held by then-Defense Secretary Robert McNamara, which was delayed a half-hour, with the network "vamping" until he spoke. ABC opted to wait until just as the press conference began, and as a result The Newlywed Game was able to get a slight head start in the head-to-head ratings battle with the long-running Password. Over the next few months, more viewers were tuning into The Newlywed Game and the NBC soap Days of Our Lives, and thus, it became a hit, while Password's ratings began to fall and eventually led to the series' cancellation fourteen months later and its replacement with soap opera Love Is a Many Splendored Thing.

By the early 1970s however, Days of Our Lives was winning the timeslot regularly (though not always) over The Newlywed Game and CBS' Guiding Light (who took over Love Is a Many Splendored Thing's timeslot in September 1972). Eventually, ABC determined that The Newlywed Game had run its course on daytime, and on December 20, 1974, the show concluded its initial run after nearly eight and a half years on the network. It was the longest-running game show in ABC daytime history until 1985, when Family Feud surpassed it, having run nine years at the time of its cancellation that year. The Money Maze, a game hosted by Nick Clooney, father of George Clooney, replaced it on the ABC schedule, but lasted only six months, and the old 2:00pm slot was taken over by The $10,000 Pyramid as part of Michael Brockman's plan to push into younger viewers.

A syndicated version of the show began airing in 1977, with the same rules and set as the ABC original, albeit with more double entendres than the original. Mostly successful, it nonetheless was canceled in 1980, not directly because of the show itself. In fall 1979, creator Chuck Barris had debuted something of a spin-off show, 3's a Crowd, in which a man, his wife and his secretary would compete. The controversy, driven by the implications of adultery that came with such a concept, ended 3's a Crowd before the season was out. The fallout extended to The Newlywed Game as well. Two major sponsors, Ford and Procter & Gamble, cut ties with the show. It was also nearly evicted from the studios of KTLA in Los Angeles, its longtime production base, after owner Gene Autry objected to what they saw as its increasingly racy content. Ultimately, its syndicator decided to cancel the show before Autry could act. Barris' other two shows on the air at the time, The Dating Game and The Gong Show, left the air as well. This was because most local stations did not want anything to do with the controversy, fearing potential boycotts and loss of advertising that might result. Barris' reputation was temporarily ruined.

A special week-long series for Valentine's Day aired on ABC in February 1984 and was the last time the show aired on a broadcast network. The set for the week of specials would later be used for Bob Eubanks' return to The New Newlywed Game in syndication a year later.

Until the GSN series' premiere on October 12, 2009, all subsequent editions of The Newlywed Game were seen in syndication. A revival that aired from 1985 until 1989 was referred to as The New Newlywed Game for the first three and a half years of its run. The last and most recent syndicated Newlywed Game aired new episodes from 1996 until 1999, continued in reruns for an additional season, and was sold to stations as part of an hour-long block with a revival of The Dating Game.

== Production ==
=== Hosts and announcers ===
Founding host Bob Eubanks was the master of ceremonies, or "emcee", who became most often associated with The Newlywed Game. Just 28 years old at the time the show debuted in 1966, he was the youngest emcee to host a game show. Eubanks hosted the ABC and first syndicated series, then returned to host The New Newlywed Game in September 1985. Former Dating Game host Jim Lange hosted the aforementioned week of specials in 1984, as Eubanks was hosting Dream House on NBC at the time, making Lange the only person to host both The Dating Game and The Newlywed Game.

In December 1988, Eubanks stepped down as the host of the series and he was replaced with comedian Paul Rodriguez. The title of the series became The Newlywed Game Starring Paul Rodriguez and remained so for the remainder of the 1988–89 season, after which the series was cancelled after four seasons.

Former Saturday Night Live regular Gary Kroeger hosted the first season of the revival of The Newlywed Game in 1996, which was conducted under a much different format from the previous series. After a year of struggling ratings, Eubanks returned to host and the format was reinstated to the classic Newlywed Game format. He has also hosted several special episodes of the current Newlywed Game, which has made Eubanks the only host to preside over an episode of the same series in six different decades.

The GSN edition was hosted by Carnie Wilson and narrated by Randy West from its debut on April 6, 2009 until the end of its third season on July 16, 2010, when Wilson elected not to return. As noted above, Eubanks hosted two special episodes of this version – one featured Wilson and her husband as well as her sister Wendy, her mother Marilyn, and their husbands; the second featured game show hosts Monty Hall, Peter Marshall, Wink Martindale and their wives. On August 18, 2010, it was announced that The View co-host Sherri Shepherd would take over as host for the fourth season of the show which premiered November 1, 2010. The fifth season premiered on April 18, 2011, with a new logo design, and with Shepherd serving as a narrator in addition to hosting. Shepherd continued taking on the role of host and narrator for the sixth season which premiered on October 25, 2012.

Scott Beach, who was Barris's first choice as host, was the announcer in the very early episodes of The Newlywed Game. After Beach resigned, Barris's primary staff announcer, Johnny Jacobs, took over, continuing as the announcer for the series until the first syndicated version was canceled in 1980. Tony McClay, who was a frequent Jacobs substitute, took over from time to time on the syndicated Newlywed Game. Rod Roddy was the announcer for the ABC specials. When The New Newlywed Game premiered in 1985, Bob Hilton was its announcer. He was replaced by Charlie O'Donnell, whom Barris had signed away from Barry & Enright Productions, in early 1988. O'Donnell continued to announce through the end of the Paul Rodriguez-hosted season, then left Barris to return to his position at Wheel of Fortune, which he held till his death.

Los Angeles radio DJ Ellen K provided the announcing for the first season of the 1996 revival, with John Cramer taking over upon Eubanks's return. For the first season of the 2009 revival Brad Aldous served as the announcer. Randy West took over for the next two seasons, and former host Gary Kroeger took over for West for the fourth season. As of the fifth season, host Shepherd doubled as announcer for the couple introductions and the voice-overs for the prize descriptions.

=== Theme songs ===
The theme music originally started off as a vocal song called "Summertime Guy". The song was written by Chuck Barris for singer Eddie Rambeau, who performed and released the song on a Swan label 45 rpm SP record. Minutes before the song was to be presented on American Bandstand in 1962, ABC informed Rambeau that he couldn't sing the song (because Chuck Barris was an ABC employee at the time), and he performed the B-side of the record instead.

Not wanting the song to go to waste, Barris commissioned Milton DeLugg a few years later to arrange an instrumental version of "Summertime Guy" for use as the first theme to The Newlywed Game. The theme music was performed by the Trumpets Olé in a style similar to Herb Alpert and the Tijuana Brass, and was released as the last track on the LP album "The Trumpets Olé Play Instrumentals". To better fit the show's spirit, DeLugg preceded the pop song's melody with a sample of Mendelssohn's Wedding March.

The theme was re-recorded around 1973 by Frank Jaffe and Michael Stewart. Featured as the third track on the LP album Chuck Barris Presents Themes from TV Game Shows, it was used on The Newlywed Game beginning with the syndicated version in 1977. Then, Milton DeLugg, who was by this time Barris' house musical director, created a new, updated theme based on the existing melody for The New Newlywed Game beginning with Jim Lange's 1984 series of specials, and then for the first several years of the Bob Eubanks-hosted revival.

When Paul Rodriguez took over in 1988, the theme song was changed to the 1950s doo wop classic "Book of Love" by the Monotones, making this the only theme song of the show with lyrics. The Gary Kroeger version featured an entirely new theme; when Eubanks returned, a new recording of the classic theme was used for his first season (arranged by Steve Kaplan & Jim Latham), but dropped in favor of a new theme for the third season by Barry Coffing and John Blaylock.

The GSN version uses an updated looping version of the classic theme composed by Lewis Flinn. For Shepherd's second season, the show's logo, intro, and set was changed, dropping the classic theme.

=== Production companies ===
Chuck Barris Productions produced all versions from 1966 to 1986, with the 1986–89 versions credited to Barris Productions. Columbia TriStar Television (CTT), who owns the Chuck Barris game show library, produced and distributed the 1996–1999 revivals. Embassy Row, a New York-based television production company, produces the Wilson and Shepherd-hosted version for CTT's successor Sony Pictures Television (who owns the formatting rights and, as of January 14, 2009, Embassy Row) and GSN.

== Eligibility ==
Couples that had not yet celebrated their second anniversary were eligible to be contestants. As such, the majority of contestants were young adults. However, due to the rule of "couples being married two years or less", sometimes older couples were eligible, such as widowed senior citizens or divorced middle-aged people who had remarried.

== Gameplay ==
Gameplay involves the host asking a series of provocative questions of a group of four newly-married couples. For the first round, the wives are taken off the stage while the husbands are asked how they think their wives would answer three questions. The wives are then brought back on stage and asked for their answers for the same three questions. Once the wife gives her answer, the husband reveals the answer that he previously gave, which is written on a blue card. Couples receive five points for a match. In the second round, the husbands' and wives' roles are reversed. Gameplay repeats in this fashion until a couple reaches 70 points, at which point that couple receives a prize.

== 1996–97 version ==
The 1996 version features a significantly altered format for its first season. Each spouse is shown a videotape of their mates who gave a statement mostly about their spouse. The tape is paused near the end which gave the spouse in control a chance predict how his/her mate completed the statement. Then the tape plays again, and a correct answer earns 10 points. First the husbands' tapes were shown and the wives guess before the roles are reversed. In the second round, the host asks a multiple-choice question in which one half of the couples had given answers in advance, and the other must guess what they chose. Each match again earns 10 points. In the third round, one half of each couple gives a "weird fact" about himself or herself; the host then reads back the fact, with the other half of each couple attempting to identify if said fact was true of his or her respective partner. The fourth round of gameplay features the host offering a series of two options and the wives holding up cards to indicate which they like more; the husband then does likewise with the same options, with the first match offering 10 points and each subsequent one offering 10 more points than the previous one. As in the prior version of the game, winning the most points awards a prize. For the second season of the 1996-1997 format, gameplay was reverted to the previous style.

=== Same-sex couples ===
In the 2009–10 season, The Newlywed Game had the first same-sex married couples appear on the show. In episode two of the season, the first such couple was Star Trek actor George Takei and his husband, Brad Altman, playing in a special Celebrity Edition of the game, against The Biggest Loser couple Damien Gurganius and Nicole Brewer, and Christopher Knight and Adrienne Curry (My Fair Brady). Takei and Altman won the game and $10,000 for their charity, the Japanese American National Museum. The first non-celebrity same-sex couple, also winning their episode's grand prize package, would appear the following season (2010–11), which coincided with the third season's premiere episode, which aired on June 17, 2010.

== Olga Perez ==
In 1977, a woman named Olga Perez competed on the show, and was asked where the "weirdest place" was that she had ever had sexual intercourse, to which she responded "up the ass". The answer given by her became widely circulated folklore for decades afterward, with many variations and retellings that altered details. Eubanks repeatedly denied that the incident ever occurred until a clip of it from a Game Show Network rerun of the episode was circulated on Snopes, and then it also appeared on a game show blooper special hosted by NBC in 2002. Snopes writer David Mikkelson theorized that Eubanks' denial of the incident ever happening due to the alterations it received in re-tellings, as well as the number of episodes he had hosted and lack of home recordings or reruns of the episode in the intervening years.

== Specials ==
=== The Newlywed Game: A Silver Anniversary of Love and Laughter ===
On April 18, 1998, a special titled The Newlywed Game: A Silver Anniversary of Love and Laughter aired on Game Show Network (GSN) hosted by Bob Eubanks and was announced by Gene Wood (though Wood was never credited) where it looks back at some of the couples who have appeared on the show during the 60's, 70's & 80's incarnations.

=== Cover Story: The Newlywed Game - Most Outrageous Answers ===
On October 28, 2018, an episode of the series Cover Story airing on Game Show Network (GSN) titled Cover Story: The Newlywed Game - Most Outrageous Answers hosted by Trish Suhr, features the most outrageous and hilarious moments from the show that spans over many seasons.

== Episode status ==
Most episodes of the original ABC daytime version are lost, and many of those that do survive are said to have deteriorated. However, a handful have been shown on GSN, most notably the 1974 finale. The ABC nighttime version's status is also unknown for similar reasons, although a few of the evening shows have been shown on GSN's former block "Game Show Saturday Night". Most of the syndicated version exists, and has been rerun on GSN in the past.

In 2009, GSN premiered a new version of The Newlywed Game. The first three seasons were hosted by Carnie Wilson, and since November 1, 2010 have been hosted by Sherri Shepherd. With these two hosts and a combined six seasons, this version has had 430 episodes, 260 with Shepherd and 170 with Wilson.

On March 21, 2012, GSN announced that a sixth season of The Newlywed Game with Sherri Shepherd would air in the 2012–13 television season. The sixth season of The Newlywed Game premiered on GSN on October 25, 2012 at 8:00 p.m., airing four new episodes every Thursday night.

In October 2021, it was announced that classic episodes hosted by Eubanks would air on Buzzr beginning on November 15, 2021, making the series the first Sony-owned property to air on the network. As of February 2022, the network has aired episodes from the 1997-98 season.

== Licensed merchandise ==
Hasbro produced three home editions of The Newlywed Game during its 1960s/70s run on ABC from 1967 and 1969. Prior to this, a special rarely seen red box edition was released in 1979 similar to the Hasbro editions, It even uses the same questions as well. However, the copyright is from "A Chuck Barris Production" instead of Hasbro. Pressman released a version based on the 1985 version in 1986. Currently, classic board games creator Endless Games, which specializes in board games based on several widely popular, long-running television game shows, including The Price Is Right and Million Dollar Password, distributes home versions of The Newlywed Game, including three standard editions (the third titled "Classic" to differentiate itself from the current GSN version), a DVD edition, a "Quick Picks" travel-size edition, and a "Deluxe Edition" which combines the first standard edition game with the DVD edition.

In 1971, Pocket Books published a beginners' cookbook entitled The Newlywed Game Cook Book. It was compiled by Jody Cameron Malis and featured Bob Eubanks' picture on the cover.

A video slot machine based on The Newlywed Game was released by IGT in 2004. It had an animated Jim Lange (who had previously hosted the ABC special in 1984) appearing in the game instead of Bob Eubanks.

The show's original theme music has been released several times on LP and CD, most notably as part of the GSN-approved Classic TV Game Show Themes CD from Varèse Sarabande.

== International versions ==
Country	Local name	Host	Network	Year aired
Australia	The Marriage Game	John Bonney; Malcolm Searle; Garry Meadows; Gordon Boyd	Network Ten	1966–1972
Australia	The Newlywed Game	Ian Turpie	Network Ten; Nine Network	1968; 1987
France	Les Mariés de l'A2	Patrice Laffont; Georges Beller	Antenne 2	1987–1992
France	Les Z'amours	Jean Luc Reichmann; Patrice Laffont; Tex; Bruno Guillon	France 2	1995–2021
Germany	Sie und Er im Kreuzverhör	Peter Frankenfeld	ZDF	1971–1973
Germany	Wilde Ehen	Wolfgang Link	VOX	1997–1998
Indonesia	Bulan Madu	Unknown	SCTV	1995
Italy	Tra moglie e marito	Marco Columbro	Canale 5	1987–1991
Italy	D'amore e d'accordo	Katia Follesa	Real Time	2021
Poland	Nowożeńcy	Jerzy Petersburski jr.	TVP1	1995–1997
Poland	Tylko Ty	Artur Andrus	TV Puls	2007–2008
Russia	Молодожёны; Molodozhyony	Vladimir Tishko	STS	2000–2002
Russia	Медовый месяц Medovyy mesyats	Vladimir Tishko	STS	2002–2003
Spain	Su media naranja	Jesus Puente; Tate Montoya	Telecinco	1990–1996
Spain	Tal para cual	Anabel Alonso	Antena 3	2006
Tunisia	Shreek Al Amor	Jafar Al Guasmi	Télévision Tunisienne 1	2012
Turkey	Evcilik Oyunu	Müjdat Gezen; Füsun Önal	Show TV	1993–1994
Ukraine	Медовий місяць Medovyy misyats	Snezhana Egorova; Dmitry Shevchenko	1+1	2001–2002
United Kingdom	The Newlywed Game	Gloria Hunniford	ITV	1987
Vietnam	Tâm đầu ý hợp	Đức Thịnh; Lâm Vỹ Dạ	HTV7	2020

== See also ==
- Here Come the Newlyweds
- Mr and Mrs
- I'm Telling!
