= The Bob McLean Show =

Canadian television series

- Genre: Talk show
- Country of origin: Canada
- Original language: English
- No. of seasons: 6

Production
- Executive producers: Bill Casselman (1976–1977); Jack Budgell (1978–1981)
- Producers: Jack Budgell; J. Edward Shaw (1976–1977); Robert Smith (1979–1980); Nigel Napier-Andrews (1980); John Johnson (1980–1981)
- Production locations: Toronto, Ontario, Canada
- Running time: 55–60 minutes

Original release
- Network: CBC Television
- Release: 1 September 1975 – 22 May 1981

The Bob McLean Show is a Canadian talk show that aired on CBC Television from 1975 to 1981.

== Premise ==
CBC Television created this series in 1975 to replace Elwood Glover's Luncheon Date whose host had left the network for another Toronto-based broadcaster. Bob McLean hosted this new talk show from the lower floor of the Cumberland Terrace, a small downtown Toronto shopping centre at Yonge and Bloor.

From the second season, the series featured an increasing proportion of Canadian guests and subjects. In 1979, the series travelled from its normal Toronto studio with episodes produced in various Canadian cities such as Halifax, Ottawa and Vancouver.

The Royal Canadian Air Farce's Roger Abbott and Don Ferguson were frequently seen on the series as were comedians Howie Mandel and Monica Parker. Jimmy Dale was the series musical director.

== Scheduling ==
This series was broadcast as follows (times in Eastern), normally an hour duration except as noted:

Time	Season run		Notes
12:00 p.m.	1 September 1975	2 July 1976	55 minutes duration
12:00 p.m.	6 September 1976	1 July 1977	
12:00 p.m.	5 September 1977	3 April 1978	55 minutes duration
1:00 p.m.	3 April 1978	4 August 1978	
1:00 p.m.	4 September 1978	1 April 1979	
3:00 p.m.	2 April 1979	29 June 1979	
3:00 p.m.	10 September 1979	27 June 1980	
12:30 p.m.	8 September 1980	22 May 1981	
12:30 p.m.	25 May 1981	28 September 1981	rebroadcasts

Highlights from the series were compiled as The Best of Bob McLean which was broadcast on Saturdays in 1976 and 1977 between regular television seasons.
