= Spin-Off (American game show) =

- Created by: Nick Nicholson; E. Roger Muir
- Directed by: Bob Schwarz
- Presented by: Jim Lange
- Announcer: Johnny Jacobs
- Country of origin: United States
- No. of episodes: 60

Production
- Executive producers: Nick Nicholson; E. Roger Muir; Barbara Horn
- Producer: Willie Stein
- Running time: 30 minutes
- Production company: Nicholson-Muir Productions

Original release
- Network: CBS
- Release: June 16 – September 5, 1975

Spin-Off is an American game show created and produced by Nick Nicholson and E. Roger Muir for CBS in 1975 that was based on the dice game Yahtzee. The series was hosted by Jim Lange and announced by Johnny Jacobs. The show replaced The Joker's Wild on CBS' daytime schedule and debuted on June 16, 1975, but was cancelled after twelve weeks on September 5, 1975, being replaced the following Monday by Give-n-Take, which was also hosted by Lange. Spin-Off originated in Studios 31, 33 and 41 at Television City in Hollywood, California.

The theme song was remixed in another Nicholson-Muir game show Super Pay Cards.

== Gameplay ==
Two couples competed, one of which were the returning champions. Behind each couple was a set of five "spinners" — rapidly changing eggcrate displays that flashed numbers from 1 to 6 at the rate of 17 digits per second. The couples competed for control of the spinners in order to build the best possible hand of five numbers, similar to the dice game Yahtzee.

The host asked a toss-up question open to all four players. A correct buzz-in answer by a couple awarded them control of their spinners, while a miss gave control to the opponents. The couple in control pressed one button to start their spinners, then stopped one at a time by pressing a separate button for that spinner. The couple could either keep the hand they had spun or try to win control on a new toss-up. If they succeeded, they could re-spin some or all of the previous digits in the hope of improving their hand.

After one couple either took a total of three spins or chose to keep their hand, the opponents were given one more spin to form a better hand. The couple with the higher hand won money as shown below.

Hand	Award
One Pair	$50
Two Pair	$75
Three of a Kind	$100
Straight	$125
Full House	$150
Four of a Kind	$175
Five of a Kind	$200

If both couples formed hands of equal ranks, the one using higher numbers won, similar to poker. For example, 5-5-5-4-3 (three 5's) would beat 3-3-3-2-1 (three 3's). Straights had to contain five consecutive numbers in any order.

The first couple to amass at least $250 (later $200) won the championship and advanced to the Super Spin-Off bonus round. Both couples kept their money. Champions remained on the show until they were defeated or reached $25,000 in total winnings.

=== Super Spin-Off ===
In the Super Spin-Off, the champions could win up to $10,000 more by building the best hand possible. They operated one spinner at a time, with a maximum of three spins per digit. Once they either used all three spins or chose to move on, the displayed digit was automatically added to their hand.

In order to win the top prize, the couple had to spin a five-number straight with all the numbers reading in either ascending or descending order from left to right. No money was awarded for straights with the numbers in any other order during the Super Spin-Off.

Hand	Award
One Pair	$250
Two Pair	$500
Three of a Kind	$1,000
Full House	$1,500
Four of a Kind	$2,000
Five of a Kind	$5,000
1-2-3-4-5; 2-3-4-5-6; 5-4-3-2-1; 6-5-4-3-2	$10,000
