= Give-n-Take =

- Give-n-Take logo.
- Directed by: Bill Carruthers
- Presented by: Jim Lange
- Announcer: Johnny Jacobs
- Theme music composer: Stan Worth
- Country of origin: United States
- No. of episodes: 60

Production
- Production locations: CBS Television City; Hollywood, California
- Running time: approx. 26 Minutes
- Production companies: The Carruthers Company; Warner Bros. Television

Original release
- Network: CBS
- Release: September 8 – November 28, 1975

Give-n-Take is an American television game show which ran on CBS from September 8 to November 28, 1975. Jim Lange hosted, with Johnny Jacobs announcing. The series, which replaced Spin-Off (also hosted by Lange and announced by Jacobs), ended after 60 episodes.

== Gameplay ==
Four female contestants competed to accumulate prizes with a total value as close to $5,000 as possible without going over. The returning champion and three challengers each sat in one portion of an eight-space board shaped like a daisy, with a neutral "advantage space" separating each contestant from her neighbors to either side. Values of individual prizes were not revealed at any time during the game.

Each contestant was spotted one prize to start the game. A prize was then described to the contestants, and Lange asked a toss-up question. The contestant who buzzed in and gave the correct answer took control of all four advantage spaces for that turn in addition to her own, giving her a total of five spaces. Each of the other three contestants controlled only the space in which she sat. The contestant in control pressed her buzzer to stop a large spinning arrow at the center of the board. The contestant on whose space the arrow stopped won control of the prize and could choose to either add it to her bank, pass it to an opponent, or add it to her bank and pass a different prize.

After a prize was assigned, a bell or buzzer sounded to indicate whether that contestant's bank value was under or over $5,000, respectively. The actual value of the bank was never revealed; only whether or not it was below the $5,000 target. Play then repeated in the same manner, with a new prize described.

A contestant could freeze after any turn if she thought she was close to $5,000, and any contestant whose bank exceeded this total was automatically frozen. A frozen contestant was still eligible to answer toss-ups, but could not have any prizes passed to her. If the arrow stopped on her during a spin, the prize at stake for that turn was carried over to the bonus round and she had to pass one of her own prizes in order to reduce her bank. Once her bank total fell below $5,000, the freeze was lifted.

After seven spins, the bank totals were announced and the contestant closest to $5,000 without going over won the game and the championship, kept her banked prizes, and advanced to the bonus round. If three of the four contestants became frozen, the unfrozen one automatically won the game. Defeated contestants received parting gifts.

=== Bonus round ===
The champion selected one of the four contestants' seats and had one chance to stop the arrow on it. Doing so awarded all prizes described in that day's main game, in addition to everything she had already won.

Champions stayed on the show for a maximum of five days, or until they reached the $25,000 winnings limit that was in effect for CBS game shows at the time.

== Broadcast history ==
Give-n-Take debuted on September 8, 1975, at 10:00 am Eastern (9:00 am Central/Mountain/Pacific), replacing the Nicholson-Muir series Spin-Off and facing NBC's Celebrity Sweepstakes (ABC did not program at 10:00 and had returned the 10:30 slot to its affiliates in 1969).

The series moved to 4:00 pm (3:00 Central) on November 3, as a result to the expansion of The Price Is Right to sixty minutes, replacing Musical Chairs. It struggled in the ratings for its last four weeks against the soap Somerset on NBC and a revival of You Don't Say! on ABC. Give-n-Take was replaced by reruns of All in the Family on December 1, in a scheduling shuffle with Match Game '75 and Tattletales.

== See also ==
- Say When!! (1961–1965 game show similar to Give-n-Take)
