= Art James =

American TV game show host (1929–2004)

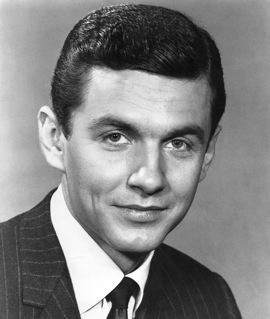
- James in 1967
- Born: Arthur Simeonovich Efimchick; October 15, 1929; Dearborn, Michigan, U.S.
- Died: March 28, 2004 (aged 74); Palm Springs, California, U.S.
- Occupations: Game show presenter, host, announcer
- Years active: 1958–2000
- Spouses: Jane Hamilton (m. 1957; div. 1981); Sandy Pietron (m. 1991)
- Children: 2

Art James (born Arthur Simeonovich Efimchick; October 15, 1929 – March 28, 2004) was an American game-show host, best known for shows such as The Who, What, or Where Game; It's Academic; and Pay Cards! He was also the announcer and substitute host on the game show Concentration.

== Biography ==
James was born in Dearborn, Michigan, to Russian immigrants (fluent in Russian, he taught English to Russian immigrants). He attended Wayne State University in nearby Detroit, where he studied engineering. He worked as an announcer for the Armed Forces Network while stationed in Germany after World War II.

An old Army friend, who was an executive with NBC, asked James to audition for a new game show, Concentration, hosted by Hugh Downs, which needed an announcer. Concentration ran from 1958–73, and was NBC's longest-running game show. He went on to either announce or host over a dozen game shows, including Say When!!; It's Academic; The Who, What, or Where Game; Pay Cards!; Temptation; The Joker's Wild; Blank Check; The Magnificent Marble Machine; Concentration; Catchphrase; and Tic-Tac-Dough. He also made an appearance in Kevin Smith's movie Mallrats.

He started Art James Productions in 1975 with his business partner and producer, Dan Cross. Their joint company staged game shows that were specially created to communicate marketing and corporate strategies to key stakeholders of Fortune 500 companies.

One episode of Say When! included a classic blooper by James while doing a live in-show commercial for Peter Pan peanut butter; during the sales pitch, he dropped a knife into the near-empty glass jar, breaking out the bottom and causing the knife to fall through. Though he struggled to keep from laughing, and because a retake was impossible, James still finished the commercial. The gaffe has been shown on many blooper specials.

== Later years and death ==
James was a frequent contributor to TV Guide, writing about the world of game shows. He was living in Chaska, Minnesota, at the end of his life, and died of unspecified natural causes during a visit to his brother in Palm Springs, California.

Media offices
Preceded by Bill McCord	Voice, Concentration; 1958–61	Succeeded by Jim Lucas (1961–65)
