= Bobby Nicholson =

American actor and producer (1918–1993)

- Born: Robert Albert Nicholson; April 29, 1918
- Died: September 23, 1993 (aged 75); Jacksonville, Florida, U.S.
- Other name: Nick Nicholson
- Occupations: Actor; musician; director; producer
- Years active: 1930s–1983
- Known for: The Newlywed Game
- Spouse: Jane Torgler (m. 1942)
- Children: 2

Robert Albert Nicholson, also known as "Bobby Nicholson" and "Nick Nicholson" (April 29, 1918 – September 23, 1993) was an American actor, musician, director and producer.

== Biography ==
Nicholson was a trombonist who played in big bands of the 1930s and 1940s. After a tour of duty in World War II, and more work with dance bands in the Buffalo New York area, he was hired in October 1952 by NBC director E. Roger Muir, at the request of Bob Smith (who Nicholson had worked with in Buffalo), for The Howdy Doody Show, formerly known as "Puppet Playhouse". Nicholson played various characters during the show's early years, among them J. Cornelius "Corny" Cobb. He assumed the role of Clarabell the Clown, after the show's original Clarabell, Bob Keeshan, was fired in late 1952 over a salary dispute. At Nicholson's request, he was replaced as Clarabell by musician Lew Anderson in 1954 and reverted to his role of Corny Cobb, which he kept until the end of the show in 1960. Nicholson also assumed the voice roles for several of the puppets after Allen Swift left the show in 1956.

Prior to joining The Howdy Doody Show, Nicholson formed the studio Soundac, which is best known for producing the animated series Colonel Bleep. After Nicholson left, Robert D. Buchanan took his place.

Nicholson got his nickname of "Nick" on the show, as there were up to six men named "Bob" on the cast and crew at any given time.

He was also kept busy at NBC as a staff conductor of the NBC Symphony for ten years, including the early (pre-Doc Severinsen) years of "The Tonight Show", when Skitch Henderson wasn't available for the show. He also did musical arrangements for various NBC shows and for many performers. Along with Muir under their company "Nicholson-Muir Productions", he helped create and produce several game shows, most notably the first two versions of The Newlywed Game.

Nicholson also assumed the role of Corny Cobb for the revival of Howdy Doody in 1976–1977 and at a 40-year anniversary special in 1987.

Nicholson spent most of the later years of his life as a trombonist, conductor, arranger, and composer. He was one of the founders of the Westchester Philharmonic in 1983, for which he also served as principal conductor, and he was also one of the founders of the Florida Symphonic Pops (later the Boca Raton Symphonic Pops).

== Personal life ==
Nicholson was the son of Malcom Nicholson (1890–1967) and Ida Mendelsohn (1893–1980).

He married Jane Torgler in 1942 while in the Army during World War II. They had two children. Mavis Leno is his daughter.

Nicholson died on September 23, 1993, in Jacksonville, Florida.

== Legacy ==
Nicholson has a scholarship in his honor, "The Nick Nicholson Music Scholarship Fund", at Palm Beach Community College.
