= Allen Swift =

American voice actor (1924–2010)

- Born: Ira Stadlen; January 16, 1924; New York City, U.S.
- Died: April 18, 2010 (aged 86); New York City, U.S.
- Occupation: Voice actor
- Years active: 1946–2000
- Spouse: Lenore Loveman
- Children: Lewis J. Stadlen, Maxime Zahra, and Clare A. Stadlen

Ira J. Stadlen (January 16, 1924 – April 18, 2010), known professionally as Allen Swift, was an American actor, writer and magician, best known as a voiceover artist who voiced cartoon characters Simon Bar Sinister and Riff-Raff on the Underdog cartoon show. He took his professional name from radio comedian Fred Allen and 18th century satirist Jonathan Swift.

== Early life and education ==
He was born on January 16, 1924, in Washington Heights, Manhattan, and raised in Brooklyn. Swift graduated from the High School of Music & Art, after which he enlisted in the United States Army Air Forces, where he served from November 1942 to November 1945. While in the Army, he was an entertainer and became a private first class.

== Career ==
=== Children's television ===
Allen Swift was an early television star who began his career by replacing Buffalo Bob Smith on The Howdy Doody Show while Smith was recovering from a heart attack. At various times, he played the characters of Clarabell the Clown, Chief Thunderchicken, and the voice of the Howdy Doody puppet, as well as other characters. From September 10, 1956, to September 23, 1960, Swift was the host of another popular children's show, The Popeye Show, on WPIX in New York City, playing a sea captain named "Captain Allen Swift". In the show, he commented on the cartoons, told stories, sang sea shanties and did magic tricks.

=== Cartoon voices ===
Swift was best known for providing the fiendish voices for the cartoon villains Simon Bar Sinister and Riff-Raff on the Underdog cartoon show, and Popeye in the Popeye cartoons created in the 1960s. He also voiced the cartoon character, Clint Clobber.

Swift voiced the cartoon mascot Twinkie the Kid in animated TV advertisements for Hostess's cream-filled snack cakes, Twinkies, in the 1970s. He also voiced many of the characters in the 1960s underwater puppet show Diver Dan, and Gene Deitch's 1961–1962 group of Tom and Jerry cartoons, as well as The Bluffers. According to Mopar magazine, he was also the voice of "Tech" for their series of service training films, providing color commentary and dry humor to help keep things digestible and interesting. He also voiced his talents for Sesame Street.

=== Rankin/Bass ===
Swift provided the majority of the voices in Rankin/Bass's Mad Monster Party?, credited as Alan Swift in the movie's credits. He was also in other Rankin/Bass productions, including the TV specials, The Enchanted World of Danny Kaye: The Emperor's New Clothes, as the voice of Musty, and as the voice of Gadzooks the Bear in The Easter Bunny Is Comin' to Town.

=== Howdy Doody ===
Swift supplied most of the character voices for the NBC Howdy Doody show. When Buffalo Bob Smith — who did the voice of the lead puppet character Howdy Doody, and had proclaimed many times that "nobody else could do Howdy" — suffered a heart attack, Swift took home some recordings over the weekend, came back Monday, and supplied Howdy's voice for more than a year.

=== Writing ===
Swift became the second comedy writer for Howdy Doody following the abrupt departure of the series' first comedy writer and songwriter, Edward Kean. He also wrote the play Checking Out, which was the basis of the film of the same name starring Peter Falk, Laura San Giacomo, Judge Reinhold and David Paymer.

Toward the end of his life, Swift penned the memoir, Chutzpah! Hi-Diddle-Dee-Dee, An Actors Life for Me.

=== Commercials and MAD magazine ===
Swift provided the original voice of the Frito Bandito in the animated Fritos Corn Chips commercials of the 1960s. In the 1970s and 1980s, he was the talking drain in Drano television commercials, the voice of the Mirinda Craver in Jim Henson's Mirinda commercials, and the voice of The Burger King. Because of his uncanny ability to create so many different sounds, tones and accents, he was able to voice competing products, including Tip-Top, Braun, Stroehmann or Taystee. He impersonated Carroll O'Connor as Archie Bunker and Adolf Hitler as "Dolf" on MAD magazine's vinyl insert recording of "Gall in the Family Fare", the All in the Family satire that ran in the magazine's Super Special No. 11 in 1973. He also played Captain Cupcake in the Hostess Brands commercials.

== Personal life ==
Swift was married to actress Lenore Loveman, and was the father of 3 children, including actor Lewis J. Stadlen. He died in his home in Manhattan at the age of 86 on April 18, 2010.

== Filmography ==
Years	Film/Show	Roles	Notes
1947–60	Howdy Doody	Most of the characters' voices	
1956–60	The Popeye Show	Host	
1960–63	King Leonardo and His Short Subjects	Odie Cologne, Itchy Brother, Tooter Turtle, narrator in "King and Odie" segments	
1961–62	Tom and Jerry	Tom/Jerry/The Grumpy Owner/Various Others	Gene Deitch era
1964–67	Underdog	Simon Bar Sinister/Riff Raff	
1960s	Fritos Commercials	Frito Bandito	
1966–67	The Beagles	Tubby, Scotty	
1967	Mad Monster Party?	Count Dracula, Igor, the Monster, Claude the Invisible Man, Ghoul the Invisible Boy, Boobula (Count Dracula's son), Ron Chanley the Werewolf, Dr. Jekyll and Mr. Hyde, Rosebud the vulture, Harold, Harvey, Post Office Boss	
1971–72, 1976	Sesame Street	Voices in three animated segments	
1972	The Enchanted World of Danny Kaye	Mufti, Ivan	TV special
1974	Where the Wild Things Are	Narration (original soundtrack)	Film animated by Gene Deitch, Book by Maurice Sendak
1974	Twas the Night Before Christmas	Santa Claus, City Clerk, Councilman #1	TV show
1976	Checking Out	Wrote and starred on Broadway	
1980	Pinocchio's Christmas	The Fox, Santa Claus, Mr. Cherry	
1985	The Equalizer	Monty Wynn	Episode: "Back Home"
1986	The Bluffers	Many characters	
2000	Courage the Cowardly Dog	Hunchback	Final role
