= Photo Doody =

Howdy Doody marionette

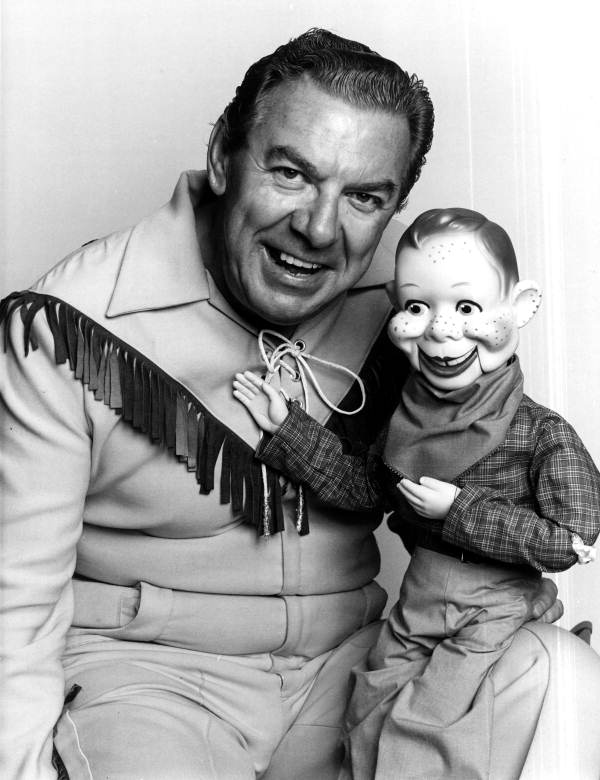
Photo Doody in a publicity shot with Buffalo Bob Smith, 1972.

Photo Doody is one of the three original Howdy Doody 1940s marionettes. He is the Howdy figure that was used in Howdy Doody still photo sessions for the Howdy Doody Show and the publicity pictures taken with Buffalo Bob Smith. The near-stringless Howdy marionette was also used in personal appearances and parades. His arm joints and legs were specially built to hold a pose for advertising and marketing photography. He sat easily in Buffalo Bob Smith's lap.

Photo Doody, made of carved wood, is 30" tall. His face is hand-painted with blue eyes; he has red hair, a gap-tooth grin, pronounced ears and 48 freckles (one for each of the states at the time when the show first went on the air). He wears a western style outfit consisting of blue jeans, a plaid shirt, cowboy boots and a red bandanna.

== From prop to the private market ==
Prior to sale, Roger Muir, executive producer of The Howdy Doody Show, owned the puppet. In 1983 Photo Doody was mutilated by vandals who broke into the New York NBC office of Muir. Puppeteers successfully repaired the damage but Photo Doody still bears neck "scars" where the vandals pulled his head off.

Photo Doody sold at Leland's auction house in 1997 for $113,432 to a private collector. The Howdy Doody sale made international print and broadcast headline news. Following the 1997 auction, Art and Antiques Magazine named Photo Doody one of the world's "Top 100 Treasures" for 1997. In 1998 the Palm Beach Daily News (The Shiny Sheet), a Palm Beach Post newspaper, identified TJ Fisher as the Photo Doody high bidder. A "Howdy Doody Comes to Town" front-page feature story profiled Fisher taking Howdy around town in a convertible and dining out with him at local restaurants.

Photo Doody is the only original Howdy Doody prop-marionette to ever be privately owned. The other two screen-used Howdy puppets are museum property — the one used in the show remains on display at the Detroit Institute of Arts; and the other ("Double Doody") is on permanent exhibition at the Smithsonian.

== The TV show ==
The half-hour Howdy Doody Show was the first children's program to appear on TV. The pioneering show set the pattern for many children's programs. A near-record 2,343 episodes aired during its 13-year NBC national TV stint from 1947 to 1960. During the show's heyday, Howdy received 1,500 pieces of mail a week.

The program's host, Buffalo Bob Smith created the Howdy character for radio and performed the voice of Howdy on television. Actual fabrication of the various Howdy puppets fell to the show's props and puppetry specialists: Rufus Rose, Velma Wayne Dawson, and Scott Brinker.

The show was among the first color TV productions —in part to promote the sale of color television sets (NBC, which aired the show, was owned by TV-maker RCA). Beginning in 1950, the NBC test pattern featured a picture of Howdy. Photo Doody was the model for the NBC test pattern.

With hundreds of thousands of children in the television viewing audience glued to their TV sets at 5:30 p.m. weekdays, each show opened with Buffalo Bob asking —"Say, kids, what time is it?" The children in the studio audience "peanut gallery" responded in unison, "It's Howdy Doody time!"

Buffalo Bob Smith did commercials for Wonder Bread, Campbell Soup, Hostess Twinkies and other sponsors that were new to television; it taught marketers the strength of marketing to children.
