= Checking Out =

Checking Out may refer to:

- Checking Out (1989 film), an American comedy film with Jeff Daniels
- Checking Out (2005 film), a 2005 film with Laura San Giacomo and Peter Falk
- Checking Out (play), a 1976 Broadway play by Allen Swift
- "Checking Out" (Doctors), a 2004 television episode
