= Guste =

Guste is a surname. Notable people with the surname include:

- Roy F. Guste (1951–2021), American chef and cookbook writer
- William J. Guste (1922–2013), American lawyer and businessman
