= Lee Barron =

Lee Barron may refer to:

- Lee Barron (musician) (1915–1993), American big band leader and radio and TV personality
- Lee Barron (politician) (born 1970), British trade unionist and Labour Party politician
- Lee Barron (rugby union) (born 2001), Irish rugby union player
