= Lew Anderson =

American actor and musician (1922–2006)

- Born: Lewis Burr Anderson; May 7, 1922; Kirkman, Iowa, U.S.
- Died: May 14, 2006 (aged 84); Hawthorne, New York, U.S.
- Occupations: actor and musician

Lewis Burr Anderson (May 7, 1922 – May 14, 2006) was an American actor and musician. He is widely known by TV fans as the third and final actor to portray Clarabell the Clown on Howdy Doody between 1954 and 1960. He famously spoke Clarabell's only line on the show's final episode in 1960, with a tear visible in his right eye, "Goodbye, kids." Anderson is also widely known by jazz music fans as a prolific jazz arranger, big band leader, and alto saxophonist. Anderson also played the clarinet.

== Early years ==
Anderson was born in Kirkman, Iowa, the son of a railroad telegrapher. He began playing his sister's clarinet when she tired of it, and by high school had formed his own dance band. After a year in junior college in Fort Dodge, Iowa, he received a music scholarship to Drake University in Des Moines. He attended for two years, but then quit school to begin his professional musical life by accepting a job with the Lee Barron Orchestra, a territory band based out of Omaha.

During World War II, Anderson served in the United States Navy where he started his first band. While in the Navy, he served aboard the USS Howard W. Gilmore (AS-16), a submarine tender which supplied submarines and other ships.

After serving in the U.S. Navy in World War II, he joined the Carlos Molinas Latin Orchestra, where he also wrote the American dance arrangements. In the late 1940s, he joined The Honey Dreamers, a singing group which appeared on radio and early television shows like The Ed Sullivan Show. Following their TV debut on the "Dave Garroway Show", the group performed on the "Kay Kaiser Show", for Steve Allen and on the "Colgate Comedy Hour" with Dean Martin & Jerry Lewis. While working with the group, he met "Buffalo" Bob Smith who offered him the role of Clarabell on the Howdy Doody show. Prior to that, a producer of the show had asked him, "can you juggle - no"; "do magic - no"; "what do you do - nothing!" "he says, perfect!". Anderson again played Clarabell on the short-lived "New Howdy Doody Show" in 1976-1977 and in the 1987 40th anniversary special and made personal appearances as Clarabell with Buffalo Bob throughout the 80's and 90's.

Anderson also wrote many of the TV jingles for the 1950s and 1960s, including for Pepsi and Buick. Many of the jingles were performed by his group "The Honey Dreamers."

== Lew Anderson All-American Big Band ==
After working six-years as Clarabell, Anderson returned to music. In 1989, he formed a 16-piece jazz orchestra — The Lew Anderson All-American Big Band — which began playing Fridays from 5:45 to 7:45 PM at the Red Blazer, Too, 349 West 46th Street, Manhattan, New York. The venue is currently occupied by Swing 46 Jazz & Supper Club. Anderson secured the gig through Al "Jazzbeaux" Collins, who, in 1989, proposed the idea to Denis Carey, co-owner of Red Blazer, Too. The band began an eight-year stint at Red Blazer Too. Musicians in 1990 included saxophonist Aaron Sachs and trombonist John Fedchock. The band members were mostly musicians with steady jobs in recording studios and the pit orchestras of Broadway musicals. The early evening time-slot allowed his musicians to get to their theater jobs for the 8 o'clock curtain. Red Blazer, Too, closed on June 1, 1997, after its landlord doubled the rent.

In 1997, before Red Blazer, Too, had closed, composer, producer, and owner of Sovereign Records, Inc., Ruby Fisher (Reuben Fischer; 1923–2009) invited Don Kennedy of radio's "Big Band Jump" show to come up from Atlanta to host "Live at the Blazer!" The one-hour program aired June 14, 1997 on Jump's 130 stations, was re-broadcast in August on New York's WQEW and now constitutes Live at the Blazer! The Lew Anderson Big Band, Sovereign CDSOV-506, joining the band's previous Sovereign albums, Feelin' Good, Yeah and Fired Up.

In August 1997, The Lew Anderson Big Band began an open-ended engagement at Birdland, then on the Upper Wide Side of Manhattan. The introduction to Birdland was made by American Music Projects' Janet Solesky (born 1949). The band, until Anderson's death, remained in residence during the same time — early set, Fridays — at Birdland Jazz Club.

== Selected discography ==
Lew Anderson Big Band

- Lew Anderson Big Band Live

Recorded live (radio broadcast), March 8, 1974, at the Half Note Club, West 54th Street, New York City
Lew Anderson (leader), Bob Millikan (nl), Dean Pratt, Chuck Winfield (es) (trumpets), Eddie Bert, Sonny Costanza (trombone), Lew Anderson, Frank Strozier (alto saxes), Neil Slater (piano), Joe Cocuzzo (drums), others unknown
Radio broadcast on WLTW, under its former call letters, WRVR: "Jazz Adventures," two sets of the Lew Anderson Orchestra; Jack TaFoya (born 1932) was the announcer

- Lew Anderson All American Big Band Sea Breeze Jazz (1986)

Recorded at J.A.C. Studio, New York, May 6–8, 1983
Personnel includes drummer Dave Weckl
OCLC 15275068

- Feelin' Good, Yeah, Sovereign Records (1989)

Recorded at A & R Studios, New York, 1989
Lew Anderson (alto saxophone); Vinnie Riccitelli (né Vincent S. Riccitelli; 1926–2025) (alto saxophone); Leo Ursini, Ken Hitchcock (tenor saxophone); Aaron Sachs (baritone saxophone); Glenn Drewes, Frank Fighera, Joe Mosello, John Marshall (trumpet); John Fedchock, Wyn Walshe, Fred Simmons, Dale Turk (trombone); Ray Kennedy (electric piano, synthesizer); Paul Adamy (bass); Tony Tedesco (drums)
Re-issued as a CD in 1996
Produced by Ruby Fisher (né Reuben Fischer; 1923–2009)
OCLC 317677053

- Fired Up, Sovereign Records (1992)

Recorded at Crossroads Recording Studio, New York, 1992
Personnel includes trumpeter Greg Gisbert and trombonist John Fedchock
OCLC 30877484

- The New Four Freshmen, Voices in Standards, Hindsight Records (1994)

Recorded October and November 1993 (no date given), Los Angeles
Final mix: January 1994
Vocalists: Greg Stegeman (lead), Mike Beisner (2nd tenor), Kevin Stout (baritone), Bob Ferreira (bass)
Big band: Lew Anderson (leader, alto sax), Vinnie Riccitelli (alto sax, clarinet, flute), Gary Topper (bari sax), Tom Olin (flute, bari sax, bass clarinet), Brent Stanton (flute, clarinet, tenor sax), Rob Middleton (flute, clarinet, tenor sax), Bruce Eidem (trombone), John Fedchock (trombone), Wyn Walshe (trombone), Dale Turk (bass trombone), Greg Gisbert (trumpet, flugelhorn), Joe Mosello (trumpet, flugelhorn), Mike Ponella (trumpet, flugelhorn), Tony Kadleck (trumpet, flugelhorn), Tom Kirchmer (bass), Tommy Igoe (pl) (drums), Ray Kennedy (keyboards)
Recording Engineer: Phil Bulla (né Philip A. Bulla; born 1954)
HCD 801 (Hindsight catalog number)
OCLC 31470464, 959268492

- At His Very Best, featuring Steve Clayton, Sovereign Records (1995)

Recorded in various locations & dates, c. 1995
Personnel includes pianist Derek Smith, bassist Milt Hinton, and drummer Bobby Rosengarden
OCLC 35712774

- Live At The Blazer! Sovereign Records (1998)

Recorded at the Red Blazer, New York, 1998
OCLC 71836985

- "Something Makes Me Want To Dance With You" - Voice and Trumpet of Rob Zappulla

Arranged by Lew Anderson
Recorded at Carriage House Studios, 2000
Recording engineer: Phil Bulla
Woodwinds: Jon Ball, John Mastroianni, Kris Jensen, Joe Meo, Lisa Ladone
Trumpets: Dave Trigg, Tony Kadleck, Dave Spier, John Ragan, Hank Zorn
Trombones: Steve Bleifuss, Leroy Loomer, Dave Sporny, Dan Innaimo
French Horns: Paul Riggio, Eric Davis
Piano/Keyboards: James Argiro
Guitar: Rich Goldstein
Bass: Tom Pietrycha
Drums: Paul Hannah
(c) Rob Zappulla Music

== Death ==
Anderson died in Hawthorne, New York, from complications of prostate cancer.

On March 23, 2006, The Birdland Big Band — which at that time was composed entirely of his former band members (directed by Tommy Igoe) — performed and recorded a tribute to his life.

== Former members of Anderson's big bands ==
- Vinnie Riccitelli (né Vincent S. Riccitelli; 1926–2025), also sax
- Bob McCoy, trumpet
- John Lanni, saxophone
- Wyn Walshe, trombone
- Ken Rizzo, bass
