= Grand Lake Stream, Maine =

- Plantation
- Location within Maine Location within the United States
- Coordinates: 45°14′47″N 67°44′20″W
- Country: United States
- State: Maine
- County: Washington

Area
  - Total: 48.7 sq mi (126.1 km^{2})
  - Land: 44.2 sq mi (114.5 km^{2})
  - Water: 4.5 sq mi (11.7 km^{2})
- Elevation: 289 ft (88 m)

Population (2020)
  - Total: 125
  - Density: 2.83/sq mi (1.09/km^{2})
- Time zone: UTC-5 (Eastern (EST))
  - Summer (DST): UTC-4 (EDT)
- ZIP code: 04668
- Area code: 207
- FIPS code: 23-28660
- GNIS feature ID: 582496

Grand Lake Stream is a plantation in Washington County, Maine, United States. The population was 125 at the 2020 census.

The town Grand Lake Stream is named after the stream that flows through it, which is notable for its excellent landlocked salmon fishery and a fishing tradition that dates to the middle of the 19th century. It also has a long, local tradition of hand-built wooden canoes, ideal for navigating the waters of nearby West Grand Lake.

While the year-round population of Grand Lake Stream is relatively small, there are many visitors in the spring, summer and fall for fishing, hunting, and general relaxation purpose. There are a number of lodges, cabins, and guiding services available. There is also a very active local land trust based in the middle of town, which owns and manages a large portion of the nearby forests and wetlands. Each summer, Grand Lake Stream is also the site of a meeting of prominent American economists.

== Geography ==
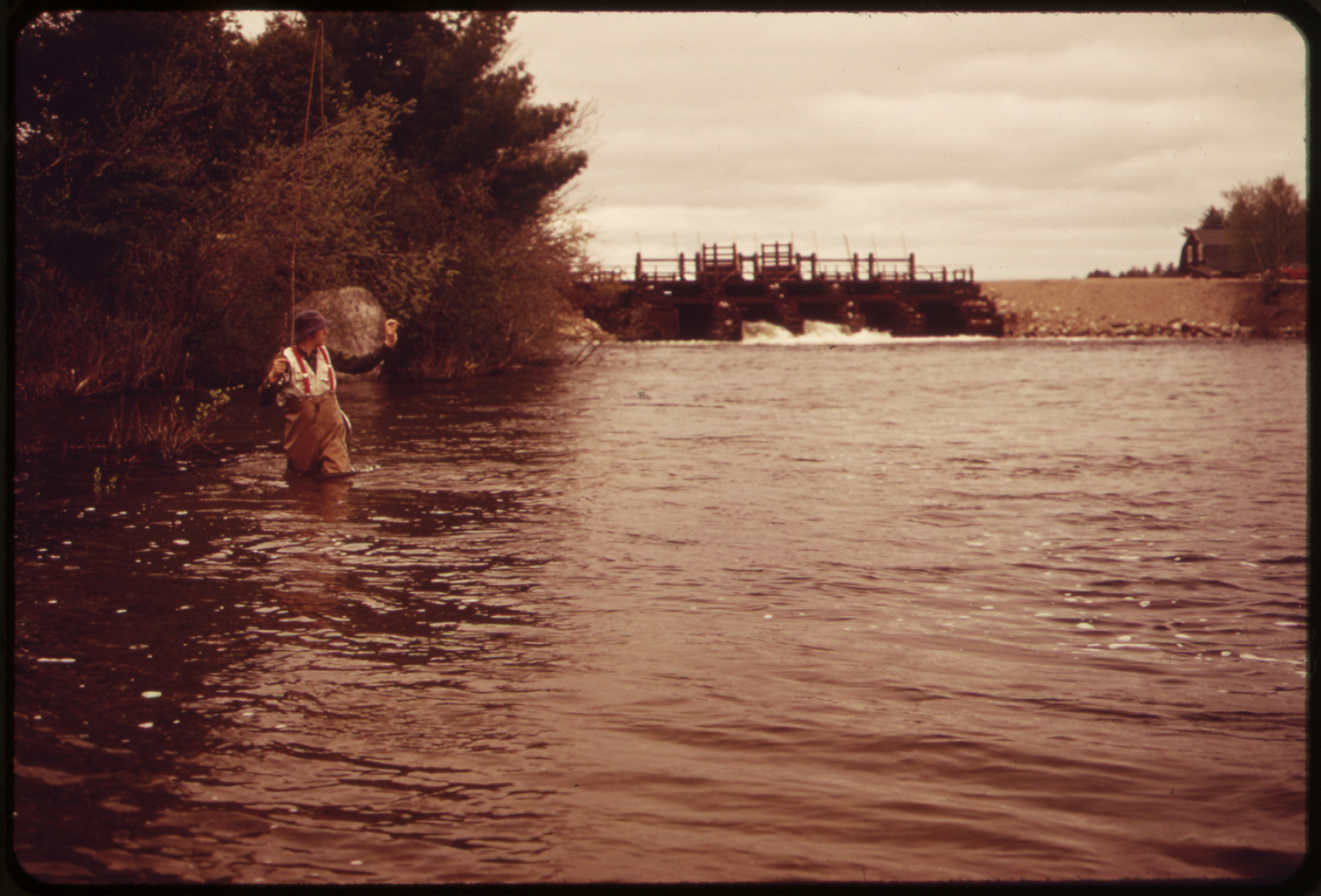
Fly fishing on Grand Lake Stream in the 1970s

According to the United States Census Bureau, the plantation has a total area of 48.7 square miles (126 km^{2}), of which 44.2 square miles (114 km^{2}) is land and 4.5 square miles (12 km^{2}), or 9.26%, is water.

=== Climate ===
According to the Köppen Climate Classification system, Grand Lake Stream has a humid continental climate, abbreviated "Dfb" on climate maps.

Climate data for Grand Lake Stream, Maine (1991–2020 normals, extremes 1961–present)
Month	Jan	Feb	Mar	Apr	May	Jun	Jul	Aug	Sep	Oct	Nov	Dec	Year
Record high °F (°C)	61 (16)	68 (20)	85 (29)	82 (28)	95 (35)	101 (38)	97 (36)	101 (38)	94 (34)	84 (29)	74 (23)	62 (17)	101 (38)
Mean maximum °F (°C)	49.7 (9.8)	49.3 (9.6)	57.0 (13.9)	71.2 (21.8)	83.5 (28.6)	88.6 (31.4)	89.9 (32.2)	89.8 (32.1)	85.4 (29.7)	73.9 (23.3)	63.9 (17.7)	54.0 (12.2)	92.6 (33.7)
Mean daily maximum °F (°C)	27.2 (−2.7)	29.9 (−1.2)	38.7 (3.7)	50.7 (10.4)	63.6 (17.6)	72.5 (22.5)	78.2 (25.7)	77.6 (25.3)	70.0 (21.1)	57.0 (13.9)	44.6 (7.0)	33.4 (0.8)	53.6 (12.0)
Daily mean °F (°C)	18.0 (−7.8)	20.1 (−6.6)	29.5 (−1.4)	41.2 (5.1)	52.9 (11.6)	62.1 (16.7)	68.0 (20.0)	67.0 (19.4)	59.4 (15.2)	47.4 (8.6)	36.6 (2.6)	25.8 (−3.4)	44.0 (6.7)
Mean daily minimum °F (°C)	8.8 (−12.9)	10.4 (−12.0)	20.3 (−6.5)	31.7 (−0.2)	42.3 (5.7)	51.8 (11.0)	57.7 (14.3)	56.4 (13.6)	48.8 (9.3)	37.7 (3.2)	28.5 (−1.9)	18.2 (−7.7)	34.4 (1.3)
Mean minimum °F (°C)	−11.0 (−23.9)	−9.8 (−23.2)	−2.5 (−19.2)	18.0 (−7.8)	28.5 (−1.9)	37.9 (3.3)	46.4 (8.0)	42.9 (6.1)	33.9 (1.1)	24.3 (−4.3)	12.2 (−11.0)	−1.5 (−18.6)	−13.5 (−25.3)
Record low °F (°C)	−28 (−33)	−32 (−36)	−22 (−30)	3 (−16)	20 (−7)	25 (−4)	35 (2)	33 (1)	22 (−6)	14 (−10)	−6 (−21)	−27 (−33)	−32 (−36)
Average precipitation inches (mm)	3.77 (96)	3.28 (83)	3.98 (101)	3.63 (92)	3.33 (85)	3.67 (93)	3.29 (84)	2.77 (70)	3.54 (90)	5.05 (128)	4.41 (112)	4.93 (125)	45.65 (1,160)
Average snowfall inches (cm)	17.8 (45)	19.9 (51)	13.4 (34)	3.5 (8.9)	0.2 (0.51)	0.0 (0.0)	0.0 (0.0)	0.0 (0.0)	0.0 (0.0)	0.1 (0.25)	2.7 (6.9)	16.6 (42)	74.2 (188)
Average precipitation days (≥ 0.01 in)	10.9	10.0	11.0	11.3	11.4	11.5	10.8	8.5	9.4	10.7	11.1	12.3	128.9
Average snowy days (≥ 0.1 in)	6.5	6.3	4.5	1.6	0.0	0.0	0.0	0.0	0.0	0.1	1.7	5.1	25.8
Source: NOAA

== Demographics ==
Historical population
Census	Pop.	Note	%±
1880	345		—
1890	404		17.1%
1900	221		−45.3%
1910	290		31.2%
1920	231		−20.3%
1930	240		3.9%
1940	216		−10.0%
1950	294		36.1%
1960	219		−25.5%
1970	186		−15.1%
1980	198		6.5%
1990	174		−12.1%
2000	150		−13.8%
2010	109		−27.3%
2020	125		14.7%

As of the census of 2000, there were 150 people, 76 households, and 49 families residing in the plantation. The population density was 3.4 inhabitants per square mile (1.3/km^{2}). There were 243 housing units at an average density of 5.5 per square mile (2.1/km^{2}). The racial makeup of the plantation was 96.00% White, 1.33% Native American, 0.67% Asian, and 2.00% from two or more races. Hispanic or Latino of any race were 0.67% of the population. The local Native American community is part of the Passamaquoddy people.

There were 76 households, out of which 14.5% had children under the age of 18 living with them, 56.6% were married couples living together, 6.6% had a female householder with no husband present, and 35.5% were non-families. 31.6% of all households were made up of individuals, and 17.1% had someone living alone who was 65 years of age or older. The average household size was 1.97 and the average family size was 2.43.

In the plantation the population was spread out, with 10.7% under the age of 18, 5.3% from 18 to 24, 16.7% from 25 to 44, 45.3% from 45 to 64, and 22.0% who were 65 years of age or older. The median age was 50 years. For every 100 females, there were 97.4 males. For every 100 females age 18 and over, there were 94.2 males.

The median income for a household in the plantation was $28,750, and the median income for a family was $28,750. Males had a median income of $34,375 versus $23,333 for females. The per capita income for the plantation was $17,502. There were 25.0% of families and 24.4% of the population living below the poverty line, including 34.5% of under eighteens and 9.4% of those over 64.

== Notable person ==
- Buffalo Bob Smith, host of Howdy Doody
