= Ed Alberian =

American actor (1920–1997)

- Born: Edward Haig Alberian; January 21, 1920; New York, United States
- Died: March 31, 1997 (aged 77)
- Education: New York University, Columbia University, Juilliard School
- Occupation: Actor

Edwin Haig Alberian (January 21, 1920 – March 31, 1997) was an American stage and television actor and entertainer who began his career in off-Broadway and Broadway productions, and moved into the nascent television industry, where his work was oriented to children's programming and clowning.

== Career ==
Alberian played the Clarabell the Clown for public appearances and on the television show Howdy Doody appeared as Professor Gusbags, as well other characters such as Doaky the Clown, on Let's Have Fun and The Beachcomber Bill Show. Alberian was frequently asked to do the original live performances of animated or promotional characters. Projects in which he worked include appearances as Bozo and in The Banana Splits. He was also the side-kick and chaperone, Sir Clacky Wack, to Sunbeam Bakeries mascot Little Miss Sunbeam. In these numerous roles he often played master of ceremonies at variety shows and fundraisers and was introduced to many prominent figures, including President Truman. In 1958, he copyrighted the persona of Dokey the Clown, which developed through his career. On a private trip to Armenia he was seen entertaining local children and, in 1988, after some years of semi-retirement, was invited to Soviet Armenia to promote cultural exchange.

== Education and personal life ==
Alberian was born Edwin Haig Alberian in New York on January 21, 1920. Alberian was of Armenian descent, his family having arrived in the United States as part of the Armenian diaspora. He attended New York University and Columbia University, where he studied science and chemistry and received a degree in perfumery. He later graduated from Juilliard School and chose a career as performer.

He married and lived in Weehawken, New Jersey with his wife Marie (née Hekimian) with whom he had two children. Alberian died March 31, 1997 and is buried at Flower Hill Cemetery, North Bergen.
