= Checking Out (2005 film) =

- Theatrical release poster
- Directed by: Jeff Hare
- Screenplay by: Richard Marcus
- Based on: Checking Out by Allen Swift
- Produced by: Jon Karas
- Starring: Peter Falk; Laura San Giacomo; David Paymer; Judge Reinhold
- Cinematography: Matthew Jensen
- Edited by: Edward R. Abroms
- Music by: Nicholas Pike
- Production companies: Full Circle Studios; Fully Attired Film Group LLC
- Distributed by: FilmWorks Entertainment
- Release dates: April 10, 2005 (Phoenix Film Festival); December 19, 2006 (United States)
- Running time: 94 minutes
- Country: United States
- Language: English

Checking Out is a 2005 American comedy film directed by Jeff Hare and written by Richard Marcus, based on the play of the same name by Allen Swift. It stars Peter Falk, Laura San Giacomo, David Paymer and Judge Reinhold.

== Plot ==
Morris Applebaum, an eccentric, celebrated stage actor of Jewish origin summons by letters his three adult children to his Manhattan apartment for the celebration of his 90th birthday and a special event they'll never forget; when the party's over, Morris plans to take his "final exit". He is healthy and not unduly depressed although he's missing his wife, but he just wants to go out the way he's lived, on his own terms and as a performance. Now it's up to his hilarious offspring – Flo, Ted, Barry and his daughter-in-law and her teen son and daughter – to put aside their own excessive baggage from childhood and convince Morris that he touched many people and changed their lives. But Morris escapes from his apartment by hiring a taxi cab and, assisted by the NYC geriatric psychiatrists Dr. Sheldon Henning, the adventure begins.

== Сast ==
- Peter Falk as Morris Applebaum
- Laura San Giacomo as Flo Applebaum
- David Paymer as Ted Applebaum
- Judge Reinhold as Barry Applebaum
- Jeffrey D. Sams as Dr. Sheldon Henning
- Shera Danese as Rhonda Applebaum
- Mary Elizabeth Winstead as Lisa Applebaum
- Dan Byrd as Jason Applebaum
- Tony Todd as Manuel
- Alex Datcher as Raphaella
- David Bowe as Allen
- Bob Bancroft as Foyt
- Luis Antonio Ramos as Luis
- Galen Yuen as Foreman
- Joey Gray as Dan
- Anthony Giangrande as Aaron
- Philippe Bergeron as Driver
- Jordana Capra as Woman Customer
- Megahn Perry as Sitcom Woman
- Michael Bavone as Nurse
- Jasmine Jessica Anthony as Young Flo Applebaum (uncredited)
- Tara Lynne Barr as Ballet Student (uncredited)
- Gavin MacLeod as Doorman (uncredited)

== Reception ==
On review aggregator Rotten Tomatoes, the film holds a rating of 38%, based on 8 reviews. On Metacritic, the film has a weighted average score of 44 out of 100, based on 5 critics, indicating "mixed or average" reviews.
