= Edward Kean =

American writer

Edward George Kean
- Born: October 28, 1924; Manhattan, New York, United States
- Died: August 13, 2010 (aged 85); West Bloomfield Township, Michigan, US
- Education: Columbia University
- Occupation(s): Television producer, screenwriter
- Spouse: Vivian Kean
- Children: 1 son, 1 daughter (deceased)

Edward George Kean (October 28, 1924 – August 13, 2010) was an American television pioneer and writer who helped create The Howdy Doody Show and wrote over 2,000 episodes of the program.

== Early years ==
Kean was born in 1924 in Manhattan. As a child, he started writing songs while at summer camp. Kean served in the United States Navy during World War II. He was based at Cornell University through the V-12 Navy College Training Program and earned a degree from Columbia University.

== Howdy Doody ==
A song he wrote when he was in his 20s attracted the interest of Buffalo Bob Smith, then hosting a radio show, and Smith hired Kean as a writer. When Smith was invited by NBC in 1947 to create a television program for children, he came along to create "something that will keep the small fry intently absorbed, and out of possible mischief, for an hour" as he told Variety.

The show debuted as Puppet Playhouse on December 27, 1947, as a Saturday morning program and was aired as a half-hour program five days each week at 5:30 PM from 1948 through 1956 on 200 television stations nationwide.

Stephen Davis, a historian who wrote the 1987 book, Say Kids! What Time Is It?, which chronicled the history of The Howdy Doody Show, credited Kean with writing the show's theme song as the program's "chief writer, philosopher and theoretician". In his eight years with the show, he scripted "almost every line spoken and every note sung", created characters such as Clarabell the Clown and Princess Summerfall Winterspring, and conceived of Howdy Doody's 1948 run for President of the United States. Kean coined the word "kawabonga" as a greeting for the character Chief Thunderthud, which was later adopted by surfers as "cowabunga" and popularized by Snoopy, the Teenage Mutant Ninja Turtles and Bart Simpson among others.

== Later years ==
Kean left the show in 1955 and went to work in the public relations field and as a stockbroker along with writing a newspaper column called The Consumer Madvocate for a number of years. He was also a lounge pianist in Detroit and Miami. Kean had previously scripted many of the Doody Dell comic books and children books and did further work for Dell (comics and books, both non-Doody) after leaving the show.

A resident of West Bloomfield Township, Michigan, Kean died at age 85 on 13 August 2010, at a health care facility there due to emphysema. He was survived by his wife, Vivian, as well as by a son, a stepdaughter, a stepson and seven grandchildren.
