= The Brian Benben Show =

American sitcom television series

- Genre: Sitcom
- Created by: Robert Borden
- Directed by: Andrew D. Weyman
- Starring: Brian Benben; Susan Blommaert; Charles Esten; Wendell Pierce; Luis Antonio Ramos; Lisa Thornhill; Lisa Vidal
- Composer: Mark Heyes
- Country of origin: United States
- Original language: English
- No. of seasons: 1
- No. of episodes: 9 (5 unaired)

Production
- Executive producers: Robert Borden; Brian Benben; Jace Richdale
- Running time: 30 minutes
- Production companies: CBS Productions; Warner Bros. Television

Original release
- Network: CBS
- Release: September 21 – October 12, 1998

The Brian Benben Show is an American sitcom television series that aired on CBS on Mondays from September 21, 1998 to October 12, 1998. The show rated poorly and was dropped after 4 of the 9 episodes made were aired. It has never been released on any home media or streaming format.

== Premise ==
The show centered on Brian Benben, an anchor on KYLA-TV news in Los Angeles, who was replaced in favor of a younger person. Brian was later able to return to the station as a replacement for a human interest reporter who was killed covering an ape exhibit at a zoo.

== Cast ==
- Brian Benben as Brian Benben
- Susan Blommaert as Beverly Shippel
- Charles Esten as Chad Rockwell
- Wendell Pierce as Kevin La Rue
- Luis Antonio Ramos as Billy Hernandez
- Lisa Thornhill as Tabitha Berkeley
- Lisa Vidal as Julie

== Episodes ==
List of The Brian Benben Show episodes
No.	Title	Directed by	Written by	Original release date	Prod. code	US viewers (millions)
1	"Pilot"	Andrew D. Weyman	Robert Borden	September 21, 1998	475142	10.57
2	"House of Blues"	Andrew D. Weyman	John Frink & Don Payne	September 28, 1998	467251	9.39
3	"Brian's Got Back: Part 1"	Andrew D. Weyman	Alex Reid	October 5, 1998	467254	9.31
4	"Brian's Got Back: Part 2"	Andrew D. Weyman	Betsy Borns	October 12, 1998	467255	9.27
5	"Of Mice and Benben"	Andrew D. Weyman	Maggie Bandur & Pang-Ni Landrum	Unaired	467256	N/A
6	"Chad Dates Julie"	Andrew D. Weyman	Jace Richdale	Unaired	467253	N/A
7	"Have One for the Show"	Andrew D. Weyman	Gail Lerner	Unaired	467257	N/A
8	"Billy, Don't Be a Hero"	Andrew D. Weyman	Bobby Bowman	Unaired	467258	N/A
9	"Motivating Kevin"	Andrew D. Weyman	Robert Borden	Unaired	467252	N/A
