= TJ Fisher =

American author

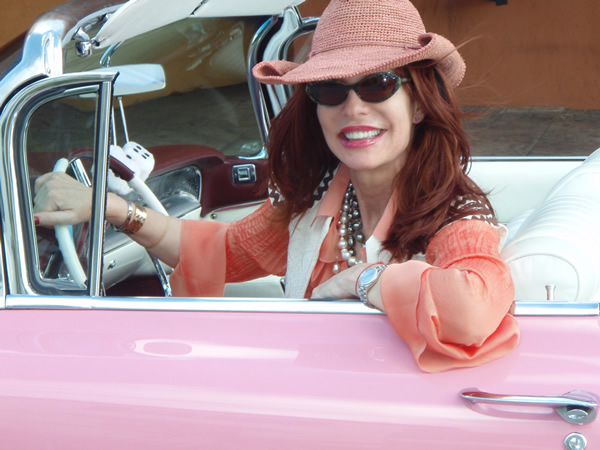
- Occupation: Author
- Website: www.tjfisher.com

TJ Fisher is an American Southern author, documentarist and social critic. She resides in New Orleans, Louisiana; and Palm Beach, Florida.

== Career ==
Prior to being an author, Fisher worked as a journalist, gossip columnist, documentary filmmaker and advertising agency/public relations executive. As an author and poet, Fisher's works have focused on New Orleans and the historic French Quarter (Vieux Carré).

After Hurricane Katrina, in late 2005 Fisher authored the narrative Orléans Embrace, for which she received praise for her prose. Orléans Embrace is a three-part compendium: the first and third parts are by Fisher, and the middle part is the companion book The Secret Gardens of the Vieux Carré by Roy F. Guste, Jr. with photography by Louis Sahuc. She was not paid for her work on the (post-Katrina) French Quarter fundraising book A Crusade for New Orleans.

Fisher received awards for Best New Voice Nonfiction and The Bill Fisher Award for Best First Book Nonfiction for Orléans Embrace with The Secret Gardens of the Vieux Carré at the PMA Publishers Marketing Association Benjamin Franklin Awards in 2007. At the Independent Publisher Book Awards it received a gold medal in the Home & Garden category. The title also won the Best Books 2007 Awards in the Home: General category.

She was nominated for a Southern Independent Booksellers Alliance SIBA Book Award for her poetry in Hearsay from Heaven and Hades: New Orleans Secrets of Sinners and Saints. The title won the Best Books 2009 Awards Poetry: General category.

Beyond personal experience, her first post-Katrina work "imprinted a style reminiscent of Lafcadio Hearn". Gris Gris Rouge, a periodical in Louisiana, wrote that Fisher's narratives celebrate and capture the elusive quality of New Orleans.

== Real estate and controversy ==
In the late 1990s, Fisher was one of the original owner/developers of the Ritz-Carlton Coconut Grove, Miami, Florida; she was also associated with the South Beach and Baltimore Ritz projects.

On several joint-venture projects Fisher aligned with Philip Pilevsky of Philips International, the on-off financier/partner of hotelier Ian Schrager. The Schrager/Philip pairing began with Studio 54. Later, in conjunction with designer Philip Stark, they founded original boutique hotels, including New York City's Paramount Hotel and Royalton Hotel, Miami's Delano Hotel and Shore Club, and Los Angeles's Mondrian Hotel.

In 2007 former football player Michael McCrary added Fisher to a lawsuit against her husband and others for $60 million. The Circuit Court for Baltimore City civil litigation concerned a hurricane-derailed New Orleans real estate venture at the New Orleans landmark (Crescent City Towers) Plaza Tower site. McCrary's case targeted a tangle of Louisiana limited liability companies. The soured real estate and development investment deal netted McCrary and a web of partnerships millions of dollars in post-Katrina profits within a few months. McCrary reaped $2,384,639 in profits and the return of his $3,550,000 capital investment. In June 2008, a judge in Baltimore rendered a $33.3 million default judgment against Fisher and others, in favor of McCrary. Preceding the award, defendants and their attorneys were precluded from speaking or participating in the damages hearing inquisition. Legal analysts cited U.S. Constitution and due process violations. Fisher was unable to post a $33.3 million supersedeas bond to stay execution of the judgment against her during the pendency of the appeal. Nearly a year after the decision, the Maryland Court of Special Appeals granted a stay against the judgment without a bond being posted. In June 2009, the Maryland intermediate appellate court tossed the $33.3-million-dollar award.

In earlier Pre-Katrina litigation on eminent domain site expropriation by the New Orleans Morial Convention Center, Fisher retained Johnnie Cochran to represent herself and a partner. On a separate but nearby parcel of property, Fisher turned over her winning-bid auction contract on a multimillion-dollar Mississippi River riverfront ex-casino property to Tulane University, at no profit, for future development of the Riversphere project. The former River Gate Casino tract was previously associated with hotelier/developer/dreamer Christopher Hemmeter and Louisiana ex-governor Edwin Edwards.

== Personal life ==
Fisher and her husband Neil Fisher helped found the Rufus Fisher Dog Angel program at Kansas State University College of Veterinary Medicine, a program established in memory of their late yellow Labrador retriever.

Fisher possesses one of the three original 1940s Howdy Doody marionettes, Photo Doody.
