= The Bluffers =

Dutch television cartoon series

- Genre: Cartoon series
- Created by: Gene Deitch (original idea); Frank Fehmers (concept)
- Directed by: Frank Fehmers
- Voices of: Allen Swift; Kees ter Bruggen; Richard Felgate; Gene Deitch; Eric Jan Harmsen
- Narrated by: Gene Deitch
- Theme music composer: Eric Jan Harmsen
- Countries of origin: Netherlands; United States
- Original languages: Dutch; English
- No. of seasons: 1
- No. of episodes: 13

Production
- Executive producer: Frank Fehmers
- Producer: Frank Fehmers
- Running time: 25 minutes

Original release
- Network: AVRO
- Release: 7 October – 30 December 1986

The Bluffers is a 1986 children's cartoon series created by Frank Fehmers. The stories revolved around the inhabitants of the fictitious land of Bluffoonia and their ongoing struggle against the evil tyrant Clandestino and his plans to destroy the forest in which they live.

The series was based on an idea by Gene Deitch, who also wrote the lyrics. Michael Jupp, who also created The Dreamstone and Bimble's Bucket, was art director for the series and created the characters.

The show's opening strapline is:

Bluffoonia once was a beautiful country before the crazed maniac Clandestino took over. Clandestino turned that beautiful place into this. Why? Because Clandestino is afraid the Bluffers will get his secret — the secret of getting it all!

== Characters ==
=== Heroes ===
- Zok (short for Zocrates), a wise old owl wearing a toga and a laurel wreath. Zok is a fatherly figure and advisor to the Bluffers (i.e., the animal denizens of the last remaining forest in Bluffoonia), and the keeper of the encyclopedic Book of All Knowledge. His name is a take-off of Socrates (hence his Roman Emperor appearance).
- Zip, a fast-running blue squirrel with a love of adventure; he's led a number of raids into Clandestino's castle. When Zip is not leading a raid on the castle he is often found in some activity involving nuts.
- Blossom, a pink mouse with a head of red hair. She has romantic feelings for Zip but he is reluctant to return them.
- Honey Boy, a simple-minded brown bear with a strong passion for anything to do with honey, and whose pet bees are always flying around his head.
- Sharpy, a red, bipedal fox who likes to outwit others for his own gain. He feels that lying, cheating, and stealing are what "real foxes" do, although he tends not to do these very successfully.
- Regal Eagle, an eagle who talks and thinks like a soldier. This character is the least featured of the Bluffers and is often only called upon to perform a small task in any plans the animals may have.
- Gin-Seng, a goose with an Oriental appearance about her who specializes in brewing herbal remedies. She is named after the plant ginseng.
- Prickly Pine, a hyperactive, red-quilled porcupine who is always ready for action and combat. He is able to project his quills with pinpoint accuracy, although this inexhaustible supply of quills often end up in the rump of Sharpy or some other unsuspecting Bluffer.
- Psycho, a shy, reclusive snake with limited psychic powers; e.g., he was once used as a metal detector. When speaking he adds an audible "P" to words that contain an "S" sound; "p'sad," "p'certainly," et cetera.

=== Villains ===
- Clandestino, a bloated, self-adoring, hunchbacked human; he is the self-appointed totalitarian ruler of Bluffoonia. He lives in a fortress-like castle, the dungeon of which contains his precious "Secret of Getting It All" which is the source of his power.
- Sillycone, Clandestino's robot butler; he is smarter than his master and seems to possess no malice, but he serves Clandestino faithfully. His name is based upon Silicon (the element most transistors and integrated circuits are made out of) and Silly.

=== Other characters ===
- Glum, Clandestino's watchdog; his sympathies lie with the Bluffers, but he doesn't dare to openly rebel against his master because he doesn't want to lose his home in the castle.
- Song and Dance, two rabbits — one tall and thin, one short and fat — who are often wearing sunglasses. They are sometimes seen conducting the musical segments, but are not integral to the stories.

== Episode list ==
01. Memory Forever - Clandestino builds a memorial gallery of his greatness as Zip and Sharpy hope to get Clandestino’s secret.

02. The Present of Time - Time stops on the 29th night of February.

03. Things That Go Bluff in the Night

04. Where on Earth Are We?

05. Digging Archaeology

06. Satellite State

07. Is Friendship Sinking?

08. Down With Gravity

09. Colour Mix-up - Zip infiltrates Clandestino’s Castle to get some paint for Honeyboy.

10. Follow the Bio-Brick Road

11. Evolution Isn't What it Used to Be

12. Over Bluffoonia in My Balloonia

13. Minerology

== Format ==
Each episode is approximately 25 minutes long. Most of the stories are centered on Clandestino doing or plotting something that will either destroy Bluffoonia's last forest or otherwise disrupt the Bluffers' lives, and the Bluffers' attempts to thwart him. Some of the stories are centered on the Bluffers' plans to steal Clandestino's "Secret of Getting It All" so they can use it to remove him from power. This secret, which plays a major part in most episodes, is never successfully stolen or even revealed throughout the series. The closest of it seen is the door to the secret, locked and vaulted with chains, a skull and stylish lights around its frame. Only Clandestino is allowed to see it, and if anyone tries and dares, even by his servants, are to be killed. That's why he always carries to keys to the locks of the door. In the final episode of the entire series, whilst digging his courtyard with his machines for minerals, ended up disrupting the moat, thus causing the entire castle to be flooded, and the lower parts sunk, taking the secret with it, despite his futile attempts of rescuing it.

Each episode contains two musical numbers.

== Availability ==
In the late 1980s, the series was released on VHS videocassettes in the United States (by Celebrity Home Entertainment's "Just For Kids" label) and most European countries, each containing one or more episodes. There was also a videocassette of collected musical numbers from the series.
