= List of Underdog characters =

Underdog, also known as The Underdog Show, is an American Saturday morning animated television series that ran from October 3, 1964, to March 4, 1967. The show went into syndication starting in 1969. Underdog, Shoeshine Boy's heroic alter ego, appears whenever Sweet Polly Purebred is being victimized by such villains as Simon Bar Sinister or Riff Raff.

== Underdog ==
Underdog
- First appearance: Safe Waif (1964)
- Voiced by: Wally Cox

In-universe information
- Species: Dog
- Gender: Male

Underdog is an anthropomorphic dog, a parody of Superman and similar superheroes with secret identities. The premise is that "humble and lovable" Shoeshine Boy, a cartoon dog, is in truth the superhero Underdog. When villains threatened, Shoeshine Boy ducks into a telephone booth, where he transforms into the caped and costumed hero, destroying the booth in the process when his superpowers are activated. In the 2007 live-action film, he appears as a beagle who becomes Jack Unger's pet. In 2008, he appeared in a Super Bowl advertisement for Coca-Cola.

As Shoeshine Boy, or "Shoeshine" for short, he talks in a regular way, but as Underdog, he speaks in rhyme, such as when he delivers his catchphrase, "When Polly's in trouble, I am not slow; it's hip-hip-hip and away I go!" In his civilian identity, he wears spectacles, a red vest, and a red and yellow baseball cap. His Underdog uniform consists of a loose-fitting red jumpsuit with a white "U" on the chest, red boots, and a blue cape that is rather too long and tends to drag on the ground.

Underdog is voiced by Wally Cox in the original series. In the film adaptation, he is voiced by Jason Lee and portrayed onscreen by a lemon beagle named Leo sporting a red sweater and a blue cape. In the animatronic segments for the Bullwinkle's Restaurant chain, Bill Scott voiced Underdog. In a 1995 Frosted Cheerios commercial, Underdog was voiced by Billy West. In a 2005 Visa commercial, he is voiced by Jeff Bergman.

== Allies ==
=== Sweet Polly Purebred ===
Sweet Polly Purebred
- First appearance: March of the Monsters (1964)
- Voiced by: Norma MacMillan

In-universe information
- Species: Dog
- Gender: Female

Sweet Polly Purebred is a dog reporter and Underdog's love interest; she serves as the damsel in distress of most episodes. When being pursued by an antagonist, Polly is apt to start singing, "Oh where, oh where has my Underdog gone? Oh where, oh where has he gone?", in a plaintive voice, hoping for the object of her affections to come and rescue her. Polly's face is slightly similar to that of Underdog's, with a large muzzle and nose; she wears her hair styled in a pageboy.

In the live-action film, Polly is a Cavalier King Charles Spaniel owned by a girl named Molly, a classmate of Underdog/Shoeshine's owner, Jack. She is based upon Superman's romantic interest Lois Lane.

In the 1976 Western Comics Underdog #7, it is revealed that Polly has a young nephew named Wilbur.

She has been voiced in animated form by Norma MacMillan, and in the live-action film by Amy Adams.

=== Dan Unger ===
Dan Unger (portrayed by Jim Belushi) is a former police officer who quit the force after his wife died. He later became a security guard at a scientific institute where Simon Bar Sinister hid out after hours. Using Underdog's stolen collar, Simon and Cad determine where he lives and captures him to lure Jack and Underdog to them. After Underdog frees the Mayor, Dan is reinstated into the police.

=== General Brainley ===
General Brainley (voiced by Allen Swift) is in charge of the moon launch at Cape Canaveral. When he is about to send a pair of astronauts and Polly to the moon, Simon Bar Sinister and Cad Lackey hijack the spaceship and hold Polly prisoner to use the weather machine against Earth.

=== Jack Unger ===
Jack Unger (portrayed by Alex Neuberger) is Underdog's human companion in the film. He is a teenager and Dan Unger's son. His mother has died some time ago. Although Dan is very understanding, Jack's relationship with him is not very smooth. When Dan brings him the dog Shoeshine which he found in the street, Jack at first does not want him. When the dog talks to him, he is understandably upset and wonders whether he is going crazy. However, soon he decides he wants to keep him.

=== O.J. Skweez ===
O.J. Skweez (voiced by Mort Marshall) is the owner of the TTV (Total Television) building and is Polly's employer.

=== Professor Moby Von Ahab ===
Professor Moby Von Ahab (voiced by Allen Swift) is one of the world's leading scientists who helped Polly investigate what was happening beneath the sea when the Bubblehead Empire planned to conquer the surface world. Ahab is named for Moby-Dick and Captain Ahab.

=== Officer Flim Flanigan ===
Appearances: A New Villain, Batty-Man

Officer Flim Flanigan previously appeared frequently on the King Leonardo and His Short Subjects segment "The Hunter". He was included as the chief of police during later episodes.

== Villains ==
=== Simon Bar Sinister ===
Simon Bar Sinister (voiced by Allen Swift in the series; portrayed by Peter Dinklage in the film) is a mad scientist. He is the wickedest man in the world, precedes all his commands with "Simon Says", and has an assistant named Cad Lackey. It is Simon Bar Sinister's ambition to rule the world, but, each time, Underdog defeats him. Sinister is named for a bend sinister, a diagonal line in heraldry that can indicate that the bearer is a bastard by birth and is sometimes erroneously called a bar sinister.

=== Cad Lackey ===
Cad Lackey (voiced by Ben Stone in the series; portrayed by Patrick Warburton in the film) is Sinister's henchman. Though generally dull-witted, he is able to point out flaws in his boss's plans. Contrary to the mad scientist stereotype, Sinister actually pays attention to Lackey's suggestions in these episodes.

In the live-action film, Lackey is portrayed as more intelligent and level-headed. He is Sinister's partner and the security guard of a building where Sinister hides out after hours.

=== Riff Raff ===
Riff Raff (voiced by Allen Swift in the series; Brad Garrett in the film) is an anthropomorphic wolf gangster. He leads an unnamed gang that often carry out various crime waves until they are stopped by Underdog.

In the film, Riff Raff is a non-anthropomorphic Rottweiler. When he meets Shoeshine, he and his dog henchmen chase him around an alley in an attempt to eat him until he is found by Dan Unger, when they run away. They meet again with Polly on the sidewalk. Around the end of the film, Shoeshine barks at Riff Raff enough to remove some of his fur and he and his henchmen run away. In contrast to his role as a major villain on the series, Riff Raff is portrayed as more of a comic relief minor villain.

=== Riff Raff's gang ===
==== Dinah Mite ====
Dinah Mite is one of the criminals Riff Raff summoned in the episode "Whistler's Father". She is the best bomb-tosser in the crime business.

==== Mooch ====
Mooch (voiced by George S. Irving) is the top gunman in Riff Raff's gang and Riff Raff's right-hand man.

==== Nails the Carpenter ====
Nails is a carpenter and one of the new members of Riff Raff's gang. He rebuilt the sunken ship of Captain Kidd as part of Riff Raff's ghost ship plot.

==== Needles the Tailor ====
Needles is a tailor and one of the new members of Riff Raff's gang. He sewed a sail as part of Riff Raff's ghost ship plot.

==== Sandy the Safecracker ====
Sandy is a safecracker who is skilled in breaking into banks. He just opens safes with his fingers.

==== Smitty the Blacksmith ====
Smitty (voiced by George S. Irving) is a blacksmith and member of Riff Raff's gang. He hammered out an anchor as part of Riff Raff's ghost ship plot.

==== Spinny Wheels ====
Spinny Wheels is the best getaway car driver in the crime business.

==== Witch Doctor ====
The Witch Doctor (voiced by George S. Irving) is one of the new members of Riff Raff's gang. He was the disguised prisoner who went with Riff Raff during the prison break. When Polly is captured during her infiltration, Riff Raff reveals the disguised prisoner to be the Witch Doctor. When Underdog arrives, the Witch Doctor puts Underdog under a voodoo spell, which is instantly broken by Underdog's Super Energy Pill.

=== Other villains ===
==== Batty-Man ====
Batty-Man (voiced by Allen Swift) is a vampire villain who commands a massive army of giant bats and lives in Belfrey Castle.

In "Batty-Man", he and his batty army cause a crime wave nationwide, baffling everyone in the country. The crime wave was arranged to make Underdog powerless enough so Batty-Man could not be stopped from pulling the crime of the century. Soon, Underdog learns that Batty-Man was the crook behind the crime wave after Polly is taken captive. Underdog attempts to rescue Polly, only to be captured by Batty-Man. Underdog and Polly escape before they can get turned into bowling balls and defeat Batty-Man.

Batty-Man appears in the Spotlight Comics series Underdog, where he falls in love with Polly and attempts to woo her. Polly did not return his feelings, prompting Batty-Man to take her down to the catacombs. Underdog hears Polly's cries for help and goes to rescue her. After Polly is rescued, Batty-Man said to her that "their love was never meant to be."

===== Georgie =====
Georgie (voiced by George S. Irving) is Batty-Man's assistant.

==== The Bubblehead Empire ====
The Bubblehead Empire is a society of people who all wear air helmets and live under the sea, in the city of Maldemare (the name being a take-off on the French phrase mal de mer, meaning “seasickness”). They command sea creatures to do their bidding and deal with their prisoners by feeding them to a giant clam. The city is ruled by the Bubblehead Emperor, who in turn was ruled by the Bubblehead Empress.

==== Irving and Ralph ====
Irving and Ralph are a two-headed dragon known as the legendary enemies of the planet Zot. For every task they do, they do it with teamwork as noted by the quote "Teamwork! Teamwork! That's what counts!". When they attacked while Underdog was to forcibly wed Glissando, Princess of Zot, Underdog easily defeated them and they promised never to bother Zot's inhabitants again. Upon their defeat, Underdog was allowed to return home to Earth, knowing that he had helped Glissando find her future husband: Zot's Prime Minister.

==== The Magnet Men ====
The Magnet Men are evil robotic aliens who feed on metal. They demand that the Earth give them all of its metal. After their demands are not met, the Magnet Men use their Great Gravity Gun to pull the Earth towards them. As the Earth moves away from the Sun, the planet plunges into a deep freeze. Underdog defeats the Magnet Men, destroys the Great Gravity Gun, and puts the Earth back in its correct position in space.

==== The Marbleheads ====
The Marbleheads are people made of marble. Captain Marblehead (voiced by Allen Swift) is the dictator of their planet. Captain Marblehead holds their most powerful weapon, the Granite Gun, that can turn anyone into solid stone. He uses it on Underdog, but to Marblehead's shock, he breaks free. Underdog defeats the Marbleheads and the Granite Gun and frees all the slaves.

==== The Molemen ====
The Molemen are an evil society of giant moles who live underground, led by King Mange (voiced by Allen Swift). They plan to conquer the world by stealing all the food in the world, thus making everyone weak, sluggish and without energy. With this advantage, the Molemen and their giant ants would have no problem conquering the world. Other giant bugs under the Molemens' ownership include a giant caterpillar who encases Underdog and Polly in a cocoon, and a giant spider who attempts to trap them in a web.

As Polly is investigating the thefts, she is captured by King Mange. Underdog is called to rescue her, but is incapacitated by the Mole-Hole Gun, the Molemen's secret weapon. Underdog gets Polly free and soon comes up with the answer to everyone's energy problems. He filled every water reservoir in the world with his Super Energy Pills, investing the water with tremendous energy. Soon afterward, the citizens have enough energy to escape the Molemen's attack. King Mange is eventually defeated and arrested.

==== Overcat ====
Overcat (voiced by Allen Swift) is a giant anthropomorphic cat who was once the infamous ruler of the planet Felina. He is an arrogant bully and also has all of Underdog's powers.

After the milk wells on Felina run dry, Overcat steals cows from Earth, kidnaps Polly, and forces her to milk the cows so the giant cats of Felina can have a lifetime supply of milk. After Underdog rescues Polly and the cows, Overcat challenges Underdog to a winner-take-all fight. Unless Underdog fights Overcat, the giant cats of Felina will destroy the Earth. As Underdog battles Overcat, it appears Overcat has the upper-hand, but Overcat's size and lack of speed allow Underdog to come out the victor. Overcat is banished from Felina in exchange for the other cats being given coconut trees to get milk from.

==== Slippery Eel (a.k.a. The Electric Eel) ====
Slippery Eel is one of the world's most dangerous criminals. He gained electrical abilities after being electrocuted while attempting to escape prison; as a result, he is also known as the Electric Eel.

Electric Eel was the only villain who ever actually defeated Underdog, using his electrical powers and apparently killing Underdog. However, before he "died", Underdog requests that he not be thrown into the lake. Eel, being the villain that he was, decides to throw Underdog into the lake, which drains the electricity from Underdog's body and restores him to "life", whereupon he polishes off Eel and his gang.

==== Tap Tap the Chiseler ====
Tap Tap the Chiseler (voiced by George S. Irving) is a criminal who chisels jewelry, making them into smaller pieces of jewelry. He bears an uncanny amazing resemblance to Underdog, and Tap Tap can use this advantage to impersonate Underdog. However, unlike Underdog, he does not speak in rhyme. He also seems to be close friends with Riff Raff.

==== Wicked Witch of Pickyoon ====
The Wicked Witch of Pickyoon is an evil witch who rules over the strange land of the Pickyoons and has enslaved all who inhabit the land. She lives in a castle in the mountains of Pickyoon.

The Wicked Witch places a spell on Polly, causing her to fall asleep for 1,000 years. The Witch is the only one who knew how to break the spell. In exchange for being told the cure, Underdog agrees to assist the Witch in her endeavors. Underdog complies with the Witch and retrieves water and diamonds for her. When he refuses to conquer Earth for her, Underdog gets into a fight with the Witch, causing her to vanish after destroying her broom. Afterwards, Underdog awakens Polly with a kiss and the people of Pickyoon are freed from the Witch's power.

==== Zorm ====
Zorm is the ruler of a strange planet. He planned to take over the world, but in order to do that, he must keep Underdog from interfering. He sends Cron to Earth. Cron places a charm around Underdog's neck that causes him to fall under his dizzy spell when standing up. But when Underdog sits down, he feels perfectly fine. Underdog eventually gets the charm off and foils Zorm's plan.

===== Cron =====
Cron is Zorm's henchman.

=== Reformed villains ===
The following villains gave up their evil plans after being thwarted by Underdog:

==== The Cloud Men ====
The Cloud Men are a race of ghost-like creatures. They live on the Planet Cumulus and are led by King Cumulus Regulus (voiced by Allen Swift). When humans "interfere with them", the Cloud Men lightning jolt them by shooting out electric bolts from their fingers that turn them into living statues. They steal all the silver on Earth, including Underdog's ring, because everything they had was made of gold and "every Cloud Man must have a silver lining". When Underdog and Polly head for a conveyor belt, Underdog finds his ring and took his Super Energy Pill, then defeats the Cloud Men. In the end, the Cloud Men trade gold for silver with the Earth.

==== The Flying Sorcerers ====
The Flying Sorcerers are an alien species led by King Cup (voiced by Allen Swift).

Cup sends his twin sons Bric and Brac to find someone who can bake a cake for his people after the old royal baker was fired for his cake not being good. The first two baking slaves they found upon King Cup firing a dart at three possible planets were a Magnet Man and an inhabitant of Zot, but they could not bake a cake that tasted like cake (the Magnet Man's cake was made of metal and the Zot Man's cake's texture was gummy and sticky) and were imprisoned. Bric and Brac enslave Polly for their ends. Before Underdog can rescue her, Bric and Brac transform him into a bouncing ball. Polly is forced to bake 500 cakes for the Flying Sorcerers, but her weariness from baking the cakes makes her fall into the mixing bowl. Underdog frees himself from Bric and Brac's spell and defeats the Flying Sorcerers. At first, Cup is upset that Underdog was taking his baking slave home, but after vowing he would not abuse others again, he receives one of Polly's cake recipes to make his own cakes.

== Other characters ==
=== Helen L. Patterson ===
Helen Patterson (portrayed by Samantha Bee) is the principal of Molly and Jack's school. Jack tried to fool her and his teachers into thinking he had monkey pox and tried to forge his father's signature, but she saw through the prank. Helen was created for the Underdog film.
