= Louis Sahuc =

American photographer (1942–2021)

- Born: October 20, 1942; New Orleans, Louisiana, United States
- Died: August 14, 2021 (aged 78)
- Occupation: Photographer
- Known for: Photography in "Orléans Embrace with the Secret Gardens of the Vieux Carré"
- Notable work: Orléans Embrace with the Secret Gardens of the Vieux Carré, Galatoire's Cookbook
- Awards: Double gold at the PMA Benjamin Franklin Awards (2007)

Louis Sahuc (October 20, 1942 – August 14, 2021) was an American photographer, a lifelong New Orleanian who lived in the French Quarter of New Orleans, Louisiana. Sahuc lived in one of the Pontalba Buildings, facing Jackson Square, an historic park also known as Place d' Armes described by Sahuc as, "a cesspool of bad art, bad music and bad people." Sahuc was a contributor to the nationally released multi-award-winning book Orléans Embrace with the Secret Gardens of the Vieux Carré, a compendium with authors TJ Fisher and Roy F. Guste, Jr.

The narrative and pictorial book garnered double gold at the prestigious Publishers Marketing Association PMA Benjamin Franklin Awards 2007 for "The Best New Voice Nonfiction" and "The Bill Fisher Award for Best First Book Nonfiction". Sahuc's photography is also featured in Galatoire's Cookbook. Sahuc spent much of his storied career capturing what is unique about his hometown – the architecture, misty mornings and people. Black and White Photography Magazine lauded Sahuc as a master of romantic impressionist photography.
