= Luis Antonio Ramos =

Puerto Rican actor

- Born: San Germán, Puerto Rico
- Education: High School of Performing Arts
- Occupation: Actor
- Years active: 1975–present
- Awards: Alma Award; Helen Hayes Award

Luis Antonio Ramos is a Puerto Rican actor who has been on and starred in various film and television shows such as Martin, Early Edition, New York Undercover, In the House, Friends, The Shield, CSI, and CSI: Miami.

== Early life ==
Born in San Germán, Puerto Rico, Ramos was raised in the Bronx, New York. He graduated from the High School of Performing Arts.

== Career ==
Ramos list of feature film credits includes Checking Out, Latin Dragon, L.A. Riots Spectacular, Sawbones, Scorpion Spring, Hostile Intentions, Out-of-Sync, Do the Right Thing, Sea of Love, The Sacrifice Fly, Moscow on the Hudson, The Ultimate Solution of Grace Quigley, The Secret of My Success, and The Return of Superfly, among others.

On TV, he was previously a series regular on both The Brian Benben Show and Queens and also had recurring roles on In the House, Ink, and Martin. He has also had guest-starring roles on NYPD Blue, Just Shoot Me!, The Drew Carey Show, The Jamie Foxx Show, New York Undercover, Mad About You, Law & Order and Miami Vice. In addition, Ramos has starred in a number of television movies, including The Other Side of Dark, Mothershed or Berndt, The Anissa Ayala Story, and Nails.

Miracle in Spanish Harlem, in which Ramos plays a single father of two young girls, was released in 2013. He played Carlos Rojas in Frank Reyes's The Ministers, and Ricky Guzman on USA Network's The Huntress. He has appeared on the television series How to Grow Up in America, The Unit, Burn Notice, Wanted, Numb3rs, The Shield, Early Edition, CSI: Miami, The Closer, Alias, Nip/Tuck, CSI: Crime Scene Investigation, Friends, Strong Medicine, Blue Bloods, The Division, Arli$$ and Roc.

Ramos has also been the Goodwill Ambassador for the Puerto Rican Day Parade in New York City, the Godfather for the Puerto Rican Day Parade in Los Angeles and the Godfather for the Puerto Rican parade in Cleveland, Ohio.

Ramos was nominated for an Alma Award for best supporting actor for his work in The Huntress. He also received the Helen Hayes Award for Best Actor for his performance in the play Stand Up Tragedy. His additional theater work includes Dancing on Her Knees, Cloud Tectonics, Romeo and Juliet, Tears Will Tell It All, Widows, Richard II, Henry the IV, Pendragon, The Sound of Music, A Midsummer Night's Dream, and Latins from Manhattan among others.

== Personal life ==
Ramos resides in Los Angeles. In his free time races bicycles, plays baseball, and writes a blog. In 2022, Ramos was inducted into the Bronx Walk of Fame.

== Filmography ==
=== Film ===
Year	Title	Role	Notes
1989	Do The Right Thing	Stevie	
1995	Out-of-Sync	Ramon	
1995	Hostile Intentions	Officer Sergito	
1995	Scorpion Spring	Coyote at Orchard	
1996	Dead of Night	Raleigh	
1998	October 22	Cesare	
2003	Imagining Argentina	Policeman 2	
2004	Latin Dragon	Rafael Silva	
2005	Checking Out	Luis	
2008	The Ruins	Mayan Rifleman	
2009	The Ministers	Carlos Rojas	
2011	Trouble in the Heights	Uncle Jose	
2013	A Miracle in Spanish Harlem	Tito	
2015	You Bury Your Own	Virgil	
2015	The Stockroom	Jason	

=== Television ===
Year	Title	Role	Notes
1992	Law & Order	Tommy Beltran	Episode: "Forgiveness"
1993–1994	Roc	Carlos	4 episodes
1993–1996	Martin	Luis / Mr. Lopez / Raul	4 episodes
1994	The Boys Are Back	Lenny	Episode: "The Fishing Trip"
1994, 1999	NYPD Blue	Raphael Vasquez / Ramos	2 episodes
1995	Awake to Danger	Policeman	Television film
1995	Sawbones	Hank	Television film
1995	First Time Out	Manny	Episode: "The Sale Show"
1996	New York Undercover	Ortiz	Episode: "A Time to Kill"
1996, 1997	Homeboys in Outer Space	Peacock / Weasel	2 episodes
1997	The Jamie Foxx Show	Teddy	Episode: "I am What I Scam"
1997	The Drew Carey Show	Clerk	Episode: "New York and Queens"
1997	Pacific Blue	Hector Mendoza	Episode: "Blood for Blood"
1997	Sparks	Jesus Santos	Episode: "Silent Night"
1997	Just Shoot Me!	Jesus Santos	Episode: "Jesus, It's Christmas"
1997–1998	In the House	Tito Gonzales	7 episodes
1998–2000	The Brian Benben Show	Billy Hernandez	7 episodes
1999–2000	Early Edition	Miguel Diaz	5 episodes
2000–2001	The Huntress	Ricky Guzman	28 episodes
2001	Philly	Vincent Ramos	Episode: "Tempus Fugitive"
2002	Strong Medicine	Alberto Mendoza	Episode: "Admissions"
2003	Nip/Tuck	Nico Scamarel	Episode: "Megan O'Hara"
2003	Friends	The Tanning Salon Guy	Episode: "The One with Ross's Tan"
2003	Alias	Detective Sanchez	Episode: "Prelude"
2003, 2007	CSI: Crime Scene Investigation	Various roles	2 episodes
2004	The Division	Perez	Episode: "A Death in the Family"
2005	Numbers	Jose Salazar	Episode: "Identity Crisis"
2005	Wanted	Dep. Ignacio Cortez	Episode: "The Last Temptation"
2006	The Unit	Adolpho	Episode: "Eating the Young"
2006	The Closer	Hugo	Episode: "Borderline"
2006	CSI: Miami	Tiago Matos	Episode: "Rio"
2006, 2007	The Shield	Guardo Lima	2 episodes
2010	Burn Notice	Rincon	Episode: "Friendly Fire"
2012	Common Law	Carlos Perez	Episode: "In-Laws vs. Outlaws"
2013–2014	Lucky 7	Antonio Clemente	8 episodes
2014	Madam Secretary	President Francisco Suarez	Episode: "Game On"
2014–2016	Power	Ruiz	28 episodes
2017–2022	Blue Bloods	Captain Robert Espinoza	10 episodes
2018	Elementary	Father Vega	Episode: "How to Get a Head"
2021	The Equalizer	Joseph Ruiz	Episode: "The Room Where It Happens"

== See also ==
- List of Puerto Ricans
