= Hy Anzell =

American actor (1923–2003)

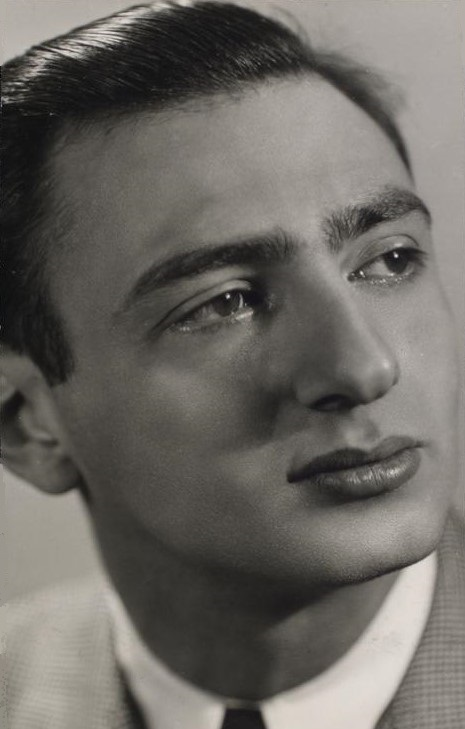
- Anzell in 1950
- Born: September 7, 1923; New York City, U.S.
- Died: August 23, 2003 (aged 79); Fresno, California, U.S.
- Occupation: Actor
- Years active: 1954–2003

Hy Anzell (September 7, 1923 – August 23, 2003) was a Yiddish-speaking American actor. He originated the role of the flower shop owner, "Mr. Mushnik", in the original off-Broadway production of Little Shop of Horrors with Ellen Greene and Lee Wilkof. He was also in the original 1976 Broadway cast of Checking Out.

He appeared in dozens of films and television programs. He had roles in a number of films directed by Woody Allen, beginning with Bananas, and notably including Annie Hall (in which he had his best-known movie role as Uncle Joey Nichols).

He died of natural causes at age 79. Anzell was Jewish.

== Filmography ==
Year	Title	Role	Notes
1954	Bengal Brigade	Sepoy	Uncredited
1954	The Silver Chalice	Workman in Joseph's Courtyard	Uncredited
1955	The Seven Little Foys	Dresser at 'Iroquois'	Uncredited
1957	The True Story of Jesse James	John - Jury Foreman	Uncredited
1957	Beau James	Reporter	Uncredited
1958	Party Girl	Man in Hall	Uncredited
1968	What's So Bad About Feeling Good?		Uncredited
1969	John and Mary	Taxi Driver	Uncredited
1971	Bananas	Patient In Operating Room	
1973	The Stone Killer	Cab Driver	
1974	The Taking of Pelham One Two Three	Latimer, Toll Booth Guard	Uncredited
1976	Death Play	Harry	
1977	Annie Hall	Joey Nichols	
1987	Radio Days	Mr. Waldbaum	
1987	Ironweed	Rosskam	
1989	Dead Bang	Captain Waxman	
1989	Crimes and Misdemeanors	Seder Guest	
1990	Pacific Heights	Locksmith	
1992	Crossing the Bridge	Manny Goldfarb	
1993	The Cemetery Club	Al	
1997	Deconstructing Harry	Max	
