= Lee Barron (musician) =

Big Band leader (1915–1993)

- Born: Elroy Vernon Lee; August 1, 1915; Minnesota, U.S.
- Died: December 21, 1993 (aged 78); Omaha, Nebraska, U.S.
- Occupation: TV personality
- Spouse: Bernice Lucile Barholz

Elroy Vernon Lee (August 1, 1915 – December 21, 1993), known professionally as Lee Barron, was an American big band leader and radio/TV personality.

== Early life ==
He was born in Minnesota. Barron was born to Earl C. Lee (1883 Iowa – 1931) and Emma J. Lee (née Sylvester; b. 8 August 1887 Polk County, Minnesota; d. 24 July 1970 Crookston, Minnesota). Elroy had one brother, Clayton H. Lee (born 19 April 1921 Crookston, Minnesota). Elroy married Bernice Lucile Lee (née Barholz; (28 April 1918 - 9 July 2007). A stone memorial commemorating the lives of Elroy and Bernice was laid at Concordia Cemetery, Fertile, Minnesota.

== Career ==
His bands included Elroy Lee and the Crookston Dinner Club Orchestra, Snorty and His City Slickers, Lee Barron and His Belltone Music, and territory band The Lee Barron Orchestra.

Barron's radio career started at Nebraska-based KOIL station in 1944. He worked for other radio and TV stations in later years.

Lew Anderson was a member of the Lee Barron Orchestra.

== Author ==
In the late 1980s, he wrote the book The Odyssey of the Mid-Nite Flyer, which charts many of the unknown territory bands of the Midwest throughout the 1930s-1950's. This was released on 1 June 1987 via Midwest Band Books.

Barron died in Omaha, aged 78.
