= Howdy Doody =

American children's television series (1947–1960)

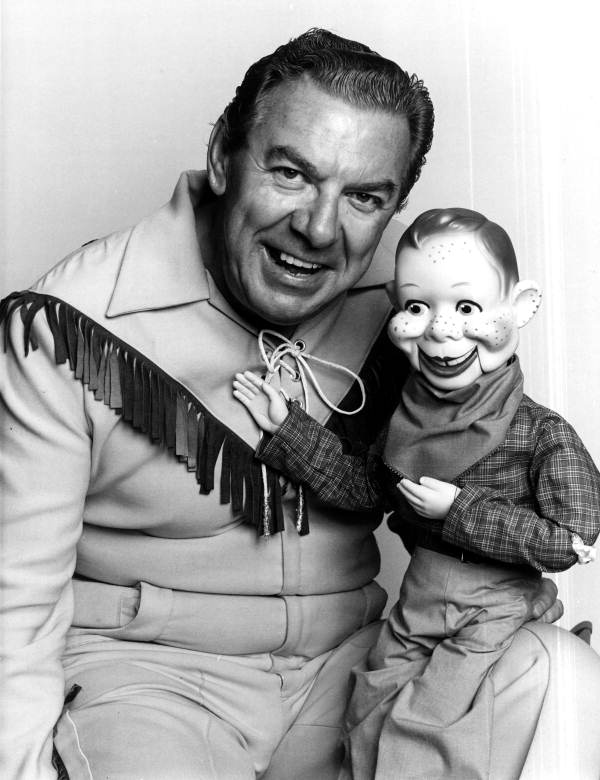
- Buffalo Bob Smith and Howdy Doody in 1972
- Genre: Children's television series
- Created by: E. Roger Muir
- Presented by: Buffalo Bob Smith; Howdy Doody
- Starring: Bob Keeshan; Lew Anderson; Bobby Nicholson
- Country of origin: United States

Production
- Producers: E. Roger Muir and Nick Nicholson
- Running time: 60 minutes (1947–1948, 1960); 30 minutes (1948–1960)

Original release
- Network: NBC
- Release: December 27, 1947 – September 24, 1960

Howdy Doody is an American children's television program with circus and Western frontier themes, that was created and produced by Victor F. Campbell and E. Roger Muir. It was broadcast on the NBC television network in the United States from December 27, 1947, until September 24, 1960. It was a pioneer of children's programming and set the pattern for many similar shows. One of the first television series produced at NBC in Rockefeller Center, in Studio 3A, it pioneered color production in 1956 and NBC (then owned by RCA Television) used the show to promote color television sets in the late 1950s.

== Story ==
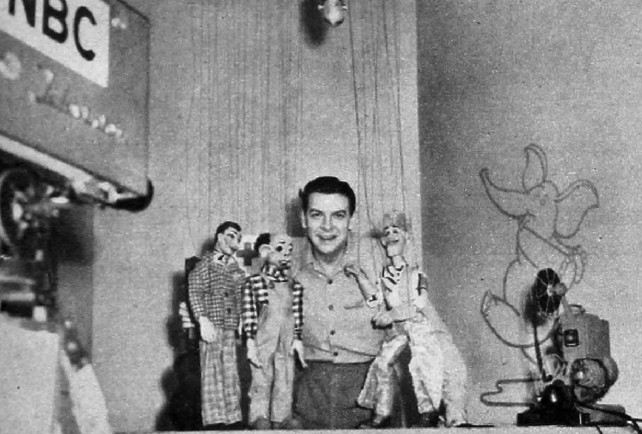
On the air with the first Howdy Doody puppet. The original Howdy is on the right. The two other puppets are Mr. Huff and Eustis, who appeared only for a short time on a Saturday edition of the Puppet Playhouse show.

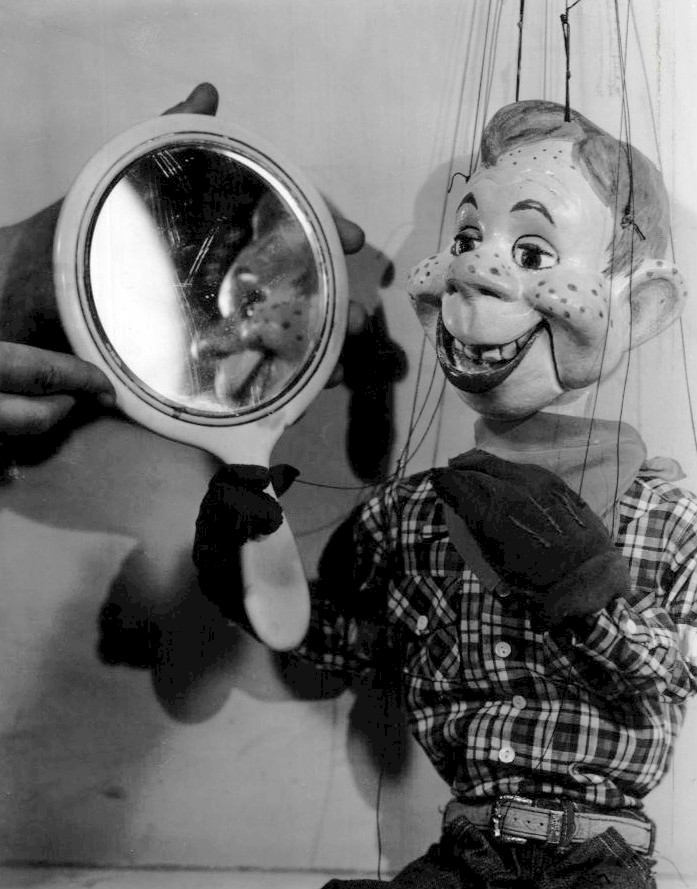
Howdy Doody viewing the results of his "plastic surgery"

Buffalo Bob Smith created Howdy Doody during his days as a radio announcer on WNBC. At that time, Howdy Doody was only a voice Smith performed on the radio. When Smith made an appearance on NBC's television program Puppet Playhouse on December 27, 1947, the reception for the character was great enough to begin a demand for a visual character for television. Frank Paris, a puppeteer whose puppets appeared on the program, was asked to create a Howdy Doody puppet.

Smith, the show's host, was dubbed "Buffalo Bob" early in the show's run (a reference to the historical American frontier character Buffalo Bill as well as to Smith's hometown of Buffalo, New York). At first the set was supposed to be a circus tent, but it soon was changed to a western town. Smith wore cowboy garb, as did the puppet. The name of the puppet star was derived from the expression "howdy doody"/"howdy do", a commonplace corruption of the phrase "How do you do?" used in the western United States and in Britain as well (for example, "Here's a howdy-do" from The Mikado). (The straightforward use of that expression was also in the theme song's lyrics.) Smith, who had gotten his start as a singing radio personality in Buffalo, frequently used music in the program. Cast members Lew Anderson and Robert "Nick" Nicholson both were experienced jazz musicians.

As both the character and TV program grew in popularity, demand for Howdy Doody related merchandise began to surface. By 1948, toymakers and department stores had been approached with requests for Howdy Doody dolls and similar items. The Macy's department store chain contacted Frank Paris to ask about rights for a Howdy Doody doll. However, while Paris had created the puppet, Smith owned the rights to the character. An argument ensued between the two men, Paris claiming he felt he was being cheated out of any financial benefits. After one such disagreement, Paris took the puppet and angrily left the NBC studios about four hours before the show was to air live – leaving the program with no "star". It was not the first time this had happened.

With Paris's past disappearances, impromptu excuses regarding the whereabouts of Howdy Doody had hastily been concocted. This time, an elaborate explanation was offered – that Howdy was busy with elections on the campaign trail. NBC hurriedly constructed a map of the United States that allowed viewers, with the help of Smith, learn where Howdy was on the road. The explanation continued that, while on the campaign trail, Howdy decided to improve his appearance with some plastic surgery. This made it possible for the network to hire Disney animator Mel Shaw and his business partner Bob Allen to design (refer to U.S. Patent D156687 for a "new, original, and ornamental design" for the puppet) and Velma Wayne Dawson to build and operate a visual character more handsome and appealing than Paris's original, which Smith had called "the ugliest puppet imaginable." Because Paris did not provide the character's voice, Howdy's remained the same after his appearance changed. The puppet remembered as the "original" Howdy Doody replaced Paris's original.

== Howdy Doody ==
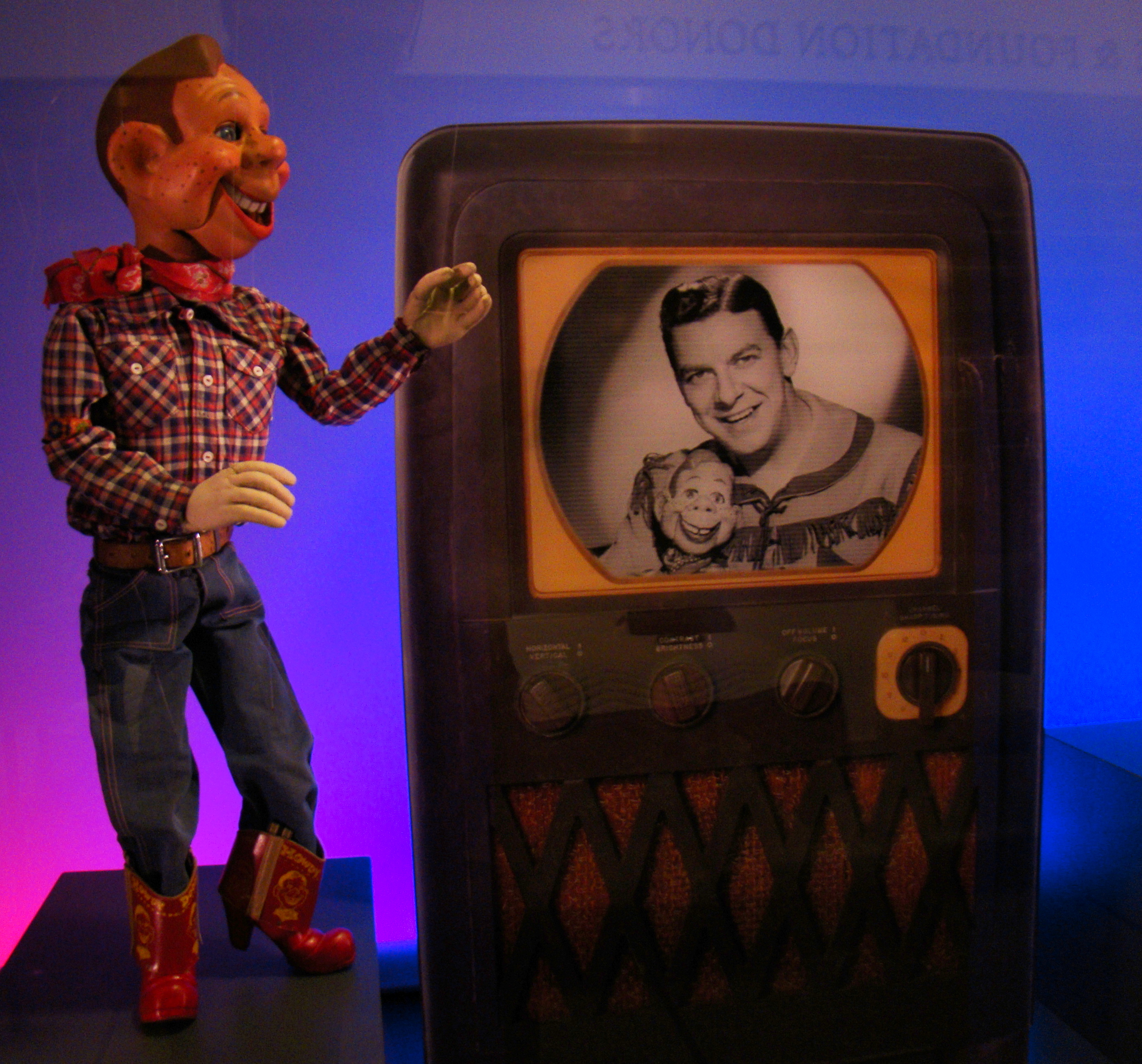
The original Dawson version of Howdy Doody at Detroit Institute of Arts

Howdy Doody himself was a freckle-faced boy marionette with 48 freckles, one for each state of the union as it was at the time of his creation (until January 3, 1959, when Alaska became the 49th state), and originally was voiced by Smith via prerecorded dialogue as Smith could not perform ventriloquy. The Howdy Doody show's various marionettes were designed and built by puppeteers Dawson, Scott Brinker (the show's prop man), and Rufus Rose throughout the show's run.

The redheaded Howdy marionette on the original show was operated with 11 strings: two heads, one mouth, one eye, two shoulders, one back, two hands and two knees. Three strings were added when the show returned – two elbows and one nose. The original marionette now resides at the Detroit Institute of Arts.

=== Replicas of Howdy ===
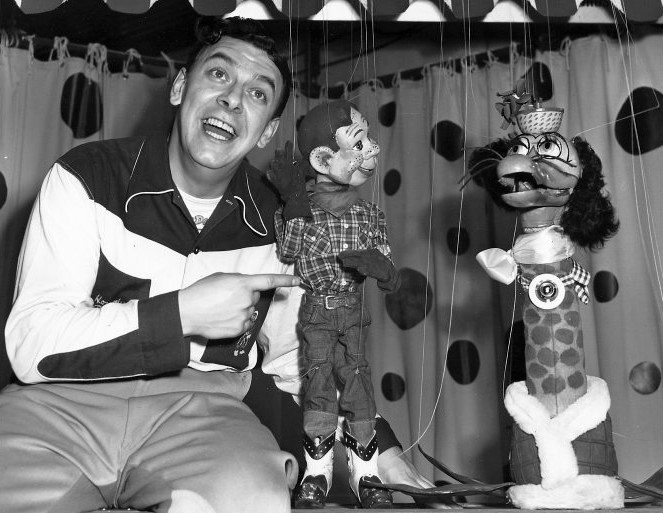
Buffalo Bob with Howdy Doody and Flub-a-Dub

There were duplicate Howdy Doody puppets, designed to be used expressly for off-the-air purposes (lighting rehearsals, personal appearances, etc.), although surviving kinescope recordings clearly show that these duplicate puppets occasionally were used on the air. "Double Doody", the Howdy stand-in, is now in the entertainment collection at the Smithsonian National Museum of American History.

Photo Doody is the near-stringless marionette used in personal appearances, photos, parades, and in the famed NBC test pattern. He was sold by Lelands Auction in 1997 for more than $113,000 to a private art collector, TJ Fisher.

In addition to the original vintage puppets, puppet maker Alan Semok (at the request of Bob Smith in the early 1990s) created several precise replicas of Howdy, including—thanks to improved materials and new molding techniques—a more exact marionette replica than had ever been produced, as well as a new Photo Doody which Smith used in personal appearances until his death from cancer on July 30, 1998, at the age of 80. One of Semok's marionette duplicates appears on a 2005 cover of TV Guide magazine as part of a series recreating classic covers from the magazine's history. The cover featured Howdy with TV host Conan O'Brien dressed as Buffalo Bob Smith. Another of the Semok duplicates resides in the International Museum and Library of the Conjuring Arts, the private museum owned by illusionist David Copperfield.

=== Custody battle ===
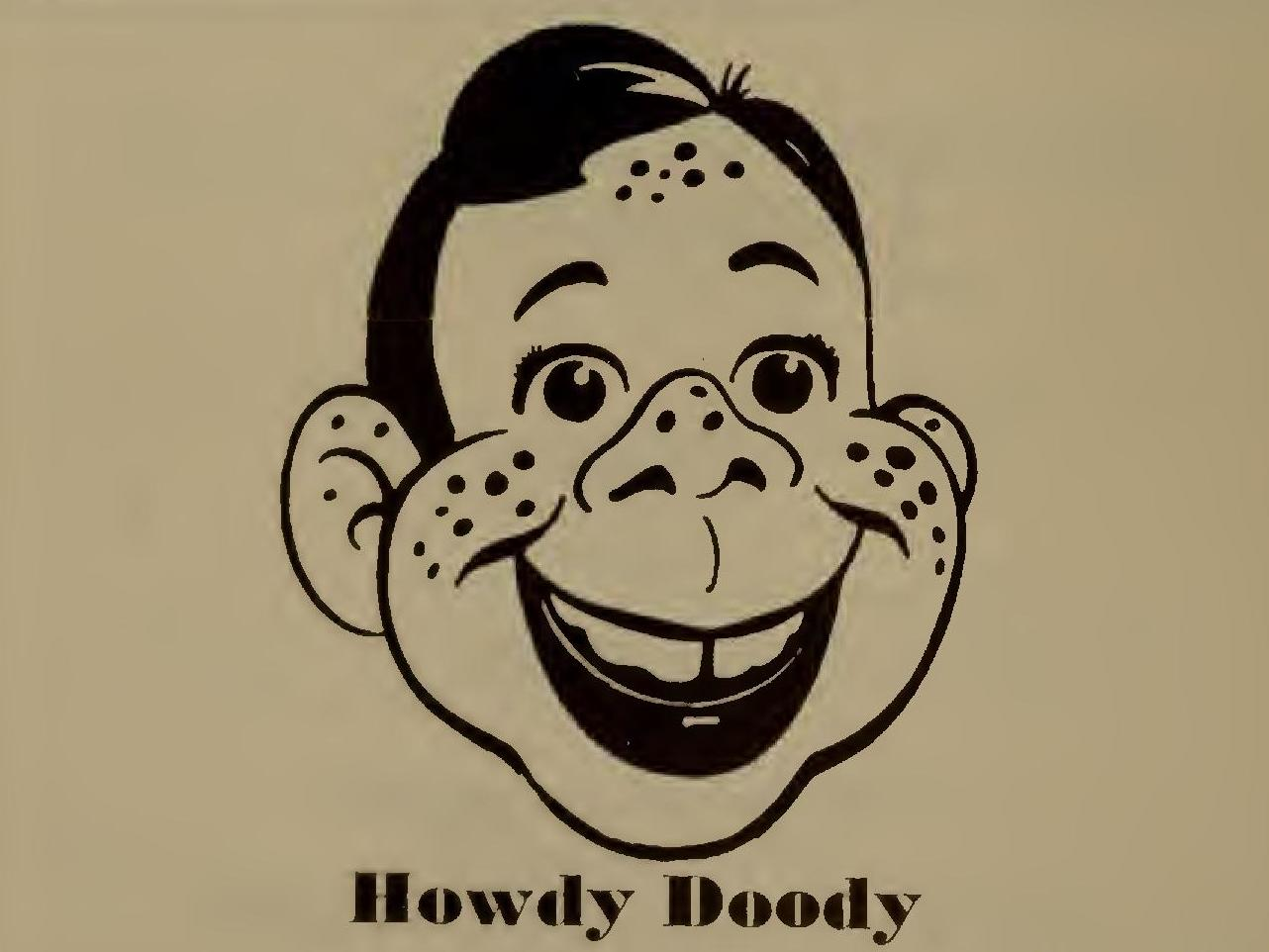
Howdy Doody ad from The Radio Annual and Television Yearbook, 1955

After Bob Smith's death in 1998, a legal dispute arose over ownership of the original Howdy Doody puppet. The Detroit Institute of Arts (DIA) claimed that puppeteer Rufus Rose had agreed decades earlier to donate the marionette to the museum, while Rose’s heirs disputed the claim and questioned whether the puppet was the original used on the television show. During the litigation, the puppet was kept in a bank vault while the parties contested its ownership.

During one day of deposition, puppet maker Semok (who had performed various maintenance and repainting of the original Howdy marionette beginning in 1989) was called upon to unseal a trap door on the back of the puppet's head; Velma Dawson, the puppet's original builder, who was 88 at the time of the deposition, was present and given the opportunity to examine the inside of the head in an effort to verify that the puppet in question was the original she created. Despite 50 years of numerous repairs, repaints, and replaced body parts, Dawson eventually declared the head of the puppet to be the one she originally made in 1948.

After letters between Rose and NBC appeared, showing that he intended for the museum to have the puppet, the Detroit Institute of Arts ultimately prevailed and has custody of the original Howdy since 2001. After Detroit's declaration of bankruptcy in 2013, there were rumors about the possibility of selling the puppet, along with the museum's assets, to help pay off the city's $18–20 billion debt. However, it was determined that doing so would be illegal. The puppet was featured in two exhibitions at the DIA, one in 2015 and one in early 2020.

== Characters ==
=== Puppet characters ===
Phineas T. Bluster

Besides Howdy Doody, other major characters in the show include:

- Heidi Doody – Introduced as a stranger who saved Buffalo Bob's life in Africa, she was adopted as Howdy's sister.
- Phineas T. Bluster – Resident skinflint, mayor of Doodyville, and nemesis of Howdy; one of the Bluster triplets.
- Petey Bluster – Phineas's nephew.
- Don José Bluster – The South American Bluster brother.
- Thaddeus Bluster – Another Bluster brother.
- Hector Hamhock Bluster – The British Bluster brother.
- Princess Summerfall Winterspring – Originally played by actress Judy Tyler, who afterwards appeared opposite Elvis Presley in the 1957 film Jailhouse Rock. After she was killed in a car accident on July 3, 1957, the character was portrayed by a marionette.
- Dilly Dally – Howdy's naive boyhood friend.
- Inspector John J. Fadoozle – "America's No. 1 private eye" was revealed as the mysterious "Mr. X" who used the pseudonym to run against Howdy for the office of President of All the Boys and Girls of America. Children could vote by using ballots attached to the wrappers of loaves of Wonder Bread, a major sponsor of the show.
- Chief Thunderthud and Chief Featherman – Two of several Native American characters used to emphasize the show's western theme.
- J. Cornelius Cobb – The shopkeeper (played by Robert "Nick" Nicholson), who has a strong dislike for clowns.
- Sandra the Witch
- Captain Windy Scuttlebut
- Flub-a-Dub – A hybrid of eight animals. He has a duck's bill, a cat's whiskers, a spaniel's ears, a giraffe's neck, a dachshund's body, a seal's flippers, a pig's tail, and an elephant's memory.

=== Animal puppets ===
The show also features animal puppets such as:

- Hyde and Zeke – Twin bears.
- Mambo – An African elephant.
- Tizzy – A dinosaur.
- Paddle – A gnu.
- Tommy Turtle – A slow-talking turtle who is not very bright.

=== Human characters ===
Clarabell the Clown

There are also several human characters, most notably:

- Clarabell – The mute clown who communicates in a variety of ways – by mime, by honking horns on his belt, and by squirting seltzer. Originally played by Bob Keeshan, who went on to create the children's TV character Captain Kangaroo, he was later played by Robert "Nick" Nicholson and finally by Lew Anderson. Clarabell does not talk because the actor would have had to be paid scale, and it was a low-budget show.
- J. Cornelius Cobb – (played by Nicholson concurrently with his role as Clarabell, then exclusively when Lew Anderson took over the Clarabell role)
- Sir Archibald played by Dayton Allen (see below), a comic actor – An explorer.
- Chief Thunderthud (portrayed by Bill Le Cornec) – Head of the Ooragnak (kangaroo spelled backward) tribe of American Indians. Edward Kean originated Thunderthud's greeting "Kowabonga!" – a nonsense word that eventually became part of the California surfer culture lexicon.
- Oil Well Willie (portrayed by Bill Le Cornec) – A bearded oil exploration driller who always comes up dry.
- Princess Summerfall Winterspring (portrayed by Judy Tyler) – As a teenager, Tyler began her career with this supporting role, which she played from 1950 to 1956. The opportunity led to Tyler breaking out to starring roles on Broadway and eventually Hollywood, where she notably co-starred with Elvis Presley in Jailhouse Rock before her death in an auto accident.
- Gus Gasbags (played by Ed Alberian) – A man who makes animal balloons.

The characters inhabit the fictional town of Doodyville. Several characters (including Ugly Sam, the world's worst wrestler, and Pierre the Chef) were played by comedian Dayton Allen, who would become a cast regular on NBC's prime time The Steve Allen Show.

The Howdy show's non-televised rehearsals were renowned for including considerable double-entendre dialogue between the cast members (particularly the witty Allen) and the puppet characters. Corny Cobb was played by "Nick" Nicholson in 1952, by puppeteer Rufus Rose in 1953 and 1954 while Nicholson assumed the role of Clarabell, and again by Nicholson from early 1955 until the end of the show.

Clarabell was first played by Bob Keeshan (who also played Chief Featherman). He continued in that role until December 1952 when he, Allen, puppeteer Rhoda Mann, and LeCornec left the show over a salary dispute. The role of Clarabell was then taken by Nicholson, who played it for about 22 months. In January 1955, the role was turned over to Anderson who kept it until the series ended and for all subsequent revivals and specials, while Nicholson took on the role of J. Cornelius "Corny" Cobb. Each of the cast members also played other roles as required.

At the end of the final episode, telecast on September 24, 1960, Clarabell broke his series-long silence to say the final words of the final broadcast: "Goodbye, kids."

== Peanut gallery ==
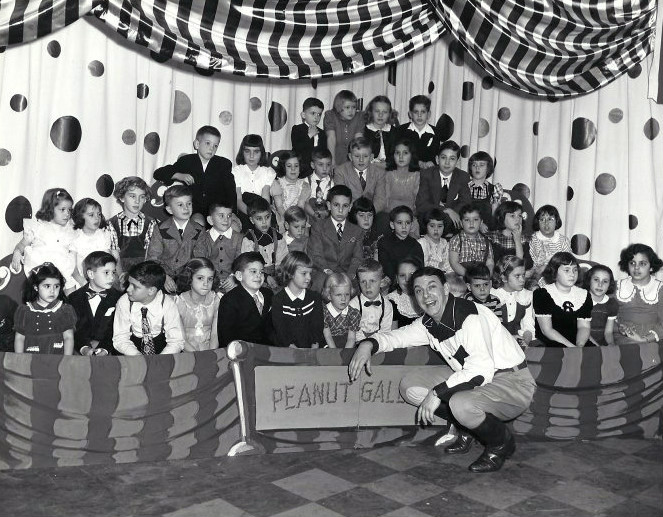
The peanut gallery, circa 1949

A distinctive feature was the Peanut Gallery, onstage bleachers seating about 40 children. Each show began with Buffalo Bob asking, "Say kids, what time is it?" and the kids yelling in unison, "It's Howdy Doody Time!" The kids then sang the show's theme song (to the tune of "Ta-ra-ra Boom-de-ay"):

It's Howdy Doody time,
It's Howdy Doody time,
Bob Smith and Howdy, too,
Say "Howdy do" to you.
Let's give a rousing cheer
'Cause Howdy Doody's here.
It's time to start the show
So kids, let's go!

It thus was one of the first television shows with audience participation as a major component.

In many of the 1949–1954 episodes released on DVD by Mill Creek Entertainment in 2008, the children can be heard singing jingles for commercial breaks, with Buffalo Bob or Howdy leading them and the lyrics appearing on screen. Colgate toothpaste, Halo Shampoo, 3 Musketeers candy bars, Tootsie Rolls and Poll Parrot Shoes were among the products advertised this way, as well as series-long sponsor Wonder Bread.

The popularity of Howdy Doody and its Peanut Gallery led executives at United Features Syndicate to use the name Peanuts for syndication of Charles M. Schulz's Li'l Folks comic strip, reportedly to the lifelong chagrin of Schulz.

== Broadcast history ==
Originally an hour on Tuesdays, Thursdays and Saturdays (at 5 p.m. Eastern), the show moved to Monday - Friday, 5:30 to 6 p.m. EST in August 1948. During part of its run, it was preceded by The Gabby Hayes Show, a 15-minute production hosted by veteran cowboy sidekick actor George "Gabby" Hayes, perhaps best known for his appearances alongside Roy Rogers. In June 1956, it began to be shown on Saturday mornings only (10-10:30 Eastern), continuing until its final broadcast on September 24, 1960, with the last years pre-recorded on color videotape.

=== Smith's absence ===
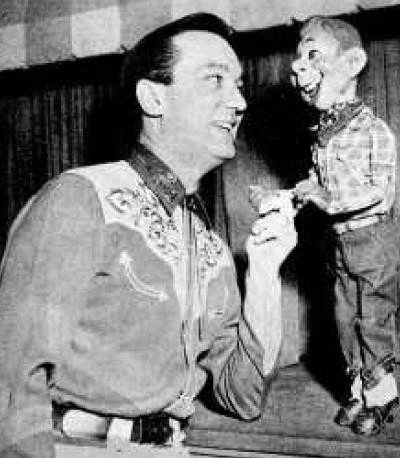
Ted Brown fills in for the recuperating Bob Smith as "Bison Bill."

In September 1954, Bob Smith suffered a heart attack and was ordered by his doctors to recuperate at home. NBC managed to keep the show going with guest hosts, including Gabby Hayes and New York disc jockey Ted Brown as Bison Bill, explaining to kids that Smith was vacationing at Pioneer Village. While kids generally were satisfied with the explanation, show sponsors insisted they wanted Smith himself to hawk their products. In response, NBC set up a special studio at Smith's home so he could appear live "from Pioneer Village" to do commercials.

During Smith's absence from the show, Howdy was voiced by Allen Swift. Swift continued to voice the character for the remainder of the show's run, even after Smith's return in September 1955.

=== Final episode ===
The final episode, "Clarabell's Big Surprise," was broadcast on September 24, 1960. The hour-long episode was mostly a fond look back at highlights of the show's past. Meanwhile, in the midst of it all, Clarabell has what he calls a "big surprise." The rest of the cast attempts to find out what it is throughout the entire show, with only Doodyville Mayor Phineas T. Bluster succeeding and promising to keep it a secret. ("But," he says upon leaving, "it's not gonna be easy to keep something like this a secret for long!!")

It was only in the episode's final moments that Clarabell, still pantomiming and using his horn, finally revealed his surprise to Howdy Doody and Buffalo Bob: he could actually speak. Amazed, Bob frantically encouraged Clarabell to prove it as he would never get another chance. His lips quivered as the camera slowly moved in for a close-up on his face; a drum and cymbal roll grew louder and abruptly stopped right before Clarabell quietly said, "Goodbye, kids." A tear could be seen in his right eye as the picture faded to black, and in the ensuing quiet, some sobs could be heard in the background.

The show quietly ended with a roll of credits over an empty, darkened set as "Auld Lang Syne" was played on a Celesta, followed by an announcement that The Shari Lewis Show would be seen in its place at that time next week followed by a spot for the TV series National Velvet.

The restored color videotape of the final broadcast is available commercially.

== Merchandising and licensing ==
Three Musketeers candy bars offered a promotion early in 1950 in which sending in 10 cents and one wrapper from a Three Musketeers bar obtained a Howdy Doody puppet. The show had two one-minute announcements about the promotion on consecutive weeks. The first announcement resulted in 80,000 requests; the second increased the total number of requests to 240,000.

In the early 1960s, William Rosenberg founded a fast food chain called Howdy Beefburgers (later Howdy Beef n' Burger) in Massachusetts, locating many of its restaurants beside Dunkin' Donuts shops so they could share common parking lots to compete with larger chains such as McDonald's for retail space and customer draw. Howdy Beefburgers even adopted Howdy as its mascot. Serving such products as hamburgers, French fries, fish sandwiches and New England clam chowder, the chain had restaurants in as many as 27 locations throughout New England before dissolving in the late 1970s.

A 1955 merchandise catalog had 24 pages showcasing the range of products licensed by the show. The extensive merchandising included the aforementioned puppet, toys and clothing, plus tie-ins with cereals and other food products.

Magician Teller (of Penn and Teller) has cited the Howdy Doody Magic Kit (licensed by Mars Inc.) as the childhood inspiration for his future career.

Howdy Doody dolls and marionettes of Howdy Doody and Flub-a-dub were sold commercially. There were also two other marionettes, Don José and Hector Hamhock Bluster, brothers of Phineas T.

=== Comics ===
Chad Grothkopf's Howdy Doody (February 24, 1952)

Dell Comics published a comic book from 1950 to 1956 along with Little Golden Books and Tell-a-Tale books, many written by Doody head writer Edward Kean. In addition Dell scribe John Stanley contributed scripts for the comic book. Kean also did some scripting (along with Stan Lee) of a Sunday-only Doody comic strip through United Feature Syndicate which ran from October 15, 1950, to June 21, 1953. Milt Neil and Chad Grothkopf were the initial art team through December 3, 1950, after which Grothkopf handled the art solo.

=== Cartoon ===
UPA was hired to do an animated cartoon (Howdy Doody and his Magic Hat), the first directorial effort of Gene Deitch and long thought lost until a print turned up at the Library of Congress in 2010. On April 15 of that year, the film was posted online.

== Home media ==
On February 20, 2001, NBC Home Video licensed Image Entertainment to release four individual discs, each containing four episodes. These shows came from the latter part of the series run, from 1957 to 1960. One show from April 1, 1953, was also included.

On November 4, 2008, Mill Creek Entertainment (under license from NBCUniversal) released Howdy Doody Show: 40 Episodes 1949–1954 on DVD in Region 1. The five-disc set features 40 of the best episodes from the series as selected by fans as well as the final color episode (also on the Image discs) and bonus features.

Early episodes of Howdy Doody are available in the public domain and are online for audiences to view.

== Howdy Doody's return ==
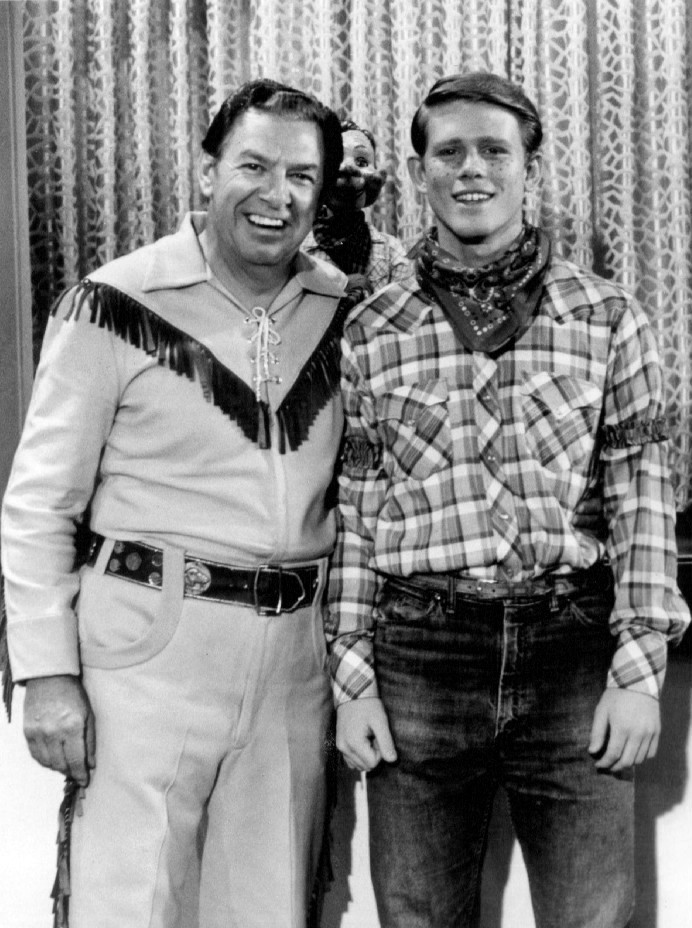
In a 1975 episode of Happy Days, Richie Cunningham (Ron Howard) appears on The Howdy Doody Show after entering a Howdy Doody lookalike contest in Milwaukee.

The 1970s brought a wave of nostalgia interest in an idealized representation of the 1950s, and with it films such as American Graffiti and the TV show Happy Days. An episode of Happy Days was entitled "The Howdy Doody Show" (number 33 of the series; original airdate February 18, 1975) during the series' second season, having a Howdy Doody storyline featuring Smith as Buffalo Bob with actor Bob Brunner as Clarabell.

=== The New Howdy Doody Show ===
Shortly thereafter, Nicholson-Muir Productions (owned by Nick Nicholson and E. Roger Muir) acquired from NBC the rights to produce the New Howdy Doody Show, an attempt by Buffalo Bob and most of the old cast to recreate their past fame. For this incarnation, which aired in first-run syndication, the Howdy marionette had actual hair in a contemporary 1970s style and was operated by puppeteer Pady Blackwood.

New cast members included:

- Nicholson Muir (portrayed by Howdy veteran LeCornec) –- The flamboyant fictional producer of the show. He is named for the production company.
- Corny Cobb (portrayed by Nick Nicholson) -– The character now was working as a prop man rather than as a shopkeeper.
- Jackie Davis (himself) – The band leader.
- Happy Harmony (portrayed by Marilyn Patch, then Dr. Marilyn Plavocos Arnone) – A teacher in Doodyville who fills the same role as the Princess Summerfall Winterspring character.
- Lew Anderson returned as Clarabell.

Crew members:

- Art Director – Milt Neal
- Costumer – Valerie E. Naiman

It was staged before a larger Peanut Gallery of children and their parents originating from and taped in Florida. The revived series was not as successful as its predecessor, lasting only 130 episodes (26 shows, each consisting of 5 parts); the show debuted at the start of August 1976 and was canceled six months later at the end of January 1977.

Reruns of the show later aired on Sundays on Cozi TV. Amazon Prime then began offering 20 episodes online. A limited number of episodes were released on DVD.

=== It's Howdy Doody Time: A 40-Year Celebration ===
A decade later, the show celebrated its 40th anniversary with a two-hour syndicated TV special, It's Howdy Doody Time: A 40-Year Celebration, featuring Smith, Anderson, Nicholson and LeCornec, who reprised his role as Chief Thunderthud.

Late in life, Bob Smith befriended New York-based fan Jack Roth, who already was quite familiar with Smith's gallery of puppet characters. Since Smith's death in 1998, Roth usually has provided the voice for Howdy in TV appearances and live venues. Actor-puppeteer Alan Semok, who was approached by Smith to re-create the Howdy marionette, also has voiced Howdy.

== International versions ==
Like the later Sesame Street, Canadian, Cuban, and Mexican spin-off shows were licensed using local casts and duplicate puppets.

=== La Hora de Jaudi Dudi ===
In March 1953, the Kagran Corporation, the organization which produced the original Howdy Doody for NBC, started production on La Hora de Jaudi Dudi, a daily Spanish-language version of the program filmed in Mexico City. The program aired over Canal 2 in Mexico and, beginning on April 27, CMQ-TV in Havana, Cuba. According to Billboard, the series featured a freckleless Howdy puppet and a new puppet named Don Burro. While the aim was to produce a series to distribute to the entirety of Latin America, the company halted production after six months due to unforeseen production difficulties (at the time, Mexican television programming was scarce and often improvised, unlike the American-influenced Cuban market, apart from the fact that Mexican broadcasters weren't interested in foreign production) and market considerations (until 1960, most South American countries did not have television services or supermarkets; by 1953, the only ones in the region were located in Havana and Lima, Peru). 96 half-hour episodes were filmed.

Cuban television later launched its own local version, named Club Chirikin, which lasted through 1959 or early 1960 over CMQ. It was a Monday-Saturday show produced by Stone Associates, a company formed by former Kagran president Martin Stone.

=== The Canadian Howdy Doody Show ===
The Canadian Howdy Doody Show was produced by the Canadian Broadcasting Corporation, and first aired on November 15, 1954. The CBC built its own Doodyville in a Toronto studio, and the show was set in Canada's north. It was more low-budget than its American counterpart, with less raucous plots and fewer villainous villains, as well as a more educational orientation.

Most of the puppet characters, including Phineas T. Bluster, the cranky mayor and chief killjoy of Doodyville, Dilly Dally, a foolish carpenter who was usually the butt of Bluster's plots, Flub-a-dub, a beast with a duck's head, cat's whiskers, and the parts of several other animals, Heidi Doody, Howdy's sister, and Howdy himself, of course, were retained from the U.S. production.

But it had some major differences from its American cousin. Other puppets included Percival, a parrot, and Mr. X, who zipped through time and space in his "whatsis box". The show had Howdy and Clarabell, but most of the human performers differed in the CBC version. There was no Buffalo Bob, for instance. The show's host was Timber Tom, a forest ranger, played by Peter Mews.

Mews later appeared in the films The Unforeseen, Folio and First Performance. He also appeared on television in the 1954 production of Delilah, and the 1974 mini-series The National Dream. One of his most notable works was as Matthew Cuthbert in the Charlottetown Festival's production of Anne of Green Gables, which he played for over twenty years. Peter Mews died on November 24, 1984, at the age of 63.

Clarabell was played by Alfie Scopp. Like the American Clarabell, he communicated in mime, by honking horns on his belt, and by squirting seltzer.

Scopp was born in London, England in 1919, and came to Canada with his family when they immigrated to Montreal. Scopp had a long career in both television and film, with one of his most notable roles being the bookseller Avram in the 1971 film Fiddler on the Roof. He is also known for being the voice of "Charlie-in-the-Box" on the 1964 television Christmas special, Rudolph the Red-Nosed Reindeer.

Toby Tarnow played Princess Pan of the Forest, generally referred to as Pan. Tarnow was born in Gravelbourg Saskatchewan in 1937. She started studying acting at the Lorne Green Academy of Radio Arts at the age of eight, and by the age of ten she was already performing professionally on CBC radio. In 1954, she became the first actress to play Anne in the live televised production of the musical adaptation of Anne of Green Gables.

Following her role as Princess Pan on Howdy Doody, she had a recurring role on the CBC children's program Mr. Dressup (the spinoff from Fred Rogers' Misterrogers, after he took his neighborhood to Pittsburgh). Tarnow's wide career encompassed radio, television, film, theater, and writing.

After moving to the United States, she founded the Riverbend School of Theater Arts for the Boys and Girls Club in New Hampshire. In 2010, she was awarded the Children and Youth Theater Award by the New Hampshire Theater Awards.

Barbara Hamilton

Born in Kingston Ontario, she attended the University of Toronto before embarking on a career in theatre arts. Her first big break came with a role in Arsenic and Old Lace at Toronto's historic Royal Alexandra Theatre. From there, she went on to perform in theatres across the country, in works that ranged from classical tragedies to modern comedies.

She originated the role of Marilla Cuthbert in both the Canadian and London West End productions of Anne of Green Gables, and was later a regular on the CBC's Road to Avonlea, and appeared in many other roles in film and television.

Larry D. Mann played good-natured pirate Cap'n Scuttlebutt. In Canada, the Cap'n was a live character, unlike the American Cap'n, which was a puppet. Mann was also the voice of Flub-a-Dub on the show.

Mann was a character actor whose face and acting were often recognizable. Born in Toronto on December 18, 1922, Mann was a disc jockey on radio station 1050 CHUM before he began his acting career. In his four decades of performing, Mann's many credits included Get Smart, Gunsmoke, The Man from Uncle, Hill Street Blues, and The Dukes of Hazzard, to mention just a few of his TV appearances. Two of his most prominent movie roles were In the Heat of the Night (1967) and The Sting (1973). Larry Mann died in Los Angeles California on January 6, 2014, at the age of 91.

Another famous person that appeared on the Canadian Howdy was the famous singer and later Broadway star Robert Goulet. He played the character Trapper Pierre.

The Canadian show had one other Princess, named Haida, who had the powers of a Medicine Man. The character was played by actress Caryl McBain. Other characters on the show included Jean Cavall as Papa La Touke and Drew Thompson as Mendel Mason.

Some sources credit James Doohan (Scotty on the original Star Trek) as being the first host of the show, playing Ranger Bill for a short time at the beginning of the series. As the story goes, after the chief forest ranger called him away to fight a forest fire in November 1954, Timber Tom, played by Peter Mews, took his place. However, in his autobiography Doohan never credits himself in the role. And the show's first public episode was November 15, so his time on the show was probably very short-lived.

Another actress started out playing Princess Pan in 1954. That was Maxine Miller, who later went on to play Nurse Farmer in the first three seasons of Misterrogers, the previously mentioned Canadian precursor to Mister Rogers' Neighborhood in the U.S. She has since appeared in over 120 movies and television shows.

A young William Shatner (later to go on to fame as Star Trek's Captain Kirk). would in 1954 be featured on the show as the character Ranger Bob.

One of the shows characters was named Mr. X. Not to be confused with the American Howdy Doody character with the same name, the Canadian Mr. X would teach history to the children watching. To do so, he would travel through space and time in what he called his "Whatsis Box".

The actors who voiced the different puppet characters on the Canadian Howdy Doody Show included Claude Rae (Howdy Doody, Phineas T. Bluster and Mr. X), Jacqueline White (Howdy Doody), Norma MacMillan (Heidi Doody), Donna Miller (Prunella Bluster and Heidi Doody), and Jack Mather (Dilly Dally, Percival Parrot, and other characters). And Larry Mann, who already had experience working with puppets with CBC's Uncle Chichimus, was the voice of Flub-a-dub. The puppeteers who worked the strings were Hal and Renée Marquette.

In addition to the adventures of the citizens of Doodyville and the Peanut Gallery, the show also featured film presentation on nature or travel. The scripts were adapted by Cliff Braggins, who also wrote music for the show. Quentin Maclean provided organ music. The program was produced by Paddy Sampson. After nearly five years on the air, the CBC decided to cancel the show to develop children's programming of its own. The Canadian Howdy Doody's last broadcast was on June 26, 1959.

== Cultural references ==
Long after its cancellation, Howdy Doody has continued to be referenced (directly and indirectly) in various cultural media, particularly in the United States.

=== Art ===
In December 1980, pop artist Andy Warhol photographed Howdy Doody for his Myths (1981) series.

=== Music ===
In 1969, bubblegum pop band 1910 Fruitgum Company recorded a song titled "Bring Back Howdy Doody" pleading broadcasters to return Howdy Doody to the air. The song was included as the "B-Side" for their hit single "Indian Giver" but deliberately pressed backwards as a way of deterring radio stations from playing it, and labeled with a different title, "Pow Wow".. The song was later recorded by another group called Flying Giraffe. In the summer of 1971, a studio group, calling themselves The P-Nut Gallery, recorded "Do You Know What Time It Is?" on the Buddah label and had a minor hit inspired by the show's imminent return.

The 1975 Chicago song Old Days mentions the show in the lyrics.

In the 1982 musical Little Shop of Horrors, during the song "Somewhere That's Green", the character Audrey sings, "The kids play Howdy Doody as the sun sets in the west".

=== Television ===
Pee-wee's Playhouse drew from Howdy Doody during its successful run on CBS from 1986 to 1991.

In "Wally's Gang", a 1989 episode of Hard Time on Planet Earth, Control shows Jesse the Howdy Doody intro as an example of Earth's "most highly revered" electronic teachers.

In 1999, Howdy Doody made a cameo appearance in The Simpsons episode Make Room for Lisa.

In a 2014 episode of the American horror anthology television series American Horror Story titled "Edward Mordrake", the character Dandy flies into a rage when his mother gifts him a Howdy Doody costume for Halloween.

=== Film ===
Time travel and flashback scenes in the 1988 film Scrooged, the 1990 film Back to the Future Part III, and the 2008 film Hellboy II: The Golden Army, featured television broadcasts of the show to place the setting in the 1950s.

The toy character Woody from the film franchise Toy Story (launched in 1995) draws heavy inspiration from Howdy Doody.

In the 2008 film Indiana Jones and the Kingdom of the Crystal Skull, Indiana Jones stumbles into a nuclear test facility where the show is playing in one of the houses. He takes cover in a refrigerator as the explosion slowly drowns out the sound of the Howdy Doody theme song.

== Bibliography ==
- Davis, Stephen (1987). Say Kids! What Time Is It? Notes from the Peanut Gallery. Boston: Little, Brown and Company. ISBN 0-316-17662-1.
