= Velma Wayne Dawson =

American puppeteer (1912–2007)

- Born: May 30, 1912; Sydney, Australia
- Died: September 26, 2007 (aged 95); Palm Desert, California, United States
- Occupations: Puppet designer, puppeteer
- Known for: Creating marionettes for TV program Howdy Doody Show
- Spouse: Johnny Dawson

Velma Wayne Dawson (May 30, 1912, Sydney – September 26, 2007) was an American puppet maker and puppeteer. She was best known for creating Howdy Doody marionettes for the Howdy Doody Show.

== Biography ==
Dawson built only two classic Howdy Doody marionettes (Howdy and The Inspector John J. Fedoozle) for the famous children's show that began on December 27, 1947. She began by making all the prototypes with green felt hats, plaid shirts, white neckerchief and tan pants, made of cloth brown boots, brown hair and brown eyes. She continued to build the marionettes until the show went off the air in 1960. She was replaced in June 1952 by Rufus and Margo Rose, who complimented Scott Brinkers' puppet making for the show. Howdy Doody went off the air on September 24, 1960, after 2,343 shows.

Dawson was honored by the National Academy of Television Arts and Sciences (NATAS) Pacific Southwest Chapter for her 50-year-long career in television. Additionally, she was honored with a Golden Palm Star on the Palm Springs Walk of Stars in 2000. She was an active benefactor to College of the Desert in Palm Desert.

Her husband, Johnny Dawson, was a noted amateur golfer who designed and built several noted golf courses.

== Death ==
Dawson died on September 26, 2007, at her home in Palm Desert, California, at the age of 95. She is buried at the Desert Memorial Park in Cathedral City, California.
