= Roy F. Guste =

American author (1951–2021)

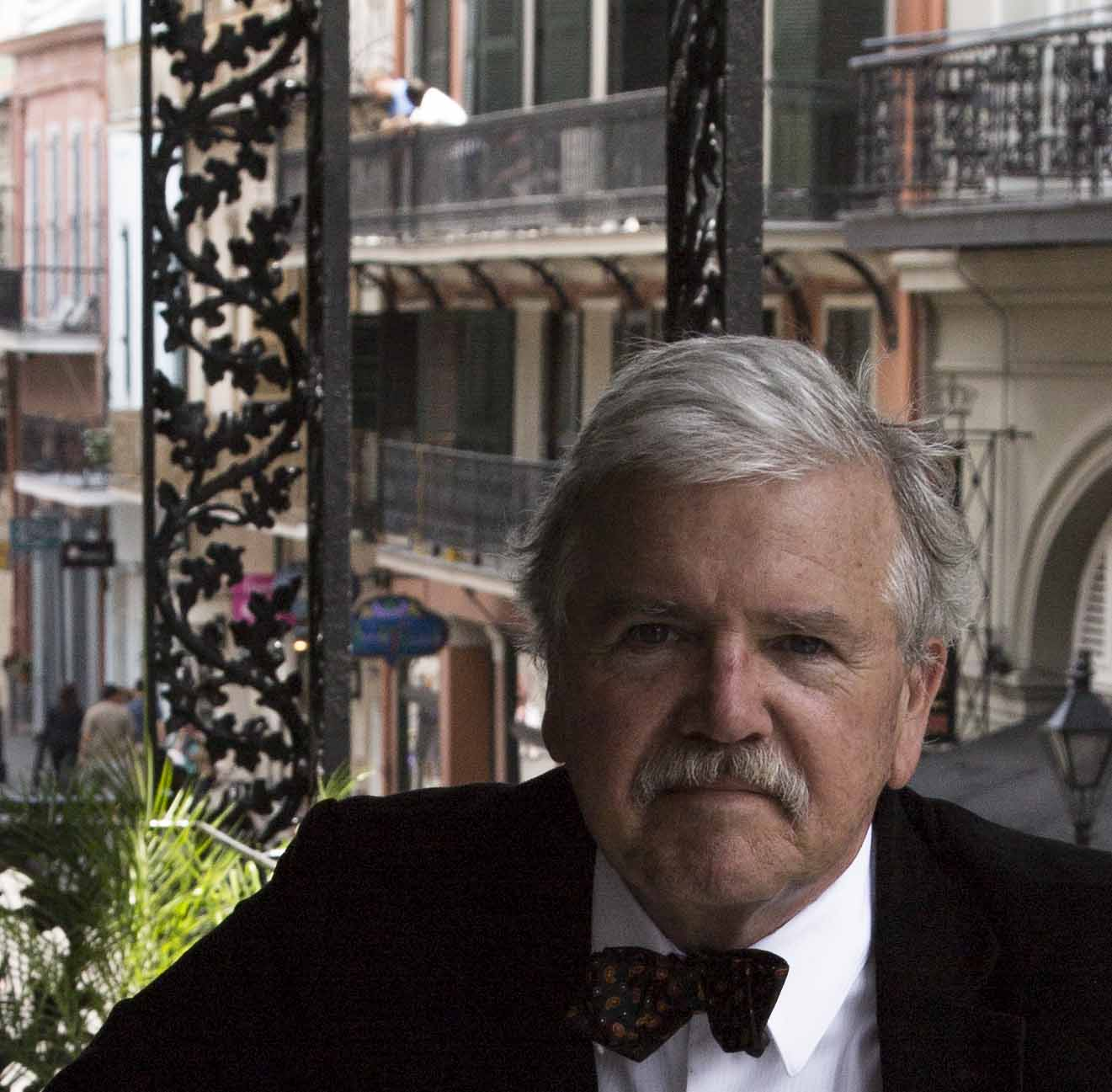
Guste in the French Quarter, 2014

Roy Francis Guste Jr. (7 October 1951 – 9 August 2021) was a New Orleans–based author, photographer, and culinary historian. He wrote 10 Louisiana French-Creole cuisine cookbooks. Guste, a noted Creole historian and resident of the historic French Quarter of New Orleans for more than four decades, grew up in the Garden District, New Orleans and studied at the Le Cordon Bleu.

From 1975 to 1984 he was the proprietor of New Orleans' famed Antoine's Restaurant, established in 1840, making him the fifth generation of the family to hold this position.

== Publications ==
Guste wrote the 1978 Antoine's Restaurant Cookbook, and self-published a new edition in 2015 which covers the history of Antoine's and Creole cuisine in New Orleans.

He is a contributor to the nationally released multi-award-winning book Orléans Embrace with the Secret Gardens of the Vieux Carré, a compendium with TJ Fisher and Louis Sahuc. The commemorative edition garnered double gold at the prestigious PMA Benjamin Franklin Awards 2007 for "The Best New Voice Nonfiction" and "The Bill Fisher Award for Best First Book Nonfiction." The book received 8 national book awards.

== Family ==
Guste's father, Roy F. Guste Sr. (1923–2010) was co-manager of Antoine's. Guste is the nephew of Louisiana's longest-serving Attorney General, William J. Guste.
