= Clarabell the Clown =

Character from The Howdy Doody Show

Clarabell the Clown.

Clarabell the Clown is a character who was part of the main cast on the 1947–1960 series The Howdy Doody Show. Clarabell, a clown who wore a baggy, striped costume, communicated through mime and by honking a horn for "yes" or "no". Clarabell would also spray fellow cast member Buffalo Bob Smith with seltzer.

== Actors ==
Three actors played Clarabell on a regular basis. The first was Bob Keeshan, who later became Captain Kangaroo, and was reputedly fired over a salary dispute in 1952. Dayton Allen, Bill LeCornec, and others played Clarabell in the early years if Keeshan was busy doing something else for the show.

Keeshan was succeeded by Robert "Nick" Nicholson, who also played the character of J. Cornelius Cobb on The Howdy Doody Show.

Lew Anderson was the third and last person to play Clarabell. Anderson played the character from 1954 until the series' final episode on September 24, 1960. Anderson returned to play Clarabell in the short-lived 1976–77 New Howdy Doody Show, the 1987 40th anniversary special, and in later years in many personal appearances with Buffalo Bob Smith.

== Identity ==
Many attempts were made to find out the real face behind Clarabell. In season 2, episode 33 of Happy Days, Richie Cunningham is able to get a candid shot of Clarabell (played by Robert Brunner) without his makeup, but he chooses to destroy it after Buffalo Bob personally asks him to keep the actor's face concealed from the public. (Based upon the period in which Happy Days is set, Lew Anderson would have been portraying Clarabell during that time.)

== Song ==
Buffalo Bob Smith and the Kids of the Peanut Gallery sang a song about Clarabell, sung to the tune of "Mademoiselle from Armentières":

Who's the funniest clown we know?
Clarabell!
Who's the clown on Howdy's show?
Clarabell!
His feet are big, his tummy's stout,
But we could never do without,
Clara, Clara, Clarabell!

Who has fuzzy-wuzzy hair?
Clarabell!
It's partly red but mostly bare.
Clarabell!
And since the day that he was born,
He's honked and honked and honked his horn.
Clara, Clara, Clarabell!

== Final words ==
Throughout the entire series run, Clarabell never spoke, only pantomimed using hand gestures and facial expressions which were understood (and translated to the audience) by Buffalo Bob and the cast. Clarabell's only means of audible communication was a small toy horn he always carried. But during the series finale which aired on September 24, 1960, Clarabell repeatedly pantomimed he had a very big surprise for the viewers. Throughout the special hour-long episode, the rest of the cast tried unsuccessfully to guess Clarabell's surprise; only Mayor Phineas T. Bluster found out, having been told by Clarabell himself as an act of kindness, but then being sworn to secrecy.

It was only in the episode's final moments that Clarabell, still gesturing and using his horn, finally revealed his surprise to Howdy Doody and Buffalo Bob: he could actually speak. Amazed, Bob frantically encouraged Clarabell to prove it then and there as he would never get another chance. His lips quivered as the camera slowly moved in for a close-up on his face; a drum and cymbal roll grew louder and abruptly stopped right before Clarabell quietly said, "Goodbye, kids." A tear could be seen in his right eye as the picture faded to black, and in the ensuing quiet some sobs could be heard in the background before a celesta version of "Auld Lang Syne" gently played over the end credits.
