= Checking Out (play) =

1976 play by Allen Swift

- Written by: Allen Swift
- Characters: Florence Grayson; Bernard Applebaum; Morris Applebaum; Mr. Johnson; Dr. Theodore Applebaum; Dr. Sheldon Henning; Gilbert; Schmuel Axelrod
- Original language: English

Premiere
- Date premiered: 14 September 1976
- Place premiered: Longacre Theatre

Checking Out is a 1976 Broadway play written by Allen Swift. It opened on September 14, 1976, at the Longacre Theatre and closed on September 25, 1976, after 16 performances.

== Original production ==
The show was directed by Jerry Adler, scenery David Jenkins, lighting Ken Billington, costumes Carol Luiken, production stage manager Murray Gitlin, and press by Susan Bloch.

The opening night cast starred Joan Copeland (Florence Grayson), Hy Anzell (Bernard Applebaum), Allen Swift (Morris Applebaum), Jonathan Moore (Mr. Johnson), Mason Adams (Dr. Theodore Applebaum), Larry Bryggman (Dr. Sheldon Henning), Tazewell Thompson (Gilbert), and Michael Gorrin (Schmuel Axelrod).

== Setting ==
Morris Applebaum's apartment on West 57th Street.

Act I

- Scene 1 — An April morning
- Scene 2 — 530 am the next day
- Scene 3 — Four hours later

Act II — A few days later, morning

== Plot ==
An aging Yiddish stage actor decides to schedule and stage-manage his own death.
