= Buffalo Bob Smith =

American television show host (1917–1998)

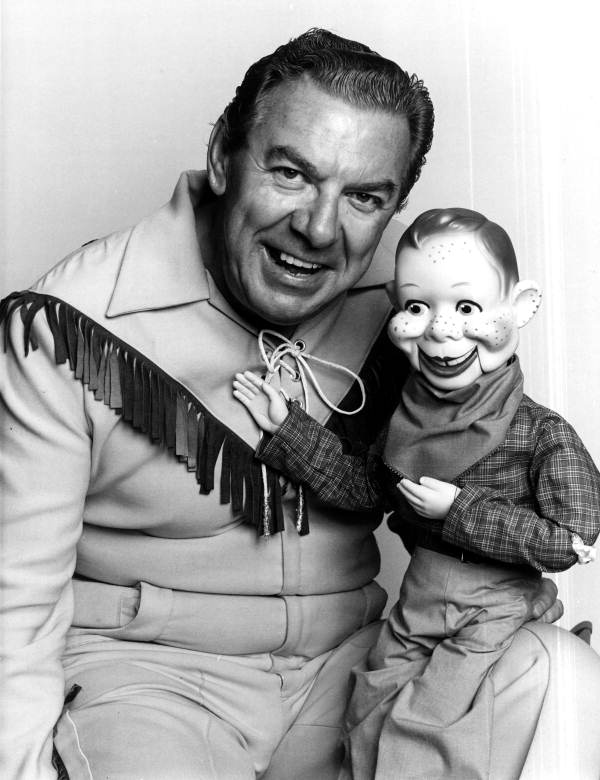
- Buffalo Bob Smith and Howdy Doody in 1972
- Born: Robert Emil Schmidt; November 27, 1917; Buffalo, New York, U.S.
- Died: July 30, 1998 (aged 80); Hendersonville, North Carolina, U.S.
- Burial place: Pinecrest ARP Church
- Occupations: Television personality; host
- Years active: 1943–1991
- Spouse: Mildred Metz (m. 1940)
- Children: 3

Robert Emil Schmidt (November 27, 1917 – July 30, 1998), nicknamed Buffalo Bob, was an American radio and television personality and presenter; he was well known as the host of the children's show Howdy Doody.

== Biography ==
=== Early life and radio ===
Smith was born in Buffalo, New York, as Robert Emil Schmidt. He attended Masten Park High School.

Schmidt got his start in radio in Buffalo at WGR (AM), though he switched from WGR to WBEN's late morning radio slot in 1943 as part of a move which brought Clint Buehlman's popular early morning show from WGR to WBEN at the same time. (The WBEN morning slot had opened when its host, future NBC-TV personality Jack Paar, was drafted into the military.)

WBEN was seeking to break WGR's #1 position in local popularity; shaking the position of network-fed Don McNeill's Breakfast Club and its grip on ratings for the 9 a.m. time slot was an important part of the plan. WBEN first poached Clint Buehlman's morning show, which ended at 9 a.m., followed by 15 minutes of local news. Then Buffalo Bob appeared at 9:15 a.m. Eventually, Smith won the #1 spot in late mornings for WBEN, and McNeill dropped to second in the Buffalo market. Smith's popularity in Buffalo earned the attention of NBC, which brought him to New York after the war to host early mornings on flagship station WNBC. He held this post through the early 1950s before concentrating on television. For a time between 1947 and 1953, he appeared mornings on WNBC while hosting and producing the daily Howdy Doody show.

== The Howdy Doody show ==
Smith first performed the character on his WNBC radio show. When the show transitioned to TV (1947–1960), puppet builder Frank Paris created a marionette to match the voice. In 1948, a dispute over merchandising rights led Frank Paris to leave the show and take the original puppet with him. Velma Dawson created this new style of Howdy Doody puppet that debuted on June 8, 1948 after a break for "plastic surgery". Throughout the series run on NBC, Bob Smith voiced the puppet, usually through recordings made before the show, while Margo and Rufus Rose were primarily responsible for building, maintaining, and performing the marionettes. Smith was also known as a singer and musician, appearing on many top shows of the time both before and after becoming nationally known for the Howdy Doody show. In 1954, Smith suffered a heart attack and as a result, performed the show from a studio built in the basement of his home in New Rochelle, New York. He returned to the NBC studio in 1955. The final NBC Howdy Doody episode aired in 1960. Later, in 1976, Smith reunited with longtime show producer E. Roger Muir and several of the original cast to produce a new daily syndicated Howdy Doody show.

David Marc describes a show:

Smith who built it into an enduring hit and one of television's first profitable franchises for licensed product tie-ins. Whereas other 1950s children's series were appreciated by adults for their tender wit—such as Burr Tillstrom's puppet show Kukla, Fran and Ollie—or were presented for educational value—such as Ask Mr. Wizard, a science show—the Howdy Doody Show was strictly aimed at pleasing children, which it did to dizzying excess. With an audience of screaming kids filling the "Peanut Gallery" onstage to energize the millions watching at home, Buffalo Bob in cowboy buckskins opened each show by shouting out the signature question, "Hey kids, what time is it?" The verbal response by the audience, "It's Howdy Doody Time!" cued a rousing theme song, which inspired salty parodies in schoolyards across the country. The energy and decibel levels of the show were kept high throughout. When not taking a pratfall—sometimes on an actual banana peel—Smith was the target of Clarabell's high-pressure seltzer bottle. The show was particularly effective in its relentless use of words and nonsense syllables designed to drive children giddy with laughter. Flub-a-Dub, for instance, was a fantasy animal character which could survive only by eating meatballs. Such songs as "Ooga Booga Rocka Shmooga" and "Iggly Wiggly Spaghetti" sent the Peanut Gallery into paroxysms of laughter.

== After Howdy Doody ==
In 1970 and 1971, Smith embarked on a live tour of college campuses. The shows, organized by producer Burt DuBrow, mixed nostalgia with more contemporary humor, such as Buffalo Bob finding a package of Zig Zags (rolling paper) allegedly belonging to Clarabell. One show, on April 4, 1971, was recorded and released as an LP, on the Project 3 Total Sound Stereo label. It was titled Buffalo Bob Smith Live at Bill Graham's Fillmore East.

Smith had a summer residence in Grand Lake Stream, Maine. He was well-liked by locals and occasionally hosted local events. He owned radio stations WQDY in Calais, Maine, WMKR (now WSYY) in Millinocket, Maine and WHOU in Houlton, Maine.

== Later life ==
His other screen efforts include films Track of Thunder (1968) and Problem Child 2 (1991), as Father Flanagan. He also made guest appearances on Happy Days and What's My Line, as well as the TV specials NBC's 60th Anniversary Celebration (1986) and It's Howdy Doody Time (1987). After his retirement, Smith moved to Henderson County, North Carolina, becoming a member of the Pinecrest Associate Reformed Presbyterian Church (ARP) in Flat Rock.

== Death ==
On July 3, 1998, Smith made a live infomercial on QVC to promote Howdy Doody Entertainment Memorabilia; this was his last public appearance. Smith died of lung cancer four weeks later on July 30 in a hospital in Hendersonville, North Carolina, three days before puppeteer Shari Lewis, whose show coincidentally had taken over the time slot which Howdy Doody had previously occupied.
