= Three's a Crowd (game show) =

American television series

- Also known as: All-New 3's a Crowd
- Created by: Chuck Barris
- Directed by: John Dorsey
- Presented by: Jim Peck; Alan Thicke
- Announcer: Johnny Jacobs; Randy West
- Theme music composer: Lee Ringuette; John Nordstrom II
- Country of origin: United States

Production
- Producer: David M. Greenfield
- Running time: approx. 22–26 minutes
- Production companies: Chuck Barris Productions (1979–1980); The Gurin Company (1999–2000); Game Show Network Originals (1999–2000)

Original release
- Network: Syndication
- Release: September 17, 1979 – February 1, 1980
- Network: GSN
- Release: November 29, 1999 – April 2000

Three's a Crowd (sometimes spelled 3's a Crowd) is an American television game show. It was created by Chuck Barris and originally packaged by Chuck Barris Productions.

The first version aired in syndication from September 17, 1979, to February 1, 1980, hosted by Jim Peck. The show featured a host asking questions of a man, then his wife and secretary, to determine which of the latter two knew him better. The show was met with negative reception for its format, leading to the demise of both it and other shows created by Barris.

A revival for Game Show Network, titled The All-New 3's a Crowd, aired on Game Show Network between 1999 and 2000. Hosted by Alan Thicke, this version featured a friend or family member instead of a secretary.

== Syndicated version ==
The original version of the show aired in first-run syndication starting in 1979. Hosted by Jim Peck, with Johnny Jacobs as announcer, it bore many similarities to Barris' The Newlywed Game. The show featured three teams, each composed of male contestants, their wives, and their secretaries. The game started with the men answering three pointed questions, usually referencing their wives and secretaries in ways that would lead to potential marital discord.

The secretaries then were brought back to answer the same questions, followed by the wives. Whichever team — wives or secretaries — matched the men's answers more often equally split a $1,000 prize (if the teams were tied, all parties split $500). The men received an announced prize for their participation.

=== Broadcast history ===
According to Barris in his first autobiography, The Game Show King, the protests against the show—as well as the sometimes-evident lack of fun the contestants seemed to be having on it—prompted him to retreat from television production entirely.

At the time, Barris's company had four other shows on the air: revivals of both The Dating Game and The Newlywed Game, the still-running syndicated The Gong Show, and its spin-off The $1.98 Beauty Show. Barris wrote that "The public backlash from Three's a Crowd not only caused the program to be canceled, but it took three other TV shows of mine with it. I went to my house in Malibu and stayed there for a year." Indeed, it was largely due to the backlash from Three's a Crowd that ratings for all of his other shows—including the still-popular The Gong Show—declined and were removed from the air by the start of the next television season.

The series was replaced on February 4, 1980, by a revival of the 1960s game show Camouflage, also produced by Barris. Unlike its predecessor, Camouflage was a weekly series – something that worked against it, as the weekly syndicated game show had largely gone by the wayside in favor of daily "strips" (the only other game shows not produced by Barris at this time that were still airing weekly were The Nighttime Price Is Right, which was wrapping up its final season, Match Game PM and Joker! Joker! Joker!, both of which ran until 1981). Three's a Crowd was the last original format Barris tried; the rest of his productions were either revivals of old shows (as Camouflage and a second Barris revival of Treasure Hunt were) or his previous efforts (The Dating Game, The Newlywed Game, and The Gong Show were all revived during the 1980s).

Barris would spend the next several years at home, where he would use his spare time to write a mock biography, Confessions of a Dangerous Mind, in which Barris imagined himself as an assassin for the Central Intelligence Agency during his game show career (Barris had applied for work with the CIA but abandoned that career path before entering when he broke into television). Confessions of a Dangerous Mind would later be adapted into a 2002 film of the same name.

== GSN version ==
This version was hosted by Alan Thicke. The wives-secretaries pairings were replaced by pairings such as girlfriend-best friend, girlfriend-mother and such. Just as often, a woman would be the central subject with the pairings altered appropriately.

=== Round 1 ===
As in the original, the middle people were asked three questions about their significant others. The significant others were asked the same questions when they returned altogether. Each time they or either one match, they get 5 points.

=== Round 2 ===
The tables were turned as the significant others were asked three questions about their mate. The middle people were asked the same questions when they returned altogether. Each time either one or both significant others match, they get 10 points.

=== Round 3: Fast Match Round ===
Each middle person was given four words/phrases that may or may not relate to them. They must answer with one of three possible choices such as, "Be There", "Wouldn't Dare", "No Fair"; "I Win", "I Lose", "It's a Draw" etc. (so, in other words, choice A would be a "Yes" answer, choice B would be a "No" answer, and choice C would be a "Maybe" answer) Before they answer, each significant other must lock in their predictions to how their mates will answer. Once again each match is worth 10 points. For a possible grand total of 85 points.

Originally, the middle person makes the choice of an answer after locking in their answer; in Season 2 the person now holds the card (like in the first round) to show the answer after they locked it in.

Unlike the original, the significant others do not work as a team. The significant other with the most points at show's end won $1,000; sudden-death was played if there was a tie. The central characters, as before, received an unannounced prize for participating.

== Critical reception ==
In his book What Were They Thinking?: The 100 Dumbest Events in Television History, David Hofstede ranks the show at number 94. He wrote that it "offered the chance to watch a marriage dissolve on camera years before Jerry Springer", and noted that it received backlash from the United Auto Workers (UAW) and National Organization for Women (NOW).
