= Barris Industries =

Former American game show production company

- Formerly: Chuck Barris Productions (1965–1981)
- Type: Public
- Industry: Television
- Founded: June 14, 1965; 61 years ago
- Founder: Chuck Barris
- Defunct: November 4, 1990
- Fate: Merged into The Guber-Peters Entertainment Company
- Successor: The Guber-Peters Entertainment Company; Columbia Pictures Television
- Headquarters: Los Angeles, California, United States
- Key people: Chuck Barris; Bud Granoff; Burt Sugarman
- Products: Game shows
- Divisions: Chuck Barris Creations; Chuck Barris Projects; Chuck Barris Enterprises; Chuck Barris Game Shows; Barris Program Sales; Barris Advertising Sales

Barris Industries, Inc. was an American game show production company that was founded by Chuck Barris.

== History ==
Barris founded his company on June 14, 1965 as Chuck Barris Productions, after a stint at ABC daytime in the West Coast where he developed The Rebus Game, using the naming convention he used for future Barris game shows. The company's first series was an unsold pilot called People Pickers. Its first successful program was The Dating Game; after a successful run on daytime, it was expanded to a more well-known primetime version which was also successful in the ratings; it was known for producing other hit game shows such as The Newlywed Game and The Gong Show. The latter title eventually became a movie released by Universal Pictures in 1980. Barris later expanded in 1966 to produce more product exclusively for ABC, such as the game show Dream Girl of '67, The Family Game and How's Your Mother-in-Law?, which was unsuccessful in the ratings.

Chuck Barris Productions was incorporated on October 2, 1968. It had its first game show in syndication in 1969, the short-lived The Game Game (credited as Chuck Barris Games Shows, Inc. [sic]), with CBS Enterprises as distributor. In 1971, the company decided to capitalize on the upcoming rules of Prime Time Access Rule, by creating and developing new projects, such as the unsold pilot intended for CBS, Cop-Out!, and a talk show, and attempted to revive Dream Girl for Viacom. In 1972, the company formed a partnership with Sandy Frank for development of first-run game shows, with The Parent Game the first one to come out of the deal. In 1973, the company had a distribution deal with Worldvision Enterprises to syndicate The Dating Game, but less than a month later, the company bought back the syndication rights to The Dating Game from Worldvision Enterprises, who started syndicating The Newlywed Game once its ABC network run was finished, and then subsequently assigned the rights of The Dating Game to Rhodes Productions.

In 1976, the company formed a partnership with Firestone Program Syndication Company, run by Len Firestone, to syndicate the weekly nighttime version of The Gong Show. Around the same time, the company sold a daytime version of The Gong Show for NBC, but it only lasted two years, making it the last ever network show Barris had ever made as all future works had been in syndication. The success led Barris to revive production on two of its popular game shows The Newlywed Game and The Dating Game. In 1980, Barris stopped production on all of his shows due to an oversaturation in game and talk show strips, only for a return in 1981 with a revival of Treasure Hunt for Firestone Program Syndication Company, stopping again in 1982. In 1981, Barris renamed Chuck Barris Productions, Inc. as Barris Industries, Inc.

After spending some time in Europe, Chuck Barris returned to the United States in 1984 and formed a syndication arm called Bel-Air Program Sales in October along with Bob Cohen and Brian Firestone, which began syndicating The Dating Game, The Newlywed Game, The Gong Show, The $1.98 Beauty Show and the Barris versions of Treasure Hunt. Barris resumed production on new shows with production of The New Newlywed Game. In 1985, Barris Industries formed an ad-sales barter called Clarion Communications. Later in 1986, Bel-Air Program Sales was renamed as Barris Program Sales, Clarion Communications was renamed as Barris Advertising Sales (a.k.a. Barris National Advertisers), and the production arm Chuck Barris Productions was renamed as Barris Productions. In 1986, Barris Industries filed a $5 million copyright lawsuit against Lorimar-Telepictures, claiming that the game show Perfect Match was too similar to The Newlywed Game. On March 25, 1987, Barris resigned, left the company, and in the process, sold his shares to Burt Sugarman.

Barris Industries, under the leadership of Burt Sugarman and his company Giant Group Ltd., originally owned a 5.27% stake in Reeves Entertainment Group. In January 1988, Barris Industries merged with the Guber-Peters Company to form Barris/Guber-Peters. On March 31, 1989, Burt Sugarman sold his shares of Barris Industries to Westfield Group and Northern Star Holdings Ltd., the owners of Network Ten of Australia owned by Frank Lowy for $34.5 million. The company stopped production of all of its game show properties in mid 1989. In June 1, 1989, Barris filed a lawsuit against Worldvision Enterprises, claiming it held syndication rights of The Newlywed Game, claiming Worldvision held 30% of its profits. On September 7, 1989, Barris Industries was renamed as the Guber-Peters Entertainment Company, Barris Program Sales was renamed as Guber-Peters Program Sales, and Barris Advertising Sales was renamed as Guber-Peters Advertising Sales. On September 29, 1989, a day after Sony Corporation of Japan announced to acquire Columbia Pictures Entertainment, Sony announced to acquire the Guber-Peters Entertainment Company for $200 million. The sale was completed on November 9, 1989 after Sony's acquisition of Columbia Pictures Entertainment a day earlier. The company did make a brief comeback to game shows with Quiz Kids Challenge in 1990, but it was cancelled due to oversaturation. On November 5, 1990, CPE folded its first-run syndication unit Guber-Peters Television into Columbia Pictures Television Distribution.

As of 2014, all of the Barris game shows are owned and distributed by Sony Pictures Television, while the Guber-Peters Entertainment Company is still an active in-name-only unit of SPT and Columbia Pictures, known as GPEC, Inc.

== List of notable programs ==
As Barris Industries:

- People Pickers (1965 unsold pilot)
- The Dating Game (1965–1974, 1978–1980, 1986-1989 (as The All-New Dating Game))
- Dream Girl of '67 (1966-1967 and 1986-1987 (as Dream Girl USA))
- The Newlywed Game (1966-1974, 1977-1980, 1985-1989)
- The Family Game (1967 and 1986 unsold pilot)
- How's Your Mother-in-Law? (1967-1968)
- The Game Game (1969)
- Cop Out (1972 unsold pilot)
- The Parent Game (1972-1973)
- Treasure Hunt (1973-1977 and 1981-1982)
- The Bobby Vinton Show (1975-1978)
- The Gong Show (1976–1980 and 1988–1989)
- The $1.98 Beauty Show (1978-1980)
- 3's a Crowd (1979-1980)
- Camouflage (1980)
- Dollar a Second (1981 unsold pilot)
- Bamboozle (1986 unsold pilot)
- Comedy Courtroom (1986 unsold pilot)

As Guber-Peters Television:

- Quiz Kids Challenge (1990)
- Countdown (1990 unsold pilot)

== Known employees ==
The longtime announcer for Chuck Barris Productions was Johnny Jacobs, who served from 1965 until his death in 1982. Jacobs announced for such Barris game shows as The Dating Game, The Newlywed Game, Treasure Hunt, and The Gong Show. Tony McClay is Barris' secondary announcer, as he was sub for Jacobs, most often in 1980 and 1982.

Another announcer was Wheel of Fortune's Charlie O'Donnell, who from 1986 to 1989 announced for The New Newlywed Game, The All New Dating Game, and the 1988 version of The Gong Show, until those incarnations ended in 1989 and he went back to Wheel of Fortune in March. O'Donnell also served as an announcer for Barry & Enright Productions. A lesser known announcer was Bob Hilton, who was announcer from 1985 to 1987, announcing The New Newlywed Game and The All New Dating Game. Yet another of these announcers were Johnny Gilbert and Charlie Tuna, who were the announcers on the successor production Quiz Kids Challenge.

Perhaps the best-known employee was The New Newlywed Game host Bob Eubanks, who served from 1966 to 1974, 1977 to 1980, and 1985 to 1988, when he stepped down and was replaced by Paul Rodriguez. Eubanks returned to host The Newlywed Game from 1997 to 1999.

Another prominent employee was comedian Chris Bearde, who co-created and co-produced The Gong Show in both '70s and '80s versions.

Mark Huffnail was in charge of production for Barris from 1987 to 1989.

== Other companies include ==
- Chuck Barris Projects
- Chuck Barris Enterprises
- Barris Program Sales
- Barris Advertising Sales
