= The Big Question =

The Big Question may refer to:

- The Big Question (comics), a.k.a. Enigma Fisk, a fictional character in Amalgam Comics
- The Big Question (TV series), a five-part television series exploring the evolution of the universe and life, broadcast on Channel 5 in 2004 and 2005
- The Big Question (novel), a 2007 novel by Chuck Barris

== See also ==
- The Big Questions, a panel discussion TV series on faith and ethics broadcast on the UK's BBC One starting in September 2007
