= The Parent Game =

- Created by: Chuck Barris; Barry Abel; Gary Jonke
- Presented by: Clark Race
- Announcer: Johnny Jacobs
- Country of origin: United States

Production
- Running time: 30 Minutes
- Production company: Chuck Barris Productions

Original release
- Network: Syndicated (weekly)
- Release: September 4, 1972 – September 1973

The Parent Game is an American game show that ran in syndication from 1972 to 1973. The show was hosted by Clark Race, a Los Angeles radio personality, with Johnny Jacobs as the announcer (although Charlie O'Donnell handled these duties on the first two episodes). The answers were commented by child psychologist Dorothy Thompson, who did not appear in-studio.

The series was produced by Chuck Barris Productions. The show's theme song would later be used as a cue on the syndicated versions of Barris-produced The Newlywed Game, The Dating Game, and The New Treasure Hunt.

== Gameplay ==
The format was very similar to The Newlywed Game, the difference between Newlywed and this show being that Race would ask three couples a series of multiple-choice questions about their children. Their job was to match answers with a resident child psychologist.

The first four questions allowed all six players to give individual answers, but on the fifth and final question each couple had to agree on one answer.

=== Scoring ===
For the first two questions, a correct response earned five points per teammate. Ten points were awarded per correct answer in the third question, and 15 points each in the fourth question. The final question was worth 30 points.

The couple with the most points won the game and a grand prize. If there was a tie, the Newlywed Game tiebreaker was used.

== Revival ==
A revival, entitled Wait 'til You Have Kids hosted by Tom Parks and produced by co-creator Gary Jonke and Jay Wolpert Productions and MTM Entertainment, aired on The Family Channel from September 30, 1996 – January 30, 1997.

== Episode status ==
At least 23 episodes are known to exist, having aired on GSN as part of their Kids' Zone block from 1997 to 1999.
