= Rip Taylor =

American actor and comedian (1931–2019)

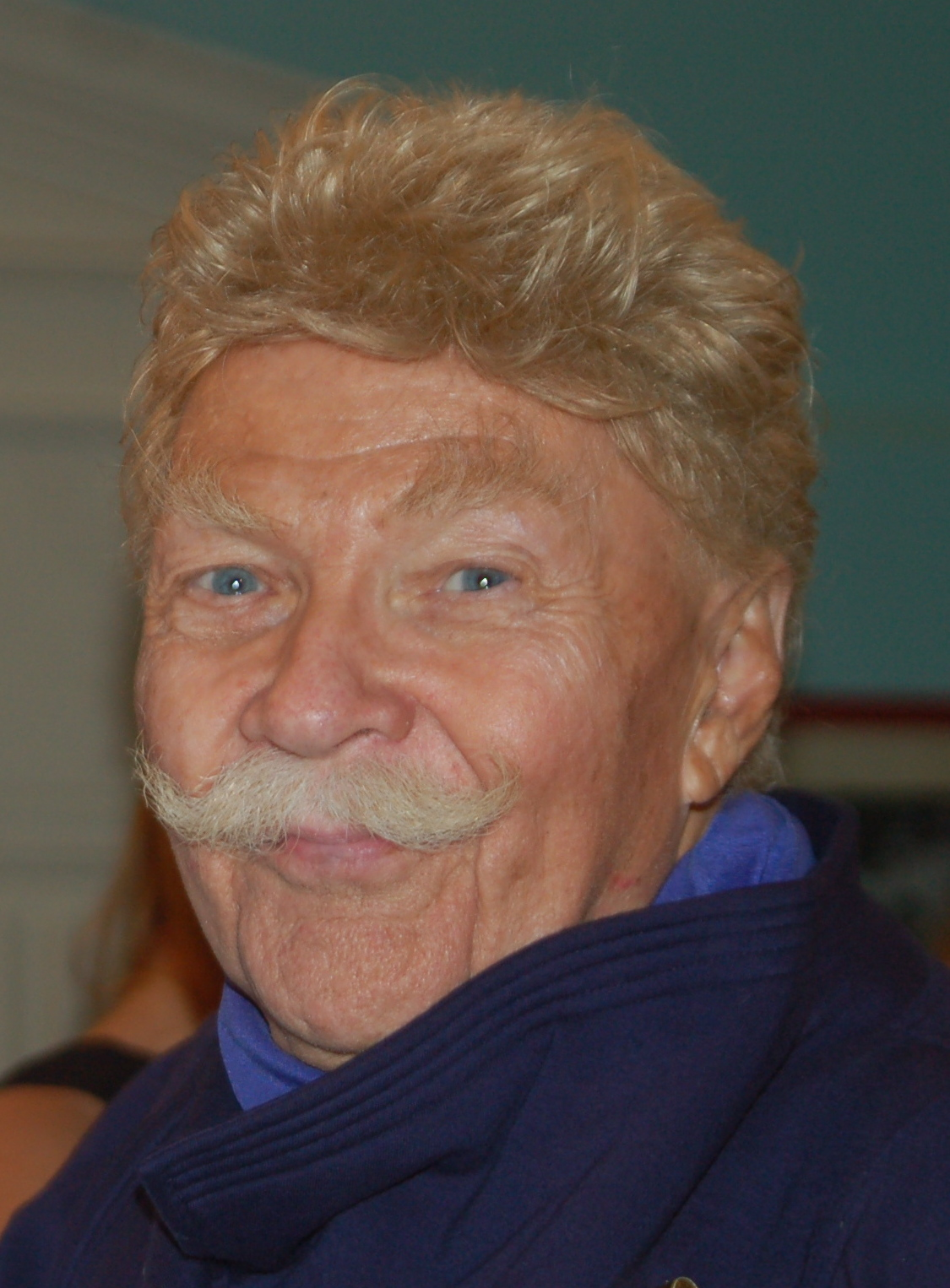
- Rip Taylor in 2010
- Born: Charles Elmer Taylor Jr. January 13, 1931; Washington, D.C., U.S.
- Died: October 6, 2019 (aged 88); Los Angeles, California, U.S.
- Other name: Charles E. Taylor
- Occupations: Actor; comedian
- Years active: 1950s–2019
- Spouse: Rusty Rowe (div.)
- Partner: Robert Fortney

Charles Elmer "Rip" Taylor Jr. (January 13, 1931 – October 6, 2019) was an American actor and comedian, known for his exuberance and flamboyant personality, including his wild moustache, toupee, and his habit of showering himself (and others) with confetti. The Hollywood Reporter called him "a television and nightclub mainstay for more than six decades" who made thousands of nightclub and television appearances.

== Early life ==
Charles Elmer Taylor Jr. was born in Washington, D.C., on January 13, 1931, the son of Elizabeth Sue Evans (1911–2000), a waitress and former government clerk, and Charles Elmer Taylor (died 1933), a musician. His father died when he was two years old. As described in his 2010 one-man show It Ain't All Confetti, Taylor had a tough childhood, which included being molested while in foster care and dealing with bullies in school. As a teenager he attended Capitol Page School. Taylor worked as a congressional page before serving in the Korean War; he was in the U.S. Army Signal Corps. Although assigned to the Corps, he was sent to Special Services, the entertainment wing of the military, where he performed for the troops in Tokyo and Korea.

== Career ==
=== Early career ===
Taylor's career in show business began when he joined the U.S. Army, where he started performing stand-up in clubs and restaurants abroad while also performing for the troops. After his military service, and back in the U.S., he focused on a nightclub career. His mainstay material was "pantomiming records"; his favorites were Yiddish folk songs and Spike Jones tunes. He said that ended one day when the record player broke, "I haven't shut up since." In the mid-1950s he worked the strip clubs all along the Eastern coast of the U.S. Although much of his material included jokes stolen from acts he saw in USO shows, his first signature piece would be to pretend to cry while begging the audience for laughs. He found he could get a bigger response that way.

As he got more upscale bookings, he played at winter resorts in Miami Beach, Florida, and in the summer resorts in Catskill Mountains. Taylor first appeared on The Ed Sullivan Show in 1961 and made about twenty subsequent appearances. Sullivan would forget his name, saying "Get me the crying comedian."

=== Television and film ===
In addition to the Ed Sullivan Show, Taylor appeared on The Jackie Gleason Show in several guest appearances during the 1963–1964 season as "the crying comedian". Taylor's signature confetti tossing gag came from an appearance in the 1960s The Merv Griffin Show where he was bombing as a stand-up comedian. "I did props and I was 'The Prop comedian.' I was dying like hell on Merv Griffin's show. The jokes were dumb, and I tore the five by eight cards, threw them up in the air and it became confetti," he recalled. "I knocked over his desk, walked up the aisle, went to Sardi's and said, 'Well, that's the end of my television career.' I went home that night. Their switchboard had lit up. They said, 'Get the guy that went crazy!'"

Taylor became somewhat of a fixture in Las Vegas. He was the opener for Eleanor Powell's dance-focused revue, and would go on to warm up audiences for headliners Frank Sinatra, Sammy Davis Jr., Ann-Margret, Debbie Reynolds, Frankie Laine, Judy Garland, and The Kingston Trio. In the 1970s he won Las Vegas Entertainer of the Year three times.

He appeared in two 1968 episodes of The Monkees as well as having a cameo in their 1969 special 33 1/3 Revolutions per Monkee. He continued to work as a voice performer in the 1970s cartoon series Here Comes the Grump as the title character, and in the second edition of The Addams Family cartoon series in 1992 as the voice of Uncle Fester.

Throughout the 1970s, Taylor was a frequent celebrity guest panelist on television game shows such as Hollywood Squares, To Tell the Truth, and The Gong Show, and substituted for Charles Nelson Reilly on Match Game. He became a regular on Sid and Marty Krofft's Sigmund and the Sea Monsters, playing Sheldon, a sea-genie who lived in a conch shell. In addition, Taylor was also a regular on The Brady Bunch Hour, playing the role of neighbor/performer Jack Merrill. He also hosted a short-lived send-up of beauty pageants titled The $1.98 Beauty Show, created by Chuck Barris, producer/host of The Gong Show, in 1978. Taylor appeared as a celebrity on the 1990 version of Match Game. In 1979, he was the voice of C.J. from the Hanna-Barbera television movie Scooby Goes Hollywood. Taylor's other appearances also include The Kids in the Hall, where he was referred to as Uncle Rip by Buddy Cole, the show's most flamboyantly gay character. He also appeared as himself in the movie Wayne's World 2, one of the special guests invited to "WayneStock" after being visited in a dream by Jim Morrison. Taylor made "dozens of mayhem-filled appearances" on both The Tonight Show and The Mike Douglas Show.

In 1990, he voiced the genie in DuckTales the Movie: Treasure of the Lost Lamp. Taylor appeared uncredited on a December 1994 edition of WWF Monday Night Raw. He assisted another wrestler and they pushed Jeff Jarrett.

In 1997, Taylor appeared in a segment on the show Beyond Belief: Fact or Fiction. He played the role of Elmo Middleton in the segment "The Man in the Model T". Also in 1997, he appeared as himself on the sitcom Brotherly Love in the episode "Easy Come Easy Go". He also portrayed Chief Undersecretary Wartle in the graphical adventure game Zork: Grand Inquisitor in 1997. In 2003, Taylor also appeared as himself on Will & Grace. In 2005, he appeared as himself on an episode of George Lopez. Taylor guest-starred as chef "Rappin' Rip" in four episodes of Life with Bonnie. He guest starred in The Suite Life of Zack & Cody episode "Loosely Ballroom" as Leo. He is also in some episodes of The Emperor's New School as the voice of the Royal Record Keeper. He was also in the Jetix animated series Super Robot Monkey Team Hyperforce Go!. He made a special guest appearance at the end of the 1,000th episode of G4's video game review show X-Play. He made a guest appearance on a 2012 episode of The Aquabats! Super Show!, where he played a genie reminiscent of his character on Sigmund and the Sea Monsters.

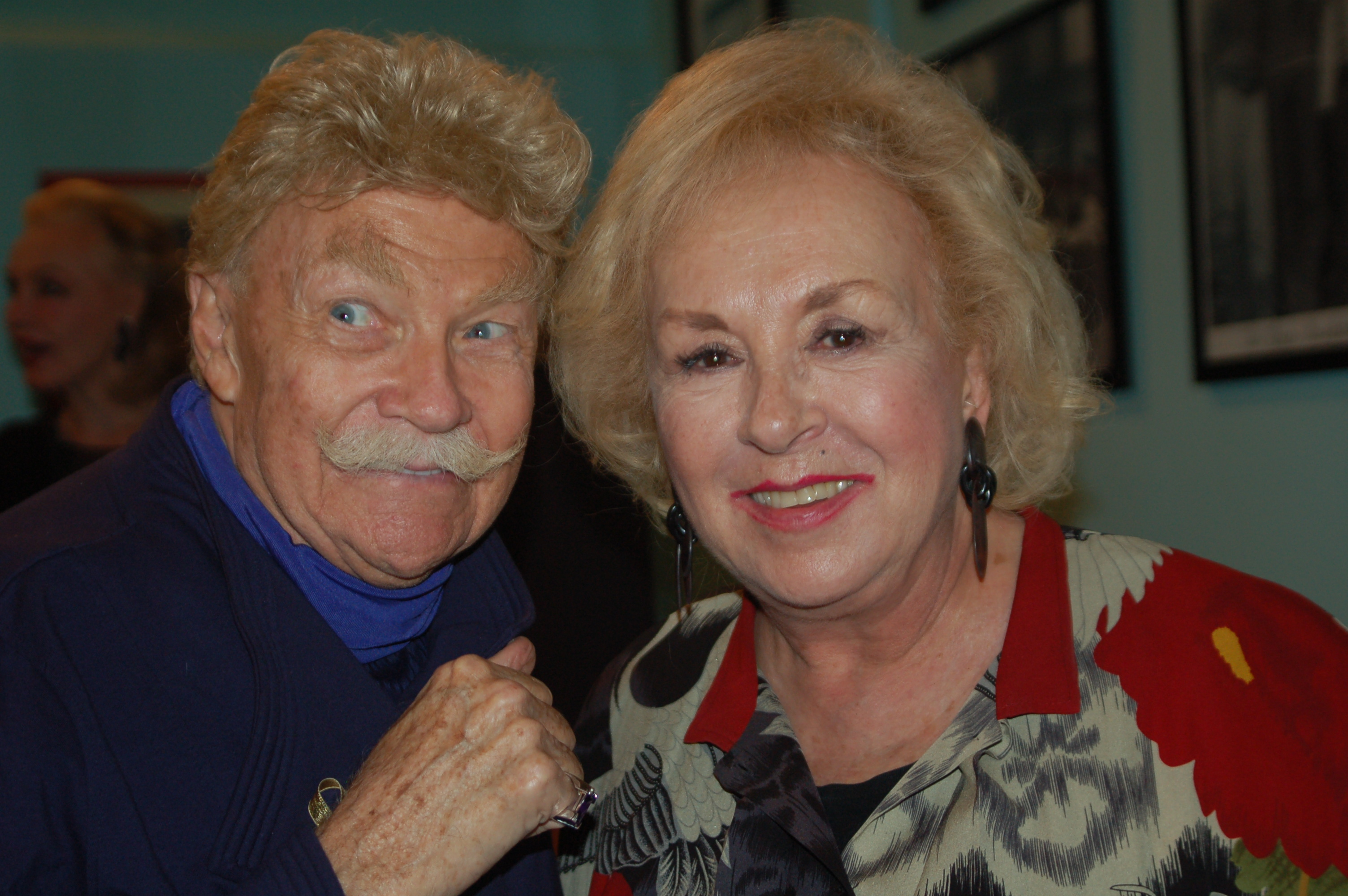
Taylor with actress Doris Roberts in 2010

In 1995, Taylor performed the intro for the Bloodhound Gang's Use Your Fingers album. In the early 2000s, Johnny Knoxville asked Taylor to be in the film Jackass: The Movie (2002) and in the final scene, he wielded a pistol that, when fired, released a sign that read "The End." (Note: Taylor's section of the film Jackass: The Movie was originally considerably longer, and ended with him complaining about the heat, and fanning himself with his toupée. This footage was included on the DVD of the film.) He did the same thing at the ending of Jackass Number Two, and Jackass 3D. In the credits of the 2005 remake of The Dukes of Hazzard, Taylor appears in the blooper reel.

Taylor made occasional appearances in movies, usually in broad comedies like The Happy Hooker Goes to Washington (1977) and the R-rated Deep Throat parody Chatterbox (1977). In Cheech & Chong's Things Are Tough All Over (1982), he picks them up in the middle of nowhere driving a convertible full of props. He then proceeds to drive them to Las Vegas and telling jokes the whole way and moving Chong to tears from laughter (and, later, tears because he won't stop). In Amazon Women on the Moon (1987) a funeral service turns into a celebrity roast when guest Rip Taylor shows up to "honor" the deceased. In 1992, Taylor voiced Captain Kiddie in Tom and Jerry: The Movie. In 1993's Indecent Proposal, he appeared as Demi Moore's boss, Mr. Langford.

=== Live theatre ===
In 1981, Taylor appeared on Broadway when he replaced Mickey Rooney in the burlesque-themed musical comedy Sugar Babies. He was a frequent co-star with Debbie Reynolds in her live shows in Las Vegas; Reno, Nevada; and Lake Tahoe. Taylor performed frequently in Atlantic City as well. In 2010, he appeared in the one-man show It Ain't All Confetti in North Hollywood, where he shared personal stories about his life and career.

== Personal life and death ==
In 2005, Taylor appeared as the grand marshal of the Washington, D.C., Capital Pride parade. When Taylor had been referred to as "openly gay" in a 2009 interview for "Ask the Flying Monkey", Brent Hartinger recalled receiving an email from Taylor stating, "You don’t know me to summarize that I am openly gay. I don’t know that you’re not an openly heroin user. You see how that works? Think before you write." Taylor was married for a number of years to Las Vegas showgirl Rusty Rowe, whom he divorced in the early 1960s.

Taylor was a close friend of entertainer Liberace. Taylor cut the ribbon at the Las Vegas estate auction of Liberace's belongings and personal effects in 1988.

According to his publicist, at the time of Taylor's death he was in a long-term relationship with Robert Fortney.

Taylor died on October 6, 2019, at Cedars-Sinai Medical Center in Los Angeles, having been hospitalized for a seizure the week prior. His death certificate listed heart failure as a contributing cause. While Taylor often gave his birth year as 1934 or 1935, his death certificate and census records confirm he was born in 1931. His ashes were scattered at sea in Hawaii.

== Filmography ==
=== Television ===
Year	Title	Roles	Notes
1967	The Monkees	Manager	S2:E14, "Monkees on the Wheel"
1968	The Monkees	Glick	S2:E26, "Mijacogeo"
1969–1970	Here Comes the Grump	The Grump	34 episodes
1973–1975	Sigmund and the Sea Monsters	Sheldon The Sea Genie	13 episodes
1977	The Brady Bunch Hour	Jack Merrill	8 episodes
1978–1980	The $1.98 Beauty Show	MC	78 episodes
1984–1987	Down to Earth	Stanley McCloud	
1992–1993	The Addams Family	Uncle Fester	21 episodes
1993	Bonkers	Wacky Weasel	S4:E11, "Get Wacky"
2002–2003	Whatever Happened to... Robot Jones?	Mr. McMcMc, Guy in Car	7 episodes
2004	Will & Grace	Himself	S7:E9, "Saving Grace, Again: Part 2"
2005	The Life and Times of Juniper Lee	Horrifying Monster	S1:E4, "New Trickster in Town"
2005	George Lopez	Himself	S4:E17, "George Buys a Vow"
2006	The Suite Life of Zack & Cody	Leo	S2:E25, "Loosely Ballroom"
2006–2008	The Emperor's New School	The Royal Judge	17 episodes
2010	Kathy Griffin: My Life on the D-List	Himself	S6:E8, "Maggie, the Musical"

=== Film ===
Year	Title	Role	Notes
1980	The Gong Show Movie	Restaurant Maitre d'	
1982	Things Are Tough All Over	Himself	
1987	Amazon Women on the Moon	Himself	
1990	DuckTales the Movie: Treasure of the Lost Lamp	Genie	Voice
1992	Home Alone 2: Lost in New York	Celeb #2	
1992	Tom and Jerry: The Movie	Captain Kiddie	Voice
1993	Indecent Proposal	Mr. Langford	
1993	Wayne's World 2	Himself	
1994	The Silence of the Hams	Mr. Laurel	
2002	Jackass: The Movie	Himself	Guest appearance
2005	The Dukes of Hazzard	Himself	
2006	Jackass Number Two	Himself	Guest appearance
2010	Jackass 3D	Himself	Final film Guest appearaance
2026	Jackass: Best and Last	Himself	Archive footage
