= Gene Gene the Dancing Machine =

American entertainer (1932–2015)

- Born: Eugene Sidney Patton Sr. April 25, 1932; Berkeley, California, United States
- Died: March 9, 2015 (aged 82); Pasadena, California, United States
- Occupations: Television personality, dancer, stagehand

Eugene Sidney Patton Sr. (April 25, 1932 – March 9, 2015), also known as Gene Patton and more widely known by his stage name Gene Gene the Dancing Machine, was a television personality, dancer and stagehand who worked at NBC Studios in Burbank, California. Patton was the first African-American member of the International Alliance of Theatrical and Stage Employees, Local 33.

Patton became familiar to television audiences for his various appearances on the network's talent search game show, The Gong Show. In addition to his stage duties, Patton was one of several amateur performers who would warm up and entertain the audience during commercial breaks. Host Chuck Barris found him so entertaining that he had him dance on the show on-air, and he proved so popular that he soon became a recurring act, then an occasional judge. Patton usually wore the same outfit each time he appeared, which consisted of a green sweater jacket, a flat cap, bell-bottomed slacks, and sneakers.

On The Gong Show, Patton's appearances were treated as spontaneous (in reality, they were always written into the show). After Barris would finish with a certain act, the piano player in Milton DeLugg's band would begin to play in octaves the familiar bass line of the first few bars of "Jumpin' at the Woodside," a popular Count Basie tune, and the proceedings would come to an immediate halt once Barris heard the music. Barris would usually react with gleeful surprise, then enthusiastically announce the arrival of "Gene Gene, the Dancing Machine!" The curtain would then rise and Patton would appear from off stage, moving his feet and shoulders to the music, with Barris usually dancing along. DeLugg's arrangement morphed perfectly into Basie's "One O'Clock Jump," at which time Gene showed off his trademark "armspread" move, along with everyone else in the house. Patton's fellow stagehands would toss all manner of things onto the stage while he continued to dance. Through his performances, Patton gained membership in AFTRA.

Patton performed on the NBC edition of The Gong Show until its cancellation in July, 1978 and on the weekly syndicated series until it was canceled in the autumn of 1980. For the last two seasons of the syndicated series, Patton's Gong Show appearances were scaled back significantly; following NBC's cancellation of the show in the summer of 1978, production was moved from the NBC Burbank studios to what is now KTLA's studios in Los Angeles; since Patton was a full-time NBC employee, he remained there.

== After The Gong Show ==
- Patton appeared in The Gong Show Movie, which was released in 1980. He had some dialogue in the film.
- Patton worked as a stagehand on The Tonight Show Starring Johnny Carson and appeared on screen in at least two episodes. He could be seen by the live audience during the shows sitting up in the rafters operating a spotlight. Once on June 20, 1984, as part of Johnny's soap opera parody, Johnny refers to him as "Buford Styversen, Sludge Falls' only blues singer," and once on March 12, 1986, in which he played a general.
- Patton appeared on the November 3, 1993, episode of Late Night with Conan O'Brien doing his trademark shuffle during an interview with Barris.
- Patton had a cameo as himself in the film Confessions of a Dangerous Mind, which was based on Barris' autobiography.

== Death ==
Patton died in Pasadena, California, on March 9, 2015, from complications from diabetes.
