= Operation: Entertainment =

American musical comedy TV series

- Genre: Music; Comedy
- Created by: Chuck Barris
- Starring: Various
- Narrated by: Johnny Jacobs
- Country of origin: United States
- Original language: English
- No. of seasons: 1
- No. of episodes: 31

Production
- Producers: Chuck Barris; Bill Carruthers
- Production location: Various
- Running time: 52 minutes

Original release
- Network: ABC
- Release: January 5, 1968 – January 24, 1969

Operation: Entertainment is an American musical comedy television program that was directly aimed at past and present veterans of the military.

The show was produced and created by producer and game show host Chuck Barris along with Bill Carruthers. It was first televised on ABC on January 5, 1968. Louis Armstrong was a performer on the pilot episode. Each week, the show was filmed at a different military base and had a different host. The show's regulars were Jim Lange, the Terry Gibbs Band, and the Operation: Entertainment girls. (Sivi Alberg, Darien Daniels, Marina Gahne and Eileen O'Neill). The show was announced by Johnny Jacobs.

The series aired a total of 31 episodes, 52 minutes in length each which were broadcast between January 5, 1968 – January 24, 1969.

The show's pilot music used a Terry Gibb's tune called "Pretty Blue Eyes". During the show's series, the closing theme was a Cole Porter tune called "You'd Be So Nice To Come Home To", performed live with the Terry Gibbs Dream Band.

Jack Shea was the director, and Ruth Goldberg was the talent coordinator.

== Episodes ==
The premiere episode featured Vikki Carr, the Lennon Sisters, and The Checkmates Ltd. at Camp Pendleton, California.

Flip Wilson was host for the April 5, 1968, episode.

The September 27, 1968, episode had Martha Raye, Phil Harris, Slappy White, and Nancy Ames.
