= How's Your Mother-in-Law? =

- Created by: Chuck Barris
- Presented by: Wink Martindale
- Announcer: Johnny Jacobs
- Country of origin: United States

Production
- Running time: 30 minutes
- Production company: Chuck Barris Productions

Original release
- Network: ABC
- Release: December 4, 1967 – March 1, 1968

How's Your Mother-in-Law? is a comedy game show hosted by Wink Martindale that aired on ABC from December 4, 1967 to March 1, 1968.

The daytime series was produced and created by Chuck Barris during a period which, as he recounted in his autobiography Confessions of a Dangerous Mind, had him creating horrible formats due to the success of The Newlywed Game and The Dating Game (he also created The Family Game earlier in 1967).

== Gameplay ==
Three mothers-in-law were represented by comedians acting as "defense attorneys". On the first week, the comedians were George Carlin, Richard Dawson, and Larry Storch; the show later included Nipsey Russell and Milt Kamen.

After each comedian presented his "case", a "jury" of five unmarried men and five unmarried women picked the mother-in-law they'd most like to have. That mother-in-law received $100. Each woman's son-in-law provided information (usually derogatory) to the comedians before the show.

== Episode status ==
Four episodes are held at the UCLA Film and Television Archive – the Premiere, Episode #12 (December 19), and the show's two pilots (titled Here Come the Mothers-in-Law).
