= Tom Campbell (radio personality) =

American radio personality

Tom Campbell (nicknamed Tall Tom Campbell, fl. late 20th century) is an American radio personality and commercial voiceover talent.

After serving in the United States Air Force, Campbell was hired for his first radio job, at KEEL in Shreveport, La., by Al Hart, who would later become a newscaster and radio personality in San Francisco.

Campbell subsequently worked in Minneapolis, Minnesota and at WONE in Dayton, Ohio before his move to KYA 1260 AM San Francisco in 1967. He was known to loan his personal phonograph, record collection and even his car to individual listeners under the caveat that they simply return them, which they apparently did. His home and car phone numbers were publicly listed in the white and yellow pages of most Bay Area phone books, and he would receive calls from listeners at home.

Some of his devoted listeners and regular callers included "The Queen of Darkness" and "The Queen of Lightness" of Oakland, "The Mad Bomber" of Berkeley, and "The Wizard" of San Francisco.

On September 9, 1968, Campbell pulled a notable publicity stunt on KYA, claiming that a listener to another program, the Sunday-night phone-in program known as The Action Line, had disparaged Campbell's accessibility to his fans. Campbell opened his program that evening with a phone call, during which he booked a one-way ticket to New York. Later in the program, he noted that he had been offered jobs in both New York and Chicago, and that if his listeners felt the same way about him, he would simply leave San Francisco and take a job elsewhere.

Phone calls, telegrams and petitions reportedly flooded into the station, and Campbell kept himself off the air until all of the "votes" for or against him were counted. In the end, it was announced that sufficient pro-Campbell votes had been received, and he triumphantly returned to the broadcast booth the next night.

Campbell remained at KYA until 1970, then moved to KLOK in San Jose and KNEW in Oakland. Among his best-known advertising clients were Matthew’s TV & Stereo ("6400 Mission Street, Top of the hill, Daly City"), Motor Music, Goodies Speed Shops and The Comfort Zone waterbed stores. He would also make public appearances to promote local Pizza Hut restaurants before relocating to Southern California in the mid-1970s, becoming a ubiquitous commercial voiceover artist.

In March 1974, the San Mateo and San Francisco County District Attorneys charged Tom Campbell and local stereo store owner Steven Matthew David (Matthew’s, "Top of The Hill" Daly City) for using what the San Francisco Examiner called “bait and switch” tactics. David and Campbell advertised impossibly low prices on products that were conveniently out of stock as a way of luring customers into the store. David paid an out-of-court settlement of $80,000.

Campbell also did weekly broadcasts through the Armed Forces Radio Network and visited troops stationed overseas and emceed concerts at Bay Area venues such as the Circle Star Theater in San Carlos, California (Tom Jones/Engelbert Humperdinck), Sandcastle nightclub in Los Altos (Zola Taylor and the Platters, The Coasters and Clyde McPhatter), and several oldies rock and roll concerts with scores of headliners.

Campbell also briefly hosted a short-lived game show in 1980, Camouflage, which was produced by Chuck Barris and taped in Hollywood. Although Campbell never hosted another game show, he was later considered for the emcee position on Sale of the Century and presided over an unsold 1985 pilot for a revival of Gambit.
