= The Game Game =

American television game show

- Created by: Chuck Barris
- Presented by: Jim McKrell
- Announcer: Johnny Jacobs
- Country of origin: United States
- No. of episodes: 68+

Production
- Running time: 30 Minutes
- Production company: Chuck Barris Productions

Original release
- Network: Syndicated
- Release: September 29, 1969 – September 1970

The Game Game is a game show hosted by Jim McKrell. It was packaged by Chuck Barris and aired during the 1969–1970 season. The show was Barris's first syndicated program.

== Gameplay ==
The game involved one contestant and three celebrities. All four players would participate in a type of personality test, with the intent of answering the focal question of the particular episode (like "How courageous are you?" or "How impulsive are you?"). Before the game, the civilian player would predict whether he/she would score higher or lower than the celebrities. If this prediction proved to be correct at the end of the show, he/she would win a prize (but all players won a small prize for participating). The tests consisted of five questions, all with four multiple-choice answers. Each player answered the question, then host McKrell read the point value for every answer (either 0, 5, 10, or 15 points).

After all five questions had been completed, each celebrity would reveal their scores, and then the civilian player would reveal his/hers. The scores were compared and prizes were awarded corresponding to the civilian player's earlier prediction – $25 for each correct prediction, or $100 if the contestant met his prediction on the three celebrities. Additionally, the contestant received a prize just for competing. Each episode of The Game Game featured a different non-celebrity contestant.

== Episode status ==
The series is presumed to be intact, along with most of Barris' other games. GSN has aired only two episodes, while a third (Episode #68/"How Well Do You Make Decisions?") circulates among collectors.

One 1969 episode featured young comedian George Carlin, who rarely participated in the game show circuit. Carlin, however, was a close friend of host Jim McKrell, who worked with Carlin in 1959–60 at Fort Worth radio station KXOL. Snapshots of the video from this episode can be found online.
