= Chuck Barris =

American game show host (1929–2017)

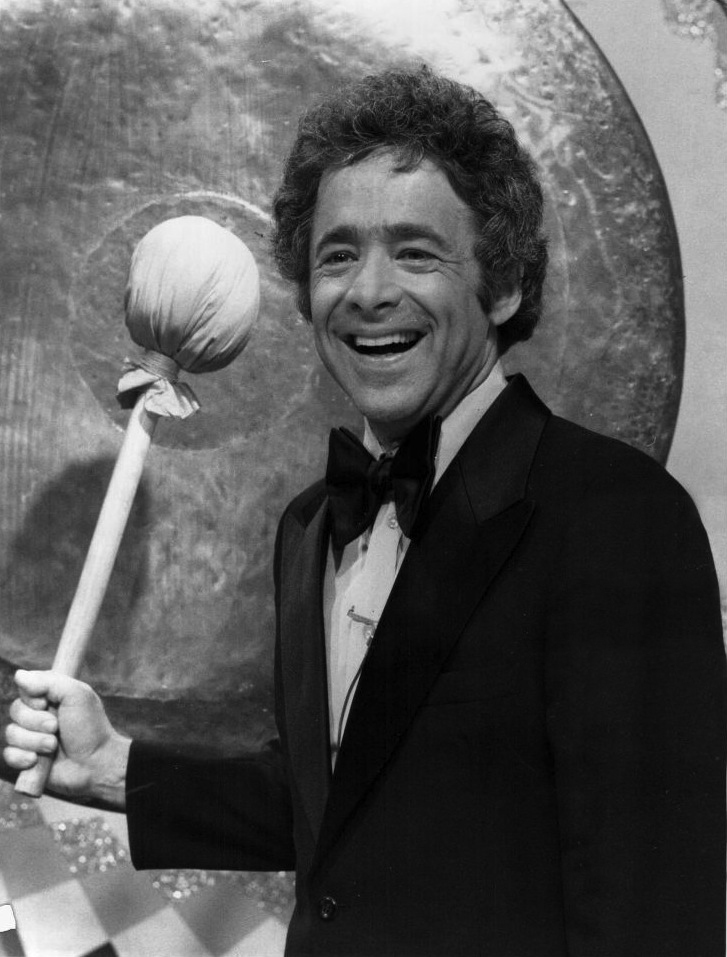
- Barris in 1977
- Born: Charles Hirsch Barris; June 3, 1929; Philadelphia, Pennsylvania, U.S.
- Died: March 21, 2017 (aged 87); Palisades, New York, U.S.
- Education: Drexel Institute of Technology
- Occupations: Television producer; television presenter; songwriter; author
- Years active: 1962–2010
- Spouses: Lyn Levy (m. 1957; div. 1976) Robin Altman (m. 1980; div. 1999) Mary Clagett (m. 2000)
- Children: 1

Charles Hirsch Barris (June 3, 1929 – March 21, 2017) was an American game show creator, producer, and host, author, and songwriter. A key crew member of several hugely successful television game shows, he was the creator of The Dating Game (1965–2021), the original producer of The Newlywed Game (1966–2013) both for the ABC network and syndication, and the host and producer of The Gong Show from 1976 to 1980, for the NBC network and syndication.

His songwriting credits include "Palisades Park", first recorded by Freddy Cannon in 1962 and also recorded by the Ramones in 1989, and he wrote three novels and four memoirs. Barris made unsubstantiated claims that he was an active international assassin for the CIA in the 1960s and the 1970s in parallel to his career, including in his 1984 memoir Confessions of a Dangerous Mind, which was adapted into a 2002 film of the same name by director George Clooney and screenwriter Charlie Kaufman, starring Sam Rockwell as Barris, and in which his alleged CIA career is mostly portrayed in an absurdist manner.

== Early life ==
Barris was born to a Jewish family in Philadelphia, Pennsylvania, on June 3, 1929, the son of Edith (née Cohen) and Nathaniel Barris, a dentist. He was raised in Lower Merion Township and attended Lower Merion High School. His uncle was singer, songwriter, and actor Harry Barris. He graduated in 1953 from Drexel University where he was a columnist for the student newspaper, The Triangle.

== Career ==
Barris got his start in television as a page and later was part of the staff at NBC in New York City. After his stint at NBC, Barris worked as a standards-and-practices person at the television music show American Bandstand for ABC. He produced pop music for records and television, and wrote "Palisades Park," which was recorded by Freddy Cannon and peaked at No. 3 on the Billboard Hot 100 for two weeks (June 23–30, 1962) to become the biggest hit of Cannon's career. Barris also wrote or co-wrote some of the music that appeared on his game shows.

Barris was promoted to the daytime programming division at ABC in Los Angeles and was responsible for determining which game shows the network would air. When he told his bosses at ABC that he felt the game show concepts being pitched were worse than his own ideas, they suggested that he quit his programming job and become a producer.

Barris formed his own production company, Chuck Barris Productions, on June 14, 1965. His first success came with The Dating Game, which debuted in 1965 on ABC. The show was hosted by Jim Lange and featured three contestants who competed for a date with a person hidden from their view. The contestants' suggestive banter and its "flower power"-motif studio set were a revolution for the game show genre. The show ran until 1980 and was twice revived, later in the 1980s and 1990s. A celebrity version of the show began in June 2021.

In 1966, Barris launched The Newlywed Game, originally created by Nick Nicholson and E. Roger Muir, also for ABC. The combination of the newlywed couples' humorous candor and host Bob Eubanks's sly questioning made the show another hit for Barris. The show is the longest-lasting of any developed by his company, broadcast until 1985, for a total of 19 years on both "first run" network TV and syndication. Interviewed on the NPR program Wait Wait... Don't Tell Me! on August 1, 2009, Barris said The Newlywed Game was the easiest program he had developed: "All I needed was four couples, eight questions, and a washer-dryer."

Barris created several other short-lived game shows for ABC in the 1960s and for syndication in the 1970s, all of which revolved around a common theme: the game play normally derived its interest (and often, humor) from the excitement, vulnerability, embarrassment, or anger of the contestants or participants in the game. Barris also made several attempts through the years at non-game formats, such as ABC's Operation: Entertainment, a variety show staged at military bases akin to USO shows; a CBS revival of Your Hit Parade; and The Bobby Vinton Show, a Canada-based syndicated variety show for singer Bobby Vinton (produced in conjunction with Chris Bearde and Allan Blye). The last was his most successful program other than a game show.

=== The Gong Show ===
Somewhat shy, Barris disliked appearing on camera, though he once dashed onto the set of The New Treasure Hunt to throw a pie at emcee Geoff Edwards. But he became a public figure in 1976 when he produced and hosted the talent show spoof The Gong Show, which he packaged in partnership with television producer Chris Bearde. The show's cult following has endured, though it ran only two seasons on NBC (1976–78) and four in syndication (1976–80). As with some of Barris's other projects (including The Newlywed Game), it was at one point possible to see The Gong Show twice daily, a relatively uncommon feat before cable TV's expansion into the commercial market.

The NBC show's original host was John Barbour, who initially misunderstood the show's concept as a straight talent show, as opposed to Barris's parody concept. Barbour was dropped as host at the last minute; to save the show, Barris took the advice of an NBC executive who suggested that he should host it himself.

Though initially uneasy before the camera, Barris soon settled in comfortably as the show's host. His jokey, bumbling personality, accentuated hand-clapping between sentences (which eventually had the studio audience joining in with him), and catchphrases (he usually went into commercial break with "We'll be right back with more, uh, STUFF"—occasionally paired with shifting his head to reveal the later ubiquitous sign behind the stage reading simply "STUFF"—and "This is me saying 'bye'" was one of his favorite closing lines) were the antithesis of the smooth TV host (such as Gary Owens, who emceed the syndicated version of the show in its first season). Barris joined in with the eccentricity of the format, using unusual props, dressing in colorful and somewhat unusual clothing and wearing strange hats, pulled down and nearly covering his eyes. He became yet another performer of the show, and for many viewers, a cult hero. Dubbed "Chuckie Baby" by his fans, Barris was a perfect fit with the show's goofy, sometimes wild amateur performers and its panel of three judges (including regulars Jamie Farr, Jaye P. Morgan, and Arte Johnson). In addition, there was a growing "cast of characters", including an NBC stage carpenter who played "Father Ed," a priest who got flustered when his cue cards were deliberately turned upside-down; stand-up comedian Murray Langston, who as "The Unknown Comic" wore a paper bag over his head (with cutouts for his eyes, mouth, and even a box of Kleenex) and "Gene Gene the Dancing Machine", who was arguably the most popular member of The Gong Show "cast". Gene Gene was actually Gene Patton, the show's stagehand, who danced onto the stage whenever the band played "Jumpin' at the Woodside". In the 1980s, long after The Gong Show was canceled, NBC tour guides still pointed Patton out to crowds as his character while he was working as a stagehand.

One Gong Show episode consisted of every act appearing singing the song "Feelings", which was popular at the time. One of its most infamous incidents came on the NBC version in 1978, when Barris presented an onstage act consisting of two teenage girls slowly and suggestively sucking popsicles. Another incident was when during a "Gene Gene, The Dancing Machine" segment, Jaye P. Morgan opened her blouse to reveal her bare breasts.

In 1980, Barris directed and starred in The Gong Show Movie, which performed so poorly both critically and financially, it was pulled from theaters shortly after release. The film was released on Blu-ray in 2016.

The Gong Show has had four subsequent revivals, one under Barris's title (with Don Bleu) in 1988–89, one on The Game Show Network in 2000 called Extreme Gong, and one with current format owner Sony Pictures Television in 2008, hosted by stand-up comedian Dave Attell. A fourth version, produced by Will Arnett and hosted by fictional British celebrity "Tommy Maitland" (Mike Myers), aired on ABC beginning in 2017.

=== Comebacks and setbacks ===
Barris continued strongly until the mid-1970s, when ABC canceled the Dating and Newlywed games. This left Barris with only one show, his weekly syndicated effort The New Treasure Hunt, but the success of The Gong Show in 1976 encouraged him to revive the Dating and Newlywed games, as well as adding The $1.98 Beauty Show to his syndication empire. He also hosted a prime-time variety hour for NBC from February to April 1978 called The Chuck Barris Rah-Rah Show, essentially a non-competitive knock-off of Gong.

The empire crumbled again amid the burnout of another of his creations, the 1979–1980 Three's a Crowd, in which three sets of wives and secretaries competed to see who knew more about their husbands/bosses. This show provoked protests from both feminist and socially conservative groups, who charged that the show deliberately exploited adultery to advocate it as a social norm. Most stations dropped it months before the season was over as a response to those criticisms. At the same time, The Newlywed Game lost the sponsorships of Ford and Procter & Gamble and earned the resentment of Gene Autry, owner of the show's Los Angeles outlet and production base, KTLA, because of its supposedly highly prurient content. Autry's feelings were so strong that The Newlywed Game was nearly evicted from the KTLA facilities, but the show was discontinued by the syndicator before any action occurred. The Gong Show and The Dating Game also ended otherwise successful syndicated runs in 1980.

During the winter of 1980, Barris attempted to rebuild by bringing back another game show that was not an original of his, Camouflage, in which contestants answered questions for the chance to locate a "hidden object" (such as a toaster) concealed within a cartoon-type drawing. Although a noncontroversial format, it lasted only a short time in syndication. By September 1980, for the first time in his company's history, Barris had no shows in production.

After a year's inactivity, Barris revived Treasure Hunt again in 1981 in partnership with the original 1950s version's producer, Budd Granoff, who had become his business partner (the show itself was created by its original host, Jan Murray). Unlike with the 1970s version of Treasure Hunt, Barris did not have direct involvement with the production of the show itself. This revival, a five-day-a-week strip, lasted only one year.

After briefly living in France, Barris returned in 1984 and formed Barris Industries and a distribution unit called Bel-Air Program Sales (later Barris Program Sales) and an ad-sales barter called Clarion Communications (later Barris Advertising Sales). After a week-long trial of The Newlywed Game on ABC in 1984 (with Dating Game emcee Jim Lange), Barris produced the daily Newlywed Game (titled The New Newlywed Game) in syndication from 1985 to 1989, with original host Eubanks (and in 1988, comedian Paul Rodriguez). The Dating Game returned to syndication the next year for a three-year run (the first year hosted by Elaine Joyce, and the next two hosted by Jeff MacGregor). The Gong Show also returned for one season in 1988, hosted by "True" Don Bleu. All those shows (except the one-week trial run of Newlywed on ABC) aired in syndication, not on the networks.

In 1987, Barris sold his shares of Barris Industriesto Burt Sugarman and returned to France, no longer directly involved in his company. In 1988, Barris Industries acquired the Guber-Peters Company. On September 7, 1989, Barris Industries was renamed the Guber-Peters Entertainment Company. After the shows' runs ended, Sony Corporation acquired Guber-Peters Entertainment (formerly Barris Industries) for $200 million on September 29, 1989, a day after Sony Corporation of Japan acquired Columbia Pictures Entertainment. The sale was completed on November 9, 1989. Sony revived Dating and Newlywed from 1996 to 1999. It also revived The Gong Show in 1998, this time as Extreme Gong, a Game Show Network (GSN) original production. Three's a Crowd was revived as All New Three's a Crowd, which, like Extreme Gong, was a GSN original. A few years after Extreme Gong ended, Sony planned to revive the show again under its classic name and format for The WB Television Network, but this version was never realized. Sony and MTV Networks' Comedy Central collaborated on a fourth Gong Show revival as The Gong Show with Dave Attell in 2008; this did sell and aired on Comedy Central from July to September 2008.

One more attempt at reviving an old game show that was not his own originally resulted in an unsold pilot of the 1950s-era game Dollar a Second, hosted by Eubanks. It had at least one showing on GSN and has become part of the collector/trader's circuit. Two more unsold pilots were called Bamboozle and Comedy Courtroom.

In 2010, Barris published Della: A Memoir of My Daughter, about the death of his only child, who died in 1998 after a long struggle with drug addiction.

== CIA career claims ==
In 1984, Barris wrote an autobiography, Confessions of a Dangerous Mind. In the book he states that he worked for the Central Intelligence Agency (CIA) as an assassin in the 1960s and the 1970s in Southeast Asia, Latin America, and the Middle East. A 2002 feature film version, directed by George Clooney and starring Sam Rockwell, depicts Barris killing 33 people. Barris wrote a sequel to Confessions of a Dangerous Mind in 2004 called Bad Grass Never Dies.

The CIA denied Barris ever worked for them in any capacity. After the release of the movie, CIA spokesman Paul Nowack said Barris's assertions that he worked for the spy agency "[are] ridiculous. It's absolutely not true".

In an interview on NBC's Today Show in 1984, Barris admitted to having made the story up. "No, I was never a CIA hit man. I never did those things. I once applied for the CIA, and while I was going through the process I got a job and went on television. But I had always wondered what would have happened if I had done both." In an interview in 2010 with the Television Academy Foundation, he was asked if he had ever disclosed the truth to anyone, including his wife. "No, never," Barris said. "I'll never say, one way or the other".

== Personal life and death ==
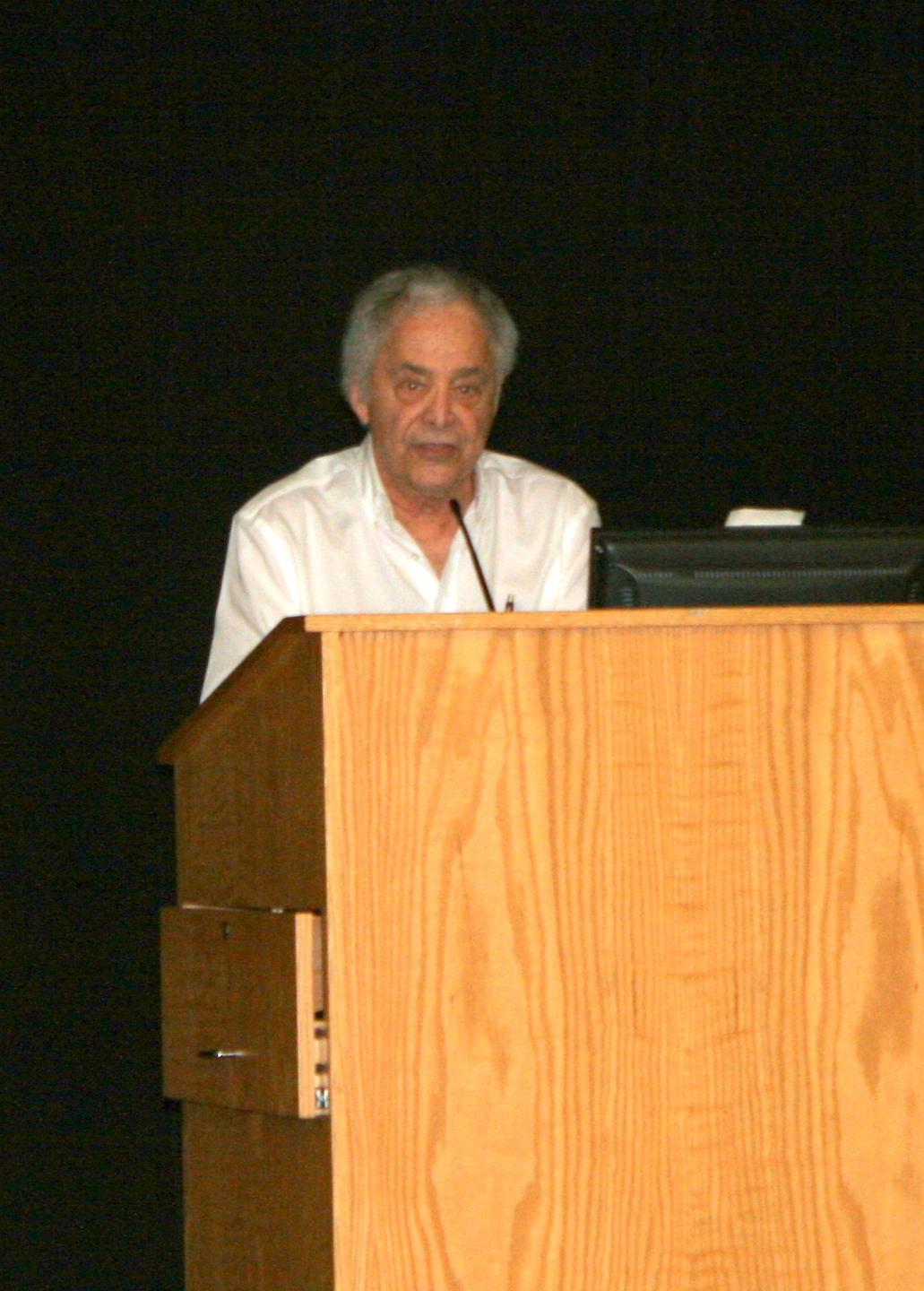
Barris at Drexel University in 2010

Barris's first wife was Lyn Levy, the niece of one of the founders of CBS. Their marriage lasted from 1957 to 1976, ending in divorce. Together they had a daughter, Della, who frequently appeared on The Gong Show, usually introducing her father. Della died of an alcohol and cocaine overdose in 1998 at the age of 36.

In 1980, Barris married Robin Altman. They divorced in 1999. The following year, he married Mary Clagett.

Barris was diagnosed with lung cancer in the 1990s. After undergoing surgery to remove part of his lung, he contracted an infection and spent a month in intensive care.

Barris died on March 21, 2017, of natural causes at the age of 87 at his home in Palisades, New York, where he lived with Clagett.

== Shows ==
- The $1.98 Beauty Show
- Bamboozle (unsold pilot)
- Camouflage
- The Chuck Barris Rah-Rah Show
- Comedy Courtroom (unsold pilot)
- Cop Out (unsold pilot)
- The Dating Game
- Dollar a Second (unsold pilot)
- Dream Girl of '67
- The Mama Cass Television Show (ABC special, 1969)
- The Family Game
- The Game Game
- The Gong Show
- How's Your Mother-in-Law?
- Leave It to the Women
- The Newlywed Game
- Operation: Entertainment
- The Parent Game
- People Pickers (unsold pilot)
- Three's a Crowd
- The New Treasure Hunt/Treasure Hunt
- Your Hit Parade (CBS, 1974)

== Discography ==
Barris composed music which he released on the following 45 rpm records. Songs with an asterisk (*) are songs not composed by Barris, yet featured on the recordings:

- "Too Rich" / "I Know A Child" (Capitol Records)
- "Baja California" / *"Donnie" (Dot Records)
- "Why Me Oh Lord" / "Sometimes It Just Don't Pay To Get Up" (MCA Records)

Barris also composed the following songs (with performer, who performed the music first, listed on each). The first two songs were released on "Swan" 45 rpm records, and the third released on a "Decca" LP record:

- "Summertime Guy" (Eddie Rambeau; an instrumental version of this song was used as the theme for The Newlywed Game)
- "Palisades Park" (Freddy Cannon)
- "Love Sickness" (Milton DeLugg)

In 1973, Barris released an LP of television game show music, Chuck Barris Presents Themes From TV Game Shows (Friends Records). All tracks are instrumentals and are arranged by Tom Scott, Mike Barone, and Dale Oehler. The tracks for the LP, as listed from the back of the LP jacket, are as follows:

Side 1
No.	Title	Length
1.	"Dating Game Theme" (January/CBP Music, Inc. BMI Chuck Barris/David Mook)
2.	"Dating Game Closing Theme" (Little Rosie)
3.	"Newlywed Game Theme"
4.	"Treasure Hunt Theme"
5.	"True Grit - Winners Theme" (Bernstein, Famous Music ASCAP)
6.	"Treasure Hunt Losers Theme"
7.	"People Pickers Theme" (Pretty Maidens)

Side 2
No.	Title	Length
1.	"Operation Entertainment Theme" (Road Of Love)
2.	"Family Game Theme" (Too Rich)
3.	"Cop-Out Theme" (Little Russian Song)
4.	"Mother-In-Law Theme" (Mother Trucker)
5.	"Parent Game Theme" (Baja California)
6.	"Dream Girl Theme" (Hunk Of Love)

== Books ==
- You and Me, Babe (1974) Novel
- Confessions of a Dangerous Mind (1984) Memoir
- The Game Show King (1993) Memoir
- Bad Grass Never Dies (2004) Memoir
- The Big Question (2007) Novel
- Who Killed Art Deco? (2009) Novel
- Della: A Memoir of My Daughter (2010) Memoir

== CDs ==
- Confessions of A Dangerous Singer (Domo Records, 2003)
- Confessions of a Dangerous Mind (Domo Records, 2003)
