= Camouflage (game show) =

- Genre: Game show
- Created by: Jerry Hammer
- Directed by: Gilbert Cates (1961–62); John "The Fox" Dorsey (1980)
- Presented by: Don Morrow; Tom Campbell
- Announcer: Johnny Gilbert; Johnny Jacobs
- Composers: Paul Taubman (1961–1962); Milton Delugg (1980)
- Country of origin: United States

Production
- Producer: David M. Greenfield
- Running time: 30 minutes
- Production companies: Jerry Hammer Productions (1961–1962); Chuck Barris Productions (1980)

Original release
- Network: ABC
- Release: January 9, 1961 – November 16, 1962
- Network: Syndicated (weekly)
- Release: February 4 – May 2, 1980

Camouflage is an American television game show originally produced in 1961–62 and revived in 1980.

== 1961–62 ==
The original game show was created and produced by Jerry Hammer of Jerry Hammer Productions, directed by Gilbert Cates with Don Morrow as host, and Johnny Gilbert as the announcer (as well as a substitute host for Morrow), with Chet Gould as the show's alternate announcer. Paul Taubman provided the show's live music. Contestants tried to find objects hidden on an electronic board by tracing the outline of the object using a wand. Each contestant had a separate board which his or her opponent could not see.

The game began with Morrow telling the contestants what object to look for. He then asked them a true-false question; a countdown clock began at 10 and stopped when a contestant buzzed in (there was a penalty for buzzing in after the clock reached zero for the third time). A correct answer was worth points determined by time left on the clock, and removed a piece of the camouflage; the contestant had ten seconds to find and trace the object. If s/he tried and failed, the opponent got 10 points and a chance to trace it. An incorrect answer also gave the opponent the points and control of the board. To help, once a player scored 30 points in the quiz, s/he got to see what the object looked like. The first player to spot and trace the object won the game and a prize. When it was obvious that the contestant had spotted and begun to trace the object, Morrow would say, "You say it's there...it is there!"

Each game had a predetermined point value (up to 200 points), with ten points deducted from the value of the game when a contestant made an incorrect tracing or chose to pass and wait for more of the camouflage to be removed. The winner's prize was determined by that person's score in the quiz added to the points left in the overall value of the game. The day's big winner was given one more object to find in fifteen seconds for a new car. For the bonus round, none of the camouflage was removed. Contestants retired after winning the car or five games, whichever came first.

The original version of Camouflage aired from January 9, 1961, to November 16, 1962, on ABC. From its premiere to June 29, 1962, it aired at 12:00 PM, Eastern; beginning July 2, 1962, and continuing for the remainder of its run it moved to 12:30 PM and its running time was cut to 25 minutes, with a five-minute newscast airing at 12:55.

One of the artists responsible for creating the elaborate drawings for the show, Eric Lieber (then a commercial art student), went on to create the influential relationship show Love Connection in 1983.

== 1980 ==
On February 4, 1980, Chuck Barris revived this show for syndication with Los Angeles disc jockey Tom Campbell as host. This time around, the contestants answered general-knowledge questions for $50 apiece, and each game had a designated dollar value of $200–$1,000, with three games played per show. The bonus round was basically the same as on the original version, except there was no time limit.

After several weeks, the format was changed slightly: two contestants competed in game 1, followed by two new contestants in game 2, with the potential values of each game reduced to $200–$500 and the winner of each game playing the bonus round for an additional $1,000. The 3rd game was a playoff between the winners of the first two games, with the champion going on to play the "Super Bonus Puzzle" for the car.

Other program personnel included announcer Johnny Jacobs and musical director Milton DeLugg, who with his "Band with a Thug" rhythm section provided live music in the studio.

=== Scheduling and ratings ===
This was one of the last once-a-week game shows to air in access time (7:00-8:00 PM Eastern, 6:00-7:00 PM Central), as most stations were switching to Monday-through-Friday "strip" shows. Consequently, Camouflage did not get wide distribution in syndication and was cancelled on May 2. Only thirteen episodes aired.

== Episode status ==
=== ABC ===
The original series is most likely destroyed, with only two episodes known to exist (both from 1962) – January 8 (the first-anniversary show, with Gilbert guest-hosting) and April 27 (promotes the short-lived game show Window Shopping "coming up next"). A third episode is held by the UCLA Film and Television Archive, along with the latter episode above.

=== 1980 ===
The series is likely extant, given that Game Show Network reran several episodes of this version in the 1990s, along with another episode as a Game of the Week in 2000 – although they have not been rerun since.
