= The Bobby Vinton Show =

- Genre: Variety Show
- Created by: Chris Bearde
- Directed by: Michael Steele
- Presented by: Bobby Vinton
- Ending theme: "My Melody of Love"
- Country of origin: Canada
- Original language: English

Production
- Executive producers: Alan Blye; Chris Bearde
- Producers: Philip McLaren; Alan Thicke
- Running time: 30 minutes
- Production company: Chuck Barris Productions

Original release
- Network: CTV
- Release: September 9, 1975 – 1978

The Bobby Vinton Show is a Canadian musical variety television series produced for the CTV Television Network between 1975 and 1978, with a total of 52 episodes broadcast. Featuring Bobby Vinton, a best-selling popular music singer since the early 1960s, the series mixed comedy skits with musical interludes. Appearing on the series as a regular was comedian Billy Van. The series often satirized Vinton's Polish heritage, and its theme song was an "umpah band" rendition of his 1974 song "My Melody of Love" (Vinton also ended each episode by performing the song himself). The series was created by Chris Bearde and packaged by Chuck Barris. The shows always commenced with a large woman named Monique dancing the guest out to the stage.

The series was syndicated to local stations in the United States, although the program's entry in the user-edited Internet Movie Database suggests it may also have been broadcast by CBS during 1975 (CBS did broadcast his one-hour special, Bobby Vinton's Rock N' Rollers, during 1978).

The series also spawned a 1975 soundtrack album on ABC Records; see The Bobby Vinton Show (album).

Guests appearing on the show included:

- Abbe Lane
- Adrienne Barbeau
- Anne Murray
- Arte Johnson
- Barbara Mandrell
- Barbara Walters
- Charlie Callas
- Clifton Davis
- Dion DiMucci
- Don Rickles
- Donna Fargo
- Donna Summer
- Ethel Merman
- Freda Payne
- Foster Brooks
- Freddy Fender
- Henny Youngman
- Jessica Walter
- Joanie Sommers
- John Byner
- Lainie Kazan
- Lesley Gore
- Loretta Swit
- Lynn Anderson
- Melba Moore
- O. J. Simpson
- Patti Page
- Paul Williams
- Petula Clark
- Phyllis Diller
- Tanya Tucker
- Ted Knight
- Teresa Brewer
- The Spinners
- Trini Lopez
