= Puttin' on the Hits =

American television series

- Genre: Reality competition
- Created by: Chris Bearde
- Presented by: Allen Fawcett
- Country of origin: United States
- No. of seasons: 4
- No. of episodes: 134

Production
- Executive producers: Dick Clark; Chris Bearde
- Production locations: Universal City Studios; Hollywood, California
- Production companies: Chris Bearde Productions; Dick Clark Productions; MCA Television

Original release
- Network: Syndication
- Release: September 15, 1984 – July 3, 1988

Puttin' on the Hits is an American syndicated music/variety competition show that was hosted and written by Allen Fawcett. The show featured amateur acts lip-synching to popular songs. It aired on weekends from 1984 to 1988. The show's title refers to Irving Berlin's 1929 song "Puttin' on the Ritz", which had enjoyed a resurgence of popularity in 1983 after it became a hit for Indonesian-Dutch singer Taco.

== Description ==
The show grew out of lip synching contests developed by William "Randy" Wood, who had been hosting such competitions since 1982. Chris Bearde saw one of the contests with his daughter. He then created, developed and sold Puttin' on the Hits with Bearde and Dick Clark serving as executive producers. Clark's son, R.A. Clark, produced. MCA Television served as distributor. Puttin' on the Hits was taped in Hollywood, California, at Universal City Studios.

Contestants would often dress up in costumes and use props to make their act more outrageous. This varied from a seemingly severed head singing "I Ain't Got Nobody" to an Aretha Franklin drag act using couch cushions for breasts. Other acts were more conservative and placed emphasis on performance.

The competition was conducted as many other televised performance contests (e.g. Star Search) were. Each act was judged by a panel of celebrity judges based on their originality, appearance, and lip-sync abilities. The judges could award a maximum of ten points per category, and their score totals were combined to give an act a total score of up to ninety points. In the event of a tie, the judges made a final decision to determine each winner. Each season was conducted as a tournament. Winners of a preliminary round received $1,000. Winning in the semifinal round was worth $5,000 to an act. At the end of the season, the winners of the semifinals competed in a grand championship final with $25,000 going to the winning act. Each contestant was given complimentary gifts and a videotape of their performance.

Following the conclusion of the fourth season's tournament, the three previous season champions were invited back to compete once more against the winner of that season. The winning act won an additional $25,000.

Puttin' on the Hits has been credited with launching the career of the group Troop, and Jazzmun, a drag performer who can be seen in many contemporary television shows. Kato Kaelin was another notable contestant, appearing during the show's third season performing Steppenwolf's "Born to Be Wild".

== Children's version ==
A short-lived spinoff called Puttin' on the Kids, hosted by Michael Young, aired in the 1986–87 television season, also distributed in syndication. Celebrity judges awarded savings bonds to two weekly winners.

== See also ==
- Lip Service
- Lip Sync Battle
