= The Quiz Kids Challenge =

American television game show

- Genre: Game show
- Directed by: George Choderker
- Presented by: Jonathan Prince
- Narrated by: Johnny Gilbert; Charlie Tuna
- Country of origin: United States

Production
- Executive producers: Julian Fowles; Scott Sternberg
- Running time: approx. 26 minutes
- Production companies: The Guber-Peters Company; Chilmark Productions

Original release
- Network: Syndicated
- Release: September 10 – December 28, 1990

The Quiz Kids Challenge is an American television game show that was based loosely on prior Quiz Kids programs of the past, which involved schoolchildren trying to answer questions posed to them by various adults. It aired in syndication and was hosted by Jonathan Prince. Johnny Gilbert was the primary announcer, with Charlie Tuna also announcing.

Premiering on September 10, 1990, The Quiz Kids Challenge was one of five syndicated game shows that premiered in the fall of 1990. Plagued by low ratings from the start, the show was cancelled after sixteen weeks with the final episode airing on December 28, 1990; along with a revival of Tic-Tac-Dough, which premiered on the same day and ended its run three weeks earlier, The Quiz Kids Challenge was the only other of those five game shows that did not make it into 1991 before it was cancelled.

The series was a production of The Guber-Peters Company and Chilmark Productions and distributed by Guber-Peters Program Sales and later by Columbia Pictures Television.

== Gameplay ==
The Quiz Kids Challenge was a different take on the original Quiz Kids concept. Instead of a panel of children answering trivia question posed to them by a series of adults, the show was conducted as a head-to-head competition where a team of three adults was pitted against a team of "Quiz Kids", schoolchildren between the ages of twelve and fourteen. A new adult team competed on each show while a team of Quiz Kids played for an entire week.

=== Round one ===
A game board of nine monitors displayed eight categories. A random player was chosen to pick a category and a toss-up question was asked for $50. Buzzing in and answering correctly won the team the money, and the opposing team got a chance to answer if a player came up with an incorrect answer.

For seven of the eight categories on the board, two additional tossups were asked at $50 per correct answer. The eighth category was the "Triple Play", which only featured one tossup but paid off at $150 for the team that answered it. Once a category was played, the last player to give a correct answer chose the next category for his/her team.

Later in the run, one of the categories was labeled "Viewer's Choice"; questions fitting these types of categories were based on suggestions from the home viewing audience.

=== Round two (double or nothing) ===
In the Double or Nothing round, eight new categories were displayed on the board. The trailing team was given control of the board to start and as before, a $50 toss-up question was asked. The team that answered it could then decide to either bank the $50 or play on, and if they chose the latter option a second tossup was asked of the remaining two players. If one of them answered that question, the bank doubled to $100 and the choice was then given to the last remaining player. If that player answered a third question correctly, the team received $200 total. If one of the players gave an incorrect answer, the opposing team could steal the money and control with a correct answer. If they did not, the category was taken out of play and the player who gave the last correct answer chose a new category. The Double or Nothing round was played with a time limit, and a buzzer sounded to indicate when that limit expired.

=== 100-Second Challenge (final round) ===
The final round was a speed round that was played with four categories. To start the 100-Second Challenge, a member of the trailing team chose one of the four categories and a question in it was asked. The clock started once someone buzzed in and gave an answer. If that player answered correctly, he/she got to pick a category. If not, the opposing team was given a chance to answer. If neither team answered correctly, the category was replaced and the next question was asked from the new category.

The questions doubled in value every 25 seconds as the round progressed, effectively dividing the round into four parts. Each correct answer paid $50 during the first part, $100 during the second, $200 during the third, and $400 for the last part.

The team in the lead when time ran out won the game and kept their money, which was split three ways. Since the Quiz Kids competed for an entire week, their winnings would be banked and each day for the rest of the week, the winnings would be added to any previous money won. The Quiz Kids' final tally was revealed at the end of their week, and their total was split between the three of them.

== See also ==
- Quiz Kids
- Quizbowl
