= Jumpin' at the Woodside =

Single by Count Basie
- Released: December 17, 1938
- Recorded: August 22, 1938
- Genre: Swing
- Label: Decca
- Songwriters: Count Basie, Eddie Durham

"Jumpin' at the Woodside" is a song first recorded in 1938 by the Count Basie Orchestra, and considered one of the band's signature tunes. When first released it reached number 11 on the Billboard charts and remained on them for four weeks. Since then, it has become a frequently recorded jazz standard.

== Song details ==
The song was recorded on August 22, 1938 for Decca and was released on December 17 of that year. It charted as high as No. 11 and was on the charts for four weeks. That original 1938 recording features solos by Earle Warren (alto sax), Buck Clayton (trumpet), Lester Young (tenor sax), and Herschel Evans (clarinet).

The song is considered one of the Basie band's "signature" tunes, a "favorite", and even "a definition of swing."

While many liner notes credit the tune only to Basie, historians and others also credit band member Eddie Durham. Like many Basie numbers of that era, it was a "head arrangement" collaboratively created by the band. Sullivan indicates Durham wrote the tune in 1937 and then Basie refined it. The tune was based on earlier songs such as Jammin' for the Jackpot and John's Idea. Durham had left the band by the time it was recorded.

The word "jumpin" in the title is a triple entendre – it means lively as in "the joint is jumping", a synonym for dancing or a synonym for sex.

== The Woodside Hotel ==
The location in the title refers to the Woodside Hotel, which was located on Seventh Avenue at 142nd Street in Harlem (and has since been demolished). It was operated by Love B. Woods, an African-American who operated a number of "dingy flophouses", some of which had "unsavory reputation[s]". But the Woodside distinguished itself by becoming a popular place for jazz musicians and Negro league baseball teams to stay while in New York during segregation. Later, Woods would become better known for his involvement in operating the Hotel Theresa, a much more upscale hotel that was called the "Waldorf of Harlem".

The band stayed at the Woodside repeatedly and even rehearsed in the basement of the hotel. Singer Ella Fitzgerald (who sometimes performed with the band) also stayed at the Woodside in 1937 when the band was playing at the Roseland Ballroom.

== Other recordings and appearances ==
The song was used in famous Lindy Hop dance numbers by the troupe Whitey's Lindy Hoppers in the Broadway show Hellzapoppin as well as other shows of that era. The routine was recorded in the 1941 film version which can be seen on YouTube (though the movie was released with different music over the sequence for licensing reasons).

In addition to numerous Basie recordings over the years, the song has been recorded by a number of artists including Lionel Hampton, Monk Montgomery, Oscar Peterson, Django Reinhardt, Buddy Rich, and others. It was also arranged as a mambo by Pérez Prado Y Su Orquesta in 1955. In 1957, Jon Hendricks wrote lyrics to the tune to be performed by Lambert, Hendricks & Ross.

The appearances of Gene Gene the Dancing Machine on The Gong Show would be prefaced with the opening bars of the song.

The song is heard in the 1993 film Swing Kids and in broadway musicals such as 1999's Swing! and 2010's Come Fly Away.

In the video game Fallout 76, the Count Basie version of the song is played on the in-game radio station 'Appalachia Radio'.
