= Confessions of a Dangerous Mind (film) =

2002 film directed by George Clooney

- Theatrical release poster
- Directed by: George Clooney
- Screenplay by: Charlie Kaufman
- Based on: Confessions of a Dangerous Mind by Chuck Barris
- Produced by: Andrew Lazar
- Starring: Drew Barrymore; George Clooney; Julia Roberts; Sam Rockwell; Rutger Hauer
- Cinematography: Newton Thomas Sigel
- Edited by: Stephen Mirrione
- Music by: Alex Wurman
- Production companies: Mad Chance; Section Eight; Mel's Cite du Cinema; JVS & Co.
- Distributed by: Miramax Films
- Release date: December 31, 2002 (United States)
- Running time: 113 minutes
- Country: United States
- Language: English
- Budget: $30 million
- Box office: $33.1 million

Confessions of a Dangerous Mind is a 2002 American biographical film directed by George Clooney in his directorial debut and written by Charlie Kaufman. It stars Sam Rockwell as game show host and producer Chuck Barris; based on Barris' 1984 "unauthorized autobiography" of the same name, in which he makes unsubstantiated claims to have worked for the CIA, it also depicts Barris' alleged second career as an international assassin, albeit in an over-the-top, absurdist manner. Drew Barrymore, Clooney, Julia Roberts and Rutger Hauer star in supporting roles.

The film had a long development process; Columbia Pictures first planned to produce a film adaptation of the autobiography in the late 1980s, to be directed by Jim McBride, although nothing came of it. The film rights were purchased in 1997 by producer Andrew Lazar, who hired Kaufman to write a screenplay that quickly attracted a string of well-known directors, including David Fincher, Brian De Palma and Bryan Singer, and actors, including Mike Myers, Ben Stiller and Johnny Depp. When Clooney was hired to direct, he championed the casting of the then-unknown Rockwell and brought on Barris as consultant to provide additional authenticity; this led to uncredited rewrites that left Kaufman unhappy with the final result, including the removal of a drug addiction subplot. To accommodate the $30 million budget, Clooney convinced Barrymore and Roberts to lower their salaries.

The film was released theatrically in the United States on December 31, 2002, performing poorly at the box office. However, it received favorable reviews from critics, who praised its performances, in particular that of Rockwell, who won the Silver Bear for Best Actor at the 2003 Berlin International Film Festival.

== Plot ==
Tired of being rejected by the beautiful women he lusts after, Chuck Barris moves to Manhattan to become an NBC page with dreams of becoming famous in television but is eventually fired. He moves back to Philadelphia and becomes Dick Clark's personal assistant on American Bandstand in 1961. He writes the successful song "Palisades Park" and becomes romantically involved with a woman named Penny Pacino. Barris is given permission to pitch the concept for The Dating Game at ABC. He is given $7,500 to create a television pilot, but ABC abandons the idea in favor of Hootenanny.

One night after Barris is kicked out of a bar for fighting, he is approached by CIA agent Jim Byrd, who recruits him as an assassin. Returning from a mission in Mexico, Barris finds that Penny has become a hippie. Meanwhile, ABC green-lights The Dating Game, and by 1967 the show is a phenomenon. Byrd suggests to Barris that the prize for winners of The Dating Game should be a first date in a foreign country and that Barris should accompany them as a chaperone as cover for further assassination missions.

On a CIA mission/chaperoning trip in Helsinki, Finland, he is frequently bothered by the male winner from the couple he's chaperoning, but things improve when he meets female operative Patricia Watson. Following the completion of his mission, Barris and Patricia spend his final night in Helsinki together. He finds more success back home when The Newlywed Game goes on air. He and Penny decide to move to Los Angeles, but Barris is cautious of marriage, much to Penny's dismay. In 1970, Byrd convinces Barris to go on a mission to West Berlin to assassinate Hans Colbert. Barris is introduced to German-American agent Keeler, whom he helps to kill Colbert. However, he is captured by the KGB and, after some weeks, freed during a west–east spy exchange in which Barris discovers that the male winner from the Helsinki trip was actually a Russian spy.

In 1976, Barris creates The Gong Show, becoming famous as its host. One day, Barris and Keeler go out for a meal together, during which Keeler explains how he became an assassin. Not long later, Keeler is murdered and Byrd warns Barris of a mole in the agency. His TV shows are cancelled due to poor ratings, and Penny threatens to leave after catching him cheating. One night, Barris finds Byrd sitting atop the diving board of his backyard pool. Byrd reveals why he was chosen by the CIA to become an assassin: he is the son of a serial killer and had been raised as a girl by his mother, so he "fit the profile". Barris threatens Byrd and, moments later, Byrd is revealed to have died while still sitting on the diving board.

Faced with the unpleasant truth about himself, Barris begins to spiral out of control. After almost having a nervous breakdown on The Gong Show, Barris shuts himself away in a New York City hotel. Penny finds him and tries in vain to convince him to return to California to get married.

Barris finally leaves his room to meet Patricia in Boston. After a cup of coffee, Barris collapses, seemingly poisoned. Patricia reveals that she is the mole. However, Barris has tricked Patricia into drinking from the poisoned cup, and she falls dead as he stands up unharmed. After her death, he returns home and begins writing his autobiography, Confessions of a Dangerous Mind. He finally decides to marry Penny. At the end of the ceremony, Barris sees some of the people he killed in the crowd. Distraught, he confesses to Penny his double life as a CIA assassin, but she merely laughs, assuming he is joking, and he decides not to correct her. The film ends with a description of one final game idea from Barris: The Old Game in which three old men are given handguns and made to reminisce about their lives. Whoever doesn't turn the gun on themselves wins a refrigerator.

== Cast ==
- Sam Rockwell as Chuck Barris
  - Michael Cera as Young Chuck Barris
- Drew Barrymore as Penny Pacino
- George Clooney as Jim Byrd
- Julia Roberts as Patricia Watson
- Rutger Hauer as Keeler
- Maggie Gyllenhaal as Debbie
- Robert John Burke as Instructor Jenks
- Jennifer Hall as Georgia
- Kristen Wilson as Loretta
- J. Todd Anderson as Stud Bachelor
- Carlos Carrasco as Brazioni
- Emilio Rivera as Benitez
- Daniel Zacapa as Renda
- Krista Allen as Pretty Woman
- Michael Ensign as Simon Oliver
- James Urbaniak as Rod Flexner
- Jerry Weintraub as Larry Goldberg
- Rachelle Lefevre as Tuvia
- Richard Kind as Casting Executive
- Brad Pitt as Bachelor #1
- Matt Damon as Bachelor #2
- Jen Taylor and Spencer Kayden as Crowd Scenes (uncredited)

Barris, Dick Clark, Jim Lange, Murray Langston, Jaye P. Morgan, and Gene Patton are featured in interviews central to the storyline.

== Production ==
=== Development ===
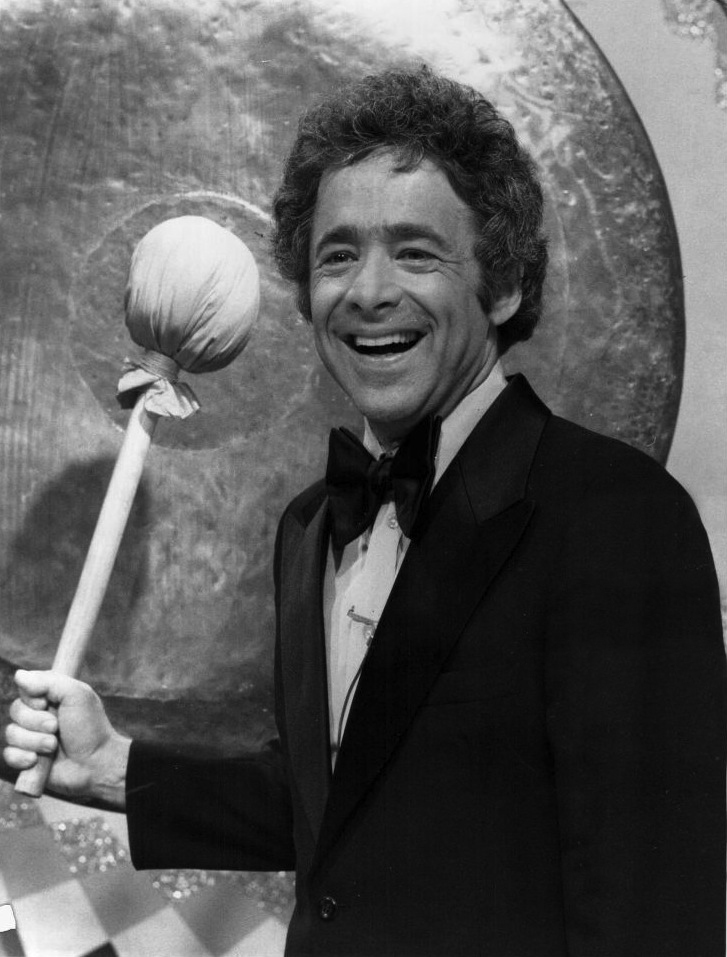
The real-life Chuck Barris hosting The Gong Show in 1976.

Chuck Barris first sold the film rights of his "unauthorized autobiography" to Columbia Pictures in the late 1980s. Columbia president Dawn Steel greenlighted Confessions of a Dangerous Mind with Jim McBride directing. McBride offered the lead role to Richard Dreyfuss, who refused to read the script because he believed Barris's morbid humor was distasteful. The project was abandoned at Columbia when Steel was fired in 1989. Producer Andrew Lazar optioned the film rights from Columbia in 1997 and set Confessions of a Dangerous Mind at Warner Bros. Pictures that same year. Charlie Kaufman entered discussions to write a new screenplay in June 1997 and finished his first draft later that year. Barris gave positive feedback to Kaufman's script and Curtis Hanson instantly agreed to direct with Sean Penn in the lead role and George Clooney and Drew Barrymore attached to co-star.

Hanson eventually dropped out, but with the financial success of My Best Friend's Wedding (1997), P. J. Hogan entered discussions with Warner Bros. to direct in January 1998. Mike Myers signed on to replace Sean Penn, who vacated the lead role. However, negotiations with Hogan fell through; Sam Mendes, David Fincher and Darren Aronofsky all became interested in taking over the director's position. Fincher and Myers were fast tracking production for Confessions of a Dangerous Mind in April 2000, but Fincher dropped out and, by that October, Brian De Palma was attached to direct with Renaissance Pictures co-financing. Later that month, Warner Bros. put the project in turnaround, and Myers lost interest. Russell Crowe, Kevin Spacey, and Edward Norton had also been attached to the film in the early development stages.

In December 2000, Ben Stiller was in discussions to star as Chuck Barris, with Bryan Singer directing and Clooney still aboard. However, Stiller was forced to vacate Confessions of a Dangerous Mind due to scheduling conflicts with Zoolander (2001) and The Royal Tenenbaums (2001). Although Singer was interested in Sam Rockwell in the lead role, the director cast Johnny Depp to replace Stiller and commenced pre-production in January 2001 on a planned $35 million budget. Renaissance Pictures was holding international distribution rights, but the filmmakers still needed more financing as well as a studio to cover distribution duties in the United States.

Grosvenor Park was interested in co-financing with Renaissance, but the next month (February 2001), Confessions of a Dangerous Mind was once again stalled in development. Miramax Films had been negotiating for domestic rights, but difficulties arose when Miramax also wanted to cover international rights. Renaissance was also unable to close the financing in time to accommodate both the "production insurance" deadline and the 65-day shooting schedule, which was set to primarily take place in Montreal and British Columbia, Canada. Artisan Entertainment then became interested in covering North American distribution rights but dropped out after the bid went over $8 million. Johnny Depp eventually went to work on other films.

=== Director ===
With Singer busy preparing X2, Confessions of a Dangerous Mind was rejuvenated with Clooney taking over as director. Miramax Films agreed to cover distribution duties and co-finance the film. In the end, funding for Confessions of a Dangerous Mind came from Miramax, Clooney's own Section Eight Productions, Village Roadshow Pictures, producer Andrew Lazar's Mad Chance, Allied Filmmakers, and The Kushner-Locke Company. Clooney explained, "I thought if I came on board as a director, for scale, and was able to bring everybody else on inexpensively, if I could get the film back down to $30 million, then I was going to be able to get the film made. That was a big part of my pitch to Harvey Weinstein at Miramax."

I was upset by the fact that Clooney took the movie from me and then cut me out after that. I'm unhappy with the end result. And I'm unhappy with George Clooney. I had a movie that I wrote and that isn't it. I've always been involved in the process with Spike Jonze and Michel Gondry. If there's any rewriting to do, I do it. But with Clooney it was different; even the end of the movie is different. I mean, Clooney went on forever about how my Confessions screenplay was one of the greatest scripts he'd read. But if someone truthfully felt that way they'd want the person who wrote it to be on board offering their thoughts and criticisms. But Clooney didn't. And I think it's a silly way to be a director.
—Writer Charlie Kaufman

Because Confessions of a Dangerous Mind was his directing debut, Clooney took inspiration from friends Steven Soderbergh and the Coen brothers for his filmmaking style. Writer Charlie Kaufman said he was dissatisfied with the way Clooney treated the screenplay. "I spent a lot of time working on the script," he explained, "but I don't think he was interested in the things I was interested in. I've moved on and I don't have any animosity towards Clooney, but it's a movie I don't really relate to." Clooney acknowledged that Kaufman's original script contained "really funky scenes that would never reach the green light of being a studio film." A drug addiction subplot was removed based on Barris's request for historical authenticity.

Clooney was adamant that Barris become heavily involved during production in an attempt to portray the film from his point of view. Barris was so enthusiastic with Clooney's work on the film that he began writing Bad Grass Never Dies (ISBN 978-0-7867-1379-0), the sequel to Confessions of a Dangerous Mind; Miramax also owns the film rights to Bad Grass. Barris filmed cameo appearances of himself during the shoot in Canada and taped a voice-over in Clooney's house.

When asked about Barris's claim of being a CIA assassin, Clooney commented, "I don't know how much I believed it. I didn't want to officially ask him, because I didn't want him to say, 'I made it up.' I wanted to tell the story and I thought how interesting, if it was all made up, why someone as wealthy and as successful as Chuck Barris would have to do that. I thought that was an interesting person to explore, and that's what we wanted to do with the film."

Clooney acknowledged that his upbringing with father Nick Clooney had a great bearing on his choice of depicting the 1960/70s game shows. "My father had a game show when I was growing up called The Money Maze. I know what those sets look like. I showed the guy how to do cue cards. I grew up on them," the director reflected, "and knew what it looked like and smelled like. And I know something about some of the trappings of fame, so I thought I had a unique take on it."

=== Casting ===
Casting the lead role of Barris was a long, difficult process. "After two months of screen tests and everything I still wasn't able to get Sam Rockwell," Clooney reflected. Rockwell had always been Clooney's first choice ever since they worked together on Welcome to Collinwood (2002). Both Clooney and Barris also believed Rockwell shared an uncanny resemblance to Barris. "I didn't want someone too famous to play the role," the director reasoned. "In my opinion, you cannot have famous people playing famous people. It doesn't work. Sam was the guy for the part, ready to break and hadn't yet."

Prior to his audition, Rockwell "immersed" himself in the role by watching episodes of The Gong Show in an attempt to impress the filmmakers. "I went to LA [and] did an old-fashioned screen test, like a real Scarlett O'Hara-type screen test, which you know they don't really do anymore," the actor remembered. For research, Rockwell spent two and a half months with Barris. "We went to coffee shops and dinner and movies, took walks, went to the zoo; I even filmed him," Rockwell explained. "I had him tape my lines in a tape recorder, and I listened to that to get his voice down."

Clooney cast Julia Roberts as the mysterious CIA agent Patricia Watson due to their positive working relationship in Ocean's Eleven (2001). Her role was originally set for Nicole Kidman, who dropped out over scheduling conflicts with The Hours. After Rockwell's casting, Confessions of a Dangerous Mind was once again briefly postponed; Miramax did not greenlight the film until Roberts signed on. Clooney commented, "Julia really helped me. Her doing the part made it possible for me to cast Sam Rockwell. He can't drive a $28 million film, but Julia certainly can." Renée Zellweger and Gwyneth Paltrow were considered for the Penny Pacino role, which eventually went to Drew Barrymore.

Miramax was unsure of Clooney's decision to cast Rockwell over other famous actors such as Robert Downey Jr., and Ben Stiller. Clooney convinced the studio into giving him the right of final cut privilege and casting Rockwell in exchange for first-look deals on Full Frontal (2002) and other low-budget films from Clooney's Section Eight Productions. Clooney also agreed to cameo in Miramax's Spy Kids 3-D: Game Over (2003) so Rockwell could be cast. To accommodate the $30 million budget, Clooney convinced Roberts and Barrymore to lower their asking prices.

=== Filming ===
Under Clooney's direction, filming was initially set to begin in September 2001, but principal photography did not start until January 14, 2002. From January to March 2002, production for Confessions of a Dangerous Mind took place primarily in California and Montreal. The Playboy Mansion scene was shot in early April at Los Angeles, California; the remaining two weeks of production took place around the Mexico – United States border. Filming for Confessions of a Dangerous Mind ended in late April 2002.

Clooney and cinematographer Newton Thomas Sigel used various techniques when portraying the different decades of Barris's life. "We thought in order to go back in time, most people remember things through film," Clooney reasoned. "I don't remember the 1950s – I wasn't around for them – I know the 50s through Technicolor. Not Technicolor as it was shot, but Technicolor as it has faded now." The filmmakers studied various films and magazine issues of that decade for inspiration on the color palette. Racking focuses were highly stylized for scenes set in the 1960s, similar to the Spaghetti Westerns of that era. Hand-held cameras were used for scenes set in the 1970s, an homage to the films of Sidney Lumet, Mike Nichols and Alan J. Pakula, primarily Klute (1971), Carnal Knowledge (1971), and The Parallax View (1974). Bob Fosse's All That Jazz also influenced Clooney's direction.

Clooney commented that post-production for Confessions of a Dangerous Mind was stressful because he was simultaneously acting in Solaris (2002).

== Reception ==
=== Release ===
To tie in with the release of the film, Miramax Books republished Barris's 1984 book. The film premiered out-of-competition at the May 2002 Cannes Film Festival before Miramax Films gave it a limited release in the United States on December 31, 2002; the wide release came on January 24, 2003. The film only barely recouped its production costs, grossing only $33.01 million, of which $16 million was domestic revenue and $17.01 million came from foreign markets. It was released on VHS and DVD in September 2003. The DVD includes over 20 minutes of deleted scenes, Rockwell's three screen tests, a short documentary titled The Real Chuck Barris, Clooney's audio commentary, and a making-of featurette.

=== Critical response ===
The film received positive responses from critics. On Rotten Tomatoes, the film holds an approval rating of 80% based on 163 reviews, with an average rating of 7.4/10. The site's critical consensus reads: "Rockwell is spot-on as Barris, and Clooney directs with entertaining style and flair." On Metacritic, the film has a weighted average score of 67/100, based on 33 reviews, indicating "generally favorable" reviews. Audiences polled by CinemaScore gave the film an average grade of "C" on an A+ to F scale.

Confessions of a Dangerous Mind was shown at the Berlin International Film Festival on February 10, 2003. Sam Rockwell won the Silver Bear for Best Actor and George Clooney was nominated the Golden Bear but lost to Michael Winterbottom of In This World.

Roger Ebert gave Confessions of a Dangerous Mind a positive review, awarding it 3 1/2 out of 4 stars. "George Clooney's directorial debut is not only intriguing as a story but great to look at," Ebert said, "a marriage of bright pop images from the 1960s and 1970s and dark, cold spyscapes that seem to have wandered in from John le Carré." Peter Travers of Rolling Stone magazine wrote that the film carried a perfect balance of dark humor and psychological drama. "Clooney tackles a far-reaching absurdist fantasy with Barris as a paradigm of paranoia," Travers reviewed. "He wisely hooks up with talent he worked with as an actor: cinematographer Newton Thomas Sigel, from Three Kings (1999), and editor Stephen Mirrione from Ocean's Eleven (2001)."

Mick LaSalle from the San Francisco Chronicle wrote that "there may be more entertaining and less problematic movies, but Confessions of a Dangerous Mind has something about it that hangs in there, working on the mind like a dog gnawing on a table leg. The movie makes a case for itself through sheer oddness and perversity. I'm not sure Confessions is a good movie, but I am sure I like it." Owen Gleiberman, writing in Entertainment Weekly, observed that "Sam Rockwell is handsome in a rumpled, slightly goofy rabbit-toothed way, but he doesn't really have the look, or aura, of a movie star," Gleiberman stated. "He's more like a weirdly sincere space cadet, babbling to himself with puppyish befuddlement, breaking into funky soft dance moves that look as if he's been doing them in his bedroom since he was 8. All of which makes him an inspired choice to play Chuck Barris."

Kenneth Turan of the Los Angeles Times gave a negative review. He disliked the characterization of Chuck Barris and commented that "with its multiplicity of over-stylized looks and slick gimmicks, Dangerous Mind was doubtless more stimulating to direct than it will be for audiences to experience." Internet reviewer James Berardinelli wrote a mixed critique. "George Clooney is eager to show how much he has learned at the hands of the A-list filmmakers he has toiled under. So we get a style that is about 50% Steven Soderbergh and 50% Coen brothers. Sometimes it works, but mostly it comes across as too artsy, with all sorts of bizarre angles and unusual shots."

== Series adaptation ==
In April 2021, a drama series adaptation was reported to be in development at Apple TV+, who won the auction for the script. David Hollander and Jon Worley are signed on as showrunners and executive producers, while Justin Timberlake is attached to play Chuck Barris. Miramax and CBS Studios (now Paramount Television Studios) will produce the series.
