= Don Bleu =

American broadcaster

Don Bleu (real name Rick Kelleher) is a retired American radio personality and former television host. He grew up in East Grand Forks, Minnesota and began his career in 1966, when his friend Shadoe Stevens encouraged him to try radio. He started at KILO in Grand Forks, North Dakota, then moved to KQWB in Fargo, North Dakota. He then moved to the Minneapolis-St. Paul area in 1968 and worked at KDWB for nearly 10 years. His success at KDWB earned him a job at KHJ (AM) in Los Angeles. In 1980, he moved to San Francisco and worked in the adult contemporary radio genre. He hosted a talk-show on a radio station in San Francisco, California, where he was accused of racist jokes and pranks. He was named to the Pavek Museum of Broadcasting's Minnesota Broadcasting Hall of Fame in 2005, and in 2007 he was inducted into the Bay Area Radio Hall of Fame. Bleu initially worked at KIOI until 2011, when he moved to KOSF. He was let go from the latter station and did his last broadcast on June 26, 2015.

== Filmography ==
- The Gong Show (1988-1989, host)
- Know Zone (1995, co-host)

== Awards ==
- Northern California Emmy Award for Outstanding Achievement, Commentary/Analysis (1982)
