= The Big Question (novel) =

2007 novel by Chuck Barris

- Author: Chuck Barris
- Language: English
- Publisher: Simon & Schuster
- Publication date: 2007
- Publication place: U.S.
- Media type: Print (Hardcover)
- Pages: 288 (Hardcover)
- ISBN: 978-1-4165-3525-6

The Big Question is a 2007 novel by Chuck Barris about a game show which airs in 2011.

== Plot summary ==
Contestants compete for the chance to answer a final question that, if answered correctly, will take all their problems away by making them one of the richest people in the world. The downside, though, is that if they get the question wrong, they are executed in prime time. Ultimately, the show is cancelled after three episodes because of a contestant’s death.

== Reception ==
A review by the American Library Association praises the novel as "darkly satirical, witty, and uncomfortably plausible." However a Booklist review says Barris is "more interested in the multiple sad-sack characters who provide myriad digressions than in plot."
