= John Barbour (actor) =

Canadian-born actor and comedian (1933–2026)

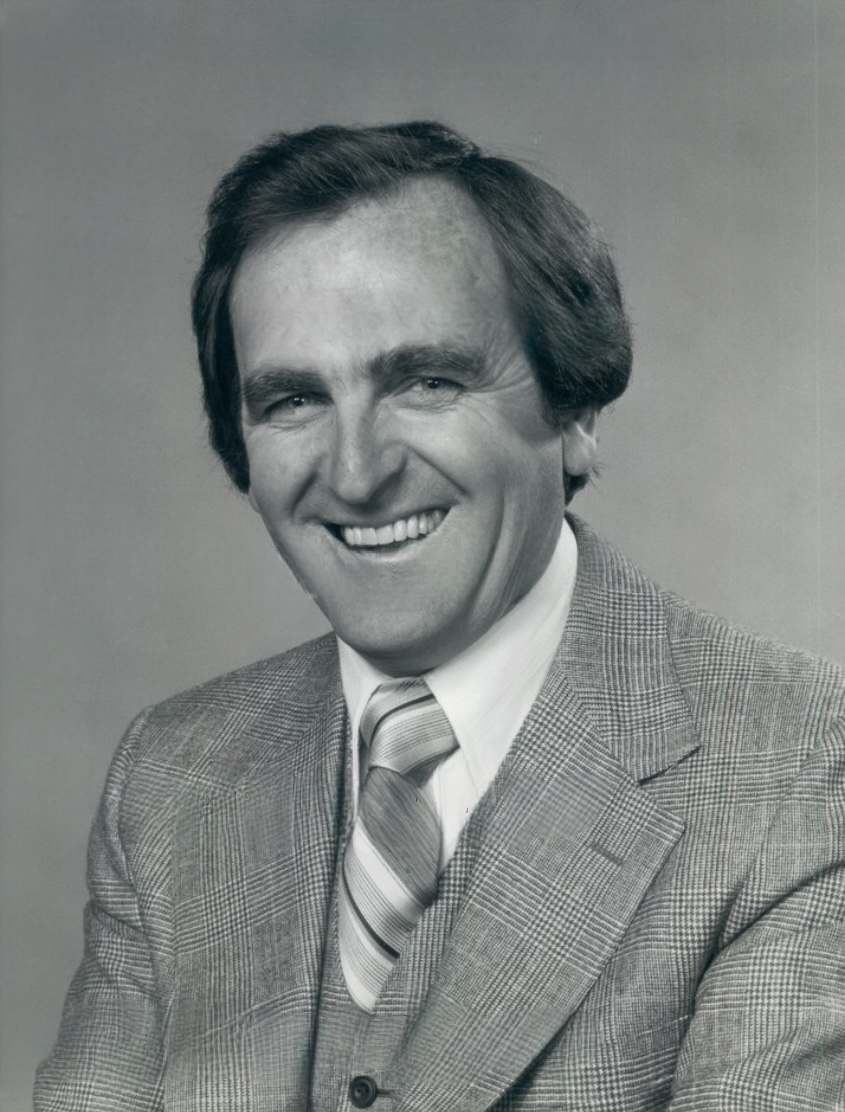
- Barbour in Real People, 1981
- Born: April 24, 1933; Toronto, Ontario, Canada
- Died: May 10, 2026 (aged 93); Las Vegas, Nevada, U.S.
- Occupations: Actor, television host
- Years active: 1955–2026
- Website: http://www.johnbarboursworld.com/

John Barbour (April 24, 1933 – May 10, 2026) was a Canadian actor, comedian, documentarian, and television host who worked extensively in the United States. He was the only performer on television to win Emmys for both entertainment and news shows. Barbour was known as one of the hosts of the NBC reality television series Real People, for which he was also a creator and co-producer.

== Life and career ==
Born in Toronto, Ontario, in Canada on April 24, 1933, Barbour dropped out of high school and moved to the United States in the 1950s. He began his career as a comedian, his comedy act, particularly his 1965 comedy album It's Tough to Be White, dealt in part with civil rights and black-white relations. He released his second comedy album in 1978. He made appearances on The Tonight Show and The Dean Martin Show. Barbour later became the host of AM Los Angeles, during which he received his first Emmy Award. He took an anti-Vietnam War stance, interviewing anti-war activists like Jane Fonda and Muhammad Ali.

He received his other four Emmys when he became host on KNBC, working on its "Critic-At-Large" series of shows. Barbour was perhaps best known for creating, producing and appearing in the hit late 1970s TV show Real People, described as a "pioneering effort in the popularity of reality TV". He also hosted the pilot for The Gong Show in the mid-1970s.

He portrayed game show host Harry Monte in a 1975 episode of Sanford and Son.

Barbour was the executive producer of the game show That **** Quiz Show (That Awful! Quiz Show) hosted by Greg & John Rice in 1982.

He wrote and narrated Keith Burns's documentary Ernie Kovacs: Television's Original Genius.

Barbour also directed and wrote the 1992 documentary The JFK Assassination: The Jim Garrison Tapes. This film covers the investigation by District Attorney Jim Garrison, who, after the 1963 assassination of John F. Kennedy, decided to further investigate the official report given by the Warren Commission. The documentary hypothesizes connections between the assassination and the FBI, the CIA, the Mafia, the Cuban Missile Crisis, the Vietnam War, and other organizations and foreign affairs issues. The film won an award in 1993 at the San Sebastian Film Festival in Spain.

He directed and wrote another documentary, The American Media And The Second Assassination of President John F. Kennedy, which released to specific audiences in 2017, but saw a broader audience in 2019 when it was showcased on iTunes, Vimeo and Amazon. This follow-up documentary is an extension of his critically acclaimed The Garrison Tapes, and has received significant praise for its detail and exposition on the subjects of the JFK murder and the evolution of contemporary fake news. IMDb has scored the documentary 8.6 out of a possible 10.

In 2019 he published his autobiography Your Mother’s Not A Virgin: The Bumpy Life and Times of the Canadian Dropout who Changed the Face of American TV!

Barbour was married to Sarita Ferreira in 1965, and had one son, Christopher. He died at his home in Las Vegas, on May 10, 2026, at the age of 93.
