= The $1.98 Beauty Show =

American game show

- Genre: Game show
- Created by: Chuck Barris
- Directed by: John Dorsey
- Presented by: Rip Taylor
- Announcer: Johnny Jacobs
- Theme music composer: Milton DeLugg
- Country of origin: United States
- No. of seasons: 2
- No. of episodes: 78

Production
- Executive producer: Chuck Barris
- Producer: Paul Pompian
- Camera setup: Multi-camera
- Running time: 22–24 minutes
- Production company: Chuck Barris Productions

Original release
- Release: September 4, 1978 – September 1980

Related
- The Gong Show

The $1.98 Beauty Show is an American game show that aired in syndication from September 1978 to September 1980.

Hosted by Rip Taylor, the series is a parody of beauty contests, and featured six female contestants (including the occasional overweight ones), as well as celebrities Sandra Bernhard, Rhonda Shear, Kitten Natividad, and actress Teresa Ganzel, and on at least one occasion a male dressed in drag competing for the title of "$1.98 Beauty Queen".

Chuck Barris created the series and was executive producer. Johnny Jacobs was the announcer.

== Format ==
Although The $1.98 Beauty Show was staged and played broadly, the format was really a subtle satire where the traditional roles were reversed. The comedian did the announcing, and the announcer told the jokes. The celebrity judges, introduced with great ceremony, contributed nothing during the proceedings and did not speak, even when it came time to announce the winner. The judge seated nearest Rip Taylor would silently hand Taylor an envelope containing the (prearranged) winner's name.

The show consisted of three rounds, during which each contestant was judged by three celebrity panelists. These included Jaye P. Morgan, Jamie Farr, Steve Garvey, Rosey Grier, Patty Andrews, Louis Nye, Peter Lawford, Dorothy Lamour, Marty Allen, Trini Lopez, and the Unknown Comic (all of whom had also served as panelists on The Gong Show). Emcee Taylor introduced the contestants one at a time.

Round 2 featured each contestant showcasing their "abilities". Round 3 was a swimsuit competition, in which Taylor ushered the contestants on stage and announcer Jacobs cracked jokes about their vital statistics and hobbies.

At the end of each show, Taylor announced the "$1.98 Beauty of The Week". That contestant was presented with a tacky plastic crown, a bouquet of rotten vegetables, and the titular cash prize of $1.98, which Taylor dispensed from a coin dispenser on his belt.

The outcome was previously arranged, as was noted in the introductory monologue by the announcer and the fine print of the closing credits of each episode.

Rip Taylor reported that the show was doing well in syndication, but was abruptly canceled by Chuck Barris. "Chuck was at a party one night," recalled Taylor, "and someone said, 'Gee, he has a lot of trash on the air.' He had 17 hours a week of trash, and he got mad and said, 'I'll take it all off the air.' [The $1.98 Beauty Show] was number three in the country before he took it off the air."
