= The Gong Show =

American television series

- Created by: Chuck Barris; Chris Bearde
- Directed by: John Dorsey; Terry Kyne
- Presented by: Chuck Barris; John Barbour; Gary Owens; Don Bleu; Dave Attell; Mike Myers as Tommy Maitland
- Announcer: Johnny Jacobs; Jack Clark; Charlie O'Donnell; Will Arnett
- Composer: Milton DeLugg (musical director)
- Country of origin: United States
- Original language: English
- No. of episodes: 501 (NBC); 104 (syndicated 1976–1980); 185 (syndicated 1988–1989); 20 (ABC)

Production
- Producers: Gene Banks; Diane Fell; Linda Howard
- Production locations: NBC Studios; Burbank, California (1976–78); Golden West Broadcasting; Hollywood, California (1978–80); CBS Television City; Hollywood, California (1988–89); Sony Pictures Studios; Culver City, California (2017–18)
- Running time: 18 minutes (early NBC episodes); 23 minutes; 42 minutes
- Production companies: Chuck Barris Productions (1976–1980); Chris Bearde Productions (1976–1978, 1988–1989); Barris Productions (1988–1989); Barris Industries (1988–1989); Den of Thieves (2017–2018); Sony Pictures Television (2017–2018)

Original release
- Network: NBC
- Release: June 14, 1976 – July 21, 1978
- Network: Syndicated
- Release: September 1976 – September 1980
- Release: September 12, 1988 – May 26, 1989
- Network: ABC
- Release: June 22, 2017 – August 30, 2018

The Gong Show is an American amateur talent contest created by Chuck Barris and Chris Bearde in 1976 and franchised by Sony Pictures Television to many countries.

Each performer was evaluated by a panel of three celebrity judges who could strike a gong to end a performance they disliked. A small cash prize has typically been awarded to each episode's winner. The Gong Show is known for its absurdist humor, and often features amateurish, racy or questionable performers interspersed with more legitimate acts. The actual competition was typically secondary to the outlandish acts, and the series is also known for its free-form style which featured various interruptions, digressions and running jokes.

The Gong Show was broadcast on NBC's daytime schedule from June 14, 1976, through July 21, 1978, and in first-run syndication from 1976 to 1980 and 1988 to 1989, briefly revived in 2008 hosted by Dave Attell, and was revived in 2017 for broadcast on ABC. The show was created and originally produced by Barris, who also served as host for the NBC run and from 1977 to 1980 in syndication. Its most recent version was executive-produced by Will Arnett and hosted by Tommy Maitland, a fictional character performed by Mike Myers (uncredited in Season 1).

== Format ==
Each show presented a competition of amateur performers of often dubious talent, with a panel of three celebrity judges. If any judge considered an act to be particularly bad, they could force it to stop by striking a large gong, a trope adapted from the durable radio show Major Bowes Amateur Hour of the 1930s and 1940s. The host would then ask the judges why they had gonged the act, usually receiving a facetious response. Judges had to let each act run for a set minimum length of time before they could gong it, and any act that ended before reaching this length would be automatically disqualified.

Any act that survived without being gonged was given a score by each of the three judges on a scale of 0 to 10, for a maximum possible score of 30. On the NBC series, the contestant who achieved the highest combined score won the grand prize: a check for $516.32 (a "highly unusual amount", in Barris's words; reportedly the Screen Actors Guild's minimum pay for a day's work at the time) and a "Golden Gong" trophy. In the show's opening monologue, Barris would describe the amount as "five hundred and sixteen big ones, and thirty-two little ones". The syndicated series' top prize was originally $712.05 (the first episode was $996.83) and later increased to one thousand dollars. In the event of a tie, three different tiebreakers were used at various times during the show's run. Originally the studio audience determined the winner by applause, but this was later changed to a decision by the producers, and later by the celebrity judges. On a few, rare occasions, both winning acts each received a check and a trophy. No prize was awarded if all of the acts on a particular episode were gonged, which occurred at least twice. Runners-up received various prizes; Maureen Orth, on her February 24, 1977, appearance, reported receiving a clothes iron valued at $33.95 for her second-place finish.

The original program's regular judges included Jamie Farr, Jaye P. Morgan, Arte Johnson, Patty Andrews, Steve Garvey, Anson Williams, Rex Reed, Pat McCormick, Rip Taylor, Phyllis Diller, Charlie Brill and Mitzi McCall. Throughout the program's run, several other celebrities occasionally appeared as judges including David Letterman, Steve Martin, Mort Sahl, Pat Paulsen, Chuck Woolery, Peter Lawford, David Sheiner, Carl Ballantine, Louis Nye, Allen Ludden, Dick Shawn, Pat Harrington Jr., Abbe Lane, Gary Mule Deer, Ruth Buzzi, Joanne Worley, Michele Lee, Wayland Flowers, Paul Williams, Ken Berry, Soupy Sales, Henny Youngman, Sarah Vaughn, Pearl Bailey, Della Reese, Clifton Davis, Eva Gabor, Sandy Duncan, Rue McClanahan, Candy Clark, Roger Miller, Avery Schreiber, Ronnie Schell, Fred Travalena, Pamela Mason, Charlotte Rae, Milt Kamen, Ed Bernard, Johnny Paycheck, Mabel King, Liz Torres and Willie Bobo.

When Barris announced the final score, actor Jerry Maren (a little person) ran onstage in top hat and tails, throwing confetti while balloons dropped from overhead.

The daily Gong Show also gave out a "Worst Act of the Week" award (later changed to the "Most Outrageous Act of the Week"), selected by the producers and each week's judges. The winner of this award was announced following the trophy presentation on the Friday show, and the performer received a dirty tube sock and a check for $516.32.

=== Legitimate talent ===
Several legitimate performers received early exposure via The Gong Show. Twelve-year-old Andrea McArdle appeared on an early episode in 1976, shortly before she won the leading role in the hit Broadway musical Annie. Following Cheryl Lynn's Gong Show appearance in 1976, she received a recording contract with Columbia Records and recorded the Top 40 disco hit "Got To Be Real", released in 1978. Actress-singer Mare Winningham sang the Beatles song "Here, There, and Everywhere" on the program in 1976, which led to her being signed to an acting contract.

Among the other legitimate talents that appeared on the show were country singer Boxcar Willie; actor Kevin Peter Hall who later appeared as the original Predator in the 1987 film and as Harry in Harry and the Hendersons; comics and actors Paul Reubens and John Paragon (best known as Pee Wee Herman and Jambi the Genie); actor Eddie Deezen; Joey D'Auria ("Dr. Flameo", later WGN's second Bozo the Clown); impressionist/comic Michael Winslow; novelty rock band Green Jellÿ; and an unknown band called The Mystic Knights of the Oingo Boingo which evolved into Oingo Boingo, led by Danny Elfman who later found fame as a composer of film music.

In 1979, street gang leader Stanley Tookie Williams appeared on the show as a bodybuilder shortly before his arrest and subsequent conviction for murder. Dancer Danny Lockin, who had played Barnaby in the film Hello Dolly!, was murdered hours after winning the show taped August 21, 1977. Performer Rhonda Shear appeared on the program in 1979. Journalist Maureen Orth, then writing for Newsweek, won second-place on a 1977 show, appearing as "The World's Oldest Cheerleader."

Longtime urban legend, and some news sources, claimed that football player and coach Brian Billick made an appearance performing a routine known as the "spider monkey", but Billick has confirmed this is untrue.

== Personnel ==
=== Barris as emcee ===
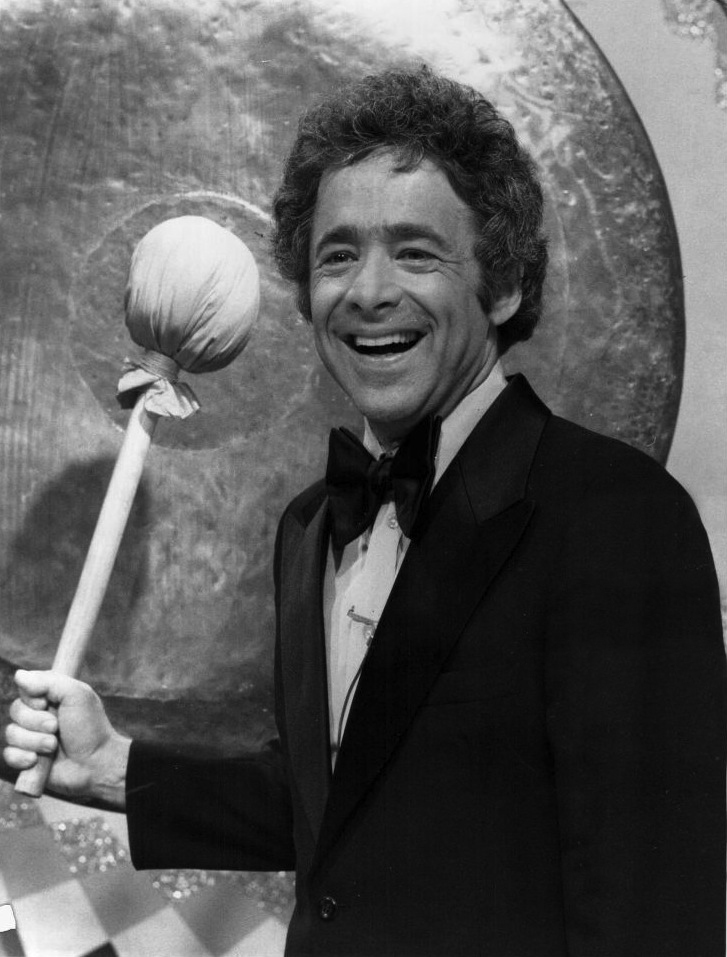
Chuck Barris on the Gong Show set, 1977

An established game show producer (The Dating Game, The Newlywed Game), Barris was originally creator and co-producer of The Gong Show and had no intention of hosting the show himself. Original host John Barbour left the show after taping five episodes, objecting to its satirical concept and pressing for more of a legitimate amateur talent format (Barbour would eventually serve as producer and co-host of the hit NBC Reality TV series, Real People (1979-84)). Following Barbour's departure, NBC informed Barris that he had to host the show himself or it would be cancelled. Initially appearing somewhat stiff and uncomfortable on camera, Barris was soon working so loosely as host that many viewers assumed that he was under the influence of alcohol or other drugs. In a later interview with the Archive of American Television, Barris recounted that he was never intoxicated on camera during The Gong Show and forbade the use of drugs by anyone employed by his production company.

Gary Owens, former announcer on Rowan & Martin's Laugh-In, was engaged as host of the syndicated nighttime version of The Gong Show which debuted in September 1976; Barris replaced Owens as host for the nighttime program for its second season in 1977.

Gong Show Co-Producer Chris Bearde, formerly of Rowan and Martin's Laugh-In and The Sonny & Cher Comedy Hour, soon clashed with Barris over the program's content, favoring more scripted comedy over chaotic nonsense. (Bearde's "new talent" segments on Laugh-In had featured oddball performers, the most celebrated being Tiny Tim.) Bearde resigned from The Gong Show after a heated argument with Barris over the future direction of the program turned violent with the throwing of chairs and other objects and finally came to blows. Barris then became the show's sole producer.

=== Musical direction ===
Milton DeLugg was a popular musician and bandleader during the 1940s and 1950s. He got the Gong Show job by default; as the longtime music director of NBC, he was responsible for any network project that required special music (like the annual telecasts of the Macy's Thanksgiving Day Parade). Although DeLugg had previously arranged the theme for The Newlywed Game, Barris initially regarded him as "an anachronism"; however, Barris was soon pleased to discover that DeLugg's sense of humor was very much kindred to the facetious tone of the show and he appeared alongside Barris in recurring comedy skits as various characters including bad-joke perveyor, "Naso Literatus" and the aged philosopher, "Old Drool".

Veteran composer Joey Carbone provided musical arrangements for the late 1980s revival with his own lineup of studio musicians, known as "The Gong Show Guys".

=== Announcers ===
Johnny Jacobs, who had worked for years as announcer for other Barris game shows, served as the main announcer on the Gong Show from 1976 to 1980. When Jacobs was sidelined with an extended illness, Jack Clark substituted from October 3 through December 23, 1977. Charlie O'Donnell served as announcer for the late 1980s revival.

=== Hostesses and regulars ===
The regular hostess of the Gong Show was Siv Åberg (a former Miss Sweden, model and actress who also appeared on Barris' syndicated New Treasure Hunt); other hostesses included actresses Marlena Clark and Markie Post, porn star Carol Connors and Barris' teenage daughter, Della. Some episodes would also have a special guest introduce Barris, ranging from celebrities such as Dick Van Dyke, Carol Burnett and Kate Jackson to show staffers and their relatives, including Jerry Maren's wife Elizabeth and Barris' own grandmother.

The Gong Show featured several regular performers who were not eligible to win the daily competition. The most popular of these were Gene Gene the Dancing Machine (Gene Patton), an NBC stagehand who impressed Barris with his energetic dancing; and The Unknown Comic, the alter ego of comedian Murray Langston who told intentionally corny jokes while dressed in frowsy attire and wearing a brown paper bag with cutout eyes and mouth, over his head.

== Broadcast history ==
=== NBC ===
The Gong Show debuted on NBC on June 14 1976 at 12:30 p.m. (11:30 a.m. Central and Pacific). At that time, this was the network's least important time slot, as programs had to share the half-hour with a five-minute NBC newscast anchored by Edwin Newman. As a result, the first six-plus months of The Gong Show featured approximately twenty minutes of program content in a twenty-five-minute episode.

Many NBC affiliates in some larger markets opted not to run network programming during the noon hour at all, preferring to broadcast local news and talk shows instead. Thus The Gong Show made its debut mainly on medium-market and smaller stations or on large-market rival stations that had picked up the program from the NBC affiliate that had rejected it. For example, in Boston, then-NBC affiliate WBZ-TV did not run the program, allowing local UHF independent outlet WSBK-TV to broadcast it.

The Gong Show's time slot was given to a new soap opera, Lovers and Friends, on January 3, 1977, and the show replaced the cancelled Another World spinoff Somerset at 4:00 p.m. The time change allowed The Gong Show to expand to a full half-hour.

NBC broadcast a one-hour prime-time Gong Show special on April 26, 1977, featuring in-studio special guests Tony Randall, Alice Cooper, and Harry James and His Orchestra. The winning act on this special was The Bait Brothers, and the panelists were Jaye P. Morgan, Jamie Farr, and Arte Johnson.

==== "Popsicle Twins" incident ====
During The Gong Show's run, Barris became well known for his clashes with the network censors, intentionally bringing in risqué acts as a diversion to allow some of the other questionable acts to slip by. On the September 20, 1977 episode, one of these so-called "bait acts", titled "Have You Got a Nickel?", unexpectedly made it onto the show. The act consisted of two teenage girls, both clad in shorts, sitting cross-legged on the stage floor and silently eating popsicles in a manner that suggested they were performing fellatio on the frozen treats. The nature of their act led to the two girls being referred to as the "Popsicle Twins".

While the girls were able to complete their act without being gonged, they were given low scores by two of the judges. Phyllis Diller gave them a zero (the only zero an act on the show ever received), while Jamie Farr followed with a marginally better 2. Jaye P. Morgan awarded them a 10, quipping, "Do you know that's the way I started (in show business)?" and proceeded to eat one of the girls' popsicles.

The girls' act was approved by the NBC censors, who apparently did not see anything wrong with it during the rehearsals. However, after the episode was broadcast in the Eastern and Central time zones, NBC received several complaints from viewers and responded by cutting the act from the later tape delay broadcast for western time zones. Alerted to the content, KNBC in Los Angeles was able to preempt it and substitute a public service announcement during that segment of the program. When questioned about the situation at the time, a spokesman for Barris replied that the host had no comment on the incident. The act was not cut from all the tapes, and the "Popsicle Twins" incident has been seen in reruns, retrospectives and The Gong Show Movie (1980). Barris said in a 2001 interview with Salon that this particular act made him consider leaving his career.

==== Cancellation ====
Despite its popularity and respectable ratings for a non-soap-opera midday show, NBC cancelled The Gong Show, with its final episode broadcast on July 21, 1978. At the time, there was much speculation as to the network's true motivations for dumping the popular show. According to Barris, NBC's official reason was because of both "lower than expected ratings" and a desire by the network to "re-tailor the morning shows to fit the standard morning demographics" (the move coincided with the arrival of new NBC president Fred Silverman, who was well known for such programming overhauls and reportedly disliked The Gong Show). America Alive!, a magazine-style variety program hosted by Art Linkletter's son Jack, replaced Gong, along with daytime reruns of Sanford and Son, which also debuted on the same day as the premiere of The Gong Show.

Following the cancellation, many critics and industry analysts – including Gene Shalit and Rona Barrett – reported having heard from anonymous sources within the NBC programming department that the true reason behind the cancellation was Barris's refusal to tone down the increasingly risqué nature of the show. According to the sources, after the "Popsicle Twins" incident and an episode in which Jaye P. Morgan spontaneously exposed her breasts on air during a Gene Gene the Dancing Machine segment, Barris had been given an ultimatum by the network's Standards and Practices department to deliver less racy shows for his audience, which included many younger viewers, or NBC would cancel the program.

==== Finale ====
After informing Barris of the impending cancellation, NBC allowed him to continue The Gong Show for the rest of his contract. Barris made no perceptible change in preparation for the program's final show of the NBC run on July 21, 1978. The celebrity judges for the NBC finale of The Gong Show were Jamie Farr, Patty Andrews and Carl Ballantine; staff member Larry Gotterer appeared as "Fenwick Gotterer" to host after Barris began the final show with a "Chuckie's Fables" sketch. The rest of the final episode tried to explain the life of the show and its cancellation. Barris managed to have the last word on the show's demise, appearing as a contestant. Playing in a country music band called "The Hollywood Cowboys" with the house band's rhythm section, Barris sang a slightly modified version of Johnny Paycheck's "Take This Job and Shove It", giving NBC the finger during the song to accentuate his point. NBC censored the gesture, with the word "OOPS!" superimposed over a still shot of the set. Barris was gonged by Jamie Farr, who quipped, "That little fella's been saying that I've been long a nose, I'm also long a gong, fella."

The last act on the show, the group "Lobster Repair", performed Harry Belafonte's song "Day-O" and won the final $516.32 and trophy of the NBC era. Gotterer presented the award and Barris closed the show by thanking the crew and bringing Gene, Gene the Dancing Machine and Jaye P. Morgan onto the stage; Morgan had been banned from appearing on the show by NBC in September 1977, after exposing her breasts on air.

=== Syndication (1976–80) ===
Immediately after taping the final NBC episode, Barris was evicted from NBC's Burbank studios and The Gong Show set was moved to the studios of Golden West Broadcasters (now Sunset Bronson Studios) in Hollywood. Production of the syndicated nighttime/weekend version of The Gong Show continued there for two years. The entire syndicated run from September 1976 to September 1980 was distributed by Firestone Program Services. While the series eventually met its demise in syndication as it had on NBC, according to Barris, the problem did not lie with any outrageous acts, but instead the controversy and public outcry over another series he had produced.

In September 1979, Barris launched the game show Three's a Crowd, which was a spin-off of The Newlywed Game. Instead of recently married couples trying to match answers, the wives and secretaries of married men would compete to show who knew the men better. Religious activists and feminist groups protested against Three's a Crowd and its ratings eventually forced the show's cancellation during the middle of the season.

In Barris's autobiography The Game Show King, he wrote that "the public backlash from Three's a Crowd not only caused the program to be canceled, but it took three other TV shows of mine with it. I went to my house in Malibu and stayed there for a year." The Gong Show was one of those shows to be canceled, and Barris never hosted another series. The trauma from the Three's a Crowd's backlash was so severe, in the last several weeks of The Gong Show, Barris reportedly had "a small nervous breakdown" on-air, because he was "bored to death" with broadcasting. His next two series, revivals of the 1960s game show Camouflage (the replacement for Three's a Crowd) and his 1973–77 series Treasure Hunt (in which Barris had practically no involvement, according to host Geoff Edwards), both failed to find audiences and Barris went further into his self-imposed exile from television. Barris would not have another hit series until the 1985 syndication revival of The Newlywed Game.

Reruns of the NBC Gong Show began in syndication during the autumn of 1979. In the 1980s, the NBC and syndicated episodes were rerun on the USA Network and later, the Game Show Network, although by the time GSN picked up the series, many episodes had to be edited or were not broadcast due to musical performance clearance issues. No episodes from the first syndicated season of The Gong Show, hosted by Gary Owens, have been seen since their original broadcast.

=== Later incarnations ===
A syndicated weekday revival of The Gong Show, hosted by San Francisco disc jockey Don Bleu, ran during the 1988–89 season from September 12, 1988, to May 26, 1989, with reruns airing through September 15. Each winner was paid $701. The last show of the Don Bleu's revival is dedicated for a long-week tribute to France.

Extreme Gong, a later incarnation of The Gong Show on the Game Show Network had viewers vote on its acts by telephone. It was hosted by George Gray and ran from October 5, 1998, to August 27, 1999, with reruns continuing to air up until Fall of 2000. Winners received $317.69. This version was well known for two known incidents: one episode featuring "Cody the Talking Dog" for which he tried to say things like "I love you" and "ice cream" but did not succeed in talking, and another featuring a Village People parody as The Village Little People where they sang a cover of "YMCA". Orange County comedy punk band the Radioactive Chicken Heads (then called Joe & the Chicken Heads) made their national television debut on Extreme Gong, though they were gonged midway through their performance. Near the end of the show's run, an hour-long "Tournament of Talent" special was aired in August 1999, with twelve previous winning acts (chosen by viewers via a phone-in poll) competing for a payoff of $10,000.

Comedy Central debuted a new incarnation called The Gong Show with Dave Attell, which lasted for eight weeks in the summer of 2008. The show's format was similar to the original, but its scoring was based on a scale of 0 to 500, and winning acts received $600. The $600 was shown as paid in cash on the spot, rather than being paid by check as in earlier versions, but in reality (because of contestant eligibility regulations by Sony) was paid as a check from Sony Pictures. In place of a typical trophy, winners were awarded a belt in the style of boxing championship belts.

A live stage version of The Gong Show took place at B.B. King's Blues Club, in the Times Square district of New York City on August 12, 2010. It was produced by The Radio Chick, and is the Sony authorized stage production. This production went into development in 2011–12 and now runs regularly in New York City, with engagements in other U.S. cities.

==== 2017 revival ====
On October 3, 2016, ABC and Sony Pictures announced a 10-episode summer 2017 revival of The Gong Show executive produced by Will Arnett.

The broadcast of the 2017 revival premiered on ABC on June 22, 2017, hosted by previously unknown "British comedian" Tommy Maitland. Maitland was, in fact, a character portrayed by Mike Myers, although neither ABC nor Myers confirmed this and ABC officially credited Maitland as host and executive producer. Maitland's catchphrase was "Who's a cheeky monkey?" He also periodically used Barris's "back with more stuff" catchphrase to lead into commercials.

Celebrity guest judges for the 2017 revival included Arnett, Zach Galifianakis, Alison Brie, Andy Samberg, Elizabeth Banks, Tracee Ellis Ross, Joel McHale, Megan Fox, Courteney Cox, Dana Carvey, Will Forte, Jack Black, Jennifer Aniston, Ken Jeong, Fred Armisen, Maya Rudolph and Anthony Anderson. Among the more notable acts featured on the revival are the Radioactive Chicken Heads, making their second appearance on a Gong Show incarnation since Extreme Gong in 1998. The first season of this version also features a regular segment featuring a staff performer leading the audience in a sing-along of the novelty song "Shaving Cream", reminiscent of the recurring gag acts on the earlier version.

The winner of each show received a gong trophy and an oversized check in the amount of US$2,000.17, later increased by a penny the following year. The final episode of the first season featured a memorial to Barris, who died prior to the series' premiere in 2017.

On January 8, 2018, ABC announced that the revival would be picked up for a second season, officially confirmed Myers as the portrayer of Maitland and crediting Myers as an executive producer by name. The second (and final) season premiered on June 21, 2018. Celebrity guest judges for season 2 included Jimmy Kimmel, Jason Sudeikis, Brad Paisley, Dana Carvey, Alyson Hannigan, Ken Jeong, Kristen Schaal, and Rob Riggle. However, the series was not renewed for a third season and was quietly cancelled.

=== Film ===
In May, 1980, Universal Pictures released The Gong Show Movie to scathing reviews and such poor box office performance, the film was withdrawn from general release within one week. Advertising proclaimed it as "The Gong Show That Got Gonged by the Censor". It was seen periodically on cable TV, but was never released on home video until March 29, 2016, after the film, which achieved cult status was released on Blu-ray by Shout! Factory.

Confessions of a Dangerous Mind, a film directed by George Clooney and written by Charlie Kaufman, was based on the semi-fictional autobiography of the same name by Chuck Barris. Part of the film chronicles the making of The Gong Show, and features several clips from the original series.

Following the success of the print and screen versions of Confessions, GSN produced a documentary called The Chuck Barris Story: My Life on the Edge, which included rare footage from the Gary Owens pilot.

== International versions ==
Country	Local name	Host	Network	Year aired
Australia	The Gong Show	Tim Evans	Network Ten	1976
Chile	¿Y usted qué hace? (Segment on Sábados Gigantes)	Don Francisco	Canal 13	1983
Germany	Die Gong-Show	Paul Kuhn; Götz Alsmann; Marco Ströhlein	NDR; RTL; Sat.1	1981; 1992–93; 2003
India	Sabse Badhkar Gong	?	Sony TV	mid-1990s
Indonesia	Gong Show	Arie Untung and Fenita Arie	Trans TV	2006–12
Indonesia	Gong Show Indonesia	Gracia Indri	RCTI	2019–20
New Zealand	The Gong Show	Jeremy Corbett and Nigel Corbett	TV2	August 9, 1997 – February 28, 1998
Thailand	ก็องโชว์	Shahkrit Yamnam	iTV	2003
United Kingdom	The Gong Show	Frankie Howerd	Southern Television; Channel 4	1977 (pilot); December 9, 1985 (pilot)
United States (original format)	The Gong Show	Chuck Barris	NBC	1976–78
United States (original format)	The Gong Show	Gary Owens; Chuck Barris; Don Bleu	Syndication	1976–77; 1977–80; 1988–89
United States (original format)	Extreme Gong	George Gray	GSN	1998–99
United States (original format)	The Gong Show with Dave Attell	Dave Attell	Comedy Central	July 17, 2008 – September 4, 2008
United States (original format)	The Gong Show	Tommy Maitland (Mike Myers)	ABC	June 22, 2017 – August 30, 2018

== Spin-offs ==
At the height of the Gong Show's popularity, NBC gave Barris a prime-time variety hour, The Chuck Barris Rah Rah Show. This was played somewhat more seriously than the Gong Show, with Jaye P. Morgan singing straight pop songs as in her nightclub and recording days, and bygone headliners like Slim Gaillard reprising their old hits for a studio audience. Other spinoffs include The $1.98 Beauty Show hosted by Rip Taylor.

== See also ==
- Minutes to Fame, a similar Hong Kong talent show
