= The Gong Show Movie =

1980 film

- Directed by: Chuck Barris
- Written by: Chuck Barris; Robert Downey
- Based on: The Gong Show by Chris Bearde
- Produced by: Budd Granoff
- Starring: Chuck Barris; Robin Altman; James B. Douglas; Mabel King; Jaye P. Morgan; Rip Taylor
- Cinematography: Richard C. Glouner
- Edited by: Jacqueline Cambas; James Mitchell; Sam Vitale
- Music by: Milton DeLugg
- Distributed by: Universal Pictures
- Release date: May 23, 1980
- Running time: 89 minutes
- Country: United States
- Language: English
- Box office: $6.6 million

The Gong Show Movie is a 1980 American slapstick film starring, co-written and directed by Chuck Barris, host of the game show of the same name.

== Plot ==
The film shows a fictional week in the life of Chuck Barris as the host and creator of The Gong Show, through a series of outrageous competitors, stressful situations, a nervous breakdown (which compels him to run away and hide in the Moroccan desert) and other comic hijinks in his life and work on the TV show. Among the highlights included a group of men dressed as a Roman Catholic priest and three nuns lip-synching Tom Lehrer's song "The Vatican Rag", a man blowing out a candle with flatulence, and the uncensored version of Jaye P. Morgan's infamous breast-baring incident.

== Reception ==
The film premiered in May 1980 alongside The Empire Strikes Back and The Shining, beating the latter at the box office in its opening weekend but losing to the former. The film received uniformly negative reviews and was withdrawn from most theaters just days after its release.

== Home media ==
The movie was occasionally seen on cable television during the 1980s but was long out of print until it was released on Blu-ray in 2016.
