= Chris Bearde =

British-born writer, director, and producer

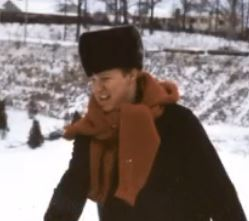
- Bearde in 1963
- Born: Christopher D. F. Beard; 18 June 1936; Richmond, London, England
- Died: 23 April 2017 (aged 80); Westlake Village, California, U.S.
- Occupations: Writer, producer, and director
- Writing career
- Genre: Comedy
- Notable works: Rowan & Martin's Laugh-In; The Gong Show
- Notable awards: Emmy Award, a Golden Globe Award, and a Writers Guild of America Award

Chris Bearde (18 June 1936 – 23 April 2017) was a British-born comedy writer, producer and director best known for his work as a writer on Rowan & Martin's Laugh-In and for co-writing and producing television specials for Elvis Presley, Bob Hope, Sonny & Cher, Bill Cosby, Steve Martin, Jim Carrey, Andy Williams, The Jackson 5, The Osmonds, Dinah Shore, Diana Ross, and Lucille Ball. He also created the format for the original Gong Show and a number of network and pay-cable comedy series including That's My Mama and Sherman Oaks.

== Early career ==
Bearde's career started in the 1950s in his adopted home, Sydney, Australia. After working in radio and serving two years in the Australian Army, at age 23, he became host of the children's television series Smalltime.

His appearances in this show and his writing for other Australian comedy shows were recognised by visiting Canadian and American producers, and Bearde was contracted by the Canadian commercial network CTV to write a comedy series in the early 1960s, entitled Network. He created two shows for the Canadian Broadcasting Corporation, Front and Centre and Canada's first late night political satire show Nightcap.

== Move to Hollywood ==
After four years of working in Canadian radio and television, Bearde was signed by the William Morris Agency and moved to Hollywood. There, he created formats for several specials for NBC and ABC. Bearde's method of combining slapstick and political satire made him a resident writer on the original Rowan & Martin's Laugh-In.

While working with the producer of Rowan & Martin's Laugh-In, George Schlatter, Bearde created the formats for specials, including Dinah Shore's Like Hep! (1969), and The Grammy Awards. In 1968, he formed a partnership with Canadian producer Allan Blye, and they created the format for the 1968 TV special Singer Presents... Elvis (the "'68 Comeback Special") for producer Bob Finkel and director Steve Binder. Bearde and Blye co-produced several specials for Andy Williams and produced two years of The Andy Williams Show from 1969 to 1971. Blye and Bearde also created a summer series, The Who Is Ray Stevens Show, which featured the first appearance of Steve Martin. Blye and Bearde also created and produced one of the first black situation comedies, That's My Mama, for ABC.

After splitting with Blye, Bearde created the format of – and produced with Chuck Barris – The Bobby Vinton Show and the first breakthrough talent reality television show, The Gong Show. Although Bearde later sold his interest in the 1970s version of the program to Barris, Bearde's company produced a one-season revival of the show in 1988. He also produced The Bob Hope Christmas Show and returned to Australia to produce Texaco Presents Bob Hope in Australia.

Bearde formed a partnership with ex-CBS president Robert Wood and created pilots and a children's series, The W.A.C.K.O. Show, for CBS. Bearde directed a comedy film called Hysterical, released in 1983, starring The Hudson Brothers. Bearde formed a long-term partnership with Dick Clark and produced The Half Hour Comedy Hour, which featured the first national appearance of Arsenio Hall as a host. Clark and Bearde co-produced Bearde's lip sync hit series Puttin' on the Hits in 1985.

Bearde formed a co-production partnership with Vin Di Bona, the producer of America's Funniest Home Videos. He created and produced HBO's cult series satirizing television news Night Rap and Showtime's comedy hit Sherman Oaks. Di Bona and Bearde also produced several specials for CBS.

== Move to Las Vegas ==
In 2005, Bearde moved his operation to Las Vegas and created and trademarked "Chris Bearde's International Comedy Hall of Fame", a 30,000 sq ft (3,000 m^{2}) entertainment retail restaurant and comedy tribute exhibition complex, currently in the design and planning stages. Each year, there are several Comedy Awards and Induction Ceremony TV specials included in the package.

Bearde has received an Emmy Award, and a Writers Guild of America Award. The Chris Bearde School of Comedy was founded in Las Vegas in 2007 and moved to Los Angeles in 2008. The school is still in operation.

== Death ==
Bearde died at his home in Westlake Village, California of a cardiac arrest on 23 April 2017 at the age of 80. He is survived by his wife, Carolyn Stonecloud; six children; two stepchildren; and seven grandchildren.
