= Johnny Jacobs =

American game show announcer (1916–1982)

- Johnny Jacobs in Batman 1966
- Born: John Byron Jacobs; June 22, 1916; Milwaukee, Wisconsin
- Died: February 8, 1982 (aged 65); Stockton, California
- Occupation: Announcer

John Byron Jacobs (June 22, 1916 – February 8, 1982) was an American television announcer, often for Chuck Barris productions—namely, The Newlywed Game and The Dating Game.

== Early life ==
He was born in Wisconsin.

== Early career ==
=== Radio ===
Jacobs was the announcer for The Steve Allen Show on CBS in 1950. The program was a summer replacement for Our Miss Brooks, which starred Eve Arden. In 1952–1953, he was the announcer for The Doris Day Show on CBS. In 1955, he was the announcer for the Gary Crosby Show on CBS.

=== Television ===
In the early 1950s, he was the emcee of a television show called Bachelor's Haven. Also, he was the original announcer for the last season of I Love Lucy, in 1956. He was a regular on Betty White's comedy show in 1958 and did announcing work for the early 1960s revival of The Steve Allen Show. Other shows he worked on included the Gene Autry Show and the Dinah Shore Show. Throughout his career, he occasionally acted in television shows, making guest appearances on Batman (episode 3), Leave It to Beaver and The Munsters. He also appeared, as himself, in The Gong Show Movie.

== Game shows and final years ==
He was the first announcer for The Joker's Wild, which starred Jack Barry and debuted on CBS in 1972. Barry employed Jacobs to announce many such Jack Barry/Barry & Enright Productions game shows during the early to middle 1970s as Blank Check, the 1976 ABC run of Break The Bank, and Hollywood's Talking for CBS.

Most notably, however, Chuck Barris employed Jacobs's voice talents on the aforementioned The Newlywed Game and The Dating Game, and also for other such Barris productions as The Gong Show, Three's a Crowd and The $1.98 Beauty Show. His last job was announcing a Barris-produced version of Treasure Hunt which was syndicated during the 1981-82 season (Jacobs had also announced the 1970s syndicated version of Treasure Hunt as well). However, illness forced him to step down from this version of Treasure Hunt by late 1981, and he was replaced by frequent Barris fill-in announcer Tony McClay.

Jacobs died in Stockton, California, where he owned radio station KWG, at the age of 65.

== Filmography ==
Year	Title	Role	Notes
1951-1957	I Love Lucy	Announcer	32 episodes, Uncredited
1957	Deep Adventure	Narrator	
1963	Leave It to Beaver	Mr. Thornton	Episode: "Beaver on TV"
1965	The Munsters	TV Announcer	Episode: "Country Club Munsters"
1966	Batman	Asst. Shop Owner	Episode: "Fine Feathered Finks"
