= 1951 in music =

This is a list of notable events in music that took place in the year 1951.

== Specific locations ==
- 1951 in British music
- 1951 in Norwegian music

== Specific genres ==
- 1951 in country music
- 1951 in jazz

== Events ==
- January 29 – Nilla Pizzi wins the first annual Sanremo Music Festival with "Grazie dei fiori".
- February 22 – The first complete performance of Charles Ives's Symphony No. 2, written between 1897 and 1902, is given in Carnegie Hall by the New York Philharmonic orchestra, conducted by Leonard Bernstein.
- March 3-5 – Jackie Brenston "and His Delta Cats" (actually Ike Turner's Kings of Rhythm) record "Rocket 88" at Sam Phillips' Sun Studio in Memphis, Tennessee, a candidate for the first rock and roll record (released in April).
- March 5 – The Suk Trio, consisting of Josef Suk (violinist), Jiří Hubička (pianist) and Saša Večtomov (cellist), make their debut, at the Rudolfinum Hall in Prague (Czechoslovakia).
- April 4 – Frankie Laine, newly signed by Columbia Records, becoming the highest paid vocalist of his day, immediately justifies his new contract by recording the double-sided megahit "Jezebel"/"Rose, Rose, I Love You", the latter being the only major popular music chart hit in the United States written by a Chinese composer (Chen Gexin).
- April 18 – An article entitled "The Fight Against Formalism in Art and Literature, for a Progressive German Culture" appears in the Tägliche Rundschau, official daily of the Soviet Government in Germany, promulgating the new cultural policy of the DDR.
- May 9–26 – The Queen Elisabeth Competition for violin is held (for the first time under that name) in Brussels, Belgium. Leonid Kogan is awarded first prize.
- June 9 – Joseph Haydn's opera L'anima del filosofo, better known by its alternative title Orfeo ed Euridice and written in 1791–92, is given its world premiere at the Maggio Musicale Fiorentino.
- June 14 – Bill Haley and His Saddlemen record their version of "Rocket 88", combining the rhythm and blues arrangement of the version recorded in early March by Jackie Brentson with country music trappings.
- June 22 – July 10 – Darmstädter Internationale Ferienkurse held in Darmstadt.
- July 2–14 – The seventh annual Cheltenham Music Festival is held in Cheltenham, England, with a performance of Brian Easdale's opera The Sleeping Children, premieres of the first symphonies of Malcolm Arnold, John Gardner and Arnold van Wyk, Franz Reizenstein's Serenade for Winds and Maurice Jacobson's Symphonic Suite, as well as performances of works by Humphrey Searle, Robert Masters, Benjamin Frankel and Philip Sainton.
- July 11 – Disc jockey and music promoter Alan Freed broadcasts his first Rhythm and blues radio programme from station WJW in Cleveland, Ohio. Freed uses the term rock and roll to describe R&B, in an effort to introduce the music to a broader white audience.
- July 14–21 – The Haslemere Music Festival, consisting of six concerts of early music, takes place in Haslemere, England.
- July 29 – The annual Bayreuth Festival resumes for the first time since the Second World War, now under the general direction of Wieland Wagner, with an opening concert of Beethoven's Symphony No. 9 conducted by Wilhelm Furtwängler, followed by productions of Der Ring des Nibelungen, Parsifal and Die Meistersinger.
- August – The annual Salzburg Festival takes place in Salzburg, Austria, featuring four opera productions from the Vienna State Opera: Mozart's Idomeneo and Die Zauberflöte and Verdi's Otello, all conducted by Wilhelm Furtwängler, and Berg's Wozzeck, conducted by Karl Böhm, as well as seven orchestral concerts by the Vienna Philharmonic (two conducted by Wilhelm Furtwängler and one each by Edwin Fischer, Rafael Kubelík, Eugen Jochum, Karl Böhm, and Leopold Stokowski), six choral concerts, four chamber-music concerts, three solo recitals, and a number of smaller events.
- September 5 – Opening of the month-long Berlin Festival of the Arts, with a performance in the New Schillertheater of Beethoven's Symphony No. 9 by the Berlin Philharmonic conducted by Wilhelm Furtwängler. Subsequent musical events include performances of Gian Carlo Menotti's The Consul, Benjamin Britten's Let's Make an Opera and the first German performance of Oklahoma!.
- September 11 – The Rake's Progress, an opera by Igor Stravinsky with libretto by W. H. Auden and Chester Kallman, premieres in Venice, conducted by the composer.
- September 17–22 – The fourth annual Swansea Festival of Music and the Arts opens in Swansea, Wales, with a controversial speech by one of Wales's leading composers, Daniel Jones. The festival is the final component in the Festival of Britain and consists of seven programmes, featuring Welsh composer Arwel Hughes's new oratorio St. David and appearances by Victoria de los Ángeles, Zino Francescatti, André Navarra, Walter Susskind and Jean Martinon.
- October 6–7 – The Donaueschinger Musiktage features the world premieres of Ernst Krenek's Double Concerto for viola, piano, and small orchestra, Rolf Liebermann's Piano Sonata, Pierre Boulez's Polyphonie X for 18 solo instruments, Hermann Reutter's Der himmlische Vagant, lyrische Portrait des F. Villon von Klabund for alto and baritone voices and instrumental ensemble, and Marcel Mihalovici's Étude en deux parties for piano and ensemble, as well as German first performances of works by Messiaen, Guido Turchi, Harsányi, Jelinek, and Honegger, and a performance of Henze's Third Symphony.
- October 21 – Opening of a "Festival of Music and the Arts" at Wexford in Ireland, the forerunner of Wexford Festival Opera.
- October 22 – Reopening of the Royal Opera House, London, with a production of Puccini's Turandot, conducted by Sir John Barbirolli and with Gertrude Grob-Prandl in the title role.
- November 29 – December 3 – The Hamburg Radio Symphony Orchestra, conducted by Hans Schmidt-Isserstedt, plays four concerts in London as part of a thirteen-concert tour of England and Ireland.
- December 7 – Opening of the opera season at La Scala in Milan, three weeks earlier than the traditional date of December 26, with a double-bill consisting of Verdi's I vespri siciliani and Stravinsky's The Rake's Progress.
- December 28 - John Serry collaborates with Nicola Paone (the "Italian Bing Crosby") in a recording for RCA Victor In New York City.

== Albums released ==
- Ballin' the Jack – Georgia Gibbs
- Beloved Hymns – Bing Crosby
- Bing and the Dixieland Bands – Bing Crosby
- Bing Sings Victor Herbert – Bing Crosby
- Blue Period – Miles Davis
- Country Style – Bing Crosby
- Dig – Miles Davis
- Down Memory Lane – Bing Crosby
- Folk Song Favorites – Patti Page
- Go West, Young Man – Bing Crosby
- Historically Speaking – Gerry Mulligan
- Hoop-De-Doo – Ames Brothers
- I'll See You in My Dreams – Doris Day
- In the Evening by the Moonlight – Ames Brothers
- Let's Polka – Frank Yankovic Orchestra (Pontiac Records PLP-520)
- Lullaby of Broadway – Doris Day
- Music, Maestro Please – Frankie Laine
- On Moonlight Bay – Doris Day
- One for My Baby – Frankie Laine
- Porgy and Bess – Various Artists
- Precious Memories – Bill Kenny
- Sentimental Me – Ames Brothers
- Sweet Leilani – Ames Brothers
- Teresa Brewer – Teresa Brewer
- Two Tickets to Broadway – Dinah Shore
- Way Back Home – Bing Crosby
- Wonderful Words – The Mills Brothers

== US No 1 hit singles ==
These singles reached the top of US Billboard magazine's charts in 1951.

First week	Number of weeks	Title	Artist
March 3, 1951	1	"If"	Perry Como
March 10, 1951	1	"Be My Love"	Mario Lanza
March 17, 1951	5	"If"	Perry Como
April 21, 1951	9	"How High the Moon"	Les Paul & Mary Ford
June 23, 1951	5	"Too Young"	Nat King Cole
July 28, 1951	6	"Come On-a My House"	Rosemary Clooney
September 8, 1951	8	"Because of You"	Tony Bennett
November 3, 1951	6	"Cold, Cold Heart"	Tony Bennett
December 15, 1951	2	"(It's No) Sin"	Eddy Howard
December 29, 1951	11	"Cry"	Johnnie Ray & The Four Lads

== Biggest hit singles ==
The following songs achieved the highest chart positions in the limited set of charts available for 1951.

#	Artist	Title	Year	Country	Chart entries
1	Johnnie Ray	Cry	1951	US	US 1940s 1 – Dec 1951, US 1 for 11 weeks Dec 1951, US BB 2 of 1951, DDD 4 of 1951, RYM 5 of 1951, POP 6 of 1952, Italy 68 of 1955, Acclaimed 1084
2	Nat King Cole	Unforgettable	1951	US	US BB 1 of 1952, POP 1 of 1952, RYM 4 of 1951, US 1940s 14 – Nov 1951, DDD 25 of 1951, Europe 63 of the 1950s, Scrobulate 78 of vocal, WXPN 500
3	Les Paul & Mary Ford	How High the Moon	1951	US	US 1940s 1 – Mar 1951, US 1 for 9 weeks Apr 1951, DDD 10 of 1951, US BB 12 of 1951, POP 12 of 1951, RYM 19 of 1951, RIAA 317, Acclaimed 514
4	Nat King Cole	Too Young	1951	US	US 1940s 1 – Apr 1951, US 1 for 5 weeks Jun 1951, POP 1 of 1951, DDD 5 of 1951, RYM 10 of 1951
5	Mario Lanza	Be My Love	1951	US	US 1940s 1 – Dec 1950, US 1 for 1 weeks Mar 1951, US BB 9 of 1951, POP 9 of 1951, Europe 79 of the 1950s, RYM 137 of 1951

== Top hits on record ==
- "Aba Daba Honeymoon" – Debbie Reynolds & Carleton Carpenter
- "Because" – Mario Lanza
- "Because of You" – Tony Bennett
- "Belle, Belle, My Liberty Belle" – Guy Mitchell
- "Blue Tango" – Leroy Anderson & his Orchestra
- "Charmaine" – Mantovani & his Orchestra
- "Cold, Cold Heart" – Tony Bennett
- "Come On-A My House" – Rosemary Clooney
- "Cry" – Johnnie Ray & The Four Lads
- "Detour" – Patti Page
- "Down the Trail of Achin' Hearts" – Patti Page
- "Down Yonder" recorded by:
  - Del Wood
  - Champ Butler
- "Flamenco" – Frankie Laine
- "Gambella (The Gamblin' Lady)" – Frankie Laine & Jo Stafford
- "The Gang That Sang Heart Of My Heart" – Frankie Laine
- "Get Happy" – Frankie Laine
- "Get Out Those Old Records" – Guy Lombardo (The Lombardo Trio vocals)
- "The Girl In The Wood" – Frankie Laine
- "Give Me Time" – Johnnie Ray
- "Gone Fishin'" – Bing Crosby & Louis Armstrong
- "Got Him Off My Hands" – Georgia Gibbs
- "Hello, Young Lovers" recorded by:
  - Perry Como
  - Guy Lombardo (Kenny Martin vocals)
- "Hey, Good Lookin'" – Frankie Laine & Jo Stafford
- "The Hot Canary" – Florian Zabach
- "How High the Moon" – Les Paul and Mary Ford
- "I Taut I Taw a Puddy-Tat" – Mel Blanc
- "If" – Perry Como
- "I'll Never Be Free" – Lucky Millinder and His Orchestra
- "It Is No Secret" – Bill Kenny & The Song Spinners
- "It's All in the Game" – Tommy Edwards
- "It's Beginning To Look A Lot Like Christmas" – Perry Como & The Fontane Sisters
- "Jealousy (Jalousie)" – Frankie Laine
- "Jezebel" – Frankie Laine
- "The Little White Cloud That Cried" – Johnnie Ray & The Four Lads
- "The Loveliest Night Of The Year" – Mario Lanza
- "Lullaby of Broadway" – Doris Day
- "Mister and Mississippi" – Patti Page
- "Mockin' Bird Hill" – Patti Page
- "My Heart Cries For You" recorded by:
  - Vic Damone
  - Guy Mitchell
  - Dinah Shore
- "My Truly, Truly Fair" – Guy Mitchell
- "On Top of Old Smoky" – The Weavers with Terry Gilkyson
- "Once Upon A Nickel" – Georgia Gibbs
- "One For My Baby" – Frankie Laine
- "Out in the Cold Again" – Richard Hayes
- "Paths Of Paradise" – Johnnie Ray
- "Pretty-Eyed Baby" – Jo Stafford & Frankie Laine
- "Red Sails In The Sunset" – Nat King Cole
- "Rose, Rose, I Love You" – Frankie Laine
- "Shanghai" – Doris Day
- "Sin" – Eddy Howard & his Orchestra
- "Sound Off (The Duckworth Chant)" – Vaughn Monroe
- "Sparrow in the Treetop" – Guy Mitchell
- "A Sunday Kind of Love" – Jo Stafford
- "Sweet Violets" – Dinah Shore
- "The Syncopated Clock" – Leroy Anderson & his Orchestra
- "Tell Me" – Doris Day
- "Tell Me Why" – The Four Aces featuring Al Alberts
- "Tell The Lady I Said Goodbye" – Johnnie Ray
- "Tom's Tune" – Georgia Gibbs
- "Too Young" – Nat King Cole
- "Undecided" – Ames Brothers
- "Vanity" – Don Cherry
- "When It's Sleepy Time Down South" – Frankie Laine
- "While You Danced, Danced, Danced" – Georgia Gibbs
- "The World Is Waiting for the Sunrise" – Les Paul and Mary Ford
- "Would I Love You (Love You, Love You)" – Patti Page

== Top R&B hits on record ==
- "Rocket 88" – Jackie Brenston and his Delta Cats
- "Sixty Minute Man" – Dominoes
- "The Glory Of Love" – Five Keys
- "The Thrill Is Gone" – Roy Hawkins

== Published popular music ==
- "Alice In Wonderland" – w. Bob Hilliard m. Sammy Fain
- "All In The Golden Afternoon" – w. Bob Hilliard m. Sammy Fain
- "Allentown Jail" – w.m. Irving Gordon
- "And So To Sleep Again" w.m. Joe Marsala & Sunny Skylar
- "Anywhere I Wander" – w.m. Frank Loesser
- "A-Round the Corner" – trad arr. Josef Marais
- "Asia Minor" – w.m. Roger King Mozian
- "A-Sleepin' At The Foot Of The Bed" – Happy Wilson, Luther Patrick
- "Be My Life's Companion" – w.m. Bob Hilliard & Milton De Lugg
- "Beautiful Brown Eyes" – trad arr. Arthur Smith & Alton Delmore
- "Because of You" – w.m. Arthur Hammerstein & Dudley Wilkinson
- "Belle, Belle, My Liberty Belle" – w.m. Bob Merrill
- "Bermuda" – w.m. Cynthia Strother & Eugene R. Strother
- "The Blacksmith Blues" – w.m. Jack Holmes
- "Blue Velvet" – w.m. Bernie Wayne & Lee Morris
- "Christopher Columbus" – w.m. Terry Gilkyson
- "Come On-A My House" – w.m. Ross Bagdasarian & William Saroyan
- "Cry" – w.m. Churchill Kohlman
- "Dance Me Loose" – w. Mel Howard m. Lee Erwin
- "Domino" – w. (Eng) Don Raye (Fr) Jacques Plante m. Louis Ferrari
- "Getting To Know You" – w. Oscar Hammerstein II m. Richard Rodgers
- "Good Morning Mister Echo" – w.m. Bill Putman & Belinda Putman
- "Half As Much" – w.m. Curly Williams
- "He Had Refinement" – w. Dorothy Fields m. Arthur Schwartz
- "Hello, Young Lovers" – w. Oscar Hammerstein II m. Richard Rodgers
- "Hey, Good Lookin"' – w.m. Hank Williams
- "How Could You Believe Me When I Said I Love You When You Know I've Been A Liar All My Life?" – w. Alan Jay Lerner m. Burton Lane
- "I Can't Help It (If I'm Still In Love With You)" – w.m. Hank Williams
- "I Get Ideas" – w. Dorcas Cochran m. Lenny Sanders
- "I Have Dreamed" – w. Oscar Hammerstein II m. Richard Rodgers
- "I Love Lucy theme song" m. Eliot Daniel
- "I Love The Sunshine Of Your Smile" – w. Jack Hoffman m. Jimmy MacDonald
- "I Still See Elisa" – w. Alan Jay Lerner m. Frederick Loewe. Introduced by James Barton in the musical Paint Your Wagon. Performed in the film version by Clint Eastwood.
- "I Talk To The Trees" – w. Alan Jay Lerner m. Frederick Loewe. Introduced by Tony Bavaar and Olga San Juan in the musical Paint Your Wagon
- "I Whistle A Happy Tune" – w. Oscar Hammerstein II m. Richard Rodgers
- "I Wish I Wuz" – w.m. Sid Kuller & Lyn Murray. Introduced in the film Slaughter Trail
- "I Won't Cry Anymore" – w. Fred Wise m. Al Frisch
- "I'm A Fool To Want You" – w.m. Jack Wolf, Joel Herron & Frank Sinatra
- "I'm Late" – w. Bob Hilliard m. Sammy Fain
- "In The Cool, Cool, Cool Of The Evening" – w. Johnny Mercer m. Hoagy Carmichael. Introduced by Bing Crosby and Jane Wyman in the film Here Comes the Groom.
- "It's All In The Game" – w. Carl Sigman m. Charles Gates Dawes Based on "Melody" by Dawes 1912.
- "It's Beginning to Look a Lot Like Christmas" – w.m. Meredith Willson
- "Jezebel" – w.m. Wayne Shanklin
- "A Kiss To Build A Dream On" – w. Oscar Hammerstein II m. Harry Ruby
- "Kisses Sweeter Than Wine" – w. Paul Campbell m. Joel Newman
- "The Little White Cloud That Cried" – w.m. Johnnie Ray
- "The March Of The Siamese Children" – m. Richard Rodgers
- "Mister and Mississippi" – w.m. Irving Gordon
- "Misto Cristofo Columbo" – w.m. Jay Livingston & Ray Evans
- "Mockin' Bird Hill" – w.m. Vaughn Horton
- "The Morningside Of The Mountain" – w.m. Dick Manning & Larry Stock
- "My Truly, Truly Fair" – w.m. Bob Merrill
- "No Two People" – w.m. Frank Loesser
- "Sail Away" – w.m. Noël Coward
- "Sayang di Sayang" – w. Siti Zainab
- "Shall We Dance?" – w. Oscar Hammerstein II m. Richard Rodgers
- "Somewhere Along The Way" – w. Sammy Gallop m. Kurt Adams
- "Shanghai" – w.m. Bob Hilliard & Milton De Lugg
- "Shrimp Boats" – w.m. Paul Mason Howard & Paul Weston
- "(It's No) Sin" – w. Chester R. Shull m. George Hoven
- "Slow Poke" – w.m. Pee Wee King, Redd Stewart & Chilton Price
- "So Far, So Good" – w. Betty Comden & Adolph Green m. Jule Styne from the revue Two On The Aisle
- "Something Wonderful" – w. Oscar Hammerstein II m. Richard Rodgers
- "Sound Off" – w.m. Willie Lee Duckworth, B. Lentz
- "Sparrow In The Tree Top" – w.m. Bob Merrill
- "Suzy Snowflake" – w.m. Sid Tepper & Roy C. Bennett
- "Sweet Violets" – arr. Cy Coben & Charles Grean
- "Tell Me Why" – w. Al Alberts m. Marty Gold
- "They Call The Wind Maria" – w. Alan Jay Lerner m. Frederick Loewe. Introduced in the musical Paint Your Wagon by Rufus Smith
- "The Thrill Is Gone" – w.m. Rick Darnell & Roy Hawkins
- "Thumbelina" – w.m. Frank Loesser
- "Too Young" – w. Sylvia Dee m. Sidney Lippman
- "Top Banana" – w.m. Johnny Mercer from the musical Top Banana (musical)
- "The Typewriter" – m. Leroy Anderson
- "Unforgettable" – w.m. Irving Gordon
- "Vanity" – w. Jack Manus & Bernard Bierman m. Guy Wood
- "Very Good Advice" – w. Bob Hilliard m. Sammy Fain
- "A Very Merry Un-Birthday To You" – w.m. Mack David, Al Hoffman & Jerry Livingston
- "Wand'rin' Star" – w. Alan Jay Lerner m. Frederick Loewe. Introduced by Rufus Smith, Robert Penn and Jared Reed in the musical Paint Your Wagon.
- "We Kiss In A Shadow" – w. Oscar Hammerstein II m. Richard Rodgers
- "When The World Was Young" – w. (Eng) Johnny Mercer (Fr) Angela Vannier m. M. Philippe-Gerard
- "Wonderful Copenhagen" – w.m. Frank Loesser
- "Would I Love You (Love You, Love You)" – w. Bob Russell m. Harold Spina

== Classical music ==
=== Premieres ===
Sortable table
Composer	Composition	Date	Location	Performers
Arnold, Malcolm	Symphony No. 1 in D minor	1951-07-06	Cheltenham (Festival), UK	Hallé Orchestra – Arnold
Bal y Gay, Jesús	Concerto Grosso	1951-03-30	Mexico City	Mexico National Symphony – Chávez
Berger, Arthur	Duo for violin and piano	1951-10-19	New York, Town Hall	Lack, [pianist]
Blomdahl, Karl-Birger	Symphony No. 3, Facetter	1951-06-25	Frankfurt, Germany (ISCM Festival)	Bavarian Radio Symphony – Lehmann
Boulez, Pierre	Polyphonie X	1951-10-06	Donaueschingen, Germany (Musiktage)	SWF Radio Symphony – Rosbaud
Britten, Benjamin	Six Metamorphoses after Ovid	1951-06-14	Aldeburgh, UK (Festival)	Boughton. [pianist unknown]
Cage, John	Imaginary Landscape No. 4	1951-05-10	New York City	
Cooke, Arnold	Violin Sonata No. 2	1951-05-17	London	Rapaport, Cross
Dority, Bryan	"How Sweet I Roamed", for soprano and piano	1951-12-11	New York City, Carnegie Hall	Turash, Garvey
Dutilleux, Henri	Symphony No. 1	1951-06-07	Paris	RTF National Orchestra – Désormière
Ellington, Duke	Harlem	1951-06-20	New York (Lewisohn Stadium)	NBC Symphony Orchestra – Ellington
Ferguson, Howard	Piano Concerto in D	1951-06-22	Belfast, UK	Ferguson / City of Belfast Orchestra – Mulgan
Foss, Lukas	Piano Concerto No. 2	1951-10-07	Venice, Italy (Biennale)	Foss / La Fenice Philharmonic – Sanzogno
Fricker, Peter Racine	Symphony No. 2	1951-07-26	Liverpool, UK	Liverpool Philharmonic – Rignold
Fulton, Norman	Sinfonia pastorale	1951-06-?	Bournemouth, UK	Bournemouth Municipal Orchestra – [conductor unknown]
Gardner, John	Symphony No. 1, Op. 2	1951-07-05	Cheltenham, UK (Festival)	Hallé Orchestra – Barbirolli
Garūta, Lūcija/Skulte, Bruno	God, Thy Earth Is Aflame cantata, completed by Skulte (Note: The cantata was written in 1944 by poet Andrejs Eglitis and composer Lucija Garuta. During the Nazi occupation of the Baltic state [Latvia] only small portions of the work could be performed. Eglitis later escaped to Sweden, but of Garuta nothing was ever heard. A new musical score was written by Bruno Skulte while he was in a German displaced persons camp.)	1951-03-10	Brooklyn (Brooklyn Academy of Music)	[performers unknown]
Gerhard, Roberto	Piano Concerto	1951-06-16	Aldeburgh, UK (Festival)	Newton-Wood / Aldeburgh Festival Orchestra – Del Mar
Giannini, Vittorio	A Canticle of Christmas, for baritone, chorus, and orchestra	1951-12-10	Charlotte, North Carolina	White / Charlotte Symphony – Pfohl
Glière, Reinhold	Horn Concerto	1951-05-10	Leningrad, Soviet Union	Polekh / Leningrad Radio Symphony – Glière
Hartmann, Karl Amadeus	Symphonie Concertante (Symphony No. 5)	1951-04-21	Stuttgart, Germany	Stuttgart Radio Symphony – Müller-Kray
Holst, Imogen	Six Songs for women's voices and harp	1951-06-[8–17]	Aldeburgh, UK (Festival)	[performers unknown] – Holst
Hovhaness, Alan	Saint Vartan Symphony (Symphony No. 9, Op. 180)	1951-03-?	New York Carnegie Hall	[orchestra] – Hovhaness.
Ibert, Jacques	Symphonie Concertante for Oboe and Strings	1951-02-23	Basel, Switzerland	Shann / Basel Chamber Orchestra – Sacher
Ifukube, Akira	Drumming of Japan	1951-11-17	Tokyo	Tokyo Symphony – Ueda
Ives, Charles	Symphony No. 2 (1901)	1951-02-22	New York Carnegie Hall	New York Philharmonic – Bernstein
Jacobson, Maurice	Symphonic Suite for strings	1951-07-04	Cheltenham, UK (Festival)	Hallé Orchestra – Barbirolli
Jolivet, André	Piano Concerto	1951-06-19	Strasbourg, France (Festival)	Descaves / Strasbourg Radio Orchestra – Jolivet
Jacob, Gordon	Flute Concerto	1951-08-05	London	Morris / New London Orchestra – Sherman
Jirak, Karel	Symphony No. 5	1951-08-26	Edinburgh, UK (Festival)	Scottish National Orchestra – Susskind
Kay, Ulysses	Short Suite for concert band	1951-05-08	Waco, US (Baylor University)	Baylor University Golden Wave Band – Moore
Kay, Ulysses	Sinfonia in E (a.k.a. Symphony in E)	1951-05-02	Rochester, New York	Eastman-Rochester Orchestra – Hanson
Koechlin, Charles	Prélude sur le nom de Fauré for strings	1951-03-02	London (French Institute)	["a string orchestra"]
Landré, Guillaume	Symphony No. 3	1951-06-17	Amsterdam	Concertgebouw Orchestra – Kubelik
Lutosławski, Witold	Silesian Triptych	1951-12-02	Warsaw	Polish National Radio Symphony – Fitelberg
Martinů, Bohuslav	Concerto for Two Violins and Orchestra No. 2 (1950)	1951-01-14	Dallas, US	G. Beal, W. Beal / [unknown orchestra and conductor]
Murrill, Herbert	Concerto for cello and orchestra	1951-03-03	London (Royal Albert Hall)	Canning / BBC Symphony Orchestra – Cameron
Oldham, Arthur	The Commandment of Love song cycle	1951-06-[8–17]	Aldeburgh, UK (Festival)	Pears, Britten
Pettersson, Allan	Concerto for Violin and String Quartet	1951-03-10	Stockholm	Frydén / Ridderstad, Nihlman, Jonsson, Ericson
Piston, Walter	Symphony No. 4	1951-03-30	Minneapolis	Minneapolis Symphony Orchestra, Doráti
Prokofiev, Sergei	Piano Sonata No. 9 (1947)	1951-04-21	Moscow	Richter
Rawsthorne, Alan	Piano Concerto No. 2	1951-06-17	London (Festival of Britain)	Curzon / London Symphony – Sargent
Reizenstein, Franz	Serenade for Winds	1951-07-[9–14]	Cheltenham, UK (Festival)	The London Wind Players
Rodrigo, Joaquín	Sonatas de Castilla	1951-11-08	Madrid	Rodrigo
Rubbra, Edmund	Festival Te Deum	1951-06-30	London Royal Festival Hall	[unknown performers]
Rubbra, Edmund	String Quartet [No. 1?]	1951-07-[9–14]	Cheltenham, UK (Festival	Griller String Quartet
Sainton, Philip	Serenade Fantastique for oboe and strings	1951-07-08	Cheltenham, UK (Festival)	Goosens / Boyd Neel Orchestra – Neel
Schoenberg, Arnold	"The Dance around the Golden Calf" from Moses und Aron	1951-07-02	Darmstadt, Germany (Ferienkurse)	Orchester und Chor des Landestheaters Darmstadt – Scherchen
Shebalin, Vissarion	Sinfonietta	1951-11-12	Moscow	USSR Radio Symphony – Gauk
Stevens, Bernard	Sinfonietta	1951-07-06	Cheltenham, UK (Festival)	[unknown oboist] / Boyd Neel Orchestra – Barbirolli
Stockhausen, Karlheinz	Sonatine for violin and piano	1951-08-24 (Note: Broadcast date of radio recording, NWDR Cologne. First public performance did not occur until 22 October 1971, by Saschko Gawriloff and Aloys Kontarsky at a concert of the SMIP in Paris.)	Cologne, Germany	Marschner, Stockhausen
Talma, Louise	The Leaden Echo and the Golden Echo, choral dialogue	1951-12-14	New York, Juilliard Concert Hall	Juilliard Chorus – Hufstader
Villa-Lobos, Heitor	Fantasia for saxophone, three horns, and strings	1951-11-17	Rio de Janeiro, Auditório do Palácio de Cultura,	Waldemar Szpilman, Orquestra de Câmara do Ministério da Educação e Cultura – Villa-Lobos
van Wyk, Arnold	Symphony No. 1 in A minor	1951-07-03 (Note: Although previously performed in a radio broadcast in 1943, this was the first public performance.)	Cheltenham, UK (Festival)	Hallé Orchestra – Barbirolli
Wigglesworth, Frank	Summer Scenes for flute, oboe, and strings	1951-11-05	New York, Town Hall	Little Orchestra – Scherman

=== Compositions ===
- Jean Absil
  - Contes for trumpet and piano, Op. 76
  - Les météores, ballet for orchestra Op. 77
- Murray Adaskin – Ballet Symphony for orchestra
- Yasushi Akutagawa
  - Ballata for violin and piano
  - Kappa ballet for orchestra
  - Shitsuraku-en (Paradise Lost) ballet for orchestra
- Hugo Alfvén – Sängen till Folkare for baritone and piano or male choir and piano or male choir unaccompanied
- Hendrik Andriessen
  - Aubade for brass quartet
  - Choral No. 4 for organ (revised version)
  - Liederen (3), for choir
  - Sonata for unaccompanied cello
  - Suite for brass quartet
  - Wind Quintet
- Jurriaan Andriessen – Flute Concerto
- István Anhalt
  - Arc en ciel ballet for two pianos
  - Funeral Music for ten instruments
  - Piano Sonata
  - Psalm 19: A Benediction for baritone and piano
  - Songs of Love (3) for SSA choir
- George Antheil
  - Accordion Dance for orchestra
  - Fragments from Shelley (8) for choir and piano
  - Nocturne in Skyrockets for orchestra
  - Sonata for flute and piano
  - Sonata for trumpet and piano
- Denis ApIvor
  - The Goodman of Paris ballet for orchestra, Op. 18
  - A Mirror for Witches ballet for orchestra, Op.19
  - Suite Concertante for piano and small orchestra, Op.18a
- Boris Arapov – Russian Suite for orchestra
- Violet Archer – Fantasy in the Form of a Passacaglia for brass
- José Ardévol – Symphonic Variations for cello and orchestra
- Malcolm Arnold
  - Oboe Sonatina, Op. 28
  - Clarinet Sonatina, Op. 29
  - Machines, symphonic study, Op. 30
  - A Sussex Overture, Op. 31
  - Concerto for Piano Four-Hands and String Orchestra, Op. 32
  - English Dances, set 2, Op. 33
- Alexander Arutiunian – Concertino for piano and orchestra
- Georges Auric – Chemin de lumière ballet (also orchestral suite)
- Milton Babbitt
  - Du for soprano and piano
  - The Widow's Lament in Springtime, for soprano and piano
- Jesús Bal y Gay – Concerto Grosso
- Luciano Berio
  - Deus meus for voice and three instruments
  - Due liriche di Garcia Lorca for bass and orchestra
  - Due pezzi for violin and piano
  - Opus no. Zoo for reciter and wind quintet
  - Sonatina for wind quartet [withdrawn]
- Pierre Boulez – Polyphonie X
- Martin Boykan – Duo for violin and piano
- Benjamin Britten – Six Metamorphoses after Ovid for oboe and piano
- Earle Brown – Three Pieces for piano
- John Cage
  - Imaginary Landscape No. 4
  - Music of Changes
- Elliott Carter – String Quartet No. 1
- Carlos Chávez – "Happy Birthday", for a cappella chorus
- Henry Cowell
  - Clown dance music for piano
  - Duet for Sidney with Love from Henry for violin and cello
  - Her Smile Is as Sweet as a Rose for unaccompanied voice
  - Scherzo for soprano and alto recorders
  - Signature of Light for voice and piano
  - Tenth Anniversary for piano
- George Crumb
  - Pieces (3) for piano
  - Prelude and Toccata for piano
- Dimitrie Cuclin – Sinfonia No. 13
- Luigi Dallapiccola – Tartiniana
- David Diamond
  - The Midnight Meditation song cycle for voice and piano
  - Mizmor L'David, sacred service for tenor, choir, and organ
  - Piano Trio
  - String Quartet No. 4
- Henri Dutilleux – Symphony No. 1
- George Enescu – String Quartet No. 2, Op. 22, No. 2
- Morton Feldman
  - Extensions I, for violin and piano
  - Intersection, for tape
  - Intersection I for orchestra
  - Marginal Intersection for orchestra
  - Projection II, for 5 instruments
  - Projection III, for two pianos
  - Projection IV, for violin and piano
  - Projection V, for 9 instruments
  - Songs (4), for soprano, cello, and piano
  - Structures for string quartet
- Howard Ferguson – Piano Concerto in D
- Gerald Finzi
  - "God Is Gone Up", from 3 Anthems Op. 27
  - All This Night, Op. 33
  - Muses and Graces, Op. 34
  - Let Us Now Praise Famous Men, Op. 35
- Lukas Foss – Piano Concerto No. 2
- Roberto Gerhard
  - Sardana No. 3 for winds and percussion
  - Piano Concerto
- Reinhold Glière – Horn Concerto
- Karel Goeyvaerts
  - Sonata for Two Pianos
  - Nummer 2 for thirteen instruments
- Bengt Hambraeus
  - Cantata pro defunctis for baritone and organ
  - Concerto for Organ and Harpsichord (revised version)
  - Liturgia pro organo
- Howard Hanson – Fantasy-Variations on a Theme of Youth for piano and strings
- Roy Harris
  - Cumberland Concerto for orchestra
  - Fantasy for piano and "pops" orchestra
  - Red Cross Hymn for choir and band
- Paul Hindemith – Die Harmonie der Welt Symphony
- Vagn Holmboe – Sinfonia boreale (Symphony No. 8)
- Alan Hovhaness
  - Concerto No. 1 ("Arevakal") for orchestra, Op. 88
  - Concerto No. 2 for violin and strings, Op. 89, No. 1
  - Fantasy on an Ossetin Tune for piano, Op. 85
  - Four Motets, for SATB choir, Op. 87
  - From the End of the Earth for SATB choir and organ (or piano), Op. 187
  - Gamelan and Jhala for carillon, Op. 106
  - Hanna for 2 clarinets and 2 pianos, Op. 101
  - Hymn to a Celestial Musician for piano, Op. 111, No. 2
  - Jhala for piano, Op. 103
  - Make Haste, motet for SATB choir, Op. 86
  - Khaldis concerto for 4 trumpets, piano, and percussion, Op. 91
  - Khirgiz Suite for violin and piano, Op. 73, No. 1
  - Lullaby (a.k.a. Slumber Song for piano, Op. 52, No. 2
  - Sing Aloud for SATB choir, Op. 68
  - Suite for violin, piano and percussion, Op. 99
  - Talin concerto for viola and strings, Op. 93, No. 1
  - Toccata and Fugue on a Kabardin Tune for piano, Op. 6, No. 2
  - Upon Enchanted Ground for flute, cello, harp, and tam-tam, Op. 90, No. 1
- Akira Ifukube – Drumming of Japan
- André Jolivet – Piano Concerto
- Wojciech Kilar –
  - Sonatina for flute and piano
  - Three preludes for piano
  - Variations on a Theme by Paganini for piano
- Gail Kubik – Symphony Concertante [1952 Pulitzer]
- György Ligeti – Concert românesc
- Douglas Lilburn – Symphony No. 2
- Witold Lutosławski
  - Jesień
  - Polskich pieśni ludowych na tematy żołnierskie (10) for male choir
  - Recitative and Arioso for violin and piano
  - Silesian Triptych
- Gian Francesco Malipiero – Sinfonia dello Zodiaco
- Frank Martin – Violin Concerto
- Bohuslav Martinů
  - Piano Trio No. 3
  - Serenade for Two Clarinets and String Trio
  - Stowe Pastorals
- Peter Mennin – String Quartet No. 2
- Darius Milhaud
  - Le candélabre à sept branches, Op. 315
  - Concertino d'automne for two pianos and eight instruments, Op. 309
  - Concertino d'été for viola and chamber orchestra, Op. 311
  - Les miracles de la foi, cantata for tenor, chorus and orchestra, Op. 314
- José Pablo Moncayo – Muros verdes for piano
- Xavier Montsalvatge
  - Cuarteto indiano
  - Poema Concertante for violin and orchestra
- Luigi Nono
  - Composizione no. 1 for orchestra
  - Polifonica – monodia – ritmica, for flute, clarinet, bass clarinet, saxophone, horn, piano, and percussion
- Vincent Persichetti – Symphony No. 4
- Allan Pettersson – Seven Sonatas for Two Violins
- Walter Piston – String Quartet No. 4
- Henri Pousseur
  - Missa brevis for four mixed voices
  - Sept Versets des Psaumes de la Pénitence for four solo voices or mixed choir
- Sergei Prokofiev – Symphony-Concerto for cello and orchestra
- Peter Racine Fricker – Symphony No. 2
- Joaquín Rodrigo – Sonatas de Castilla
- Guy Ropartz – String Quartet No. 6
- Ned Rorem
  - Cycle of Holy Songs (Psalms 134, 142, 148, 150) for vice and piano
  - From an Unknown Past song cycle for voice and piano
  - Love in a Life for voice and piano
  - The Nightingale for voice and piano
  - Seven Choruses for a cappella choir
  - To a Young Girl for voice and piano
- Edmund Rubbra – String Quartet No. 2
- Hermann Schroeder – Ave Maria zart chorale-prelude for organ
- Mátyás Seiber – Concertino for clarinet and ensemble
- Roger Sessions – String Quartet No. 2
- Dmitri Shostakovich – Preludes and Fugues (24) for piano
- Reginald Smith Brindle – Concertino for guitar and chamber orchestra
- Karlheinz Stockhausen – Kreuzspiel
- Virgil Thomson
  - Chromatic Double Harmonies: Portrait of Sylvia Marlowe in Nine Etudes for piano
  - De profundis (Psalm 30), SATB choir (revised version)
  - For a Happy Occasion (Happy Birthday for Mrs. Zimbalist) for piano
- Eduard Tubin – Sonata for alto saxophone solo
- David Van Vactor – Violin Concerto
- Villa-Lobos, Heitor
  - Guitar Concerto
  - Quinteto (em forma de chôros), version for conventional wind quintet with horn instead of cor anglais
  - Rudá (Dio d'amore), symphonic poem and ballet
  - String Quartet No. 13
  - Symphony No. 9
- Frank Wigglesworth – Summer Scenes for flute, oboe, and strings

== Opera ==
- Benjamin Britten – Billy Budd, with libretto by E. M. Forster and Eric Crozier (1 December, Covent Garden)
- Paul Dessau – The Trial of Lucullus, with libretto by Bertolt Brecht (March 18, Berlin), despite rumours that the work would be forbidden by the East German authorities.
- Jean Françaix – L'apostrophe, libretto based on Balzac (1 July, Amsterdam, Netherlands Opera)
- Joseph Haydn – Orfeo et Euridice (9 June, Teatro della Pergola, Florence, at the fourteenth Maggio Musicale Fiorentino).
- Marcel Landowski – Le Rire de Nils Halerius
- Jan Meyerowitz – Eastward in Eden, libretto adapted by Dorothy Gardner from her own play (16 November, Detroit, Wayne State University Theatre).
- Gian-Carlo Menotti – Amahl and the Night Visitors 24 December, NBC television broadcast, live from Radio City Studio H-8 (New York).
- Igor Stravinsky – The Rake's Progress, with libretto by W. H. Auden and Chester Kallman, Venice, Teatro La Fenice, 11 September.
- Peter Tranchell – The Mayor of Casterbridge, libretto adapted from the novel by Thomas Hardy (30 July, Cambridge, Arts Theatre).
- Ralph Vaughan Williams – The Pilgrim's Progress
- Egon Wellesz – Incognita, from a novel by William Congreve (December, Oxford).

== Film ==
- Robert Farnon - Captain Horatio Hornblower
- Bernard Herrmann - The Day the Earth Stood Still
- Bernard Herrmann - On Dangerous Ground
- Alex North - A Streetcar Named Desire
- Miklós Rózsa - Quo Vadis
- Leith Stevens - When Worlds Collide
- Dimitri Tiomkin - The Thing from Another World
- Franz Waxman - A Place in the Sun

== Musical theater ==
- And So To Bed (Vivian Ellis) London production opened at the New Theatre on October 17 and ran for 323 performances
- Flahooley (E. Y. Harburg and Sammy Fain) Broadway production opened at the Broadhurst Theatre on May 14 and ran for 40 performances.
- Gay's The Word London production opened at the Saville Theatre on February 16 and ran for 504 performances
- The King and I (Richard Rodgers and Oscar Hammerstein II) – Broadway production opened at the St. James Theatre on March 29 and ran for 1,246 performances
- Kiss Me, Kate (Cole Porter) – London production opened at the Coliseum on March 8 and ran for 501 performances
- Make a Wish (Hugh Martin)Broadway production opened at the Winter Garden Theatre on April 18 and ran for 102 performances. Starred Nanette Fabray.
- Oklahoma! first German production (Berlin)
- Paint Your Wagon (Alan Jay Lerner and Frederick Loewe) – Broadway production opened at the Shubert Theatre on November 12 and ran for 289 performances
- Penny Plain – London production
- See You Later (Sandy Wilson) London production opened at the Watergate Theatre on October 3.
- Seventeen Broadway production opened at the Broadhurst Theatre on June 21 and ran for 182 performances
- South Pacific (Rodgers & Hammerstein) – London production
- Top Banana Broadway production opened at the Winter Garden Theatre on November 1 and ran for 350 performances.
- A Tree Grows in Brooklyn Broadway production opened at the Alvin Theatre on April 19 and ran for 267 performances
- Two On The Aisle – Broadway production opened at the Mark Hellinger Theatre on July 19 and ran for 279 performances
- Zip Goes A Million (Book: Eric Maschwitz Words: Eric Maschwitz Music: George Posford – London production opened at the Palace Theatre on October 20 and ran for 544 performances. Starring George Formby, Sara Gregory & Warde Donovan. Directed by Charles Hickman

== Musical films ==
- Alice In Wonderland (original Disney animated film)
- An American In Paris starring Gene Kelly, Leslie Caron, Oscar Levant, Georges Guétary and Nina Foch
- Call Me Mister starring Betty Grable and Dan Dailey
- Excuse My Dust starring Red Skelton, Monica Lewis, Sally Forrest, Macdonald Carey and William Demarest. Dirested by Roy Rowland.
- The Great Caruso (starring Mario Lanza)
- Here Comes the Groom released September 20 starring Bing Crosby and Jane Wyman.
- The Lemon Drop Kid starring Bob Hope and Marilyn Maxwell.
- Lullaby Of Broadway starring Doris Day and Gene Nelson
- Mr. Imperium starring Lana Turner and Ezio Pinza
- On Moonlight Bay starring Doris Day and Gordon MacRae
- On the Riviera starring Danny Kaye, Gene Tierney and Corinne Calvet
- Purple Heart Diary starring Frances Langford, Judd Holdren, Ben Lessy and Tony Romano. Directed by Richard Quine.
- Rich, Young and Pretty starring Jane Powell, Danielle Darrieux, Wendell Corey, Vic Damone and Una Merkel
- Royal Wedding starring Fred Astaire and Jane Powell
- Show Boat (directed by George Sidney based on the stage musical)
- The Strip starring Mickey Rooney and featuring Louis Armstrong
- Two Tickets to Broadway released November 20 starring Janet Leigh, Tony Martin, Gloria DeHaven, Ann Miller and Bob Crosby.

== Births ==
- January 6 – Kim Wilson, blues singer (The Fabulous Thunderbirds)
- January 9 – Crystal Gayle, country singer
- January 19
  - Dewey Bunnell, rock musician (America)
  - Martha Davis, rock singer-songwriter (The Motels)
- January 20 – Ian Hill, heavy metal bassist (Judas Priest)
- January 23 - Ángela Carrasco, singer
- January 26
  - David Briggs, Australian guitarist, songwriter and producer
  - Roy Goodman, English violinist and conductor
  - Andy Hummel, American singer-songwriter and bass player (d. 2010)
  - Christopher North, American keyboard player
- January 27
  - Brian Downey, drummer (Thin Lizzy)
  - Seth Justman (The J. Geils Band)
- January 30 – Phil Collins, drummer, singer and actor (Genesis)
- January 31
  - K.C. (Harry Wayne Casey), singer (K.C. and the Sunshine Band)
  - Phil Manzanera, guitarist (Roxy Music)
- February 4 – Phil Ehart, American drummer (Kansas)
- February 7 – Andy Chapin, English keyboard player (The Association) (d. 1985)
- February 9 – Dennis Thomas (Kool and the Gang) (d. 2021)
- February 12 – Gil Moore (Triumph)
- February 14 – Sylvain Sylvain, glam rock/protopunk guitarist (New York Dolls) (d. 2021)
- February 15 – Melissa Manchester, singer
- February 22 – Ellen Greene, singer and actress
- February 27 – Steve Harley, glam rock singer-songwriter (Cockney Rebel) (d. 2024)
- March 4 – Chris Rea, singer-songwriter and guitarist (d. 2025)
- March 5 – Willis Alan Ramsey, American singer-songwriter and guitarist
- March 9 – Zakir Hussain, Indian-born tabla player, music producer, film actor and soundtrack composer (d. 2024)
- March 17 – Scott Gorham (Thin Lizzy)
- March 20 – Jimmie Vaughan (The Fabulous Thunderbirds)
- March 21
  - Russell Thompkins, Jr., vocalist (The Stylistics)
  - Conrad Lozano (Los Lobos)
  - Nigel Dick, British music video director, film director, writer and musician
- March 23 – Phil Keaggy, guitarist, singer
- April 3 – Mel Schacher (Question Mark & the Mysterians, Grand Funk Railroad)
- April 6 – Pascal Rogé, pianist
- April 7 – Janis Ian, singer-songwriter
- April 8 – Joan Sebastian, born José Figueroa, singer-songwriter (d. 2015)
- April 12 – Alex Briley (Village People)
- April 13
  - Peabo Bryson, singer (d. 2026)
  - Max Weinberg, drummer and bandleader (Late Night with Conan O'Brien)
- April 14 – Julian Lloyd Webber, cellist
- April 16 – Mordechai Ben David, singer
- April 20 – Luther Vandross, soul singer (d. 2005)
- April 22 – Paul Carrack, singer-songwriter and multi-instrumentalist
- April 27 – Ace Frehley, rock guitarist (Kiss) (d. 2025)
- May 2 – Jo Callis, English musician and songwriter (The Human League, The Rezillos)
- May 3 – Christopher Cross, singer-songwriter (Michael McDonald Band, Alan Parsons Project)
- May 4
  - Jackie Jackson, vocalist (The Jackson Five)
  - Mick Mars, heavy metal guitarist (Mötley Crüe)
- May 8
  - Philip Bailey, vocalist (Earth, Wind & Fire)
  - Chris Frantz, American musician and record producer (Talking Heads, Tom Tom Club)
- May 10
  - Ronald Banks, soul singer (The Dramatics)
  - John Magnar Bernes, Norwegian singer and harmonica player
- May 16 – Jonathan Richman, singer-songwriter
- May 19 – Joey Ramone, singer (Ramones) (d. 2001)
- June 3 – Deniece Williams, singer
- June 6 – Dwight Twilley, American singer-songwriter and producer (d. 2023)
- June 8 – Bonnie Tyler, singer (d. 2026)
- June 10 – Ed McTaggart, rock drummer (Daniel Amos, The Road Home)
- June 12
  - Bun E. Carlos, rock drummer (Cheap Trick)
  - Brad Delp, hard rock singer (Boston) (d. 2007)
- June 15 – Steve Walsh, progressive rock singer-songwriter (Kansas)
- June 19
  - Patty Larkin, American singer-songwriter, guitarist and producer
  - Karen Young, Canadian singer-songwriter
- June 26 – Tony Currenti, drummer (AC/DC)
- June 30 – Steve Waller, guitarist (d. 2000)
- July 1
  - Fred Schneider, rock singer-songwriter (The B-52s)
  - Victor Willis, American singer-songwriter (Village People) (d. 2026)
- July 7 – Blondie Chaplin, guitarist and singer
- July 11 – Bonnie Pointer, singer (The Pointer Sisters)
- July 12 – Sylvia Sass, operatic soprano
- July 15 – Gregory Isaacs, reggae musician (d. 2010)
- July 19 – Debra Byrd vocalist (d. 2024)
- July 22 – Richard Bennett, American guitarist and producer (The Notorious Cherry Bombs)
- August 2 – Andrew Gold, singer-songwriter (d. 2011)
- August 3 – Johnny Graham (Earth, Wind & Fire)
- August 4 – Lois V Vierk, composer
- August 13 – Dan Fogelberg, singer-songwriter, composer and multi-instrumentalist (d. 2007)
- August 15 – Bobby Caldwell, singer-songwriter and multi-instrumentalist (d. 2023)
- August 19 – John Deacon, bass guitarist (Queen)
- August 23
  - Jimi Jamison (Survivor)
  - Mark Hudson (The Hudson Brothers)
- August 25 – Rob Halford, heavy metal singer (Judas Priest)
- August 28
  - Wayne Osmond, pop vocalist, multi-instrumentalist and songwriter (The Osmonds) (d. 2025)
  - Dennis Davis, American drummer (d. 2016)
- September 2 – Mik Kaminski (Electric Light Orchestra)
- September 4 – Martin Chambers, drummer (The Pretenders)
- September 6 – Šaban Šaulić, Serbian folk singer (d. 2019)
- September 7 – Chrissie Hynde, singer (The Pretenders)
- September 12 – Olga Breeskin, violinist, dancer and actress
- September 19 – Daniel Lanois, record producer, guitarist and singer-songwriter
- September 22 – David Coverdale, vocalist (Deep Purple, Whitesnake)
- September 25 – Peter Dvorský, operatic tenor
- September 26 – Tony Fox Sales, American musician (Tin Machine)
- October 2 – Sting, singer
- October 5 – Bob Geldof, singer (The Boomtown Rats), social campaigner & organizer of LiveAid
- October 6 – Kevin Cronin (REO Speedwagon)
- October 7 – John Mellencamp, singer-songwriter, artist and actor
- October 13 – John Ford Coley, singer, pianist, guitarist, actor and author
- October 19 – Lilia Vera, Venezuelan folk singer
- October 20 – Al Greenwood, rock keyboardist (Foreigner)
- October 23 – Charly García, singer-songwriter and pianist
- October 26 – Maggie Roche (The Roches) (d. 2017)
- October 27 – K. K. Downing, heavy metal guitarist (Judas Priest)
- November 1 – Ronald Bell (Kool & the Gang) (d. 2020)
- November 13 – Bill Gibson, rock drummer (Huey Lewis and the News)
- November 14 – Alec John Such, American bass player (Bon Jovi)
- November 15 – Joe Puerta, American singer and bass player (Ambrosia)
- November 18 – Heinrich Schiff, Austrian cellist and conductor (d. 2016)
- November 27 – Kevin Kavanaugh (Southside Johnny and The Asbury Jukes)
- November 29 – Barry Goudreau, rock guitarist (Boston)
- December 4 – Gary Rossington, rock guitarist (Lynyrd Skynyrd, Rossington-Collins Band) (d. 2023)
- December 10
  - Larry Fast, synthesizer player/composer
  - Johnny Rodriguez, country singer
- December 16
  - Robben Ford, guitarist
  - Mark Heard, singer-songwriter (d. 1992)
- December 21 – Nick Gilder, singer-songwriter
- December 25 – Barbara Dever, operatic soprano
- December 26
  - Paul Quinn, heavy metal guitarist (Saxon)
  - John Scofield, jazz guitarist and composer
- December 29 – Yvonne Elliman, singer
- December 31
  - Tom Hamilton (Aerosmith)
  - George Thorogood, blues musician
- date unknown – Lorenzo Ferrero, composer

== Deaths ==
- January 20 – Alexander Chuhaldin, violinist, conductor, composer, and music educator, 58
- February 3 – Fréhel, French singer, actress, 59
- February 9 – Eddy Duchin, pianist and bandleader, 41 (leukaemia)
- February 20 – Howard Brockway, composer, 80
- February 28 – Giannina Russ, operatic soprano, 77
- March 5 – Leo Singer, vaudeville impresario, 73
- March 6 – Ivor Novello, operetta composer, entertainer, 58 (coronary thrombosis)
- March 12 – Harold Bauer, pianist and violinist, 77
- March 25 – Sid Catlett, jazz drummer, 41 (heart attack)
- April 21 – Olive Fremstad, operatic soprano, 80
- May 20 – Jan Ingenhoven, Dutch composer and conductor, 75
- May 29
  - Fanny Brice, US actress, comedian and singer
  - Josef Bohuslav Foerster, Czech classical composer (born 1859)
  - Robert Kahn, composer, 85
- June 4 – Serge Koussevitzky, double-bassist, conductor and composer, 76
- June 26 – Frank Ferera, Hawaiian musician (born 1885)
- July 9
  - Giannina Arangi-Lombardi, operatic soprano, 60
  - Egbert Van Alstyne, US songwriter
  - Jorgen Bentzon, Danish composer
- July 13 – Arnold Schoenberg, Austrian composer, 76
- August 15 – Artur Schnabel, pianist, 69
- August 21
  - Mary Carson, American soprano, 75
  - Constant Lambert, composer, 45 (pneumonia and undiagnosed diabetes)
- September 2 – Pietro Frosini, accordionist, 67
- September 3 – Leo Sheffield, d'Oyly Carte star, 77
- September 14 – Fritz Busch, conductor, 61
- September 17 – Jimmy Yancey, US jazz pianist
- November 4 – Oscar Natzka, opera singer, 39
- November 9 – Sigmund Romberg, composer
- November 11 – César Vezzani, operatic tenor, 63
- November 13 – Nikolai Medtner, pianist and composer, 71
- December 1 – Edward Joseph Collins, pianist, conductor and composer
- December 26 – Vic Berton, jazz drummer, 55
- date unknown
  - Giuseppina Huguet, operatic soprano (born 1871)
  - Margot Ruddock, actress and singer (born 1907)
  - Vince Courtney songwriter and performer
