= Imaginary Landscape No. 3 =

- by John Cage
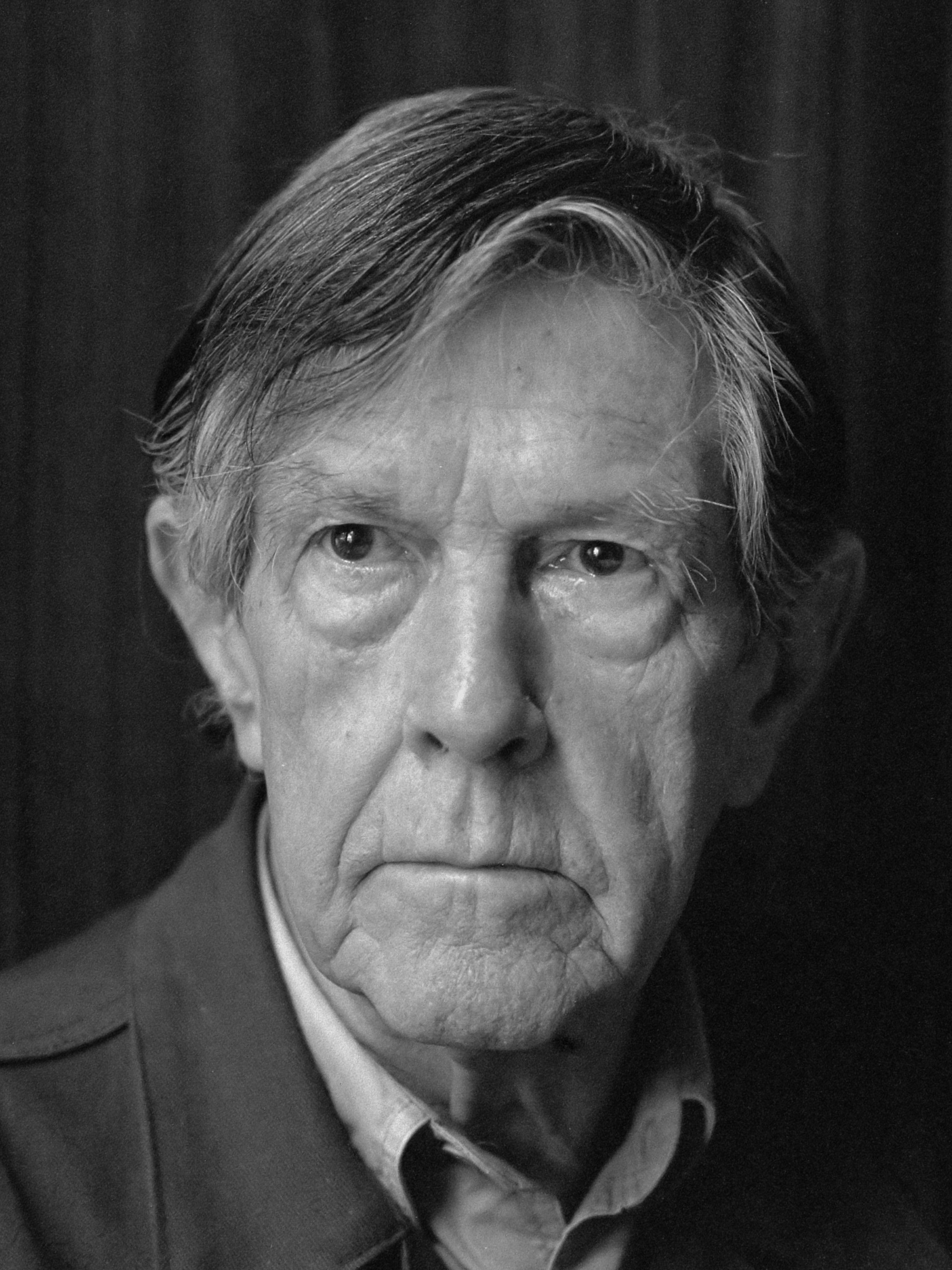
- John Cage (1988)
- Composed: 1942
- Performed: March 1, 1942 - Chicago
- Published: Edition Peters
- Movements: 1
- Scoring: Six percussionists

Imaginary Landscape No. 3 is a composition for six percussionists by American composer John Cage and the third in the series of Imaginary Landscapes. It is the last Imaginary Landscape to feature percussion instruments and, therefore, the last one to be considered a chamber piece. It was composed in 1942.

== Composition ==
After using the idea of tone records in turntables to create music in Imaginary Landscape No. 1, John Cage started working in radio station across the United States to practice with the possibilities of both broadcasting and the use of electronic devices as musical instruments. Imaginary Landscape No. 3 was created in Chicago, where he was working in early 1942. This piece was made after he learned about the amplified coil of wire, a technique that he also used in Imaginary Landscape No. 2 and which he came in contact with after knowing a sound effects producer in Chicago.

The premiere took place on March 1, 1942, just a few months prior to the premiere of his Imaginary Landscape No. 2. On this occasion, Cage was given a hearing by the Arts Club in Chicago. After a buffet supper, Cage himself conducted in shirtsleeves a concert entitled Music for Percussion Orchestra. Ten performers, among which was his own wife at the time, Xenia Cage, then premiered works by William Russell and Lou Harrison, the dedicatee of Imaginary Landscape No. 2, as well as his own Imaginary Landscape No. 3. Due to its unusual scoring, which also called for a siren, he had to obtain official permission from the Chicago police.

This premiere became well known because he used a beer bottle, which he had to shatter into an iron bar getting the bits into a barrel. The Chicago Daily Times famously reported that Xenia told Cage to "be careful" and not to "cut" himself. After Cage burst the bottle, splinters of glass cut his hands, so he smiled to the audience and announced: "That is the finale". Especially because of the finale, the concert brought Cage national attention: the New York World-Telegram ran the headline "They Break Beer Bottles Now to Make Music in Chicago", and numerous magazines published pictures of him laughing while banging and playing the piano with his elbows.

After this, since the Cages disliked Chicago very much, they moved to another apartment and remodeled it with new furniture. Getting these changes allowed John to composed his Fourth Construction, a piece which eventually became Imaginary Landscape No. 2. Imaginary Landscape No. 3 was dedicated to Lavinia Schwartz and was later published by Edition Peters.

== Structure ==
This piece consist of only one movement and has a total duration of three minutes. It is scored for six percussionists playing tin cans, a muted gong, audio frequency oscillators, three variable speed turntables using tone recordings, buzzers, a microphone-amplified marimbula and an amplified coil of wire attached to a phonographic tone arm. This latter technique was first used in this composition, even though it was also used in Imaginary Landscape No. 2. To a certain extent, this composition is a combination of the first two in the series.

== Recordings ==
The following is an incomplete list of recordings of Imaginary Landscape No. 3:

- The Maelström Percussion Ensemble recorded of the piece. The recording took place between May 28 and June 1, 1995 and was released by Hat Hut.
- The Italian Ensemble Prometeo recorded this piece in 2009. The recording was later released in 2012 by Stradivarius.
- The Percussion Group Cincinnati also performed this piece in 2011. It was recorded and released by Mode Records both on CD and DVD.
