= Imaginary Landscape No. 2 (March No. 1) =

- by John Cage
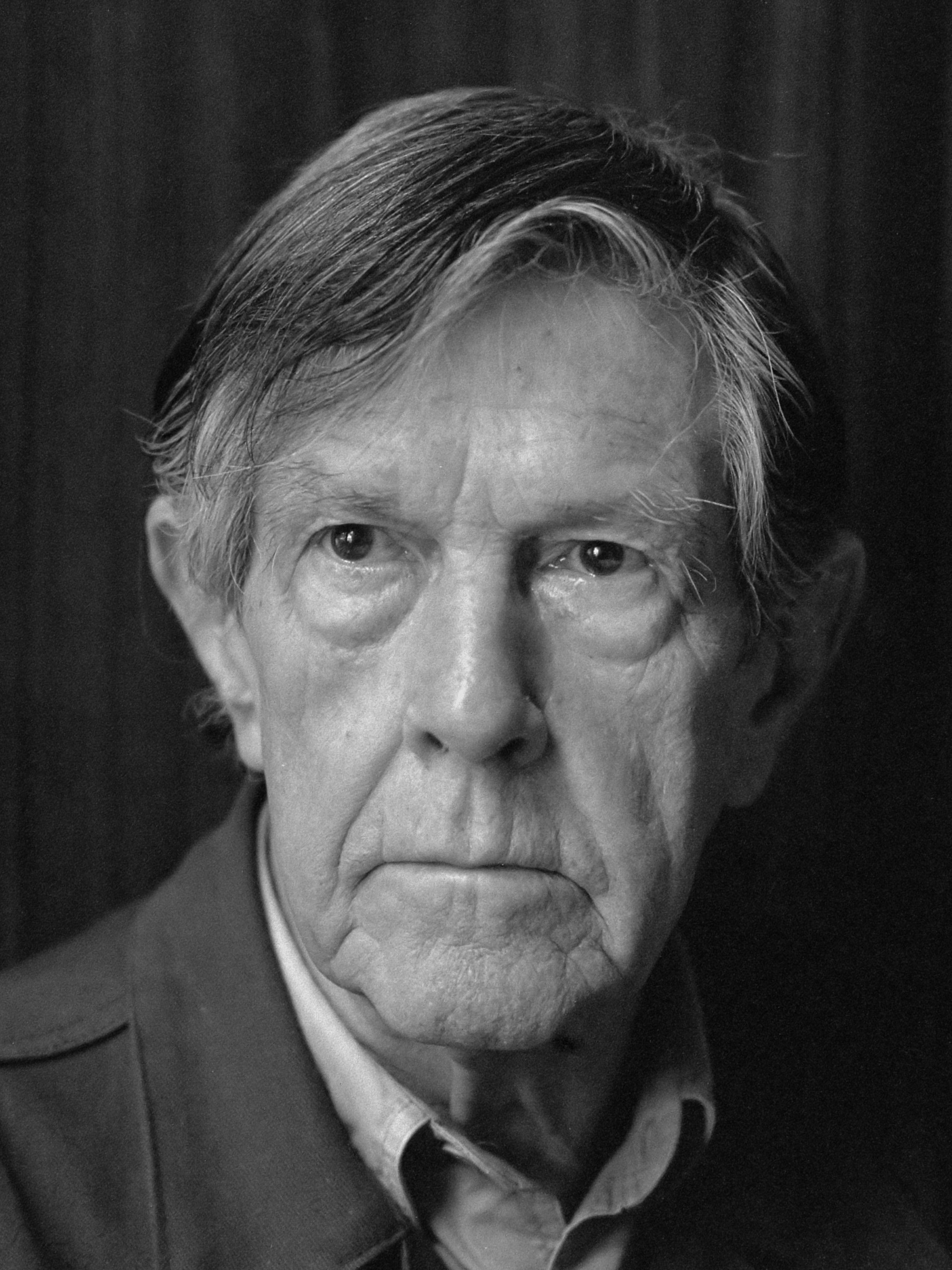
- John Cage (1988)
- Composed: 1942
- Performed: May 7, 1942 - San Francisco
- Published: Edition Peters
- Movements: 1
- Scoring: Five percussionists

Imaginary Landscape No. 2 (March No. 1) is a composition for five percussionists by American composer John Cage and the second in the series of Imaginary Landscapes. It was also the first march in the set, the second being Imaginary Landscape No. 4 (March No. 2). It was composed in 1942.

== Composition ==
The title Imaginary Landscape No. 2 was first used in 1940, after Cage composed Bacchanale and premiered it on April 28, 1940, for a solo recital at the Repertory Playhouse given by Bonnie Bird's student Syvilla Fort. The piece that was meant to be played at the recital was a piece for percussion ensemble. However, given the small space left on stage for performers, it seemed impractical and Cage decided to write Bacchanale, which is scored for a solo prepared piano. Two weeks after this recital, Bird presented a new series of recitals to take place between May 7 to 11, 1940, and they would feature Cage's Imaginary Landscape No. 2, a composition for four percussionists.

This piece was recorded in a radio studio by four players, two assistants, and a technician. As in Imaginary Landscape No. 1, this work would feature two turntables, a tom-tom, chinese cymbal and a prepared piano, and the turntables would shift speeds as specified in the score. The two assistants would just regulate the dynamics of the piece, raising or lowering the volume of the microphones where necessary. However, this piece was recorded and withdrawn shortly afterwards. It was not until 1942, when Cage moved to San Francisco and started working with Lou Harrison, that Cage wrote the piece entitled Fourth Construction. This piece was scored for five percussionists and featured no turntables nor pianos. It was composed in San Francisco in 1942 and premiered exactly two years later, on May 7, 1942, merely two months after premiering his Imaginary Landscape No. 3 in Chicago. After its premiere, Cage changed its title to March (Imaginary Landscape No. 2) and, subsequently, Imaginary Landscape No. 2 (March No. 1). It was dedicated to Lou Harrison and was eventually published by Edition Peters.

== Structure ==
This piece consists of only one movement and has a total duration of seven minutes. It is scored for five percussionists playing tin cans, a conch shell, a ratchet, a bass drum, a buzzers, a water gong, a metal wastebasket, a lion's roar and an amplified coil of wire attached to a phonographic tone arm. This latter technique was first used in Imaginary Landscape No. 2, composed just two months before. Cage learned to use it after talking to a sound effects producer. According to Cage himself, "when I got to Chicago, I had a commission to do a piece for CBS and I worked with a sound effects engineer at the radio station in Chicago, and he showed me the thunderous sound of the coil wire in contact with the microphone - which I loved". As was the case of Imaginary Landscape No. 4 (March No. 2), this is no conventional march and offers no recognizable traits as such to the listener.

== Recordings ==
The following is an incomplete list of recordings of Imaginary Landscape No. 2:

- The Maelström Percussion Ensemble recorded of the piece. The recording took place between May 28 and June 1, 1995 and was released by Hat Hut.
- The Italian Ensemble Prometeo recorded this piece in 2009. The recording was later released in 2012 by Stradivarius.
- The Percussion Group Cincinnati also performed this piece in 2011. It was recorded and released by Mode Records both on CD and DVD.
