= Imaginary Landscape No. 5 =

Composition by John Cage

- by John Cage
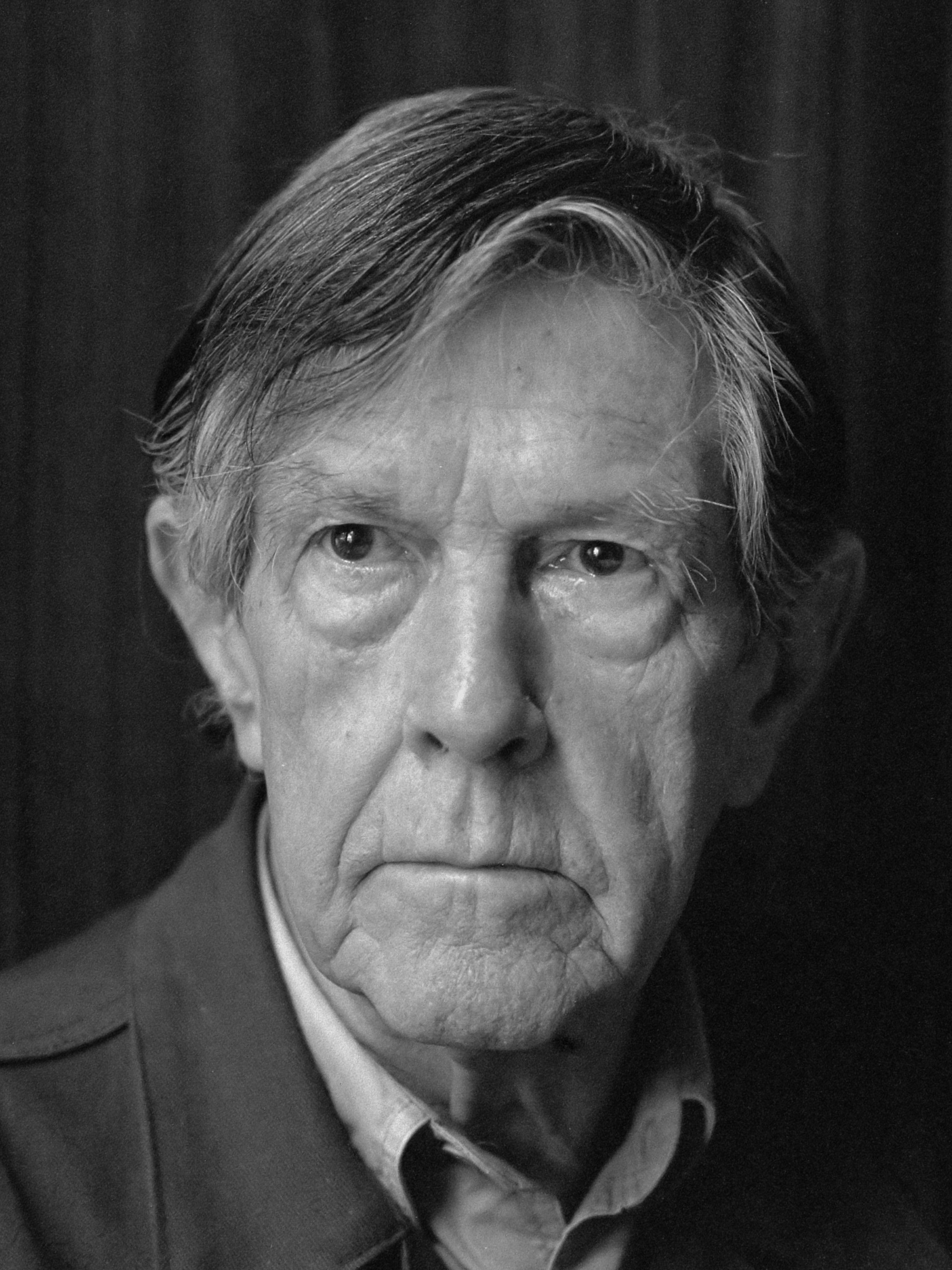
- John Cage (1988)
- Composed: 1952
- Performed: January 18, 1952 - New York
- Published: Edition Peters
- Movements: 1
- Scoring: 42 recordings

Imaginary Landscape No. 5 (sometimes also entitled Imaginary Landscapes No. 5) (Note: The title Imaginary Landscapes No. 5 is used on the cover of the original score, EP 6719. The first page of the score, however, changes the title to Imaginary Landscape No. 5, for any 42 phonograph records) is a composition by American composer John Cage and the fifth and final installment in the series of Imaginary Landscapes. It was composed in 1952.

Imaginary Landscape No. 5 by taking small fragments from 42 different phonograph records and mixing them together. He used chance to help decide which sounds to use and how to combine them, rather than composing in a more traditional manner.

== Composition ==
After working on his Imaginary Landscape No. 4 (March No. 2) and his Music of Changes, Cage's first two works to feature utter indeterminacy, Cage started working with Morton Feldman on graphical scores, which was fairly avant-garde at the time. Fascinated by the idea of detaching himself from the music he was making, he decided to write a piece that used the system in No. 4, but with recorded music rather than radio broadcasting. This piece was a part of Cage's two contributions to a project entitled Project for Music for Magnetic Tape, the other one being Williams Mix, composed in a similar fashion and also presented on graphic paper. However, the piece was to be realized as a tape recording, and not to be broadcast.

With the help of long-time collaborator David Tudor and the technical assistance from Bebe and Louis Barron, Cage realized the composition on January 18, 1952. Cage used mostly jazz recordings to make this piece, which called for 42 recordings, presented as disposed in the score. This work became the basis of a dance piece, entitled Portrait of a Lady, which premiered in New York in 1952 by Jean Erdman. The score was eventually published by Edition Peters.

== Structure ==
This piece consist of only one movement and the average duration varies widely from recording to recording. It is scored for 42 recordings disposed in eight tracks in a mixing studio, all of them being re-recorded into tape as disposed in the score. The score itself is a block-grid, wherein each square is meant to be three inches of recording (around 0.2 seconds). The score also indicates the changes in dynamics and includes crescendos and diminuendos. Whereas duration and amplitude are specified in the score, there is no mention from Cage as to what recordings or what type of music should be used for performing the piece. The compositional method was use of the I Ching, creating a chart work with a five to five structure, as in Imaginary Landscape No. 4 (March No. 2).

In The Ambient Century (2000), Mark Prendergast said of the work that "Cage, with the help of Earle Brown and Bebe Barron, collaged forty-two jazz records into a huge tape mix."

== Recordings ==
The following is an incomplete list of recordings of Imaginary Landscape No. 5:

- Peter Pfister realized the piece using jazz recordings by Anthony Braxton. The recording took place between May 28 and June 1, 1995 and was released by Hat Hut.
- Alvise Vidolin also recorded this piece in 2009. The recording was later released in 2012 by Stradivarius.
- Michael Barnhart also realized this piece in 2011 using pieces by Cage. It was recorded and released by Mode Records both on CD and DVD.
