= Alice in Wonderland (song) =

1951 Disney theme song

"Alice in Wonderland" is the theme song composed by Sammy Fain for the Walt Disney 1951 animated film Alice in Wonderland. It was performed by The Jud Conlon Chorus and The Mellomen. The lyrics were written by Bob Hilliard and were arranged by Harry Simeone for treble voices.

The song plays during the opening and end credits. Izumi Yukimura sang her own theme song for the Japanese release of the film. The "dreamy" song has become a jazz standard that has been performed by Bill Evans, Oscar Peterson, Dave Brubeck, and others. In his book The History of Jazz, Ted Gioia cites "Alice in Wonderland" as one of Evans's most beautiful performances, likening its "pristine beauty" to his "Waltz for Debby". Evans recorded it at the Village Vanguard which featured on his 1961 album Sunday at the Village Vanguard. Rosemary Clooney recorded the ballad with "The Unbirthday Song" which also appeared on the soundtrack to the movie, and Michael Feinstein has also recorded it along with the other songs from the movie in a medley. The original recording for the film was in the key of G major, but the jazz standard is usually played in C major, as it was by both Evans and Peterson.
