= Music for an Aquatic Ballet =

John Cage song

- by John Cage
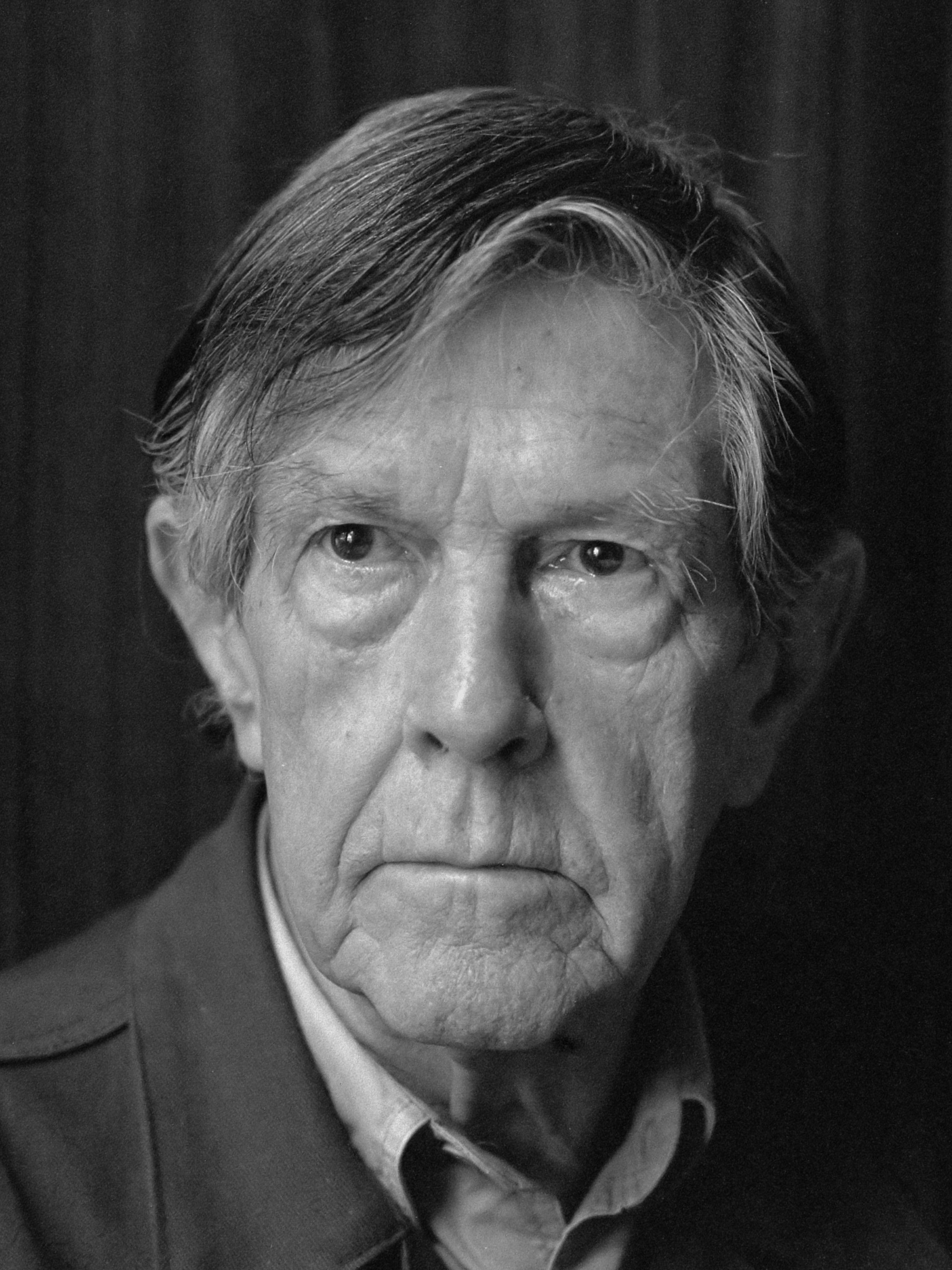
- The composer, in 1988
- Key: Unknown
- Genre: Contemporary classical music
- Form: Unknown (possibly a ballet)
- Composed: Unknown, possibly in 1938
- Performed: 2 July 1938: Los Angeles, California
- Scoring: Water gongs, unknown

Music for an Aquatic Ballet is the most commonly used title to refer to an untitled composition by American avant-garde composer John Cage. It was presumably finished in 1938, for its performance at the National Aquatic Show in Los Angeles. Even though the score of the composition is lost and has never been published nor performed after its premiere, some of Cage's fellow musicians have loosely reconstructed it.

== Composition ==
This composition was commissioned by the Physical Education Department of the University of California, Los Angeles to celebrate the National Aquatic Show at the Olympic Swim Stadium in Los Angeles, which was held on July 2, 1938. Since the score is lost, there is debate over the duration and the instrumentation of the original composition. However, the event was played and directed by John Cage himself, and the performance involved both synchronized swimming and live music. It was at this time when John Cage started experimenting with submerged tom-toms and gongs, so that the swimmers could follow the music even when they were completely submerged.

The work was never published nor performed again, but the idea of submerging instruments became increasingly interesting to Cage, as he experimented with it further in later works, such as First Construction in Metal. The composition's title is still unknown, since no specific details about it are mentioned in Cage's notes. However, it is commonly referred to as Music for an Aquatic Ballet, which is the description provided in Cage's book Silence: Lectures and Writings.

== Reconstruction ==
Since the composition is lost and has not been mentioned many times in John Cage's papers, there is little information about instrumentation, duration and structure. The composition was first reconstructed by Roberto Fabbriciani and Jonathan Faralli in 2011, in a version for flute, percussion and tape. Here, the musicians attempted not only to reconstruct the original composition but also the event in which it took place. For this reason, they used sounds of a stadium audience cheering, water splashes and typical underwater sounds. While there might not be much resemblance to the original 1938 composition, both musicians were Cage's friends and had worked together with him in the past. The recording of this piece was released in 2012 by Brilliant Classics.
