= Warp Works & Twentieth Century Masters =

Live album by London Sinfonietta
- Released: 2006
- Recorded: 2003–2005
- Genre: Electronic, ambient techno, minimalist, process, contemporary classical music
- Label: Warp Records

Warp Works & Twentieth Century Masters is a 2-CD set consisting of live performances by the London Sinfonietta, released by Warp Records in 2006. It contains a mix of contemporary classical and minimalist music by John Cage, György Ligeti, Conlon Nancarrow, Steve Reich, Karlheinz Stockhausen, and Edgard Varèse, as well as instrumental versions of songs by Warp Records members Aphex Twin and Squarepusher. They were recorded live between 2003 and 2005.

== Track listing ==
All songs performed by the London Sinfonietta except where noted.

Disc 1
No.	Title	Writer(s)	Performer	Length
1.	"Jynweythek Ylow" (^{[c]})	Aphex Twin	Clive Williamson
2.	"Hy A Scullyas Lyf Adhagrow" (^{[c]})	Aphex Twin	Clive Williamson
3.	"Study #7" (Arranged by Yvar Mikhashoff^{[a]})	Conlon Nancarrow
4.	"Sonatas I & II" (^{[a]})	John Cage	Rolf Hind
5.	"Violin Phase" (^{[c]})	Steve Reich	Clio Gould
6.	"First Construction in Metal" (^{[c]})	Cage
7.	"The Tide" (Arranged by David Horne^{[a]})	Squarepusher
8.	"Spiral" (^{[a]})	Karlheinz Stockhausen	Simon Haram & Sound Intermedia

Disc 2
No.	Title	Writer(s)	Performer	Length
1.	"Sonata XII" (^{[a]})	Cage	Rolf Hind
2.	"Ionization" (^{[c]})	Edgard Varèse
3.	"Six Marimbas" (^{[d]})	Reich
4.	"Conc 2 Symmetriac" (Arranged by Fraser Trainer and Sound Intermedia^{[b]})	Squarepusher
5.	"Sonatas V & VI" (^{[a]})	Cage	Rolf Hind
6.	"AFX237 v.7" (Arranged by Horne^{[a]})	Aphex Twin
7.	"Chamber Concerto - 1st movement: Corrente" (^{[a]})	György Ligeti
8.	"Chamber Concerto - 2nd movement: Calmo, Sostenuto" (^{[a]})	Ligeti
9.	"Chamber Concerto - 3rd movement: Movimento Preciso e Meccanico" (^{[a]})	Ligeti
10.	"Chamber Concerto - 4th movement: Presto" (^{[a]})	Ligeti
11.	"Polygon Window" (Arranged by Kenneth Hesketh^{[c]})	Aphex Twin

- ^{^{[a]}} Recorded at Royal Festival Hall, March 8, 2003.
- ^{^{[b]}} Recorded at Brighton Dome, March 23, 2004.
- ^{^{[c]}} Recorded at Liverpool Philharmonic Hall, March 27, 2004
- ^{^{[d]}} Recorded at Henry Wood Hall, April 11, 2005

== Live performances ==
=== Warsaw ===
Selected arrangements created as part of the Warp Works & Twentieth Century Masters project were performed in Warsaw, Poland on May 13, 2004, as part of the "Turning Sounds 2" International Meeting (curated by Antoni Beksiak):

1. Squarepusher (arr. Morgan Hayes): Port Rhombus
2. Squarepusher (arr. David Horne): Disintegrations no. 1: The Tide
3. Boards of Canada (arr. David Horne): Disintegrations no. 2: Pete Standing Alone
4. Aphex Twin (arr. David Horne): Disintegrations no. 3: afx237 v. 7

by Białystok Symphony Orchestra under Franck Ollu, alongside Heiner Goebbels' Suite for Sampler and Orchestra, Bernhard Lang's DW8, as well as playing back the original electronic versions of the Warp artists' tracks.
