= Bob Hilliard =

American lyricist (1918–1971)

Background information
- Born: Hilliard Goldsmith; January 28, 1918; New York City, New York, United States
- Died: February 1, 1971 (aged 53) Hollywood, California, United States
- Occupation: Lyricist
- Years active: Mid-1940s–1971

Bob Hilliard (born Hilliard Goldsmith; January 28, 1918 – February 1, 1971) was an American lyricist. He wrote the words for the songs: "Alice in Wonderland", "In the Wee Small Hours of the Morning", "Any Day Now", "Dear Hearts and Gentle People", "Our Day Will Come", "My Little Corner of the World", "Tower of Strength" and "Seven Little Girls (Sitting in the Back Seat)".

== Career ==
After finishing high school, Hilliard began working as a lyricist in Tin Pan Alley. At the age of 28 he had his first success with "The Coffee Song". During his Broadway years, Hilliard wrote successful scores for both Angel in the Wings (1947) and Hazel Flagg (1953). He also worked as lyricist of the film score for Alice in Wonderland (1951). This included providing the words to the theme song, as well as "I'm Late" and the unused Cheshire Cat song "I'm Odd." The 1954 comedy film Living It Up included his songs "Money Burns a Hole in My Pocket" and "That's What I Like."

Hilliard had later success as co-composer of the 1960s classic "Our Day Will Come." The song was a No. 1 hit on the US Billboard Hot 100 chart in 1963 for Ruby & the Romantics.

In 1968, he also co-wrote "You Make Me Think About You" with Robert Mersey, the instrumental version of which was included in Doris Day's final film, With Six You Get Eggroll, but Doris Day did not sing the vocal version. That version was sung by Johnny Mathis. Mathis's single (arranged and conducted by Mersey) was released by Columbia Records. The single peaked at 35 on Billboard's Easy Listening Chart.

Hilliard worked as lyricist and composer with a number of other composers and lyricists over the decades, including Burt Bacharach, Carl Sigman, Jule Styne, Mort Garson, Sammy Mysels, Dick Sanford (né Richard Young Sandford; 1896–1981), Milton DeLugg, Philip Springer, Lee Pockriss and Sammy Fain.

== Personal life ==
Hilliard married actress Jacqueline Dalya in 1949. He died of a heart attack at his Hollywood home on February 1, 1971, at the age of 53.

== Awards and honors ==
Hilliard was posthumously inducted into the Songwriters Hall of Fame in 1983.

== Song credits ==
Between the mid-1940s and the early 1960s, Hilliard co-wrote such hits as:

- "Alice in Wonderland"
- "Any Day Now"
- "A Poor Man's Roses (Or a Rich Man's Gold)"
- "A Strawberry Moon"
- "Au Revoir is Goodbye with a Smile"
- "The Autumn Waltz"
- "Be My Life's Companion"
- "The Big Brass Band from Brazil"
- "Bouquet of Roses"
- "Careless Hands"
- "Civilization" aka "Bongo, Bongo, Bongo"
- "The Coffee Song"
- "Dear Hearts and Gentle People"

- "Dearie"
- "Don't Ever Be Afraid to Go Home"
- "Don't You Believe It"
- "Every Street's a Boulevard in Old New York"
- "Feet of Clay"
- "From the Candy Store on the Corner to the Chapel on the Hill"
- "How Do You Speak To An Angel?"
- "I'm Late"
- "In the Wee Small Hours of the Morning"
- "Little Betty Falling Star"
- "Mention My Name In Sheboygan"
- "Mexican Divorce"
- "Money Burns a Hole in My Pocket"
- "Moonlight Gambler"
- "My Little Corner of the World"

- "No Well On Earth"
- "Our Day Will Come"
- "Please Stay"
- "Red Silk Stockings and Green Perfume"
- "Seven Little Girls (Sitting in the Back Seat)"
- "Stay With the Happy People"
- "That's What I Like"
- "The Thousand Islands Song"
- "Tower of Strength"
- "Very Good Advice"
- "Wanted Man"
- "(Why Did I Tell You I Was Going To) Shanghai"
- "You Make Me Think About You"
- "You're Following Me"
