= Hoop-Dee-Doo =

Single
- Published: 1950
- Composer: Milton Delugg
- Lyricist: Frank Loesser

"Hoop-Dee-Doo" is a popular song published in 1950 with music by Milton Delugg and lyrics by Frank Loesser.

The lyrics of this song are sometimes cited for their use of the phrase "soup and fish", meaning a man's formal dinner suit. This phrase is commonly thought to have originated with P. G. Wodehouse's "Bertie Wooster" stories, but according to the website World Wide Words, there was an earlier American usage.

== Recorded versions ==
=== Charting versions ===
The most popular recording of the song was made by Perry Como and The Fontane Sisters, with Mitchell Ayres' Orchestra. It was recorded on March 16, 1950, and released by RCA Victor Records as catalog number 20-3747 (78 rpm) and 47-3747 (45 rpm) in the United States, and by His Master's Voice as a 78 rpm record, catalog number B-9925. The flip side of the US release by RCA Victor was "On the Outgoing Tide", and the flip side of the UK release by His Master's Voice was "I Wanna Go Home (with You)". It first reached the Billboard Best Seller chart on April 21, 1950, and lasted 17 weeks on the chart, peaking at number 4. Other sources indicate that the Como recording of the song reached number one on some of the Billboard charts of the day.

The recording by Kay Starr was recorded on March 31, 1950, and released by Capitol Records as catalog number 980, with the flip side "A Woman Likes to Be Told". It first reached the Billboard Best Seller chart on May 12, 1950, and lasted eight weeks on the chart, peaking at number 14. Other sources indicate that the Starr recording of the song reached number 2 on some of the Billboard charts of the day, first entering the chart on May 6. The Starr recording was also issued by Capitol in the United Kingdom in 1950 as catalog number CL-13309, with the flip side "Poor Papa".

The recording by Doris Day was recorded in March 1950 and released by Columbia Records as catalog number 38771, with the flip side "Marriage Ties". It first reached the Billboard Best Seller chart on May 19, 1950, and lasted five weeks on the chart, peaking at number 18. Other sources indicate that Day's recording of the song reached number 17 on some of the Billboard charts of the day, first entering the chart on May 6.

The recording by Russ Morgan and his orchestra was released by Decca Records as catalog numbers 24986 and 28024. It entered the Billboard chart on May 27, 1950, and peaked at position number 15. This recording was issued in the United Kingdom by Brunswick Records as catalog number 04510. All versions were released with the flip side "Down the Lane" except that Decca 28024 was issued with the flip side "Metro Polka".
