= Imaginary Landscape =

Series of compositions by John Cage

Imaginary Landscape is a series of five musical pieces by American composer John Cage, all of which include instruments or other elements requiring electricity. The series comprises the following works:

- Imaginary Landscape No. 1 (1939)
  - for two variable-speed turntables, frequency recordings, muted piano, and cymbal
- Imaginary Landscape No. 2 (March No. 1) (1942)
  - for tin cans, conch shell, ratchet, bass drum, buzzers, water gong, metal wastebasket, lion's roar and amplified coil of wire
- Imaginary Landscape No. 3 (1942)
  - for tin cans, muted gongs, audio frequency oscillators, variable speed turntables with frequency recordings and recordings of generator whines, amplified coil of wire, amplified marimbula (a Caribbean instrument similar to the African thumb piano), and electric buzzer
- Imaginary Landscape No. 4 (March No. 2) (1951)
  - for 24 performers at 12 radios
- Imaginary Landscape No. 5 (1952)
  - for magnetic tape recording of any 42 phonograph records

== See also ==
- List of compositions by John Cage
