= The Autumn Waltz =

"The Autumn Waltz" is a popular song with music by Cy Coleman and lyrics by Bob Hilliard, published in 1956.

The recording by Tony Bennett was released by Columbia Records as catalog number 40770. It first reached the Billboard charts on November 17, 1956 and lasted four weeks on the chart. On the Disk Jockey chart, it peaked at No. 18; on the composite chart of the top 100 songs, it reached No. 41.
