= Imaginary Landscape No. 1 =

1939 composition by John Cage

- by John Cage
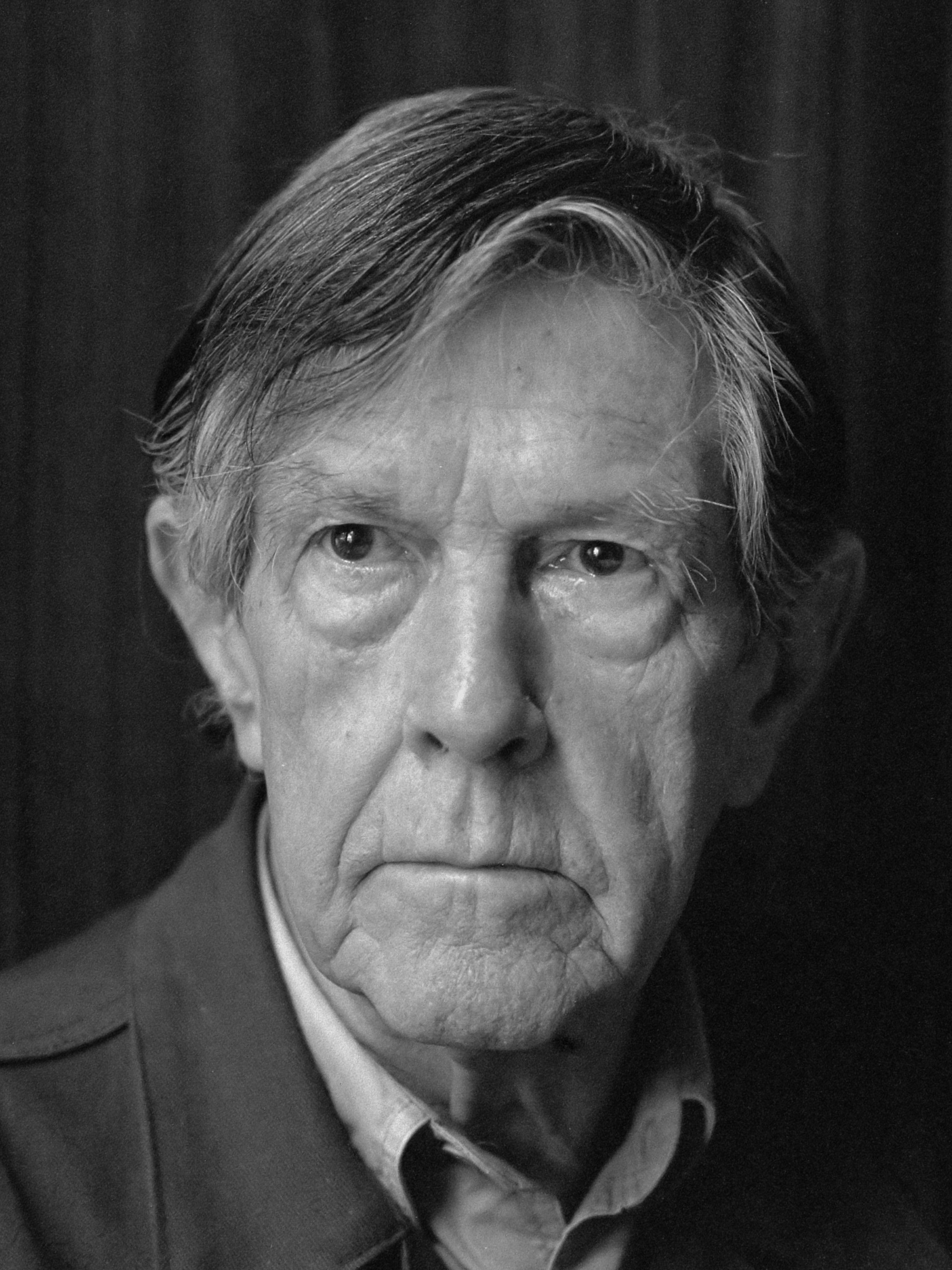
- John Cage (1988)
- Composed: 1939
- Performed: March 24, 1939 - Seattle
- Published: Edition Peters
- Movements: 1
- Scoring: Four performers

Imaginary Landscape No. 1 is a composition for records of constant and variable frequency, large chinese cymbal and string piano by American composer John Cage and the first in the series of Imaginary Landscapes. It was composed in 1939.

== Composition ==
John Cage wrote this composition while he was living in Seattle, earning money by making music for dancers, such as Music for an Aquatic Ballet. Having studied for some time with Arnold Schoenberg in the past drew him closer to serial organization into his studies regarding temporal structure. In Seattle, he had the chance to experiment with the different possibilities of the prepared piano, which allowed him to create new percussive sonorities without having to use several instruments and performers. At this time, Henry Cowell, a pioneer in advanced avant-garde techniques for the piano (such as plucking the strings from the inside, using clusters, etc.), was his mentor. However, even though percussion was fairly established in the 30s (Ionisation, considered a historical breakthrough work, was composed in 1930), electric equipment used in musical performance was rare and largely unexplored.

Cage was working in a radio studio when he started working on this piece, which was meant to be a short piece of music as part of the accompaniment to a performance of Jean Cocteau's Les mariés de la tour Eiffel. The piece was never meant to be performed on-site but was rather meant to be either recorded or broadcast. However, as most material from this period, the test recordings are now considered lost. This way, the first known performance took place in two different studio rooms, the sounds being picked up by two microphones and mixed in a control booth. Even though in contemporary performance this entails no technological challenge, trying to play the piece in the conditions it was first devised is impractical.

This piece was finished around early spring 1939 and was first performed by Cage, Xenia Cage, Doris Dennison and Margaret Jansen in the Cornish School radio station in Seattle on March 24, 1939. The piece was also later used in Marion Van Tuyl's Horror Dream. It was later published by Edition Peters. Given its unusual nature at the time, it is often credited as the first electroacoustic music ever composed. In 1960, Hi-Fi/Stereo Review called it "one of the earliest examples of Musique concrète," and wrote that the recording "comprises mostly of variable and constant frequency tones. This is great movie music–ghastly and gripping, infernal and marvelous. It is a vision of haunted houses, haunted minds, and haunted souls; its use in a ballet called Horror Dream must have been overwhelming."

== Structure ==
This piece consists of only one movement and has a total duration of six minutes. It is scored for four performers: two of them in control of two variable-speed phono turntables and playing frequency recordings, a muted piano, and a cymbal. However, it is not meant to be performed on stage, but rather in a radio studio, where it can be either recorded or broadcast. Its tempo is a steady ♩ = 60.

Player 1 should have two records, a Victor Frequency Record 84522 B and a Victor Constant Note Record No. 24 84519 B. These two records consist of just one note being played, and the performer has to manipulate the speed at which it is being played using a clutch to change the note. The speed oscillates between 33⅓ RPM and 78 RPM. Rhythms were initially planned to be played by raising and lowering the needle, which caused undesired sounds. Player 2 was meant to have only one record, a Victor Frequency Record 84522 A, oscillating between 33⅓ RPM and 78 RPM. Player 3 was meant to be a percussionist to play the large chinese cymbal. Finally, Player 4 would play the piano in two ways: sweeping the bass strings with his hand with the gong beats indicated in the score and muting some strings with the palm of their hand.

== Recordings ==
The following is an incomplete list of recordings of Imaginary Landscape No. 1:

- The Maelström Percussion Ensemble recorded of the piece. The recording took place between May 28 and June 1, 1995, and was released by Hat Hut.
- The Helios Quartet recorded the piece in 2001. The recording was released in January 2002 by Wergo Records.
- The Ensemble Musica Negativa made a performance in 2008, which was recorded and released by EMI Classics in 2008.
- The Italian Ensemble Prometeo recorded this piece in 2009. The recording was later released in 2012 by Stradivarius.
- The Amadinda Percussion Group also recorded the piece later in 2011. The recording was released in April 2011 by Hungaroton.
- The Percussion Group Cincinnati also performed this piece in 2011. It was recorded and released by Mode Records both on CD and DVD.
