= Guitar Concerto (Villa-Lobos) =

1951 composition by Heitor Villa-Lobos

Concerto for Guitar and Small Orchestra
- Concerto by Heitor Villa-Lobos
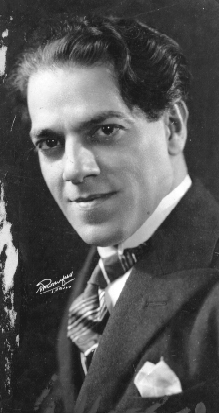
- Heitor Villa-Lobos c. 1922
- Catalogue: W501 (W502)
- Composed: 1951: Rio de Janeiro
- Dedication: Andrès Segovia
- Published: 1956: Paris (reduction for guitar and piano)
- Publisher: Max Eschig
- Recorded: 1969: Paris, Turibio Santos, guitar; Jean-François Paillard Chamber Orchestra, conducted by Jean-François Paillard. First released in 1970 on Erato MCE 19026 (cassette) and STU 70566 (LP).
- Duration: 18 min
- Movements: Four
- Scoring: guitar; small orchestra

Premiere
- Date: 6 February 1956
- Location: Houston
- Conductor: Heitor Villa-Lobos
- Performers: Andrés Segovia and Houston Symphony Orchestra

The Guitar Concerto, W501 (piano reduction: W502), is a work for solo guitar and small orchestra written by the Brazilian composer Heitor Villa-Lobos in Rio de Janeiro in 1951. A typical performance lasts about 18 minutes.

== History ==
The concerto was written for the Spanish guitarist Andrés Segovia, to whom the score is dedicated. Initially in three movements and titled Fantasia concertante, Villa-Lobos later added a cadenza at Segovia's request, and changed the title to Concerto for Guitar and Small Orchestra.

According to another version of the story, the situation was quite the reverse: Segovia commissioned the work with the stipulation that there should be no cadenza and the work be titled Fantasia concertante. Villa-Lobos, however, ignored these demands, supplying an extended cadenza and insisting the work be called a concerto.

The concerto was first performed on 6 February 1956 in Houston, Texas, by Andrés Segovia and the Houston Symphony Orchestra, conducted by the composer. A reduction for guitar and piano was published in Paris by Max Eschig in 1955, who also published the full score in 1971.

== Music ==
The orchestra consists of flute, oboe, clarinet, bassoon, horn, trombone, and strings.

The work is in four movements:

1. Allegro preciso – Poco meno
2. Andantino e Andante
3. Cadenza: Quasi allegro – Andante – Quasi allegro – Poco moderato
4. Allegro non troppo

The first movement is built from two strongly contrasting motifs, the first one energetic and repetitive, the second lyrical, based on the style of certain folk tunes from the northeast of Brazil. A recapitulation of the initial material, transposed a minor third upward, is followed by a development section and stretto, diminishing and accelerating to the end of the movement.

The second movement is in ternary form with alterations to the returning opening part (ABA'), ending with an extended coda. Each of the main sections is cast in either rounded binary or ternary form. The key of the movement is E minor, with the central portion beginning also on E (but alternating between E minor, E Dorian, and E Phrygian) and modulating to B minor at the end. One of the modifications to the return of the A material is a modulation at the end to A minor. The coda makes a dramatic shift by beginning in the distant key of A♭ major but returns to E minor at the end.

The cadenza is in four unmetered sections with different tempo markings (Quasi allegro – Andante – Quasi allegro – Poco moderato) and is so substantial in length that it functions as a separate movement.

The last movement is musically weaker than the first three, being based "almost exclusively on certain techniques of music-making without and characteristic musico-structural substance". Toward the end of the movement various modulations emerge in the final episode, in 4/4 meter, featuring technically brilliant passages for the soloist. Despite the solid presence of E minor in all of the preceding movements, the finale is in A minor. Combined with a rather inconclusive melodic closure, the ending effect is unconvincing.
