= Roger Mozian =

American musician

- Also known as: Roger King Mozian
- Born: June 29, 1927; New York City, New York, U.S.
- Died: May 16, 1963 (aged 35) Miami, Florida, U.S.
- Genres: Jazz, swing, Latin, lounge music
- Occupations: Musician, arranger, composer, bandleader
- Instrument: Trumpet
- Years active: c.1948–1962
- Labels: Clef, MGM, Columbia

Roger "King" Mozian (June 29, 1927 – May 16, 1963) was an American trumpeter, composer, arranger and bandleader.

== Career ==
Born in New York City, the son of Armenian immigrants, Mozian attended New York University and began playing trumpet in jazz and Latin groups in the city in the late 1940s. His composition "Asia Minor" was recorded by Machito and became successful in 1950. He continued to write and perform, forming his own band and making his first recordings as Roger King Mozian in 1953 on the Clef label established by Norman Granz. His orchestra became popular in and around New York, and in 1958 he recorded the album Just Mozian Along for Decca Records.

Around 1960, he recorded several albums for MGM Records, highlighting Latin, Middle Eastern and mainstream rhythms, aimed primarily at the new market for stereophonic recordings, and later incorporated some rock and roll rhythms. His albums included Spectacular Brass, Spectacular Percussion, Spectacular Brass Goes Cha-Cha-Cha, Spectacular Percussion Goes Latin, The Colorful Music of Roger Mozian, and finally, in 1962, El Twist!!!.

== Illness, death, and legal cases ==
Mozian was diagnosed with pulmonary tuberculosis in 1951. It was treated medically and remained dormant until 1962 when it re-emerged. Mozian then declined to have orthodox medical treatment, turning instead to a chiropractor, Dr. Christopher Gian-Cursio, who treated Mozian without medical intervention but with a vegetarian diet and fasting. Mozian continued the regime in Florida at a clinic run by another chiropractor, Dr. Bernard Epstein. Although Mozian was briefly treated at a conventional hospital in Miami when his condition worsened, he died soon afterwards, aged 35.

Despite Mozian choosing their form of treatment, Gian-Cursio and Epstein were charged with manslaughter through criminal negligence, recognizing that Mozian's illness could have been treated more effectively through approved conventional methods. They were convicted, and lost their appeal. The case, Gian-Cursio v. State, 180 So. 2d 396 (Fla. Dist. Ct. App. 1965), has subsequently been cited as a precedent in case law.

== Discography ==
- The Colorful Music of Roger Mozian, Clef, 10" LP, 1954
- Dancing Along a Rainbow, Decca, 1957
- Just Mozian Along, Decca, 1958
- Spectacular Brass, MGM, 1960
- Spectacular Percussion, MGM, 1960
- Spectacular Brass Goes Cha-Cha-Cha, MGM, 1961
- Spectacular Percussion Goes Latin, MGM, 1961
- El Twist!!!, Columbia, 1962
