= Be My Life's Companion =

Song
- Published: 1951
- Composer(s): Milton De Lugg
- Lyricist(s): Bob Hilliard

"Be My Life's Companion" is a popular song. It was written by Bob Hilliard (lyricist) and Milton De Lugg (composer) and published in 1951.

== Major recorded versions ==
Best selling versions of the song were recorded by Rosemary Clooney and by the Mills Brothers, both in 1951. The Clooney recording was recorded in December 1951 and released by Columbia Records as catalog number 39631, with the flip side "Why Don't You Love Me?". The recording first entered the Billboard chart on February 8, 1952, lasting three weeks and peaking at number 18.

The Mills Brothers' recording was recorded on November 14, 1951, and released by Decca Records as catalog number 27889. The recording first entered the Billboard chart on January 25, 1952, lasting 10 weeks and peaking at position number 21.

== Other recorded versions ==
- Frankie Carle (released by RCA Victor Records as catalog number 20-4540, with the flip side "Wheel of Fortune").
- Mindy Carson (released by RCA Victor Records as catalog number 20-4454, with the flip side "Tuh-Pocket, Tuh-Pocket").
- Art Lund (released by MGM Records as catalog number 11133, with the flip side "Business in Missouri").
- Skeets McDonald (released by Capitol Records as catalog number 1967, with the flip side "Tell Me Why").
- Hawkshaw Hawkins (released by King Records as catalog number 1039-AA, with the flip side "Everybody's Got a Girl But Me".
- The Mills Brothers recorded the song again for their album The Mills Brothers – Great Hits (1958).
- Kitty Kallen included the song on her album Honky Tonk Angel, Country Songs with a City Flavor (1961).
- Louis Armstrong and His All Stars on the 1964 album Hello, Dolly! (released by Kapp Records as catalog number KS-3364).
