= Due pezzi (Berio) =

- by Luciano Berio
- Composed: 1951
- Performed: 1952
- Scoring: violin; piano

Due pezzi, literally meaning "two pieces", is a composition for violin and piano, written by the Italian composer Luciano Berio in 1951. It was published by Suvini Zerboni. The first performance—by pianist Seymour Lipkin and violinist Lorin Maazel, to whom the work is dedicated—took place during the 1952 Tanglewood Music Festival. Berio composed these pieces and three other works (Cinque variazioni for piano, Chamber Music for female voice, clarinet, harp, and cello, and the Variations for chamber orchestra) in response to meeting Luigi Dallapiccola. As the composer says: "with these works I entered the 'melodic' world of Dallapiccola and these same works allowed me to leave it".
