= Baylor University Golden Wave Band =

College marching band in Waco, Texas

Golden Wave Band
- School: Baylor University
- Location: Waco, Texas, USA
- Conference: Big 12
- Founded: 1902
- Director: Dr. Isaiah Odajima
- Assistant Director: Dr. Stuart Ivey
- Members: 300
- Fight song: "Baylor Fight: Bear Down, You Bears!"
- Website: www.baylor.edu/gwb/

The Golden Wave Band or GWB is a 300-member marching band associated with Baylor University in Texas, United States. The band has gone by many names over the years including the Baylor Bear band, the Golden Wave, BUGWB (the Baylor University Golden Wave Band), and the Golden Wave Band. The band is composed of students from all over the country, studying in a wide range of majors from Math, Science, Engineering, Pre-Med, Business, Music and more.

The GWB performs a new show, with both traditional and contemporary marching and music styles, at each home game and takes the current show with them to the away games and bowl games that they perform at. The band has also been known to perform at marching competitions at the regional and state level such as the Texas UIL State Marching Contest.

The Golden Wave Band came together in 1902, initially taking the form of a regulation military band. This iteration of the band operated from within the university's R.O.T.C. program. With the onset of World War I, the band separated from this military division and became known as the Baylor Bear Band. The marching band struggled during the 1910s, 1920s, and 1930s because, like most band programs around the nation, the world wars and years of depression led to a decline in funding and participation. However, the band began truly to flourish around mid-century as attendance at Baylor University increased and enrollment in the marching band itself expanded.

The Golden Wave Band became known by its current name after new uniforms were purchased in 1928. These uniforms, first worn at a Baylor-SMU football game, were crafted using a bright, golden fabric. The origin of the name "Golden Wave Marching Band" is, nevertheless, something of a mystery. According to one source, a reporter coined the phrase in 1929 as the Band was touring West Texas. Upon seeing these new uniforms, he reportedly commented that the band was marching across the land like a golden wave. According to another legend, a reporter coined the phrase around the same time after watching a line of band members disembark from a bus for a football game, believing that they looked like a wave of gold.
