= (Why Did I Tell You I Was Going To) Shanghai =

Song
- Written: Unknown
- Composer(s): Milton De Lugg
- Lyricist(s): Bob Hilliard

"(Why Did I Tell You I Was Going To) Shanghai" is a popular song written by Bob Hilliard (lyricist) and Milton De Lugg (composer).

== Recordings ==
It was recorded by Doris Day in 1951 and was a big hit for her. Other charting versions were recorded by Bing Crosby and by the Billy Williams Quartet.

The recording by Doris Day was released by Columbia Records as catalog number 39423, with the flip side "My Life's Desire". It first reached the Billboard chart on June 22, 1951, and lasted 17 weeks on the chart, peaking at number 9.

Bing Crosby's version was recorded for Decca Records on June 8, 1951, with Dave Barbour and his Orchestra and it charted briefly in the Billboard listings at number 21 on September 8, 1951.

A recording by the Billy Williams Quartet was released by MGM Records as catalog number 10998, with the flip side, "The Wondrous Word". It first reached the Billboard chart on August 10, 1951, and lasted six weeks on the chart, peaking at number 20.
