= Guillaume Landré =

Dutch composer (1905–1968)

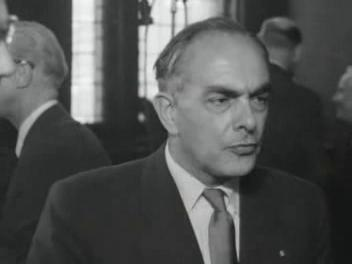

Guillaume Landré (24 February 1905 in The Hague – 6 November 1968 in Amsterdam) was a Dutch composer of operas, 4 symphonies, and chamber music. His father, Willem Landré (1874–1948) was also a composer; Guillaume studied under him. He also studied under Willem Pijper who had some influence on Landré's early works. Later in his career Landré experimented with serial techniques and jazz influences. From 1950 to 1962 he acted as chairman of the Dutch Society of Composers. In addition to composing he also studied and taught law.
