= String Quartet No. 2 (Enescu) =

Chamber music work by George Enescu

String Quartet
- No. 2
- by George Enescu
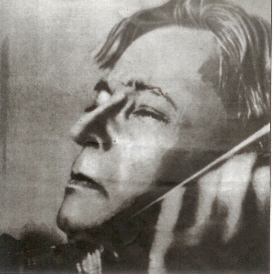
- George Enescu in the 1940s
- Key: G major
- Opus: 22, No. 2
- Composed: 1950–1951
- Dedication: Elizabeth Sprague Coolidge
- Performed: 7 February 1954 Boston Public Library
- Published: 1954
- Duration: 25 min
- Movements: 4

The String Quartet No. 2 in G major, Op. 22, No. 2, is a chamber music work by the Romanian composer George Enescu, composed mainly between 1950 and 1951, though it has a lengthy pre-history and received a number of revisions in 1952 and possibly early 1953. The score is dedicated to the American pianist, composer, and arts patron, Elizabeth Sprague Coolidge. A performance of it lasts about 25 minutes.

== History ==
There are four undated preliminary sketches for the Second String Quartet, made by Enescu starting from about the time of completion of the First Quartet in 1920, or even earlier. The first of these, containing all of the thematic material for a four-movement quartet, may even have been made before the First World War. The second and third drafts are thought to date from the early 1920s, and the fourth probably from some time in the 1930s.

In June 1950, in Paris, Enescu began composing his Second Quartet anew, finishing its fifth (and first complete) version on 30 January 1951. Characteristically dissatisfied, he immediately set about a thorough rewriting of the score. Each movement of the manuscript of this sixth version is signed by the composer and precisely dated: the first movement (pp. 1–10) is dated 14 February 1951; the second movement (pp. 10–19) is dated 22 February 1951; the third movement (pp. 20–30) is dated 14 March 1951; the fourth movement (pp. 30–45) is dated "Paris ce 30 mai (1^{r} X^{bre}) 1951". A further adjustment to the last seven bars of the score was made on 1 October 1951, on an addendum sheet attached to the cello part of the autograph parts now in the George Enescu Museum in Bucharest, with a note in the composer's hand reading "2de version (definitive) des dernières mesures du 2d Quatuor à cordes (sol majeur), Georges Enesco, op. 22 n° 2". This still was not quite the end of the story, however.

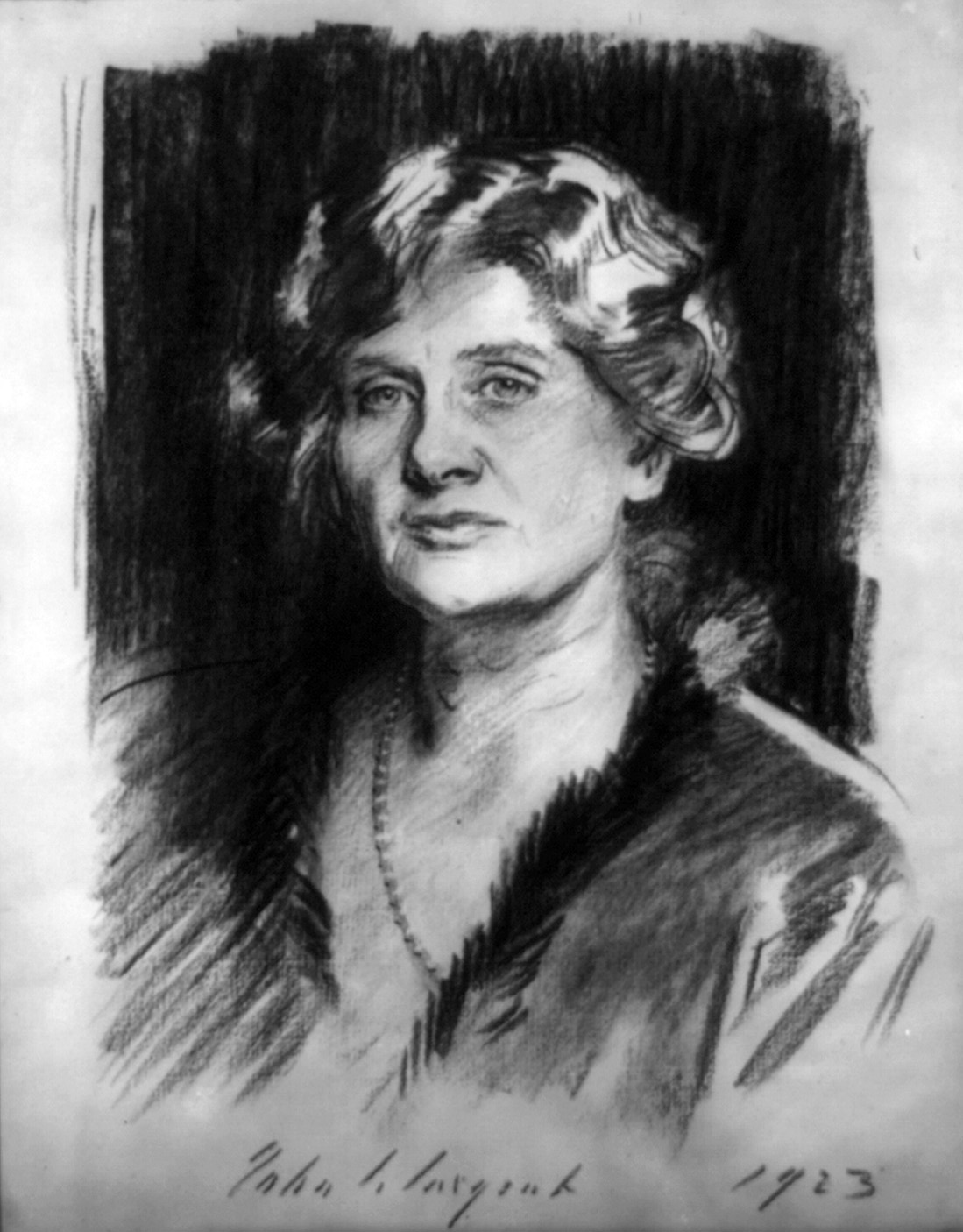
Elizabeth Sprague Coolidge, dedicatee of the Second Quartet

In 1952 Harold Spivacke, Chief of the Music Division of the Library of Congress in Washington, D. C., wrote to Enescu in Paris offering a commission from the Koussevitzky Foundation of the Library of Congress for a new chamber music work. Enescu replied on 7 December 1952 that he had no new work in preparation and consequently could not accept the advance proposal from the Koussevitzky Foundation, but he had just finished his Second String Quartet, dedicated to Mrs. Elizabeth Sprague Coolidge. He was just about to make final revisions to this score and promised to send it to Washington as soon as it was ready. Enescu must subsequently have learned of plans to have the quartet performed in Boston because, on 21 June 1953 he wrote again to Dr. Spivacke, saying "My second quartet is on the way to Cambridge. Mr. Morris was to find and menage [sic] that I could have a photostat of both score and parts, beautifully done." The manuscript of the Second String Quartet had in fact already arrived, not in Cambridge but at the Library of Congress. Enescu's letter crossed in the post with an acknowledgment of the manuscript's safe arrival, written on 17 June 1953 by Edward N. Waters, Assistant Chief of the Music Division. This autograph score contains a number of further small adjustments which may have been made as late as the spring of that year. This version is therefore regarded as representing the composer's final thoughts on the quartet.

The parts were duly forwarded to Wolfe Wolfinsohn, leader of the Stradivarius Quartet, who received them in July 1953. They first performed the work in the lecture hall of the Boston Public Library on Copley Square on 7 February 1954 The Sunday-afternoon concert had been arranged by Harold Spivacke on behalf of the Coolidge Foundation, as part of the February meeting of the Music Library Association (Spivacke was in the last year of his term as president of the MLA), which was meeting in Boston that year in honour of the centennial of the Boston Public Library. The members of the Stradivarius Quartet were Wolfe Wolfinsohn and Harry Kobialka, violins, Eugene Lehner, viola, and Alfred Zighera, cello. The Enescu premiere was preceded on the programme by Elizabeth Sprague Coolidge's String Quartet in E minor, and followed by Beethoven's Quartet in E-flat major, Op. 127.

The publication history is correspondingly complex. The first publication, in 1956 by Salabert in Paris, was of a set of parts only (no score). These parts, prepared from an unknown and now-lost manuscript source, were used for a performance at the Dalles Concert Hall in Bucharest by the Radio String Quartet (Mircea Negrescu, Dorian Varga, Marcel Gross, and Ion Fotino), on 19 October 1956, in what was believed in Romania at the time to be the world premiere. Shortly afterward, the same ensemble made the first commercial recording of the work, released on monaural LP ECD-15 from the Electrecord label. A decade later, a set of autograph parts was found bearing the double date "30 May (1 December) 1951", and from these a first score edition along with a new edition of the parts was made by Titus Moisescu, and published in March 1967 by the Editura muzicala in Bucharest in preparation for the Fourth Enescu Festival the following September. It was at a conference held in conjunction with this very festival that the Romanians were astonished to learn for the first time, from a paper presented by the American musicologist Irving Lowens, of the existence of the autograph manuscript score held by the Library of Congress in Washington (together with a set of parts made by a copyist, but with corrections and annotations in Enescu's hand), and that the Quartet had already been premiered in 1954. In the light of these revelations, a further edition taking the Washington autograph into account appeared in 1985.

== Analysis ==
The work consists of four movements:

1. Molto moderato
2. Andante molto sostenuto ed espressivo
3. Allegretto non troppo mosso
4. Con moto molto moderato, energico

The overall plan is very similar to that of Enescu's Octet, written fifty years earlier, in that it is constructed as a vast sonata-allegro form. In this context, the first movement functions as an exposition, the second and third movements serve as the developments, respectively, of the first and second theme groups from the first movement, and the finale is the recapitulation of the whole. Although the layout follows the traditional four-movement pattern for string quartets, Enescu's sometimes unconventional procedures have provoked considerable disagreement when it comes to describing the structure of the individual movements.

== Discography ==
- Georges Enesco: Sonata for Violin and Piano No. 2 in F Minor, Op. 6; String Quartet No. 2, Op. 22, No. 2, in G major. George Enescu, violin; Dinu Lipatti, piano; Rumanian Radio String Quartet. LP recording. 1 disc, 33⅓ rpm, monaural. New York, NY: Monitor Records, 1965.
- George Enescu: Cvartet de coarde nr. 2 în sol major, op. 22, nr. 2; Cvartet nr. 2 pentru pian, vioară, violă, și violoncel în re minor, op. 30. "Voces" String Quartet (Bujor Prelipcean and ?, violins; Gheorghe Haag, viola; Dan Prelipcean, cello). Yvonne Piedemonte-Prelipcean (piano), members of the "Voces" String Quartet (Bujor Prelipcean, violin; Gheorghe Haag, viola; Dan Prelipcean, cello). Recorded in 1981. LP recording, 1 disc: analogue, 33⅓ rpm, stereo, 12 in. Electrecord ST ECE 01854. Romania: Electrecord, 1981.
  - String Quartet No. 2, reissued, coupled with String Quartet No. 1, Op. 22, No. 1, in E-flat major. CD recording, 1 audio disc: digital, stereo, 4¾ in. Olympia Explorer Series. Olympia OCD 413. London: Olympia, 1991. Reissued, Electrecord EDC 662/663. Bucharest: Electrecord, 2005.
- George Enescu: String Quartets Op. 22, nos. 1 & 2. Quatuor Athenaeum Enesco (Constantin Bogdanas and Florin Szigeti, violíns; Dan Iarca, viola; Dorel Fodereanu, cello). Recorded 16–19 May 1992 by Schweizer Radio DRS. CD recording, 1 audio disc: digital, stereo, 4¾ in. CPO 999-0682. Georgsmarienhütte: CPO, [1993].
- Enescu: String Quartets Nos. 1 and 2. Quatuor Ad Libitum (Adrian Berescu and Șerban Mereuță, violins; Bogdan Bișoc, viola; Filip Papa, cello). Recorded in the MoldovaPhilharmonic Hall, Iași, May 1999. CD recording, 1 audio disc: digital, stereo, 4¾ in. Mécénat MusicalNaxos 8.554721. [S.l.]: HNH International, Ltd. 2000.
