= Symphony No. 9 (Villa-Lobos) =

- by Heitor Villa-Lobos
- Villa-Lobos in June 1952
- Catalogue: W510
- Composed: 1952: Rio de Janeiro
- Dedication: Mindinha
- Published: 1952: Paris
- Publisher: Max Eschig
- Recorded: January 1954
- Movements: 4

Premiere
- Performers: Philadelphia Orchestra

Symphony No. 9 is a composition by the Brazilian composer Heitor Villa-Lobos, written in 1952. A performance lasts about twenty minutes.

Villa-Lobos composed his Ninth Symphony in Rio de Janeiro in 1952. It was first performed by the Philadelphia Orchestra, conducted by Eugene Ormandy. The score is dedicated to Mindinha (Arminda Neves d'Almeida), the composer's companion for the last 23 years of his life.

== Instrumentation ==
The symphony is scored for an orchestra consisting of piccolo, 2 flutes, 2 oboes, cor anglais, 2 clarinets, bass clarinet, 2 bassoons, contrabassoon, 4 horns, 4 trumpets, 4 trombones, tuba, percussion (timpani, tam-tam, cymbals, coconut hulls, bass drum, xylophone, and vibraphone), celesta, harp, and strings.

== Analysis ==
The symphony has four movements:

1. Allegro
2. Adagio
3. Scherzo (Vivace)
4. Allegro (giusto)
