= Milton Delugg =

American musician, composer and arranger (1918–2015)

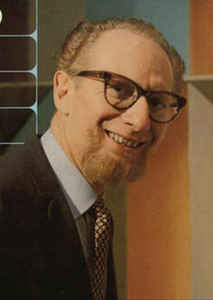
- Milton Delugg in 1967

Background information
- Born: December 2, 1918; Los Angeles, California, U.S.
- Died: April 6, 2015 (aged 96)
- Genres: Jazz; pop
- Occupations: Musician; arranger; conductor; songwriter; musical director
- Instruments: accordion; piano
- Years active: 1936–2013

Milton Delugg (December 2, 1918 – April 6, 2015) was an American musician, composer and arranger.

== Early years ==
Milton Delugg was born in Los Angeles, California. He said, "There aren't any Deluggs. It's not a real name." He believed the family's ancestral name to be D'Luggatch. Delugg's great grandfather said no one could pronounce it so he changed it to "Delugg", with a lower case "L".

Delugg attended the University of California, Los Angeles. His initial musical training was on a piano. Moving to the accordion came as the result of a gift. "When my dad gave me an accordion I learned how to play jazz on it", he said. "I grew up in Los Angeles and it wasn't long before I had a monopoly on any calls for jazz accordionists."

== Military service ==
Delugg served in the Radio Production Unit of the US Army Air Force during World War II. During that time he was a member of (and sometimes soloist with) the 36-piece orchestra of the West Coast Army Air Force Training Center.

== Post-war career ==
A talented accordionist, Delugg appeared in short soundies musicals and occasional movies (like 1949's Jolson Sings Again). He quickly became a successful arranger and composer and worked as bandleader at Slapsie Maxie's Wilshire location in Hollywood. His clients ranged from the America's Junior Miss pageant to soul singer and performer Jackie Wilson, and he was a musician on such radio programs as School Days of the Air, and The Abe Burrows Show. One of his best-known tunes is an arrangement of the song "The Happy Wanderer", and his brassy polka "Hoop Dee Doo" became a game show staple.

In 1950 and 1951, Delugg was musical director, bandleader, and accordionist on Broadway Open House the NBC late-night television program considered to be the forerunner to The Tonight Show. He often played a song he co-wrote, "Orange Colored Sky", which was best remembered as a hit for Nat King Cole. In 1950, Delugg was also orchestra conductor for the short-lived Abe Burrows' Almanac.

In 1953, the Milton Delugg Trio appeared on the short-lived The Bill Cullen Show. Four years later, in 1957, Delugg joined the cast of the Winchell and Mahoney Show.

He composed the tune "Roller Coaster" – recorded by Henri Rene Orchestra on RCA Victor. It was used as the closing theme for the popular Goodson-Todman Productions panel show What's My Line? from the early 1950s until its cancellation in 1967.

Based in New York City, Delugg was also active in the recording industry. In 1958 he produced the Buddy Holly single "Rave On!".

== Television projects ==
Delugg served as NBC's musical director for several decades. In 1966, he took over as the musical director of The Tonight Show Starring Johnny Carson after the departure of Skitch Henderson. He was later replaced by Doc Severinsen in 1968.

Delugg enjoyed a long association with Chuck Barris, beginning as arranger of the original theme to The Newlywed Game in 1966. From 1976 to 1980, he was musical director of The Gong Show (appearing with his "Band With a Thug"). Delugg often appeared on the show in comedy skits, including the characters of bad joke teller "Naso Literatus" and philosopher "Old Drool". Delugg's venerable "Hoop Dee Doo" became a fixture on The Gong Show and was played when the daily winner was chosen.

Delugg also wrote the theme music for other Barris projects including The $1.98 Beauty Show, Camouflage (where, in a throwback to an earlier era of game shows, the music was actually performed live by Delugg and his band), Leave It to the Women, 3's a Crowd, and The New Treasure Hunt. He also recorded new versions of the theme songs to the 1970s versions of The Dating Game and The Newlywed Game, as well as providing the themes for their 1980s revivals. Delugg and sidemen Mark Stevens, Billy Neale, and Ray Neapolitan appeared in Barris's The Gong Show Movie (1980) as The Hollywood Cowboys.

Delugg remained active as musical director of the annual Macy's Thanksgiving Day Parade through 2013, and made one final, on-camera appearance during the 2014 parade.

== Film soundtracks ==
Delugg and his wife Anne composed film scores and songs for the mid-1960s American releases of German and Japanese children's films such as Gulliver's Travels Beyond the Moon, Der gestiefelte Kater (Puss in Boots), Sleeping Beauty, and Snow White and the Seven Dwarfs.

Delugg composed the score for Santa Claus Conquers the Martians, including its theme song, "Hooray for Santa Claus".

== Song credits ==
Delugg composed a number of popular songs that became hits for a variety of artists, including "Orange Colored Sky" (Nat "King" Cole, 1950); "Shanghai" (Doris Day, (1951); "Be My Life's Companion" (The Mills Brothers, 1951); "Shake Hands with Santa Claus" (Louis Prima, 1951); "The Photograph on the Piano" (Georgia Gibbs, 1952); "Just Another Polka" (Eddie Fisher, 1953); and "A Poor Man's Roses (Or a Rich Man's Gold)" (Patsy Cline, 1956).

== Personal life ==
Delugg and his wife, Anne, were married from 1946 until she died in 2002. They had three children. Their daughter died in 8th grade.

Delugg died of a heart failure at his home in Los Angeles, California, on April 6, 2015, at the age of 96.

== Bibliography ==
- Terrace, Vincent. Radio Programs, 1924–1984 (Jefferson, NC: McFarland, 1999) ISBN 0-7864-0351-9

Media offices
Preceded by Skitch Henderson	The Tonight Show bandleader 1966–1967	Succeeded by Doc Severinsen
