= Imaginary Landscape No. 4 (March No. 2) =

- by John Cage
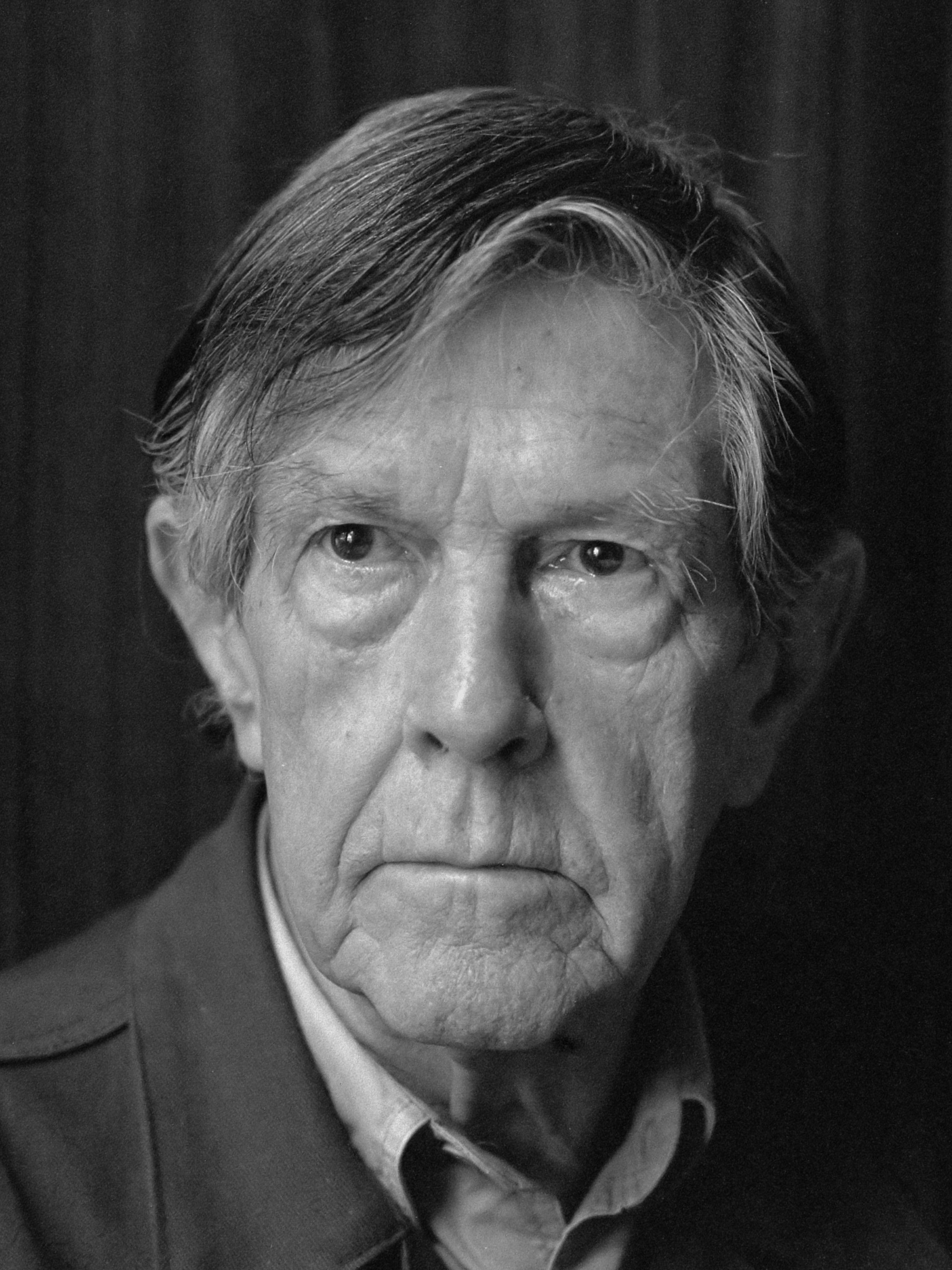
- John Cage (1988)
- Composed: 1951
- Performed: March 1, 1951 - New York
- Published: Edition Peters
- Movements: 1
- Scoring: 12 radios

Imaginary Landscape No. 4 (March No. 2) is a composition for 24 performers on 12 radios and conductor by American composer John Cage and the fourth in the series of Imaginary Landscapes. It is the first installment not to include any percussion instrument at all and Cage's first composition to be based fully on chance operations. It is also the second march in the set of Imaginary Landscapes, after Imaginary Landscape No. 2 (March No. 1). It was composed in 1951.

== Composition ==
As Cage's compositional style developed, he found that, in order to circumvent the listener's wish to find any emotional appeal to music, the composer himself had to detach from his own work and should not have any control on the composition, that is, he had to remove any personal trait that identifies him as a composer. At this time, in 1951, he was also working with his Music of Changes, which was another great step towards chance operations in composition. The first performance of this composition took place at the McMillin Theater at Columbia University, New York, with Cage himself conducting, on May 2, 1951.

The first performance was marked by its low dynamic level (partly due to the fact that the performers were using portable radios), clear distinction of sound events and a thin texture, which was seen as a flaw by the audience. Moreover, due to the late hour of the performance most nearby radio stations were not broadcasting and much of the performance was static. However, according to Cage himself, the Imaginary Landscape No. 4 "was certainly not a rabble-rouser". This was not Cage's last composition to include radios, as he also did it in Speech 1955, Radio Music and Music Walk.

In reference to this, he commented: "It is thus possible to make a musical composition the continuity of which is free of individual taste and memory (psychology) and also of the literature and 'traditions' of the art. The sounds enter the time-space ... centered within themselves, unimpeded by service to abstraction". It was dedicated to Morton Feldman and was published by Edition Peters.

== Structure ==
This piece consists of only one movement and the average duration for it is 4 minutes. It is scored for 12 radios, each radio calling for two performers, and a conductor. Its score looks like a conventional score, with the slight difference that here a half inch equals a quarter note. However, accelerandos and ritardandos are also present in the score. It is prefaced by an extensive explanation on the indication of durations, station tunings, dynamics (numbers ranging from 3 to 15, 3 being turned on but inaudible, 15 being maximum volume). According to Cage, all of these performance parameters were determined by chance operations, rather than conscious decisions.

Each radio requires two performers to use it: one for frequency tuning and the other for the amplitude and timbre changes. This way, what is being publicly broadcast at the time and place of the performance becomes the sonic material of the music, which can be anything, from music and talk to white noise between stations. As in the case of Imaginary Landscape No. 2 (March No. 1), this is no conventional march and has no traits that would identify it as such. To Cage, this was an exercise in abandoning preferences, erasing all will from the piece and, therefore, the very idea of success.

== Recordings ==
The following is an incomplete list of recordings of Imaginary Landscape No. 4 (March No. 2):

- The Maelström Percussion Ensemble recorded of the piece. The recording took place between May 28 and June 1, 1995, and was released by Hat Hut.
- The Italian Ensemble Prometeo recorded this piece in 2009. The recording was later released in 2012 by Stradivarius.
- The Percussion Group Cincinnati also performed this piece in 2011. It was recorded and released by Mode Records both on CD and DVD.
