= Construction (Cage) =

Construction is the title of several pieces by American composer John Cage, all scored for unorthodox percussion instruments. The pieces were composed in 1939–42 while Cage was working at the Cornish School of the Arts in Seattle, Washington, and touring the West Coast with a percussion ensemble he and Lou Harrison had founded. The series comprises three Constructions. A piece titled Fourth Construction, mentioned in several sources, is apparently either an unfinished work from 1942 or, more likely, an early title of the work we now know as Imaginary Landscape No. 2 (March No. 1).

== First Construction (in Metal) ==
First Construction (in Metal) was composed in 1939; its first title was Construction in Metal. It is scored for six percussionists and an assistant. Instruments include, among other things, Japanese and Balinese gongs, Chinese and Turkish cymbals, automobile drum brakes, anvils and a water gong (a gong lowered into water while vibrating, or struck while it is in the water, etc.). A piano is also used, with the assistant applying a metal rod to the strings.

In First Construction, Cage introduced the technique of composing using fixed "rhythmic structures". The idea was extremely important for his development as a composer, and during the next 17 years most of his work was done using the same technique or variations of it. In this particular case the basic structure is 4, 3, 2, 3, 4, and a single unit contains 16 bars. So the composition begins with four units of 16 bars each, then the next section has three units, the third has two, and so on. Each unit is also divided the same way: four bars, then three, then two, etc. The first part of the piece (four units of 16 bars each) was termed "exposition" by Cage, and the ending (which is a separate nine-bar section) "coda". The music itself is built around sixteen motives employed in strictly determined sequences. Both the use of ethnic percussion and the rhythmic proportions technique were inspired in part by Henry Cowell's lectures that Cage attended in New York City in 1933.

A recording of the piece by the London Sinfonietta is included in their 2006 CD Warp Works & Twentieth Century Masters.

== Second Construction ==
Second Construction was composed in 1940 and scored for four percussionists. This work, which adopts roughly the same rhythmic scheme as in First Construction (sixteen 16-bar sections, only the proportion is different—here it is 4, 3, 4, 5), is notable for the use of prepared piano: although the technique is that of string piano, the score instructs to place a piece of cardboard and a screw in the strings. The nature of the motive use is fugal, which caused Cage to become dissatisfied with the piece in his later years: in a 1980 interview he called it "[essentially] a fugue of a novel order" which has "carry-overs from education and theory" and expressed his dislike of repetition of material in fugues.

== Third Construction ==
Third Construction was composed in 1941 and dedicated to Xenia Kashevaroff-Cage, to whom Cage was married at the time and who played in his percussion orchestra. Third Construction is scored for four percussionists. There are 24 sections of 24 bars each, and the rhythmic structure is rotated between the players: 8, 2, 4, 5, 3, 2 for the fourth, 2, 8, 2, 4, 5, 3 for the first, etc.

Instrumentation:

- Player I: North West Indian rattle (wooden), 5 graduated tin cans, 3 graduated drums (tom toms), claves, large Chinese cymbal (suspended), maracas, teponaztli
- Player II: 3 graduated drums (tom toms), 5 graduated tin cans, claves, 2 cowbells, Indo-Chinese rattle (wooden, with many separate chambers), lion's roar
- Player III: 3 graduated drums (tom toms), tambourine, 5 graduated tin cans, quijadas, claves, cricket callers (split bamboo), conch shell
- Player IV: tin can with thumb tacks (rattle), 5 graduated tin cans, claves, maracas, 3 graduated drums (tom toms), wooden ratchet, bass drum roar
