= Stewart Television =

Defunct American television production company

- Formerly: Bob Stewart Productions (1964–1982, 1984–1987); Bob Stewart & Sande Stewart Productions (1982–1984, 1987–1991)
- Industry: Television
- Founded: 1964; 62 years ago
- Founder: Bob Stewart
- Defunct: 1994
- Fate: Sold to Sony
- Successor: Columbia TriStar Television
- Headquarters: Los Angeles, California, United States
- Key people: Bob Stewart; Sande Stewart; David Stewart
- Products: Game shows
- Divisions: Basada, Inc. Stewart Cable TV, Inc.
- Website: www.stewarttelevision.com

Stewart Television was an American game show production company formed by Bob Stewart in 1964 originally based in New York City.

== History ==
Stewart found a job and started creating game shows for Goodson-Todman Productions in 1956. One of the first game shows he created was The Price is Right aired on NBC and was hosted by Bill Cullen. The second game show Stewart created was To Tell the Truth the same year. The third was Password in 1961.

In 1964, Stewart left Goodson-Todman and formed his production company Bob Stewart Productions. A year later, the company entered into a partnership with Filmways Television, to develop television programming, the partnership ended in 1969, shortly before Filmways bought out West Coast rival game show producer Heatter-Quigley Productions.

His first production for his independent company was the game show Eye Guess that aired in 1966 and was co-produced by Filmways and lasted until 1969. It was followed by the game Personality that ran from 1967 to 1969.

In 1973, he created the successful Pyramid game show series starting with The $10,000 Pyramid with his son Sande Stewart who joined his father the same year and produced the series and also formed another production company Basada, Inc. on February 23, which was named after his sons: Barry, Sande, and David Stewart. As years went by, the series changed its name from The $10,000 Pyramid all the way to The $100,000 Pyramid.

In 1974, the company signed a deal with Viacom, where its first game show out of its syndicated deal was The $25,000 Pyramid, with host Bill Cullen, a longtime employee of the company.

=== New location ===
In 1978, Bob Stewart Productions was relocated to Los Angeles, California, with its first syndicated program at its new location, The Love Experts. Programs already on air in the meantime were still taped in New York, mainly The $20,000 Pyramid and Pass the Buck. In 1979, Bob Stewart had signed a deal with Metromedia Producers Corporation to launch new projects. In 1982, Stewart revived The $25,000 Pyramid, but to keep the name and the game show confused with Cullen's version, the format was renamed as The New $25,000 Pyramid with Dick Clark as host. The show was taped at CBS Television City in Hollywood, California. The same year, Bob and his son Sande created the unsold game show Twisters. It would be the first game show credited by Bob Stewart & Sande Stewart Productions (which would officially exist starting in 1987). Another game show was Go, that was based on the bonus round of Chain Reaction produced alongside his son, Sande one year later.

In early 1983, Bob Stewart Productions entered into a partnership with Dick Clark Productions (a production company owned by the host of Pyramid, Dick Clark) and Syndicast Services to develop a 90-minute game show block consisting of revivals of old Stewart properties Eye Guess, Three on a Match and Chain Reaction, and attempted to delay to 1984-1985, but none of which got into the ground. Also Stewart and Clark co-produced a television special You Are the Jury for NBC in late 1984, which was evolved into the syndicated court show Trial by Jury in 1989. In late 1984, Bob Stewart Productions partnered with 20th Century-Fox Television to do a syndicated version of The $25,000 Pyramid, called The $100,000 Pyramid, which aired for three years.

In 1985, Bob Stewart formed another production company called Bob Stewart Cable, Inc. for game show programs produced for cable. There were only two game shows produced under this banner, which were taped in two Canadian cities and produced for the USA Network. The first was Jackpot!, a revival of Stewart's 1974 series, which was taped in Toronto. The other was The New Chain Reaction, a revival of Stewart's short-lived 1980 series, which was taped in Montreal. By 1987, Bob Stewart was semi-retired, and his son Sande took over operations.

In 1988, the company partnered with British-American television producer/distributor Palladium Entertainment to distribute revivals of some old Stewart properties, such as Eye Guess and Jackpot!, but only the latter made it to air. In 1990, the company was renamed again as Stewart Television, while the cable production company was likewise renamed Stewart Cable TV, Inc.

A short time later, Sande Stewart formed Stewart Tele Enterprises and produced the revived The $100,000 Pyramid in 1991, which was hosted by John Davidson and was canceled in 1992 after its second season, the same year Bob Stewart fully retired.

=== Sale to Sony ===
In 1994, Bob Stewart sold his company to Sony Corporation. Sande, in the meantime, went ahead and created and produced more game shows with his own independent company Sande Stewart Television. A majority of Bob Stewart's game shows Sony owns has been aired on GSN. Two of Bob Stewart's game show formats have been revived into new incarnations. They were Pyramid and was hosted by Donny Osmond in 2002 for syndication and Chain Reaction in 2006 produced by British television producer Michael Davies' production company Embassy Row in association with and distributed by Sony Pictures Television aired on GSN and was hosted by Dylan Lane. Ironically, Embassy Row would be acquired by SPT on January 14, 2009.

Today, Stewart Television is an active in-name-only unit of Sony Pictures Television.

== Employees ==
Recently said was Bob Stewart's son Sande Stewart, who joined the company in 1973.

The most prolific announcers for Stewart were Don Pardo and Bob Clayton. Pardo was an announcer on most of the Stewart productions that originated from New York for NBC (examples are Eye Guess, Three on a Match, Winning Streak, and many others). Clayton was an alternative for Pardo, as he was the first announcer for Pyramid, and also announced for Blankety Blanks, Pass the Buck, and Shoot for the Stars.

Another longtime employee for Stewart Television was Jeopardy! game show announcer Johnny Gilbert, who would serve his announcement duties on the 1980 incarnation of Chain Reaction, The (New) $25,000 Pyramid, Double Talk, and both 1985 and 1991 incarnations of The $100,000 Pyramid. He was also an announcer at Barry & Enright Productions and Merv Griffin Enterprises. Charlie O'Donnell, Dean Goss, and Bob Hilton were also fill-ins for Pyramid eventually. The above mentions were also employees for Stewart.

Former Wheel of Fortune announcer Jack Clark also served his duties on The $10,000 Pyramid and The New $25,000 Pyramid until 1985. He was also an announcer for the short-lived game show/talk show The Love Experts, Eye Guess, The Face Is Familiar and the unsold game show pilot The Riddlers. He had also hosted pilots for Stewart, which failed to sell.

Dick Clark was another longtime employee, having hosted all except one Pyramid incarnation from 1973 to 1988. One of the other longtime employees was a close friend to Bob Stewart; Bill Cullen, who has hosted the syndicated version of The $25,000 Pyramid among other series: Pass the Buck, Blankety Blanks, Winning Streak, Eye Guess, Three on a Match, The Love Experts, and the 1980 version of Chain Reaction.

Anne-Marie Schmitt (who was also Stewart's partner until her death in 2006) was the producer of most of the Bob Stewart series. Another member of the production staff was Erin Perry, who is the daughter of game show host Jim Perry. Francine Bergman and David Michaels were associate producers of most of Bob Stewart's 1980s game shows. Directors included Mike Gargiulo and Bruce Burmester.

== Library ==
Sony Pictures Entertainment owns majority of the Bob Stewart Productions program and format library with certain exceptions. Pre-1978 master tapes of most of the series have been destroyed and completely wiped due to the network practices of the time. Many episodes from that era are preserved by home recorders and network/syndicated affiliate employees which surreptitiously either dubbed off, or retained bicycled copies, and exist mainly through tape trading and gray market uploads to video sites.

=== Created by Bob Stewart for Goodson-Todman ===
- The Price is Right (1956–1965) (Stewart producer)
- To Tell the Truth (1956–1968) (Stewart exec. producer 1956-1965)
- Password (1961–1967) (Stewart exec. producer 1961-1965)

=== Created by Bob Stewart for Stewart Television ===
Title	Years	Network	Notes
Eye Guess	1966–1969	NBC	co-production with Filmways
The Face Is Familiar	1966	CBS	co-production with Filmways
Personality	1967–1969	NBC	co-production with Filmways
You're Putting Me On	1969	NBC	co-production with Filmways
Three on a Match	1971–1974	NBC	
Pyramid	1973–1988; 1991	CBS; ABC; Syndication	co-production with Carolco Television Productions (1991) distributed by Viacom Enterprises (1974–1979), CPM, Inc. (1981), 20th Century Fox Television (1985–1988), Orbis Communications (1991 season 1), and Multimedia Entertainment (1991 season 2)
Jackpot	1974–1975; 1985–1990	NBC; USA Network/Global; Syndication	co-production with Sande Stewart and Reeves Entertainment Group (1989–1990), distributed by Palladium Entertainment (1989–1990)
Winning Streak	1974–1975	NBC	
Blankety Blanks	1975	ABC	
Shoot for the Stars	1977	NBC	
Pass the Buck	1978	CBS	
The Love Experts	1978–1979	Syndication	previously distributed by Viacom Enterprises
Chain Reaction	1980	NBC	
Go	1983–1984	NBC	co-production with Sande Stewart
Double Talk	1986	ABC	revival of Shoot for the Stars
The New Chain Reaction	1986–1991	Global/USA Network	co-production with Sande Stewart and Champlain Productions, Inc.
Trial by Jury	1989–1990	Syndication	co-production with Dick Clark Productions

==== Unsold pilots ====
- Celebrity Doubletalk (1967) (co-produced by Filmways)
- Second Guessers (1969)
- Says Who? (1971)
- Monday Night Quarterback (1971)
- The $10,000 Sweep (1972)
- Caught in the Act (1975)
- The Finish Line (1975)
- Get Rich Quick (1977)
- The Riddlers (1978)
- Mind Readers (1978) (Hosted by Geoff Edwards, and unrelated to the Goodson-Todman show of the same name)
- Caught in the Act (1979)
- Punch Lines (1979)
- Strictly Confidential (1980)
- Twisters (1982) (co-production with Sande Stewart)
- Second Guess (1982)
- Famous Last Words (1983) (co-production with Sande Stewart)
- Jackpot (1984) (Hosted by Nipsey Russell)
- $50,000 a Minute (1985)
- Money in the Blank (1987)
- Eye Q (1988)
- The Finish Line (1990)

== Past company names ==
- Bob Stewart Productions (original name of the production company)
- Bob Stewart Enterprises, Inc. (alternate name of the production company used for The Face is Familiar)
- Bob Stewart & Sande Stewart Productions (1982–1984 and 1987–1991)
- Bob Stewart Cable (for cable broadcast productions), renamed as Stewart Cable TV, Inc. in 1990
- Basada, Inc. (was used as the copyright production for the Pyramid incarnations, Go, Double Talk, and the Money in the Blank unsold pilot)
