= The Price Is Right (1956 American game show) =

American television series (1956–1965)

- Created by: Bob Stewart
- Directed by: Paul Alter; Max Miller
- Presented by: Bill Cullen
- Announcer: Don Pardo; Johnny Gilbert
- Country of origin: United States
- Original language: English
- No. of seasons: 9

Production
- Running time: 30 minutes
- Production company: Mark Goodson-Bill Todman Productions

Original release
- Network: NBC (1956–1963); ABC (1963–1965)
- Release: November 26, 1956 – September 3, 1965

Related
- The Price Is Right (1972 version)

The Price Is Right is an American game show produced by Mark Goodson-Bill Todman Productions, wherein contestants placed successive bids on merchandise prizes with the goal of bidding closest to each prize's actual retail price without surpassing it. The show was a precursor to the current and best-known version of the program, which premiered in 1972 on CBS's daytime schedule. It makes The Price Is Right one of only a few game show franchises to have aired in some form across all three of the Big Three television networks.

The series, hosted by Bill Cullen, premiered on NBC's daytime schedule on November 26, 1956, and quickly spawned a primetime series that aired once a week. The Price Is Right became one of the few game shows to survive the rigging scandals of the late 1950s, gaining even more popularity after other game shows had been canceled when exposed for being rigged.

The show was sponsored primarily throughout its run by Unilever, then known as Lever Brothers Corporation, and the specific products that were often featured were Imperial margarine, Wisk laundry detergent, Handy Andy liquid cleaner, and Dove bath and beauty bar.

The four contestants of the week would usually receive a complimentary supply of Dove beauty bars.

An alternate sponsor was Speidel watchbands, notably their new Twist-O-Flex bands.

In 1963, The Price Is Right switched networks and both the daytime and primetime series moved to ABC. On September 3, 1965, the show aired its final episode after nearly nine years on the air.

== Game play ==
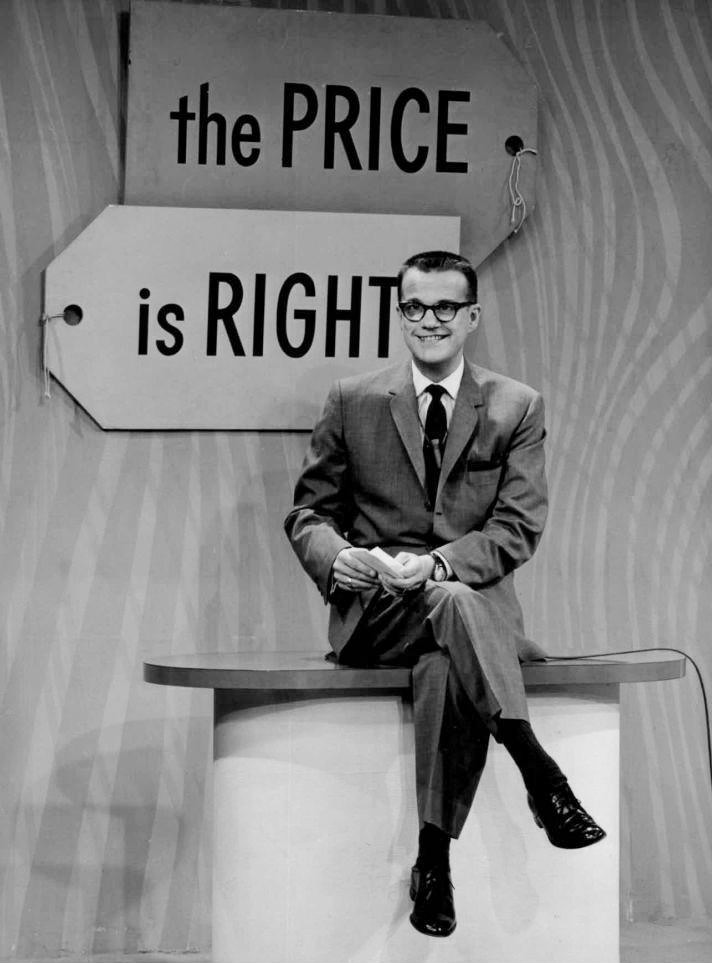
Bill Cullen as the show's host, 1963

On the original version of The Price Is Right, four contestants – one a returning champion, the other three chosen from the studio audience – bid on items or ensembles of items in an auction-style format.

A prize was presented for the contestants to bid on. A minimum bid was specified. After the opening bid, contestants bid on the item in turn with each successive bid a certain amount higher than the previous bid. A contestant could freeze their current bid instead of increasing it if they believed their bid was close enough to win. A later rule allowed contestants, on their opening bid only, to "underbid" the other bids, but it automatically froze their bid and prevented them from later increasing the original bid. Some rounds were designated as "one-bid" rounds, where only one round of bidding was held (the format used on the current version of The Price Is Right); sometimes the minimum-bid and higher-bid threshold rules also were waived.

Other than in one-bid rounds, the bidding continued until a buzzer sounded, at which point each contestant who had not yet "frozen" was given one final bid. Bidding also ended when three of the contestants had frozen, at which point the fourth contestant was allowed one final bid unless they already had the high bid. Cullen then read the actual retail price of the prize. The contestant whose bid was closest without going over the actual price won the item. If everyone overbid, the prize was not won; however, Cullen sometimes had the overbids erased and instructed players to give lower bids prior to reading the actual price (similar to what is done on the current CBS version and its syndicated spinoffs).

After most one-bid rounds, a bonus game was played, in which the winner of the one-bid prize would play a random game (such as wordplay or tune-matching) for additional prizes.

After a set number of rounds (four on the nighttime version, six on the daytime), the contestant who accumulated the highest value in cash and prizes became the champion and returned on the next show.

=== Home Viewer Showcases ===
The Price Is Right frequently featured a home viewer "Showcase", a multi-prize package for which home viewers were invited to submit their bids via postcard. The viewer who was closest to the actual retail price without going over won everything in the Showcase, but one item was sometimes handmade so the viewer could not check the price of all the items. The term "showcase" was later replaced by "sweepstakes".

Very often, home viewers were stunningly accurate with their bids, including several viewers who guessed the price correct down to the penny. In such a case, the tied contestants originally were informed via telegram and asked to give the price of a specific item and continuing until one broke the tie. Re-ties and all-overbids were thrown out. By the time of the ABC run, the tiebreaker changed so that the person who was first to send in the correct bid won the prize.

Home Viewer Showcases have also been featured on the CBS version, in 1972, 1978, annually from 1980 to 1987, 1990, and in 2011. Its format was unchanged through 1990, but the 2011 version, because of the advance in technology, changed to a ten-prizes-in-a-week format, with two prizes appearing per episode during the week. Each day the price of one of the prizes was revealed to the home audience, and the price of the second prize (which was in either of the two Showcases) was not provided. Instead of postcards, the bids had to be submitted through the show's website.

=== Prizes ===
While many of the prizes on the original Price Is Right were normal, standard game show fare (e.g., furniture, appliances, home electronics, furs, trips, and cars), there were many instances of outlandish prizes being offered. This was particularly true of the nighttime version, which had a larger prize budget.

Some examples:

- A 1926 Rolls-Royce with chauffeur
- A Ferris wheel
- An Amphicar
- Shares of corporate stock
- An island in the St. Lawrence Seaway
- A Piper Caribbean airplane
- A submarine

Sometimes, large amounts of food – such as a mile of hot dogs along with buns and enough condiments (perhaps to go with a barbecue pit) – were offered as the bonus.

Some other examples of outlandish or "exceptionally unique" bonus prizes:

- Accompanying a color TV, a live peacock (a play on the NBC logo) to serve as a "color guide"
- Accompanying a barbecue pit and the usual accessories, a live Angus steer
- Accompanying a prize package of items needed to throw a backyard party, big band legend Woody Herman and His Orchestra
- Accompanying a raccoon coat worth $29.95, a sable coat valued at $23,000
- A bonus prize of a 16'x32' in-ground swimming pool, installed in the winner's back yard in one day's time
- A bonus prize of a trip to Israel to appear as an extra in the 1960 film Exodus

In the early 1960s, the dynamic of the national economy was such that the nighttime show could offer homes in new subdivisions (sometimes fully furnished) as prizes, often with suspenseful bidding among the contestants.

In the last two seasons of the nighttime run, the series gave away small business franchises.

In some events, the outlandish prizes were merely for show; for instance, in one episode contestants bid on the original retail price for a 1920s car, but instead won a more contemporary model.

== History ==
The Price Is Right was created and produced by Bob Stewart for Mark Goodson–Bill Todman Productions. Stewart already had created one hit series for Goodson-Todman, To Tell the Truth and he later created the enormously successful Password. In 1964, Stewart left Goodson-Todman to strike out on his own as a producer. (Frank Wayne, who later served as executive producer for the Barker version of The Price Is Right, took over Stewart's Password producer duties.)

Bob Stewart attributes the creation of The Price Is Right to watching an auctioneer from his office window in New York City, auctioning off various merchandise items.

In 1959, shortly after the quiz show scandal broke, most game and quiz shows lost their popularity rapidly and were canceled. The Price Is Right was an exception; Goodson and Todman had built a squeaky-clean reputation upon relatively low-stakes games. Thus, as the more popular competition was eliminated, The Price Is Right became the most-watched game show in the country, and remained so for two years.

=== ABC ===
When the series moved to ABC in 1963, three studio contestants – including the returning champion – played. The fourth chair was filled by a celebrity who played for either a studio audience member or a home viewer. If the celebrity was the big winner of the show, the civilian contestant who had the most winnings was considered the champion; it is unknown what would have happened in the event of a shut-out with the celebrity winning.

As Don Pardo was still under contract at NBC, he was replaced by Johnny Gilbert. Coincidentally, both Pardo and Gilbert also had long runs as announcers for another game show, Jeopardy!

When the show moved to ABC, several CBS affiliates took up ABC secondary affiliation to show The Price Is Right (especially if its market lacked full ABC affiliation), in part because of the still-high ratings the show enjoyed in daytime.

Goodson-Todman wanted The Price Is Right to be ABC's first non-cartoon color show, but the network could not afford to convert to color. This meant that the nighttime version reverted to black-and-white.

=== Afterward ===
After the success of The Price Is Right, To Tell the Truth, and Password, producer Stewart left Goodson-Todman in 1964. Stewart's follow-up to The Price Is Right, his first independent production, was The Face Is Familiar with Jack Whitaker as host. Later, Stewart created other successful shows such as Eye Guess, a sight-and-memory game with Bill Cullen as host, Jackpot! and The $10,000, $20,000, $25,000 Pyramid.

In 1972, Goodson-Todman proposed a reformatted version of the game. In the new version of the game, the auction rounds were eliminated, with every round becoming a one-bid round. The bonus games were reformatted as pricing games, as most involve the pricing of either the prize itself, grocery items, or small prizes under $100. Each winning bidder was removed from the game and replaced with another contestant, all of whom were drawn from the studio audience. A new round, borrowing the Showcase name, brought back the two biggest winners to bid on their own three-prize package, with the top winner choosing to either bid or pass on the first showcase in hopes of a better deal on the second. The pricing games, contestants from the audience, and the bid-or-pass on prizes hidden behind doors were all previously used on another hit game show of the era, Let's Make a Deal, and Goodson-Todman's first choice of host for The New Price Is Right, Dennis James, was Let's Make a Deal's regular guest host at the time. James would end up hosting five weekly seasons of The New Price Is Right in first-run syndication; when CBS picked up the show for daytime, it insisted that the show be hosted by Bob Barker, who hosted 35 seasons of daily episodes (plus three seasons of weekly syndicated episodes after James's retirement and several prime-time specials) until his retirement in 2007, after which comedian Drew Carey assumed hosting duties. Further alterations to the format were made in 1975 when the show expanded to a "fabulous 60-minute" time slot. Various other versions of The Price Is Right have aired over the course of American television history, including a daily syndicated version hosted by Tom Kennedy in 1985 and a radically altered version hosted by Doug Davidson in 1994; the latter was notable for eliminating the central conceit from the original series of bidding on prizes. Counting all incarnations, The Price Is Right has aired for more hours than any other nationwide game show in American television history.

Paul Alter, who directed the original version of the show, became the director of the current version in 1986, replacing Marc Breslow, who had been in that role since its start in 1972; he continued to hold the position until 2000.

== Origin ==
The show originated from NBC's Hudson Theatre in New York City, also home to The Tonight Show and other NBC shows with a studio audience. A year later, after Abraham Hirschfeld bought the Hudson Theatre, the show moved to NBC's Colonial Theater at 66th and Broadway, with the Ziegfeld Theater used for a few shows as well. When the show moved to ABC, the Ritz Theater became the show's broadcast origination.

In addition to his hosting duties on The Price Is Right and his weekly appearances as a panelist on I've Got a Secret, Cullen also hosted a popular weekday morning radio show for WNBC in New York.

== Substitute hosts ==
Over the eight-year run, various people sat in Cullen's place while he was on vacation.

- Sonny Fox (June 10, 1957; first substitute host; he was also Bud Collyer's "designated" substitute host on Beat the Clock through 1960; it went off the air at the end of January, 1961)
- Sam Levenson (March 11, 1958– for 2 weeks)
- Merv Griffin (August 5 & 12, 1959 nighttime) – also filled in daytime during those two weeks
- Jack Narz (month of May, 1960; Bill's brother-in-law, later that year he began hosting Video Village; his brother Tom Kennedy later hosted a syndicated version of the 1972 The Price Is Right revival during the 1985–86 season.)
- Arlene Francis (January 25, 1961 – February 8, 1961 nighttime & January 25-February 12, 1961 daytime episodes)
- Bob Kennedy (May 1–12, 1961/June 22, 1961)
- Don Pardo (December 31, 1959/December 28, 1962)
- Robert Q. Lewis (February 1–12, 1960/December 27, 1963 {Cullen himself was the celebrity guest})
- Jack Clark (January 8–15, 1962/April 16-May 7, 1962/August 21-September 3, 1962/December 31, 1962-January 1, 1963/January 22-February 15, 1963/August 12–23, 1963/February 15-March 12, 1965, Dorothy Lamour was the celebrity guest)
- Johnny Gilbert (June 19, 1964; Ed Jordan filled in as announcer)

== Models ==
Throughout the nine-year run of The Price Is Right, the show also employed models, whose duties were similar to those of the models in the current version.

June Ferguson and Toni Wallace were the regular models, while Gail Sheldon also made frequent appearances. Ferguson, Wallace and Sheldon were featured during the show's entire nine-year run. Other models appearing included Beverly Bentley, Carol LaBrie, Carolyn Stroupe; various other models either assisted Ferguson and Wallace or appeared during their absences.

== Announcers ==
During the NBC run, Don Pardo was the main announcer. Whenever he was off or filling in for Cullen as host, substitute announcers included Dick Dudley, Vic Roby, Edward Haeffor, Roger Tuttle and Johnny Olson, who would go on to announce the 1972 version until his death in 1985.

Following the move to ABC (due to Don Pardo being under contract to NBC), Johnny Gilbert became the announcer; two fill-ins were Johnny Olson and ABC staff announcer Ed Jordan.

== Theme songs ==
The first theme song (used from 1956–1961) was an arrangement of Charles Strouse's "Sixth Finger Tune", originally written for Milton Scott Michel's 1956 play Sixth Finger in a Five Finger Glove.

The second theme song (used from 1961–1965) was called Window Shopping and was composed by Robert Cobert. This theme was later used on another Goodson-Todman game, Snap Judgment, and later found its way back to Bob Stewart's stable with the short-lived game You're Putting Me On.

== Episode status ==
Although The Price Is Right became Goodson-Todman's first regularly aired game show to be broadcast in color on September 23, 1957, no color kinescopes or videotapes are known to exist from the nighttime run except for approximately 90 seconds preceding the debut of the Kraft Music Hall on television, broadcast on October 8, 1958, taken from a quad-tape recording made off the broadcast feed and discovered in 2024, and since made available on YouTube by the UCLA Film & Television Archive.

Many monochrome NBC nighttime episodes (plus at least one ABC episode) aired on Game Show Network from 1996–2000, at which time the network's contract to air the show ended; it has not been renewed since. The 1961 episode hosted by Francis aired on Buzzr on March 8, 2019 as an homage to International Women's Day; Buzzr added the program to its weekend lineup in September 2019, with its package also including episodes hosted by Merv Griffin.

Most of the daytime run is believed to be wiped; the UCLA Film and Television Archive lists the first and third episodes from 1956 among its holdings. A few NBC daytime episodes with commercials intact, originally broadcast in the late spring/early summer of 1957, have been around the "collector's circuit." They are now available for viewing on YouTube.

=== Home media ===
Four episodes, including the 1964 nighttime finale, were released on "The Best of The Price is Right" DVD set (March 25, 2008). Despite pre-release assumptions that each of the four unique runs would be represented, as it was announced that there would be four Cullen episodes, none were of the ABC daytime run despite the existence of episodes from that era; a second NBC prime time episode instead filled that slot.

Many noticed that the four Cullen episodes lacked commercials, as well as the fact that all three NBC episodes had already been spotted prior to the DVD release. Both NBC primetime episodes (January 13 and 27, 1960) had aired on GSN before, while the daytime episode (February 21, 1957) had been available in the public domain for several years; the daytime episode is notable for not only missing its opening, but for Cullen promoting Charles Van Doren's match against Vivienne Nearing on Twenty-One – which eventually led to Van Doren's defeat.

The Fremantle logo animation was added after each episode, as the production company currently owns all Mark Goodson properties.

The episode listing included with the DVD set states the daytime episode aired March 10, 1957, and the ABC episode aired September 4, 1964 (with guest Jose Ferrer); however, the former actually aired on February 21, 1957, and the latter is not actually present on the DVD set but had been aired by GSN. The 1964 finale featured Pat Carroll as the celebrity player, and the night's champion was invited back to appear on the following Monday's daytime episode.

== In popular culture ==
The December 1959 issue of Mad Magazine spoofed the show—and in particular its sometimes-outlandish prizes—with the parody feature "The Price is All Right".

In a 1962 episode of The Flintstones, Barney Rubble is invited to be a contestant on The Prize is Priced, a parody of The Price is Right. When it's his turn to bid, Barney says, "I'll just put in my two cents, and—" but before he's able to give his actual bid, his supposed bid of two cents is locked in.

In 1984 single "I Lost on Jeopardy", "Weird Al" Yankovic comments in the lyrics that he hopes he will do better "next weekend on The Price Is Right".
