= Spring Rain (Bebu Silvetti song) =

""Lluvia de primavera" "Spring Rain""

Single by Bebu Silvetti
- B-side: "Travel Check" (original release) "Sortilegio" (1977 Spanish re-release)
- Released: 1975
- Recorded: 1975
- Genre: Easy Listening; Disco
- Length: 3:08 (Original Version) (Mix used for the album "World Without Words" and the original 1975 single release) 5:56 (Tom Moulton mix) (Mix used in the album "Spring Rain" and the 1976 Maxi-Single released by Salsoul Records) 2:58 (Short version of the Tom Moulton mix) (Mix used in the 1977 re-release of the single)
- Label: Hispavox (Spain)
- Composer: Bebu Silvetti

"Lluvia de primavera", released in America as "Spring Rain", is an instrumental composition by Bebu Silvetti.

== Chart performance ==
Two years after its release in 1975, the single spent fifteen weeks on the US Billboard Hot 100, debuting at number 96 the week of January 22, 1977 and peaking at number 39 the week of March 19, 1977. It eventually joined the list of 1970s one-hit wonders in the United States. In the US, on the National Disco Action Top 40 chart, "Spring Rain" went to #4. "Spring Rain" was also a hit on the Easy Listening chart, peaking at #13.

The single charted in South Africa in June 1977 at #4. The album version is longer than the original 1975 single version, which covered only the Hispavox A-side, with "Travel Check" on the B-side. In March 1977 Polydor Germany issued the album version split over 2 x 7" sides for discotheque use as "Spring Rain Part I / Part II".

== TV themes ==
- The tune was used as the opening theme for Penn State Football TV Highlight Show from 1977.
- The tune was used as the theme of the short-lived 1978-79 syndicated game/talk hybrid show The Love Experts (hosted by Bill Cullen at the time), and the unsold 1978 pilot of Mind Readers (hosted by Geoff Edwards at the time).
- The tune was used as the theme of the unsold 1980 pilot called Strictly Confidential(hosted by Dick Clark at the time).
- The tune was used as the theme of the unsold 1983 pilot called Famous Last Words...(hosted by Geoff Edwards at the time).
- The tune was used as the theme of the unsold 1984 pilot of Jackpot! (hosted by Nipsey Russell at the time).
- The Big Spin.

== Popular culture ==
- The single has been reissued on many compilations, such as Salsoul Jam 2000.

Many radio stations used this instrumental piece as well as its B-side Traffic Check as a station or program jingle, or as a filler.

== Samples ==
- "Spring Rain" has been sampled on songs including: Shangri-La (Denki Groove song), and Helter Stupid.
