= Doubletalk =

Doubletalk, double talk, or double-talk may refer to:

- Doublespeak, language that is deceptively ambiguous
- Gibberish (language game), a phonetically modified version of English
- Double-talk, speech including nonsense syllables that appears erudite

== Entertainment ==
- Double Talk, play by Nigel Williams (author)
- Double Talk (game show), a 1986 US game show
- "Double Talk" (The New Batman Adventures), a 1997 episode of The New Batman Adventures
