= Filmways =

Former American television and film production company

Filmways, Inc.
- Final logo, used from 1981 to 1982
- Type: Corporation
- Industry: Motion pictures Television programs
- Founded: 1952; 74 years ago
- Founder: Martin Ransohoff; Edwin Kasper
- Defunct: 1982; 44 years ago
- Fate: Acquired by Orion Pictures and renamed as Orion Pictures Corporation
- Successor: Orion Pictures Corporation
- Headquarters: Sonoma County, California, U.S.
- Key people: Martin Ransohoff; Edwin Kasper; Rodney Erickson

Filmways, Inc. (also known as Filmways Pictures and Filmways Television) was a television and film production company founded by American film executive Martin Ransohoff and Edwin Kasper in 1952. It is probably best remembered as the production company of CBS' "rural comedies" of the 1960s, including Mister Ed, The Beverly Hillbillies, Petticoat Junction, and Green Acres, as well as the comedy-drama The Trials of O'Brien, the western Dundee and the Culhane, the adventure show Bearcats!, the police drama Cagney & Lacey, and The Addams Family.

The company also briefly distributed SCTV in the United States and also distributed a syndicated half-hour edition of reruns of Saturday Night Live in the late 1970s. Notable films the company produced include The Sandpiper, The Cincinnati Kid, The Fearless Vampire Killers, Ice Station Zebra, Summer Lovers, The Burning, King, Brian De Palma's Dressed to Kill and Blow Out, as well as Death Wish II.

Filmways acquired several companies over the years, such as Heatter-Quigley Productions, Ruby-Spears Productions, and American International Pictures. It was also the owner of the film distributor Sigma III Corporation (Closely Watched Trains, Hi, Mom!), and Wally Heider Recording in Hollywood.

== History ==
Filmways was formed in 1952 by Martin Ransohoff and Edwin Kasper, who parted with Filmways five years later. The company originally produced television commercials and documentary films. In 1959, Filmways entered the television sitcom arena in a big way when many executives of McCadden Productions (a production company founded by comedian and actor George Burns) joined Filmways following McCadden's Chapter 7 bankruptcy earlier the same year. Filmways TV Productions was formed with former McCadden executive Al Simon as president, producing its first TV series, 21 Beacon Street. During that time, McCadden also produced the pilot which would later become the series Mister Ed. Burns sold the rights to Filmways, and Burns and director Arthur Lubin formed The Mister Ed Company as a joint venture. As a result, Mister Ed became a smash hit. From 1962 until 1971, Filmways produced its biggest hit, The Beverly Hillbillies for CBS, created by Paul Henning, another former McCadden executive.

In 1965, the company entered into a partnership with Bob Stewart Productions, to produce television game shows for Filmways, such as Eye Guess, The Face Is Familiar, Personality and You're Putting Me On. The partnership ended in 1969, shortly before Filmways bought out Heatter-Quigley Productions. In 1966, Filmways had started Filmways Syndication Sales, which ran in partnership with Firestone Film Syndication (headed by former Four Star Television executive Len Firestone) to syndicate television programs.

In 1967, the company had acquired small film distributor Sigma III Corporation, as well as its film library in an effort to expand onto motion picture production and distribution. In 1968, the company expanded and diversified into an entertainment company by purchasing Yorkshire Productions, producers of Kraft Music Hall, as well as Pic Mount Corp.. Wally Heider Studios, Lee Rothberg Productions, and other entertainment-oriented companies, and in 1969, the company acquired Heatter-Quigley Productions, the game show producer known for their biggest hit, Hollywood Squares. Also that year, the company bought Sears Point Raceway in Sonoma County, California, and Wally Heider's recording studios in Hollywood and San Francisco. Filmways was also listed as a co-developer of the Ontario Motor Speedway in San Bernardino County, California, which opened in 1970. In 1971, Filmways bought out National General Television Productions from National General Corporation. In 1972, Ransohoff left Filmways as president.

Filmways housed studios in Manhattan at 246 East 127th Street, which were built for Metro-Goldwyn-Mayer in the 1920s.

In 1974, it acquired book publisher Grosset & Dunlap from American Financial Group. In May 1975, it revived the television syndication firm Rhodes Productions after former parent Taft Broadcasting renamed the original company to Taft, H-B Program Sales two weeks earlier. In 1976, Richard L. Bloch became CEO. In 1977, it founded Ruby-Spears Productions with former Hanna-Barbera alumni Joe Ruby and Ken Spears. Later that year, Rhodes Productions was spun off into an independent corporation, and launched its syndication unit Filmways Enterprises, headed by Jamie Kellner. In 1978, the company signed a partnership with Moonlight Productions to produce television movies, the relationship was dissolved after Filmways turned into Orion. On July 12, 1979, after Samuel Z. Arkoff's retirement, Filmways purchased American International Pictures (AIP). Their TV subsidiary, AITV was eventually merged into Filmways Enterprises.

Filmways had lost nearly $20 million during the nine months ending in November 1981. However, it partially exited bankruptcy by selling a few of its previously acquired assets. In 1981, Ruby-Spears Productions was sold to Taft Broadcasting, owners of the Hanna-Barbera animation studio, the Heatter-Quigley game show studio and team split from Filmways and became Merrill Heatter Productions, and Sears Point Raceway was sold to Speedway Motorsports. In 1982, Grosset & Dunlap was sold to G. P. Putnam's Sons.

In February 1982, Filmways was acquired by Orion Pictures (with E. M. Warburg Pincus & Company and Home Box Office (HBO) for its pay and cable television rights). Filmways was then reincorporated as Orion Pictures Corporation on August 31, 1982.

== Production ==
=== Announcements at the end of productions ===
Most productions ended with an announcement, "This has been a Filmways presentation". For some shows, the voice-over was made by a cast member:

- Petticoat Junction: first, Billie Jo Bradley (Jeannine Riley) and later, Betty Jo Bradley (Linda Kaye Henning)
- Green Acres: Lisa Douglas (Eva Gabor), who says, "This has been a Filmways presentation, darling."
- The Beverly Hillbillies: Elly May Clampett (Donna Douglas). Following a few episodes, the voice of Jethro, Max Baer Jr., can be heard saying, "Aww, shuddup, Elly May", following her announcement. Seasons 1–3, however, feature Bill Baldwin, the announcer for the show's sponsors.
- Mister Ed: Roger Addison (Larry Keating). Later seasons feature Mister Ed (Allan Lane) saying it after Keating's death in 1963.
- The Addams Family: The logo was silent, but in some episodes the phrase was recited in a deep baritone voice by Ted Cassidy, although he did not use his usual "Lurch" voice. A few other times, Carolyn Jones recited the phrase and added "darling" at the end.

== Filmways' library ==
Today, most of the Filmways library, including Green Acres, The Addams Family, Cagney & Lacey, Blow Out (both continued by Orion), Death Wish II (a Cannon film), The Hollywood Squares, and Mister Ed is now owned by Amazon MGM Studios (via Metro-Goldwyn-Mayer Television).

The Beverly Hillbillies and Petticoat Junction are owned by Skydance Corporation (via CBS Media Ventures). Viacom (the parent of CBS from 1999 to 2005, actually started as CBS' syndication arm) syndicated these two programs since the 1970s. In the case of Hillbillies, Amazon MGM Studios (via Metro-Goldwyn-Mayer Television) still owns the copyrights to the episodes, excluding episodes from the first season and the first half of the second season, which have fallen into the public domain. However, any new compilation of Hillbillies material will be copyrighted by either MPI Media Group or CBS, depending on the series content.

Filmways co-produced Eye Guess, The Face Is Familiar, Personality, and You're Putting Me On with Bob Stewart Productions. Those four game shows are currently owned by Sony Pictures Television (SPT). Filmways syndicated Mary Hartman, Mary Hartman that was produced by T.A.T. Communications Company. That too is owned by SPT (via ELP Communications). SPT co-distributed the MGM library for a short time.

The rights to nearly all movies Filmways co-produced with major studios have been retained by the studios that originally released them; 10 Rillington Place is owned by Columbia Pictures, Save the Tiger is owned by Paramount Pictures, Two-Minute Warning is owned by Universal Studios, and so forth. Most of the foreign-language films released by their Sigma III division have reverted to their original producers, but a small number of English-language films Sigma III handled such as Cul-de-sac and Hi, Mom! were retained by Filmways and are now owned by Amazon MGM Studios (via Orion Pictures). The rest that were originally released by MGM prior to May 23, 1986 are currently also owned by Skydance (via Warner Bros. and Turner Entertainment Co.).

== Filmography ==
=== Television series ===
Title	Years	Network	Notes
21 Beacon Street	1959	NBC	
Mister Ed	1961–66	Syndication/CBS	
The Beverly Hillbillies	1962–71	CBS	co-production with CBS Productions
Petticoat Junction	1963–70	CBS	co-production with CBS Productions
The Addams Family	1964–66	ABC	
Green Acres	1965–71	CBS	
The Trials of O'Brien	1965–66	CBS	
Eye Guess	1966–69	NBC	co-production with Bob Stewart Productions
The Hollywood Squares	1966–81	NBC	co-production with Heatter-Quigley Productions
The Double Life of Henry Phyfe	1966	ABC	
The Face Is Familiar	1966	CBS	co-production with Bob Stewart Productions
The Pruitts of Southampton	1966–67	ABC	
Personality	1967–69	NBC	co-production with Bob Stewart Productions
Dundee and the Culhane	1967	CBS	
The Debbie Reynolds Show	1969–70	NBC	
Bearcats!	1971	CBS	
Ozzie's Girls	1973–1974	Syndication	
Mary Hartman, Mary Hartman	1976–1977	Syndication	produced by T.A.T. Communications Company. T.A.T. took over syndication during season 2
Big Hawaii	1977	NBC	
King	1978	NBC	
240-Robert	1979–81	ABC	
Thundarr the Barbarian	1980–82	ABC (1980–82)/NBC (1983)	co-production with Ruby-Spears
Cagney & Lacey	1982–88	CBS	continued by Orion Television

=== Feature films ===
Release date	Title	Notes
June 21, 1962	Boys' Night Out	distributed by Metro-Goldwyn-Mayer
November 14, 1963	The Wheeler Dealers	distributed by Metro-Goldwyn-Mayer
September 17, 1964	Topkapi	distributed by United Artists
October 27, 1964	The Americanization of Emily	distributed by Metro-Goldwyn-Mayer
June 23, 1965	The Sandpiper	distributed by Metro-Goldwyn-Mayer
October 11, 1965	The Loved One	distributed by Metro-Goldwyn-Mayer
October 15, 1965	The Cincinnati Kid	distributed by Metro-Goldwyn-Mayer
1967	Too Many Thieves	distributed by Metro-Goldwyn-Mayer
June 20, 1967	Don't Make Waves	distributed by Metro-Goldwyn-Mayer
November 13, 1967	The Fearless Vampire Killers	distributed by Metro-Goldwyn-Mayer
December 6, 1967	Eye of the Devil	distributed by Metro-Goldwyn-Mayer
October 23, 1968	Ice Station Zebra	distributed by Metro-Goldwyn-Mayer
November 17, 1968	Journey to Jerusalem	distributed by Sigma III
February 9, 1969	A Midsummer Night's Dream	television film
July 23, 1969	Castle Keep	distributed by Columbia Pictures
December 21, 1969	Hamlet	distributed by Columbia Pictures
April 27, 1970	Hi, Mom!	distributed by Sigma III; Produced by West End Films
July 1970	The Moonshine War	distributed by Metro-Goldwyn-Mayer
May 12, 1971	10 Rillington Place	distributed by Columbia Pictures
June 30, 1971	What's the Matter with Helen?	distributed by United Artists
September 2, 1971	See No Evil	distributed by Columbia Pictures
November 22, 1971	King Lear	distributed by Altura Films
July 14, 1972	Fuzz	distributed by United Artists
February 14, 1973	Save the Tiger	distributed by Paramount Pictures
July 21, 1974	The White Dawn	distributed by Paramount Pictures
November 14, 1975	The Other Side of the Mountain	distributed by Universal Pictures
November 7, 1976	21 Hours at Munich	television film
November 12, 1976	Two-Minute Warning	distributed by Universal Pictures
February 10, 1978	The Other Side of the Mountain Part 2	distributed by Universal Pictures
July 11, 1980	How to Beat the High Cost of Living	
July 24, 1980	The Earthling	
July 25, 1980	Dressed to Kill	
September 26, 1980	Without Warning	North American distribution only
October 3, 1980	The First Deadly Sin	
November 28, 1980	The Babysitter	television film
December 12, 1980	Tell Me a Riddle	North American theatrical distribution only; produced by Godmother Productions
January 1981	Underground Aces	
March 1, 1981	Miracle on Ice	television film
May 8, 1981	The Burning	North American distribution only; produced by Miramax Films
July 24, 1981	Blow Out	
August 28, 1981	Comin' at Ya!	North American theatrical distribution only
October 9, 1981	Full Moon High	
October 11, 1981	Priest of Love	U.S. theatrical distribution only
December 11, 1981	Four Friends	
February 19, 1982	Death Wish II	North American distribution excluding television only; produced by Golan-Globus Productions
May 7, 1982	Urgh! A Music War	U.S. theatrical distribution only; produced by Lorimar
July 16, 1982	Summer Lovers	
