= Blankety Blanks =

Blankety Blanks or Blankety Blank may refer to:

- Blankety Blanks (U.S. game show), hosted by Bill Cullen in 1975
- Game shows based upon the U.S. show Match Game:
  - Blankety Blanks (Australian game show), which aired from 1977 to 1978 and was hosted by Graham Kennedy
  - Blankety Blank, a British version which aired between 1979 and 2002 and was revived in 2021
