= Pass the Buck (American game show) =

- Genre: Game show
- Created by: Bob Stewart
- Directed by: Mike Gargiulo
- Presented by: Bill Cullen
- Announcer: Bob Clayton
- Music by: Frank Talley
- Country of origin: United States
- No. of episodes: 62

Production
- Executive producer: Bob Stewart
- Producer: Sande Stewart
- Production locations: Ed Sullivan Theater, New York City
- Running time: 30 minutes
- Production company: Bob Stewart Productions

Original release
- Network: CBS
- Release: April 3 – June 30, 1978

Pass the Buck is a game show that aired on CBS television's daytime lineup from April 3 to June 30, 1978. The series was hosted by Bill Cullen and was created by Bob Stewart. Bob Clayton was the announcer.

== Gameplay ==
Four contestants competed to give a list of items that fit into a specific category announced at the beginning of each round (e.g., first names with exactly four letters, things that are inflated). The bank for each game started at $100. Each contestant gave one answer at a time, proceeding left to right from the audience's perspective, and $25 was added to the bank for each valid answer.

If a contestant repeated a previous response, failed to respond within the allotted time, or gave a response that the judges deemed invalid, the next contestant in line could eliminate him/her by giving an acceptable answer. If consecutive contestants missed, an acceptable response by the next contestant in line eliminated all of them. However, if all the contestants gave invalid responses, the category was removed and a new one was announced to begin the next round. A new category was also given whenever one or more contestants were eliminated.

The game ended once three of the contestants were eliminated. The last one standing won the bank and played the Fast Bucks round.

=== Fast Bucks ===
In Fast Bucks, the surviving contestant faced a game board with four rows, with one box on the top row and each row below it containing one more box. Starting on the bottom and working up, a specific category was given (e.g., reference books, U.S. states) and the contestant had 15 seconds to give as many answers as possible that fit it. The object was to match the answers hidden behind the boxes on any single row. The three eliminated contestants stayed onstage to observe the round, as the winner's performance dictated whether or not they could continue playing.

As long as the winning contestant matched at least one answer on a row, he/she advanced to the next one and was given a new category. If he/she failed to match any answers, the round ended and he/she received $100 for every revealed answer. All four contestants then began a new game.

To earn the championship, the contestant had to either match all of the answers on any one row or match at least one answer on each of the four rows. He/she won $5,000, and the other three contestants were eliminated from the show, keeping whatever money they had won. Contestants remained on the show until being eliminated by an opponent's Fast Bucks win, or until they reached the $25,000 winnings limit that was in force for CBS game shows at the time. No one was able to reach the limit during its 62-episode run. The biggest winner was Linda Credit with $20,275.

== Broadcast history ==
Pass the Buck aired on CBS at 10:00 AM (9:00 Central), initially for the first three weeks facing reruns of Sanford and Son on NBC, then Card Sharks. Following its last episode which aired June 30, 1978, the program was replaced by Tic-Tac-Dough. The last episode also went unfinished, ending with two of the four contestants eliminated and $575 in the bank.

=== Taping location ===
The show videotaped during its brief run at the Ed Sullivan Theater in New York City, now the home of The Late Show. To date, Pass the Buck is the last game show to tape there.
