= Hit the Jackpot =

American radio quiz series (1948–1950)

Hit the Jackpot is an American radio quiz program that was broadcast on CBS from May 9, 1948, through December 27, 1949, and from May 28, 1950, through September 3, 1950. It was originally titled Try 'n' Stop Me and then called Catch Me If You Can before Hit the Jackpot took effect on June 13, 1948.

== Format ==
Hit the Jackpot offered opportunities to win to listeners as well as to contestants in the studio. Contestants in the studio were paired, one as climber and the other as challenger. Climbers who answered four questions correctly tried to guess the jackpot's "secret sentence" — a well-known phrase presented via dramatic vignettes and sound effects. However, the challenger could replace the climber by catching him or her in an incorrect answer. The climber's status was represented on stage by a scoreboard in the form of a large red ladder with four rungs. Each correct answer lighted one rung. When a contestant failed to identify the jackpot phrase, the host called a listener whose postcard had been selected and gave that person a chance to answer the jackpot question.

The host was Bill Cullen. The announcers were George Bryan and Richard Stark. Music was provided by the Ray Charles Singers and Al Goodman's orchestra. Mark Goodson and Bill Todman were the producers.

Merchandise in jackpots typically included a DeSoto car, furniture, and trips. Values of the merchandise in jackpots often exceeded $25,000, with the largest jackpot by June 1949 being $32,600. Two examples:of jackpots were one valued at $24,000 that included a $4,800 boat and another valued at $27,000 that included $1000 worth of books.

== Schedule ==
The 30-minute program was initially broadcast on Sundays at 9 p.m. Eastern Time. Beginning June 29, 1948, it was moved to Tuesdays at 9:30 p.m. E. T., and after June 13, 1949, it was moved to Tuesdays at 10 p.m. E. T. It was replaced by Groucho Marx's comedy quiz. When the show returned in May 1950 (as a summer replacement for Amos 'n' Andy), it was heard on Sundays at 7:30 p.m. E. T.

== Sponsor ==
Hit the Jackpot initially was sustaining, and executives at CBS had little hope of its becoming a commercial success. That outlook changed when an episode included a DeSoto automobile as part of the jackpot. "DeSoto executives tuned in to the show just to hear the 'free' mention of their product and got so excited at the studio audience's reaction when the car was mentioned that they quickly decided to sponsor the whole show." In June 1948, DeSoto canceled The Adventures of Christopher Wells because its ratings were low and bought Catch Me If You Can to replace the Wells show. The trade publication Billboard called the transaction "one of the quickest sales of a web package"

== Critical response ==
Bob Cronin, writing in the Vermont Sunday News, complimented Cullen's work on the program, saying, "Cullen's drive and instinctive showmanship is so good that you might not even notice it. He can say more things faster and better, with rarely a slip-up, than any announcer on the air, and his sense of humor is so keen that he is there with a clever rejoinder in any situation."

== Legal case ==
In the summer of 1950, Russell and Shirley Nihlean (a married couple from Chicago) sued CBS, DeSoto, and Plymouth for $150,000 in Chicago's Federal District Court on a charge of misappropriation of dramatic property. The Nihleans alleged that Hit the Jackpot was based on their idea for a program called Watch Your Step. They said that they wrote the latter show and submitted it to WBBM, the CBS affiliate in Chicago. They also said that WBBM broadcast a show similar to Watch Your Step and that it eventually was moved to New York, becoming Hit the Jackpot. Executives at CBS and WBBM said that they could find no record of the Nihleans' submission of a show. In addition to misappropriation, the complaint included charges of unfair trade practices and unfair competition. The two sides settled out of court in October 1950, and Federal District Court Judge Philip Sullivan dismissed the case "with prejudice", preventing it from being taken to court again.
