= The Face Is Familiar =

- Title screenshot
- Genre: Game show
- Created by: Bob Stewart
- Presented by: Jack Whitaker
- Announcer: Jack Clark
- Country of origin: United States
- Original language: English
- No. of seasons: 1
- No. of episodes: 18

Production
- Producer: Bob Stewart
- Running time: 24-25 min
- Production company: Bob Stewart Productions Filmways Television

Original release
- Network: CBS
- Release: May 7 – September 3, 1966

The Face Is Familiar is an American game show which aired in color on CBS as a summer replacement show from May 7 to September 3, 1966. The show was hosted by Jack Whitaker and featured celebrity guests including Bob Crane, Dick Van Patten, Mel Brooks and June Lockhart.

The series was primarily sponsored by Philip Morris' Parliament and Marlboro cigarettes, and their American Safety Razor Company (Personna razor blades) and Clark Gum subsidiaries. The show was produced by Bob Stewart Productions in association with Filmways Television. Its theme song was a slightly-modified version of Brasilia, performed by Herb Alpert & the Tijuana Brass.

== Game play ==
Each game featured two contestants, each partnered with a celebrity guest. The celebrities each stayed on for the entire program while contestants played only one game, win or lose.

Each round centered around a board which contained the face of a celebrity, cut into seven horizontal strips and jumbled vertically. At the beginning of each round, only one strip was revealed. Then, alternating between the celebrities and the contestants, the pairs were asked trivia questions in the form of an incomplete sentence (for example, "The last king of France was...").

After each question, more of the face was revealed (still in jumbled order). The first two questions revealed one part each, while the next two revealed two parts each. The player who correctly answered the question had the opportunity to guess the identity of the celebrity after the new parts were revealed. An incorrect answer gave the opponent the right to guess.

If the identity was not guessed after all seven parts were revealed, play continued with each question offering a chance to swap the positions of two parts. Incorrect answers moved on to the next question and did not give the opponent control. The player who answered correctly chose one part of the face and their partner chose another part; the two were then swapped. The first partner could then guess the answer.

The team which correctly identified the celebrity won $150 for the contestant.

=== "Three of a Kind" Bonus Game ===
In the bonus game, one partner was asked to find the eyes of a given celebrity, and three strips containing eyes were shown very briefly, one at a time. If the player could choose the correct eyes, they added $50 to the contestant's winnings.

This was repeated for three mouths and noses, with the partners alternating. The second correct answer added another $50, and the third correct answer earned another $250 for a total of $500.

== Changes ==
By June 25, the format had changed so that the teams would alternate picking numbers from 1 to 7 to reveal a strip of a celebrity's scrambled face for their opponents until either the entire picture was revealed or one team correctly guessed the face. If the entire picture was revealed, the teams would then begin switching two strips of the face around to try to figure out who was in the picture. Each correct answer was worth $100, and two games won the match.

The bonus round was also changed so that the team could always see either the eyes, nose, or mouth and had to guess which celebrity that body part belonged to. However, there was now a 60-second time limit. $50 was awarded for each correct guess, with $500 awarded if all four were correctly guessed. If a celebrity was not guessed within 10 seconds of the body part being shown, the full face was revealed, and play continued with another body part. Both teams competed for the entire show.

== Pilot ==
The pilot was filmed early in 1966 with Jack Clark as host; Betsy Palmer and Bill Cullen were the celebrities. As Clark closed the episode, he mentioned that the "following week's guests" would be Eydie Gorme and Alan King, implying that a second pilot would be filmed. Clark became the show's announcer after it was sold to CBS—Hal Simms was announcer on the pilot and Winston cigarettes was going to be the sponsor for it.

The set and format were slightly different; winning the main game was worth $200 instead of $150. Also, winning the end game was worth $500 in addition to the $200 from the main game, instead of a $500 total.

== Technology ==
The series was notable for its use of technology. Besides the screen which showed the faces and could switch any two pieces instantly, the show also used a split-screen shot when the contestants (who sat outside of the two celebrities) were answering a question. When one contestant rang in, the split wiped to the side to show both partners of that team.

The second format's bonus round used a 60-second timer. For the viewers, a 7x4 electronic lighted scoreboard was superimposed on the bottom of the screen.

== Episode status ==
The series is believed to have been destroyed due to network practices of the era. Only four episodes are known to exist - the pilot, the premiere with Lockhart and Crane, the June 25 episode with Florence Henderson and Ray Milland, and the July 16 episode with Pearl Bailey and Mel Brooks. Of these, only the June 25 and July 16 episodes are in color, with the latter being rerun by GSN several times.

The premiere has since appeared on the Internet Archive.
