= Winning Streak (American game show) =

- Genre: Game show
- Created by: Bob Stewart
- Directed by: Mike Gargiulo
- Presented by: Bill Cullen
- Announcer: Don Pardo
- Country of origin: United States
- No. of episodes: 128

Production
- Producer: Bruce Burmester
- Production location: NBC Studios, Rockefeller Center
- Running time: 30 Minutes

Original release
- Network: NBC
- Release: July 1, 1974 – January 3, 1975

Winning Streak is an American television game show hosted by Bill Cullen and announced by Don Pardo. It aired weekdays on NBC from July 1, 1974 to January 3, 1975 and was produced at the NBC Studios in New York's Rockefeller Plaza.

== Gameplay ==
A typical main-game board from the original format. Winning words for this category include TOAST, EGGS, and CEREAL.

Under the original format, each match consisted of two complete games whose winners faced each other to determine the overall championship.

=== Part One ===
Two contestants, a challenger and the current champion, raced to spell a word that fit into a given category. The contestants were shown a grid that displayed 16 letters and the category for that game.

The challenger chose a letter to start the game, and the host asked a toss-up question whose answer began with that letter. The first contestant to buzz-in got a chance to answer; a correct response awarded control of the letter, while a miss gave it to the opponent. The contestant with control of the letter could either place it in one of seven slots on a display in front of them or discard it. Regardless of their decision, that contestant chose the next letter. The game continued in this fashion until one contestant won by spelling a word that fit the given category. All 16 letters remained available throughout the game and could be claimed or passed multiple times.

==== Money Board ====
The winner faced the Money Board, which consisted of 18 squares numbered 1–18 and laid out around the edges of the display grid. The six squares on the top row hid money amounts from $100–$200 while the other 12, down both sides and on the bottom, hid letters.

The contestant selected one of the six money squares, whose amount was revealed, and then selected a letter square. They had five seconds to give an acceptable word containing that letter, and won the revealed amount for doing so. After every turn, the contestant could either end the round and keep all their winnings, or try to double the total by selecting another letter square and giving a word that contained all letters revealed to that point in any order. The round continued until the contestant either chose to stop, failed to give an acceptable word (which forfeited all the money), or had doubled the initial value 11 times by successfully forming a word with all 12 letters on the board. The same word could not be used twice in a round.

A sample Money Board round might proceed as follows:

- Contestant reveals a $150 square
- Contestant reveals G; says GO and wins $150
- Contestant continues; reveals M; says MUG (using G, M) and wins $300
- Contestant continues; reveals U; says GUM (using G, M, U) and wins $600
- Contestant continues; reveals N; says JUMPING (using G, M, U, N) and wins $1,200
- Contestant stops and keeps the $1,200

The maximum potential winnings total from a single playing of the Money Board was $409,600, obtainable by uncovering a $200 square and doubling it 11 times.

==== Changes ====
At some point, instead of spelling out a word from a given category, players were simply awarded points toward a target total for answering the toss-up questions, with the winner then advancing to the Money Board.

=== Part Two ===
A second game and Money Board round were played with two new contestants and under the same rules as Part One, while the winner of the first game watched from a podium at the side of the stage. The contestant sitting in the challenger's position chose the first letter.

If one winner lost while playing the Money Board, the other was automatically declared the champion for that match and kept their winnings. If they had both won money, they faced each other in the Final Showdown. If both winners had lost, they faced each other in Part One of a new match.

=== Final Showdown ===
The Money Board was used for this round, with the six money squares blacked out and letters hidden behind the other 12. The top winner decided who would play first, and the contestants alternated turns revealing a letter and forming a word containing all letters revealed to that point. As soon as one contestant failed to give an acceptable word, the opponent won the championship and all the money accumulated by both of them in their respective games.

The maximum potential winnings total for a single match was $819,200, obtainable if both winners had reached the $409,600 total as described above.

==== Changes ====
Near the end of the run, this round was retitled the "Sudden-Death Showdown" and played under slightly different rules. The six money squares were added back onto the Money Board, and the high scorer chose one of them while their opponent selected the first letter. Every acceptable word formed during this round added the chosen amount to a pot; when one contestant failed to give such a word, the opponent won the pot and the championship.

== Broadcast history ==
Winning Streak replaced Stewart and Cullen's Three on a Match, swapping time slots with Jeopardy!. NBC placed Winning Streak at 10:30 AM (9:30 Central) against CBS' strong Gambit. However, Winning Streak made no impact against its competition and ended after six months along with Jeopardy!. Wheel of Fortune replaced Winning Streak on NBC's schedule on January 6, 1975.

=== Episode status ===
The entire series is believed to have been wiped, as per network practices of that era.

In the 1990s, Game Show Network aired a single episode of Winning Streak on two occasions: as a standalone broadcast, and in mid-1998 as a subject of original series Faux Pause. The latter appearance notably included a freeze-frame shot of the production slate, which lists the air date of August 9, 1974. This was the day that President Richard Nixon resigned, and The Bill Cullen Archive has speculated that the episode was originally pre-empted for news coverage, and ended up in a different stack of tapes that survived when the others were destroyed.

The premiere from July 1, 1974 exists in audio format, as well as an episode from November 5, the latter featuring the different gameplay for the letter grid round. Archival Television Audio also has 5 audio episodes available. The first three and a half minutes of the December 26, 1974 episode also exist as video, covering a Sudden-Death Showdown as described above.

== Theme music ==
The show's theme song was "Saturday About Town" by Barry Stoller, from the 1971 De Wolfe Music library album Atomic Butterfly by Meatball (De Wolfe).
