= Go (game show) =

- Genre: Game show
- Created by: Bob Stewart
- Based on: Chain Reaction bonus round (1980, 2006–07)
- Directed by: Bruce Burmester
- Presented by: Kevin O'Connell
- Announcer: Johnny Gilbert
- Theme music composer: Bob Cobert
- Country of origin: United States
- No. of episodes: 79

Production
- Executive producer: Bob Stewart
- Producer: Sande Stewart
- Production locations: NBC Studios; Burbank, California
- Running time: approx. 24 minutes
- Production company: Bob Stewart-Sande Stewart Productions

Original release
- Network: NBC
- Release: October 3, 1983 – January 20, 1984

Related
- Chain Reaction

Go is an American television game show created by Bob Stewart and aired on NBC from October 3, 1983, to January 20, 1984. The show featured two teams; each composed of four contestants and a celebrity. The teams had to construct questions one word at a time to convey a word or phrase to their teammates. The concept of Go was based on "Instant Reaction", an endgame played on two different iterations of another game show created by Bob Stewart, Chain Reaction, in 1980 on NBC and from 2006–07 on GSN.

Kevin O'Connell was the show's host, and Johnny Gilbert was the announcer, with Jack Clark substituting for him during November 1983.

== Main game ==
Two teams, each consisting of one celebrity captain and four contestants, competed. Each team selected one member to guess words/phrases based on clues given by the other four; this member kept his/her role throughout the entire game.

The team that played first in any round blindly selected one of two packets of words/phrases, and the four clue-givers sat in a line. The first two constructed a clue question by alternately giving one word at a time, and rang a bell to indicate when they had finished. If the guesser answered correctly, he/she moved on to hear a new clue from the middle two givers, then the last two; upon reaching the end of the line, he/she began moving back up toward its start. If the guesser answered incorrectly, or if the givers constructed an illegal question, accidentally said the answer, or passed, the guesser could not advance and a new word was played. The team's turn ended after 99 seconds or five correct answers, whichever came first, and the opposing team then played the unused packet in an attempt to win the round by outscoring them or beating their time.

A maximum of four rounds were played, with the teams alternating first-play honors from one round to the next. The winner of each round scored points: 250 in round one, 500 in round two, 750 in round three, 1,250 in round four (if needed). The first team to reach 1,500 points won the game, received their entire score in cash, and moved on to the Jackpot Round for a chance at up to $10,000. The runner-up team received consolation prizes.

== Jackpot Round ==
The guesser of the winning team was given 60 seconds to identify seven subjects based on clue questions constructed by the others as in the main game. All four clue-givers participated in the first subject, but one of them had to drop out after each correct answer until only one clue-giver was playing the fourth subject. Once this subject was guessed correctly, the clue-givers returned one at a time in reverse order until they were all playing the seventh subject. The subject is removed if the guesser guesses wrong, the clue givers pass on the subject, or construct an illegal question.

The team won $10,000 for guessing seven subjects, or $200 per correct guess if time ran out. Any winning team that won the first three rounds in the main game played the round twice, for a potential jackpot of $20,000.

== Champions ==
Originally one of the two teams consisted of one new team and a returning champion. The champions could return until they were defeated or won five times. After the first four weeks, the format changed and both teams competed for the entire week, rotating celebrity captains each day.

From November 7 to 11, 1983, and again from November 28 to December 3, 1983, Go! had an all-star "Battle of the Daytime Soaps". The first week pitted the cast of Days of Our Lives against the cast of Another World, while the second saw Another World returning to take on the cast of Search for Tomorrow, with all winnings going to charity. It was during these two weeks that Jack Clark filled in as announcer for Johnny Gilbert.

== Broadcast History ==
Go aired at 12:00 noon ET/11:00 AM CT/MT/PT on NBC, long a problem time slot for the three major broadcast networks at the time, as their local affiliates would often preempt network programming to air newscasts or syndicated fare. The noon slot was also home to Family Feud, which was the top-rated daytime game show carried on ABC, and in some markets CBS aired the first half of The Young and the Restless.

Since the cancellation of Password Plus, which had aired in the noon hour for most of its run, in 1982, NBC had tried three different first-run programs in the noon slot. The first was their longtime serial The Doctors, which had seen a massive ratings collapse that would eventually result in its cancellation at the end of 1982. NBC then tried two game shows in the slot; the first, Just Men!, premiered on January 3, 1983, but was cancelled after thirteen weeks, and the second, The New Battlestars, launched on April 4 and met the exact same fate. Go managed a total of sixteen weeks before it too was cancelled.

== Episode status ==
The series was rebroadcast on CBN and Game Show Network at various times.

== International versions ==
| Country | Name | Host | Network | Premiere | Finale |
|---|---|---|---|---|---|
| United Kingdom | Get Set Go | Michael Barrymore | BBC1 | September 10, 1984 | November 26, 1984 |
