= Jackpot (game show) =

American game show

- Genre: Game show
- Created by: Bob Stewart
- Directed by: Mike Gargiulo; William G. Elliott; Bruce Burmester
- Presented by: Geoff Edwards; Mike Darow
- Announcer: Don Pardo; Wayne Howell; Ken Ryan; John Harris; John Harlan; Johnny Gilbert
- Music by: Bob Cobert (1985–1990)
- Countries of origin: United States (1974–1975, 1989–1990); Canada (1985–1988)
- No. of seasons: 3 (1985–1988 version)
- No. of episodes: 450 (1974–1975 version); 525 (1985–1988 version); 130 (1989–1990 version)

Production
- Production locations: NBC Studios; New York, New York (1974–1975); Global Television; Toronto, Ontario, Canada (1985–1988); Glendale, California (1989–1990)
- Production company: Bob Stewart Productions

Original release
- Network: NBC
- Release: January 7, 1974 – September 26, 1975
- Network: Global; USA Network
- Release: September 30, 1985 – December 30, 1988
- Network: Syndication
- Release: September 18, 1989 – March 16, 1990

Jackpot (also referred to as Jackpot!) is an American and Canadian television game show produced by Bob Stewart which saw contestants attempting to solve riddles in order to win cash and prizes.

Jackpot made its debut on the NBC television network on January 7, 1974 as part of their daytime schedule and ran until September 26, 1975. The show was videotaped in New York City, where Stewart was based at the time, and was hosted by Geoff Edwards. In 1985, Stewart teamed up with USA Network and Global Television Network for a revival that aired in both the United States and Canada. This edition of Jackpot aired on USA and Global from September 30, 1985 until December 30, 1988 and was produced in Toronto, Ontario, with Mike Darow as host. After the Canadian-produced Jackpot ended, Stewart developed another series for American syndication, this time based in the Los Angeles area of Glendale, California (Stewart moved there in the early 1980s). That series (the only one to refer to the title with the exclamation point in it) debuted on September 18, 1989 with Edwards once again hosting, coming to an end on March 16, 1990 after its syndicator went out of business.

The first series was announced by Don Pardo until early 1975, when Wayne Howell replaced him, marking Pardo's last announcing gig for an NBC game show. The 1985 series saw announcing duties shared by Global announcers John Harris and Ken Ryan, the latter of whom was also the announcer on the USA/Global collaboration Bumper Stumpers. The 1989 series saw Johnny Gilbert and John Harlan split the announcing duties.

Elements of Jackpot's gameplay were later used in the GSN original game show Hollywood Showdown. Its producer, Sande Stewart (son of Jackpot! creator Bob Stewart), became a production partner of his father during the 1980s.

== Gameplay ==
Sixteen contestants competed for an entire week, with one designated King/Queen of the Hill, who stood at a circular podium at stage-left. The other fifteen contestants, numbered 1 through 15, were seated in three-tiered bleachers and were given wallets containing riddles. The King/Queen selected one number at a time, and the contestant in that seat opened his/her wallet and asked the riddle inside. The King/Queen retained control of the game on a correct answer, or switched places with the contestant on a miss.

Most riddles had a dollar value attached, which was added to the Jackpot. One contestant per game held a Jackpot Riddle, which allowed him/her to split the Jackpot with the King/Queen if answered correctly.

A secondary objective involved the Super Jackpot, a separate cash award. At the start of each new game, a three-digit "Target Number" that always ended in 0 or 5 was chosen at random by a computer. If the last three digits of the Jackpot total matched the Target Number at any time, the King/Queen could split the Super Jackpot with the chosen contestant by correctly answering a riddle - either the one held by the contestant, or a special one asked by the host, depending on the version.

Depending on the rules or the situation, the King/Queen could ask the Jackpot Riddle-holder to be seated and continue the game, with the intent of finding a bonus, raising the Jackpot, and/or playing for the Super Jackpot.

All contestants kept their accumulated cash/prizes and left the show at the end of the broadcast week. If a game was in progress when time ran out on a Friday episode, the King/Queen chose one more contestant and played that riddle for the Jackpot.

=== Special riddles ===
A correct answer to any of these riddles affected gameplay as follows.

- Double Dollars (Syndicated) – Doubled the entire Jackpot.
- Instant Target Match (Syndicated) – Added enough money to the Jackpot to match its last three digits against the target. The King/Queen and the Riddler were then given a chance to win the Super Jackpot.
- Bonus Prize (all) – Awarded a prize to the King/Queen.
- Return Trip (USA/Syndicated) – Allowed both the Riddler and the King/Queen to return for the following week of episodes.
- Super Jackpot Wildcard (NBC) – Gave the Riddler and the King/Queen a chance to win the Super Jackpot but left the Jackpot unchanged.

==== NBC (1974–1975) ====
The King/Queen was referred to as the Expert. Riddles on this version ranged in value from $5 to $200 in multiples of $5, and Target Numbers could go no higher than $995. After the selection of a Target Number, a Multiplier ranging from 5 to 50 was chosen at random (although 15 and 20 were twice as likely to appear) and was multiplied with the Target Number to determine the Super Jackpot (e.g., $500×30 = $15,000). If the Target Number was $995 and the Multiplier was 50, the Super Jackpot was automatically set to $50,000.

The Super Jackpot could be played for in one of two ways:

1. Initially, if the Expert solved a riddle whose value caused the last three digits of the Jackpot to match the Target Number, he/she and the Riddler split the Super Jackpot. Later, a correct answer in this situation led to a second riddle, asked by the host, with the Super Jackpot at stake.
2. By finding a Super Jackpot Wildcard as described above.

Originally, the contestant who answered the most riddles in the week won a car. This was later changed to awarding a car to anyone who answered all fifteen riddles in a single game. After a week-long experiment in February 1974 (when it was called "The Valentine Riddle"), most games had a "Double Bonus" riddle which, if answered correctly, won the two contestants involved a trip, usually to somewhere in Mexico or the Caribbean.

Beginning on June 30, 1975, the format was altered for the last 13 weeks of the run:

- The Target Number and Multiplier were dropped. Instead, the Super Jackpot was established at random to a value between $2,000 and $10,000 (in $100 increments).
- Riddles were replaced with straight yes-no, true-false, or multiple-choice general knowledge questions.
- When the Jackpot Question was found, the Expert could either try to answer it or go for the Super Jackpot by answering all remaining questions in the game, including the Jackpot Question. If the contestant missed any of the remaining questions, the Jackpot was reset to $0 and a new Super Jackpot was established.
- In the event that the Jackpot Question was the last one found, the Super Jackpot was discarded.

==== Canadian/USA Network (1985–1988) ====
All prizes in this version were paid in Canadian dollars.

The riddles and Target Number returned, but there was no multiplier; the Super Jackpot was set at random, ranging from $4,000 to $9,900 in $100 increments. There was no separate Super Jackpot Riddle in this series. Instead, if a riddle was worth enough to cause a target match, it allowed both contestants to split the Super Jackpot and left the King/Queen in control of the game if answered correctly. For each game, the Jackpot started at $100, and riddles were valued anywhere from $50 to $300 (again in $5 increments). Also, if the Jackpot Riddle was not found until the last contestant, an extra $1,000 was added to the Jackpot. Once the Jackpot Riddle was found and attempted, the contestant holding it traded places with the King/Queen regardless of the outcome.

Starting in season two, any contestant who answered all 15 riddles without a miss won a new car. Also added was a "$10,000 Riddler Contest" in which the contestant who answered the most riddles correctly in a single week over a period of 10 weeks won a bonus of $10,000, with tied contestants splitting the money. A similar contest was held during the final six weeks of the second season, awarding a vacation package and $1,000 cash to the contestant with the most correct answers in a single week.

The final season featured a "$50,000 Riddle" contest. All contestants who found and answered one of these designated riddles, which were considerably more difficult than the others used on the show, won equal shares of a $50,000 cash prize at the end of the season.

This version of the show also included a "Return Trip" riddle, which allowed both its holder and the King/Queen to return for the next week of shows if it was answered correctly.

==== Syndicated (1989–1990) ====
In this version, the value of the riddle was only added to the Jackpot if the riddle was answered correctly. In addition, the Super Jackpot Riddle returned but now either the King/Queen or the bleacher contestant who asked the riddle that brought the Jackpot amount to the target number could respond. The bleacher contestant made a guess first, and if he/she was wrong, the King/Queen made a guess him/herself; this was later changed to having only one answer accepted from the first contestant to speak up. If either contestant was correct, they both split the Super Jackpot.

Also, if the King/Queen answered all fifteen riddles without a miss, $1,000 was added to the Jackpot. Finally, Super Jackpots on this version ranged from $10,000 to $25,000 (in $500 increments), and riddles ranged from $50 to $300 (in $5 increments once again).

== Broadcast History ==
=== NBC (1974–1975) ===
The network's head of daytime programming, Lin Bolen, placed Jackpot at Noon eastern (11:00 AM Central), where the venerable Jeopardy! had run for nearly eight years. Jeopardy! brought in audiences who did not ordinarily watch daytime television, such as businessmen and college students, primarily due to its intellectually challenging game play; these people often watched the show during their lunch hour on television sets at restaurants, college student centers, or bars rather than at home. The move of Jeopardy! to 10:30/9:30 caused an audience loss that Jackpot!, aimed at a more traditional female audience, was unable to replace.

The show was initially greenlit under the proposed title Bank-O, which was also the title for the pilot, but renamed at the last minute.

Jackpot replaced The Who, What, or Where Game via a scheduling shuffle with the aforementioned Jeopardy! and Baffle. The breakout popularity of CBS' youth-oriented serial The Young and the Restless led to an erosion of Jeopardy!'s audience, and the new show inherited the ratings problems. Still, Jackpot! managed to earn respectable ratings throughout 1974; it looked at one point to be more promising than its sister show, The $10,000 Pyramid, during the latter's final month on CBS (but before its move to ABC in May, where it became a hit). Nonetheless, Y&R broke into the daytime Nielsen top ten by early 1975.

Edwards hosted Jackpot at the same time he was hosting the Chuck Barris-produced game show Treasure Hunt. Jackpot taped in New York City while Treasure Hunt was taped in Los Angeles. Not only was Edwards one of the first hosts to host more than one game show simultaneously, he also was one of the first to work bi-coastally (Dick Clark and Gene Rayburn did the same), a practice that became much more common for celebrities in the future.

==== Cancellation ====
In reaction to the show's slumping ratings, Bolen decided to revamp Jackpot by making use of a "focus group", a then-new audience analysis technique. Edwards stated that Bolen's group participants expressed a strong dislike for the show's foundational riddle format. Bolen accepted this judgment and gave Stewart an ultimatum – replace the riddles with a straightforward question-answer format or be canceled. In addition, Edwards was told to not question this decision or he would be replaced.

This was one of several changes instituted beginning on June 30, 1975. On July 7, the show moved back one half-hour, but the new time slot brought much stronger competition in the form of soap operas Search for Tomorrow on CBS and ABC's All My Children, the latter already a big hit with younger audiences. The show was further hampered by a five-minute newscast airing at 12:55, forcing it to also shrink to 25 minutes.

The combination of strong competition and the forced change in format led to the end of Jackpot after a twenty-one-month run on September 26, 1975. NBC's replacement, Three for the Money, did even worse, running only nine weeks. Jackpot's cancellation also marked the first time in NBC daytime history that no games originated from Rockefeller Center (with all other game shows taping at NBC's West Coast studios in Burbank, California instead). Only one other NBC game show afterward, the Stewart-packaged Shoot for the Stars (which was also hosted by Edwards), was taped in New York. In fact, the only other NBC daytime show to tape at Rockefeller Center for the remainder of the 1970s was the soap opera The Doctors. (Another World and Somerset recorded at off-site studios in Brooklyn.)

The series marked Don Pardo's final appearance as a regular game show announcer, having done games since Winner Take All in 1952 (also the first network television game hosted by Bill Cullen and the first television series by Goodson-Todman). On October 11, 1975 – fifteen days after Jackpot!'s demise – Pardo emerged on NBC's new weekly comedy-variety series NBC's Saturday Night. With the exception of one season for the latter show, he was the announcer for the series until his death in 2014. Pardo also did not appear on another game show until November 1988, when he was the announcer of the nighttime syndicated version of Wheel of Fortune for two weeks of episodes at New York's Radio City Music Hall.

=== CBS Pilot (1984) ===
In 1984, Stewart produced a new version for CBS with Nipsey Russell hosting and Johnny Gilbert announcing, which did not sell. Unlike the earlier or subsequent versions, there was no Target Number or Super Jackpot. The Jackpot started at $150, with that amount going into it for each riddle solved. If the Jackpot riddle was found but was not attempted immediately, the value for each correct answer doubled to $300. If the Jackpot riddle was not found until the last contestant, $5,000 was automatically added to the Jackpot.

When the Jackpot riddle was solved, the winning King/Queen and Riddler played a bonus round called "Riddle-grams," which was played similar to another Stewart-produced show, Shoot for the Stars. Two clues were shown. The clues, when answered in the order they were read, made a two-word phrase. One contestant guessed the first half of the phrase, and the other contestant guessed the second half. If either contestant made a mistake at any time, they lost their chance at the big money, but could still go for all the other phrases, because at the end of the round, the contestants split $100 for each phrase solved. If the contestants could solve all seven phrases without making a mistake, they split $5,000. This was the only version of the show to have a bonus round.

Although this format did not sell in the United States, it was used (albeit with slight changes) on the Welsh version in the 1990s (see below).

=== Canadian/USA Network (1985–1988) ===
The program was recorded in Toronto for the Global Television Network and aired in America on USA Network. The 1980s Jackpot was able to avoid the nation's "CanCon" quota system of requirements as host Mike Darow, whose previous hosting positions (The $128,000 Question and the original Dream House) were on American productions, was born in Canada and had worked on Toronto radio in the 1960s.

All cash awards to contestants were paid in Canadian dollars, which at the time was considerably weaker than the U.S. dollar. The resulting financial advantage lured packagers such as Stewart to produce games in Canada. Ken Ryan and John Harris, Global staff voice-over artists, served as announcers on this version.

=== Syndicated (1989–1990) ===
Jackpot! (with an exclamation point in the title) returned in American syndication in the fall of 1989. The program was a production of Bob Stewart Productions and Reeves Entertainment Group with Palladium Entertainment distributing.

However, the show met its demise before the end of a full season, not because of low ratings, but because of its distributor having serious financial problems. As a ploy to try to generate sponsorship cash as quickly as possible, the company forced the staff to record over 10 episodes per day for a period of over two weeks. Under normal circumstances, half-hour weekday "strip" shows taped only three to five episodes per day, depending on the studio's schedule. By spring 1990, Palladium Entertainment shuttered its operations after declaring bankruptcy, and the remaining stations pulled Jackpot! from their schedules immediately.

Despite this, much like he did almost fifteen years earlier by hosting bi-coastal game shows, Edwards became the third game show host in the industry to simultaneously emcee a game show on both sides of the Canada–US border, joining Jim Perry and Alex Trebek. Edwards also hosted the Canadian-produced Chain Reaction and the Sacramento-produced The Big Spin, the weekly California Lottery program, at that time.

Two veteran announcers, John Harlan and Johnny Gilbert, provided the voice-over for this version. Jim Perry's daughter, Erin, served as the series' associate producer.

== International versions ==
Country	Name	Host	Network	Premiere	Finale
Brazil	Clube dos Quinze	Silvio Santos	TV Globo	1975	1976
Brazil	Clube dos Quinze	Silvio Santos	Tupi	1975	1976
Wales	Jacpot	Kevin Davies	S4C	August 2, 1993	1999
Wales	Jacpot	Rhodri Ogwen	S4C	March 2, 2012	November 23, 2012

== Other information ==
=== Home version ===
Milton Bradley made only one edition in 1974, but with two different covers – one with just the logo, and one with a drawing of a female contestant. Other than the cosmetic difference, the game is the same in both boxes; the gameplay more closely resembles the 1980s Darow format, with the Target Number randomly established and Super Jackpots of only four-figure amounts.

=== Theme ===
Jackpot! used several different themes during its runs; the NBC version used the instrumental theme music "Jet Set", composed by former Manfred Mann member Mike Vickers. The piece was later used as the opening theme for This Week in Baseball. The USA and syndicated runs used the Shoot for the Stars theme composed by Bob Cobert. The Bebu Silvetti song "Spring Rain", itself previously used as the theme for Stewart's The Love Experts, was used for the unsold 1984 pilot.

== Episode status ==
- NBC: According to host Geoff Edwards, nearly all episodes were destroyed as per network practices of the era. Three episodes are known to exist: the fourth episode on January 10, 1974, the episode from January 3, 1975 (which featured a $38,750 Super Jackpot win), and the September 26, 1975 finale. The January 10, 1974 episode and the finale exist in audio format.
- USA/syndicated: Both runs are intact and have been seen on GSN.
