= Milton Scott Michel =

American dramatist

Milton Scott Michel (October 23, 1916 – July 8, 1992) was an American crime fiction writer and playwright. His most notable work was published in the 1940s – 1960s.

He attended New York University from 1935–1941, and worked as a technician for a diagnostic x-ray lab in New York City from 1940–1944, after which he became a self-employed writer.

He was a member of the Authors' League of America and the Dramatist Guild.

Sometimes credited as M. Scott Michel, Milton Scott, and Scott Michel, and was a writer and editor for the Atlantic Beach Villager and Spotlite.

== Bibliography ==
- The X-Ray Murders (1942) aka Harlequin #64 as Sinister Warning.
- Sweet Murder (1943) aka Harlequin #42 - The House In Harlem (1950)
- The Psychiatric Murders (1946) aka Murder in the Consulting Room
- The Black Key (1946)
- The Murder Of Me, a three-act play (1961)
- Time To Kill (date unknown)
- A Country Reborn documentary script (1966)

As Milton Scott:

- Dear, Dead Harry (1947).

As Scott Michel:

- Angels Kiss Me, a Broadway play (1951)
- Rise By Sin, a Broadway play (1952)
- Sixth Finger In A Five Finger Glove, a Broadway play (1956), featured music by Charles Strouse
- Journey Into Limbo: A Novel of Intimate Adventure (1962)

== Trivia ==
Charles Strouse's "Sixth Finger Theme", originally written for the play Sixth Finger In A Five Finger Glove, was used as the original theme music for The Price Is Right from 1956 to 1961.
