= Three on a Match (game show) =

- Genre: Game show
- Created by: Bob Stewart
- Presented by: Bill Cullen
- Announcer: Don Pardo; Bob Clayton (substitute); Wayne Howell (substitute); Roger Tuttle (substitute)
- Country of origin: United States
- No. of episodes: 725

Production
- Production locations: NBC Studios; New York, New York
- Production company: Bob Stewart Productions

Original release
- Network: NBC
- Release: August 2, 1971 – June 28, 1974

Three on a Match is an American television game show created by Bob Stewart that ran on NBC from August 2, 1971 to June 28, 1974 on its daytime schedule. The host was Bill Cullen and Don Pardo served as announcer on most episodes, with Bob Clayton and NBC staffers Wayne Howell and Roger Tuttle substituting at times.

The series was produced at NBC's Rockefeller Center in New York City. The program's title is wordplay on the superstition of the same name.

== Game play ==
Three contestants competed to determine who could answer the most true-or-false questions in one of three categories. After Cullen announced the categories, each contestant secretly bid on the number of questions he/she wanted to answer, from one to four. The outcome was determined as follows:

- If all three contestants placed different bids, the high bidder won.
- If two contestants placed matching bids, they canceled each other out and the third contestant won, regardless of whether his/her bid was higher or lower.
- If all three bids matched, a second round of bidding was held. If this round also ended in a deadlock, the bids and categories were thrown out and three new categories were presented.

The pot for each round was equal to $10 times the total of the contestants' final bids, with a potential maximum of $110.

The winning bidder chose one category and tried to correctly answer the number of questions he/she had stated. A miss passed control to the second-highest bidder, then the third if necessary. In these cases, the contestant who gained control chose a new category from the ones not yet used. If the other two contestants had matched each other, a miss gave them a chance to bid again. The higher bidder then chose one of the two remaining categories. If the re-bid ended in another deadlock, all three categories were thrown out and replaced and a new round was played. The first contestant to complete his/her bid won the entire pot, after which three new categories were shown.

Some categories had a special feature hidden behind them, which was revealed when it was selected. The most frequent was "Double Pot," which doubled the value of the pot for that round (to a potential maximum of $220). Other special features offered one, two, or three free boxes to the winner of the round, to be used on the Prize Board (see below).

Upon winning a pot, a contestant could either keep the money and play another round, or use his/her accumulated money in an attempt to win the game at the Prize Board. If the contestant had won any free boxes, he/she had to either use them immediately or forfeit them.

=== Prize Board ===
The Prize Board displayed 12 boxes arranged in four rows of three. Each row was a different color (red, green, yellow, blue), and each column was a different value ($20, $30, $40). Originally, prizes were hidden behind the boxes. At least one prize appeared in all three columns while others did not, and one box hid a "No Match" card.

The contestant spent his/her accumulated money to uncover boxes, calling for them by color and value, and could reveal no more than three boxes in any one column. Once the contestant could no longer afford any remaining boxes, he/she could call for any free ones earned in the game. If the contestant revealed the same prize in all three columns, he/she received it and won the game, and two new challengers were brought in for the next one. If he/she ran out of money and free boxes without winning a prize, the game continued. Regardless of the outcome, the contestant kept any remaining money.

A minimum of $90, $50, or $20 was required to play the Prize Board with zero, one, or two free boxes, respectively.

A contestant who made a match on his/her first three choices won a new car in addition to that prize. Any champion who won five consecutive games retired undefeated and received an additional $5,000.

=== Format changes ===
On April 23, 1973, the prizes were replaced with images that fit a particular theme, such as hats, slot machine symbols, musical instruments, or even humorously altered photos of Cullen. In order to win a game, a contestant had to either make three matches on the board, or complete a match with his/her first three picks (an "instant match"). The winner of each game received a prize package worth at least $5,000.

Later in the show's run, a "Big Match" game was played partway through an episode, briefly interrupting the regular game. Pictures representing the two halves of a $1,000 bill were hidden on the board, and the contestants took turns revealing one box at a time. If a contestant found one half, he/she was given one chance to find the other half and win a cash bonus, which started at $1,000 and increased by that amount for every five games it went unclaimed. If a total of nine blank boxes were revealed, or if the contestant who found one half failed to find the other on his/her extra turn, the game ended. The Big Match had no effect on gameplay and served primarily as a substitute for the bonus games frequently used on other shows of the era, which NBC and packager Bob Stewart decided not to incorporate into Three on a Match.

Another bonus was later added, awarding $5,000 in cash and a new car to any player who made seven consecutive matches at the board. In addition, champions were no longer retired and remained on the show as long as they continued to win games, a departure from the NBC (and industry) norm that had been established in the wake of the 1950s quiz show scandals.

Other bonuses and features were added and removed throughout the run to stimulate viewer interest. During the second format, home viewers were invited to send in postcard entries for theme-writing contests. The three funniest entries won prizes.

Also during the second format, a special symbol (such as a heart) would appear on the board in every game during certain special weeks, regardless of whether or not it fit the image theme. Each contestant who matched the symbols would be entered into a drawing for a special prize at the end of that week.

The format was changed again for the final 13 weeks of the show's run. During the main game, the host would announce a category and then ask five open-ended toss-up questions. The first question was worth $40, and the value increased by $10 per question to a maximum of $80 on the fifth. A correct answer added the value to the contestant's score, while a miss deducted it and also gave half the money to each opponent. In addition, a STOP sign was hidden behind one box on the board. If a contestant found this item while buying boxes, their turn ended immediately.

== Broadcast history ==
Three on a Match had the unenviable position of being the sixth show NBC had aired in the 1:30 PM (12:30 Central) time slot since December 30, 1968, when the network lost Let's Make a Deal to rival ABC, which placed it in the same slot it had aired in on NBC. A soap opera (Hidden Faces), three game shows (You're Putting Me On, Words and Music, and Memory Game), and a comeback attempt by Art Linkletter (Life with Linkletter) were the preceding shows that failed over a two-and-a-half-year period. Three on a Match replaced Memory Game, a Joe Garagiola vehicle.

Three on a Match was not only the first show since the Deal defection to run for more than a year against the ABC version and CBS' top-rated As the World Turns (then a half-hour soap opera), but it also brought several affiliates that had preempted the slot back to the network feed for that half-hour, which pleasantly surprised NBC executives.

Although finishing solidly in third place, Cullen's perennial popularity drove the appeal of Three on a Match which, typical for NBC games in that era (and especially those staged in New York), emphasized game play over large prizes and ostentatious sets. On April 23, 1973 the series became NBC's only game to receive an exemption from the network's five-game limit for returning champions.

However, by spring 1974 daytime head Lin Bolen, who had overseen the cancellation of several games started before her arrival a year and a half earlier, asked Stewart to overhaul Three on a Match. When this failed to improve ratings, the two decided instead to start from scratch with a new game, titled Winning Streak.

The new show replaced Three on a Match and swapped time slots with Jeopardy!, a decision that would prove to be fatal to both programs. Both shows ended on January 3, 1975.

=== Merchandise ===
Milton Bradley made only one edition in 1972, which followed the first Prize Board version.

=== Australian version ===
Reg Grundy bought the rights to produce an Australian version for the Seven Network hosted by Bob Moore. It was promoted as "Australia's first color game show", although Australian television was still transitioning from black and white to color broadcasting during that time. Gameplay remained the same with a similar set as the American version used, as with other Grundy productions. However, the question and board values were divided by ten, meaning each pot was worth $1 per number of questions. Also, the Prize Board was played as a standard end game, with a vacation as the top prize.

=== Attempted reboot ===
In early 1983, Bob Stewart Productions entered into a partnership with Dick Clark Productions (a production company owned by the host of Pyramid, Dick Clark) and Syndicast Services to develop a 90-minute game show block consisting of revivals of old Stewart properties Eye Guess, Three on a Match and Chain Reaction for a possible launch that fall, then attempted to delay the launch to 1984-1985, but none of the planned revivals got off the ground. Jack Clark was slated to host the attempted reboot of Three on a Match.

== Episode status ==
The series is believed to have been wiped, as per network practices of that era. Six episodes from March and April 1973 are held at the UCLA Film and Television Archive. Five episodes from February 1974 featuring a New York-area contestant, Fred Abrahams, have been released on the internet, and are from his own library. Another episode from December 1973 (with Howell announcing), a partial recording of a 1971 episode, and an audio recording of the June 1974 series finale, have been released on YouTube.

The status of the Australian version is not known, but may have also been wiped. A single episode of the version is held by the National Film and Sound Archive.
