= Bob Stewart (television producer) =

American television producer (1920–2012)

- Stewart in 1998
- Born: Isidore L. Steinberg; August 27, 1920; Brooklyn, New York, U.S.
- Died: May 4, 2012 (aged 91); Los Angeles, California, U.S.
- Occupation: Television producer
- Years active: 1956–1991
- Television: To Tell the Truth; Password; The Price Is Right; Pyramid
- Board member of: Stewart Television
- Children: 3
- Awards: Daytime Emmy Award
- Website: stewarttelevision.com

Signature
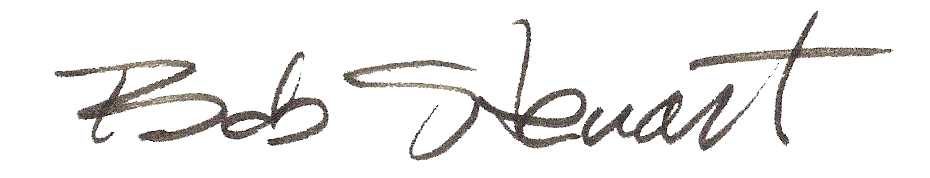

Bob Stewart (born Isidore L. Steinberg; August 27, 1920 – May 4, 2012) was an American television game show producer. He was active in the TV industry from 1956 until his retirement in 1991.

Stewart is known for creating some of the most popular game shows for Mark Goodson-Bill Todman Productions. These shows include To Tell the Truth, Password, and The Price Is Right. His biggest success as an independent producer was the Pyramid series, starting with The $10,000 Pyramid in 1973.

The Price Is Right and To Tell the Truth, both created by Stewart, are the only game shows to be seen nationally in either first-run network or syndication airings in the US in every decade from the 1950s onward.

As of 2023, three Stewart creations are airing on television: The Price Is Right, Pyramid and Password.

== Early life ==
Stewart was born Isidore Steinberg in Brooklyn, New York City to Jacob and Dora Steinberg, who were Jewish immigrants from Russia. He changed his name to Bob Stewart after he lost an opportunity in television believing that it was because he was Jewish.

During World War II, Stewart served in the Air Force. After his 1946 discharge, he enrolled in a radio-writing course. Within weeks, his instructor hired him to work at a New York City radio station.

== Stewart with Goodson-Todman ==
Stewart's early broadcasting career included a stint at WNEW in New York City, and then at NBC's flagship TV and radio stations, WNBC-TV and AM, also in New York. In the book The Box, the native New Yorker said he got the first spark for The Price Is Right during his tenure as a staff producer at WRCA-TV (now WNBC-TV) when he happened to observe an auction taking place on 50th Street on his lunch hour. He developed the idea into the working title of The Auctionaire.

Stewart joined Goodson-Todman Productions in 1956, after he bumped into broadcaster (and future game show producer-host) Monty Hall on the street and Hall told him he knew Goodson-Todman's attorney. "You got any ideas?" Stewart quoted Hall as asking.

The Price Is Right, using some of the Auctionaire concept, premiered on NBC November 26, 1956, with Bill Cullen as host. It lasted seven years on NBC before being bumped in favor of Hall's Let's Make a Deal in 1963; after that, Price moved to ABC, where it lasted another two years. In September 1972, after Stewart left Goodson-Todman, Mark Goodson retooled The Price is Right, mixing Stewart's original bidding format with elements from Let's Make a Deal to create The New Price Is Right, which debuted in syndication and on CBS' daytime lineup.

CBS' To Tell the Truth, emceed by Bud Collyer, hit the air less than one month after the original Price debuted, in December 1956. Stewart said he auditioned the concept to Goodson and his producers by trying to have them guess which one of three men had been in the infantry in World War II and was now managing a grocery store. (The original pilot, hosted by Mike Wallace and existing as a kinescope, was titled Nothing But The Truth.)

Five years later, in 1961, Stewart scored again with Password, a word-association guessing game. The show, the first game to pair celebrities and civilian contestants, became the top-rated program on daytime TV and popularized the concept of an end-game bonus round (the popular "Lightning Round") for additional money. (In June 2008, CBS and FremantleMedia revived the game in an updated big-money format titled Million Dollar Password based on the Lightning Round as well as Stewart's Pyramid game formats. His son, Sande Stewart, served as a creative consultant.)

Stewart was one of a coterie of Goodson staff producers who came up with ideas for game shows and segments. Producers such as Stewart, Frank Wayne, Chester Feldman, and Gil Fates earned Goodson's respect not only for their concepts but for their skill in executing them.

=== Leaving Goodson-Todman ===
By 1964, he seriously considered leaving Goodson-Todman Productions after proposing an idea for a new word association game to Goodson, which Goodson rejected. When Stewart gave his notice, Goodson tried to get him to reconsider by making him a full partner in the company, but when it was revealed that Stewart's own name would not be added to the company name, Stewart decided to resign, though Goodson-Todman would retain all rights to his creations up to that point.

Stewart's rejected idea would go on to become The $10,000 Pyramid by 1973.

== Bob Stewart Productions ==
Shortly after leaving Goodson-Todman, the primetime version of The Price Is Right had been canceled by ABC, and rating for the daytime version were falling. Stewart's first production under his own banner (Bob Stewart Productions) was the memory game Eye Guess, which aired on NBC daytime from January 3, 1966 to September 26, 1969, and featured close friend Bill Cullen, as emcee.

Stewart's next entry, the CBS primetime celebrity game show The Face Is Familiar with host Jack Whitaker, ran from May 7 to September 3, 1966. Another Stewart celebrity game, Personality (hosted by Larry Blyden), aired on NBC from 1967-1969. Completing the decade for the packager was You're Putting Me On, hosted first by Bill Leyden and later by Blyden, which ran from June–December 1969.

Other than Eye Guess, Stewart's other moderate early success was Three on a Match, hosted by Cullen, which aired on NBC from August 2, 1971 to June 28, 1974.

Stewart's biggest success with his second production company, Basada, Inc. (named after his sons Barry, Sande, and David), and one of TV's most honored and popular game shows, was Pyramid, originally hosted by Dick Clark, which, like Password, was a word-association game. Its March 26, 1973, premiere on CBS marked the biggest possible cash payoff on a quiz show since the short-lived 100 Grand in September 1963.

Pyramid's network run would span 15 years, off and on, with escalating dollar amounts in the title reflecting increases in the payoff amount over the years. It had proven to be one of the most enduring game shows, airing almost continuously between first-run network or syndicated airings and cable reruns since 1982, when the second CBS version began. Its nine Emmy awards for best game show rank it second to the current version of Jeopardy! (premiered in 1984 with Alex Trebek as host until October 29, 2020 tapings, and currently Ken Jennings since 2021), which has 19 wins (combined daytime and primetime).

The original The $10,000 Pyramid aired on CBS until March 1974, when it was canceled during a rating panic. It then moved to ABC, where the top prize increased to $20,000 in 1976. The $25,000 Pyramid aired from 1982 to 1987, and again briefly in 1988, on CBS. The show was also popular in syndication, running weekly from 1974 to 1979, and in daily versions from January to September 1981, 1985 to 1988 (concurrently with the CBS version), and January 7 to December 6, 1991. Clark hosted all of these versions except the weekly series (with Bill Cullen) and the 1991 series (with John Davidson). The latter two offered potential cash payoffs of $100,000 in quarterly tournaments among champion contestants. Another version of Pyramid, packaged by Sony, which now possesses the rights to Stewart's shows, aired in syndication from 2002–2004 hosted by Donny Osmond. Yet another version titled The Pyramid was aired as original programming on GSN in 2012 and hosted by Mike Richards. Currently, The $100,000 Pyramid airs on ABC as part of its Fun & Games series of game shows and is hosted by Michael Strahan.

Pyramid nearly led to Stewart's one significant foray outside the world of TV games, when he was hired to produce occasional panelist David Letterman's NBC daytime show in 1980. However, due to creative disagreements, Stewart left the staff four days before the show's premiere.

Bob Stewart Productions was the last major game show production company to relocate from New York to Los Angeles. Its first show there in full-time production was The Love Experts for syndication in the fall of 1978, but Pyramid remained in New York until 1981. Coincidentally, during the first half of 1980 the company's New York-based Pyramid on ABC was competing in the same 12:00 noon (Eastern) time slot against its Los Angeles-based Chain Reaction on NBC (both shows were cancelled in June of that year).

Other Stewart productions, mostly employing a word or puzzle format, included Winning Streak (1974–75), Blankety Blanks (1975), Shoot for the Stars (1977), Pass the Buck (1978), Go (1983–84), and Double Talk (1986).

By 1982, almost all of the Bob Stewart games originated from Hollywood, except that the updated versions of Jackpot! and Chain Reaction produced for the USA Network on cable during the mid-1980s were videotaped in the Canadian cities of Toronto and Montreal, respectively. This version of Jackpot! Hosted by Mike Darow was co-produced with the Canadian television network Global. The updated Chain Reaction hosted first by Blake Emmons and then by Geoff Edwards was co-produced with Champlain Productions. Stewart, a native New Yorker, had resisted the move because he appreciated the intelligence and energy contestants from the city brought to Pyramid and his other shows. Luckily for Stewart, the show's energetic format was familiar enough to potential contestants nationwide that it endured through the 1980s and beyond.

Jackpot! and Chain Reaction were moderate successes for Stewart in their 1980s runs on USA Network (1985–88 and 1986–91, respectively) after having relatively brief runs on NBC. A revived Chain hosted by Dylan Lane and produced in New York by Michael Davies ran on GSN for two 65-episode seasons from 2006 to 2007. GSN would air two more runs of Chain, first with Mike Catherwood hosting for 40 episodes from 2015 to 2016, and then the current version with Lane hosting once again, which premiered on February 22, 2021.

== Retirement ==
In the mid-1980s, Stewart began winding down his career, and his son, Sande, gradually took over operations, with all shows after 1987 being known under Bob Stewart & Sande Stewart Productions. In 1990, the company was renamed Stewart Television. Bob Stewart would fully retire in 1991 after the second run of The $100,000 Pyramid was canceled, with Sande taking over full operations. Sande later produced some game shows on his own, including Your Number's Up, which went up against the elder Bob Stewart's Pyramid, Remember This?, Sports on Tap, Inquizition, Hollywood Showdown, Missouri Lottery Fun & Fortune, The Oklahoma Lottery Game Show and Powerball Instant Millionaire.

Stewart Television was sold to Sony Pictures Entertainment in 1994, and many of Bob Stewart's creations aired frequently on GSN. Stewart himself participated in panels and special events related to quiz shows, including the annual Game Show Congress gatherings in the Los Angeles metropolitan area.

While Stewart was not an active producer after 1991, he served as a Creative Consultant in his son's new production company, Stewart Television, and was listed on the official website as Stewart Television's founder.

In 2006, Stewart's long-time companion, Anne-Marie Schmitt, passed away. Schmitt was also the producer of many of Stewart's productions.

Until 2006, Stewart held a record for the most Daytime Emmy Awards in game show production. The record was broken by Harry Friedman, who serves as Executive Producer of Wheel of Fortune and Jeopardy!.

In 2010, Stewart was inducted into the Television Academy Hall of Fame for his contributions to television and its evolution.

== Death ==
On May 4, 2012, Stewart died at Cedars-Sinai Medical Center in Los Angeles, California of natural causes. On June 16, 2013, during the 40th Daytime Emmy Awards, Stewart was posthumously honored with the Lifetime Achievement Award. His son Sande Stewart accepted the award on his behalf.

== Bob Stewart shows ==
- Eye Guess (1966–1969, NBC)
- The Face Is Familiar (1966, CBS prime time)
- Personality (1967–1969, NBC)
- You're Putting Me On (1969, NBC)
- Three on a Match (1971–1974, NBC)
- Pyramid

The $10,000 Pyramid (1973–1974, CBS; 1974–1976, ABC)
The $20,000 Pyramid (1976–1980, ABC)
The $25,000 Pyramid (1974–1979, weekly syndication)
The $50,000 Pyramid (1981, daily syndication)
The (New) $25,000 Pyramid (1982–1988, CBS)
The $100,000 Pyramid (1985–1988, daily syndication)
The $100,000 Pyramid (1991, daily syndication)

- Jackpot!

1974–1975, NBC
1985–1988, USA Network
1989–1990, daily syndication

- Winning Streak (1974–1975, NBC)
- Blankety Blanks (1975, ABC)
- Shoot for the Stars (1977, NBC)
- Pass the Buck (1978, CBS daytime)
- The Love Experts (1978–1979, daily syndication)
- Chain Reaction (1980, NBC daytime, 1986–1991 USA Network)
- Go (1983–1984, NBC)
- Double Talk (1986, ABC; revival of Shoot for the Stars)
