= Salsoul Jam 2000 =

Compilation album (DJ mix) by Grandmaster Flash
- Released: July 1, 1997
- Genre: R&B
- Length: 64:24
- Label: Salsoul
- Producer: Joe Cayre

Grandmaster Flash chronology
The Adventures of Grandmaster Flash, Melle Mel & the Furious Five: More of the Best (1996)	Salsoul Jam 2000 (1997)	The Greatest Mixes (1997)

Alternative cover
- Salsoul Jam 2000 was retitled for its European 2003 release as Mixing Bullets and Firing Joints.

Professional ratings
Review scores
Source	Rating
Allmusic	4/5 stars
Allmusic	4/5 stars

Salsoul Jam 2000 (Dance Your Ass Off) is a DJ mix album by Grandmaster Flash. It was originally released in the US in 1997, and was his first release in nine years. The album consists of classic disco tracks originally released on the Salsoul Records label, mixed and segued together as a continuous DJ mix in front of a live crowd.

The album saw its first European release in 2003 with new artwork and retitled as Mixing Bullets and Firing Joints. The eight-page booklet also featured a new essay by Quinton Scott.

== Track listing ==
1. "Party Intro" (Grandmaster Flash) – 0:57
2. "Runaway" (The Salsoul Orchestra featuring Loleatta Holloway) – 3:35
3. "Hit and Run" (Loleatta Holloway) – 2:29
4. "High" (Skyy) – 2:52
5. "Love Thang" (First Choice) – 3:58
6. "Spring Rain" (Silvetti) – 2:42
7. "Doctor Love" (First Choice) – 3:09
8. "Checkin' You Out" (Aurra) – 3:52
9. "Make up Your Mind" (Aurra) – 2:48
10. "I Got My Mind Made Up" (Instant Funk) – 3:56
11. "You're Just the Right Size" (The Salsoul Orchestra) – 2:19
12. "My Love Is Free" (Double Exposure) – 3:52
13. "Ooh I Love It (Love Break)" (The Salsoul Orchestra) – 1:59
14. "Let's Celebrate" (Skyy) – 2:45
15. "Call Me" (Skyy) – 4:26
16. "Slap Slap Lickedy Lap" (Instant Funk) – 3:20
17. "Let No Man Put Asunder" (First Choice) – 3:55
18. "Love Sensation" (Loleatta Holloway) – 3:00
19. "Here's to You" (Skyy) – 3:44
20. "Ten Percent" (Double Exposure) – 4:46
