= Eye Guess =

American television game show

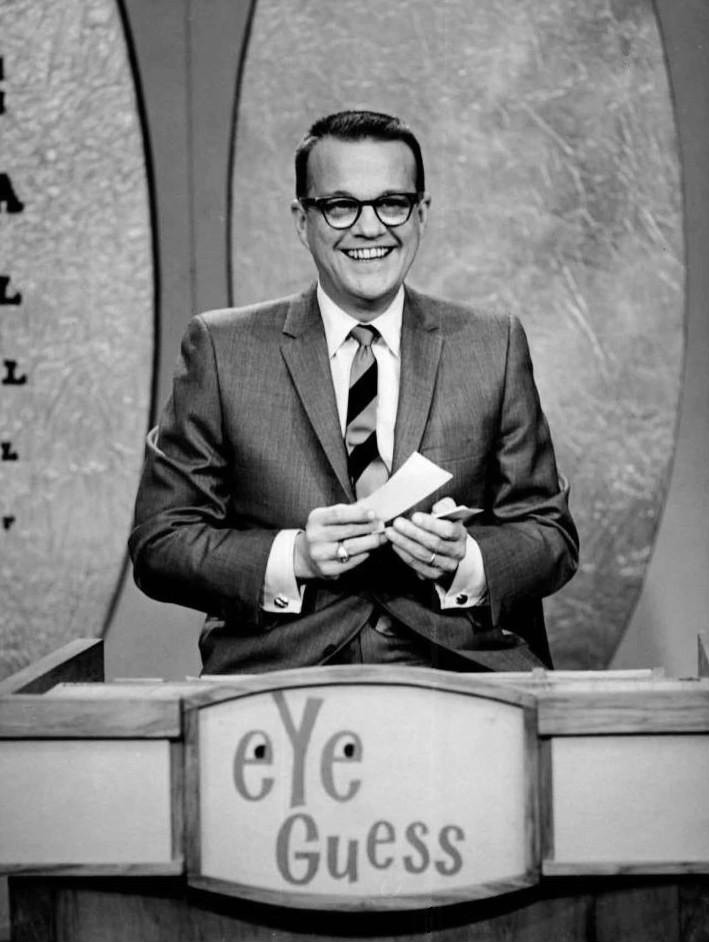
- Host Bill Cullen, 1966.
- Created by: Bob Stewart
- Presented by: Bill Cullen
- Narrated by: Don Pardo (1966–1967); Jack Clark (1967–1969)
- Theme music composer: Billy Sherrill and Buddy Killen ("Sugar Lips" performed by Al Hirt)
- Country of origin: United States

Production
- Camera setup: Multi-camera
- Running time: 22–24 minutes
- Production companies: Bob Stewart Productions; Filmways Television

Original release
- Network: NBC
- Release: January 3, 1966 – September 26, 1969

Eye Guess is an American game show created by Bob Stewart and hosted by Bill Cullen that aired on NBC from January 3, 1966, to September 26, 1969. The game combined a general knowledge quiz with a Concentration-style memory element, in which the answers were shown to the players and their recall of their positions was tested.

This was the first game show by Bob Stewart Productions. Stewart, a former producer for Goodson-Todman Productions, created this series and packaged it with Filmways. Don Pardo announced for the first year, after which Jack Clark replaced him for the rest of the run.

The show used the Al Hirt tune "Sugar Lips" as its theme song.

== Gameplay ==
Two contestants faced a nine-space game board divided into three rows of three boxes. The outer boxes were numbered 1–8, and the center box contained the "Eye Guess" logo. At the beginning of the game, the answers hidden behind the outer boxes were revealed for six-to-nine seconds, then re-covered. Questions were asked by the host, and contestants were required to provide only the number behind which the answer was hidden. Points were awarded for a correct answer, and the contestant who responded correctly was asked another question. As long as they responded correctly, they would continue to be asked questions. If the contestant answered incorrectly, that contestant's turn ended and the opponent was asked the next question. No points were deducted for an incorrect answer.

A contestant could call for the "Eye Guess" space if they thought that the correct answer was not among the eight choices revealed at the start of the game. In such instances, the answer would be revealed only if it was correct for that question. Otherwise, a blank card would be revealed.

Questions in each round covered a wide range of topics and were assembled so that choosing an incorrect number for a question could yield humorous results, which was the main appeal of this otherwise simple game.

Each game consisted of two rounds, with correct answers worth 10 points in the first round and 20 in the second. Although there were nine different answers per round, each round featured only eight questions, meaning that one of the nine answers was not used (and never placed behind the "Eye Guess" space). A contestant who provided five consecutive correct answers won a bonus prize, usually a trip. Toward the end of the show's run, when both contestants missed four consecutive questions in the main game, both received a series of at-home memory improvement books.

The first contestant to reach 100 points won the game and earned the right to play a bonus round. Later, the producers changed the rules, awarding a prize for each correct answer, with seven as the winning score.

Each episode was played to a time limit, and when that limit was reached, an audible signal was played. If a game was in progress when time was called, it would resume on the next show, with any unrevealed answers shuffled into different positions. If time was called during the bonus round, the board was left as it was and the contestant resumed playing on the next show.

There were no returning champions. Each game featured two new contestants.

The game in progress during the final installment of the series did not finish in time. Because there could be no continuation of the game on the following Monday's broadcast, host Bill Cullen explained that the contestants would play the game to its conclusion after the show was over, and the appropriate prizes would be awarded.

== Bonus round ==
The first bonus round was played from January 3–14, 1966. The contestant was shown eight pairs of celebrities (a man and woman). Cullen would read a name, and the contestant would be required to locate that celebrity's spouse on the board. Each correct answer awarded the contestant $25, and a new car was awarded if the board was cleared.

The second bonus round was used from January 17, 1966, to August 30, 1968. Behind seven of the numbers on the board were various prizes; behind the remaining number, a "Stop!" card. The contestant continued to call numbers and win prizes until finding the "Stop!" card. If the contestant revealed all seven prizes, the contestant won a new car, ostensibly hidden behind the "Eye Guess" logo. The contestant kept any prizes revealed prior to the end of the round. If the "Stop!" card was revealed on the first selection, the contestant was allowed to choose another number as a consolation prize.

In one 1967 episode, the prize card for the car was placed behind the #7 slot by mistake instead of the "Eye Guess" slot. Unaware of this, the contestant called out number 7, revealing the prize card for the car. Instead of restarting the bonus round and editing the tape, the episode aired with this mistake and the contestant was awarded every prize on the board, including the car.

This bonus round is featured in all four editions of the show's home game.

Initially, prizes consisted of cash up to $100 or merchandise. By November 10, 1967, all prizes became merchandise. At some point after that date, a new prize called "Jack's Pot" (named after announcer Jack Clark) was introduced, consisting of a cash prize that was awarded only if it were revealed on the first selection. If this did not happen, its location was revealed right away. The value started at $100 and increased by $100 each day until won.

The third bonus round, known as "The Risk Board", was used for the entire final year of the show's run, from September 2, 1968, to September 26, 1969. Hidden behind spaces 1–3 and 6–8 were five "Go" cards and one "Stop!" sign (spaces in the middle row were not used in this format). Prizes of increasing value were awarded after each "Go" card was found. The contestant could stop at any point but lost all the prizes accumulated if the "Stop!" card was revealed. If all five "Go" cards were revealed without finding the "Stop!" card, the contestant won a new car.

== Attempted revivals ==
=== Punch Lines (1979) ===
In December 1979, a pilot was shot for a revival of Eye Guess and was pitched to local stations by syndicator Metromedia Producers Corporation for the 1980 season. Called Punch Lines and also hosted by Bill Cullen, the premise of the game was for eight comedic performers to hold "punch lines" that would complete statements that the host would read to the two celebrity-contestant teams. As with Eye Guess, the object was to remember where the correct punch line was located. Similar to Match Game and Hollywood Squares, the humor came from the comically mismatched answers and over-the-top line readings given by the performers. Some of the celebrities who were featured in the pilot were Joyce Bulifant, Fred Grandy and Edie McClurg.

Although the show failed to sell in America, it was sold two years later in the U.K. for ITV and had a successful three-year run with Lennie Bennett as its host from January 3, 1981, until December 22, 1984. In addition, Bennett would also host the U.K. adaptation of another Bob Stewart-created game show, Chain Reaction, as Lucky Ladders, running on the same network from March 21, 1988, until May 14, 1993.

Two years later, a pilot for an Australian adaptation of the show, hosted by Jeremy Kewley, was shot for the Seven Network on August 20, 1986. However, like its American counterpart, the series failed to sell.

=== Syndicast Services (1983) ===
In early 1983, Bob Stewart Productions entered into a partnership with Dick Clark Productions (a production company owned by the host of Pyramid, Dick Clark) and Syndicast Services to develop a 90-minute game show block consisting of revivals of old Stewart properties Eye Guess, Three on a Match and Chain Reaction, and attempted to delay to 1984-1985, but none of which got into the ground. Nipsey Russell was slated to host the new version of Eye Guess.

=== Eye Q (1988) ===
Another pilot was shot for a revival of Eye Guess at CBS Television City in August 1988. Called Eye Q and hosted by Henry Polic II, the premise of the game was slightly different. Two couples played against each other, but instead of being shown the answers at the beginning of the game, they were revealed as the game progressed. This made the game more like Concentration, for instead of simply recalling where an answer was based on what was revealed at the beginning of the round, the couples had to remember where the answer was after it was revealed.

The winning couple won $500 and a chance to win up to $50,000 in a bingo-based bonus game. Sixteen numbers were randomly scrambled before the bonus game, and the result of the scramble was hidden behind the winning team. They had a choice of eight of the numbers, and the object was to form a vertical, horizontal or diagonal line. On completing a line, the couple won a cash jackpot, which, on the pilot, had reached $11,000. If the line was completed with the first four numbers that the couple chose, they won $50,000.

This version was slated for a syndication property by Palladium Entertainment to pair it with Jackpot!, but only the latter got a chance to air.

== Home version ==
Milton Bradley issued four editions of the board game during the show's run. The first three feature Bill Cullen's likeness on the boxes.
