= Blankety Blanks (American game show) =

1975 American TV game show

- Created by: Bob Stewart
- Presented by: Bill Cullen
- Announcer: Bob Clayton
- Country of origin: United States
- No. of episodes: 50

Production
- Running time: 30 Minutes
- Production company: Bob Stewart Productions

Original release
- Network: ABC
- Release: April 21 – June 27, 1975

Blankety Blanks is an American game show that aired on ABC from April 21 to June 27, 1975. This Bob Stewart Production starred Bill Cullen as its host with Bob Clayton announcing.

== Gameplay ==
Two teams, composed of a celebrity and a contestant, attempted to solve puzzles and fill in "Blankety Blanks" in the form of puns. For example, the Blankety Blank response to "When Richard Nixon spilled coffee on Gerald Ford's lap, he said ____ ____" would be "Pardon Me!"

At the start of each game, a category and keywords within a puzzle was revealed. The puzzle had numbers 1–6 that each hid a clue to that puzzle, with each clue being one half of a statement. Cullen then pulled out a card from a rotating wheel of 100 situated next to him and placed it into an electronic reader, which chose at random one of the four players and a point value from 100–1000 in 10-point increments.

The chosen player (either the contestant or the celebrity) picked a number and the associated clue was revealed. Unlike some celebrity-civilian games of the period, the celebrity or contestant could not assist his or her partner playing at the moment. A correct answer won the team the designated money amount, but an incorrect answer or no answer at all resulted in the game continuing, with Cullen selecting another card.

Play continued until the puzzle was solved, at which point the team who solved the puzzle attempted to turn the points into money by solving the Blankety Blank. In this part of the game, the celebrity and the contestant were allowed to work together. Each correct Blankety Blank solve gave the opposing team a strike, with three strikes eliminating a contestant from the game. If a team failed to solve the Blankety Blank, no strikes were given and the point value in-play was held until that team solved another puzzle.

Starting with the fourth week, the number of cards in the rotating wheel was reduced to 60, the point values ranged from 100–750 (later 100-500), and any points earned from solving a puzzle accumulated in a team's bank. Solving a Blankety Blank doubled the points in the team's bank. The first team to reach $2,500 (later $2,000) won the championship and kept his or her winnings. Because the last episode ended before either team could reach the goal of $2,000, the player in the lead kept her cash for that game.

== Broadcast history ==
The $10,000 Pyramid's success on ABC's daytime schedule since May 6, 1974 prompted the network to order another show from packager Stewart. Blanks replaced reruns of The Brady Bunch at 11:30 AM (10:30 Central), opposite the top-rated Hollywood Squares on NBC and the soap opera Love of Life on CBS. In an unusual move, when ABC cancelled Blanks, Brady Bunch returned to that timeslot in preparation for its eventual huge success in syndication later that year.

Cullen himself was quoted in a magazine saying that this show "didn't get a fair shake". Most daytime games of that era normally were given a thirteen-week minimum run to prove themselves; Blanks had such low ratings that ABC pulled it after only ten weeks. The fact that it was too similar to Match Game, a popular CBS game show, did not help matters either. (Such were the similarities that international versions of Match Game used the Blankety Blank(s) title, including in the UK and Australia.)

== Theme ==
The theme to this show was later used on another Bob Stewart show, Double Talk, via a practice known in the trade as "recycling". In addition, the theme used for the show's 1975 pilot, “Sports Page” by Keith Roberts, was later re-used on an unsold 1977 Stewart pilot, Get Rich Quick. Bob Cobert composed the theme.

== Episode status ==
The series is believed to have been destroyed as per network practices of the era (ABC, specifically, continued this practice until 1978). Only the pilot (taped February 10 with Anita Gillette and Soupy Sales) and Premiere (taped April 4 with Anne Meara and William Shatner) are known to exist.
