= Personality (game show) =

- Genre: Game Show
- Created by: Bob Stewart
- Presented by: Larry Blyden
- Announcer: Bill Wendell
- Theme music composer: Herb Alpert (original theme); Bob Cobert (second theme)
- Country of origin: United States
- Original language: English
- No. of episodes: 571

Original release
- Network: NBC
- Release: July 3, 1967 – September 26, 1969

Personality is an American game show produced by Bob Stewart and hosted by Larry Blyden which ran on NBC from July 3, 1967, to September 26, 1969, at 11:00 AM, EST. The series was produced by Filmways. Bill Wendell, then on the NBC staff, announced the show.

== Game play ==
A panel of three celebrities, each playing for a member of the studio audience or home viewer, tried to predict how other celebrities answered a series of questions asked in pre-recorded interviews.

=== Round 1 ===
In the first round, two of the panelists were given three possible responses for each question asked to the third and after they chose, the correct answer was shown.

=== Round 2 ===
In the second round, each celebrity panelist had to guess how a series of people responded to questions related to the celebrity.

=== Round 3 ===
In the final round, each celebrity panelist had to guess how a different celebrity answered questions.

Each correct answer was worth $25 for the person they were playing for. The panelist with the most money at the end of the game won a vacation for his/her audience/home viewer partner.

== Music ==
The show's original theme was "Struttin' with Maria" by Herb Alpert, while the second was composed by Bob Cobert. The second theme was later used for Stewart's Three on a Match.

== Episode status ==
The series is believed to be wiped, as per network practices of the era, with only three episodes known to exist – #437 (March 4, 1969) and #542 (July 29, 1969). GSN has aired the latter several times, although it also circulates among private collectors as a studio master with production slate. Another episode from the same week as #542 has recently been discovered and uploaded to YouTube.
