= Bob Clayton =

American television host/announcer (1922–1979)

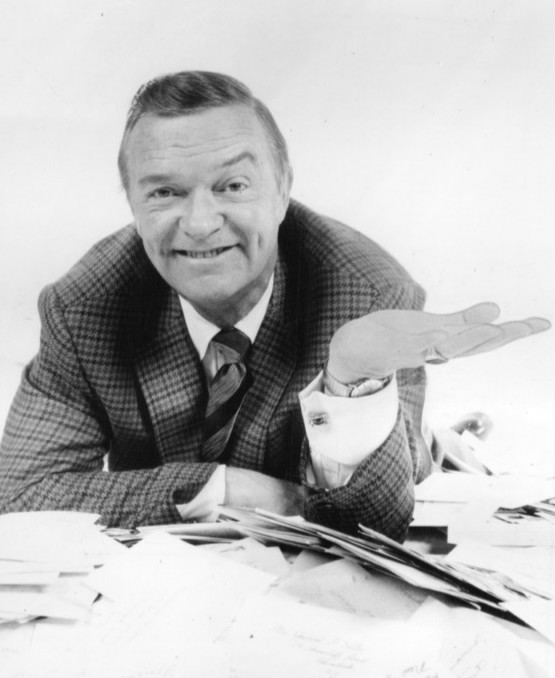
- Clayton as the host of Concentration in 1971.
- Born: James Robert Box; August 17, 1922; Atlanta, Georgia, U.S.
- Died: November 1, 1979 (aged 57); New York City, U.S.
- Occupations: Announcer, game show host

Bob Clayton (born James Robert Box; August 17, 1922 – November 1, 1979) was an American television game show announcer and host of several shows. He spent his early television career hosting shows in Miami, Florida before moving to New York in the 1960s.

== Career ==
A native of Atlanta, Georgia, Clayton became a vaudeville singer at age 15. He served in the Army as a combat engineer during World War II and was an announcer for the Armed Forces Radio Network after the war. He graduated from Georgia Tech and studied drama in New York City.

In 1948, Clayton joined the staff of WWDX-FM in Paterson, New Jersey, as an announcer.

In Miami, he was a staff announcer on WCKT (channel 7) and hosted a kiddie show called Bobsville.

After his first national hosting job on the game Make a Face (ABC, 1961–1962), Clayton assumed announcing duties on the long-running NBC game Concentration in 1963, and took over hosting duties on the show in January 1969 as successor to original emcee Hugh Downs. He was replaced in March 1969 by Ed McMahon, but returned in September 1969 after viewer outrage and declining audience ratings.

Clayton also had a brief flirtation with the movies when he played the bell captain in Jerry Lewis' 1960 film, The Bellboy, which was shot on location in Miami.

== Later work ==
After the cancellation of Concentration, Clayton served as announcer on several shows created by Bob Stewart, including the Pyramid series of games, beginning with CBS' The $10,000 Pyramid in 1973. Pyramid began airing the Monday after the final episode of Concentration aired, in the same time slot, though on another network. Other Stewart shows he did included Blankety Blanks, Shoot for the Stars and Pass the Buck.

== Personal life ==
He was married to Tahitian dancer Mireille of the Mai-Kai Restaurant in Fort Lauderdale.

== Death ==
On November 1, 1979, Clayton died of cardiac arrest.
