= Silvetti =

Silvetti is an Italian surname. Notable people with the surname include:

- Bebu Silvetti (1944–2003), Argentine musician
- Daniele Silvetti (born 1973), Italian politician
- Jorge Silvetti (born 1942), Argentine architect
- Mateo Silvetti (born 2006), Argentine footballer
