= Double Talk =

American television game show

- Also known as: Celebrity Double Talk
- Genre: Game show
- Created by: Bob Stewart
- Presented by: Henry Polic II
- Announcer: Bob Hilton; Johnny Gilbert
- Music by: Bob Cobert
- Country of origin: United States
- No. of episodes: 90

Production
- Running time: 22 minutes

Original release
- Network: ABC
- Release: August 18 – December 19, 1986

Double Talk is an American game show that aired on the ABC network from August 18 to December 19, 1986. The show was a Bob Stewart-produced word game which borrowed elements from Stewart's previous show Shoot for the Stars and his then-current editions of Pyramid.

Double Talk was hosted by actor and frequent Pyramid panelist Henry Polic II. Bob Hilton announced for the first two weeks, with Johnny Gilbert replacing him for the remaining sixteen.

Near the end of its run, the show was retitled Celebrity Double Talk. However, no format changes took place with the change in the show's title.

== Gameplay ==
=== Main game ===
Two teams, each consisting of a contestant and celebrity competed. The object was for the team to work together and decipher puzzles that are written "in other words" style. For example, "Twice / Speak" translated to "Double Talk", the show's title. The slash represented a break in the puzzle, and each partner had to solve half of the puzzle to score. As noted above, this game play mechanic was borrowed from Shoot For the Stars but slightly modified for Double Talk.

The game board had four hidden puzzles on it, each worth ten points if correctly solved by the team in control. The controlling team could continue to solve puzzles until they solved all four puzzles on the board or made a mistake. If either partner could not solve their half, control passed to the other team, who could score five points and end the round by providing the correct response to the puzzle missed by their opponents. If the second team provided an incorrect response in their attempt to steal, play continued with the original team and any remaining unrevealed puzzles.

Round One ended after both teams played one board. In Round Two, each team again attempted four puzzles on their own board, with correct responses worth twenty points, but still only five points for a steal.

The team with the higher score at the end of Round Two won the game and played the bonus round for $10,000. If both teams were tied at the end of Round Two, the scores were reset to zero and teams attempted to solve a best-of-three puzzles by buzzing-in and responding in the same manner as before. Each puzzle solved correctly was worth ten points; otherwise, those points were awarded to the other team upon buzzing in incorrectly. Whoever scored twenty points first won the game and played the bonus round.

==== Jackpot puzzle ====
For the first week of the series, if a team was able to solve all four puzzles on the board, they were shown a fifth, harder puzzle. If the team solved the puzzle, the contestant won a jackpot that started at $1,000 and increased by that amount each day until won.

==== Format changes ====
Beginning with the second week, teams were only required to solve three of the four puzzles in order to obtain a chance at the Jackpot Puzzle. Hereafter, it was no longer a building jackpot and was worth $1000 regardless of whether anybody won it on the previous episode. Additionally, after stealing a puzzle and winning five points, play continued with the original team until they had played three of the four puzzles on that board. However, missing a puzzle forfeited the chance at the Jackpot Puzzle.

=== Bonus round ===
The bonus round saw the team work to win $10,000 by correctly figuring out the solutions of nine fill-in-the-blank style puzzles. The contestant had a choice of whether to give or receive clues.

The puzzles were displayed on nine of the ten trilons that spelled out the "Double Talk" logo on stage. The first trilon, with the "D", stayed in place and was considered a free space. The receiver saw the blank puzzles while the giver viewed the puzzle solution from an offscreen monitor. Based on the solution, the giver tried to lead the receiver to the correct answer. For example, if a puzzle was displayed as G_____ C_____ and the solution was George Carlin, the giver might say, "The comedian who did the 'Seven Words You Can Never Say on TV' routine was..."

Each time the receiver correctly solved a puzzle, the trilon would flip back to the corresponding letter on the logo board and play continued with the next puzzle. Passing was allowed, with the passed puzzles able to be played again if time permitted. Cluegivers were forbidden from using their hands as well as saying a word in the puzzle or otherwise giving the solution away. Doing so blocked the letter out and cost the team a chance at the $10,000.

The team had sixty seconds to flip over all nine of the remaining letters. Doing so won the contestant the $10,000. If not, the contestant received $100 for each correctly solved puzzle (including for the unused "D" in the logo).

=== Returning champions ===
Two complete games were played each episode, meaning that a player could win up to $20,000 each day in the bonus round plus any jackpot money. Players switched celebrity partners after the first game. The contestant who won more money in the bonus round returned on the next episode. If both players won the same amount of money, both players returned on the next episode to play again. Champions stayed on the show for a maximum of five days or were retired on the day they reached $50,000, whichever came first.

== Broadcast history ==
ABC had largely abandoned the game show genre by the time Double Talk debuted; the network had dropped its hour-long game show block at the end of 1985 and had not aired any game shows at all for four months before Double Talk's premiere. Debuting on August 18, 1986, Double Talk struggled in the ratings against the second half of The Price Is Right on CBS and Scrabble on NBC and failed to find an audience. The series ended its run on December 19, 1986, four months and a day after its debut. It was the last Bob Stewart-produced game show to run on ABC. It was replaced with another new game show, Bargain Hunters, in the summer of 1987.
