= You're Putting Me On =

- Created by: Bob Stewart
- Country of origin: United States

Production
- Running time: 30 minutes

Original release
- Network: NBC
- Release: June 30 – December 26, 1969

You're Putting Me On! is an NBC game show in which celebrities tried to communicate the identities of famous people through odd and interesting clues. Bill Leyden was the original host, with Larry Blyden taking over halfway through the run. The program was broadcast from June 30 to December 26, 1969, at 1:30 pm.

== Gameplay ==
Three teams, composed of a "regular" celebrity and a guest celebrity, were each given 100 points to start the game. Each team played for a member of the studio audience.

In each round, Leyden began by listing four famous people as possible answers. One member of each team was given a card with one of those famous people on it, and that player would have to assume the identity of that famous person (more than one team could have the same famous person). In other words, they would be "putting on" a different identity.

Leyden would then ask a bizarre or amusing question to each clue giver, who would answer in character to hint at their secret identity. For example, if a celebrity was given the identity of Robert Goulet and was asked, "If you were to have a human transplant, what part of your body would be transplanted?", a good clue would be to deepen their voice and answer, "My larynx." Or, if the celebrity was given the identity of Soupy Sales and asked "If you were a billboard, what would be on you?", they could use wordplay by saying, "A little boy and girl sitting next to a shiny aluminum can" (alluding to a "soup" can).

In the first part of each round, Leyden posed two questions to each clue giver. Then, based on their confidence, the clue giver's partner could bet up to half of their points on one of the four possibilities. In the second part of each round, the partners switched roles, this time only one question being played. Again, up to half the team's points could be bet.

Before the final question in each round, Leyden informed one of the three teams that getting the next question correct would win the chance to play "Bonus Characters". In Bonus Characters, a deck of cards with various famous people or characters on them was placed between the teammates. They alternated taking a card and trying to communicate that person's identity using any means necessary (except names). The team had 45 seconds to give as many answers as possible, each one adding 20 points to the team's final score. A different team had the chance to play each round.

After three rounds, the team with the highest total won $500, second place $250, and last place nothing.

== Hosts ==
Bill Leyden was the original host, with Larry Blyden, Bill Cullen and Peggy Cass as regular panelists. Blyden took over as host after Leyden relinquished his duties in September 1969. Although the official reason given for Leyden leaving the show was because its "production schedule caused him to have to commute weekly between his Los Angeles home and New York", in reality, Leyden had suffered a cerebral hemorrhage which would ultimately claim his life several months later. The pilot was hosted by actor Ron Husmann.

== Broadcast history ==
This program was one of several shows which NBC attempted to program in the 1:30–2:30 slot against ABC's Let's Make a Deal (which began its run on NBC) and CBS' As the World Turns between 1968 and 1975. As with almost all of them, You're Putting Me On was a distant third in the ratings and lasted only six months. Its predecessor was the soap opera Hidden Faces, and the replacement program was a comeback attempt by Art Linkletter that also included his son Jack. Two years later, another of Stewart's programs, Three on a Match, was shown in the time slot for three years.

== Episode status ==
The show is considered to be lost. A few episodes are held by the UCLA Film & Television Archive.
