= The Love Experts =

American television show (1978–1979)

- Created by: Bob Stewart
- Directed by: Mike Gargiulo; Bruce Burmester
- Presented by: Bill Cullen
- Announcer: Jack Clark; Jay Stewart
- Music by: Bebu Silvetti
- Country of origin: United States

Production
- Producer: Anne-Marie Schmidt
- Running time: 23 minutes
- Production company: Bob Stewart Productions

Original release
- Network: Syndication
- Release: September 18, 1978 – September 7, 1979

The Love Experts is an American television show that was a part talk, part game show. It aired from September 18, 1978, to September 7, 1979 and was hosted by Bill Cullen with Jack Clark as the announcer. The show was created by Bob Stewart. Bebu Silvetti's "Spring Rain" was used as the show's theme song.

== Premise ==
Three guests would appear and talk about their love lives. After each guest had told his or her story, a panel of four celebrities would give advice to the contestant.

=== Decision ===
After the guests had told their stories, the celebrity panel would choose which of the three contestants had given the most interesting story and that particular contestant would win a prize.

Among the celebrities who appeared as panelists were David Letterman, Elaine Joyce, Jo Anne Worley, Anita Gillette, Geoff Edwards, Soupy Sales, Nipsey Russell, Jamie Lee Curtis, Jay Johnson and Billy Crystal.

== Music ==
The theme song was "Spring Rain" by Bebu Silvetti.

== Broadcast history ==
The Love Experts began on September 18, 1978, as a unique syndicated attempt – a talk show with a small game element added in. The series was somewhat of a precursor to the long-running Love Connection, though focused on one person at a time.
