= Shoot for the Stars =

Television game show series

- Genre: Game show
- Created by: Bob Stewart
- Directed by: Mike Gargiulo
- Presented by: Geoff Edwards
- Narrated by: Bob Clayton
- Music by: Bob Cobert
- Country of origin: United States
- No. of episodes: 195

Production
- Producer: Bob Stewart
- Production locations: NBC Studios; Ed Sullivan Theater; New York, New York
- Running time: 22 Minutes
- Production company: Bob Stewart Productions

Original release
- Network: NBC
- Release: January 3 – September 30, 1977

Shoot for the Stars is a game show created and produced by Bob Stewart, and aired on the NBC television network. The show aired from January 3 to September 30, 1977, and was produced in New York City. During most of its run, it videotaped at NBC's headquarters in Rockefeller Center, but some weeks of episodes were recorded at Studio 50 at CBS, also known as the Ed Sullivan Theater. Shoot for the Stars was the last NBC game show to originate from New York City.

The theme song, performed by Bob Cobert, was later reused on the two 1980s versions of Jackpot.

== Game play ==
Two teams competed, each consisting of a civilian contestant and a celebrity. The game board consisted of 24 numbered boxes. Hidden behind these numbers were money values ranging from $100 to $300, one $500 value, one "Double Your Score" card, four stars, an "Instant Win" card and an "Instant Car" card.

Both teams began with $100 and took turns playing, starting with the challengers. During each turn, the team in control chose a box, whose contents were revealed, and then tried to decipher an awkward phrase. For example, the phrase "Infant mug / Ozzie or Harriet" led to "Baby Face Nelson." The two halves of the phrase were separated by a line; the contestant could answer only the first part, and the celebrity could answer only the second. A correct answer rewarded the team as follows:

- Money amount: Added to the team's total.
- Double your score: Immediately doubled the team's total.
- Star: The team decided how much of their total they wanted to wager on the phrase, up to and including all of it. A correct answer added the value of the wager, while a miss deducted it.
- Instant car: Awarded the contestant a new car.

An incorrect response carried no penalty, except when a star was in play.

The first team to accumulate $1,500 or more won the game. If the challengers reached this goal first in proper turn, the champions were not given a chance to catch up. The winning contestant received exactly $1,500, while the losing contestant received parting gifts and kept any money or bonus prizes won in previous games.

=== Bonus round ===
The winning team hit a plunger to stop a display showing a random number between five and nine (originally between four and eight), which determined the number of correct answers needed in 60 seconds to win the round.

One team member was shown a two-word phrase and had to get their partner to guess it by describing each word separately. If the team gave the required number of answers before time ran out, the contestant won a cash jackpot that began at $1,000 and increased by $500 after every unsuccessful attempt.

Any contestant who made five attempts at the bonus round received a new car and retired from the show.

== Broadcast history ==
NBC first slotted Shoot for the Stars at 11:30 AM (10:30 Central), replacing the Allen Ludden-hosted Stumpers. It faced Happy Days reruns on ABC and Love of Life on CBS until April 25, when ABC placed Family Feud in that slot, thus the show begins to decline.

The show's initial working title was Shoot the Works, which was the title for the unaired pilot, but it was changed at the last minute before airing.

On June 13, NBC moved Shoot for the Stars to 12:00 Noon (11:00 AM, Central), where the series promptly sank against CBS' hit soap opera The Young and the Restless, but also faced two short run ABC shows Second Chance and The Better Sex.
