= Bill Cullen =

American radio and television personality (1920–1990)

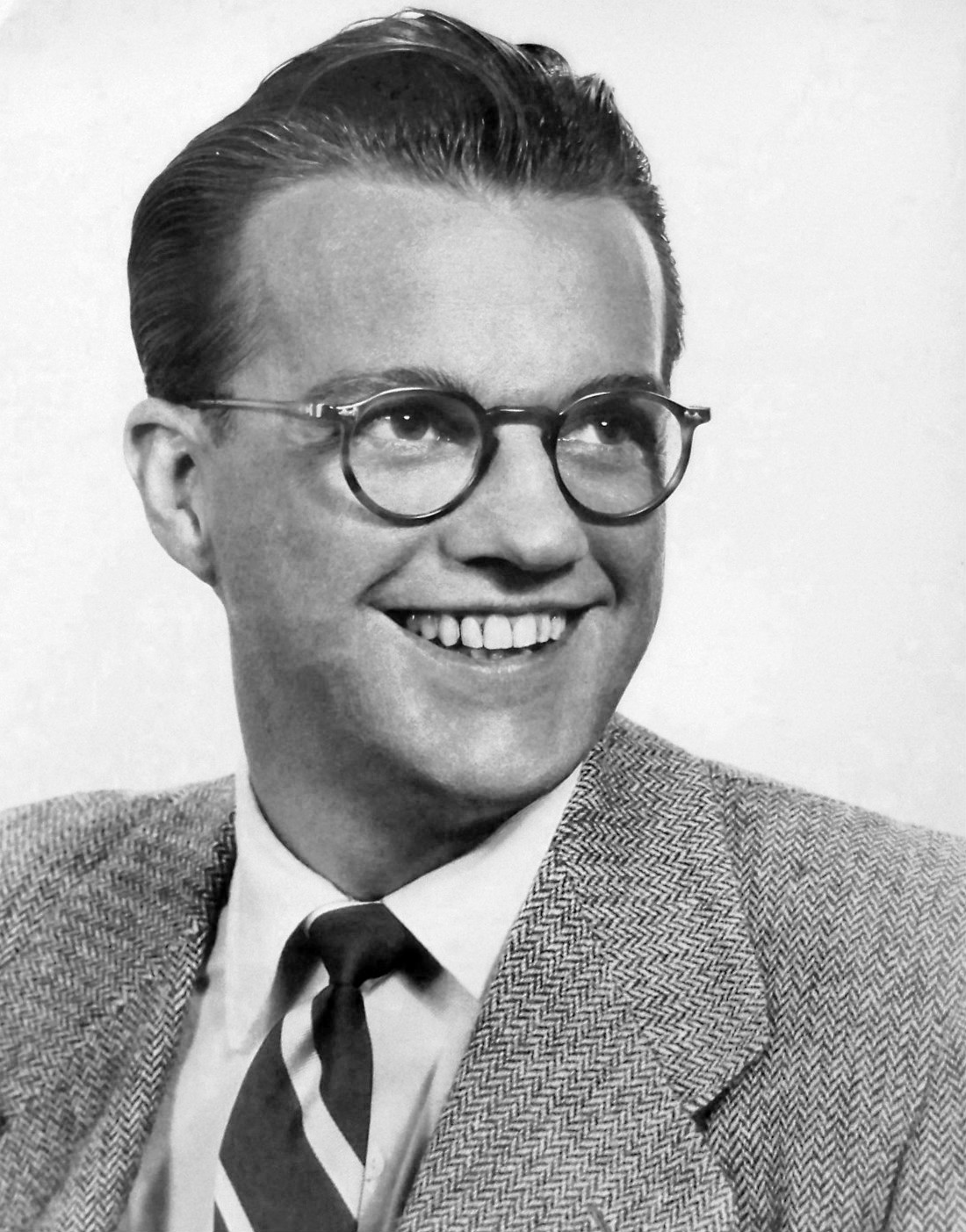
- Cullen in 1954
- Born: William Lawrence Frances Cullen; February 18, 1920; Pittsburgh, Pennsylvania, U.S.
- Died: July 7, 1990 (aged 70); Bel Air, California, U.S.
- Education: University of Pittsburgh
- Occupations: Television personality Radio announcer Game show host
- Years active: 1939–1988
- Known for: Original host of The Price Is Right
- Spouses: Ruth Ellen Harrington (m. 1943; div. 1948); Carol Ames (m. 1948; div. 1955); Ann Roemheld Macomber (m. 1955)

William Lawrence Frances Cullen (February 18, 1920 – July 7, 1990) was an American radio and television personality whose career spanned five decades. Known for appearing on game shows and later as a prolific game show host, he hosted 23 shows, earning the nickname "Dean of Game Show Hosts". Aside from his hosting duties, he appeared as a panelist/celebrity guest on many other game shows, including regular appearances on I've Got a Secret and To Tell the Truth.

== Early life ==
Cullen was born in Pittsburgh, Pennsylvania, the only child of William and Lillian Cullen. His father was a Ford dealer in Pittsburgh.

He survived a childhood bout with polio that left him with significant physical limitations for the rest of his life. Cullen was a pre-med student at the University of Pittsburgh, but had to withdraw because of financial problems. After he achieved some success in radio, he returned to the university and earned a bachelor's degree.

== Radio ==
Cullen's broadcasting career began in 1939 in Pittsburgh at WWSW radio, where he worked as a disc jockey and play-by-play announcer or color commentator for Pittsburgh Steelers (NFL) and Pittsburgh Hornets (minor league hockey) games. In 1943, Cullen left WWSW for a brief job at rival station KDKA before leaving Pittsburgh a year later to try his luck in New York. A week after arriving in New York, he was hired as a staff announcer at CBS.

To supplement his then-meager income, he became a freelance joke writer for some of the top radio stars of the day, including Arthur Godfrey, Danny Kaye, and Jack Benny; he also worked as a staff writer for the Easy Aces radio show.

His first venture into game shows was in 1945, when he was hired as announcer for a radio quiz called Give And Take. In the summer of 1950, he was quizmaster on Hit the Jackpot, the summer replacement for Amos 'n' Andy on CBS radio. After a brief stint at WNEW in 1951, he hosted a popular morning show at WNBC radio from 1955 to 1961.

== Military service ==
Cullen was a pilot for the United States Army Air Forces in World War II. Cullen served in the Civil Air Patrol as an instructor and patrol aircraft pilot in his native Pennsylvania during World War II (having failed to qualify for combat duty due to his physical disabilities), and was interested in mechanics.

== TV career ==
Cullen's first television game show was the TV version of Winner Take All, which premiered on NBC in 1952. In 1953, Cullen had The Bill Cullen Show, a weekly morning variety program on CBS. He hosted Bank on the Stars in 1954. From 1954 to 1955, he hosted NBC's Place the Face, a program in which celebrities identified people from their past; he simultaneously hosted CBS's Name That Tune. From 1956 to 1965, he hosted the initial daytime and primetime versions of The Price Is Right, another Goodson-Todman production. He was also a panelist on I've Got a Secret from 1952 to 1967, and To Tell the Truth from 1969 to 1978, where he also guest-hosted on occasion. After relocating to Southern California, Cullen guest-hosted Password Plus for four weeks in April 1980 while original host Allen Ludden was being treated for stomach cancer.

Cullen was initially in the running to host the 1972 revival of The Price Is Right, but he ultimately chose to stay in New York. Consequently, when CBS picked up the daytime version, Bob Barker was selected to host the daytime version while Dennis James (who sold the pilot with Mark Goodson) hosted the syndicated nighttime version. Barker remained the show's daytime host until his retirement in 2007. Occasional references to Cullen have been made by current The Price Is Right host Drew Carey.

Other game shows Cullen hosted included Eye Guess in the 1960s; Three on a Match, Blankety Blanks, The Love Experts, How Do You Like Your Eggs? (QUBE cable interactive program) and the syndicated version of The $25,000 Pyramid in the 1970s; and later in his career Chain Reaction, Blockbusters, Child's Play, Hot Potato and The Joker's Wild (his final hosting job from 1984 to 1986, following the death of Jack Barry).

In a 1984 TV Guide article, Cullen commented on the ease with which he seemed to land his hosting jobs:

"This is how it happens every time," says Cullen. "A known packager comes up with the idea for a new show. The network says, do a run-through. They do. The network likes it, and they say, we'll give you a pilot. Then the network says, Who are we going to get to host it?

Packager: Who do you have in mind?

Network: Let's go with someone new.

Packager: Great idea. Who?

Network: Don't you know anybody?

Packager: No. There's so-and-so, but we tried him in a run-through and he didn't work out ... How about you? You know someone?

Network: No.

Now, the sets are constructed, the game is worked out, the staff is hired, it's two weeks before the show is to go on, they are ready to shoot the pilot.

Network: Well, have you thought of anybody yet?

Packager: No.

Network: Let's go with Bill Cullen.

That's almost exactly how NBC picked the host of Hot Potato."

Cullen appeared as a celebrity guest on many other game shows, including I've Got a Secret, What's My Line?, To Tell the Truth, Personality, The Cross-Wits, Password, Password Plus, Match Game, Tattletales (with his wife Ann), Break the Bank, Shoot for the Stars, and all of the versions of Pyramid (excluding the $50,000 and $100,000 versions). Cullen hosted a number of pilots for his close friend, quiz producer Bob Stewart, who created The Price Is Right, Truth, and Password for Goodson-Todman and Pyramid for his own company. Cullen thus became the only person to host each of these formats on a full- or part-time basis. He also appeared as a panelist on game shows hosted by his favorite understudy, Bob Eubanks, including Trivia Trap, Rhyme and Reason, and All Star Secrets, and he made guest appearances with Eubanks on Family Feud.

In 1982, Cullen made an appearance on The Price Is Right to promote his new game show, Child's Play. It was the only time he ever appeared on the revival of The Price Is Right, but no mention was made of his role as the show's original host.

== Achievements ==
Cullen did color commentary on college football games early in his career, and also broadcast track and field on NBC. On I've Got A Secret, producers Mark Goodson and Bill Todman and host Garry Moore quickly learned to never start the questioning with Cullen if the guest's secret was anything sports-related or mechanical, because chances were good that he would guess it immediately.

During his television career, Cullen was nominated three times for Emmy Awards; his only win was a Primetime Emmy for hosting Three on a Match (1973). He was later nominated for Daytime Emmys for his work on Blockbusters (1982) and Hot Potato (1985).

Throughout his entire career in radio and television, Cullen hosted more than 25,000 individual episodes of radio and television shows. With over 20 unique game shows to his credit (a milestone matched only by Wink Martindale), Cullen hosted more unique game show formats than any other host.

== Personal life ==
=== Marriages ===
Cullen was married three times and had no children. His first marriage was a brief one while still living in Pittsburgh. His second marriage (1948–1955) was to singer Carol Ames. On December 24, 1955, Cullen married former dancer and model Ann Roemheld Macomber, born Elise Ann Roemheld (whose sister was, at the time, married to game show announcer and future emcee Jack Narz), the daughter of composer Heinz Roemheld; this marriage lasted until his death in 1990. She occasionally worked as a model on Bill's The Price Is Right and made several appearances with him on Tattletales. She died on July 21, 2018, aged 90.

=== Physical disability ===
Cullen contracted polio in August 1921, when he was 18 months old. The long-term effects of that illness, combined with injuries sustained in a serious motor vehicle accident in 1937 requiring a nine-month hospitalization, made it difficult for him to walk or stand for an extended period of time.

Directors on his game shows took great care to limit the extent that Cullen was shown walking on camera. Each show's set was designed to accommodate Cullen's limited range of motion; the podiums, game boards, props, and any physical movements by contestants were arranged so that Cullen could, for the most part, remain stationary. Rather than making an elaborate entrance like most game show hosts, Cullen began each show either already seated or hidden on set behind a prop just a few steps from his podium. Similar accommodations were made when he appeared as a guest on other game shows.

As a consequence of these arrangements, many of Cullen's peers were likewise unaware of his disability, which occasionally led to awkward situations. In the August 2010 issue of GQ under the heading "Epic Tales of Embarrassment", Mel Brooks related the following story to writer Steve Heisler:

The week of October 17–21 in 1966—that would make me about 40—was a special celebrity week on Eye Guess. Bill Cullen was the host. The game was very similar to Concentration. I was teamed up with Julia Meade. Remember her? Actress, very pretty young lady, blonde... Okay, never mind. I don't think I won, but I did get the take-home game. Anyway, the show is over, and I start walking toward the podium to say good night to Bill, to thank him for having me on. He starts coming toward me cross-stage, and I don't know what he's doing. His feet are flopping. His hands are flying everywhere. He's doing this kind of wacky walk-of-the-unfortunates that Jerry Lewis used to do. So I figured, what the hell, I'll join him. I start doing, I dunno, this multiple-sclerosis walk, flapping my arms and doing the Milton Berle cross legs—my own Jerry Lewis impression... And Julia is whispering, "No! He's crippled, Mel!" I don't even hear her. Finally we meet in the middle, we hug, and he says to me, "You know, you're the only comic who's ever had the nerve to make fun of my crippled walk. Everyone's so careful, it makes me feel even worse." And I realize, Oh, my God, this guy is really crippled! It was my worst moment — and if you weren't me, probably the funniest thing that ever happened.

In the fall of 1969, shortly after Eye Guess ended, Cullen fell seriously ill. Diagnosed with pancreatitis and requiring major surgery, Cullen took time off from work to recuperate. When he returned to television, particularly his position on the panel for To Tell The Truth, his physical appearance had drastically changed; along with letting his hair grow out, his pancreatitis had caused him to lose over 30 pounds (14 kg), leaving his face gaunt and wrinkled.

=== Hobbies ===
Cullen was a midget-car racer, and he was a member of the United States Civil Air Patrol.

== Death ==
Cullen was a heavy smoker, and died of lung cancer in 1990 at the age of 70. His widow, Ann Romeheld Macomber, died on July 21, 2018, at the age of 90.
