= Maiquel Alejo =

Television personality

Maiquel Alejo (née Suarez) is a television game show hostess best known as the co-hostess of the California Lottery's first game show The Big Spin from 1993 to 2009. She was joined by various hosts including Geoff Edwards, Larry Anderson, Jack Gallagher and Pat Finn during her 16 years until the show ended its run on January 10, 2009.

In addition to her hosting duties on The Big Spin, she helped contestants who spoke only Spanish during interviews with her co-hosts when an interpreter was needed as she is fluent in Spanish.

She was married in 1997 and, away from the show, she spends time with her husband and her four children. She is also an actress.
