= Action Réaction =

- Created by: Bob Stewart
- Presented by: Pierre Lalonde
- Music by: Larry Owens
- Country of origin: Canada

Production
- Production locations: CFCF-TV Studios; Montreal, Quebec
- Running time: 30 Minutes
- Production company: Bob and Sande Stewart Productions

Original release
- Network: TQS
- Release: September 8, 1986 – June 1, 1990

Action Réaction (Action Reaction) is a French Canadian game show, an adaptation of the Bob Stewart Productions game show Chain Reaction, in which players compete to form chains composed of two-word phrases. It aired on TQS from 1986 to 1990, with Pierre Lalonde as host, and recorded at CFCF in Montreal, concurrent to the English version broadcast on Global Television Network and USA Network recorded at CFCF with Blake Emmons (later replaced by Geoff Edwards) as hosts. Unlike its English language version, which used the Bob Cobert theme from the 1980 NBC version in the United States, the theme was "Sunset Boulevard" from Larry Owens. Originally, Lalonde was to have hosted both the English and French language versions, but because of original plans for syndication, was later replaced by Edwards on the English version after Emmons did not want to commute from California to Quebec.

== Main game ==
Two teams of two players (one civilian and one celebrity, unlike its English-language counterpart, which used two civilians), faced a seven word chain. Each team member was given a responsibility. One teammate was the letter giver, and decided whether to give a letter to his or her partner or to other team's word guesser. A correct response was worth points and control of the board. In Round One, each word guessed was worth 10 points, but the final word guessed in that chain was worth 20 (changed to 15 in season two). In Round Two, these values escalated to 20 points each, and 40 points for the final word. values for Round Three were again increased to 30 points each, and 60 for the final word. Two hundred points won the game. If necessary, the fourth chain point values were 40 points per word and 80 for the final word.

== Bonus chain ==
The winning team could collect a cash jackpot by completing one last word chain. The team was shown the first word in a chain, and the initial letter of the other words. One at a time, the players would guess at the next word in the chain. For each wrong guess, the next letter would be filled in, and a letter would be deducted from their account which started at seven (nine at first). If the team could finish the chain before running out of letters, the civilian would win the cash jackpot. If not, he/she won $100 per correct answer. Unlike its English-language counterpart, the jackpot began at CA$1,000; and $500 was added each day it was not claimed. (The English language version, hosted by Geoff Edwards and Rod Charlebois, offered CA$3,000) with $1,000 added.)

Champions remained on the show until they were defeated or held their title for five consecutive days.
