= The Big Spin =

Lottery game show for the state of California

- Genre: Game show
- Created by: Fred Tatashore
- Presented by: Chuck Woolery; Geoff Edwards; Larry Anderson; Jack Gallagher; Pat Finn with Maiquel Alejo
- Announcer: Charlie O'Donnell; Rich Hardaway; Jackie Taylor; Randy West
- Country of origin: United States
- No. of seasons: 24
- No. of episodes: 1,213

Production
- Executive producer: Jonathan Goodson
- Running time: 21 Minutes (without commercials)
- Production companies: Fred Tatashore Productions (1985-1991); Alexander Media Services (1985-1991); Cal Image (1991-1999); Jonathan Goodson Productions (1999-2009)

Original release
- Network: Syndicated (weekly, California only)
- Release: October 28, 1985 – January 10, 2009

The Big Spin is the California Lottery's first television game show.

It ended with a fixed top prize of $3 million and a minimum guaranteed cash prize of $1,750. The total cash and prizes given in 2007 came out to $17,872,500, the most money given away in a game show that year, therefore being "the biggest money game show on Earth" as its introduction stated.

Originally, the show was taped in Hollywood, California at Hollywood Center Studios. From 1986 to 1998, the show was taped in Sacramento; Mike Side hosted a short time when the show was done at the KTXL studios in Sacramento, the state capital as well as headquarters of the lottery. From 1999 until the end of its run, the show was taped in Hollywood at KCET Studios.

The Big Spin ended as the second longest-running lottery game show on January 10, 2009, over 23 years since its first broadcast in October 1985; it was replaced with Make Me a Millionaire on January 17.

== Hosts ==
The show debuted October 28, 1985, with Chuck Woolery as host and Charlie O'Donnell as the announcer. The two previously worked together on Wheel of Fortune. Only three weeks later, however, Woolery left the program after its November 18 broadcast to concentrate on hosting Scrabble and Love Connection. On November 25, Woolery was succeeded by Geoff Edwards, who soon hosted the Canadian-produced Chain Reaction, requiring him to commute between the two countries. Edwards hosted the show until December 24, 1994.

For a six-week period after Edwards left, various guest hosts were used in what were on-air auditions for a permanent job. Among those who did so were former Match Game host Ross Shafer, comedian (and That's My Dog host) Wil Shriner, and Peter Tomarken of Press Your Luck. In addition, future hosts Larry Anderson and Jack Gallagher each hosted an episode.

On February 11, 1995, Anderson (who also hosted the 1980s version of Truth or Consequences) took over as the show's host. On September 14, 1996, he was replaced by Gallagher, who remained with the show until March 6, 1999.

On March 13, 1999, Pat Finn took over the show, which was briefly retitled Big Spin 2000 to herald the new millennium. During Finn's reign as host, an award honoring a "Hero In Education" was presented each month by a celebrity guest. The California Lottery has donated over $20 billion to state public schools since its inception in 1985.

=== Other talent ===
By 1991, there were so many Spanish-speaking contestants on the show that Maiquel Alejo (known as Maiquel Suarez until 1997) was brought in as co-host, in addition to serving as a translator for Spanish-speaking contestants.

The announcer for at least the first three months was Charlie O'Donnell, then Rich Hardaway until 1999, followed by Jackie Taylor from 1999 to 2003 (who also filled in for Alejo as co-host during her 2001 maternity leave).

Veteran game show announcer Randy West joined in 2004 and was the show's final on-camera personnel change prior to its cancellation.

== Getting on the show ==
When the California Lottery first started, there was only one kind of scratcher ticket. All participants who won a $100 prize sent in their tickets to participate in a random draw; one out of every 2,000 tickets sent in was selected, and the participant qualified for The Big Spin. (In the earliest days, there were 20 spins per week, not all of which were televised.) Later, instead of the $100 winners qualifying for the draw, qualifying tickets had their own symbol; as more of these tickets were printed, the chance of qualifying for the draw became 1 in 4,000. During a point in the Geoff Edwards run, a bonus drawing was also featured, in which a winning scratch-off ticket was drawn at random, and the person who mailed it in won a car.

Ultimately, for participation in Aces High or the Big Wheel, the lottery produced a Big Spin scratcher. This scratcher has numerous dollar amounts from $1 to $500. There are also TV SHOW, SPIN, and TICKET spaces. Matching three of a given word or amount wins the specified prize. TV SHOW scratcher winners went to the 10-person elimination rounds, while SPIN scratcher winners went right up to the Big Wheel, usually at the end of the show.

Although the show ended with its last broadcast on January 10, 2009, replaced the following week by Make Me a Millionaire, Big Spin Scratchers remained in circulation for a few months. During that time, winners who would have gone to The Big Spin had a choice: become a contestant on Make Me a Millionaire, or spin the wheel or play Aces High on an untelevised Big Spin episode.

A player who bought a $5 Fantasy 5 ticket got a coupon to mail in for a "second-chance" draw. Winners of this random draw originally played the Fantasy 5 Dream Machine on The Big Spin, but later became contestants on Make Me a Millionaire.

== Games ==
=== The Big Wheel ===
The player spun a vertically mounted carnival wheel divided into 100 spaces, with pegs mounted around its circumference. The wheel did not have a flipper or pointer to slow it down, in contrast to those used on shows such as The Price Is Right and Wheel of Fortune. A ball bounced among the pegs, and the outcome of the spin was determined by the first space in which it came to rest for a minimum of five seconds. The wheel had to make at least three full revolutions in order for the spin to be considered valid.

When the series started, the wheel was made up of 40 $10,000 spaces, 30 $50,000 spaces, 20 $100,000 spaces, and 10 $2-million spaces. When Geoff Edwards took over, the $2-million spaces were replaced by five $1-million and five $3-million spaces. Later still, the $3-million spaces were replaced by a sixth $1-million, a 41st $10,000, and three "Grand Prize" spaces (the jackpot started at $3 million and went up $25,000 per spin; there were 20 spins per week, not all of which were shown, and the highest jackpot won was $15,220,000). After that, the wheel added $25K, $50K, $100K, and $500K spaces, along with a "DOUBLE" space; landing on it earned another spin at double value, including the "Grand Prize".

When the state started Lotto in 1986 (which was the main reason most people voted for a lottery in the first place), interest in the "scratch-off ticket" games that led to the show dropped sharply, and so did the prizes. As such, in 1988, the "Grand Prize" spaces were changed to $1-million spaces.

On August 22, 1987, a truck driver from Los Angeles, Dave Flynn, spun the wheel, and landed on the "Grand Prize" slot, and won $3,825,000. During that run of the "Grand Prize" slot, it was a progressive jackpot that started at $3 Million, and for each spin that it was not won, the grand prize slot grew $25,000 per spin.

In 1995, the wheel was changed again, as "DECISION" spaces were added, which offered a player $50,000 to stop or another spin of the wheel, at the risk of landing on a smaller amount. In 1999, the "DOUBLE" and "DECISION" spaces were removed in favor of "TRIPLE" spaces, which earned a second spin at triple value. Any subsequent spins that land on "DOUBLE" or "TRIPLE" did not count and the wheel was spun again. These spins were cut from the show as they did not influence the outcome.

By the end of the series, a spin of the wheel always closed the show, whether the spinner got three "SPIN"s on the Big Spin scratcher or was the winner of Aces High.

The top winner of Aces High went up to spin the "Big Wheel". People who had "SPIN" three times on "Big Spin" scratchers also got to spin the wheel, although ultimately they did so without being televised when they had the alternative of going to Make Me a Millionaire.

=== Super Scratcher ===
A game of chance with a buyout option. Ran from Fall 1991 to January 21, 1995.

Each contestant faced the "Super Scratcher Board," a screen with 16 numbers. Cash amounts of $25,000 were hidden behind eight of the numbers, and wheel symbols behind the other eight; two of the latter were also marked with the word "BONUS." The contestant chose two numbers, then had the option to either take $40,000 and quit the game or play on. If both numbers showed $25,000, the contestant won that amount; if both of them showed wheels, the contestant earned the right to spin the wheel. If the symbols did not match, the contestant chose a third number and received whatever was behind it.

The wheel contained one "BONUS" section, which awarded $1 million or $2 million if a contestant found one or both "BONUS" wheel symbols respectively. Otherwise, it awarded $25,000.

=== 10-player rounds ===
In these games, introduced in 1995, ten players competed for a chance to go to the Big Wheel. One player would go on, the rest would get various amounts of money.

==== Winner's Circle ====
A simple game of chance. Ran from 2/4/95 to 11/98.

Ten players stood around a circular maze. A motorized ball named "Scooter" was dropped in the center, moving randomly. The game ended when the ball fell through a hole. The player standing behind the hole went on to the Big Wheel round; the others won $1,500.

==== California Countdown ====
The first two-round elimination game. Ran from 11/98 to 12/26/98.

Ten players stood behind a letter in the word "CALIFORNIA." When announced, the amounts were displayed. Seven players won a cash amount from $1,750 to $2,500. Three players then went to the second round, where each player chose a part of a California map (or one of three surfboards). One player went to the Big Wheel, the others won cash.

==== California Gold ====
Ran from 1/02/99 to 11/08/03.

The first round had ten players, each standing behind a mock dynamite plunger. Players pushed down the plunger, revealing either the word "Gold" or a money amount (which would be either four of $1,750, two of $2,000, one of $2,500, or one of $4,000). “Gold” or a money amount would be revealed in random order. The player who found “Gold” first would go last in round 2.

The second round originally had gold dust from January to May 1999, which later changed to gold nuggets in boxes suspended by pegs. For the first segment players would each pick a set of buckets, usually blue, from A to I having random amounts of gold from one to nine ounces/nuggets. The player who has the higher amount of gold units would pick first in the second segment. In the second segment, which usually consisted of pink buckets, if a player added more gold to their cart but did not go over the 10 gold ounce/nugget limit and then chose to stop, the other player would get their own set of buckets, usually purple, from A to I.

Examples of certain episodes where the Round 2 game play does not need purple buckets is where one player overflows/ends up with eleven nuggets from the pink set of buckets after gaining control with the blue set of buckets (or first segment). Alternatively the player with the most nuggets after the first set may choose to stop and therefore their opponent needs to only work with the pink buckets.

The second format lasted from May 1999 to December 2003. The player to get the most gold dust or nuggets without going over 10 advanced to the Big Wheel, and the loser got $5,000.

In the event the players were tied, the buckets used prior to the tie were taken out, and the gold carts were emptied. Finn asked each player to pick another bucket, and whoever had the most gold got to spin the wheel.

==== Aces High ====
The last 10-player elimination round, introduced in 2004. Usually played near the beginning of the show, but if there were no people going directly to the wheel, it was in the second half. Rarely, two Aces High games were played.

===== First round =====
There were 20 cards on a conveyor belt, 10 of which were visible at any time in the following distribution:

- Two Aces
- One $4,000 card
- One $2,500 card
- Two $2,000 cards
- Four $1,750 cards

The 10 players stood behind the belt, and each player secretly cast a vote to advance the cards by one, two, or three spaces. The cards then moved to a starting position, determined by random draw, and finally they moved the sum of all players' votes, from 10 to 30 spaces. When they stopped, the two players with the Aces advanced to the second round and the others each received the amount in front of them.

===== Second round =====
The two winners of the first round faced separate sets of four wheels, each marked with three cards: the Queen, the King, and the Ace. The player's wheels were spun, and they pressed down on a card to stop the spinning and determine their initial hand. The ranks, from highest to lowest, were:

1. Four of a Kind
2. Three of a Kind
3. Two Pair
4. One Pair

After the first spin, the player with the lower hand could re-spin any or all of their wheels once in an attempt to improve it. If they did not at least tie their opponent's hand, the round ended immediately; otherwise, the opponent was also given a chance to re-spin.

After the re-spins, the player with the higher hand advanced to the Big Wheel, while the loser received $5,000. Any ties were broken with a one-wheel spin.

=== Fantasy 5 Dream Machine ===
A bean machine-like game, introduced in 1995 and named the "Fantasy 5 Dream Machine" because a player had to purchase five tickets to receive an entry form, which was filled out and sent in; one or more entries were drawn for each show.

At the start, the player pushed a button starting the first play, depositing a ball into the machine. The ball then bounced off pins and "spinners" to land in one of five spaces (from left to right):

- $30,000
- $10,000
- $40,000
- $25,000
- $20,000

On subsequent plays, if the ball landed in an occupied space, the amount from that space was deducted, but the amount would be won back if the ball landed in that space again. The maximum was five plays; the contestant had the ability to stop at any time. If all five spaces were filled at the end of the game, a $25,000 bonus was added for a total of $150,000; otherwise, the player won the total of the amounts from the spaces filled by one or three balls apiece. Only twice was the $150,000 won.

From 2004 to 2009, if there were no contestants going directly to the wheel at the end of the show, three Fantasy 5 Dream Machines were played, with Aces High in the second half of the show.

=== Other games ===
During the run of the show, various other games were played, all tying into various instant tickets. Some of these games would carry over to, or came from, other states' lottery shows:

==== The Big Wheel ====
There is a wheel on the Oregon Lottery Jackpot Show that greatly resembles the original Big Spin Wheel used during the Woolery Era. Another vertically mounted example comes from the endgame on the Ohio Lottery’s Cash Explosion. Two horizontal variations have been used. The revamped/second contestant wheel on Flamingo Fortune as well as Zero Gravity from Powerball: The Game Show.

==== Whirl Win ====
Originally used by the same name on the Ohio Lottery’s Cash Explosion. later used as Money Machine on Illinois' Luckiest, with a time limit of 45 seconds instead of 30, and with $50,000 as the top prize.

==== Monopoly ====
The mainstay game of Monopoly Millionaire’s Club.

==== Wizard of Odds & Win and Spin ====
The concept of drawing balls is similar to a portion of the game Capsize and Powerball Express from Powerball: The Game Show. The concept is also similar to the Number’s and Win 4 drawings from the New York Lottery.

==== Fame & Fortune ====
A homage to all lottery game shows that use the “pick from boxes for money” such as the Wisconsin Lottery’s Money Game, The Ohio Lottery’s Cash Explosion and the Illinois Lottery’s $100,000 Fortune Hunt. Similar to the Ohio Lottery’s Make Me Famous, Make Me Rich, there is a unique spin on picking from boxes for money.

==== High Roller ====
originally used as Coney Island Coaster on NY Wired. The concept of having a ball released from a shielded position also came from ‘’Gauntlet” on “Powerball: The Game Show.”

==== Camelot's Riches ====
originally used as Steeple Chase in Florida on Flamingo Fortune (also used as Rolling Thunder in Illinois on a special episode of Illinois' Luckiest for the Illinois Lottery's 25th anniversary), the prize was $100,000 instead of $250,000 (and $50,000 in Illinois).

==== Fantasy 5 Dream Machine ====
originally used as Double Dollars from Illinois Instant Riches/Illinois' Luckiest (also called Freefall on Bonus Bonanza in Massachusetts, and Lake Placid Racer on NY Wired), but with eight slots instead of five, no assigned money amount to each slot ($5,000 each time a contestant hits an empty slot), and using strikes rather than taking away money.

==== Twice as Grand Prix ====
The concept would be carried into the first game of the first episode of the quarterly show Make Me Rich for the Michigan Lottery. The "picking from 12 numbers" board, however, came from Illinois Instant Riches, Flamingo Fortune, and NY Wired, and never had been featured on The Big Spin. The concept of advancing by having a different binary choice from the other two came from “Odd Money Wins” from The Massachusetts Lottery’s “Bonus Bonanza.”

==== Road to Riches (1987) ====
Hostess Gene Fox (née Nixon) would draw envelopes which contained tickets from a drum. Whoever’s ticket was drawn would win a car.

==== Win & Spin (1988) ====
Hostess Gene Fox (née Nixon) would draw three letters from three different ball-drawing machines. Each ball had a letter on them. If the letters match an at-home player’s winning ticket, they would win $500.

==== Whirl Win (1994–1995) ====
A player takes part in trying to get as much money as possible in 30 seconds in two glass boxes. The player can pick specially marked sheets from the ground or in the air and put them in boxes on his or her sides. When time is up, the player's winnings are counted in the boxes and in their hands. There are one hundred sheets marked $100, and ten sheets with $1,000. If the player gets the marked sheet worth $25,000, the player automatically wins that amount. The format is similar to the bonus round in the 2002–2003 version of Beat The Clock, and the bonus round of The Diamond Head Game.

==== Monopoly (1995) ====
One lottery winner played in this adaptation of the board game. The player was given four rolls of the dice. Starting at GO, the player began by choosing to move forward either 2 or 7 spaces, which takes him/her to either Community Chest or Chance, sending the player to yet another space on the board. Each property conceals either an amount of money from $4,000 to $7,000, or a Top Hat. If a Top Hat is revealed, the player can either cash it in for $10,000 or keep it in an attempt to find a second one. The player also places hotels on two properties which adds an extra $7,500 if he/she lands on that property. Landing on Go to Jail halved the winnings, but did not take away the Top Hat. Income Tax took a fourth of the winnings, Luxury Tax took $750 away; passing GO earns $200. Getting two Top Hats bumped the winnings to $50,000.

The first game was taped in Sacramento on February 24, 1995, and was broadcast on March 4, 1995. Dan Baker, of South San Francisco, was the very first contestant.

==== Weekly Grand/Extravaganza 2000 (1996-2000) ====
A draw for at-home players. Lottery players from across the state would send in a Weekly Grand or an Extravaganza 2000 ticket to be entered into a random draw on the show. The person who gets his/her ticket picked would win $1,000/week for the next 20 years totalling $1,040,000 (or $2,000/week for the Extravaganza 2000 drawing totalling $2,080,000). The last Weekly Grand Drawing was on September 30, 2000. The money won from these drawings were included into the total winnings announced at the end of the show.

==== Dream Home (1996) ====
Three players begin the game. Each player chooses a key, which opens one of three doors. Behind each door is either $1,000, $2,000, or a large key, which means the player wins a chance at the grand prize.

In the second round, the player chooses three keys out of 18 available. 16 keys win an amount of money associated with one area of the home (from the $10,000 patio/backyard to the $40,000 garage), 2 keys for each of eight rooms. One key opened the booby prize—the $8,000 closet—and one opened the grand prize: a $180,000 dream home. After each key is used, the player can choose to take the room they won or give it up for the next key.

==== Wizard of Odds (1996–1997) ====
Three players took part. Each player took turns hitting a button, which sent a ball up from a hopper containing 100 balls. Most balls had a dollar amount from $1,000 to $6,000, which was added to the player's score. Other balls won bonus turns, took money away, had a “0” which awarded no additional money or disqualified a player immediately. Seventeen balls had a lightning bolt on them; if one of them was drawn, the player could cash it in for $10,000 or hold on to it in the hopes of drawing a second lightning bolt. If successful, the player won $50,000. Otherwise, each player got 5 turns. The minimum a player could win was $4,000.

==== Fame and Fortune (1998–1999) ====
Three players started. In the original version, each player chose a letter from a board of 16, each number having a number from 1 to 16. The two players with the highest numbers advanced to the next round; the third place player left with $5,000. In the second round, the board had 9 numbers, each concealing an amount of money from $7,000 to $13,000. The player who chose the higher amount advanced to the third round, the loser took home the amount he/she picked.

In the third round, the player chose one of four stars. Three concealed amounts of money which were added to the player's total, while one hid another star behind it, which won $75,000. During "Big Spin 2000", a couple changes were made: Only the player got to see the number/money amount chosen. After everyone picked, the player secretly decided to keep their picks or make another choice from the board.

==== Fun in the Sun (1997–1998) ====
Four players played. Each player chose one of four keys. One key unlocked the door to a 1998 Ford Mustang. After all the keys were chosen, the players tried to unlock the door, one by one. The player that unlocked the car won it, along with $12,000 for taxes and licensing fees. The others left with $2,500.

==== High Roller (1999–2002) ====
Two players played. At the beginning, a ball was sent along a track which consisted of five hills and six valleys. The ball rolled back and forth among the hills until it settled into one of the valleys. The player who controlled that valley (each player had 3) went on to the next round, the other player took home $5,000.

In the second round, the ball was sent along the track again, with the valleys worth from $20,000 to $75,000. After that, the player could stop with the money he/she won or send the ball down the track one more time. For this third go-round, three valleys double the player's total, one valley added $10,000, and two valleys cut the player's winnings in half. The maximum possible prize is $150,000.

==== Camelot's Riches (2001–2003) ====
One player took part. In the first round, the player set six balls—four gold, two black—down a track of ramps by pulling on a replica of King Arthur’s sword “Excalibur”. The balls could split up and collide until they reached the bottom of the track and crossed the finish line. If a black ball finished first, the player won $10,000; if a gold ball finished first, the player got $25,000.

For the second round, there were four gold and four black balls used. A black ball winning the race earned the player $10,000 more, while a gold ball won $75,000. After the third round, the player could either play the third round with three gold and four black balls, or with six gold and three black balls. The second set, however, would cost the player half his/her winnings at that point. A black ball coming in first added nothing, a gold ball finishing first added $75,000, but if the gold balls came in first, second, and third, the player won $250,000.

==== Twice as Grand Prix/Weekly Payday Raceway (2001–2003) ====
Each heat begins with six lottery players. The six players were grouped into three groups of two. For each group, the player reached into a pouch and drew one of three balls out. Two were green, one was red. If a green ball was drawn, the other player took a turn with one green and one red ball. If a red ball was drawn, that player was out - with a consolation prize of $2,500 - and the other player advanced. The winning player then tried to draw the green ball again for a one-space head start in the race. (This rule was not used in the final championship race.)

When the race began, each player selected to go 1 or 3 spaces. The player who chose a different number than the other two got to move forward that number of spaces. After two rounds, the choice became 2 or 4 spaces. The first player to go 5 spaces and cross the finish line advanced to the final round and the other players take home $5,000. The final round was played between the three winners of each heat, and the eventual champion won $2,000 a week for 20 years ($2,080,000 total). For the two unsuccessful contestants in the final round, they would receive $25,000.

== Legacy ==
Following the show's ending in 2009, the wheel was placed into the California Lottery State Museum in Sacramento as part of a permanent exhibit. Guests of the museum are allowed to spin the wheel.

The wheel was brought out of retirement in 2021 as part of a COVID-19 vaccine lottery initiative by Governor Gavin Newsom. 15 random recipients of the vaccine each received $50,000.
