= Chain Reaction (game show) =

American television game show

- Logo for the 2021 revival
- Also known as: The New Chain Reaction (1986–90); The $40,000 Chain Reaction (1990–91)
- Genre: Game show
- Created by: Bob Stewart
- Written by: Taylor Humphries
- Directed by: Mike Gargiulo; Bruce Burmester; Lucien Albert; Matthew Cohen (2006–07); Hal Grant (2015–21); Stacie Saugen (2021–22)
- Presented by: Bill Cullen; Blake Emmons; Geoff Edwards; Dylan Lane; Mike Catherwood
- Announcer: Johnny Gilbert; Rod Charlebois
- Music by: Bob Cobert (1980, 1986–91); Alan Ett (2006–07); Joel Beckerman (2015–16); Vincent Ott (2021–22)
- Country of origin: United States
- Original language: English
- No. of seasons: 1 (NBC); 5 (USA); 2 (GSN, 2006–07); 1 (GSN, 2015–16); 2 (GSN, 2021–22)
- No. of episodes: 114 (NBC); 650 (USA); 130 (GSN, 2006–07); 40 (GSN, 2015–16); 192 (GSN, 2021–22)

Production
- Executive producers: Bob Stewart; Tom Froundjian (1979–91); Michael Davies (2006–07); Vincent Rubino (2015–16); Mike Richards (2021–22); Ed Egan (2021); Brennan Huntington (2021–22)
- Producers: Sande Stewart; Jennifer Simons (2006–07); Farshad Tehrani (2006–07); Robert Platzer (2021–22)
- Production locations: The Burbank Studios (1979–80); CFCF-DT Montreal (1986–91); Sony Music Studios, New York City (2006–07); Los Angeles (2015–22)
- Editors: Alex Maxson; Myron Santos; Brett Jozel; Dan Cotter
- Running time: 22–26 minutes
- Production companies: Bob Stewart Productions (1980); Bob/Sande Stewart Productions (1986–91); Embassy Row (2006–07); Sony Pictures Television (2006–22); Game Show Enterprises (2021–22)

Original release
- Network: NBC
- Release: January 14 – June 20, 1980
- Network: USA Network
- Release: September 29, 1986 – December 27, 1991
- Network: Game Show Network
- Release: August 1, 2006 – June 9, 2007
- Release: July 16, 2015 – January 29, 2016
- Release: February 22, 2021 – June 20, 2022

Chain Reaction is an American television game show created by Bob Stewart, in which players compete to form chains composed of two-word phrases.

The show has been revived four times. Bill Cullen hosted the original series on NBC from January 14, 1980 to June 20, 1980. The second version aired on the USA Network from September 29, 1986 to December 27, 1991, and was hosted first by Blake Emmons and later by Geoff Edwards (who also substituted for Cullen for two weeks on the NBC version). A third version aired on Game Show Network from August 1, 2006 to June 9, 2007, hosted by Dylan Lane. A fourth version also on Game Show Network was announced on January 26, 2015, with Vincent Rubino as executive producer and hosted by Mike Catherwood. Forty episodes were ordered for Catherwood's version, which aired from July 16, 2015 to January 29, 2016. The most recent version, also on Game Show Network, was announced in November 2020, with Mike Richards as executive producer, Ed Egan as showrunner and Lane returning as host, it aired from February 22, 2021 to June 20, 2022.

== Overview ==
The game is centered around solving a word-chain puzzle. In 1980, the chain comprised eight words. From 1986 to 2016, it comprised seven words, and in 2021, it comprised six words for the first three rounds and seven in the fourth. The words in the chain are linguistically or logically connected, with both the word at the top and the word at the bottom revealed at the outset.

By making inferences based on the revealed words and the revealed letters in incomplete words, contestants try to fill in the word chains to score points (dollars on Game Show Network). From 1980 to 1991, the team/player that reached the point goal first won the game. Since 2006, the team with the highest money total after the fourth round wins the game. A team can also win the game if at any time their opponents' money total is reduced to zero during the fourth round. Except from 1990 to 1991, the winning team/player then played the bonus round, which varied depending on the series.

== NBC ==
The first version of Chain Reaction aired for 23 weeks from January 14 to June 20, 1980 on NBC, and was hosted by Bill Cullen, except for two weeks when Geoff Edwards hosted while Cullen was filling in for Allen Ludden on Password Plus. (At that time, Edwards was also hosting Barry-Enright's Play the Percentages). The announcer was Johnny Gilbert.

This version aired at 12:00 noon ET/11:00 AM CT/MT/PT, facing out CBS' The Young and the Restless for the first three weeks, and ABC's The $20,000 Pyramid. However, many affiliates aired local news at that time slot, preempting Chain Reaction. The show was one of three game shows, the others being High Rollers and Hollywood Squares, which were canceled in June 1980 to make room for the 90-minute talk show The David Letterman Show.

Repeats of this version aired for several years on cable, first on CBN Cable from March 29, 1982, to May 4, 1984, then later on the USA Network from September 30, 1985 to the debut of the new version that originated in Canada. Game Show Network aired reruns of this version from October 1997 to April 1998.

=== Main game ===
Two teams of three competed in each game. A team consisted of one contestant and two celebrity guests. The teams were shown the beginning and ending words of an eight-word chain. Each word is related to the word above it and below it, the connection could be either a word association or a phrase. A sample chain could look like this:

TWIST
ANKLE
BRACELET
CHAIN
GANG
WAR
STRATEGY
CHESS

The challenging team began the game. When two new players competed, a coin toss determined which team went first. Usually, the challengers were the blue team and the champions were the gold team.

As the game continued, the words would be revealed one letter at a time. A player's turn consisted of calling for a letter in the next word above or below one of the already revealed words and then guessing the word (note that the last letter of each word is not revealed). A correct response won one point for each letter in the word (two if the word had a '+' mark next to it) and that team kept control of the board. If the player in control was incorrect or gave no guess, control went back to the other team. The game continued until either one team scored 50 points, or the chain was finished. If that happened, another chain was put up and the game continued until one team reached the goal of 50 points, any letters exceeding 50 points are not included in the player's score. That team's contestant won the game, $250 (later dropped when the final version of the bonus round was introduced) and the right to play for $10,000 in the bonus round. The losing player received $5 a point for playing (changed to parting gifts with the third bonus round).

=== Instant Reaction ===
In the bonus round, the two celebrities from the winning team attempted to get the contestant to guess a series of words or phrases by constructing a question one word at a time. The celebrities alternated giving words to construct the question, then hit a bell signaling the contestant to respond. Cash was awarded to the contestant for every correct response.

In the first format (which only lasted the first week of the series), the team was staked with $1 and had a 60-second time limit. Each correct response added one half of a zero behind the $1, meaning that after two correct responses, the player would win $10, after four the player would win $100, and so on up to the $10,000 maximum.

For the next four weeks, the time limit was increased to 90 seconds, and the first correct response was worth $1, with the next three each adding a zero behind it. At that point, the contestant's winnings would be $1,000 and the next four correct responses each added $1,000 to their total. The ninth overall correct response augmented their total to $10,000.

The third format had the same time limit, but each of the first nine correct responses was now worth $100, and the tenth correct response increased the contestant's winnings to $10,000. After two weeks, the format was slightly modified so that the contestant was staked with $100 at the start of the round, thus reducing the number of correct answers needed for a $10,000 win to nine.

If at any point a contestant provided an incorrect response, a celebrity gave two words in succession, accidentally gave part of the answer, or passed on the word, the word was removed from play and game play continued to the next word.

Champions remained on the show until they were defeated or until they won ten matches.

Stewart later developed and expanded the bonus round of Chain Reaction into the game show Go.

"Instant Reaction" would later be revived as the bonus round on the first Dylan Lane-hosted version of Chain Reaction.

== USA/Global ==
The second version of Chain Reaction premiered in 1986, airing on the Global Television Network in Canada and the USA Network in the United States. Blake Emmons hosted the show for a few weeks before being replaced by Geoff Edwards (although USA started the season by airing several weeks of Edwards episodes, then showing Emmons' reign, Edwards has had experience having hosted two weeks of the NBC version, subbing for then-regular host Bill Cullen). Rod Charlebois served as co-host/announcer, who presented the "home game" for the viewing audience (Emmons presented the home game by himself during his time as host). Charlebois was a local radio and television personality at CFCF radio and CFCF-TV in Montreal, Quebec, Canada, where the USA version was taped. Charlebois was given an on-air role for most of the show's run, due to Cancon laws which required American shows taping in Canada to feature at least one Canadian personality on-air. Global aired reruns of this version through the mid-1990s, while Game Show Network aired reruns for a brief period in late 1997.

What was originated of the version was originally developed in early 1983 when Bob Stewart Productions entered into a partnership with Dick Clark Productions (a production company owned by the host of Pyramid, Dick Clark) and Syndicast Services to develop a 90-minute game show block consisting of revivals of old Stewart properties Eye Guess, Three on a Match and Chain Reaction, and attempted to delay to 1984-1985, but none of which got into the ground with Geoff Edwards intended to host the version.

Reruns of neither this version nor the NBC version have aired since the premiere of Dylan Lane's first version in 2006.

=== Main game ===
Each chain comprised seven words. The teams were reduced to two civilian players each and each was given one responsibility. One teammate was the letter giver and decided whether to give a letter to his or her partner or the other team's word guesser. As before, a correct response was worth points and control of the board. In round one, each word guessed was worth 10 points, but the final word guessed in that chain was worth 20 (changed to 15 in season two). In round two, these values escalated to 20 points each and 40 points for the final word. If a fourth chain was needed to decide the game, the point values were 40 points per word and 80 for the final word. The first team to score 200 points won the game. That team played the bonus game and returned to the next show.

During the run, two methods of earning bonus money were used. In the first season, the middle word of the second chain was also a bonus word (designated first by an asterisk, then by a dollar sign) worth CA$250 for the team that guessed it. For seasons two to four, the players played a Missing Link. The team in the lead would be shown the first and last words of a three-word chain. If they could guess the word in between with no letters revealed, the team received CA$500. Every wrong guess added a letter while taking away CA$100 from the potential payoff.

For seasons three and four, only solo players participated and a score of 300 won the game. The players now had to decide whether to take a letter for themselves or give one to their opponent.

Champions remained on the show until they were defeated or held their title for five consecutive days. During the first season, any team that retired undefeated received a CA$5,000 bonus.

=== Bonus chain ===
The winning team/player could collect a cash jackpot by completing one last word chain. The team/player was shown the first word in a chain and the initial letter of the other words. One at a time, the player(s) would guess at the next word in the chain. For each wrong guess, the next letter would be filled in and a letter deducted from their account. If the team could finish the chain before running out of letters the team won the cash jackpot. If not, they (or he/she) won CA$100 per word, including the one at the top. The jackpot began at CA$3,000 ($2,000 with the solo players) and CA$1,000 was added each day it was not claimed. The highest pot was CA$16,000. While Emmons was host the account was nine letters. When Geoff Edwards took over it was lowered to seven. During season one, if there was extra time afterward, another bonus round was played, this time worth CA$1,000 for the team's favorite charity.

The bonus chain was removed late in season four because the end of the season had an elimination tournament of champions, where the sixteen top winners of seasons three and four returned in a tournament format (sixteen players reduced to eight, then down to four, and then down to two). The winner of the final game won CA$20,000 and the runner-up won CA$2,000. Games were all played to 500 points.

=== The $40,000 Chain Reaction ===
On New Year's Eve 1990, the show was revamped with a tournament format featuring 128 players competing for CA$40,000. The game was played as before, but there was no bonus chain and two new players competed in each show. The values for each chain remained the same, but if a fifth chain was needed, the point values were 50 points per word and 100 for the final word. In the event of a game ending with only four chains played, co-host Charlebois would play the fifth chain against the day's winner.

Eight players competed on the first four shows. After four days, those four winners played two each for the next two days. Those two winners played on the seventh day and the winner of that game won CA$7,500.

The player who led after the second chain got to play a Missing Link for CA$300. The Missing Link changed its format as well. After the change, the first letter of the middle word was given, the first letter was worth $300 and subsequent letters reduced the value by CA$100.

After sixteen CA$7,500 tournaments were played, those 16 players played in a single-elimination tournament. The semi-finals were double-elimination and the two players remaining played one game for CA$40,000.

=== Home game ===
Each day, before closing the show, Charlebois would present the answer to yesterday's home game and the current game. The home game consisted of a Missing Link (see above) and was actually referred to as such during the first season, but later renamed simply "the home game" when this format was adapted as the new round two mini-bonus in the second season. The home game first started while Emmons was still hosting, during which time he presented the home game alone and encouraged viewers to write the chains down on a piece of paper. Charlebois didn't start coming onto the stage to present the home game until Edwards took over the hosting duties, per the aforementioned Cancon regulations.

== Game Show Network ==
A new version of the show debuted on August 1, 2006, on Game Show Network. This version was hosted by Dylan Lane and produced by Michael Davies' production company Embassy Row. Seasons one and two were taped at the Sony Music Studios in New York City. Game Show Network began airing the second season on March 13, 2007 and ended on June 9, 2007.

Each team consisted of three people of the same gender (except for one week in which the teams consisted of three teachers against three students from the same school). The bonus round was simply a revival of the original bonus round from 1980.

A second Game Show Network version was commissioned in January 2015, with the new 40-episode season featuring Vincent Rubino as executive producer and Mike Catherwood of the nationally syndicated Loveline radio program as the host. It debuted on July 16, 2015. This version is the same as the previous version, minus the Speed Chains, and with two contestants on each team, the bonus round is nearly identical to the Edwards/Emmons version.

A third Game Show Network version was ordered in November 2020, premiering on February 22, 2021, with Mike Richards as executive producer, Ed Egan as showrunner, and Lane returning as host. Teams of three contestants each and the Speed Chains from the first Game Show Network version were reinstated. The bonus round is a timed variation of the main game where the winning team has 60 seconds to complete three chains. The set resurrects the blue and gold color scheme of the NBC version.

=== Main game ===
There are four chains in the main game (not counting the Speed Chains). The gameplay is similar to the NBC and USA/Global versions, except that the words in the chain are now always two-word phrases or compound words. In the first season of the 2006–2007 version, the final letter of a word would be revealed (though the fact that it was the final letter was not announced, and sometimes was not evident). At that point, if the team did not guess the word correctly, the word was revealed and neither team received the money. Since the second season of the 2006–2007 version, the last letter is not revealed (as in the 1980 and 1986–1991 versions), although a shuffling placeholder (or a blank space in Catherwood's version) is shown in place of the last letter. If the word was not correctly guessed, the other team had a chance to either guess that word or choose a different space but did not receive another letter.

In round one, each correct word is worth $100; in round two, words are worth $200; and words in round three are worth $300. Whichever team was behind going into a round started the next round (in the event of a tie, the team who did not start the last chain started the next chain). In the first two Game Show Network runs, all chains that were not Speed Chains were seven-word chains. In the 2021 version, the first three rounds are each played with a six-word chain.

In the fourth round, each team is required to wager between $100 and $500 of their bank before being given their letter. If correct, they win their bet and keep control, if not, the amount of the bet is deducted and they lose control (or lose the game if they wagered the entire bankroll). In the 2021 version, the fourth round is the only round played with a seven-word chain, with wagers between $100 and $500, except a team can now wager up to $1,000 once there is only one word left to be revealed in the chain.

A team can win the game if either they are ahead after the fourth round, or if at any time the other team's bankroll is reduced to zero. In the event of a tie at the end of the fourth round, the Tiebreaker is played.

==== Speed chain ====
Except when Catherwood hosted, after each of the first three rounds, whichever team correctly identified the final word to complete the chain was allowed to complete a four-word Speed Chain with the first letter of the middle two words given. An example could be:

HALF
B_______ (BAKED)
A_______ (ALASKA)
PIPELINE

The team has seven seconds to confer and come up with the two words. If correct, they won the same value as a single correct word in the previous round ($100 to $300). If neither team completed the chain, neither team got to play the speed chain. The 2015 version eliminated the speed chains, except for the Tiebreaker. The speed chains after the first three rounds returned for the 2021 version. Going into the first commercial break in the 2021 version, a three-word chain with the middle word missing was shown for home viewers (as in the USA/Global version, when they were presented at the end of each episode), with the answer revealed coming out of the commercial break.

=== Tiebreaker ===
In the 2006 and 2015 versions, if the fourth round ended in a tie, the teams were given alternating Speed Chains in a "sudden death" format. If one team did not solve their Speed Chain, the other team needed to only solve their next Speed Chain to win the game. Both teams kept their money, and the losing team received unacknowledged parting gifts as well.

In the 2021 version, the Tiebreaker uses only one Speed Chain. The team that went first in the fourth round has the option to play the Speed Chain or pass it to the other team. The tiebreaking Speed Chain is played in the same manner as after each of the first three rounds of regulation play (including the seven-second conference). If the team playing the Speed Chain successfully solves the chain, that team wins the game. If not, the other team automatically wins.

=== Bonus Round ===
The winning team then advances to the bonus round, which was different for each version.

==== 2006 ("Instant Reaction" revival) ====
For Lane's first series, the bonus round was a revival of "Instant Reaction" from the NBC version. The first two members gave clues by building questions, alternating one word at a time (instead of two or more words). If either clue giver gave more than one word in a row, built a clue that was not loosely in the form of a question, or said part of the answer, the clue givers advanced to the next word. The third player could not see the answers but had to ring in to guess the answer to the question his/her partners were constructing. Once the guesser rang in, no more clues may be given on that word. Any team member could also pass as often as possible to remove the current word.

===== Season one =====
In the first season, the team was given 90 seconds to go through as many as 20 words. The player setup was the same as in 1980 except:

- The table was now much smaller.
- The team now stood at the table instead of sitting.
- All three members of the team now had their hands over the bell—now a standard call bell—at all times. (On the NBC version, the clue-giver that gave the last word to finish the question reached over and pressed a raised button in front of the guesser to ring the bell.)
- Because of the smaller table, the guesser was now blindfolded.

In the first 29 episodes, if a team got seven correct answers, they would double their money from the main game, if they got ten correct, the main game winnings were tripled. For the following 36 episodes, the requirements were reduced to only five and seven correct answers, respectively.

===== Season two =====
A new format was introduced for season two. The guesser sat in a chair with his/her back to the clue-givers and held a signaling button to ring in. When the guesser rang in, the clock stopped for up to three seconds while the guesser gave his/her answer. If the team guessed five correct answers in 60 seconds, they earned an additional $5,000. If not, they were given $100 for each correct answer.

==== 2015 (Superchain) ====
In Catherwood's bonus round, the winning team had 45 seconds to guess seven more words. To start, a keyword was given, and the seven words involved connected to that word. Then on each word, the first three letters were given one at a time. A correct answer moved on to the next word. The team could pass on a word if they were stuck and then had to go back to it if there was time left on the clock. Guessing all seven words correctly won an additional $5,000.

==== 2021 (Three Final Chains) ====
The 2021 version's bonus round is a timed variation of the main game, in which the winning team must complete three final chains of four, five, and six words, in that order within 60 seconds. In turn, each player calls for a letter below the top word or above the bottom word, and then attempts to guess that word, control then passes to the next player, whether the guess is correct or not. The clock stops when each chain is completed. A team that completes all three chains (nine words total) in time wins an additional $10,000.

== International versions ==
| Country | Local name | Host | Channel | Year(s) aired |
|---|---|---|---|---|
| Argentina | Reacción en cadena | Homero Pettinato | El Trece | 2025 |
| Canada | The New/$40,000 Chain Reaction (English) | Blake Emmons (1986); Geoff Edwards (1986–1991) | Global | 1986–1991 (Note: Aired in both the U.S. and Canada for both audiences/players.) |
| Canada | Action Réaction (French) | Pierre Lalonde | TQS | 1986–1990 |
| Indonesia | Kata Berkait | Nico Siahaan (1995–2001); Taufik Savalas (2001) | RCTI | 1995–2001 |
| Italy | Reazione a catena – L'intesa vincente | Pupo (2007–2009) Pino Insegno (2010–2013; 2024–present) Amadeus (2014–2017) Gabriele Corsi (2018) Marco Liorni (2019–2024) | Rai 1 | 2007–present |
| Serbia | Lančana Reakcija | Voja Nedeljković | TV Košava | 2006–2007 |
| Spain | Reacción en cadena | Ion Aramendi | Telecinco | 2022–2025 |
| Turkey | Kelime Zinciri | Kâmil Güler | Samanyolu TV | 2012 |
| United Kingdom | Lucky Ladders | Lennie Bennett | ITV | 1988–1993 |
| United States (original format) | Chain Reaction | Bill Cullen (1980); Geoff Edwards (1980, sub-host) (Note: Edwards filled in for two weeks while Cullen was filling in for an ill Allen Ludden on Password Plus.); Dylan Lane (2006–2007; 2021–2022); Mike Catherwood (2015–2016) | NBC (1980); Game Show Network (2006–2022) | 1980; 2006–2007; 2015–2016; 2021–2022 |
| United States (original format) | The New/$40,000 Chain Reaction | Blake Emmons (1986); Geoff Edwards (1986–1991) | USA | 1986–1991 |
