= Larry Anderson (actor) =

American actor and magician

- Anderson in Brothers and Sisters, 1979
- Born: September 22, 1952 (age 74); Minnesota, U.S.
- Occupations: Actor; magician
- Years active: 1966–present

Larry Anderson (born September 22, 1952) is an American actor and magician.

== Early work ==
He originally started as an assistant to magician Mark Wilson in 1973, and was immediately put to work on the set of The Magician (starring Bill Bixby), assisting Wilson as the show's magic coordinator. He has since appeared in several television series and films, and is also known for his uncredited role as Michael Long (renamed Michael Knight later in the episode) in the pilot episode of the 1980s hit TV series Knight Rider. His voice was overdubbed by David Hasselhoff who, when the character was shot in the face and given plastic surgery, took over the role for the remainder of the series.

== Career ==
Anderson's other TV roles include The Six Million Dollar Man, Charlie's Angels, and The Amazing Spider-Man (all in 1977); the short lived 1979 TV series Brothers and Sisters; and the soap opera, Days of Our Lives in 1987, appearing as James Dixon. He also hosted three game shows, the first being a revival of Truth or Consequences in 1987, The Big Spin from 1995 to 1996, and Trivia Track on GSN for a few months. He also co-starred with Lucille Ball as her son-in-law on her final television series, the short-lived Life With Lucy.

Anderson's movie appearances include Martians Go Home (1990), Eve of Destruction (1991), and Star Trek: Insurrection (1998) as a Tarlac officer.

He has made guest appearances on TV shows including Happy Days, The A-Team, Mork & Mindy, Matlock, Matt Houston (1984 episode, “Apostle of Death”), and The O.C. Anderson also portrayed Ronald McDonald in at least one TV commercial for McDonald's.

Anderson also hosted a weekly quiz internet radio show on "Shokus Internet Radio" created by game show producer Ron Greenberg titled Anyone Can Play... But Don't Call Us, We'll Call You! from 2006-2008

He is also known for the "JawDroppers" Video Collection, a beginner-intermediate level instructional magic series (5 volume set) shot from two perspectives, as the person being entertained and as the entertainer.

== Personal life ==
=== Scientology ===
Anderson was a Scientologist for 33 years and starred in Orientation: A Scientology Information Film. In 2009, Anderson left the Church of Scientology and asked for more than $100,000 back for services he had paid for but not yet used. His conversation with Tommy Davis about the money was made available online by the St. Petersburg Times. In 2010, Anderson appeared on the BBC's Panorama The Secrets of Scientology programme, hosted by John Sweeney.

== Selected filmography ==
- Martians Go Home (1989) - Newscaster
- Eve of Destruction (1991) - BMW Businessman
- Star Trek: Insurrection (1998) - Tarlac Officer
- Can I Get a Witness Protection? (2017) - Bank Administrator

Preceded by Bob Hilton	Truth or Consequences Host; 1987	Succeeded by Incumbent
Preceded by Geoff Edwards	Host of The Big Spin; January 2, 1995–September 7, 1996	Succeeded by Jack Gallagher
