= Punchlines =

- Genre: Comedy panel game
- Presented by: Lennie Bennett
- Voices of: Robin Houston (1983-4)
- Theme music composer: Laurie Holloway
- Country of origin: United Kingdom
- Original language: English
- No. of series: 5
- No. of episodes: 79 (inc. 1 special)

Production
- Running time: 30 minutes (inc. adverts)
- Production company: LWT

Original release
- Network: ITV
- Release: 3 January 1981 – 22 December 1984

Punchlines is a comedy panel game show that aired on ITV from 3 January 1981 to 22 December 1984, hosted by Lennie Bennett. The show was based on a failed 1979 American game show pilot of the same name hosted by Bill Cullen, which, in turn, was an attempted reboot of another American game show, Eye Guess (1966–69).

== Format ==
=== Main Game ===
Each week, teams comprising a celebrity guest and a non-celebrity had to match punchlines given by eight other guests who were seated in Celebrity Squares-style boxes to the questions asked by the host. The first team to reach 150 points won the chance to win a major prize, while the losing contestant left with a Lennie Bennett doll in the first two series. From series three onwards, losers left with a case of champagne and some glasses.

At the beginning of each show, they would all look into the camera one at a time and introduce themselves. From the third series onwards, the Punchliners consisted of a mixture of the original Punchliners and better-known celebrities. The original Punchliners included Rose-Marie, Fogwell Flax, Bryan Joan Elliott, Aiden J. Harvey, Judy Gridley, Patti Gold and, making his first regular TV game-show appearance, Matthew Kelly.

=== Bonus Round ===
In the final round, the winning contestant had to match seven of the eight punchlines correctly to win the star prize, but if they failed to do so they went away with the prize that corresponded to how many correct punchlines they had matched.

== Australian version ==
A pilot for an Australian adaptation of the show, hosted by Jeremy Kewley, was made for the Seven Network in 1986.

== Transmissions ==
=== Series ===
Series	Start date	End date	Episodes
1	3 January 1981	28 March 1981	13
2	5 September 1981	19 December 1981	16
3	24 December 1982	9 April 1983	16
4	10 September 1983	31 December 1983	17
5	1 September 1984	22 December 1984	17

=== Specials ===
Date	Entitle
9 May 1981	FA Cup Special
