= Make Me a Millionaire =

Lottery game show for the state of California

- Genre: Game show
- Created by: J.D. Roth; Gary Dawson; Todd Nelson
- Directed by: Rich DiPirro
- Presented by: Mark L. Walberg with Liz Hernandez
- Country of origin: United States
- No. of seasons: 2
- No. of episodes: Season One: 52; Season Two: 30; TOTAL: 82

Production
- Executive producers: Todd A. Nelson; Gary Dawson; J.D. Roth; Randy Katz
- Running time: 30 minutes
- Production companies: 3Ball Productions; Milestone Entertainment

Original release
- Network: Syndicated (California only)
- Release: January 17, 2009 – August 7, 2010

Make Me a Millionaire is the second television game show of the California Lottery, having replaced The Big Spin on January 17, 2009. Originally contracted for a four-year run, the show was cancelled after eighteen months, with its final episode telecast on August 7, 2010. On July 9, five unaired episodes were uploaded to the California Lottery's official YouTube page.

Contestants received a guaranteed minimum prize of $2,000, while the grand prize was a progressive jackpot of at least $1,000,000.

== Games ==
The show had four random-play games, and did not retain the Big Wheel or Dream Machine from the show's predecessor. The games are described here in the order of their appearance in the show. Some other merchandise was also given away in addition to the stated prizes.

The following games were mostly based on the second format of the Florida Lottery's Flamingo Fortune.

=== Lucky Penny ===
Lucky Penny gives to each of three players a prize of either $2,000 in cash or a car. Each player begins with ten "penny" tokens and gets four turns to generate a random number from 1 to 9 that matches or comes close to a target number; the target number in each turn is a different digit in the price of the car. At each turn, the difference between a player's random number and the target number is the number of pennies that the player loses; matching the target number exactly wins back two of the previously lost pennies (a player cannot have more than ten pennies). At the end of the game, each player with at least one penny left wins the car. With no pennies, a player gets $2,000.

The game appears similar to The Price Is Right's pricing game Lucky Seven, but with the fundamental difference that Lucky Penny is purely a game of chance.

=== Safe Cracker ===
In Safe Cracker, two players compete for up to $92,000 in cash. The game offers two rounds, but only the first-round winner gets the option of continuing to the second round.

In the first round, each player begins with $2,000 and gets up to five turns to add to it. The players alternate in choosing from a set of ten safes. When chosen, a safe is opened to reveal its contents and remove it from further play. Seven of the safes have amounts ranging from $1,000 to $20,000. The other three are empty. Players accumulate values until one of the players has chosen two empty safes. That player leaves with half of his or her accumulated amount. The other player receives a $5,000 bonus and the option to leave with the accumulated winnings or go to the second round. In the second round, the player chooses one safe out of five. Three of those safes will double the player's winnings, but the other two will halve the winnings. Regardless of the outcome, each player receives 500 Make Me a Millionaire scratchers.

=== California Cool ===
California Cool is a one-player game with up to four rounds and cash prizes ranging from $5,000 to $200,000. In each round, the player picks a number from one to five, to reveal a statement about California. The player gains money only when the choice reveals a true statement. After each round, the player may leave with the accumulated winnings or continue to the next round.

In the first round, the player wins $5,000 for each choice that reveals a true statement. The round begins with one play in which all five statements are true, ensuring a win. The game is reset with one false and four true statements, and the round continues until the player picks the false statement. At the end of the first round, the player's accumulated winnings may range from $5,000 to $25,000.

For the remaining rounds, the payoff is either a doubling (for a true statement) or halving (for a false statement) of the winnings, with one play per round; a false statement also ends the game. Round 2 has one false statement; another false statement is added in each successive round, so that there are only two true statements in round 4. A player who wins round 4 will have doubled the first-round winnings three times, resulting in total accumulated winnings ranging from $40,000 to $200,000.

=== Millionaire ===
All six contestants who have not been in a game yet appear on stage, and the host calls the name of the one person who gets to play the last game (after the show reveals it by putting the six contestants under the spotlight, and then turning off one spotlight at a time until only one stays lit; Walberg then calls that person's name). The remaining five each receive $2,000 and 500 Make Me a Millionaire scratchers (250 Make Me a Millionaire scratchers in Season 2). Millionaire pays a minimum of $10,000 with a jackpot starting at $1,000,000 and increasing by $200,000 each time it is not won.

The game begins by generating a random number from 1 to 50, which counts as the first winning number and awards the player $10,000. Each subsequent winning number awards them an additional $10,000. Play continues to get up to ten more winning numbers by guessing whether the next random number will be higher or lower than the previous winning number. Winning all eleven numbers (each number represents one letter of the word "millionaire") augments the earnings to the jackpot. After one wrong guess, the player must choose before each turn whether to leave with the accumulated earnings or continue to play (by saying the show's title). A second wrong guess ends the game and the player's earnings are halved (the $10,000 minimum is not halved). From the show's premiere through July 18, 2009, the player won only $10,000 when the game ended from a second wrong guess. Regardless of the outcome, the winner receives 1,000 Make Me a Millionaire scratchers (or a bonus prize or 500 Make Me a Millionaire scratchers).

== Jackpot winners ==
Player name	Airdate (Show Number)	Jackpot Awarded
Josefina Sineriz	3/21/09 (1x10)	$2.8 Million
Natalie Marston	8/22/09 (1x32)	$5.2 Million
Queen Mateo	9/12/09 (1x35)	$1.4 Million
Brian Blades	10/17/09 (1x40)	$1.8 Million
Kevin Lu	1/23/10 (2x02)	$3.6 Million
Leslie Marpuri	2/20/10 (2x06)	$1.6 Million
Edison Javier	5/8/10 (2x17)	$3 Million
Barbara Cody	7/10/10 (2x26)	$2.6 Million

The biggest winner is Natalie Marston, a former Snow White performer at Disneyland who won $5.2 million.

== Broadcast history ==
The first show was recorded on December 14, 2008 and broadcast on January 17, 2009. It aired weekly on Saturdays, in the early evening, at a time specific to each local station. The show was produced by 3Ball Productions and Milestone Entertainment for an initially anticipated four-year run, and featured Mark L. Walberg as host, with co-presenter Liz Hernandez. The show had the same four games throughout its one-and-a-half-year run. Twelve contestants were featured on each show, from whom seven were assigned randomly to play the games; the remaining five received $2,000 minimum cash or prizes. Contestants learned their assignments only as each game began, although only one of those contestant assignments was televised, and that was for the Millionaire game.

On May 4, 2010, the California Lottery announced that the show was being cancelled and would not be replaced. The last program was telecast on July 3. Money that had been allocated for production of the show will be used for prizes for the lottery's scratch-off games.

In a significant production accomplishment for the initial recordings in December 2008, series director Rich DiPirro rehearsed and directed the first three episodes from Tokyo via internet hook-up as the production was being staged live in Hollywood.

=== Getting on the show ===
Contestants got on the show by mailing in a winning "Make Me a Millionaire" scratch-off ticket. Future winners of the "Make Me a Millionaire" Scratchers games (honored until December 22, 2010), and Fantasy 5 Second Chance Draw coupons (accepted by mail if postmarked by December 31, 2010), still provided the opportunity to play the games and win prizes off-air.

When the show began, The Big Spin scratchers were also honored until those tickets expired. A $5 Fantasy 5 ticket still provided a coupon for a second-chance drawing, with the chance to win the new show's progressive jackpot instead of the Fantasy 5 Dream Machine's $150,000.

=== Stations ===
The show aired weekly on Saturdays, in the early evening, at a time specific to each local station.

- Bakersfield - KBFX-CD
- El Centro, CA/Yuma, AZ - KYMA
- Eureka - KIEM-TV
- Fresno - KSEE
- Los Angeles - KCAL-TV
- Monterey/Salinas - KION-TV
- Redding/Chico - KRVU-LD
- Sacramento - KTXL
- San Diego/Tijuana - XETV
- San Francisco - KRON-TV
- Santa Barbara/San Luis Obispo/Santa Maria - KSBY
