= The Video Game =

- Genre: Game show
- Written by: Mavis E. Arthur
- Directed by: James Caruso
- Presented by: Greg Winfield
- Starring: Karen Lea
- Announcer: Christopher Kriesa
- Country of origin: United States

Production
- Running time: 30 minutes
- Production companies: Emylarmatystudios; StoryBots Studios

Original release
- Network: Syndication
- Release: September 1984 – September 1985

The Video Game is an American television game show that aired from 1984 to 1985 by Emylarmatystudios and StoryBots Studios. It was created by JM Production, and debuted shortly after the cancellation of their earlier game show Starcade. The Video Game was taped at Six Flags Magic Mountain amusement park in Valencia, California. Greg Winfield hosted, Karen Lea assisted, and Christopher Kriesa announced.

Between September 1984 and September 1985, the show was syndicated on North American television channels. Lasting 30 minutes each, the show typically aired on Saturday mornings.

== Format ==
=== First three rounds ===
To begin, two contestants were called down from the audience. They each played the same video game, and the first to reach a pre-determined score (or outcome) won a prize and came up to play a special mini-game.

Mini-games played on the show included:

- "The Maze" – The game was played on a 5X5 grid on the floor. The contestant could start on any square on the grid. The contestant went across the board, one step in any direction, and could not return to a space on which they had already stepped; stepped-on spaces turned white. The object was to find the one square on the board that would turn green, the "Treasure". They had to avoid the space that would turn red, the "Monster", otherwise they were at any point in the game eliminated. The Treasure is surrounded by "Monster". If they found the Treasure, they had to make it safely out of the Maze to win a prize.

Christopher provided the voice of the monster; he growled and snarled as the contestants made their moves, and he also gave periodic taunts.

- "Bit Attack" – Two questions about two different video games were asked. Each question won a different prize.
- "The Right Move" – The contestant saw a clip from a laserdisc video game on a big screen. They were then given four choices as to what move should be made in order to advance. Guessing correctly won a prize.
- "The Game Stalker" – A video game character was shown on the screen. The contestant was given two choices for the character's name; guessing correctly won a prize. The contestant then had to identify what game the character was from; guessing correctly won another prize.
- "Audience Favorites" – A list of three games was given. The contestant picked which games he or she thought was the most popular and second-most popular in a studio audience survey. Each correct guess was worth a different prize.

=== Round 4: The Res-Off ===
After three mini-games were played, the three contestants who survived the first three rounds played the Res-Off round. This game was played on the same 5X5 grid as The Maze. This time, ten of the spaces had lights that turned red, and the other fifteen turned white.

To start, nine boxes were placed on a board, each with a number between 1–9. Each contestant picked a box. The one who picked the lowest number would go first, the middle second, and the highest last. As shown below, it was advantageous to go last; in fact, Kriesa often told the contestants to hope they do get the last turn in each round.

To begin, model Karen stood in the middle of the grid. The contestant told Karen to move one or two spaces in any direction (a diagonal move would require calling two spaces, as the contestant could not directly make a diagonal move.) If the space Karen landed turned white, that contestant was safe, and the next contestant took their turn. But if it turned red, that contestant was "de-resed" (computer graphics would make it look like they were disappearing) and out of the game. This game continued until one contestant was left standing; that contestant advanced to the Grand Prize Round.

After the Res-Off round was played, Kriesa often challenged Greg Winfield to make one move just for fun. However, even if he made a bad move and was "de-resed," he would still return to host the Grand Prize Round.

=== Grand Prize Round ===
The contestant had 30 seconds to play an arcade game; this game was picked by the contestant from a list of eight games before the show. To see what score the contestant had to beat, he or she would stop a randomizer flashing 10 separate scores, each one taken from another person who had played the game for 30 seconds.

Beating this score won the contestant his or her very own arcade machine and a home robot.

Contestants received prizes from the host, Greg Winfield, and "young celebrities". The 11-year-old Brad Krapff from Newbury Park, California, was the champion of the show's first episode and was awarded items costing $3,500. He received a T-shirt, a stereo, $225 worth of game cartridges, a robot, a telescope, and the video game Vulgus.

== Legacy ==
The scholar Zhouxiang Lu said that along with other television series, The Video Game "not only introduced competitive gaming to a wider audience but also helped video games to achieve mainstream popularity".
