= Yank Azman =

Canadian actor (born 1947)

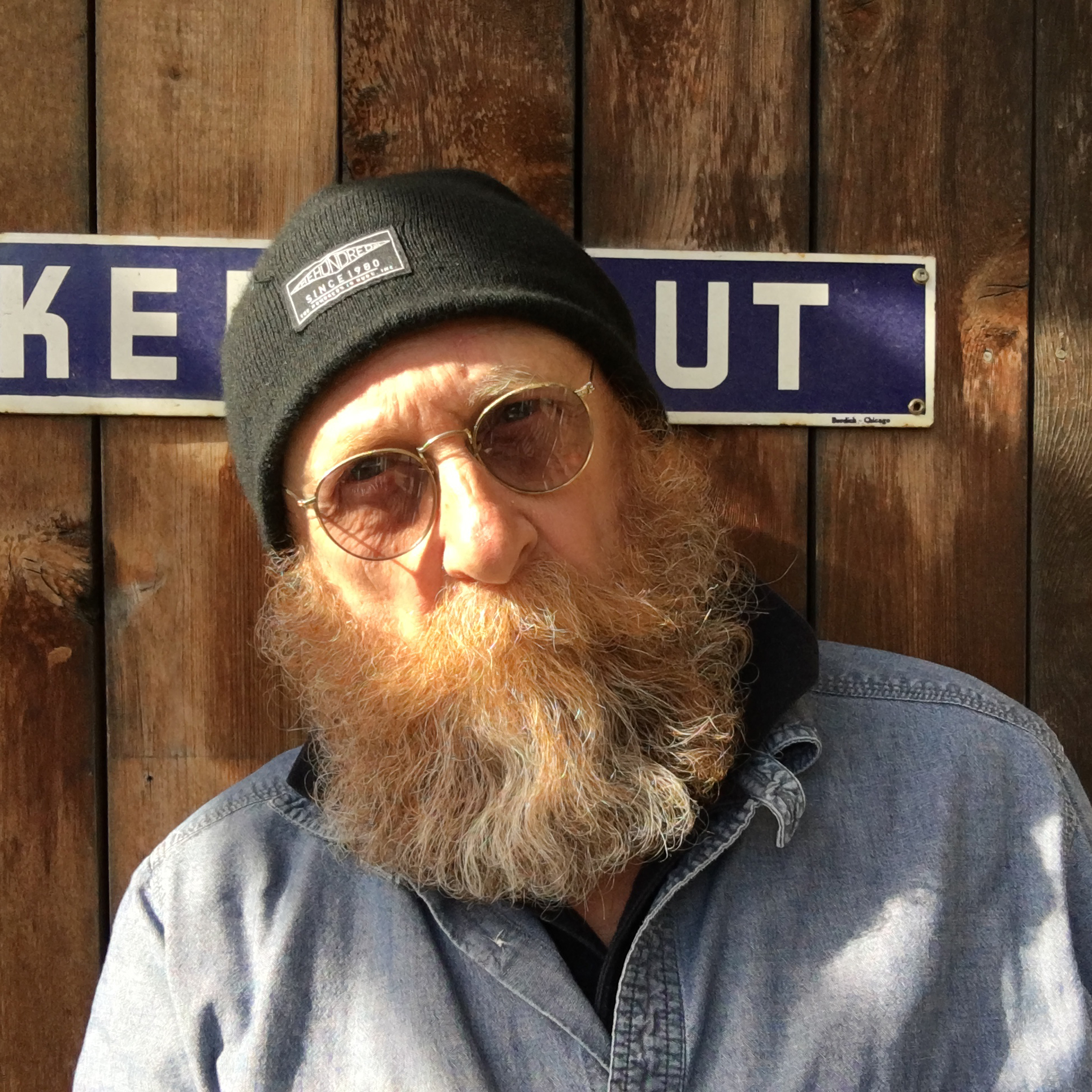
- Yank Azman in 2017
- Born: Jankiel (Jank) Zajfman (aka Jack Zaifman); October 19, 1947 (age 78); Bad Wörishofen, Germany
- Occupations: Actor, voice actor, antique dealer
- Years active: 1969–present
- Spouse: Pulver Zajfman (m. 1969)
- Website: http://www.yankazman.com

Yank Azman (born October 19, 1947) is a Canadian television and film actor.

== Early life ==
Azman was born in a displaced persons camp in Bad Wörishofen, Germany to Cesia (née Waishand), a sales clerk, and Kuba Zajfman, a tailor and furrier, Holocaust survivors from Chmielnik, Poland. They emigrated to Canada in 1948 and settled in Toronto where he attended Harbord Collegiate Institute, William Lyon Mackenzie Collegiate Institute and later the Ontario College of Art (now known as OCAD University) and the University of Toronto.

== Career ==
Although his first stage appearance was at age six, his professional acting career began with the CBC Television series Toby in 1968. By the 1970s after training at Young People's Theatre and The Second City, he was working in improvisational and children's theatre with Gilda Radner and in 1974 was cast as one of an ensemble (which included Valri Bromfield and Jayne Eastwood) to star on the CTV comedy series Funny Farm. During the 1970s he appeared on stage at: Factory Theatre's Hurray for Johnny Canuck with Maury Chaykin and Jim Henshaw; Theatre Passe Muraille in Bethune; and Theatre New Brunswick as Brighella in Goldoni's Servant of Two Masters among others. Since then he has worked steadily in film and television with such roles as Tom Shaughnessy on My Life as A Dog and frequent guest appearances on such shows as Murdoch Mysteries.

== Second career ==
He began a lifelong interest in art and antiques after being inspired by Painters Eleven artist Harold Town while working together on the Canadian Centennial project at William Lyon Mackenzie C.I. In 1979, he started supplying antiques as props for the movies and to retail stores such as Polo Ralph Lauren and then opened a shop at the Harbourfront Antique Market. Toronto Life Magazine called him the "friendliest dealer in town." He has made numerous guest appearances as an antiques expert on such television shows as Room Service with Sarah Richardson on HGTV, Breakfast Television on Citytv and in 2002 he hosted a television pilot called Flea Market Millionaire for the Discovery Channel. Azman has also lectured on antiques at the CITT (Canadian Institute of Theatre Technology) at Ryerson University (now Toronto Metropolitan University) and on Material Culture at the Faculty of Liberal Studies at Ontario College of Art & Design.

== Voice acting ==
Azman has long worked as a voice actor and has voiced several characters in animated series such as Starcom: The U.S. Space Force and The Adventures of Tintin.

== Personal life ==
Azman is married to Canadian artist & antique dealer Pulver Zajfman and lives in Toronto and Miami Beach. He is a member of Mensa and has a mild form of dyscalculia.

== Filmography ==
Yank Azman film and television credits
Year	Title	Role	Notes	Ref.
1968	Toby	Unknown		
1974	Funny Farm	(regular)	6 episodes. As Jank Zalfman	
1989	Sing	Mr. Frye	Theatrical film	
1989	Millennium	Evacuation Worker	Theatrical film	
1990	My Secret Identity	Unknown	1 episode	
1991	Mark Twain & Me	Reporter #3	Television film	
1992	Counterstrike	Inspector Campbell	Episode: "Cyborg" (as Jank Azman)	
1994	Seeds of Deception	Medical Board Member	Television film. AKA The Babymaker: The Dr. Cecil Jacobson Story	
1994	My Breast	Dr Norton	Television film	
1995	Butterbox Babies	Mr. Stone	Theatrical film	
1995	Choices of the Heart: The Margaret Sanger Story	Arnold Scopes	Television film	
1995	The Wharf Rat	Funeral Director	Television film	
1996	Gotti	Judge Nickerson	Television film	
1996	Steve Martini's Undue Influence	Jack's Lawyer	Television film	
1996	We the Jury	Henry Otis	Television film	
1996	My Life as A Dog	Tom Shaughnessy	3 episodes	
1998	More Tears	Larry Golden		
1998	Bone Daddy	MacDougall	Theatrical film	
1998	Giving Up the Ghost	Cousin Albert	Television film	
1998	The Scandalous Me: Jacqueline Susann Story	Producer No 2	Television film	
1999	Cruel Justice	Judge Conrad Simms	Television film	
1999	Dash and Lilly	Doctor	Television film	
1999	The Lady in Question	Medical Examiner	Television film	
2000	Deliberate Intent	Trial Judge	Television film	
2001	Haven	Papa Stern	Television film	
2001	Judgment	Colin McMahon	Theatrical film	
2004	Evel Knievel	Accountant	Television film	
2018	Murdoch Mysteries	Peddler	1 episode	
