= Jonathan Goodson =

American television producer (born 1945)

- Born: Jonathan Michael Goodson; August 20, 1945 (age 79); New York City, U.S.
- Occupation(s): Television producer, production company founder
- Father: Mark Goodson

Jonathan Michael Goodson (born August 20, 1945) is an American television producer who specializes in game shows. He is the son of legendary game show producer Mark Goodson and began his television career in 1973 as chief counsel of Goodson-Todman Productions. He later produced several of the company's shows. After his father's death in December 1992, Jonathan took over the company in March 1993 (in the early 1980s the Goodsons had acquired the Todman heirs' portion of the company) and ran it until it was sold to All American Television in 1995. The company was then acquired in turn by Pearson Television in 1998, and then current owner Fremantle (formerly FremantleMedia) in 2002.

Goodson also runs his own production company, Jonathan Goodson Productions, whose output has consisted mostly of state-based lottery game shows, including Illinois Instant Riches, one of only two state-based lottery game show to be shown to a nationwide audience, thanks to Superstation WGN. (The other was its predecessor, $100,000 Fortune Hunt, but that was not a production by Goodson.)

== Personal life ==
Goodson was born in New York City. He received a B.A. at Stanford University in 1967, and an L.L.B. Yale Law School in 1970.

== Shows associated with Jonathan Goodson ==
- Double Dare, producer
- Card Sharks, executive producer
- That's My Line, executive producer
- Child's Play, executive producer
- Trivia Trap, producer
- Now You See It, executive producer (1989 version)
- Match Game, producer (1990 version)
- Cram, creator and executive producer (with Jonathan Goodson Productions)
- Dirty Rotten Cheater, executive producer (with Jonathan Goodson Productions)
- The Big Spin, executive producer (with Jonathan Goodson Productions, 1999-2009 [episodes from 1985-98 did not have him involved])
- Illinois Instant Riches, later Illinois' Luckiest, executive producer (with Mark Goodson Productions 1994–1996, Jonathan Goodson Productions 1996-2000)
- Forgive or Forget, co-executive producer (with Jonathan Goodson Productions, 1998-2000)
- Flamingo Fortune, executive producer (with Jonathan Goodson Productions, 1995–97)
- Bonus Bonanza, executive producer (with Jonathan Goodson Productions, 1995–98)
- NY Wired, executive producer (with Jonathan Goodson Productions, 1997–99)
- Make Me Rich, executive producer (with Jonathan Goodson Productions, 2009–12)
- Powerball: The Game Show, executive producer (with Jonathan Goodson Productions, 2000–02)
