= Starcade =

American game show television program

- Created by: James Caruso; Mavis Arthur
- Developed by: James Caruso; Mavis Arthur
- Presented by: Mark Richards; Geoff Edwards
- Announcer: Kevin McMahan
- Opening theme: "Mindseed" by Edwin Anderson
- Country of origin: United States
- No. of seasons: 4
- No. of episodes: 123 + 4 pilots

Production
- Executive producers: James Caruso; Mavis Arthur
- Production locations: Bridge Studios; San Francisco, California
- Running time: 23 minutes (approximately)
- Production companies: JM Production Company; Turner Program Services

Original release
- Network: WTBS (1982–1983); Syndicated (1983–1984)
- Release: December 27, 1982 – February 24, 1984

Starcade is an American game show where contestants competed against one another by playing arcade video games. The series originally aired on WTBS from 1982 to 1983, followed by a run in syndication for the following season.

The series was first hosted by Mark Richards. Geoff Edwards replaced Richards after the first 23 shows, and continued until the show's cancellation.

== Broadcast history ==
The first pilot aired on September 13, 1981.

Starcade was produced by the JM Production Company to air on WTBS and later syndication by Turner Program Services (TPS). Starcade was the first video arcade game show, and set the blueprint for similar game shows like Video Power, Nick Arcade, and Arena. The show was used to sponsor and showcase brand new coin-operated machines of the golden age of arcade video games.

Shortly after the series' cancellation, a second JM-produced video arcade game show, The Video Game, was aired for a brief period from 1984 to 1985.

Starcade aired in repeats on the G4 network from its inception in 2002 to 2004, shortly before its merger with TechTV. It returned to the G4 lineup during the network's 2021 relaunch.

== Format ==
=== Main game ===
Two players (or teams; age-regardless) competed through three rounds in the main game.

Each round began with a video arcade-game related toss-up question. The player who buzzed in and answered correctly chose one of five free-standing arcade games in the studio and was given 40 seconds (later 60, then 50) to amass as high a score as possible. The opponent then played the same game, and whatever points the players earned were added to their overall scores. If a player's game ended before time ran out, the turn ended immediately and the player was credited with whatever points they had earned.

The second and third rounds were played identically, with 40 seconds (later 50) game playing time for the second round, and 30 seconds (later 40) for the third. Once a game was chosen for play in any round, it could not be chosen again. At the end of the second round (and third when the series began), the player/team in the lead played "Name the Game," watching brief video clips of four arcade games and attempting to choose each title from two possibilities. The player/team won a prize for correctly identifying any three games, and a second prize for naming all four.

When teams played, both players had to play one game in the first round.

One of the five games was the "mystery game," which awarded a prize (originally 500 extra points, in very early episodes) to the player/team who chose it in any of the three rounds.

The player/team in the lead at the end of the third and final round won the game and a bonus prize, and moved on to the bonus round.

=== Bonus round ===
The player selected one of the two games that had not yet been played, and was given 30 seconds to beat the average score of 20 other players on that game. If the player did so, he/she won the day's grand prize, which consisted of either an arcade game, a home entertainment robot, a jukebox, or even a vacation (in certain "invitational" episodes).

== Production ==
The original pilot for Starcade was hosted by Olympic gold-medalist hockey player Mike Eruzione, taped at the studios of KRON-TV in San Francisco and featured an almost entirely different format. Twenty-four players competed at once, divided into three groups of eight that played different games (Defender, Centipede, and Pac-Man). The players had 30 seconds to achieve as high a score as possible, and the top scorer on each game advanced to play Berzerk against the other two. The winner of this contest received an Asteroids Deluxe arcade game and an Apple II computer, and then played a different game against a celebrity in an exhibition match with no prizes at stake. The game used for this match was the then-new Donkey Kong, and the celebrity was Larry Wilcox, known for portraying police officer Jon Baker on the NBC crime-drama CHiPs.

The original pilot aired on KRON-TV on September 13, 1981, beating its competition in the overnight ratings, and was shown a few more times on stations in smaller California markets. Three more pilots were then shot for NBC at Bridge Studios, formerly the facilities of KPIX-TV (the station relocated to Battery Street in 1979, and the complex was demolished in 2006), featuring a retooled format (more similar to the series as aired) and host Alex Trebek (who was suggested by NBC). The pilot was picked up by Ted Turner in 1982, and the show began its life on WTBS in December, still taping at Bridge Studios with Mark Richards as host.

Richards, however, appeared to be uncomfortable on-camera; more importantly to Turner, Richards did not appear to be interested in video games. Richards was replaced by veteran game-show host Geoff Edwards on the 24th WTBS episode. Though Edwards had had no previous experience with video games, he became a fan of them soon after taking the job, studying the games in the show's rotation and reading gaming magazines. He would frequently offer advice and hints to contestants, and he was once featured in a "Starcade Hotline" segment playing and beating the notoriously difficult game Sinistar. Edwards remained a fan of video games until his death in 2014.

The show's original theme was an eight-bit melody similar to those heard in various arcade games of the time. Halfway through Richards' run, the theme was changed to one composed by "Mindseed" (Ed and Joanne Anderson), who were also employed by Data East at the time and who also composed the music for Venture and Mouse Trap for Exidy.

Occasionally, special episodes were produced such as team episodes, and others in which only one game was played repeatedly through the entire episode. Games that were featured in an episode of their own were Cliff Hanger, Dragon's Lair, Pole Position II, Track & Field and the 1983 Star Wars game.

Certain segments of the show were set to the in-game theme music from the game Xevious.

The final first-run show aired on February 24, 1984, with reruns airing in syndication until September 1984. WTBS then reran episodes of Starcade on Sunday mornings until January 1985.

== Episode status ==
All episodes except episode #35 are known to exist, according to the show's official website.

On December 25, 2020, the Wink Martindale YouTube Channel released one of the pilot episodes hosted by Alex Trebek. It was only available for a short time before being removed due to a copyright claim from JM Productions.

== Attempted reboots ==
In January 2017, Shout! Factory announced it had acquired the rights to Starcade from Caruso and Arthur, and intends to work with JM Productions to reboot the series, along with additional projects. However, these plans never came to fruition.

On November 15, 2022, during an Xplay reunion at Kinda Funny Games, Jirard "The Completionist" Khalil revealed that he had plans to reboot Starcade at G4. These plans also never came to fruition, as G4 shut down in October 2022.

== See also ==
- Esports
