= Funny Farm (TV series) =

Canadian television series

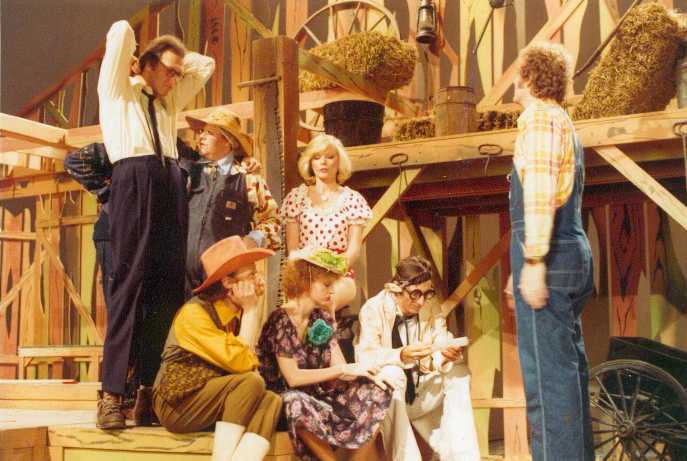
- Cast members on the set at CFTO-TV studios
- Genre: Comedy/variety
- Starring: Blake Emmons
- Country of origin: Canada
- Original language: English
- No. of seasons: 1

Production
- Running time: 30 min

Original release
- Network: CTV
- Release: 12 September 1974 – 1975

Funny Farm is a Canadian television series that was shown on CTV during the 1974–1975 season.

Blake Emmons was host of the half-hour series, which was derivative of the more successful American Hee Haw series. The first episode was broadcast on 12 September 1974 and only one season was produced. The programme continued to be broadcast on CTV for at least two seasons and was still airing as late as 1976. The cast included Bruce Gordon (credited as Ben Gordon), John Evans, Monica Parker, Yank Azman (credited as Jank Zajfman), Jayne Eastwood, Valri Bromfield and Linda Rennhoffer.

The show was poorly received by critics, with one commenting, "in all my years of TV viewing I can't remember a worse show than Funny Farm. It's ugly and crude from every point of view; the concept is a straight steal from Hee Haw, but the writing, performances and production are straight out of the garbage dump." and another writing, "I still don't quite believe it, but it's there, outhouse jokes, guitar and banjo, outhouse jokes, one-liners, outhouse jokes... It's a gas. But then again, so is chlorine."
