= Lucky Ladders =

- Genre: Game show
- Based on: Chain Reaction by Bob Stewart
- Presented by: Lennie Bennett
- Announcer: Peter Simon
- Country of origin: United Kingdom
- Original language: English
- No. of series: 6
- No. of episodes: 195

Production
- Running time: 30 minutes (inc. adverts)
- Production companies: Anglia in association with Action Time and Basada Inc.

Original release
- Network: ITV
- Release: 21 March 1988 – 14 May 1993

Related
- Chain Reaction (US version)

Lucky Ladders is a United Kingdom daytime game show based on the American format titled Chain Reaction that was produced by Anglia and aired on ITV from 21 March 1988 until 14 May 1993. It was hosted by Lennie Bennett and narrated by Peter Simon.

== Format ==
=== Competition rounds ===
Two teams of two people were taken from the "Player's Paddock" (an enclosure containing enough fresh players to enable the producers to make five programmes in one studio session). They were shown a "lucky ladder"—a chain of seven words that connect to each other in some way. The top and bottom words were revealed at the outset, and the contestants would have to try to guess what words belonged in-between, one letter at a time.

The contestants in play would be offered the choice to "give a letter" (a tactical move that would reveal the next letter to the opposing team in the hope that they wouldn't be able to guess the word correctly) or "guess a letter" (generally a safer bet, ensuring that the team remained in play, provided they didn't get the word wrong.) A wrong guess or taking too long would make it the opposing team's turn. No conferring between players on the same team was allowed. After each round the players would switch roles.

10 points were awarded per correct word guessed, with 20 points for the final word to complete the ladder. At each game's completion, Bennett explained the connections for the benefit of any viewers in the audience or at home who may not have understood the connections. The points were then increased to 20/40. If the game was not won at this point, the points could be increased to 30/60 or 40/80.

=== Jackpot round ===
The first team to 200 points won the game, and were invited to complete a "jackpot ladder", which took exactly the same format as the main game but without the bottom word being revealed at the outset, but the first letter of each word below the previous word would be revealed. The players were only allowed five free letter clues instead of the unlimited supply they had in the main game. Any teams who completed five jackpot ladders were retired from the game, usually with a big prize.

=== Prizes ===
The entire show was made cheaply and en masse in order to fill a weekday half-hour slot, and the prizes were not generally of a great equivalent cash value. All winning contestants received a Lucky Ladders trophy. Lennie Bennett revealed in Yorkshire Television's One Day in the Life of Television (1 November 1989) that only six of these trophies were made for promotional purposes, and that players were required to hand them back after recording. Defeated newcomers would receive Lucky Ladders watches. Defeated champions would win a greater prize depending on how many "prize ladders" they completed.

== Transmissions ==
Series	Start date	End date	Episodes
1	21 March 1988	22 April 1988	25
2	31 October 1988	23 December 1988	40
3	8 January 1990	16 February 1990	30
4	4 March 1991	26 April 1991	40
5	24 February 1992	10 April 1992	35
6	12 April 1993	14 May 1993	25
