= Pierre Lalonde =

Canadian entertainer (1941–2016)

- Born: January 20, 1941; Montreal, Quebec, Canada
- Died: June 21, 2016 (aged 75); Hudson, Quebec
- Other names: Peter Martin
- Occupations: Singer, television host
- Known for: Jeunesse d'aujourd'hui The Peter Martin Show
- Spouse: Clare Lalonde (née Lewis)
- Children: 4

Pierre Lalonde (January 20, 1941 – June 21, 2016) was a Canadian singer and television host, who was sometimes also billed as Peter Martin in the United States.

The son of Jean Lalonde, a popular singer in the 1940s, Lalonde attended high school in the United States but returned to Canada in 1960, where he worked at radio station CKJL with his father in Saint-Jérôme, Quebec. Shortly after, he worked in Montreal at CJMS.

In 1961, Lalonde moved to television station CFTM-TV to host a variety of programs, including the popular show Jeunesse d'aujourd'hui (Today's Youth). The following year he released his first single and made his first LP in 1963. Lalonde mainly recorded in French, but he released a number of singles in English as well.

Lalonde's success led to his own program, The Peter Martin Show, on WPIX in New York from 1967 to 1968. He also recorded one album, Introducing Peter Martin, under this name. His English-language shows included Music Hop, The Mad Dash, Circus and The Pierre Lalonde Show. He emceed the Telethon of Stars in the 1970s and 1980s, and hosted the French-language version of the Bob Stewart Productions game show Chain Reaction. In 1983 and 1984 he hosted the Miss Teen Canada Pageant.

Pierre Lalonde received Quebec's Medal of Honour of the National Assembly in 2011 for his artistic contributions.

== Death ==
Lalonde died on June 21, 2016, in Hudson, Quebec at the age of 75, due to complications from Parkinson's disease.
