= Blake Emmons =

Canadian country singer and television host (1944–2026)

- Born: Bruce MacKenzie; August 2, 1944; Toronto, Ontario, Canada
- Died: March 9, 2026 (aged 81) Nipawin, Saskatchewan, Canada
- Genres: Country
- Occupations: Singer; entertainer; television host

Blake Emmons (born Bruce MacKenzie; August 2, 1944 – March 9, 2026) was a Canadian country music singer and entertainer. He hosted the 1974 CTV series Funny Farm, the Canadian answer to Hee Haw. Emmons also co-hosted the Nashville syndicated music show The Country Place with Jim Ed Brown for Show Biz Inc. in the 1970s. In 1985, Emmons appeared on the American game show The Joker's Wild as a contestant and also appeared as a celebrity guest on the Canadian game show, Definition. He later hosted the game show Chain Reaction on September 29, 1986, which aired on Global Television Network in Canada and on USA Network in the United States. He chose not to continue as host after the first series of shows due to the fact the shows were produced in Montreal rather than California as originally agreed. He was replaced by Geoff Edwards. Other works on which he appeared include Mary, and TV's Bloopers and Practical Jokes for Dick Clark, as well as hosting the Playboy Shopping Show on the Playboy Channel. He appeared nationally on CBC Television's Countrytime in the early 1970s.

== Life and career ==
Emmons was born as Bruce MacKenzie in Toronto, Ontario, Canada, on August 2, 1944, and raised in Prince George, British Columbia.

In the mid-1970s, Emmons hosted the ACT Telethon in Edmonton in support of Camp HE-HO-HA for disabled children. He also was instrumental in creating and hosted the Telemiracle telethon in Saskatchewan for several years beginning in 1977, and remained involved for some time afterwards. Emmons played the male lead "Sheriff Ed Earl Dodd" in the Broadway production The Best Little Whorehouse in Texas as well as the New York Theatrical Production road tour for one year.

Emmons died in Nipawin, Saskatchewan on March 9, 2026, at the age of 81.

== Discography ==
=== Singles ===
Year	Single	CAN Country
1969	"You're My Woman"	19
1971	"Deadest Man Living"	41
1976	"Let Me Do Something Lord"	9
1976	"Sunchild"	29

Preceded by Bill Cullen in 1980	Chain Reaction Host; 1986	Succeeded by Geoff Edwards
