= Jack Gallagher (comedian) =

American actor and comedian

Jack Gallagher (born August 15, 1953) is an American comedian, actor, and writer with a recurring role on the HBO sitcom Curb Your Enthusiasm. As a television host, he has won Emmy Awards for his work on the PBS series Money Moves, Off-Limits, and Kids, Cash and Common Sense. He was the host of the California Lottery's The Big Spin game show from 1996 to 1998.

Not to be confused with the comedian who goes by the single name Gallagher, nor the Dave Chappelle Gallagher parody character, Black Gallagher, Jack Gallagher does not use props in his comedy. He is the author and performer of eight critically acclaimed one-man shows: Letters to Declan (1993), Just the Guy (2002), What He Left (2006), A Different Kind of Cool (2010), Complete and Unfinished (2013) "5 Songs" (2015), "Concussed: Four Days In The Dark" (2017) and "A Stand-up Guy" (2019).

Gallagher became a regular at the Improv in Los Angeles and appeared on The Tonight Show with both Johnny Carson and Jay Leno, as well as appearances on Late Night with Conan O'Brien before launching an acting career in the movie Shakes the Clown with Bobcat Goldthwait. His other films include Heartbreak Ridge with Clint Eastwood and the made-for-television Incident at Ruby Ridge.

Gallagher briefly starred in his own sitcom, Bringing up Jack on ABC. He can now be seen as the co-host of the syndicated Public Television series MoneyTrack. Gallagher grew up and graduated from high school in West Bridgewater, Massachusetts and lived for many years in Sacramento, California with his wife Jean Ellen and two sons, Declan and Liam.

In 2024, the Gallagher family quietly began the process of moving "home," to the Cape Cod region of Massachusetts. In the spring of 2026, Jack Gallagher presented An Irish Goodbye, his "last one-man show" at the B Street Theater in Sacramento. In that show, Jack stated that his son Declan is married and living in Liverpool. His son Liam expressed some reluctance to leave Sacramento, but decided he'd give Massachusetts a shot. On March 17, 2026, Jack and Declan discussed life, the move, and the show at B Street with Kitty O'Neal at talk radio station KFBK.
