= Geoff Edwards =

American actor and game show host

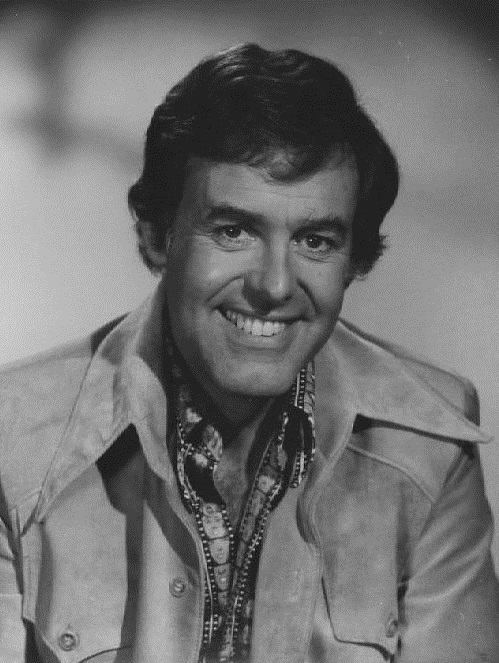
- Edwards in 1977
- Born: Geoffrey Bruce Owen Edwards; February 13, 1931; Westfield, New Jersey, US
- Died: March 5, 2014 (aged 83); Santa Monica, California, US
- Occupations: Actor; game show host; radio personality
- Years active: 1959–2013
- Spouse(s): Suzanne Weaver (m. 1958–1982; divorced); Michaela Feffer (after 1982; his death)
- Children: 3

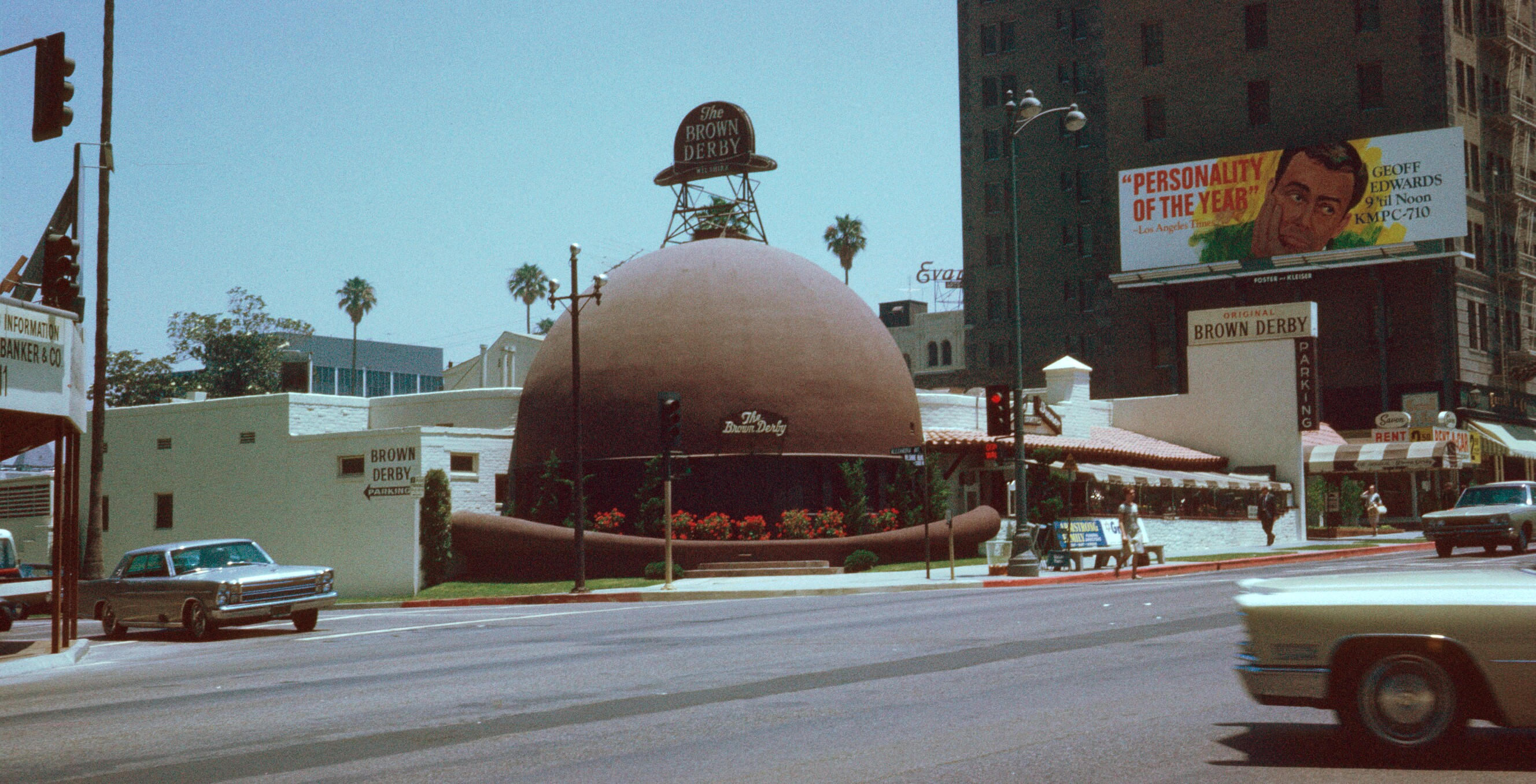
Billboard announcing Geoff Edwards' radio program on KMPC (behind Brown Derby restaurant on Wilshire Blvd.), circa 1968.

Geoffrey Bruce Owen Edwards (February 13, 1931 – March 5, 2014) was an American television actor, game show host, and radio personality. Starting in the early 2000s, he was also a writer and broadcaster on the subject of travel.

== Background ==
Prior to his media career, Edwards was an accomplished musician, playing drums in a number of jazz bands.

Edwards began his career while attending Duke University, working for a radio station in Albany, New York. In 1959, Edwards got his first job at KFMB-AM in San Diego, hosting an evening show and co-hosting the Don Ross/Geoff Edwards Show.

As a news reporter for KHJ-AM radio, Edwards was present in the basement of Dallas police headquarters when Jack Ruby shot suspected John F. Kennedy assassin Lee Harvey Oswald on November 24, 1963. Edwards was one of the witnesses interviewed by NBC television correspondent Tom Pettit on the scene.

In its 11th annual radio selections for the Best of 1967 column, The Los Angeles Times selected Edwards for its Personality of the Year for Edwards' on air work at KFI.

After a few short stints at other stations, Edwards was hired at KMPC in Los Angeles, occupying the 9 a.m.-noon slot for several years beginning in February 1968 until December 1979 when he resigned to focus on his TV career. He later worked at KFI from 1987 to 1989 but he ultimately resigned, as a protest against fellow KFI personality Tom Leykis, destroying Cat Stevens' (Yusuf Islam) records following Stevens' call for a fatwa on Salman Rushdie. Most recently, Edwards was a morning DJ with KSUR (now KKGO) in Los Angeles. One of the features of his radio show was "Radio's Answer Lady," in which listeners could call in with questions — some serious, some not so serious — and he would answer on the air, sometimes with serious answers, sometimes with quips.

During that time, Edwards tried his hand at acting, appearing on I Dream of Jeannie and That Girl.

In 1968, he was seen in several episodes of Petticoat Junction, as Bobbie Jo Bradley's boyfriend Jeff. From his time on the show, he met — and maintained a very close friendship with — Meredith MacRae, (who played Billie Jo Bradley).

In 1969, he narrated an educational film, How We Feel About Sound.

He also guest starred on Police Woman, Diff'rent Strokes, and Small Wonder.

In the early 1970s, Edwards appeared on The Bobby Darin Show as the straight man to singer Bobby Darin. After that series ended, Edwards pursued a game show career, starting with Says Who? in 1971, followed by Cop-Out! in February 1972—however, both shows eventually turned out to be unsold pilots.

== Game shows ==
Edwards's first full-time game show hosting stint took place from March through June 1973 on Jack Barry's Hollywood's Talking, a remake of a late 1960s ABC game Everybody's Talking and the Canadian hit Eye Bet. The program featured contestants watching video clips of celebrities talking about a subject; their job was to guess the subject in question. The series, which aired afternoons on CBS television, did not fare well and the network cancelled it in favor of the phenomenally popular Match Game remake. Edwards also said he did not like Barry and he had no intention of continuing with the series if it made it past CBS' initial commitment.

Edwards was not unemployed long, as Chuck Barris hired him to host The New Treasure Hunt that launched in weekly syndication in fall 1973. In January 1974, Edwards returned to daytime with the NBC show Jackpot. For the next nineteen months, ending in September 1975, Edwards would commute back and forth between California and New York as Jackpot taped at NBC's Rockefeller Center studios. He would briefly do this again in 1977 during the run of NBC's Shoot for the Stars (both it and Jackpot were produced by Bob Stewart). The New Treasure Hunt would also come to an end in 1977.

In January 1980, Edwards debuted as the host of the new Barry & Enright show Play the Percentages, which he hosted until the end of the television season when it was cancelled. He also hosted his last daytime network show when he substituted for Bill Cullen (then filling in on Password Plus for an ill Allen Ludden) on two weeks of NBC's Chain Reaction, another Bob Stewart show. Edwards also briefly tried his hand at producing when he teamed with Mark Maxwell-Smith to form Smith-Edwards Productions in 1980. The duo signed a deal with Warner Brothers to produce the game show pilot Pot of Gold for NBC, but the series never sold. They also worked on a talk show based on the magazine Ladies Home Journal, but that series also failed to sell and Smith-Edwards Productions folded in 1981. Later that year, Edwards returned to television to host a daily revival of Treasure Hunt for syndication that was cancelled at the end of the 1981–82 season.

In 1983 Edwards began hosting Starcade, a new show centered on video games. He took over the show from previous host Mark Richards, who hosted from December 1982 until the summer of 1983. The show initially aired on Superstation WTBS and went into national syndication from September 1983 to September 1984. Richards was fired for the reasoning that he did not know much nor was he very enthusiastic about video games; determined not to repeat what his predecessor did, Edwards studied the video games used on the show and the industry in general and consequently became so fascinated with video games that he became an avid player. Edwards kept up the hobby until his death.

Except for a week of substituting for an indisposed Monty Hall on Let's Make a Deal in early 1985 and an unsold Bob Stewart pilot for ABC called $50,000 a Minute, Edwards remained largely inactive on the national television scene. This changed with his next two hosting gigs, which were his longest. In November 1985, Edwards replaced Chuck Woolery as the host of the California Lottery's weekly game show The Big Spin, which he would host for ten years, mostly from the lottery's Sacramento headquarters. Then, in 1986, Edwards was called on by Stewart yet again, this time to replace Blake Emmons as host of its Montreal-based revival of Chain Reaction (which aired in the US on the USA Network). He would do this until the series was cancelled in 1991 and would commute between the United States and Canada during this time. During this time, Edwards would also take the job as host of a revival of Jackpot for syndication in 1989.

Edwards was also one of four game show hosts to have emceed a game show in the United States and another in Canada concurrently (the other three were Howie Mandel, Alex Trebek, and Jim Perry). Edwards, like Perry, commuted back and forth between the United States and Canada between 1986 and 1991, hosting The Big Spin and the 1989 revival of Jackpot! in Sacramento and Glendale, respectively, and the USA Network version of Chain Reaction in Montreal, Quebec. However, Edwards was required to have a Canadian co-host on Chain Reaction, due to the fact that he had no ties to the country, unlike Trebek, Mandel and Perry (Mandel is a native Canadian, as was Trebek; Perry had blood ties to Canada and lived in Toronto, Ontario during the first several years of Definition). His commuting days ended after Chain Reaction left the air in 1991. (Chain Reaction's next incarnation would be in 2006 on Game Show Network with Dylan Lane hosting.)

Edwards was famous for his catch phrase — "Right you are!" — which he frequently exclaimed after a correct answer.

== Other television work ==
Edwards was also co-host of the Los Angeles news program Mid Morning L.A. on KHJ-TV (now KCAL-TV), replacing Bob Hilton in the early 1980s and paired with co-host Meredith MacRae. Edwards and MacRae won Emmy Awards for best host and best hostess respectively for a news magazine series. The two also emceed an unsold Bob Stewart-produced game show pilot, $50,000 a Minute, in 1985 for ABC.

In 1985, Edwards became host of The Big Spin, the game show of the California Lottery, and would remain host of that program until his retirement from television in 1995. In an interview with Blog Talk Radio, Edwards said he helmed the pilot of Fun & Fortune, the lottery game show in Missouri (before Rick Tamblyn became the permanent host). In another interview, he said he was offered the host role for Family Feud but had to turn it down because he was already committed to Shoot for the Stars.

In 1995, Edwards appeared on Sliders, in the episode "Luck of the Draw".

== Family ==
Edwards and his first wife, Suzanne, co-hosted a talk show, The His and Her of It. The program was broadcast on television stations owned and operated by ABC. In 1970, the couple also served as honorary co-chairmen of the organization California Association of Parents of Deaf and Hard of Hearing Children.

== Later years ==
In his later years, Edwards traveled extensively, hosting traveling programs on both radio and television, and writing about travel. His travel book Going All The Way humorously chronicles his around-the-world cruise adventures. He appeared as a guest on GSN Live on May 16, 2008.

During his tenure on Starcade, as a result of his extensive studying about video games to avoid what his predecessor did, he became a video game fan; he would often give his own hints to help contestants on the show when they selected a particular game to play, and one "Starcade Hotline" segment showed him beating the notoriously difficult arcade game Sinistar (he and other crew members would often play the arcade games between tapings).

== Death ==
Edwards died of complications from pneumonia at Saint John's Health Center in Santa Monica, California, on March 5, 2014, less than a month after his 83rd birthday.

Preceded by First Host	Host of Jackpot; 1974 – 1975	Succeeded by Mike Darow (1985-1988)
Preceded by Bill Cullen	Sub-host, Chain Reaction; April 7 – 18, 1980	Succeeded by Bill Cullen
Preceded by Blake Emmons	Host of Chain Reaction; 1986 – 1991	Succeeded by Dylan Lane (in the 2006 GSN version)
Preceded by Chuck Woolery	Host of The Big Spin; November 25, 1985 – January 21, 1995	Succeeded by Larry Anderson
Preceded by Mike Darow (1985-1988)	Host of Jackpot; 1989 – 1990	Succeeded by series cancelled
