= Illinois Instant Riches =

Lottery game show for the state of Illinois

- Created by: Jonathan Goodson
- Presented by: Mark Goodman with Linda Kollmeyer
- Narrated by: Bill Barber; Tony Russell
- Composer: Score Productions
- Country of origin: United States
- No. of seasons: 4
- No. of episodes: 150+

Production
- Running time: 30 minutes
- Production company: Mark Goodson Productions

Original release
- Network: Syndicated (Illinois only); WGN (nationally)
- Release: July 9, 1994 – August 15, 1998

Illinois Instant Riches (later known as Illinois' Luckiest) is a lottery game show airing in the state of Illinois, as well as nationally on Chicago-based Superstation WGN-TV. The show was hosted by Mark Goodman, with Linda Kollmeyer as his co-host and Bill Barber as announcer.

The show was produced by Mark Goodson Productions (later Jonathan Goodson Productions), and premiered on July 9, 1994. The show was renamed Illinois' Luckiest in 1998 and aired until 2000.

For contestants to appear on the show, they had to purchase an Illinois Instant Riches/Illinois' Luckiest scratch-off ticket from an Illinois Lottery retailer. Common for the lottery game shows of the 90s, if they uncovered three television set symbols on the ticket, the ticket was sent into a submission address, or redeemed physically at the nearest lottery office.

Players were randomly chosen from those tickets to be in the show's contestant pool, but only a certain number of them would be selected to play an on-stage game.

Several of the games on this show were transported to and from some other lottery game shows, most notably Flamingo Fortune (Florida), Bonus Bonanza (Massachusetts), and NY Wired (New York); the differences are mentioned in this article. Elements from these games also carried over to the quarterly-based Michigan Lottery game show Make Me Rich.

== Rules (Illinois Instant Riches) ==
Fifteen contestants were in the contestant pool. Kollmeyer would spin a wheel that was hooked to lights above each contestant's seat. When the wheel stopped, the player whose seat was lit would play a game, in addition to winning a set of lottery tickets.

During a special remote broadcast from Arlington Race Course in 1997, the selection and bonus rounds were modified. Random numbers were drawn to choose contestants, pulled from the same kind of machine used for their lottery drawings. Also, the original bonus game, Knockout, was played in place of the current (at the time) game, Pot O'Gold, and modified its format to account for the returning champion.

=== Mini-games ===
==== Force Field ====
A pendulum was suspended from the ceiling above a table of 10 identical magnets arranged in a circle. Each magnet was assigned a different amount of money: $1,000 to $5,000 (in increments of $1,000), $8,000, $10,000, $12,000, $15,000, and $20,000. The pendulum was placed on a launcher mounted on the outer edge of the table, which could be moved to any position before releasing.

The contestant was given two turns at the outset. On each turn, they released the pendulum and won the amount over which it came to rest, and that amount was changed to a "Wipe Out" space. If the pendulum stopped on "Wipe Out" during the second turn, the contestant lost all money from the first one.

After the second turn, the largest amount still in play was multiplied by five, for a potential maximum of $100,000, and the smallest one was replaced by "Wipe Out." The contestant could stop at this point and keep all money won in the first two turns, or take one more turn in an attempt to raise their winnings. The highest possible payout was $127,000.

==== Home Run (a.k.a. Touchdown, Fast Break, and Home Stretch) ====
Three figures representing sports players (orange, blue, yellow) were placed on a board, three steps away from a finish line. The contestant chose one number at a time from a second board of 12; each number hid one of the three players, who would then move one step ahead. The orange and blue players respectively awarded $1,000 and $10,000 if they crossed the finish line first. The prize for a yellow win was determined by the contestant, who chose one of four face-down cards before the game began: one each of $25,000, $50,000, $75,000, and $100,000.

The theme of the game changed to match the sports season being played at the time (baseball, football, basketball); for the 1997 episode filmed at Arlington Race Course, a horse racing theme was used.

The prize for an orange win was $1 in the first few episodes when this game was played.

==== Mismatch ====
Two containers held three balls each (one apiece of red, yellow, and green). The contestant was spotted $5,000 and drew one ball from the container on their right to establish a "base" color. They then drew three balls from the left container, one at a time; each ball was replaced after it was drawn. Every time the contestant drew a ball different from the base color, they won an additional $5,000; there was no penalty for a match.

After the third draw, the contestant could end the game and keep all winnings or attempt one last draw. A second ball in the base color would be added to the left container, and the total was tripled if the contestant did not match it or halved if they did. The maximum payoff was $60,000.

==== Vortex ====
The contestant stood at a circular table whose sides sloped down to a depression at its center and was given a cash prize at the start of the game (initially $3,000, later $4,000). Pulling a lever released seven balls (five yellow, two red) from a chute, whereupon they would roll down into the depression and form a flower-like pattern, with one ball surrounded by the other six. If the center ball was yellow, the contestant's winnings were doubled. A second round was then played, using four yellow and three red balls, and the total was tripled if a yellow ball was at the center. No money was lost if a red ball landed at the center on either of these turns.

After the second turn, the contestant could either stop the game and keep all winnings, or play one more turn using three yellow and four red balls. The total would be quadrupled for a yellow ball at the center, or lose half for a red. The maximum payoff was $72,000 (later $96,000).

==== Knockout ====
This game utilized a round table, divided into 12 sections. Four cylinders were placed on the table, and a cube was placed in the middle and turned on, bouncing and moving at random and potentially knocking over some of the cylinders. The contestant was spotted $3,000 to start the game.

During the first round, the cube was activated for 10 seconds; each cylinder still standing after that time added $1,500 to the contestant's total. The cube was activated for 15 seconds in the second round, after which the contestant received $2,500 for each upright cylinder.

The contestant could then either end the game and keep all winnings, or play a third turn using only one cylinder. The total would be quadrupled if the cylinder remained standing after the cube had been activated for 20 seconds, or lose half if it was knocked down. The maximum payoff was $76,000.

==== Wrecking Ball ====
Twelve buildings were placed around the edges of a rotating turntable, with a wrecking ball positioned to swing at them. While facing away from the turntable, the contestant pulled a lever to release the ball so that it swung back and forth. After six swings, the contestant won $1,500 for every building still standing. A second round was then played, awarding $3,000 per intact building at its end. Buildings were not replaced between rounds.

After the second round, the contestant could end the game and keep the money, or play once more. The third round was played with either three buildings or the number left standing, whichever was greater. If at least three buildings were standing after this round, the contestant's total was doubled; otherwise, the contestant lost half of the money won up to that point. The maximum payoff was $108,000.

==== Double Dollars ====
This was the only game that was played on every episode of Illinois Instant Riches from the beginning of the run up to the format/name change in 1998 (although it returned in 2000).

The contestant pulled a lever to launch one Ping-Pong ball at a time to the top of a board similar to a pachinko machine, whose bottom edge was divided into eight slots. Landing in an empty slot awarded $5,000, while landing in an occupied one penalized the contestant with a strike (indicated by an X on the screen and a buzzer sounding).

Once the contestant had two strikes, they could either end the game and keep all winnings, or continue to play. In the latter case, if the ball landed in an occupied slot, the contestant lost half of the money won up to that point and the game ended (three X's appearing on the screen and the losing horn sounding). If it landed in an empty slot, the money was doubled and the contestant was again offered the chance to stop or continue. The game ended when the contestant either earned the third strike, chose to stop, or filled all eight slots (whichever came first).

The potential maximum winnings total in this game was $640,000, achievable by putting three of the first four balls into the same slot and one ball into each of the other seven. Also the losing horn used for getting the third strike was the same losing horn used on another Mark Goodson Productions game show Classic Concentration from 1987 to 1991 when a contestant lost the bonus round and also used on the short-lived Now You See It in 1989 when the contestant lost the solo game.

=== Bonus Games ===
The show had three bonus games throughout the run, which involved the three contestants chosen to play the mini-games during the show.

==== Knockout ====
The contestants were positioned around a table divided into 12 wedges. They drew numbers to determine the wedges on which cylindrical markers were placed, one in each contestant's color. A motorized cube was placed at the center of the table and released to bounce around randomly for 30 seconds; any contestant whose marker had not been knocked down after that time won the cash prize assigned to their wedge, ranging from $7,500 to $100,000.

In 1997, the show filmed an episode at Arlington Race Course. Since the Pot O' Gold set was too large and bulky to transport to the location, a modified version of Knockout was played instead. The returning champion selected one of the 12 wedges for their marker, and the challenger's marker was placed directly across the table from it. The cube was then released, and the last contestant whose marker was left standing won the game. A victory by the champion awarded $20,000, while the challenger received the cash prize assigned to their own wedge for a win.

==== Thunderball ====
This game, similar to the children's game KerPlunk, used a large container and 15 balls that were roughly the size of basketballs. These were held in the upper portion of the container by 10 numbered, criss-crossing rods. Each contestant in turn drew one number at a time from a board, and the corresponding rod was pulled out, possibly dislodging some of the balls and causing them to fall to the bottom of the container. Contestants were eliminated after either dropping a total of five balls or dropping the last one to the bottom. The last remaining contestant chose one of the numbers he/she had drawn and received the cash amount paired with it, which could range from $10,000 to $100,000.

==== Pot O' Gold ====
The "Pot O' Gold" game debuted in 1995 and utilized a returning-champion format. The biggest winner from the current week's show stood at the beginning of an eight-step path, while the previous week's champion stood at its end. The first five steps were numbered 1 through 5, while each of the last three offered a different cash award: $10,000, $25,000, and "Big Money."

On each turn, the champion secretly set a booby trap on one of the three steps immediately ahead of the opponent, who then had to move onto one of those steps. The champion then sprang the trap; if the opponent was caught, they had to return to their previous position. The champion won $20,000 for successfully trapping the opponent twice, while the opponent took the championship by safely reaching any of the last three steps. The $10,000 and $25,000 steps awarded their value, and "Big Money" gave the new champion an opportunity to select one of five coins marked with values from $40,000 to $200,000 in increments of $40,000.

Champions were retired after a total of six wins; this happened once during the show's run, and a reigning six-time winner was allowed to compete again during the show's 1997 episode at Arlington Race Course and then retire. When there was no champion, the top money winner took that position in Pot O' Gold and the runner-up played as the opponent.

Flamingo Fortune renamed this game Treasure Island. The rules were the same, except that the "Big Money" step was replaced by a picture of a treasure chest, and it used 10 coins ranging from $50,000 to $500,000 in increments of $50,000. The champion won $25,000 for defeating a challenger.

== Rules (Illinois' Luckiest) ==
Illinois' Luckiest
- Created by: Jonathan Goodson
- Presented by: Mark Goodman with Linda Kollmeyer; Jeanne Sparrow
- Narrated by: Tony Russell
- Country of origin: United States
- No. of seasons: 2
- No. of episodes: 75+

Production
- Running time: 30 minutes

Original release
- Network: Syndicated (Illinois only); WGN (nationally)
- Release: August 22, 1998 – October 21, 2000

On August 22, 1998, the show underwent a revamp in terms of set, name, and gameplay in addition to Tony Russell replacing Bill Barber as announcer. Eighteen contestants were selected to play three games. Before each round, six contestants chose an envelope with an answer to a polling question asked to people all across Illinois (Ex.: What is the best food invented in the past 1,000 years?). The three people holding the Top 3 answers would continue to play the game.

On January 29, 2000 the show had yet another rule change. This time, there were 25 people instead of 18 (although on the episode Kollmeyer mentioned there were still 18 contestants), and they divided amongst themselves into five teams of 5 each. Each team stood in one of the pinball slots from 1 to 5, and whoever's slot was picked would play the next game. Lots were drawn before each game to determine the captain for each game, and it was possible for the same team to play all three mini-games. Teams were not allowed to pick the same step.

=== Mini-games ===
==== Knockout ====
Played during the first format, this game underwent a rule change to accommodate the new format. Contestants bid on how long the bouncing cube could bounce around a circular table without knocking down one of two cylinders on the table. If the cube didn't knock a cylinder down, the high bidder(s) won money: $2,000 in Round 1, $3,000 in Round 2, and $5,000 in Round 3.

If a cylinder was knocked down, everyone but the bidder won the money. A $10,000 bonus was awarded to the player with the most money after Round 3, and was split if a tie occurred. The maximum payoff was $20,000.

==== Freefall ====
Played during the first format, this was revamped version of "Double Dollars". To start, Goodman would launch a ball up a machine similar to the Double Dollars game board from IIR and each of the names of the three contestants were in a bag (or the numbers 1, 2, and 3 were printed on balls and placed into a fish tank with water). One player was chosen by Kollmeyer at random. That person would launch a ball up the machine. If the ball landed in one of the seven unoccupied slots, that person won $2,000.

Kollmeyer would then go back in the bag and pull out one of the three names. This time, if the ball landed in one of the six unoccupied slots, the player won $4,000. Every successive time a ball landed in an open slot was worth $2,000 more than the previous. If a ball landed in an occupied slot, that contestant was eliminated for the rest of the game (indicated by an X on the screen) and he or she lost half the money won (if the player won nothing, they won $500). Also, one could freeze at any time before they chose to launch the ping pong ball and sit out for the rest of the game. The player with the most money after everyone was eliminated or had frozen won a $10,000 bonus, which again was split if a tie occurred. The maximum payoff was $66,000.

The strike sound effect and graphic from "Double Dollars" carried over to "Freefall."

==== Force Field ====
Played during the first format, everyone began with $3,000 and wagered their money hoping a pendulum would land on a WIN space. The game was played on a round board with a pendulum in the middle and 10 magnets arranged in a circle on the table. For Round 1, six areas were marked WIN and four were marked LOSE, and contestants could wager up to half their money. If a WIN space was hit, the contestants won the amount of money wagered (and lost the amount if a LOSE space was hit).

For Round 2, four areas were marked WIN (one was regular, one was WIN × 2 (double the wager), one was WIN × 3 (triple the wager), and one was WIN × 4 (quadruple the wager)) and there were six LOSE spaces. The contestants could wager as much as they wanted in this final round. Again, a $10,000 bonus was awarded to the player with the most money, and was split in case of a tie. The maximum payoff was $32,500.

Kollmeyer took charge of this game entirely by herself, similar to what Goodman would ultimately do with the return of "Double Dollars."

==== Splashdown ====
Introduced on the 25th Anniversary Special and officially added on January 29, 2000, this game had the players face a board of 18 numbered rods, split into three rows (numbered 1 to 4 on top, 5 to 10 in the middle, and 11 to 18 on the bottom), each holding up a colored ball. Rods 1 through 4 held up two reds and a green, the rest held yellow balls. The captain of the team would draws a number, and that rod was removed from the playfield.

If a yellow ball splashed down into the water, the team won $5,000. If no balls splashed down, the team won $500.

The only way the game ended (besides the captain saying "I'll stop") was if a red or green ball splashed down. If a red ball splashed down, either by itself or with other colored balls (including the green one), the team would lose half their winnings. If the green ball splashed down without either red ball, the team's total was bumped to $50,000 on the Special, or $75,000 on the series proper (The maximum payment was $50,000 or $75,000).

This game was first introduced after the cancellation of the Florida lottery game show Flamingo Fortune, which first carried it. The rules were the same, except the money payout was given to one individual person, and was $1,000 for no ball splashing down, $10,000 for a yellow ball splashing down, and $100,000 for the green ball splashing down with no red ball. A red ball splashing down, even with the green one, still cost players half their money.

Splashdown was renamed Niagara for NY Wired after Niagara Falls. The value was $1,000 (later $500) for no ball splashing down, $6,000 (later $2,500) for a yellow ball splashing down, and the progressive jackpot for the green ball. Red still took away half the player's money.

==== Vortex IL2 ====
Introduced on January 29, 2000. Same rules as IIR, except the money was split by the team. The team captain was assigned to pull the lever that released the balls.

==== The Money Machine IL2 ====
Introduced on the 25th Anniversary Special. The team captain, placed in a money machine with money blown all over the place by jets (similar to the 2002 version of Beat the Clock) had 45 seconds to grab as much lottery money as possible. The lottery money had one $1,000 bill within a ton of $50 and $100 bills. The captain could grab money flying through the air and stuff it into his/her apron, but could not pick up money off the floor. After 45 seconds, the jets were turned off, and the auditors separated the money grabbed from the money left on the floor into two boxes appropriately labeled "Money Grabbed" and "Money Left on the Floor." The team then had to guess where the $1,000 bill was. If correct, their winnings were bumped up to $50,000. If not, they only won the money grabbed. The money was split by the team members.

When the game debuted on Illinois' Luckiest the rules were different. After the captain was done in the machine, the team had to make a decision. They could keep the money grabbed or gamble it for $75,000 if they believed the captain grabbed the $1,000 bill. If they gambled and the bill was grabbed, they won the top prize. However, if they gambled and the bill wasn't grabbed, the winnings were reduced to $10,000.

==== Double Dollars IL2 ====
Introduced on January 29, 2000. Same rules as IIR, except the money was split by the team. The team captain, instead of pulling a lever, had to press a button on a signaling device modeled after the devices used on shows such as Jeopardy!.

The button was also used for the "Double Dollars" spin-off game, "Freefall," described above.

=== Bonus Games ===
==== $100,000 Pinball IL1 ====
All 18 players competed in this game. Each contestant would step behind a slot that corresponded with a hole that a computerized pinball could land in. In Round 1, there are three slots. The contestants who chose the correct slot each won $1,000 and advanced to next round. The rest were eliminated. Round 2 had four slots; surviving this round awarded another $1,000 and a chance at the $100,000 in Round 3. Round 3 had five slots. Everyone who survived all three rounds divided $100,000 or the entire amount if only one contestant survived all three rounds.

The pinball machine moved to the start of the game midway through the run, used to determine the contestants to play a mini-game.

==== Pot O' Gold IL2 ====
In the Luckiest run, Pot O' Gold was slightly reformatted, since the show no longer had returning champions. The top winner of the show was the defender, and the other players all moved up the road as a team sharing the cash prizes ($10,000, $25,000, or "Big Money"), depending on how money people avoided the booby-traps. Also, there were only four steps before the $10,000 prize, and the lowest "Big Money" coin was lowered to $30,000. The defender would trap two spaces before the other players moved a maximum of three spaces. Each space had a "railroad gate." If the gate went down, players who took the space were eliminated.

If the defender won, he/she picked from envelopes labeled A, B, or C, winning one of the cash prizes. If the envelope read "BIG MONEY" he/she got to pick from the gold coins. If the challengers won (depending on the number left), they split the cash prizes, and if they won the "BIG MONEY," they conferred with each other before choosing a gold coin.

On the 25th Anniversary Special, this version of the game was played with a guaranteed giveaway of $200,000, so that if the defender won, he/she kept it all to himself/herself, but if the challengers won (depending on how many were left), they got to split it.
