= Lennie Bennett =

English comedian and game show host (1938–2009)

- Publicity shot of Bennett promoting the early-1980s TV quiz "Punchlines"
- Born: Michael Berry; 26 September 1938; Blackpool, Lancashire, England
- Died: 8 April 2009 (aged 70); Lancaster, Lancashire, England
- Resting place: Church of St John the Evangelist, Poulton Le Fylde, Lancashire, England
- Occupation: Television comedian
- Years active: 1971–1993
- Spouses: Margaret Backhouse (divorced); Teresa Jackson (divorced)

Michael Berry (26 September 1938 – 8 April 2009), known professionally as Lennie Bennett, was an English comedian and game-show host.

After attending the Palatine Secondary School in Blackpool, Bennett became a journalist for the West Lancashire Evening Gazette before becoming a professional hypnotist and appearing on the BBC light entertainment programme The Good Old Days in 1969. He starred with Jerry Stevens in the Lennie and Jerry Show (originally titled Lennie and Jerry), which ran from 1978 to 1980. Bennett was also the host of Punchlines and Lucky Ladders in the 1980s.

He also performed in twelve Royal Variety Shows, and had a brief stint as a chat show host on London Weekend Television in 1982, before working as a speaker on the after-dinner circuit.

Bennett suffered a serious heart attack in 1994, which necessitated a bypass operation. He died at the age of 70 in the Royal Lancaster Infirmary on 8 April 2009, following a fall at his home from which he failed to regain consciousness. His funeral took place at the Carleton Crematorium.

== TV appearances ==
- Jokers Wild – panel game, regular guest, ITV, 1972–73
- Celebrity Squares – panel game, regular guest, ITV, 1970s
- International Cabaret – variety show, host, BBC2, 1978
- The Lennie and Jerry Show (originally titled Lennie and Jerry) – sketch show, BBC1, 1978–80
- Blankety Blank – game show, regular panellist, BBC1, 1979–80
- Punchlines – game show, host, ITV, 1981–84
- TSW Opening Night – host, Television South West, 1 January 1982
- The Kenny Everett Video Show, guest, ITV, 1983
- Names and Games – game show specials, host, ITV, 1984–85

In 1987, Bennett was a guest on David Frosts show Through the Keyhole.

- Lucky Ladders – game show, host, ITV, 1988–93
- You Bet! – game show, regular panellist, ITV, 1990
- Fantasy Football League – guest, BBC, 1995
- After They Were Famous – documentary, subject, ITV, 2004
