= California State Lottery =

U.S. state lottery system

- State Lottery logo (as of 2008)
- Formation: November 6, 1984
- Type: State lottery
- Headquarters: Sacramento, California, U.S.
- Website: www.calottery.com

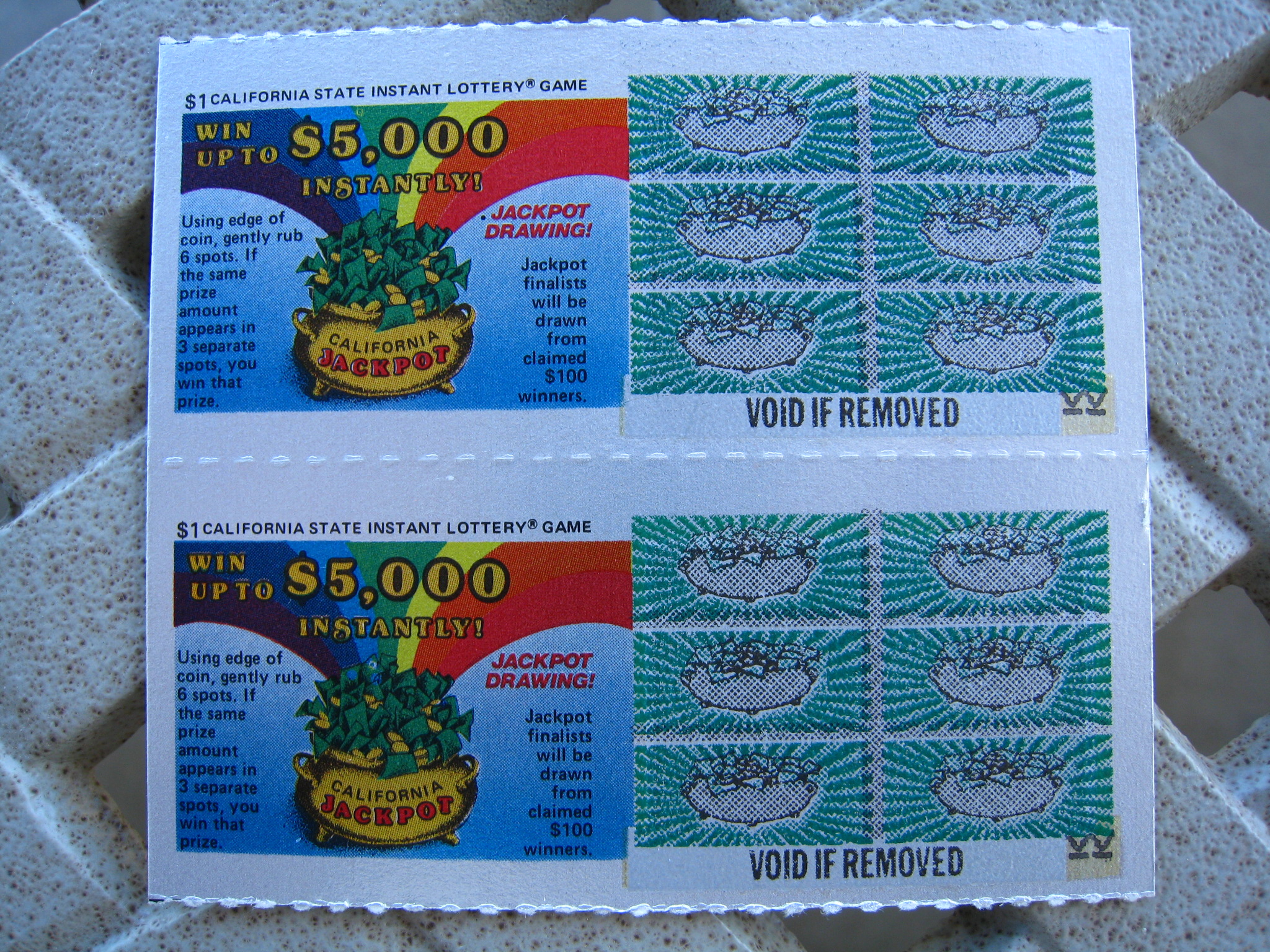
Pair of the California Lottery's original tickets, purchased October 3, 1985, that are unscratched

The California State Lottery began in October 1985 after voters authorized it in Proposition 37, the California State Lottery Act of 1984. It offers a range of games including number draws, scratchcards and a mock horse race. The earnings provide supplementary funding for public education.

== Lottery Act ==
The Lottery Act was intended to provide more money to schools without imposing extra taxes. Accordingly, the Lottery was required to provide at least 34% of its revenues to public education, supplementing (not replacing) other funds provided by California. Another 50% of its revenues must be paid to the public in the form of prizes, making a mandated minimum of 84% of all funds that must be given back to the public in the form of prizes or funds for public education. The remainder, a maximum of 16%, was to be spent on administration, such as salaries and running the games.

On April 8, 2010, Governor Arnold Schwarzenegger signed into law Assembly Bill 142 (Hayashi, D-Hayward). Amending the Lottery Act, this bill reallocates Lottery revenues "so as to maximize the amount of funding allocated to public education." As an urgency statute, this bill took effect immediately. The new allocation increased to at least 87% the portion of Lottery revenue returned to the public, and correspondingly decreased to a maximum of 13% the amount spent on administration. It then specified that "not less than 50% of the total annual Lottery revenues, in an amount to be determined by the commission, be returned to the public in the form of prizes." This leaves "the commission to establish the percentage to be allocated to the benefit of public education at a level that maximizes the total net revenues allocated to the benefit of public education." It also imposed requirements "to ensure continued growth in Lottery net revenues allocated to public education", with annual procedures that would, "in any one of the first 5 full fiscal years after the enactment of this measure, ... provide for the repeal of the changes made by this measure on the following January 1, and the prior law to be restored", if those requirements were not then met. This bill follows the practice of "other large state lottery systems, including Texas, North Carolina, and Florida, which have shown an increase in revenue through similar changes."

=== Commission ===
The Lottery Act mandates a five-member commission, appointed by the governor, to "oversee the Lottery and the Director" and make quarterly reports "to the Governor, the Attorney General, the Controller, the Treasurer, and the Legislature." Annually the commission selects a chairperson. Regular meetings of the commission are held at least quarterly and are open to the public. On January 29, 1985, Gov. George Deukmejian appointed the first Lottery commissioners: William Johnston, Laverta Montgomery, John Price, Howard Varner, and Kennard Webster. Deukmejian appointed the first director, Mark Michalko, formerly Ohio Lottery legal counsel, in May 1985. On 12 March 2012, Governor Jerry Brown appointed Gregory J. Ahern to the commission, who was also elected as Sheriff of Alameda County in 2006.

== History ==
The Lottery Act of 1984 was presented to voters in November of that year as a ballot proposition, Proposition 37, and passed with 58% of the vote. On January 29, 1985, Gov. George Deukmejian appointed the first Lottery commissioners: William Johnston, Laverta Montgomery, John Price, Howard Varner, and Kennard Webster. The Act mandated an extremely tight timeline for establishing the Lottery and bringing it to operational status. To comply, the state government immediately built the Lottery's original headquarters in only three months in the Richards neighborhood of Sacramento (just north of downtown). Governor Deukmejian appointed the Lottery's first director, Mark Michalko, formerly Ohio Lottery legal counsel, in May 1985. The first lottery games were Scratchers; sales began on October 3, 1985. A weekly Lotto game began a year later on October 14, 1986. Games hosted by the California Lottery include MEGA Millions, Super Lotto Plus, Fantasy 5, Daily 4, Daily 3, Daily Derby, and Scratchers.

In 1996, as a result of a lawsuit by a pachinko parlor and an association of owners and trainers of race horses, the Supreme Court of California unanimously struck down the lottery's implementation of keno, ruling that it was a house-banked game, not a lottery game, which at that time was illegal anywhere in California. In her opinion for the court, Associate Justice Kathryn Werdegar explained that the California Penal Code and case law interpreting the Penal Code have traditionally distinguished between a "lottery" and a "banked game" or "banking game", and it was the intent of the state electorate in enacting the Lottery Act to allow only a "lottery". In a true "lottery", the players play against each other; in a "banked game", they play each other and against the house. The critical distinction between the two is that a bank in a "banked game" can be broken based purely upon whether each of the individual bets is won or lost; the house unconditionally promises to pay prizes on all winning bets with no maximum ceiling. The high court explained that while this definition of a lottery does not prohibit fixed-prize lotteries, such lotteries are valid only if the total prize amount and the maximum number of fixed prizes to be won are fixed before the draw. Subsequently, California Attorney General Dan Lungren also ruled that Daily 3, which at the time had fixed payouts, also was illegal because it created an interest on the part of the state that fewer people should win, contrary to a lottery where the operator has no stake in the outcome of the draw. In response to these rulings, the Lottery modified Keno and created Hot Spot, which has a pari-mutuel payout format, and modified Daily 3 to a pari-mutuel format where payouts vary depending on the number of individuals who picked the winning numbers.

California joined Mega Millions on June 22, 2005; it became the 12th jurisdiction to offer the game, and the last to join before the 2010 cross-sell expansion with Multi-State Lottery Association (MUSL). A Mega Millions drawing was held in Hollywood to commemorate the event.

In September 2011, the California Lottery moved into a new $58 million headquarters at 700 North 10th Street right next to the old one, which was promptly demolished. Because the original headquarters was built in a frantic 90-day rush to comply with the Lottery Act, it suffered from numerous construction defects in the roof, foundation, and elevator, as well as a mold problem.

California, while initially never desiring to offer Mega Millions's rival Powerball, was briefly a member of the MUSL because an "international" lottery game that would have included a number of US lotteries was planned; however, the game never came to fruition. However, in February 2012 the California Lottery initiated an impact analysis of the Powerball game, in preparation for a recommendation in July 2012. Subsequently, the Fiscal Year 2012–2013 Business Plan included funding for a launch of Powerball within the fiscal year, with Powerball launching in California on April 8, 2013. As a result of the California Supreme Court's decision, California is the only state with variable payouts for both games.

== Current draw games ==
=== In-house draw games ===
==== Daily 3 ====
Playing Daily 3 involves picking three digits 0 through 9 and a playstyle. Bettors can choose Quick Pick to have the numbers picked randomly by computer. The playstyle choices are straight (this is the default if the player doesn't choose one) box, or straight/box. The game costs $1 per play, per draw, and the Advance Play option allows up to 14 consecutive draws. There are two draws every day, televised at 1:29pm and 6:59pm.

==== Daily 4 ====
A "pick 4" type game premiered on May 19, 2008. Each play costs $1 and drawings are held once per day. Playstyles, like "Daily 3".

==== Daily Derby ====
Daily Derby is a mock horse racing game. Players choose three horses out of 12, one each to finish first (win), second (place) and third (show); players also choose a race time from 1:40:00 to 1:49:99, by marking the last three digits of the time on the playslip. Alternately, players can select Quick Pick to have the computer choose the horses, the race time, or both. Daily Derby also offers Advance Play for up to 14 consecutive draws. The game costs $2 per play, per draw; held daily at 6:35pm and televised at 6:59pm.

==== Fantasy 5 ====
Fantasy 5 players choose five numbers from 1 through 39. A ticket includes up to five sets of numbers; they can be played up to 12 drawings. Games cost $1 per play. Fantasy 5 is drawn evenings at 6:35pm and televised at 6:59pm. The starting jackpot ranges between $60,000 and $80,000. Players can win by matching 2, 3, 4, or all 5 numbers in any order with the numbers selected on their fantasy 5 tickets.

A player who bought a $5 Fantasy 5 ticket used to get a coupon to mail in for a "second-chance" drawing to be on the Make Me a Millionaire show, or to play the Dream Machine on the first TV show, The Big Spin. That drawing was cancelled in July 2010 and now players receive a "second-chance" coupon with a twenty digit code. Players can enter those codes at www.calottery.com/fan5 to be entered into a weekly drawing for a cash prize ranging from $1,000 to $10,000.

==== SuperLotto Plus ====
SuperLotto Plus is a lotto game played in the style of Mega Millions and Powerball. SuperLotto Plus is drawn every Wednesday and Saturday. The game began in 1986 as Lotto 6/49 (which was played similarly to the Canadian version of the game), then changed to SuperLotto somewhere in the 90s (with the matrix of 6/51). In 2000, the name was changed to SuperLotto Plus. Its starting jackpot is $7 million (annuitized); a cash option is available for jackpot winners. SuperLotto Plus players choose five numbers from 1 through 47, and one Mega Ball number from 1 through 27.

While the cash option usually is chosen, the SuperLotto Plus annuity is graduated. The advertised annuity jackpot represents a 30-payment graduated annuity stream, with the graduated payments beginning at 1.51% of the jackpot amount and rise exponentially such that the final payout is 6.20% (more than quadruple that of the first payment) of the advertised jackpot amount. Prior to 2013, the first payment was 2.5% of the annuity value (or share) of the jackpot, with the second installment 2.7%. The remaining 24 payments increased by 0.1 percentage point yearly, so that the final (26th) installment represented 5.1% of the annuity.

==== Hot Spot ====
Hot Spot is a quick-draw keno style game. The game was updated on August 1, 2011, to allow players to choose to play any number of "spots" from 1 through 10 from a pool of numbers from 01 through 80. A new higher top prize of $100,000 was also offered for 10 spot play. Previously, players could only choose to play 2, 3, 4, 5 or 8 spots. Wagering can be either $1, $2, $3, $4, $5, $10, or $20, for a maximum of 100 consecutive draws. In addition, players can choose a Bulls-Eye wager for each draw, hoping to hit the 1 number out of the 20 numbers drawn that is selected as the bulls-eye number. Drawings occur every day and every four minutes from 6:00 am until 2:00 am. Lottery retailers have monitors that display Hot Spot drawings and recent results from other Lottery games. Fixed prizes are awarded. To meet the pari-mutuel requirements, a continuous "wagered prize fund" is created from 63% of gross sales, which ensures that the fixed payouts are met under normal circumstances, and calls for reductions should an unusually large number of individuals win a particular prize. If the wagered prize fund exceeds $2.9 million, prize augmentation and promotions are created to distribute the excess funds.

=== Multi-jurisdictional games ===
The CSL's involvement in multi-state games includes part-time employees stationed in Atlanta (for Mega Millions) and Tallahassee, Florida (for Powerball), or wherever each game may be drawn, in order to fulfill the Lottery Act's requirement that a CSL employee supervises and audits the drawings for each game offered.

==== Mega Millions ====
In 2004, Gov. Arnold Schwarzenegger, as part of his redesign of California government, suggested that California join a multi-jurisdictional lottery. In June 2005, the Lottery Commission voted to join Mega Millions.

California is unique among the 45 Mega Millions participants in that all nine prize levels for Mega Millions within its borders are always parimutuel, rather than each non-jackpot prize having a set value. This leads to different prize amounts for equivalent winners sold in California when compared to those sold in the other 44 jurisdictions. For example, the "advertised" second prize in Mega Millions is $1,000,000; but in California the record amount was set for a $3.9 million sold in Hacienda Heights in 2023 as part of the roll for a $1.1 billion jackpot. The second prize pool within California frequently rolls; it is, in effect, a "secondary jackpot". Unlike the other Mega Millions members, California currently does not offer the Megaplier, which is drawn in Texas by a random number generator.

==== Powerball ====
In February 2012, as a response to declining sales and low per-capita revenue from the lottery, California Lottery management initiated a review of whether Powerball would be appropriate for the state. In September 2012, the Lottery Commission approved management's request to launch Powerball in April 2013, citing a net increase in revenue of $90 to $120 million as a result of Powerball, desiring to avoid the launch of a $20 scratcher in fall 2013.

In November 2012, California promulgated the regulations for Powerball in the state. Similar to Mega Millions, all non jackpot draws in the state are within an intrastate pool, with California sending its jackpot share (30% of draw sales) to MUSL for addition to the multi-state jackpot pool. This leads to different prize amounts for equivalent winners sold in California when compared to those sold in the other 44 jurisdictions. Each pool for a particular prize category will rollover, thus the "pick 5" prize will create a secondary jackpot similar to the "pick 5" payout in California's implementation of Mega Millions. The record amount was set in 2023 for $3,987,429, as part of a $600 million jackpot roll. Also, as a result of the California Supreme Court ruling which mandates pari-mutuel payouts, California will not participate in the PowerPlay multiplier option. California launched Powerball on April 8, 2013, with the first drawing on April 10, 2013.

== Former games ==
=== Draw games ===
Little Lotto: A pick 6-out-of-39 game with a fixed top prize of $500,000. A year later, it became Fantasy 5.

Decco: Played in a similar fashion as most US "pick-4" drawing games, except players had to match one playing card(2 through Ace) in each of the four suits.

Topper: Each SuperLotto Plus ticket automatically was printed with the names of three of California's 100 then-most-populous-cities(e.g. Los Angeles, San Diego, Sacramento). If the player wagered an additional $1, they were eligible to win up to $25,000 in the Topper drawing, which was drawn by random number generator.

=== Raffle ===
The California Lottery offered two raffles; March 17, 2007 and one on January 1, 2008. The raffles offered the best chance to win a $1 million prize, as well as various smaller prizes, and were designed to respond to lottery players' complaints that many million dollar prizes be offered instead of a few larger prizes. However, the raffles did not sell out, and were not repeated.

=== TV game shows ===
The California Lottery has had two TV game shows.

==== The Big Spin ====
The Big Spin, the California Lottery's first game show, broadcast its final episode on January 10, 2009, ending its run as the longest-running lottery game show in the US. The Lottery had several methods for choosing contestants, including prizes in Scratchers games and "second-chance" drawings from other games. The top prize was fixed at $3 million; the minimum guaranteed prize was $1,750. While Big Spin Scratchers remained in circulation in 2009, winners who would previously have spun the wheel on The Big Spin had the option to spin the wheel—untelevised—as an alternative to going to the Make Me a Millionaire show, which succeeded The Big Spin. Following the show's ending in 2009, the California Lottery commission deemed the wheel to be too historic to salvage, and decided to preserve The Big Spin wheel as part of a permanent exhibit at their headquarters in Sacramento. Guests are invited to spin the wheel for fun without cash prizes.

==== Make Me a Millionaire ====
Make Me a Millionaire, the California Lottery's second TV game show, debuted on January 17, 2009, for an initial four-year run with host Mark L. Walberg and co-presenter Liz Hernandez. On May 4, 2010, the California Lottery announced the show's cancellation due to poor ratings, with the last program telecast on July 3, 2010. The show will not be replaced; money that was allocated for its production will be used for prizes for the Lottery's Scratchers games.

Players qualified for the Make Me a Millionaire show by winning in the "Make Me a Millionaire" Scratchers game, or by a Fantasy 5 second-chance drawing; when the show began, winners from "Big Spin" Scratchers also qualified. After the TV show was canceled, winners of the "Make Me a Millionaire" Scratchers games, which were sold until June 25, 2010, had until December 22, 2010, to claim their opportunities to play and win prizes off the air. Similarly, Fantasy 5 second-chance draw coupons, which were discontinued on July 4, 2010, could be submitted by December 31, 2010. Five unaired episodes of Make Me A Millionaire were produced and made available for viewing on the Lottery's YouTube channel.

During the game play, each of the 12 contestants won at least $2,000; seven of the contestants were selected randomly to play four different games of chance with a top prize of at least $1 million. The first game, Lucky Penny, gave three players a minimum prize of $2,000 and the possibility of winning a car. The second game is Safe Cracker, in which two players competed for prizes ranging from $2,000 to $92,000. Next is California Cool, with one player and prizes ranging from $5,000 to $200,000. The last game is Millionaire, also for one player; it guaranteed $10,000 with a jackpot that began at $1 million, increasing by $200,000 each week until won.

== Scratchers ==
California sells scratch cards under the branding "Scratchers". The prizes are smaller than other lottery games, but there are better odds (averaging 1:5). There are dozens of Scratchers games on sale at any time, and the selection of games changes frequently. Winners must be claimed within 180 days of the announced end-of-game date. Scratchers range in price from $1 to $30. A $20 scratcher, "$5 Million Jackpot", was introduced September 25, 2013. To commemorate the Lottery's 30th anniversary, on August 24, 2015, a $30 Scratcher "California Lottery 30th Anniversary" was launched.

== Claiming prizes ==
For each prize of less than $600, players may collect from either a Lottery retailer or the Lottery itself. Prizes of $600 or more must be collected from the Lottery, via claim form.

=== Claim period ===
Almost all prizes must be claimed within 180 days of the draw or the announced end of the game. If the 180th day is a weekend or holiday, the final claim date is extended to the next business day. Any unclaimed prize money is transferred to the education fund in addition to the minimum 34% that the Lottery is already obligated to transfer from income.

Because many of the 44 Mega Millions participants have a one-year claim period, the California legislature changed the language in the Lottery Act. On April 23, 2008, Gov. Arnold Schwarzenegger signed Assembly Member Van Tran's Assembly Bill 1251, modifying California Government Code section 8880.321 to allow for a one-year claim period for a Mega Millions jackpot prize. This is the only prize in California that has a one-year claim period. All other prizes have the 180-day claim period. This legislation affected Mega Millions drawings after July 5, 2008.

=== Payment options ===
All prizes for Fantasy 5, Daily Derby, Daily 3, Daily 4, and non-jackpot SuperLotto Plus, Mega Millions, and Powerball prizes, are paid out in one payment, less 24% or 33% (depending upon the winner's tax documentation) Federal withholding if the prize is over $5,000. Merchandise prizes over $5,000 are subject to 33% Federal withholding. Scratchers tickets are generally one-payment prizes; however, some games have annuity options for payments each year, or per week. California does not tax California Lottery winnings, however it taxes lottery winnings from other jurisdictions. For SuperLotto Plus and Mega Millions jackpots, the player may choose a single cash payout for a floating percentage of the jackpot, or an annuity. The SuperLotto Plus, Mega Millions, and Powerball payment schedule are on a graduated basis over 30 annual payments. Until 2005, when California joined Mega Millions, the payment choice on SuperLotto Plus had to be made when the ticket was bought. Since then, there is a 60-day window after winning, in which the choice of cash or annuity is to be made.

== Unclaimed prizes ==
Unclaimed prizes remaining after the claim period expires always go to supporting California's public schools. As of the end of FY 2013–14, a total of $793.5 million in unclaimed prizes have been awarded to education.

== TV Stations ==
As of 2022, California Lottery Drawings are Televised Daily at 1:29pm & 6:59pm, with SuperLotto Plus Drawings Televised between 7:57pm–8:00pm on Wednesdays & Saturdays, Mega Millions Drawings Televised on Tuesdays & Fridays and Powerball Drawings Televised on Mondays, Wednesdays & Saturdays between 8:00pm–8:25pm Pacific Time. California Lottery Drawings aired at each local station.

Market	Station
Bakersfield	KBAK-TV
El Centro, CA/Yuma, AZ	KYMA-DT
Eureka	KIEM-TV
Fresno	KFSN
Los Angeles	KCAL-TV
Monterey/Salinas	KION-TV
Palm Springs	KMIR-TV
Redding/Chico	KRVU-LD
Sacramento	KTXL
San Diego/Tijuana	KSWB-TV
San Francisco	KRON-TV
Santa Barbara/San Luis Obispo/Santa Maria	KSBY

== Controversies ==
On March 15, 2022, former lottery Investigator Reid Galbreath released a book titled "What Are The Odds: Blowing The Whistle on California's Lottery." Galbreath exposed several instances of the lottery misappropriating public funds meant for education and ignoring/violating established regulations against such conduct. Galbreath's book also cited an investigation by the California State Auditor which exposed millions of additional public money misspent by the California Lottery. To date none of the owed money has been repaid to education.

== See also ==
- Gambling in California
