= Jack Reitzen =

American actor (1924–1998)

- Reitzen in an episode of Lock-Up, 1961
- Born: May 27, 1924; Chicago, Illinois, U.S.
- Died: June 13, 1998 (aged 74); Santa Barbara, California, U.S.
- Occupations: Film, stage and television actor
- Years active: 1940–1965

Jack Reitzen (May 27, 1924 – June 13, 1998) was an American film, stage and television actor. He was best known for playing Chopstick Joe in the American adventure television series Terry and the Pirates.

== Life and career ==
Reitzen was born in Chicago, Illinois. He began his stage career in the 1940s, and in 1945, he played a philanthropist in the stage play The Drunkard at the Theater Mart in California. He then began his screen career in 1947, appearing in the film Slave Girl. In 1948, he starred as Norton Benedict in the film Appointment with Murder, starring along with John Calvert, Catherine Craig and Lyle Talbot.

Later in his career, in 1953, Reitzen starred as Chopstick Joe in the syndicated adventure television series Terry and the Pirates, starring along with John Baer, William Tracy, Sandra Spence and Gloria Saunders. He guest-starred in television programs including Gunsmoke, Tombstone Territory, Bat Masterson, The Court of Last Resort, The Sheriff of Cochise, Tales of Wells Fargo, The Untouchables and Cimarron City, and played the recurring role of Flores in the syndicated crime drama television series Not for Hire. He also appeared in films such as Captain Kidd and the Slave Girl, Female on the Beach, Untamed Mistress, Sword of Venus, Mask of the Dragon, Too Much, Too Soon, The Argyle Secrets and One Too Many.

Reitzen retired from acting in 1965, last appearing in the NBC spy television series I Spy.

== Death ==
Reitzen died of natural causes on June 13, 1998, in Santa Barbara, California, at the age of 74.
