= Merv Griffin Enterprises =

Former U.S. television production company

- Final print logo used from 1984 to 1994
- Formerly: Milbarn Enterprises, Inc. (1962–1963); Milbarn Productions (1963–1964); Merv Griffin Productions (1964–1984)
- Type: Subsidiary
- Industry: Television production
- Founded: July 7, 1962; 64 years ago
- Founder: Merv Griffin
- Defunct: June 4, 1994; 32 years ago
- Fate: Folded into Columbia TriStar Television
- Successors: Columbia TriStar Television; Merv Griffin Entertainment
- Headquarters: 10202 West Washington Boulevard, Culver City, California, United States
- Parent: The Coca-Cola Company (1986–1987); Sony Pictures Entertainment (1987–1994)
- Subsidiaries: Trans-American Video (1981–1986); Califon Productions; Jeopardy Productions; Anthony Productions; January Enterprises

Merv Griffin Enterprises was an American television production company founded by Merv Griffin, in operation from July 7, 1962, to June 4, 1994, when it was folded into Columbia TriStar Television.

== History ==
The company was first established as Milbarn Enterprises on July 7, 1962, after Merv Griffin left the game show, Play Your Hunch, where he signed a deal with NBC to create its first outing was the talk show The Merv Griffin Show for NBC, and incorporated as Milbarn Productions on March 7, 1963, and later as Merv Griffin Productions on March 5, 1964. Griffin's first game show under the Milbarn name was Word for Word. Griffin's second game show was Jeopardy! as Griffin's first production under the MGP name on March 30, 1964.

In 1965, the company decided to expand beyond the successful and breakout game show Jeopardy!, when Griffin decided to produce a second game show outing Let's Play Post Office, for NBC, but it was proven unsuccessful. In May 1965, his talk show The Merv Griffin Show returned to television. In late 1966, Griffin decided to expand beyond game and talk shows, for other genres, such as soap operas, primetime specials, and nighttime sectors.

Griffin also created the game show Shopper's Bazaar, which changed its name to Wheel of Fortune on January 6, 1975, after Jeopardy! was canceled on January 3, 1975. Griffin revived Jeopardy! as The All-New Jeopardy! on October 2, 1978, though it was proven to be unsuccessful. Merv Griffin Productions also owned the post-production studio Trans-American Video (TAV) that was founded on June 29, 1981.

In 1982, the company joined forces with King World (now CBS Media Ventures) to syndicate a nightly version of Wheel of Fortune. The company also had the rights to syndicate The Merv Griffin Show. KW also distributed the first two pilots of Jeopardy! in 1983 and January 9, 1984. In 1984, Griffin expanded his company as Merv Griffin Enterprises and during the same year, Jeopardy! also returned to television on September 10.

On May 5, 1986, Griffin sold the company to The Coca-Cola Company (then-owner of Columbia Pictures Industries) for $250 million during his semi-retirement. TAV, however, was not included in the deal. The company later became part of Columbia Pictures Entertainment on December 21, 1987, and was sold to Sony Corporation along with CPE's other companies on November 8, 1989.

Merv Griffin Enterprises was folded into Columbia TriStar Television (now Sony Pictures Television) on June 4, 1994. Jeopardy! and Wheel of Fortune were taken over by CTT starting in September of that year, while Griffin remained executive producer for both game shows until 2000. Griffin later founded Merv Griffin Entertainment on May 13, 1996.

The terms of Griffin's agreement with King World would eventually come into play in 2025, when Sony Pictures Television sought to invalidate a clause Griffin inserted into the agreement giving King World perpetual distribution rights to Wheel of Fortune and Jeopardy! King World had been dissolved in 2006, seven years after being bought by CBS, whose subsequent syndication arms (by then, CBS Media Ventures) continued to operate under that perpetual agreement. Sony won a lawsuit in April of that year to invalidate the clause and began distributing the shows themselves. CBS then confirmed they would submit an appeal immediately; on May 29, the California Courts of Appeal ruled that CBS would remain distributor of the two shows while the trial is in progress. On November 7, 2025, Sony and CBS announced that they had reached a settlement; Sony will assume the international distribution rights to Wheel and Jeopardy! beginning January 1, 2026, marketing and affiliate relations duties beginning in the 2026–27 season, and fully assume the domestic distribution rights after the 2027–28 season. CBS Media Ventures will, in turn, become the exclusive seller of advertising during the programs through the 2029–30 season.

== Employees ==
One of the most prolific employees was Don Pardo. The others were Charlie O'Donnell, Jack Clark, John Harlan, M. G. Kelly, and Johnny Gilbert, who were also announcers on Griffin shows. Most of the above announcers also worked for Bob Stewart Productions. Future executive producer of Jeopardy!, Michael Davies, worked as a development associate at the company during the early 1990s. Another employee was director Dick Carson, who also served as director for The Tonight Show for his brother Johnny Carson.

== Television programs ==
- The Merv Griffin Show (1962–1963; 1965–1986)
- Word for Word (1963–1964)
- Jeopardy! (1964–1975, 1983 pilot, 1984 pilot, 1984–present; production responsibilities assumed in 1994 by Columbia TriStar Television (later Columbia TriStar Domestic Television from 2001 to 2002), now Sony Pictures Television (previously Sony Pictures Television Studios from 2020 to 2023 and currently Sony Pictures since 2026); distributed in syndication since September 10, 1984 by King World, now CBS Media Ventures)
- Let's Play Post Office (1965–1966)
- Reach for the Stars (1967)
- One in a Million (1967)
- Memory Game (1971)
- Wheel of Fortune (1975–1991, daytime version; 1983–present, nighttime version; production responsibilities assumed in 1994 by Columbia TriStar Television (later Columbia TriStar Domestic Television from 2001 to 2002), now Sony Pictures Television (previously Sony Pictures Television Studios from 2020 to 2023 and currently Sony Pictures since 2026); nighttime version distributed since September 19, 1983 by King World, now CBS Media Ventures (previously CBS Broadcasting as its temporary distributor from 2024 to 2025))
- The All New Jeopardy! (1978–1979)
- Dance Fever (1979–1987; co-production with and distributed by 20th Century Fox Television)
- Headline Chasers (1985–1986; co-production with Wink Martindale Enterprises; distributed by King World)
- Buzzword (1986; unsold pilot for NBC)
- Strike A Match (1987; unsold pilot for CBS)
- Winfall (1988; unsold pilot for CBS hosted by Clint Holmes)
- Monopoly (1990; co-production with King World)
- Super Jeopardy! (1990; co-production with King World)
- Ruckus (1991; co-production with Columbia Pictures Television)
