= Fast Draw =

Fast draw is the ability to quickly draw a handgun and accurately fire it upon a target in the process.

Fast Draw may refer to:

- Fast Draw (game show), a television show originally broadcast in 1968
- "Fast Draw", a song by Jinjer from Duél (Jinjer album)
- Fast Draw, a character from G.I. Joe: A Real American Hero
