= Whirlybirds =

American TV series

- Also known as: The Whirlybirds; Copter Patrol
- Genre: Adventure
- Created by: Art Napoleon; Jo Napoleon
- Starring: Kenneth Tobey; Craig Hill; Sandra Spence; Nancy Hale
- Country of origin: United States
- Original language: English
- No. of seasons: 3
- No. of episodes: 111

Production
- Executive producers: Mort Briskin; N. Gayle Gitterman
- Camera setup: Single-camera
- Running time: 25 minutes
- Production company: Desilu Productions

Original release
- Network: First-run syndication
- Release: February 4, 1957 – January 18, 1960

Whirlybirds (sometimes called The Whirlybirds or Copter Patrol) is a syndicated American drama/adventure television series, which aired for 111 episodes — broadcast from February 4, 1957, through January 18, 1960. It was produced by Desilu Studios.

== Plot synopsis ==
The program features the exploits of Chuck Martin (Kenneth Tobey) and Pete "P. T." Moore (Craig Hill), owners of a fictitious helicopter chartering company, Whirlybirds, Inc., in the Western United States. Martin and Moore sell their services to various clients at the fictional airport Longwood Field.

The Whirlybirds series was, like I Love Lucy, The Untouchables, and later Star Trek, a product of Desilu Studios. One particular episode of I Love Lucy, Number 140, became pivotal to the Bell 47's public image as the definitive light helicopter of the 1950s. In No. 140, titled "Bon Voyage" and first aired on CBS on January 16, 1956, Lucy Ricardo misses the sailing of her trans-Atlantic ocean liner and commandeers a friendly pilot of a Bell 47G to fly her to the ship; Jack Albertson guest stars in this episode. Down she goes on the hoist, in a studio sequence carefully staged using a 47G cabin mockup. Desilu Studios, intrigued by the Bell 47 and its manufacturer, began discussions with Bell Aircraft about how the entertainment potential of the Bell 47 might be further developed for a television audience. The result of this collaboration became The Whirlybirds.

Tobey and Hill did not fly the helicopters on the show. That task was handled by professional helicopter pilots Ed Fuderich, Bob Gilbreath, and Harry Hauss of National Helicopter Service, Inc.

After production of the series ended, Kenneth Tobey reprised his role as Chuck Martin in episode #223 of the long-running television series, Lassie. Titled "The Rescue", the Lassie episode was broadcast on October 2, 1960. Chuck Martin uses a Bell 47G to rescue a trapped Timmy Martin (Jon Provost).

== Production notes ==
The series was originally supposed to air on CBS, but was instead put into syndication by CBS Films. Series filming started in 1956.

The first four episodes were titled The Whirlybirds and the rest simply Whirlybirds. Many episodes were directed by Harve Foster and Robert Altman. The creators were Art Napoleon and Jo Napoleon. Assistant Directors Bruce Bilson and Sid Sidman handle 2nd unit filming.

The series was filmed on location in California. The production first used the Santa Susanna Airport in Simi Valley. The airport, no longer in existence, was near the Iverson Movie Ranch, a dude ranch used to film westerns. Later episodes were filmed at the San Fernando Airport, which is also now closed. Much of the open area seen around both airports in the series has since been developed.

=== Helicopters used ===
The two helicopter types used were Bell models, a 47G and a 47J Ranger; the tail numbers were N975B and N2838B (and N1538B as back-up), respectively. In reality, many helicopters played the role of N975B. Other Bell 47Gs owned by National Helicopter Service were used in the filming with "N975B" decals covering their actual registrations.

=== Promotion ===
CBS Television Film Sales spent more than $1 million to promote Whirlybirds. Promotions ran in 100 markets. Related events included a Miss Whirlybirds beauty pageant, a helicopter air show, and premier parties in some cities.

== Cast ==
- Kenneth Tobey as Chuck Martin
- Craig Hill as P.T. Moore
- Nancy Hale as Helen Carter
- Sandra Spence as Janet Culver (season 1)

=== Recurring ===
- Raymond Bailey as Mr. Culver (season 1)
- Jimmy Baird as Tommy Fuller

== Guest stars ==
- Charles Aidman
- Jeanne Bates
- Edward Binns
- Whit Bissell
- Edgar Buchanan
- Johnny Crawford
- Mike Connors
- Walter Coy
- Francis De Sales
- Ann Doran
- Donna Douglas
- Bill Erwin
- Frank Ferguson
- Bruce Gordon
- Dabbs Greer
- Ron Hagerthy
- Stacy Harris
- Darryl Hickman
- Connie Hines
- Michael Hinn
- June Kenney
- Brett King
- Gail Kobe
- Robert Vaughn
- Ethel Waters
- Tyler McVey
- Joyce Meadows
- John M. Pickard
- Mike Ragan
- Paul Richards
- James Seay
- Arthur Space
- Fay Spain
- Gary Vinson
- Werner Klemperer - Ep. 17
- Gavin MacLeod - Ep.61 & 67
- Ed Platt - Ep.8
- Claude Akins - Ep.5

== Episodes status ==
No officially authorized DVD sets are available. The U.S. National Archives possesses a complete set of original 16 mm prints. The original 35mm film prints of the series are no longer available; unfortunately, extant video copies are inferior with poor contrast/low-resolution images, some emulsion scratches, and with 16mm projector film-gate dirt visible in the frame corners. Considering the many generations of dubs made of this series, the soundtracks of most episodes remain in relative high fidelity.

== Syndication ==
After production of Whirlybirds ended, CBS returned 39 of the 111 episodes to syndication and retitled the series Copter Patrol.

== International airings ==
In the United Kingdom, it was shown by the BBC in the late 1950s and early 1960s and repeated in the 1970s and 1980s. In Italy, RAI dubbed many episodes in the early 1960s with the title Avventure in elicottero. It was broadcast in Japan in the early 1960s sponsored by Sony electronics and featured a Japanese-registered Bell 47J with "Sony" on the doors in a special introduction.

== Episodes list ==
=== Season 1: 1957 ===
No. overall	No. in season	Title	Original release date
1	1	"The Big U"	January 3, 1957
After Chuck and P.T. complete an aerial photography assignment, they get hired to look for a drug store owner's missing father-in-law who is a "weekend" uranium prospector. They find him with his legs pinned under a boulder. After freeing him using the helicopter, Chuck & P.T. find out that he has found a uranium strike and go after the two amateur prospector's that stole his claim map. Also titled "The Uranium Hunters."
2	2	"Rampage"	January 10, 1957
Chuck and P.T. track Congo, a sick gorilla who is terrorizing the countryside after he escaped from a circus train when his trainer tried to give him a shot of penicillin.
3	3	"Boy on the Roof"	January 17, 1957
A young man, with revenge in his heart, climbs on the roof of a building and keeps police at bay with a high-powered rifle. P.T. takes a reporter up to the brother, thinking the reporter has good intentions. Unknown to P.T. the sleazy reporter has ulterior motives.
4	4	"Fire Flight"	January 24, 1957
Chuck and P.T. race against the clock to find three climbers trapped on a mountain by a forest fire.
5	5	"Hot Wire"	January 31, 1957
Chuck and P.T. fly through a dangerous windstorm to deliver a ventilator.
6	6	"Mountain Flight"	February 7, 1957
When a man hires Chuck and P.T. to fly him around for a weekend hunting trip, they discover that his prey is human.
7	7	"Ghost Town Flight"	February 14, 1957
While three boys are camping in the mountains, they explore a California ghost town where miners once lived and the two older boys accidentally fall into an old mine shaft. When the youngest boy goes for help, Chuck and P.T. see him from their helicopter, pick him up, fly him to a hospital, and then go back to save the other two.
8	8	"Hostage"	February 21, 1957
Three escaped convicts steal a small airplane in an attempt to make a getaway, but when they discover that the plane is short of fuel, they return to the airfield and take a hostage.
9	9	"Diamond Smugglers"	February 28, 1957
Chuck and P.T. are accused of smuggling when their helicopter is seen in Mexico on the same day that diamonds go missing and allegedly are moved across the United States border.
10	10	"Lynch Mob"	March 7, 1957
Chuck and P.T. fly a reporter into the mountains for a story when they discover a lynch mob chasing a man who shot a deputy sheriff.
11	11	"Sky Net"	March 14, 1957
Chuck and P.T. fly a hunter into the mountains who is intent on tracking and killing a cougar.
12	12	"Prison Break"	March 21, 1957
A woman planning to use a helicopter in a prison break poses as a student pilot.
13	13	"Top of the Mountain"	March 28, 1957
Chuck and P.T. fly a box supposedly full of much-needed medicine to a rich man's mountaintop retreat.
14	14	"Operation Blue Hen"	April 4, 1957
P.T. and Chuck are hired to fly a bomb into a canyon for testing.
15	15	"Human Bomb"	April 11, 1957
A bank robber forces Chuck and P.T. to help him at gunpoint.
16	16	"Missing Witness"	April 18, 1957
Chuck and P.T. come to the aid of a couple who are chased by members of an organized crime ring after they agree to testify in court against a crime syndicate boss.
17	17	"The Egg Code"	April 25, 1957
P.T. and Chuck spot a group that is spying on government installations and warn the United States Army.
18	18	"Superstition Mountain"	May 2, 1957
After they are hired to fly supplies to a remote gold mining operation, Chuck and P.T. encounter a psychopathic killer who is convinced that an ancient Apache Indian superstition will hide his crimes and bring harm to the Whirlybirds.
19	19	"Homicide Haven"	May 9, 1957
While flying over the desert, Chuck and P.T. discover a well-hidden house and find a man living there who claims to be a reclusive writer — but Chuck believes that he has seen the man somewhere before.
20	20	"Riptide"	May 14, 1957
A pilot grounds himself after a bad crash, and his friends Chuck and P.T. try to help him regain the courage to fly again.
21	21	"The Black Pearl"	May 23, 1957
A pearl diver hires Chuck and P.T. to fly him to an oyster bed he has discovered, promising them a share of the pearls he finds if they get him there ahead of his former partner.
22	22	"Illegal Entry"	May 30, 1957
Chuck and P.T. respond to a distress signal to fly a passenger from a yacht to a hospital, but are suspicious because the passenger is covered from head to toe in bandages.
23	23	"Lady Luck"	June 6, 1957
A man hires P.T. and Chuck to fly him to Las Vegas — then he decides to leave Las Vegas suddenly, with a group of cheated gamblers pursuing him.
24	24	"Hide and Seek"	June 13, 1957
A nine-year-old boy hides in the trunk of a car, loses consciousness, and is trapped as the car is prepared to be crushed for scrap.
25	25	"Hobson's Choice"	June 20, 1957
P.T. films a reclusive man′s rescue of a famous actress on a movie location. After a newspaper publishes a photograph of the rescue, the man is outraged by the violation of his privacy and tries to shoot P.T.
26	26	"Crisis"	June 27, 1957
A woman hires P.T. and Chuck to fly her to her sister's house in a remote location in the mountains. During the flight, she tells them to land far from where her sister lives and then disappears, and they begin a search for her.
27	27	"Journey to the Past"	July 4, 1957
A wealthy man hires Chuck and P.T. to transport him to the site of some pre-Aztec ruins as found on a map he received from a stranger. In this episode Nancy Hale joined the cast as Helen Carter, replacing Sandra Spence as The Whirlybirds' secretary, and she remained with the show for the rest of its run.
28	28	"Aerial Circus"	July 11, 1957
P.T. and Chuck become suspicious of a brother-and-sister circus aerial team who learn how to fly a helicopter as part of their act, then return a helicopter with damaged pontoons just after the robbery of an armored car.
29	29	"Cycle of Terror"	July 18, 1957
Chuck and P.T. try to stop a sniper on a motorcycle from terrorizing a town.
30	30	"Fury Canyon"	July 25, 1957
A newspaper reporter enlists the help of P.T. and Chuck to search for a family that has mysteriously disappeared from their trailer in the desert.
31	31	"The Rustlers"	August 7, 1957
Cattle rustlers use a unique method of stealing cows from ranchers.
32	32	"I'll Get Even"	August 8, 1957
Chuck and P.T. help a special agent search a chemical plant for a bomb after a disgruntled employee phones in a bomb threat.
33	33	"Incident in Del Rio"	August 15, 1957
A ranch owner hires Chuck and P.T. to help identify something that flies over his ranch at night making high-pitched sounds and scaring his workers.
34	34	"Sky Hook"	August 22, 1957
After a small boat is wrecked on rocks near a lighthouse during a storm, Chuck, P.T., and their helicopter must rescue the injured men on board.
35	35	"The Secret Cove"	August 29, 1957
After a rich sportsman disappears in his yacht, his wife hires Chuck and P.T. to find the boat and him.
36	36	"Take a Little, Leave a Little"	September 5, 1957
Chuck and P.T. are hired to fly payroll funds to a construction site but are delayed by a storm. They store the money in the Whirlybirds office safe — and then discover that some of it is missing.
37	37	"Airborne Gold"	September 12, 1957
A melon farmer hires Chuck and P.T. to patrol his land, which is spread over both sides of the U.S.-Mexican border, and without their knowledge hides gold aboard their helicopter as a way to smuggle it across the border.
38	38	"The Iron Mountain"	September 17, 1957
P.T. and Chuck must fly a federal agent into a remote area in the mountains to deal with a reclusive old man who refuses to sell his land for mining.
39	39	"Panic at Green Ridge"	September 24, 1957
After a woman vacationing at a mountain cabin with her family comes down with a case of appendicitis, her husband crashes his car as he drives down the mountain to go for help.

=== Season 2: 1958–59 ===
No. overall	No. in season	Title	Original release date
40	1	"Seven Were Trapped"	February 3, 1958
When P.T. and Chuck radio for a weather report, they are informed that a mine has collapsed and trapped a group of people. When they arrive on the scene, they discover that the collapse is much worse than they first thought. This was the first episode featuring the Bell 47J Ranger helicopter (2838B).
41	2	"The Ashley Case"	February 10, 1958
While a man convicted of murdering his missing wife is appealing his case and claiming that he is innocent, P.T. and Chuck find the license plate of the man's wife's car, indicating that the car and her body could be at the bottom of one of a number of local lakes.
42	3	"Hit and Run"	February 17, 1958
While P.T. and Chuck are making aerial inspections, they witness a hit-and-run accident below them. They notify the police, transport the victim to a local hospital, and fly back and use their helicopter to recover the crashed vehicle from a ravine — but the vehicle disappears before the police arrive.
43	4	"The Runaway"	February 24, 1958
Doctors hire P.T. and Chuck to help them find an illegal immigrant from Mexico who has a highly contagious disease, is infecting everyone he comes in contact with, and is fleeing from medical help because of his fear that he will be deported to Mexico if he is found.
44	5	"The Brothers"	March 3, 1958
Chuck and P.T. search for two missing boys — a boy who ran away from home after a fight with his father, and his seven-year-old brother, who apparently has gone searching for him.
45	6	"Search for an Unknown Man"	March 10, 1958
After receiving a letter requesting their help, Chuck and P.T. decide to investigate by flying to the remote desert mining town in Nevada it was mailed from. They find that the town is controlled by a mobster and his henchmen, all of whom are covering up a kidnapping.
46	7	"The Killer"	March 17, 1958
A woman claims that the promising young boxer Chuck and P.T. are flying around killed her husband, and they decide to investigate her allegation.
47	8	"The Unwanted"	March 24, 1958
A boy who leaves home after a family argument is kidnapped and held for ransom, and Chuck and P.T. help the police look for him.
48	9	"Mister Q"	March 31, 1958
Chuck and P.T. land to help a boy they saw take a hard fall on a horse. The horse is badly injured, and they fetch the boy's father and a veterinarian, who decide that the animal must be euthanized. Distraught at the loss of his horse, the boy runs away, and Chuck and P.T. begin a search for him.
49	10	"Seven Orchids"	April 7, 1958
A postage-due package arrives at the office of Whirlybirds, Inc. It contains a US$500 bill that has been torn in half, broken glass, and seven orchids. Chuck and P.T. decide to locate the sender and discover a sinister plot against a wealthy family at an abandoned farm.
50	11	"Father and Son"	April 14, 1958
A father hires the Whirlybirds team to fly him and his sick son to see the Grand Canyon from the air and then to spend a special time at a football game. During the trip, Chuck and P.T. find out that the man is a crime boss who is using the flight to avoid police road blocks and searches on the ground, and he pulls a gun on them and forces them to stay in the air until the boy becomes very ill.
51	12	"Time Out of Mind"	April 21, 1958
Just after Chuck and P.T. take delivery of their new Bell 47 helicopter, a man sneaks into it and takes it for an unauthorized flight. After he lands, he claims to be suffering from amnesia, that he thinks he may be a pilot, and that he hoped the flight would help him regain his memory. When a reporter starts to look into the fantastic tale, however, clues begin to point to the possibility of an unsavory past — and murder.
52	13	"Buy Me a Miracle"	April 28, 1958
A mild-mannered and kindhearted man hires Chuck and P.T. to fly him to a small Mexican village in the middle of the night. Once every ten years this village celebrates the "Day Of Miracles" and he wishes to repay a long-standing debt to the village by staging a miracle. The "miracle" happens, but during the return flight the man requests that the pilots turn him into the police when they land because he embezzled the money which he used to create his "miracle." Chuck and P.T. do as he asks, but decide to try and help him in any way they can.
53	14	"Infra-Red"	May 5, 1958
The sheriff's department enlists Chuck and P.T. to help it catch three drug traffickers who somehow elude them at the same place every time they follow them through traffic. The pilots come up with an ingenious way to trace the traffickers' car, which leads them to the stash and a surprising destination.
54	15	"An Apple for the Teacher"	May 12, 1958
Chuck takes his former high school teacher on her first helicopter ride to vacation at a resort hotel. After dropping her off, he remembers that it is the first day of school. He runs back into the hotel and finds that no one by her name is listed as staying there.
55	16	"Blind Date"	May 19, 1958
Julie Cavanaugh wins a free vacation in a newspaper′s promotional contest. As part of the promotion, she poses for a photographer as Chuck and P.T. prepare for takeoff — and while she does, someone shoots at her from a speeding car.
56	17	"Blind Victory"	May 26, 1958
While Chuck and P.T. help the police search for a killer, a car accident happens below them. They land to help and transport a beautiful woman to the hospital, not knowing that she is connected with the murderer — and now is in danger of losing her eyesight if a corneal transplant donor is not located.
57	18	"Copters and Robbers"	June 2, 1958
After a young woman runs away from her new husband, she has second thoughts and hires the Whirlybirds team to fly her back to him, only to find that he has been murdered.
58	19	"If I Were King"	June 9, 1958
A man who already has traveled 12,000 miles (19,000 km) hires P.T. and Chuck to fly him on the last leg of his trip to a secret rendezvous, only to have an assassin take aim at him.
59	20	"Dog Gone"	June 16, 1958
As Chuck and P.T. are about to leave for a much-anticipated fishing trip on a river, a business executive persuades them to postpone their trip to help in the search for his daughter's missing dog — and there is an added catch to the whole problem.
60	21	"Fear"	June 23, 1958
When a fire gets out of control, three young men from a juvenile detention facility volunteer to help fight it, only to get trapped in a canyon where Chuck and P.T. must come to their rescue. But their fear doesn't end there.
61	22	"Time to Kill"	June 30, 1958
An investment broker who lost a lot of his clients' money decides to hire someone to kill him so that his life insurance money can reimburse his customers.
62	23	"Two Came Back"	July 7, 1958
Chuck and P.T. search for a young man who disappears during a biology hike in the woods.
63	24	"Summit Meeting"	July 14, 1958
United States Army Intelligence hires Whirlybirds, Inc., to fly a scientist to a remote rocket testing facility because using an Army transport would be too visible — but the Army's secret is out.
64	25	"Robert Dixon, M.D."	October 20, 1958
After a physician experiences cardiac arrest, his son, also a doctor, hires P.T. and Chuck to fly him to his father's unknown appointment.
65	26	"Uncle Pete"	October 27, 1958
When P.T. and Chuck arrive for a crop-dusting job at a ranch, they find that the ranch foreman nearly beaten to death and all his money stolen. They must race the clock to get help for the injured foreman, and then search for his attacker.
66	27	"Hideout"	November 3, 1958
Chuck and P.T. unwittingly fly a young man right to the doorstep of a killer.
67	28	"Baby Face"	November 10, 1958
Chuck and P.T. land in the desert to help a couple who appear to be eloping, but soon discover that they actually are fleeing a murder rap.
68	29	"Glamor"	November 17, 1958
Top Hollywood movie star Jessie Johns hires Chuck and P.T. to fly her to see her ex-husband at the bank where he works. She demands that he turn over their daughter Sue, whom she has legal custody of. He reluctantly agrees to do so later that day, but when she arrives to pick up Sue she finds that he and his new wife, Jean, have fled with the girl and apparently some of the bank′s funds, using a back mountain road that is scheduled for demolition at any moment. Chuck, P.T. and Jessie board the Whirlybird, Inc., helicopter to try to intercept the car before it is buried by rocks.
69	30	"Address Unknown"	November 24, 1958
The Whirlybirds must reunite a Korean War hero with his girlfriend.
70	31	"The Story of Sister Bridget"	December 1, 1958
Chuck and P.T. pick up Sister Bridgit, a nun who needs to see one of her former charges who now is carrying a gun.
71	32	"Midnight Show"	December 8, 1958
A ventriloquist hires Chuck and P.T. to fly him and his gorgeous partner to a benefit show. When they get there, however, the location is not that of a show, but rather the cliffside where the ventriloquist′s former assistant mysteriously plunged to her death.
72	33	"27 Pieces of Gold"	December 15, 1958
A young woman′s husband is off searching for treasure and she has not heard from him for a while, so she hires Chuck and P.T. to find him, not knowing the assignment means danger.
73	34	"Dead on Arrival"	December 22, 1958
P.T. and Chuck make a flight with a passenger who appears to sleep the whole way. When they arrive at their destination, however, they discover that their passenger actually is dead.
74	35	"An Act of Fate"	December 29, 1958
The Whirlybirds crew gets hired to fly a reporter to a location to interview a man for the "Mr. Average American" story, but when they get there, they find the subject of the interview is anything but average.
75	36	"Always a Gentleman"	January 5, 1959
While pursuing an escaped prisoner, P.T. and Chuck suddenly find that they have flown into a United States Army target range.
76	37	"Road Block"	January 12, 1959
During a flight to pick up a company's payroll, Chuck and P.T. see a man murder another man and dump his body into a ravine. They soon join the search for the murderer.
77	38	"C.O.D."	January 19, 1959
Chuck and P.T. fly a woman to greet her husband when he is released from prison after serving time for robbery. When the man gets back to his home, three other criminals are there waiting for him.
78	39	"Rest in Peace"	January 26, 1959
Chuck and P.T. are invited to a secret business meeting, only to end up witnessing a murder.

=== Season 3: 1959–60 ===
No. overall	No. in season	Title	Original release date
79	1	"A Matter of Trust"	April 6, 1959
Chuck and P.T. fly their friend of many years, Mrs. Dudley, to her summer home in the mountains. When they return from the trip, they discover that the bank where she had worked had been robbed the previous evening
80	2	"Guilty of Old Age"	April 13, 1959
P.T. and Chuck get drawn into the middle of a police department's modernization process concerning previous and new procedures for dealing with violent juvenile offenders.
81	3	"Christmas in June"	April 20, 1959
A little girl named Barbara comes to Whirlybirds, Inc., and asks Chuck and P.T. to fly her to the North Pole so that she can ask Santa Claus to bring her father home. She realizes that it is only June, but she wants to go early to give Santa Claus some time to get it done. Chuck and P.T. visit Barbara's mother and find out that Barbara's father had been in prison and had not come home even though he had been paroled a year earlier. The Whirlybirds find Barbara's father, then rescue Barbara just as she decides to walk to the North Pole on her own. As the family is reunited, Chuck says, "Christmas came in June."
82	4	"Til Death Do Us Part"	April 27, 1959
P.T. and Chuck get a phone call to come pick up a woman named Mrs. Foster and fly her to Mexico, but when they get to her home, its residents do not know who they are talking about and claim that no such call was made.
83	5	"Time Limit"	May 4, 1959
Chuck and P.T. fly two men to a fishing cabin, not realizing that they are burglars who have been cracking area safes and then making their escape dressed in women's attire — or that they want to use Chuck's helicopter for a getaway.
84	6	"Experiment X-74"	May 11, 1959
The Whirlybirds are hired to find an experimental United States Air Force jet. During their search, a group of foreign spies captures Chuck.
85	7	"His Brother's Keeper"	May 18, 1959
During a daylight robbery of a courier carrying a million dollars in diamonds at the home airport of the Whirlybirds, the off-duty police lieutenant serving as the courier's bodyguard is shot and killed. The police lieutenant's brother hires Chuck and P.T. to locate the man, leading the pilots to a shocking surprise.
86	8	"Obsession"	May 25, 1959
Chuck and P.T. are hired to fly a sedated homicidal mental patient to a sanitarium for tests and evaluation, but during the flight they realize that the "patient" is actually a doctor who has been overpowered and drugged, leaving the real patient on the loose to commit murder.
87	9	"The Challenge"	June 1, 1959
After Dr. Clark Evans loses a young patient in surgery, he becomes a recluse in the mountains, until he receives a note informing him that his niece has the same affliction. Evans doubts the veracity of the message, and Chuck and P.T. have to try to convince him to fly back with them to help his niece.
88	10	"The Big Lie"	June 8, 1959
A cleaning woman at an orphanage tries to cure a small boy of his tendency to tell lies about celebrities. After the boy gets in trouble when he runs away from an orphanage and accepts a ride from criminals, Chuck and P.T. come to his assistance. Ethel Waters guest stars as the cleaning woman.
89	11	"Without a Net"	June 15, 1959
A former circus comedian who used to perform on the high wire as "The Great Herman" comes out of retirement and must overcome a bad case of nerves. Strother Martin guest stars as the comedian.
90	12	"The Fugitive"	June 22, 1959
Chuck and P.T. fly a husband and wife to a vacation spot so they can celebrate their wedding anniversary. When they arrive, police officers immediately take the husband — an escaped convict — into custody.
91	13	"The Perfect Crime"	June 29, 1959
Chuck and P.T. find themselves in the middle of a town bent on hanging an eccentric old man who has confessed to committing every crime that has happened recently, and they decide to protect him.
92	14	"The Unknown Soldier"	July 6, 1959
Chuck and P.T. come to the assistance of a woman whose husband, long thought to be dead, contacts her to demand money just before she is about to remarry.
93	15	"Two of a Kind"	July 13, 1959
Two men who have an amazingly close resemblance to each other — one of them a serial killer on the lam and the other a timid, unemployed husband — hire Chuck and P.T., making it nearly impossible for the police and the pilots to know who is who.
94	16	"In Ways Mysterious"	July 20, 1959
The Whirlybirds team helps a minister rediscover his faith when their helicopter becomes an answer to his prayers.
95	17	"The Deadly Game"	July 27, 1959
Chuck and P.T. soon discover that the clues provided in what at first appears to be just a fun scavenger hunt actually lead to danger and death.
96	18	"Bankrupt Alibi"	August 3, 1959
A well-known man known as an upstanding citizen gets his son to confess to a hit-and-run accident he committed so that he can preserve his reputation in the town.
97	19	"The Black Maria"	August 10, 1959
An escaped criminal forces his gravely ill wife to leave her hospital bed and join him while he evades the police.
98	20	"Sitting Duck"	August 17, 1959
During a flight, Chuck and P.T. clearly see a man choking a woman near a remote farm, but after they land they cannot find either the man or the woman.
99	21	"Wanted: Alive"	August 24, 1959
Chuck and P.T. search the desert for an overdue plane.
100	22	"The Deacon"	August 31, 1959
A church deacon hires Chuck and P.T. to fly him to a speaking engagement, but then wonder about his real purpose after meeting some thugs at the airfield who threaten the man.
101	23	"Rita Ames Is Missing"	September 7, 1959
P.T. and Chuck are hired to fly a young film star to meet her fiancé at a secret location.
102	24	"The Story of Mary Scott"	September 14, 1959
A police lieutenant enlists the help of Whirlybirds, Inc., to help him discover why a young girl committed suicide.
103	25	"Pink Is For Death"	September 21, 1959
Chuck and P.T. help the police search for a man who knows the antidote to a deadly poison a young man drank thinking it was soda pop.
104	26	"Star Witness"	September 28, 1959
Chuck learns that a man recently acquitted of murdering his wife actually is guilty.
105	27	"Mr. Jinx"	October 5, 1959
The pilots fly a newspaper reporter to a remote prison so that he can talk to an inmate he believes is an innocent man. After they return to the Whirlybirds, Inc., office they learn the prisoner was a stowaway in the helicopter and fled. Assuming the reporter conspired with the convict to help the convict escape, the prison's warden calls the police, setting off a series of tumultuous events.
106	28	"File 777"	October 12, 1959
A tough guy named Grimes tries to force P.T. and Chuck to reveal the location of Sydney Evans, a customer of Whirlybirds, Inc. The pilots refuse to give out any information, but that night after closing, Grimes breaks into the Whirlybirds hangar looking for Evans's file.
107	29	"Hot Cargo"	October 19, 1959
A man hires Chuck and P.T. to take aerial photographs of the governor making a speech at a local fair. They do not know that the man plans to kill the governor for his condemnation of the man's son.
108	30	"Shoot Out"	October 26, 1959
A rancher with a short time left to live asks Chuck and P.T. to spread his ashes from the air over the beautiful countryside of his ranch after his death.
109	31	"Man, You Kill Me"	November 2, 1959
After P.T. and Chuck fly a jazz musician to his nightclub date, he is found murdered.
110	32	"Dead Wrong"	November 19, 1959
A waitress whose boyfriend is a wanted felon is astonished when she waits on a customer at the restaurant where she works who looks exactly like her boyfriend, and she comes up with a plan to turn the lookalike stranger in to the police in place of her bank-robbing lover.
111	33	"Four Little Indians"	January 18, 1960
A man escapes from prison and plans to kill the people who were responsible for his conviction, including P.T. and Chuck.

== Critical response ==
A review of the premiere episode in the trade publication Variety complimented Tobey and Hill as "a couple of appealing heroes" and said that except for the use of a helicopter it seemed to be "a routine adventure series".
