= John Baer (actor) =

American actor (1923–2006)

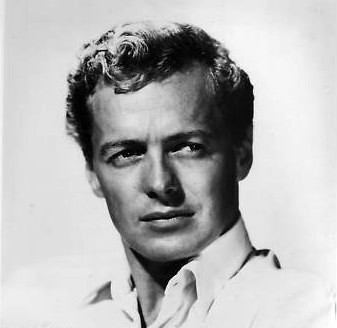
- in 1953
- Born: June 6, 1923; York, Pennsylvania, U.S.
- Died: January 7, 2006 (aged 82); Newhall, Santa Clarita, California, U.S.
- Occupation: Actor
- Years active: 1950–1974
- Spouse: Noureen Jauregui (1952–?)

John Baer (June 6, 1923 – January 7, 2006) was an American actor. He appeared in over 60 film and television productions between 1950 and 1974. Among the highlights of his career was the leading role in the television series Terry and the Pirates (1953). One of his better-known film roles was as Paul Trochard, the greedy heir who gets killed by a snake, in Michael Curtiz's comedy We're No Angels (1955). While he spent most of his film career in supporting roles or bit parts, Baer also played the lead role in Night of the Blood Beast, a horror film by Gene and Roger Corman.

== Partial filmography ==
- The West Point Story (1950) - Young Cadet (uncredited)
- The Flying Missile (1950) - Jet Pilot (uncredited)
- Operation Pacific (1951) - Fighter Pilot (uncredited)
- Target Unknown (1951) - Pilot (uncredited)
- Air Cadet (1951) - Cadet (uncredited)
- Fighting Coast Guard (1951) - Upper-Classman (uncredited)
- Saturday's Hero (1951) - Turner Wylie (uncredited)
- Arizona Manhunt (1951) - Deputy Jim Brown
- The Family Secret (1951) - Boy at Birthday Party (uncredited)
- Superman and the Mole Men (1951) - Dr. Reed (uncredited)
- Indian Uprising (1952) - Lt. Whitley
- About Face (1952) - Hal Carlton
- The Battle at Apache Pass (1952) - Pvt. Bolin (uncredited)
- Rainbow 'Round My Shoulder (1952) - Red (uncredited)
- Stars and Stripes Forever (1952) - Chorus Boy at 'El Capitan' Rehearsal (uncredited)
- Above and Beyond (1952) - Captain (uncredited)
- Terry and the Pirates (1952-1953, TV series, 18 episodes) - Terry Lee
- The Mississippi Gambler (1953) - Laurent Dureau
- Down Among the Sheltering Palms (1953) - Officer (uncredited)
- Three Sailors and a Girl (1953) - Sailor (uncredited)
- Riding Shotgun (1954) - Deputy Ross Hughes
- The Miami Story (1954) - Ted Delacorte
- City of Shadows (1955) - Dan Mason
- We're No Angels (1955) - Paul Trochard
- Huk! (1956) - Bart Rogers
- Night of the Blood Beast (1958) - Steve Dunlap
- Tarawa Beachhead (1958) - Johnny Campbell
- Guns Girls and Gangsters (1959) - Steve Thomas
- Hawaiian Eye (1960, TV series, 2 episodes) - Alan Terry / Victor Brindisi
- The Cat Burglar (1961) - Alan Sheridan
- Fear No More (1961) - Keith Burgess
- The Chapman Report (1962) - Boy Barclay (uncredited)
- Leave It to Beaver (1962, TV series, 1 episode) - Assistant
- The Beverly Hillbillies (1966, TV series, 1 episode) - Nelson
- Bikini Paradise (1967) - Lt. Anthony Crane
- The Late Liz (1971) - Arthur Bryson
- Bonnie's Kids (1972)
- Mission: Impossible (1973, TV series, 1 episode) - Belden
- Gunsmoke (1973-1974, TV series, 2 episodes) - Nichols / Johnny's father (final appearance)

== Selected Television ==
Year	Title	Role	Notes
1952-1953	Terry and the Pirates	Terry Lee	17 Episodes
1959	Wagon Train	Clay Willis	Season 2, Episode 37 "The Steele Family Story"
1960	Wanted Dead or Alive	Jim Lansing	Season 3, Episode 10 "The Medicine Man"
1973-1974	Gunsmoke	Nichols / Johnny's father	2 Episodes
