= Headline Chasers =

- Genre: Game show
- Created by: Wink Martindale
- Directed by: Kevin McCarthy
- Presented by: Wink Martindale
- Announcer: Johnny Gilbert
- Country of origin: United States
- Original language: English
- No. of seasons: 1
- No. of episodes: 185

Production
- Executive producers: Wink Martindale; Merv Griffin
- Producers: John Tobyansen; David M. Greenfield
- Production locations: TAV Celebrity Theater; Hollywood, California
- Running time: approx. 22 minutes
- Production companies: Merv Griffin Enterprises; Wink Martindale Enterprises

Original release
- Release: September 9, 1985 – May 23, 1986

Headline Chasers is an American game show that ran daily in syndication from September 9, 1985, to May 23, 1986, with reruns airing until September 5. The series was hosted by Wink Martindale, who also created the series and was its executive producer, with Johnny Gilbert serving as announcer. It was produced by Wink Martindale Enterprises and Merv Griffin Enterprises with King World Productions, Griffin's partner for his other syndicated game show offerings, as distributor. Headline Chasers was recorded at TAV Celebrity Theater in Hollywood, the same studio which housed The Merv Griffin Show (which, at the time Headline Chasers premiered, was still in production).

This show pitted two couples against each other solving Hangman-style word puzzles designed to look like newspaper headlines, as well as answering questions about the subjects of these puzzles, in an attempt to win money.

== Conception ==
Wink Martindale claimed he came up with the idea for the show while reading the Los Angeles Times. Martindale's conception was originally known as Front Page, and he submitted the idea to Merv Griffin. Griffin was receptive to the idea, and he and Martindale struck a deal to try to sell the concept into syndication. Martindale served as executive producer and host of the series with his production company, Wink Martindale Enterprises, and Griffin's as co-packagers and King World, who was partnering with Griffin to distribute Wheel of Fortune and Jeopardy! in syndication at the time, serving the same role for what eventually became Headline Chasers.

In order to take over the roles of host and executive producer of the new series, Martindale left his previous long-term role as the host of one of Griffin's syndicated game show competitors in Tic Tac Dough, which he had hosted since 1978. He was replaced by Jim Caldwell.

== Game play ==
=== Main game ===
Headline Chasers was played in three rounds, referred to on-air as "editions" by Martindale in keeping with the newspaper theme of the program. Two teams, consisting primarily of married couples, competed on each episode.

In the first edition, a newspaper headline with various letters missing (referred to as an "altered headline") was presented to both couples, as well as the date on which the described event was reported. The value of each headline began at $500, and every few seconds, a clue was shown, additional letters were filled in, and the value decreased by $100. A maximum of four clues were available on each headline. Either couple could buzz-in at any time and guess. A correct answer won the money at stake, while a miss gave the opponents a choice between trying to solve it immediately or waiting for additional clues and letters. After a headline had been solved, Martindale asked two toss-up questions based on it, worth $100 each. Three altered headlines were played in this round. After several weeks of shows, a voice (mostly Gilbert's) told the home viewers how many words were in each headline.

During the second edition, the couples attempted to identify the subjects of magazine covers and video clips, which were purposely distorted in some way. For the magazine covers, an actual cover was used and the subject's face and anything referring to their identity was scrambled or blacked out. A maximum of four clues were shown on screen as in the first edition. For the video questions, the clips were scrambled to start and slowly came into focus while the audio could be heard without distortion. No on-screen clues were given, but Martindale read a brief clue before the clip began. The value of each puzzle began at $500 and decreased by $100 for each revealed clue (magazine covers) or for every few seconds that no one buzzed-in (video clips). If a couple buzzed-in and could not identify the subject, the value was frozen and the opponents received any remaining clues or could see the entire clip without distortion before making their guess. Two magazine covers and two video clips were played during this round.

The final edition featured altered headlines similar to the first one, but the value of each headline began at $1,000 and decreased with successive clues in a different sequence ($1,000, $800, $600, $200, and $100). Four altered headlines were played during the round. Two $200 toss-ups were played after each of the first three, while the fourth was followed by a single question for which each couple had to wager a portion of their score. The couple with the higher wager got the first chance at the question. A correct answer added the wager to their score, while a miss was deducted. In the latter case, the opposing couple was given the option to either answer for the value of their own wager or pass.

The couple in the lead following the final question won the game and moved on to the bonus round, and both teams kept their winnings. In the event of a tie, one last altered headline was played and the first couple to solve it won the game.

=== Headline Extra ===
The winning couple played this round alone for up to $5,000. They chose one of five categories, and an altered headline fitting it was revealed. After studying the headline for five seconds, they could either try to solve it immediately or ask for up to four clues. Any requested clues were displayed on the screen one at a time, but unlike in the main game, no additional letters were filled in. The couple had an additional seven seconds to study the headline as the clues were given. Solving the headline without any clues awarded $5,000, but each requested clue reduced the prize by $1,000. An incorrect guess at any point ended the round immediately.

A couple could win up to $23,600 in a single game, by solving every headline/cover/video clip for its maximum value, answering every toss-up correctly, wagering their entire total on the last question of the final edition and answering correctly, and solving the Headline Extra puzzle with no clues.
