= Terry and the Pirates (TV series) =

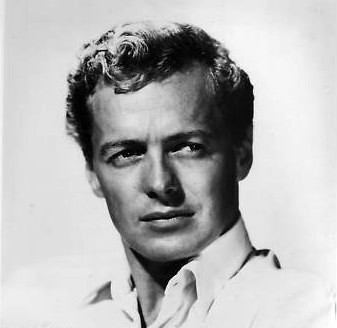
- John Baer as Terry Lee.
- Genre: Adventure
- Written by: Frank Burt; Milton Caniff; Oliver Crawford; Norman S. Hall; Arthur Pierson; Lou Rusoff; Barney A. Sarecky
- Directed by: Lew Landers; Arthur Pierson
- Starring: John Baer; Jack Reitzen; William Tracy; Sandra Spence; Gloria Saunders
- Country of origin: United States
- Original language: English
- No. of seasons: 1
- No. of episodes: 18

Production
- Executive producer: H. Alexander MacDonald
- Producer: Warren Lewis
- Cinematography: William E. Snyder
- Editors: Robert Golden; Maurice Wright
- Running time: 30 mins.

Original release
- Network: Syndication
- Release: June 26 – November 21, 1953

Terry and the Pirates is an American adventure series based on Milton Caniff's comic strip that was telecast from June 26 to November 21, 1953. The syndicated series ran for 18 episodes and was produced by Don Sharpe Enterprises. Canada Dry Ginger Ale was the show's original sponsor.

A version of Terry and the Pirates debuted on WABD-TV in New York City on November 25, 1952, broadcast on alternate Tuesdays at 7:30 p.m. Dougfair Productions was the packager, and Official Films was the distributor. Dick Irving was the director, and John and Gwen Bagni were the writers.

== Overview ==
USAAF Colonel Terry Lee (John Baer) heads to the Far East to locate a gold mine he inherited from his grandfather. Once in the Orient, Lee becomes a pilot with Air Cathay, a cargo and passenger airline owned and operated by the cunning Chopstick Joe (Jack Reitzen), who is not always honest. His friend and co-pilot is Charles C. Charles, aka Hotshot Charlie (William Tracy, who had played Terry Lee in the 1940 serial Terry and the Pirates), while the romantic interest is provided by the attractive blonde Burma (Sandra Spence). Lee has several encounters in thirteen episodes with his beautiful and mysterious nemesis, Lai Choi San, aka The Dragon Lady (Gloria Saunders).

In the pilot episode, "Macao Gold", Chopstick Joe was portrayed by Jack Kruschen and Burma was played by Mari Blanchard.

== Production ==
In 1951, Sam Katzman obtained the film rights to the comic strip from Douglas Fairbanks Jr but no film resulted.

Twenty-six episodes were filmed using the RKO-Pathe facilities.

== Home media ==
In 2007, Alpha Home Entertainment released four DVD sets of the episodes. Packaged with four episodes per Volume there are only sixteen of the eighteen. Episode 17 ("Overseer") and 18 ("The Diamond Maker") were not included. The episodes are not compiled in any order. The sets have been available from resellers on the internet.

== See also ==
- Terry and the Pirates (comic strip)
- Terry and the Pirates (radio serial)
