= Xanadu: The Marco Polo Musical =

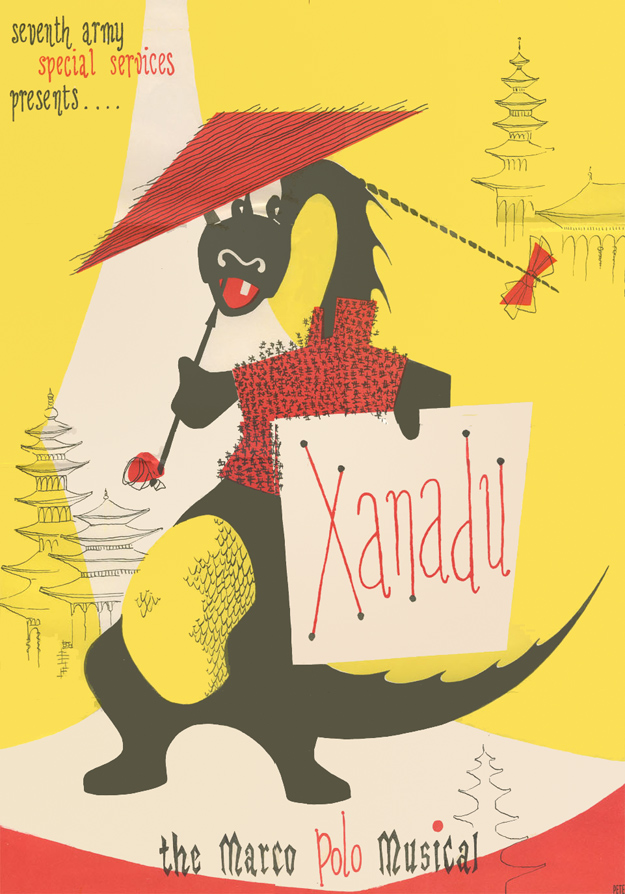
- Xanadu: The Marco Polo Musical poster
- Music: William Perry; William S. Wheeling
- Lyrics: William Perry; William S. Wheeling
- Productions: 1953 Stuttgart

Xanadu: The Marco Polo Musical is an original musical written and produced in 1953 by Seventh Army Special Services in Germany, the first of the numerous stage musicals, film musicals and songs inspired in part by the Samuel Taylor Coleridge poem Kubla Khan with its opening lines:

In Xanadu did Kubla Khan
A stately pleasure-dome decree
Where Alph, the sacred river, ran
Through caverns measureless to man
Down to a sunless sea.

The play featured the mythical Chinese/Mongol city of Xanadu, which is also a color associated with the Yuan dynasty.

The score was written by songwriting team William P. Perry and William S. Wheeling, both of whom had been drawn into the Armed Forces shortly after their graduation from Harvard University. The cast and other members of the creative team were transferred from military units all over the world, and in spite of frequent cast changes as draftees were returned home, the show ran for five years and played both civilian and military theatres throughout Europe.

== History of the show ==
In the early 1950s, Seventh Army Special Services, headquartered in Stuttgart, Germany, was a lively center of entertainment, sending out soldier variety shows featuring singers like Private Vito Farinola (Vic Damone) and the newly formed Rhythm Aces. But with the encouragement of Lt. General Manton Eddy, General Charles Bolte and particularly General Anthony McAuliffe, it was decided that the American occupation army should also present a more serious side of American culture. A Seventh Army Symphony was formed, conducted by Corporal Samuel Adler, and concert soloists, like pianist Amo Cappelli and violinist Peter Schaffer were featured. A Seventh Army String Quartet and other chamber music combinations gave frequent concerts. A legitimate theatre unit included director Adrian Hall and actor Philip Bosco.

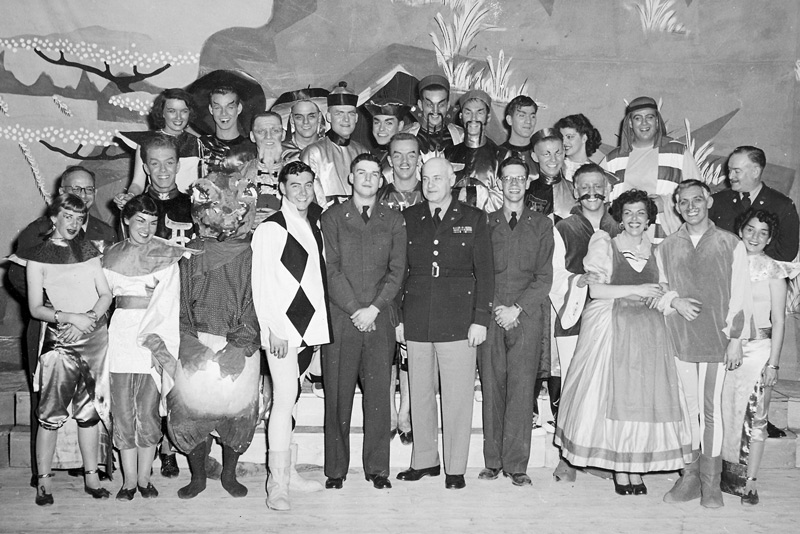
Xanadu - The Marco Polo Musical cast

In 1952 it was determined that Seventh Army should produce an original Broadway-size musical comedy that would tour civilian theatres as well as military bases. Private William Perry, a composer then serving in Berlin, was transferred to Stuttgart and given carte blanche to draw on creative personnel and performers wherever they might be stationed. Perry's long-time collaborator, lyricist William S. Wheeling, then serving in the Air Force, joined the team as did choreographer and Broadway tap dance star Robert Scheerer. Private Johnny Gilbert, who already had established a prominent singing career, was brought in to play the lead.

In the spring of 1953, Xanadu, the story of Marco Polo's epic but entertaining journey to the court of Kublai Khan, was premiered and warmly received. The first extended tour included performances in Vienna, Trieste in Italy, and throughout Germany, often in famous opera houses. A number of the songs became immediately popular through broadcasts on the Armed Forces Network. Later tours included Great Britain and other parts of Europe, and the show was still being performed five years later.

After leaving the service, members of the original company went on to have successful careers in show business. William Perry received Tony nominations for his 1986 musical, The Wind in the Willows, starring Nathan Lane, and his television productions for PBS have received both Emmy and Peabody awards. Robert Scheerer resumed his Broadway career as second lead to Julie Andrews in The Boy Friend and later became a film and television director, three times nominated for Emmy awards. Virginia Boyle, who played the female lead in Xanadu, established a career as a country and western singer and songwriter. Johnny Gilbert became the host or announcer of numerous popular television game shows.

== Scenes and music ==
PROLOGUE: The Mandarin and the Chorus

SCENE ONE: The Pizzeria of Mama Polo in Venice. 1271,

- Pizza, Pizza
- The Sun, the Wind, and the Sea
- Finaletto

SCENE TWO: The Border of China.

- Don't Ride a Camel
- Tea-Time in China

SCENE THREE: The Pleasure Dome of Kublai Khan

- That We Wouldn't Want to Lose
- Kublai Khan
- Here We Are, You Lucky People
- The Legend of the Little Dragon
- Dance in the Streets

SCENE FOUR: The Peacock Garden

- To the Ladies
- The Other Side of the Moon

SCENE FIVE: The Jade Pagoda

- A Quiet Pagoda
- The Right Kind of Man
- Two Little Girls Like You
- The Meeting of the Smoke-Ring

SCENE SIX: The Streets of Xanadu

- Rosalina

SCENE SEVEN: The Pleasure Dome

- Sacrifice Night
- The Rickshaw Reel
- Finale Ultimo
