= Outlaw Queen =

1957 film

- Directed by: Herbert S. Greene
- Written by: Edward D. Wood Jr.
- Produced by: Cy Roth; Ronald V. Ashcroft
- Starring: Andrea King; Harry James; Robert Clarke
- Cinematography: Brydon Baker
- Edited by: Ronald V. Ashcroft
- Music by: Gene Kauer
- Production companies: Ashcroft and Associates
- Distributed by: Globe Releasing Corporation
- Release date: April 28, 1957
- Running time: 70 minutes
- Country: United States
- Language: English

Outlaw Queen is a 1957 American western film directed by Herbert S. Greene and starring Andrea King, Harry James and Robert Clarke.

== Plot ==
Christina, the daughter of Greek immigrants tours the West with her uncle in a sharpshooting act. After losing their earnings one night in a game of poker in Conway's saloon, they win it back again by shouting out their opponents cards in Greek. Christina opens her own rival saloon which is soon a huge success, and before long has built up a business empire including a ranch. Conways's resentment leads him to try and destroy her.

== Cast ==
- Andrea King as Christina
- Harry James as Rick Mason
- Robert Clarke as John Andrews
- James Harakas as Uncle Jim
- Andy Ladas as Andy Trinas
- Kenne Duncan as Sheriff
- I. Stanford Jolley as Conway
- William Murphy as Brandon
- Vince Barnett as Gambler
- Harold Peary as Bartender
- John Heldring as Bank Manager

== Bibliography ==
- Craig, Rob. Ed Wood, Mad Genius: A Critical Study of the Films. McFarland, 2009.
