= Let's Play Post Office =

Game show about delivering mail with obstacles

Let's Play Post Office is an American game show which aired on NBC from September 27, 1965 to July 1, 1966. Don Morrow was the host, with Bill Wendell and Wayne Howell as announcers. Paul Taubman, who had previously worked with Morrow on Camouflage, provided music.

The series aired at 12:30 PM Eastern and was the second game show by Merv Griffin Productions; the first was Jeopardy!, which had premiered on NBC eighteen months earlier (and in fact had moved to noon on the day Post Office debuted, thus becoming the show's lead-in throughout its run). The show was created by Louise Adamo.

== Gameplay ==
Three contestants competed, one usually a returning champion, to identify celebrities from fictitious letters they might have written. Each letter had a predetermined value of $5–$100.

Morrow would read the letter's postmark, with an openiing dollar value assessed; then began to read the letter one line at a time; the value of the letter decreased as Morrow continued to read. Contestants would shout out "STOP!" at any point to make a guess, by quickly writing down their answers; with a correct answer winning the value of the letter at the point they stopped the reading to compose their answer. Clues were often puns; for example: "The temperature outside is zero. I mostel you." (Answer: Zero Mostel.)

=== Zip round ===
The final round had five one-line messages, with the contestants trying to identify the name of each "sender" by signalng with a lock-out device. Correct answers added $25, while wrong answers deducted $25.

The high scorer after this round became champion and returned on the following episode.

== Set ==
The set was designed like a small-town post office. The contestant podiums resembled stamp windows, while Morrow's podium resembled a street-corner mailbox and the board looked like a giant envelope.

== Introduction ==
Don Morrow was always introduced as the "postmaster of ceremonies."
