= Supermarket Sweep =

American television game show

- Genre: Game show
- Created by: Al Howard
- Directed by: Lloyd Gross (1965–67); Peter Molnár (1965–67); Chris Darley (1990–95, 2000–03); J. Rupert Thompson (2020–22)
- Presented by: Bill Malone; David Ruprecht; Leslie Jones
- Announcer: Wally King; Richard Hayes; Johnny Gilbert; Randy West; Tahir Moore
- Theme music composer: The Dave Brubeck Quartet (1965–67); Score Productions (1965–67); Christopher Rhyne (1990–95, 2000–03); Hurby Azor (2020–22)
- Opening theme: "Supermarket Sweep Theme" (1965–67, 1990–95, 2000–03); "Push It" by Salt-N-Pepa (2020–22)
- Country of origin: United States
- Original language: English
- No. of seasons: 5 (Lifetime); 3 (PAX); 2 (ABC Primetime)
- No. of episodes: 1,040 (Lifetime/PAX); 650 (Lifetime); 390 (PAX); 23 (ABC Primetime)

Production
- Executive producers: Leonard Stern (1965–67); Al Howard (1990–95, 2000–03); Leslie Jones (2020–22); Hunter Seidman (2020–21); Jennifer Mullin (2020–21); Alycia Rossiter (2020–21); Wes Kauble (2020–21); Vincent Rubino (2021–22); Lenny Marcus (2021–22)
- Producers: Jerome Schnur (1965–67); Joel Stein (1990–95); Mark Maxwell-Smith (2000); Jim Rossi (2001–03); Rosemarie DiSalvo (2020–21); Todd Lepre (2021–22)
- Production locations: Food Fair (1965–67); Hollywood Center Studios; Hollywood, California (1990–95); Santa Clarita Studios; Santa Clarita, California (2000); NBC Studios; Burbank, California (2000–03); Barker Hangar, Santa Monica Airport; Santa Monica, California (2020–22)
- Running time: 22–26 minutes (1965–2003); 42–46 minutes (2020–22)
- Production companies: Talent Associates (1965–67); Al Howard Productions (1990–95, 2000–03); Fremantle (2020–22)

Original release
- Network: ABC
- Release: December 20, 1965 – July 14, 1967
- Network: Lifetime
- Release: February 5, 1990 – June 16, 1995
- Network: PAX
- Release: April 3, 2000 – May 23, 2003
- Network: ABC
- Release: October 18, 2020 – January 30, 2022

Supermarket Sweep is an American television game show. Teams of contestants answer trivia questions before competing in a timed race to gather grocery items from the aisles of a supermarket. The original show was broadcast on ABC from December 20, 1965, to July 14, 1967. Later series aired on Lifetime from February 5, 1990, to June 16, 1995 (with reruns until August 14, 1998, and on PAX from April 5, 1999, to March 31, 2000), and later on PAX from April 3, 2000, to May 23, 2003, with reruns airing until March 26, 2004. Another version of the show aired from October 18, 2020, to January 30, 2022, also on ABC.

The 1960s Supermarket Sweep was broadcast from Food Fair supermarkets, mostly around New York City. For the Lifetime version, a mock supermarket was created at Hollywood Center Studios. It was modeled after a Hughes Family Market (which was later merged into the Ralphs chain in 1998). The PAX version was taped at Santa Clarita Studios in Santa Clarita, California. Beginning on November 20, 2000, the show moved to NBC Studios, with that series' set modeled after a Unified Western Market. The 2020 version was filmed at the Barker Hangar at Santa Monica Airport.

The host for the 1960s version was Bill Malone. The announcers were Wally King from 1965 to 1966 and Richard Hayes from 1966 to 1967. The host for the Lifetime and PAX versions was David Ruprecht. The announcer was Johnny Gilbert from 1990 to 1995 and again from April to June 2000, with Randy West taking over for Gilbert in July 2000 and continuing for the rest of the series. The 2020 version was hosted by Leslie Jones and announced by Tahir Moore.

== Gameplay ==
=== 1965–67 ===
Three teams competed. Each team began with a base time of 1 minute and 30 seconds. In the first round of the game, one contestant from each team was shown a grocery item and asked to guess its retail price. The team who came the closest won the item and an additional 15 seconds were added to their time. Four items were shown.

In the second round of the game, the contestant from each team who did not play the first round went on a shopping spree through the market, using the time accumulated. Bonus items worth $10 to $100 were also spread throughout the store. All teams kept every item they picked up, with the team with the highest total in groceries, bonus prizes and other items winning the right to return to the show and play in the next game. Teams remained on the show until they were defeated or until they reached the winnings cap of $20,000.

=== 1990–2003, 2020–22 ===
Former logo, used during the 2000–03 Pax TV version; it is based on the designs used for the Lifetime version from 1993 to 1995.

The gameplay of the Lifetime/PAX version of Supermarket Sweep consisted of three segments: the question round, the Big Sweep, and the Bonus Sweep. The game was played between three teams of two related individuals, such as a parent and child, spouses, siblings, or best friends, initially called to play by an object they were holding. Three new pairs of contestants appeared in each episode. Some contestants on earlier episodes later appeared in various tournaments.

The 2020 format largely mirrored the format from 1990. Each hour-long episode consisted of two complete games, with three new teams per game.

==== Question rounds ====
Similar to the original version, all three teams started with a base time of one minute and 30 seconds. In 2020, the base time was increased to two minutes. Through a series of three rounds, contestants were asked a series of questions, usually centered around knowledge of products found in a grocery store. Each correct answer added 10 seconds to a team's time bank. The first two question rounds were played by one team member, with team members swapping positions after the first round. Questions included identifying a product that was missing letters, determining the brand of a product via an edited picture, and identifying a product based on a series of facts. Occasionally, questions centered around pop culture, movies, or stories found in checkstand tabloids.

Other questions centered around identifying the price of an item. This was accomplished in several different ways; two popular methods included determining which item in a set of three did not fit the designated criteria (e.g. ± $3), or which item was incorrectly priced. A mainstay in the second round gave contestants the opportunity to add 30 seconds to their time banks if all three contestants gave the correct answer.

Occasionally, the second question round was replaced with one of the following games:

- "30-Second Shootout" – Each team played this round individually. One member was given a list of words and had 30 seconds to get their partner to say as many of them as possible. The first letters of these words spelled out a brand or product name; if the partner could guess it, the team received 30 seconds of Sweep time. If the clue-giver said one of the target words, the team forfeited their turn. A variant of this game required one member to describe three particular brand names for their partner to guess (with their logos shown on-screen), with 10 seconds awarded for each correct solution.
- "Snack Attack Movie Game" – Three questions about movies worth 10 seconds each were asked. The contestant who answered the last of the three questions correctly earned the right to take a taste test of a food item in the market, correctly identifying the item earned that team a $50 bonus for the Big Sweep. If the contestant guessed right on a second chance (multiple choice at that point, and consisting of a maximum three choices), that team earned $25. On some episodes, the question related to the item only had two choices and only the correct choice earned the $50 bonus.

The final round was the "Round Robin" game, in which the members of each team alternated turns buzzing in to answer questions (typically six altogether) that awarded 10 seconds apiece. For the Lifetime and PAX versions, the most common format featured a brand or product name that had its letters scrambled. The emcee would then offer a maximum of three clues to help contestants zero in on the correct answer. On some episodes of the Lifetime version, an alternate format was used that omitted the word scramble; instead, the host would offer five clues. The 2020 version used the same pool of mini-games for the Round Robin as the previous two rounds.

===== Mini-Sweep =====
Beginning in 1991, a Mini-Sweep was played at the beginning of the first round. A toss-up question (usually a rhyming couplet) was asked with a particular product as the answer. The team that correctly answered the question earned 10 seconds, as well as a chance for one team member to run into the market to retrieve a package of that product marked with the show's logo. If the product was returned within 30 seconds, the team won $50 towards their Sweep total. The team won no bonus if the runner failed to find the marked package, returned it after time ran out, or returned an incorrect item or unmarked package. Originally, contestants were only required to bring back any one package of the item in question.

In 1992, the bonus was doubled to $100 if the product was brought back within 20 seconds. In 1993, a second Mini-Sweep was added at the beginning of the second round. This was later discontinued as a regular feature but occasionally was used during special weeks on the PAX version.

In the 2020 version, the Mini-Sweep consisted of a clue read to all three teams. Instead of buzzing-in, the teams discussed the clue and each sent one member into the market to find the correct item. The first person to bring it back won $250 and 10 seconds for their team.

==== Big Sweep ====
The "Big Sweep" was the chance for the teams to run throughout the supermarket and take products from the shelves with the seconds they had earned in the front game. One contestant from each team was designated as the "runner," with the job of collecting items in a shopping cart, and the teams were assigned numbers based on their accumulated time: 1 for the most, 2 for the second-most, 3 for the least.

The clock for the Big Sweep was set to the leading team's time, and it started when Team 1 was sent into the market. Teams 2 and 3 were sent in when the clock displayed their respective times. If any of the teams were tied, they were sent into the market at the same time.

A camera operator would follow each shopper throughout the Big Sweep. In each finished episode, the footage was spliced together to create one near-real-time highlight reel, and the announcer would add a play-by-play commentary to the reel, describing the items being placed in each contestant's cart.

At any time, runners could bring full carts back to their partners' checkout counters and exchange them for empty ones. With the exception of certain bonuses, items had to be in a team's cart (either the runner's current one, or a full one already delivered to the checkout) when time ran out in order to count toward their total.

The three main rules for the Big Sweep were:

- Each runner could take no more than five of any one item.
- If an item was knocked off a shelf or otherwise upset or damaged, the runner who did so either had to replace the item on the shelf, put it in their cart, or take a $25 penalty for each item. Teams were also penalized $100 for running into supermarket displays, cameramen or any other personnel, including opponents.
- Only the runners could be in the market; their partners were required to remain at the checkout counter behind a red restraining line and unload the groceries. The partners could cross the line only with permission from the producers, typically to pick up a dropped item or bonus or to take part in a bonus activity that required their participation.

The five-item limit was absent in the original ABC version of the show, but was added to prevent a team from overloading their carts with expensive items, such as poultry, laundry detergent or over-the-counter drugs.

During most episodes of the first season, costumed characters such as Frankenstein's monster, a gorilla, or a creature named Mr. Yuck ran through the aisles during the Sweep. If the character came near a contestant or vice versa, the contestant had to turn around and go in the other direction. If the contestant's cart hit the character, a penalty was also imposed. The characters were later dropped.

A variety of opportunities to earn additional cash were available during the Big Sweep. The one constant throughout the entire run of the second series was a group of giant "bonus" items (these included stuffed animals, advertising signs and inflatable displays of products) placed throughout the market in plain sight. Attached to each of these items was a peel-off sticker that concealed a value of either $50, $100 or $200. In 1993, a fourth bonus value ($250, dubbed the "Super Bonus") was added. Episodes of the Twin Car Giveaway tournament that took place in 1994 had a $300 bonus (dubbed the "Super Super Bonus"), replacing the $50 bonus. Each runner could take only one bonus, and its value was added to the team's total only if it was returned to the checkout counter before time ran out.

Later in the Lifetime series, Supermarket Sweep began employing more ways for the teams to build up their sweep totals. The first such method employed was called the Shopping List, where teams could earn an extra $250 for bringing three (originally four) specific grocery items back during the course of the Big Sweep ($500 in the 2020 version). Over the years, more variations on that theme would be used; for instance, the teams might be asked to fulfill a bread order or retrieve magazines.

Other ways for teams to earn money included:

- Searching through a bin of canned goods to find a marked can of a specific brand, or a cart of random products to find a red-tagged product, announced by Ruprecht during the Big Sweep
- Finding a mystery product or movie, with the help of clues given by Ruprecht or a set of monitors in the aisles
- Retrieving a bag of empty cans for the partner to stack or crush
- Grinding a bag of coffee beans
- Weighing and bagging $1 worth of self-serve candy, as shown on a digital scale, with a 2-cent margin of error
- Making a sandwich using every ingredient on a table
- Finding a token by popping balloons or emptying bags of popcorn
- Finding a cash envelope next to a specific product or attached to the back of a movie in the market, with the help of a clue announced by Ruprecht during the Big Sweep

The following bonuses were introduced in the 2020 version:

- Requesting an item from a staff member or placing an order, then waiting for it to be delivered or prepared
- Finding a "golden can" in a specified aisle announced on the loudspeaker
- Finding a cup tagged with the contestant's name at the in-store coffee bar
- A "Triple Bonus" item with three stickers concealing values of $100, $200, and $300; a team claiming this item could peel off one sticker at the end of the Big Sweep and receive its value

Teams received money for these tasks only if they were completed in the manner specified by the host before time ran out.

Once time expired, the runners had to stop whatever they were doing and return to the checkout counters. All of the products were scanned while the show took a final commercial break, and the grand totals of each team's takes were revealed when the show returned, beginning with Team 3, and ending with Team 1. Each team's groceries were tallied and any bonuses/penalties were applied to determine the final totals. The team with the highest score won their Big Sweep total in cash and advanced to the Bonus Sweep for a chance to win an additional $5,000. The other teams received parting gifts. Sweep totals included cents in the first season, but were subsequently rounded to the nearest dollar, with cents only used to break ties.

==== Bonus Sweep / Super Sweep ====
During Ruprecht's tenure as host, the bonus round was called the "Bonus Sweep." The winning team had 60 seconds to win $5,000 by finding three particular items in succession. Before the Bonus Sweep started, the winning team picked one of 3 envelopes. Ruprecht read a clue to lead the team to the identity of the first item, and the clock started immediately afterward as the team ran into the market. The correct item was tagged with a large circular token bearing the show's logo and a clue for a second item to be found. This item in turn had a clue for a third item, which had a bundle of $5,000 in cash hidden behind it. In order to win, the team had to find all three items and have their hands on the money before time ran out. If they fell short, they received $200 for each item they had found. During the closing credits, Ruprecht would show the team where the item was if they failed to find it.

Originally, if the team found the final product and the $5,000 before either of the other two, they automatically forfeited the bonus round. However, starting in 1991, this was changed so that an overhead announcement was made reminding the team to find the first two products, then return to the third product and claim the cash. On at least one episode when the overhead announcement was made, the team still found the final product before finding the second item and the team only received credit for the first item.

The first prize other than $5,000 offered on the show was a trip to Paris, given out as part of "Gourmet Week" in 1992. During the Twin Car Giveaway Tournament, rather than $5,000, the prize, as indicated by the tournament's name, was a pair of Geo Tracker mini SUVs worth over $25,000. During the PAX run, cruises would occasionally be awarded. Bonus rounds were not played in those shows, rather, the players' totals would be collected for the first three weeks of the tournament, and during the fourth week, the three teams with the highest amount would compete again, and at the end of the fourth week, the team with the highest total at the end of that show would win the prize offered as well as all of the cash they had amassed during their time on the show.

The bonus round was retitled the "Super Sweep" in 2020. The initial rules and time limit were the same as for the Bonus Sweep, but the prize for finding all three items was $25,000. Instead of a bundle of cash, the third item had a sealed envelope hidden behind it. The team had to decide whether to "cash out," ending the round and keeping the $25,000, or trade it for an additional 20 seconds on the clock to find a fourth item worth $50,000 and tagged with another envelope. If successful, they could either cash out or trade the money for another 15 seconds to find a fifth and final item, worth $100,000 and tagged with an oversized gold bill in that amount. If the team chose to continue the round after finding the third or fourth item, the clock restarted as soon as they opened the envelope containing the next clue. If time ran out at any point, the team won nothing beyond their Big Sweep total.

From 2021 to 2022, the team was given 90 seconds to find five items, each of which increased their Bonus Sweep winnings if found ($5,000, $10,000, $25,000, $50,000, and $100,000). If time ran out, the team won the money for the last item found in addition to their Big Sweep total.

== Revival ==
On October 13, 2017, it was announced that Fremantle had acquired the global rights to the format and that a new version of the show was in the works. Fremantle stated that the new incarnation of the show would incorporate "modern technology" into the program to reflect 21st-century shopping habits. On August 27, 2019, Deadline reported that Leslie Jones had signed on as host and executive producer. Several networks, including ABC, NBC, and Fox, as well as Netflix, were said to be interested in acquiring the series. On January 8, 2020, Deadline confirmed that ABC had picked up the series, with Jones as host. On June 17, 2020, it was announced that the series would premiere on October 18, 2020, and air on Sundays at 8:00 p.m. On May 13, 2021, the series was renewed for a second season, which premiered on September 26, 2021. In May 2022, ABC shelved the series indefinitely.

== Episode status ==
Currently, episodes from the Lifetime and PAX versions air on Buzzr since January 15, 2018. In addition, a 24-hour channel, featuring various episodes from the Lifetime revival and PAX revival, is available on free ad-supported streaming television services such as The Roku Channel and Pluto TV. An official YouTube channel also uploads clips and full episodes of both the Lifetime and PAX versions on a regular basis.

== Merchandise ==
A board game based on the original ABC version was manufactured by Milton Bradley in 1966. Another board game, based on the 2020 version, was manufactured by Imagination Gaming. A video slot machine was released in 2005 by WMS Gaming.

== See also ==
- Cash and Carry
- Shop 'til You Drop
- Supermarket Street Sweep
