= Supermarket Street Sweep =

Charity bicycle race in San Francisco, California

Supermarket Street Sweep is an annual charity bicycle race held in San Francisco, California. The race benefits the San Francisco Food Bank by tasking racers to collect both food and financial donations. The race is an Alleycat-style race that features specific tasks and checkpoints along the route for racers to complete.

== History ==
The Supermarket Street Sweep, or "SMSW", was organized in 2006 by an all-volunteer group of friends headed by Jenny Oh Hatfield. Inspired by the Cranksgiving Race in New York City - where she had lived for 13 years - Jenny spearheaded the effort to launch the Bay Area's version of a charity bicycle race that benefitted families in need. The name of the event is a comic reference to the former television game show, Supermarket Sweep.

The SMSW has established itself with an annual presence in the city of San Francisco with racers coming from all parts of California to participate. It has made a positive impact on the city's public battle with hunger and homelessness. Additionally, the 2010 event introduced a fund raising program for those unable to participate in the actual race (see categories below). The SMSW is a San Francisco Food Bank-sanctioned event that is often mentioned in its press releases, upcoming events and used as an example of how local action can result in a positive impact on poverty.

== Rules and categories ==
Each year, racers congregate at noon at the "Bow and Arrow", or the Cupid's Span sculpture located in Rincon Park along the Embarcadero.

Racers are given "manifests" - a list of checkpoints - that they must visit in order to complete the race. The checkpoints are supermarkets located in the city and are kept secret until minutes before the start of the race.

There are two types of categories in the Supermarket Street Sweep: Speed and Cargo.

=== Speed Race ===
With the Speed Race, competitors must visit 5 supermarkets that are listed on the manifest and bring back specific items that are required from each location. The top prizes in the Speed Race are awarded to the first individuals who return to the finish with all of the required items from every location in the shortest amount of time. Both road bikes and single-speed / fixed gears qualify for prizes. The top placings are 1st Male (Road Bike); 1st Female (Road Bike); 1st Male (Fixed Gear / SS); 1st Female (Fixed Gear / SS).

In 2012, this format was amended and incorporated a points strategy to the race. Fixed-gear categories were also eliminated in 2011 and prizes are now based on gender and not bicycle type.

=== Cargo Race ===
The Cargo Race also requires racers with cargo-style bikes or bikes that can carry heavy loads to visit 5 supermarkets with a mandatory shopping list, but racers are encouraged to bring back as much additional food as possible for bonus points. The top prizes in the Cargo Race are awarded to the first man and woman who return with the most food. In 2006–2008, this was determined by the number of items brought back. Some food items were worth more bonus points. in 2009 and 2010, the winning totals were determined by overall weight. In 2009, there were additional categories for prizes based on the type of bike you rode and whether you pulled a trailer.

No perishables or any food packaged in glass are allowed for either category. Racers must also bring back receipts for the items listed on the manifest as proof of purchase.

=== Fundraising Category ===
In 2010, a new Fundraising category was introduced through a partnership with Firstgiving.com, where individuals :could solicit financial donations that would directly go to the San Francisco Food Bank.

== Results ==
The 1st annual SMSW, held in 2006, debuted with 80 racers bringing in 1,172 lbs of food. That year also had a "turkey ham" category, the only time perishable food was allowed to be brought in by racers. The finish and after party was located at the Gestalt Bar on 16th Street in the Mission District of San Francisco.

In 2007, the 2nd annual SMSW had an increase in attendance, with 110 racers bringing in 1,595 lbs of food. The finish and after party was also located at the Gestalt Bar that year.

150 racers brought in a 5,266 lbs of food at the 3rd annual SMSW in 2008. The finish and after party was located at Rickshaw Bagworks, a local bag manufacturing company in the Dogpatch neighborhood of San Francisco.

The 4th annual SMSW held in 2009 attracted 198 bicycle racers, who brought in 7,507 pounds (3,405 kg) of food. The winner of the cargo race, Jeremiah Ducate, single-handedly pedaled in 962 pounds (436 kg) of food. The finish was moved to the San Francisco Food Bank, and the after-party was held at the Bryant Street location of the Sports Basement, a local sporting goods store.

The 5th annual SMSW, held December 4, 2010, raised over 6,920 pounds (3,140 kg) of food and a total of 4,877 dollars, 98% of its goal.

In 2011, 201 racers brought in 7,990 pounds (3,620 kg) of food and raised $9,552 for the 6th annual SMSW. The after-parties were held at rideSFO / Sandbox headquarters in Potrero Hill.

A rainy 2012 saw 119 racers bring in an all-time high of 6,552 pounds (2,972 kg) of food and $6,606

For the 8th annual SMS 149 Racers brought in 10,615 pounds (4,815 kg) of food and raised $14,222.

== Sponsors ==
Over the years, the SMSW race has attracted both high profile and local sponsors from both the Cycling and Non-Cycling World. These companies donate all the prizes for the race to act as incentives for the racers. Some of these sponsors include larger corporations like flickr, RVCA, The North Face, cycling companies such as Phil Wood, Thomson, White Industries and Cane Creek. Smaller local companies such as De La Paz Coffee, Rickshaw Bagworks and Sheila Moon clothing have also donated prizes as well as local artists such as Mike Giant who donates limited edition artwork. In 2010, the sponsor list included over 50 supporters.
