= Beat the Odds =

- Created by: Bill Derman
- Presented by: Mike Stokey; Dennis James; Johnny Gilbert
- Announcer: Stan Chambers; Bill Baldwin
- Country of origin: United States

Production
- Producer: Alan Neuman
- Running time: 22 minutes
- Production company: Bill Derman Productions for Bing Crosby Productions

Original release
- Network: KTLA; Syndicated
- Release: July 17, 1961 – September 1969

Beat the Odds is an American game show created by Bill Derman for Bing Crosby Productions.

It first aired as a local production on KTLA in Los Angeles, California in 1961 with Mike Stokey as host and Stan Chambers as announcer. Dennis James succeeded Stokey as host in 1962, and the last episode aired in August 1963. The format was revived for syndication, debuting nationally on December 16, 1968 with Johnny Gilbert as host and Bill Baldwin as announcer. This version of the show lasted until September 1969.

In the show, contestants competed to form words after being given the first letter, last letter, and number of overall letters. For example, if the letters revealed on the two side by side windows on the game board were G and E, and the indicator called for a word of 5 or more letters, "garage" would be an acceptable answer. If a face belonging to a character called "The Whammy" appeared in a window, a player lost their turn. Each correct word won 10 points, with 100 points winning the game. ("The Whammy" was revived in modified form for Carruthers' Press Your Luck in the 1980s.)

Bill Carruthers attempted to revive the format for ABC in 1975, filming a pilot with Chuck Henry as host. This pilot did not sell. The "Whammy" was represented as a blue lightning bolt.
