= Pantomime Quiz =

American television game show

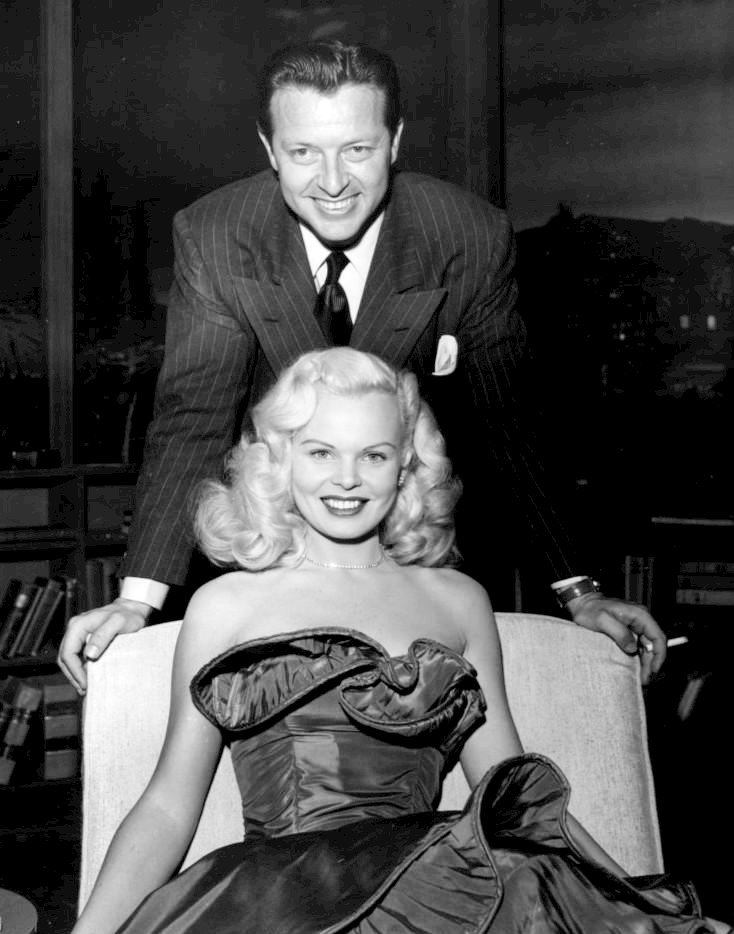
- Mike Stokey and timekeeper Sandra Spence in 1952
- Also known as: Pantomime Quiz Time
- Presented by: Mike Stokey
- Country of origin: United States

Production
- Running time: 24–26 minutes
- Production company: Mike Stokey Productions

Original release
- Network: KTLA (1947–1949); CBS (1949–1957); NBC (January–March 1952); Dumont (1953–1954); ABC (1955; 1958–1959)
- Release: November 13, 1947 – October 9, 1959

Pantomime Quiz, initially titled Pantomime Quiz Time and later Stump the Stars, is an American television game show produced and hosted by Mike Stokey. Running from 1947 to 1959, it was one of the few television series – along with The Arthur Murray Party, Down You Go, The Ernie Kovacs Show, The Original Amateur Hour, and Tom Corbett, Space Cadet – to air on all four TV networks in the United States during the Golden Age of Television.

== Overview ==
Based on the parlor game of Charades, Pantomime Quiz was first broadcast locally in Los Angeles from November 13, 1947, to 1949. In that format, it won an Emmy Award for "Most Popular Television Program" at the first Emmy Awards ceremony. The competition involved two teams of four contestants each (three regulars and one guest). In each round, one member acted out (in mime) a phrase or a name while the other three tried to guess it. Each team had five rounds (in some broadcasts there were only four); the team that took the least amount of time to guess all phrases won the game.

Home viewers were invited to send in phrase suggestions to be used in a telecast. Those, whose phrases were used earned a cash prize or a gift for participating. A bonus was awarded if the team failed to solve the phrase within two minutes.

== Broadcast history (national) ==
In June 1949, Pantomime Quiz became the "first locally [Hollywood]-originated show to be aired in New York via kine recordings." Beginning in early September, the WCBS-TV broadcasts were sponsored by Chevrolet dealers at a cost of approximately $1,200 weekly".

The program was picked up by CBS Television in October 1949 and ran on that network, usually during the summers, until August 28, 1951. After this, NBC Television aired the series as a mid-season replacement from January 2 to March 26, 1952. CBS then took back the series from July 4 to August 28, 1952. NBC never aired the program again. Reruns of the show, with the title Hollywood Guess Stars, began on WPIX in New York City on November 20, 1952.

The DuMont Television Network took the series from October 20, 1953, to April 13, 1954, after which it went back to CBS from July 9 to August 27, 1954.

ABC also picked up the series for a mid-season run, broadcasting it from January 22 to March 6, 1955. After CBS took it back. they aired it for three more summers (July 8 to September 30, 1955; July 6 to September 7, 1956; July 5 to September 6, 1957) before the network dropped the program altogether.

After a seven-month absence, ABC picked up Pantomime Quiz from April 8, 1958, to September 2, 1958; on May 18, 1959, the show began airing on ABC in daytime and concurrently with a primetime show beginning on June 8. However, September 28 saw the end of the primetime version, with the daytime version ending October 9, 1959.

An Australian version aired in 1957 on Melbourne's GTV-9 and Sydney's ATN-7, featuring Harry Dearth, George Foster and Jim Russell among those appearing, but proved to be short-lived, running from March to November.

== Revivals ==
Stump the Stars
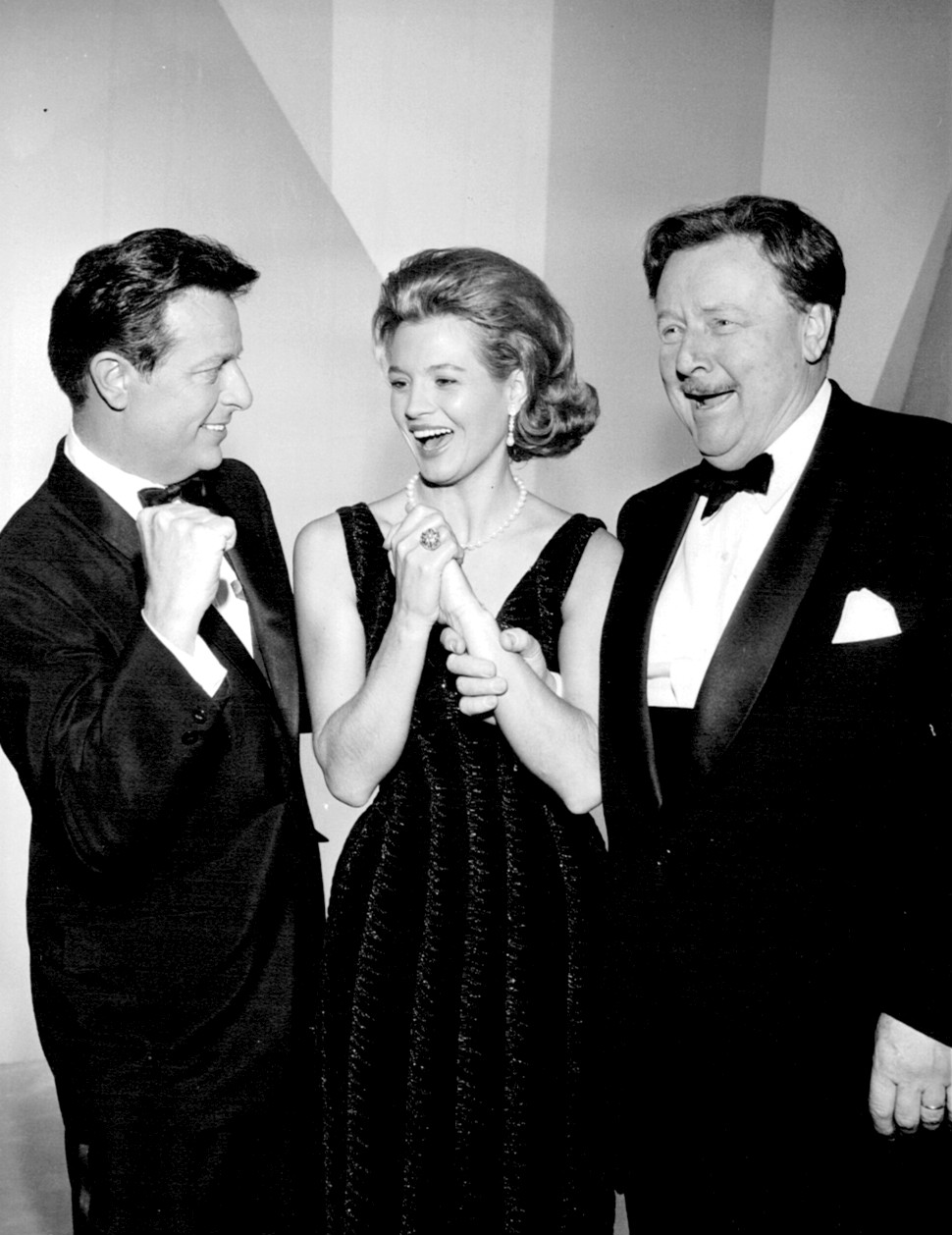
- Host Mike Stokey welcomes celebrity guests Angie Dickinson and Walter Slezak, 1963
- Also known as: Mike Stokey's Stump the Stars
- Presented by: Pat Harrington, Jr. Mike Stokey
- Country of origin: United States

Production
- Running time: 22–24 minutes
- Production company: Mike Stokey Productions

Original release
- Network: CBS (1962–1963); Syndication (1964/1969–1970)
- Release: September 17, 1962 – September 25, 1970

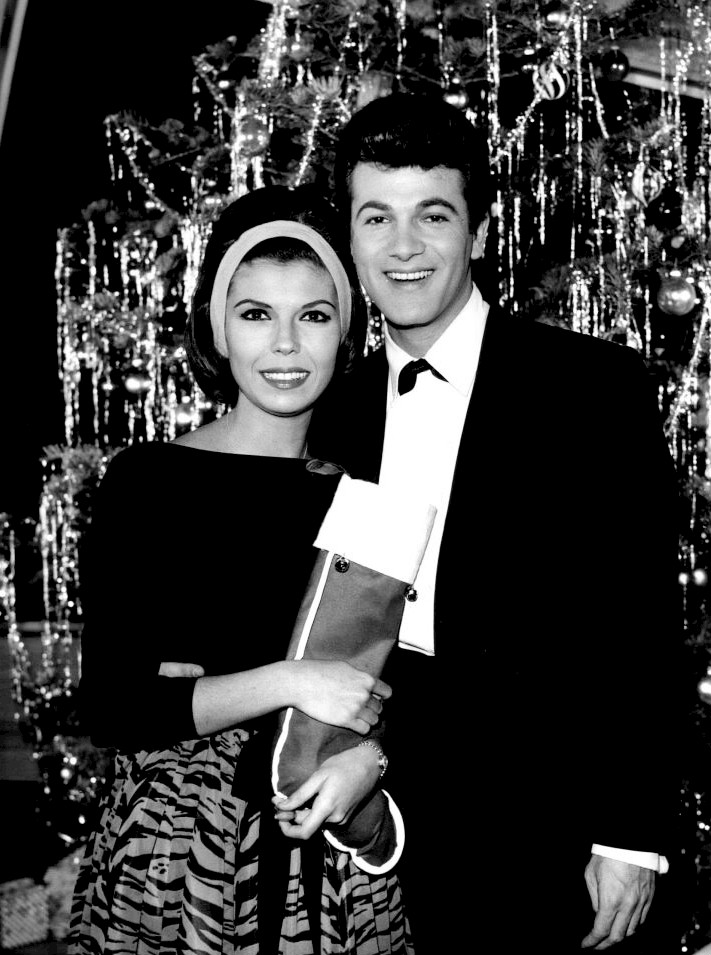
Nancy Sinatra and Tommy Sands on Stump the Stars (1962)

On September 17, 1962, Pantomime Quiz returned to the air as Stump the Stars on CBS with Pat Harrington, Jr. as the emcee. Stokey replaced Harrington on December 17 and continued as both host and producer until the September 16, 1963, finale.

Soon after, Stokey began recording a new syndicated version which ran from February 24 to September 2, 1964. It returned five years later (September 8, 1969) as Mike Stokey's Stump the Stars. As the title suggests, Stokey returned once again to host.

=== Celebrity Charades ===
January 1979 brought another syndicated revival with a few tweaks and a new name - Celebrity Charades. Jay Johnson was the host; This version aired until September. The first three episodes reran on GSN in the 1990s.

On June 20, 2005, AMC revived the series, which was presented by Hilary Swank and her then-husband Chad Lowe. Swank, Lowe, and director Bob Balaban were the producers - although only Lowe hosted. In this version each team had its own room in which to compete. One player from each team is sent to midstage (actually the middle of a New York City loft apartment) to retrieve a phrase to be acted out in his/her team's room. When the team guesses the phrase correctly, the person making correct guess is sent out to midstage for another clue, and so forth until five phrases are guessed. The first team that guesses the phrases' common theme wins the game. However, this version did worse than any of the ones before it, running for a mere five episodes until the experiment ended on June 24.

== Celebrity guests ==
Some of the "stars" who were "stumped" on Pantomime Quiz or Stump the Stars:

- Nick Adams
- Anna Maria Alberghetti
- Morey Amsterdam
- Lucie Arnaz
- Orson Bean
- Ed Begley
- Zina Bethune
- Janet Blair
- Amanda Blake
- Carol Burnett
- Raymond Burr
- Sebastian Cabot
- Roger C. Carmel
- Dane Clark
- Robert Clary
- Jan Clayton
- Hans Conried
- Jackie Coogan
- Jeanne Crain
- Robert Culp
- Dan Dailey
- Sammy Davis Jr.
- Yvonne De Carlo
- Angie Dickinson
- Peter Donald
- Diana Dors
- Nanette Fabray
- Nina Foch
- John Forsythe
- Beverly Garland
- Alice Ghostley
- Frank Gorshin
- Rocky Graziano
- James Gregory
- Merv Griffin
- Barbara Hale
- Ty Hardin
- Dorothy Hart
- William Hopper
- Robert Horton
- Tab Hunter
- Adele Jergens
- Stubby Kaye
- Milt Kamen
- Eartha Kitt
- Bert Lahr
- Hedy Lamarr
- Michael Landon
- Angela Lansbury
- Gypsy Rose Lee
- Ruta Lee
- Jerry Lewis
- Art Linkletter
- Richard Long
- Deanna Lund
- Carol Lynley
- Gisele MacKenzie
- Gordon MacRae
- Sheila MacRae
- Jayne Mansfield
- Rose Marie
- E. G. Marshall
- Ross Martin
- Lee Marvin
- Roddy McDowall
- Vera Miles
- Mary Tyler Moore
- Terry Moore
- Howard Morris
- Don Murray
- Tommy Noonan
- George O'Brien
- Dick Patterson
- Tom Poston
- Mala Powers
- Paula Prentiss
- Vincent Price
- Robert Reed
- Mickey Rooney
- Maxie Rosenbloom
- Jane Russell
- Tommy Sands
- Lizabeth Scott
- Martha Scott
- William Shatner
- Allan Sherman
- Nancy Sinatra
- Connie Stevens
- Elaine Stritch
- William Talman
- Karen Valentine
- Dick Van Dyke
- Elena Verdugo
- Clint Walker
- Ruth Warrick
- Grant Williams
- Alan Young

== Episode status ==
Many episodes of Stump the Stars and Pantomime Quiz exist, and are held by the UCLA Film and Television Archive.

A few episodes that appear to be public domain have been available on the private trading circuit; and also appear on YouTube.

== See also ==
- Party Game—Canadian game show similar to Pantomime Quiz
- List of programs broadcast by the DuMont Television Network
- List of surviving DuMont Television Network broadcasts
- Hollywood Game Night

== Bibliography ==
- David Weinstein, The Forgotten Network: DuMont and the Birth of American Television (Philadelphia: Temple University Press, 2004) ISBN 1-59213-245-6
- Alex McNeil, Total Television, Fourth edition (New York: Penguin Books, 1980) ISBN 0-14-024916-8
- Tim Brooks and Earle Marsh, The Complete Directory to Prime Time Network TV Shows, Third edition (New York: Ballantine Books, 1964) ISBN 0-345-31864-1
