= Not for Hire (TV series) =

American TV crime drama (1959–1960)

- Starring: Ralph Meeker; Ken Drake; Norman Alden; Stanley Adams; Jack Reitzen
- Country of origin: United States
- Original language: English
- No. of seasons: 1
- No. of episodes: 39

Production
- Running time: 30 minutes
- Production company: California National Productions

Original release
- Network: Syndication
- Release: October 23, 1959 – July 15, 1960

Not for Hire is an American television crime drama series starring Ralph Meeker as an army investigator.

== Overview ==
Ralph Meeker portrayed U.S. Army Sgt. Steve Dekker, a criminal investigator for the United States Army who was based in Hawaii. Recurring actors included Ken Drake, Norman Alden and Stanley Adams and Jack Reitzen. Others featured on the show were Robert Anderson, George Barrows, Arthur Batanides, Herb Ellis, Sam Gilman, Arthur Hanson, Anne Helm, Robert 'Buzz' Henry, Jess Kirkpatrick, Lou Krugman, Karl Lukas, Neyle Morrow, James Parnell, Michael Pataki, Richard Reeves, Charles Wagenheim, Patrick Waltz and Arch Whiting. John Florea was the producer and director.

== Episodes ==
No.	Title	Directed by	Written by	Original release date
1	"The Soldier's Story"	Unknown	Tony Barrett & John Florea	October 23, 1959
2	"The Hunting License"	Unknown	Frank Waldman & Richard Donovan	October 30, 1959
3	"Personal Disappearance"	Unknown	Donald A. Brinkley	November 6, 1959
4	"The Fall Guy"	John Florea	Story by : Jack Jacobs; Teleplay by : Jack Jacobs & Martin Goldsmith	November 13, 1959
5	"Smuggled Wife"	William Bennington	Don Brinkley	November 20, 1959
6	"The Deserter"	Unknown	Unknown	November 27, 1959
7	"One Quart of Sorrow"	Unknown	John Hawkins	December 4, 1959
8	"The Frame"	Unknown	Unknown	December 11, 1959
9	"The Fickle Fingers"	John Florea	John Hawkins	December 18, 1959
10	"Death Loses Face"	Unknown	Jack Laird	December 25, 1959
11	"Shark Bait"	Unknown	Story by : P.K. Palmer; Teleplay by : Richard Collins	January 1, 1960
12	"Ten Round Kill"	Unknown	Tony Barrett	January 8, 1960
13	"Guns for the Revolution"	Unknown	Lee Karson	January 15, 1960
14	"A Matter of Courage"	Unknown	Ed Adamson	January 22, 1960
15	"Carrier Pigeon"	Unknown	Donald A. Brinkley	January 29, 1960
16	"Big Man"	Unknown	Unknown	February 5, 1960
17	"Careless Love"	Unknown	Unknown	February 12, 1960
18	"The Set Up"	Unknown	Unknown	February 19, 1960
19	"The Basic Rumble"	Unknown	Story by : Edward W. Walsh; Teleplay by : Donald A. Brinkley	February 26, 1960
20	"One of Our Russians Is Missing"	Unknown	Unknown	March 4, 1960
21	"The Roll"	Unknown	Unknown	March 11, 1960
22	"The Needle"	Unknown	Stephen Kandel	March 18, 1960
23	"Murder in Quiet Town"	Unknown	Unknown	March 25, 1960
24	"Battle Scar"	Unknown	Rudy Makoul & Joel Rogosin	April 1, 1960
25	"The Survivor"	Unknown	Unknown	April 8, 1960
26	"Main Event"	Unknown	Unknown	April 15, 1960
27	"Line of Duty"	Unknown	Unknown	April 22, 1960
28	"The Long Dead Blonde"	Unknown	Unknown	April 29, 1960
29	"Sheep's Clothing"	Unknown	Unknown	May 6, 1960
30	"The General's Daughter"	Unknown	Joseph Vogel	May 13, 1960
