= William Murphy (actor) =

American actor

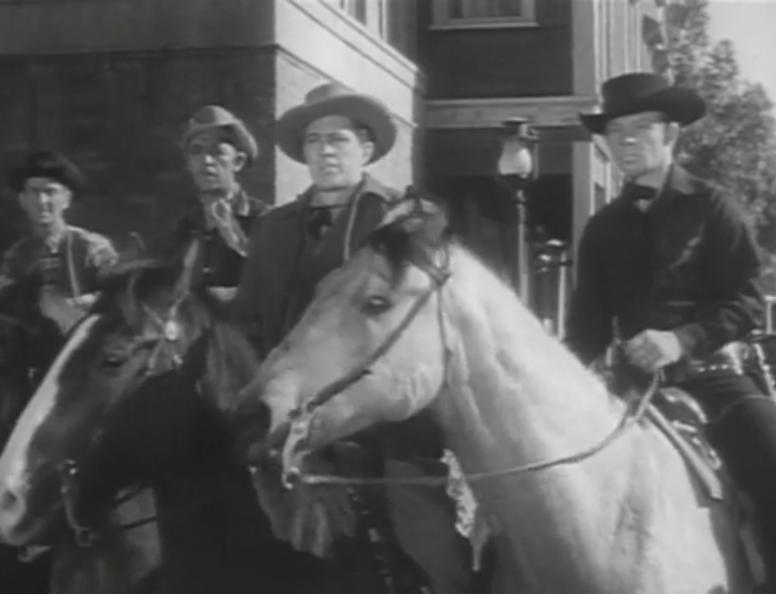
- Murphy (right) with Tex Palmer, Hal Hopper, and Don Haggerty in 26 Men, 1957
- Born: April 20, 1922; Los Angeles, California, U.S.
- Died: November 6, 1989 (aged 67); Los Angeles, California, U.S.
- Other names: Gaines Mors and Red Murphy
- Occupation: Actor
- Years active: 1944–1971
- Children: 6

William Murphy (April 20, 1922 – November 6, 1989) was an American film actor active from the 1940s through the 1970s. He played Lt. Edlridge on Gunsmoke in the 1959 episode "Blue Horse" (S4E38).

A long-time friend of John Wayne and Robert Mitchum, Williams also spent many nights with Elvis Presley and his entourage. He reportedly regarded Hollywood as "an open invitation to party all night long".

== Filmography ==
Year	Title	Role	Notes
1944	Abroad with Two Yanks	Jersey	Uncredited
1944	Something for the Boys	Soldier	Uncredited
1944	Faces in the Fog	Russell	Uncredited
1944	Here Come the Waves	Petty Officer	Uncredited
1945	It's a Pleasure	Canadian Goalie	Uncredited
1945	Salty O'Rourke	Bennie	
1945	Nob Hill	Lucky Sailor at Tony's	Uncredited
1945	The Story of GI Joe	Private Mew	
1945	Jungle Captive	Johnny - Errand Boy	Uncredited
1945	Secrets of a Sorority Girl	Andy Jones	
1945	Duffy's Tavern	Waiter	Uncredited
1945	Doll Face	Sailor	Uncredited
1946	Young Widow	Army Lieutenant Hope	
1946	Till the End of Time	Marine	Uncredited
1947	Kilroy Was Here	Soda Jerk	Uncredited
1947	I Wonder Who's Kissing Her Now	Messenger Boy	Uncredited
1947	The Burning Cross	Minor Role	Uncredited
1947	Unconquered	Villager	Uncredited
1947	On the Old Spanish Trail	Hotel Clerk Mitch	Uncredited
1947	The Prairie	Jess Bush	
1948	A Foreign Affair	Joe	
1948	Family Honeymoon	Boy	Uncredited
1948	Command Decision	Flyer	Uncredited
1948	Jungle Patrol	Lt. Johnny Murphy	
1949	It Happens Every Spring	Tommy Isbell	
1949	I Was a Male War Bride	Staff Sergeant at Troopship	Uncredited
1949	Battleground	Non-Com	
1949	Dear Wife	Dan Collins	
1949	Sands of Iwo Jima	PFC Eddie Flynn	
1950	Kiss Tomorrow Goodbye	Motorcycle Cop	Uncredited
1951	Fighting Coast Guard	Sandy Jessup	
1952	Red Skies of Montana	Winkler	Uncredited
1952	Hoodlum Empire	Pete Dailey	
1953	Fair Wind to Java	Ahab	
1953	The Big Heat	Reds	Uncredited
1955	Six Bridges to Cross	Red Flanagan	
1955	Ain't Misbehavin'	Bucky, a Sailor	Uncredited
1956	Emergency Hospital	Will - Ambulance Attendant	Uncredited
1957	Outlaw Queen	Brandon	
1957	No Down Payment	Ed	Uncredited
1958	The Rawhide Trail	Elbe Rotter	
