= Mike Stokey =

American game show host and producer (1918–2003

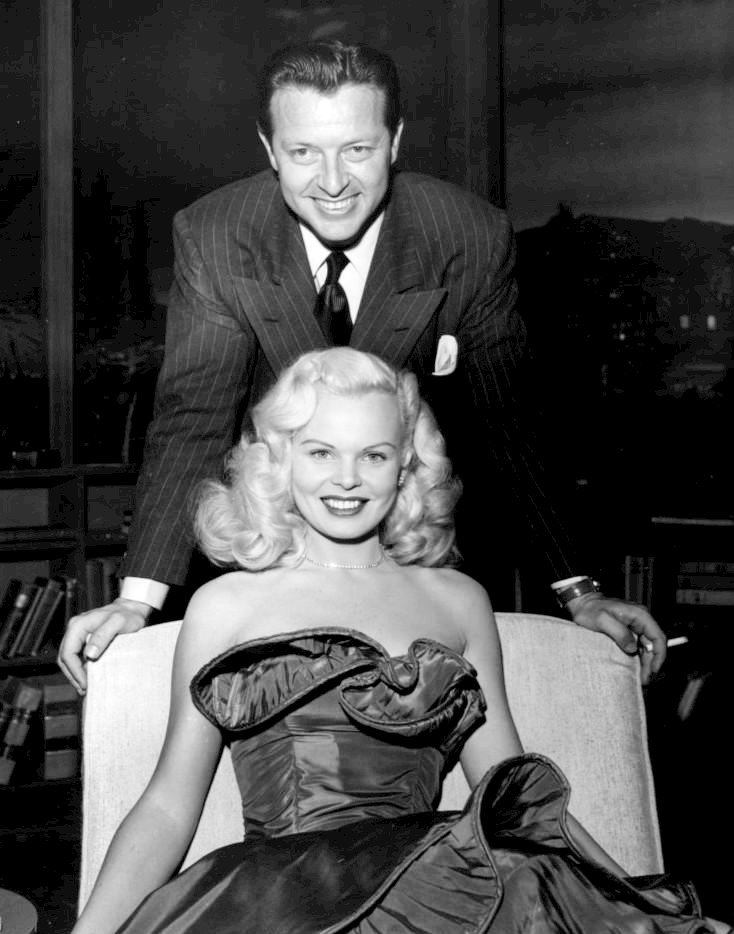
- Stokey and Sandra Spence from Pantomime Quiz, 1952.
- Born: September 14, 1918; Shreveport, Louisiana, U.S.
- Died: September 7, 2003 (aged 84); Las Vegas, Nevada, U.S.
- Occupations: Game show host, producer
- Spouse(s): Pamela Blake (1943–1948); Spring Mitchell (m. 1955)

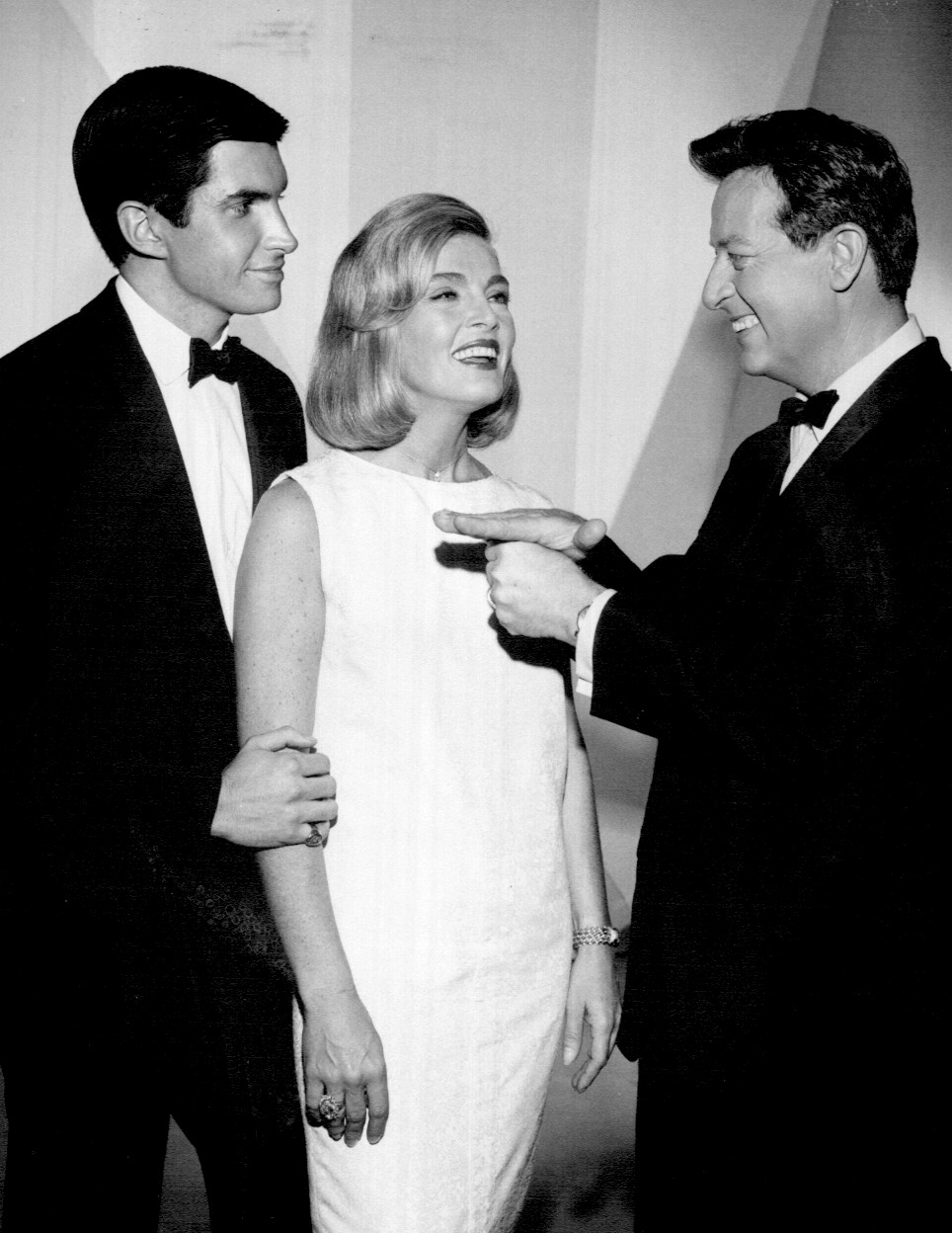
George Hamilton, Lizabeth Scott and Mike Stokey on Stump the Stars (1963)

Mike Stokey (September 14, 1918 – September 7, 2003) was an American television game show host and television producer.

== Career ==
Stokey was known for Pantomime Quiz (1947–1959) and its later incarnation Stump the Stars (1962–1970). He also produced early television specials, including A Christmas Carol in 1949, for the Jerry Fairbanks Company. Stokey also hosted Beat the Odds in 1961 while it was presented at KTLA.

== Personal life ==
His first wife (1943–1948) was actress Pamela Blake, with whom he had one son, Mike Stokey II, and a daughter, Barbara. His second wife was actress Spring Mitchell, born Neola Buxton in Lansing, Michigan, with whom he had daughter, and grandchildren, including Juliette Goglia.

=== Death ===
Stokey died from complications from liver disease on September 7, 2003, aged 84, in Las Vegas.

== See also ==
- List of game show hosts
- List of people from Las Vegas
- List of people from Los Angeles
- List of people from Louisiana
- List of television producers
