= Fast Draw (game show) =

- Presented by: Johnny Gilbert
- Announcer: Fred Scott
- Country of origin: United States

Original release
- Network: Syndication
- Release: May 25, 1968 – April 26, 1969

Fast Draw is a weekly game show hosted by Johnny Gilbert for syndication from May 25, 1968 to April 26, 1969 and was distributed by Warner Brothers/Seven Arts Television. The announcer was "Uncle" Fred Scott.

Taped at the studios of WNEW-TV in New York City, the show involved two teams, each composed of a celebrity and a civilian contestant. The format both predated the board game Pictionary (introduced in 1985) and was the game show predecessor to Win, Lose or Draw (which debuted in 1987).

== Gameplay ==
=== Main game ===
The first round would start with the two civilian contestants standing behind a drawing board that was about waist-high. They would be given 10 seconds each to draw a picture that would allow the celebrities to identify the person, place, thing, or event that was assigned to them. After 10 seconds passed for the first player, the second one would immediately start drawing (accompanied by Gilbert's call to "Draw!") When a celebrity thought he or she knew the identity of the subject, they would hit a buzzer. The contestant would then stop drawing and the celebrity would give his/her guess (usually accompanied with a brief explanation/interpretation of what they saw on the board).

If he or she was right, the team was awarded one point for each second left on the clock (the clock started at 60 seconds). If no one guessed the identity of the subject after 60 seconds, the subject was thrown out and they would start again. There were three rounds in a game; after each round, the celebs and the contestants would switch places. After three rounds, the team with the highest score won the game and got to play the bonus round. In the bonus round, the winning team was given the opportunity to play one final game. The guest star would guess and the contestant would do the drawing. The contestant of the team was awarded $100 for winning the main game.

=== Bonus round ===
In the bonus round, the celebrity had 30 seconds to communicate a "potluck" subject to the contestant (who was not told the category of the subject). The contestant could yell out as many guesses as he or she wanted without having to buzz in or explain it, and if the subject was successfully guessed, he/she was awarded a 13" color television set.
