= Johnny Gilbert =

American game show announcer (born 1928)

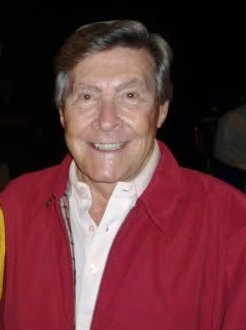
- Gilbert in 2008
- Born: John Lewis Gilbert III; July 13, 1928 (age 98); Newport News, Virginia, U.S.
- Occupation: Game show host/announcer
- Years active: 1952–present
- Known for: Announcer of Jeopardy! (1984–present)
- Spouse: Sharee Gilbert (m. 1984)
- Military career
- Allegiance: United States
- Branch: United States Army
- Units: Seventh Army Special Services

John Lewis Gilbert III (born July 13, 1928) is an American show business personality who has worked mainly on television game shows. Originally a nightclub singer and entertainer, he has hosted and announced a number of game shows from various eras, dating as far back as the 1950s. Gilbert is known primarily for his work as the announcer and audience host for the syndicated version of the quiz show Jeopardy! since its revival in 1984.

== Early life and education ==
John Lewis Gilbert III was born on July 13, 1928, in Newport News, Virginia. He began performing by singing as a boy in his hometown Lutheran Church choir. Although his parents had never worked in the theatrical profession themselves, Gilbert's grandmother had been a church singer.

While he was still in high school, Gilbert decided to take up a professional singing career and learned from an opera teacher. He never sang opera independently, but was the regular vocalist with Shelly Harmon and His Orchestra, a group that toured the Virginia area.

== Career ==
=== Stage and early television career ===
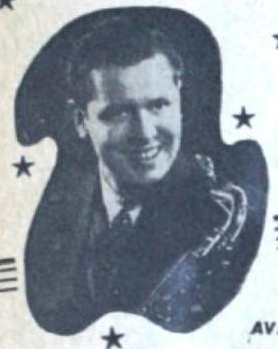
Gilbert in 1945

A few years after graduating from high school, Gilbert resided in Florida for three months working as an emcee, during which he received on-the-job training and learned to walk on stage, speak in front of a public crowd, and tell jokes and stories.

The Dead End Kids, a group comprising young actors such as Leo Gorcey, Huntz Hall, and Gabriel Dell, were organizing a revue. Gilbert joined the group and played throughout the southwestern United States for 16 weeks. When they played in Norfolk, Virginia, Gilbert got special billing.

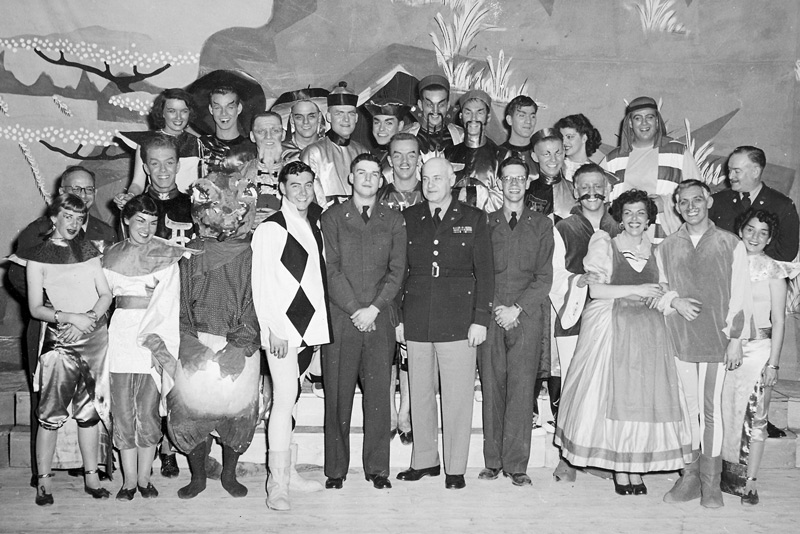
Gilbert (fourth person on the left), with the cast of Xanadu: The Marco Polo Musical in 1953

In the 1950s, Gilbert joined the United States Army's Seventh Army Special Services in Germany, and was cast as the lead in Xanadu: The Marco Polo Musical, an original musical comedy inspired in part by the Samuel Taylor Coleridge poem Kubla Khan, which chronicles Marco Polo's trip to China. The company toured throughout Western Europe, performing for servicemen and civilians alike.

After resigning from the service and returning to the U.S., Gilbert continued singing and hosting in clubs. One day, a manager of a well-known group in Philadelphia asked Gilbert if he was interested in auditioning for television. Gilbert said yes, and received his first television assignment as a singer and emcee on WDSU in New Orleans.

=== Hosting ===
Gilbert went to New York City, where he quickly signed with the William Morris Agency, and received his first job on national television as the host of a newly created game show, Music Bingo, in 1958. The show ran for three years, airing first on NBC and then on ABC. Gilbert's popularity on that show led him to record an album and several singles. Gilbert went on to emcee the local game show Words and Music on KTLA-TV in Los Angeles.

Gilbert was later contacted by Avco Broadcasting to host his own local talk/variety show, The Johnny Gilbert Show, which aired on WLWD-TV (now WDTN) in Dayton, Ohio, and three other Avco stations in Ohio and Indiana. The show was a 90-minute, live telecast running five days a week. It included celebrity guests and a 60-person studio audience. Gilbert hosted it for two years until leaving Dayton on short notice for New York, becoming the host of the Metromedia-produced game show Fast Draw. His slot was then given to Phil Donahue, who at that time was a reporter in WLWD-TV's news department.

After his year-long run on Fast Draw, Gilbert was contacted by Bing Crosby Productions to host the game show Beat the Odds, produced in Los Angeles by Bill Carruthers. After that, he hosted a local, weekday version of Dialing for Dollars on Los Angeles's KCOP-TV.

=== Announcing ===
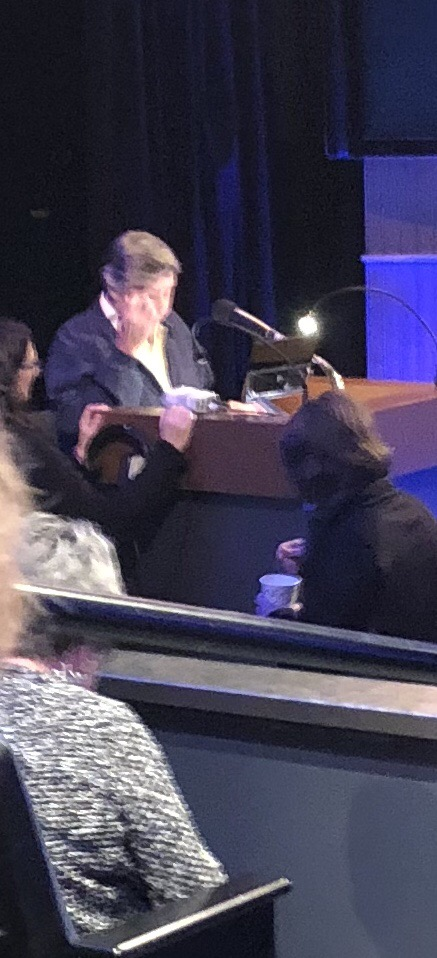
Gilbert announcing Jeopardy! in 2019

In 1963, Gilbert was selected by Mark Goodson to replace Don Pardo as the announcer and audience host for the original Bill Cullen-hosted version of The Price Is Right when it moved from NBC to ABC. He hosted the show for the absent Cullen on June 19, 1964. Gilbert also served as the announcer and audience host for Dinah Shore's syndicated daily talk show, which ran from 1974 to 1980.

When Merv Griffin decided to reintroduce his quiz show Jeopardy! to television in 1984 as a daily syndicated program, the new version's host, Alex Trebek, convinced Griffin to hire Gilbert as announcer and audience host; Trebek had met Gilbert at a dinner party in the early 1980s and was impressed with his voice. Gilbert has held these two roles ever since. He has become well known for opening each of the show's nightly episodes with the announcement, "This is Jeopardy!" After that opening line, Gilbert would introduce the two new challengers for the episode followed by the defending champion, stating the total winnings of the latter, before introducing the host. His additional duties have included announcing the fee plugs for the sponsors of the show (until 1996), announcing consolation prizes offered to non-winning contestants (until 2002), announcing the following day's challengers during the end credits (in 2022 and 2023), and providing information on visiting the Jeopardy! website about streaming the five latest episodes of the current season (since 2025). Also, on some episodes of the first season only, Gilbert would provide voice-overs during lead-ins to and exits from commercial breaks. (Note: Opening narrations and other announcements on the daily syndicated version of Jeopardy! from its premiere on September 10, 1984, through the present.)

In 2017, Gilbert was honored by Guinness World Records for having the longest career as a game show announcer for a single show, after 32 years with Jeopardy! This was commemorated with a rare on-screen appearance by Gilbert just before the Final Jeopardy! segment of the episode aired September 28, 2017 (season #34, show #7599, Austin Rogers's 3rd win). He has also lent his announcements to most of the Jeopardy! video games since 1992, including a few game versions in which he voiced all of the clues and effectively hosted the entire game off-screen instead of Trebek. Gilbert briefly considered retirement after Trebek's death, but chose to continue in the role. In recent years, Gilbert has handled much of his announcer load remotely, with a member of the Clue Crew providing in-studio announcements that are replaced with Gilbert's in post-production. Since the COVID-19 pandemic in 2020, Gilbert began doing his announcements in a studio built for him at his home. From December 19, 2023, to July 25, 2025, he also appeared during the show's opening titles.

Following the death of longtime host Alex Trebek on November 8, 2020, Gilbert stayed as announcer. Gilbert is the last production member of Jeopardy! to remain on the show since its revival began in September 1984.

In addition to announcing for Jeopardy!, Gilbert has worked as a guest announcer on its sister show, Wheel of Fortune. He announced on the episode that aired on April Fools' Day in 1997 (hosted by Trebek), as well as a few weeks worth of episodes in 2010 following the death of the show's longtime announcer, Charlie O'Donnell. Gilbert also guest announced on Wheel in late 1995, when O'Donnell was ill, and on the daytime show in 1988 before the death of then-regular announcer Jack Clark.

Other game shows for which Gilbert has announced over the decades include The $1,000,000 Chance of a Lifetime; The $25,000 Pyramid; The $100,000 Pyramid; Anything for Money; Blackout; Camouflage; Chain Reaction; Dream House; Every Second Counts; Fantasy; Go; Headline Chasers (produced by Griffin); Jackpot; Jeopardy! The Greatest of All Time; The Joker's Wild; Make Me Laugh; Perfect Match; The Quiz Kids Challenge; Sports Challenge; Supermarket Sweep; Tic-Tac-Dough; Win, Lose or Draw; and Yours for a Song. He substituted for Gene Wood on several Goodson-Todman game shows, including Family Feud, the CBS version of Card Sharks, and Child's Play. Gilbert succeeded Rich Jeffries (another part-time substitute for Wood) as permanent announcer of Chuck Woolery's game show Love Connection during the 1988–89 season.

=== Other roles ===
Gilbert's voice was heard on the CBS television special Circus of the Stars, in People's Choice Awards and Emmy Awards ceremonies, and on episodes of the animated series The Angry Beavers and Johnny Bravo. He announced a fictional episode of Jeopardy! in the "Ellen's Energy Adventure" show at EPCOT Center's Universe of Energy attraction, and appeared in a subplot of the 1992 movie White Men Can't Jump in which a character played by Rosie Perez attempts to pass the Jeopardy! audition. Gilbert also lent his voice to an announcer in a 1989 episode of the TV series 227 and announced in The Golden Girls episode "Questions and Answers" (season 7, episode 17, on February 8, 1992) and in the Cheers episode "What Is... Cliff Clavin?" (season 8, episode 14, on January 18, 1990).

== Personal life ==
Gilbert married his wife, Sharee, in 1984.

== Filmography ==
=== Film ===
Year	Title	Role	Notes
1961	Gidget Goes Hawaiian	Johnny Spring	Uncredited
1967	AVCO Hour of Stars	Vocalist	
1979	Rock 'n' Roll High School	Announcer	Uncredited
1992	White Men Can't Jump	Jeopardy! Announcer	Voice
1996	Ellen's Energy Adventure	Jeopardy! Announcer	Voice
2005	Jeopardy! An Inside Look at America's Favorite Quiz Show	Himself	
2018	Game Changers	Himself	TV movie
2020	What is Jeopardy!?: Alex Trebek and America's Most Popular Quiz Show	Himself	

=== Television ===
Year	Title	Role	Notes
1952	Bachelor's Haven	Host	
1958	Music Bingo	Emcee	
1961	Yours for a Song	Announcer	Uncredited
1961–1962	Camouflage	Announcer/Guest Host	4 episodes
1963–1965	The Price Is Right	Announcer/Guest Host	8 episodes
1967	The Bob Braun Show	Himself	1 episode
1968	Fast Draw	Host	1 episode
1968–1969	Beat the Odds	Host	
1969	The Movie Game	Announcer	
1970–1971	Words and Music	Announcer	
1971–1976	Sports Challenge	Announcer	
1972–1973	The Joker's Wild	Guest Announcer	
1975–1976	The Magnificent Marble Machine	Announcer	15 episodes
1977	Hollywood Connection	Announcer	85 episodes
1979	Make Me Laugh	Announcer	
1979	Dinah!	Announcer	1 episode
1980	Chain Reaction	Announcer	71 episodes
1981	The New Tic Tac Dough	Guest Announcer	
1981	Family Feud	Guest Announcer	21 episodes
1982	Child's Play	Announcer	
1982–1991	The $25,000 Pyramid	Announcer	267 episodes
1982–1991	The $100,000 Pyramid	Announcer	107 episodes
1983	Fantasy	Announcer	1 episode
1983–1984	Go	Announcer	40 episodes
1983–1984	Dream House	Announcer	2 episodes
1984	Every Second Counts	Announcer	1 episode
1984	Anything for Money	Announcer	1 episode
1984–present	Jeopardy!	Announcer	>9,272 episodes
1984; 1989	Jackpot	Announcer	
1985–1986	Headline Chasers	Announcer	2 episodes
1985–1988	The $100,000 Pyramid	Announcer	100 episodes
1986	Celebrity Double Talk	Announcer	
1986	$1,000,000 Chance of a Lifetime	Announcer	
1987	Money in the Blank	Announcer	Unsold pilot
1987	Win, Lose, or Draw	Announcer	
1988	Mama's Family	Himself	Episode: "Mama on Jeopardy!"
1988	Blackout	Announcer	55 episodes
1988–1989	Love Connection	Announcer	195 episodes
1989	227	Announcer	Episode: "A Date to Remember"
1990	Cheers	Himself	Episode: "What Is... Cliff Clavin?"
1990	The Finish Line	Announcer	Unsold pilot
1990	Super Jeopardy!	Announcer	13 episodes
1990	The Quiz Kids Challenge	Announcer	
1990–2000	Supermarket Sweep	Announcer	27 episodes
1992	The Golden Girls	Himself	Episode: "Questions and Answers"
1995	Beverly Hills, 90210	Himself	Episode: "Double Jeopardy"
1995–2010	Wheel of Fortune	Guest Announcer	26 episodes
1997	Johnny Bravo	Jackie Jacques	1 episode
1999	The Angry Beavers	TV Host	1 episode
2009	The Florence Henderson Show	Himself	1 episode
2009	The Tonight Show with Conan O'Brien	Announcer in Jeopardy!	1 episode
2020	Jeopardy! The Greatest of All Time	Announcer	4 episodes
2020	Scooby-Doo and Guess Who?	Himself	Episode: "Total Jeopardy"
2022	Jeopardy! National College Championship	Announcer	9 episodes
2022–present	Celebrity Jeopardy!	Announcer	40 episodes
2022–present	Inside Jeopardy!	Guest	6 episodes
2023–present	Jeopardy! Masters	Announcer/Clue Giver	20 episodes
2023–present	This is Jeopardy!: The Story of America's Favorite Quiz Show	Himself	4 episode
2024–present	Pop Culture Jeopardy!	Announcer/Clue Giver	40 episodes
2025	Platonic	Himself	Episode: "Jeopardy"

=== Video games ===
Year	Title	Role	Notes
1998	Jeopardy!	Announcer	Voice
2000	Jeopardy! 2nd Edition	Announcer	Voice
2003	Jeopardy! 2003	Announcer	Voice
2007	Jeopardy! DVD Game	Announcer	Voice
2010	Jeopardy! America's Favorite Quiz Show	Announcer	Voice

== Accolades ==
On September 29, 2022, Gilbert was inducted into the inaugural class of the Jeopardy! Hall of Fame at the 1st Jeopardy! Honors event.
