= Fighting Coast Guard =

1951 film by Joseph Kane

- Theatrical release poster
- Directed by: Joseph Kane
- Screenplay by: Kenneth Gamet
- Story by: Charles Marquis Warren
- Produced by: Joseph Kane
- Starring: Brian Donlevy; Forrest Tucker; Ella Raines; John Russell; Richard Jaeckel; William Murphy; Martin Milner
- Cinematography: Reggie Lanning
- Edited by: Arthur Roberts
- Music by: David Buttolph
- Production company: Republic Pictures
- Distributed by: Republic Pictures
- Release date: May 11, 1951 (New York)
- Running time: 86 minutes
- Country: United States
- Language: English
- Budget: $532,111

Fighting Coast Guard is a 1951 American adventure film directed by Joseph Kane, written by Kenneth Gamet and starring Brian Donlevy, Forrest Tucker and Ella Raines. The film was released on June 1, 1951 by Republic Pictures.

== Plot ==
Shortly before the attack on Pearl Harbor, shipyard foreman Bill Rourk is feuding with coworker and former football star Barney Walker. He is romantically attracted to Louise Ryan, an admiral's daughter working as a wartime welder, but she is dating naval commander Ian McFarland.

McFarland launches an officer-training course after the American entry into World War II. Bill wants to take the course, but his record is tainted by lies told by Walker. He is also caught out after curfew by the military police while trying to romance Louise.

Walker is fatally injured in battle and confesses his lies about Bill before dying. When former shipyard colleague Tony Jessup is stranded and endangered, Bill disobeys orders and heroically tries to save Tony, who dies while being rescued. McFarland commends his bravery and then confides that Louise has fallen in love with Bill.

== Cast ==
- Brian Donlevy as Commander McFarland
- Forrest Tucker as Bill Rourk
- Ella Raines as Louise Ryan
- John Russell as Barney Walker
- Richard Jaeckel as Tony Jessup
- William Murphy as Sandy Jessup
- Martin Milner as Al Prescott
- Steve Brodie as 'Red' Toon
- Hugh O'Brian as Tom Peterson
- Tom Powers as Admiral Ryan
- Jack Pennick as Coast Guardsman
- Olin Howland as Desk Clerk
- Damian O'Flynn as Captain Adair
- Morris Ankrum as Navy Captain
- James Flavin as Commander Rogers
- Roy Roberts as Captain Gibbs
- Sandra Spence as Muriel
- Eric Pedersen as Civilian Wrestler
- Sons of the Pioneers as Musicians

== Reception ==
In a contemporary review for The New York Times, critic Bosley Crowther called the film "an interesting specimen of a picture pitched to the youthful and restless masculine trade" and wrote: "Directed and played in a florid fashion, this story falls flatly in the class of low-grade adventure fiction that makes neither point nor sense."
