= Sandra Spence =

American actress (1925–1974)

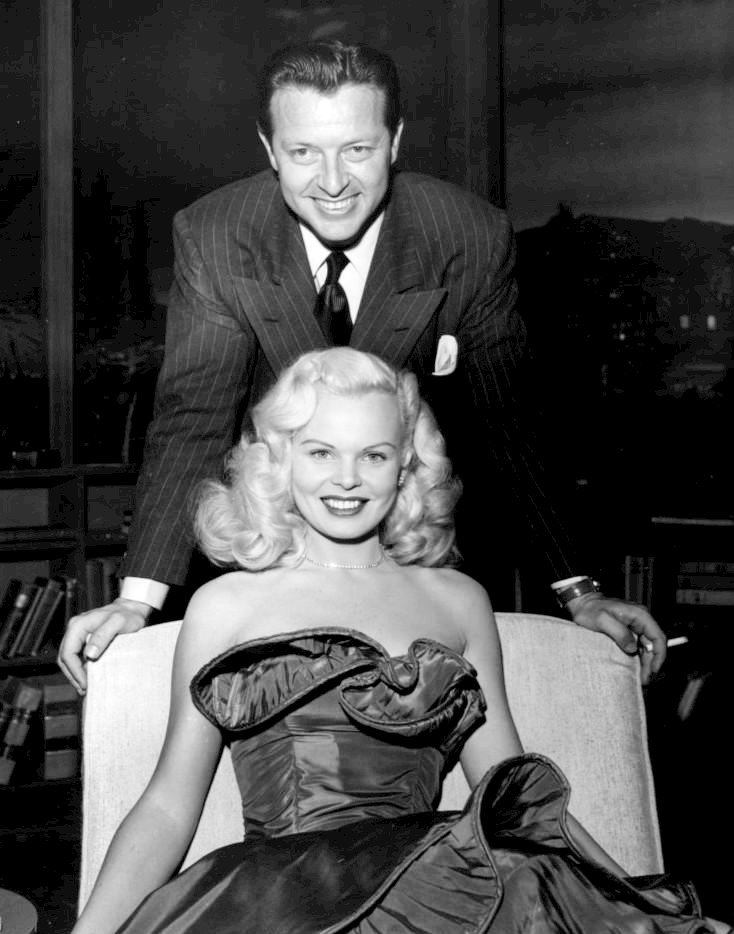
- Spence with Mike Stokey in Pantomime Quiz, 1952
- Born: Nettie Jane Fowler; May 22, 1925; Kelso, Washington, U.S.
- Died: February 13, 1974 (aged 48)
- Occupations: Film and television actress
- Years active: 1948–1957

Nettie Jane Fowler (May 22, 1925 – February 13, 1974) was an American film and television actress. She was known for playing the role of Janet Culver in the first season of the American adventure and drama television series Whirlybirds.

== Early years ==
Spence's parents were Ernest Fowler, who performed in English music halls for two decades, and Nettie Conner, who sang in concerts and operas. She was born in Kelso, Washington.

When Spence was 2 years old she was designated the Most Beautiful Baby in Washington state. When she was 14, she won the Miss Oakland title, and at age 15 she was named Miss San Diego. Producer Earl Carroll selected her for the latter title and had a contract prepared for her to appear in his show. Spence's mother declined the offer, preferring that she continue her education. When Spence was 17 she was runner-up as Miss Stardust, a national competition that included 3,500 contestants. She rejected a proposed screen test, again choosing to remain in school.

== Career ==
After performing with her older sister in vaudeville, Spence began entering beauty contests. She was named Miss Oakland, Miss San Diego, and Miss Stardust, after which Paramount signed her to a one-year contract for film training.

Spence began her screen career in 1948 with an uncredited role of a model in the film If You Knew Susie. Other films Spence appeared in included The Noose Hangs High, Woman of the North Country, Words and Music, Fighting Coast Guard, East Side, West Side, Duchess of Idaho and Annie Get Your Gun. Her final film credit was for the 1955 film Ma and Pa Kettle at Waikiki.

In 1952, Spence appeared in the game show television series Pantomime Quiz, and the following year she appeared in the adventure television series Terry and the Pirates in the role of "Burma". In 1957, Spence joined the cast of the new syndicated adventure and drama television series Whirlybirds, in which she played the role of Janet Culver. She was replaced by actress Nancy Hale, who played the role of Helen Carter after the first season.

Spence performed in repertory theater.

She later worked as an antique dealer.
