= Jeopardy! (franchise) =

Media franchise

- Logo used since 1984
- Created by: Merv Griffin
- Original work: Jeopardy!
- Owners: Sony Pictures; Jeopardy Productions, Inc.
- Years: 1964–present

Print publications
- Books: The Jeopardy! Book (1990); The Jeopardy! Challenge (1992); Jeopardy!: What is Quiz Book 1–4? (2000); This is Jeopardy!: Celebrating America's Favorite Quiz Show (2004)

Films and television
- Film: White Men Can't Jump (1992)^{†}
- Television series: Jeopardy! (various iterations since 1964; current syndicated version since 1984); Jeopardy! (United Kingdom; several iterations since 1983); "What Is... Cliff Clavin?" (1990 episode of Cheers)^{†}; "Miracle on Evergreen Terrace" (1997 episode of The Simpsons)^{†}; Jep! (1998–2000); Rock & Roll Jeopardy! (1998–2001); Sports Jeopardy! (2014–2016); ESPN Jeopardy! (upcoming)

Games
- Traditional: See Board games section
- Video game: See Video games section

Audio
- Original music: "Think!" (theme music)

Miscellaneous
- Theme park attraction: Ellen's Energy Adventure (1996–2017)^{†}
- Educational system: Classroom Jeopardy! (2002–present)
- Genre: Game show

Official website
- Official website
- ^{†} Jeopardy! and its elements (such as its set and host Alex Trebek) were licensed for use in this work.

Jeopardy! is an American media franchise that began with a television quiz show created by Merv Griffin, in which contestants are presented with clues in the form of answers, and must phrase their responses in the form of a question. Over the years, the show has expanded its brand beyond television and been licensed into products of various formats.

== Television ==
Jeopardy! originated as an American television series on March 30, 1964. In its original daytime format, it ran until 1975 on NBC, then was revived by the same network for a 21-week run (with a slightly different format) from 1978 to 1979. Art Fleming hosted the program during its entire run on NBC. The current version of Jeopardy! debuted in first-run syndication in September 1984 with Alex Trebek as the second host, and officially as of December 15, 2023, Ken Jennings as the show's fifth host. It followed the same basic format as the NBC version, with larger prize money and a futuristic set.

With the exception of a 39-episode block of weekly shows placed into syndication near the end of the first NBC run in 1974 and 1975, Jeopardy! has aired its first-run episodes five days a week throughout its existence.

Various international versions have been produced for countries other than the United States. With the exception of the Australian, British, Italian, Japanese, and South Korean versions, all of these began during the current syndicated run in the U.S.

== Books ==
In 1990, host Alex Trebek co-authored The Jeopardy! Book along with Peter Barsocchini, which included boards from some of their past tournament games as well as boards specializing in some of the show's various categories. Also included are behind-the-scenes photos of how the show is produced, including writing the game material. (Trebek also voiced the audiobook, which featured the "behind the scenes" material on tape one, and audio versions of select games from the book on tape two.) Its sequel is The Jeopardy! Challenge, also co-authored by Trebek, along with Griffin, included boards from their past tournament games, and was published in 1992.

In 2000, the show's writers released 4 volumes of quiz books titled Jeopardy!: What is Quiz Book 1–4?, each featuring more than 300 pages worth of Jeopardy! boards from Seasons 14–17.

In 2004, Barnes & Noble published This is Jeopardy!: Celebrating America's Favorite Quiz Show, in honor of the show's 20th anniversary. Written by Ray Richmond, it featured selected Final Jeopardy! answers and questions from each of the show's first 20 seasons, plus trivia and other notable facts about the show. The book was released prior to Ken Jennings' run on the show.

The Jeopardy! Book of Answers was released in 2018 in honor of the show's 35th anniversary. Written by executive producer Harry Friedman, it highlighted the show's premiere (September 10, 1984), Ken Jennings' first and last games (June 2, 2004 and November 30, 2004, respectively), the 2009–2010 Million Dollar Celebrity Invitational finals (May 6–7, 2010), the IBM Challenge (February 14–16, 2011), the Battle of the Decades finals (May 15–16, 2014), the Season 33 College Championship finals (February 23–24, 2017), the Season 33 Teachers Tournament finals (May 18–19, 2017), and the Season 34 Tournament of Champions finals (November 16–17, 2017).

A number of unauthorized books have been published about Jeopardy!, written by people with ties to the show. Inside Jeopardy!: What Really Goes on at TV's Top Quiz Show (1993), written by former Jeopardy! writer and producer Harry Eisenberg, was reissued in 1995 as Jeopardy!: A Revealing Look Inside TV's Top Quiz Show with several allegations of scandal removed. Eisenberg's books contained numerous factual errors and unsubstantiated claims. Secrets of the Jeopardy! Champions (1992), written by Tournament of Champions winners Chuck Forrest and Mark Lowenthal, and How to Get on Jeopardy! and Win! (1998), written by Tournament of Champions winner Michael Dupée, serve as preparation aids for the Jeopardy! contestant hopeful; and Brainiac: Adventures in the Curious, Competitive, Compulsive World of Trivia Buffs (2006), by 74-game winner and later host Ken Jennings and Prisoner of Trebekistan: A Decade in Jeopardy! (2006), written by comedian and former contestant Bob Harris, provide the insights of the extensive Jeopardy! experiences of two other notable champions who subsequently became authors of several books each.

Trebek's autobiography The Answer Is... features the show prominently and draws its name from the show's catchphrase.

== Board games ==
The earliest board games based on Jeopardy! were produced by Milton Bradley, which produced thirteen such games throughout the course of the original Fleming version's run (issued annually from 1964 through 1976); these games were numbered 1–12 and 14, skipping 13.

The Trebek version has also seen various board game adaptations of its own. Pressman Toy Corporation first marketed several versions in the mid-to-late 1980s, including a version with electric signal devices and scoring consoles released in 1987, a "junior" edition (with questions for children ages 8–12), and a "25th Anniversary Edition" to mark the anniversary of the original Art Fleming version debut; the latter had special games featuring questions relating to the 1960s (although mistakenly stating that the original version debuted in 1965 rather than in 1964), in addition to new questions. Later versions were produced in the early 2000s, including a standard version, a version themed after The Simpsons, and most recently, an ESPN-branded sports version (in both standard and "travel folio" variants) which, like the 1987 version before it, features an electronic buzz-in console. Tyco Toys and Parker Brothers have also manufactured their own board game adaptations of the Trebek version of Jeopardy!

In both the Milton Bradley and Pressman versions, each game (a full Jeopardy! and Double Jeopardy! round) had five categories each; the host designated one of the Double Jeopardy! questions as "Final Jeopardy." The game played identically to the show otherwise.

== Video games ==
Jeopardy! has been adapted into a number of video games released on various consoles and handhelds spanning multiple hardware generations. Most Jeopardy! games released prior to 1998 were published by GameTek, which filed for Chapter 11 bankruptcy protection that year.

List of Jeopardy! video games
Title	Release date(s)	Developer(s)	Publisher(s)	Platform(s)
Jeopardy!	Unreleased (1983)		The Great Game Co.	Atari 2600
Jeopardy!	1987		ShareData	Apple II, Commodore 64, IBM PC
Jeopardy!	September 1988	Rare	GameTek	Nintendo Entertainment System
Jeopardy! Junior Edition	October 1989	Rare	GameTek	Nintendo Entertainment System
Jeopardy! 25th Anniversary Edition	June 1990	Rare	GameTek	Nintendo Entertainment System
Super Jeopardy!	September 1991	Imagineering	GameTek	Nintendo Entertainment System
Jeopardy!	December 1991	Data Design Interactive	GameTek	Game Boy
Jeopardy!	1992	Park Place Productions	GameTek	Game Gear, Sega Genesis, Super Nintendo Entertainment System
Jeopardy! Deluxe Edition	1993	Absolute Entertainment, Park Place Productions	GameTek	Sega Genesis, Super Nintendo Entertainment System
Jeopardy! Sports Edition	1994	GameTek	Electro Source, GameTek	Game Boy, Game Gear, MacOS, IBM PC, Sega Genesis, Super Nintendo Entertainment System
Jeopardy!	1994	Absolute Entertainment	Sony Imagesoft	IBM PC, Sega CD
Jeopardy!	1995	Accent Media Productions, Inc.	Philips Interactive Media	CD-i
Jeopardy!	February 25, 1998	GameTek	Take-Two Interactive	Nintendo 64
Jeopardy!	October 28, 1998	Artech Studios	MacSoft, Hasbro Interactive	MacOS, IBM PC, PlayStation
Jeopardy! 2nd Edition	September 30, 2000	Hasbro Interactive	ACE 2, MacSoft, Hasbro Interactive	MacOS, IBM PC, PlayStation
Jeopardy!	November 5, 2000		Electro Source, GameTek	MacOS
Jeopardy! 2003	October 28, 2003	Artech Studios	Atari Interactive	IBM PC, PlayStation 2
Jeopardy!	Unreleased (2004)		Majesco	Game Boy Color
Jeopardy! Super Deluxe	June 16, 2008		Encore, Inc.	MacOS, IBM PC
Jeopardy!	September 11, 2008	Sony Online Entertainment	Sony Online Entertainment	PlayStation 3
Jeopardy!	2010		Sony Pictures Television	iOS
Jeopardy!	November 2, 2010	Griptonite, Pipeworks Software	THQ	Nintendo DS, Wii
Jeopardy!	November 18, 2012	Pipeworks Software	THQ	PlayStation 3, Wii U, Xbox 360
Jeopardy! World Tour	May 17, 2017; October 6, 2023 (Note: As Jeopardy World Tour+)	Uken Games	Uken, Inc.	Android, iOS
Jeopardy!	November 7, 2017	Frima Studio	Ubisoft	Nintendo Switch, PlayStation 4, Xbox One

=== Consoles ===
An Atari 2600 adaptation of Jeopardy! was planned by The Great Game Co. in 1983, but that game ended up being cancelled during development. This would have been the only video game based on the Fleming version if it were released.

Then, from 1987 to 1990, Rare developed a series of three Jeopardy! games for the Nintendo Entertainment System. The first features general knowledge questions, the second is a "Junior Edition" featuring easier questions and child contestants, and the third is an "Anniversary Edition" honoring the 25th anniversary of the original Art Fleming version's debut. The Super Jeopardy! specials were given a video game adaptation for the NES, titled Talking Super Jeopardy! because of its periodic use of voice synthesis. Entertainment Weekly gave the game a C.

In 1992, GameTek released Jeopardy! video games for the Super NES and the Genesis. These two games were followed up by "Deluxe Editions" and "Sports Editions" in 1993 and 1994 respectively. Of the "Sports Editions" in particular, Computer Gaming World said that despite their "many flaws", they "[exude] a certain degree of charm" in emulating the positive and negative aspects of the television show. Later in 1994, Sony Imagesoft created a game based on the show for the Sega CD (with a subsequent PC version released in 1995), while Philips Interactive Media released a version on CD-i the following year, with clues being read by Wheel of Fortune announcer Charlie O'Donnell instead of Alex Trebek. GameTek's last Jeopardy! video game was completed and released after its bankruptcy, being published in 1998 for the Nintendo 64. It received negative reviews which criticized its graphics (particularly the absence of animation on the contestants) and the frequent recycling of questions. According to Gametek, the latter issue results from the fact that the game loses track of which questions have already been used every time the Nintendo 64 is powered off.

Hasbro Interactive produced two Jeopardy! video game adaptations of its own for Sony Computer Entertainment's PlayStation console in 1998 and 2000 (with subsequent PC versions released in the same years as the PlayStation versions); both versions feature clues that are read by announcer Johnny Gilbert instead of host Alex Trebek, while the latter appears in FMV sequences; while the second edition features behind-the-scenes interviews, an all-access backstage video, and a qualifying exam for contestants. Afterwards, Hasbro Interactive's successor Atari Interactive released a PlayStation 2 edition in October 2003 (with a PC version released the previous year). Then in 2008, Sony Online Entertainment created a Jeopardy! game for the PlayStation 3 through the PlayStation Network, using the Gamebryo engine.

On November 2, 2010, THQ released Jeopardy! video games for the Wii and Nintendo DS platforms. The company followed those up in 2012 by releasing games based on the show as a reworked version of the Wii version for the PlayStation 3, the Wii U, and Microsoft's Xbox 360.

On November 6, 2017, Ubisoft released Jeopardy! for PlayStation 4, and Xbox One, using the Unity engine. It would later be released on the Nintendo Switch a year later. However, the generic female host takes over Alex Trebek (before his death in 2020), while Johnny Gilbert still remains as announcer on the title screen, following the show's opening titles.

=== Handhelds ===
A Game Boy version of Jeopardy! was released by GameTek in 1991, and went on to spawn a "Sports Edition." Both versions were ported to the Game Boy's Sega rival, the Game Gear. The gameplay in the Sports Edition is identical to the Super NES and Genesis versions, though the portable versions lack the digitized voice and image of Alex Trebek and support only two players (where the console versions support three). Tiger Electronics also released several Jeopardy! electronic games of its own, including a version for its Game.com system. In 2004, Majesco planned a port of Jeopardy! for Game Boy Color, but those plans failed to materialize because the handheld had been discontinued by then.

In 2010, Sony Pictures Television, the show's production company, released an adaptation for the iPhone, iPod Touch, and iPad. The system was updated in 2012 with a number of online and local multiplayer modes.

In May 18, 2017, Sony Pictures Television once again released another adaptation, this time called as the Jeopardy! World Tour, for free on iOS and Android devices.

=== Other games ===
There have been many adaptations for personal computers. The first was released in 1987 by ShareData, which also released versions for the Apple II and the Commodore 64. Sony Imagesoft later released an MS-DOS version in 1994, along with the Sega CD version. In 1998, shortly after GameTek's closure, Hasbro Interactive created a Windows edition of Jeopardy!, which was followed up by a Mac version developed by MacSoft in 2000, and later by an updated version published by Infogrames in 2003. The show's latest Windows adaptation was a "Super Deluxe" edition released by Encore, Inc. in 2008.

In April 2011, GSN's interactive division teamed up with Sony Pictures Consumer Products to develop a Jeopardy! online game for Facebook, but that game has since been taken down. As of March 2013, video game adaptations of Jeopardy! also exist on Twitter, Android, and the Roku Channel Store.

== Classroom Jeopardy! ==
In 2002, in response to educators praising the longevity of the show's popularity and their students creating their own versions of the game to encourage student participation in class, educational toy company Educational Insights (which markets the GeoSafari system) released Classroom Jeopardy!, a self-contained, programmable game system based on Jeopardy! designed for use in schools. With this system, the teacher plays the role of host, while students can play the game on a normal classroom television set or an interactive whiteboard. Teachers are permitted to either use standardized games created for the grade levels of their classes, or write customized games of their own covering material that they are teaching at the moment. Originally, the game used a cartridge-based system for the categories and wireless remotes for the players and the host, with the unit itself acting as the scoreboard. There was also a small laptop-style keyboard that connected to the game unit and allowed for programming the cartridges via a small LCD screen on the unit. The uprated version of the system replaced the LCD screen and keyboard with a USB-connected device known as the "Classroom Jeopardy! Link," which allowed programming of the cartridges (and storage of unused games) via a PC or Macintosh (which included "Classroom Jeopardy! Editor" software).

The success of Classroom Jeopardy! led to the production of a home version, called Host Your Own Jeopardy!, which was released in 2004. Except for the names and included question content, this version was identical to the Classroom version. The Classroom edition featured one cartridge with 5 pre-programmed school-subject-based games; while the Host Your Own edition included four cartridges featuring 20 games used on the show, ranging from Kids Week level to Tournament Of Champions level. Educational Insights also produced additional scoreboards and controller units that could be connected to the main system and allow for more players per game (a maximum of nine additional scoreboards could be added, making for a maximum of 30 players/teams per game, although only the six highest-scoring players/teams could participate in Final Jeopardy!).

In 2011, Educational Insights released an updated version of the Classroom Jeopardy! system. The updated system featured a restyling of the console and remotes, dry-erase Final Jeopardy! boards, and a host remote with LCD "correct response" display. Additional functions included the ability to enter players' names into the console, and more varied wagers for Daily Doubles and Final Jeopardy! Additionally, this system used USB Flash Drives in place of the cartridges to program the console (the system included a 512K Flash Drive, but other larger Flash Drives could also be used). This also makes the updated system capable of using audiovisual clues (such as audio and video clips, music cues, and still images), properly-formatted math equation clues, and foreign "romance language" characters. The new system is not backward-compatible with the older cartridges and accessories, but games written with the older system's software can be easily converted via the new system's "Clue Studio" program. The entirety of the new system also fits into an included storage suitcase, allowing for easier transport of the unit. Both editions of the game were available after the release of the newer model, but since then, both have been discontinued. The websites for purchase have since gone down.

== Other merchandise ==
A DVD titled Jeopardy!: An Inside Look at America's Favorite Quiz Show was released on November 8, 2005, by Sony Pictures Home Entertainment. It features five of the most memorable episodes of the Trebek version: the very first Trebek episode in 1984, Episode #4657 (Ken Jennings' losing episode), and Episodes #4781, #4782, and #4783 (the three-game finals of the Ultimate Tournament of Champions, the last of which can be viewed through multiple camera angles), and there are also three featurettes: 21 Years of Answers and Questions, which discusses the show's history; and Jeopardy!: Behind the Answers and What Does It Take to Get a Clue?, both of which discuss the show's question selection process. The DVD also features some funny moments from the show, including Trebek presenting the beginning of the first show of the Ultimate Tournament of Champions Finals without trousers, and Johnny Gilbert mistaking Trebek for contestant coordinator Glenn Kagan, who rehearses as him; both of these are Easter eggs displayed as the show's trademark "Daily Doubles". The DVD's menu is displayed as the show's trademark game board, with the menu options as "categories"; picking one of these causes the board to load up, complete with sound effect, similar to the show.

In 2007, MGA Entertainment released the Jeopardy! DVD Home Game System, which allows groups of players to play the game of Jeopardy! from home with a similar experience to appearing on the actual show.

For the show's 15th anniversary season in 1998–99, a collectible watch was released. It plays the show's theme song, "Think!", with a push of a button, and includes 25 game cards with the answer-question format. Despite poor sales, several watches are currently being auctioned and sold on eBay as of today.

Every year, Day-to-Day Calendars' subsidiary Andrews McMeel Publishing releases a daily desktop Jeopardy! calendar, featuring 52 games for every week of the year, all of which have 1 clue per day (with the correct response on the back of each day's sheet). Entries for Monday through Wednesday are Jeopardy! Round Clues, those for Thursday through Saturday are Double Jeopardy! Round clues, and Sunday's entry is a Final Jeopardy! clue which allows the owner to "wager" all or part of their "total weekly winnings."

The brand has also been licensed into various slot machine games for casinos and the Internet.

On June 21, 2024, host Ken Jennings announced during the game a Jeopardy!-themed postage stamp to be released on Alex Trebek's birthday on July 22.

== International versions ==
The popularity of Jeopardy! in the United States has led the show's format to launch in many foreign countries throughout the world. This has led the American version to conduct "International Tournaments" in which champions from the show's foreign adaptations competed in a one-week tournament identical to the semifinals and finals of the American version's "Tournament of Champions".

Most versions are faithful to the American version's format, but some use unique formats of their own; for example, the Czech, Slovak and Italian adaptations eschew the show's trademark "answer and question" format in favor of a simple, standard quiz format, where clues are presented as questions or tasks and the contestants simply answer the questions or perform the tasks indicated, rather than providing responses phrased in the form of a question.

Complete list of international adaptations
Country	Title	Network(s)	Host(s)	Dates aired
(Arab League) Arab World	المحك; Al Mahak (Touchstone)	MBC 1	Ibrahim Abou Jawdeh	2011–2012
Argentina	Jeopardy!	Canal 13	Fernando Bravo	2006
Australia	Jeopardy!	Seven Network	Bob Sanders; Mal Walden; Graham Webb; Andrew Harwood	1970–1978
Australia	Jeopardy!	Network Ten (Note: Ten Network Holdings owns Australian rights since 2017 and licences it to other networks following CBS acquiring the company in 2017. This version in 1993 was produced before Ten was acquired.)	Tony Barber	1993
Australia	Jeopardy! Australia (Note: This version was recorded at Dock10 in Manchester, England.)	Nine Network	Stephen Fry	2024–present
Azerbaijan	61!	AzTV (2015–2018); İctimai Television (2018–present)	Leyla Quliyeva; DJ Fateh; Narmin Knyaz	2015–present
Belgium (Flanders)	Waagstuk! (Dare!)	VTM	Luc Appermont	1990–1997
Canada (Quebec)	Jeopardy!	TVA	Réal Giguère	1991–1993
China	这是什么; Zhe Shì shénme? (What's This?)	Webcast	Hao Tao	2016
Colombia	Los Mejores (The Best)	Cadena Uno (Producciones JES)	Marco Aurelio Álvarez	1987–1988
Croatia	Izazov! (Dare!)	HRT 1	Dražen Sirišćević; Joško Lokas	1998–2000
Czech Republic	Riskuj! (Risk!)	Nova	Pavel Svoboda; Ivan Vyskočil; Jan Krasl; Petr Svoboda; Jan Rosák	1994–2006
Denmark	Jeopardy!	TV2	Søren Kaster	1995–2000
Denmark	Jeopardy!	TV2	Lasse Rimmer	2000–2003
Denmark	Jeopardy!	TV2	Lars Daneskov	2003–2005
Denmark	Jeopardy!	TV3	Adam Duvå Hall	2014–2015
Estonia	Kuldvillak (Golden Fleece)	TV3; Kanal 2	Mart Mardisalu; Teet Margna; Eeva Esse	1998–2004; 2012–present
Finland	Jeopardy!	Nelonen	Ismo Apell	2007–2008
Finland	Jeopardy! Suomi	TV5	Kalle Lamberg	2024–2026
France	Jeopardy!	TF1	Philippe Risoli	1989–1992
Germany	Riskant! (Risky!)	RTL	Hans-Jürgen Bäumler	1990–1993
Germany	Jeopardy!	RTL	Frank Elstner	1994–1998
Germany	Jeopardy!	tm3	Gerriet Danz	1998–2000
Germany	Jeopardy!	RTLplus	Joachim Llambi	2016–2017
Germany	Jeopardy!	Sat.1	Ruth Moschner	2023
Greece	Κορώνα γράμματα Korona grammata (Heads or Tails) (Note: lit. 'Crown [and] Letters')	ERT	Dimitris Papamichael; Elena Akrita	1985–1986
Hungary	Mindent vagy Semmit! (All or Nothing!)	MTV1 (1993–1997); TV2 (1997–1999)	István Vágó	1993–1999
Israel	מלך הטריוויה; Melekh Ha Trivia (King of Trivia)	Channel 3	Eli Israeli	1997–2000
Italy	Rischiatutto (Risk all)	Secondo Programma; Programma Nazionale (Note: Only broadcast on 28 May, 4 June 1970, 3 June 1971, 3 February, 20, 27 May, 3 June 1972, 18, 25 May 1974)	Mike Bongiorno	1970–1974
Italy	Rischiatutto (Risk all)	Rai 1 (Note: First two episodes on 21 and 22 April); Rai 3 (Note: 27 October to 22 December)	Fabio Fazio	2016
Italy	Rischiatutto 70	Rai 1	Carlo Conti	2024
Japan	クイズグランプリ (Quiz Grand Prix)	Fuji Television	Hiroshi Koizumi	1970–1980
Latvia	Risks!	TV3	Jānis Romanovskis	2014–2015
Mexico	¡Jeopardy!	TV Azteca	Omar Fierro	1998–2000
Netherlands	Waagstuk! (Dare!)	SBS6	Albert Verlinde	1995–1996
Netherlands	Dayzers Donderdag (Dayzers Thursday)	RTL 4	Manuela Kemp	2002–2004
New Zealand	Jeopardy!	TVNZ	Mark Leishman	1992–1993
Norway	Jeopardy!	TV 2	Jens Brun-Pedersen (1994–1996); Nils Gunnar Lie (1996–1997); Trygve Rønningen (1997–2000)	1994–2000
Norway	Jeopardy!	TV Norge	H.C. Andersen	2004
Poland	Va banque (All in)	TVP2	Kazimierz Kaczor	1996–2003
Poland	Va banque (All in)	TVP2	Przemysław Babiarz	2020–2024
Poland	Va banque (All in)	TVP2	Radosław Kotarski	2024–present
Romania	Riști și câștigi! (Risk and Win)	PRO TV	Constantin Cotimanis; Cristi Iacob	1996–1998
Russia	Своя игра Svoya igra (Own game)	RTR (1994–1997); NTV (1997–1999; 2001–present); TV-6 (2000)	Pyotr Kuleshov	1994–present
Slovakia	Pokušenie! (Temptation)	Markíza	Michal Duriš; Jozef Dúbravský	1996–2006
Slovakia	Riskuj! (Risk!)	TV JOJ	Štefan Bučko; Dušan Ambróš	2002–2007; 2022–present
South Korea	장학퀴즈 (Scholarship Quiz)	MBC	Cha In-tae	1973–2024
Spain	Jeopardy!	Antena 3	Carlos Sobera	2007
Spain	Jeopardy	La 2	Paco de Benito	2025
Sweden	Jeopardy!	TV4	Magnus Härenstam	1991–2005
Sweden	Jeopardy!	TV4	Adam Alsing	2006–2007
Sweden	Jeopardy!	TV8	Pontus Gårdinger	2014–2015
Sweden	Jeopardy!	Kanal 5	Mikael Tornving	2023–present
Turkey	Riziko! (Risk!)	TRT 1 (1994–1996); Kanal 7 (1998–2000)	Serhat Hacıpaşalıoğlu	1994–2000
Turkey	Büyük Risk (Big Risk)	Star TV	Selçuk Yöntem	2012–2014
United Kingdom	Jeopardy!	Channel 4	Derek Hobson	1983–1984
United Kingdom	Jeopardy!	ITV	Chris Donat; Steve Jones	1990; 1991–1993
United Kingdom	Jeopardy!	Sky One	Paul Ross	1995–1996
United Kingdom	Jeopardy!	ITV	Stephen Fry	2024–2025
Uzbekistan	Antiqa Mantiq (Unusual Utterance)	Toshkent	Ganisher Rakhmatullaev	2010–2014

=== Canadian broadcasting ===
Even though the program has spawned many foreign adaptations, the American syndicated version of Jeopardy! is itself broadcast across the world, with international distribution rights held by Paramount Global Content Distribution.

In Canada, Jeopardy! had aired largely on local stations since its debut. Like most American game shows that air in Canada, Canadians are eligible to appear as contestants on the American version, with notable examples including 1990 Tournament of Champions winner Bob Blake and 1997 International Jeopardy! Tournament winner Michael Daunt. Before 2008, Jeopardy! aired across Canada mostly on CTV stations, although the Vancouver CTV station CIVT-TV has never aired the show (the show has aired before on local Global station CHAN-TV).

From 2008 to 2012, the show was broadcast by all affiliates of CBC Television except for CBET-DT in Windsor, Ontario (due to broadcast rights in that region being held by WDIV-TV in Detroit). Funding decreases to CBC led to the network declining to renew Jeopardy! and Wheel for the 2012–13 season.

As of 2018, Yes TV currently serves as Canada's syndicator for Jeopardy! episodes. NTV, a Newfoundland-based semi-independent television station, has carried the show through its run on CTV and Yes TV.

In French Canada, just as Wheel of Fortune once had its own French-Canadian version, there was also a French-Canadian version of Jeopardy! that aired for a few seasons in Quebec, on TVA, from 1991 to 1993.

== See also ==
- List of television game show franchises
