= Jeopardy! (British game show) =

British television quiz show

- Genre: Game show
- Based on: Jeopardy! by Merv Griffin
- Presented by: Derek Hobson; Chris Donat; Steve Jones; Paul Ross; Stephen Fry
- Announcer: Nick Jackson; David Hopewell; Charles Foster; Des Clarke
- Country of origin: United Kingdom
- Original language: English
- No. of series: 2 (Channel 4); 3 (ITV); 1 (Sky One); 2 (revival)
- No. of episodes: 25 (Channel 4); 125 (ITV); 135 (Sky One); 45 (revival)

Production
- Production locations: Television House (1995–96); Dock10 (2024–25)
- Running time: 30 minutes (1983–96); 60 minutes (2024–25)
- Production companies: Thames (1983–84); Reg Grundy Productions and TVS/Meridian (1990–93); Action Time (Note: In association with Columbia TriStar Television and King World Productions) (1995–96); Whisper North (Note: In association with Sony Pictures Television and Paramount Global Content Distribution) (2024–25)

Original release
- Network: Channel 4
- Release: 12 January 1983 – 2 July 1984
- Network: ITV
- Release: 3 September 1990 – 9 April 1993
- Network: Sky One
- Release: 4 December 1995 – 7 June 1996
- Network: ITV
- Release: 1 January 2024 – 24 April 2025

Related
- Jeopardy!

Jeopardy! is a British game show based on the American game show Jeopardy!. Originally aired on Channel 4 from 12 January 1983 to 2 July 1984, hosted by Derek Hobson, the show was later revived by ITV from 3 September 1990 to 9 April 1993. Initially hosted by Chris Donat in 1990, it was later presented by Steve Jones from 1991 to 1993. The show then moved to Sky One from 4 December 1995 to 7 June 1996, with Paul Ross as the host. It was revived for a third time on 1 January 2024, returning to ITV, with Stephen Fry as presenter. On 17 February 2026, it was reported that ITV had axed the series with no plans for future series.

== Gameplay ==
The Stephen Fry iteration of the series is modelled after the current format of the American version of Jeopardy!, with two rounds using cash amounts of £25, £50, £75, £100, and £125 (£150 in the 2024 series), followed by a third, Double Jeopardy! round with doubled values (£50, £100, £150, £200, and £250, or £300 in the 2024 series), and concluding with Final Jeopardy! There is one Daily Double in each of the first two rounds, and two Daily Doubles in the Double Jeopardy! round.

Earlier incarnations of Jeopardy! in the UK had rule differences in comparison to the American version. Due to limits on cash prizes enforced by broadcast regulators, the game was originally played with points rather than cash, with values of 5, 10, 15, 20, and 25 in the Jeopardy! round, and three Daily Doubles in each round. Champions received a flat £500 for each victory; a champion retired undefeated after five consecutive victories and won an additional £500 for a total of £3,000. Beginning in the Steve Jones run, the top three scorers of each series returned for Master Jeopardy! (the equivalent of the Tournament of Champions in the American show) to play for the grand prize of a holiday.

Points were replaced by pounds at some point in the Jones run, but later reverted to points by the time Ross took over as host—having increased to 100 to 500 for the Jeopardy! round and 200 to 1000 for Double Jeopardy! The Daily Double amount was reduced to the standard of one in the Jeopardy! Round and two in the Double Jeopardy! round. As with the American version, the current Stephen Fry version is played for cash, and does not have limits on returning champions.

In the Hobson, Donat, and Jones runs, the contestants only saw their own scores, although, at the end of each round, they were told their relative positions (i.e., who was in first, second, and third place). This had the side effect of reducing "runaways", a common phenomenon in the American version, where contestants heading into Final Jeopardy! with more than double their nearest opponent would be guaranteed victory by betting a small amount; most contestants did not pay enough attention to others' correct or incorrect responses to know if they had clinched a runaway game.

Also under Hobson, Donat, Jones and Ross, the response had to be grammatically correct in addition to the usual requirement of phrasing in the form of a question. For example, a response that began "Who is..." when a "What is..." prefix was grammatically correct was ruled incorrect, and the contestant received a penalty.

== 2024 revival ==
On 27 February 2023, ITV announced that the show would be revived again, produced by Whisper Films (a studio minority-owned by Jeopardy! rightsholder Sony Pictures Television), presented by comedian Stephen Fry, and filmed at the Dock10 studios in Salford. In April 2023, Fry was also announced as host of an Australian revival for the Nine Network; it is filmed in Salford with Australian expats as contestants.

The new British series, delayed from October 2023, premiered on 1 January 2024. By the request of Fry, the revival would be modelled extensively after the current American version, although extended with an extra round between the Jeopardy! and Double Jeopardy! rounds to fill an hour-long time slot.

The first series of the Stephen Fry version received mixed reviews, with the slow pace and Fry's hosting style being common criticisms. American online magazine Slate contrasted it to the original American half-hour version of Jeopardy!, describing it as being "slower, sleepier, and irritatingly nonchalant" with its low cash values, and being padded out by a third round (Note: This is not unlike the American prime time Celebrity Jeopardy! but instead playing two rounds before Double Jeopardy! instead of adding Triple Jeopardy! as the third round) and Fry's slow pacing (including a penchant to provide commentary on the subjects of clues), observing that "when [Alex] Trebek was really cooking, he could marshal out three questions in 30 seconds. Fry is lucky to get through one a minute." It was also noted that Jeopardy! had never had the same prominence in UK popular culture as it had in the United States.

In an interview prior to series 2, Fry stated that the show's pacing would be improved, noting that "there is something about the rat-a-tat-tat of the game. The questions keep coming, and that adds to the tension and the excitement, and to the uniqueness of Jeopardy!" In addition, to fill out the time, a seventh category has been added to each round.

== Transmissions ==
Series overall	Series	Start date	End date	Episodes	Presenter
Channel 4 era
1	1	12 January 1983	30 March 1983	12	Derek Hobson
2	2	2 April 1984	2 July 1984	13	Derek Hobson
ITV era
3	1	3 September 1990	26 October 1990	40	Chris Donat
4	2	14 October 1991	20 December 1991	50	Steve Jones
5	3	22 February 1993	9 April 1993	35	Steve Jones
Sky One era
6	1	4 December 1995	7 June 1996	135	Paul Ross
ITV revival era
7	1	1 January 2024	26 January 2024	20	Stephen Fry
8	2	17 March 2025	24 April 2025	25	Stephen Fry
