= Pyramid (game show) =

American game show

- Genre: Game show
- Created by: Bob Stewart
- Written by: Michael X. Ferraro; Shawn Kennedy; Anna Lotto; Karen Lurie
- Directed by: Mike Gargiulo; Bruce Burmester; Paul Nichols; Bob Loudin; Paul Overacker; Rob George; Rich DiPirro
- Presented by: Dick Clark; Bill Cullen; John Davidson; Donny Osmond; Mike Richards; Michael Strahan
- Announcer: Bob Clayton; Jack Clark; Steve O'Brien; Alan Kalter; Johnny Gilbert; Charlie O'Donnell; John Cramer; JD Roberto; Brad Abelle
- Theme music composer: Ken Aldin; Bob Cobert; Barry Coffing; John Blaylock; Alan Ett; Scott Liggett; Bleeding Fingers Music
- Composer: Bob Cobert
- Country of origin: United States
- Original language: English
- No. of episodes: 4,020 (1973–1988); 40 (2012); 99 (2016–present)

Production
- Executive producers: Bob Stewart; Stephen Brown; Michael Davies; Maureen Fitzpatrick; Vin Rubino; Constance Schwartz; Michael Strahan
- Producers: Anne Marie Schmidt; Sande Stewart; Francine Bergman; Jane Rothchild; David Michaels; Erin Perry; Stephen Brown; Cathy Cotter; John Ricci Jr. Jonathan Bourne
- Running time: 22 minutes (1973–2012); 44 minutes (2016–present)
- Production companies: Bob Stewart Productions (1973–1988); Basada, Inc. (1973–1974, 1978–1981, 1986–1988); 20th Century Fox Television (1985–1988); Stewart Tele Enterprises (1991); Carolco Television Productions (1991); Sony Pictures Television (2002–2004, 2012, 2016–present) (Note: Credited as Columbia TriStar Domestic Television (2002).); Embassy Row (2012); GSN Originals (2012); SMAC Productions (2016–present)

Original release
- Network: The $10,000 Pyramid: CBS (1973–1974); ABC (1974–1976); The $20,000 Pyramid: ABC (1976–1980); The $25,000 Pyramid: Weekly syndication (1974–1979); The $50,000 Pyramid: Daily syndication (1981); The (New) $25,000 Pyramid: CBS (1982–87, 1988); The $100,000 Pyramid: Daily syndication (1985–1988, 1991); Pyramid: Daily syndication (2002–2004); The Pyramid: GSN (2012); The $100,000 Pyramid: ABC (2016–present)
- Release: March 26, 1973 – present

Pyramid is an American game show franchise that has aired several versions domestically and internationally. The show was developed by Bob Stewart. The original series, The $10,000 Pyramid, debuted on CBS on March 26, 1973, and spawned seven subsequent Pyramid series. Most later series featured a full title format matching the original series, with the title reflecting an increasing top prize. Two teams, each consisting of a celebrity and contestant, attempt to convey mystery words and phrases within a common category, against a time limit, to win cash and prizes. The title refers to the show's pyramid-shaped gameboard, featuring six categories arranged in a triangular fashion. The various Pyramid series have won a total of nine Daytime Emmys for Outstanding Game Show, second only to Jeopardy!, which has won 13.

Dick Clark is the host most commonly associated with the show, having hosted the network daytime version from 1973 to 1980 (which moved from CBS to ABC in 1974, and increased its namesake top prize from $10,000 to $20,000 in 1976) and The (New) $25,000 Pyramid from 1982 to 1988 on CBS. Clark also hosted two weeknight syndicated versions, The $50,000 Pyramid in 1981 and The $100,000 Pyramid from 1985 to 1988 (concurrent with the daytime show).

Bill Cullen hosted the first weekly nighttime version of The $25,000 Pyramid from 1974 to 1979. John Davidson hosted The $100,000 Pyramid in 1991, and Donny Osmond hosted a version simply titled Pyramid from 2002 to 2004; both aired five episodes per week. Game Show Network's The Pyramid, hosted by Mike Richards, who was an executive at format owner Sony Pictures Television, aired a single forty-episode season in 2012.

The current incarnation of The $100,000 Pyramid debuted June 26, 2016, on ABC with Michael Strahan as host. On November 11, 2024, it was announced that The $100,000 Pyramid would be renewed for an eighth season, which premiered on March 9, 2025.

== Gameplay ==
The Pyramid's game boards feature six categories arranged in a triangle (referred to as a pyramid), with three on the bottom row, two on the middle row, and one on the top. Most variations of gameplay feature two teams, each composed of a contestant and a celebrity. The game's central premise involves teams taking turns, with one player attempting to describe mystery words or phrases to their teammate against a time limit. The higher scoring team wins the game and plays the bonus round, known as the Winner's Circle.

=== Main game ===
Charles Siebert uses pantomime to describe "lasso" on The $25,000 Pyramid in 1982.

At the beginning of the game, the host reads off six categories from which the team in control picks. These denote the common subject of a series of words or phrases to be described within that category, and usually take the form of wordplay (such as "Playing footsie" leading to a category of "things you do with your feet"). One member of the team is then displayed one word or phrase at a time on a monitor, and must describe each to their partner within a time limit. The team member giving the clues may use verbal clues that do not contain any part of the answer (for example, using "high up" for "height"), as well as non-verbal clues such as gestures. One point is scored for each item correctly guessed, and words for which illegal clues are given are eliminated from play. The clue giver may also choose to pass on a word; while a point is still awarded for any word correctly guessed after passing, no further clues may be given on a passed word unless time remains after all other words are guessed. All versions of the show feature a maximum of seven words and a 30-second time limit for each category, except for the 2002-04 version, which used six words and 20 seconds.

Three rounds are played, with each team playing one category per round until all six have been played or one team has attained an insurmountable lead, whichever comes first. Teams decide which member will give and receive for the first round; the roles are reversed for the second, and they again choose for the third.

In versions prior to the 2010s, tie scores were broken by an additional round of gameplay. The team that scored the tying point was offered a choice of two different letters of the alphabet. That team then played seven words beginning with that letter, after which the opposing team played words beginning with the other letter. The tie was then broken by whichever team scored more points or, if both teams solved all seven words, whichever team did so in a shorter amount of time. The 2016 version breaks ties by whichever team achieved their score in the shorter total time.

The winning team proceeds to the show's bonus round, known as the Winner's Circle. Once this round is completed, a second main game is played with the celebrities switching teams and a new set of six categories. The winners of this game play the second and final Winner's Circle of the episode.

==== Bonuses ====
The game board has often featured a number of spaces which award bonus prizes to the contestants.

Throughout the 1970s, a random category during the main game doubled as the "Big 7", which awarded a prize to the contestant if all seven words were guessed correctly. Beginning in 1982, one category in the second game was designated as the "Mystery 7", in which the host did not reveal the topic of the category until after it had been played, and correctly guessing all seven words awarded a bonus prize. The Mystery 7 was initially shown as one of the six category names, but was later hidden behind a randomly chosen category. This bonus is the only one in play for the 2016 version, hidden on the board during the second game of each half-hour.

In 1983, The $25,000 Pyramid introduced a new bonus space called the "7-11", which was randomly concealed behind a category in the first game of each episode. If this was revealed, the team could elect to play for $50 cash per word solved, or $1,100 for solving all seven; the former option was dropped in early 1985. Throughout its run, this version awarded a bonus prize (originally a car, later $5,000 cash) to the eventual winner of any game that ended in a perfect 21-21 tie.

The 1991 version offered additional bonuses. "Gamble for a Grand"/"Gamble for a Trip" offered the choice to reduce the round's time limit from 30 to 25 seconds to win $1,000 cash or a trip, respectively, and "Double Trouble" offered the team 45 seconds to guess seven two-word responses for a $500 bonus.

The Donny Osmond–hosted version had one bonus: "Super Six", which was featured in both games each day, and awarded an additional prize for guessing all six words in 20 seconds.

On the Game Show Network version, there were no bonuses behind the categories, but correctly guessing all seven words in a category awarded $500 to the contestant and added $5,000 to the Winner's Circle bank.

=== Winner's Circle ===
A contestant gives clues to Kathy Najimy in the Winner's Circle on The $100,000 Pyramid in 2016.

The winning team from the main game plays the Winner's Circle, in which one member must describe six categories, ostensibly of increasing difficulty, to their partner within 60 seconds by giving a short and concise list of items relating to each category in play. (For instance, the category "things that clean" could be described with clues such as "soap", "a vacuum", or "a maid's broom".) The team is credited with solving a category as long as the guesser says some form of its key word (any form of the word "clean") before time runs out. Some categories offer a synonym for the key word, such as "things that disappear (vanish)"; either one may be said to gain credit. Although it has not been stated in official rules, since Strahan has been hosting, the contestant gives the clues and the celebrity must guess the categories. In prior versions of the show, celebrities usually gave the clues. In the earliest episodes of the show, the host would ask the contestant whether they wanted to give or receive clues.

The clue giver may pass on a category and return to it after playing through all six if time remains on the clock. Giving an illegal clue removes the category from play. These include using gestures (which were permitted until 1974); using any part of a key word in the category, an acronym, a direct definition, or a direct synonym of it; using a descriptive prepositional phrase or adverb (unless the category implicitly allows it, e.g., "on a table" or "in my pocket" for "Where You Keep Your Keys"); or listing an item that does not fit the category. Each category in the Winner's Circle has a cash amount attached to it; successfully playing all six categories wins the top cash prize for that round, while failing to do so awards the cash amounts attached to all solved categories.

==== Top Prizes ====
Originally, every Winner's Circle was played for the $10,000 prize, and contestants left the show upon winning it. When the show became The $20,000 Pyramid, contestants would play the first Winners' Circle for $10,000; if unsuccessful, their next visit would be for $15,000, and any future tries would be for the full $20,000. However, players left the show after winning this round once, regardless of the amount at stake.

For the syndicated and CBS $25,000 and the two syndicated $100,000 series, the first visit to the Winner's Circle for either player on any given show was played for $10,000. If the same contestant won both games, a victory in the second Winner's Circle increased their total for the day (not including any main-game bonuses) to $25,000, regardless of their success or failure on their first attempt.

The syndicated $50,000 awarded top prizes of $5,000 and $10,000 in the Winner's Circle; that version and the two syndicated $100,000 series awarded their titular top prizes via special tournament events that brought back previously successful players.

The $100,000 series in particular involved a round-robin format wherein the three contestants who conquered the Winner’s Circle in the fastest amount of time over a series of several weeks returned to play again. The first player to win a Winner’s Circle round at any point won $100,000 and ended the tournament. If the win occurred in the first half of the show, then the second half was played by the two runners-up for a Winner's Circle prize of $10,000. The bonus cards were eliminated during the $100,000 tournaments, but the $5,000 perfect 21-21 bonus stayed during the 80s $100,000 version.

2012's The Pyramid set every Winner's Circle at a base of $10,000, adding $5,000 for every perfect 7/7 round the player achieved in the main game, for a $25,000 maximum.

The ABC $100,000 version offers $50,000 on a player's first trip to the Winner's Circle, and $100,000 on their second. Any player who reaches this round twice keeps their winnings from both visits, for a potential total of $150,000.

== History ==
=== Broadcast history ===
==== The $10,000 Pyramid ====
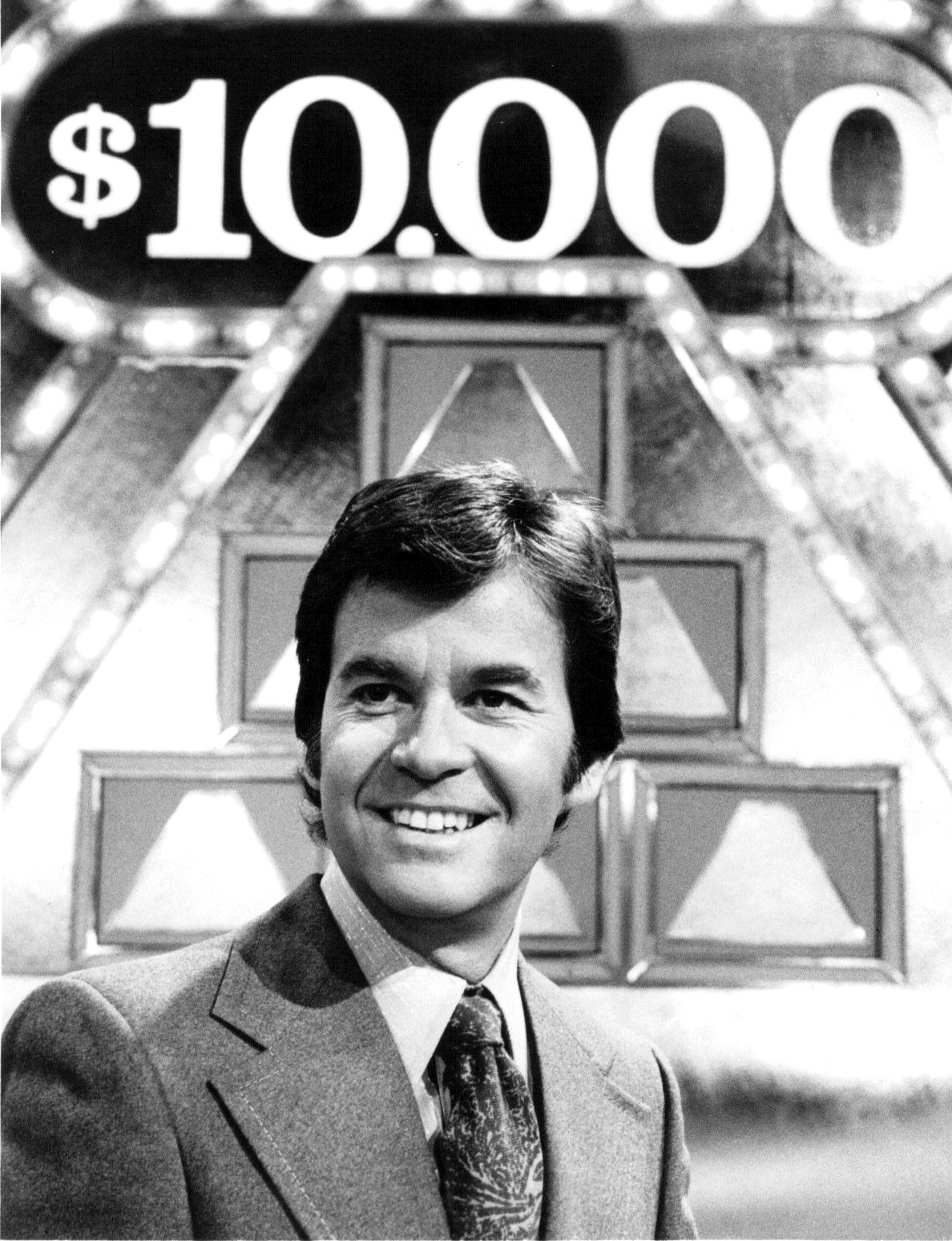
Dick Clark (age 44) as host of The $10,000 Pyramid (1974).

On March 26, 1973, The $10,000 Pyramid, with host Dick Clark, made its network debut and was a ratings hit, sustaining its ratings even when episodes were delayed or preempted by the Watergate hearings. A year later, the ratings temporarily declined (against the original version of Jeopardy! on NBC) and CBS canceled it. The show was quickly picked up by ABC and began airing on that network on May 6, 1974. As per CBS custom at the time with celebrity game shows, three weeks of episodes for CBS were taped in Hollywood at Television City, Studio 31. The remainder of the CBS episodes originated in New York City at the Ed Sullivan Theater, moving to ABC's Elysee Theatre after Pyramid switched networks. Initially slotted on ABC at 4:00pm, replacing reruns of Love, American Style, it was moved to 2:00pm on December 23, 1974, replacing The Newlywed Game in the timeslot, and filled the old 4:00pm timeslot with The Money Maze, as part of a plan by ABC daytime vice president Michael Brockman to reorganize the daytime lineup to counter on its youth identity.

==== The $20,000 Pyramid ====
Beginning on January 19, 1976, the series doubled its top prize and was retitled The $20,000 Pyramid. On January 16, 1978, due to the expansion of the soaps One Life to Live and General Hospital from 45 minutes to one hour, the show moved to noon, while continuing to produce higher ratings. From October 1 to November 9, 1979, the series briefly became Junior Partner Pyramid, which scrapped the usual celebrity-contestant pairings in favor of children playing the game with a parent or other adult relative. Its last episode aired June 27, 1980, with Family Feud subsequently moving up a half-hour to take over the 12:00 noon (EST) slot formerly occupied by The $20,000 Pyramid.

==== The (New) $25,000 Pyramid ====
Title card of the 1980s (New) $25,000 Pyramid.

A weekly syndicated The $25,000 Pyramid aired concurrently with the daytime version from 1974 to 1979 with Bill Cullen as host. On September 20, 1982, a new $25,000 Pyramid premiered on CBS in daytime, replacing reruns of One Day at a Time, with Dick Clark returning as host. From November 8, 1982 to January 25, 1985, the word New was added to the title in order to distinguish it from the earlier Cullen-hosted version, which was still airing in reruns in some markets. The series taped in Los Angeles full-time at CBS Television City's Studio 33 (formerly used for The Price Is Right, now known as the "Bob Barker Studio"). The series remained there for the entire run (except for some episodes that were filmed in studio 41 in September 1983) until its cancellation. The last episode of the series aired on Thursday, December 31, 1987. Blackout replaced this version of Pyramid and began airing in the series' 10:00 a.m. timeslot on Monday, January 4, 1988; however, Blackout was canceled after thirteen weeks, and Pyramid returned to the CBS daytime schedule for thirteen additional weeks, beginning on April 4. (Its quick return was aided by the continuing production of the nighttime $100,000 version.) The final episode of The $25,000 Pyramid aired on July 1, 1988, and was replaced by a revival of Family Feud, hosted by Ray Combs, the following Monday.

==== The $100,000 Pyramid ====
Concurrent with the network show's run, several nighttime versions of the show were sold to local stations through syndication: the original $25,000 Pyramid and The $50,000 Pyramid were taped in the Elysee Theatre in New York, and both editions of The $100,000 Pyramid were taped at Television City. The Dick Clark–hosted episodes were taped in Studio 33 concurrently with the daytime $25,000 Pyramid, and the 1991 edition hosted by John Davidson was taped in Studio 31.

On January 9, 2016, ABC greenlit a new version of The $100,000 Pyramid, set to air during the summer of 2016. This version also marked the return of the show to New York City, where it had originally been produced in the 1970s. The first season comprised ten hour-long episodes, with Michael Strahan serving as host. The show aired as part of ABC's Sunday Fun & Games lineup at 9:00 p.m. ET/8:00 p.m. CT, along with the Steve Harvey–hosted Celebrity Family Feud and the Alec Baldwin–hosted Match Game (the latter of which ended in July 2021). Each hour-long episode of The $100,000 Pyramid consists of two complete pairs of games, with two different celebrities and two new players for each; there are no returning champions. In addition, two introductions and two closings are taped for each episode so that it can be split into half-hour blocks to fit a channel's programming schedule if necessary.

This incarnation of The $100,000 Pyramid debuted on ABC on June 26, 2016; the first season ran until September 12, 2016. The show was renewed for a second season, which premiered on June 11, 2017 and ran until September 24, 2017. On August 6, 2017, the show was renewed for a third season, which ran from June 10, 2018 to September 23, 2018; the show was then renewed for a fourth season which ran from June 9, 2019 to September 22, 2019. On November 20, 2019, the series was renewed for a fifth season, which premiered on May 26, 2021 and ran until September 15, 2021.

In August 2020, production for season five of The $100,000 Pyramid began in New York City with new safety protocols and guidelines introduced; these guidelines include measures such as crew and contestants having their temperatures tested, Personal Protective Equipment (PPE) on-site, and social distancing measures. This season did not feature an in-studio audience due to the COVID-19 pandemic.

On January 6, 2022, ABC renewed The $100,000 Pyramid for a sixth season, and moved the show from New York City to Los Angeles. The first half of the sixth season premiered on July 10, 2022 and ran until December 6, 2022, while the second half of the sixth season premiered on July 9, 2023 and ran until August 27, 2023. The show was ultimately renewed for a seventh season which premiered on September 28, 2023 and concluded on December 13, 2023.

On November 11, 2024, it was announced that The $100,000 Pyramid would be renewed for an eighth season; the eighth season premiered on March 9, 2025.

=== Later developments ===
In late 1996, Sony Pictures Television (then-Columbia TriStar Television) produced a pilot for a new version of Pyramid, with Mark L. Walberg as host, which featured a format radically different from the earlier versions, including an increase of the number of celebrities to six, each of which would be assigned to a different main game subject. It did not sell, but Sony tried again the following year, this time with Chuck Woolery at the helm and a format closer to the original, although the six-celebrity motif from the previous pilot remained. This version also failed to sell, but two years later, after the success of its series Rock & Roll Jeopardy! on VH1, Sony attempted to give Pyramid similar treatment with a 1999 pilot called Pyramid Rocks. Hosted by Bil Dwyer, the format likewise attempted to incorporate music into the game, but proved no more successful than the previous two attempts at reviving the series.

The show would remain off the air until 2002, when a syndicated series, simply titled Pyramid, successfully sold its pilot and was ordered for a full season. The series was hosted by Donny Osmond and ran for two seasons from September 16, 2002 to May 21, 2004, with reruns airing until September 10, 2004. The show was taped at Sony Pictures Studios in Culver City, California.

Following CBS's cancellation of the long-running soap opera Guiding Light in April 2009, Pyramid was one of three potential series considered as a replacement for the veteran soap opera. (Let's Make a Deal and The Dating Game as The New Dating Game or The Newlywed Game as The New Newlywed Game were the other two, with a pilot shot for the former series.) During the tapings that took place in June of that year at the Kaufman Astoria Studios in New York, the top prize was raised to a potential $1,000,000 with a tournament format similar to the $100,000 format. Dean Cain and Tim Vincent were tapped as hosts, with Sony Pictures game show legend Ken Jennings serving as a panelist. Alan Kalter, who announced The $50,000 Pyramid and was now working for CBS through Late Show with David Letterman, returned as the announcer for the pilots.

CBS passed on Pyramid and opted to pick up Let's Make a Deal, hosted by Wayne Brady, as Guiding Light's replacement. Several months later, in December 2009, CBS announced the cancellation of another long-running soap opera, As the World Turns. Pyramid was once again among the series being considered as a potential replacement. CBS ordered a third pilot on April 9, 2010. Andy Richter was identified as a potential host. On May 18, 2011, TBS announced development of a possible new version of Pyramid, again to be hosted by Richter, who by then was associated with TBS through his work on Conan O’Brien’s talk show. It was later announced that the show was not picked up.

Another pilot, titled The Pyramid, was taped on June 16, 2012. On July 12, 2012, GSN announced The Pyramid had been picked up and would premiere on the network on September 3, with Mike Richards hosting the show. The series ran for 40 episodes before being cancelled later in the year. The Pyramid was taped at the CBS Studio Center.

== Conception ==
Television producer Bob Stewart developed The $10,000 Pyramid in 1973. The show's format was adapted from an unsold television pilot Stewart had filmed earlier titled Cash on the Line.

== Personnel ==
Bob Clayton was the series' original announcer and performed these duties until his death in 1979. Alan Kalter and Steve O'Brien shared the primary announcer role until The $50,000 Pyramid ended production in 1981. Substitutes included Fred Foy, John Causier, Dick Heatherton, Scott Vincent, and Ed Jordan.

When the series was revived and production moved to California in 1982, Jack Clark became the announcer and held the position until 1985. Johnny Gilbert became the primary announcer for The $25,000 Pyramid while Charlie O'Donnell took the job for The $100,000 Pyramid when it launched that fall. Both Gilbert and O'Donnell substituted for each other on their respective series; other substitutes included Jerry Bishop, Rod Roddy, Bob Hilton, Charlie Tuna, and Dean Goss. In 1991, Gilbert and Goss were both featured announcers and frequent panelist Henry Polic II also announced for several weeks. John Cramer announced the 2002–04 version, and JD Roberto announced The Pyramid (2012). The 2016 ABC primetime version is announced by Brad Abelle.

Mike Gargiulo directed through 1981, with Bruce Burmester replacing him until the end of the 1991 version.

The original theme tune was "Tuning Up" by Ken Aldin. In 1982, it was replaced by an original, similarly styled composition by Bob Cobert, which was also used in 1991. Barry Coffing and John Blaylock composed the theme and incidental music for the 2002–04 version, while Alan Ett composed a cover of Bob Cobert's 1982–91 theme for The Pyramid. Bleeding Fingers Music composed a separate cover of Cobert's theme for the 2016 version.

== International versions ==
Country	Name	Host	Channel	Air dates
Albania	Piramida	Bora Zemani	Top Channel	October 29, 2024 – February 13, 2026
Australia	Pyramid	Shura Taft	Nine Network (2009–2012); 9Go! (2013–2014)	September 1, 2009 – 2014
Canada (Quebec)	Pyramide	Sébastien Benoit	Radio-Canada	April 28, 2008 – April 22, 2011
Chile	Contrarreloj	Esperanza Silva; Fernando Rosselot	Canal 13	2002
Egypt	الهرم; El Haram	Moufida Sheeha	ERT 2	May 16, 2009
Ethiopia	ማን ያሸንፋል? Man Yashenfal?	Zeweter Desalegn	EBS TV	2021; 2023–present
Estonia	Püramiid	Teet Margna	TV3	March 4, 2006
France	Pyramide	Patrice Laffont (1991–2001; 2002–2003); Marie-Ange Nardi (2002); Olivier Minne (2014–2015)	Antenne 2 (1991–1992); France 2 (1992–2003; 2014–2015)	1991–2003; 2014–2015
Germany	Die Pyramide	Dieter Thomas Heck (1979–1994); Micky Beisenherz and Joachim Llambi (2012); Jörg Pilawa (2023)	ZDF; ZDFneo; Sat.1	1979–1994; 2012; 2023
Germany	Hast Du Worte!?	Jörg Pilawa (1996–1997); Thomas Koschwitz (1997–1999)	Sat.1	1996–1999
Indonesia	Piramida	Ronnie Sianturi; Ricky Johannes	RCTI	September 4, 1995 – November 26, 1999; February 5, 2000 – October 21, 2000
Indonesia	Piramida Baru	Ricky Johannes	RCTI	July 30, 2001 – November 5, 2002
Iran	Pyramid	Sina Valiollah	PMC	2009
Israel	שחק אותה; Play It	Yigal Shilon; Dudu Topaz	Channel 1	1979–1980; 1983–1984
Israel	הפירמידה; HaPyramida	Oded Menashe	Channel 2	2002
Italy	Pyramid	Enrico Brignano and Debora Salvalaggio	Rai Due	December 3, 2007 – February 3, 2008
Malaysia	Piramida	Perdana Emas	Suria	2000 – Early 2000s
Nigeria	The ₦10,000,000 Pyramid	Enyinna Nwigwe	African Magic Showcase Channel	2024
Poland	Piramida	Hubert Urbański; Andrzej Strzelecki	Polsat	1997–2000
Portugal	A Grande Pirâmide	Sergio Figueira; Manuel Luis Goucha	RTP1	1994–1995
Russia	Пирамида; Piramida	Ivan Urgant	Telekanal Rossiya	May 16, 2004 – March 20, 2005
Singapore	The Pyramid Game	Samuel Chong; Benedict Goh; Darryl David	Channel 5	1994–1999
Spain	La pirámide	Itziar Miranda	La 1	July 18, 2025 – August 8, 2025
Spain	La pirámide	Itziar Miranda	La 2	September 30, 2025 – October 17, 2025
Turkey	Piramit	Mim Kemal Öke	aTV	1994–1995
Turkey	Piramit	Yusuf Çim	Show TV	2015–2016
United Kingdom	The £1,000 Pyramid Game	Steve Jones	ITV	1981–1984
United Kingdom	The Pyramid Game	Steve Jones	ITV	1989–1990
United Kingdom	Donny's Pyramid Game	Donny Osmond	Challenge	2007
Venezuela	Match 4	Juan Manuel Montesinos	Venevisiόn	1984–1989
Venezuela	Contra reloj	Daniela Kosán	Televen	2001–2002
Vietnam	Kim tự tháp	Chi Bảo	HTV7 (2005–2007); HTV9 (2007–2008)	April 30, 2005 – 2008

The British version was called The Pyramid Game and ran intermittently from 1981 to 1990, with Steve Jones as host. Donny Osmond hosted a short-lived incarnation in 2007, which used a similar set and the same music package as the 2002 American version.

In 2009, Sony created an Australian version of The Junior Partner Pyramid called simply Pyramid. This version was hosted by Shura Taft until 2012, with Graham Matters taking over the following year.

A German version titled Die Pyramide aired on ZDF from 1979 to 1994, and was hosted by Dieter Thomas Heck. A new version aired on ZDFneo in 2012, and was co-hosted by Micky Beisenherz and Joachim Llambi.

Versions in French, both titled Pyramide, were produced at different times in France and in Canada.

== Home games ==
The first board game of The $10,000 Pyramid was released in 1974 by the Milton Bradley Company, with a total of eight editions produced through 1981. Beginning with the fourth edition, like its TV counterpart, the title and top payoff changed to The $20,000 Pyramid, while the final edition was titled The $50,000 Pyramid. However, due to concerns about players easily memorizing possible Winners' Circle subjects, the format of the board game's Winners' Circle endgame was changed to mirror that of the TV version's main game.

Cardinal Games released a new home version of The $25,000 Pyramid in 1986, this time using the actual Winners' Circle rules and format, which was also given to all contestants who appeared on both the daytime and nighttime versions for most of 1987 and select 1988 episodes. This version was reissued in 2000 by Endless Games, which later released a new edition based on the Osmond version in 2003.

The $100,000 Pyramid, a video game adaptation, was released in 1987. Developed and published by Box Office Software, it was originally released for Apple II and then ported to MS-DOS and Commodore 64. Sierra Attractions released a Microsoft Windows version of The $100,000 Pyramid in 2001, which was followed by a DVD game from MGA Entertainment in 2006.

A version titled The $1,000,000 Pyramid was released by Ubisoft for the Wii in 2011.

== Notes ==
Awards and achievements
Preceded by Hollywood Squares	Daytime Emmy Award for Outstanding Game/Audience Participation Show; 1976 as The $20,000 Pyramid	Succeeded by Family Feud
Preceded by Hollywood Squares	Daytime Emmy Award for Outstanding Game/Audience Participation Show; 1980–81 as The $20,000 Pyramid tie with Hollywood Squares in 1980	Succeeded by Password Plus
Preceded by Password Plus	Daytime Emmy Award for Outstanding Game/Audience Participation Show; 1983–87 as The $25,000 Pyramid	Succeeded by The Price Is Right
Preceded by The Price Is Right	Daytime Emmy Award for Outstanding Game/Audience Participation Show; 1989 as The $25,000 Pyramid	Succeeded by Jeopardy!
