= That's My Dog =

- Genre: Game show
- Created by: Derek Hobson; John Viner
- Written by: Andrew Golder; Robert Sherman; Elliot Feldman; Joel Klein
- Directed by: John Wolf; George Choderker
- Presented by: Steve Skrovan; Roxie Stice; Susan Pari; Wil Shriner
- Narrated by: Gene Wood; Dean Miuccio
- Composer: Scott V. Smith
- Country of origin: United States
- Original language: English

Production
- Executive producers: Albert Wallace; S. Harry Young; Robert Sherman
- Running time: approx. 22-26 minutes
- Production companies: Albert Wallace Enterprises; NorthStar Entertainment Group; Family Productions

Original release
- Network: The Family Channel
- Release: September 1, 1991 – September 30, 1995

That's My Dog is an American game show aired on The Family Channel from September 1, 1991 to September 30, 1995. It was based on a British show of the same name, produced by Television South West for the ITV network from 1984 to 1988, and presented by creator Derek Hobson.

Two families and their dogs competed for prizes in games and stunts oriented toward the dogs.

== Hosts and production notes ==
The host for the show's first two seasons was Steve Skrovan; he was replaced by Wil Shriner for the last two seasons.

Skrovan had two female co-hosts, Roxie Stice for the early season one episodes and Susan Pari for the later season one episodes and the second season, during his tenure on the show. In season three, Shriner hosted solo, but during the show's final season, he was accompanied by a bull mastiff named 'Tiny', who showed signs bearing the name of the second event, wore a referee jersey for the Doggie Bowl event and brought medals for the dogs at the end of the show.

The announcer for the early episodes of the first season was Gene Wood. During the later season one episodes and for the rest of the run, Dean Miuccio of WMGF-FM took over as announcer.

That's My Dog was filmed in Orlando, Florida. For the first season, the show was filmed outdoors near Residential Street at the Disney-MGM Studios backlot. For the second season, the show was filmed on Soundstage 23 at Universal Studios Florida. For the last two seasons, the show was filmed on Soundstage 2 at Disney-MGM Studios.

== Game play ==
Two teams of three (sometimes two) family members and their dogs competed in a series of events fit for the dogs. These included going through a maze, performing tasks, the dogs' masters answering dog-related questions and finally a standard dog obstacle course. After five events, the dog (and family) with the most points won a year's supply of dog food and prizes for the rest of the family.

=== Round One ===
The first round was usually a head-to-head competition played under a 60-second time limit. Usually, both dogs received points based on their performance, with the better-performing dog earning an additional ten points. For example, in one event, the dogs went down a line of doggy treats (on pie plates), and for each one eaten, they would get 2 points, with a 10-point bonus for the dog who could eat more of them faster. One notable exception was "Doggie Bag," in which the dogs and masters climbed into a large cloth bag and exchanged T-shirts; the team that first emerged from the bag within 60 seconds won 20 points.

During the show's first season, the round one competition was played for 20 points (10 if the race was half done).

=== Round Two ===
From then on, each dog played separately. In round 2, each dog had (usually) 30 seconds to perform a stunt for points. For instance, in one event, the dog had to bring slippers back to their master, picking up 5 points for each slipper brought back and 10 bonus points for each matching pair. Another event gave the dog 30 seconds to jump over a bunch of hurdles of varying heights, starting at one point for the lowest one, and six points for the highest. If a hurdle got knocked over, it was out of play.

==== Have a Ball (Skrovan Version) ====
In round two of the season one episodes, the dogs faced a tray of six balls. Their job was to fetch balls back to their masters. Each fetched ball was worth 5 points for a maximum of 30.

=== Round Three (Mixed-Up Maze) ===
The third round was known variously as the Mixed-Up Maze, the "Twisting, Turning, Tricky Trail" and various other terms. Each dog had 45 seconds (60 in the final season) to get from the starting gate to their master at the finish line (who, true to the theme of the show, would be waiting in a doghouse structure during the final season). Along the way, the dog might be distracted by a sand trap filled with dog food, a toy car, a water bowl and other things. A dog making it through would earn 20 points, with the faster dog getting 10 bonus points (only applicable if both dogs completed the run). If a dog left the maze at any point other than the regular exit by either jumping over the outer wall or escaping through the giant mouse holes on the middle of each outer wall, that dog would be disqualified for the event and score no points for the run (and in the final season, a 'Runaway Dog!' graphic would pop up on the screen and sirens would go off). However, jumping within the maze structure was acceptable.

During the early episodes of the first season, the maze was played first.

=== Canine Quiz Round (First Season) ===
During the show's first season, the dog's masters played the "Canine Quiz Round". Host Skrovan asked a series of six dog-related questions and the first player to buzz-in (also called 'barking in') was given a chance to answer. An incorrect answer from the bark-in player allowed an opponent to answer. Each correct answer was worth 5 points. Later on in the first season, the sixth and final question of the round was worth a special prize from the Doggy Bag.

=== Round Four ===
The fourth round had two different formats:

==== Talent Showcase ====
In the first three seasons, the "Talent Showcase", the dogs would perform a talent of some sort within a 30-second time limit, then a panel of three audience members would give the dog up to 30 points (10 from each panelist and in the last two seasons it would be as low as 0 from each panelist). After both dogs performed, the audience members won prizes.

Note: During the early episodes of the first season, the Talent Showcase was played second and was called "Tricks 'n' Treats."

==== Doggie Bowl ====
In the show's fourth and final season, the dogs and their masters went to the Doggie Bowl to play another game. Each dog would do a stunt much like in round 2, usually lasting 30 seconds, and would score points based on their performance.

=== Doggy Decathlon ===
The final round was the "Doggy Decathlon", an obstacle course. In the first season, the dog would have 60 seconds to complete 8 obstacles; in the second and third seasons, the number of obstacles was reduced to 7. In the final season, the dog would have 100 seconds to complete 10 obstacles. The course varied from week to week, but always (starting late 1992) ended with the dog leaping through the big letter "O" in the "That's My DOG" sign. Each completed obstacle earned 10 points; in the first season, a 20-point bonus was awarded if the dog completed all 8 obstacles within the time limit but during the second and third seasons, it was increased to a 30-point bonus if the dog completed all 7 obstacles before time ran out; in any case, a perfectly completed course would yield a total of 100 points. A dog could skip an obstacle, but jumping through the sign would always end the run, regardless of time remaining.

=== Winning ===
The team with the most points won the game. The winning family received prizes, while the winning dog won a year's supply of dog food (originally from Iams in the first season, later from Kibbles 'n' Bits for the last three seasons) and a gold medal. In some episodes where the final score was a tie, the dogs took turns wearing the medal; presumably, both dogs later received one. During the show's final season, there was a silver medal for the runner-up, and a gold one for the winner, both brought out by the show's resident dog Tiny.

=== Special Episodes ===
- Celebrity Dogs - celebrity dogs Rin Tin Tin (of Rin Tin Tin K-9 Cop) and Dryfuss (Bear from Empty Nest) competed, but they each came in with one master; they both played for charity.
- Christmas - in the fourth and final season, there was a Christmas themed show with appropriately themed events.
- Puppy Love - also in the final season of the show, there was a special Puppy Love episode aired where puppies did the events that adult dogs normally did. One of the puppies was actually only 10 days old (announced on the show), surprisingly enough. This turned out to be one of the lowest scoring games (before the Doggy Decathlon) in the history of the show, with both puppies struggling to reach double digits before the final event. It was likely the only time in the final season that both contestants failed to finish the decathlon before time expired (the closer one still had several obstacles to go when time ran out).

== Critical reception ==
Catherine Hinman of the Orlando Sentinel gave the show a mixed review, writing that "the contest is less entertaining than the outrageous concept. In fact, no one seems to care who wins."
