= National Intelligence Priorities Framework =

The National Intelligence Priorities Framework, or NIPF, is an unclassified national intelligence document used by the top planners of the United States Intelligence Community, such as the President of the United States and the Director of National Intelligence (DNI), that summarizes the United States's intelligence gathering priorities.

The document was first put in use in 2003, but newer versions have been written.

== Targets ==
Included in the NIPF's are the NSA's foreign surveillance priorities. The top targets currently include China, Russia, Iran, Pakistan, and Afghanistan, but there are many other countries on the list as well as Intergovernmental organizations, such as the European Union, the United Nations, and the International Atomic Energy Agency.

== See also ==
- Mark M. Lowenthal
