= Roger De Courcey =

British ventriloquist

- Born: London, England
- Occupations: British ventriloquist, actor, writer

Roger De Courcey is a British ventriloquist and artists' agent, best known for performing with Nookie Bear. He was the winner of the 1976 New Faces televised talent competition grand final.

== Biography ==
De Courcey has performed on the West End stage, in productions of musicals Sweet Charity, Two Cities and Company. He has appeared at the London Palladium many times including the 1976 Royal Variety Performance.

In 1978 he released 'Nookie's Song', on the Pye Records Label.

A freemason, he is a member of Chelsea Lodge No. 3098, the membership of which is made up of entertainers. De Courcey is also a member and former "King Rat" of the Grand Order of Water Rats which is the oldest theatrical fraternity in the world. De Courcey is also an agent, and represented musician Rick Wakeman.

His son is the actor Jamie de Courcey.

De Courcey is a fan of Crystal Palace Football Club.
