= Marti Caine =

English comedian and singer (1945–1995)

- Born: Lynne Denise Shepherd; 26 January 1945; Sheffield, England
- Died: 4 November 1995 (aged 50); Henley-on-Thames, England
- Occupations: Comedian; actress; singer; dancer; presenter; writer
- Years active: 1975–1995
- Known for: Winner and presenter of New Faces
- Height: 5 ft 7 in (170 cm)
- Spouse(s): Malcolm Stringer (1962–1979); Kenneth Ives (1984–1995)

Marti Caine, born Lynne Denise Shepherd (26 January 1945 – 4 November 1995), was an English comedienne, actress, dancer, presenter, singer, and writer, who first came to national attention by winning the television talent show New Faces in 1975, and went on to become a variety star on shows including the self-titled Marti Caine (1979–84), and as host of the revived New Faces (1986–88).

== Early life ==
Caine was born Lynne Denise Shepherd in Sheffield. During her childhood, her father died from cancer and she suffered sexual abuse from her paternal grandfather. Her mother had a history of alcoholism and drug abuse.

At the age of 17, she married Malcolm Stringer, a local butcher's boy, and became in her own words "just another starry-eyed wannabe... married with two babies, an ex-beauty queen, stuck on a council estate, with little hope of fulfilling any dreams for a better life."

At age 19, and unable to pay the £19 cost of her mother's funeral expenses, she auditioned as Lynne Stringer at the Working Men's Club in Chapeltown, near Sheffield. This resulted in a three-week stint singing under the name Sunny Smith, followed by a spell as Zoe Bond. Her husband Malcolm Stringer chose her eventual stage name from a gardening book, though Marta Cane (tomato cane) was misspelled at an early gig and 'Marti Caine' remained with her.

== Professional success ==
After working for many years on the club circuit in Yorkshire as a stand-up comic and cabaret singer, Caine gained national prominence when she appeared on the ATV talent show New Faces in 1975. She won that year's competition, defeating both Lenny Henry and Victoria Wood.

She made more television appearances including the self-titled Marti Caine on BBC2; showcasing her dance, comedic and musical talents. Her seventeen-year marriage broke down in 1978, making front-page headlines in the national press. The couple had two sons, Lee and Max. She married again eight years later, to the television director Kenneth Ives.

During the 1980s, Caine returned to New Faces as its compère, reviving the show into a ratings winner and leading to her catchphrase "press your buttons now!".

Caine led a UK tour of the musical production Funny Girl. She starred in the BBC sitcom Hilary (1984), which was written specifically for her. The series ran until 1986. Also in 1986, she performed a one-woman show at London's Donmar Warehouse, co-writing fourteen songs about her life experiences.

She was the subject of This Is Your Life twice.

== Music career ==
Caine recorded five albums, also working with Karl Jenkins who wrote the signature tune "Quiet Please, The Lady's Gonna Sing" using the theme from Sibelius's 5th Symphony. This was her third album, and her second with Jenkins, following the album Behind the Smile. The sweeping, theatrical delivery of this title track contrasts with the easy, fluid style with which she approaches "Ebony Eyes" on the same album. However, her persona as cabaret host and comedian seemed to prevent any serious inroads into commercial musical success – though her recordings were marketed globally, in areas as far-flung as Scandinavia, South America and Australasia – with huge numbers bought by television audiences.

Caine's first album was so popular that it was re-released three times, with different covers, under two separate record labels. Her posthumous CD, released in 1996, was compiled from her BBC Radio shows, her musical director noting that "I was working with, arguably, 'the best female singer around' but who was, unfortunately, always thought of, first and foremost, as a comedienne".

Caine's mid-career decision to play Sun City in South Africa during the years of apartheid was seen as a serious error of judgement by many (and as a result she was put on a United Nations blacklist of artists who had ignored a cultural boycott of South Africa). To counter its cultural isolation, the apartheid era South African entertainment industry had offered artists astronomical fees, according to press reports from the time and entertainment industry sources. "It's a question of conscience," said Harry Belafonte, co-chairman (with Arthur Ashe) of Artists United Against Apartheid. However, Caine spoke of her support for and work with the "black community". She claimed she enjoyed black music and had recorded a number of Stevie Wonder songs. She also dedicated a medley as a Tribute to Gladys Knight on her first studio LP.

== Death ==
Caine developed lymphatic cancer and died in 1995 at Henley-on-Thames. She had spent the last years of her life campaigning on behalf of cancer charities (the proceeds from her last album going directly to the Marti Caine Children with Leukaemia Trust).

Five years before her death, her autobiography A Coward's Chronicles was a best seller in 1990. It was praised by The Independent as being "an intelligently written and brutally honest account of her extraordinary life story". She titled her autobiography A Coward's Chronicles to counteract the tabloid image of her as a paragon of courage and defiance. "You fight for dear life", she said, "because you are too coward to embrace death".

Caine was an admirer of modern art, and Mick Farrell's sculpture Sheen is dedicated to her. The sculpture, frequently referred to as Marti, is situated in Arundel Gate outside Sheffield Hallam University who commissioned it. The sculpture was to have been unveiled by Caine, but she died two weeks before the scheduled unveiling. In the same year, the university awarded her an honorary doctorate in recognition of her life achievements and her contribution to the world of entertainment.

== References in popular culture ==
The film Funny Cow, starring Maxine Peake as a troubled northern comedienne, was inspired by the life of Marti Caine.

In the comedy series Mandy, episode "SpaceMandy" (Series 2 Episode 4), the space-themed dance sequence is credited as having been inspired by Caine.

== Videos ==
- Wild World: Marti's duet with Tony Christie
- Honky Tonk Woman: Typically flamboyant dance sequence from TV show
- The Biggest Aspidistra in the World: Marti singing a music hall comedy number in tribute to Gracie Fields
- I've Never Been to Me: Montage sequence accompanying Marti's 1978 single
- Regina Fong Gala 2008: Drag queen Mrs Moore impersonating Marti's New Faces persona

=== VHS ===
- Joe Longthorne: The Ultimate Collection (1997) [Duet with Marti on "I'll Never Love This Way Again"]
- The Very Best of Joe Longthorne: Volume II (1992) [Duet with Marti on "I'll Never Love This Way Again"]

== Awards and achievements ==
- Heritage Foundation Plaque, BBC TV Centre, London (2001)
- The Marti Caine Fund, set up to support the Children with Leukaemia Trust (1996)
- Honorary Doctorate, Sheffield Hallam University (1995)
- Sheen, sculpture by Mick Farrell dedicated to Marti (1995)
- Woman of the week, Woman magazine (1986)
- Star Award, Funniest Lady, Swap Shop (1979)
- Winner, New Faces (1975)

== Discography ==
=== Albums ===
- Nobody Does It Like Marti (LP, 1976)
- Behind the Smile (LP, 1978) [Produced by Karl Jenkins]
- The Lady's Gonna Sing (LP, 1979) [Co-produced by Karl Jenkins]
- Point of View (LP, 1981)
- Marti (CD, 1996) [Concert recordings with the Ronnie Hazlehurst orchestra]

=== Singles ===
- "Can I Speak to the World, Please?" / "Tin Heart and the Rebel" (1982)
- "I'll Never See You Again" / "Bitch is Love" (1981)
- "One More Night" / "What's the Weather Like Outside?" (1979)
- "I've Never Been to Me" / "You" (1978)
- "Woman in Your Arms" / "Let Go" (1977)
- "Momma's Song" / "Nobody Does It Like Me" (1975)

=== Compilations and re-releases ===
- LateNightTales presents After Dark (compilation CD, 2013) (features 1982 track "Love the Way You Love Me")
- You Are Awful... But We Like You! (compilation CD, 2000) (features 1978 single "I've Never Been To Me")
- Sweet Inspiration (audio book, cassette, 1994) [interview with Alan Titchmarsh]
- Disconet Vol 4:7 (compilation LP, 1981) (features 1981 single "Can I Speak to the World, Please?")
- Nobody Does It Like Me (LP & cassette, 1979) [third re-release of 1976 debut album]
- Nobody Does It Like Marti Caine (LP, 1977) [second re-release of 1976 debut album]

== Bibliography ==
- Autobiography: A Coward's Chronicles
