= The Pyramid Game =

British game show

- Genre: Game show
- Created by: Bob Stewart
- Presented by: Steve Jones (ITV); Donny Osmond (Challenge)
- Country of origin: United Kingdom
- Original language: English
- No. of series: 3 (LWT); 2 (TVS); 1 (Challenge)
- No. of episodes: 46 (LWT); 80 (TVS); 30 (Challenge)

Production
- Running time: 30 minutes (inc. adverts)
- Production companies: LWT in association with Bob Stewart Productions and Philip Hindin (1981–84); TVS in association with Talbot Television (1989–90); Sony Pictures Television International (2007)

Original release
- Network: ITV
- Release: 5 September 1981 – 18 August 1984
- Release: 9 January 1989 – 6 April 1990
- Network: Challenge
- Release: 7 May – 15 June 2007

Related
- Pyramid (US version)

The (£1,000) Pyramid Game is a United Kingdom game show based on the American format of the same name that was originally shown on ITV from 1981 to 1984 then 1989 to 1990 hosted by Steve Jones, then revived by Challenge in 2007 hosted by Donny Osmond (who had also hosted the American version).

The show first appeared in 1978 as a segment of Bruce Forsyth's Big Night, then was a segment on The Steve Jones Games Show in 1979, before becoming a series in its own right in 1981.

== Format ==
=== Front game ===
The Pyramid's game boards, both in the main game and in the Winner's Circle bonus round, featured six categories arranged in a pyramid, with three categories on the bottom row, two on the middle row, and one on the top. In the main game, a category's position on the board was not an indicator of its difficulty. In the Winner's Circle, categories became progressively more difficult the higher they were on the board.

The game featured two teams, each composed of a celebrity and a "civilian" contestant. At the beginning of the game, the teams were shown six categories, whose titles gave vague clues to their possible meaning (e.g., "I'm All Wet" might pertain to things found in the water). Once the category was chosen, its exact meaning was given. For up to 30 seconds, one player would convey to the other clues to a series of seven items belonging to a category. One point was scored for each item correctly guessed. If a word was passed, the giver could not go back to that word, but if the receiver knew the word later on and guessed it, the team still earned a point.

Using any part of the answer in giving a clue resulting in the item being disqualified with a "honk" sound effect. The celebrity gave the clues in the first round and the contestant gave the clues in the second round. The teams alternated choosing subjects in the first two rounds. If the game hadn't been won yet the teams then chose which member would give the clues in the third round with the lower scoring team going first.

A team won the game when either: it was impossible for their opponents to surpass their score, or by having the higher score after three rounds. In 1978, two rounds (four categories) were played and the losing player earned £10 per point. From 1982 to 1984, all six categories would be played and both players earned £10 per point.

If there was a tie score at the end of the third round, a tie breaking round was played. The team which had just played its third round and had thus created the tie was given a choice between two categories, all answers of each of which began with a certain letter of the alphabet. The other team would then select whichever letter the first team did not pick. The objective was to score as many words as possible within 30 seconds, and the team with the higher score won. If they were tied, then it was the team with the faster time.

Behind one of the subjects in each game was hidden a Lucky 7 symbol (replaced with a 'Mystery 7' symbol during the Osmond run). If the team that chose it got all seven correct within the time, the contestant would win a bonus prize.

=== Winner's Circle ===
The Winner's Circle included a larger pyramid, also composed of six boxes. Each box contained a category, such as "Things You Plan" or "Why You Exercise", and would be revealed one at a time. One player (usually the celebrity, though the contestant always had the option to give or receive) gave a list of items to the other player, who attempted to guess the category to which all of the described items belonged. Each category was worth a small amount of money. Except on The Pyramid Game from 1989–1990, correctly guessing all six categories in 60 seconds earned the cash bonus. In 1978, the player would be guaranteed £10 times his or her earlier score.

An illegal clue would disqualify the category and end the player's chance to win the large bonus. However, if other categories remained in the game, the smaller amounts could still be won and play would continue until time ran out or until all the remaining categories had been guessed. Illegal clues included giving a clue that was "the essence of the category" (i.e., the category itself or a direct synonym), describing the category itself rather than listing or naming items, clues that did not fit the category and made-up expressions.

Each category on the Pyramid paid as follows:

Version	1st	2nd	3rd	4th	5th	6th
The £1,000 Pyramid	£50			£100		£200
The Pyramid Game	£25			£50		£100
Donny's Pyramid Game	£50	£75	£100	£125	£150	£250

The cash bonus format for a successful trip to the Winner's Circle varied on different versions of the show. On The £1,000 Pyramid, completing all six categories awarded £1,000. On The Pyramid Game, each trip to the winning area could be worth up to £275. On the 2007 Pyramid Game the first trip to the Winner's Circle was worth £1,000. If that was won, and the same player won the second game, the Winner's Circle was worth £2,000. Otherwise, the second Winner's Circle was worth £1,000 for both players.

During the early 1980s, a contestant who won two games retired undefeated. In 1989, the winner of each game returned to face another opponent but could only play up to three games and win a maximum possible total of £825. In 1990, the winner of the most money would return to play again, albeit for a maximum of three programmes, with a maximum possible winnings of £1,650. On Pyramid Game in 2007, assuming both games are won each time, a player could return for up to five shows, for maximum possible winnings of £15,000.

== Transmissions ==
=== LWT era ===
Series	Start date	End date	Episodes
1	5 September 1981	5 December 1981	14
2	11 September 1982	26 December 1982	16
3	27 April 1984	18 August 1984	16

=== TVS era ===
Series	Start date	End date	Episodes
1	9 January 1989	10 March 1989	45
2	19 February 1990	6 April 1990	35

=== Challenge era ===
Series	Start date	End date	Episodes
1	7 May 2007	15 June 2007	30
