= Terry St Clair =

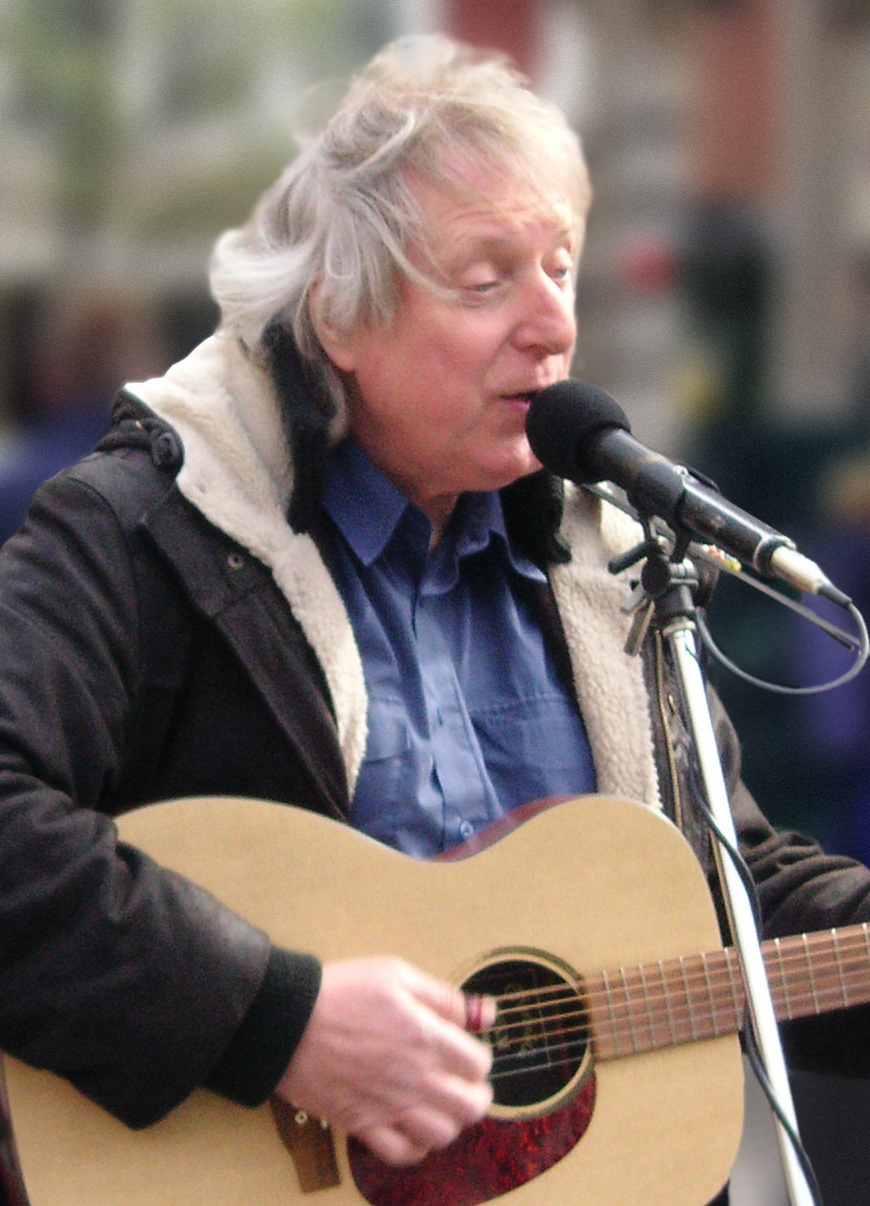
St Clair in 2008

Terry St Clair is a British folk musician, guitarist and composer.

== Background ==
St Clair was born in Burslem, Staffordshire, England. As a child, he demonstrated his desire to become a musician. He would try to play anything that could produce a tune.

St Clair and his family moved to Hinckley, Leicestershire in 1953. His parents encouraged his love of music, arranging for piano lessons at the age of nine. He also practised his singing skills as a member of the local church choir, where he also played the church organ.

It was at a school concert that he heard older pupil Geoffrey Richardson (later joining progressive rock group Caravan) performing the folk blues of Bert Jansch and Jackson C. Frank, inspiring St. Clair to take up the guitar. His first guitar was home-made, and hardly stayed in tune.

Whilst working at the local printers W. Pickering and Sons. he and friends Pete Thomas and Mervin Wallace took over the running of the Bar W Folk Club in Barwell.

== Early career ==
After he left school, worked as an apprentice book-binder, enrolling at the Matthew Bolton College in Birmingham. During this five-year period he spent most of his time playing guitar and singing in local folk clubs. St Clair started to write songs during this period. The first being "You Don't Need Me", written for a friend who used heroin and died in 1993. "You Don't Need Me" was not recorded until 1994, on Basically.

In 1968 St Clair met Toni Savage. Savage was a local folk club organiser and agent. He ran a private press from his workshop in Leicester, where he printed and published material for Spike Milligan among others. Savage supported St Clair's career, and booked him into folk clubs and concerts around the country. St Clair's television debut was on ITV's New Faces on his birthday in 1974, singing one of his own songs, "So Many Empty Mornings'". That same year he headed south for London and a professional life as a singer-songwriter, playing in wine bars and restaurants.

In 1977 St Clair moved back to the Midlands, got married, and had a daughter Anna (born 1978). He also took a job as a sales representative with a record distributor. During this period he formed a folk-rock band called Millstone Bill with old friend Steve Southorn; they played pub and club venues around the Midlands. St Clair was still writing songs and the band performed most of the material.

== 1980 to present ==
St Clair's marriage broke up in 1980, and he moved back to London, first working as a driving instructor where in 1981 he met his wife and St Clair now says he has two daughters.

Between 1982 and 1984 St Clair travelled extensively around Europe. Initially by hitch-hiking to France, Italy and Greece. St Clair set up home in North London; by this time being booked to play in Italy, the Netherlands and the Republic of Ireland as well as all over the UK.

Street Theatre became popular and St Clair enjoyed this freedom to perform in towns and cities throughout Europe. It was during this period that he performed alongside comedians such as Eddie Izzard, Sarah Crow and Ann Bryson (then known as the Flaming Hamsters). Not between Two and Five St Clair's first album came out in 1985. Financed by businessman Nelson King; recorded and produced by Bob Lamb at his studio at Kings Heath, Birmingham, it has now sold well in excess of 60,000 copies. Keyboards and arrangement were by Phil Johnstone.

St Clair continued to write songs and perform throughout the 1980s, gaining bigger audiences. He played at a Barry Manilow concert at Blenheim Palace, and in 1988 St Clair performed to 5,000 people at the Festival of Voices in the Wembley Conference Centre.

His second album, From the Little Back Room was released in 1991, having taken eighteen months to record. The production and arrangements using electronic sequencing and samples were all completed by St Clair. In 1994 St Clair recorded Basically... Terry St. Clair, his first completely acoustic album. In 1997 St Clair was approached by an American record label, to record a new album in New York City, although the deal ultimately fell through. At this time st Clair performed in the United States for the first time. St Clair was introduced to music journalist John Tobler by Dave Cousins of the Strawbs.

St Clair's next release, Black White was recorded and released on his own label, having been recorded at the Denton Studios in Chiswick.

St Clair's composition "Different World" was used in the soundtrack to the film Iffy; whilst "If I Fall in Love with You" was in the Mike Binder film, The Upside of Anger (2005), starring Kevin Costner. In January 2011 Terry released his fifth album titled Hard Times and other Riddles. It is a collection of contemporary and traditional folk song.

Terry continues to write music and performs throughout the United Kingdom and Europe.

In November 2018 Terry St.Clair was nominated as an elected trustee and director of the Covent Garden Area Trust.

== Discography ==
- 1985: Not Between Two and Five
- 1991: From the Little Back Room
- 1994: Basically... Terry St. Clair
- 1997: Black White
- 2011: Hard Times and other Riddles
- 2020: Cobbles & Stages
