= New Faces =

British TV talent show 1973–1988

- Also known as: New Faces of... (1986–88)
- Genre: Talent show
- Presented by: Leslie Crowther (Regional pilot); Derek Hobson (ATV); Marti Caine (Central)
- Theme music composer: Ed Welch
- Country of origin: United Kingdom
- Original language: English
- No. of series: 6 (ATV); 3 (Central)
- No. of episodes: 166 (ATV); 39 (Central)

Production
- Production locations: ATV Centre (ATV); Birmingham Hippodrome (Central)
- Running time: 60 minutes (inc. adverts)
- Production companies: ATV (1973–78); Central (1986–88)

Original release
- Network: ITV
- Release: 31 May 1973 – 3 December 1988

Related
- Opportunity Knocks

New Faces is a British television talent show that aired in the 1970s and 1980s. It has been hosted by Leslie Crowther, Derek Hobson and Marti Caine. It was produced for the ITV network by ATV, and later by Central.

== Original series: 1973–1978 ==
The show first aired as a pilot on the ATV network on 31 May 1973 with host Leslie Crowther and a judging panel consisting of Noele Gordon, Tony Hatch, Clive James and John Smith assessing performances from ten acts looking for a break in show business. Welsh singer Jennifer Jones won the show that also featured a man who blew up a hot water bottle until it burst followed by a few choruses of "Spanish Eyes".

A further pilot aired on 7 July 1973 with new host Derek Hobson and a full series followed from 29 September 1973 to 2 April 1978. It was recorded at the ATV Centre in Birmingham. The show's theme tune, "You're a Star!", was performed by singer Carl Wayne, formerly of The Move, and it was eventually released, becoming a minor hit.

Winners went on to have careers in television entertainment, such as Lenny Henry. Many top entertainers began their careers with a performance on this programme. The acts were evaluated by a panel of experts, including Tony Hatch, Mickie Most, Clifford Davis, Arthur Askey, Ted Ray, Ed Stewart, Jack Parnell, Alan A. Freeman, Muriel Young, Lonnie Donegan, Lionel Blair, Ingrid Pitt, Shaw Taylor, Terry Wogan and Noel Edmonds.

Four judges would make up the panel each week. Contestants received marks out of ten from the four judges in three categories such as "presentation", "content" and "star quality" – the "star quality" category was later replaced by "entertainment value". The highest score any act could attain was thus 120 points. Patti Boulaye was the only act who ever attained the maximum mark, doing so in the programme's final season. Les Dennis received 119 points, with only Tony Hatch giving him less than a perfect "10" for presentation. Arthur Askey was on the same panel and started singing "Tony is a spoilsport" when Hatch awarded Dennis 9 as his final score.

=== Series 1–6 Winners ===
Series	Date	Artist(s)	Act
Pilot	7 July 1973	Trevor Chance	Vocalist (in the style of Jack Jones)
1	29 December 1973	Tom Waite	Vocalist
2	6 July 1974	Aiden J. Harvey	Impressionist
3	27 July 1975	Marti Caine	Comedian
4	31 July 1976	Roger De Courcey	Ventriloquist
5	2 April 1977	Koffee 'n' Kreme	Vocal duo
6	2 April 1978	Patti Boulaye	Vocalist

=== Series One Final (1973) ===
Key	Winner	Runner-up	Third place

Order	Score	Artist(s)	Act
1	257	Tom Waite	Vocalist
2	250	Showaddywaddy	Eight-piece group
3	233	Jackie Carlton	Comedian
4	217	Jean De Both	Vocalist
5	215	John D. Bryant	Guitar/vocalist
6	213	Charlie James	Female vocalist
7	205	Ricki Disoni	Vocalist
8	203	Yakity Yak	Four-piece group
9	185	Anthony Waters	Actor/vocalist
10	184	George Huxley's Dixieland Jazz Band	six-piece jazz band
11	176	Dri Jinja	Folk trio
12	171	Elaine Simmons	Vocalist
13	143	Trotto	Folk trio

=== Series Two Final (1974) ===
Key	Winner	Runner-up	Third place

Order	Score	Artist(s)	Act
1	396	Aiden J. Harvey	Impressionist
2	353	Nicky Martyn	Comedian
3	337	Michelle Fisher	Vocalist
4	333	Art Nouveau	Group
5=	327	Susan Cope	Vocal / Piano
5=	327	Jeffrey Hooper	Vocalist
7	322	Johnny Carroll	Comedian
8	312	The Cosmopolitans	Vocal Trio
9	306	Sweet Sensation	Group
10	301	Nicola Christie	Vocalist
11	300	Tony Gerrard	Comedian
12	234	Jimmy Lister	Comedian / Impressionist

=== Series Three Final (1975) ===
Key	Winner	Runner-up	Third place

Order	Score	Artist(s)	Act
1	539	Marti Caine	Comedian
2	538	Al Dean	Comedian
3	528	Ofanchi	six-piece group
4	478	Lenny Henry	Impressionist
5	475	Mike Felix	Comedy/vocalist
6	472	Tony Maiden	Impressionist
7	441	20th Century Steel Sound	Nine-piece group
8	431	Toby	Six-piece group

=== Series Five Final (1977) ===
Key	Winner	Runner-up	Third place

Order	Score	Artist(s)	Act
1	369	Koffee 'n' Kreme	Vocal Duo
2	363	Bryan Taylor	Vocalist
3	341	Simone	Vocalist
4	338	Kite	Three-piece group
5=	337	Mike 'Stand' Douglas	Comedian
5=	337	The Bob Clarke Ensemble	Jazz trio
7	333	Peter Collins with Style	Group
8	319	Mr Carline & Mr Walling	Comedy duo

=== Series Six Final (1978) ===
Key	Winner	Runner-up	Third place

Order	Score	Artist(s)	Act
1	565	Patti Boulaye	Vocalist
2	554	Stella Starr	Vocalist
3	543	Kirk St. James	Vocalist
4	534	Pat O'Hare	Vocalist
5	530	Civvy Street	Five-piece group
6	524	Mike Johnson	Jazz guitarist
7	522	Alan J. Bartley	Comedian
8	509	Poacher	Six-piece country group
9	498	Bazz Harris	Comedian

== Revived version ==
The series was revived by Central for three series between 1986 and 1988, presented by past winner Marti Caine. Her catchphrase was bellowed at the voting studio audience: "Press your buttons... NOW!". The show also featured a panel of experts including the journalist Nina Myskow, who often made critical comments. In this incarnation, the home audience decided who won by sending in postcards (phone voting was soon introduced by BBC rival Bob Says Opportunity Knocks), though, the audience did vote for its favourite act using a gigantic lightboard known as Spaghetti Junction lighting up to a varying degree as they pushed their buttons.

=== 1986 final ===
Key	Winner	Runner-up	Third place

Order	Finished	Artist(s)	Act
1	1st overall in panellists' vote	Duggie Small	Comedian
2	7 points	Walker & Cadman	Comedians
3	5 points	Billy Pearce	Comedian
4	0 points	Wayne Denton	Club singer
5	22 points	Julie A. Scott	Soprano
6	56 points (public phone-in winner)	Gary Lovini	17-year-old violinist
7	43 points	James Stone	Soul singer
8		Pauline Hannah	Impressionist
9		Freddy Philips	Singer/comedian
10		Scott Randele	
11		Maggie Dee	
12		High Jinks	

Note: The James Stone who appeared in this final is the same one who appeared in the Britain's Got Talent semi-finals of 2008.

=== 1987 final ===
Key	Winner	Runner-up	Third place

Order	Finished	Artist(s)	Act(s)
1	94 points	Jimmy Tamley	Ventriloquist
2	92 points	Joe Pasquale	Comedian
3	70 points	Brothers Demented	
4	32 points	Mike Sterling	Musical theatre-style singer
5	26 points	Richard Courtice	Tenor vocalist
6	10 points	Billy Jones	Rock 'n' roll singer/guitarist
7		Lea Cassell	Impressionist
8		Derek Barron	Pianist/organist
9		Paul Duffy	Saxophonist
10		Denny Waters	Comedian
11		Barbara Allan	Vocalist
12		Stiles and Drewe	Singing duo

=== 1988 final ===
The 1988 final took place at the Birmingham Hippodrome Theatre on Saturday 3 December 1988 and was hosted by the 1975 winner Marti Caine.

Key	Winner	Runner-up	Third place

Performance Order	Finished	Artist(s)	Act(s)
12	118 points	Stephen Lee Garden	Musical theatre-style singer
11	102 points	Steve Womack	Comedian
9	80 points	Donimo	Comedy Mime
2	54 points	Stevie Riks	Impressionist
4	6 points	Tim Murray	Vocalist
1		Max Bacon	Vocalist
3		The Mad Hatters	Comedy Group
5		Steve Tandy	Comedian
6		Janice Watson	Soprano Vocalist
7		The Brothers Condo	Comedy Group
8		T.J. King	Vocalist
10		Louisa Shaw	Vocalist

Note: Vocalist Tim Murray is the son of 1950s singer Ruby Murray.

== Famous winners and contestants ==
- Jeffrey Hooper – Appeared in the Grand Final of series two in July 1974.
- Marti Caine - Series three winner in July 1975.
- Lenny Henry – Multiple wins in 1975.
- Michael Barrymore
- Joe Pasquale – 2nd in 1987. Pasquale won his heat but he came second in the final.
- Roy Walker
- The Chuckle Brothers – Appeared under the names Paul and Barry Harman in 1974.
- Malandra Burrows – Appeared in the first All Winners Final in November 1974 and was the youngest heat winner at nine years old.
- Carline and Walling
- Nick Van Eede - Appeared in band Twice Bitten. Would later have huge success with Cutting Crew with his song (I Just) Died In Your Arms in 1986 & 1987
- Victoria Wood - Appeared in the first All Winners Final in November 1974.
- Terry St. Clair – Appeared on series two in June 1974.
- Roger De Courcey and Nookie Bear – Winners of the 1976 Grand Final.
- Nicol and Marsh's Easy Street – Runners-up in 1976.
- Mick Miller
- Les Dennis - Appeared in series one, two and twice in series three making the All Winners Final in November 1974.
- Showaddywaddy - Runners-up in the Grand Final of series one in December 1973.
- Jim Davidson
- Gary Wilmot and Judy McPhee
- Billy Pearce
- Aiden J. Harvey - Winner of series two.
- Patti Boulaye – Appeared in the last 1970s edition of the show and was the only contestant ever to receive the maximum 120 points.
- Stevie Riks – Highest scoring contestant ever on the show.
- Max Bacon – later of GTR
- Sweet Sensation – From Manchester and fronted by 15-year-old Marcel King went on to become the first black British born soul band to hit the number spot in UK charts in September 1974 with hit record 'Sad Sweet Dreamer'.
- Andy Cameron
- Sheer Elegance – Pop trio who went on to have two hit singles in 1976.
- Lance Ellington – 1977 winner sang with the late Bet Hannah as singing duo Koffee 'n' Kreme.
- Roy 'Chubby' Brown – 10 December 1977.
- Paul Zenon - 21 November 1986.
- Bonnie Tyler - Appeared with her group Imagination in Series Two
- Our Kid - Won an edition in May 1976 and scored a number two hit single on the UK Singles Chart with "You Just Might See Me Cry".

== Other winners and contestants ==
- Penny Black – Extremely popular female-fronted five-piece band from Walsall. Appeared 4 December 1976 opening the show performing Kiki Dee's "I Got the Music in Me". Penny Black's TV lineup included Tiki Jones (vocals), Barry Underhill (Bass guitar & vocals), Rob Wood (Lead guitar and vocals), Roger Hayward (Hammond organ & vocals), and John Perkins (Drums). An EP was recorded to coincide with the New Faces TV appearance. Penny Black performed with various personnel changes with Underhill an ever present from 1974 until 1989 when they changed their name to PARIS and introduced a revamped modern 'romantics' image initiated by their latest female vocalist, Paula Tuckley. Penny Black/PARIS performed around the UK heavily throughout the 1970s and 1980s establishing a strong fan base. They recorded "Inside These 4 Walls" written by Underhill/Wood in 1982, with "Teenager in Love" on the B-side, before disbanding in late 1991, however, Underhill & Wood continued as a duo until 2000. PARIS reformed in July 2012 with the original band members to perform a 'One Night Only' Charity gig in November that year, however the gig was so successful they decided to carry on performing, until Underhill left the band in early 2014 and PARIS finally disbanded shortly afterwards.

- The Glentones – 18 piece high school big band playing music from the Glenn Miller era.
- Charlie James – Female singer – Heat winner, December 1973.
- Mike McCabe – Comedian.
- Bokkle Green – Pop music duo from Wolverhampton performing a song written by member Kevin Clark on the 24.11.73 episode. Kevin went on to become a successful musician, songwriter & record producer ("Crush" by Jennifer Paige).
- Martin Berger
- Al Brown – Comedian and father of television personality Claire Sweeney.
- Pete Hartley – Won audience vote in 1987.
- Pete Price
- Dave Curtis – Vocalist.
- Son of a Gun – Won in 1975 with 111 points beating Paul Shane. They did a number of TV shows and were signed to RCA. They lost to Al Dean in the All Winners Final, which also featured Lenny Henry.
- Sparrow
- M3 – Three sisters, Marilyn, Mary and Maureen Stevens.
- Walker and Cadman
- Professor Steve Green – Pianist and doctor.
- Dragon's Playground – Band.
- David Gold – Vocalist.
- Jimmy Tamley – Beat Joe Pasquale.
- Crick's Canine Wonders
- Darren Stuart
- Frank Leyton
- Frank Yonco and Kit Connor
- The Mad Hatters
- Rabbit – Cabaret band.
- Sandra Christie – Voice of Edith Piaf.
- The Libra Brothers. Three-piece band from Barnsley – members were Frank Cawthrow, Charlie Foster and Gordon Scholey.
- Rod and Mark Lyons – Father and son ventriloquist duo who had a minor hit single in Germany with the Neil Sedaka song "Oh, Carol!".
- Ground Pepper – Band. Song – Draculamania 1 March 1975 series 3 episode 24
- Pyramid - comedy showgroup from Gateshead – Steve Laidlaw, Allen Meche and Brian Pick.
- Colin "fingers" Henry
- Inter-City Union six-piece Soul/Funk group from London.

- The comedy character John Shuttleworth is managed by "Ken Worthington", a fictional Clarinet player and fictional New Faces runner-up. Worthington's voice is provided by actor Graham Fellows.

== Transmissions ==
=== ATV ===
Series	Start date	Final date	Episodes
Pilots	31 May 1973	7 July 1973	2
1	29 September 1973	29 December 1973	14
2	6 April 1974	6 July 1974	13
3	21 September 1974	27 July 1975	44
4	20 December 1975	31 July 1976	33
5	11 September 1976	2 April 1977	30
6	10 September 1977	2 April 1978	30

Series 3 was not fully broadcast on Scottish Television, with episodes not being broadcast during the weekends, which resulted in their votes not being counted. Episodes were instead broadcast on a Thursday evening between December 1974 and July 1975.

=== Central ===
Series	Start date	Final date	Episodes
1	19 September 1986	13 December 1986	13
2	4 September 1987	28 November 1987	13
3	10 September 1988	3 December 1988	13
