= Mark Lowenthal =

American author and academic

Mark M. Lowenthal
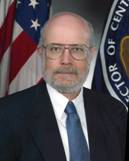
- Lowenthal's Government Executive portrait
- Born: September 5, 1948 (age 78); United States
- Education: Brooklyn College (BA); Harvard University (PhD)
- Occupation: National Security Expert
- Title: Former Assistant Director of Central Intelligence for Analysis & Production
- Successor: Mark Roth

Mark M. Lowenthal (born September 5, 1948) is an author and adjunct professor at the Nitze School for Advanced International Studies at Johns Hopkins University in Washington, DC. He has written five books and over 90 articles or studies on intelligence and national security. His book Intelligence: From Secrets to Policy has become a standard undergraduate and graduate text.

In 2005, Lowenthal retired from a career working with the United States Intelligence Community and a recognized national security affairs expert. Upon his retirement, he was commended for his work and commitment to the intelligence community by New Jersey Congressman Rush D. Holt Jr., in the U.S. House of Representatives.

He is the former Assistant Director of Central Intelligence for Analysis and Production and former Vice Chairman for Evaluation on the National Intelligence Council. He has also served in the U.S. State Department's Bureau of Intelligence and Research (INR), as both an office director and as a Deputy Assistant Secretary of State.

Lowenthal is a notable contestant on the American game show Jeopardy!, appearing five times, including winning the "Tournament of Champions" in 1988. In 1992, he co-wrote Secrets of the Jeopardy Champions, which was marketed as an instruction manual for prospective contestants of the trivia game show.

== Personal background ==
Lowenthal is married to Cynthia Lowenthal. Together, they have two children, Sarah and Adam. The family resides in Reston, Virginia, outside of Washington, D.C.

== Professional background ==
=== United States intelligence ===
In 1995, Lowenthal served as the staff director of the House Permanent Select Committee on Intelligence. In this capacity, he directed the committee's study on the future of the Intelligence Community, "IC21: The Intelligence Community in the 21st Century". Lowenthal was the Senior Specialist in U.S. Foreign Policy at the Congressional Research Service, Library of Congress.

In 2002, Lowenthal began serving as the CIA's Assistant Director of Central Intelligence for Analysis and Production (ADCIAP). He also served as the Vice Chairman of the National Intelligence Council from 2002–2005. After the creation of the Director of National Intelligence, his position was realigned to meet the recommendations of the 9/11 and WMD Commissions. The functions of his position were divided and incorporated into several roles in the new ODNI structure.

As the Assistant Director, Lowenthal was instrumental in having the Intelligence Community adopt the National Intelligence Priorities Framework (NIPF). The framework provides guidance on the priorities of the President for intelligence collection requirements. It is the basis upon which all analysis and production decisions are made and ultimately impacts all members of the Intelligence Community. Reportedly, Lowenthal also started a process to evaluate the Community's performance against the NIPF. This function was later adopted by the Office of the Director of National Intelligence to report on and to senior policymakers on the progress the Intelligence Community was making against its directed areas for exploration.

=== Iraq National Intelligence Estimate ===
As the ADCIAP, Lowenthal was one of the key coordinators and evaluators of the National Intelligence Estimate on Iraq leading up to Operation Iraqi Freedom. In a 2009 Op-Ed in The Washington Post, Lowenthal vehemently defends the protection he and his office extended to the product from the forces of politicization:

The 2002 estimate claiming that Iraq possessed weapons of mass destruction had little influence on anyone's decision about going to war. Only six senators actually read the NIE, but 77 voted to authorize the use of force. As analytically flawed as that estimate might have been, the one intelligence "sin" the council did not commit was "politicization" -- that is, writing what the policymaker wants to hear. Even the Senate intelligence committee's investigation of the Iraq NIE agreed; it wasn't politicized to support invasion."

Lowenthal contends that given the information available at the time, it would not have been possible to determine the absence of weapons of mass destruction in Iraq.

=== Intelligence community reforms ===
Lowenthal has been one of several voices in opposition to the initiatives to change the way the Intelligence Community produces analysis. He serves the intelligence community as the president and CEO of the Intelligence & Security Academy, LLC, which is a national security education, training, and consulting organization.

In 2007, Lowenthal attended the ODNI's Analytic Transformation conference held in Chicago. At that event, he took the microphone questioning the ultimate objective and endstate of analytic transformation. He called into question the ability of technological solutions like Intellipedia and A-Space to resolve some of the most pressing reforms in the community.

Lowenthal was quoted as saying, "I think, unfortunately, a lot of this is pandering to a bunch of commissions that have no understanding of what we do for a living, or the nature of our work, and to a workforce. And I don't think that's a sufficient ground for a transformation. And so I'm left here wondering, what's the end state? For what reason?"

In January 2009, Lowenthal was interviewed by Charlie Rose on the American television interview show Charlie Rose. He discussed several topics related to national security and intelligence. In that interview, Dr. Lowenthal expressed his opinion that the overall community was appropriately sized, but that the experience levels of the community were extraordinarily low. He went on to indicate that the staff of the ODNI was too large and should be evaluated for downsizing.

== Jeopardy! appearances ==
Lowenthal was a successful contestant on the American game show Jeopardy!. He first appeared as a contestant in the spring of 1988 and went on to win the Tournament of Champions in that year. In 1990, Lowenthal was a quarterfinalist on Super Jeopardy!; in 2005, he played in the first round of the Ultimate Tournament of Champions and won $5,000 after losing his first round game, and in 2014, he won in the first round of the Battle of the Decades, defeating Frank Spangenberg and Phoebe Juel.

His total cash winnings were $159,901, plus $10,000 from the Battle of the Decades. He returned for the quarterfinals of the Battle of the Decades, and was matched up against 2009 Grand Champion Dan Pawson and all-time money winner Brad Rutter. However, he finished third and received $10,000.

In 1992, Lowenthal co-wrote Secrets of the Jeopardy Champions with Chuck Forrest, a fellow Jeopardy! champion. The book was marketed as an instruction manual for prospective contestants on "America's favorite question-and-answer game".

== Published works ==
- Lowenthal, Mark M. Intelligence: From Secrets to Policy, CQ Press; 10th edition, 2025; ISBN 978-1071940716.
- Lowenthal, Mark M. ‘’Vigilance Is Not Enough: A History of U.S. Intelligence’’ Yale University Press, 2025; ISBN 9780300269291
- Lowenthal, Mark M. The U.S. Intelligence Community: An Annotated Bibliography (Organizations and Interest Groups), Routledge, 1994; ISBN 978-0-8153-1423-3.
- Forrest, Chuck; and Lowenthal, Mark. Secrets of the Jeopardy Champions, Grand Central Publishing, 1992; ISBN 978-0-446-39352-2.
- Lowenthal, Mark M. U.S. Intelligence: Evolution and Anatomy Second Edition (The Washington Papers), Praeger Paperback, 1992. ISBN 978-0-275-94434-6.
- Lowenthal, Mark M. Leadership & Indecision (Harvard Dissertations in American History and Political Science), Dissertations-G, 1988. ISBN 978-0-8240-5137-2.
- Lowenthal, Mark M. Crispan Magicker, Avon Books, 1979. ISBN 978-0-380-42333-0.
