= Chuck Forrest =

American game show contestant (born 1960-61)

- Born: 1960 or 1961 (age 65–66)
- Education: Yale University; University of Michigan Law School
- Occupation: Attorney
- Known for: 5-time Jeopardy! champion and former record holder

Charles Forrest III (born 1960 or 1961) is an American attorney and game show contestant who at one time held the record for the largest non-tournament cash winnings total on the syndicated game show Jeopardy! The Los Angeles Times called him "the Alexander the Great of Jeopardy! players." The producers of the show regarded Forrest as one of the best and most memorable contestants of the 1980s. He is widely regarded by other elite Jeopardy! players to be one of the most formidable contestants ever to play.

== Background ==
Forrest is from Livonia, Michigan. He attended Birmingham Seaholm High School, Yale University, and University of Michigan Law School. Forrest and Mark Lowenthal, a five-time champion in Season 4, co-wrote the 1992 book Secrets of the Jeopardy Champions. Like Forrest, Lowenthal won his Tournament of Champions. A revised edition of the book was released in 2017 as an Amazon Kindle book.

In 1992, Forrest was a candidate for the U.S. House of Representatives, entering the Republican primary for Michigan's 9th congressional district, which at the time included his home town of Grand Blanc. He finished in third place, with 9,875 votes. As of 2014, Forrest lives in Italy, where he is a lawyer with the International Fund for Agricultural Development.

== Appearances on Jeopardy! ==
=== Initial run ===
Forrest, who was described at the time as a law student from Grand Blanc, Michigan, had a series of victories in Season 2 of Jeopardy!, starting on September 30, 1985. After four games, he set the regular play cash winnings record, with $60,000. When Forrest went on to play his fifth game on October 4, 1985, he broke his own cash winnings record, with 5-day cash winnings of $72,800. Under the Jeopardy! rules in effect at the time of Forrest's victory, he retired undefeated. His record lasted until early in Season 6 of Jeopardy!, when Bob Blake won $82,501. Blake's record lasted until the middle of Season 6, when Frank Spangenberg accumulated a 5-day total of $102,597.

=== Tournament of Champions ===
Forrest went on to win the 1986 Tournament of Champions. In the quarterfinals, which was the first round, he defeated Guy Tonti and Gary Palmer. (Palmer advanced as a "wild card" high scoring nonwinner.) In the semi-finals, Forrest defeated Jay Rosenberg and Gary Giardina. In the two-game final, Forrest defeated Paul Rouffa and Marvin Shinkman, adding another $100,000 to his total cash winnings. That final series was featured in a July 29, 1989, PBS documentary called Wise Guys, a behind-the scenes look at the program.

==== Super Jeopardy! ====
In the 1990 Super Jeopardy! tournament, Forrest was defeated in the quarterfinals, or the first round, by Dave Traini. That appearance added $5,000 to Forrest's total winnings. Traini would eventually become the third-place finalist. In the 2002 Million Dollar Masters tournament, Forrest lost his semi-final to Bob Verini, picking up another $25,000 in the process. Verini placed third in the finals. In the 2005 Ultimate Tournament of Champions, Forrest received a bye into Round 2 in recognition of his former regular-play cash winnings record. However, Forrest came in third in his Round 2 game and received another $25,000 ($10,000 as a runner-up and another $15,000 for the 2nd round bye). The scores were $0 for Forrest, $28,200 for the winner Phil Yellman, and $12,999 for Lara Robillard. There were no "wild card" spots for nonwinners in the Ultimate Tournament of Champions, meaning neither Robillard nor Forrest had a chance of advancing to Round 3. Yellman, coming in second in round 3, lost to Pam Mueller along with Brian Moore. At the end of Super Jeopardy, Forrest's total cash winnings totaled $227,800.

=== Battle of the Decades ===
Forrest returned for the Battle of the Decades tournament on February 3, 2014. He became a quarterfinalist, defeating India Cooper and Jim Scott. Cooper returned for the quarterfinals as a standby contestant. On May 9, Forrest competed against 1990s champion Mark Dawson and 2000s champion Colby Burnett. Forrest won the game by $900, while Burnett in second place, moved on as a wildcard. Forrest competed against Ken Jennings and Russ Schumacher in the semi-finals on May 12 and briefly led in the Double Jeopardy! round, but ultimately finished in second place to Jennings, who moved on to the finals. Forrest earned $25,000 in that appearance bringing his all-time cash winnings on Jeopardy to a grand total of $252,800.

=== "Forrest Bounce" ===
Forrest implemented a strategy known as the "Forrest Bounce" in his play to potentially confuse opponents, a strategy that is now commonly used by contestants. (Forrest referred to the technique as the "Rubin Bounce" after a law school friend, Donn Rubin, who first suggested it.) The Forrest Bounce is applied in the Jeopardy! and Double Jeopardy! rounds with the player in control of the board "bouncing" between different categories rather than continuing through individual categories in sequence. According to Forrest, "The basic point is, you know where you're going next and [your competitors] don't." Former host Alex Trebek expressed aggravation with people who use the Forrest Bounce, noting that the show's writers purposely set up the clues in each category to flow when picked sequentially; he noted in a 2018 interview that Forrest did not do well in all-star tournaments using the Forrest Bounce, vindicating Trebek's feelings on the topic and his suspicion that Forrest was "trying to disrupt" the game.

== See also ==
- Strategies and skills of Jeopardy! champions
