= GeoSafari =

Brand of technological educational toys

- Owner: Educational Insights, Inc.

Official website
- www.educationalinsights.com/category/our-brands/all-geosafari.do

GeoSafari is a product line of technological educational toys, including the GeoSafari electronic teaching aid, GeoSafari Globe, and the Phonics Lab, owned by Educational Insights, Inc.

GeoSafari is an electronic self-teaching device created by brothers Burton and Stanley Cutler, who founded Educational Insights, Inc. in 1962. Educational Insights, Inc. released the GeoSafari electronic geography teaching aid in 1987. It was later re-released by Educational Insights, Inc. in 1990. The system uses two-sided, laminated cards that fit into the front of the machine. The center of the card has numbered elements that correspond to the answers, and the sides of the card have a list of questions or prompts. During game play, the device activates a light next to a random question, and the user types in the number of the answer element. After all the questions are answered, the machine presents a score. Card topics include history, geography, math, astronomy, zoology, anatomy, geology, science, foreign languages, reading, and various others. Several versions were released through the 1990s, but Educational Insights no longer produces the GeoSafari.

In October 2006, Educational Insights was acquired by Learning Resources, Inc. in a $24.2 million merger. A GeoSafari Laptop using the same numbered-card format was sold as of 2013.

== Video games ==
A GeoSafari quiz game application created by Educational Insights Interactive was one of eight program applications included in the 1995 Microsoft Home Pack, which featured Microsoft's "social interface" Microsoft Bob. The following year, Education Insights developed other quiz games with a completely new interface independent of the Microsoft Bob framework and compatible on both Windows and Macintosh. Each game is about a specific topic:

- GeoSafari Animals (October 1995)
- GeoSafari Geography (1995)
- GeoSafari History (1995)
- GeoSafari Science (1995)
- GeoSafari Knowledge Pad: The Plato Collection (2001)

The games are narrated by Richie Havens. In those quiz games, there can be up to four players. A player then picks a sub-topic out of a collection concerning the relevant topic. During gameplay, a player is asked a question, provided with facts and clues, and then has to pick one out of several multiple choice answers in a limited time to score points. The player then has three chances to get the question right. Upon running out of time, getting the answer wrong or choosing to show answer, the player is shown the actual answer with no points scored. Upon completing all the questions, the player's score is totaled. Achieving a perfect score grants the player a medal. If a player earns medals for all the sub-topics of the game topic, the player is awarded a trophy.
