= Jeopardy! Australia =

Australian television quiz show

- Genre: Quiz show
- Based on: Jeopardy! by Merv Griffin
- Presented by: Stephen Fry
- Announcer: Grant Stevens
- Theme music composer: John Hoke (Bleeding Fingers Music); Chris Bell Music & Sound Design; Original theme composed by Merv Griffin
- Ending theme: "Think!"
- Country of origin: Australia
- Original language: English
- No. of seasons: 2
- No. of episodes: 14

Production
- Production locations: Dock10 in Manchester, England
- Running time: 60 minutes
- Production companies: Whisper North; Sony Pictures Television; Network 10; Paramount Global Content Distribution

Original release
- Network: Nine Network
- Release: 20 April 2024 – present

Jeopardy! Australia is an Australian quiz show based on Jeopardy! and is a second revival version of the show. The show is broadcast on the Nine Network, produced jointly by Sony Pictures Television (through Whisper North) and Network 10 (through Paramount Global Content Distribution), premiering on 20 April 2024, featuring contestants who are Australian expatriates in the United Kingdom and Europe. Stephen Fry is the show's presenter.

== History and production ==
There had been two prior iterations of Jeopardy! in Australia; a 1970s version had been presented by figures such as Bob Sanders, Mal Walden, Graham Webb, and Andrew Harwood. In 1993, Network Ten premiered a short-lived revival hosted by former Sale of the Century presenter Tony Barber.

In September 2023, it was announced that the Nine Network had acquired a second revival of Jeopardy!, which would be hosted by British comedian Stephen Fry. The series was produced alongside a British revival of Jeopardy! also hosted by Stephen Fry, and filmed from the Dock10 studios in Salford using Australian Britons as contestants.

The second consists of 8 episodes. It began broadcasting on 29 December 2025 and concluded on 13 January 2026.

== Transmissions ==
Series overall	Series	Start date	End date	Episodes	Presenter
1	1	20 April 2024	1 June 2024	6	Stephen Fry
2	2	29 December 2025	13 January 2026	8	Stephen Fry

== Gameplay ==
The gameplay follows the same format as the British version of the show, adapted from the current format of the American version. Six categories are announced, each with a column of five trivia clues (phrased in answer form), each one incrementally valued more than the previous, ostensibly by difficulty. The subjects range from standard topics including history and current events, the sciences, the arts, popular culture, literature and languages, to pun-laden titles (many of which refer to the standard subjects) and wordplay categories.

The host then reads the clue, some of which are accompanied by an audio or visual clue after which any of the three contestants will ring in using a hand-held signalling device. The first contestant to ring in successfully, following the host's reading of the clue, then had to respond in the form of a question.

A correct response earns the dollar value of the clue and the opportunity to select the next clue from the board. The Double Jeopardy! round requires players to give responses in the form of a question, or it will be considered incorrect. An incorrect response or a failure to respond within the 5-second time limit deducts the dollar value of the clue from the contestant's score and gives any remaining opponent(s) the opportunity to ring in and respond. If none of the contestants can give a correct response, the host reads the correct response and the last contestant to have given a correct answer chooses the next clue.

== Reception ==
Ben Pobjie of The Sydney Morning Herald in comparing presenter Stephen Fry's performances on the British and Australian versions wrote that he has "a lot more witty asides and spontaneous outpourings" in the latter. The Sun-Herald's JMangan said Fry "brings a warm humour to the role".

In a positive review, The Age said, "Contestants appear to be among the most cerebral and sensible in the land, doing Australia proud, rapidly unscrambling tricky anagrams and cryptic clues." James Wigney of the Herald Sun stated, "Fans of the original can rest assured that all the familiar elements are still in play and Fry is very much in his element".
