= Steve Jones (English presenter) =

English disc jockey and TV presenter (born 1945)

- Born: David Jones; 7 June 1945 (age 80); Crewe, Cheshire, England
- Occupations: Musician, DJ, television presenter, voiceover artist
- Years active: 1972–present

Steve Jones (born, David Jones, 7 June 1945) is an English disc jockey, television presenter, voiceover artist and former musician. He is most well known for presenting gameshow The Pyramid Game from 1981 to 1984 and again in 1989-90. The game had previously been part of LWT's The Steve Jones Game Show in 1979–1980. He was notable for his large collection of brightly coloured spectacles.

In the 1960s, he played as a bassist for Lonnie Donegan, and formed the band Hunt, Lunt & Cunningham.

In 1972, he briefly worked as a disc jockey on BBC Radio 1, before moving to the BBC Radio 2 early show. In 1974, he joined Radio Clyde. Later he was a stand-in presenter on Radio 2, for the likes of David Hamilton.

In 1980 he provided the BBC Radio 2 commentary for the Eurovision Song Contest, which was held in The Hague. In the mid-1980s he made several appearances in Dictionary Corner on the gameshow Countdown. He also hosted Jeopardy! and Search for a Star. In 1984, he hosted Radio 2's Lunchtime Show between noon and 2 pm. A year later he moved to a late-night spot on Saturdays, before departing when Radio 2 (under Bryant Marriott) changed its music policy for a more easy listening 1940s-based sound. He then began a long association with LBC. During the 2000s, he occasionally presented the overnight show on Talksport.

In 1992, Jones provided commentary on the opening ceremony of Disneyland Paris for ITV. Nowadays he mainly works as a voiceover artist, commentating on such events as the Royal Variety Performance and the British Comedy Awards. For many years (possibly since the station's inception in 2012) he presented a two-hour weekly show on Scotland 69am (www.scotland69am.com), which combined music from across the decades, Jones's general observations and the 'Well I Never!' feature where Jones would reveal unusual facts on a wide range of topics. Jones left the station in late 2022, prior to the station's closure in the following January.
