= Derek Hobson =

British broadcaster

- Born: Derek Hobson; 23 March 1949 (age 77); Essex, England
- Occupations: radio broadcaster and journalist

Derek Hobson (born 23 March 1949) is an English TV and radio broadcaster and journalist. He was best known as the original host of ITV's New Faces which he presented from 1973 to 1978; a total of 164 episodes. He introduced, among others, Lenny Henry, Victoria Wood, Debbie McGee, Jim Davidson, Les Dennis and Michael Barrymore to a weekly Saturday night audience of more than 12 million viewers.

Hobson was also a continuity announcer for ATV in Birmingham and was one of the presenters of the regional news programme ATV Today.

After leaving ATV, Hobson co-presented Not For Women Only, a regional magazine programme for TVS with Jill Cochrane who worked as a features reporter. He also presented and co-created the format for the game show That's My Dog for TSW which ran for four years on the ITV network from 1984.
