= List of game show hosts =

This is a list of game show hosts. A game show host is a profession involving the hosting of game shows. Game shows usually range from a half hour to an hour long and involve a prize. Foreign-language shows that are part of franchises may be referred by their franchise name.

== A ==
Host	Country	Game show(s) hosted
Willie Aames	United States	The Krypton Factor (1990–91)
Michael Absalom	United Kingdom	Best of Friends (2004–08)
Mike Adamle	United States	American Gladiators (1989–96), Battle of the Network Reality Stars (2005)
Don Adams	United States	Don Adams' Screen Test (1975–76)
Kaye Adams	United Kingdom	Public Property (2001), The People Versus (2001)
Rick Adams	United Kingdom	Crazy Cottage (1996), Karaoke Challenge (1997), Home Truths (1998), Mission: Paintball (2002), Dance Revolution (2006–07)
Jason Agnew	Canada	PopQ (2007), Brain Battle (2007–08), Sunday Morning Trivia (2010), Splatalot (2011), Door To Door (2012)
Donna Air	United Kingdom	The Cooler (1998), Donna in Need (2001), Five Go Dating (2001), The Club (2003)
Dave Aizer	United States	Slime Time Live (2000–04), Nickelodeon Robot Wars, Wild & Crazy Kids (2002)
Ray Alan	United Kingdom	Tichpuzzle! (1964–65), Where in the World? (1970–72), It's Your Word (1973), Three Little Words
Steve Albert	United States	MTV Rock N' Jock (1990), Battle Dome (1999–2001)
Ogie Alcasid	Philippines	Game Na, Game Na! (1994–96), Family Feud (2001–02), Da Big Show (2008), Hole in the Wall (2009)
Robert Alda	United States	Personality Puzzle (1953), What's Your Bid? (1953), Can Do (1956)
Maiquel Alejo	United States	The Big Spin (1993–2009)
Archie Alemania	Philippines	Mysmatch (2008)
John Ales	United States	Lip Service (1993–94)
Ben Alexander	United States	Party Time at Club Roma (1950–51), About Faces (1960–61)
Heather Alexander	United States	Flamingo Fortune (1995–96)
Jed Allan	United States	Celebrity Bowling (1971–78)
Fred Allen	United States	Judge for Yourself (1953–54)
Mel Allen	United States	Jackpot Bowling (1959–60)
Peter Allen	United States	The Hollywood Game (1992)
Steve Allen	United States	I've Got a Secret (1964–67)
Tom Allen	United Kingdom	Bake Off: The Professionals (2018–present)
Matt Allwright	United Kingdom	Food Poker (2007), The Exit List (2012), The Code (2016–2017)
Cristela Alonzo	United States	Legends of the Hidden Temple (2021)
Bree Amer	Australia	Friday Night Games (2006)
Morey Amsterdam	United States	Battle of the Ages (1952)
Anthony Anderson	United States	To Tell the Truth (2016–2022)
Bill Anderson	United States	The Better Sex (1977–78), Fandango (1983–89)
Clive Anderson	United Kingdom	Whose Line Is It Anyway? (1988–99), If I Ruled the World (1998–99), Mastermind (2001–02), Back in the Day (2005), Brainbox Challenge (2008), Maestro (2008)
Dougie Anderson	United Kingdom	Stars in Fast Cars (2005–06)
John Anderson	United States	Wipeout (2008–14)
Larry Anderson	United States	Truth or Consequences (1987–88), The Big Spin (1995–96), Trivia Track (1997)
Louie Anderson	United States	Family Feud (1999–2002)
Eamonn Andrews	United Kingdom	What's My Line? (1951–63; 84–87), Crackerjack (1955–64), Place the Face (1957), Top of the World (1982)
Ralph Andrews	United States	Lingo (1988)
Thea Andrews	Canada	Cooking for Love (1995–2000)
Angélica	Brazil	Video Game (2001–2012)
Toby Anstis	United Kingdom	Fan TC (1994–95), TV Scrabble (2001–02), Trust Me – I'm a Holiday Rep (2005)
Andrew Anthony	Canada	Qubit (2009–10)
Kris Aquino	Philippines	Pilipinas, Game KNB? (2001–07), Kapamilya, Deal or No Deal (2006–09), Wheel of Fortune (2008), Pinoy Bingo Night (2009), The Price Is Right (2011)
Alexander Armstrong	United Kingdom	Best of the Worst (2006), Don't Call Me Stupid (2007–09), Pointless (2009–), Alexander Armstrong's Big Ask (2011–13), Epic Win (2011), Prize Island (2013), Don't Ask Me Ask Britain (2017)
Bill Armstrong	United States	Liar's Club (1976–77)
Will Arnett	United States	Lego Masters (2020–present)
Richard Arnold	United Kingdom	Celebrity Addicts (2003), Soap Addicts (2003), Take It or Leave It (2006–08), Soapstar Superchef (2007)
Tom Arnold	United States	Beat The Blondes (2007 Unsold pilot)
DJ Laila Asis	Philippines	Games Uplate Live (2008–09)
Michael Aspel	United Kingdom	Crackerjack (1968–74), A Song for Europe (1969; 76), The Movie Quiz (1974), Quest (1975), Star Games (1978–80), Give Us a Clue (1979–84), Child's Play (1984–88), Ultra Quiz (1984), Murder Weekend (1989), Blockbusters (1997), Going for a Song (2001–02)
Dave Attell	United States	The Gong Show with Dave Attell (2008)
Richard Ayoade	United Kingdom	The Crystal Maze (2017–present)

== B ==
Host	Country	Game show(s) hosted
Mel B	United Kingdom / United States	This is My Moment (2001) (UK), The Singing Office (2008) (USA), Lip Sync Battle UK (2016–2018) (UK)
Przemysław Babiarz (pl)	Poland	Jeopardy!
Dirk Bach	Germany	I'm a Celebrity - Get Me Out of Here!, Frei Schnauze
Amitabh Bachchan	India	Who Wants to be a Millionaire (Hindi) (2000–02), (2005)
Richard Bacon	United Kingdom	Rent Free (2002), Get Staffed (2003), 19 Keys (2003), Back to Reality (2004), The Big Idea (2006), Richard Bacon's Beer & Pizza Club (2010–11), Show Me the Telly (2013), The Big Painting Challenge (2015), Eternal Glory (2015)
David Baddiel	United Kingdom	The Book Quiz (2007)
Ben Bailey	United States	Cash Cab (2005–12), Who's Still Standing? (2011–12)
Bill Bailey	United Kingdom	Bill Bailey's Birdwatching Bonanza (2010)
Jack Bailey	United States	Truth or Consequences (1954–56), Queen for a Day (1956–64)
Mark Bailey	United Kingdom	Swap Team (2000)
Danny Baker	United Kingdom	Win, Lose or Draw (1990–93), Bygones (1994), Pets Win Prizes (1994), The Sitcom Showdown (2006)
George Balcan	Canada	It's Your Move (1974–75)
Hugo Egon Balder	Germany	Genial daneben
Clare Balding	United Kingdom	Famous and Fearless (2011), Britain's Brightest (2013)
Alec Baldwin	United States	Match Game (2016–2021)
Johnny Ball	United Kingdom	Johnny Ball Games (1980–81), The Great Egg Race (1980), Secrets Out!!! (1985–87), Fun and Games (1987), Swapheads (2002)
Zoë Ball	United Kingdom	Class Of... (2002), The Match (2005–06), Extinct: The Quiz (2006), Soapstar Superstar (2007), Grease Is the Word (2007), Britain's Best Brain (2009), Can't Touch This (2016), The Big Family Cooking Showdown (2017–2018)
Brent Bambury	Canada	Test the Nation (2007–08)
Elizabeth Banks	United States	Press Your Luck (2019–present)
Tyra Banks	United States	America's Got Talent (2017–18), Dancing with the Stars (2020–2022)
Duncan Bannatyne	United Kingdom	Beat the Bank (2008)
Andrew Barber	Canada	Beer Money (2012)
Tony Barber	Australia	Family Feud (1977–80), Sale of the Century (1980–91), Jeopardy! (1992), Wheel of Fortune (1996)
Jillian Barberie	Canada	Ex-treme Dating (2002–04)
Nate Bargatze	United States	The Greatest Average American (game show) (2026–present)
Bob Barker	United States	Truth or Consequences (1956–74), The Family Game (1967), The New Price is Right/The Price Is Right (1972–2007), That's My Line (1980–81)
Sue Barker	United Kingdom	A Question of Sport (1997–2021)
Rolando Barral	Cuba	Sábado Gigante (1986–88)
Gretchen Barretto	Philippines	You & Me Against the World (2008)
Alex Barris	Canada	Front Page Challenge (1957), One of a Kind (1958–59)
Chuck Barris	United States	The Gong Show (1976–80)
Win Barron	Canada	Front Page Challenge (1957)
John Barrowman	United Kingdom	The Movie Game (1994–95), The Kids Are All Right (2008), Pressure Pad (2013–14), Superstar Dogs: Countdown to Crufts (2014) Celebrity Pressure Pad (2014)
Jack Barry	United States	Juvenile Jury (1947–56 & 1970–71), Life Begins at Eighty (1950–1956), Twenty-One (1956–58), Tic-Tac-Dough (1956), Concentration (1958), The Generation Gap (1969), The Joker's Wild (1972–75 & 1977–84), Break the Bank (1976–77), Joker! Joker!! Joker !!! (1979–80)
Michael Barrymore	United Kingdom	Get Set Go (1984), Strike It Lucky (1986–99), My Kind of Music (1998–2002)
Nick Bateman	United Kingdom	Trust Me (2000)
Roger Baulu	Canada	La Poule aux oeufs d'or (1958–66)
Jon Bauman	United States	The Pop 'N Rocker Game (1983–84), Match Game-Hollywood Squares Hour (co-hosted with Gene Rayburn) (1983–84), Karaoke Showcase (circa 1986–87)
Chip Beall	United States	Whiz Quiz, Texaco Star Academic Championship, Texaco Star National Academic Championship
Rob Beckett	United Kingdom	Wedding Day Winners (2018), All Together Now (2018–2019), Head Hunters (2019)
Paolo Bediones	Philippines	Digital LG Quiz (1999–2004), Tok! Tok! Tok! Isang Milyon Pasok (2007–2008), Whammy! Push Your Luck (2007–2008)
Sarah Beeny	United Kingdom	Four Rooms (2016–present)
Dani Behr	United Kingdom	Ice Warriors (1998)
Angellica Bell	United Kingdom	50/50 (2003–04), That's Genius! (2003), CelebAir (2008), Election (2008)
Bill Bellamy	United States	Last Comic Standing (2007–08), Let's Ask America (2014-2015)
Robert Belushi	United States	Get a Clue (2020–21)
Rolf Benirschke	United States	Wheel of Fortune (1989)
Sebastien Benoit	Canada	La Poule aux oeufs d'or (2018–present)
Dave Benson Phillips	United Kingdom	Get Your Own Back (1991–2004), Petswap (2001)
Mark Benton	United Kingdom	The Edge (2015), My Kitchen Rules (2016–present)
Mark Beretta	Australia	The Master (2006–07)
Bob Bergen	United States	Jep! (1998)
Tom Bergeron	United States	Hollywood Squares (1998–2004), Dancing with the Stars (2005–19)
Peter Berner	Australia	The Einstein Factor (2005–present)
Corbin Bernsen	United States	How Much Is Enough? (2008)
Buzz Berry	United States	Sqrambled Scuares (2002–11)
Mayim Bialik	United States	Jeopardy! (2021–23)
Pedro Bicchieri	United States	Apple Bowl (1980–present)
Jason Biggs	United States	Cherries Wild (2021)
Cilla Black	United Kingdom	Blind Date (1985–2003), The Moment of Truth (1998–2001)
Michael Ian Black	United States	Spy TV (2001), Reality Bites Back (2008)
Lionel Blair	United Kingdom	Name That Tune (1984–87)
Larry Blyden	United States	Personality (1967–69), You're Putting Me On (1969), The Movie Game (1969–70), What's My Line? (1972–75)
Eric Boardman	United States	Liar's Club (1988–89)
Bill Boggs	United States	All-Star Anything Goes (1977)
Heidi Bohay	United States	GSN Live (2008–10)
Michael Bolton	United States	The Celebrity Dating Game (2021)
Alexander Bommes	Germany	The Chase (Germany)
Danny Bonaduce	United States	Starface (2006)
Mike Bongiorno	Italy	Lascia o raddoppia? (1955–59), Campanile Sera (1959–62), Caccia al numero (1962), La Fiera dei Sogni (1962–65), Giochi in Famiglia (1966–69), Rischiatutto (1970–74), Scommettiamo? (1976–78), Lascia o raddoppia? (remake, 1979), I sogni nel cassetto (1979–80), Flash (1980–82), Bis (1981–90), Superflash (1982–85), Pentathlon (1985–87), Telemike (1987–92), Tris (1990–91), Tutti per uno (1992), La ruota della fortuna (1989–2003), Genius (2005), Il Migliore (2006–07)
Paolo Bonolis	Italy	Ciao Darwin (1980–present)
Elayne Boosler	United States	Balderdash (2004–05)
Carlo Boszhard	Netherlands	Cash en Carlo (2002–05), Staatsloterij Live!, Rad Van Fortuin (2009)
Dominic Bowden	New Zealand	Are You Smarter than a 10 Year Old? (2007–08)
Jim Bowen	United Kingdom	Bullseye (1982–95)
Lee Bowman	United States	What's Going On (1954)
Jordan Brady	United States	Turn It Up! (1990)
Wayne Brady	United States	Celebrity Duets (2006), Don't Forget the Lyrics! (2007–09), Let's Make a Deal (2009–present), Game of Talents (2021)
Jeff Brazier	United Kingdom	Big Brother Panto (2004–05), Finders Keepers (2006)
Rory Bremner	United Kingdom	The Ultimate West Wing Challenge (2006), Face the Clock (2013)
Fern Britton	United Kingdom	Names and Games (1984), Ready Steady Cook (1994–2000), Soapstar Superstar (2006), All Star Mr & Mrs (2008–10), For What It's Worth (2016), Culinary Genius (2017–present)
Charlie Brooker	United Kingdom	You Have Been Watching (2009–10)
Rob Brough	Australia	Family Feud (1989–95)
Harry Brown	Canada	Ooops! (1970–71)
Kourtney Brown	Bahamas	My GamesFever (2006–07)
Kurt Browning	Canada	Battle of the Blades (2009–12)
Fiona Bruce	United Kingdom	Call My Bluff (2003–05), What Are You Like? (2008), Hive Minds (2015–2016)
Wally Bruner	United States	What's My Line (1968–72)
Karyn Bryant	United States	Name That Video (2001–02)
Rob Brydon	United Kingdom	Would I Lie to You? (2009–present), The Guess List (2014)
Neil Buchanan	United Kingdom	Finder Keepers (1991–96), Your Number Please (1992)
Pat Bullard	Canada / United States	Baloney (1988–89), Hold Everything (1990), Love Connection (1998–99), Card Sharks (2001)
Beethoven Bunagan a.k.a. Michael V.	Philippines	Ready, Txt, Go! (2002), Hole in the Wall (2009)
Emma Bunton	United Kingdom	Don't Stop Believing (2010)
Lou van Burg	Netherlands	Der goldene Schuss
Michael Burger	United States	Straight to the Heart (1989), Personals (1991–92), Man O Man (1995), Family Challenge (1996–97), Match Game (1998–99)
John Burgess	Australia	Wheel of Fortune, Burgo's Catch Phrase
Brooke Burke	United States	Dancing with the Stars (2010–13)
Nate Burleson	United States	Hollywood Squares (2025)
Brooke Burns	United States	Dog Eat Dog (2002–03), Rock Star (2005–06), Hole in the Wall (2008–09), You Deserve It (2011), The Chase (2013–15), Master Minds (2020–present), Tic Tac Dough (2025),
Gordon Burns	United Kingdom	The Krypton Factor (1977–95), A Word in Your Ear (1993–94)
Regan Burns	United States	Obliviou$ (2002–04)
Ashleigh Butler	United Kingdom	Who Let the Dogs Out? (2013–14)
Billy Bush	United States	Let's Make a Deal (2003)
Carlos Bustamante	Canada	The Next Star (2013–14)
John Byner	United States	Relatively Speaking (1988–89)

== C ==
Host	Country	Game show(s) hosted
Bob Cadman	Canada	Reach for the Top (1970s / 1980s)
Jim Caldwell	United States	Tic-Tac-Dough (1985–86), Top Card (1989–91)
Morley Callaghan	Canada	Detective Quiz (1952), Crossword Quiz (1953)
Susan Calman	United Kingdom	Top Class (2016–present), The Boss (2017–present), Armchair Detectives (2017)
Nicky Campbell	United Kingdom	Wheel of Fortune (1988–96)
Tom Campbell	United States	Camouflage (1980)
Lisa Canning	United States / Virgin Islands	Knights and Warriors (1992–93)
Nick Cannon	United States	Nick Cannon Presents Wild 'N Out (2005–present), America's Got Talent (2009–16), Lip Sync Battle Shorties (2016–19), The Masked Singer (2019–present), The Masked Dancer (2020–21), Beat Shazam (2023)
Guido Cantz	Germany	Deal or No Deal (Germany)
Blaine Capatch	United States	Beat the Geeks (2002)
Al Capp	United States	What's the Story (1953), Anyone Can Win (1953)
Rudi Carell	Netherlands	Am laufenden Band
Drew Carey	United States	Whose Line Is It Anyway? (1998–2007), Play for a Billion (2003), Drew Carey's Green Screen Show (2004–05), Power of 10 (2007–08), The Price Is Right (2007–present), Drew Carey's Improv-A-Ganza (2011)
Alan Carr	United Kingdom	Alan Carr's Celebrity Ding Dong (2008), The Singer Takes It All (2014), Alan Carr's 12 Stars of Christmas (2016), The Price is Right (2017), Alan Carr's Epic Gameshow (2020)
Jimmy Carr	United Kingdom	Your Face or Mine? (2002–03; 17-), Distraction (2003–04, UK; 2005–06, USA), The Big Fat Quiz of the Year (2004–), 8 Out of 10 Cats (2005–), 8 Out of 10 Cats Does Countdown (2012–)
Michael Carrington	United States	Think Fast (1989)
Jasper Carrot	United Kingdom	Golden Balls (2007–2009)
Johnny Carson	United States	Earn Your Vacation (1954), Do You Trust Your Wife?/Who Do You Trust? (1957–62)
Witney Carson	United States	Catch 21 (2019)
Dana Carvey	United States	First Impressions (co-hosted with Freddie Prinze Jr.) (2016)
Michael Catherwood	United States	Chain Reaction (2015–16)
Marion Caunter	Malaysia	One in a Million (2006–08)
Dick Cavett	United States	College Bowl (1987)
Cedric the Entertainer	United States	It's Worth What? (2011), Who Wants to Be a Millionaire (2013–14)
Jimmy Cefalo	United States	Trump Card (1990–91), Sports Snapshot! (1993)
John Cena	United States	Are You Smarter than a 5th Grader (2019), Wipeout (2021–present)
John Cervenka (as Burt Luddin)	United States	Burt Luddin's Love Buffet (1998)
Omar Chaparro	Mexico	¿Qué dice la gente? (2008)
Craig Charles	United Kingdom	Cyberzone (1993), Heaven and Hell Live! (1997), Robot Wars (1998–2004), Jailbreak (2000)
Liam Charles	United Kingdom	Bake Off: The Professionals (2018–present)
Keith Chegwin	United Kingdom	Cheggers Plays Pop (1978–86), Anything Goes (1984–5), Sky Star Search (1989–91), Roll with It (1995), Sale of the Century (1997), It's a Knockout (1999–2001), Naked Jungle (2000), I'm Famous and Frightened! (2004)
Julie Chen Moonves	United States	Big Brother (2000–present)
Carol Cheng	Hong Kong	Weakest Link (2001–02)
Todd Christensen	United States	American Gladiators (1990)
Spencer Christian	United States	Triple Threat (1992–93)
Danny Lee Clark	United States	American Gladiators (1995–96)
Dick Clark	United States	The Object Is (1963–64), Missing Links (1964), The $10,000/$20,000/$25,000/$50,000/$100,000 Pyramid (1973–80, 1981 & 1982–89), The Krypton Factor (1981), The Challengers (1990–91), Scattergories (1993), It Takes Two (1997), Winning Lines (2000)
Jack Clark	United States	100 Grand (1963), Dealer's Choice (1974–75), Twenty Questions (1975 pilot), The Cross-Wits (1975–80)
Jeremy Clarkson	United Kingdom	Who Wants to Be a Millionaire? (2018)
Kelly Clarkson	United States	American Song Contest (2022)
Rylan Clark-Neal	United Kingdom	Babushka (2017), The Wave (2018), Supermarket Sweep (2019–present), Ready Steady Cook (2020–present)
Bob Clayton	United States	Make A Face (1961–62), Concentration (1969–73)
Nick Clooney	United States	The Money Maze (1974–75)
Andrew Cochran	Canada	5-4-3-2-Run (1988–90)
Dorothea Coelho	United States	Who Gets the Dog? (2005)
Dan Coffey	United States	Wait Wait... Don't Tell Me! (1998–99)
Andy Cohen	United States	Love Connection (2017–2018)
Mark Cohen	United States	Make Me Laugh (1998)
Marty Cohen	United States	Slime Time (1988)
Nathan Cohen	Canada	Fighting Words (1953–62, 1970)
Paul Coia	United Kingdom	Catchword (1988–95)
Jennifer Cole	United States	Sex Wars (2000–01)
Jonathan Coleman	Australia / United Kingdom	Have a Go, Blind Taste (1997)
Vivianne Collins	United States	You're On! (1998), Wild & Crazy Kids (2002)
Bud Collyer	United States	Winner Take All (1948–50), Beat the Clock (1950–61), On Your Way (1953–54), Feather Your Nest (1954–56), To Tell the Truth (1956–68), Number Please (1961)
Ray Combs	United States	Family Feud/The New Family Feud Challenge (1988–94), Family Challenge (1995–96)
Frank Conniff	United States	Are You Positive (1952)
Hans Conried	United States	Made In America (1964)
Jim Conroy (as Ruff Ruffman)	United States	Fetch! with Ruff Ruffman (2006–10)
Bert Convy	United States	Tattletales (1974–78 & 1982–84), Super Password (1984–89), Win, Lose or Draw (1987–89), 3rd Degree (1989–90), Match Game (1990, unaired pilot)
Anderson Cooper	United States	The Mole (2001–02)
Jeff Coopwood	United States	$100,000 Fortune Hunt (1989–90), Know Your Heritage (1990)
Alicia Coppola	United States	Remote Control (1990)
Ronnie Corbett	United Kingdom	Small Talk (1994–96)
Carl Cordell	United States	Lucky Partners (1958)
Anna Coren	Australia	Australia's Brainiest Kid (2004)
Victoria Coren Mitchell	United Kingdom	Late Night Poker Ace (2005–06), Only Connect (2008–present)
Dan Cortese	United States	My Dad Is Better than Your Dad (2008), Guinness World Records Gone Wild (2013–2014)
Bill Cosby	United States	You Bet Your Life (1992–93), Kids Say the Darndest Things (1997-2000)
Sara Cox	United Kingdom	Flatmates (1999), Make My Day (2002), The Great Pottery Throw Down (2015–present), Britain's Most Spectacular Backyard Builds (2016)
Wayne Cox	Canada	Second Honeymoon (1987–88), Talk About (1989–90), Acting Crazy (1991–94)
John Craven	United Kingdom	It's Your Word (1973), Brainchild (1974–5), Beat the Brain (2015)
Gavin Crawford	Canada	How Do You Solve a Problem Like Maria? (Canada) (2008)
Terry Crews	United States	Who Wants to Be a Millionaire (2014–15), Ultimate Beastmaster (2017–present), America's Got Talent (2019–present)
Annabel Croft	United Kingdom	Interceptor (1989–90)
Neil Crone	Canada	Wild Guess (1988)
Leslie Crowther	United Kingdom	The Price Is Right (1984–88), Stars in Their Eyes (1990–92)
Jessi Cruickshank	Canada	Canada's Smartest Person (2015–present)
Timmy Cruz	Philippines	Philippine Lottery Draw
Larry Csonka	United States	American Gladiators (1990–93)
Bill Cullen	United States	Act It Out (1949), Winner Take All (1952), Bank on the Stars (1954), The Price Is Right (1956–65), Eye Guess (1966–69), Three on a Match (1971–74), Winning Streak (1974–75), The $25,000 Pyramid (1974–79), Pass the Buck (1978), Password Plus (1980, sub), Chain Reaction (1980), Blockbusters (1980–82), Child's Play (1982–83), Hot Potato (1984), The Joker's Wild (1984–86)
Marianne Curan	United States	Super Decades, Prime Games (1996–97), Trivia Track (1997–98), When Did Then Happen?, Cat-Minster (2007), GSN Radio (2009)
Mark Curry	United States	Don't Forget Your Toothbrush (2000)
Dick Curtis	Canada	Bet Your Bottom Dollar (1963)

== D ==
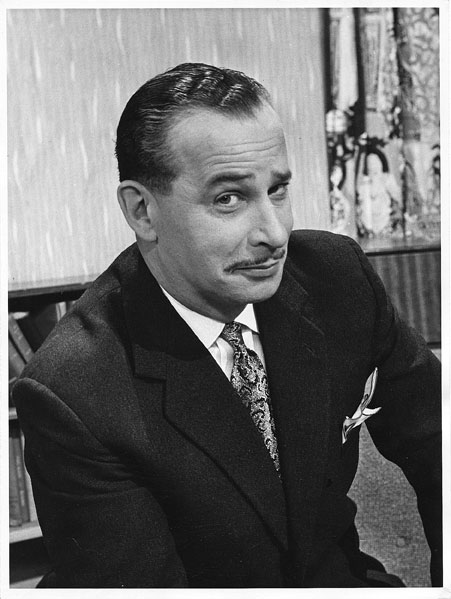
Roy Ward Dickson Canadian game show host and creator of Mr. and Mrs.

Host	Country	Game show(s) hosted
Ray D'Arcy	Ireland	2Phat, Blackboard Jungle, Test the Nation, You're a Star
Cameron Daddo	Australia	Perfect Match (1987 – mid 1988), Pirate Master (2007)
Andy Daly	United States	Match Game (2008, unaired pilot)
John Charles Daly	United States	What's My Line? (1950–67), It's News to Me (1951–54)
Dingdong Dantes	Philippines	Family Feud
Mike Darow	Canada / United States	Dream House (1968–70), Going Places (1973–80), The $128,000 Question (1976–77), Opposite, Opposite Sexes (1976–77), Bluff (1976–77), Jackpot (1985–88)
Doug Davidson	United States	The New Price Is Right (1994–1995)
John Davidson	United States	Time Machine (1985), Hollywood Squares (1986–89), The $100,000 Pyramid (1990–91)
Greg Davies	United Kingdom	Taskmaster (2015–present)
Elliot Davies	United Kingdom	Keynotes (2022–present)
DeRay Davis	United States	Mind of a Man (2014), Hip Hop Squares (2017–present)
Evan Davis	United Kingdom	Dragons' Den (2005–present)
Fred Davis	Canada	Front Page Challenge (1957–95)
Jeff B. Davis	United States	The Line (co-hosted by Candace Bailey) (2014)
Warren Davis	Canada	Reach for the Top (1965–66)
Warwick Davis	United Kingdom	Celebrity Squares (2014–15), Tenable (2016–present)
Richard Dawson	England / United States	Masquerade Party (1974–75), Family Feud (1976–85 & 1994–95)
Darren Day	United Kingdom	Clockwise (1990–91), You Bet! (1996-97)
Christopher de Leon	Philippines	Who Wants to Be a Millionaire? (2000–03)
Joey de Leon	Philippines	Eat Bulaga!
Angus Deayton	United Kingdom	Have I Got News for You (1990–2002), Bognor or Bust (2004), Would I Lie to You? (2007–2008), Bake Off: Crème de la Crème (2017)
Mark DeCarlo	United States	Studs (1991–93), Big Deal (1996)
John Deeks	Australia	Family Feud (1996)
Cat Deeley	United Kingdom / United States	So You Think You Can Dance (2006–present), 20Q (2009), The Choice (2012)
Simon Deering	Australia	The Up-Late Game Show (2005)
Ellen DeGeneres	United States	Ellen's Game of Games (2017–2021)
Les Dennis	United Kingdom	Family Fortunes (1987–2002), Classic Comeback (2006–07), In the Grid (2006–07), Fee Fi Fo Yum (2010–11)
Zooey Deschanel	United States	The Celebrity Dating Game (2021)
George DeWitt	United States	Name That Tune (1955–59)
Roy Ward Dickson	Canada	The Quizz Club (1936), Fun Parade (1939), Take a Chance! (1939, radio), What d'You Know? (1953), P.M. (1953), Bonanza (1953), Turnabout (1953), Claim to Fame (1953), $1000 Word (1958), Full House (1959), Think of a Word, Abracadabra (1959), Try for Ten! (1960), Take a Chance! (1960 TV), Mr. and Mrs. (1963)
Alistair Divall	United Kingdom	Keynotes (1989-1992)
Alesha Dixon	United Kingdom	Alesha's Street Dance Stars (2011–13), Your Face Sounds Familiar (2013), Dance Dance Dance (2017–present)
Evan Dollard	United States	BattleFrog College Championship (2014–15)
Snoop Dogg	United States	The Joker's Wild (2017–19), American Song Contest (2022)
Joel Dommett	United Kingdom	The Masked Singer (2020–present), Hey Tracey! (2019–2020)
Colby Donaldson	United States	Top Shot (2010–13), Top Guns (2012)
Declan Donnelly	United Kingdom	Friends Like These (1999–2001), Pop Idol (2001–03), I'm a Celebrity...Get Me Out of Here! (2002–present), Gameshow Marathon (2005), All-Star Cup (2006), PokerFace (2006–07), Britain's Got Talent (2007–present), Ant & Dec's Push the Button (2010–11), Red or Black? (2011–12)
Hugh Downs	United States	Concentration (1958–69)
Louise DuArt	United States	Rodeo Drive (1990)
Al Dubois	Canada	Bumper Stumpers (1987–90). Whiz Kids (1990–91)
Patrick Duffy	United States	Bingo America (co-hosted with Crystal Wallach) (2008)
Sharon Dunn	Canada	Reach for the Top (1984)
Stephen Dunne	United States	You're on Your Own (1956–57)
Jamie Durie	Australia	Backyard Blitz (2000–07), The Block (2003–04)
Bil Dwyer	United States	Ballbreakers (2000–02), Dirty Rotten Cheater (2003), Extreme Dodgeball (2004–05), I've Got a Secret (2006)
Jeff Dye	United States	Money from Strangers (2012–13), That Awkward Game Show (2016–present), Who the Bleep is That (2022-2023)
Bob Dyer	Australia	Pick a Box (1948–57, radio), (1957–71, TV)

== E ==
Host	Country	Game show(s) hosted
Robert Earle	United States	College Bowl (1962–70)
Noel Edmonds	United Kingdom	Come Dancing, Juke Box Jury (1979), Telly Addicts (1985–98), Deal or No Deal (2005–16), Are You Smarter than a 10 Year Old? (2007–10), Cheap Cheap Cheap (2017–present)
Matt Edmondson	United Kingdom	Fake Reaction (2013–14), Release the Hounds (2017–present)
Edward'O	Nicaragua	12 Corazones (2005–17)
Geoff Edwards	United States	Hollywood's Talking (1973), The New Treasure Hunt (1973–77/1981–82), Jackpot (1974–75 & 1989–90), Shoot for the Stars (1977), Play the Percentages (1980), Chain Reaction (1980, as a sub-host), Starcade (1983–85), The All-New Let's Make A Deal (1985, as a sub-host), The New/$40,000 Chain Reaction (1986–91), Fun & Fortune (1996–2002)
Ralph Edwards	United States	Truth or Consequences (1941 & 1950–52)
Rick Edwards	United Kingdom	Relentless (2008), Stars and Strikes (2010–11), Tool Academy (2011–12), Safeword (2015–present), Impossible (2017–present)
Billy Eichner	United States	Billy on the Street (2011–present)
Rich Eisen	United States	The Great Escape (2012)
Carmen Electra	United States	Singled Out (1997–98)
Win Elliot	United States	Twenty questions (1958)
Bob Elliott	United States	The Name's the Same (1955)
Gordon Elliott	Australia / United States	To Tell the Truth (1990) It's Your Chance of a Lifetime (2000), Wanna Bet? (2008)
Rob Elliott	Australia	Wheel of Fortune
Bob Elson	United States	Identify (1949)
Frank Elstner	Germany	Wetten, dass..?, Jeopardy! (1994–98)
Graham Elwood	United States	Strip Poker (1999–2001), Cram (2003–04)
Ron Ely	United States	Face the Music (1980–82)
Larry Emdur	Australia	The Price Is Right, Cash Bonanza, Family Double Dare, The Main Event, Wheel of Fortune
Peter Emmerson	Canada	Connection (1977)
Blake Emmons	Canada	The New Chain Reaction (1986)
Dick Enberg	United States	The Perfect Match (1967), Sports Challenge (1971–79), Baffle/All-Star Baffle (1973–74), Three for the Money (1975)
Bill Engvall	United States	Lingo (2011)
Bob Eubanks	United States	The Newlywed Game (1966–74, 1977–80, 1985–89 & 1997–2000), The Diamond Head Game (1975), Rhyme and Reason (1975–76), All Star Secrets (1979), Dream House (1983–84), Trivia Trap (1984–85), Card Sharks (1986–89), Family Secrets (1993), Powerball: The Game Show (2000–02)
Wesley Eure	United States	Finders Keepers (1987–88)
Greg Evans	Australia	Perfect Match, Crossfire
Kylee Evans	Canada	Just Like Mom and Dad (2018–present)

== F ==
Host	Country	Game show(s) hosted
Clifton Fadiman	United States	Information Please Radio: (1938–51) TV: (1952), The Name's the Same (1955)
Donald Faison	United States	Who Gets the Last Laugh? (2013), Winsanity (2016–18)
Jimmy Fallon	United States	That's My Jam (2022–present)
Joe Farago	United States	Break The Bank (1985–86)
Jamie Farr	United States	Stumpers (1976)
Laurie Faso	United States	I'm Telling (1987–88)
Gil Fates	United States	CBS Television Quiz (1941–42)
Joey Fatone	United States	The Singing Bee (2007), The Singing Office (2008), Common Knowledge (2019–2021)
George Fenneman	United States	Anybody Can Play (1958), Your Surprise Package (1961–62)
Stacy Ferguson	United States	Great Pretenders (1-3)
Craig Ferguson	United States	Celebrity Name Game (2014–17), The Hustler (2021), Scrabble (2026–present)
Tim Ferguson	Australia	Don't Forget Your Toothbrush
Noel Fielding	United Kingdom	The Great British Bake Off (2017–present)
Guy Fieri	United States	Minute to Win It (2010–11), Guy's Grocery Games (2013–Present), Dessert Games (2017)
Tarik Filipović	Croatia	Who Wants to be a Millionaire (2002–present)
Pat Finn	United States	The Joker's Wild (1990–91), Shop 'til You Drop (1991–94, 1996–98, 2000–02), The Big Spin (1999–2004)
Shandi Finnessey	United States	Lingo (2005–07), PlayMania (2006–07), Quization (2007), 100 Winners (2007)
Pete Firman	United Kingdom	Stake Out (2008), Wait for It..! (2009)
Danielle Fishel	United States	Say What? Karaoke (co-hosted with Steven Hill) (2003)
Jordan Fisher	United States	Dancing with the Stars: Juniors (2018–19)
Ryan Fitzgerald	Australia	Friday Night Games (2006)
Greg Fitzsimmons	United States	Idiot Savants (1996–97)
Flavor Flav	United States	Flavor of Love (2006–08)
Art Fleming	United States	Jeopardy!/The All New Jeopardy! (1964–75 & 1978–79), College Bowl (1978)
Sean Fletcher	United Kingdom	Rebound (2015–2016)
Freddie Flintoff	United Kingdom	One Hundred and Eighty (2015), Australian Ninja Warrior (2017–present) (Australia), Cannonball (2017–present)
Gerry Fogarty	Canada	Reach for the Top (1960s)
Kirk Fogg	United States	Legends of the Hidden Temple (1993–95)
Jean-Pierre Foucault	France	Who Wants to be a Millionaire (2000–2016)
Sofie Formica	Australia	Now You See It
Sara Forsberg	United Kingdom	Remotely Funny (2017–present)
Bruce Forsyth	United Kingdom	The Generation Game (1971–77; 90–94), Play Your Cards Right (1980–87; 94–2003), Hollywood or Bust (1984), Bruce Forsyth's Hot Streak (1986), You Bet! (1988–90), Takeover Bid (1990–91), Bruce's Price Is Right (1995–2001) Didn't They Do Well (2004), Strictly Come Dancing (2004–14)
Joe Fowler	United States	Maximum Drive (1994)
Sonny Fox	United States	Way Out Games (1975–76)
Jeff Foxworthy	United States	Are You Smarter Than a 5th Grader? (both network (2007–09, 2015) and syndicated (2009–11) versions), The American Bible Challenge (2012–14), The American Baking Competition (2013)
Jamie Foxx	United States	Beat Shazam (2017–present)
Cornelia Frances	Australia	Weakest Link (2001–02)
Arlene Francis	United States	Blind Date (1949–1952)
Stewart Francis	Canada	You Bet Your Ass (2005–07)
Stu Francis	United Kingdom	Crackerjack (1980–84), Ultra Quiz (1985), Crush a Grape (1987–88)
Kevin Frank	Canada	Kidstreet (1987–92), The Next Line (1991)
Kirk Franklin	United States	The American Bible Challenge (2013–14)
Zoe French	United Kingdom	Bikini Beach
David Frost	United Kingdom	Through the Keyhole (1987–2008)
Joachim Fuchsberger	Germany	Auf Los geht's los
Stephen Fry	United Kingdom	QI (2003–16)
John Fugelsang	United States	World Series of Blackjack (2004–07), World Blackjack Tour (2006–07)

== G ==
Host	Country	Game show(s) hosted
Eden Gaha	Australia	Vidiot (1991–93)
Dan Gallagher	Canada	Test Pattern (1989–91)
Jack Gallagher	United States	The Big Spin (1996–98)
Sourav Ganguly	India	Dadagiri Unlimited (2009–11, 2013–present)
Billy Gardell	United States	Monopoly Millionaires' Club (2015–16)
Joe Garagiola	United States	He Said, She Said (1968–69), Memory Game (1971). Sale of the Century (1971–73), To Tell the Truth (1977), Strike It Rich (1986)
Ralph Garman	United States	The Joe Schmo Show (2003), Joe Schmo 2 (2004)
Boboy Garovillo	Philippines	Islands Gamemasters (1990–92)
Bamber Gascoigne	United Kingdom	University Challenge, Connoisseur
Steven Gätjen	Germany	Fort Boyard (2001–02), Champions Day (2001), Der Maulwurf (The Mole), Speed (2002), Schlag den Raab (2011–2015),
Zak George	United Kingdom	Who Let the Dogs Out? (2011–12)
Janno Gibbs	Philippines	Are You Smarter Than a 5th Grader? (2007–present)
Mel Giedroyc	United Kingdom	Casting Couch (1999), The Great British Bake Off (2010–16) Draw It! (2014), Relatively Clever (2015), Let It Shine (2017), Let's Sing and Dance for Comic Relief (2017–present), Letterbox (2017–present), The Generation Game (2017–present)
Johnny Gilbert	United States	Music Bingo (1958), Beat the Odds (1968–69), Fast Draw (1968)
Rhod Gilbert	United Kingdom	Never Mind the Buzzcocks (2014), UK's Best Part-Time Band (2016–present)
Nikki Glaser	United States	Blind Date (2019–20)
Jackie Gleason	United States	You're in the Picture (1961)
Ben Gleib	United States	Idiotest (2014–2017)
Bob Goen	United States	Perfect Match (1986), Home Shopping Game (co-hosted by Bob Circosta) (1987), Blackout (1988), Wheel of Fortune (1989–91), The Hollywood Game (1992), Born Lucky (1992), That's the Question (2006–07), GSN Radio (2008–09)
Mike Goldman	Australia	Big Brother Up-Late, Friday Night Games (2006)
Bobcat Goldthwait	United States	Bobcat's Big Ass Show (1998)
Richard Gomez	Philippines	Family Feud (2008–10)
Mayra Gómez Kemp	Spain	Un, dos, tres... responda otra vez (1982–1988)
Len Goodman	United Kingdom	Len Goodman's Partners in Rhyme (2017)
Mark Goodman	United States	Illinois Instant Riches (1994–98), Illinois Luckiest (1998–2000)
Bill Goodwin	United States	It Pays to be Married (1955)
Mark-Paul Gosselaar	United States	Brains & Brawn (1993)
Thomas Gottschalk	Germany	Wetten, dass..? (1987–92, 1993–2011)
Glenn Gough	United States	Whiz Quiz (1980–present)
Ray Goulding	United States	The Name's the Same (1955)
Ben Grauer	United States	Americana/Ben Grauer's Americana Quiz (1947–49), Look Ma, I'm Acting/Act It Out/Say It with Acting (1949–50 & 1951), What Happened? (1952)
Natalie Grant	United States	It Takes a Church (2014–15)
Barry Gray	United States	Winner Take All (1951)
George Gray	United States	Extreme Gong (1998), Weakest Link (2002–03), I'd Do Anything (2002–05)
Hughie Green	United Kingdom	Double Your Money (1955–68)
Mike Greenberg	United States	Duel (2007–08)
David Alan Grier	United States	Random Acts of Comedy (1999–2000), Snap Decision (2017–19)
Merv Griffin	United States	Play Your Hunch (1958–62)
Edward Grimes	United Kingdom	Jedward's Big Adventure (2012–14)
John Grimes	United Kingdom	Jedward's Big Adventure (2012–14)
Freddie Grisewood	United Kingdom	Spelling Bee (1938)
Adam Growe	Canada	Cash Cab (2008–present)
Alex Guarnaschelli	United States	Supermarket Stakeout (2019–present)
Lisa Guerrero	United States	The World Series of Pop Culture (2006)
Bill Guest	Canada	Reach for the Top (1969–85), Beyond Reason (1977–79)
Rob Guest	Australia	Man O Man (1994)
Bob Guiney	United States	GSN Live (2009–11)
Mohan "Mo Twister" Gumatay	Philippines	Kabarkada, Break the Bank (2007–present)
Jason Gunn	New Zealand	The Rich List (2007–present), Wheel of Fortune (2008–09)
Peter Gzowski	Canada	Fighting Words (1982)

== H ==
Host	Country	Game show(s) hosted
Buddy Hackett	United States	You Bet Your Life (1980)
Sara Haines	United States	The Chase (2021–present)
Monty Hall	Canada / United States	Twenty One (1958), Keep Talking (1968), Video Village/Video Village Junior (1961–62), Let's Make a Deal (1963–76, 1980, 1984–85 & 1990–91), It's Anybody's Guess (1977), Beat the Clock (1979–80), The Joke's on Us (1983–84), Split Second (1986–87)
Alan Hamel	Canada	Anniversary Game (1969–70)
David Hamilton	United Kingdom	All Clued Up (1988–91)
Richard Hammond	United Kingdom	Time Commanders (2005), Battle of the Geeks (2006), Total Wipeout (2009–12), Richard Hammond's Blast Lab (2009–11), Winter Wipeout (2011–12)
Nick Hancock	United Kingdom	They Think It's All Over (1995–2004)
John Handra	United States	Navisite Trivia Power Hour (2020)
Alyson Hannigan	United States	Girl Scout Cookie Championship (2020)
Paul Hanover	Canada	Showdown (1961–62), It's Your Move (1964–67, 1975–79), Pay Cards (1973)
Chris Hardwick	United States	Trashed (1994), Singled Out (1995–98), @midnight (2013–17), The Wall (2016–present)
Bob Harper	United States	The Biggest Loser (2016; 2020–present)
Pat Harrington Jr.	United States	Stump the Stars (1962)
Ainsley Harriott	England / United States	Can't Cook, Won't Cook (1995–2000), Ready... Set... Cook! (2000–01), Ready Steady Cook (2000–10)
Dan Harris	United States	500 Questions (2016)
Jason Harris	United States	Double Dare 2000 (2000–01)
Neil Patrick Harris	United States	Genius Junior (2018)
Ralph Harris	United States	Contraption (2008–09)
Chris Harrison	United States	Mall Masters (2001), The Bachelor (2002–2021), The Bachelorette (2003–2021), Bachelor Pad (2010–12), You Deserve It (co-hosted with Brooke Burns) (2011), Bachelor in Paradise (2014–present), Who Wants To Be a Millionaire (2015–2019), The Bachelor Winter Games (co-hosted with Hannah Storm) (2018), The Bachelor Presents: Listen to Your Heart (2020)
Don Harron	Canada	Anything You Can Do (1972–74)
Kevin Hart	United States	TKO: Total Knock Out (2018)
Moss Hart	United States	Answer Yes or No (1950)
Steve Harvey	United States / South Africa	Family Feud (2010–present), Celebrity Family Feud (2015–present), Steve Harvey's Funderdome (2017), Family Feud South Africa (2020–present)
Tom Harvey	Canada	Communicate (1966)
Andrew Harwood	Australia	It's Academic (1971–79)
Barney Harwood	United Kingdom	Crush (2003–04), Sport Relief Gets Sub'd (2006), The Sorcerer's Apprentice (2007), Basil's Game Show (2008–10), School of Silence (2009), Bamzooki (2009–10)
Bob Hastings	United States	Dealer's Choice (1974, first two weeks)
Bob Hawk	United States	Take It or Leave It (1940–41), The Bob Hawk Show (1943–48)
Bailey Hayden	United Kingdom	Double Dare (2022–present)
Julie Hayek	United States	Break the Bank (1985–86)
Peter Lind Hayes	United States	Alumni Fun (1964, 1965 & 1966)
Richard Hayes	United States / Canada	Name That Tune (1970–71), All About Faces (1971–72)
Anne Hegerty	United Kingdom	Britain's Brightest Family (2018)
Vince Henderson	United Kingdom	Chain Letters (1996), Cross Combat (1998)
John Henson	United States	Wipeout (2008–14), Late Night Liars (2010), iWitness (2017)
Chuck Henry	United States	Now You See It (1989)
Armandi Hernández	Mexico	Family Feud (2019)
Nick Hewer	United Kingdom	Countdown (2012–2022)
John Michael Higgins	United States	America Says (2018-2022) Split Second (2023-present)
Harry Hill	United Kingdom	Harry Hill's Stars in Their Eyes (2015)
Adam Hills	Australia	Spicks and Specks (2005–11), Monumenta (2013) (Northern Ireland), Celebrity Fifteen to One (2013–present) (UK)
Bob Hilton	United States	Truth or Consequences (1977–78), The Guinness Game (1979–80), Let's Make a Deal (1990–91)
Charlotte Hindle	United Kingdom	Clockwise (1989)
David Hirsch	United States	Beach Clash (co-hosted with Alison Armitage) (1994–95)
Hulk Hogan	United States	American Gladiators (co-hosted with Laila Ali) (2008)
Jools Holland	United Kingdom	Juke Box Jury (1989–90), Name That Tune (1997–98)
Clint Holmes	United States	Honda Campus All-Star Challenge (1990–95)
Dave Holmes	United States	Say What? Karaoke (1998–2000)
Eamonn Holmes	United Kingdom	Physical Pursuits (1988), Time Please (1991–92), Pot Black (1991–92), All Mixed Up (1998–2002), Pass the Buck (1999–2000), The Third Degree (1999–2000), Playing for Time (2000–01), Jet Set (2001–07), Jet Set Departure Lounge (2001–02), Remotely Funny (2002), TV Scrabble (2003), Hard Spell (2004–05), Would You Pass the Eleven Plus? (2004–05), SUDO-Q (2005–07), The Rich List (2006) (USA), Big Bumper Science Quiz (2007), Gift Wrapped (2014), It's Not Me, It's You (2016)
Bob Holness	South Africa	Blockbusters (1983-1993), Call My Bluff (1996–2003), Raise the Roof (1995–96)
Ryan Horwood	Canada	Cache Craze (2013–14)
Mike Hosking	New Zealand	Who Wants to be a Millionaire (2008)
Paul Houde	Canada	Lingo (1998–2001)
Julie Houle	Canada	La Poule aux oeufs d'or (2018–present)
Hillary Howard	United States	It's Academic (2013–present)
Tom Howard	United States	It Pays to Be Ignorant (Radio: (1942–51) TV: (1949–51))
Lil Rel Howery	United States	Small Fortune (2021)
Janice Huff	United States	NY Wired (1997–98)
D. L. Hughley	United States	Trust Me, I'm a Game Show Host (co-hosted with Michael Ian Black) (2013)
Dave Hull	United States	Matchmaker (1987–88)
Warren Hull	United States	Strike It Rich (1948–58)
Kate Humble	United Kingdom	Webwise (1999), Rough Science (2000–05), Escape (2000), One Man and His Dog (2008–11), Wild Things (2015–present), Curious Creatures (2017–present)
Jake Humphrey	United Kingdom	That's Genius! (2003), Bamzooki (2004–06), Beat the Pack (2013)
John Humphrys	United Kingdom	Mastermind (2003–2021), Celebrity Mastermind (2003–2021)
Gemma Hunt	United Kingdom	Bamzooki: Street Rules (2009–10), Swashbuckle (2013–present)
Konnie Huq	United Kingdom	Eat Your Words (1994–96), Hannah-Oke (2009), King of the Nerds (2015)
Nadiya Hussain	United Kingdom	The Big Family Cooking Showdown (2017–present)

== I ==
Host	Country	Game show(s) hosted
Sal Iacono	United States	Win Ben Stein's Money (2002–03)
Krzysztof Ibisz	Poland	It's Your Chance of a Lifetime (2000-2002), Awantura o kasę (2002-2005 2024-present) Russian Roulette (2003–04), Clueless (2005–07), Dirty Rotten Cheater (2008-2009), Joker (2017-2018)
Arnell Ignacio	Philippines	GoBingo (1996–98, 2008), Golympics (1998–99), K! The P1 Million Videoke Challenge (2002–05), Now Na! (2006–07)
Carrie Ann Inaba	United States	1 vs. 100 (2010–11)
Matt Iseman	United States	American Ninja Warrior (2010–present), American Ninja Warrior: Ninja vs. Ninja (2016), American Ninja Warrior Junior (2018–19)

== J ==
Host	Country	Game show(s) hosted
Craig Jackson	United States	30 Seconds to Fame (2002–03), Midnight Money Madness (2006)
Jay Jackson	United States	Twenty questions (1952–55)
Chris Jagger	United States	Change of Heart (1998–2001, 2002–03)
Art James	United States	Say When!! (1961–65), Temptation (1967–68), Matches 'n Mates (1967–68), Pay Cards! (1968–69, 1981–82), It's Academic (1963–67, 1968–71), The Who, What, or Where Game (1969–74), The Magnificent Marble Machine (1975–76), Blank Check (1975), Word Grabbers (1976, unaired pilot), Catchphrase (1985)
Dennis James	United States	Cash and Carry (1946–47), Okay, Mother (1948–51), Chance of a Lifetime (1952–56), The Name's the Same (1954–55), High Finance (1956), Haggis Baggis (1959), Beat the Odds (1962–63), Your First Impression (1962–64), People Will Talk (1963), PDQ (1965–69), The Nighttime Price Is Right (1972–77), Name That Tune (1974–75)
Greg James	United Kingdom	Unzipped (2012)
Janelle James	United States	The Final Straw (2022–present)
Jameela Jamil	United Kingdom	The Misery Index (2019–present)
Chris Jarvis	United Kingdom	Look Sharp (1995–96), Jungle Run (2001–02), Maths Mansion (2002)
Günther Jauch	Germany	Who Wants to be a Millionaire (1999–present)
Stu Jeffries	Canada	Love Handles (1996–98)
Ken Jennings	United States	Jeopardy! (2021–present)
Ken Jeong	United States	I Can See Your Voice (2020–present)
Chris Jericho	United States	Downfall (2010)
Penn Jillette	United States	Identity (2006–07)
Jaymee Joaquin	Philippines	Games Uplate Live (2006–08)
Sandy Jobin-Bevans	Canada	Just Like Mom and Dad (2018–2019)
Arte Johnson	United States	Knockout (1977–78)
Dwayne Johnson	United States	The Hero (2013), The Titan Games (2019–present)
Jay Johnson	United States	Celebrity Charades (1979)
R. Brandon Johnson	United States	72 Hours (2013)
Rahman Johnson	United States	Nickelodeon Splat! (2004)
Roger Johnson	United Kingdom	4 Square (2021–present)
Tony Johnston	Australia	My Generation, Time Masters, Wipeout (1999–2000)
The Amazing Jonathan	United States	Ruckus (1991–92)
Charlie Jones	United States	Almost Anything Goes (1975–76), Pro-Fan (1977)
Leslie Jones	United States	Supermarket Sweep (2020-2022)
Orlando Jones	United States	Crash Course (co-hosted by Dan Cortese) (2009)
Steve Jones	United Kingdom	The Pyramid Game (1984–90), When Women Rule the World (2008), Let's Dance (2009–13), As Seen on TV (2009), Drop Zone (2010), 101 Ways to Leave a Gameshow (2010), The X Factor (2011) (USA), Hair (2014)
Toccara Jones	United States	Take the Cake (2007), The Ultimate Merger (2011)
Ulrika Jonsson	United Kingdom	Gladiators (1992–2000), Techno Games (2000), Dog Eat Dog (2001–02)
Astrid Joosten	Netherlands	2 voor 12 (1991–present)
Kimberley Joseph	Australia	Gladiators (1995–96)
Elaine Joyce	United States	The All-New Dating Game (1986–88)

== K ==
Host	Country	Game show(s) hosted
Chris Kamara	United Kingdom	Ninja Warrior UK (2014–present)
Russell Kane	United Kingdom	Unzipped (2012)
Gabe Kaplan	United States	High Stakes Poker (2006)
Richard Karn	United States	Family Feud (2002–06), Bingo America (co-hosted with Diane Mizota) (2008–09)
Jonathan Karsh	United States	Kid Nation (2007)
Vernon Kay	United Kingdom	Boys and Girls (2003), HeadJam (2004), Celebrities Under Pressure (2004), All Star Family Fortunes (2006–15), Gameshow Marathon (2007), Beat the Star (2009-09), The Whole 19 Yards (2010), Skating with the Stars (2010; USA), Million Dollar Mind Game (2011; USA), Let's Get Gold (2012), Splash! (2013–14), 1000 Heartbeats (2015–2016), Drive (2016)
Arielle Kebbel	United States	Perfect Score (2013)
Jon Kelley	United States	The Mole (2008), Funny You Should Ask (2017)
Jack Kelly	United States	Sale of the Century (1969–71)
Graham Kennedy	Australia	Blankety Blanks
Jason Kennedy	United States	Play for a Billion (2003), Oh Sit! (2012–13)
Kennedy	United States	Friend or Foe? (2002–04)
Tom Kennedy	United States	The Big Game (1958), You Don't Say! (1963–69, 1975), Split Second (1972–75), Break the Bank (1976), 50 Grand Slam (1976), Name That Tune/The $100,000 Name That Tune (1974–80), Whew!/Celebrity Whew! (1979–80), Password Plus (1980–82), Body Language (1984–86), The Nighttime Price Is Right (1985–86), Wordplay (1986–87)
Kerri-Anne Kennerley	Australia	Greed (2000)
Phil Keoghan	United States	The Amazing Race (2001–present), Tough as Nails (2020–present)
Tom Kerridge	United Kingdom	Bake Off: Crème de la Crème (2016)
Keegan-Michael Key	United States	Game On! (2020)
Salman Khan	India	Power of 10 (2009)
Shahrukh Khan	India	Who Wants to be a Millionaire (Hindi) (2007), Are You Smarter Than a 5th Grader? (2008)
Patrick Kielty	United Kingdom	Last Chance Lottery (1997), Big Ticket (1998), Stupid Punts (2001–03), Fame Academy (2002–03), Celebrity Love Island (2005–06), Your Country Needs You!, Bad Language (2016), Debatable (2016–2017)
Pat Kiernan	United States	Studio 7 (2004), The World Series of Pop Culture (2006–07)
Walter Kiernan	United States	Sparring Partners with Walter Kiernan (1949), What's the Story (1951–53), Who Said That? (1951–54), Who's the Boss? (1954)
Jimmy Kimmel	United States	Win Ben Stein's Money (1997–2000), Set for Life (2007), Who Wants to Be a Millionaire (2020–present)
John Reed King	United States	Missus Goes A-Shopping (Radio: 1934–44, TV: 1944–49), What's My Line (Radio: 1941), Double or Nothing (Radio: 1944–45), Give and Take (Radio: 1945–53), Chance of a Lifetime (1950–52), Battle of the Ages (1952), Beat the Clock (1952)
Greg Kinnear	United States	College Mad House (1990–91)
Myleene Klass	United Kingdom	The All Star Talent Show (2006), Last Choir Standing (2008), Miss Naked Beauty (2008), The National Lottery Big 7 (2009), Popstar to Operastar (2010–11), Escape from Scorpion Island (2010–11), BBQ Champ (2015)
Richard Kline	United States	To Tell The Truth (1990, accidentally aired pilot)
Christopher Knight	United States	Trivial Pursuit: America Plays (2008–09), Make Me Rich (2009)
Nick Knowles	United Kingdom	Judgemental (2002–04), Secrets of Magic (2005), Who Dares Wins (2007–2019), Last Choir Standing (2008), Guesstimation (2009), The National Lottery Big 7 (2009), Secret Fortune (2011–12), Perfection (2011–15), Break the Safe (2013–14), 5-Star Family Reunion (2015–2016)
Ulla Kock am Brink	Germany	Minute to Win It, Die Lotto-Show, Die 100.000 Mark Show
Liza Koshy	United States	Double Dare (2018–19)
Lynne Koplitz	United States	Change of Heart (2001–02)
George Kurdahi	Lebanon	Who Wants to be a Millionaire
Ernie Kovacs	United States	Take a Good Look (1959–61)
Jane Krakowski	United States	Name That Tune (2021)
Gary Kroeger	United States	The Newlywed Game (1996–97), Beat The Clock (2002)
Hans-Joachim Kulenkampff	Germany	Einer wird gewinnen

== L ==
Host	Country	Game show(s) hosted
Francisca Lachapel	Dominican Republic	Dale Replay (2017)
Nick Lachey	United States	The Winner Is (2013)
Vanessa Lachey	United States	Wipeout (2011–12)
Charles Lafortune	Canada	Are You Smarter Than a 5th Grader? (French - Québec) (2009–present)
Ricki Lake	United States	Gameshow Marathon (2006)
Mark Lamarr	United Kingdom	Never Mind the Buzzcocks (1996–2005)
Pierre Lalonde	Canada	The Mad Dash (1978–86)
Dave Lamb	United Kingdom	Horrible Histories: Gory Games (2011–present)
George Lamb	United Kingdom	Celebrity Scissorhands (2007–08), The Bank Job (2012)
Dylan Lane	United States	Chain Reaction (2006–07 & 2021–present)
Jim Lange	United States	Oh My Word (1965–67), The Dating Game/The New Dating Game (1965–74 & 1977–80), Spin-Off (1975), Give-n-Take (1975), Word Grabbers (1976, unaired pilots), Double Play (1976, unaired pilot),Bullseye (1980–82), The Newlywed Game (1984), The $100,000 Name That Tune (1984–85), The $1,000,000 Chance of a Lifetime (1986–87), Triple Threat (1988–89)
John Lapus	Philippines	Blind Item (2006)
Ewa Laurance	United States	Ballbreakers (2005)
Joey Lawrence	United States	Splash (co-hosted by Charissa Thompson) (2013)
Vicki Lawrence	United States	Win, Lose or Draw (1987–89)
T. J. Lavin	United States	The Challenge (1998–Present)
Chris Leary	United States	Master of Champions (co-hosted by Lisa Dergan) (2006)
Emma Lee	United Kingdom	The Great Big British Quiz (2005–07), Play DJ (2006–07)
Greg Lee	United States	Where in the World Is Carmen Sandiego? (1991–96)
Gypsy Rose Lee	United States	Think Fast (1949–50)
Phillip Leishman	New Zealand	Wheel of Fortune (1991–96)
Robert Lembke	Germany	Was bin ich?
Keith Lemon (Leigh Francis)	United Kingdom	Celebrity Juice (2008–2022), Sing If You Can (2011), Through the Keyhole (2013–2019)
Sunny Lenarduzzi	Canada	Beer Money (2012)
Jay Leno	United States	You Bet Your Life (2021–23)
John Leslie	United Kingdom	Wheel of Fortune, Scavengers
Sam Levenson	United States	Two for the Money (1955, sub/1956–57)
Phill Lewis	United States	Disney Channel Games (2006–08)
Robert Q. Lewis	United States	The Name's the Same (1951–54), Make Me Laugh (1958)
Bill Leyden	United States	Musical Chairs (1955), It Could Be You (1956–61), Your First Impression (1962–64), Call My Bluff (1965), Let's Face It (1967). You're Putting Me On (1969)
Girts Licis	Latvia	The Best Friends (1998–99), Who Wants to Be a Millionaire? (2007–08)
Traipop Limpapat	Thailand	Who Wants to Be a Millionaire? (2000–08)
Art Linkletter	United States	Life With Linkletter (1950–52 & 1969–70), Art Linkletter's House Party/The Linkletter Show (1952–69), People are Funny (1954–61), The Art Linkletter Show (1963)
Jack Linkletter	United States	Haggis Baggis (1958), The Rebus Game (1965)
Jürgen von der Lippe	Germany	Donnerlippchen, Geld oder Liebe
Robert Llewellyn	United Kingdom	Scrapheap Challenge (1998–2010)
Roger Lodge	United States	Blind Date (1999–2006), Camouflage (2007)
Gabby Logan	United Kingdom	You're Talking Absolute Football (1999), Presenters (2002), First Past the Post (2003), The Great British Test (2004–05), High Tackle (2009), Superstars (2012), Splash! (2013–14), I Love My Country (2013), Let's Play Darts (2015–16), Flockstars (2015), The Edge (2015)
Mario Lopez	United States	Masters of the Maze (1995), Pet Star (2002–05), America's Best Dance Crew (2008–12), Candy Crush (2017), Blank Slate (2024–present)
Loni Love	United States	Heads Up! (2016)
Chad Lowe	United States	Celebrity Charades (2005)
Olaf Lubaszenko	Poland	Najlepszy z najlepszych (2006-2007)
Ludacris	United States	Fear Factor (2017–18)
Allen Ludden	United States	College Quiz Bowl/G.E. College Bowl (1959–62), Password/Password All-Stars (1961–69, 1971–75), Win With the Stars (1968–69), The Joker's Wild (1969, unaired pilot), Stumpers (1976), Liar's Club (1977), Password Plus (1979–80)
Bobbi Sue Luther	United States	Junkyard Wars (2002)
Joe Lycett	United Kingdom	The Big Spell (2017), The Great British Sewing Bee (2018-present)
Des Lynam	United Kingdom	Countdown (2005–06)
Jane Lynch	United States	Hollywood Game Night (2013–2020), Weakest Link (2020–present)
Ben Lyons	United States	My Family's Got Guts (2008–09)

== M ==
Host	Country	Game show(s) hosted
Norm Macdonald	Canada	High Stakes Poker (2011)
Jeff MacGregor	United States	The All-New Dating Game (1988–89), Love at First Sight (1992)
Laird Macintosh	United States	Treasure Hunters (2006)
Lee Mack	United Kingdom	They Think It's All Over (2005–06), Duck Quacks Don't Echo (2014–present)
James Mackenzie	United Kingdom	Raven (2002–10)
Ron MacLean	Canada	Test the Nation (2008), Battle of the Blades (2009–13)
Carole MacNeil	Canada	Test the Nation (2010)
Jeremy Maggs	South Africa	Who Wants to Be a Millionaire (2000–05)
Magnus Magnusson	United Kingdom	Mastermind (1972–97)
Jeannie Mai	United States	Steampunk'd (2015)
Tommy Maitland (Mike Myers)	United States	The Gong Show (2017–2018)
Willie Maldonado	El Salvador	Fin de Semana (1976–2009), ¿Quién quiere ser millonario? (El Salvador) (2010–present)
Lisa Malosky	United States	American Gladiators (1993–95)
Howie Mandel	Canada / United States	Deal or No Deal (both network (2005–09, 2018–19) and syndicated (2008–10) versions), Deal or No Deal Canada (2007), 2009 Game Show Awards (2009), Take It All (2012), Bullsh*t: The Game Show (2022), The Price Is Right Tonight (2026–present)
Aasif Mandvi	United States	Would I Lie to You? (2022)
Jason Manford	United Kingdom	Show Me the Funny (2011), A Question of Sport: Super Saturday (2014), Money Pit (2015), Bigheads (2017–present)
Stephen Mangan	United Kingdom	The Fake News Show (2017–present)
Peyton Manning	United States	College Bowl (2021–present)
Edu Manzano	Philippines	Love Bites (1997–98), The Weakest Link (2001–02), Pilipinas, Game KNB? (2007–10), 1 vs. 100 (2007–08)
Luis Manzano	Philippines	Panahon Ko 'to!: Ang Game Show ng Buhay Ko (2010) Kapamilya, Deal or No Deal (2012–13 & 2015–present), Minute to Win It (2013–14)
Hal March	United States	The $64,000 Question (1955–58), What's It For? (1957–58), It's Your Bet (1969–70)
Hunter March	United States	Emogenius (2017)
Jeff Marder	United States	A Perfect Score (1992)
Bam Margera	United States	Bam's Bad Ass Game Show (2014)
Evan Marriott	United States	Fake-A-Date (2004)
Pat Marsden	Canada	Educated Guess
Peter Marshall	United Kingdom	Sale of the Century (1989–91)
Peter Marshall	United States	Hollywood Squares (1966–82), Storybook Squares (1969), All-Star Blitz (1985), Yahtzee (1988), The Reel to Reel Picture Show (1998)
Dick Martin	United States	The Cheap Show (1978), Mindreaders (1979–80)
Wink Martindale	United States	What's This Song? (1964–65), Can You Top This? (1970), Words and Music (1970–71), Gambit/Las Vegas Gambit (1972–78 & 1980–81), The New Tic-Tac-Dough/Tic-Tac-Dough (1978–86), Headline Chasers (1985–86), The New High Rollers (1987–88), The Last Word (1989–90), Great Getaway Game (1990–91), Trivial Pursuit (1993–94), Boggle (1994), Shuffle (1994), Debt (1996–98), Instant Recall (2010)
Buck Martinez	Canada	Knockout
Groucho Marx	United States	You Bet Your Life (1950–61), Tell It to Groucho (1962)
Selema Masekela	United States	Ballbreakers (2005–06)
Evanna Maxted	United Kingdom	Clockwise (2022–present)
Kenny Mayne	United States	2 Minute Drill (2000–01)
Simon Mayo	United Kingdom	Scruples (1988–89), Confessions (1995–98), Winning Lines (1999–2000), Blockbusters (2012)
Bill Mazer	United States	Reach for the Stars (1967)
John McCaffery	United States	What's the Story (1953–55), Alumni Fun (1963)
Davina McCall	United Kingdom	God's Gift (1995–96), Prickly Heat (1998), Don't Try This at Home (1998–2001), Streetmate (1998–2001), Oblivious (2001), The Vault (2002), Reborn in the USA (2003), Love on a Saturday Night (2004), Got to Dance (2009–14), The Million Pound Drop (2010–15), Five Minutes to a Fortune (2013), Stepping Out (2013), The Jump (2014–17), One Hundred and Eighty (2015), The £100k Drop (2018–19)
Jenny McCarthy	United States	Singled Out (1995–97)
Johnathan McClain	United States	Sponk! (2001–02)
Fiona McDonald	Australia	It's a Knockout
John McEnroe	United States	The Chair (2002)
Mark McEwen	United States	Wanna Bet? (1993)
Ian McFadyen	Australia	Cluedo (1992–93)
Mac McGarry	United States	It's Academic (1961–2011)
Steph McGovern	United Kingdom	Pocket Money Pitch (2016)
Grace McGuigan	United Kingdom	Grace's Game (2020-present)
Paddy McGuinness	United Kingdom	Take Me Out (2010–present), We Are the Champions (2010), 71 Degrees North (2011), Paddy's Show and Telly (2011–12), Mad Mad World (2012), Your Face Sounds Familiar (2013), Amazing Greys (2014), Benchmark (2015)
Eddie McGuire	Australia	Who Wants to Be a Millionaire? (1999–2006, 2007), 1 vs. 100 (2007–08), Millionaire Hot Seat (2009–present)
Paul McGuire	Canada	Clips (1992–96)
Joel McHale	United States	Card Sharks (2019–2020), Crime Scene Kitchen (2021-present)
Joey McIntyre	United States	Say What? Karaoke (2001)
Willy McIntosh	Thailand	Game Zone (1996-2002), Fantasy Mee Hang (1999-2000), Hollywood Game Night Thailand (2014–16, 2017–present)
Jim McKay	United States	Make The Connection (1955)
Todd McKenney	Australia	You May Be Right (2006–present)
Jim McKrell	United States	The Game Game (1969–70), Celebrity Sweepstakes (1974–75), Quiz Kids (1978)
Bob McLean	Canada	Definition (1974–75)
Ed McMahon	United States	Missing Links (1963–64), Snap Judgment (1967–69), Concentration (1969), Whodunnit? (1979), Star Search (1983-1995)
Rove McManus	Australia	Lie Detectors (2015)
Anthony McPartlin	United Kingdom	Friends Like These (1999–2001), Pop Idol (2001–03), I'm a Celebrity...Get Me Out of Here! (2002–present), Gameshow Marathon (2005), All-Star Cup (2006), PokerFace (2006–07), Britain's Got Talent (2007–present), Ant & Dec's Push the Button (2010–11), Red or Black? (2011–12)
Evgenia Medvedeva	Russia	Ice Age: Kids (2018)
Penélope Menchaca	Mexico	12 Corazones: Rumbo al Altar (2005–17)
Stephen Merchant	United Kingdom	The Crystal Maze (2016)
Randy Merriman	United States	The Big Payoff (1951–53)
David Merry	Canada	Game On (1999–2000)
Wendy Mesley	Canada	Test the Nation (2007–08)
Melinda Messenger	United Kingdom	Beat the Crusher (1998), Fort Boyard (1998–2001)
Michael Miles	United Kingdom	Take Your Pick (1955–68)
Dan Miller	United States	Top Card (1991–93), 10 Seconds (1993–94)
Dennis Miller	United States	Grand Slam (2007), Amne$ia (2008)
Larry Miller	United States	Late Night Liars (2010)
Stephanie Miller	United States	I've Got a Secret (2000–01)
Valarie Rae Miller	United States	Gladiators 2000 (1995–96), Peer Pressure (1997–98)
Olivier Minne	Belgium	La Cible (2003–06), Fort Boyard (2003–present), Intervilles (2013), Pyramide (2014)
Monta Mino	Japan	Who Wants to be a Millionaire (2000–present)
Mir	India	Mirakkel (2006–present)
David Mitchell	United Kingdom	The Bubble (2010), Was It Something I Said? (2013)
Oliver Mlakar	Croatia	Kolo sreće (1993–2002)
Colin Mochrie	Canada	Are You Smarter Than a Canadian 5th Grader? (2007)
Scarlett Moffatt	United Kingdom	Streetmate (2017–present)
Jay Mohr	United States	Lip Service (1992–93)
Hani Mohsin	Malaysia	Roda Impian (2002–06)
Daniella Monet	United States	Paradise Run (2016–18)
Guy Mongrain	Scotland / Canada	La Poule aux oeufs d'or (1993–2018)
Mo'Nique	United States	Queen for a Day (2004 Special)
Bob Monkhouse	United Kingdom	Celebrity Squares, Bob's Full House, Family Fortunes, The $64,000 Question, Wipeout (1998–02), Opportunity Knocks, Bob's Your Uncle, Gagtag, The Golden Shot, Monkhouse's Memory Masters
Cesar Montano	Philippines	The Singing Bee (2008–present)
Tino Monte	Canada	Supermarket Sweep (1992–95)
Derek Mooney	Ireland	Cabin Fever, Gridlock, Winning Streak
Garry Moore	United States	I've Got a Secret (1952–64), To Tell the Truth (1969–77)
Phil Moore	United States	Nick Arcade (1992–93), Nickelodeon All-Star Challenge (1994), and You're On! (1998–99)
Mati Moralejo	United States	Wild & Crazy Kids (2002), Ultimate Blackjack Tour (2016)
Rossi Morreale	United States	Temptation (2007–08), Dating Naked (2016–17)
Lamorne Morris	United States	BrainRush (2009)
Robb Edward Morris	United States	Make the Grade (1990)
Don Morrow	United States	Camouflage (1961–62), Let's Play Post Office (1965–66)
Joseph Motiki	Canada	Reach for the Top (2002–03), Ice Cold Cash (2012)
Stephen Mulhern	United Kingdom	Globo Loco (2003–05), Magic Numbers (2010), The Big Quiz (2011–12; 2016–), Catchphrase (2013–), Big Star's Little Star (2013–), Get Your Act Together (2015), Reality Bites (2015), Pick Me! (2015), Go for It (2016), The Next Great Magician (2016–), In for a Penny (2019–)
Terry David Mulligan	Canada	The New Quiz Kids (1978–79)
Jordan Murphy	United States	Tool Academy (2009–10)
Mike Murphy	Ireland	Mike's Mirco Quizum, Winning Streak
Al Murray (as The Pub Landlord)	United Kingdom	Fact Hunt (2005), Al Murray's Compete for the Meat (2011)
Jan Murray	United States	Meet Your Match (1952), Dollar a Second (1953–54), Treasure Hunt (1956–59), Charge Account, (1960–61)
Fahad Mustafa	Pakistan	Jeeto Pakistan (2014–present)
Hugo Myatt	United Kingdom	Knightmare (1987–94)
Bess Myerson	United States	The Big Payoff (1962)
Clive Myrie	United Kingdom	Mastermind (2021–present), Celebrity Mastermind (2021–present)

== N ==
Host	Country	Game show(s) hosted
Marie-Ange Nardi	France	Pyramid (2001–03), La Cible (2006–present)
Jack Narz	United States	The Price Is Right (1957–58), Dotto (1958), Top Dollar (1958–59), Video Village (1960–61), Seven Keys (1961–64), I'll Bet (1965), Beat the Clock (1969–72), Concentration (1973–79), Now You See It (1974–75)
Niecy Nash	United States	Don't Forget the Lyrics! (2022–present)
Charles Nelson Reilly	United States	Sweethearts (1988–89)
Jimmy Nelson	United States	Bank on the Stars (1954)
Bert Newton	Australia	New Faces, Superquiz, Bert's Family Feud (2006)
Todd Newton	United States	Hollywood Showdown (1999–2001), Whammy! The All-New Press Your Luck (2002–03), Powerball Instant Millionaire (2002–04), Family Game Night (2010–14), Monopoly Millionaires' Club (2015–16)
Frank Nicotero	United States	Street Smarts (2000–05), The Game of Life (2011–12)
Phanya Nirunkul	Thailand	Plick Lock (1983–89), Ching 100 Ching 1000000 (1990-2018), Game Kae Jon (1998-2003), Fan Pan Tae (2000–06), Tod Sa Gun Game (2003-08), Black Box (2005–08), One Night Genius (2006-07), Yok Siam (2008–11)
Sam Nixon	United Kingdom	Who Wants to Be a Superhero? (2009), Skate Nation (2009–10), Copycats (2009–12; 2016–present), Jump Nation (2010), Glee Club (2011–14), Sam and Mark's Geordie Challenge (2014), Sam & Mark's Sport Showdown (2014), Junior Bake Off (2015–present), Taking the Next Step (2017–present)
Graham Norton	United Kingdom	Carnal Knowledge (1996), Bring Me the Head of Light Entertainment (1997–98), Strictly Dance Fever (2005–06), The Generation Game (2005), How Do You Solve a Problem Like Maria? (2006), The Big Finish with Graham Norton (2006), When Will I Be Famous? (2007), Any Dream Will Do (2007), Eurovision Dance Contest (2007–08), The One and Only (2008), I'd Do Anything (2008), Eurovision: Your Country Needs You (2009–10), Totally Saturday (2009), Over the Rainbow (2010), Let It Shine (2017); Wheel of Fortune (2024-present)

== O ==
Host	Country	Game show(s) hosted
Ken Ober	United States	Remote Control (1987–91), MTV Rock N' Jock (1990), Make Me Laugh (1997), Smush (2001)
Dara Ó Briain	United Kingdom	Mock the Week (2005–2022), Dara Ó Briain: School of Hard Sums (2012–14), All About Two (2014), Robot Wars (2016–present), Dara O Briain's Go 8 Bit (2016–present)
Richard O'Brien	United Kingdom	The Crystal Maze (1990–93)
Jerry O'Connell	United States	Pictionary (2022–present)
Kevin O'Connell	United States	Go (1983–84), Keynotes (1986)
Des O'Connor	United Kingdom	Spot the Tune (1956), For Love or Money (1961), Take Your Pick (1992–98), Pot of Gold (1993–95), On the Spot (2000), Countdown (2007–08),
Tom O'Connor	United Kingdom	Crosswits (1987–98)
Melvin Odoom	United Kingdom	Bang on the Money (2016), Masters of Lego (2017)
Ore Oduba	United Kingdom	Ultimate Sports Day (2012), And They're Off (2018-present)
Paul O'Grady	United Kingdom	Blankety Blank (1997–2002) (as Lily Savage), Love Bites (1999) (as Lily Savage), Coronation Street: The Big 50 (2010), Blind Date (2017–2019)
John O'Hurley	United States	To Tell the Truth (2000–02), The Great American Celebrity Spelling Bee (2004), Family Feud (2006–10), Secret Talents of the Stars (2008)
Andrew O'Keefe	Australia	Deal or No Deal (2004–13), The Rich List (2007–09), The Chase Australia (2015–2021)
Dermot O'Leary	United Kingdom	Born to Win (2003–04), Shattered (2004), 1 vs. 100 (2006–07), The X Factor (2007–14; 16-18), The Marriage Ref (2011), The Getaway Car (2016)
Mike O'Malley	United States	Get the Picture (1991–93), Guts/Global GUTS/Nickelodeon GUTS (1992–95), and Nickelodeon All-Star Challenge (1994)
Shaquille O'Neal	United States	Lucky 13 (2024)
Apolo Ohno	United States	Minute to Win It (2013–14)
Fergie Olver	Canada	Just Like Mom (1980–87)
Omarosa	United States	The Ultimate Merger (2010)
Paweł Orleański	Poland	Daję słowo (2006-2007), Lingo (2007), Przetrwanie (2008), The Wall (2017–present)
Richard Osman	United Kingdom	Pointless (2009–present), Two Tribes (2014–15), Child Genius (2016–present), Richard Osman's House of Games (2017–present), Turnabout (2021–present)
Donny Osmond	United States / United Kingdom	Pyramid (2002–04), Donny's Pyramid Game (2007), Identity (2007), The Great American Dream Vote (2007)
Gary Owens	United States	Letters to Laugh-In (1969), The Gong Show (1976–77)
Orlin Goranov	Bulgaria	Posledniyat Pecheli (The last wins, Последният печели)

== P ==
Host	Country	Game show(s) hosted
Jack Paar	United States	Up to Paar (1952), Bank on the Stars (1953)
Rustom Padilla	Philippines	Wheel of Fortune (2001–02)
Mikki Padilla	United States	Catch 21 (2008–11)
Amy Paffrath	United States	Dating Naked (2014–15)
Robert Paige	United States	The Big Payoff (1957–59, 1962)
Jesse Palmer	Canada	The Proposal (2018), The Ultimate Surfer (2022)
Keke Palmer	United States	Password (2022–present)
Adrian Pang	Singapore	Deal or No Deal (2007–08)
Tom Papa	United States	The Marriage Ref (2010), Duck Quacks Don't Echo (2014), Boom! (2015)
Benjie Paras	Philippines	Win Win Win (2007–present)
Jimmy Pardo	United States	Race to Escape (2015)
Jim Paredes	Philippines	Islands Gamemasters (1990–92)
Lew Parker	United States	Your Surprise Store (1952)
Bert Parks	United States	Balance Your Budget (1952–53), The Big Payoff (1953–55), Yours for a Song (1961–63)
Steve Parr	New Zealand	Sale of the Century (1989–95)
Nicholas Parsons	United Kingdom	Sale of the Century (1971–83)
Stivi Paskoski (as Johnny Arcade)	United States	Video Power (1991–92)
Joe Pasquale	United Kingdom	The Price Is Right (2006–07), BingoLotto (2008)
Dan Patrick	United States	Sports Jeopardy! (2014–2016)
Roderick Paulate	Philippines	Game Na, Game Na! (1994–96)
Jeremy Paxman	United Kingdom	University Challenge (1994–present)
Melissa Peachey	United States	PlayMania (2006–07)
Ron Pearson	United States	Skedaddle (1988), Shopping Spree (1996–98)
Jim Peck	United States	The Big Showdown (1974–75), Hot Seat (1976), Second Chance (1977), You Don't Say! (1978–79), Three's A Crowd (1979–80), The Joker's Wild (1981–86 as sub-host)
Aaron Pedersen	Australia	Gladiators
Carlos PenaVega	United States	Webheads (2014–15)
Kevin Pereira	United States	Let's Ask America (2012–15)
Sue Perkins	United Kingdom	Casting Couch (1999), Mission Improbable (2001), The Big Food Fight (2009), The Great British Bake Off (2010–16), Insert Name Here (2016–present), The Big Spell (2017), Let's Sing and Dance (2017–present), The Generation Game (2017–present)
Jim Perry	United States / Canada	It's Your Move (1967), Eye Bet (1971), Headline Hunters (1972–83), Definition (1975–89), Card Sharks (1978–81), Sale of the Century (1983–89)
Jon Pertwee	United Kingdom	Whodunnit? (1974–78)
Melissa Peterman	United States	The Singing Bee (2009–12), Bet on Your Baby (2013–14); PunchLine (2019)
Kai Pflaume	Germany	The Lego Show, Dalli Dalli
Regis Philbin	United States	The Neighbors (1975–76), Almost Anything Goes (1976), Who Wants To Be A Millionaire (1999–2002, 2009), Who Wants to Be a Super Millionaire (2004), America's Got Talent (2006), Million Dollar Password (2008–09)
Ed Phillips	Australia	Temptation (2005–08), Battle of the Sexes, Pot of Gold
Jeff Phillips	Australia	My Generation
Charlie Pickering	Australia	Cash Cab
Jörg Pilawa	Germany	Rette Die Million, It's Your Chance of a Lifetime (Germany)
Nancy Pimental	United States	Win Ben Stein's Money (2000–02)
Henry Polic II	United States	Double Talk (1986)
Kevin Pollak	United States	Million Dollar Money Drop (2010–11), Our Little Genius (2010)
Su Pollard	United Kingdom	Take the Plunge (1989)
Hart Pomerantz	Canada	Double Up (1974)
Michael Pope	Australia	Blockbusters (1990–93)
Maury Povich	United States	Twenty One (2000)
Jenny Powell	United Kingdom	Wordplay (2009)
Dave Price	United States	The Price Is Right
Marc Price	United States	Teen Win, Lose or Draw (1990–92)
Rani Price	United Kingdom	Best of Friends (2004–08)
Jonathan Prince	United States	Quiz Kids Challenge (1990)
Jeff Probst	United States	Rock & Roll Jeopardy! (1998–2001), Survivor (2000–present)
Greg Proops	United States	Space Cadets (1997), Vs. (1999), Rendez-View (2001), Head Games (2009–10)
Dina Pugliese	Canada	Muchmusic VJ Search: The Series (2006)
Sarah Purcell	United States	The Better Sex (1977–78)

== Q ==
Host	Country	Game show(s) hosted
Richard Quest	United Kingdom	500 Questions (2015) (United States)
Allan Quilantang a.k.a. Allan K.	Philippines	Sing Galing (1999–2004), The Weakest Link (2002–03), All Star K! (2006–present)
Colin Quinn	United States	Remote Control
Rufa Mae Quinto	Philippines	Whammy! Push Your Luck (2007–08)
Faisal Qureshi	Pakistan	Jeet Ka Dum (2015)

== R ==
Host	Country	Game show(s) hosted
Clark Race	United States	The Parent Game (1972–73)
Bill Rafferty	United States	Every Second Counts (1984), Card Sharks (1986–87), Blockbusters (1987)
Jaya Ramsey	Philippines	All Star K! (2006–present)
Walter Raney	United States	What's the Story (1951)
Anita Rani	United Kingdom	Four Rooms (2011–15)
Ahmad Rashad	United States	Caesars Challenge (1993–94), The Mole (2003–04), Tug of Words (2021)
Luis Raúl	Puerto Rico	Pa' Que Te Lo Goces (2006)
Raven-Symoné	United States	Scrabble (2024–25)
Robin Ray	United Kingdom	Call My Bluff (1965–66)
Tanika Ray as "(Cyber) Lucy"	United States	Wheel 2000 (1997–98)
Gene Rayburn	United States	Make the Connection (1955), The Match Game (1962–69), The Amateur's Guide to Love (1972), Match Game '73-Match Game '79/Match Game PM (1973–82), Match Game-Hollywood Squares Hour (co-hosted with Jon Bauman) (1983–84), Break the Bank (1985), The Movie Masters (1989–90)
Michael Reagan	United States	Lingo (1987–88)
Simon Reeve	Australia	Quiz Master, It's Academic (2006)
Vic Reeves	United Kingdom	Shooting Stars (1993–2011), Families at War (1998–99), Lucky Sexy Winners (2012)
Marco Antonio Regil	Mexico / United States	The Price Is Right (Mexico, 1997–2000, 2010), Family Feud (2001-06 Mexico, 2006-08, and 2013 US Spanish), Are You Smarter Than a 5th Grader? (2009), Minute to Win It (2012 Spanish), The Wall (2020 US Spanish)
Lee Reherman	United States	BattleBots (1999), RollerJam (1999–01), Cannonball Run 2001 (2001)
Charles Nelson Reilly	United States	Sweethearts (1988–89)
Mike Reilly	United States	Monopoly (1990)
Leah Remini	United States	People Puzzler (2021–23)
Paul Reubens	United States	You Don't Know Jack (2001)
Willie Revillame	Philippines	Puso O Pera (2004), Wowowee (2005–2010), Willing Willie (2010–11), Wil Time Bigtime (2011–2013), Wowowillie (2013), Wowowin (2015–present)
Caroline Rhea	Canada / United States	The Biggest Loser (2004–06), Caroline & Friends (2017)
Mark Rhodes	United Kingdom	Who Wants to Be a Superhero? (2009), Skate Nation (2009–10), Copycats (2009–12; 2016–present), Jump Nation (2010), Glee Club (2011–14), Sam and Mark's Geordie Challenge (2014), Sam & Mark's Sport Showdown (2014), Junior Bake Off (2015–present), Taking the Next Step (2017–present)
Alfonso Ribeiro	United States	GSN Live (2008–09), Catch 21 (2008–11, 2019–20), Spell-Mageddon (2013), Dancing with the Stars (2022–present)
Mike Richards	United States	Beauty and the Geek (2006-2008), The Pyramid (2012), Divided (2017–18), Jeopardy! (2021)
Shane Richie	United Kingdom	Caught in the Act (1992), Win, Lose or Draw (1994), Lucky Numbers (1995–97), Love Me Do (1995–97), Don't Forget the Lyrics! (2008–09), Reflex (2014), Win Your Wish List (2014–16), Decimate (2015–present)
Daniel Richler	Canada	Reach for the Top (2001–04)
Andy Richter	United States	Big Fan (2017)
Glenn Ridge	Australia	Sale of the Century (1991–2001)
Kelly Ripa	United States	Generation Gap (2022–present)
Bobby Rivers	United States	Bedroom Buddies (1992)
Brian Robbins	United States	Pictionary (1989)
JD Roberto	United States	Flamingo Fortune (1995–96), You Lie Like a Dog (2000), Shop 'til You Drop (2003–05)
Ken Roberts	United States	Quick as a Flash (1944–51)
Sandy Roberts	Australia	The $1,000,000 Chance of a Lifetime (2000)
Anne Robinson	United Kingdom / United States	Weakest Link (2000–12, UK; 2001–02, USA), Test the Nation
Craig Robinson	United States	Last Comic Standing (2010), The Masked Dancer (2020)
Robert Robinson	United Kingdom	Ask the Family (1967–84), Call My Bluff (1967–88)
Aaron Rodgers	United States	Jeopardy! (2021)
Gina Rodriguez	United States	Lucky 13 (2024)
Paul Rodriguez	Mexico / United States	The Newlywed Game (1988–89)
Joe Rogan	United States	Fear Factor (2001–06; 2011–12), Game Show in My Head (2009)
Matthew Rogers	United States	Beat the Chefs (2012)
Fred Roggin	United States	GSN Live (2008–09), The Money List (2009)
Al Roker	United States	Remember This? (1996–97), Celebrity Family Feud (2008)
Laurent Romejko	France	Des chiffres et des lettres (1992–present)
Rebecca Romijn	United States	Skin Wars (2014–16)
Darrin Rose	Canada	Match Game (2012–13)
Peter Rosenberg	United States	Hip Hop Squares (2012)
Hans Rosenthal	Germany	Dalli Dalli
Jeff Ross	United States	The Burn with Jeff Ross (2012–13)
J. D. Roth	United States	Fun House (1988–91), GamePro TV (1991–92), Double Up (1992), Masters of the Maze (1994), Animal Planet Zooventure (1997), Sex Wars (2000–01), Moolah Beach (2001), Endurance (2002–08), Unan1mous (2006), Opportunity Knocks (2008)
Richard Rubin	United States	Flor de palabra
Adamo Ruggiero	Canada	The Next Star (2008–12)
RuPaul Charles	United States	Gay for Play Game Show Starring RuPaul (2016–17), Lingo (2022-present)
David Ruprecht	United States	Supermarket Sweep (1990–95, 2000–2003)
David Russell	United States	Midway (1952)
Nipsey Russell	United States	Juvenile Jury (1983–84), Your Number's Up (1985)
Maria Teresa Ruta	Italy	The Price Is Right Italy (2001)
Katherine Ryan	United Kingdom	Hair (2015), Your Face or Mine? (2017–present)

== S ==
Host	Country	Game show(s) hosted
John Sachs	United Kingdom	4 Square (1989-1991), Gladiators (1992-2000)
Peter Sagal	United States	Wait Wait... Don't Tell Me! (1999–present)
Bob Saget	United States	1 vs. 100 (2006–08), Nashville Squares (2019)
Pat Sajak	United States	Wheel of Fortune (1981–2024), College Bowl (1984)
Soupy Sales	United States	Junior Almost Anything Goes (1977)
John Salley	United States	I Can't Believe You Said That (1998–99)
Lauren Sánchez	United States	So You Think You Can Dance (2005)
Ed Sanders	United States	National Bingo Night (2007)
Summer Sanders	United States	Figure It Out (1997–99), Beg, Borrow & Deal (2003)
Renee Sands	United States	Great Pretenders (1999–2002)
Tony Sano	Japan	I Survived a Japanese Game Show (2008–09)
Maria Sansone	United States	Gladiators 2000 (1994–96)
Judy Ann Santos	Philippines	Junior MasterChef Pinoy Edition (2011–12), MasterChef Pinoy Edition (2012–13), Bet on Your Baby Philippines(2013–present)
Fred Savage	United States	Child Support (2018)
Nicholas Schimmelpenninck (as Nicholas Picholas)	Canada	Video & Arcade Top 10 (1991–2006)
Jacob Scipio	United Kingdom	Kerwhizz (2008–11)
Michael Schanze	Germany	Spiel ohne Grenzen. : 1, 2 oder 3
Anna Shcherbakova	Russia	Ice Age (2022–23)
Mary Scheer	United States	Most Extreme Elimination Challenge (2013–17)
Phillip Schofield	United Kingdom	Talking Telephone Numbers (1994–97), Tenball (1995), Winning Lines (2001–2004), Test the Nation (2002–06), It's Now or Never (2006), Dancing on Ice (2006–14; 2018–present), All Star Mr & Mrs (2008–2016), The Cube (2009–2015, 2020–21), You're Back in the Room (2015–16), 5 Gold Rings (2017–2020)
Lew Schneider	United States	Make the Grade (1989–90)
Rick Schwartz	United States	The Chamber (2002)
Kara Scott	Canada	High Stakes Poker (2010)
Mark Scott	United States	Home Run Derby (1960)
Stuart Scott	United States	Dream Job (2004–06), Stump the Schwab (2004–06)
Vin Scully	United States	It Takes Two (1969–70)
Ryan Seacrest	United States	Gladiators 2000 (1994–96), Wild Animal Games (1995–96), Click (1997–99), American Juniors (2003), The Million Second Quiz (2013) Wheel of Fortune (2024–present)
Mike Senese	United States	Catch It Keep It (co-hosted with Zack Selwyn) (2009)
Rod Serling	United States	Liar's Club (1969)
Ross Shafer	United States	Love Me, Love Me Not (1986–87) Match Game (1990–91)
Pat Sharp	United Kingdom	Fun House (1989-1999)
William Shatner	Canada / United States	Show Me the Money (2006)
Adam Shaw	United Kingdom	Drive to Buy (2012), Cook Me the Money (2013), Who Repairs Wins (2014)
Harry Shearer	United States	The News Hole (1994)
Brendan Sheerin	United Kingdom	Coach Trip (2005–present), Brendan's Magical Mystery Tour (2013), Brendan's Love Cruise (2013)
Dax Shepard	United States	Spin the Wheel (2019), Family Game Fight! (2022)
Ben Shephard	United Kingdom	Soapstar Superstar (2006–07), DanceX (2007), 1 vs. 100 (2008–09), Who Dares, Sings! (2008), The Krypton Factor (2009–10), Safebreakers (2011), Tipping Point (2012–), Ninja Warrior UK (2014–)
Sherri Shepherd	United States	The Newlywed Game (2010–13), Match Made in Heaven (2015), Match Made in Heaven (2016), Best Ever Trivia Show (2019)
Ned Sherrin	United Kingdom	We Interrupt This Week (1978)
Brad Sherwood	United States	The Dating Game (1996–97), The Big Moment (1999)
Kevin Shinick	United States	Where in Time Is Carmen Sandiego? (1996–98)
Iliza Shlesinger	United States	Excused (2011–13), Separation Anxiety (2016)
Herb Shriner	United States	Two for the Money (1952–56)
Wil Shriner	United States	That's My Dog (1993–94), Small Talk (1996–97)
Ernie Sigley	Australia	Wheel of Fortune (1981–84)
Robert Kilroy Silk	United Kingdom	Shafted (2001)
Peter Simon	United Kingdom	Double Dare (1987-1992), Get the Picture (1994-2000)
Hannah Simone	United Kingdom / Canada	WCG Ultimate Gamer (2009–10), Kicking & Screaming (2017)
Peter Sinclair	New Zealand	University Challenge (1977–89)
Hella von Sinnen	Germany	Alles Nichts Oder?! (1988-1992)
Frank Skinner	United Kingdom	Room 101 (2012–2018), Portrait Artist of the Year (2013–14; 2017–present), Landscape Artist of the Year (2015–present)
Steve Skrovan	United States	That's My Dog (1991–92)
Bill Slater	United States	Messing Prize Party (1948–49)
Peter Snow	United Kingdom	Mastermind (1998–2000)
Julie Snyder	Canada	Deal or No Deal (French language version) (2007–present)
Paul Soles	Canada	Flashback (1962–63), Beyond Reason (1979–80)
Devon Soltendieck	Canada	Pop Quiz (2013–present)
Daryl Somers	Australia	Family Feud (1980–84), Blankety Blanks (1985)
Vic Sotto	Philippines	Who Wants to Be a Millionaire? (2009–)
Nick Spano	United States	Peer Pressure (1997–98)
David Sparks	United States	Crosswits (1986–87)
Hal Sparks	United States	Treasure Mall (1988)
Dave Spikey	United Kingdom	Chain Letters (1997), Bullseye (2006)
Allen Spraggett	Canada	Beyond Reason (1977–79)
Jerry Springer	United Kingdom / United States	Greed (2001), America's Got Talent (2007–08), Baggage (2010–12, 2015)
Gina St. John	United States	Who Knows You Best? (2000–01)
Susan Stafford	United States	Wheel of Fortune (1975–82)
Lisa Stahl	United States	Flamingo Fortune (1995–99)
Tim Steeves	Canada	Game On (1998–99)
Ben Stein	United States	Win Ben Stein's Money (1997–2003)
Jeff Stelling	United Kingdom	Countdown (2009–11), Alphabetical (2016–2017)
Bill Stern	United States	Remember This Date (1950–51), Are You Positive (1952)
Steve-O	United States	Killer Karaoke (2012–13)
Dougal Stevenson	Australia / New Zealand	The Krypton Factor
William G. Stewart	United Kingdom	Fifteen to One (1988–2003), Famous People, Famous Places (1992)
Iain Stirling	United Kingdom	The Dog Ate My Homework (2014–present), CelebAbility (2017–present)
Mike Stokey	United States	Pantomime Quiz (1947–59), Beat the Odds (1961), Stump the Stars (1962–70)
Dwight Stones	United States	Dream League (1994)
Eric Stonestreet	United States	The Toy Box (2017), Domino Masters (2022-present)
Ralph Story	United States	The $64,000 Challenge (1956–58)
Michael Strahan	United States	Pros vs. Joes (2006–10), The $100,000 Pyramid (2016–present)
Teresa Strasser	United States	Lover's Lounge (2000)
Karol Strasburger	Poland	Family Feud Poland (1994–present)
George Stroumboulopoulos	Canada / United States	The One: Making a Music Star (2006), Test the Nation (2010)
Sally Struthers	United States	Win, Lose or Draw (1988, as a sub-host)
Suggs	United Kingdom	Night Fever (1997–2002)
Trish Suhr	United States	GSN Daily Draw
Sandra Sully	Australia	Australia's Brainiest Kid (2005–present)
Marc Summers	United States	Double Dare/Super Sloppy Double Dare (1986–89), Couch Potatoes (1989), Family Double Dare (1990–93), What Would You Do? (1991–93), Pick Your Brain (1993–94), History IQ (2000), WinTuition (2002–04)
Jeff Sutphen	United States	BrainSurge (2009–11), 101 Ways to Leave a Game Show (2011), Figure It Out (2012–13)
Lynn Swann	United States	To Tell The Truth (1990–91)
Alison Sweeney	United States	The Biggest Loser (2007–15)
Catherine Swing	Canada	Just Like Mom (1980–87)
Red Symons	Australia	Shafted (2002)
Tadeusz Sznuk	Poland	Ten (Fifteen) to One Poland (1994–present)

== T ==
Host	Country	Game show(s) hosted
Jimmy Tapp	Canada	A Kin to Win (1961–62), Flashback (1966–68)
Jimmy Tarbuck	United Kingdom	Full Swing (1997)
Chris Tarrant	United Kingdom	Everybody's Equal (1989–91), Cluedo (1991), The Main Event (1993), Lose a Million (1993), Pop Quiz (1994), Man O Man (1996–99), Who Wants To Be a Millionaire? (1998–2013), Spelling Bee (2005), The Great Pretender (2007), It's Not What You Know (2008), The Colour Of Money (2009)
Rip Taylor	United States	The $1.98 Beauty Show (1978–80)
Tim Tebow	United States	Million Dollar Mile (2019)
Charles Templeton	Canada	Live a Borrowed Life (1959–62)
Jan Tennant	Canada	Reach for the Top (1973–83)
Tila Tequila	Singapore / United States	A Shot at Love with Tila Tequila (2007), A Shot at Love II with Tila Tequila (2008)
Deney Terrio	United States	Dance Fever (1979–85)
Gia Thành	United States	Game Show Dong Vang (2020)
Alan Thicke	Canada / United States	First Impressions (1976–77), Animal Crack-Ups (1987–90), Pictionary (1997), All New 3's A Crowd (2000)
Jeff Thisted	United States	PlayMania (2006–07), Quiznation (2007), 100 Winners (2007)
Wim Thoelke	Germany	Der große Preis
Chuck Thomas	United Kingdom	9Live (2004–05), Quizmania (2005–06)
Mark Thompson	United States	Hole in the Wall (2008–09)
Kate Thornton	United Kingdom	Dishes (1999–2000), The X Factor (2004–06), Celebrity Wrestling (2005), The X Factor: Battle of the Stars (2006), Viewer of the Year (2006), Baby Ballroom: The Championship (2007), 71 Degrees North (2010)
Christopher Titus	United States	Pawnography (2014–15)
Larry Toffler	United States	Finders Keepers (1988–89)
Sandi Toksvig	United Kingdom	Antiques Master (2010–11), 1001 Things You Should Know (2012–13), Fifteen to One (2014–present), QI (2016–present), The Great British Bake Off (2017–present)
Selwyn Toogood	New Zealand	It's in the Bag (1950s–1980s)
Peter Tomarken	United States	Hit Man (1983), Press Your Luck (1983–86), Bargain Hunters (1987), Wipeout (1988–89), Prime Games (1994–96), Paranoia (2000)
Aisha Toussaint	United Kingdom	Raven (2017–present)
Fred Travalena	United States	Anything For Money (1984–85), Baby Races (1993–94)
Ty Treadway	United States	Merv Griffin's Crosswords (2007–08)
Alex Trebek	Canada / United States	Reach for the Top (1966–73), The Wizard of Odds (1973–74), High Rollers (1974–76 & 1978–80), Double Dare (1976–77), The $128,000 Question (1977–78), Pitfall (1981–82), Battlestars (1981–82 & 1983), Jeopardy! (1984–2020), Classic Concentration (1987–91), Super Jeopardy! (1990) To Tell the Truth (1991)
John Bartholomew Tucker	United States	Treasure Isle (1967–1968)
Edward Tudor-Pole	United Kingdom	The Crystal Maze (1993–95)
Sheldon Turcott	Canada	TimeChase (1997–99)
Ian Turpie	Australia	The Price Is Right, (1981–85, 1989), Press Your Luck (1987–88), Supermarket Sweep Australia (1992–94)
Bill Turnbull	United Kingdom	Think Tank (2016)
Aisha Tyler	United States	The 5th Wheel (2001–04), Whose Line Is It Anyway? (2013–present)
Angelle Tymon	United States	PlayMania (2007)

== U ==
Host	Country	Game show(s) hosted
Michael Underwood	United Kingdom	Eliminator (2003–04), Starfinder (2003–04), Jungle Run (2003–06), Bingo Night Live (2008), Let Me Entertain You (2014)
Hubert Urbański	Poland	Who Wants to be a Millionaire (1999–2003; 2008–present)
Adrián Uribe	Mexico	Family Feud (2009)

== V ==
Host	Country	Game show(s) hosted
Bobby Van	United States	Showoffs (1975), The Fun Factory (1976), Make Me Laugh (1979–80)
J. Keith van Straaten	United States	Beat the Geeks (2001)
Matt Vasgersian	United States	Sports Geniuses (co-hosted with Lisa Guerrero) (2000), Celebrity Blackjack (co-hosted with Alex Borstein) (2004–05), World Series of Blackjack (2004–07)
Johnny Vaughan	United Kingdom	My Kind of Town (2005)
Jesse Ventura	United States	The Grudge Match (1991)
Meredith Vieira	United States	Who Wants To Be a Millionaire (2002–13), 25 Words or Less (2019–present)
Tim Vincent	United Kingdom	There's Something About Miriam (2004), I'm Famous and Frightened! (2004)
Jeremy Vine	United Kingdom	Eggheads (2008–present), Revenge of the Egghead (2014), Make Me an Egghead (2016)
Tim Vine	United Kingdom	Housemates (1995), Whittle (1997–98), Fluke (1997), Don't Blow the Inheritance (2012)
Theo Von	United States	Deal with It (2013–14)

== W ==
Host	Country	Game show(s) hosted
Adam Wade	United States	Musical Chairs (1975)
Dwyane Wade	United States	The Cube (2021–present)
Jill Wagner	United States	Wipeout (2008–11, 2013–14)
Mark L. Walberg	United States	Free 4 All (1994), The Big Date (1996–97), Pyramid (2002, unaired pilot), Russian Roulette (2002–03), On The Cover (2004–05), The Moment of Truth (2008–09), Make Me a Millionaire (2009–10), The Game Plane (2014–15)
Mal Walden	Australia	Jeopardy
Bill Walker	Canada	Communicate (1966–67), Party Game (1970–81)
Roy Walker	United Kingdom	Catchphrase (1986–99)
Mike Wallace	United States	Majority Rules (1949–50), Guess Again (1951), I'll Buy That (1953–54), Who's the Boss (1954), The Big Surprise (1956–57), Who Pays? (1959)
Pamela Wallin	Canada	Who Wants to Be a Millionaire? (2000)
Bradley Walsh	United Kingdom	The Midas Touch (1995), Wheel of Fortune (1997), Spin Star (2008), The Chase (2009–present), Odd One In (2010–11), Keep It in the Family (2014–15), Cash Trapped (2016–2019)
Robin Ward	Canada / United States	To Tell the Truth (1980–81), Guess What (1983–87)
Kirsty Wark	United Kingdom	The Book Quiz (2008)
Marlon Wayans	United States	Funniest Wins (2014)
Patrick Wayne	United States	Tic-Tac-Dough (1990)
Nick Weir	United Kingdom	Catchphrase (2000–02)
Robb Weller	United States	Win, Lose or Draw (1989–90)
Betty White	United States	Just Men! (1983)
Jaleel White	United States	Total Blackout (2012–13), Flip Side (2024–present)
Vanna White	United States	Wheel of Fortune (1982–present)
Richard Whiteley	United Kingdom	Countdown (1982-2005)
Mike Whitney	Australia	Gladiators, Who Dares Wins
Dennis Wholey	United States	The Generation Gap (1969)
Richard Wilkins	Australia	Keynotes (1992–93)
Wendy Williams	United States	Love Triangle (2011)
Austin Willis	Canada	QED (1960)
Emma Willis	United Kingdom	Girlfriends (2012–13), Big Brother (2013–2018), Celebrity Big Brother (2013–2018), Prize Island (2013), The Voice UK (2014–present), Prized Apart (2015)
Justin Willman	United States	Scrabble Showdown (2011–12), Win, Lose or Draw (2014)
Holly Willoughby	United Kingdom	Dancing on Ice (2006–11; 2018), Streetmate (2007), The Voice UK (2012–13), Play to the Whistle (2015–17), Meet the Parents (2016–present)
Carnie Wilson	United States	The Newlywed Game (2009–10)
Flip Wilson	United States	People Are Funny (1984)
Rebel Wilson	Australia / United States	Pooch Perfect (2020-2022)
Paul Winchell	United States	Runaround (1972–73)
Claudia Winkleman	United Kingdom	Three's a Crowd (2003), Talking Telephone Numbers (1997), God's Gift (1996/97), Fanorama (2002–03)
Gruntilda Winkybunion	United States	Grunty's Furnace Fun (1998) Tower of Tragedy (2000)
Dale Winton	United Kingdom	Dale's Supermarket Sweep (1993–2001, 2007), Pets Win Prizes (1995–96), The Other Half (1997–2002), Touch the Truck (2001), In It to Win It (2002–2016), Hole in the Wall (2008), Dale's Great Getaway (2012)
Duncan Wisbey (as Dr. Brain)	United Kingdom	Ultimate Brain (2014–present)
Terry Wogan	United Kingdom	Jackpot (1964–65), Ask a silly Answer (1977), Blankety Blank (1979–1983), You Must Be Joking! (1981), Wogan's Perfect Recall (2008–2010)
Annie Wood	United States	Bzzz! (1996–97)
Gene Wood	United States	Anything You Can Do (1971–72), Beat the Clock (1972–74)
Edward Woodward	United Kingdom	Whodunnit? (1973)
Chuck Woolery	United States	Wheel of Fortune (1975–81), Love Connection (1983–94), Scrabble (1984–90, 1993), The Dating Game (1997–2000), Pyramid (1997, unsold pilot), Greed (1999–2000), Lingo (2002–07), Chuck Woolery: Naturally Stoned (2003), Think Like a Cat (2008)
Kari Wuhrer	United States	Remote Control (1988–89)

== Y ==
Host	Country	Game show(s) hosted
Alexei Yagudin	Russia	Ice Age (2013–)
Leonid Yakubovich	Russia	Pole Chudes (1991–)
Scott Yaphe (Wink Yahoo)	Canada	Uh Oh! (1997–2003)
Reggie Yates	United Kingdom	Dance Factory (2005), Keep Your Hair On: Celebrity Scissorhands (2006), Get 100 (2007), Move Like Michael Jackson (2009), The Voice UK (2012–13), Release the Hounds (2013–17), Prized Apart (2015), Special Forces: Ultimate Hell Week (2017–present)
Jomari Yllana	Philippines	Philippines' Scariest Challenge (2008–)
Li Yong	People's Republic of China	Lucky 52, Super 6+1, Chinese Dream
Jessica York	United States	PlayMania (2006–07), 100 Winners (2007)
Elwy Yost	Canada	The Superior Sex (1961)
Michael Young	United States	Flamingo Fortune (1996–99)
Stephen Young	Canada	Just Like Mom (1979–80)

== Z ==
Host	Country	Game show(s) hosted
Tania Zaetta	Australia	Who Dares Wins
Alina Zagitova	Russia	Ice Age (2020–)
Alex Zane	United Kingdom	Bamboozle (2005), House of Games (2006), Celebrity Scissorhands (2006), Orange unsignedAct (2007–08)
Iva Zanicchi	Italy	The Price Is Right (1987–2000)
Sonja Zietlow	Germany	The Weakest Link, I'm a Celebrity - Get Me Out of Here!

== Bibliography ==
- David Schwartz, Steve Ryan & Fred Wostbrock, The Encyclopedia of TV Game Shows – 3rd Edition, Checkmark Books, ISBN 0-8160-3846-5
