= Dealer's choice (disambiguation) =

Dealer's choice may refer to:

- Dealer's choice, a style of poker
- Dealer's Choice (play), a play by Patrick Marber
- Dealer's Choice (game show), a game show hosted by Jack Clark
- Dealer's Choice (quartet), a barbershop quartet
- "Dealer's Choice" (Frankie Drake Mysteries), a 2018 television episode
- "Dealer's Choice" (The Twilight Zone), a 1985 television episode
