= Sex Wars =

Sex Wars can refer to:

- The Feminist Sex Wars of the late 1970s through the 1980s
- Sex wars, a novel by Stanisław Lem
- Sex Wars (game show), an American game show that ran from 2000 to 2001
- Sex Wars, a novel by Marge Piercy
- Sex Wars (film), a film by Bob Vosse in 1985
