= Ooops! (Canadian game show) =

Canadian children's television series

- Genre: Children's game show
- Presented by: Harry Brown
- Country of origin: Canada
- Original language: English
- No. of seasons: 1

Production
- Producer: Sandy Stewart
- Running time: 30 minutes

Original release
- Network: CBC Television
- Release: 29 September 1970 – 29 June 1971

Ooops! is a Canadian children's game show that aired on CBC Television from 1970 to 1971.

== Premise ==
Harry Brown, known on the series as the "Great Drake", hosted this game show from various Canadian cities, often with the assistance of local presenters. The set contained a large game board on which contestants moved forward or backward based on the audience response to a given riddle or joke. Game winners chose their prize from six mystery bags, most of which were prizes such as radios, recordings or books, but one bag contained a duck as a booby prize. Children participated in the game by mailing in riddles and jokes to be used for the game segment, and they could also purchase a home version from the CBC.

The series included a parody news and weather segment hosted by John O'Leary entitled "Ooops! Nooos" and "Ooops! Weather For Ducks".

== Scheduling ==
This half-hour series was broadcast on Tuesdays at 5:00 p.m. (Eastern) from 29 September 1970 to 29 June 1971.
