= Guy Mongrain =

Canadian game show host (born 1953)

Guy Mongrain (born April 21, 1953) is a Canadian game show host and former reporter. He is mostly known for hosting several popular Quebec television games on the network TVA for the past 20 years.

== Career ==
Mongrain started his media career as a news radio anchor in 1977 and made his television debut in 1981. He was a contributor to several shows on TVA including Midi Soleil, Bonjour matin and Samedi magazine. Mongrain hosted a quiz game for the first time in 1987 when hosting Quebec a la carte, which had a quiz game related to Quebec tourism. He hosted the show for less than a year until it ended in 1988. Then he would later host Charivari for over four years until 1992. He would later host Fort Boyard from 1994 to 2001 as well as Vingt-et-un, which lasted only one season. From 1993 to 2018, he was the host of the Loto-Québec televised lottery game La Poule aux œufs d'or.

For over 12 years from 1991 to 2004, he was also the host of the TVA morning show Salut, Bonjour! which included news, editorials, entertainment and various guests and special events.

He also had minor cameo appearances in several television series including Sous les jacquettes in 2005 and Taxi 0-22 in 2007.
