= One Night Genius =

- Created by: Rungtham Phumsinil
- Developed by: Workpoint Entertainment Public Co., Ltd.
- Starring: Tankhun Jitissara (2006-07-03-2008-01-07); Phanya Nirunkul (2006-07-03-2007-03-05)
- Country of origin: Thailand
- Original language: Thai
- No. of episodes: 72

Production
- Executive producer: Rungtham Phumsinil
- Camera setup: Multi-camera
- Running time: 60 minutes

Original release
- Network: Channel 3
- Release: July 3, 2006 – January 7, 2008

One Night Genius (Thai: อัจฉริยะข้ามคืน) is the first Thailand reality quiz show, on Thai TV Channel 3. First broadcasting on July 3, 2006. Present by Phanya Nirunkul and Tankhun Jitissara. Production by Workpoint Entertainment Public Company Limited. In every week, 8 competitors from 8 branches of professions have competed in the contest for the 1 million baht prize (approx. $30,000) and the place where the contest is held have been changed every week.

== Rules ==
=== Before the mission ===
- The 8 competitors who were called "genius" will come together and receive the "lifesaving" bag from the host. In the lifesaving bag, there will be 8 boxes which had
  - food and eating equipment
  - lighting equipment and Pliers
  - consumer goods
  - memo equipment
  - cutting, pasting and wrapping equipment
  - a mobile phone which can be used only once for 1 minute
  - special equipment (changed every week, like clay or rope)
  - a puzzle that will be used in the mission 3.
- Sometimes, some equipment is changed.
- A special expert from the place where the contest is held will take the genius to visit the place and told the information of the place which can be used for every mission.
- 8 geniuses will go to the place that the host allot for resting, memoring or decrypting the puzzle.

=== Mission 1 ===
Usually in the first mission of One Night Genius, the 8 geniuses either perform the mission as individuals or in pairs. Missions that go by the individual rule includes answering 20 questions, setting up Jenga towers, etc.

A more common way to the first mission is having the 8 geniuses splitting into 4 teams of 2. Only the 3 best teams from this point proceeds to the next mission. Missions that undertake this rule includes sending signals, knock down 100 birds in one shot of a toy gun, cushion an egg for a 40m drop, pop 100 balloons with one throw of dart..etc.

=== Mission 2 ===
- Second mission change every week. It has 2 versions that is
  - The individual mission - 6 geniuses will do the mission alone such as answering 20 questions, set up a Jenga tower and don't make them fall etc. The 4 geniuses who can do the mission accomplished will pass to the next mission.
  - The team mission - 6 geniuses will take apart into the 3 teams. Each team must do the mission together. The 2 teams which can do the mission accomplished will pass to the next mission.

=== Mission 3 ===
- The 4 remain geniuses must crack the puzzle in their lifesaving bag themselves and find the only 1 correct box in 100 plastic boxes. If geniuses find the correct box they will receive the "genius password" to crack into 4 digit numbers to open the safe. However, if geniuses choose the wrong box or answer the question in their safes incorrectly they will be eliminated.
- This "genius password" is considered as hi-light of game each week. Most passwords commonly use tricks in Thai language to crack them. Here are examples of passwords which are able to be explained in English.
  - Tuk-Tuk in whole country with victory (ตุ๊กตุ๊กทั่วประเทศสู้ตาย) - 3762 (Tuk-Tuk has 3 wheels, Thailand has 76 provinces and victory is commonly with V-sign which has 2 fingers used)
  - Press over the star then turn right (กดเหนือดาราเลี้ยวขวาเมื่อสุด) - 7412 (Use Mobile phone's keypad to solve this password, start by press 7 which is above the star button, continue going up through 4 and 1 then turn right to 2)
  - 007 - 2017 (This password is needed to solve by simply reading as two zeroes, one seven. Geniuses in this episode were tricked with James Bond's related)
  - Ah-Un-Uh-Uh-Un (อ่างอึ่งอ๋องอ๋องอึ่ง) - 1221 (Ah means this password comes with Ah voice, then the sounds of this password is similar with One-Two-Two-One)
- The first 2 geniuses who answer the question in their safes correctly will proceed to the "Final Mission".

=== Final Mission ===
- The 2 remain geniuses will come to the Workpoint Studio in Phatumthani, Thailand for the final mission. Geniuses will face Phanya Nirunkul who was hosting the final mission.
- Geniuses must answer the 1 question that Phanya Nirunkul ask. Each genius can answer only twice. If any genius can answer correctly, That genius will become the "One Night Genius" and win the 1 million baht prize. However, if genius answer incorrectly twice, the other genius will become the One Night Genius and win the 1 million baht prize.
- The One Night Genius will receive the 1 million baht prize in the variation of KTC's credit card from Krung Thai Card Public Co., Ltd. which can deposit from credit card or use it which amount 1 million baht. The variation of 1 million baht prize has 3 variations that is:
  - KTC Titanium MasterCard (Episode 1 - Episode 7)
  - KTC Visa Platinum (Episode 8 - Episode 27)
  - KTC Cash's Credit which gift 1 million baht cash. (Episode 28 - Episode 35)
  - KTC Millon's Credit which gift 1 million baht cash. (Episode 36 - Episode 44)
  - KTC I am MasterCard (Episode 45 - Episode 48)
  - Honda which gift 1 million baht cash. (Episode 49 - 72)
