= Gia Thành =

Vietnamese American host and writer

- Born: Nguyễn Công Thành; 1984 (age 41–42); Quang Tri Province, Vietnam
- Other names: Công Thành, Thành Công
- Occupations: MC, host, writer

Gia Thanh (born Nguyễn Công Thành, 1984) is a Vietnamese American master of ceremonies (MC), talk show host, game show host, writer and TV producer for Vietnamese language TV stations, newspapers in the United States. He often writes under pen names such as "Thành Công" or “Công Thành.”

== Career ==
MC Gia Thành, pen name Thành Công, interviewed one of the founders of Vietnam's start-up community, Former Vice President Business & Technology IDG Ventures Vietnam Nguyễn Hồng Trường for Saigon Times Group. He is considered one of the most inspirational business leaders in Vietnam's start-up community.

Gia Thanh is a Vietnamese American game show host who has hosted the Game Show Đồng Vàng that airs on Saigon TV 57.5 based in California. This is the Vietnamese language game show produced oversea by Saigon TV, NN Channel and S365 USA Trading. The game show premiered on April 18, 2020. Gia Thanh has said, in some interviews, that he learned his TV hosting skills from some of the Vietnamese film directors such as Xuan Phuoc, Cuong Ngo, Huynh Tuan Anh and from watching American television personalities at Universal Studios Hollywood in Los Angeles, California.

Game show Dong Vang, which directed by Xuân Phước, consists of two teams of three, including celebrity guests, guessing the right answers to fill-in-the-blank Vietnamese folk verses and proverbs questions. It featured many Vietnamese celebrities, singers, actors and models... such as Châu Tuấn, Bích Thảo, Kim Hiền, Trần Bảo Ngọc, Võ Thành Tâm, Hoàng Anh...

Throughout his career, Gia Thanh has interviewed many U.S. government officials and successful Vietnamese Americans in the United States, such as Major General Frank Muth, California State Assembly Assemblymember Tyler Diep, United States Public Health Service Commissioned Corps Thiếu Tá Nguyễn Minh Thục Đoan, Vietnamese American Idol contestant Myra Tran, United States Congressman Harley Rouda, Orange County Clerk-Recorder Hugh Nguyen, the first Vietnamese American soccer player on United States national soccer team Lee Nguyen, Regional Manager for the Americas of the German National Tourist Board Ricarda Lindner, United States Ambassador to Vietnam Daniel Kritenbrink...

He has also interviewed many representatives for American companies in Vietnam, such as Former Vice President Business & Technology, IDG Ventures Vietnam Nguyễn Hồng Trường and other Vietnamese representatives for Google, Intel...

== Personal life ==
In an interview published in August 2020, Gia Thanh says he was born in Quảng Trị Province, Vietnam and lived in Nebraska for over 10 years before moving to California.
