= Home version =

Adaptation of a game show as a board or video game

A home version of a game show is an adaptation of the televised game meant for home use. The home version is often in the form of a board game or, more recently, a video game or DVD TV game.

== History ==
Game show home games have been released alongside game and quiz shows ever since the advent of these shows on radio. As game shows became more popular with their transition from radio to television, game show board games became popular as well. Milton Bradley began annually updating their home adaptations of popular game shows in the late 1950s due to their popularity.

As game shows started to see a drop in popularity in the 1980s, so did their home versions. The 2000s saw a comeback of game shows, bringing with it a rise in popularity in home game show adaptations. This new wave of adaptation came in a variety of formats, including video games and DVD TV games.
