= The Singing Office =

Television series

The Singing Office is a television series that has an American and Australian version. It features ordinary citizens who form singing groups in their workplaces, then compete against other teams; the rights to the concept have been sold to 20 countries.

== Australian version ==
The Australian version is hosted by comedians Nick Giannopoulos and Julia Morris. The television series aired in 13 parts on Fox8. Each week, there were two groups made up of five office coworkers. Both companies competed in a one-hour singing competition. Judges decided each week's winner. Twelve groups competed in the finale for a trophy.

Giannopoulos first turned down the show until he saw the Dutch pilot, which he thought was different and fun. He said that the contestants are "uniquely Australian" and that they are very similar to who people work with.

== American version ==
Ex-Spice Girl Melanie Brown and ex-NSYNC member Joey Fatone hosted the American television series, which aired on TLC. Groups of contestants were chosen with the five best coworkers. Each group of contestants had vocal coaches and choreographers before they competed against each other in front of a live studio audience. Travis Payne, Taylor Dayne, and Jon Secada judged the contestants and the winning team received $50,000. Brown said that it is not a serious competition like American Idol or Dancing with the Stars.

=== Episodes ===
No.	Title	Original release date
1	"Elementary School vs. Hotel"	June 29, 2008
A singing competition between an elementary school and a hotel.
2	"1-800-DENTIST vs. Beauty Salon"	July 6, 2008
A singing competition between a dental referral service and a beauty salon.
3	"Airline vs. Zoo"	July 13, 2008
A singing competition between JetBlue and the Los Angeles Zoo.
4	"Animal Shelter vs. School Bus Drivers"	July 20, 2008
A singing competition between the SPCALA and the Pupil Transportation Cooperative.
5	"Auto Dealership vs. Realty Company"	July 27, 2008
A singing competition between Prudential Realty and Galphin Motors.
6	"Restaurant vs. Jeweler"	August 3, 2008
A singing competition between the Anaheim White House restaurant and Robbins Brothers.
7	"Electronics Company vs. Grocery Store"	August 10, 2008
A singing competition between Westinghouse Digital and Hows Market.
8	"Aquarium vs. Mattress Store"	August 17, 2008
A singing competition between Aquarium of the Pacific and Sit 'n Sleep.
9	"Finale"	August 24, 2008
Eight companies compete for $50,000.

== Legal ==
The CEO of Absolutely Independent, Patty Geneste, said that Insight Productions infringed on the copyright of The Singing Office with their television series Canada Sings. Geneste said that Canada Sings has the same format with slight differences. President and CEO of Insight Productions, John Brunton, said that their show's format was inspired by Glee.

== Reception ==
Anne Louise Bannon of Common Sense Media said of the American version, "the show actually seems more positive than some of its fellow talent-competition brethren, and it's oddly charming in its own way." David Hinckley of New York Daily News said that the American show "falls flat" and that it is "plodding toward an amateur night competition".
