= Ask a Silly Answer =

1977 British TV game show

- Presented by: Terry Wogan
- Country of origin: United Kingdom
- Original language: English

Production
- Running time: 30mins (inc. adverts)
- Production company: Southern Television

Original release
- Network: ITV
- Release: 14 April – 19 May 1977

Ask a Silly Answer is a panel show that aired on British television in 1977. Produced by Southern Television and hosted by Terry Wogan, there was only one series, of six episodes.

The panel comprised two teams;

- Alfred Marks and Willie Rushton
- Graeme Garden and Spike Milligan.

== Transmissions ==
Series	Start date	End date	Episodes
1	14 April	19 May 1977	6

The series was also broadcast by Anglia television during the summer of 1977.
