= Dale Replay =

- Starring: Carlos Calderón; Francisca Lachapel; Alessandra Villegas
- Original language: Spanish
- No. of episodes: 5

Production
- Running time: 60 min. (including commercials)

Original release
- Network: Univision
- Release: February 17 – March 17, 2017

Dale Replay is a Spanish-language game show that premiered in the United States on February 17, 2017, on Univision. The show is hosted by Carlos Calderón with Francisca Lachapel and Alessandra Villegas as celebrity captains. It was based on the Netherlands game show Beste Kijkers (Dear Viewers) which was later called Telly Test in Belgium. The show was canceled after five episodes due to low ratings.

== Episodes ==
| No. | Title | Original release date | US viewers (millions) |
|---|---|---|---|
| 1 | "El Dasa and Geraldine Galván" | February 17, 2017 | 1.40 |
| 2 | "Arap Bethke and Chino" | February 24, 2017 | 1.35 |
| 3 | "Borja Voces and Pedro Moreno" | March 3, 2017 | 1.20 |
| 4 | "Edición Gigante #1" | March 10, 2017 | 1.28 |
| 5 | "Edición Gigante #2" | March 17, 2017 | 1.18 |
