= The Hollywood Game =

- Genre: Game show
- Directed by: Marty Pasetta (pilot); Greg Pasetta (series)
- Presented by: Peter Allen (pilot); Bob Goen
- Narrated by: John Cramer
- Country of origin: United States
- No. of episodes: 6 (4 aired)

Production
- Executive producer: Marty Pasetta
- Producer: Stephen Radosh
- Running time: approx. 22-26 minutes
- Production companies: Pasetta Productions; Rastar; CBS Entertainment Productions

Original release
- Network: CBS
- Release: June 19 – July 10, 1992

The Hollywood Game is a prime time game show hosted by Bob Goen that ran for four weeks on CBS during the summer of 1992. It involved two teams of two contestants each, who answered trivia questions about film and television. The show was taped at CBS Television City's Studio 33 and was the first game show John Cramer announced. The Hollywood Game was the last regularly scheduled game show to air in primetime until the 1996 series Big Deal.

== Gameplay ==
=== Round 1 ===
After choosing a category, each team was asked two questions worth $100 and $200, respectively. Each question was preceded by a TV/film clip or a picture. If a team failed to answer correctly, the opposing team had the chance to "steal" the question and the money.

On the pilot episode, each team's category was determined by stopping a randomizer.

=== Rounds 2 & 3 ===
Both teams competed to answer three questions in a chosen category. Questions were worth $200, $400, and $800 respectively. Round 3 was identical, except that the question values increased to $500, $1,000, and $2,000.

=== The Double Feature Round ===
Similar to the final round on Jeopardy!, each team could wager all, half, or none of their accumulated bankroll on a question in a predetermined category. Afterwards, the teams were shown 2 film clips from the same category, then were asked a question related to both clips. The teams then had 20 seconds to write down their answers. The team with the highest score at the end of the round won the game and proceeded to the bonus round. Both teams kept their money.

== The Fast Film Round ==
Each player was given 15 seconds (30 seconds total) to identify nine pictures in a particular category (such as "Men in Uniform" or "Barbra Streisand Films"). Once a player got a picture right or passed on it, they moved on to the next one. The other player began with the pictures the first player didn't get to, followed by the ones the first player missed. Each correct answer lit up a letter in "H-O-L-L-Y-W-O-O-D" and earned the team $1,000 (passing on a picture turned a letter blue); nine correct answers (lighting the entire word) won $25,000. The maximum possible win on the show (including "stolen" money) was $45,600.
