= Marie-Ange Nardi =

French television presenter for TF1 (born 1961)

- Born: 2 April 1961 (age 65); Marseille, France
- Occupation: TV host Téléshopping
- Employer: TF1

Marie-Ange Nardi (born 2 April 1961 in Marseille) is a French television presenter for TF1. She began in television as a continuity announcer for France 3 Marseille while studying psychology in university, later becoming a national announcer with Antenne 2.

She has chiefly worked as a game show host, on Trivial Pursuit, Jeux Sans Frontières, Grain de Folie, Pyramide, Qui est qui ?, Tout vu Tout lu, and, beginning in 2006, La Cible.

While doing a news segment for the France 3 television programme 40° à l'Ombre [40° in the Shade] on 8 August 1997, she was attacked by a lion. She did not sustain serious injuries.
