= One of a Kind (game show) =

Canadian television panel game show

- Genre: Panel game
- Created by: Bernard Slade
- Written by: Bernard Slade
- Presented by: Alex Barris
- Starring: Rita Greer Allen; Lloyd Bochner; Allan Manings; Kathie McNeil
- Country of origin: Canada
- Original language: English
- No. of seasons: 2

Production
- Producers: Harvey Hart; Bob Jarvis (1958–1959); Claude Baikie (1959)
- Running time: 30 minutes

Original release
- Network: CBC Television
- Release: 6 June 1958 – 24 June 1959

One of a Kind is a Canadian television panel game show that aired on CBC Television from 1958 to 1959.

== Premise ==
The series featured a panel (Rita Greer Allen, Lloyd Bochner, Allan Manings and Kathie McNeil) who attempted to identity of an item using guesswork. Once the item was identified or revealed, the panel and moderator (Alex Barris) would discuss the item with an associated guest. The panel game was similar to Front Page Challenge except that this involved objects instead of news stories. Visiting personalities included Xavier Cugat, Celia Franca, Arthur Godfrey, Cedric Hardwicke, Celeste Holm, Mitch Miller, Jan Peerce, Kate Reid and Walter Susskind.

== Scheduling ==
This half-hour series was broadcast Fridays at 8:30 p.m. (Eastern) from 6 June to 12 September 1958, then given a full season on Wednesdays at 8:30 p.m. from 1 October 1958 to 24 June 1959.
