= La Poule aux œufs d'or =

French-Canadian game show

La Poule aux œufs d'or ("The Hen with the Golden Eggs") is the title of two different Canadian television game shows broadcast during two different periods.

== History and format of first version ==
The first was broadcast by the Canadian Broadcasting Corporation's (CBC) French-language television network, Radio-Canada, from 1958 until 1966 and hosted by Roger Baulu (replaced by Doris Lussier for the final season), accompanied, at first, by René Caron, and then by Henri Bergeron and by two hostesses.

Two contestants had to respond to five questions, each one being worth a certain amount of money. The winner then had to choose at random an envelope containing a prize that was worth less than, equal to, or greater than the winnings already accumulated. With these total winnings, the contestant can buy an egg, chosen at random, containing a prize. There are two possible outcomes: either they lose everything (or merely win a trifling sum), or they win a prize of high value.

== Broadcast information of second version ==
The second version has been broadcast on the TVA Network, Wednesdays at 7:30 p.m. (7:00 p.m. until January 2006 and since August 2018) from September 8, 1993. It is a Loto-Québec game, and has been hosted by Guy Mongrain since inception, with Yves Corbeil (before July 2006) and Gino Chouinard (since August 2006) substituting for Mongrain during his absences, and assisted by Claudia Ébacher and Anouk Meunier (Julie Naud and Lyne Laramée before July 2007).

After Mongrain retired in June 2018, Julie Houle and Sébastien Benoît became the two hosts, with Richard Turcotte being the announcer. Mongrain's last show was a special show marking the show's 25th anniversary, which featured a fourth game (as opposed to the usual three) alongside clips from the archives and special interviews.

The show offers a progressive jackpot as its grand prize (shown on set as le gros lot). It starts at $150,000, in Canadian dollars, and increases by $25,000 for each week not won.

Three games are played every episode, with two players per game (six players per show). The contestants all won their way onto the show by scratching off three 'TELE' symbols in its namesake scratch lottery game.

== Format of second version ==
=== The Wheel Game ===
Before each game, the two contestants spin six wheels (three for each contestant) with numbers from 0 through 9 to determine the winning number for the lottery game. If either of the contestants spin duplicates of a certain number, they originally spun a bonus wheel, which gave them the chance to win a prize, such as a gift certificate, a vacation, or a new car valued at $25,000.

The second variation of this game had the contestant pick golden eggs off a screen until they made a match; the prize matched was the prize won. If the contestant spun three of the same number, they were allowed to pick golden eggs until two matches were made, and they won the prize of the higher value. Also, the car's value is now generally around $40,000.

The third bonus format, introduced in 2017, has the contestant who spun duplicate numbers play one of three bonus games selected at random:

Lucky Egg (Le chance-œufs): The contestant is shown a screen with 14 eggs. The object of the game is to uncover two identical symbols. A player who uncovers two identical symbols wins the matching cash prize. In the case of a tripled number, the player still continues to uncover symbols until one pairs of identical symbols are revealed. The player takes home the prize the value they revealed. This game have resemblance to the previous format except when they uncovered a match they get that value and didn’t have the second pick. Cash prizes range from $2,500 to $25,000 or $5,000 to $50,000 if tripled number were spun.
Gener-Eggs (Le gener-œufs): This is played using an electronic wheel divided into 12 segments offering one cash prize each. The player activates the wheel and wins the cash prize indicated in the segment where the wheel stops. The highest value is $13,000.
The Chicken and Ladder Game (La poule et l’échelle): This is played with a touch screen displaying a pair of dice. Each die conceals a number from 1 to 6. The player virtually "scrambles" (rolls) the dice to determine the number of rungs the chicken will climb and reveal the prize the player takes home.
The Key and Egg game (Le luxu-oeufs): There were four keys and four egg locks, each of them unlock 1 egg lock. The player chooses 1 key and test them virtually with the four egg locks if the key unlock which egg lock they get the prize under that egglock that they unlocked. Cash prize for unlocked the egg lock were $2,000, $4,000, $7,000 and $13,000.
The Machine and Chicken game (la machine à poule): The player picks one of the four spots to dropped the egg on a virtual Plinko machine the zone that the egg dropped give that player the cash prize. Cash prize on this game are $2,000, $4,000, $8,000 and $12,000.

==== Bonus Drawing ====
The home viewers who play the appropriate lottery tickets win money determined by how many numbers they match on the wheels; if they match all six, they win the full jackpot offered for each game: $25,000 for Game 1, $50,000 for Game 2, and $100,000 for Game 3. They can also pick a bonus number, which earns a bonus jackpot if it matches the number of the egg that was hiding the jackpot.

=== Egg Face-Off ===
Once the wheels are spun, the contestants then face boards with numbers from 0 through 9. Behind each number is a hidden dollar amount from $1,000 to $3,500, or a golden egg. The contestants alternate picking numbers, and their first selections are always the numbers they spun on the wheels. In the event that a contestant spins duplicate numbers, the dollar amount behind their first selection is doubled (or tripled if they spin three of the same number). The first contestant to find three eggs advances to the bonus game.

Should both contestants find 3 eggs in the same number of turns, the amounts are re-shuffled and another game is played. Losing contestants keep their winnings plus an additional $1,000 for each of the eggs they found (if any).

==== Tiebreaker Variation ====
Later in the show's run, the rule was changed to introduce a new tiebreaker if both contestants find 3 eggs in the same number of turns. Each one picks an egg with a number from 0 to 9, and the contestant with highest number plays the bonus game. Both players are present at the bonus game, however, but only the winning contestant can select an egg. If both contestants pick the same number, they keep selecting until there is a winner.

=== Bonus Game ===
In the bonus game, the contestant chooses one of 24 golden eggs. Twenty-three of the eggs have cash amounts ranging from $12,000 to $100,000, while the other one contains the jackpot ("Le Gros Lot"). If the sound of a rooster crowing is heard after they select an egg, the contestant gets a bonus selection.

After the egg is selected, the contestant chooses an envelope from a giant spinner. The contents of the envelope are revealed immediately, and the contestant is offered a choice: they can either take the revealed amount, or go for what is inside their egg. In the event that the contestant gets a bonus selection, and elects to go for the egg, the contents of the first egg are revealed first, and the same offer is made. If the contestant elects to go for the egg again, they automatically win what is inside the second egg.

In the event both players found 3 eggs in the same number of turns, the winner plays the bonus game as normal, but the losing contestant is awarded the amount the winning contestant did not accept. If the rooster crowed, and the winning contestant accepted the money in the first egg, the losing contestant has to decide whether to select the amount revealed in the envelope or go for the second egg, making it possible for him/her to win the jackpot.

One egg's envelope has a card that is labeled "œuf à double jaune" (double yolk). Selecting the egg with this envelope earns the contestant $10,000 or $25,000 in addition to the original amount on the envelope they rejected.

One envelope from the giant spinner has an envelope labeled "Coq d'or" (golden rooster), selecting this envelope doubles all amounts available inside each egg, meaning it's possible to win a double jackpot. The contestant who picks it then is allowed another envelope selection, and decides as usual whether to take the envelope or go for double the money inside the egg.

Because the bonus game for spinning duplicate numbers is played solely for money now, it is only possible for a contestant to win a new car by choosing the envelope from the giant spinner labeled "Voiture" (automobile), and then deciding to take it instead going for what's inside the egg.

== Biggest winners and landmark episodes ==
The show's biggest winner was awarded $1,527,000 on February 25, 2024. On March 2, 2016, the show celebrated its 1000th episode.

On February 15, 2017, the show's second biggest jackpot of $925,000 was won after 31 shows (although two shows earlier, one contestant within that period had the jackpot egg but instead chose the envelope). The contestant's total was $936,000.

The third biggest jackpot winner's grand total was $909,500 (including a $900,000 jackpot).
