= All-Star Cup =

- Created by: Ant & Dec
- Presented by: Jamie Theakston; Kirsty Gallacher; Ant & Dec
- Country of origin: United Kingdom

Original release
- Network: Sky One (2005); ITV (2006)
- Release: 2005 – 2006

The All-Star Cup (stylised as "All*Star Cup") is a celebrity golf match first held at the Celtic Manor Resort in Newport, Wales in 2005 that pitted two teams of celebrities against each other in a Ryder Cup-style competition.

The first series was aired on Sky One, with the second series being covered on ITV with extra coverage on ITV2.

== Series 1 ==
In the 2005 competition the American team were captained by Mark O'Meara and the Europeans were captained by Colin Montgomerie. The event was aired on Sky One, presented by Kirsty Gallacher and Jamie Theakston and created by Anthony McPartlin and Declan Donnelly.

The tournament ended dramatically, with the result only decided on the 18th hole of the final match, when Ronan Keating and Damian Lewis won the hole against Michael Douglas and Mark Spitz to win the cup for Europe by a score of 91–89.

Team USA 2005	Team Europe 2005
Michael Chang	Matt Dawson
Michael Douglas	Chris Evans
Patrick Duffy	Ruud Gullit *
Boomer Esiason	Gavin Henson
Kenny G	Ronan Keating
Steve Hytner	Jodie Kidd
Cheryl Ladd	Damian Lewis
George Lopez	James Nesbitt
Rob Lowe	Sir Steve Redgrave
Cheech Marin	Peter Schmeichel
Haley Joel Osment	Ian Wright
Nick Swisher	Catherine Zeta-Jones

- Replaced Boris Becker *

== Series 2 ==
The 2006 tournament took place from 26 to 28 August and was broadcast across ITV and ITV2 during the August Bank Holiday weekend, with Ant & Dec taking up the role of hosting the live coverage on ITV, and Kirsty Gallacher and Ben Shephard fronting the ITV2 coverage. Colin Montgomerie returned to captain the European team, with the American team now being captained by Todd Hamilton.

Europe won the cup for the second time. Entertainer Bruce Forsyth holed the winning putt, aged 78. He had been dubbed 'The Golfather' by his teammates during the contest.

Team USA 2006	Team Europe 2006
William Baldwin	Chris Evans
Michael Brandon	Bruce Forsyth
Richard Burgi	Ruud Gullit
Alice Cooper	Ronan Keating
Patrick Duffy	Ross Kemp
Michael Johnson	Jodie Kidd
James Keach ^{†}	Damian Lewis
Meat Loaf	James Nesbitt
Aidan Quinn	Phil Tufnell
Richard Schiff	Bradley Walsh
Jane Seymour^{††}	Ian Wright

^{†} James Keach replaced Chazz Palminteri during the second day due to injury.
^{††} Jane Seymour is British, but she represented the United States where she is a naturalized citizen.

== Cancellation ==
The All-Star Cup did not have a third series as ITV would not put up the money for 2007.
