= La Cible =

French television game show

- Created by: Robert Caplain; Thomas Colamaria
- Country of origin: United States
- Original language: French
- No. of seasons: 4
- No. of episodes: 1015

Original release
- Network: France 2
- Release: January 6, 2003 – March 30, 2007

La Cible (The Target) was a game show aired on France 2. Its host from 2003 to 2006 was Olivier Minne; he was succeeded by Marie-Ange Nardi. The series continued until 2007. In Canada, it is broadcast on TV5. In Canada, the TVA network broadcast a similar programme called Le Cercle.

It was an adaptation of the American format Face Off.

== The game ==
Twelve contestants (usually six men and six women) play each day for a place in the final round by answering questions about general culture. In the final round the one surviving contestant tries to provide correct answers to 21 questions in six categories. The prize (called le cœur de la cible or "bullseye") is a minimum of €2000, supplemented by €500 each time a finalist fails to win it.

Frequent special programs feature two-person teams of contestants (for example, husband-and-wife teams).

=== First and second rounds (Les premier et second tours) ===
The first and second rounds eliminate six contestants. Arranged in a circle around a camera which swivels through 360°, six contestants (men in the first round, women in the second) must reply to questions which have several answers – that is, they must name members of a category (for example, "Name a film featuring Jean Gabin").

The camera turns to a randomly selected contestant, who must reply within about five seconds. If the contestant replies correctly, he or she remains in the game and another contestant is tested; a contestant is eliminated if he or she gives an incorrect answer, does not reply, or repeats an answer previously given. Once three contestants are eliminated the round is over.

=== Definitions ===
Two contestants are eliminated in the next round, in which each contestant is presented with six definitions and must try to supply the terms defined within 30 seconds. Each answer in each contestant's set begins with the same letter. Contestants may skip a definition; if time remains it will be repeated later. The two contestants with the fewest correct responses are eliminated; ties are broken in favour of the contestant who gave his or her last correct answer the earliest.

=== The Next Step (La Suite) ===
This phase is similar to the first and second rounds, but conducted with only the remaining four contestants. Contestants are again asked to name items connected a category, and each contestant must answer within about 5 seconds. Once three contestants have given incorrect answers, the surviving contestant is credited with a point. A contestant is not allowed to win by default and must give one correct answer to score a point.

The first two contestants to score two points then proceed to the next stage.

=== The Auction (Les Enchères) ===
The two remaining candidates then bid for the right to supply answers to a question. The contestant promising to supply the most correct answers is then asked the question. This procedure is somewhat similar to the Bid a Note segment of the American game show Name That Tune. All the answers given must be correct. Each answer must be given within 5 seconds, or the contestant fails. If the contestant provides the bid number of correct answers (contestants are not allowed to provide more answers than the number they bid), he or she receives a point. If the contestant fails, his or her opponent receives a point. The first to collect two points proceeds to the final round.

=== La Finale ===
A contestant is given 120 seconds, and all six levels have to be completed with no pause. The first level requires one correct answer, the second two, and so on, so that 21 correct answers must be supplied altogether. At this stage the contestant may supply more answers than the number called for and be credited with the correct answers among them. If a contestant runs out of time, he or she will be credited in order with €100 per correct category until an incorrectly answered one is encountered. If the contestant provides all 21 required correct answers, he or she wins le cœur de la cible.

Originally, the surviving contestant had 100 seconds in which to answer questions at six levels. In 2005, the round was changed again. After three levels have been completed, the contestant's success was evaluated. If the contestant has failed to complete any category correctly, he or she has lost. If the contestant has completed each category correctly, he or she chooses between taking a prize of €500 or continuing in an attempt to win the grand prize. When the new host Marie-Ange entered, the time given was temporarily raised to 124 seconds. It was then changed to the most recent format.

== International versions ==
In Quebec, Canada, the TVA network broadcast Le Cercle (The Circle), a half-hour version of La Cible, from 2005 to 2011. It was hosted by Charles Lafortune. In 2013, E! premiered an English-language version known as Pop Quiz. Themed around entertainment and popular culture, staff from the TVA version are involved in its production.

On Vietnam, the VTV3 network broadcast Đối mặt, a one-hour version of La Cible, from 2007 to 2010.

Country	Local name	Presenter(s)	Channel	Date of transmission
Canada (French)	Le Cercle	Charles Lafortune	TVA	September 19, 2005 – December 16, 2011
Canada (English)	Pop Quiz	Devon Soltendieck and Emma Hunter	E!	November 4, 2013 – February 7, 2014
Germany	Die Spielarena	Sascha Kalupke	Kabel eins	July 17, 2006 – August 4, 2006
Serbia	Pravo Lice	Sanja Radan	TV Pink	September 30, 2004 – July 17, 2005
Vietnam	Đối Mặt	Trung Kiên; Trần Quang Minh	VTV3	October 28, 2007 – November 7, 2010
