= Dealer's Choice (game show) =

- Created by: Ed Fishman; Randall Freer
- Presented by: Bob Hastings; Jack Clark with Jane Nelson
- Announcer: Jim Thompson
- Music by: John LaSalle
- Country of origin: United States
- No. of episodes: 210

Production
- Running time: 24 mins.
- Production companies: Odyssey Productions (1974) (season 1); Fishman-Freer Productions (1974-1975) (season 2)

Original release
- Network: Syndicated (daily)
- Release: January 21, 1974 – December 12, 1975

Dealer's Choice is an American game show that aired from January 21, 1974, to December 12, 1975, in syndication for a total of 210 episodes, built around various casino-type games. Bob Hastings was the host for the first few weeks; afterwards, Jack Clark, who was better known at the time as an announcer for other game shows, took over as the host. Hastings and Clark, who wore tuxedoes as hosts of Dealer's Choice, were assisted by hostess Jane Nelson and by announcer Jim Thompson. The show was taped at the Tropicana Hotel in Las Vegas, but later moved to Los Angeles after its first season.

Local stations normally aired the program in daytime slots which the networks did not feed; relatively few aired the show during the coveted Prime Time Access early evening slots before network prime time programming. As such, Dealer's Choice was not among the most popular off-network games of its time due to comparatively low audiences, but managed to survive over parts of three seasons nonetheless. The very next Monday after the show was removed from circulation, Clark moved over to a new game, The Cross-Wits, also a syndicated entry (but from a different packager).

== Dealer's Choice game-play ==
=== The main competition ===
Three contestants, chosen from the studio audience, competed in games of chance, all related to gambling. Three audience members' names were each hidden behind one of nine slot machine symbols on a gameboard. An audience member was selected and chose four symbols from the board. For each symbol that hid a contestant's name, the audience member received $25. If the audience member uncovered all three contestants' names, then the audience member won a bonus prize.

After being seated behind one of three podiums onstage, each contestant was given 100 chips to wager in various casino-type games. Multiple games used playing cards, including "Blackjack," "Any Pair Loses," "In-Between," etc. Other games included using a "Wheel of Chance" or a hopper filled with colored ping-pong balls. In some games contestants made a single bet which was then paid out at specific odds or subtracted from the contestant's chips depending upon the outcome of the game. Other games featured a compounded betting format in which the contestants made an initial bet, and the payout was doubled or tripled multiple times as the game progressed.

The first three games featured limits for the number of chips allowed to be wagered. The first game, which had multiple rounds where the player's winnings doubled after each round, required a 5-chip or 10-chip bet; the host would explain that other bets could not be handled by their podium system. The second had a 25-chip maximum. Blackjack was always featured as the third game and had a 50-chip maximum. The third game also featured an audience member acting as the "house." The audience member won $25 for each player that lost or tied, and an extra $50 if the house's hand beat or tied all three contestants' hands. The fourth game featured no limit on betting, and each contestant's wager was made in secret at the start of the game.

After the fourth game, contestants chose one of three prizes from three different categories (1−100 chips, 101−300 chips, and 301-500 chips) based upon the final number of chips they held. If two or more contestants finished in the same level, the contestant finishing with the higher total received first choice of the prizes. Additionally, the person with the highest chip total overall played a bonus game for an additional prize.

=== The Bonus Dice ===
The winning player rolled special "Bonus Dice," whose faces represented sums of money from $50–$200. But one face on one Bonus Die had a spade on it, and if the contestant rolled the spade all bonus round winnings were lost and the game was over. The contestant continued to roll until he or she rolled the spade, quit with the money he or she had already won, or reached $1,000. In the last of those three possible cases, the contestants also won bonus prizes, usually a trip. Later in the show's run, if the contestant had earned at least 500 chips in the main game, the bonus round prize was a car.

== Episode status ==
One episode of Dealer's Choice with Bob Hastings and two with Jack Clark are known to exist.

The series' existence has not been confirmed. The possibility remains that most episodes were lost because of the wiping of videotapes. This remained a common practice as late as 1976, long after the invention of the videocassette.

== Home game ==
A home edition of the game was produced by Gamut Of Games under the name Place Your Bets! Jack Clark and Jane Nelson were pictured on the cover, and it featured many of the same games from the series. The name Place Your Bets! was used instead of Dealer's Choice because Parker Brothers manufactured an unrelated board game on the market under the Dealer's Choice name, which was first launched in 1972.
