= Ross Mullan =

Canadian-British actor and puppeteer (born 1967)

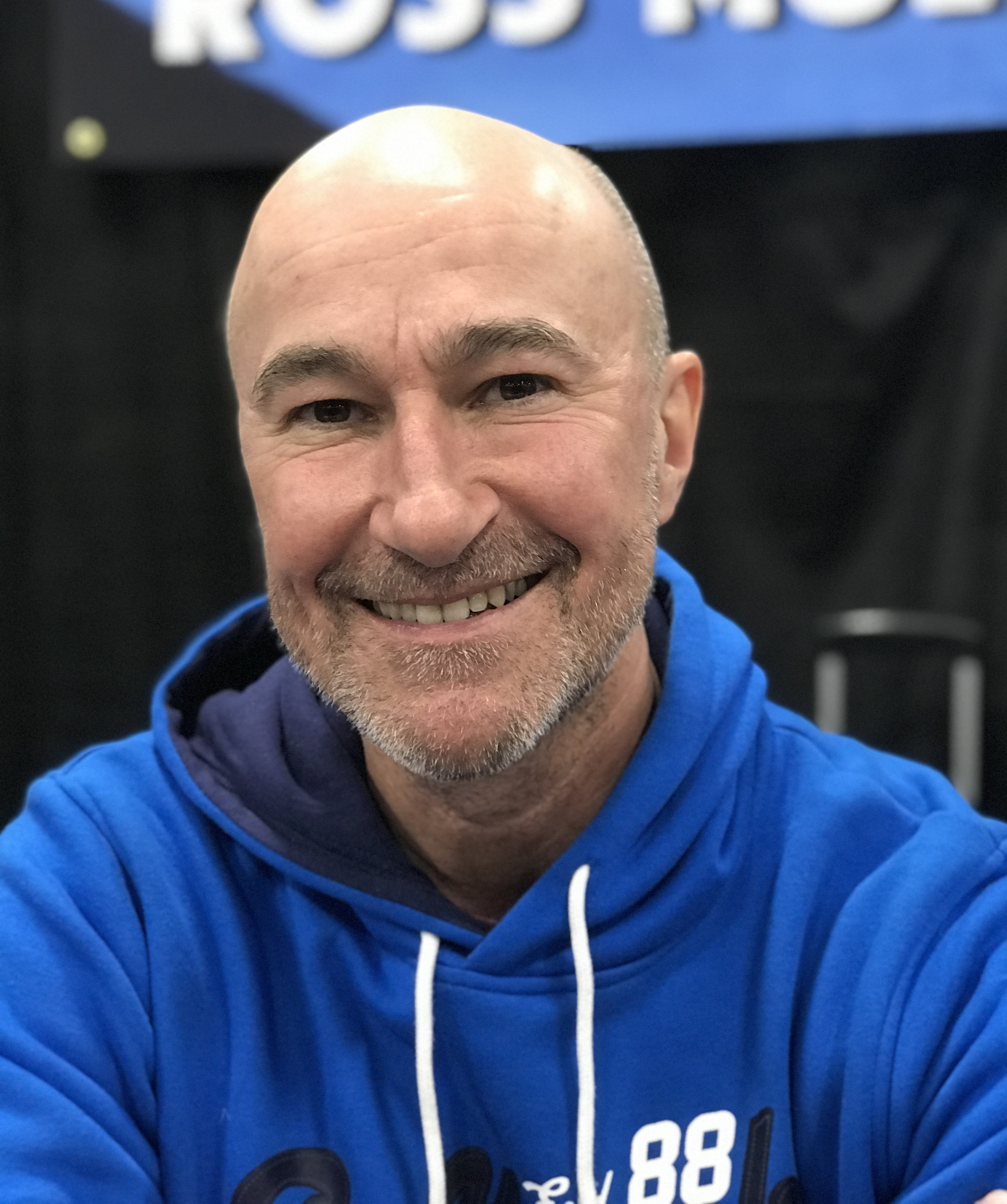
- Mullan at the 2019 East Coast Comicon
- Born: 5 January 1967 (age 59); Montreal, Quebec, Canada
- Occupations: Actor, puppeteer
- Years active: 2002–present

Ross Mullan (born 5 January 1967) is a Canadian-British actor and puppeteer. He is known for portraying White Walkers on the HBO television series Game of Thrones in its second to fourth seasons. He has appeared in episodes of Doctor Who and in the 2010 film Clash of the Titans.

== Early life ==
Mullan grew up in Montreal and attended Children's Theatre in the West End of Montreal. Later he did the theatre program at John Abbott College and then Ryerson University for their Theatre program.

== Career ==
After completing university, he moved to Ottawa and worked at the Oddyssey Theatre developing skills in mask and puppet movement theatre.

Mullan moved to the UK on a whim after going there on vacation. He immediately started touring with theatre companies all over Europe, the Middle East, and Asia doing musical productions of David Copperfield, Gulliver's Travels, and Sherlock Holmes. He later transitioned to television doing puppet for a show called Dinotopia, the effects department wanted someone to animate this dinosaur and make it emote like a person.

Ross also played Orsino in l, Bath Theatre Royal's production of Twelfth Night, the title role of the Selfish Giant for Leicester Haymarket Theatre and brought the critically acclaimed play Thick from the Edinburgh festival to New York City with sold-out performances.

Ross played the role of the 'Numbertaker' in the children's show, Numberjacks. The Numbertaker is a live-action character, with an exaggerated top hat and a white robe, who removes numbers, or numbers of things.

He also played Nev the Bear as a co-starring actor in Smile in 2002 and again in 2007, alongside Barney Harwood, on another show called, Bear Behaving Badly.

He played Pemphredo, one of the three blind Stygian witches, in Clash of the Titans (2010); one of the werewolves in Howl; and The Silence and The Teller on Doctor Who.

In 2012, he played a White Walker in "Valar Morghulis", an episode of the HBO television series Game of Thrones, and reprised the role in the May 2013 episode "Second Sons". He played a different White Walker in the April 2014 episode "Oathkeeper".

Mullan also provided the voice of the Narrator in the 2003 video game Ghost Master.

As of 2018, he was teaching animation at University for the Creative Arts, in Farnham.
