= Prank Patrol (British TV series) =

British children's television series (2007–2010)

- Created by: David Hansen (revealed in a comment from a Kurtis Conner video)
- Based on: Prank Patrol (Canadian TV series) by David Hansen (revealed in a comment from a Kurtis Conner video)
- Starring: Barney Harwood
- Country of origin: United Kingdom
- No. of series: 3
- No. of episodes: 40

Production
- Executive producer: Joshua Austin
- Running time: 25 minutes
- Production company: Apartment 11 Productions

Original release
- Network: CBBC
- Release: 16 September 2006 – 20 March 2010

Related
- Rank the Prank

Prank Patrol is a British version of the Canadian show of the same name. The show was made by Baker Media for CBBC which specialised in kids programming. It was hosted by Barney Harwood. It was produced by Baker Media in association with Apartment 11 Productions. The series originally aired as part of TMI in 2006 and then aired standalone the following year.

== Format ==
Based on the original Prank Patrol series, a child nominates his or her friend to play a prank on. Barney Harwood then arrives in his van with the Ninjas driving and organizes their Prank at Prank HQ. They usually are assisted by someone in that prank's area of expertise. After preparing everything it is then 'Prank Day' which is the day the prank will be executed.

== Fillers ==
=== Recipe for a Prank ===
Similar to the original Canadian format, this filler is an animated short of which explains how to set up one's own Prank.

=== Release the Ninjas ===
The Ninjas usually go to a public place and play a prank, whether it be hiding behind a park bench and making fart sounds or putting free drinks on a table with leaking cups. Stockport Town Centre in Greater Manchester was usually the location of these pranks.

== Production ==
In late 2012, The Daily Telegraph reported on the cancellation of the show and the end of its repeats after an incident in Australia in which radio presenters fooled a hospital employee into believing they were members of the UK Royal Family to learn more about a member of said family at the hospital, leading to the hospital employee taking her own life. Prank Patrol's production, in fact, ended two years before the incident, and the show's final repeats were in June 2013. See Suicide of Jacintha Saldanha for more information.

== Episodes ==
| Series | Episodes | Originally released | |
| Series | Episodes | First released | Last released |
|---|---|---|---|
| 1 | 20 | 16 April 2007 | 27 August 2007 |
| 2 | 10 | 16 October 2007 | 18 December 2007 |
| 3 | 10 | 16 January 2010 | 20 March 2010 |

=== Series 1: 2007 ===
| No. in series | Title | Prankster | Target(s) | Original release date |
|---|---|---|---|---|
| 1 | "Art Auction" | Josh Caulton | George & Bill Caulton | 16 April 2007 |
Josh tricks his brothers that his work of art will sell for thousands at auction.
| 2 | "The Mummy" | Freddie Watkins | Freddie's target: Billy | 23 April 2007 |
Freddie wants to unleash an ancient Egyptian spell on his best friend.
| 3 | "Haunted Hall" | Helena Smith | Emily, Jenny & Melissa | 30 April 2007 |
Helena wants to prank her friends with a guided tour to a supposedly haunted hall.
| 4 | "Computer Game Comes Alive" | Joe Barrett | James Barrett | 7 May 2007 |
Barney is turned into a computer game character to prank Joe's younger brother.
| 5 | "Giant Spider" | Erik Fish | Tom Cunningham | 14 May 2007 |
Erik's friend thinks he is not afraid of anything. Erik tests him with a giant spider.
| 6 | "Karate Kid" | Jake Woods | Karate class | 21 May 2007 |
Jake wants to prank his martial arts classmates to show them he can be a karate superstar.
| 7 | "Cheeky Chinese" | Krissy Gill | Surj Gill (Krissy's father) | 28 May 2007 |
Krissy makes a meal that her dad will remember for the rest of his life.
| 8 | "Mere Monster" | Alice Owen | Keira | 4 June 2007 |
Alice is into canoeing and wants to pay back her best mate, who is always screaming.
| 9 | "Rap Star" | Shallon Yusuf | Mallisha, Khaleal & Lekishea | 11 June 2007 |
Shallon becomes a rapper to prank his three cousins who embarrass him at school.
| 10 | "Aliens Exist" | Harry Young | Jordan & Katie | 18 June 2007 |
Harry wants to convince his friends that aliens have landed in his back garden.
| 11 | "Dinosaur Dig" | Arian | Max, Lloyd & Alex Thompson | 25 June 2007 |
The prankster wants to make his friends believe dinosaurs still exist.
| 12 | "Space Station" | Ella Brown | Louise | 2 July 2007 |
Ella convinces her best friend Louise that she can communicate with aliens.
| 13 | "Bad News Bakery" | Oliver Benbow White | Holly | 9 July 2007 |
Oliver creates a recipe for disaster for his best buddy Holly and a bride and groom.
| 14 | "Monkey Mayhem" | Olivia Fearnhead | Sophie | 16 July 2007 |
Olivia pulls a banana prank on her best friend Sophie at a local safari park.
| 15 | "Magic Show" | Jazmin Browning | Chloe | 23 July 2007 |
Prankster Jazmin plans a magic moment when she casts a spell over her friend Chloe.
| 16 | "Dream Machine" | Olivia Speakman | Hannah | 30 July 2007 |
Olivia invites Hannah to a dream laboratory for a prank that turns into a nightmare.
| 17 | "Lousy Launderette" | Liz Hartley | Sophie | 6 August 2007 |
Liz pranks her best mate Sophie at a lousy launderette.
| 18 | "Bonkers Bowling" | Hannah Clifford | Georgia Cowell | 13 August 2007 |
A girl called Hannah wants to turn her bowling friend into a bowling wreck.
| 19 | "Calamity Car Wash" | Lewis Slater | Robert Slater | 20 August 2007 |
Disaster occurs when Lewis invites his twin brother Robert to help out at a car wash.
| 20 | "The Best Of..." | James Barrett (Payback Prank) | Joe Barrett | 27 August 2007 |
Barney chooses his top five pranks from the series.: 5. Magic Show (Jazmin & Chloe); 4. Mere Monsters (Alice & Keira); 3. Bad News Bakery (Oliver & Holly); 2. Space Station (Ella & Louise); 1. Computer Game Comes Alive (Joe & James)

=== Series 2: 2007 ===
| No. in series | Title | Prankster | Target(s) | Original release date |
|---|---|---|---|---|
| 1 | "Calamity Cop Shop" | Joe Egan | Aaron | 16 October 2007 |
Joe joins the Prank Patrol to frame his best friend for a crime he did not commit.
| 2 | "Invisible" | Susannah Owen | Thomas | 23 October 2007 |
Susannah tells her friend that he can become involved in developing a new computer game.
| 3 | "Talent Showdown" | Sam Liu | Leigh | 30 October 2007 |
Sam Liu joins the Prank Patrol to set up his best friend Leigh with a fake talent show.
| 4 | "Meteor Madness" | James Fardy | Henry | 6 November 2007 |
James has to convince his best friend that his house is contaminated by a meteor.
| 5 | "Forest of Fear" | David Cowan | Max | 13 November 2007 |
David tries to trick his friend Max into believing that a beast is roaming the woods.
| 6 | "Fortune Teller" | Maisie McGarvey | Jak | 20 November 2007 |
Barney Harwood dresses as a Turkish sage and climbs inside a retro fortune teller machine.
| 7 | "Spy Dad" | Macaully Collier | Ryan | 27 November 2007 |
Barney and the team convince the target that their dad is actually a secret agent.
| 8 | "Ice Scream!" | Rita Sorel | Morgan | 4 December 2007 |
Rita tells her friends that they have been invited to visit an ice cream van.
| 9 | "Sounds Stupid" | Ellie Cheveau | Beth | 11 December 2007 |
A recording studio is used to hoodwink a victim into destroying a master CD.
| 10 | "Croc Shock" | Taylor-Marie Webb | Gemma & Katie | 18 December 2007 |
The prank targets believe they are helping a zoo vet during an operation on a crocodile.

=== Series 3: 2010 ===
| No. in series | Title | Prankster | Target(s) | Original release date |
|---|---|---|---|---|
| 1 | "Shark Shenanigans" | Olivia Buckley | Conor | 16 January 2010 |
The prankster plans to bring her best friend face to face with a scary great white shark.
| 2 | "Whacky Wedding" | Bupe Chander | Olivia | 23 January 2010 |
The target turns up in a bridesmaid's outfit at a stranger's wedding.
| 3 | "Football Crazy" | Taylor Smith | Rhys | 30 January 2010 |
Barney Harwood and the Ninjas tackle the target on the pitch.
| 4 | "Space Spoof" | Joe Alty | Charlie | 6 February 2010 |
Barney Harwood helps Joe to prank his best mate with an out-of-this-world experience.
| 5 | "Rodent Revenge" | Emma Woodruff | Olivia | 13 February 2010 |
Barney and the Ninjas cause a rat-astrophe.
| 6 | "Ghostly Gallery" | Emerson Maude | Jodie | 20 February 2010 |
A day out at the museum turns out to be far from normal, more paranormal for one target.
| 7 | "Fishy Business" | Josh Nimmo | Ben | 27 February 2010 |
A prankster tries to convince his target that there is a scary lake lizard on the loose.
| 8 | "Delivery Disaster" | Louis Beech | Callum | 6 March 2010 |
There could be an explosive situation in the warehouse full of dozy delivery drivers.
| 9 | "Bollywood Bedlam" | Eliza Boardman | Joli | 13 March 2010 |
Prank Patrol's newest recruit wants her best friend to believe they are in a music video.
| 10 | "Car Chaos" | Dominic Dilger | Callum | 20 March 2010 |
The prankster gets behind the wheel of a prank that drives his best mate mad.
