= Dev (DJ) =

British radio presenter, DJ and actor

Dev Griffin
- Born: Devin Joseph Jordan Griffin; 23 December 1984 (age 41); Mill Hill, London, England
- Education: The Ravenscroft School
- Occupations: DJ; Actor
- Years active: 2002–present
- Presenting career
- Show: Dev Griffin
- Station: Heart
- Time slot: Monday-Thursday 7pm – 10pm Saturday 12pm – 4pm
- Country: United Kingdom

Devin Joseph Jordan Griffin (born 23 December 1984) is a British radio presenter, DJ and actor, who is most commonly known for presenting Heart's evening show since January 2022 and Heart's Feel Good Weekend since January 2021. He is also known for his former weekend afternoon shows on BBC Radio 1.

== Early and personal life ==
Griffin was born on 23 December 1984 in Hackney, London, United Kingdom, to an Irish mother and a Jamaican father. He and his twin sister are the youngest of four siblings. He was educated at The Ravenscroft School in Barnet, and attended the after-school drama club at the Anna Scher Theatre School, where he met friend and future co-host Reggie Yates.

== Career ==
=== Early career ===
Griffin began his radio career in 2000, aged 16 on pirate radio station Freek FM, specialising in garage and jungle. Here he was known as DJ Devstar and presented with Yates (who used the moniker MC Nobizzi). In 2002, whilst studying for his A Levels at The Ravenscroft School, Griffin landed a job co-presenting the children's interactive TV show Smile (credited as DJ Devstar) alongside Yates, Fearne Cotton and Nev the Bear. Six months into filming, he was approached by BBC Radio 1Xtra to present a Saturday afternoon show with Yates. In 2003, Griffin left Smile to concentrate on his radio career.

=== Acting ===
In 2006, Griffin created and starred in children's sitcom The Crust. He has starred as himself in Friday Download: The Movie, as a result of campaigning at length on air to get himself a role in a B movie.

=== DJ ===
Griffin was a member of the Rebellious music collective and played in venues at Ayia Napa and Faliraki. He opened for Kanye West at the Hammersmith Apollo and Jurassic 5 at the London Astoria. He also played at the Radio 1 Teen Awards.

=== Radio ===
Griffin joined BBC Radio 1Xtra at the launch in August 2002, where he and Yates presented The Lowdown with Reg and Dev on Saturday afternoons. In August 2004, the show moved to Saturday mornings, with Griffin additionally doing the show by himself on Sunday mornings. Yates left 1Xtra in December 2004, leaving Griffin to present both Saturday and Sunday morning shows by himself. Following further schedule changes in September 2005, Griffin moved to Saturday afternoons where he stayed until 2007, when he became presenter of the weekday early morning show.

In July 2009, he moved to BBC Radio 1 to take on the weekend breakfast show. In September, he moved from the weekend slot to replace Greg James as host of the weekday early breakfast show, between 4am and 6:30am. In March 2014, he left the weekday slot and returned to the weekend breakfast show, taking over from Gemma Cairney. He regularly presented The Radio 1 Breakfast Show (sitting in for Nick Grimshaw), the Scott Mills show and the Greg James show as a relief presenter.

In 2018, he and Alice Levine began hosting their own show, Dev & Alice, in the weekend breakfast slot. The duo were moved to the weekend afternoon show the same year. On 9 August 2020 the final show aired, following the announcement of Levine's departure from Radio 1.

In November 2020, BBC Radio 1 announced major scheduling changes for the end of 2020 and 2021. Griffin, along with Huw Stephens and Phil Taggart would not be rejoining the lineup in 2021. The latter two are not leaving the BBC all together, and are instead returning to their former shows on BBC Radio Cymru, BBC Radio 6 Music and BBC Radio Ulster respectively. Instead, Dev departed the BBC, and joined Heart after 18 years with the corporation. His last show was 13:00 – 16:00 on 20 December 2020. He made his Heart debut on Saturday 2 January 2021, when he launched his brand new show 12:00-16:00.

As of January 2022, Dev presents Heart's Evening Show from 7-10pm Monday to Thursday, replacing Mark Wright, who has moved back to weekends.

=== Television ===
In 2016, Griffin and Alice Levine competed in a BBC Bargain Hunt Children in Need special. They took on Radio 4's Nick Robinson and Aasmah Mir. Griffin reached the final of the 2017 series of Celebrity Masterchef, alongside Ulrika Jonsson and eventual winner, Angellica Bell. Griffin participated in the 17th series of Strictly Come Dancing, partnered with professional dancer Dianne Buswell. They became the third Strictly couple to leave the show after losing a dance-off to Emma Weymouth and Aljaž Skorjanec. His elimination caused controversy and complaints from the viewers as his voting lines weren't even open in that week's public vote which meant that the elimination was 'fixed'. In April 2019, Griffin took part in the first series of Celebrity SAS: Who Dares Wins. In October 2020, Dev participated in a celebrity edition of The Chase. In July 2023 Griffin was the subject of an episode of Who Do You Think You Are?, where he discovered that a maternal great-uncle had participated in the Easter Rising at Dublin City Hall.

== Radio presenting ==
"The EE Official Big Top 40" 4-7pm (Cover) 2021–Present (Capital/Heart)

Heart’s Evening Show 7-10pm, January 2022 – Present (Heart)

- Heart's Feel Good Weekend 12-4pm, Saturday, 2 January 2021 – Present (Heart)
- Weekend Afternoon Show 1-4pm, Friday. Saturday and Sunday, 17 November 2018 – (9 August 2020 with Alice Levine) – 20 December 2020 (BBC Radio 1)
- Weekend Breakfast Show 6-10am, Friday, Saturday and Sunday, 29 March 2014 – 11 November 2018 (BBC Radio 1)
- Early Breakfast 4-6:30am, Monday-Friday, 21 September 2009 – 28 March 2014 (BBC Radio 1)
- Weekend Breakfast Show 7-10am, Saturday-Sunday, 4 July 2009 – 20 September 2009 (BBC Radio 1)
- Early Show 6-8am, Monday-Friday, 8 October 2007 – 1 July 2009 (BBC Radio 1Xtra)
- Weekend Afternoon Show midday-2pm, Saturdays, September 2005 – 6 October 2007 (BBC Radio 1Xtra)
- Weekend Morning Show 9am-midday, Saturday'Sunday, 8 August 2004 – September 2005
- Lowdown with Reg & Dev midday-3pm, Saturdays, 17 August 2002 – 31 September 2004 (BBC Radio 1Xtra)

Preceded by Chappers and Dave	Radio 1 Weekend Breakfast Show host 4 July 2009- 20 September 2009	Succeeded by Edith Bowman
Preceded by Greg James	Radio 1 Early Breakfast host 21 September 2009-28 March 2014	Succeeded by Gemma Cairney
Preceded by Gemma Cairney	Radio 1 Weekend Breakfast Show host 29 March 2014 – 11 March 2018	Succeeded by Dev and Alice Levine

== Television presenting ==
- Smile (BBC2)
- Bring It On (BBC1)

== Television acting ==
- The Crust
- Emmerdale
- I Bring You Frankincense
- The Bill
- Hollyoaks
- EastEnders
- Almost Never

== Awards and nominations ==
=== Berlin Music Video Awards ===
The Berlin Music Video Awards is an international festival that promotes the art of music videos.

Year	Nominated work	Award	Result	Ref.
2026	"Sleaze On It"	Best Low Budget	Pending	
