= List of Bear Behaving Badly episodes =

Bear Behaving Badly is a children's comedy which aired on CBBC and starred Nev the Bear and Barney Harwood.

== Series overview ==
Series	Episodes	Originally released	
Series	Episodes	First released	Last released
1	26	3 September 2007	8 October 2007
2	26	1 December 2008	10 March 2009
3	13	7 December 2009	23 December 2009
4	13	6 October 2010	21 December 2010

== Episodes ==
=== Series 1 (2007) ===
No. overall	No. in series	Title	Original release date
1	1	"Homeless and Angry"	3 September 2007
When Nev floods Caretaker Prank's flat, he responds very angrily. To make amends, Barney invites him to stay the night, but Mr Prank has only one thing on his mind - revenge. On discovering Barney is a deep sleeper, Prank seizes the opportunity to be rid of Nev once and for all.
2	2	"Hair Today"	4 September 2007
Caretaker Prank's balding hair problem looks like it's over when he takes delivery of a wig. Mr Prank is delighted the hair is so lifelike, but excitement turns to anger when he discovers it is actually alive! When the crazed hairpiece starts stealing from everyone in the block, there's only one thing for it - Nev and Mr Prank need to fight back.
3	3	"Marathon Nev"	5 September 2007
It is the day of the local fun run and Nev is adamant he is not running. He would much rather watch TV and pig out on crisps and jam sandwiches. When Barney is forced to enter the competition on his own, he's more determined than ever to get Nev fit and asks Mr Prank if he knows a personal trainer. Before long Mr Prank sets about using the opportunity for his own ends and Nev is literally running for his life.
4	4	"Raffle Hassle"	6 September 2007
When Nev accidentally melts Mr Prank's ice cream business Barney and Nev organise a raffle to raise some much-needed funds. Mr Prank thinks it is a great idea, especially as he plans to fix the raffle draw, keep all the money and hold onto the prizes. But competition hots up and cheating the raffle proves tricky when word spreads that the top prize is Mr Prank as your own personal butler for the day.
5	5	"Portrait"	7 September 2007
Mr Prank gets angry when a big portrait of Nev pops up in the hallway over his newly painted walls. Convinced the culprit is Nev, he sets a trap to capture the vandal. When Crazy Keith the koala finds out that Nev is Prank's prime suspect, he decides to do some investigating of his own.
6	6	"Ice-Cream Celebrity Chef"	10 September 2007
Barney discovers Nev and Keith have made kites from the neighbours' post, and forces Nev to return an urgent letter to scary Mr Prank. Prank is thrilled when he opens the mail and discovers that celebrity ice cream chef Gordon Ramshorn is coming to taste his ice cream, but it's a race against time when he realises the letter is a week late and there's less than an hour to prepare for Mr Ramshorn's arrival!
7	7	"Bunfight at the Ice-Cream Corral"	11 September 2007
Mr Prank returns home from a trip to America with a cowboy costume, a dodgy Texan accent and a new chilled-out approach to life. However, Andy Prank soon turns into Angry Pants when he discovers his ice creams have been rustled during his absence. Convinced the culprit is Nev, Prank challenges the bear to a bunfight at noon.
8	8	"A Right Pair of Pants"	12 September 2007
Barney's pet tarantula escapes on the same day that Mr Prank's twin brother is due to visit. In an attempt to outshine the successful brother, Mr Prank dons tweeds and converts the block of flats into Prank Manor. With Prank's nephew Bouncer Boy as butler, and Beatrice as maid, it's only a matter of time before Nev's attempts to catch the spider cause chaos and expose the facade.
9	9	"Treasure Hunt"	13 September 2007
After a visit from Pirate Doug, Nev sets out to find mystery treasure that's buried somewhere in the flat. When Prank catches wind of the hunt, he's convinced the treasure could be the deeds to the apartment block and wants the booty all for himself. Who will uncover the treasure first and what will it be?
10	10	"Magic Box"	14 September 2007
When a mystery trunk is mistakenly delivered to Nev and Barney's front door, magic starts occurring in the flat. Soon, Barney is vanished, rabbits have invaded the living room and Crazy Keith the Koala is turned into a cushion. Nev must use some magic of his own to reverse the damage.
11	11	"That Sinking Feeling"	17 September 2007
When the sink in Barney's kitchen explodes, Caretaker Prank is called in to fix it. Meanwhile, Nev discovers the cause of the problem - a mini-fountain that Crazy Keith has rigged up under the floorboards - but he decides to keep it a secret. There's too much fun to be had watching the exploding sink turn Mr Prank into something resembling a swamp monster.
12	12	"Genie in the Lamp"	18 September 2007
When Caretaker Prank overhears Barney rehearsing his lines for Aladdin, he mistakenly believes that there's a real genie of the lamp residing in the block of flats. Soon, Prank hatches a plan to get his hands on the lamp and his three wishes granted. In the absence of a real genie, Nev and Crazy Keith maintain the pretense, and the outcome for the caretaker can only be disastrous.
13	13	"For Sale"	19 September 2007
Caretaker Prank calls a residents' meeting to make a big announcement. The flats are to be sold to raise much-needed funds for Barney's uncle Rupert. While Mr Prank sets about putting off potential buyers and Beatrice looks for a new place to live, Crazy Keith thinks that he has discovered the answer to all their problems.
14	14	"Pets Win Prizes"	20 September 2007
The local sports centre is holding an exotic pet contest and Mr Prank is desperate to enter. Determined to get his hands on the big cash prize but with no pet of his own, he sets about training Neville for the competition. However, Crazy Keith the koala has other ideas about who should take home the winnings.
15	15	"Clown Law"	21 September 2007
A spate of burglaries in the area has Caretaker Prank on high alert, making it tricky for Beatrice, Barney and Nev to organise his surprise party. When Barney arranges the entertainment, Marvin the clown arrives but Nev becomes suspicious, and all is not quite what it seems.
16	16	"Bin Man Nev"	24 September 2007
Barney and Nev's dirty flat fails to impress Beatrice on her birthday, so the boys action a spring clean. Nev is given the task of taking out the rubbish but finds himself trapped in the apartment for fear of encountering scary Caretaker Prank, who lies in wait in the communal hallway. With nowhere to hide the refuse, Nev turns to Crazy Keith for ideas.
17	17	"Enter Mr Angry Pants Left"	25 September 2007
When Caretaker Prank is the only attendee at Barney's panto auditions, he is awarded the role of Ali Baba's Fortieth Thief. Nev is unimpressed by the decision as the wannabe actor can barely memorise one word of the script. Keith, meanwhile, mistakes Prank for a real thief and it's only a matter of time before the police show up.
18	18	"Unhappy Halloween"	26 September 2007
It's the night before Halloween. While Barney teaches Nev how to trick or treat, Mr Prank and his nephew Bouncer Boy conspire to spook the pair out of their home with a visit from ghostly Headless Henry the Postman.
19	19	"Valentine"	27 September 2007
When the only card Barney receives on Valentine's Day is from his Mum, Nev decides to play cupid. Mr Prank, meanwhile, has hundreds of cards from an unwanted admirer.
20	20	"Strictly Dumb Dancing"	28 September 2007
Barney has been nominated as Best TV Presenter and is all set for the awards ceremony, until he discovers Nev has shrunk his dinner jacket and there is dancing after the meal. When Barney admits he can't dance, Nev sets out to teach him with a little help from Beatrice and the surprisingly agile Mr Prank.
21	21	"Rumble in the Jumble"	1 October 2007
When Nev is blamed by Mr Prank for smashing up Barney's trike, he organises a jumble sale to raise funds for repairs. Among the jumble, Nev discovers Mr Prank's secret diary and uncovers a series of plots to blacken his name.
22	22	"Holiday"	2 October 2007
To their disappointment, Barney and Nev's holiday abroad is suddenly cancelled when Nev accidentally washes the passports and tickets. Caretaker Prank isn't happy that the trip is abandoned either; he had secret plans to use Barney's flat while he was away. In an attempt to ease Barney's gloom, Nev enlists the help of Keith to organise a last-minute holiday with a difference.
23	23	"Robot Rat Catcher"	3 October 2007
After Postie mistakenly identifies Keith the koala as a rodent, Caretaker Prank takes delivery of the Robot Rat Catcher. To Barney's horror, rather than ridding the flat of pests, the robot is uncontrollable and chooses Nev as its target.
24	24	"No Joke"	4 October 2007
When Bouncer Boy receives a joke kit for his birthday, he spends the day at Barney's flat trying the tricks on Nev. In an attempt to put an end to Bouncer's pranks, Nev enlists the help of Crazy Keith the koala and embarks on some practical joking of his own.
25	25	"Blinga Stinga"	5 October 2007
When Mr Prank discovers that he can make a fortune by selling an unusual flavoured ice-cream, he sets about trying to pinch Beatrice's Double Chewy Honey Gooey recipe. Meanwhile, Beatrice is trying to raise some much-needed funds of her own.
26	26	"Mr Ice Cream Head"	8 October 2007
In an attempt to save Mr Prank's ice cream business and her own job, Beatrice ropes the gang into making a TV advert. Barney composes the musical jingle, Beatrice operates the camera and Keith is lined up to edit. The team look certain to succeed, until Nev makes a blundering error...

=== Series 2 (2008-2009) ===
No. overall	No. in series	Title	Original release date
27	1	"Gnome Laughing Matter"	1 December 2008
Aunt Barbara's new gnome turns out to be more than just an ornament, and has been sent to spy on the block. Soon, it discovers Mr Prank's secret ice cream business, that Nev is only pretending to be a dog and that Crazy Keith the Koala is living under the floorboards. If Angry Pants is to keep his care-taking job and if Nev is to stop the pest controllers taking Keith away, they have to act quickly before the gnome tells all.
28	2	"Day of the Terrific"	2 December 2008
Barney buys Nev a new plant which he feeds excessively, with disastrous consequences. Meanwhile, after falling through a hole in the hallway floor, created by Keith who is having an extension made, Aunt Barbara has Caretaker Prank hunting the block for a rodent. Just when Prank is on the verge of discovering the rodent's true identity, Nev's overgrown plant traps everyone in its path. When the plant threatens to eat them, Nev and Caretaker Prank wonder who will save them.
29	3	"It's Cow or Never"	3 December 2008
In a bid to save his secret ice cream business, Mr Prank buys a cow called Mildred to give him the freshest milk possible to improve his recipes. But when it seems like Aunt Barbara is about to discover the animal and his secret business, Prank smuggles Mildred into Barney's flat and ropes Nev into cow sitting. Unfortunately for Nev, Mildred gobbles everything in her path including Keith's beloved girlfriend, Doris!
30	4	"Hypnotwits"	4 December 2008
When Mr Prank's brand new mobile phone goes missing and Nev gets the blame, the blue bear decides to use his newly found skills of hypnotism to get himself out of a tricky situation. Unluckily for Nev, Prank's mobile falls into the paws of Crazy Keith, the koala who uses it to phone his relatives in Australia. After running up a huge phone bill, Keith accidentally drops the mobile down the loo.
31	5	"Curse of the Wearbear"	5 December 2008
Crazy Keith has lost his medallion and without it he is cursed to turn into a hairy, scary, shoe-eating monster. Determined to help Keith's wearbear curse a secret, Nev decides to chain Keith to the loo until the monstrous transformation passes. Just when Nev thinks everyone's shoes are safe, the wearbeary, scary Crazy Keith breaks free from the bathroom and nobody, least of all Aunt Barbara, is prepared for the ensuing havoc.
32	6	"Around the flat in 80 days"	8 December 2008
When Barney goes to Egypt to film a new TV show, Mr Prank moves in to look after Nev but the caretaker's motives for taking the job become clear when he uses Barney's big flat screen TV to watch back-to-back Space Trek episodes on The Astronaut Channel. With Prank making a mess of the flat and threatening to blame Nev, the blue bear decides to go with Keith and Doris on a balloon trip around the world and teaches Prank a lesson he deserves with a little help from Space Trek.
33	7	"Operation Nev"	9 December 2008
When Nev accidentally causes Caretaker Prank's head to be stuck down the loo, Angry Pants calls on a posh private hospital and is determined that Barney and Nev will foot his enormous medical bill. When accident number two happens and Prank finds himself unconscious, Crazy Keith and Nev decide to operate on the caretaker themselves. After all, they'll save on the medical expenses and doctoring can't be that hard, can it?
34	8	"Teething Trouble"	10 December 2008
Neville grows his first tooth and panics when it looks like a scary fang. When Barney notices that Nev isn't coping with his new tooth, he gets Aunt Barbara to look after his bear friend while he's at work. Before long, Aunt Barbara has Nev dressed up like a prize pooch for a visit to the dog dentist and Crazy Keith is making his own plans to yank the tooth out to store unwanted post.. Perhaps Nev's fang like tooth could be useful after all.
35	9	"Everyone Loves Chops"	11 December 2008
Chops, the growling dog who lives in Aunt Barbara's handbag, suddenly emerges as the cutest pooch in the world. Nev gets a massive bout of jealousy. It seems that everyone prefers Chops to Neville. Crazy Keith the koala has an idea. Maybe Keith's new found, rather dodgy skills in fortune telling can help get Nev back in favour.
36	10	"The Perfect Ice Cream Flavour"	12 December 2008
In a bid to come up with the perfect ice cream flavour, Mr Prank experiments with unusual ingredients and ropes in Nev as guinea pig. Soon he suffers comical side effects. Nev proclaims it to be the yummiest ice cream he's ever tasted and Prank is delighted, until Nev grows pink horns, burps rainbows and becomes weightless!
37	11	"Shaken and Stirred"	15 December 2008
Samantha is coming to visit, so Aunt Barbara takes over Barney's flat for a smoothie party, but thanks to Angry Pants and Nev it becomes a disaster! Can Barney Save The Day?
38	12	"Postman Nev"	16 December 2008
Postie sprains her ankle so Nev takes over her rounds and when he opens a parcel he believes is Barney's new sunglasses, Nev wears them, blissfully unaware that he's actually sporting Aunt Barbara's new reading specs. With hampered sight, he's destined to cause havoc delivering important mail to the wrong residents. Before long, Aunt Barbara takes delivery of Barney's new sunglasses, believing them to be the new reading specs she ordered. When she wears them she too can see even less than usual! With neither Nev nor Aunt Barbara able to see properly, chaos ensues and Nev finds himself lost in a part of the block he never even knew existed. Time to call on a friend to save the day!
39	13	"Did Dib Nev"	17 December 2008
When Barney and Nev's planned camping trip is put on hold, Nev decides to camp alone at home but he's not prepared for last minute company. Before long, he is joined by two willing campers in girl guide Aunt Barbara and boy scout Mr Prank who fight to be superior.Meanwhile, Keith plans to pop the question to Doris, and diverts the electricity and heating from the flat into his lair below to make it a special evening. Back upstairs, the change in temperature is fast turning the camping adventure into a survival expedition.
40	14	"Nevquest"	18 December 2008
While Nev is sound asleep, Melanie appears before him as a Fairy Godmother. Before long Nev and his sidekick, Crazy Keith, are on a quest to find the golden socks and free the magical, wintry land of Nevia. Lying in wait to sabotage the quest are Angry Pants the Ogre and the Ice Cream Queen Barbara, who must be defeated in a series of challenges which many before Nev have failed.
41	15	"Back In The Day"	19 December 2008
When Nev accidentally breaks Barney's keyboard, a freak turn of events transports him back to Victorian times, where he struggles to escape the clutches of Angry Pants and his travelling circus including Keith as a performer.Angry Pants spots Nev dancing and immediately sees an opportunity to make his fortune, realising that a performing booty-shaking blue bear will soon attract the circus crowds and make him rich whilst Barbara is determined to put Nev's head on her wall. Nev, meanwhile, has just one thing on his mind. He must discover a way of escaping this time zone, where everyone seems to want a piece of him, and get back to the safety of home.
42	16	"Frog Prince"	5 January 2009
When Barney eats Crazy Keith's spaghetti bolognese and promptly turns into a frog, it seems that nothing will bring him back to normal and save him from the frog-hating Angry Pants. So, Nev and Keith try to convince Barney that being a frog might not be so bad after all. When he fails to be persuaded, Nev hatches a plan to free Barney of froggy misery with kisses, but will it work?
43	17	"Arty Time"	6 January 2009
Mr Prank enters a local art competition in the hope of winning the big cash prize, but Nev's painting is accidentally entered too and when it attracts the interest of a wealthy art collector, and Prank is furious, claiming Nev's picture to be his own work. When the art collector offers to pay handsomely for a second painting, just like Nev's first, old Angry Pants dreams of getting his hands on the money, but first he must learn to paint like Nev! Meanwhile, Aunt Barbara is on the warpath. She is due to host the art competition's presentation party at Barney's flat and wants the block looking its best. Unfortunately for Aunt Barbara, Prank is more interested in his arty, money-making schemes than his boring care-taking duties. And to make matters worse, his polishing makes the hallway floor impossible for anyone to walk on.
44	18	"Out of Control"	7 January 2009
Barney's TV breaks on the day he has invited Beatrice over to watch a romantic movie, so Nev and Keith decide to help out by borrowing the old telly Aunt Barbara is throwing out, but they do not bargain on its remote control having special powers. Nev and Keith are amazed when they accidentally zap old Angry Pants into a weather man, a game show host and a cowboy, but when he is finally zapped inside the TV itself, the grumpy caretaker is even more 'angry pants' than usual and seeks his revenge.
45	19	"Invisible Nev"	8 January 2009
When Barney's rent money goes missing and he is threatened with eviction, Nev and Keith use the gizmos, gadgets and disguises in their new spy kit to do some undercover detective work. Using special binoculars, invisible ink and a skeleton key, the bears must act quickly, as Angry Pants is delighted at the news of Barney's imminent departure, and has spotted an opportunity to use the space to expand his secret ice-cream business.
46	20	"A Star Is Born"	9 January 2009
When Nev and Crazy Keith compose the Jibadeah Rap they become an instant internet hit, transformed into bear band megastars before lunchtime. Keith cannot believe his luck; this is everything he has ever wanted - fame, fortune and fans. But when Nev is more cautious, Barney warns that creative differences could result in Nev and Keith losing their friendship forever. Meanwhile, Melanie is anxious to jump on the bandwagon of success and becomes Bear B Bad's self appointed Manager. When she recruits Caretaker Prank as Head of Security, he gets the hump; he would much rather be a singer in the band. Little does Prank realise that he may eventually get his chance.
47	21	"Love Potion"	12 January 2009
A day without grief is what Caretaker Prank hopes for, but when nagging Aunt Barbara fails to fall under the spell of his love potion, Prank accidentally drinks the mixture himself and falls deeply in love with his nemesis, Nev the bear. While Nev tries to escape the clutches of the loved up, not so 'Angry Pants' Prank, the love potion seeps everywhere and before long Barney gets what he's always wanted. Beatrice falls in love with him but thanks to the spell, poor Barney has fallen so much in love with himself he's unable to notice.
48	22	"Jamageddon"	13 January 2009
Determined to make a proper young lady of Melanie, Aunt Barbara tasks her niece with making jam. Melanie is clueless, so when Mr Prank lets it slip that one sacred pot of his mummy's prize-winning preserve is hidden somewhere in his flat, Melanie plots to steal it and pass it off as her own, with disastrous consequences.
49	23	"Cavebear"	14 January 2009
When Nev and Keith discover a 'prehysterical' Blue Bearasaurus frozen in time, in an ice block at Mr Prank's, they set about making him their friend but when the cavebear goes on the rampage, confusing Aunt Barbara for a woolly mammoth and Prank for a T.Rex, and making Prank's bear allergy twice as bad as usual, the pair hatch a plan to send him back in time.
50	24	"Freaky Fur Day"	15 January 2009
When Nev and Mr Prank are swallowed up by the beanbag in the living room, Barney gets the shock of his life as he pulls the pair free, only to find they've swapped bodies! Too afraid of what will happen if they go back inside the beanbag, Nev continues life allergic to himself but blessed with a newly found height advantage, and Prank endeavours to continue his caretaking duties as a small blue bear, but becomes determined to get his own body back.
51	25	"Wedding Belles"	16 January 2009
When Postie declares her lottery win, greedy Angry Pants asks her to marry him but Nev and Keith know the caretaker's intentions are dishonourable and try everything in their powers to stop the imminent wedding. Nev plans to hide the wedding ring. Without a ring, the wedding will surely be called off! But Prank catches wind of Nev's plan and locks him in the boiler room. With the Quick-a-Vicar booked and on course to conduct the marriage ceremony, Nev needs all the help he can get if he's to break free and save Postie from a lifetime of drudgery. Meanwhile, Aunt Barbara is flummoxed by Postie's agreement to marry Prank but she's determined to make the best of a bad situation. She takes delight in fashioning her niece, Melanie, a dress that looks like a pink meringue to wear for the wedding.
52	26	"Bird Brain"	10 March 2009
When Mr Prank finds out that Beaky, the famous 'tell it like it is' parrot, is coming to Barney's flat, he's delighted. The excitement fades when Beaky's insults are suddenly aimed at him. As the rude remarks fly, Beaky becomes more demanding. When the parrot insists on special food, Barney treks across town to buy it, leaving Nev, Melanie and Beaky's manager, Todd, in charge, and is in for a surprise when he gets back. This episode is also the 2009 Comic Relief special. Guest Star: Jason Donovan

=== Series 3 (2009) ===
No. overall	No. in series	Title	Original release date
53	1	"Robopostie Rampage"	7 December 2009
Postie loses her job and is replaced by a robot who causes havoc in the block. Can Nev and his secret friend, Crazy Keith the koala, stop the machine before it is too late?
54	2	"Nev in the Hood"	8 December 2009
When Nev falls sick with a nasty bout of the bearsels, Keith writes a story to cheer him up. In a tale where Nev becomes Robin of Bearwood Forest and Keith becomes his simple manservant called Will, the pair embark on an adventure to defeat the evil Sheriff of Nottingbarb (Aunt Barbara) and her henchman, Sir Guy of Gisplank (Angry Pants).
55	3	"Sock Mess Monster"	9 December 2009
Fresh from a trip to his ancestral home, Castle McPrank in Scotland, Angry Pants returns to find Barney's washing machine broken and his flat overcome with stinky, unwashed socks. While Mr Prank sets to work fixing the washer, Nev gets the shock of his life when the dirty laundry transforms into a huge sock monster determined to hunt down anything smelly in the block. Forced into partnership, Nev and Angry Pants take on the sock mess monster, with a little help from a mysterious monster hunter, who looks remarkably like Crazy Keith.
56	4	"Crazy Keith: Extreme Koala"	10 December 2009
Barney's cousin, Melanie, pops by to show off Clooney, the adorable school guinea pig, but when Clooney and his good looks go walkabouts, Melanie, Postie and a reluctant Mr Prank start a pet hunt. Meanwhile, free of his cage, Clooney finds his way under the floorboards and into Crazy Keith's lair. Before long, disaster strikes when Keith is convinced that his darling bunny Doris has fallen head over heels in love with Clooney. In a series of daredevil stunts, Nev endeavours to help Crazy Keith impress his beloved Doris and win back her heart for good.
57	5	"A Bear's Tale"	11 December 2009
It is Mr Prank's worst day ever. He has come last in the Historical Caretaking Re-enactment Society Games - again! When Barney convinces Mr Prank he needs to find just one caretaker worse at janitorial challenges to beat, Angry Pants hatches a plan to convince Nev to join the society - surely he cannot fail to win against a blue bear? Thanks to his mate and coach, Crazy Keith the koala, Nev becomes a serious competitor and Mr Prank's nightmare!
58	6	"Two Bears and a Baby"	14 December 2009
When Caretaker Prank's mission to regain his youthfulness goes wrong, he turns into a screaming baby and Nev and Crazy Keith are forced into parenthood.
59	7	"Mr Scary Head"	15 December 2009
Nev and Crazy Keith attempt to spook Barney's cousin Melanie with a scary papier mache mask, but when the mask appears to grow a body and chases them around the block, the prank becomes more frightening than they had ever imagined.
60	8	"Radio Doris"	16 December 2009
It is a hot day and everyone is moving to the beat of Radio Doris, the latest station to hit the airwaves, thanks to DJ Crazy Keith, broadcasting from his secret hideaway under the floorboards. With temperatures soaring and the area's new DJ sensation after a cool down, Nev is sent on a mission for Prank's ice cream. When the quest fails, Crazy Keith concocts a plan to convince Prank to part with his ice cream on his radio show.
61	9	"Nev Through the Looking Glass"	17 December 2009
When Barney and Nev's new mirror proves to have secret powers, Nev and Crazy Keith find themselves living in a topsy turvy world where Barney is the evil caretaker and Mr Prank is Nev's best friend. When Keith announces he has discovered a boring version of himself living in the lair, Nev and Crazy Keith enlist Boring Keith to help find their way back to normality.
62	10	"Cousin Dev"	18 December 2009
When Dev, a blue bear who looks remarkably like Nev, appears at Barney's front door and claims to be Nev's cousin, he is welcomed with open arms. But when Dev reveals creepy horns and an uncontrollable desire to take over the world, wrecking Barney's flat in the process, Nev and Keith wonder if Dev really is who he claims to be.
63	11	"The Strange Case of Mr Prank"	21 December 2009
To everyone's surprise, Mr Prank has been shortlisted for the Caretaker of the Year award. Raiding a suitcase of leftover clothes from past tenants, Prank finds an outfit sure to wow the judges but when he puts it on, his body is taken over by an evil scientist on a mission to rule the world. With Prank behaving so oddly, there is no way he will win Caretaker of the Year, unless Nev and Keith act quickly.
64	12	"Take Me to Your Ice Cream"	22 December 2009
When a large meteor crashes through the ceiling of Barney's flat and lands steaming in his living room, Nev and Crazy Keith use the situation to play a prank on Angry Pants the caretaker. Pretending to be alien invaders who have landed with the meteor from outer space, they set about convincing Angry Pants to wait on them hand and foot. When Mr Prank starts to become suspicious mayhem ensues, only to worsen when a real alien appears and threatens to take Angry Pants prisoner.
65	13	"The Legend of Angry Pants' Gold"	23 December 2009
Mr Prank makes a shock announcement - he is going to retire from caretaking and travel around the world, living off gold he has saved. The news takes everyone by surprise but Crazy Keith is more shocked than most.

=== Series 4 (2010) ===
No. overall	No. in series	Title	Original release date
66	1	"Hero to Zero"	6 October 2010
On the day that Uncle Rupert is coming to tea, and Aunt Barbara wants the block of flats spotless, Crazy Keith tries out his new invention - a machine which gives Nev and Keith superhero powers.
67	2	"Yummy Mummy"	13 October 2010
Love is in the air when an ancient Egyptian mummy comes to life and claps eyes on a heavily-bandaged Aunt Barbara. A whirlwind romance ensues and before long a wedding is planned. Nev and Keith soon discover a darker side to the mummy, but can they find a way to stop the wedding in time?
68	3	"School's In"	20 October 2010
When school's cancelled for the day, Cousin Melanie thinks she has a day off. Aunt Barbara, however, has other plans and sets up a classroom in Barney's flat and everyone must attend. With Mr Prank occupied in lessons, Crazy Keith hatches a plan to get the caretaker's secret stash of ice cream. Meanwhile, Barney and Beatrice are running late for a charity skydive but they need a miracle if they are to be excused from class in time.
69	4	"Nev the Bear Wizard"	27 October 2010
After Barney reads a wizardly bedtime story, Nev wakes in the middle of the night to discover a tiny new door in the bedroom wall. Beyond the door lies the Magic School of Magic and Magic Stuff, where Nev encounters Lord Voldy Prank, who wants to keep Nev trapped there forever so he can use his fur for blue bear ice-cream. A parody of the Harry Potter series
70	5	"Big Dog Little Pants"	3 November 2010
Aunt Barbara wants a lawn in the backyard so her dog, Chops, can run around. Loaded with grass seed and a magical box of growing powder, Caretaker Prank sets out to fulfil her wishes but when a chase ensues with Nev, an accident occurs and the seeds and growing powder spill over Barney's flat. To Nev and Prank's surprise, a grass jungle grows throughout the apartment and to make matters worse, Chops grows too!
71	6	"King of the Swingers"	10 November 2010
When Barney gives Nev a set of mini golf clubs and asks Mr Prank to teach Nev how to use them, they become locked in a crazy golf tournament, which neither can afford to lose. With Prank cheating his way to glory, Nev needs the help of his friend, Crazy Keith the koala, to stand any chance of winning the game.
72	7	"Pimples"	17 November 2010
When Cousin Melanie sees Barney's new electric skateboard she is green with envy and decides to find the cash to buy one for herself. On hearing that Aunt Barbara's favourite health spa has closed for good, she spots a way to raise the money quickly and opens a beauty spa in Barney's flat while he is at work. As the customers keep coming, Melanie enlists the help of Nev to keep her spa open and the cash rolling in.
73	8	"Sing a Song of Secrets"	24 November 2010
Barney discovers an old musical box belonging to Uncle Rupert, but rather than playing music, the box encourages people to sing the truth! With everyone's secrets being revealed in song, Nev is under more pressure than ever to keep the biggest secret of all undisclosed - but for how much longer can Nev keep Crazy Keith the koala and his underground lair hidden from Angry Pants and Melanie?
74	9	"Wibbles"	1 December 2010
When Nev and Keith eat their way through a year's supply of sticky toffee pudding in one sitting, Nev suffers an unusual side effect - he hiccups a small fluffy creature - a Wibble! Before long the whole of Barney's flat is taken over with Wibbles, and they are hungry. Can Nev, Keith and Beatrice act fast enough to stop the Wibbles from eating the whole block of flats?
75	10	"Mission Impawsable"	8 December 2010
When Caretaker Prank's new security system goes nuts, capturing Postie, Aunt Barbara and even Mr Prank himself, Nev and Keith set out on a mission to rescue them in the hope of winning some ice cream for Keith's anniversary dinner with Doris.
76	11	"Alice in Nevvieland"	15 December 2010
Aunt Barbara's going out for the day and Prank is delighted - he'll skive off his caretaking duties, sell ice-cream and make a fortune...or so he thinks. Aunt Barbara has other ideas. Unbeknown to Prank, she's arranged for her sister, Alice, to check on him all day. When Alice arrives on the doorstep, with a white rabbit tucked under her arm and demanding jam tarts are made for the Queen of Hearts, Nev and Prank realise they're in for a day which is even more bonkers than most.
77	12	"Doris of Doom"	20 December 2010
During a raid of Mr Prank's ice cream stash, Crazy Keith's beloved Doris is captured by the caretaker and given to Bandit the cat, who immediately falls in love with her. Nev and Keith embark on a mission to rescue Doris from the moggie's paw but with Prank keeping a very close eye on Nev, it proves more difficult than the duo had first imagined.
78	13	"Caught on Camera"	21 December 2010
When caretaker Prank intercepts an official looking letter for Barney, telling him his library book is overdue, Prank comes up with a wicked plan to rid the flat of Nev and Barney for good. Before long the block is surrounded by paparazzi, the newspapers declare Barney a book thief and his presenting career is on the line. Can Nev and Keith uncover the truth before Barney loses his job and they're evicted from the flat?
