= Sophie Evans =

Sophie Evans may refer to:

- Sophie Evans (performer) (born 1993), Welsh singer, actress and talent show contestant
- Sophie Evans (magician) (died 2025), English magician
- Sophie Evans (actress) (born 1976), Hungarian pornographic actress
