= Gemma Hunt =

British television presenter (born 1982)

- Born: 1 April 1982 (age 44); Wiltshire, England
- Occupation: Television presenter
- Years active: 1997–present

Gemma Hunt (born 1 April 1982) is a British presenter best known for presenting the children's competition show Swashbuckle, from 2013 to 2022. She also presented the CBBC TV series Xchange.

== CBBC ==
Hunt joined the CBBC continuity team in 2002, since then she has presented on the CBBC Channel and also on BBC One and BBC Two. In 2004, she was noticed by CBBC series Xchange and later became a presenter until its close in 2006. She continued to present CBBC until its revamp in 2007. As well as her presenting duties she has made guest appearances on Blue Peter and Smile. More recently she guest presented the food special of Best of Friends alongside Ortis Deley. She has filmed a series with Barney Harwood for CBBC called Barney's Barrier Reef, which began airing on Monday 12 January 2009 at 7:30 on BBC Two. The show returned for a second series, now entitled Barney's Latin America. She was the main presenter on Swashbuckle.

== Education ==
Hunt attended Staverton Primary School in Staverton, Wiltshire, which was then followed by her secondary school education at The John of Gaunt School, Trowbridge, Wiltshire. She graduated with a Bachelor of Arts (Honours) in Media Performance from the University of Bedfordshire in 2003.

== Television ==
Year	Title	Role	Notes	
2003–07	CBBC	Herself	Continuity Presenter	
2004–06	CBBC	Herself	Continuity Presenter	
2004–06	Xchange	Herself	Main Presenter	
2005	Blue Peter	Herself	Guest on Farewell Simon! and also on Blue Peter Champions	
2007	Smile	Herself	Guest Presenter on final episode	
2007	ChuckleVision	Herself	Appeared as a presenter in the episode, "Muscling In"	
2008	Best of Friends	Herself	Guest Presenter alongside Ortis Deley	
2009	Newsround Specials	Herself	Special guest	
2009	Barney's Barrier Reef	Herself	Alongside Barney Harwood	
2009	BAMZOOKi	Herself	Alongside Barney Harwood	
2010	BAMZOOKi	Herself	Alongside Barney Harwood	
2010	Barney's Latin America	Herself	Alongside Barney Harwood	
2010	Hotel Trubble	Herself	TV Presenter	Guest appearance in "Catz N Doggz"
2011	All Over The Place	Herself	Herself	Regular Presenter
2013–2022	Swashbuckle	Gem		Regular Presenter
2015	Hacker's Birthday Bash: 30 Years of Children's BBC	Herself	One-off special	
2015	CBeebies Presents: Alice in Wonderland		One-off special	
2018	CBeebies Presents: Thumbelina	Ladybird	One-off special	
2019	CBeebies Presents: Hansel and Gretel	Mummy Crimble	One-off special	
2020–present	Songs of Praise	Herself	Regular Presenter	
2020	CBeebies Presents: Christmas in Storyland	Empress of Storyland	One-off special	
2021	CBeebies Presents: The Night Before Christmas	Plum	One-off special; Filmed at the Theatre Royal Plymouth	
2022	Today at the Caravan Show	Co-presenter	Two-part series	
2023	CBeebies Robin Hood	Will Scarlett	One-off special	
2024	Twelfth Night!	Valentine	Filmed at Shakespeare's Globe; available on BBC iPlayer	

== Other appearances ==
In 2007, Hunt appeared in an episode of Chucklevision entitled "Muscling In". She was the compere of a strong man contest, which pitted Barry Chuckle against the cheating man mountain Magnus Sorenson (played by Joe Montana).

She has also appeared in pantomimes. In 2007/2008 she played the lead role in Cinderella at the Palace Theatre, Mansfield. In 2008/2009, Hunt played Tinkerbell, alongside fellow CBBC presenter Barney Harwood in Peter Pan at the Pavilion Theatre in Bournemouth. In 2012/2013 she performed at the Churchill Theatre, Bromley in Peter Pan alongside Jennifer Ellison.

In August 2009, she and Harwood presented a BBC Proms concert at the Royal Albert Hall in London entitled "Evolution!", during which they interviewed Sir David Attenborough. In 2010, she guest starred in the CBBC sitcom Hotel Trubble as a television presenter in the episode "Catz N Doggz".

She is one of two lead presenters of the Alpha course film series, alongside Toby Flint, in which she describes her Christian faith.
