= That Sinking Feeling (disambiguation) =

That Sinking Feeling is a 1980 film by Bill Forsyth.

That Sinking Feeling may also refer to:

- "That Sinking Feeling", All Hail King Julien season 4, episode 4 (2016)
- "That Sinking Feeling", Armchair Theatre series 18, episode 10 (1973)
- "That Sinking Feeling", Bear Behaving Badly series 1, episode 11 (2007)
- "That Sinking Feeling", ChalkZone season 3, episode 5b (2004)
- "That Sinking Feeling", Darkwing Duck season 2, episode 1 (1991)
- "That Sinking Feeling", Estate of Panic episode 2 (2008)
- "That Sinking Feeling", Exit episode 3 (2013)
- "That Sinking Feeling", Fast & Furious Spy Racers season 2, episode 2 (2020)
- "That Sinking Feeling", Kirby Buckets season 3, episode 11 (2017)
- "That Sinking Feeling", Kuu Kuu Harajuku season 3, episode 26b (2019)
- "That Sinking Feeling", Lunar Jim season 1, episode 1b (2006)
- "That Sinking Feeling!", MegaMan NT Warrior episode 22 (2002)
- "That Sinking Feeling", Mike, Lu & Og season 2, episode 4a (2001)
- "That Sinking Feeling", Pawn Stars season 6, episode 14 (2012)
- "That Sinking Feeling", Phineas and Ferb season 2, episode 20 (2009)
- "That Sinking Feeling", Rainbow Rangers season 1, episode 2b (2018)
- "That Sinking Feeling", SpongeBob SquarePants season 7, episode 18a (2010)
- "That Sinking Feeling", The Legend of Zelda episode 6a (1989)
- "That Sinking Feeling", The New Adventures of Ocean Girl episode 20 (2000)
- "That Sinking Feeling", The Riddlers series 9, episode 3 (1997)

== See also ==
- "That Stinking Feeling", an episode of the TV series Aladdin
