= Armchair Detectives =

- Genre: Game show, Whodunnit
- Presented by: Susan Calman
- Theme music composer: Paul Arnold and Andrew Barnabas
- Opening theme: Theme of Armchair Detectives ("Composers")
- Country of origin: United Kingdom
- Original language: English
- No. of series: 1
- No. of episodes: 20

Production
- Executive producer: Andy Brereton
- Producer: Carly Brooks Daniel Twist
- Production company: Tiger Aspect Productions

Original release
- Network: BBC One
- Release: 20 November – 22 December 2017

Armchair Detectives is a British gameshow whodunnit series that debuted in 2017. The show was commissioned for BBC One Daytime and is produced by Tiger Aspect Productions (a label of Endemol Shine UK). Hosted by Susan Calman, the series is produced by Carly Brooks and Daniel Twist executive produced by Andy Brereton. The show follows in the footsteps of other similar shows, including Whodunnit? (1972–78), Cluedo (1990–93) and Sleuth 101 (2010). The series was nominated for Best Entertainment Series at the 2018 BAFTA Scotland Awards.

== Development ==
=== Conception ===
The show was created by Carly Brooks, who came up with the idea upon listening to the crime podcast Serial, and investigative journalism podcasts Undisclosed and Truth & Justice. Inspired by the marriage of the medium and genre to turn its listeners into active crime-solvers, she decided to create a television series along these lines. Brooks and Andy Brereton chose the gameshow whodunnit (aka playalong murder mystery) format.

The creative team pitched the show to Jo Street, Commissioning Editor of BBC Daytime, by having her play a game the two had written for a pilot. Brooks recalled: “We had a whiteboard and papers on the wall. For suspects, we printed out pictures of models from Google and gave them names, and I would read out the story". Street, a crime lover with a dog named Columbo, would successfully solve the murder and enjoy playing the game. Street said she loved the idea due to its ambitious and innovative nature. She thought the show struck the right balance between drama and quiz, and had faith in the murder mystery crafting ability of the development team.

Street and BBC Controller Dan McGolpin commissioned 20 episodes, each at 45 minutes in length. The show's pilot episode aired in 2016. The episodes air at 2:15 pm each weekday. The show's catchphrase is: "No one gets away with murder in Mortcliff!"

Street sought to use Midsomer Murders as a tonal influence for the show, and as a result placed the show within the 'Cosy Crime' genre in which violence is downplayed or treated humorously, and the crime and detection take place in a small, socially intimate community. She liked how the format of this popular show allowed for murder while keeping the mood a bit ridiculous and light-hearted. Bodycombe, who led the construction of the first series' 20 cases, described it as "kinda a crossover between Cluedo and Midsomer Murders".

=== Puzzle crafting ===
While Armchair Detectives comes up with the basic outline of the each murder, they utilise in David Bodycombe and Dan Peake (who worked on 'unrelated clue-connecting' gameshow Only Connect) to turn their murders into complete puzzles. Their role is to meticulously scatter the complete picture of means, motive, and opportunity throughout the story in verbal (e.g. testimonial), physical, forensic, audio, visual, written, and other clues.

"They have a spreadsheet with all of our characters and the timeline of the story, and they plot out what every character is doing across all those four days. Even if they're not in the story and we don't see them, they plot that out. They send the Excel sheet to the writer and the writer can't go wrong then. If she wants to do something that's playful or bring someone into a scene, or if we are on set and we realise something doesn't quite work, we have that sheet and we know that this person can't be here at this time because it's plot significant where they are. If they're just away or asleep or whatever they tend to be doing, then they're not in the plot and we can play with them. We just have to make sure they're not doing anything dodgy, so we give them real lives for four days!"

— Creator and producer Carly Brooks, 2017 Den of Geek interview statement regarding the meticulousness of the writing process.

There is a fine line between clarity and obviousness, as well as subtlety and obscurity, which colours decisions. The difficulty of the show can reasonably vary between each episode. According to Den of Geek, the show has elements reminiscent of the Hidden Objects video game genre, in which players must search every inch of the screen (known as "pixel hunting" in gaming) to uncover all the clues. Den of Geek has also described the "dramatic dialogue" as more evocative of such video games than television detective shows due to the efficiency of its storytelling: practically every piece of dialogue and facial expression hints at a character's true or hidden motives.

=== Writing ===
While the format had been done in the past, Brooks felt that gameshow murder mysteries live on due to being entertaining and intriguing, putting viewers into a heightened emotional state of reevaluation, including quizzes and games, and allowing viewers to choose the level of activeness with which to digest the show – either sitting back and enjoying a passive TV drama to be surprised at the end or using problem-solving skills to be one step ahead of the detectives. UKGameShows notes that daytime BBC One viewers already have shown an affinity for this genre, with Father Brown being particularly popular.

Bodycombe confirmed that crucial plot points can be changed later in the writing process, noting that in "Cops and Robbers" some details were changed. The episode "Driving Miss Mortcliff", constructed by Peake, included a homage to a 2017 "Oscars snafu". Bodycombe devised "Six Letters Beginning with M". The butcher's shop in "Deerly Departed (Meat and Greet)" was originally called "The Chop Shop" in its writing stage. Peake recalled that during research he and Bodycombe did for the episode "Derby Day Death", he got "accidentally soaked in the office kitchen". That episode was the first one to air in the series that was constructed by Bodycombe. The episode "Finders Keepers" featured a homage to the British comedy series Detectorists by naming its suspects after characters from that show.

Peake notes that there are some clues that are written into a story that are never mentioned or revealed in the episode either by the confession scene, the contestants, or the host.

=== Casting and characters ===
Calman was chosen as host due to her history as a comedian, as well as her degrees in law and forensic science. The first series was recorded at the same time as Calman's appearances on Strictly Come Dancing.

DI Knight, a "silver-haired deadpan alpha male with a penchant for coffee and dad jokes that rarely land with his colleagues", was conceived by Brooks with the specific character trait of being a person her mum would have a crush on. Roger Nsengiyumva added a youthful presence and playfully mocking dynamic to his DC Slater character. Finally, Scene Of Crime Officer Simmons was written specifically to be a strong intelligent female character, who is personable and has a gallows sense of humour.

Brooks has stated that she desires there to be further development into the lives of the detective team, specifically a "Will they or won't they?" story between DC Slater and SOCO Simmons.

The 15 studio contestants were cast via crime fan communities. For instance, a couple from Ayr, who run the room escape company Riddle Rooms, were sent an email directly. Some of the contestants are real-life detectives. Brooks wanted to cast people who would simultaneously take the murders seriously and sincerely in an attempt to solve them, as well as embrace the humour and fiction of the show to have an enjoyable time solving them. According to Brooks, "You have to commit to the tone of the show to really understand the crimes". She deliberately avoided having a cash prize as she feared it would ruin the cooperative nature of the show and replace it with toxic competition.

=== Filming ===
Tiger Aspect chose to use East Lothian as the filming location of the fictional Mortcliff; areas featured include Tranent, Longniddry, Cockenzie/Port Seton, North Berwick, Inveresk, and Gullane. The production team filmed on location over a period of five weeks in summer 2017, and collaborated with the East Lothian's Filming Charter council on the shoot. The show did not comment on production while filming scenes, in order to not reveal any details that would ruin the mysteries. It was originally believed that the show would have a crew of 55, including 20 actors.

The set for the gameshow portion was designed by the show's designer. Filming for this part took place in two weeks, with three episodes filmed per day. A trial run was done before shooting began.

=== Future ===
Calman expressed an interest into seeing the show continue, but later confirmed on 16 July 2018 that a second series will not be made.

Endemol Shine UK, the production company that owns the Tiger Aspect label, has hopes for more international sales than they've had with the gameshow Pointless. UKGameShows notes that English-speaking countries can use the existing in-universe Mortcliff footage with a new host and contestants, while others might either dub the existing footage or reshoot it locally, and that in any scenario the difficult part (the crafting of cases) has already been done.

== Plot and gameplay ==
Described as "immersive investigation", the game encourages viewers to play along with the in-studio detectives. Each episode features a story set in the fictional Scottish village of Mortcliff (taken from "mort" meaning death and "cliff" as in cliffhanger). The in-universe investigations are led by detectives DI Knight and DC Slater, and forensic expert Officer Simmons.

A team of three "armchair detectives" try to solve the murder. While there is no physical interaction with suspects, players view footage of events, such as the finding of the body and the victim's last known whereabouts. They are also able to view physical evidence such as forensics or photos. The successful player(s) win a golden magnifying glass. When characters in the story are introduced their names are offered as a caption, and information about the case is added to the in-universe detective's whiteboard in a character web.

The host, Calman, does not know who the killer is and plays along with the contestants without advancing any of her own ideas, though she can guide contestants to think about certain points, and has accused her own suspect on a few occasions.

== List of episodes ==
=== Series 1 (2017) ===
No.	Title	Original air date	Winner(s)	Contestants
1	"Watercolour Crime"	20 November 2017	Kathryn	Kathryn, Roger and Wisdom
2	"Patently Murder"	21 November 2017	None	Ellouise, Audrey and Dipak
3	"The Jury's Out"	22 November 2017	Simon; Charley	Simon, Bola and Charley
4	"Derby Day Death"	23 November 2017	Toria; Laura	Toria, Ashley and Laura
5	"Deerly Departed"	24 November 2017	Krystyna; James	Gregor, Krystyna and James
6	"Cops and Robbers"	27 November 2017	Roger	Ashley, Roger and Bola
7	"The Uninvited Guest"	28 November 2017	Simon; Kathryn	Simon, Laura and Kathryn
8	"Finders Keepers"	29 November 2017	Wisdom; James; Toria	Wisdom, James and Toria
9	"Six Letters Beginning with M"	30 November 2017	Gregor; Ellouise	Gregor, Ellouise and Charley
10	"Pigeon Detectives"	1 December 2017	Krystyna; Dipak; Audrey	Krystyna, Dipak and Audrey
11	"School's Out for Murder"	4 December 2017	James; Kathryn; Bola	James, Kathryn and Bola
12	"The High Class Killer"	5 December 2017	Simon; Roger	Simon, Roger and Ellouise
13	"Driving Miss Mortcliff"	6 December 2017	Audrey; Laura	Audrey, Wisdom and Laura
14	"Tell Tale Signs"	7 December 2017	None	Toria, Dipak and Charley
15	"A Can of Worms"	8 December 2017	None	Krystyna, Ashley and Gregor
16	"Appetite for Murder"	11 December 2017	Wisdom	Wisdom, Toria and Simon
17	"What Became of Miranda?"	12 December 2017	None	Roger, Gregor and Laura
18	"White Collar Crime"	13 December 2017	None	Charley, Krystyna and Kathryn
19	"Am Dram Damned"	14 December 2017	James; Ashley; Audrey	James, Ashley and Audrey
20	"Mistletoe and Crime"	15 December 2017	Dipak	Bola, Dipak and Ellouise

== Critical reception ==
In anticipation of the series, and comparing it to Whodunnit, ObservationDeck wondered how innovative the series could be. Den of Geek deemed the show "brilliant fun", noting that Calman brings a "delightful, hilarious persona". The site continued by arguing that while the "pleasingly old fashioned" show (due to its "lovely Scottish accents and scenery, goofy humour, and breezy, gossipy chat") does contain some "hilariously petty reasons to kill", it is the most successful attempt at the playalong murder mystery format.

UKGameShows deemed the show "infectious" and surmised that it might become cult television. The site deemed the acting as a bit hammy, but that this is a deliberate style choice because characters need to convey much information via clues and so stereotypical verbal or non-verbal clues need to be used as a shortcut for the audience to latch onto emotions, thoughts, and relationships. They thought the inserts have a slow and exaggerated pace. The site noted that the case does not have a repertory company, meaning that the same actors do not play different roles in each episode. Herald Scotland noted the show's low budget, the lack of a cash prize, and the Acorn Antiques-style acting, ultimately deeming it a "cuddly" crime show. The Times thought that the show was a "lethally mild" piece of afternoon entertainment, jokingly offering favourable alternatives based on the viewers' tastes: better locations with A Place in the Sun, more "vicious crimes" with Come Dine with Me, and more "females being harassed or tortured" with Loose Women.
