= The Lie (game show) =

- Genre: Game show
- Presented by: Jonathan McCrea
- Country of origin: Ireland
- Original language: English
- No. of series: 2
- No. of episodes: 49

Production
- Camera setup: Multiple-camera setup
- Running time: 30 minutes
- Production companies: STV Productions and Motion Content Group

Original release
- Network: TV3; STV; S4C
- Release: 17 February 2014 – 2015

The Lie is a quiz show co-produced by 3Studios, STV Productions and Motion Content Group.

On the show a team of two people must decide which of the statements given is the lie in order to progress and win money.

== Versions ==
The Irish version of the show is on TV3, hosted by Jonathan McCrea. The first show aired on 17 February 2014 at 20:00. Episodes air on Mondays and Fridays. A second season premiered in January 2015 with 40 episodes and is now stripped with five episodes a week.

The Scottish version was shown on STV, presented by Scottish comedian Susan Calman. It first aired in the spring of 2014.

A Welsh language version of the show premiered on S4C in January 2015 entitled Celwydd Noeth ("Bare-Faced Lie"), hosted by Nia Roberts.
