= Allyson Brown =

British actress and singer

Allyson Brown (born 1984 or 1985, sometimes credited as Allyson Ava-Brown) is a British actress and singer. She played Beatrice in Bear Behaving Badly. She has also appeared in Secret Diary of a Call Girl, Sea of Souls, Holby City and Earth 2. She won a MOBO Award for being the Best Unsigned Act in 1998. She was in the 2008-2009 Les Misérables London production playing Fantine. She also went on The Voice and sang "Somebody Else's Guy" but did not get through. In 2015 she starred in theatre production The Etienne Sisters, written and directed by Ché Walker, and in 2019 she played Angelica Schuyler in the West End production of Hamilton.
