= Barney's Barrier Reef =

2009 British documentary

Barney's Barrier Reef is a British documentary program launched by the CBBC in 2009. It was presented by Barney Harwood and Gemma Hunt and featured 20 episodes.

The program, filmed in north Queensland, shows the links between animals from the Great Barrier Reef. It involves at least 10 to 12 animals each episode. Barney used an animal as a 'little cheat' as described by Gemma, because it was Humans. Barney's Barrier Reef mostly involves fish since the Great Barrier Reef is in an ocean. Land animals are hardly used in this series, unlike the companion series Barney's Latin America, although some fish, like the blind sea shrimp, are featured.

== Critical reception ==
Kerrie Murphy of The Weekend Australian called the series "overdone" but enjoyable overall.
