= Bamzooki =

British children's game show

- Also known as: Bamzooki: Street Rules
- Genre: Children's Game show
- Presented by: Jake Humphrey (2004–06); Barney Harwood (2009–10); Gemma Hunt (2009–10)
- Voices of: Richie Webb
- Country of origin: United Kingdom
- Original language: English
- No. of series: 4
- No. of episodes: 86

Production
- Running time: 30 minutes

Original release
- Network: CBBC
- Release: 8 March 2004 – 3 February 2010

Bamzooki (stylized as BAMZOOKi) is a British children's television game show broadcast on the CBBC channel, in which teams compete in knockout tournaments using virtual creatures known as "Zooks". These creatures were designed by contestants using a free computer-generated toolkit developed by Gameware Development, available for download from the CBBC website. The original run, hosted by Jake Humphrey, aired from March 2004 to 2006 over three series. A 13-episode revival, Bamzooki: Street Rules, hosted by Barney Harwood and Gemma Hunt, aired from November 2009 to February 2010 with updated graphics, physics, and contests.

The original series premiered in March 2004 on the CBBC channel, and was presented by Jake Humphrey. It initially ran until 2006, airing over forty episodes across three seasons. A new thirteen-part revival series, set on a street, titled "Bamzooki: Street Rules”, premiered in November 2009 with new presenters—Barney Harwood and Gemma Hunt—, a revamped toolkit with improved graphics and physics, new contests, new "House Zooks," a new format, and a "Zook Doctor."

== Technology ==
A Zook is an autonomous creature designed by users and contestants on the gameshow. Created using 3D primitives, Zooks move autonomously based on IK points assigned by the designer.

Inspired by nature, contestants design Zooks to compete in various competitions. The toolkit for designing Zooks is available for download on the show's website. Recently, two new features have been added to the Zook-Kit, allowing users to simulate TV contests and replay their Zooks' performances from multiple angles.

Gameware's Creature Labs team uses artificial life programming techniques to provide the Zooks' autonomous movement and behavior. This is integrated with the BBC's virtual studio system for real-time visualizations in a studio setting.

The Bamzooki Zook Kit enables users to build virtual creatures, called Zooks, and test them in a real-time, physically simulated environment. Kids used this software to build Zooks and submitted them to the BBC. Selected teams were invited to the studio to enter their Zooks in various contests. The new series "Bamzooki: Street Rules," which aired in November 2009, features fully interactive contests where participants direct their Zooks by shouting instructions, as well as contests set on the streets and rooftops. Thirty-six teams were selected for the championships, which included nine heats, a semi-final, and a final.

The software and manual were freely available from the BBC website. Although designed to be easy enough for children to use, it is highly flexible and versatile. Zooks are constructed from basic components that users shape and assemble. Users are not restricted to particular body designs or topologies, although the control system uses a standard Braitenberg architecture.

The BBC's Virtual Studio technology was used to enable real-time composition of the 3D-rendered graphics with live camera feeds. Each studio camera has a dedicated render PC to render the virtual scene from that camera's perspective. To know what a studio camera's perspective is, each camera is fitted with a second "Free-D" camera that points towards the ceiling. On the ceiling are reflective, circular bar codes. The 3-D camera data is fed to a computer system that identifies the targets on the ceiling and calculates the camera's position and orientation 50 times a second. Series 4 adopted Vinten tracking peds instead of FREE-D as an alternative approach.

The contest runs in real time on a networked PC. All the clients receive contest scene information and render their scenes from their studio camera's point of view. A bank of chroma key boxes then composites the virtual and the live feed together to provide a real-time composite. This video stream can be sent to the studio camera monitors so that camera operators can view the composite and hence follow the action in real time.

The toolkit (a modified version of the Bonsai artificial life program) has at times been utilized by adults for their own purposes, including research.

== Community ==
A popular aim in Bamzooki was to get a Zook into the galleries or leagues, as they are often the most viewed and downloaded Zooks. To get into the leagues, you have to make a maxed-out zook on a specific event; these events are sprint, block push, hurdles, high jump, and lap. Every month, the CBBC Bamzooki site releases a new gallery based on a topic like "space zooks" or "spooky zooks." For every gallery, there are 16 spaces, and the Zook moderators choose the best-looking zooks to take those places. A toolkit was praised for its educational value, teaching basic principles of physics, animation, and programming. Although primarily aimed at children, the software was sophisticated enough to be used by adults for research purposes.

A relatively new league is the Ultimate Zook Leaderboard, where scores from all the trials are aggregated into one score, which zooks are then compared on.

== Episodes ==
Series	Start date	End date	Episodes
1	8 March 2004	2 April 2004	24
2	7 March 2005	1 April 2005	20
2	5 August 2005		20
3	13 April 2005		29
3	25 February 2006	26 March 2006	29
4	11 November 2009	3 February 2010	13
