= Susan Calman =

Scottish comedian (born 1974)

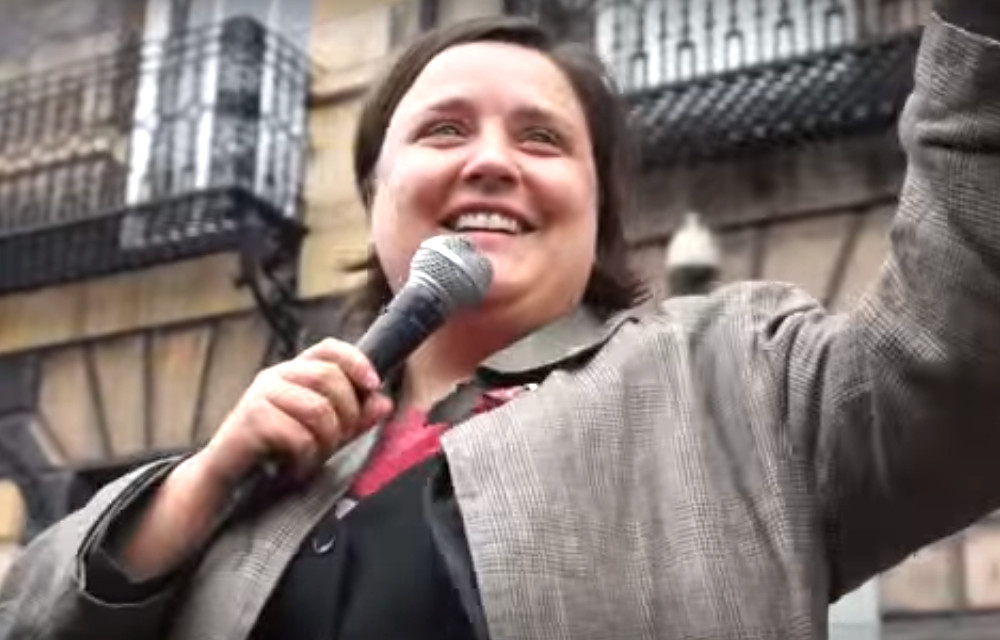
- Calman outside the Russian Consulate in Edinburgh in 2013
- Born: Susan Grace Calman; 6 November 1974 (age 51)
- Education: University of Glasgow (LLB)
- Occupations: Stand-up comedian, television presenter
- Television: Extreme School (2013–2014); All Over the Place (2014; 2016–present); Top Class (2016–2020); The Boss (2017–2018); Armchair Detectives (2017–2018); Hogmanay Live (2019–2020); Great British Menu (2020)
- Relatives: Kenneth Calman (father)

Susan Grace Calman (born 6 November 1974) is a Scottish comedian, television presenter, writer, and lawyer.

She has written and starred in two series of her radio sitcom Sisters, two series of stand-up show Susan Calman is Convicted and a series of stand-up show Keep Calman Carry On, all on BBC Radio 4. She was one of the relief presenters for Fred MacAulay on his BBC Radio Scotland show MacAulay and Co which ran until March 2015.

Television work includes playing "Miss Adventure" in the second season of the CBBC show School of Silence. She has also presented the CBBC programme Extreme School and providing the comic voiceover on the CBBC series Disaster Chefs. She is a team captain on the BBC Northern Ireland comedy panel show Bad Language, and has been a panellist on a number of BBC Radio 4 shows including The News Quiz and I'm Sorry I Haven't a Clue.

She has presented the children's game show Top Class on CBBC, quiz show The Lie on STV, and the BBC One shows The Boss and Armchair Detectives. In 2017 Calman was a contestant on BBC's Strictly Come Dancing alongside professional dancer Kevin Clifton, finishing in seventh place. In 2020, she presented the BBC Two cookery challenge show Great British Menu, before being replaced by Andi Oliver in 2021.

== Education and legal career ==
Calman was educated at the High School of Glasgow, a fee-paying independent school, and then studied law at the University of Glasgow, winning a Judge Brennan scholarship and a three-month stint in North Carolina working with criminals on death row. During her seven-year career in corporate law, she gradually became dissatisfied with working as a specialist in freedom of information and data protection and developed her stand-up comedy in the evenings, eventually giving up her job with Dundas & Wilson to develop her career in comedy.

Calman was awarded an honorary degree from the University of Glasgow in 2018; she was honoured for her work in broadcasting and comedy, as well as campaigning on issues related to LGBT rights and mental health.

== Comedy and television career ==
Calman reached the semi-finals of the BBC New Comedy Awards in 2005 and was a finalist in the Funny Women competition in 2006. The Channel 4 sketch show Blowout won a Scottish BAFTA in 2007, with Calman among the cast. In 2009, she won Best New Scottish Comedian at the Real Radio Variety Awards.

Between 2011 and 2013, Calman played therapist Nadine in the comedy Fresh Meat. Her debut Radio 4 solo series, Susan Calman is Convicted won the 2013 Writers' Guild of Great Britain Awards for 'Best Radio Comedy'. She also featured in the 2012 sitcom Dead Boss for BBC Three.

In 2013, Calman wrote about receiving online abuse after joking about the Scottish independence referendum on the Radio 4 satirical comedy programme The News Quiz, including accusations of betraying her country, and of being "racist" towards other Scots.

Since 2014, Calman has been a regular panellist on the CBBC panel show The Dog Ate My Homework, and has appeared in 10 episodes of the show. In July 2014, Calman appeared in the BBC Scotland one-off stand-up/sketch show Don't Drop the Baton, which featured sketches about the 2014 Commonwealth Games, and narrated the BBC Three dating show Sexy Beasts. She is a frequent guest panellist on BBC Two's QI and on BBC Radio 4's The News Quiz.

In September 2017, she became the presenter of the BBC One daytime quiz show The Boss. Calman also presented Armchair Detectives, a BBC One daytime show first broadcast in November 2017. In December 2017 Calman was voted TV Star of the Year by readers of the Radio Times.

Calman has fronted the Channel 5 travel show Secret Scotland since February 2019.

In 2018, Calman's podcast Mrs Brightside - A cheerful look at depression was first broadcast on BBC Sounds.

On 1 October 2019, Calman was announced as the new presenter for series 15 of Great British Menu on BBC Two. Filming took place in Stratford-upon-Avon and was completed in November 2019. The show was to be broadcast in spring 2020.

Her 2019 show Susan Calman Makes Me Happy premiered on BBC Radio 4 on 20 November 2019. The show also featured her wife, Lee.

Since 2020, Susan Calman has been the 'face of' the Bank of Scotland, starring in multiple adverts.

== Writing ==
In May 2016, Calman published her first book, entitled Cheer Up Love: Adventures in depression with the Crab of Hate. Her second book Sunny Side Up: a story of kindness and joy followed in September 2018. A lifelong fan of Doctor Who, Calman was a contributor to the YA anthology The Day She Saved the Doctor: Four Stories from the TARDIS, published in March 2018. The title of Calman's story is Clara & The Maze of Cui Palta.

== Strictly Come Dancing ==
On 15 August 2017, Calman was announced as the ninth contestant on series 15 of Strictly Come Dancing. She was partnered with professional dancer Kevin Clifton. They were the ninth pair to be eliminated, in week 10 of the competition. In a 2018 interview, Calman said she felt happiest "dancing with Kevin Clifton on Strictly."

Calman was criticised for not insisting on a same-sex dance partner for Strictly Come Dancing, but she rejected the comments as being unfair, saying: "No one is holding me hostage in this room, making me wear a dress and dance with a man. I want to learn how to dance... I have protested, I have picketed, I have fought, I have been spat on, I have been punched — and I want to dance."

== Personal life ==
Calman is the daughter of Ann Wilkie, a former primary school deputy head, and Sir Kenneth Calman, an oncologist. Her father was chancellor of the University of Glasgow and former chief medical officer for Scotland, then England and Wales. She has an older brother and sister.

Calman came out as a lesbian in 1993 at the age of 19, and has spoken of her difficulties growing up gay in Glasgow. "It wasn't easy, not at all. Glasgow is a lovely city, but when I was growing up there was one lesbian bar, and there was a club for men, but there was no internet, there was no way of finding out [about other people]." The Times commented in 2009 that Calman's "status as a diminutive lesbian – she is 4 ft 11 in [1.50 m] – gives a certain grist to her mill but, her Hobbit-like stature aside, what strikes you about her is her chirpy, optimistic level-headedness."

After nine years together, Calman and her partner Lee, who is also a lawyer, had a civil partnership ceremony in 2012. They married in 2016. They keep cats, and in 2018 had five. They live in Glasgow.

Calman says she was "desperately unhappy" as a teenager, and self-harmed and attempted suicide at 16. She has openly discussed her experience with depression in interviews and in her books.

== Filmography ==
=== Television ===
| Year | Title | Role | Channel | Notes |
|---|---|---|---|---|
| 2010 | How Not to Live Your Life | Margaret | BBC Three | Series 3 - Don the Musical |
| 2011 | Dani's House | Sandwich Lady | CBBC | |
| 2011 | Rab C. Nesbitt | Irene Cordish | BBC Two | |
| 2011–2013 | Fresh Meat | Nadine | Channel 4 | Two episodes |
| 2012 | Dead Boss | Fatty | BBC Three | |
| 2012 - present | QI | Guest panellist | BBC Two | 13 episodes |
| 2013 | School of Silence | Miss Adventure | CBBC | Season 2 |
| 2013 | 8 Out of 10 Cats | Guest | Channel 4 | |
| 2013–2014 | Extreme School | Presenter | CBBC | |
| 2014 | Don't Drop the Baton | | BBC Scotland | |
| 2014 | Sexy Beasts | Narrator | BBC Three | |
| 2014–2015 | The Lie | Presenter | TV3, STV, S4C | |
| 2014, 2016–2017 | All Over the Place | Co-presenter | CBBC | |
| 2016 | Tracey Ullman's Show | Romana | BBC One | |
| 2016 | Bad Language | Team captain | BBC Northern Ireland | |
| 2016–2020 | Top Class | Presenter | CBBC | |
| 2017 | Strictly Come Dancing | Contestant | | Series 15 |
| 2017 | Armchair Detectives | Presenter | | |
| 2017–2018 | The Boss | Presenter | BBC One | |
| 2018 | Before They Were Stars | Presenter | Channel 5 | Replaced Dale Winton following his death in April 2018. |
| 2018 | Home from Home | Lorraine Sykes | BBC One | |
| 2018–present | Undercover Girlfriends | Narrator | Channel 5 | |
| 2019 | Hogmanay Live | Presenter | BBC Scotland; BBC One Scotland | |
| 2019–present | Secret Scotland | Presenter | Channel 5 | |
| 2020 | Great British Menu | Presenter | BBC Two | |
| 2021 | Christmas Cruising with Susan Calman | Presenter | Channel 5 | Two Christmas specials |
| 2021–present | Susan Calman’s Grand Day Out | Presenter | Channel 5 | |
| 2021–present | Susan Calman's Grand Week by the Sea | Presenter | Channel 5 | Second five-part series airing in August 2022 |
| 2022 | Big Antique Adventure with Susan Calman | Presenter | Channel 5 | Five-part series |
| 2022 | Cruising the Canary Islands with Susan Calman | Presenter | Channel 5 | |
| 2022–present | Cruising with Susan Calman | Presenter | Channel 5 | |
| 2024 | Great British Cities with Susan Calman | Presenter | Channel 5 | Six-part series |

== Stand-up DVD releases ==
- 2015 – Lady Like (Go Faster Stripe)

== Books ==
- 2016 – Cheer Up Love: Adventures in Depression with the Crab of Hate, Published by Two Roads (ISBN 978-1473632004)
- 2018 – Doctor Who: The Day She Saved The Doctor, Published by BBC Children's Books
- 2018 – Sunny Side Up: a story of kindness and joy, published by Hachette UK (ISBN 9781473663893)
