= Top Class =

British children's quiz show

- Genre: Children's; Game show
- Directed by: Tony Grech-Smith (2016-18); John L Spencer (2019)
- Presented by: Susan Calman
- Composer: Craig Brown
- Country of origin: United Kingdom
- Original language: English
- No. of series: 5
- No. of episodes: 75 (inc. 5 specials)

Production
- Executive producers: Simon Marsh; Melissa Hardinge; Barry Hart
- Running time: 30 minutes
- Production company: ITV Studios

Original release
- Network: CBBC
- Release: 12 September 2016 – 1 January 2020

Top Class is a British children's television quiz show produced by ITV Studios for CBBC.

== Format ==
Although the competition is open to all state schools, only 16 teams per series make it through the audition stage and proceed to take part. All competitors are in Year 6 in England or Wales, and Primary 7 in Scotland or Northern Ireland.

Each round includes questions taken from the National Curriculum Key Stage 2, starting with a buzzer question. The team which answers correctly takes control of the game and is given a further four questions to answer. The subjects includes Maths, English, Science, History, Geography and News. There is also Test the Teacher, where the class' teacher answers pop-culture questions, and Pet Subjects, where the class chooses a subject to be questioned on. Pet Subjects chosen include CBBC series The Dumping Ground and the 2015 general election.

In series 3, the "Lightning" Round was introduced to start each contest; this features a puzzle, such as a word search or crossword, on two specific subjects, one for each team for a chance to score some points on the board before the subject rounds.

Each contest ends with "The Battle of the Buzzers"; teams have 90 seconds to answer as many quick-fire questions as they can on the buzzer.

== Transmissions ==
=== Series ===
Series	Start date	End date	Episodes
1	12 September 2016	30 September 2016	15
2	25 January 2017	3 May 2017	15
3	3 September 2017	10 December 2017	15
4	29 July 2018	4 November 2018	15
5	29 September 2019	22 December 2019	15

=== Specials ===
Date	Entitle
13 December 2016	Christmas Special
7 April 2017	Celebrity Special
17 December 2017	Christmas Special
31 December 2017	Young Celebrities Special
11 November 2018	Celebrity Special
19 December 2019	Christmas Special
19 December 2019	Christmas Special
1 January 2020	CIS is the special
