= School of Silence =

British children's television game show

- Genre: Comedy; Children’s Game show
- Written by: George Sawyer (Series 1), Gray Croft (Series 2)
- Directed by: Ollie Brack (Series 1), Jack Jameson (Series 2)
- Presented by: Barney Harwood (Series 1 Presenter), Simon Greenall (Series 2 Narrator)
- Composer: Dobs Vye
- Country of origin: United Kingdom
- Original language: English
- No. of series: 2
- No. of episodes: 33

Production
- Executive producers: Damon Pattison, Steve Pinhay (Series 1), Mike Griffiths (Series 2)
- Producers: Rob Hyde (Series 1), Matt Smith (Series 2)
- Production locations: Glasgow, BBC Pacific Quay (BBC Scotland)
- Editor: Manus Fraser (Series 1)
- Running time: 30 minutes
- Production company: Lucky Day Productions

Original release
- Network: BBC One (Series 1), CBBC (Series 2)
- Release: 14 September 2009 – 13 April 2012

School of Silence was a British children's TV series which aired on CBBC. The show ran from 14 September 2009 until 13 April 2012. In the show, a group of noisy children in a particular area of Britain are sent to the titular "School of Silence", where they must learn to be silent. The first series was presented by Barney Harwood, and the second series by Simon Greenall, as a narrator.

The children have 3 classes at the school, followed by a final exam. The headmistress, Miss Gobstop, is able to monitor the noise levels using a machine named the "Gobstop 2000". In the second season the machine is upgraded, to the "Gobstop 3000". In the first series, if the students pass the final exam, they graduate and take the "Golden Gobstopper" as a prize. In the second series, they get prizes from the confiscated cupboard. If they fail, they are expelled. In the first series, the expelled students receive a whoopee cushion, while in the second series they receive nothing.

The first class is with Mr. Gross. His challenges included throwing wet toilet paper at a target called “Flying Toilet Paper”, the “Maggots Foot Spa” where the chosen participant would put their bare feet in a tub of maggots or in similar challenge where the chosen child would put their bare feet into slime filled boots which was called “Gunge Boot.” Other challenges included “Compost Ball Roulette” where the chosen child would have to crack a ball filled with either gunge or flour on their own forehead, a “Slush Avalanche” where one of the participants would pour freezing cold ice down their friends back & others named “Hairy Scary Werewolf” & “Pink Poodle” where the chosen child would be covered in treacle and artificial hair. This class was present in both series.

In the first series, the second class is with Nora Nugget and her assistant, Britney Biscuit. In her challenge, students combine different foods, and one student is chosen to eat the final product of these combinations.

In the second series, Nora and Britney are replaced by Miss Adventure, a geography teacher and explorer. Challenges in her class involve custard pies to the face, contestant's faces being painted on, and riding adults dressed as camels.

In the first series, the third class is taken by Mrs. Bunsen, whose challenges are science-based.They included the “Human Carwash” where the chosen participant would endure shaving foam, wax (which was gunge), and a water rinse spray on the head and “Instant Snowman” where the chosen child would have to wear a black felt shirt and their friends would be throwing artificial snow at them to see if it would stick or not.

In the second series, the third class is taken by Mr Les Prance, a performing arts teacher. Challenges in his class are theatrically based, such as copying exercise routines whilst joined at the ankles and performing ballet with dog toys strapped to their shoes.

In the first series, the Final Exam is supervised by Colonel Kittens. The children are put in stocks, barefoot. For 90 seconds the students were tickled on their bare feet, as the teacher made faces and used a fart machine, to try to make them laugh or scream.

In the second series, Colonel Kittens was replaced by a German professor, named "The Professor", and his glove puppet assistant, ‘Herr Helmut’. In the Final Exam contestants are strapped to chairs and are confronted with Silly String, Pies and Gunge.

== Characters ==
=== Series 1 (2009) ===
Miss Gobstop- Headmistress (Natacza Boon)

Mr Gross- Form Tutor (George Sawyer)

Nora Nugget- Chief Dinner Lady (Daniel Wiltshire)

Britney Biscuit- Nora's Silent Assistant (Jolana Lee)

Miss Bunsen- Science Teacher (Nicole Davis)

Colonel Kittens- Army Colonel (George Sawyer)

Nurse- The School Nurse (Jolana Lee)

=== Series 2 (2012) ===
Miss Gobstop- Headmistress (Natacza Boon), absent for two episodes.

Mr Gross- Form Tutor and Deputy Headmaster for two episodes (George Sawyer)

Miss Adventure- Explorer (Susan Calman)

Mr Les Prance- Performing Arts Teacher (Junior Simpson)

The Professor- German Science Professor (Billy Kirkwood)

Nurse- The School Nurse (Leah MacRae)

Hammy the Hamster- The School's Hamster (voiced by Dave Chapman)

== List of challenges ==
=== Series 1 (2009) ===
==== Mr Gross’s class ====
- What You Looking At? (Ep1,7)- The chosen child is forced to look at Mr Gross whilst he makes funny faces at them for 30 seconds.
- Gunge Boot (Ep1,11)- The chosen child is made to wear Wellington boots without socks which one of their friends has filled up with gunge.
- Slush/Ice Slush Mush/Fishy Avalanche (Ep1,11,12)- The chosen child has to endure 30 seconds of intense coldness as one of their friends pours ice and sometimes a fish down their back.
- Snot Hold (Ep2)- The chosen child holds gunge in their hands.
- Foot Paint (Ep2,4)- A teammate is selected to paint the chosen child's bare feet in an array of different colours.
- Sticky Beak (Ep3)- The chosen child has syrup, feathers and a beak put on them by a teammate.
- Teddy Trump (Ep3,13)- The chosen child has to hold a teddy which makes farting sounds.
- Maggot Foot Spa (Ep3)- Lots of maggots are poured onto the unfortunate child's bare feet by one of their teammates.
- Pink Poodle (Ep4)- The chosen child has pink artificial fur and syrup put onto their face in a challenge similar to “Sticky Beak.”
- Badger/Cat Sick Glove (Ep4,10)- A child is selected to wear gloves filled by one of their friends with slime.
- Dog Sick (Ep5)- The chosen child is forced to put their bare feet into wellington boots which they think is filled with dog sick and walk around in them.
- Sludgy/Sand Back (Ep5,8)- The chosen child has sand poured under their shirt by a teammate.
- Say What (Ep6,8,9,13)- The chosen child is forced to watch their teammate pick up funny speech bubbles such as “I lick frogs” or “My best friend is a maggot.”
- Hairy Scary Werewolf (Ep6)- The chosen child has artificial fur and syrup stuck onto their face in a challenge similar to “Sticky Beak.”
- Flower Pot Head (Ep6,9)- The child selected has a pot strapped to their head and a teammate pours soil and water into it.
- Clown Face (Ep7)- The chosen child has their face painted as a clown by a teammate.
- Flying Toilet Paper (Ep7,8,12)- A child is selected to wear a target around their neck and the teammates will be chucking wet toilet paper at them trying to hit the target.
- Maggot Hold (Ep9,11)- One child is chosen to hold maggots in their hands for a length of 30 seconds.
- Stinky Socks (Ep10)- A child is chosen to wear a gas mask with smelly socks fitted into it for 30 seconds.
- Squirty Santa (Ep13)- With the help of their friends a child is made to look like Santa with whipped cream and a Santa Claus hat.

==== Nora Nugget’s Class ====
- Feed A Friend (Ep1,2,13)- All four children are each given a large spoon in which they must feed each other custard from a single bowl whilst trying to be silent.
- Mushy Pea/Custard/Chocolate Salon (Ep1,5,8)- A child is selected to have their hair customised by teammate.
- Banana Split Head (Ep2)- The chosen child has a banana split made on their head by one of their friends.
- Pink Peach Smoothie (Ep3)- One child is chosen to drink a smoothie containing salmon paste & peach which is blended together by one of their friends.
- Splatapult Chocomash/Mushy Peas (Ep3,10)- A child is chosen to sit whilst one of their friends splats chocomash or mushy peas at them.
- No Hands Smoothie (Ep4)- The chosen child attempt to drink the whole smoothie whilst only using their mouth and not their hands.
- Curdy Jam Face (Ep4)- A sandwich made on the face of the chosen child.
- Horse Berry/Mushroom Curd Sandwich (Ep5,9)- The selected child would have to eat a strange combination of sandwich flavours whilst them and their friends must try to be silent.
- Silent Trump (Ep6,11)- The chosen child would have to eat baked beans whilst sitting on a whoopee cushion.
- Puppet Food (Ep6)- The chosen child has their wrists stringed up under the control of one of their friends whilst trying to eat food.
- Human Pizza (Ep7,11)- The chosen child has tomato purée, cheese, anchovies, herbs, sweetcorn and tuna poured onto their head by one of their friends.
- Cake Face (Ep8)- One child is selected to have cake's catapulted into their face by a teammate.
- Crispy Crickets (Ep8)- The chosen child is selected to eat crickets.
- Veggie Spread ‘Tache (Ep9)- The selected teammate is chosen to have their face smothered with veggie spread to resemble a moustache.
- Sprout Trifle/Gherkin Jelly (Ep10,12)- One of the chosen teammates friends puts their hands into a jug full of jelly and either gherkins or sprouts and the chosen teammate will have to eat it.
- Chin Sundae (Ep12)- The chosen child has melted chocolate and rice snaps put on their chin by a teammate.
- Doughnut Dip (Ep13)- The selected child is chosen to eat a doughnut whilst not using their hands and only their mouth.

==== Miss Bunsen’s Class ====
- Instant Snowman (Ep1,2)- The chosen child has artificial snowballs thrown at them whilst wearing a black felt shirt, a black bowler hat and a carrot nose.
- Turbo Take-Off/Fizzy Jet Pack/Scuba Pack (Ep1,3)- The chosen child has two cola bottles put on their back whilst one of their friends is tasked with dropping mints into each to make them explode over the poor child.
- Toxic Slugs/Catch A Cold/Rain Catcher (Ep2,10,13)- The chosen child has to wear boxing gloves whilst trying to catch water balloons which are being thrown at them by their friends.
- Invincible Glove (Ep3)- The chosen child is given a large stick which they are tasked with popping gloves with which are stuck onto the blackboard. Once popped each glove has golden confetti strips fall out.
- Sticky Hat (Ep4,12)- The chosen child has velcro balls thrown at them whilst wearing a hat which has velcro strips on it to try and get them to stick.
- Camouflage/Invisibility Suit (Ep4,5)- One child is chosen to wear a white hazmat suit which one of their friends is tasked with painting to make them try and blend in with the background.
- Human Laundry/Carwash (Ep5,7,11)- The chosen child has wax, whipped cream and water poured over them to resemble a carwash.
- Balancing Boot (Ep6)- The chosen child has to try and balance on one foot whilst wearing a boot and holding a tray full of beakers.
- Star Suit (Ep7,13)- The chosen child is tasked with wearing a suit with velcro strips all over it and made to stand in a star shape whilst their teammates throw velcro balls at them.
- Non Drop Gloves (Ep8)- The chosen child has objects thrown at them which are covered in gunge whilst trying to catch them whilst wearing golden washing up gloves.
- Fizzy Silent Disco (Ep8,9)- The chosen child is made to wear a wig, sunglasses and headphones blasting out music whilst shaking a bottle of cola which is then opened by them at the end of the challenge.
- Trapped Gas/Levitation/Human Airbag (Ep9,11,12)- The chosen child has a balloon placed under their shirt which one of their friends will pump up and eventually burst at the end of the challenge.
- Invisible Umbrella (Ep10)- The chosen child has weathers of all seasons (rain, snow, leaves falling etc.) being dropped on them by one of their friends.

=== Series 2 (2012) ===
==== Mr Gross’s Class ====
- Insect Boxes (Ep1,9,10,11,14,15)- Two children are chosen to place both of their hands into boxes which are then filled with insects including crickets, beetles, maggots and mealworms.
- Compost Ball Roulette (Ep2,3,7,12)- All the children take it in turns to spin a wheel which will land on one of the children's tie colour. The chosen child must then pick a compost ball and crack it onto their forehead. The fortunate one will have just flour and the unfortunate one will have gunge.
- Plumbing Task (Ep4,5,8,13,20)- All four children take part in this task whereby two of them sit across from each other and attempt to unblock pipes by blowing pipes that are filled with water whoever wins and successfully gets their teammate covered in water will go through to the final round in which the winning child will face whichever one of their teammates won the other game.The child who wins this round will win the game.
- Celebrity Trump Guess (Ep6,17,18)- In this game the children have to guess if the celebrity on the card will have a bigger fart compared to the previous celebrity.
- Babysitting (Ep8,13)- All four children have to be silent whilst baby dolls pee and make farting noises over them.
- Locker Matching Game (Ep16,19)- The children must try and match up the same surprise lockers with each other. Every locker has a range of different surprises including silly string, snow blizzard, red sauce and mustard sandwich, the cheeky monkey locker and the clown face wash locker.

==== Miss Adventure’s Class ====
- Pie Face- All four children take it in turns to choose a peg they hope doesn't have red paint on the bottom. If the peg does have red paint on it they will then get a pie in the face.
- Botumo- The children must compete against “Botumo” champion “Francois” where whilst back to back wearing ridiculous costumes must attempt to push him out of the ring, the first to step out of the ring loses.
- Animal Pen/Enclosure- The children must attempt to keep the fake dressed up animals from attacking each other whilst trying to remain silent.
- Camel Ride- The team must each take it in turns to ride a dressed up camel and try to hold on whilst remaining silent.
- Face Paint- In this task the children must each stick their heads into a board covered with a camouflage design and withstand gunge, paint & sawdust being thrown at them by Miss Adventure in an attempt to try and make them blend in with the surroundings.

==== Les Prance’s Class ====
- Splat The Balloons- The children must attempt to splat balloons which for the sake of the programme are called tomatoes with a tennis racket all whilst their friends are standing behind getting wet with the water from the balloons.
- Blink Game- The children must go against one another and attempt to not blink, the first to do so gets cold icy water tipped down their back using the pipes inserted into their shirt.
- Face Paint- Facing their backs to the child tasked with painting their face the contestants must attempt to try and remain silent whilst one of their friends attempts to make them look like a character from a film or stage show.
- Ballet Dog Shoes- The children are tasked with remaining silent while being forced to perform a dance routine whilst wearing ballet shoes with squeaky dog toys stuck to the bottom of them.
- Pigeon Poo- All four children take it in turns to pull a bell whilst they sit underneath it. Those unlucky will get pigeon poo on them, those lucky will receive feathers.

== Series overview ==
Series	Start date	End date	Episodes
1	14 September 2009	7 December 2009	13
2	19 March 2012	13 April 2012	20

== Episodes ==
Series 1 (2009)
Episode No.	Names	From	Graduated or Expelled
1.	Danika Bruce Luke Rory	Kent	Expelled
2.	Shammel Revana Tamera Nathan	East London / Hackney	Graduated
3.	Louise Scott Ross Shannon	Glasgow	Graduated
4.	Oliver Carl Leia Connor	Liverpool	Expelled
5.	Dennis Matthew Brandon Liam	Sunderland	Graduated
6.	Maria Kiyana Hannah Zainab	West London / Ealing	Graduated
7.	Taylor Aaron Charlotte Alice	Cardiff & Buckinghamshire	Graduated
8.	Elissa Gabby Cagdas Mahan	North London/Finchley	Expelled
9.	Sebastian Gregory Michael Fatima	Birmingham	Graduated
10.	Tsvey Kelsey Donni Megan	Brighton	Graduated
11.	Nicola Armani Rudi Mollie	Leeds	Expelled
12.	Callum Connor Saffron Con	Ipswich	Expelled
13.	RJ Kira Connor Lyndon	Bristol	Graduated

Series 2 (2012)
Episode No.	Names	From	Graduated or Expelled
1.	Harry Anna Abbie Cameron	Merseyside	Graduated
2.	Charlie Tamika Joshua Ellison	Birmingham	Expelled
3.	Mahmuda Jevon John Yousurf	Sunderland	Graduated
4.	Ty Ajit Muzzy Sharif	London	Graduated
5.	Amy Chloe Ellen Christiana	London / Bromley	Expelled
6.	Kavita Tariq Ricco Humza	Glasgow	Graduated
7.	Evan Caitlin Jay Ollie	Cardiff	Expelled
8.	Ross Jodie Josh Rachel	Glasgow & Edinburgh	Graduated
9.	Caylum Adam. N Husain Adam. L	Cardiff	Expelled
10.	Aran Anton Sunesh Hassan NOTE:Natacza Boon was off sick in this episode	London / Wandsworth	Expelled
11.	George Anna Sameer Rachel	London / Hackney	Expelled
12.	Jonathan Abi Jamie Chloe	Bristol & Cornwall	Graduated
13.	Oliver Marcie Callum Ashlea	Carlisle	Expelled
14.	Khadejah Jake Mohammed Kane	Manchester	Expelled
15.	Rory Ella Jamil Dania NOTE:Natacza Boon was off sick in this episode	Cardiff	Expelled
16.	Adam Salman Paris-Marie Upinder	Leeds	Graduated
17.	Iman Molly Saffi Nour	Manchester	Graduated
18.	Logan Callum Callie Lauren	Newcastle	Graduated
19.	Chloe Kian Emma Odhran	Belfast	Graduated
20.	Jessica Eva Omar Jake	Glasgow	Graduated
