= Bear Behaving Badly =

British children's television series

- Nev and Barney
- Starring: Barney Harwood; Ross Mullan; Glen Davies; Bella Emberg; Beverly Hills; Simon Buckley; Allyson Brown; Shyanne Sanders; Bradley Yates
- Voices of: Ross Mullan, Simon Buckley
- Narrated by: Barney Harwood
- Theme music composer: Richie Webb & Matt Katz
- Opening theme: 'Bear Behaving Badly' Theme by Barney Harwood
- Country of origin: United Kingdom
- Original language: English
- No. of series: 4
- No. of episodes: 78 (list of episodes)

Production
- Executive producers: Maddy Darrall; Billy Macqueen; Tanya Motie
- Producer: Fiona Robinson
- Production location: Teddington Studios (2009)
- Camera setup: Multiple-camera setup
- Running time: 20 to 21 minutes
- Production company: Darrall Macqueen Productions

Original release
- Network: CBBC, BBC One, BBC Two
- Release: 3 September 2007 – 21 December 2010

Bear Behaving Badly is a British children's sitcom produced by Darrall Macqueen Productions, which originally aired for four series and was broadcast on the CBBC channel from 3 September 2007 until 21 December 2010.

== Background ==
The programme is centred around the daily adventures of Barney Harwood, his pet bear Nev, his koala friend Crazy Keith and the caretaker of the trio's flat, Andy Prank. Nev and Barney originally appeared together on Sunday morning children's programme Smile which ended in 2007. The programme features the voices of Ross Mullan as Nev and Simon Buckley as Keith, with actress Bella Emberg playing the role of Aunt Barbara. A series of twenty-six episodes was commissioned by the BBC in March 2007, after a trailer for the proposed series being uploaded to YouTube received over 1 million hits. Following successful ratings, a second series of twenty-six episodes followed in December 2008. Both series were originally broadcast on BBC One, before being repeated in an early morning slot on BBC Two. In August 2009, a third series of thirteen episodes was filmed. These episodes began airing from 7 December 2009, this time on the CBBC Channel, before later being repeated on BBC One. In July 2010, a fourth series of thirteen episodes was filmed. These episodes began airing from 6 October 2010. The series concluded on 21 December 2010, and thus far, no further episodes have been filmed. Repeats continued to air until March 2016 on CBBC.

== Synopsis ==
The action of Bear Behaving Badly is centred on an apartment block owned by Barney's wealthy uncle Rupert Silverspoon. There are three flats on the ground floor. Barney and Nev live in Flat 1, Beatrice lives in Flat 2, and the caretaker, Mr Prank, lives in Flat 3. There are at least 5 more flats upstairs, one of which Aunt Barbara lives in. A door under the stairs leads down to the boiler room. Barney is a children's television presenter. This series is not set in a city or town. It is set in nowhere. He doesn't own a car and instead travels everywhere by tricycle or takes the bus. Barney and Beatrice share a mutual affection, though sometimes Barney is a bit shy when talking to her. Mr Prank has an obsequious attitude towards Barney whom he frequently addresses as "Mr Barney, Sir." This feigned respect is because Barney's uncle is his employer. In addition Prank runs his own ice cream business from his ice cream van which is often seen parked outside the apartment block. Aunt Barbara does not know about Mr Prank's ice cream and constantly refers to it as a 'rusty old thing' and demands the owner (Mr Prank) should be locked up. He is allergic to Nev's blue fur but pretends to like him when Barney is nearby. As soon as Barney is out of sight, Prank is nasty to Nev and makes his life a misery. Sometimes Nev retaliates by snarling, blowing a raspberry at him, or even kissing him on the nose, causing him to sneeze. Nev has a favorite cuddly toy which he calls his Snuggly Ducky Duck Duck. He also likes to have plastic ducks floating in the water when he has a bath. Despite starring in a programme called Bear Behaving Badly, Nev usually tries to do the right thing, and only misbehaves as a response to difficult circumstances or situations. He likes ice cream, jam, rubber ducks and socks.

== Characters ==
Character	Actor	Series	Notes
Barney Harwood	Himself	1-4	A television presenter for the BBC (playing himself). He is the owner of the flat where he, Nev and Crazy Keith live. He and Beatrice have an on-off romantic relationship. He seems oblivious to the chaos Nev and Keith cause and, although he thinks Mr Prank is odd, he has never realized that Nev, Keith, Melanie and Mr Prank are enemies. His aunts are Barbara and Alice, his uncles are Rupert and Bert, and his cousin is Melanie.
Neville the Bear Nev, Nevvie	Ross Mullan	1-4	A small, blue, bear who likes ice cream, socks, jam and his "snuggly ducky duck duck". He has patches in places and is missing part of his ear after it was bitten by Bandit (Mr Prank's cat). Nev has trouble pronouncing certain words and when scared or intimidated, he growls, like a real bear. He once had a sword fight with Mr Prank. He has stopped Mr Prank from losing his job and twice from going to jail. He appeared at a TV presenter alongside Barney before the series.
Crazy Keith	Simon Buckley	1-4	An illegal immigrant Koala from Brisbane who lives under the floor boards of Barney's flat with his inanimate girlfriend Doris, with whom he converses. He is Nev's best friend, but often ropes him into hare-brained schemes, usually with the intention of stealing Mr Prank's secret ice cream stash. His existence is known only to Nev, Beatrice and Barney. As shown in Curse of the Were-bear he is part were-bear. He can speak a prehistoric language as shown in Cave-bear and he has not had a bath for years. He mentioned 3 times that koalas are an endangered species and he's very greedy. He adores ice cream and pizza and often over-eats, meaning he becomes so fat he gets stuck. He has a brother called Dennis and an uncle called Bruce. In the episode Crazy Keith - Extreme Koala he was a surfing superstar in Bondi Beach where he met Doris. He has a friend called PC Stereotype. His catchphrase is "Oh, wackadoo!"
Beatrice	Allyson Brown	1-4	A college student and part-time ice cream van assistant, also known for her baking talent. She lives in the flat next to Mr Prank. Nev calls her "Beetroot". She and Barney have an on-off romantic relationship. She appears less in later series, only appearing in two episodes in series 3, and five in season 4. She is allergic to Daffodils and had once failed a college assignment.
Mr Andrew "Andy" Prank	Glen Davies	1-4	The caretaker of the block of flats that he Barney, Nev, Beatrice and Aunt Barbara live in. He also owns an ice cream van, which he tries to hide from Aunt Barbara, presumably because he is supposed to be attending to his caretaker duties. He is arch-enemies with Nev, to whom he is allergic. Nev, Keith and Melanie call him "(Mr) Angry Pants", a play on his name. As shown in The Strange Case of Mr Prank he may have German ancestry as Dr Gunter Von Prank had his surname. Although he would do anything to get rid of Nev, in Sing A Song of Secrets he loves Nev and would miss him. He once had a sword fight with Nev. He has a twin brother called Martin, and Crazy Keith mentioned he has a cousin called Benny who set his pants on fire. He has Scottish relatives called the McPranks, as seen in the episode "Sock Mess Monster". He used to be part of Boy Scouts and is the 33rd Putney Boys top animal tracker where he was called radar prank. He often mentions his mother or 'mumsie', whose picture he talks to.
Postie	Beverly Hills	1-4	The local postwoman, who has an on-off love relationship with Mr Prank. She is also best friends with Beatrice. She once nearly married Mr Prank, only to discover he was attempting to steal her lottery win money which was only a £5 voucher which Mr Prank gave to Aunt Barbara to replace the flowers he damaged. It is unknown what her real name is.
Aunt Barbara	Bella Emberg	2-4	Aunt Barbara is Barney's aunt, and Uncle Rupert's and Aunt Alice's sister. She dislikes Mr Prank, calling him "a useless caretaker", or a "caretaker, caretaker, couldn't-care-less-taker". She also has a sight problem, often referring to Nev as a dog and a hearing problem, calling Mr Prank Plank despite repeated corrections. She also has a crush on Bill Oddie. She is a minister of the High Church of the Convenient Coincidence as shown in ‘'Yummy Mummy'’. She almost married George the mummy in Yummy Mummy until she discovered him cheating on her with Mr Prank dressed up as a girl mummy. She frequently hits Mr Prank with her handbag, which is comically capacious, capable of carrying Chops (her pet) and many huge ornaments, paintings and kitchen utensils. She can also play Reveille on the trumpet. She is strong as she is capable with hurting Barney, lifting Mr Prank up and crashing down doors with or without Mr Prank in tow. She used to be a member of the Girl Guides and she always notices when Mr Prank or Melanie misbehave.
Melanie	Shyanne Sanders	2-4	Melanie is Aunt Barbara's niece and first cousins with Barney. Nev calls her "Smelanie". She often helps Nev and Crazy Keith carry out acts of revenge on Prank. She is a school pupil with a passion for sports. She is 10 in series 1 and 13 in series 4. She is often forced to wear Aunt Barbara's ugly dresses.
Uncle Rupert	Geoffrey Whitehead	1-4	Uncle Rupert is the owner of the block of flats in which Barney and Nev live. Barney has a picture of Rupert on the wall of his kitchen. Rupert has a stash of treasure which will be bequeathed to Barney when he dies.
Snuggly Ducky Duck Duck	Bradley Yates	1-4	Snuggly Ducky Duck Duck is Nev's soft toy duck who snuggles with Nev in his bed. Nev would do anything to save him if he got caught or stolen (except be nice to Mr Prank for the rest of his life).
Mr Cuddly Wuddly	A Stuffed Toy	1-4	Mr Cuddly Wuddly is like Snuggly Ducky Duck Duck but Mr Cuddly Wuddly is Barney's and looks a lot like Nev.
Bouncer Boy	Gregory Foreman	1	Bouncer Boy is Mr Prank's nephew. He is the original owner of Bandit, however, when he left the country with his mother to go travelling, Mr Prank ended up looking after him. Bouncer Boy only appeared in Series 1. He would often assist Mr Prank in his schemes.
Bandit	Gregory Foreman and sound FX	1-4	Bandit is a large, orange tabby cat, formerly owned by Bouncer Boy. He now resides with Mr Prank. He is responsible for the damage caused to Nev's ear as revealed in Operation Nev.
Doris	Stuffed Toy	2-4	Doris is a small pink and purple bunny rabbit, who is in a relationship with Crazy Keith. Doris originally resided in Australia with Keith. Although she is not, Keith likes to pretend she is real. Despite her muteness, she seems to be very persuasive, as Keith will often go great lengths to impress her. She is often told ironically by Keith "not to move a muscle".
Squealers	Sound FX	1	The Squealers are some of Keith's toy buddy's like Doris but did not appear when Doris was around as Keith either ditched them or they left, probably because Doris might be scared of them or there just wasn't enough space for them in Keith's tiny lair.
Chops	A dog and Sound FX	2-4	Chops is Aunt Barbara's dog which lives inside a handbag and came out of the handbag twice. The first time Chops came out of the handbag everybody loved him more than Nev so Nev got him in the handbag but Bandit was inside as well so Nev got Bandit out of the handbag. Then Nev came out with Chops and got congratulated.

== Transmissions ==
Series no.	Series premiere	Series finale	Episodes	Notes
1	3 September 2007	8 October 2007	26	—N/a
2	1 December 2008	16 January 2009	25	This series took a break between 20 December 2008 – 4 January 2009.
Comic relief special	10 March 2009		1	—N/a
3	7 December 2009	23 December 2009	13	—N/a
4	6 October 2010	21 December 2010	13	This series was aired weekly instead of daily apart from the last 2 episodes.

== 2016 Live UK tour ==
It was announced that Bear Behaving Badly would go on a UK tour in 2016. Glen Davies who played Mr Prank in the TV series would have been on the tour, Barney Harwood would have featured in the show by pre-recorded video link, and would not appear in person. There would have been 21 shows starting from Friday 18 March 2016 – 5 June 2016. The show had later been cancelled, due to low ticket sales.

=== Tour dates ===
Theatre	Start date	End date
BARKING The Broadway	Fri 18 March	
EASTBOURNE Royal Hippodrome	Sat 19 March	
SOUTHAMPTON Mayflower	20 March	
POOLE Lighthouse	Sat 26 March	
NORWICH Theatre Royal	Mon 28 March	
NORTHAMPTON Royal & Derngate	Tue 29 March	Wed 30 March
CREWE Lyceum	Thu 31 March	
SWANSEA Grand Theatre	1 April	
READING The Hexagon	Sat 2 April	Sun 3 April
DARTFORD Orchard Theatre	Mon 4 April	
GUILDFORD G Live	Tue 5 April	
HARROGATE International Centre	Wed 6 April	Thu 7 April
EDINBURGH King's Theatre	Fri 8 April	Sat 9 April
GLASGOW Pavilion	Sun 10 April	
EPSOM Playhouse	Sat 28 May	
HERTFORD Theatre	Sun 29 May	
CHESTERFIELD Pomegranate	Mon 30 May	
STEVENAGE Gordon Craig	31 May	
CLACTON Princes Theatre	Fri 3 June	
CHESHAM Elgiva	Sat 4 June	
PETERBOROUGH Key	Sun 5 June	

== Broadcast and home media ==
The series premiered on CBBC on 3 September 2007, and ended on 21 December 2010. After that, reruns continue to air on the channel until 2016, when the show was removed from CBBC.

A Bear Behaving Badly DVD titled Bunfight at the Ice-Cream Coral was released in 2008 and features episodes from the first series. It was released by HIT Entertainment.
