= Sophie Evans (magician) =

English magician (died 2025)

- Born: Portsmouth, England
- Died: May 2025
- Occupation: Magician

Sophie Evans (died May 2025) was an English magician who lived and worked mainly in Las Vegas. She worked regularly at the famous Hollywood Magic Castle, in the close-up room and the parlor, as well as onstage in the Palace. An international award-winning magician, she took the coveted Closeup Award in Australia in the mid-1990s, becoming the first woman ever to win an international award for close-up magic. She is best known in England for her work on the BBC's "Sorcerers Apprentice" magical TV series for children.

Evans came from an established English show-biz family that goes back 4 generations. Her great-great-grandmother was a Gaiety girl; her great-grandfather a music hall performer and her grandfather was well-known stuntman and technical director, Rupert Evans. Other family members include actress Monica Evans, who understudied Joan Littlewood in Rhinoceros and later became become a Pigeon Sister in "The Odd Couple" and is the voice of Maid Marian in the 1973 film Robin Hood.

She was a specialist in close-up and comedy magic, as well performing her burlesque-style magical-fire stage act. She has opened for "The Amazing Johnathan" in Vegas, and often works with International Magician Kevin James as part of the Award Winning "Twisted Cabaret". She also acted as a magic and fire consultant.

Evans died from cancer in late May 2025.
