= Xchange (TV series) =

- Created by: BBC
- Presented by: Abbie Eastwood; Ade Adepitan; Angellica Bell; Dave Chapman; Erica Harvey; Holly Willoughby; Jez Edwards; Joe Challands; Marsali Stewart; Michael "Abs" Absalom; Ortis Deley; Gemma Hunt; Rani Khanijau; Anna Kumble; Steve Wilson
- Country of origin: United Kingdom
- Original language: English
- No. of episodes: 2,012

Production
- Running time: 60 mins & 2 x 30 mins

Original release
- Network: BBC One (2000-01); BBC Two (2001-04); CBBC (2002-06)
- Release: 24 July 2000 – 31 March 2006

Xchange is a factual entertainment BBC game show for children. It was broadcast initially on BBC One and BBC Two and later the CBBC Channel. The programme was transmitted live from studio TC2 at BBC Television Centre.

== Broadcast ==
The first era of the programme came on 24 July 2000 when it was designed as a programme shown on BBC One and BBC Two in the summer and Easter holidays. This format was repeated annually until the launch of the CBBC Channel in 2002. As a result, 1,040 episodes over two years were initially ordered. At that time, it was the BBC's biggest ever single in-house commission. On the CBBC Channel, it was a continuous, daily, hour-long format broadcast from 7:30am. Although, by the time the programme ended in March 2006, it was being broadcast twice daily in thirty-minute durations.

The last edition of Xchange was broadcast on 31 March 2006 ending with Vinnie J Ferret's (the "J" initial was also revealed to be "Jebadiah") own version of classic song "My Way" as "Our Way" with a little vocal help from the presenters of the show and Westlea Primary School, particularly Alix Clifford. Michael "Abs" Absalom, Ade Adepitan, Ortis Deley, Jez Edwards, Gemma Hunt and puppet "Vinnie" the ferret (Dave Chapman) were the show's last presenters. The programme was replaced by Sam & Mark's Level Up.

== Format ==
The show featured a website where users can sign-up to collect points, and also could gain points for being a caller on the show. People who obtained 1000 points could enter a draw to appear on the show and be a "Gold X-IDer" in the studio. In a later series, the 1000 points could also be traded in to have a presenter host a part of the show from an X-IDer's house for a week.

Xchange featured celebrities, music performances, comedy and games. Featured celebrities included Girls Aloud, Daniel Bedingfield, Hilary Duff and Verbalicious. A weekly discussion point, branded sequentially as "The Big One"/"Backchat"/"Sticky Situations", was where viewers gave their thoughts and opinions on a topic. The "Xperts" item featured viewers who reviewed new movies, games, books and music. The "Dream On" strand endeavoured to make the dreams or ambitions of some of the programme's viewers come true.

=== Games ===
- Snot Me - two people go head to head picking hairs out of a gunge filled nose. The loser would get gunged if the trigger hair was pulled.
- Quiche Lorraine - An elderly lady 'Lorraine' walked across a field whilst quiche tarts were catapulted at her from a medieval trebuchet.
- Who's Bin Here? - A game played in the early episodes of the digital channel format, a bin was emptied of contents which alluded to a celebrity owner.
- Breakfast In Bed -

== Merchandise ==
In 2001, three books published by BBC Education Publishing under the Xchange banner went on sale: Head Strong, Microbe Makes and Team Spirit.

When children appeared on the show, the presenters of that show would sign a photo of themselves and personalise it to the child.

Also, the main game that would appear on the show would have the prize of an Xchange-branded alarm clock and a few more goodies were given away behind the scenes such as messenger bags, mousemats and keyrings.
