= Prank Patrol (Canadian TV series) =

Canadian children's television series (2005–2010)

- André Simoneau and the Ninjas
- Starring: Andy Simoneau
- Country of origin: Canada
- No. of seasons: 4
- No. of episodes: 100 (43 lost) (5 incomplete)

Production
- Running time: 25 minutes
- Production company: Apartment 11 Productions

Original release
- Network: YTV
- Release: September 6, 2005 – February 26, 2010

Prank Patrol is a Canadian children's television series that aired on YTV. Each episode, host André "Andy" Simoneau and a team of ninjas help kids pull off pranks on an unsuspecting victim, usually a friend or family member. With the help of experts, pranksters convince their victims that the events - such as the prankster possessing incredible super powers, alien landings, or an intelligent gorilla suddenly appearing - are real, until the process is revealed to the victims after a successful prank.

== Format ==
At the beginning of the show, Andy and the Ninjas are shown driving a van to the designated location where the victim is. After introducing themselves, Andy then throws the Prank Patrol logo on the screen and the episode starts. Each episode, the ninjas wreak havoc on an unsuspecting public with a different prank. The ninjas drive the van, conduct surveillance, and carry out pranks not only on the public, but also on the presenter or even Andy. One week a karaoke machine showers wanna-be singers and the next week a book of magic spells unleashes a spell on unsuspecting readers.

There is also a recurring animated short segment on the show called "Recipe for a Prank", which involves a little girl using various pranks on her older brother or vice versa. It teaches kids about how to use these pranks on their parents, siblings, or friends. The beginning of the segment usually shows the older brother picking on his little sister or the sister doing something to the brother, whereupon she or he comes up with a plan to get back at him or her. In the end, the little girl's or boy's prank is a success while the teenage boy or the little girl suffers the shame from the prank.

== Production ==
Prank Patrol is Produced by Apartment 11 Productions in Association with YTV (Canada). The first season consisted of 26 twenty-five-minute episodes and first aired in 2005. A second season was produced and aired in 2007 with twenty-six episodes. A third season was produced and aired in 2008 with again twenty-six episodes. The fourth, and final season was filmed in mid 2009 and first aired on October 2, 2009 with only twenty-two episodes.

== International versions ==
=== British series ===
There was also a British version, which was made by Baker Media for CBBC, and was presented by Barney Harwood. The design specialists were Lee Drinkwater, Stephen Dee and Darren Longthorne. The first series was shown as part of Saturday morning show TMi. The second series was shown on BBC One in early 2008. The Ninja in this version are played by Jennifer Cooper and Graeme Malcolm.

=== Australian series ===
When the new Digital Station ABC3 was released, Prank Patrol was one of the shows produced in Australia by the ABC. It is hosted by Scott Tweedie. The first series was so successful, the ABC renewed the show for a second series. Each episode of the Australian series is twenty-five minutes instead of thirty.
