= Nev the Bear =

Character

- Smile & Bear Behaving Badly character
- First appearance: 2002
- Created by: Darrall Macqueen Ltd
- Portrayed by: Ross Mullan
- Voiced by: Ross Mullan

In-universe information
- Alias: Neville
- Nickname: Nevvy
- Species: Bear
- Birth: 6 November

Nev the Bear is a small, blue puppet bear that originally appeared in the CBBC programme Smile on UK television and had his own show, Bear Behaving Badly, from 2007 to 2010.

== Appearances ==
Nev first appeared in the CBBC television programme Smile in 2002; his name was created from the name of his co-star Dev Griffin. From 2007 to 2010, he starred in his own CBBC show, Bear Behaving Badly, alongside Barney Harwood. He was last seen on Hacker Time, when Derek puts Nev on Line 1 for Barney Harwood.

Originally on Smile, the voice of Nev was prerecorded with his limited vocabulary being played in as appropriate. When Nev took on a more significant role, puppeteer Ross Mullan was recruited to provide the voice live; Mullan also voiced him in Bear Behaving Badly.

On 28 December 2007, Nev appeared on a puppet special of The Weakest Link hosted by Anne Robinson and broadcast on BBC One, but was eliminated in the fourth round of play.

== Character ==
Nev is a small blue bear. He has patches in places on his body and is missing part of his ear. This is due to Bandit the cat, who is seen in some episodes of Bear Behaving Badly, biting it off.

Nev likes ice cream, jam, socks and ducks (his favourite toy duck being Snuggly Ducky Duck Duck). When scared or intimidated, he growls, as a real bear would. In his post-elimination interview on The Weakest Link, it was hinted that he has a crush on both Soo and host Anne Robinson.

== Toys ==
A soft plush Nev was released in 2004, but was only available in a few stores.

A Talking Nev soft toy was later released. Pressing the toy's arm would cause its head and mouth to move and it would speak a randomly selected phrase from a tape of ten catchphrases recorded by Mullan, "Quick", "Excuse me", "Love you", "Fwightened", "Yum yum", "Jibadeeha", "Can't scare me", "Dunno", "Here I am" and "N-n-no". A customer complained in 2006 that she heard the toy speak profanities.

A smaller, beanie Nev soft toy has since been released, capable of saying only "Excuse me" and "Can't scare me!" when its tummy is pressed.
