= The Sorcerer's Apprentice (TV series) =

2007 British children's reality series

- Genre: Children's reality show
- Created by: George Kay; Ana de Moraes
- Presented by: Barney Harwood (2007); Ortis Deley (2009)
- Theme music composer: Daniel Pemberton
- Country of origin: United Kingdom
- Original language: English
- No. of series: 3
- No. of episodes: 30

Production
- Running time: 30 minutes (2007); 60 minutes (2009)
- Production company: Twenty Twenty

Original release
- Network: BBC One (2007); BBC Two (2009)
- Release: 9 July 2007 – 20 December 2009

The Sorcerer's Apprentice is a children's reality show that originally aired on BBC One with Barney Harwood as host for the first series from 9 to 20 July 2007. Children were taught magic tricks, which they would then perform for a panel of judges. It was moved to BBC Two with Ortis Deley as host for series two and three from 25 January to 20 December 2009.

== Transmissions ==
| Series | Start date | End date | Episodes |
|---|---|---|---|
| 1 | 9 July 2007 | 20 July 2007 | 10 |
| 2 | 25 January 2009 | 29 March 2009 | 10 |
| 3 | 18 October 2009 | 20 December 2009 | 10 |
