= The Totteridge Academy =

Location
- Barnet Lane; Totteridge; London, N20 8AZ; England; 51°38′22″N 0°11′55″W

Information
- Former name: Ravenscroft School
- Type: Academy
- Trust: United Learning
- Department for Education URN: 144502 Tables
- Ofsted: Reports
- Principal: Chris Fairbairn
- Staff: 30
- Gender: Mixed
- Age: 11 to 18
- Houses: Windsor, Churchill, Fleming, Hillary.
- Colour: Purple.
- Website: https://www.thetotteridgeacademy.org.uk

The Totteridge Academy is a mixed secondary school and sixth form located in Barnet, North London, England.

== History ==
=== Formation ===
Founded in 2016, The Totteridge Academy (also known as the TTA) is part of the United Learning academy trust.

The TTA site formerly housed The Ravenscroft School.

In June 2022, The Totteridge Academy was one of four British schools shortlisted for the World’s Best School Prizes, run by an organisation called T4 Education. However, the school was not selected as one of the finalists.

In June 2023, the school won the TES award for the 'best secondary school of the year'.
