= Smile (British TV series) =

- Presented by: Devin Griffin (2002–03); Fearne Cotton (2002–04); Reggie Yates (2002–04); Rochelle Wiseman (2004–06); Barney Harwood (2004–07); Kirsten O'Brien (2005–07)
- Country of origin: United Kingdom

Production
- Producer: Darrall Macqueen Ltd
- Running time: 2 hours, 30 minutes

Original release
- Network: BBC Two
- Release: 17 February 2002 – 26 August 2007

Smile was a British Sunday morning children's programme created by production company Darrall Macqueen for CBBC. It first aired on 17 February 2002 on the CBBC Channel. BBC Two joined CBBC in airing the series from 1 September 2002. The final programme was broadcast on 26 August 2007.

== History ==
In January 2002, Smile was commissioned for an initial 60-week run. Primarily a children's magazine programme featuring celebrity guests, the show also encouraged audience participation through competitions and games. It won an Indie Award for its interactivity, going on later to win two Children's BAFTAs.

A number of cartoons and other programme acquisitions were transmitted during Smile on a rotational basis. Principally these included Arthur, Batfink, BB3B, Even Stevens, Jakers! The Adventures of Piggley Winks, Legend of the Dragon, The Likeaballs and W.I.T.C.H.

When the show first aired in 2002, it was likened to Saturday morning TV on a Sunday, except without a studio audience. It had celebrity guests, interviews, performances, games and 'built in' CBBC shows and cartoons. It had a very different feel with Fearne, Reggie and DJ Devstar. Once they left, however, the show's style changed and was aimed at the younger end of the CBBC audience. As a result, the programme became more game oriented. To enable the show to evolve, further changes were made. In the revamp, Rochelle Wiseman was lost.

Between 2006 and 2007, Smile began to target the younger audience CBBC wanted to get, and with Barney and Kirsten as the two remaining presenters the show took on a battle of the sexes format. The celebrity guests and some items were dropped, although the cartoons remained, but the main significant change was that children were invited onto the set to take part.

== Presenters ==
The original presenters were Fearne Cotton, Reggie Yates and Devin Griffin (credited as DJ Devstar). In 2003, Devin left to concentrate on his radio career, and was replaced by Barney Harwood. Soon after, Fearne and Reggie left in 2004 and were replaced by Rochelle Wiseman, former S Club 8 singer and later a member of the girl group The Saturdays. In 2005 Kirsten O'Brien joined the team. On 26 March 2006, Rochelle Wiseman left the Smile team of presenters. Two of the presenters, Fearne Cotton and Rochelle Wiseman (now Rochelle Humes due to her marriage to JLS member Marvin Humes), both voiced the Voice Trumpets in another Darrall Macqueen show, Teletubbies.

Presenters	From	To
Devin Griffin "DJ Devstar"	2002	2003
Reggie Yates	2002	2004
Fearne Cotton	2002	2004
Barney Harwood	2004	2007
Rochelle Wiseman	2004	2006
Kirsten O'Brien	2005	2007

Guest Presenters
Stacey Cadman
Mohini Sule
Nigel Clarke
Glen Davies (as Andy Prank)

== Nev ==
The presenters have always been joined by a puppet known as Nev (Neville), who lives with Barney. Nev is a small, blue bear with patches in places and is missing part of his ear. Originally, the voice of Nev was prerecorded, and his limited vocabulary played in as appropriate, which was why the puppeteer Ross Mullan was recruited to provide the voice live. As a consequence, Nev's voice in the studio sounded distinctly different from that in the many phone-in games used on the programme.

Nev loves socks, jam, ducky, Barney and Kirsten, calling Kirsten "Krusty" (probably because he can't say "Kirsten"). The little bear often has trouble with pronunciation of certain words, he cannot sing but he can rap well. Nev likes dressing up and sleeping in, the former he usually gets to do during the programme, the latter he cannot do easily on Sundays because of the programme. His dislikes include baths and scary stories. When scared or intimidated, little Nev has been known to growl, just like a real bear would.

A 26 episode sitcom starring Barney and Nev, Bear Behaving Badly commenced transmission on BBC One and the CBBC Channel on 3 September 2007.

The series was brought back for a second lot of 26 episodes in late 2008. This aired at the daily slot of 17:45, with episode 13 being broadcast at 7:45.

The BBC then announced that they had recommissioned it for a third series due to air in early 2010. This was later moved to late 2009. This series aired at the same slot as series 2.

The fourth and final series aired in late 2010. This series aired weekly on a Wednesday with the last three episodes being broadcast on the Monday, Saturday and Sunday on the week following up to Christmas. The series lost a lot of ratings and it was not recommissioned. In early 2011 all series aired at the daily slot of 08:55 on the same channel. This continued until early 2014. After the February half term the show was moved to the later slot of 12:00. On 28 April the show was moved to a later slot of 12:10. On 14 July the show moved to the later slot of 13:20. The show quickly became more popular and the show was aired during these summer holiday 2014. After 8 September 2014 the time slot changed to 11:50. From 5 January 2015 the show then aired at 11:30. This continued until 5 February 2015. After the 2-week half term. The show did not return and was replaced by The Slammer.

Within time, Bear Behaving Badly became one of CBBC's most popular programmes.

=== Merchandise ===
In 2005, the Nev the Bear talking toy hit the shops. The toy said a number of catchphrases including "Fwightened" and "No no no no". A complaint was made against the toy manufacturer with regard to the word "Quick", by an individual who believed he had heard the toy saying "prick" - rude British slang for an annoying person - instead. A smaller version of the soft toy has since been released with a single catchphrase, "Excuse me! Can't Scare Me."

=== Nev's Quotes ===
- "Hello, Ian" (instead of "Halloween")
- "Love you, Barney"
- "Oh Dear, Oh Dear, Oh Dear!"
- "Ducky!"
- "Jam!"
- "Socks!"
- "No, no, no, no."
- "I win! I win!"
- "Oh, la, la."
- "Confused"
- "Fwightened."
- "Can't scare me" or "Can't bathe me."
- "Oops" or "Oh dear, oh dear, oh dear" or "Sorry, Barney"
- "Doggy"
- "Zibedeah"
- "Piggies"
- "BBBBBB!" (instead of "BB3B")
- "Rumble the crumble" (instead of "Rumble the Jumble")
- "No way Jose"
- "Yeah yeah!"
- "Yum yum!"
- "Snuggly Ducky Duck Duck" (the name of Nev's cuddly duck toy, shown in "Bear Behaving Badly")
- "Muma-Dabi-Dun" (Medallion)
- "double two! double two!" (when reading out the old Smile phone number)
- "Crazy Keith!"
- "Quick!"
- "'Thur" (instead of Arthur)

== Features and games ==
Throughout the duration of Smile, a number of games were featured, including Bandit Bites, Bath the Bear, Drop Da Beatz, Nev It Up, Nev's Pie Jarmies, Nev's Socks, Rap It Up and What Do You Fink. Many of the games are still available on various sites. The original Smile website one week before closure is archived.

=== Games Games Games ===
This was a series of games that pitted boys against girls, competing for a prize. The losing team had to get into Nev's bath of gunge. The Games were Bear Pairs, Duckey Bounce, Nev's Jam Buster, Bandit Bites and Quick On The Draw.

=== Rumble the Jumble ===
The object of the game was to write down any letters which appeared at the bottom right-hand corner of the screen. Once all the letters were collected, they formed an anagram of another word which participants need to decipher. The next stage was to draw a picture of or make something representing the word. Competition entrants then sent in their work into the programme.

=== Dressing Up ===
Around the beginning of the show, Nev dressed up. Viewers were asked send in pictures of themselves dressed up in the same way. Dressing up included the following themes: people (clowns, grannies, pirates, waiters and The Doctor from Doctor Who); animals (crabs, frogs, hedgehogs, owls); objects (garden gnomes, trains); food (Christmas puddings) and anything red for Comic Relief Red Nose Day.

=== Nev's Little Chefs ===
Every week on Smile, kids showed Nev how to cook, with recipes including Apple Smiles, Breakfast Feast, Banana Lollies, BlueBeary Muffins, French Bread Pizza Boat, Jelly Beary Sundae, Nev's Biscuits, Nev's Mush, Watermelon Lemonade and World Cup Biscuits.

=== Nev Sports ===
Sports and activities featured on the programme included basketball, climbing, cricket, karate and tennis.

== Digital ==
From 5 March 2006, digital viewers were able to press the red button to access an enhanced TV service called Smile Backstage which allows them to seamlessly switch between live action in the studio and behind-the scenes, using the left and right buttons on their TV remote control. Most of the action backstage is one of the presenters hanging out with Smile's special guests and doing additional challenges, playing games and chatting. Smile Backstage was the first time that an interactive TV stream-switching application had been used on a live broadcast at the BBC. Previously, viewers could also watch an extra seven minutes of programme content after the end of the main show. Smile won the Interactive Award at the Children's BAFTAs in November 2005.
