= Barney Harwood =

British actor and television presenter

- Born: Barnaby John Harwood; 7 November 1979 (age 46); Blackpool, Lancashire, England
- Occupations: Actor, television presenter
- Years active: 2002–present
- Television: Prank Patrol (2007–2010); Bear Behaving Badly (2007–2010); Blue Peter (2011–2017); CBBC (2002–2017)

Barnaby John Harwood (born 7 November 1979) is an English actor and television presenter. He is known for his work with CBBC beginning in 2002.

== Career ==
=== Television ===
For CBBC, Harwood presented Prank Patrol and was a voice-over commentator for The Smokehouse, while on BBC Two, he co-presented Basil's Swap Shop (a remake of Multi-Coloured Swap Shop), alongside Basil Brush.

Previous work for CBBC included gameshow Crush in 2004, Sport Relief Gets Sub'd!, a Sport Relief 2006 show and as co-presenter of Smile, which aired each Sunday on BBC Two until 26 August 2007 and saw him win a Children's BAFTA for best presenter. He also co-hosted the Doctor Who tie-in programme Totally Doctor Who until it was cancelled after series three in 2007. Harwood was also the Control Voice in an episode of the Doctor Who spin off animated series The Infinite Quest. As an extra, he appeared in the Doctor Who episode "Love & Monsters", which was first transmitted on 17 June 2006.

In July 2007, Harwood fronted The Sorcerer's Apprentice, a daily reality series following a group of children learning magic at a Harry Potter-style boarding school. Bear Behaving Badly, a 26-part sitcom starring Harwood and Nev the Bear from Smile, was broadcast on BBC One between September and October 2007. In February 2008, Harwood starred as the 'hidden' celebrity in an episode of Hider in the House.

Harwood's worked on the series Inside Life which is the children's companion series to the BBC Natural History Unit's Life. Harwood narrates all ten programmes.

On 13 December 2010 it was revealed on the BBC's Blue Peter that Harwood would be the new presenter on the show, taking over from Joel Defries.

Harwood had a successful career on the show becoming one of the longest serving presenters at 6.5 years. He soon became popular and renowned for his bad jokes and mischievous behaviour. Through the years he grew his famous catchphrase, "I want one", as well as growing to call over to "Camera Two" to get a shot of him and giving away strange prizes in the show's game "Spot Shelley", including a house in Spain, a unicorn called Colin and a life-times supply of chutney. His various hairstyles often added to his fame among viewers. Barney is particularly good at cycling, doing well in various challenges with bikes, a big fan of coffee, as well as music and has interests in photography and camping out in his campervan. He, however, has a fear of frogs; on his first show, Steve Backshall got him to hold one and on his last show he was made to kiss a frog, conquering fear in both.

In early 2016, Harwood took a break from Blue Peter; he returned later that year. It was announced in August 2017 during the show's summer break that Harwood would leave the show after six and half years and his final show aired on 14 September 2017 where Harwood would move on from Blue Peter and "onto new adventures". Harwood announced during his last Blue Peter episode that after 16 years working with CBBC, he would also leave the channel. On his last show he was awarded a Blue Peter Gold Badge, the highest accolade, for his work on the programme. When awarded by co-presenter Radzi Chingyanganya, he was described as being "at the very top of the list".

In August 2017, he appeared as a contestant on Celebrity Masterchef.

=== Filmography ===
| Year | Title | Role | Notes |
|---|---|---|---|
| 2002–05, 2007, 2014 | CBBC | Himself | Continuity Presenter |
| 2003-04 | Crush | Himself | Main Presenter (Series 1) |
| 2004-07 | Smile | Himself | One of the Presenters |
| 2006 | Sport Relief Get Sub'd | Himself | Main Presenter |
| 2006 | Totally Doctor Who | Himself | Main Presenter alongside Liz Barker |
| 2006 | Doctor Who | Man in the street | Guest Role, "Love & Monsters" episode |
| 2006 | Doctor Who: The Infinite Quest | Control | Voice |
| 2006-07, 2010 | Prank Patrol | Himself/Other Characters | Main Presenter/Actors (series 1) |
| 2007 | The Sorcerer's Apprentice | Himself | Main Presenter (series 1) |
| 2007 | The Sorcerer's Apprentice Extra | Himself | Main Presenter (series 1) |
| 2007-10 | Bear Behaving Badly | Himself | A Main Character |
| 2008-09 | Basil's Game Show | Himself | Narrator/Presenter for Series 1 |
| 2008-10 | Basil's Swap Shop | Himself | Alongside Basil Brush |
| 2008 | The Smokehouse | Himself | Narrator |
| 2008 | Hider in the House | Hider | Celebrity Guest Appearance |
| 2009 | Barney's Barrier Reef | Himself | Alongside Gemma Hunt |
| 2009 | Newsround Specials | Himself | Main Presenter alongside Sonali Shah |
| 2009 | Inside Life | Himself | Narrator of the series |
| 2009 | School of Silence | Himself | Presenter |
| 2009-10 | Bamzooki | Himself | Main presenter alongside Gemma Hunt |
| 2010 | Barney's Latin America | Himself | Alongside Gemma Hunt for series 1 |
| 2010-2012 | British Academy Children's Awards | Himself | Presenter |
| 2011 | Hotel Trubble | Himself | Guest star |
| 2011 | Hacker Time | Himself | Guest |
| 2011–2017 | Blue Peter | Himself | Presenter alongside Andy Akinwolere and Helen Skelton then Lindsey Russell and Radzi Chinyanganya |
| 2011–2012, 2016, 2018– | All Over the Place | Himself | Co-Presenter |
| 2017 | Celebrity Masterchef | Himself | Contestant |
| 2019 | CBBC Live Lessons | Himself | Presenter for S01E02 |

=== Radio ===
In addition to his television work, Harwood presented BBC Radio 4 children's magazine programme Go4It and co-presented Big Toe Books (previously The Big Toe Radio Show), for BBC 7.

=== Music ===
Harwood can play the guitar and piano and is also the keyboardist in The MüVs. As a singer/songwriter, he composed the theme music to Bear Behaving Badly and Prank Patrol.

=== Other appearances ===
In pantomime, Harwood played Idle Jack in Dick Whittington at The Anvil Theatre, Basingstoke, between November 2005 and January 2006.

From December 2007 to January 2008, Harwood appeared at The Assembly Hall Theatre, Tunbridge Wells as Buttons in Cinderella.

In April 2008, Harwood appeared in a musical version of Beauty and the Beast, as Jangles the court jester, at the Central Theatre in Chatham, Kent.

From December 2008 to January 2009, Harwood starred in Peter Pan at the Pavilion Theatre in Bournemouth. From December 2009 to January 2010, he again starred in Peter Pan, this time at the Grande Theatre in Blackpool.

On 1 and 2 August 2009, Harwood and Gemma Hunt presented a BBC Proms concert at the Royal Albert Hall in London, entitled EVOLUTION! A Darwin-Inspired Extravaganza for Kids (Prom21 and Prom23), during which they interviewed special guest Sir David Attenborough.

On 14 November 2009, Harwood made a guest appearance on CBBC series TMi, alongside Little Boots.

In 2010, Harwood appeared at the Lichfield Garrick Theatre for their Christmas production of Peter Pan, playing the lead role and co-starring with his father, comedian Barnaby.

From 2 December 2011 to 8 January 2012, Harwood played Muddles in Snow White and the Seven Dwarfs at the Churchill Theatre in Bromley.

In December 2013, Harwood played "Peter Pan" at the Theatre Royal in Nottingham, alongside David Hasselhoff and Su Pollard.

From 9 December 2016 to 8 January 2017, Harwood played the title role in Aladdin at the Grand Theatre in Blackpool.

From 4 December 2018 to 6 January 2019, Harwood played the Huntsman in Snow White at the New Theatre Royal in Lincoln.
