= Quiznation =

Quiznation may refer to:

- Quiznation (British game show) (2003–2007), a British quiz channel owned and operated by Optimistic Entertainment
- quiznation (American game show) (2007), a live interactive game show on GSN
