= Jeff Thisted =

American game show host (born 1968)

Jeffrey "Jeff" Thisted (born October 10, 1968 in Brunswick, Maine) is an American television presenter, game show host and Car-Guy. He's currently on the Discovery Channel show Rods 'N Wheels wrenching on hot rods. He's served as one of the hosts on GSN's interactive game show Quiznation in the PlayMania Block. He made his hosting debut presiding over one game on the May 18, 2007 episode of Quiznation and finished in October before the finale. He was the only male host on the PlayMania Block. Before it was cancelled, he also served as host on 100 Winners.

Thisted was also a Production Coordinator on The Price Is Right. He is notable for proposing to former girlfriend Rebecca Pribonic on-air.
