= The Fighting Cocks =

Music venue in Kingston upon Thames, London

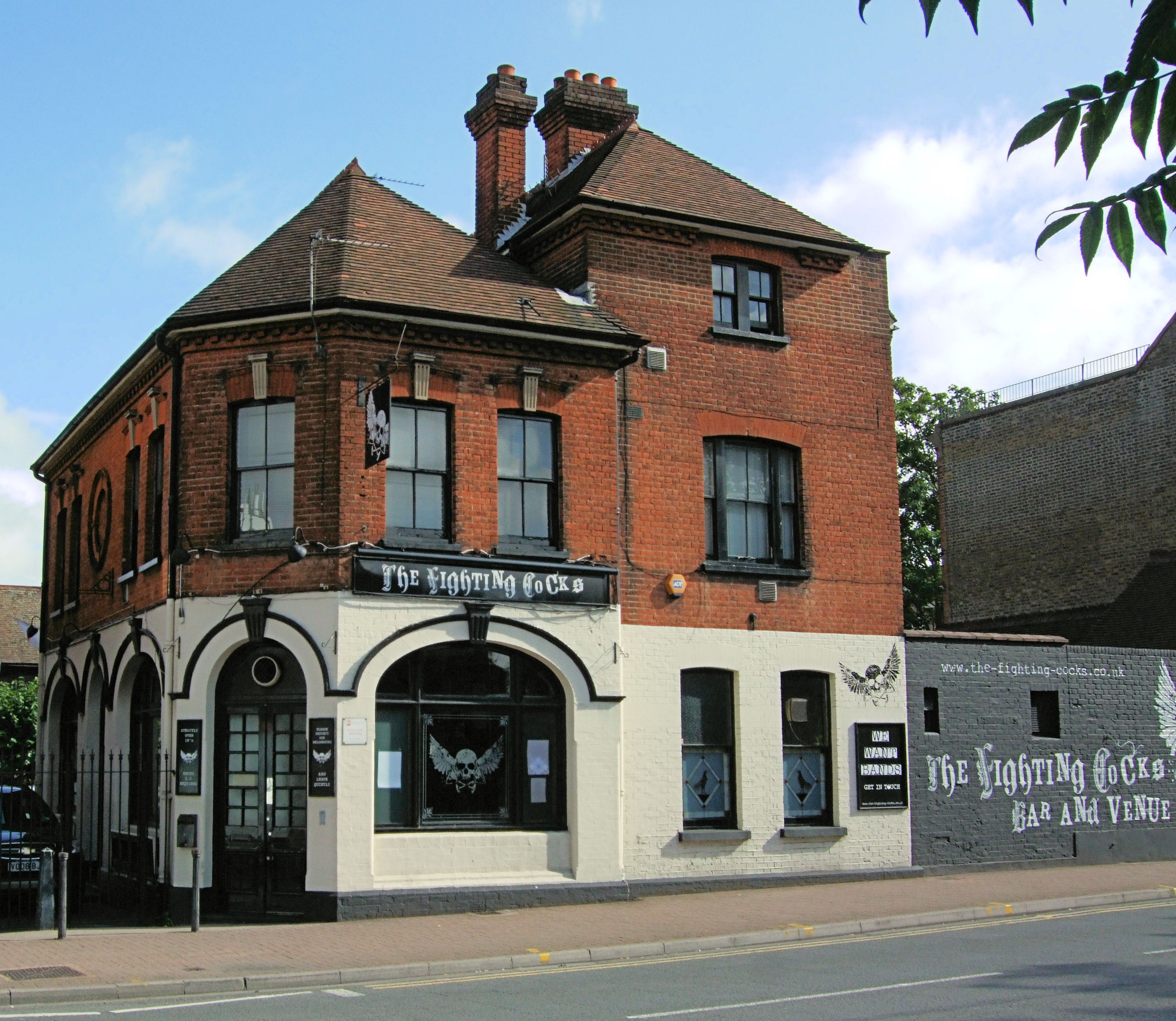
- The venue in 2016
- Interactive map of The Fighting Cocks
- Address: 57 Old London Rd; Kingston upon Thames; England
- Coordinates: 51.4103°N 0.2995°W
- Type: Music hall
- Production: rock and roll, punk, metal, ska, alternative, rockabilly, electro, comedy and cabaret performances
- Public transit: Kingston railway station – Travel Card Zone 6

Construction
- Built: 1891
- Years active: 1930 – present

Website
- TheFightingCocks.co.uk

The Fighting Cocks is a music venue built prior to 1890 active since the 1930s and located in Kingston upon Thames, the administrative centre of the Royal Borough of Kingston, southwest London, England. It specializes in rock and roll, punk, metal, folk, ska, alternative, rockabilly, electro, comedy, and cabaret performances. It was conspicuous for hosting touring jazz acts in the late 1930s and in the 1940s. It is now a standard on the London live circuit. It was a popular watering hole, and host to many jam sessions including such artists as Eric Clapton, Shirley Collins, Frank Turner, Gallows, The Stupids, June Tabor and The Rolling Stones. Since 1992, it is also a live-audience training platform and term assessments venue for Kingston University's drama and music students.

== History ==
Unsigned, underground, as well as established artists have been invited to perform. The last management of the Cocks opened its doors in 2000. The Fighting Cocks is cooperating with Banquet Records promoters based a few minutes walk away in the town centre, formerly part of the Beggars Banquet Records retail chain. Banquet Records is also home to Gravity DIP music management.

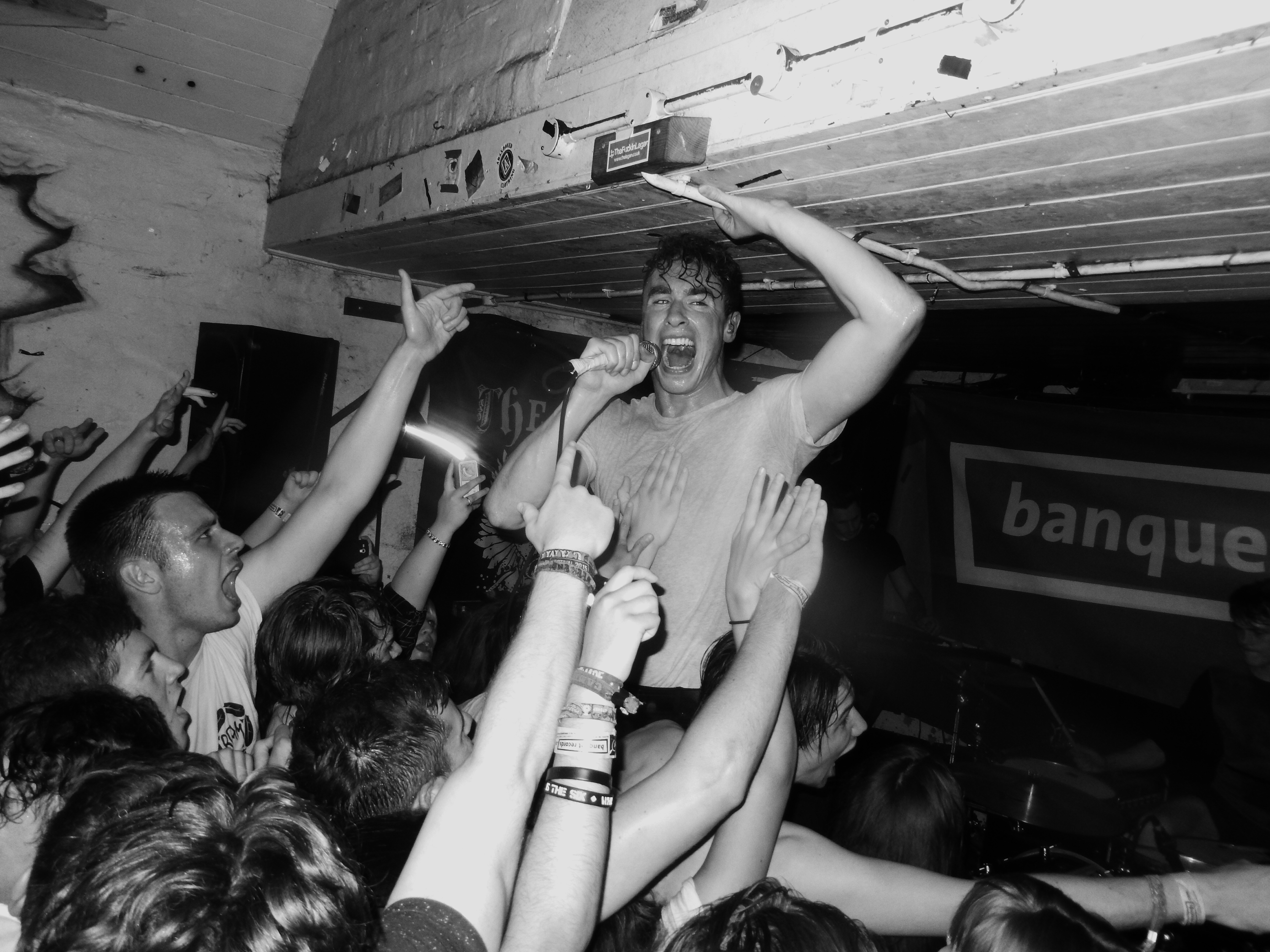
Don Broco

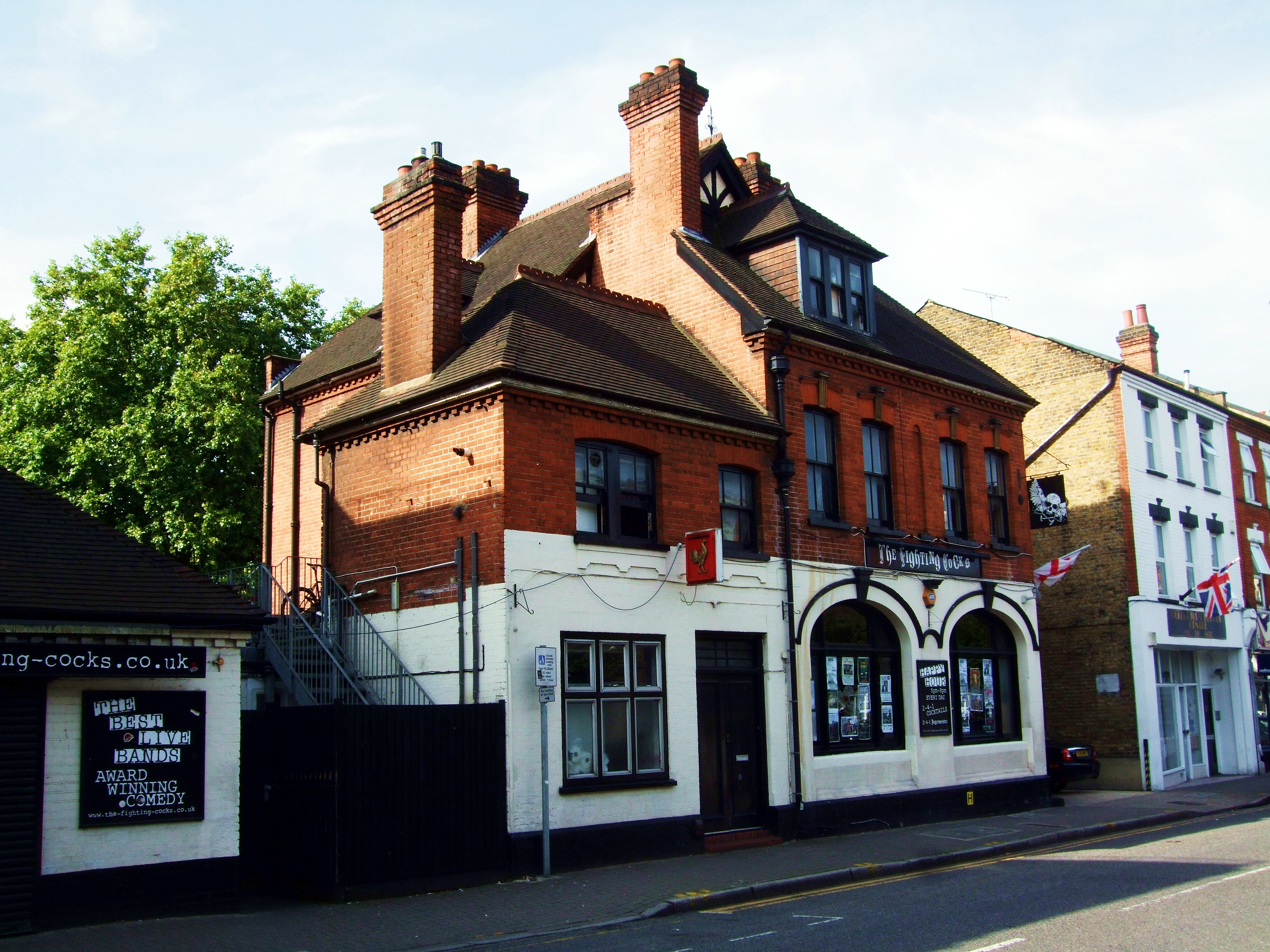

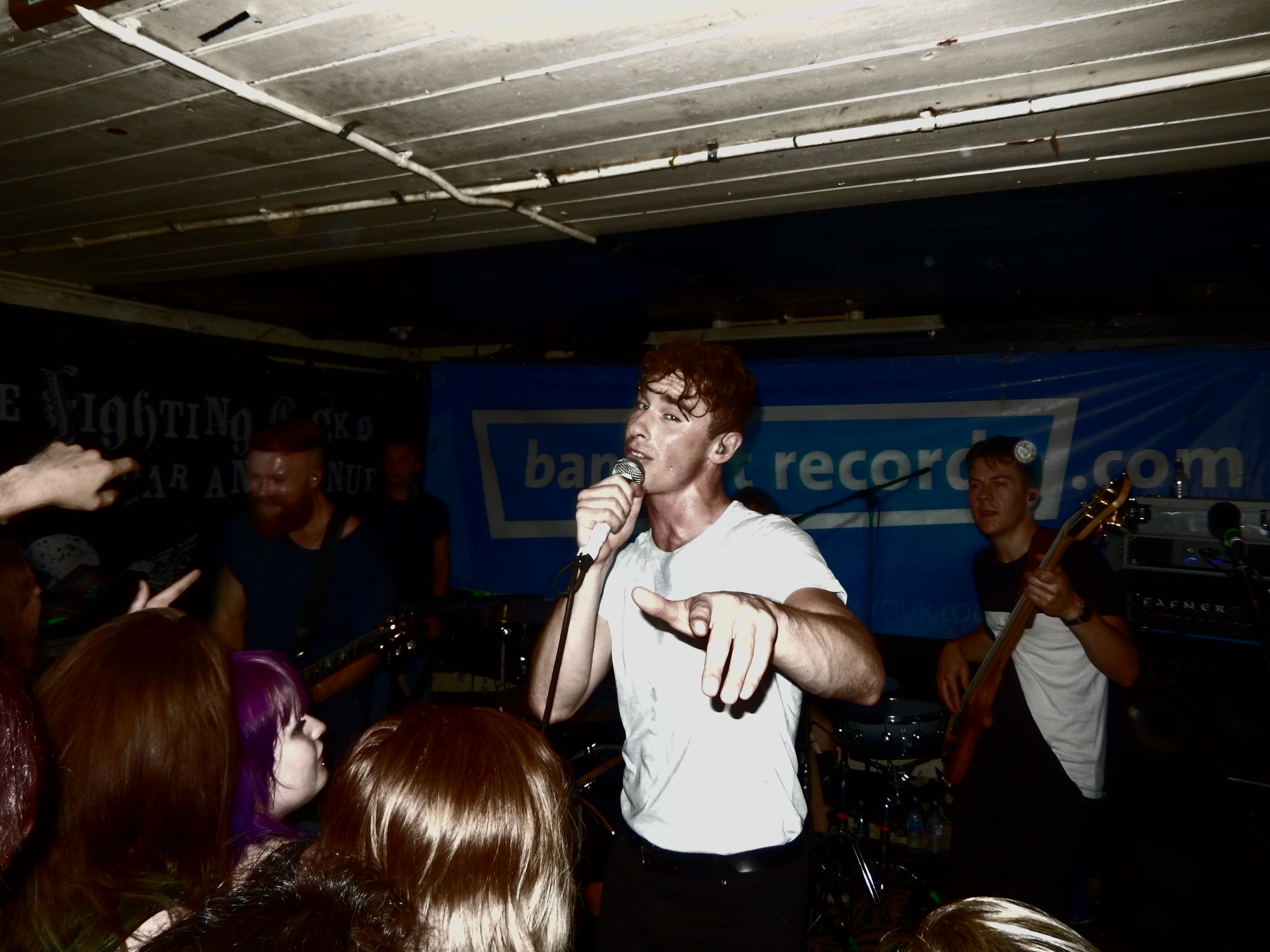
Don Broco

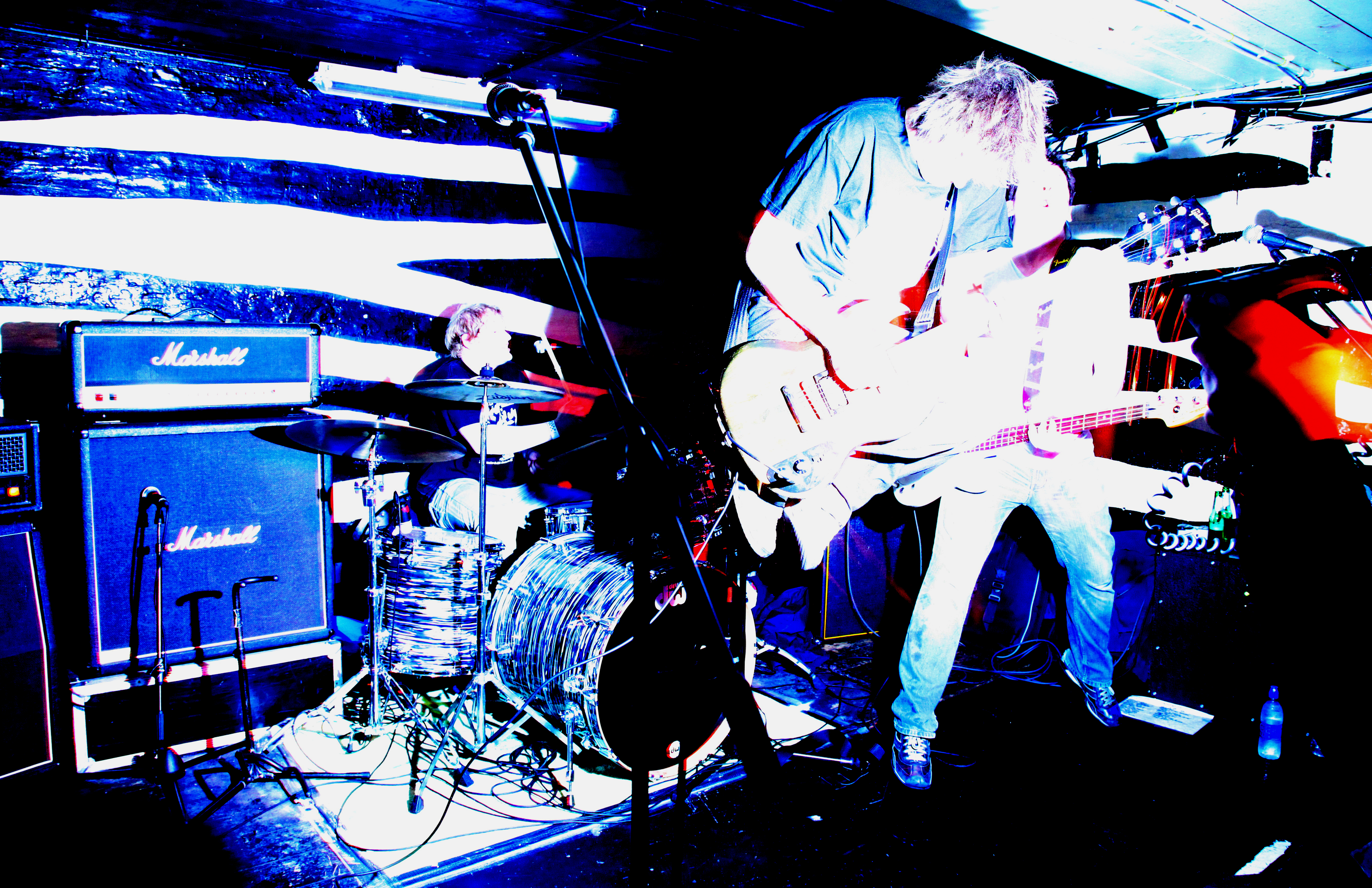
The Stupids in 2009.

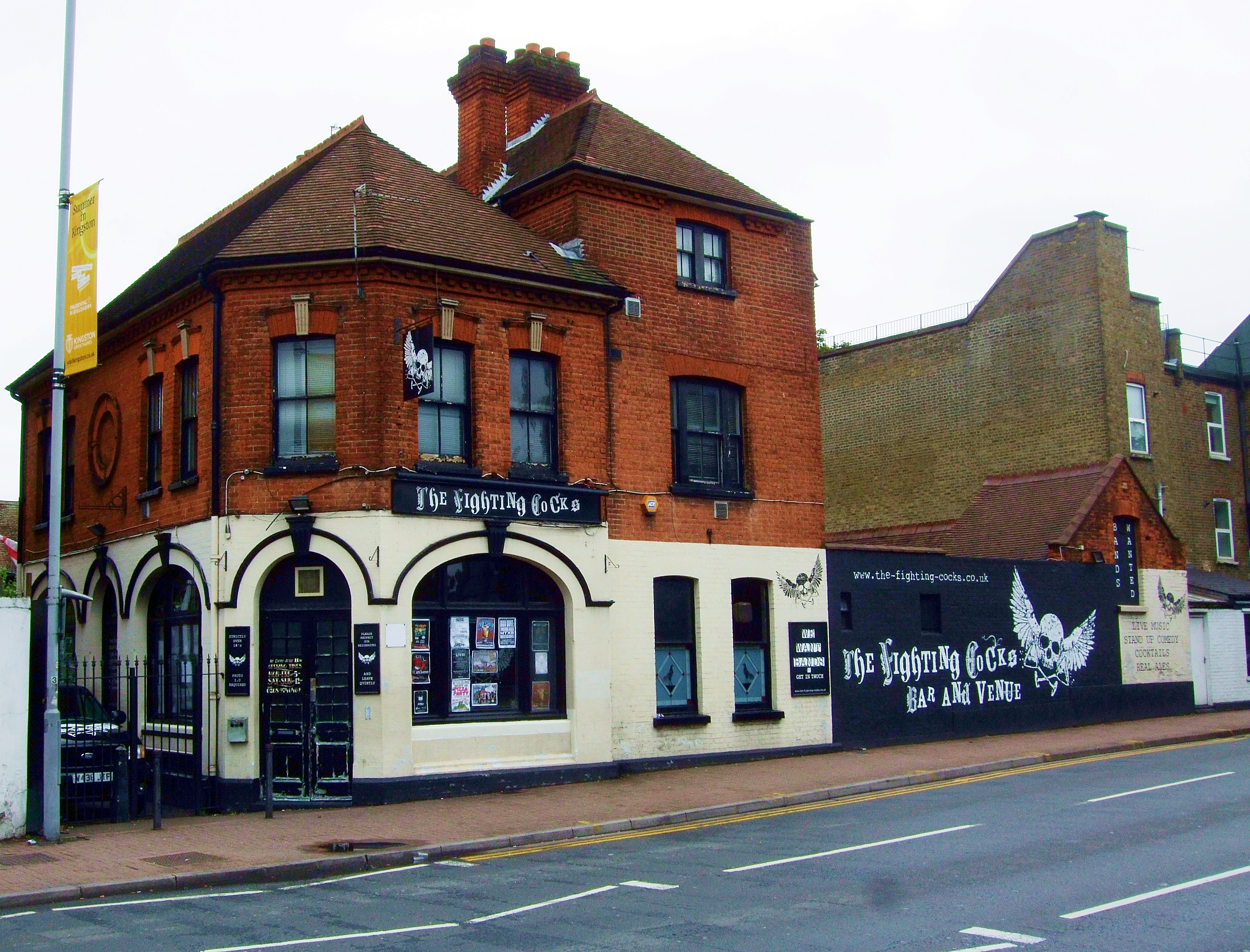

== Comedy performers ==
The music venue has a long history of comedy performers especially since it has transformed into the award-winning Outside the Box comedy night on Mondays. Comedians who have performed there include:

- Robin Williams
- Jo Brand
- Lenny Henry
- Tim Vine
- Lee Mack
- Frank Skinner
- Angela Barnes
- Al Murray
- Jack Dee
- Stephen Merchant
- Bill Bailey
- Jimmy Carr
- Dara Ó Briain
- Mickey Flanagan.
- Reginald D Hunter

Comedy couple Lucy Beaumont and Jon Richardson first met one another at the Kingston venue's weekly comedy night.

== Music performers ==
Past performers include:

| Performers | Country | Performers | Country |
|---|---|---|---|
| Andrew Koji Shiraki | : United States | Polar | : Norway |
| Crossfaith | : Japan | The Peacocks | : Switzerland |
| Cancer Bats | : Canada | Fucked Up | : Canada |
| Gay for Johnny Depp | : United States | New Found Glory | : United States |
| The Stupids | : England | The Flatliners | : Canada |
| Frank Turner | : England | Hundred Reasons | : England |
| Lower Than Atlantis | : England | Rolo Tomassi | : England |
| Voodoo Glow Skulls | : United States | Marmozets | : England |
| Guttermouth | : United States | Johnny Foreigner | : England |
| Gnarwolves | : England | Lonely The Brave | : England |
| The Menzingers | : United States | The Skints | : England |
| Against Me! | : United States | Every Time I Die | : United States |
| Polar Bear Club | : United States | Strung Out | : United States |
| The Unseen | : United States | Municipal Waste | : United States |
| Teenage Bottlerocket | : United States | Star Fucking Hipsters | : United States |
| Four Year Strong | : United States | Knuckle Puck | : United States |
| Cerebral Ballzy | : United States | Walter Schreifels | : United States |
| H20 | : United States | Letlive | : United States |
| Terror | : United States | Madball | : United States |
| The Blackout | : Wales | Time Again | : United States |
| Anti-Flag | : United States | The Hard Ons | : Australia |
| Hot Club De Paris | : England | Gallows | : England |
| Get Cape. Wear Cape. Fly | : England | The King Blues | : England |
| Jim Jones and The Righteous Mind | : England | Young Guns | : England |
| Drenge | : England | The Wedding Present | : England |
| Blood Red Shoes | : England | Blitz Kids | : England |
| Capdown | : England | Sonic Boom Six | : England |
| Wargasm | : England | Therapy? | Northern Ireland |

== The Fighting Cocks on film ==
The Fighting Cocks was featured as a filming location in Season 2 of Disney's Loki television series. In it, Hiddleston’s Loki catches up with his old star-crossed lover Sylvie (Sophia Di Martino) to discuss a return to the Time Variance Agency. Regulars might be perplexed by the décor: the pub is actually standing in for a watering hole in 1980s Oklahoma – though the leopard print and pool table will ring some definite bells. The pub has put a plaque down to mark where the God of Mischief once propped up the bar and sipped a bourbon.
