= Jessica York =

American television personality and sports anchor

Jessica York (born 1976) is an American television personality, and sports anchor. She currently works as a studio host and entertainment reporter for DISH Network. She was one of the three hosts on GSN's PlayMania before it broke off into two separate shows, and was subsequently a host on quiznation. York hosted her first episode of PlayMania on October 19, 2006. She continued to host until February 2007, when the program was split into separate programs, quiznation and 100 Winners. She served as host on both programs until 100 Winners was canceled in June and quiznation was canceled in October.

York is a graduate of Fort Lewis College in Durango, Colorado. After she graduated, York hosted a morning show, "Summit Sunrise" for the Resort Sports Network (RSN). She then moved on to host two shows for the RSN, Hot Spots, where she showcased locations around the world and their unique features and Thrill Seekers, a program featuring adventurous and extreme sports. She has been nominated for a regional Emmy Award for her work on Hot Spots, as well. These experiences qualified her to be the travel tip expert on Rachael Ray's self-titled talk show.

York has also been a weather forecaster for WMTW-TV in Portland, Maine and host of New Spaces on HGTV for two seasons. After moving from Maine to Los Angeles, York was a host on the TVG Network, serving as a studio host, studio analyst and track-side reporter for the horse racing network. York is also a certified personal trainer. She has released one home video, Body to Go.
