= Lisa Forbes (beauty queen) =

American beauty queen

- Born: Lisa Marie Forbes; May 5, 1981 (age 45); Olathe, Kansas, U.S.
- Height: 1.78 m (5 ft 10 in)
- Beauty pageant titleholder
- Title: Miss Kansas USA 2004; Miss Earth United States 2007
- Hair color: Brown
- Eye color: Blue
- Major competitions: Miss Kansas USA 2004 (Winner); Miss USA 2004 (Unplaced); Miss Earth USA 2007 (Winner); Miss Earth 2007 (Unplaced)

Lisa Marie Forbes (born May 5, 1981) is an American tv host and beauty pageant titleholder who competed at Miss USA 2004 and Miss Earth 2007.

== Biography ==
=== Pageants ===
Forbes was crowned Miss Kansas USA 2004 on November 30, 2003, in Wichita, Kansas. She competed in the pageant for five consecutive years, winning the interview award three times. She was a semi-finalist in 2003 and 2002, third runner-up in 2001 and a non-finalist in 2000. She then represented the "Sunflower State" at the Miss USA 2004 pageant in Los Angeles, California on April 12, 2004, televised live on NBC. Her successor as Miss Kansas USA was Rachel Saunders.

On August 1, 2007 Forbes won the United States Miss Earth title and represented the United States at the Miss Earth 2007 pageant, the third consecutive former Miss USA State titleholder to do so. At Miss Earth 2007 in Philippines, she was the first former Miss USA delegate to be unplaced.

=== Education and employment ===
Forbes was born in Olathe, Kansas and moved to Overland Park at age five. After graduating from Blue Valley Northwest High School, she attended the University of Kansas where she obtained a Bachelor of Arts degree in Communication Studies. In 2004, Forbes said she planned to pursue a career in either public relations or marketing, and claimed her dream job would be on television as a television host.

Forbes is passionate about the American Quarter Horse, which she grew up riding, showing and training. In October 2000, she represented the Northeast Kansas Quarter Horse Association in the All American Quarter Horse Congress Queen's Contest in Columbus, Ohio.

In 2006 Forbes appeared on the Paris edition of reality television show The Bachelor, but was eliminated in the first round. She was working as an IT recruiter at the time.

She and Ashley Litton (Miss Missouri USA 2004) own a pageant shop in Shawnee, Kansas.

Preceded by Amanda Pennekamp	Miss Earth United States; 2007	Succeeded by Jana Murrell
Preceded by Alicia Cabrera	Miss Kansas USA; 2004	Succeeded by Rachel Saunders
