= Bob Goen =

American television personality

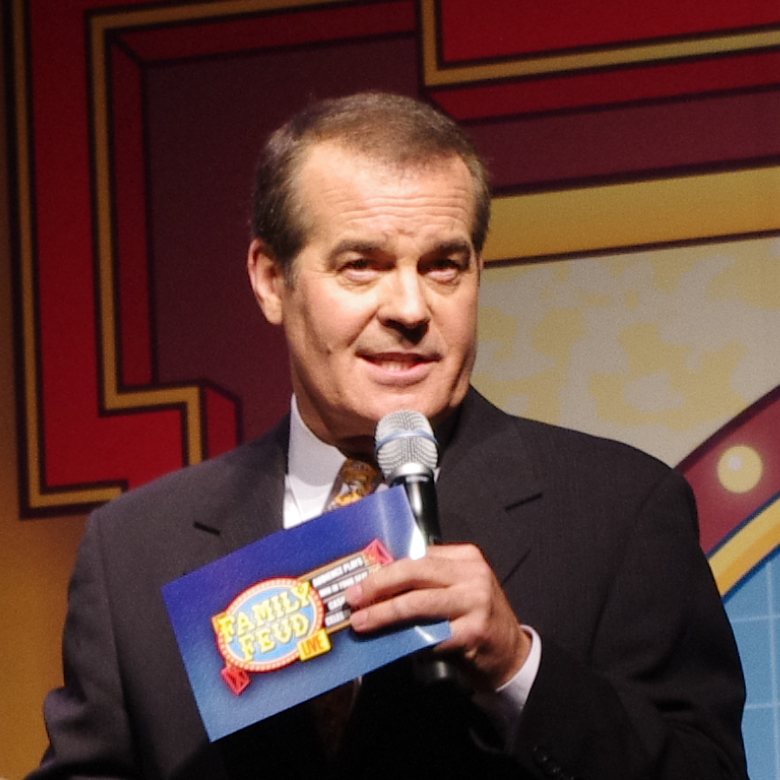
- Goen hosting Family Feud Live at the Pacific National Exhibition in Vancouver, British Columbia in 2012
- Born: Robert Kuehl Goen; December 1, 1954 (age 71); Long Beach, California, U.S.
- Occupations: Game show host; television personality
- Years active: 1977–present
- Spouses: Sabrina Goen (m. 1988–1997) Marianne Curan (m. 2004)
- Children: 1

Robert Kuehl Goen (born December 1, 1954) is an American game show emcee and television personality, best known for his work on Entertainment Tonight between 1993 and 2004 and as the fourth and final host of the daytime Wheel of Fortune from 1989 to 1991.

== Early life and career ==
Goen was born in Long Beach, California, but was raised in the Los Angeles suburb of Lakewood. In a 2009 interview at the Game Show Awards Red Carpet, he stated when he was 5, he always dreamed of becoming a game show host, with the encouragement of Bob Barker, Bill Cullen, Bob Eubanks, Tom Kennedy, Geoff Edwards, Wink Martindale, Monty Hall, among many others, and his dream came true as a young adult. Goen graduated from Lakewood High School in 1972, and from San Diego State University in 1976 with a degree in telecommunications and film. In 1977, he used his college radio experience to land a part-time job at KFOX radio in his native Long Beach, which led to his first full-time job as a disc jockey/producer for KPRO in Riverside, where he was promoted to work as a director. In 1981, he came to television, becoming a sports anchor at KESQ-TV, the ABC affiliate in Palm Springs.

== Career ==
In the early 1980s he served as ESPN's desert-area correspondent. After almost four years in that role, he came to Hollywood, where he has hosted several game shows, including Perfect Match (syndicated, 1986), Home Shopping Game with co-host Bob Circosta (syndicated, 1987), Blackout (CBS, 1988), The Hollywood Game (CBS, 1992), Born Lucky (Lifetime Television, 1992) and That's the Question (GSN, 2006–2007), which was based on a format from the Netherlands. His greatest success in this area came as the final host of the daytime network version of Wheel of Fortune (CBS, 1989–1991; NBC, 1991) and is currently the host of Wheel of Fortune Live!.

He had a small role in the opening of the 1988 series premiere episode of Freddy's Nightmares: A Nightmare On Elm Street: The Series, "No More Mr. Nice Guy", as a nightly news anchorman and on-scene reporter at the Springwood Municipal Courthouse for the pre-trial hearing of accused mass-murderer Fred Krueger.

He served as host for the Name That Tune video game released for the Philips CD-i in 1993.

He also hosted several Miss Universe pageants in 1994 (Manila, Philippines), 1995 (Windhoek, Namibia), and 1996 (Las Vegas, Nevada).

Goen also hosts the annual AKC National Championship, broadcast on Animal Planet and other channels owned by Discovery Communications.

Goen was co-host of GSN Radio with Marianne Curan, his wife. The show debuted on August 18, 2008, and aired its last episode on November 13, 2009. He and Curan moved to Cincinnati, Ohio in 2012 to work at Warm 98.

Goen has hosted live traveling versions of Family Feud and The Price Is Right. In 2012, he hosted The Price is Right LIVE in Branson, MO.

Goen has hosted a locally produced version of Let's Ask America called Let's Ask Cincinnati for Scripps' WCPO-TV in Cincinnati, Ohio featuring local Cincinnati celebrities and personalities playing for local charities in 2014.

== Entertainment Tonight ==
On April 12, 1993, he joined Entertainment Tonight as a substitute anchor and a reporter. When John Tesh left ET on May 30, 1996, to pursue his music career, Goen was promoted to nightly anchor alongside Mary Hart.

Between 1994 and 1996, he hosted the worldwide telecasts of Miss Universe, Miss USA and Miss Teen USA Pageants, all for CBS, replacing Dick Clark.

As ET host, he made guest appearances on two separate movies in 1999. On September 11, 2001, he covered the attacks on the World Trade Center. In 2003, he interviewed Suzanne Somers about the death of actor John Ritter.

In April 2005, Goen voiced a cartoon version of himself on an episode The Fairly OddParents. Goen, playing a character named Bob Glimmer, appeared with Mary Hart (whose character was named "Fairy Hart") as anchors of a show named Fairytainment Tonight. Goen also appeared as an interviewee on a 1997 episode of the cartoon mock-talk show Space Ghost Coast to Coast.

== Personal life ==
In August 2004, after 11 years of serving as ET anchor, he left to spend more time with his new wife and to pursue other projects. Mark Steines succeeded him.

Goen was married to Sabrina in 1988, and in 1994, had a son, Max. Max is the host of "The GoenLive Podcast." The couple divorced in 1997. In 2004, he married fellow television personality Marianne Curan.

In his spare time, Goen does annual charity work for his golfing tournament, The Bob Goen Lexus Invitational, which benefits the Make-A-Wish Foundation.
