= Ashley Litton =

American model (born 1983)

- Born: Ashley Renee Litton; July 29, 1983 (age 43); Columbia, Missouri, U.S.
- Beauty pageant titleholder
- Title: Miss Missouri USA 2004

Ashley Renee Litton is an American model and beauty pageant titleholder who held the Miss Missouri USA 2004.

== Miss Kansas Teen USA ==
Litton grew up in Olathe, Kansas and started competing in pageants in that state. She went unplaced in the Miss Kansas Teen USA 2001 pageant and was a semi-finalist in 2002.

== Miss Missouri USA ==
After graduating from Olathe South High School in 2001, Litton studied Fashion Design and Product Development at Stephens College in Columbia, Missouri.

Litton competed in the 2003 Miss Missouri USA pageant and was a semi-finalist. She was also a semi-finalist in 2004, when Shandi Finnessey of Florissant was crowned.

On April 12, 2004, Finnessey won the title of Miss USA 2004. The organizers of Miss Missouri USA decided to crown another queen to replace Finnessey and reign for the rest of the year. Litton was selected as the new Miss Missouri USA 2004. She reigned from April until December 2004, when the 2005 Miss Missouri USA pageant took place.

Because she never had the opportunity to compete in the Miss USA pageant, Litton was eligible to compete for the Miss Missouri USA title after she passed on the crown in 2005. She competed for the title in 2006, and placed first runner-up to Kristi Capel of Springfield. She also made the semi-finals in the 2007 competition won by Amber Seyer of Oran.

== Life after Miss Missouri USA ==
Litton operates a pageant boutique named Crown Chic in Shawnee, Kansas with fellow titleholder Lisa Forbes, Miss Kansas USA 2004.

She also appeared on MTV's Made as a coach on May 11, 2009.

Awards and achievements
Preceded by Shandi Finnessey	Miss Missouri USA; 2004	Succeeded by Andrea Ciliberti
