= Maff Brown =

British comedian and MC

- Born: 23 August 1974 (age 51); Laleham, Surrey, England
- Website: http://www.maffbrown.com

Maff Brown (born 23 August 1974 in Laleham, Surrey) is a British comedian and MC. He is known for his mischievous style of joke-telling. Brown is the founder of the award-winning Outside The Box Comedy Club.

== Football ==
During his high school education, he began playing football, a passion which was recognised as a talent when he was chosen to play right back and central midfielder for Brentford and Hamilton Academical. At 20 years old his playing career was cut short when a broken ankle failed to heal correctly. He went on to coach at the Centre of Excellence at Brentford, the Bolton Wanderers Academy and the Everton Academy. After graduating from Liverpool John Moores University, he was hired by Gerrard Houllier's team at Liverpool as a match analyst. After leaving Liverpool he was offered a coaching position in Singapore for Woodlands Wellington

== Stand-up comedy ==
In May 2005 he completed the Amused Moose standup comedy course run by fellow comedian Logan Murray, then began performing in November 2005. The day after he finished the course, Brown started plans to set up the now cult weekly Outside the Box Comedy Club at the Fighting Cocks pub in Kingston. Three months after the club began, it won the prestigious Best Comedy Club Award from comedy website Chortle. The club is popular with a large number of comedians, many of whom use the club to try out new material and most popularly, to test out their material pre-Edinburgh festival. To date guests have included: Jimmy Carr, Frank Skinner, Stephen Merchant, Bill Bailey, Lee Mack, Sean Lock, Russell Brand, Rich Hall, Omid Djalili, Dara Ó Briain, Andy Parsons, Jo Brand, Robin Ince, Tim Vine, Russell Kane, Rhys Darby, Russell Howard, Lenny Henry and most notably Robin Williams.

Aside from MCing Outside The Box every Monday, Brown tours the UK comedy circuit developing his own material. March 2007 saw him tackle the comedy clubs in New York City. After landing three open spots, he took on Village Lantern in Greenwich Village and on to the Broadway Comedy Club with its three rooms. On the first night he was in the smallest one and was only supposed to do five minutes, but the MC told him to stay on. He did over 15 minutes and on the strength of that, got invited back the next day to play the next room up. The middle room at the Broadway Comedy Club holds around 80 people. Brown did 25 minutes and got a standing ovation.

Brown has had numerous gigs in London's Comedy Store, most popular were the charity fundraiser gigs for Macmillan Cancer Support. These have been held on each September after his return from the Edinburgh festival. 2007 saw a successful gig with Brown hosting and the bill including Dara Ó Briain, Russell Howard and was headlined by Al Murray. 2008 was a total sell out with The Independent heralding the evening as "A triumph!".

=== Television ===
On 4 December 2020, he appeared on Mock the Week as a late replacement for Angela Barnes, who was ill. He usually performs as a warmup act for the audience before the show is recorded.

== Edinburgh Festival ==
August 2007 saw a successful Edinburgh festival stint for Brown when playing the white half in a show called The Honky and the Wog. Sharing the bill as the black counterpart, was Paramount Comedy Channel's Nathan Caton. They both performed half an hour and received positive reviews as a result.

2008's Festival was spent in the Pleasance Cellar as part of the award-winning stand up show AAA. Paddy Lennox, Tom Craine and Maff shared the night and each showcased half an hour of their best material. It was a sell-out for the whole of the August run which, for the first time in the show's history, sold out every night.

2009's Edinburgh festival saw Maff perform over three shows. Simon Donald and Maff Brown, a shared hour with Simon Donald co-founder of VIZ magazine. Half an hour alongside Simon Jenkins in the show Simon Jenkins Plus One. And as Philberto's show off brother Umberto in comedian Milo McCabe's show Philberto's Animal .

2010 saw Maff do his debut solo show Looking After Lesal in the Pleasance

In 2011 he returned to Edinburgh performing his second solo show entitled Pacman Is Actually Allergic To Ghosts and played the host character Buddy Brown in Milo McCabe's character led spoof chat show Get Brown!

2012 saw his first sketch show outing as part of "Maff Brown's Parade of This".

== Awards ==
- Chortle Awards 2006 – Winner: Best Comedy Club
- Chortle Awards 2007 – Nominee: Best Comedy Club

== Videography ==
- You Do The Maff (2008) Pilot episode with Stephen Merchant
- FSW with Maff Brown (2011) FSW – Episode 3
