= Milo McCabe =

British comedian, actor, presenter (born 1976)

Michael Patrick "Milo" McCabe (born 5 June 1976) is a British television presenter, actor and stand-up character comedian, best known for his work as the character "Troy Hawke".

== Early life ==
McCabe was born in Kingston upon Thames to Mike McCabe and attended Tiffin School. His father was a comedian of New Faces fame and appeared on The Comedians.

== Career ==
Milo McCabe has a BA (Hons) degree in Psychotherapy from the University of Liverpool and studied towards an MSc in Transactional Analysis. McCabe also studied Meisner Technique Acting at Impulse Theatre Company where he met Tim Booth. McCabe became a drummer for Tim Booth and the Individuals and in 2004 played Glastonbury Festival, T in the Park, V Festival and Benicassim (Festival Internacional de Benicàssim) alongside Morrissey, The Killers and The Strokes.

McCabe has presented ITV2's Dare and presented 3 episodes of ITV1's The Mint, then moved on to present its spin-off show Mint Extra on ITV Play from 9 September 2006. He has further presenting credits on Current TV.

Other shows McCabe has been involved with include The A-Z of Sexual Fetishes for Five, Rob Brydon's Annually Retentive for BBC Three and Live at the Electric for BBC Three.

McCabe regularly performs around the UK and internationally on the stand-up scene.

In 2011, McCabe performed his Edinburgh Fringe Festival chat show, Get Brown at the Gilded Balloon, Edinburgh, featuring 3 new characters, Nobbo Johnson, an Aussie Rules legend turned art critic; Tyson Moon, following in his "Father's Footsteps" as the son of an old school comedian and Anthony Sixsmith, a camp Liverpudlian bongo healer; alongside Maff Brown as the show's vitriolic host and Will Sentance as Floor Manager. Long standing McCabe creation Philberto also features as the unappreciated warm up guy. His show received 4* reviews.

In 2018, McCabe performed a sell out run of his show '1001 Moments with Troy Hawke' then brought the show to the 2019 Perth Fringe World Festival, where it won a weekly comedy award and was shortlisted for the best comedy main award.

In 2020, McCabe started his own internet call in show (Troy Tawke), this ran for several episodes during the COVID-19 pandemic's earlier lockdown weeks, finishing as lockdown restrictions were eased.

== Television work ==
- The A-Z of Sexual Fetishes (Five) – 2005
- Quiznation – 2006. Presenter
- Rob Brydon's Annually Retentive (BBC Three) – 2006
- The Mint (ITV2) – 2006
- Live at the Electric (BBC Three) – 2011
- Blue Go Mad in Ibiza (ITV2) – January 2015. Character: Juan (Spanish police officer)
- Benidorm (ITV1) – 15 February 2016. Character: Spanish police officer
- Live at the Apollo (BBC One) – 2023. Special Guest (as Troy Hawke)
