= Marianne Curan =

American actress

- Born: May 12, 1961 (age 65); Bowie, Maryland
- Other name: Marianne Curan Goen
- Education: University of Maryland, College Park
- Occupations: Actress, television personality, Comedian
- Years active: 1990–present
- Spouse: Bob Goen (m. 2004)
- Website: http://www.mariannecuran.com/

Marianne Curan (born May 12, 1961) is an American actress, television personality and comedian. She most recently hosted GSN Radio with husband Bob Goen.

== Career ==
In the mid-1990s, she hosted some of the first live interactive game shows on Game Show Network, including Super Decades, Trivia Track, Prime Games and When Did That Happen?. Curan was a guest host on Live with Regis and Kathie Lee and, when Kathie Lee Gifford left the program in 2000 Curan was considered for the permanent co-host role that Kelly Ripa ultimately claimed. Later in its run, she hosted PAX TV's live daytime talk show Great Day America with Food Network personality Marc Summers. In 2002, Curan hosted Landscapers' Challenge for Home & Garden Television. She hosted interstitial segments with Jordan Murphy for USA Network's Before & After'noon Movies in 2003.

Curan is also an accomplished celebrity impersonator. Her imitations of political figures Hillary Clinton and Sarah Palin gained her recurring roles in sketches on The Tonight Show with Jay Leno in the late 2000s. Her most prominent imitation is that of Martha Stewart, garnering her roles on The Tonight Show, as well as the 2006 film National Lampoon's Totally Baked: A Potumentary and Frank Caliendo's sketch comedy program Frank TV.

Curan has worked with The Groundlings and was part in the Washington, D.C.-area political comedy troupe Gross National Product for years. With friends Wendy Kamenoff and Lori Alan, she created and starred in The Hungry and Horny Show, which ran in Los Angeles in the spring and summer of 2007. Curan has had bit parts in episodes of the television programs Big Love and Malcolm in the Middle.

From August 2008 to November 2009, she co-hosted GSN Radio with Bob Goen, a live, four-hour interactive internet radio game show on GSN.com.

In December 2010, Curan starred in the one-woman show "A Kodachrome Christmas," written and directed by Seinfeld writing alum Pat Hazell. "A Kodachrome Christmas" played for three weeks in Austin, Texas at the Long Center for the Performing Arts and at Notre Dame University's DeBartolo Center.

Her writing has been published in "More" magazine online.

== Personal life ==
Curan married fellow television personality Bob Goen on March 20, 2004.
