= Quiznation (American game show) =

quiznation
- Fun to watch, better to play!
- Directed by: Jason Challinor; Trey Evans
- Presented by: Shandi Finnessey; Jessica York; Mel Peachey (Feb. - Apr. 2007); Angelle Tymon (Apr. 2007 - Oct. 2007); Jeff Thisted (May 2007 - Oct. 2007)
- Country of origin: United States
- No. of episodes: 143

Production
- Executive producer: Simon Willis
- Producers: Oyama Caviness; Andrew Collins; Johnny Mansbach; Adam Mitchenall
- Camera setup: Multi-camera
- Running time: 2 hours (including commercials)

Original release
- Network: GSN
- Release: February 23 – October 31, 2007

Related
- PlayMania; 100 Winners

quiznation was a live interactive game show on GSN. The official host was Shandi Finnessey, with Angelle Tymon, Jessica York, Jeff Thisted (and Mel Peachey before April) filling in. Featured in the two-hour program were interactive games where the viewers could win cash prizes.

The show aired from 12 midnight - 2 a.m. Eastern every Wednesday night through Saturday night (technically early Thursday through early Sunday morning in the Eastern Time zone). The program was nearly identical to the original PlayMania.

== Format ==
On quiznation, the contestants were home viewers. American residents 18 or older could enter the contest by text messaging a request or using the network's website. Potential contestants may enter up to ten (twenty in the final month) times per phone number on each show.

After a few moments, a contestant is notified whether or not their entry is chosen (at random) to proceed to another random selection process. If an entry is selected in the second phase, the contestant will be called on his or her home or mobile phone, depending on the method of entry. The contestant will then come on-air and be given a chance to play if the game lasts long enough. After a game is completed, the queue is cleared and a new entry is required. GSN charges a $.99 fee for each text message entry, in addition to standard text messaging rates charged by the wireless provider. Entries on the website are free. Regardless of the method of entry, each entry has an equal chance of being selected. An entry does not necessarily guarantee an opportunity to appear on the show. Residents of certain states may be ineligible to play various entry methods.

== Programming history ==
On February 20, 2007, PlayMania, the original GSN interactive game show, broke off into two separate programs, quiznation and 100 Winners. Collectively, the programs are known as the PlayMania Block.

On March 10, Jessica York filled in for Finnessey, who was preparing to compete on ABC's Dancing with the Stars. The next week, the spot was filled in by Mel Peachey, host of 100 Winners, on March 17 and 18. Finnessey was eliminated from Dancing on April 3. She hosted every Friday during her tenure on the show.

The April 1 episode began as if 100 Winners was airing live with Shandi Finnessey, who had never appeared on 100 Winners, hosting. The first two "contestants" were asked questions "What show are you watching right now?" and "What is my name?", poking fun at the general ease of the answers on 100 Winners. Each "won" a $1,000 prize. The third question, "What day is today?", was answered by someone who said "April Fool's Day!". The program then cut to that night's episode of quiznation, hosted by Peachey. The May 1 episode marked Finnessey's first time actually hosting 100 Winners.

All three hosts appeared on the April 6 show, which marked the one-year anniversary of PlayMania. April 7 was Mel Peachey's "goodbye show", as she left the PlayMania Block to return home to England. On the April 21 show, after a week of eliminations, Angelle Tymon was introduced as the new host on the PlayMania Block. Tymon hosted the second hour, taking over from York, with her solo debut coming the following night. She serves as back-up host to Finnessey.

A schedule change began May 6. A Sunday edition of 100 Winners aired in place of the previously scheduled quiznation. In its place, Thursdays will now feature an episode of quiznation. The May 18 edition featured the first appearance of The Price Is Right contestant coordinator Jeff Thisted as a new host.

By June 14, 2007, all scheduled airings of 100 Winners had been replaced with quiznation. The show has been indefinitely canceled from the programming schedule, as it is no longer referenced in the official rules of the PlayMania Block. Also in the month of June, Optimistic Entertainment, the co-producer of PlayMania Block, went into administration.

On July 17, 2007, the Tuesday editions of quiznation were removed. The removal was to accommodate encore showings of Without Prejudice?. After September 2, 2007, the Sunday broadcast was removed as well, slightly over a year after it originally debuted.

The record for the most money given away on quiznation is $4,700. It was won on September 5, 2007 by a caller named Teresa.

quiznation aired its last episode, hosted by Jessica York, on October 31, 2007.

== Games ==
quiznation featured various minigames that were played throughout the program; many are carry-overs from the original PlayMania. The rewards for the games were usually cash prizes ranging from $100 – $1,000 in cash, sometimes reaching up to, and over $2,000. There are a few methods quiznation employed to speed up a game or increase incentives for a game:

- Hints may be given by the host or the graphics operator to viewers
- Multiple guesses may be allowed
- The host could also increase the prize amount as an incentive, or alternatively, a certain number of callers set by the host will be playing for extra incentives.
- A "speed round", a period of time where callers are taken more quickly than usual, may be exercised.
- To provide a sixth answer to the polling games, the host sometimes utilized the "play-along pad" (a whiteboard) to record their personal answer to the game. The person who guesses that answer generally receives $50 – $75 in addition to any prize they may win in the main game.

These games were commonly played in rotation on quiznation.

Game	Instructions
Alphabuck$	Like the games of Hangman and Wheel of Fortune, this game allows players to attempt to guess a letter that is in the puzzle of a given category. If the player has letters in the puzzle, he/she will earn a small cash prize per letter. If any of their letters is in the puzzle, he/she has an opportunity to guess the puzzle and a correct guess wins an additional, larger cash prize.
Anagram	A word, name or phrase with the letters mixed up will be given related to a specified category. The contestant must identify what the unscrambled phrase is.
Category Game	Three items or names, all on ends of a triangle, are listed. The contestant must identify what all of the items have in common in the most specific manner.
Chain Link	Similar to Chain Reaction, a three-word word chain is given with the middle word not given. The contestant must give the appropriate middle word.
Crossword	Similar to a crossword puzzle, Crosswords features four horizontal words with one letter in each word replaced with a question mark. Vertically, the letters behind the question marks make an actual word. The contestant must identify (and spell) the hidden word. The portion needed to be filled in may appear to be multiple words; however, the host has an envelope containing the chosen word.
Faces	A famous couple will have their images mixed, creating an odd picture. The caller must identify one member of the pairing.
Missing Link	Three words will be given which have a common word preceding (or succeeding) it to make a common word or phrase. The player must complete the phrases.
Movie Quotes/T.V. Quotes/Ad Slogans	Three quotes, each from a famous American film, television program or advertising campaign are listed, each with a cash prize beside it. The contestant must guess which quote they are attempting for and where they think it comes from.
Picture Puzzle	A rebus based on a popular, everyday phrase is given. (e.g., MEREPEAT would be "repeat after me", because the word "repeat" comes after the word "me.") The caller must identify what the "decoded" phrase is.
Pixel	A pixelated photograph of a celebrity is shown. The contestant must identify who the celebrity is.
Song Titles	Three titles of pop music songs are given. The contestant must select one of the songs and identify the band or artist who made it famous.
Sound It Out	A mondegreen is given that is either a title of a movie, TV program, book or song. The contestant must figure out the real phrase.
Things You Find...	The quiznation crew picks three items one would commonly find in a designated location. The contestant must identify one of the items that would be found.
Top 5	Similar to Family Feud, a category is given that was surveyed to Los Angeles residents and GSN.com users. (e.g., "Top 5 Actors With a Last Name Beginning with 'S'") The top five answers to the survey are hidden, and it is the contestant's job to reveal one of them. Once all of the answers have been revealed, the game ends. A variation on a Top 5 is the quiznation 5. The difference is that the quiznation crew picks the five things on the list.
Vanity Plate	In the same vein as Bumper Stumpers, a vanity license plate is shown and a clue is given to whom it would belong. The contestant must identify what the phrase on the plate is.
What's Missing?	A common symbol or image is shown, with an obvious part left absent. The contestant must identify what would commonly be found on the image.
Word $lam	Nine letters are listed in random order. The object is to take the letters and make a smaller word based on the length requirement given. Each word may appear to have multiple answers; however, the host has an envelope containing the chosen words. The game may be played with three different-sized word requirements, at three, five, and seven letters, or may be played with three words of the same length.

== Other features ==
quiznation occasionally featured e-mails sent by viewers. Each episode may have a requested theme for e-mails. The tone of the e-mails varied widely, from serious to silly. Pictures may also be encouraged to be included.

== See also ==
- Quiz channel
- PlayMania
- 100 Winners
- Quiznation (Original UK program)
- Take the Cake
