= Angelle Tymon =

Angelle Marie Tymon (born April 4, 1983, from Lutcher, Louisiana) is an American broadcast journalist and game show host. She served as one of the hosts on GSN's interactive game show quiznation in the PlayMania Block.

== Biography ==
Tymon began her career as a communications student with a minor in dance at Louisiana State University. She performed as a member of the dance team for the NFL's New Orleans Saints for one year and the NBA's New Orleans Hornets for two years. In her junior year she transferred to California State University, Northridge as a broadcast journalism student.

While studying broadcast journalism at Cal State Northridge, she anchored, produced, wrote and edited for Valley View News, the university's public television newscast. Tymon won a 2007 Edward R. Murrow regional award for feature reporting. She earned the award for her work about Dimples karaoke bar, described as the first karaoke bar in the United States. Tymon did the reporting for KCSN-FM, the public radio station operated by Cal State Northridge. The Society of Professional Journalists also recognized Tymon's work on the story.

In November 2006, she began working as an intern for PlayMania. She worked several other positions for the network until she was promoted as an on-air host in April 2007. She hosted her first full show on April 22, 2007, and hosted until the program's end in October 2007. Tymon also taught 3rd and 4th grade math

Before joining PlayMania, Tymon hosted the live auction television shows Timeless Collections and Fine Arts.
