= Born Lucky (TV series) =

- Directed by: Bob Loudin
- Presented by: Bob Goen
- Announcer: Jonathan Coleman
- Composer: Gary Scott
- Country of origin: United States
- Original language: English
- No. of seasons: 1
- No. of episodes: 130

Production
- Executive producers: David G. Stanley; Scott A. Stone
- Producer: Stephen R. Brown
- Production locations: Glendale Galleria; Glendale, California (1992–93)
- Production company: Stone Stanley Entertainment

Original release
- Network: Lifetime
- Release: October 5, 1992 – April 2, 1993

Born Lucky is an American television game show. It was hosted by Bob Goen, with Jonathan Coleman announcing. Four contestants competed in stunts at various shopping malls for a chance to win $2,000 to spend at that mall. The first week's shows of Born Lucky were taped at the Glendale Galleria in California.

The show aired on Lifetime from October 5, 1992, to April 2, 1993. After the last episode aired, the show went into reruns on the same network from July 5 to December 31, 1993. For a brief period in 2000, PAX TV aired reruns of this series.

The show was loosely based on a 1989 British game show of the same name hosted by Jeremy Beadle. It also uses the announcer Johnathan Coleman like the British version of the same name.

== Format ==
Each player had a chance to win up to $100 (in what was referred to as "mall money") in the first round by participating in a stunt, such as trying to follow a sequence of commands, moving an item through a maze using a magnet held in the mouth in 60 seconds, or solving a series of brain teasers. Each stunt had five or ten parts and the contestant earned $10 or $20 for a fraction of success. The top two highest scoring players moved on to Round 2. Regardless of the outcome of the round, all contestants received a prize chosen blindly from a set of cards that were fanned out. If there was a tie (for last place, or if all tied), each person picked an envelope containing "mall money" not counting toward their scores. The player(s) who picked the most cash went on to round two.

=== Challenge Round ===
In the second round, the two remaining players were shown a stunt, and then bid against each other to see who could do more of the stunt (à la Name That Tune's Bid-a-Note round). For example, players may be asked to unwrap presents and don whatever accessory or article of clothing is in each unwrapped box; the contestants would then bid on how many items they could put on within 60 seconds. All stunts were played in either a 30, 45, or 60-second time limit. If the person accomplished the stunt before time ran out, he or she won. Otherwise, the opponent moved on.

=== Bonus Round ===
The winning player then got a chance to win a total of $2,000 (including tiebreaker winnings, if any) by accomplishing a series of 5 additional stunts in 90 seconds. They could pass on only one stunt and if time permitted, they went back to that stunt and he/she had to complete that remaining stunt to win the $2,000 in cash; otherwise, he/she received $100 for each stunt accomplished.

== Production ==
Born Lucky was filmed at Mission Viejo Mall, Glendale Galleria, and Galleria at Tyler. It is produced by Stone/Stanley Production.

== Reception ==
The Hollywood Reporter's Rick Sherwood penned a negative review of the show, writing, "The trouble is that they never really hone in [sic] on any one format or style, choosing instead a mishmash of styles. They probably thought the whole impromptu approach would give this show energy and humor, but it only comes off as silly." He said Bob Goen, the host, is the show's sole redeeming quality, providing the only touch of its refinement. Sherwood continued, "Without him, it would be even too juvenile for daytime. In the end, the biggest problem here is that there is nothing unique about this program except the setting, and that isn't even explored properly here."

== British Version ==
The original British version hosted by Jeremy Beadle, aired on ITV from 11 to 22 December 1989. the only difference from its American counterpart is that Beadle raids Bingo halls and Shopping centres instead of malls looking for potential contestants.

== Reruns ==
The series was also aired on PAX (later I, now Ion Television) for a brief period in 2000.
