= GSN Radio =

American internet radio game show

- Listen. Play. Win!
- Other names: GSN Radio
- Genre: Game show
- Running time: 4 hours (with brief advertisements)
- Country of origin: United States
- Language: English
- Hosted by: Bob Goen; Marianne Curan
- Announcer: Anna Graves; Craig Jansson
- Created by: Bill Davidson; Bruce Goldberg; Craig Jansson; Shane Yeend
- Written by: Johnny Mansbach
- Produced by: Chris "Cisco" Donovan; Johnny Mansbach
- Executive producers: Bill Davidson; Craig Jansson; Shane Yeend
- Edited by: Clint Chin Quan; John Servedio
- Recording studio: Santa Monica, California
- Original release: August 18, 2008 – November 13, 2009
- No. of episodes: 298
- Audio format: Stereophonic sound

Game Show Network Radio is an American interactive internet radio game show that originally aired live on GSN.com from August 18, 2008, to November 13, 2009, hosted by husband and wife team Bob Goen and Marianne Curan. Other co-hosts filled in when one of them was unavailable. The four-hour program featured interactive games that listeners played to win cash and other prizes. The show aired from 1–5 P.M. Eastern every Monday through Friday afternoon.

== Format and rules ==
GSN Radio was an internet radio game show in which home listeners are the contestants. Listeners anywhere in the world of age 21 or older could enter the contest by using the network's website or dialing a phone number, both of which were methods free of charge. If an entry was selected to participate in the game, the contestant was called on his telephone. The contestant then, either alone or with an opponent, played live on-air. A contestant may enter 10 times via telephone and 25 times on the internet per each 24-hour period. One week after the original 24-hour period in which an entry was submitted, that entry was cleared from the queue, and any entrants who wished to play more games are required to re-enter.

Some special games (occasionally referred to as Marquis Games) required that listeners register specifically for them on the GSN Radio website. For these games, a contestant may also enter 25 times each 24-hour period. These entries were not grouped with the entries of the regular games. All entries were cleared from the queue after the game was declared won (or over). Any entrants who wished to play another special game were required to re-enter.

Regardless of the method of entry, each entry had an equal chance of being selected. An entry did not necessarily guarantee an opportunity to play on the show.

== Games ==
GSN Radio logo (August 2008 - November 2008)

GSN Radio featured various minigames that were played throughout the program. The rewards for the games were usually prizes of $100 in cash, although some games had potential payouts of $200, $1,000 and $2,500. Imagination Games partnered with GSN to bring some of their original and licensed games to the radio format.

In a situation where a tie needed to be broken, a question related to the game was posed. The first contestant to yell out his name was given a chance to answer. If his answer was correct, he would be declared the winner. If he was incorrect, his opponent won by default.

During its 15-month run, 33 games were played in rotation on GSN Radio.

Game	Instructions
Backwords	One contestant will hear four words spelled and pronounced backwards, preceded by the number of letters, the initial letter, and a hint. If he can identify all four words in 50 seconds, he wins.
Battle of the Sexes	Two contestants of opposite genders are selected to play. Each contestant will receive three questions, valued at one point each, based on trivia generally associated with the opposite sex. The contestant with the most points wins.
Beat the Bomb	Similar to the British bong game, one contestant hears a pre-recorded voice list off several increasing dollar amounts. If the contestant says "stop" after an amount, he wins that cash value. However, if a "bomb" noise is heard before he says "stop", the game is over and he wins nothing. The maximum amount that can be won in this game is $200.
Birthday Game	The host "spins a wheel" adorned with all twelve months. If the contestant has the same birth month as the wheel landed on, he will win a $50 cash prize. If the host "spins" the date on which the contestant was born, he wins $2,500 in cash. Listeners wishing to play this game must register specifically for it on the GSN Radio website.
B.S.	Both hosts will tell a story about something that may have happened to them in their life. To help determine the story's validity, the caller has thirty seconds to interrogate each host about their story. The caller must determine which one is a true story. If he does that successfully, he wins.
Can You Beat The Fifth Caller?	The champion of the previous game comes back to play, while another four contestants are contacted but do not play. The fifth person contacted plays a round of three trivia questions against the first contestant. The first two questions are worth three points, while the third is worth six. If a contestant wishes to receive multiple choices, the value of the question decrease to one point (or two points on question three). The contestant with the most points after the third round wins, and comes back to play on the next show.
Catch 21	Similar to the GSN original. Two contestants, both of whom are trying to get a total as close to 21 as possible without going over, take turns receiving cards drawn by the host. A contestant may discard a card only once. The person who receives 21 first, or who is remaining after his opponent busts, is the winner.
Celebrity Head	Two contestants listen to a quote from a famous celebrity. The first contestant may ask yes or no questions to try to close in on the identity of the celebrity. If a "no" answer is received, control goes to the opponent. The first contestant to identify the celebrity wins.
Celebrity Name Dropper	A sequence of five celebrity sound bites is heard. Multiple contestants may be chosen to take a guess at all five sound bites. If the contestant is able to identify all of them, he will be declared the winner and win one thousand dollars. If not, another contestant may be given a chance. This game is carried over to a following show if not solved.
Fact or Crap	Based on the board game, a contestant is read three statements. If he can correctly determine whether each statement is true or false, he wins.
Film Degrees of Separation	Based upon Six Degrees of Kevin Bacon, the game starts out with a celebrity. A trivia question is asked regarding an actor that starred in the same film as he. Two more questions are asked based upon film connections with the last celebrity. If all three questions are answered correctly, the contestant wins. This is the winner of the My Game Show Idea contest, submitted by Eric in New Jersey.
Food Court	A contestant is read three sets of two food items. If he can determine which item in each set has the most calories, he wins.
High Rollin'	Similar to the program Card Sharks; to begin, the contestant starts with ten dollars. He may walk away with the cash instead of playing the game. If he declines, the contestant's first card in their row is revealed. The contestant guesses whether the next card in the row will be "higher" or "lower"; if correct or a push, he wins another ten dollars. If incorrect, he loses all accumulated money. After a correct guess, he can choose to guess the result of the next card or walk away with his money. During the game, the contestant has one opportunity to replace one showing card in the line but he must play that card. The game ends when a contestant loses all his money after an incorrect guess or walks away with his acquired cash. Coordinator Nicole Blais deals the cards in this game.
In Order to Win	One contestant will be given three sets of items, each with increasing quantity. If he can put each of them in the correct order desired by the host, he wins.
It's Good to be Popular	A contestant is given a Family Feud-style survey question. If he gives an answer in the top five of the survey, he can give another guess. If he gives an incorrect answer, the next contestant in the queue will get to give an answer. The person who gives the last remaining answer wins the game.
The Money List	Throughout the show, four sets of five pieces of information related to a category are given. A contestant is chosen to state how many of the given facts (up to twenty), each valued at five dollars, he can list. If he can meet his quota, he wins. If he gives an incorrect piece of information or does not fill his quota, he wins nothing.
Motormouth	Famous speed talker John Moschitta, Jr. gives hints of decreasing difficulty describing a celebrity or facet of pop culture at a rapid pace. If a contestant feels he knows the answer, he shouts his name. If he is correct, he wins the game. An incorrect answer allows his opponent to receive a guess. If both are incorrect, Moschitta restarts from the beginning of the hints. The first contestant to guess correctly is declared the winner.
Pop-arazzi	Two contestants are given hints of decreasing difficulty describing a celebrity or facet of pop culture. If a contestant feels he knows the answer, he shouts his name. If he is correct, he receives one point. An incorrect answer allows his opponent to receive one unopposed clue and a free guess. The first contestant to receive two points is declared the winner.
Screen Test	A contestant is played a small quote from a famous film. If he can identify from which film the clip comes from, he wins.
Secret Sound	An ambiguous sound is played. Multiple contestants may be chosen to take a guess at what the sound is. If the contestant is able to identify the sound, he will win one thousand dollars. If not, another contestant may be given a chance. This game may be carried over to a following show if not solved. Listeners wishing to play this game must register specifically for it on the GSN Radio website.
Snipe It	Under an unspecified time limit, two contestants go back and forth giving answers that fit a category. The last contestant to give a correct answer before time runs out wins a point. The first contestant to score two points wins the game.
Soapbox	The contestant will be given a topic. He must, for thirty seconds, speak about the subject without stopping, hesitating, using too much repetition or using any hesitation words. If he fulfills that, he wins.
Star Game	Three questions are asked relating to astrology. If the contestant correctly answers all three, he wins.
Stat Attack	A contestant is asked three higher/lower questions regarding a set of published statistics. If he can answer all three correctly, he wins.
TENsion	A contestant is asked a trivia question. If he answers correctly, he receives another. If he answers incorrectly, the next contestant in the queue will receive that question. The person who answers the tenth question in the set correctly will be declared the winner.
$1,000 Minute	A contestant is given 60 seconds to answer ten questions correctly with as many guesses as he needs. He may pass a question and return to it (time permitting); a repeated question is presented in a dual-choice format. If he answers all ten questions correctly, he wins $1,000.
Today's The Day	A contestant is asked three trivia questions about events pertaining to the day's date. If he answers all three correctly, he wins.
Tribond	The contestants receives three sets of three different, yet related, items. The contestant must identify what the common bond is between the items. If the contestant is able to identify all three sets correctly, he wins. The player is permitted 15 seconds to make as many guesses as possible.
Ultimate Trivia	A contestant is asked five trivia questions about a certain pop culture topic. If he answers all five correctly, he wins. This game sometimes features a celebrity associated with the film or television program reading the questions.
Urban Myth	Similar to Fact or Crap, a contestant is read three statements. If he can correctly determine whether each statement is true or false, he wins.
What Did Ollie Say?	The four-year-old son of Australian producer Craig Janssen will say a phrase, accompanied by a hint. If the contestant can exactly identify all three phrases Ollie says, he wins.
Would You Rather?	A host is previously asked three "would you rather?" questions. If the contestant can correctly predict how the host answered all three questions, he wins.
The Wrong Game	The contestant must answer three three-choice questions. If he answers all of them incorrectly, he wins.

== Other features ==
Outside of the traditional mini-game shows, GSN Radio often featured other segments.

=== Competitions ===
Since November 6, 2008, to the cancellation of the program, in addition to the regular on-air games, GSN Radio sponsored two other competitions offering cash.

Competition	Instructions
Captain Ca$h	Participants called the Captain Ca$h phone number and, in thirty seconds or less, left a message detailing why he thinks he should be awarded a cash prize or what he would do if the cash prize was awarded to him. On Monday through Thursday, three requests were played for the Captain. He chose one request each day to be a finalist. On Friday, the "Captain" announced on the program who, from the four finalists, he is awarding a cash prize to. Entrants could the Captain Ca$h phone number once a day, but multiple entries did not necessarily increase chances of selection.
My Game Show Idea	Participants had to log on to the GSN Radio website and, using 2500 words or less, submit his own game show concept he would like to see played. At the end of the contest period, one concept was chosen. The winner received $500 in cash and has his game played in rotation on GSN Radio. The contest concluded on January 26, 2009, with the game "Film Degrees of Separation", submitted by Eric in New Jersey, declared the winner.

=== Guest appearances ===
Often in conjunction with games on the show, celebrity participants appeared in the program. Such instances include Jeopardy! champion Ken Jennings guesting on October 31, 2008, to play a special trivia challenge and Howie Mandel appearing on December 5, 2008, to play a special version of Would You Rather?. Other actors appeared to ask questions in the Ultimate Trivia game related to their shows, such as John O'Hurley asking questions about Seinfeld as J. Peterman and Kate Flannery asking questions about The Office.

== Syndication and The Best of GSN Radio ==
When GSN Radio was not live, The Best of GSN Radio was streamed on the show's website. The program continuously featured repeat airings of past games once played live. This program was also aired on terrestrial radio stations.

Condensed versions of The Best of GSN Radio were syndicated to stations in North America for airings on Saturdays and Sundays. The Best Of was also available for syndication to dozens of other stations through a division of Radio America.

== See also ==
- GSN Live
- PlayMania
