= Shandi Finnessey =

American model (born 1978)

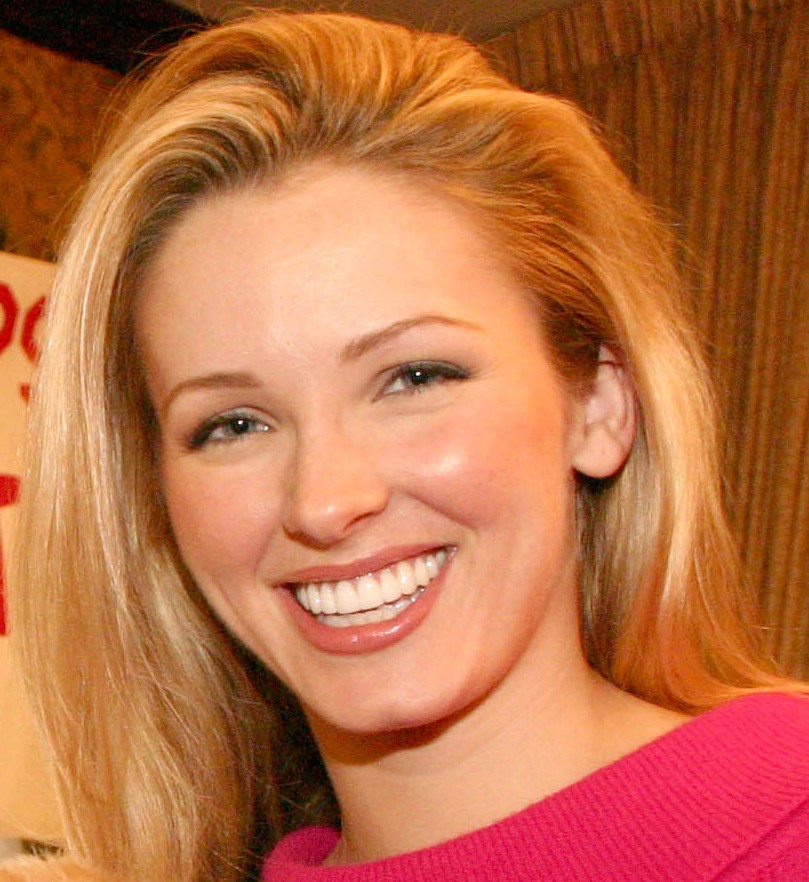
- Finnessey during her reign as Miss USA
- Born: Shandi Ren Finnessey; June 9, 1978 (age 48); Florissant, Missouri, U.S.
- Education: Lindenwood University
- Occupations: Actress, Model
- Height: 180 cm (5 ft 11 in)
- Spouse: Ben Higgins (m. 2015)
- Children: 3
- Beauty pageant titleholder
- Title: Miss Missouri 2002; Miss Missouri USA 2004; Miss USA 2004
- Years active: 1999-present
- Hair color: Blonde
- Eye color: Blue
- Major competitions: Miss Missouri 2002; (Winner); Miss America 2003; (Unplaced); Miss Missouri USA 2004; (Winner); Miss USA 2004; (Winner); Miss Universe 2004; (1st Runner-Up)
- Website: www.shandi.info

Shandi Ren Finnessey (born June 9, 1978) is an American actress, model, TV host and beauty pageant titleholder. She is best known for winning the Miss USA title, as Miss Missouri USA. She previously held the title of Miss Missouri 2002 and competed in Miss America, where she won a preliminary award. She placed as first runner-up at the Miss Universe 2004 competition.

She is one of three women to have been both Miss Missouri USA and Miss Missouri and the only Missourian to have been Miss USA. Her first runner-up finish at Miss Universe was the best placement in the 2000s and was the best United States placement between Brook Mahealani Lee's Miss Universe 1997 competition victory and Olivia Culpo's Miss Universe 2012 pageant win.

In 2002, Finnessey authored a children's book, The Furrtails, on individuality and disabilities. In the mid-2000s, she was Chuck Woolery's co-host for the game show Lingo on the Game Show Network. Finessey has also hosted PlayMania as well as quiznation and has served as a sideline reporter for the CBS tournament blackjack series Ultimate Blackjack Tour.

== Early life and education ==
Finnessey was born to Patrick and Linda Finnessey, and she grew up in Florissant, Missouri. She attended McCluer North High School public high school for two years where, according to an interview with ABILITY Magazine, she was teased a lot for her appearance. Finnessey recounted that she "had a mullet, tinted glasses, acne and braces." The teasing made it difficult for her to focus on her studies, so for her junior year she transferred to the private all-girls Incarnate Word Academy, where she graduated in 1996. She completed a Bachelor of Science degree in psychology from Lindenwood University in December 1999. Following graduation, she worked briefly as a full-time substitute teacher in Jackson, Missouri, before starting graduate school. She began working on her Masters in Counseling, also at Lindenwood, but postponed her studies after being crowned Miss USA in 2004.

== Pageants ==
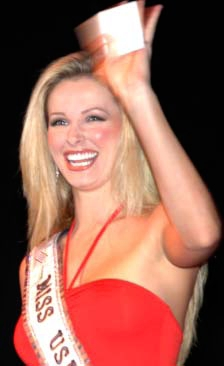
Miss USA 2004 Shandi Finnessey waves to the crowd during a July Fourth USO show at Camp Casey.

=== Participation ===
Finnessey first competed in the Miss Missouri USA 2000 pageant in 1999 where, as Miss Saint Louis County in her senior year of college, she finished first runner-up to Denette Roderick. She competed again in the following year (2000) and placed second runner-up behind first runner-up Melana Scantlin and winner Larissa Meek in the Miss Missouri USA 2001 event.

In 2000, Finnessey competed in the Miss Oktoberfest pageant and was third runner-up. First runner-up was Jennifer Glover, the previous Miss United States International 1999 and the future Miss California 2002 and Miss California USA 2001.

On November 18, 2000, Finnessey won the Miss Jackson title in the Miss Missouri system and finished second runner-up to Jennifer Hover in the June 3–9, 2001 Miss Missouri pageant held in Mexico, MO. Finnessey won the Miss St. Louis Metro local title in the Miss Missouri system and went on to win the 2002 Miss Missouri title, succeeding Hover. She won the contest despite having slammed her hand in a car door that weekend. During the contest, she performed an arrangement of "Flight of the Bumblebee" on the piano for her talent. During her on-stage interview as one of the five finalists, she was asked what she learned having three brothers and she answered to be quick in the bathroom.

She represented Missouri in the Miss America 2003 pageant, where she won an evening gown preliminary award but did not place. For the talent portion of the competition in the Miss America system events (which the Miss USA system does not use) at times she played the violin and at other times the piano. In the competition to be Miss America, she played the piano.

Less than a year after giving up her Miss Missouri title, as Miss Metro St. Louis USA 2003, Finnessey won the Miss Missouri USA pageant on her third attempt at Black River Coliseum in Poplar Bluff, Missouri, and was crowned by outgoing titleholder Tara Bollinger. During her six-month reign as Miss Missouri USA, Finnessey was involved in such charities as the Variety Club Telethon, St. Louis Cardinals Winter Warm Up for local charities, AIDS Foundation, Special Olympics in St. Louis, Missouri and Gilda's Club. She joined Barbara Webster (Miss Missouri 1983 and Miss Missouri USA 1986) and Robin Elizabeth Riley (Miss Missouri 1987 and Miss Missouri USA 1983) as qualifiers to both of the nationally televised beauty pageants.

She represented Missouri in the April 12, 2004, nationally televised Miss USA 2004 pageant at the Kodak Theatre in Los Angeles in front of hosts Nancy O'Dell and Billy Bush and judges Jeff Gordon, Jerry Buss, John Salley, Mekhi Phifer, Rocco DiSpirito and Jill Stuart. Her final question was whether experience or education serves a person better in life to which she answered "Definitely experience because you get your knowledge through experience." She competed on the platform of integrating people with mental challenges into society. In the nationally televised pageant, she became the first woman from Missouri to win the Miss USA title. During her reign as Miss USA, Finnessey became an advocate for breast cancer and ovarian cancer awareness and research. She has also worked with Special Olympics, the National Down Syndrome Convention, American Cancer Society and Derek Jeter's Turn 2 Foundation (which helps at-risk kids choose healthier lifestyles). Finnessey resided in a luxury Riverside Drive apartment in New York City provided by the Miss Universe Organization and pageant co-owner Donald Trump.

As Miss USA, Finnessey went on to represent the United States at the international Miss Universe competition held in Quito, Ecuador, in May 2004, culminating on June 1, 2004. Her national costume was inspired by a Native American feathered headdress. She placed first runner-up in the internationally broadcast competition, behind winner Jennifer Hawkins of Australia. The event was hosted by Bush and Daisy Fuentes and the judges included Petra Nemcova, Emilio Estefan and Bo Derek.

As Miss USA, Finnessey represented the Miss Universe Organization. Her Miss Universe Organization "sister" 2004 titleholders were Jennifer Hawkins (Miss Universe, of Australia) and Shelley Hennig (Miss Teen USA, of Louisiana). Her contemporary Miss America titleholder was Ericka Dunlap (Florida).

=== Ceremonial duties ===
Finnessey provided color commentary at the Miss USA 2005 pageant live from Baltimore, Maryland, on April 11, where she was the outgoing titleholder. On July 23, 2006, she also co-hosted the Miss Universe 2006 pageant live from Los Angeles, California, as a commentator with Carson Kressley. The show's main hosts were Carlos Ponce and Nancy O'Dell. Finnessey has also co-hosted subsequent Miss Missouri USA pageants. She again served as a commentator for the Miss Universe 2011 pageant in São Paulo, Brazil along with Jeannie Mai on September 12, 2011.

She joined a panel of celebrity judges to judged Miss USA 2009 pageant held at the Planet Hollywood Resort & Casino, Las Vegas, Nevada, on April 19, 2009. That year when Miss California USA 2009 Carrie Prejean caused a notable controversy during her on-stage finalist interview with a response that she was opposed to same-sex marriage, Finnessey participated in a Miss California USA organization public service announcement promoting diversity along with several other Miss Universe Organization beauty pageant titlists.

== Post-pageants ==
After completing her reign as Miss USA, Finnessey became a co-host of Lingo and PlayMania on GSN. She hosted Lingo from August 2005 at the start of the show's fourth season until the show went on hiatus in 2008. In April 2006, she began her turn with the interactive series PlayMania, which broke into two shows on February 23, 2007. Finnessey became the co-host of the quiznation spinoff, a revised but similar version of the original PlayMania. She remained a co-host until October 21, 2007, several days before the show's finale. She also was a sideline reporter for the CBS tournament blackjack series Ultimate Blackjack Tour.

She also has appeared in several documentaries produced by GSN. She has also appeared on the NBC reality show The Apprentice (February 15, 2005, episode 3.5), in the November 13, 2004, 20 Sexiest Men and 20 Sexiest Women specials on CMT, and as grand marshal in the November 25, 2004, Macy's Thanksgiving Day Parade. She was named one of the Ten Outstanding Young Americans of 2006 by the Jaycees. She also appeared alongside Chris Myers as part of the coverage of the New Year's Eve 2007 Festivities for Fox. On March 19, 2007, Finnessey debuted on the fourth season of Dancing with the Stars. Her professional dance partner was Brian Fortuna, and she was the second celebrity voted off the show. On October 31 and November 21, 2007, she appeared as a guest celebrity on NBC's Phenomenon. She also hosted Hollywood Fast Track, a web based show about movies, music, and trends in Hollywood. She is also the host/co-host of several TV Guide Network specials. On September 2, 2008, Finnessey was on the season finale of Wanna Bet? on ABC, where she made a record for the biggest successful bet on the show betting $20,000 in the first best. Finnessey lost in the end betting $40,000 and guessing incorrectly. In August, 2010, she appeared on a special "Girls of Summer" week airing of NBC's Minute to Win It on an episode called "Last Beauty Standing." The episode featured 10 beauty pageant winners competing for $100,000 towards their chosen charities along with a chance to win a $1,000,000 challenge. At the Miss USA 2011 competition, she was among the 31 former winners who were part of a photoshoot layout for Time Magazine. She played the role of Stephie in the Roger Corman-produced Sharktopus (2010) which aired on the Syfy Channel three years before the same network made waves with its Sharknado movie franchise.

In January 2012, she became one of the original reporters for ENTV News (a branch of TVLine) on a premium YouTube Channel. In March 2013, she was selected as one of 36 bachelorettes to compete on the reality television show Ready for Love. Finnessey was the winner for bachelor Ernesto Arguello, but the relationship ended briefly after the show.

On August 8, 2013, she was named as one of five correspondents for the entertainment magazine, OK!TV, that was scheduled to debut on September 9.

== Personal life ==
"I conquered a fear of heights and water by bungee jumping from a crane over a lake. And if that's not crazy enough, I also wrestled a greased pig in a mud pit."

— Shandi Finnessey

Her parents are Patrick and Linda Finnessey. She has three brothers (Shane, Damion, and Paul), and her grandmothers' names are Mildred Finnessey and Fern Miller.

According to the press release issued at the time of her first public appearance as Miss USA on April 17, 2004, in New York City, she plays both the violin and piano. She also practices yoga, meditation and performs knitting and abstract painting. In 2003, she dated August Busch IV and has also dated Italo Zanzi. She is a Republican, and during her Miss USA reign, she attended the Commander-in-Chief's Ball at the second inauguration of George W. Bush.

Her Miss USA press release also notes that she began her professional modelling career at the age of six. She modeled with Ford Models in Chicago and Talent Plus in St. Louis. According to the Miss USA website at the time of her reign, her modelling experience included television commercials, runway modelling, newspaper and magazine ads as well as upscale fashion store experience. She claims to have once wrestled a greased pig. As of 2011, her parents still lived in the house where she grew up in Florissant.

In 2013, Finnessey became a contestant on Ready for Love where she competed for the attention of Ernesto Arguello. She won Arguello's heart on the show, but the relationship was short-lived in real life. Later that year, she posed nude for a PETA anti-fur campaign opposing the distribution of fur coats as prizes during beauty pageants. On September 24, 2014, Finnessey announced on Twitter that she became engaged to businessman Ben Higgins. They were married on July 11, 2015, according to another autobiographical tweet. The couple has three sons; Finn Arthur (born June 10, 2016), Bodhi James (born May 1, 2018) and Charlie Bear (born May 5, 2020).

=== Scholarly work ===
Finnessey authored an award-winning children's book. Her book, which was published on August 1, 2002, was entitled Furrtails and helps the effort to integrate intellectually disabled children into regular classrooms and helps children appreciate individuality and understand their peers who have disabilities. She was recognized with an Authors Who Make a Difference award, known as AWMAD, (from Infinity Publishing) and a Ryan Brems Award for this work. She authored a second book entitled Suzanna the Banana.

== Filmography ==
Film
Year	Title	Role	Notes
2010	Sharktopus	Stephie	TV movie
2012	Piranhaconda	Kimmy Weston	TV movie
2013	Garbage	Rodeo drive model	

== Pageantography ==
Contest	Notes	Title	Date
Miss Missouri USA 2000	1st runner-up	Miss Saint Louis County	c. August 29, 1999
Miss Oktoberfest 2000	3rd runner-up		October 5, 2000
Miss Missouri 2001	2nd runner-up	Miss Jackson	June 9, 2001
Miss Missouri USA 2001	2nd runner-up		
Miss Missouri 2002	Winner	Miss St. Louis Metro	June 8, 2002
Miss America 2003	Preliminary evening wear	Miss Missouri	September 21, 2002
Miss Missouri USA 2004	Winner	Miss Metro St. Louis	c. November 14, 2003
Miss USA 2004	Winner	Miss Missouri USA	April 12, 2004
Miss Universe 2004	1st runner-up	Miss USA	June 1, 2004

Awards and achievements
Preceded by (Venezuela) Mariángel Ruiz	Miss Universe 1st Runner-Up; 2004	Succeeded by (Puerto Rico) Cynthia Olavarría
Preceded by Susie Castillo	Miss USA; 2004	Succeeded by Chelsea Cooley
Preceded by Tara Bollinger	Miss Missouri USA; 2004	Succeeded by Ashley Litton
Preceded by Jennifer Hover	Miss Missouri; 2002	Succeeded by Amber Etheridge
