= Perfect Match (American game show) =

- Genre: Game show
- Created by: David Briggs
- Directed by: Joseph Behar
- Presented by: Bob Goen
- Narrated by: Johnny Gilbert
- Country of origin: United States

Production
- Executive producers: Bob Synes; Scott A. Stone; Jay Feldman
- Producer: Scott Sternberg
- Production locations: Hollywood Center Studios; Hollywood, California
- Production company: XPTLA Company

Original release
- Network: Syndication
- Release: January 13 – September 12, 1986

Perfect Match is an American game show that was hosted by Bob Goen and announced by Johnny Gilbert, which aired from January 13 to September 12, 1986, in syndication. The game featured three married couples answering questions about their spouses to win money.

Perfect Match was Goen's first game show and the second game show to be distributed by Lorimar-Telepictures after Lorimar Productions purchased Telepictures in 1985. The show was a production of XPTLA, Inc.

The Perfect Match had also been the name of an earlier TV game show, which aired in syndication in 1967-68 hosted by Dick Enberg and featured a computer dating theme.

== Development ==
A year before Perfect Match debuted, Telepictures developed another game show, Catch Phrase, and sold it to stations with what they called an "insurance policy". The condition was that if a station wanted to buy Catch Phrase and the show was not able to make it through the 1985-86 season, Telepictures would give the station another program to air at no additional cost to it. Catch Phrase faced ratings trouble from the start, and in November 1985 Lorimar-Telepictures commissioned a pilot for what was initially called Make a Match, with Jim Lange hosting. The pilot was well received by company executives and Lorimar-Telepictures decided to put the series into production, but before production began the name of the show was changed to Perfect Match.

Entering December 1985, according to a report in Broadcasting Magazine, Lorimar-Telepictures vice president Peter Temple said the ratings for Catch Phrase were showing "no upside". Telepictures president Dick Robertson confirmed this in a videotaped message he sent to stations around this same time, saying that the lack of growth in the ratings proved the show "wasn't working" and that the company was taking the drastic step of putting the insurance policy into effect immediately.

As such, Catch Phrase ceased production after sixty-five episodes and its last episode aired on January 10, 1986. The stations airing the now-cancelled Catch Phrase began receiving Perfect Match on January 13, 1986. Since there was such a quick turnaround between pilot and production, there had not been an official host named when Robertson announced the series and Lange was not going to be available, as he was committed to hosting another XPTLA production, The $1,000,000 Chance of a Lifetime, which premiered one week before Perfect Match; the producers then offered the position to Goen, who at the time was a reporter for ESPN.

== Gameplay ==
=== Main game ===
Three married couples attempted to match their spouse's answers to questions they had answered before the game. Each team began with a bankroll of $200. For each question, the spouse's answer to it was shown to the home viewers. Prior to giving an answer, the other spouse wagered an amount between $10 and their entire bankroll based on his or her ability to provide a matching response. Providing the same response added the wager to their bankroll but a non-matching response meant that their wager was deducted from the bankroll. Three questions were played.

=== Bonus round ===
Each of the couples competed against each other by predicting how their spouses would write "love letters" to the other. These were written before the show. Each letter contained three missing words and/or phrases. The husbands read their letters first, and for each match the wives made, their team earned $100. The process was reversed and repeated with each match the husbands made worth $200.

The couple who had the most money at the end of the round won an additional $1,000; however, each couple kept any money earned throughout the game. If two or three couples were tied at the end of the game, the $1,000 was split between the tied couples and a three way did happen at least once. But if any couple matched all of the words in their love letters, they won a total of $5,000.
