= Outside the Box Comedy Club =

Comedy club in London, England

Coordinates: 51°24′38″N 0°17′53″W

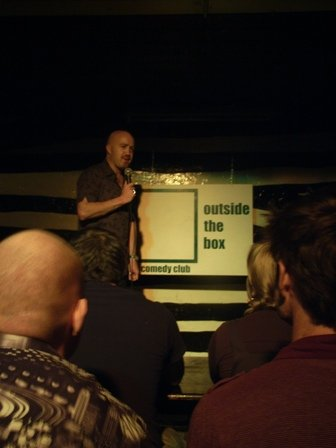
Andy Parsons at Outside The Box

Outside the Box is a comedy club located in the backroom of The Fighting Cocks pub in Kingston-upon-Thames. It was opened in November 2006 by comedian Maff Brown.

Three months after attending a comedy course in the summer of 2006, Brown established the club in order to test his own material before taking it around the comedy circuit.

Over the years, the comedy club has extended to various locations in and around London, and there are now regular shows in Kingston-upon-Thames, Sevenoaks, Hampton, Surbiton and Windsor

The club is currently used by celebrity comedians to road test newly written work. Notable comics who have performed include:

- Robin Williams
- Jimmy Carr
- Jack Dee
- Russell Brand
- Lee Mack
- Frank Skinner
- Johnny Vegas
- Stephen Merchant
- Bill Bailey
- Lucy Parsons
- Sean Lock
- Rich Hall
- Omid Djalili
- Dara Ó Briain
- Andy Parsons
- Jo Brand
- Robin Ince
- Jack Whitehall
- Tim Vine
- Russell Kane
- Rhys Darby
- Tommy Tiernan
- Russell Howard
- Lenny Henry
- Alan Carr
- Al Murray
- Milton Jones
- Jon Richardson
- Dan Antopolski
- Richard Herring
- Rob Deering
- Reginald D. Hunter
- Nick Frost
- Michael McIntyre
- Lee Hurst
- Mark Steel
- Mark Watson
- Greg Davies
- Rufus Hound
- Tom Rosenthal
- Dave Gorman
- Chris Addison

The Kingston club holds 80 people and runs on a weekly basis. All other nights, such as the Sevenoaks club, hold 300-400 people but run monthly.

== Awards ==
- Chortle Awards 2005 Best London Venue (Small)
- The Guardian The 4th Best Comedy Club in the UK
