= Quiznation (British game show) =

Quiznation logo

Quiznation is a television programme on the British quiz channel by the same name that was owned and operated by Optimistic Entertainment. In its last year, it featured hours of gaming each day. Quiznation aired all week on Fortune Fever from 6 pm to 8 pm featuring constant tower games. On 31 May 2007, Quiznation aired its last episode.

== History ==
Quiznation started in November 2003 on Sky channel 277. The channel was originally called Nation277. Shortly after launch, it was moved to channel 217 during an EPG reshuffle, and subsequently changed its name to Nation217. It helped launch the careers of Caroline Flack, Milo McCabe and Christian Manley and it had Brendan Sheppard as one of its main directors. Different interactive games were on for most of the day. Though under the larger banner of Gamenation, Nation217 showed a variety of interactive programming including The Cash Vault and Dare. Nation217 then started to cease some of the programmes and replaced the slots with Quiznation. Eventually, Quiznation was the entire output for the channel. The channel was then officially renamed to Quiznation.

In late 2005, Quiznation started to bring back some of its axed programming starting with Celebrity Sudoku. They introduced more shows like Initial Thinking and Taxi. At the beginning of 2006, Quiznation cut back its broadcasting hours to three hours a night and began airing nothing but the Quiznation programme again.

This format was adapted to the United States as PlayMania in April 2006. Presenter Mel Peachey co-hosted the programme throughout the next year. It was split into two separate shows in February 2007, one being renamed quiznation, taking after its predecessor.

The 31 May 2007 episode was Quiznation's final airing. The programme finished with a highlight reel of Quiznation moments.

== Programmes featured ==
This is an incomplete list of some of the programmes featured on Nation277, Nation217 and Quiznation.

- Bowling for Bucks - Hosted by Debbie King.
- Cash Command - Hosted by Hannah Peckham (Daily on Nation217 at 8 pm).
- The Cash Vault — A question is posed. When a caller answers a question correctly, he or she can choose one of 100 doors in the Cash Vault. Each door has a prize amount behind it. This was adapted to become 100 Winners in the PlayMania Block in the United States.
- Celebrity Sudoku — A game similar to Sudoku is played, using pictures of celebrities rather than numbers. Started as Play Sudoku on ITV2.
- Dare - Also aired on ITV2.
- Hot or Cold
- Initial Thinking — Conundrums such as 12 D of C or 1 F O the C N are posed. The caller must identify what the letters and numbers stand for.
- Music Nation
- Taxi
- The Morning After Girls - An early evening quiz show for the lads. Hosted by Caroline Flack and Olivia Lee.
- Flipside TV - Later aired on Channel 4 from August to September 2004, before moving to Paramount Comedy 2.
- Christmas Nation - Hosted by Yemi and Anouska in Christmas 2005, showing a Game and also showing Music Videos and Entertainment (Pre-Recorded).
- It's Your Call - An evening show featuring a studio contestant who would ask for help from callers at home to win cash prize. Hosted by either Dean Wilson or Anthony Heywood.

== List of presenters ==
- Tim Dixon
- Caroline Flack
- Anthony Heywood
- Debbie King
- Olivia Lee
- Christian Manley
- Milo McCabe
- Mel Peachey
- Hannah Peckham
- Adèle Sica
- Luke Toyne
- Dean Wilson
