= PlayMania =

- PlayMania logo (February 2007–October 2007)
- Written by: Joyce Salter
- Directed by: Jason Challinor; Trey Evans
- Presented by: Shandi Finnessey; Mel Peachey; Jessica York; Angelle Tymon; Jeff Thisted
- Country of origin: United States
- Original language: English
- No. of episodes: Original Run: 204; Incl. Block: 398

Production
- Executive producers: John P. Roberts; Simon Willis
- Producers: Oyama Caviness; Andrew Collins; Johnny Mansbach; Adam Mitchenall
- Camera setup: Multi-camera
- Running time: 120 minutes

Original release
- Network: GSN
- Release: April 6, 2006 – October 31, 2007

Related
- Quiznation; 100 Winners; Midnight Money Madness

PlayMania was a live interactive game show on GSN, hosted by Mel Peachey, Shandi Finnessey, Jessica York, Angelle Tymon, and Jeff Thisted. The two-hour program featured interactive games that the viewers could play to win cash prizes.

On February 20, 2007, the show was replaced with two separate programs, quiznation and 100 Winners which were collectively known as the PlayMania Block.

== Format ==
The original PlayMania was a game show in which home viewers were the contestants. American residents 18 or older could enter the contest by text messaging for a small fee, or using the network's website to enter free. From January to April 2007 a premium-rate phone number was available to use as an entry method, as well. Within a few moments, a contestant was notified whether or not his or her entry had been chosen (at random) to proceed to another random selection process. If an entry was selected in the second phase, the contestant would then be called on his or her home or mobile phone, depending on which method of entry had been used. The contestant would then, if the game was still in progress, play on-air. After a game was completed, the queue was cleared, and any entrants who wished to play the next game were required to re-enter. A $.99 fee applied for each text message entry or premium rate phone call, along with standard text messaging rates added to the former. Entries on the network's website were free. Regardless of the method of entry, each entry had an equal chance of being selected. An entry did not necessarily guarantee an opportunity to appear on the show. Residents of certain states were ineligible to play using various entry methods.

The PlayMania Block shows continued to use the same entry process.

== Programming history ==
Right side of April - August 2006 set.

The original format of PlayMania was based on Quiznation, a British television channel produced by Optimistic Entertainment. Optimistic was also co-producer of the American PlayMania, and Mel Peachey, one of the hosts of Quiznation, was brought over to host the American version. After the division of PlayMania into two separate programs, the Quiznation name would be used in the United States, as well. PlayMania originally was scheduled to air three days a week in April 2006, from 1–3 AM (Eastern Time); a Sunday broadcast was added on August 27, and Tuesday and Wednesday editions were added on October 3 and October 4 of that year. The airtime of the show changed to 12 midnight–2 AM (ET) beginning with the August 24, 2006, episode.

On February 20, 2007, PlayMania was divided into two separate programs. Collectively, these shows, quiznation and 100 Winners, became known as "the PlayMania Block." While 100 Winners presented a format novel to American viewers, the quiznation program shared games and a similar format with the original PlayMania.

By June 14, 2007, all scheduled airings of 100 Winners had been replaced with quiznation episodes. The show is considered indefinitely canceled from the programming schedule, and is no longer referenced in the official rules described on the GSN website. The same month 100 Winners was canceled, Optimistic Entertainment, the co-producer of PlayMania Block, went into administration. It is unknown what impact, if any, this had on the PlayMania Block.

On June 26, 2007, PlayMania gave away its one millionth dollar. The winning contestant, Bernice, received a $500 bonus in addition to the $400 she had won playing, as well as a personalized plaque commemorating the achievement.

On July 17, 2007, the Tuesday edition of quiznation ceased airing. After September 2, 2007, the Sunday broadcast was removed as well, slightly over a year after it originally debuted.

quiznation aired its last episode on October 31, 2007. The network had made claims that it was improving upon its interactive participation for new concepts in the future, which came about with the premiere of GSN Live on February 25, 2008.

=== Hosts and guest hosts ===
The debut episodes of PlayMania were hosted by Mel Peachey, a host of the U.K. edition of Quiznation, and Shandi Finnessey, a co-host of the GSN game show Lingo. Peachey was originally scheduled to appear on US airwaves for only one month in order to introduce America to the unfamiliar "participation TV" format. However, she stayed through the entire run of PlayMania and hosted the two "PlayMania Block" shows, as well. Finnessey and Peachey were joined by host Jessica York on October 19, 2006. Peachey returned to England after hosting quiznation on April 7, 2007, her "goodbye show". Finnessey and York continued to appear on quiznation. After a week of eliminations, Angelle Tymon was introduced as Peachey's replacement on the "PlayMania Block" on April 21, 2007. A month later, the May 18 edition of quiznation featured the debut of The Price Is Right production coordinator Jeff Thisted as host.

In addition to the "official" hosts listed above, there have been several fill-in and guest hosts during PlayMania's run. Hannah Peckham hosted the June 15 and June 16 episodes in 2006, but did not become a permanent host. On two occasions, regulars from I've Got a Secret served as guest co-hosts in charge of viewer e-mail. Comedian Jermaine Taylor appeared on June 17, 2006, and Bil Dwyer appeared on June 22 of that year.

The PlayMania week of August 24, 2006, which featured a timeslot shift and the debut of a Sunday broadcast, was a "Winner's Weekend." This week featured puzzles about television to honor the 58th Annual Primetime Emmy Awards. As part of the theme, PlayMania held its own award ceremony, the "PlayMes", a parody of the Emmy Awards on the Sunday August 27 broadcast. Danny Bonaduce, then host of GSN's original game show Starface, appeared to present the awards. On that same night, $2,000 was given away to a caller named Julie, making her, at that time, the biggest PlayMania winner ever. (That record was later broken. The final record was set on the September 5, 2007 episode of quiznation by a caller named Teresa who won $4,700.)

== Games ==
PlayMania featured various mini-games that were played throughout the program. The rewards for the games were usually cash prizes ranging from $100–$500 in cash, sometimes reaching amounts as high as $2,000. Any games that were not completed before the end of a day's broadcast are normally carried over to the start of the next show.

During its ten-month run, the below twenty-one permanent games were played on the original PlayMania. Many carried over to be rotated on quiznation.

Game	How it is Played
Alphabuck$	Similar to Wheel of Fortune or Hangman, this game allows players to attempt to guess a letter that is in the puzzle of a given category. If the player's letters are in the puzzle, he/she will earn a small cash prize per letter, and receive an opportunity to guess the full puzzle. Correctly guessing the full puzzle earns the contestant an additional, larger cash prize.
Anagrams	A word, name or phrase with the letters mixed up will be given related to a specified category. The contestant must identify what the unscrambled phrase is.
Category Game	Three items or names, all in interlocking circles (a Venn diagram in which each circle intersects the other two, but all three never overlap), are listed. The contestant must identify what all of the items have in common in the most specific manner.
Conundrums	There are three variations on this game.: Rebus: The first variation is rebus-style. A sequence of letters and numbers will be side by side. Correctly saying the sounds in order will make it sound like a common phrase (e.g., "G R 8 S C AH T" would be "Great Scot"). The contestant must guess the common phrase.; Abbreviated Phrase: The second variation is an abbreviated phrase. A common phrase or movie title containing numbers and letters will be abbreviated to simply the numbers and first letters of important words (e.g., "12 D of C" would be "Twelve Days of Christmas"). The contestant must identify the phrase.
Crosswords	Similar to a crossword puzzle, Crosswords features four horizontal words with one letter in each word replaced with a question mark. Vertically, the letters behind the question marks make an actual word. The contestant must identify (and spell) the hidden word. The portion needed to be filled in may work with several choices; however, the host has an envelope containing the chosen word.
Find the Missing Letters	A five-letter word is given with two consecutive letters replaced by a question mark. The contestant must identify (and spell) the displayed word. The portion revealed may fit into multiple words; however, the host has an envelope containing the chosen word. Sometimes, a four-letter word is used instead of a five-letter word.
Lingo	Identical to the show of the same name, the object is to identify a five-letter word. The first letter is given, and as contestants continue to play, hints such as other letters in the word are given. The contestant must identify (and spell) the word.
Microcosm	A picture of an everyday object is shown with a part largely zoomed in and magnified. The contestant must identify what the item is.
Missing Link	A missing word precedes (or succeeds) three other words to form three separate a common words or phrases. The player must determine the missing word.
Movie Quotes / Television Quotes / Ad Slogans	Three quotes, each from a famous American film, television program, or advertising campaign, are listed, each with a cash prize beside it. The contestant must pick a quote and guess where it comes from.
Name the Catch Phrase	A rebus based on a popular, everyday phrase is given. (e.g., MEREPEAT would be "repeat after me", because the word "repeat" comes after the word "me.") The caller must identify what the "decoded" phrase is.
Name the Celebrity	A pixilated photograph of a celebrity is shown. The contestant must identify who the celebrity is.
Series Game	Three different series (which may be specially ordered numbers, letters, etc.) are shown, each with a cash value attached to it. The caller chooses one of the orders and must identify the next value.
Shrink 'N Scramble	Three different-sized words are listed, each with a cash prize attached to it. The object is to take one of the words and make a smaller word based on the length requirement given and the letters contained in that word. Each word may appear to have multiple answers; however, the host has an envelope containing the chosen word for each larger word. This game was replaced by Word Slam.
Things You'd Find...	The PlayMania crew picks three items you would commonly find in a designated location. The contestant must identify one of the items that would be found.
Top 5	Similar to Family Feud, a category is given. (e.g., "Top 5 Elton John Hits") The top five answers to the survey or fact-proven data are hidden, and it is the contestant's job to reveal one of them. Once all of the answers have been revealed, the game ends. A variation on a Top 5 is the PlayMania 5. The difference is that the PlayMania crew picks the five things on the list.
Twisted Title	A title of a movie is described using synonyms for the words in the title (e.g., Deceased Verse Writers Club would be Dead Poets Society). The contestant must identify the original title.
What's Missing?	A common symbol or image is shown, with an obvious part either missing or replaced with a question mark. The contestant must identify what should be in the image.
Word Cuts	A word that has been cut in half is displayed. The contestant must identify (and spell) the displayed word. The portion revealed may appear to be multiple words; however, the host has an envelope containing the chosen word.
Word $lam	Nine letters are listed in random order. Three three-letter words have been pre-chosen, each with a cash prize attached to it. The object is to take the nine letters and make a smaller word based on the length requirement given. Each word may appear to have multiple answers; however, the host has an envelope containing the chosen words. The game is also played with three different-sized word requirements, at three, five, and seven letters. This game has roots in the game Shrink 'N Scramble.

=== Special games ===
For a special occasion or promotional opportunity, PlayMania often engaged in special, personalized games. Some of these included the celebration of Mother's Day, the release of Horrorfest and even a Super Match-esque style game for the documentary, The Match Game Story: Behind the Blank .

=== Other features ===
During its original tenure (and carrying over to quiznation afterward), PlayMania involved a second interactive feature, e-mail. When new e-mail arrived, the active host was alerted via a sound effect. The host then walked over to the large plasma-screen monitor on the set and read e-mails from viewers while taking a break from talking to the audience during games. Since July 13, 2006, each episode has had a requested theme for e-mails. The tone of the e-mails varies widely, from serious to silly. The host may showcase graphics that viewers have sent with e-mails, including photographs and viewer-created art.

There were featured sponsors for a number of PlayMania episodes, usually during the first hour only. On some occasions — for instance, during the first month of the show when the main sponsor was Dick's Sporting Goods — items provided by the sponsor were given away in addition to or instead of cash prizes.

== PlayMania Block ==
PlayMania began to offer "new ways to play" on February 20, 2007. PlayMania expanded into the PlayMania Block, two separate shows under the PlayMania banner: 100 Winners and quiznation.

=== quiznation ===
Borrowing the title from its British predecessor, quiznation featured trivia, number, and word games with set cash prizes. The program aired from 12 midnight - 2 AM (EST) every Thursday through Saturday night (early Friday through early Sunday morning in the Eastern Time zone), but with the cancellation of 100 Winners, its final schedule was set at Wednesday through Saturday (technically early Thursday through early Sunday morning in the Eastern Time zone) quiznation's format was nearly identical to that of the PlayMania program. Its final episode was aired on October 31, 2007.

=== 100 Winners ===
100 Winners offered a contestant the chance to answer the on-screen game. If he or she answered correctly, he or she then chose one of one hundred safe deposit boxes on the set with a prize inside. The program aired from 12 midnight - 2 AM Eastern every Tuesday, Wednesday, and Sunday night (technically early Wednesday, Thursday, and Monday morning in the Eastern Time zone). Its final episode was aired on June 13, 2007.

== See also ==
- Midnight Money Madness
- Take the Cake
- Quiz channel
