= Miss USA 2004 =

53rd Miss USA pageant

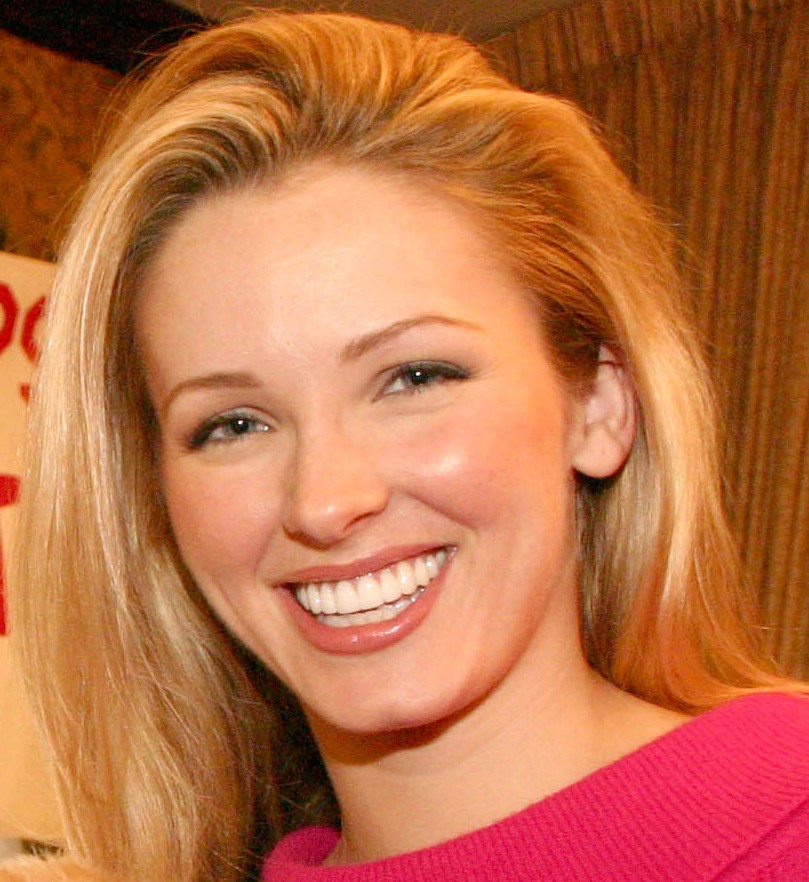
- Miss USA 2004 Shandi Finnessey
- Date: April 12, 2004
- Presenters: Billy Bush; Nancy O'Dell
- Venue: Kodak Theatre, Hollywood, California
- Broadcaster: NBC; KNBC-TV
- Entrants: 51
- Placements: 15
- Winner: Shandi Finnessey; Missouri

Miss USA 2004 was the 53rd Miss USA pageant, held at the Kodak Theatre in Hollywood, California on April 12, 2004. The winner of the beauty pageant was Shandi Finnessey, who became the first winner from the state of Missouri. The judges were racing driver Jeff Gordon, businessman Jerry Buss, basketball player John Salley, actor Mekhi Phifer, chef Rocco DiSpirito, and fashion designer Jill Stuart. Finnessey was crowned by outgoing Miss USA Susie Castillo, of Massachusetts.

Pageant co-owner Donald Trump opened the pageant by telling Castillo "You're fired", his catchphrase from his television program, The Apprentice. The pageant was hosted by Billy Bush and Nancy O'Dell. This was the first time this partnership had hosted the pageant. Bush had previously hosted Miss USA 2003 and Miss Universe 2003.

For the first time since 1970, fifteen semi-finalists competed in the final competition, although not all the semi-finalists competed in both the swimsuit and evening gown. Following the new format established at Miss Universe 2003 and Miss Teen USA 2003, the top fifteen semi-finalists were reduced to ten after the evening gown competition, and then to the final five after swimsuits. This was the first time that contestants did not have the opportunity to compete in both competitions. This was also for the first time since 1979 that the pageant took place in the month of April.

== Delegates ==
Rehearsing
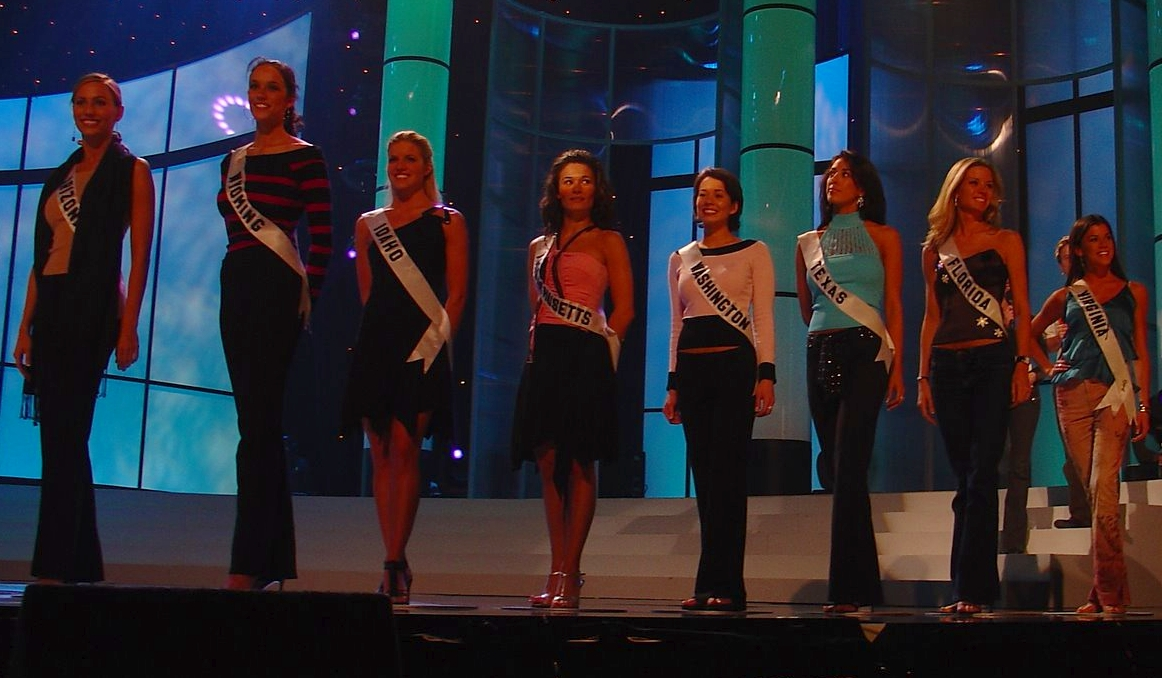
Miss USA contestants during rehearsals

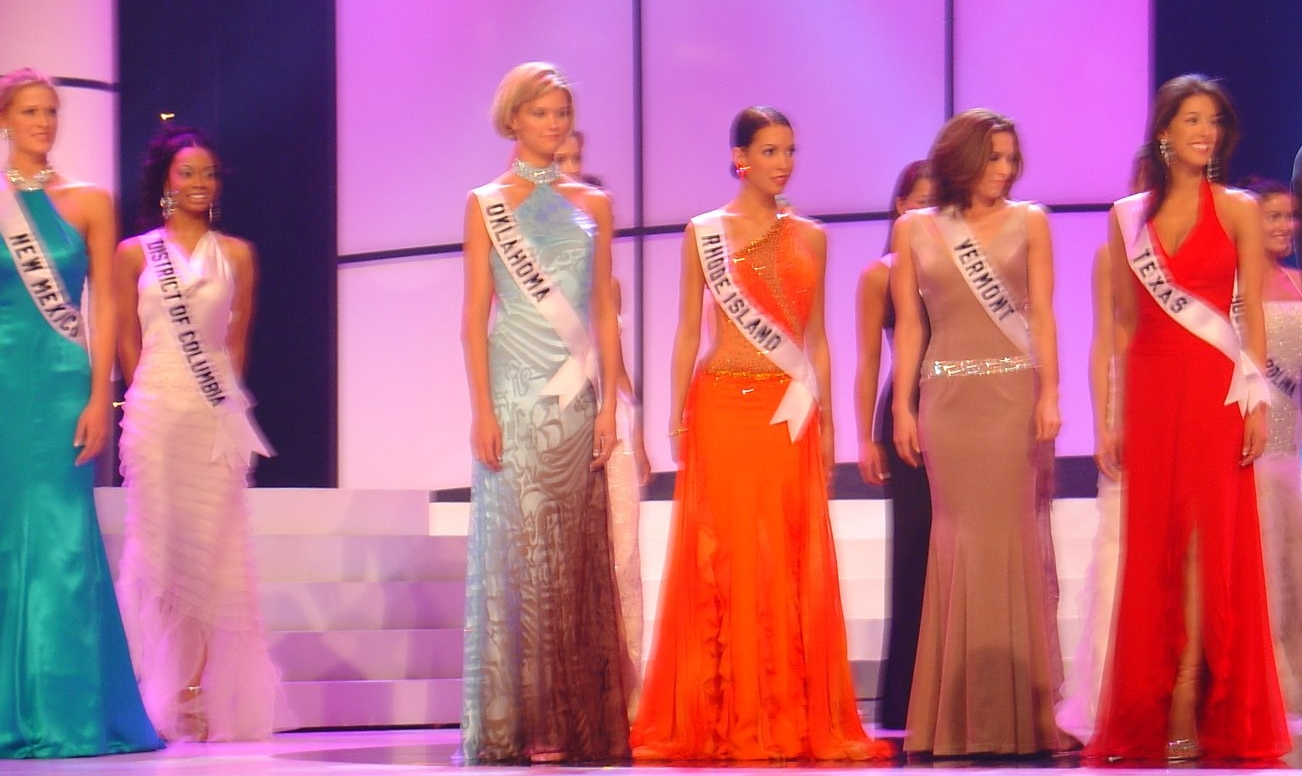
Miss USA contestants during rehearsals

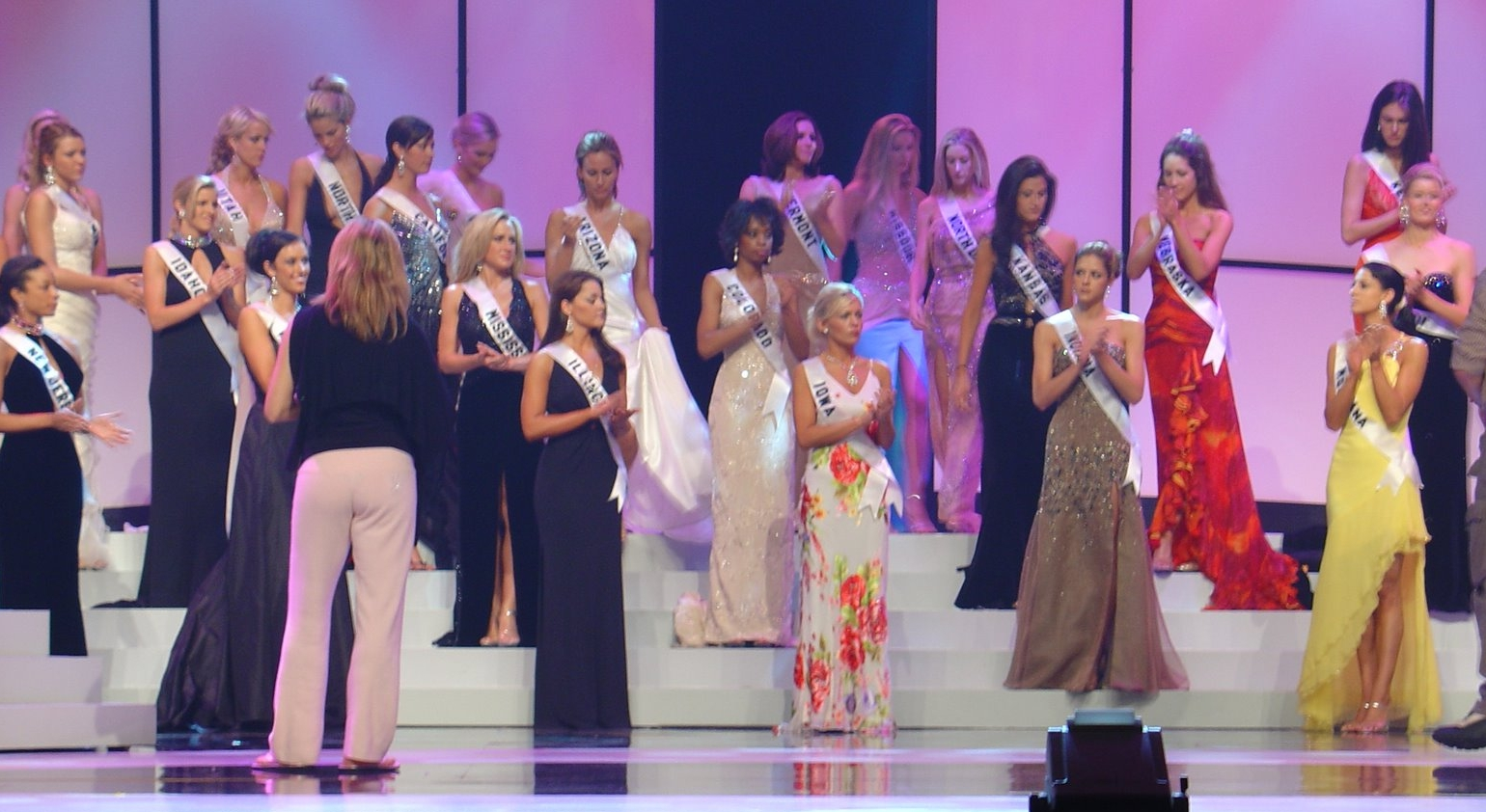
Miss USA contestants during rehearsals

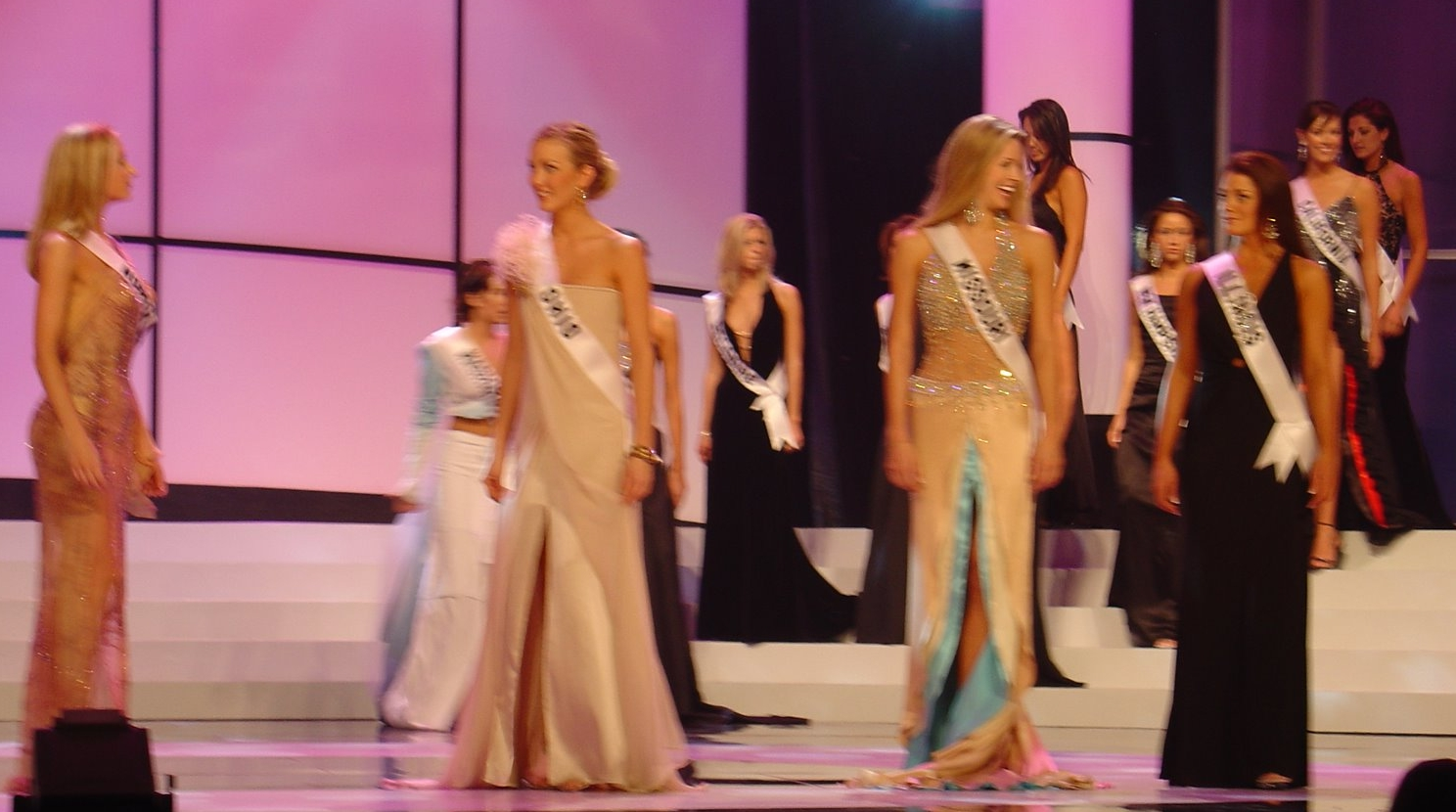
Miss USA contestants during rehearsals

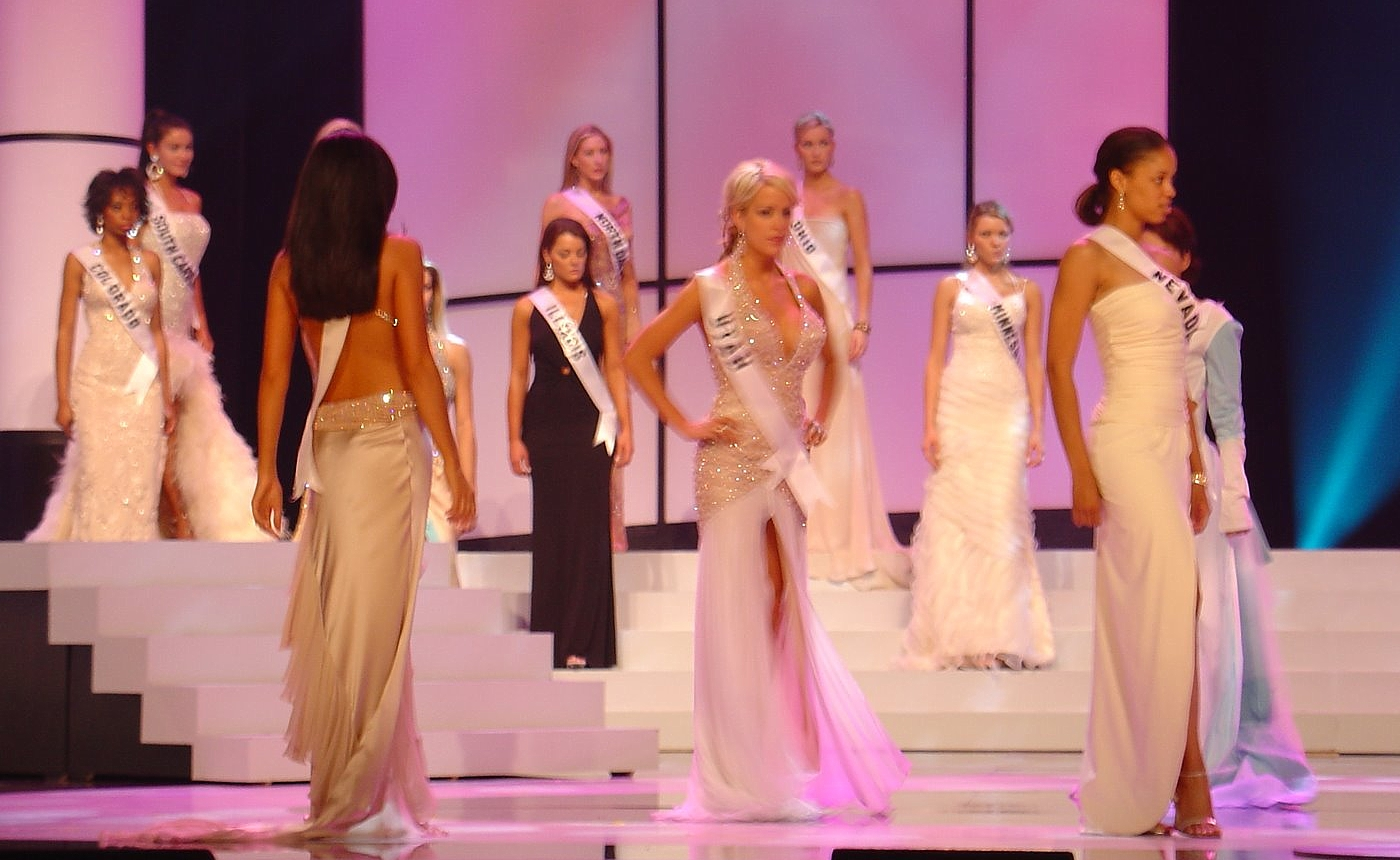
Miss USA contestants during rehearsals
