= List of programs broadcast by Game Show Network =

The following is a list of programs that are currently airing, upcoming, or were formerly broadcast by Game Show Network.

== Current programs ==
=== Original programs ===
Title	Premiere date	Current season/Total of seasons:
America Says	June 18, 2018	6

=== Reruns of ended original programs ===
Title	Premiere date	Final date
Chain Reaction (Lane)	August 1, 2006	June 20, 2022
Catch 21	July 21, 2008	January 21, 2020
Master Minds	April 6, 2020	November 21, 2023
Switch	January 30, 2023	July 16, 2024
Split Second (Higgins)	April 17, 2023	July 15, 2024
Beat the Bridge	June 10, 2024	July 1, 2025

=== Acquired programs ===
Title	Premiere date	Final date
25 Words or Less	September 16, 2019	present
Cash Cab (Bailey)	December 5, 2005	August 26, 2020
Celebrity Jeopardy! (Jennings)	September 27, 2023	present
Celebrity Wheel of Fortune (Sajak)	January 7, 2021	June 10, 2025
The Chase (Haines)	January 7, 2021	July 20, 2023
Deal or No Deal (NBC and CNBC versions)	December 19, 2005; December 3, 2018	May 18, 2009; August 7, 2019
Family Feud Favorites	September 15, 2025	present
Family Feud (Harvey)	September 13, 2010	present
Flip Side	September 9, 2024	present
The Floor	January 2, 2024	present
Jeopardy! (Trebek)	September 10, 1984	January 8, 2021
Match Game (Rayburn)	July 2, 1973	September 10, 1982
The Perfect Line	September 8, 2025	present
Press Your Luck (Banks)	June 12, 2019	present
The Wall	December 19, 2016	present
Weakest Link (Lynch)	September 9, 2020	present
Wheel of Fortune (Sajak and Seacrest)	December 28, 1981; September 9, 2024	June 7, 2024 present

== Upcoming programs ==
- 100 Choices (TBA)
- Balderdash (TBA)
- The Fast and The Curious (TBA)
- Riddiculous (TBA)
- Should I Stay or Should I Go? (TBA)

== Former programs ==
=== Former original programming ===
Title	Premiere Date & End Date	Years Rerun
1 vs. 100 (Inaba)	2010–11	2011–14
100 Winners	2007	
2009 Game Show Awards	2009	
20Q	2009	
50 Greatest Game Shows of All Time	2006	
Ace in the House	2007	
All New 3's a Crowd (Thicke)	1999–2000	2000–03
The American Bible Challenge	2012–14	
American Dream Derby	2005	
Annie Duke Takes on the World	2006	
Anything to Win	2006	
As Seen On...	1998–2000	
Aussie Millions	2010	
Baggage	2010–15	2015–19
Baggage First Dates	2011	
Baggage: Most Outrageous Moments	2015	
Baggage on the Road	2015	
Ballbreakers	2005–06	
Beat the Chefs	2012	
Best Ever Trivia Show	2019	2019–20
Big Bucks: The Press Your Luck Scandal	2003	2005
Big Saturday Night	2009	
Bingo America	2008–09	2009
Bingo Blitz (2009) (Note: A different format from the program of the same name that debuted in 2025.)	2009	
Bingo Blitz (2025)	2025	2025-26
Blank Slate	2024	
Burt Luddin's Love Buffet	1999–2001	
Camouflage (Lodge)	2007	2007–09
Carnie Wilson: Unstapled	2010	
Caroline & Friends	2018	2018–19
Caroline and Friends: The Game	2019	
Cat-Minster	2007	
Celebrities and Game Shows	2007	
Celebrity Blackjack	2004–05	
Chain Reaction (Catherwood)	2015–16	
The Chase (Burns)	2013–15	2015–22
The Chuck Barris Story: My Life on The Edge	2006	
Chuck Woolery: Naturally Stoned	2003	
Club A.M.	1994–97	
Common Knowledge	2019–21	2021–22, 2023–25
Cover Story	2018	
Cram	2003	
DJ Games		
Decades	1995–96	
Divided	2017–18	2018–22
Dog Park Superstars		
Doubles Poker Championship	2010	
Drew Carey's Improv-A-Ganza	2011	
Emogenius	2017–18	2018–21
Extreme Dodgeball	2004–05	
Extreme Gong	1998–99	
Fake-a-Date	2004	
Family Trade	2013	
Faux Pause	1998	
Foul Play	2003	
Friend or Foe?	2002–03	2008
Game Show Countdown: Top 10 Hosts	2007	
Game Show Flashback	2014	
Game Show Greatest Moments	2007	
Game Show Hall of Fame: Who Wants to Be a Millionaire	2007	
Games Across America	2004–05	
Gameworld	1997–98	
Get a Clue	2020–21	2021
Grand Slam	2007	
GSN Daily Draw (Trish Suhr)	2019	
GSN Live	2008–11	
GSN Radio (online only at GSN.com)	2008–09	
GSN Video Games (an hour block between gamer.tv and Game Sauce)	2003	
Hellevator	2015–16	
Hey Yahoo!	2023	
Hidden Agenda	2010	
High Stakes Poker	2006–07, 2009–11	
Hollywood Showdown	2000–01	2004–05
How Much Is Enough?	2008	
Idiotest	2014–17	2017–22
Inquizition	1998–2001	
Insider's Guide To Winning Game Show Millions	2007	
Instant Recall	2010	
It Takes a Church	2014–15	
I've Got a Secret (Dwyer)	2006	
Jep!	1998–2000	
Late Night Liars	2010	
Lie Detectors	2015	
The Line	2014	
Lingo (Woolery & Engvall)	2002–07, 2011	2007–16
Love Triangle	2011	2011–15
Lover's Lounge	2000–01	
The Making of The American Bible Challenge	2012	
The Making of a Game Show: Catch 21	2008	
Mall Masters	2001	
Man Versus Fly		
Mind of a Man	2014	
Million Dollar Poker Challenge		
Minute to Win It (Ohno)	2013–14	2015
The Money List	2009	
National Lampoon's Funny Money	2003	
National Lampoon's Greek Games	2004	
National Vocabulary Championship		
The Newlywed Game: A Silver Anniversary of Love and Laughter	1998	
The Newlywed Game (Wilson & Shepherd)	2009–13	2013–19
People Puzzler	2021–23	2023–25
Play It Back: (70's/80's/90's Game Shows)		
PlayMania	2006–07	
Poker Royale	2004–05	
Pokerstars/Pokerstars.net Caribbean Adventure		
Political Idiotest	2016	
Prime Games	1994–97	
The Pyramid (Richards)	2012	2012–17, 2020–21
Quiznation	2007	
Race for the Numbers	1994–98	
The Real Match Game Story: Behind the Blank		
Ridiculous Cash Bash		
Russian Roulette	2002–03	
Skin Wars	2014–16	
Skin Wars: Fresh Paint	2015–16	
Snap Decision	2017–19	2019–21
Starface	2006	2006–07
Steampunk'd	2015	
Super Decades	1997–98	
That's the Question	2006–07	
Think Like a Cat	2008	
Three Card Poker National Championship Tournament		
Throut and Neck	1999	
Tic-Tac-Dough (Burns)	2025	2025-26
Trivia Track	1997–98	
Tug of Words	2021–23	2023–24
Ultimatebet.net Aruba Classic		
Vegas Weddings Unveiled		
Video Game Invasion: The History of a Global Obsession		
Whammy! The All-New Press Your Luck	2002–03	2004–17, 2020–21
When Did That Happen?	1998–99	
Who Wants to be Governor of California – The Debating Game	2003	
Wide World of Games		
Win TV	1998–2000	
WinTuition	2002–03	
Window Warriors	2016	
Winsanity	2016–18	2018–22
Without Prejudice?	2007	
The Women Who Changed Gameshows		
Word Slam!		
World Blackjack Tour	2006	
World Poker Tour		
World Series of Blackjack	2004–07	
Worldwide Web Games		
You Win Live		

=== Former acquired programming ===
Title	Years Reran
The $1.98 Beauty Show	1994–2004, 2006
The $10,000 Pyramid	1998–2003
The $10,000 Sweep (unsold pilot)	1998
The $20,000 Pyramid	1998–2003
The $25,000 Pyramid (Clark)	1998–2018, 2022
The $100,000 Pyramid (Clark and Strahan)	1998–2014, 2022-24, 2024-26
1 vs. 100 (Saget)	2009–14
3's a Crowd (Peck)	1994–2007
All About Faces	1994
All About the Opposite Sex	1994
All Star Secrets	2014
The Amazing Race	2005–08
Are You Smarter than a 5th Grader? (FOX version)	2011–15
Aussie Millions	2010–11
Average Joe	2004–05
Babble (unsold pilot)	2014
Beat the Clock (Collyer, Narz, Wood, and Hall)	1994–2009
The Better Sex	1994, 1998
Blockbusters (Cullen and Rafferty)	1994–2009, 2013–14
Body Language (Kennedy)	1994–2009
Break the Bank (Kennedy and Barry)	1994–97
Bullseye (Lange)	1994–2007
Bumper Stumpers	1994–2000
Camouflage (Campbell)	1997–98
Card Sharks (Perry, Eubanks, Rafferty, and McHale)	1994–2018, 2022, 2023, 2024–25, 2025–26
Celebrity Charades	1997, 1999
Celebrity Family Feud (Roker)	2013
Celebrity Mole	2004
Chain Reaction (Cullen, Emmons, and Edwards)	1997–98
Child's Play	1994–2009
Choose Up Sides	2005, 2007
Click	1997–99
Cop-Out! (unsold pilot)	1997
Crosswits (Sparks)	2015
Dancing with the Stars (Bergeron)	2012
The Dating Game (Lange and Woolery)	1996–99, 2014
Deal or No Deal (Syndicated version)	2010–15
The Diamond Head Game	1994–2000
Dog Eat Dog (Burns)	2004–09, 2012–15
Dollar a Second (Eubanks, unsold pilot)	2000
Double Dare (Trebek)	1994–2008
Double Talk	1998
Eye Guess	1998
The Face Is Familiar	1998
Family Challenge	1999
Family Feud (Dawson, Combs, Anderson, Karn, and O'Hurley)	1994–2016, 2018, 2022
Fantasy	1994–97
The Fun Factory	1997
Funny You Should Ask	2022–23
The Game Game	
Game Show Moments Gone Bananas	2006, 2013
Get the Message	2007
Get Rich Quick! (unsold pilot)	1998
Go	1997–98
The Gong Show (Barris)	1994–99
Greed	2002–07
He Said, She Said	
Headline Chasers	1998
Hold Everything!	
Hollywood Connection	
Hollywood Game Night (Lynch)	2017
Hollywood Squares (Marshall and Bergeron)	1999–2006, 2009–11
Hot Potato	
I've Got a Secret (Moore and Allen)	1994–2008, Shown for 2 weeks in December since 2009
It's News to Me	2009
Jackpot	
Jeopardy! (Fleming and Jennings)	1999, 2025–26
Joker! Joker!! Joker!!!	
The Joker's Wild (Barry and Cullen)	
Judge for Yourself	
Junior Partner Pyramid	
The Junior Pyramid	
Juvenile Jury	1997–98
Kenny vs. Spenny	
Let's Ask America (Pereira)	
Let's Make a Deal (Hall)	1994–2009, 2017–18
Love Connection (Woolery)	2003–08
Make the Connection	
Match Game (Shafer, Convy [pilot], Burger, and Baldwin)	1994–2005, 2012, 2015, 2024–25, 2025–26
Million Dollar Password	2010–13
Minute to Win It (Fieri)	2012–15, 2016–17
The Mole	
Monday Night Quarterback (unsold pilot)	1998
The Name's the Same	
The Newlywed Game (Eubanks and Lange)	
Next Action Star	2004
Now You See It (Narz)	1994–99, 2007–09
Number Please	2006
The Parent Game	1997–99
Pass the Buck	
Password (Ludden)	1994–2010
Password Plus (Ludden, Cullen, and Kennedy)	1994–2014, 2022
The Perfect Match (Enberg)	
Personality	1998
Person, Place or Thing	2023–24
Play the Percentages	
Play Your Hunch	2007
Power of 10	2011
Press Your Luck (Tomarken)	2001–09, 2012–18, 2022
The Price Is Right (Cullen, Barker, James & Kennedy)	1995–2000
Pyramid (Osmond)	2008–12
Quiz Kids Challenge	
The Riddlers (two pilots aired)	1998
Rock & Roll Jeopardy!	
Ruckus	1997, 1999
Sale of the Century (Perry)	2013–15
Says Who? (unsold pilot)	1998
Scare Tactics (Morgan)	2016
Second Guessers (unsold pilot)	1998
Shoot for the Stars (pilot entitled Shoot The Works)	1998
Shop 'til You Drop (Finn)	2013–15
Show Me the Money	2007
Spy TV	
Star Search (Hall)	2004–05
Storybook Squares	2002
Street Smarts (Nicotero)	2004–06
Super Jeopardy!	1998
Super Password	1994–2014, 2022
Tattletales	1994–2003, 2006–09
Tic-Tac-Dough (Martindale and Caldwell)	1994–2003, 2007–09, 2025
To Tell the Truth (Collyer, Moore, Garagiola, Ward, Elliott, Swann, Trebek, and O'Hurley)	1994–2009, 2014, 2022
Treasure Hunt (Edwards)	1994–98, 2006–08
Trivia Trap	1994–2004, 2006–08
TV's Funniest Game Show Moments	2014, 2018
Twenty One (Povich)	2003–08
Twisters (unsold pilot)	1998
Two for the Money	
Weakest Link (Robinson and Gray)	2002–10
What's Going On?	2006–07
What's My Line? (Daly, Bruner, and Blyden)	1994–2009 Shown for 2 weeks in December since 2009
What's My Line? at 25	2014
Wheel 2000	1998–2001
Wheel of Fortune (Woolery)	2007
Who Dares Wins (Australian game show)	
Who Wants to Be a Millionaire (Philbin, Vieira, and Harrison)	2003–12, 2017–18, 2023–26
Who Wants to Be a Super Millionaire?	2005–07
Wild Animal Games	1999
Win Ben Stein's Money	2004–06
Win, Lose or Draw (Convy)	2002–04
Winner Take All	
Winning Streak	1998
