= National Bingo Night (American game show) =

- Created by: Andrew Glassman
- Presented by: Ed Sanders
- Country of origin: United States
- Original language: English
- No. of seasons: 1
- No. of episodes: 6

Production
- Running time: 60 minutes
- Production company: Glassman Media

Original release
- Network: ABC
- Release: May 18 – June 22, 2007

National Bingo Night is an American game show hosted by Ed Sanders which premiered on ABC on May 18, 2007, with a six-episode order. Sanders is known for his work on another ABC show, Extreme Makeover: Home Edition. The show was cancelled by ABC and was repackaged as Bingo America on GSN, first hosted by Patrick Duffy, and in October 2008 by Richard Karn.

The creator of this program, Andrew Glassman, also created the reality television game Average Joe.

The game is an interactive experience for both the studio audience and viewers at home. On NBN, members of the studio audience attempted to win a game of bingo while competing with a solo studio contestant. For Bingo America, it is played as a straight general knowledge quiz format with two players and a home viewer bingo game within.

Home viewers play along with pre-printed game cards that are available from the network website just before each episode airs, and are also eligible to win prizes.

The show was expected to return for a five-episode run during the week of December 17, 2007, but on November 13, 2007, ABC decided to replace it instead with its new game show, Duel. In 2008, the show was cancelled and was afterward shopped to other networks. Eventually GSN acquired the rights and the game was repackaged into a five-day-a-week 30-minute version with modifications listed below.

== Gameplay ==
=== National Bingo Night ===
Each hour-long episode of NBN was divided into three games – Red, White, and Blue. Only cards with the correct designation were eligible to win prizes. Unlike the audience members, studio contestants did not actually have a bingo card. Instead, they participated in stunt games. During these games, they took guesses on what the next ball to be drawn from an oversized bingo drum will be. Generally, this took the form of odd or even, red or black numbers (originally red or black decals on the balls), or whether the next number is higher or lower than the previous one.

On at least two occasions, the stunt was to draw balls that contained a certain number, such as five 5's ("High Five"; drawing G-55 would count for two 5's) or four 9's ("Baseball")

If the contestant successfully completes the stunt before anyone in the studio audience gets a bingo, the contestant wins one of various prizes. If not, then an audience member wins $5,000 (or a prize the studio contestant failed to win on at least one occasion). In the event that the in-studio contestant completes their game and an audience member gets a bingo, only the audience member wins.

All games were winner-take-all. Non-winning contestants received nothing.

=== Bingo America ===
The format was later retooled as Bingo America and aired new episodes on GSN from March 31, 2008 to January 2, 2009. In the new format, two contestants competed on each show for a top prize of $100,000. The new version also included an at-home element in which viewers had the chance to win prizes.
