= Barbara Paul =

American novelist (1931–2022)

- Born: Barbara Jeanne Traber; June 5, 1931; Maysville, Kentucky, U.S.
- Died: June 6, 2022 (aged 91)
- Occupations: Novelist, actress, college professor
- Website: www.barbarapaul.com

Barbara Jeanne Paul (June 5, 1931 – June 6, 2022), born Barbara Jeanne Traber, also known as Bobbie White, was an American college professor, actress, theatre director, and writer of detective stories and science fiction, born in Kentucky. She taught at the University of Pittsburgh, Berry College and Erskine College. Several of her stories have been the basis of television movies or episodes.

== Early life and education ==
Paul was born in Maysville, Kentucky in 1931, the daughter of Henry Kenneth Traber and Evelyn White Traber. She was raised by her grandparents Duke White and Florence Snapp White. She graduated from Bowling Green State University in 1953. She earned a master's degree from the University of Redlands in 1957, and completed doctoral studies in theatre at the University of Pittsburgh in 1969. Her dissertation was titled Form and Fomula; A study of Philip Massinger's tragic structure. She also studied at Southern Illinois University, and on fellowships in Oslo and Vienna.

== Career ==
Paul taught at the University of Pittsburgh, at Berry College in Georgia and at Erskine College in South Carolina. She was also drama director at Erskine College. She was a house matron and acted in several productions in 1962 at the University of Southern Mississippi's summer theatre program.

Paul wrote more than twenty novels, in the science fiction, horror, and mystery genres. Several of her novels focus on a policewoman character, Marian Larch. She also wrote stories, and reviewed books for the Pittsburgh Press. A number of her novels feature in-jokes: for example Full Frontal Murder borrows various names from the British TV series Blake's 7. One of her stories was the basis of Dream Girl, an episode of Tales from the Darkside (1986); and her novel Kill Fee (1985) was adapted into the television movie Murder C.O.D. (1990), starring Patrick Duffy. Her 1990 novel In-laws and Outlaws was adapted for a German television movie in 1997.

Paul had a son, Kenneth. She died in 2022, at the age of 91.

== Publications ==
=== Science fiction novels ===
- An Exercise for Madmen (1978)
- Pillars of Salt (1978)
- Bibblings (1979)
- Under the Canopy (1980)
- The Three-Minute Universe (1988) (a Star Trek novel)

=== Mystery novels ===
- The Fourth Wall (1979)
- Liars and Tyrants and People Who Turn Blue (1980)
- First Gravedigger (1980)
- Your Eyelids Are Growing Heavy (1981)
- The Renewable Virgin (1984)
- Kill Fee (1985)
- A Cadenza for Caruso (1984)
- Prima Donna at Large (1985)
- But He Was Already Dead When I Got There (1986)
- A Chorus of Detectives (1987)
- He Huffed and He Puffed (1989)
- Good King Sauerkraut (1989)
- In-laws and Outlaws (1990) (Later adapted into a 1997 TV-film Der Tusel der Furcht)
- You Have the Right To Remain Silent (1992)
- The Apostrophe Thief (1993)
- Fare Play (1995)
- Full Frontal Murder (1997)

=== Stories ===
- Jack Be Quick and Other Crime Stories (1999)
