= Face au Mur =

- Genre: Game show
- Based on: The Wall by: Andrew Glassman; LeBron James
- Directed by: Jean-Marc Létourneau
- Presented by: Maripier Morin
- Theme music composer: Michael Lord
- Opening theme: "Behind the Wall"
- Ending theme: "Wall of Will" and "Trophies"
- Composer: Michael Lord
- Country of origin: Canada
- Original language: French
- No. of seasons: 1
- No. of episodes: 10

Production
- Executive producers: Dominique Joly; Nathalie Laburge; Jean-Marc Létourneau
- Production locations: TVA Studios; Montreal, Quebec
- Running time: 65-66 minutes
- Production companies: TVA Productions II Inc. Deux L Productions

Original release
- Network: TVA
- Release: January 18 – March 22, 2018

Related
- The Wall (U.S. Version)

Face au mur (Facing the Wall) is a Canadian game show which premiered on January 18, 2018 on TVA. The show, an adaptation of the American game show The Wall and a Tagline in France, is hosted by Québécois host Maripier Morin. The show ran for one season and the main sponsors are Vidéotron and Nissan.

== Gameplay ==
The Wall is a four-story-tall (12m) pegboard, similar to a pachinko game or bean machine; it also is similar to the Plinko board used for the pricing game of the same name on Price Is Right: À vous de jouer. The bottom of the board is divided into 15 slots marked with various canadian dollar amounts; eight of these range from $1 to $100 and remain constant throughout the game, while the others have higher values and increase from round to round. Seven numbered "drop zones" are centred at the top of the board (above the centre seven slots), from which balls can be dropped into play.

A team of two contestants plays each game, with a potential top prize of $2,599,994 and a special gift prize of 2018 Nissan Qashqai (if top prize of $2,399,995). Green balls dropped on the board will add to the team's bank, while red balls dropped on the board will subtract from it. Throughout the game, the bank has a floor of $0.

=== Round 1: Free Fall ===
In Free Fall, the team is asked a series of five questions, each with two answer choices. As each question is asked, three balls are simultaneously released from drop zones 1, 4, and 7. The team must select one answer and lock it in before any portion of a ball crosses the threshold of a money slot. If the team's answer is correct, the balls turn green and their values are added to the team's bank. If the team answers incorrectly or fails to lock in an answer, the balls turn red and their values are subtracted from the team's bank.

If the team's bank balance is zero at the end of this round, the game is over and they leave without any winnings. If not, their earnings become part of a guaranteed payout to be offered to them at the end of the game. The highest amount that a team can bank in this round is $150,000.

The values on the board range from $1 to $10,000, and are arranged as follows:

$1	$2,000	$100	$8,000	$10	$4,000	$1	$10,000	$1	$4,000	$10	$8,000	$100	$2,000	$1

=== Round 2 ===
At the start of the second round, the contestants are separated from each other for the remainder of the game. One enters an isolation chamber behind The Wall, while the other remains onstage. Two green balls are played simultaneously, dropped from zones chosen by the onstage player. Three multiple-choice questions are then played, each with three answer choices. The onstage player is shown only the answers to each question, and must decide which zone to use, based on how confident he/she is that the isolated player can answer correctly. The question and answers are then presented to the isolated player; after he/she responds, the ball is dropped from the chosen zone. A correct answer turns the ball green and adds the value of the slot it lands in to the team bank, while a miss turns the ball red and deducts the value. The isolated player is not told which of his/her answers are correct or given any information on the team bank.

The onstage player is offered an opportunity to "Double Up" on the second question and "Triple Up" on the third; these options allow him/her to play two or three balls from the selected drop zone instead of one, respectively.

After the third question, if the banked total is at least $3 (as the least that could be lost from two red balls is $2), two red balls are dropped simultaneously from the same zones that were chosen for the initial two green balls. The maximum amount that a team can bank in this round is $399,998.

The values on the board range from $1 to $50,000, and are arranged as follows:

$1	$1,000	$100	$2,000	$10	$5,000	$1	$10,000	$1	$20,000	$10	$25,000	$100	$50,000	$1

=== Round 3 ===
Gameplay proceeds as in Round 2, but each of the three questions now has four answer choices. In addition, four green and four red balls are played at the start and end of the round respectively, and are dropped one at a time, rather than simultaneously. The "Double Up" and "Triple Up" options are available as before.

The maximum amount that a team can bank in this round is $1,999,996 and a special gift prize is the 2018 Nissan Qashqai (if the total of $1,799,997).

The values on the board range from $1 to $200,000 with 1 NISSAN, and are arranged as follows from Episode 1 to 6 (4 Green balls only):

$1	$10,000	$100	$20,000	$10	$40,000	1 NISSAN	$60,000	$1	$80,000	$10	$100,000	$100	$200,000	$1

The values on the board range from $1 to $200,000 without 1 NISSAN, and are arranged as follows:

$1	$10,000	$100	$20,000	$10	$40,000	$1	$60,000	$1	$80,000	$10	$100,000	$100	$200,000	$1

=== Final Decision ===
After the third question in Round 3, the isolated player is sent a contract by the host, and he/she must sign it or tear it up. Signing the contract gives up the team bank in favour of a guaranteed payout, equal to the Free Fall winnings plus an additional $5,000 for every question answered correctly in Rounds 2 and 3. If the isolated player tears up the contract, the team receives their final bank total instead. After the four red balls have dropped in Round 3 and the final bank is calculated (or after the last question if there is less than $4 banked), the isolated player returns to the stage to reveal his/her decision. Only at this point does he/she learn the number of correct answers given, the payout total, and the team's final bank.

The maximum possible guaranteed payout is $180,000, obtained by scoring $150,000 in Free Fall and answering all questions correctly in Rounds 2 and 3. The maximum possible bank total is $2,599,994 ($2,399,995 with Nissan Qashqai), obtained by answering every question correctly, using every Double Up and Triple Up option, having every green ball drop into the highest-valued slot, and having the six mandatory red balls each drop into a $1 slot.

== Episodes ==
Color key

The contestants left with at least $200,000.
The contestants left with at least $200,000 with Nissan Qashqai.
The contestants left with the larger possible amount.
The contestants left with the larger possible amount with Nissan Qashqai.
The contestants left with the smaller possible amount.
The contestants left with the smaller possible amount with Nissan Qashqai.
The contestants left with nothing.
The contestants left with Nissan Qashqai.

Episode	Contestants	Guaranteed Payout Contract			Final Bank Total	Contract Decision
Episode	Contestants	Free Fall Bank	Correct Answers (Bonus)	Total Offer	Final Bank Total	Contract Decision
1	David and Lucien	$42,121	5 ($25,000)	$67,121	$137,231	Rejected
2	Yohann and Marie-Michèle	$32,202	4 ($20,000)	$52,202	$0	Accepted
3	Josèe and Hugo	$22,201	3 ($15,000)	$37,201	$190,110	Accepted
4	Julie and Jean-Philippe	$20,323	2 ($10,000)	$30,323	$0	Rejected
5	Cathy and Mèlaine	$26,306	4 ($20,000)	$46,306	$231,304	Rejected
6	Ernest and Dave	$38,301	3 ($15,000)	$53,301	$0	Accepted
7	Katheryne and Valérie	$20,302	4 ($20,000)	$40,302	$362,180	Rejected
8	Lynda-Marie and Genevieve	$54,232	2 ($10,000)	$64,232	$0	Accepted
9	Manon and Nabila	$32,305	2 ($10,000)	$42,305	$0	Rejected
10	Rafaëlle and Maude	$16,326	6 ($30,000)	$46,326	$444,448	Rejected

== See also ==
The Wall NBC's Game show hosted by Chris Hardwick
