= A Fal =

Hungarian television game show

- Genre: Game show
- Based on: The Wall by: Andrew Glassman; LeBron James
- Presented by: Balázs Sebestyén
- Theme music composer: Michael Lord
- Composer: Michael Lord
- Country of origin: Hungary
- Original language: Hungarian
- No. of seasons: 2
- No. of episodes: 54

Production
- Executive producer: Réka Benyovszky
- Running time: 45-50 minutes
- Production companies: Glassman Media; SpringHill Entertainment; CORE Media Group

Original release
- Network: RTL Klub
- Release: 19 November 2017 – 8 June 2018

A Fal (Hungarian for The Wall) is a game show broadcast on Hungarian television station RTL Klub. It is affiliated with the U.S. game show The Wall.

The eponymous wall is a five-story-tall pegboard, similar to a pachinko game or bean machine; it also is similar to the Plinko board used for that pricing game of the same name on The Price Is Right. The bottom of the board is divided into 15 slots marked with various Hungarian forint amounts, some of which increase as the game progresses. Seven numbered "drop zones" are centered at the top of the board (above the center seven slots), from which balls can be dropped into play.

A team of two contestants plays each game, with a potential top prize of 100,000,000 Ft. Green balls dropped on the board will add to the team's bank, while red balls dropped on the board will subtract from it. Throughout the game, the bank has a floor of 0 Ft.

Money/Parts	1.	2,	3.	4.	5.	6.	7.	8.	9.	10.	11.	12.	13.	14.	15.
1. Round	10	10.000	1000	100.000	100	40.000	10	220.000	10	40.000	100	100.000	1000	20.000	10
2. Round	10	20.000	1000	40.000	100	80.000	10	160.000	10	320.000	100	640.000	1000	2.2 MILLION	10
3. Round	10	200.000	1000	400.000	100	800.000	10	1.6 MILLION	10	2.2 MILLION	100	3 MILLION	1000	8 MILLION	10

Episode	Contestants	Total offer	Final Bank Total	Contract Decision	Broadcast
1.R*	Zsuzsa and Péter	749.140 Ft	13.518.140 Ft	Rejected	November 19, 2017
2.R*	Bori and Attila	790.000 Ft	9.341.280 Ft	Accepted	December 2, 2017
1.	Kata and Luca	800.020 Ft	4.617.740 Ft	Rejected	February 5, 2018
2.	Kata and Bence	1.290.130 Ft	10.157.380 Ft	Accepted	February 6, 2018
3.	Anita and Gyöngyi	800.110 Ft	0 Ft	Rejected	February 7, 2018
4.	Anita and István	672.260 Ft	14.199.870 Ft	Rejected	February 8, 2018
5.	Dóra and Zsolt	1.091.010 Ft	0 Ft	Rejected	February 9, 2018
6.	Ármin and Kristóf	1.771.330 Ft	7.722.420 Ft	Rejected	February 12, 2018
7.	Tímea and Fruzsina	1.932.410 Ft	0 Ft	Rejected	February 13, 2018
8.	Fanni and Domonkos	1.563.220 Ft	7.475.110 Ft	Rejected	February 14, 2018
9.	Henrietta and Gyuri	1.151.220 Ft	221.420 Ft	Rejected	February 15, 2018
10.	Györgyi and Andi	1.480.260 Ft	0 Ft	Rejected	February 16, 2018
11.	Renáta and Ferenc	1.413.100 Ft	3.601.090 Ft	Rejected	February 19, 2018

The contestants won more than 8 million Ft
The contestants left with the larger possible amount
The contestants left with the smaller possible amount
The contestants left with nothing at all.

R*: The first and second broadcast recorded in Milan.

== Seasons ==
Seasons	Season opening	Season closing	Host	Episodes	Original channel
"Test transmission"	19 November 2017	2 December 2017	Balázs Sebestyén	2	RTL Klub
1.	5 February 2018	23 March 2018	Balázs Sebestyén	33	RTL Klub
2.	14 May 2018	8 June 2018	Balázs Sebestyén	19	RTL Klub
