= The Wall (American game show) =

American game show

- Genre: Game show
- Created by: Andrew Glassman; LeBron James
- Developed by: Andrew Glassman; LeBron James; Maverick Carter
- Directed by: Alan Carter; Michael Dempsey
- Presented by: Chris Hardwick
- Opening theme: "Behind the Wall"
- Ending theme: "Wall of Will" and "Trophies"
- Composer: Michael Lord
- Country of origin: United States
- Original language: English
- No. of seasons: 6
- No. of episodes: 99

Production
- Executive producers: Chris Hardwick; LeBron James; Andrew Glassman; Maverick Carter
- Production locations: Warner Bros. Studios, Burbank, California (2016–2018); Universal Studios, Universal City, California (2018–present)
- Camera setup: Multi-camera
- Running time: 42–44 minutes
- Production companies: SpringHill Entertainment; Glassman Media; CORE Media Group

Original release
- Network: NBC
- Release: December 19, 2016 – present

The Wall is an American television game show airing on NBC, which premiered on December 19, 2016. The show is hosted by Chris Hardwick, who also serves as executive producer on the show along with LeBron James, Maverick Carter, and Andrew Glassman.

In 2018, NBC announced plans for a Spanish-language version of The Wall, which premiered in January 2020 on their Telemundo Spanish-language network with Marco Antonio Regil hosting.

== Broadcast ==
Two special episodes aired on November 22, 2017 and December 27, 2017. A special Christmas themed episode aired on December 4, 2017. The second half of the second season premiered on January 1, 2018. Season 3 premiered on March 15, 2020. After going on a brief hiatus in July 2020, new episodes resumed broadcast on September 24, 2020. On September 30, 2020, the series was renewed for a fourth season of 20 episodes. The fourth season premiered on January 4, 2021. A special Tokyo 2020 Olympics episode aired to raise money for the Team USA fund on February 22, 2021. A special Red Nose Day episode aired on May 27, 2021. After going on a brief hiatus in September 2021, new episodes resumed broadcast on November 12, 2021. The fifth season premiered on April 11, 2023. After going on hiatus in December 2023, new episodes of the fifth season resumed July 1, 2024.

On November 12, 2025, it was announced that The Wall had been renewed for a sixth season, which premiered on January 5, 2026.

== Gameplay ==
The Wall is a four-story tall (40 ft) pegboard, similar to a pachinko game or bean machine; it also is similar to the board used for the Plinko pricing game on The Price Is Right. The bottom of the board is divided into 15 slots marked with various dollar amounts, alternating between low and high values. The eight low values range from $1 to $100 and remain constant throughout the game, while the seven high values are $5,000 or more and increase from round to round. Balls can be put into play from seven numbered "drop zones" on the top edge of the board, directly above the seven centermost money slots.

A team of two contestants plays each game, attempting to bank as much money as possible by answering questions correctly and landing balls in high-value slots. Green balls add the values in which they land to the team's bank, while red balls deduct theirs. Throughout the game, the bank has a floor of $0.

=== Round 1: Free Fall ===
In Free Fall, the team is asked a series of five questions, each with two answer choices. As each question is asked, three balls are simultaneously released, one apiece from drop zones 1, 4, and 7. The team must select one answer and lock it in before any ball crosses the threshold of a money slot. Once the balls have landed, they turn green for a correct answer, or red for a miss or failure to lock in a choice in time.

If the team's bank balance is zero at the end of this round, the game ends immediately and they leave without any winnings. Otherwise, their earnings become part of a guaranteed payout to be offered to them at the end of the game.

Starting with Season 4, the team may choose to double the total value of any one question by pressing a gold "Free Fall Plus" disk while the balls are falling.

The highest amount that a team can bank in round 1 is $375,000 in the first three seasons; this was later increased to $450,000 for the fourth season.

The values on the board range from $1 to $25,000, and are arranged as follows:

$1	$5,000	$100	$20,000	$10	$10,000	$1	$25,000	$1	$10,000	$10	$20,000	$100	$5,000	$1

=== Round 2 ===
At the start of the second round, the team chooses one member to enter an isolation chamber for the rest of the game, while the other remains onstage. The audio/video signals from the chamber can be transmitted to the studio, to present the isolated player's deliberations, or cut off as needed. A set number of green balls are played simultaneously at the beginning of the round. Three multiple-choice questions are then played, each with three answer choices. The onstage player is shown only the answers to each question and must decide which drop zone to use, based on how confident they are that the isolated player can answer correctly. The question and answers are then presented to the isolated player. After they respond, the ball turns green for a correct answer or red for a miss, and is then dropped from the chosen zone. The isolated player is not told which of their answers are correct or given any information on the team bank until they are brought out of isolation near the end of the game.

The onstage player is offered an opportunity to "Double Up" on the second question and "Triple Up" on the third. These options allow the onstage player to play two or three balls from the selected drop zone instead of one, respectively. After the third question, if the banked total is at least $1 more than the number of green balls played at the start of the round, an equal number of red balls are played simultaneously from the same zones; if not, the bank is automatically reset to $0.

In the first two seasons, two initial green balls were played from different zones chosen by the onstage player, and a team could bank up to $1,999,998. Beginning with the third season, seven initial green balls are played in a "SuperDrop," one from every zone, and a team could bank up to $3,249,993. The maximum slot value was reduced from $250,000 to $150,000 at the beginning of the fourth season, lowering the potential total for this round to $1,949,993.

Starting in the fifth season, the contestant is given an additional "Wall to Wall" option on the third question, allowing them to play seven balls as in the SuperDrop. The maximum that can be banked in this round is thus increased to $2,549,993.

The values on the board range from $1 to $250,000 (later $150,000) and are arranged as follows:

$1	$5,000	$100	$10,000	$10	$25,000	$1	$50,000	$1	$100,000 $75,000	$10	$125,000 $100,000	$100	$250,000 $150,000	$1

=== Round 3 ===
Gameplay proceeds as in Round 2, but each of the three questions now has four answer choices. In addition, four green and four red balls are played at the start and end of the round respectively, and are dropped one at a time, rather than simultaneously. The "Double Up" and "Triple Up" options are available as before. The maximum amount that a team can bank in this round is $9,999,996.

The values on the board range from $1 to $1 million, and are arranged as follows:

$1	$50,000	$100	$100,000	$10	$200,000	$1	$300,000	$1	$400,000	$10	$500,000	$100	$1,000,000	$1

=== Final Decision ===
After the third question in Round 3, the isolated player is sent a contract by the host and must decide to either sign it or tear it up. Signing the contract gives up the team bank in favor of a guaranteed payout, equal to the Free Fall winnings plus an additional $20,000 for every question answered correctly in Rounds 2 and 3. Tearing up the contract or returning it unsigned awards the team their final bank total. If the bank contains at least $5, the four red balls are played once the isolated player returns the contract, from the same zones and in the same order as the four green ones at the beginning of Round 3. If the bank contains $4 or less, it is set to zero and the red balls are skipped. The isolated player then returns to the stage to reveal their decision; only at this point do they learn the number of correct answers given, the payout total, and the team's final bank.

The maximum possible guaranteed payout in the first two seasons is $495,000, obtained by scoring $375,000 in Free Fall and answering all six questions correctly in Rounds 2 and 3. The maximum possible bank total in the first two seasons is $12,374,994, obtained by answering every question correctly, using every Double Up and Triple Up option, having every green ball drop into the highest-valued slot, and having the six mandatory red balls each drop into a $1 slot. In the third season, the maximum possible total is $13,624,989 due to the increased number of mandatory green and red balls in Round 2. For the fourth season, the maximum payout and bank totals are $570,000 and $12,399,989, respectively, achieved through use of the double-value option in Free Fall, and the reduced maximum slot value in Round 2. With the introduction of the "Wall to Wall" option in the fifth season, the maximum bank total is $12,999,989.

== Episodes ==
Season	Episodes	Originally released	
Season	Episodes	First released	Last released
1	10	December 19, 2016	February 21, 2017
2	20	May 8, 2017	February 5, 2018
3	19	March 15, 2020	October 28, 2020
4	20	January 4, 2021	February 1, 2022
5	20	April 11, 2023	September 9, 2024
6	TBA	January 5, 2026	TBA

Color key
The contestants won at least $1,000,000.
The contestants left with the larger possible amount.
The contestants left with the smaller possible amount.
The contestants left with nothing at all.

=== Season 1 ===
Episode	Contestants	Guaranteed payout contract			Final bank total	Contract decision
Episode	Contestants	Free-fall bank	Correct answers (bonus)	Total offer	Final bank total	Contract decision
1	John and Angel	$65,213	5 ($100,000)	$165,213	$1,300,010	Rejected
2	Chris and Katie	$35,132	4 ($80,000)	$115,132	$0	Rejected
3	Mike and Shana	$10,121	2 ($40,000)	$50,121	$529,921	Rejected
4	Jarrod and Shantell	$75,001	3 ($60,000)	$135,001	$950,011	Accepted
5	Matt and Jean	$45,014	2 ($40,000)	$85,014	$1,100,098	Rejected
6	Ebony and Deanna	$170,105	2 ($40,000)	$210,105	$194,896	Accepted
7	Nathan and Erica	$30,301	3 ($60,000)	$90,301	$349,890	Rejected
8	Katie and Kevin	$140,013	3 ($60,000)	$200,013	$299,969	Rejected
9	Darnell and Dion	$35,112	0 ($0)	$35,112	$0	Rejected
10	Ashle and Xandi	$100,313	1 ($20,000)	$120,313	$0	Accepted

=== Season 2 ===
Episode	Contestants	Guaranteed payout contract			Final bank total	Contract decision
Episode	Contestants	Free-fall bank	Correct answers (bonus)	Total offer	Final bank total	Contract decision
1	Ryan and Stephanie	$45,214	5 ($100,000)	$145,214	$570,344	Rejected
2	Noah and Lisa	$110,312	4 ($80,000)	$190,312	$1,095,498	Rejected
3	Milton and Aaryn	$65,004	3 ($60,000)	$125,004	$520,095	Rejected
4	Lenny and Sharon	$50,320	5 ($100,000)	$150,320	$850,632	Accepted
5	Delvar and Bonnie	$15,221	2 ($40,000)	$55,221	$399,792	Rejected
6	Jeff and Jamie	$20,011	3 ($60,000)	$80,011	$0	Rejected
7	Chris and Paris	$100,231	2 ($40,000)	$140,231	$0	Accepted
8	Angela and Jodi	$115,322	4 ($80,000)	$195,322	$220,333	Accepted
9	Tomeka and Andre	$65,241	2 ($40,000)	$105,241	$0	Accepted
10	Erin and Rachael	$115,024	4 ($80,000)	$195,024	$0	Rejected
11	Sheriese and Kieara	$74,912	3 ($60,000)	$134,912	$50,012	Rejected
12	Ruben and Sandy	$135,111	3 ($60,000)	$195,111	$0	Accepted
13	Cassandra and Victoria	$130,102	3 ($60,000)	$190,102	$0	Accepted
14	Prince and Chris	$100,043	3 ($60,000)	$160,043	$159,813	Rejected
15	Niko and Kassie	$155,313	1 ($20,000)	$175,313	$740,500	Rejected
16	Victor and Evelyn	$85,124	3 ($60,000)	$145,124	$499,899	Rejected
17	Jakia and Shana	$90,232	4 ($80,000)	$170,232	$565,422	Rejected
18	Brooke and Cody	$70,210	3 ($60,000)	$130,210	$0	Rejected
19	Steve and Nick	$49,891	2 ($40,000)	$89,891	$899,881	Accepted
20	Brooke and Kirk	$35,023	3 ($60,000)	$95,023	$1,415,098	Rejected

=== Season 3 ===
Episode	Contestants	Guaranteed payout contract			Final bank total	Contract decision
Episode	Contestants	Free-fall bank	Correct answers (bonus)	Total offer	Final bank total	Contract decision
1	Rebekah and Chris	$85,234	5 ($100,000)	$185,234	$1,455,631	Rejected
2	Bill and Meghan	$70,127	4 ($80,000)	$150,127	$820,045	Rejected
3	Matt and Nick	$40,237	5 ($100,000)	$140,237	$0	Rejected
4	Essence and Valencia	$60,189	2 ($40,000)	$100,189	$0	Accepted
5	Nellie and Taylor	$75,343	3 ($60,000)	$135,343	$1,670,254	Rejected
6	Damon and Deidra	$50,121	2 ($40,000)	$90,121	$0	Rejected
7	Holly and Michael	$45,103	2 ($40,000)	$85,103	$850,090	Accepted
8	NeAngela and Marcus	$135,120	3 ($60,000)	$195,120	$0	Rejected
9	Alex and Jodie	$15,140	2 ($40,000)	$55,140	$199,980	Rejected
10	Peter and Bob	$35,200	3 ($60,000)	$95,200	$0	Rejected
11	Hecthan and Hector	$15,400	2 ($40,000)	$55,400	$1,749,907	Rejected
12	Michael and Jahmar	$35,091	4 ($80,000)	$115,091	$1,115,076	Accepted
13	Janeris and Jesenia	$30,301	5 ($100,000)	$130,301	$104	Rejected
14	Goldin and Linda	$9,920	3 ($60,000)	$69,920	$0	Rejected
15	Karen and Lori	$10,011	5 ($100,000)	$110,011	$1,410,024	Rejected
16	Tiffany and CJ	$65,005	3 ($60,000)	$125,005	$79,732	Accepted
17	Keaton and Taylor	$55,132	0 ($0)	$55,132	$0	Accepted
18	Jeremie and Nikki	$60,001	5 ($100,000)	$160,001	$0	Rejected
19	Denise and Tisha	$50,100	3 ($60,000)	$110,100	$0	Rejected

=== Season 4 ===
Episode	Contestants	Guaranteed payout contract			Final bank total	Contract decision
Episode	Contestants	Free-fall bank	Correct answers (bonus)	Total offer	Final bank total	Contract decision
1	Lisa and Dan	$95,245	3 ($60,000)	$155,245	$545,225	Rejected
2	Brittany and CJ	$135,225	5 ($100,000)	$235,225	$910,266	Rejected
3	Tamara and Leo	$155,104	3 ($60,000)	$215,104	$0	Accepted
4	Travis and Michael	$120,415	4 ($80,000)	$200,415	$0	Rejected
5	KD and CJ	$135,144	3 ($60,000)	$195,144	$885,033	Accepted
6	Debbie and Ghadir	$165,223	1 ($20,000)	$185,223	$0	Accepted
7	Jason and Jay	$90,407	3 ($60,000)	$150,407	$0	Accepted
8	Terra and Brandi	$90,050	5 ($100,000)	$190,050	$600,188	Accepted
9	Apolo Ohno and Bianca Stam	$35,010	2 ($40,000)	$75,010	$100,000 (Note: This episode aired as a special for the 2020 Summer Olympics to raise money for the Team USA Fund. As a result of the final bank total being $0, they were offered $100,000.)	Rejected
10	Jon and Stephanie	$140,024	1 ($20,000)	$160,024	$0	Accepted
11	Tammy and Doug	$180,214	2 ($40,000)	$220,214	$1,199,988	Accepted
12	Evalyna and Shaun	$125,505	3 ($60,000)	$185,505	$790,494	Rejected
13	Mikail and Shakira	$115,334	4 ($80,000)	$195,334	$0	Accepted
14	Annalee and Lily	$135,112	4 ($80,000)	$215,112	$415,131	Accepted
15	Jordan and Maurcus	$140,118	3 ($60,000)	$200,118	$0	Rejected
16	Ted and Hayden	$70,018	2 ($40,000)	$110,018	$0	Accepted
17	Carmen and Toni	$25,261	2 ($40,000)	$65,261	$199,991	Rejected
18	Melvin and Meridith	$125,145	4 ($80,000)	$205,145	$0	Accepted
19	Andrea and Terry	$90,443	3 ($60,000)	$150,443	$605,561	Rejected
20	Amber and Chelsea	$85,313	1 ($20,000)	$105,313	$0	Accepted

=== Season 5 ===
Episode	Contestants	Guaranteed payout contract			Final bank total	Contract decision
Episode	Contestants	Free-fall bank	Correct answers (bonus)	Total offer	Final bank total	Contract decision
1	Christiana and Nic	$135,521	4 ($80,000)	$215,521	$1,350,633	Rejected
2	Monet and Kevyn	$125,125	4 ($80,000)	$205,125	$1,464,846	Accepted
3	Turner and Shelby	$145,044	3 ($60,000)	$205,044	$375,162	Accepted
4	Bria and Matt	$115,207	1 ($20,000)	$135,207	$0	Accepted
5	John and Toni	$150,203	4 ($80,000)	$230,203	$2,625,210	Accepted
6	Travis and Kelsey	$190,004	3 ($60,000)	$250,004	$0	Accepted
7	Rachel and Chris	$200,030	3 ($60,000)	$260,030	$899,989	Accepted
8	David and Chris	$45,314	1 ($20,000)	$65,314	$999,977	Accepted
9	Kavi and Radhika	$140,160	2 ($40,000)	$180,160	$0	Accepted
10	Karly and Megan	$50,627	3 ($60,000)	$110,627	$0	Rejected
11	Jerimiah and Nikki	$45,602	4 ($80,000)	$125,602	$640,398	Rejected
12	Turquoise and Donald	$90,326	3 ($60,000)	$150,326	$1,599,791	Accepted
13	Melissa and Liz	$180,123	3 ($60,000)	$240,123	$775,322	Accepted
14	Jakob and Yvonne	$134,914	1 ($20,000)	$154,914	$0	Accepted
15	Tom and Kasey	$170,134	3 ($60,000)	$230,134	$1,615,203	Accepted
16	Larry and Lauren	$115,500	1 ($20,000)	$135,500	$0	Accepted
17	Adam and Shelley	$140,113	2 ($40,000)	$180,113	$200,125	Rejected
18	Joel and Suzanne	$90,105	4 ($80,000)	$170,105	$829,995	Accepted
19	Tyler and Sabrina	$90,534	2 ($40,000)	$130,534	$0	Accepted
20	Richard and Latoya	$49,901	2 ($40,000)	$89,901	$0	Rejected

=== Season 6 ===
Episode	Contestants	Guaranteed payout contract			Final bank total	Contract decision
Episode	Contestants	Free-fall bank	Correct answers (bonus)	Total offer	Final bank total	Contract decision
1	Steven and Seth	$110,632	3 ($60,000)	$170,632	$1,660,629	Rejected
2	Vincent and Katy	$115,302	4 ($80,000)	$195,302	$0	Accepted
3	Hope and Francis	$95,118	2 ($40,000)	$135,118	$380,188	Rejected
4	Chad and Jerry	$60,224	5 ($100,000)	$160,224	$200	Accepted
5	Emma and Chrissy	$95,056	3 ($60,000)	$155,056	$1,144,851	Rejected
6	Richard and Erika	$69,885	3 ($60,000)	$129,885	$699,450	Accepted
7	Sydney and Nick	$185,214	0 ($0)	$185,214	$0	Accepted
8	Mallory and Madison	$35,100	0 ($0)	$35,100	$0	Rejected
9	Ellie and Nick	$145,432	2 ($40,000)	$185,432	$0	Accepted
10	Cydney and Jordan	$70,100	2 ($40,000)	$110,100	$840,089	Rejected

== Critical reception ==
The Wall has received mixed reviews by critics. Jan Chaney of Vulture dubbed The Wall as being "the most stereotypically American game show on television right now" and "absurd yet undeniably diverting." Chaney criticized the show for making "attempts to sell us something new, even though its concept is really based on old ideas [...] mixed up just enough [to] seem fresh".

Bethonie Butler of the Chicago Tribune agreed that "The Wall looks a lot like the famed Plinko game from CBS", but qualified that "originality is relative when it comes to game shows", remarking on the similarity between popular trivia game shows such as Who Wants to Be a Millionaire and Are You Smarter than a 5th Grader?

== European production ==
In Europe, the production is made in a studio in Poland where the 4 stories high wall is located. The crew of the show are mostly a local Polish crew. The producers, the host, and the participants are flown in for the filming of the show.

== International versions ==
Legend:

- Currently airing
- No longer airing
- Upcoming version

Country	Title	Presenter	Channel	Airdates	Top slot value	Possible top prize
Argentina	The Wall: Construye tu vida	Marley	Telefe	October 1, 2017 – December 31, 2017	AR$200,000	AR$2,274,995
Australia	The Wall	Axle Whitehead	Seven Network	October 30, 2017 – November 19, 2017	A$1,000,000	A$12,374,994
Belgium (Flanders)	The Wall: De muur die geeft en neemt	Niels Destadsbader	VTM	September 4, 2017 – November 7, 2017	€100,000	€1,137,495
Brazil	The Wall (part of Domingão com Huck)	Luciano Huck	Rede Globo	March 10, 2018 – present	R$150,000	R$1,729,995
Canada (Quebec)	Face au Mur	Maripier Morin	TVA	January 18, 2018 – March 2, 2018	C$200,000	C$2,599,994
Chile	The Wall	Rafael Araneda	Chilevisión	June 20, 2018 – August 29, 2018	CL$20,000,000	CL$247,499,940
China	好运梦想之墙	Hú Qiáohuá	iQiyi	February 15, 2022 – February 20, 2022	CN¥ 100,000	CN¥1,474,994
Colombia	The Wall	Andrea Serna	Caracol Televisión	January 30, 2018 – February 26, 2018	COP$200,000,000	COP$2,274,999,500
Denmark	The Wall - Danmark	Felix Smith	Kanal 5	September 5, 2019 – October 16, 2019	Kr 100,000	Kr 1,137,495
Finland	The Wall Suomi	Heikki Paasonen	Nelonen	September 22, 2018 – December 8, 2018 (Season 1); February 16, 2019 – May 4, 2019 (Season 2); October 5, 2019 – December 7, 2019 (Season 3)	€50,000	€629,994
France	The Wall : Face au mur	Christophe Dechavanne	TF1	February 27, 2017 – August 18, 2018	€150,000	€1,824,995
Germany	The Wall	Frank Buschmann	RTL	July 1, 2017 – August 11, 2017 (Season 1); August 3, 2018 – August 24, 2018 (Season 2)	€250,000	€3,069,994 (Season 1) €2,474,994 (Season 2)
Greece; Cyprus	The Wall	Grigoris Arnaoutoglou	ANT1	May 10, 2018 – July 27, 2018	€50,000	€629,994
Greece; Cyprus	The Wall	Christos Ferentinos	Skai TV	October 13, 2025 – April 30, 2026	€25,000	€350,000
Hungary	A Fal	Balázs Sebestyén	RTL Klub	November 19, 2017 – June 8, 2018	Ft.8,000,000	Ft.100,899,940
India (Tamil Nadu)	The Wall	Priyanka Deshpande and Ma Ka Pa Anand	Star Vijay	October 12, 2019 – March 7, 2020	₹2,000,000	₹24,749,994
Israel	The Wall	Zvika Hadar	Reshet 13	February 7, 2018 – October 2, 2018	500,000₪	6,187,494₪
Italy	The Wall	Gerry Scotti	Canale 5	November 20, 2017 – January 6, 2019	€100,000	€1,474,994
Italy	The Wall	Max Giusti	Canale 5	July 13, 2026 – September 6, 2026	€100,000	€978,989
Netherlands	BankGiro Loterij The Wall	Winston Gerschtanowitz	SBS 6	April 22, 2018 – May 27, 2018 (Season 1); January 13, 2019 – February 14, 2019 (Season 2)	€500,000	€6,187,494 (Season 1)
Philippines	The Wall Philippines	Billy Crawford	TV5 (via Viva Television) (Season 1); GMA Network (Season 2)	March 13, 2021 – September 11, 2021 (Season 1); August 28, 2022 – December 4, 2022 (Season 2)	₱1,000,000	₱12,374,994 (Season 1) ₱11,949,994 (Season 2)
Poland	The Wall. Wygraj marzenia	Paweł Orleański	TVP1 (Seasons 1-4); TVP2 (Season 4)	September 22, 2017 – December 29, 2017 (Season 1); January 5, 2018 – June 9, 2018 (Season 2); September 14, 2018 – January 4, 2019 (Season 3)	100,000 zł	1,237,494 zł
Poland	The Wall. Wygraj marzenia	Maciej Kurzajewski	TVP1 (Seasons 1-4); TVP2 (Season 4)	March 8, 2019 – October 6, 2019 (Season 4)	100,000 zł	1,237,494 zł
Romania	The Wall – Marele zid	Valentin Butnaru	Antena 1	September 13, 2017 – April 23, 2020	150,000 Lei	1,894,994 Lei (season 1)
Russia	Стена	Andrey Malakhov	Russia 1	October 22, 2017 – December 9, 2017	5,000,000 Ruble	61,874,400 Ruble
Spain	The Wall: Cambia tu vida	Carlos Sobera	Telecinco	June 23, 2017 – September 8, 2017	€100,000	€1,374,995
Thailand	The Wall กำแพงพลิกชีวิต	Vuthithorn "Woody" Milintachinda	ONE HD	January 6, 2018 – July 21, 2018 (Season 1)	฿500,000	฿5,599,995 (first 16 episodes) ฿6,099,994 (the rest of the series)
Thailand	The Wall กำแพงพลิกชีวิต	Pakachon Wo-Onsri	ONE HD	October 20, 2018 – April 3, 2019 (Season 2)	฿500,000	฿5,599,995 (first 16 episodes) ฿6,099,994 (the rest of the series)
Thailand	The Wall กำแพงพลิกชีวิต	Pakachon Wo-Onsri	ONE HD	November 23, 2019 – December 21, 2019 (rest of Season 2)	฿500,000	฿5,599,995 (first 16 episodes) ฿6,099,994 (the rest of the series)
United Kingdom	The Wall	Danny Dyer	BBC One	October 12, 2019 – November 16, 2019 (Series 1); October 3, 2020 – July 17, 2021 (Series 2); February 23, 2021 – June 5, 2021 (Series 3); February 21, 2022 – April 2, 2022 (Series 4)	£50,000	£687,495 (series 1–3) £977,495 (series 4)
United States (in Spanish)	The Wall	Marco Antonio Regil	Telemundo	January 1, 2020 – January 17, 2020	$200,000	$2,874,994
Uruguay	The Wall: Cumplí tu Sueño	Rafael Cotelo	Canal 10	March 13, 2018 – June 1, 2018	U$300,000	U$3,489,995
Vietnam	Tường lửa	Trường Giang	VTV3	July 18, 2019 – October 3, 2019 (Season 1); August 20, 2020 – December 31, 2020 (Season 2)	500,000,000₫	6,187,494,000₫

== See also ==
- Peggle – a similar game published by PopCap Games
- Tipping Point – a similar game show airing in the United Kingdom, whereby counters worth £50 are dropped into a "win zone" to win money
- The Price Is Right – the Plinko game is similar to this game show
