= The Wall (Chilean game show) =

2018 Chilean game show

- Genre: Game show
- Based on: The Wall by: Andrew Glassman; LeBron James
- Presented by: Rafael Araneda
- Country of origin: Chile
- Original language: Spanish

Original release
- Network: Chilevisión
- Release: June 20 – August 29, 2018

The Wall is the Chilean adaptation of the NBC American namesake show.. The program was premiered on June 20, 2018. It is hosted by the Chilean presenter Rafael Araneda.
