= Morning Show (Class FM) =

Hungarian radio program

Morning Show was a Hungarian morning radio show that aired from 6 a.m. to 10 a.m. on Class FM in Hungary. The show started on 30 November 2009 and ended on 16 November 2016. It was hosted by Balázs Sebestyén, Ferenc Rákóczi and János Vadon. It has been the most popular morning radio show since 2011, and has won industry awards.

== See also ==
- List of Hungarian-language radio stations
- Morning zoo
