= Hungary's Got Talent =

- Genre: Talent show
- Created by: Simon Cowell
- Presented by: Balázs Sebestyén; István Dombóvári
- Judges: Márkó Linczényi; Patrícia Kovács; Eszter Horgas; Imre Csuja
- Country of origin: Hungary
- Original language: Hungarian
- No. of series: 1
- No. of episodes: 11

Production
- Running time: 70–100 minutes

Original release
- Network: RTL Klub
- Release: 10 October – 19 December 2015

Related
- Got Talent (franchise)

Hungary's Got Talent is the Hungarian version of the Got Talent franchise, broadcast from 10 October 2015 on RTL Klub.

The original judging panel consisted of Márkó Lincényi, Patrícia Kovács, Eszter Horgas and Imre Csuja. The show was originally hosted by Balázs Sebestyén and István Dombóvári.

There has been one winner of the show to date: Dirty Led Light Crew.

The show consists of auditions, three semi-finals and a final. Participants can sign up for the program from the age of four without any genre binding to any event.

During the selections, there are four red buttons and one golden buzzer on the jury's table. The jury members may press the red button during any performance. If a competitor is rewarded with a red button by all four jury members, then the competition ends. The golden buzzer can only be pressed once by each jury member once a year, and once by the presenters. The five competitors who get the golden buzzer automatically go to the final. The winning prize is 12 million huf.

== Series summary ==
Series	Start	Finish	Winner	Runner up	Third place	Main judges (no order)				Presenter(s)
1	10 October 2015	19 December 2015	Dirty Led Light Crew electronic light act	Tamás Badár magician	Nikolett Molnár pole dancer	Márkó Linczényi	Patrícia Kovács	Eszter Horgas	Imre Csuja	Balázs Sebestyén; István Dombóvári

== Ratings ==
Episode	Air date	Official rating (millions)
Auditions 1	10 October	1.38
Auditions 2	17 October	1.53
Auditions 3	24 October	1.66
Auditions 4	31 October	1.62
Auditions 5	7 November	1.63
Auditions 6	14 November	1.61
Auditions 7	21 November	1.63
Semi-final 1	28 November	1.36
Semi-final 2	5 December	1.26
Semi-final 3	12 December	1.15
Final	19 December	1.30
