= Enamorándonos =

American dating TV show

- Based on: Original Format "Love is In The Air" owned by Soho Formats, LLC.
- Presented by: Rafael Araneda; Ana Patricia Gámez
- Country of origin: United States
- Original language: Spanish
- No. of seasons: 5
- No. of episodes: 739

Production
- Executive producers: Zeynep Peker Onur Peker Can Peker
- Production location: Miami, Florida
- Running time: 120 minutes
- Production companies: Soho Productions, LLC.

Original release
- Network: UniMás
- Release: September 8, 2019 – present

Enamorándonos (English: "Falling in Love"; also known in the United States as Enamorándonos USA) is an American dating show that is shown on Spanish-language channel Univision's affiliate, UniMás. The show is aired every Monday through Friday at 8P/7C. The show is hosted by Chilean show host Rafael Araneda and Mexican show host Ana Patricia Gámez. It was formerly hosted by Mexican Karina Banda. Banda announced she was leaving the show on April 1, 2022. The show is broadcast in the United States and in Puerto Rico.

In 2020, Enamorándonos was nominated for the Critics' Choice Television Awards.

== Format ==
Enamorándonos is a live dating/matchmaking format that was originally popularized in Turkey. With 17 years on live TV and 5000+ broadcast episodes, the format has been a huge success. Since its debut, 120.000+ people have appeared on Love Is In The Air. So far, 500 couples have been matched on the show. The show brings diverse people together for matchmaking.

Candidates who are looking to find their "perfect match" apply to the show and join the live studio show. The viewers at home who are interested in knowing these candidates call into the studio to meet them. At the studio, they meet for the first time on a blind date, and talk through an automated wall. The wall is then withdrawn, and the candidates decide whether to walk away or go on a full fledged date.

== Season summary ==
Couples	Married	Still together
Lizzy Arredondo & Richard Farra	Yes	Yes
Madelyne Aldas & Nicola Ianselli	Yes	Yes
Daniela Rodriguez & Darwin Cipion	Yes	Widowed (Note: Daniela died unexpectedly after a medical procedure on August 25, 2021 in Aguascalientes.)
Jatziry Chavarria & Cristal Aracely	Yes	Yes
Lety Perez & Leodan Gonzalez	Yes	Yes
Naykeli Moran & Joel Andres	Yes	Yes
Daniela Nares & Arturo Contreras	Yes	Yes
Linda Chu & Diego	Yes	Yes
Karen Isabel Rojas & Neville Hidalgo	Yes	Yes
Karolina Gomez Arias & Richard Villamil	Yes	Yes

== Spin Off ==
During 2022, Televisa and Univision announced the creation of an off-shoot series, named Enamorandonos: La Isla, which was hosted by Karina Banda and her husband, Puerto Rican actor, singer and show host Carlos Ponce. The offshoot is available in the United States and Latin America, but it was filmed in Turkey.

Enamorándonos: La Isla is an unscripted reality TV format. Eight women and eight men look to find their perfect match, living together in a picturesque mansion or an island resort for 10 weeks, getting to know each other. The goal is to help these people find their soulmates and help them take the next step in their lives with a fairytale wedding.

In the summer of 2024, Imagen Televisión began to license the format for a daily Mexican version of the series, currently hosted from Mexico City by Gaby Ramírez and Mauricio Mancera.
