= Bingo America =

American game show broadcast by Game Show Network

- Created by: Andrew Glassman
- Presented by: Patrick Duffy (2008); Richard Karn (2008–09)
- Starring: Crystal Wallasch (2008); Diane Mizota (2008–09)
- Country of origin: United States
- Original language: English
- No. of seasons: 2
- No. of episodes: 105

Production
- Running time: 21–22 minutes
- Production company: Glassman Media

Original release
- Network: Game Show Network
- Release: March 31, 2008 – January 2, 2009

Bingo America is an American game show broadcast by Game Show Network from March 31, 2008 to January 2, 2009. The series follows two contestants as they try to compete to win up to $100,000. Additionally, the series lets at-home viewers print bingo cards online that allow them to play along with the show to win small amounts of money for themselves.

Created and produced by Andrew Glassman, the show was originally hosted by Patrick Duffy and Crystal Wallasch. When its second season premiered on October 6, 2008, they were replaced by Richard Karn and Diane Mizota, respectively.

== Gameplay ==
=== Main game ===
Two contestants compete on each episode. On each turn, a Bingo ball comes out of the hopper and a question is asked. Each ball has a number from 1 to 75 and a letter in the word "BINGO" printed on it. If the question is answered correctly, the player earns the letter from that ball and the number on the ball is added in dollars to the bank, which starts at $500 (e.g., if G-50 comes out, the bank increases by $50). If the letter is a duplicate already earned by the player, no extra letters are earned. The first player that spells out BINGO from the earned letters wins the game. A Free-Space Ball with a sponsor's logo acts as a wild card in the game. The player who answers a question correctly when that ball is rolled out can choose any letter, and $100 is added to the bank. Two regular games are played. Contestants who win both games win the match and receive all the money in the bank. If each contestant wins one game, a five-question tie-breaker game is played. The first question's answer begins with a B, the second question's answer starts with I, and so on. The first to answer three questions correctly wins the money in the bank and goes on to play the Bingo Bonus Board for a chance at $100,000.

If time runs short during a game, gameplay moves to a 50/50 round. In the 50/50 round the remaining questions of that game are asked in a multiple-choice fashion, with two possible answers given. Contestants who answer incorrectly at this point have credit for the question (and the given letter, if applicable) automatically given to their opponent, however, no money is added to the bank for that question.

=== Bingo Bonus Board ===
The winner of the main game plays the Bingo Bonus Board, which used two different formats. In the first season of the show, each number on the Bingo Bonus Board represented a cash amount or another prize, up to a grand prize of $100,000 cash. Every prize was repeated at least twice on the board. The contestant chose one number at a time, and won the first prize to be revealed twice.

In the second season, 55 of the 75 spaces concealed cash values, while 20 hid "wrecking balls." Contestants started with the "B" row (the only row without wrecking balls) and selected a number in that row. After each selection, the contestants could leave the game with the money already won or risk their winnings and continue with a selection in the next row. Contestants who pick wrecking balls forfeit the money already accumulated and the bonus round ends. Contestants who made five successful picks kept all of their accumulated bonus money and activated the Bingo Sphere one more time for the Superball. If any of the contestants' five chosen bonus numbers matched the one on the Superball, their bonus round winnings were augmented to $100,000.

Marine John Stefan was the first contestant to win $100,000, doing so under the first format on April 11, 2008. John Hanlin was the only player to win the top prize under the second format, doing so on October 22, 2008.

=== Home viewer interaction ===
At-home viewers are also allowed to play along with the show downloading bingo cards available at GSN's website. Once the taping of the show is complete and all of the randomly drawn numbers have been recorded, a computer generates bingo cards that viewers can then download and print for the broadcast of the show a few weeks later. A home player who earns a "Bingo" is directed to GSN's website to claim a $50 prize.

== Production ==
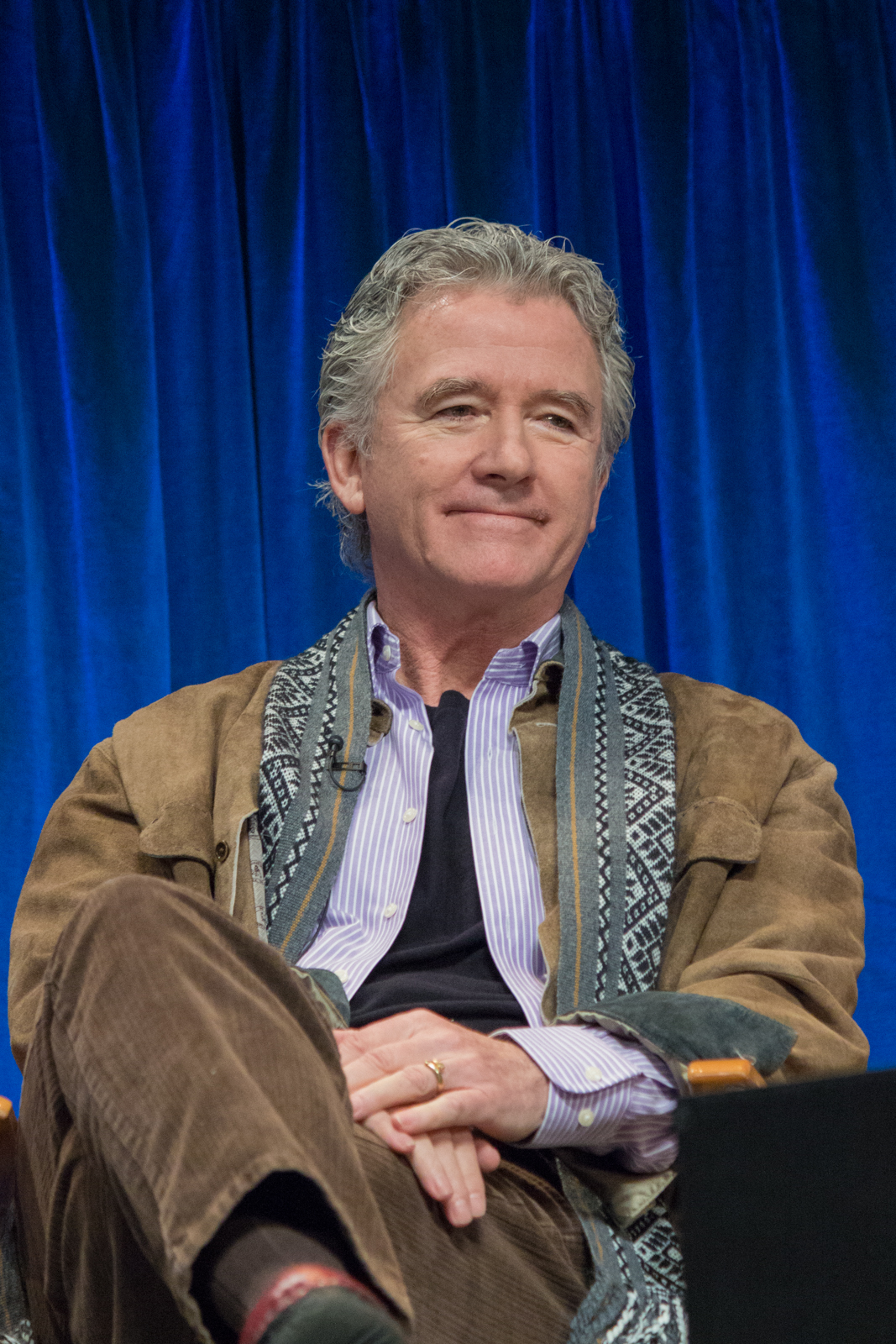
Patrick Duffy, host of the first season.

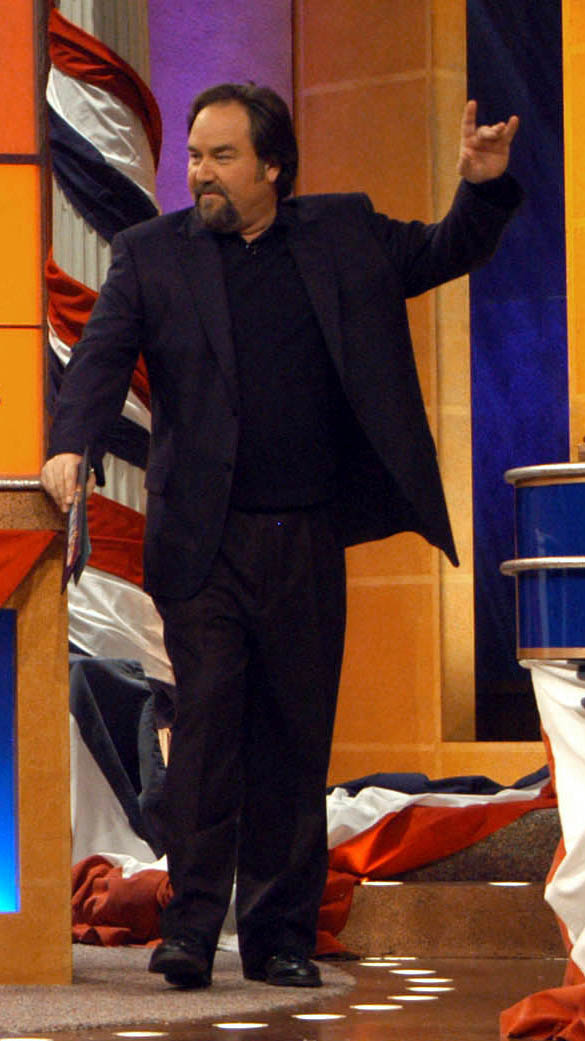
Richard Karn, host of the second season.

The series, created by veteran television producer Andrew Glassman, was first announced as green-lit on January 30, 2008. The first season contained 40 episodes, which began airing on March 31, 2008. A second season of the series, consisting of 65 episodes, debuted on October 6, 2008, with Karn and Mizota joining the show. When asked to explain the host change, GSN argued that while Duffy was a "terrific" host and the network "loved working with him," Karn was "a perfect fit for all the exciting changes [in the second season]."

== Reception ==
Bingo America received mixed critical reception. David Hinckley of the New York Daily News argued that the series only got "partly there" in attempting to bring bingo to television, and "doesn't quite capture what the game is about." Additionally, Ed Bark, a former television critic at The Dallas Morning News, argued that the show, "moves along briskly enough and it won't hurt anybody," and added that it had potential to raise the level of GSN's "miniscule" [sic] audience.

== Merchandise ==
In 2008, GSN announced plans to launch a new website featuring multiple variations of game show-themed merchandise, the now-defunct website was launched September 30 of that year. Among the items featured in the online store was an interactive DVD game by Imagination Entertainment based on the series' format, which was released at the time the second season premiered. The game plays similarly to the show, beginning with a "Bingo Draw" round. During this round, players attempt to be the first to earn a "Bingo" while accumulating points by correctly answering trivia questions. Once a player earns a "Bingo" the "Bingo Bonus Board" round is played. The winner of the previous round tries to add more points to their score by matching two hidden numbers; the round ends once the player finds a match. Opposing players can also earn points by guessing which numbers the other player chooses in this round. Whoever earns the most points during the game is the winner.

== See also ==
- National Bingo Night (American game show)
