= Your Eyelids Are Growing Heavy =

1981 novel by Barbara Paul

- First edition
- Author: Barbara Paul
- Language: English
- Genre: Crime
- Publisher: Doubleday
- Publication date: 1981
- Publication place: United States
- Media type: Print (paperback)
- Pages: 187 pp
- ISBN: 0-385-17466-7
- OCLC: 6863073
- Dewey Decimal: 813/.54 19
- LC Class: PS3566.A82615 Y6

Your Eyelids Are Growing Heavy is the fourth crime novel by the American writer Barbara Paul.

Set in 1970s Pittsburgh, Pennsylvania, it opens as the groundskeeper of Schenley Park Golf Course tries to waken Megan Phillips on the fourteenth-hole fairway, where she seems to be sleeping off a drinking binge. But Phillips, after psychiatric examination, can't remember a large blank in her life. Slowly she begins to realize that she was hypnotized, and that she must find the culprit to get her life back.

Paul said that she wrote the novel in two weeks, in a deliberate attempt to see how fast a novel could be written. She was pleased with the result, saying that "Doubleday accepted the book without a murmur... it stands up to re-reading, which is always the acid test."
