= Kill Fee =

1985 novel by Barbara Paul

- Author: Barbara Paul
- Language: English
- Publication date: 1985

Kill Fee is a 1985 novel by American writer Barbara Paul.

== Plot ==
Leon Walsh is publisher for the magazine Summit, which he will soon take over since his boss Joe Sussman has been killed. Walsh had a perfect alibi at the time of the murder. Professional killer Pluto then sends Walsh a bill of $100,000 for the murder.

== Reception ==
Marlyn Roberts of The Edmonton Journal wrote that the novel was one of Paul's best and also typical of her style. She noted that Paul allowed her characters to be flawed. Roberts wrote "What is really original about this plot, though, is that the identity of the killer is revealed near the beginning of the story. What makes it even more surprising is that despite this information – which in most detective stories is withheld until the end, as would seem necessary to hold the reader's interest – our interest in Kill Fee does not flag."

Alice Cromie wrote in The Chicago Tribune that the novel "has a peculiarly apt title. It also stretches the long arm of coincidence so far you could wrap it around the Empire State, but even so, holds your attention through a preposterous plot all the way to a shocking and ironic final twist. You may find it hard to believe that anyone would research the backgrounds and current circumstances of several diverse lives in order to determine how each person could benefit from the death of someone near and undear, and then remove the stumbling block and demand payment from the surprised and so far blameless character who benefits from the killing."

== Adaptations ==
The novel was adapted into a 1990 TV-film, Murder C.O.D..
