= Murder C.O.D. =

- Genre: Crime; Thriller
- Based on: Kill Fee by Barbara Paul
- Teleplay by: Andrew Peter Marin
- Directed by: Alan Metzger
- Starring: Patrick Duffy; William Devane
- Music by: Fred Karlin
- Country of origin: United States
- Original language: English

Production
- Executive producer: Perry Lafferty
- Producer: Fred Whitehead
- Cinematography: Bernd Heinl
- Editor: Pamela Malouf
- Running time: 100 min
- Production companies: Perry Lafferty Productions; The Kushner-Locke Company; World International Network

Original release
- Network: NBC
- Release: September 21, 1990

Murder C.O.D. is a 1990 American made-for-television crime drama film directed by Alan Metzger starring Patrick Duffy and William Devane based on the Barbara Paul novel Kill Fee.

The movie was filmed in Portland, Oregon in May 1990, including on the South Park Blocks.

== Plot summary ==
Police officer Steve Murtaugh is blackmailed for having an extramarital affair. Moving with his wife from Chicago to Portland Oregon, the blackmailer follows.

== Cast ==
- Patrick Duffy as Steve Murtaugh
- Chelsea Field as Ellie
- Alex Hyde-White as Corbin
- Harris Laskaway as Jerry Walsh
- Janet Margolin as Maye Walsh
- Allan Miller as Leon Walsh
- Charlie Robinson as Lt. Silk
- Mariette Hartley as Sally Kramer
- William Devane as Alex Brandt
