= Spin the Wheel (game show) =

American television game show

- Genre: Game show
- Created by: Justin Timberlake; Andrew Glassman
- Presented by: Dax Shepard
- Composer: Michael Lord
- Country of origin: United States
- Original language: English
- No. of seasons: 1
- No. of episodes: 10

Production
- Executive producers: Justin Timberlake; Andrew Glassman; Rick Yorn; Johnny Wright
- Producer: Dax Shepard
- Production locations: Universal Studios, Universal City, California
- Running time: 43 minutes
- Production companies: Tennman Entertainment; Glassman Media; LBI Entertainment

Original release
- Network: Fox
- Release: June 20 – September 5, 2019

Spin the Wheel is an American trivia and strategy game show that premiered on Fox on June 20, 2019. Hosted by actor and comedian Dax Shepard, the show features a 40 feet (12 m) high vertical roulette wheel divided into 48 wedges that can award money to contestants or partially/completely wipe out their winnings. The show's producers scout for Good Samaritans to reward with a chance to earn up to $23 million per episode.

== Gameplay ==
The game is played in four rounds, with the contestant receiving four spins per round of a giant vertical roulette wheel divided into 48 sections. The first three rounds involve answering multiple-choice trivia questions in various fields of pop culture or general knowledge. The goal is to accumulate money in a bank, with a floor of $0.

=== Round 1: Quickspin ===
On each of the four turns, the contestant spins the wheel and is asked a question with two answer choices while it is in motion. They have ten seconds to answer; once the wheel stops, the value of the spin is added to the bank for a correct answer or deducted for a miss. The maximum value on the wheel is $500,000, allowing the contestant to bank up to $2 million.

=== Round 2: Quickspin + ===
This round follows the same format as Quickspin, but with three answer choices per question. A friend or family member is also brought onstage and given control of a button, which they secretly may press during the contestant's ten-second answer time to double the value of the spin. The button may be used on any or all of the four questions, allowing the contestant to bank up to $4 million.

=== Round 3: Build Your Wheel ===
Two spaces each of $1 million and "Back to Zero" are placed on the wheel, the latter wiping out the entire bank if they are hit, and penalty spaces of up to $200,000 are added as well. The wheel now displays four sets of four low-value blue spaces each ($1 to $1,000), which the contestant may try to change during this round. After seeing the first few words of a question, they choose one of four amounts to play for ($250,000, $500,000, $1 million, or $2 million); each value may only be used once. The entire question is then asked, with four answer choices. A correct answer allows the contestant to apply the chosen amount to one set of blue spaces, either placing all of it on one space or spreading it evenly across two or more. In a three-way division, one wedge may carry a dollar more or less than the others. (Note: For example, when split three ways, a $1 million prize leaves $333,333 on two wedges and $333,334 on another, while a $2 million prize leaves $666,667 on two and $666,666 on one.) A miss turns some of the spaces into "Back to Zero" - one to four, in ascending order of the chosen values. The contestant then spins the wheel, and the bank is increased or reduced based on the result of the spin. Up to $8 million can be banked, and all changes made to the wheel carry over into the final round.

Depending on the contestant's answers to the questions, the total number of "Back to Zero" spaces on the wheel at the end of this round can range from two to twelve.

=== Round 4: Final Spins ===
The contestant's partner is brought back onstage. Before each spin, the host makes a cash offer to quit the game, based on the amount in the bank (using an undisclosed calculation formula) and the risk of losing. The partner secretly decides whether or not to accept the offer, after which the contestant spins the wheel.

The maximum value of penalty spaces in this round is increased to $500,000, and spaces are added to the wheel as follows:

- 1st spin: No changes
- 2nd spin: One $1 million space and one "Back to Zero" on the opposite side
- 3rd spin: One $2 million space and two "Back to Zero"
- 4th spin: One $3 million space and three "Back to Zero"

The game ends after the fourth spin, or after any spin in which the wheel stops on "Back to Zero" or any penalty space greater than or equal to the bank total. The helper's decisions are then revealed. If they have turned down every offer, the contestant receives the final bank total; otherwise, the contestant receives the value of the first accepted offer. Up to $9 million can be banked, for a potential maximum bank of $23 million.

== The wheel ==
The show features a vertical roulette wheel, 40 feet (12 m) in diameter and divided into forty-eight light-emitting diode wedges worth either a dollar amount or “Back to Zero”. In contrast, popular game show The Price Is Right's Big Wheel is 9 feet, 8 inches tall, and Wheel of Fortune's namesake is 16.5 feet wide.

The wedges’ typeface for displaying the dollar amounts is inspired by Federal Reserve Notes from U.S. Currency. The wheel has pegs fashioned from thick metal pipes, which the contestant grips in order to start the rotation. A large, metallic silver ball bounces among the pegs but stays within the wheel's glass-enclosed interior, eventually coming to rest as the wheel stops and determining the outcome of the spin. The wheel is so large that a structural engineer, Fraser Smith of Mendenhall Smith Structural Engineers, was commissioned to design and build it, along with a support system.

Neither the wheel nor the game are fixed to have any certain outcome. In 1954, the U.S. Supreme Court ruled in Federal Communications Commission v. American Broadcasting Co., Inc. 347 U.S. 284, that quiz shows were not a form of gambling which paved the way for their introduction to television. In the years that followed a series of quiz show scandals tainted the genre. A formal congressional subcommittee investigation began in 1959. In 1960, Congress amended the Communications Act of 1934 to prohibit the fixing of quiz shows. Spin the Wheel, like all U.S. television quiz shows, is bound not to fix the game by leaking trivia questions or rigging the wheel.

As stated on-air by Dax Shepard, the length and speed of each spin are determined at random. The result of a spin is decided by the first section in which the ball comes to rest for a minimum of five seconds.

== Episodes ==
The show's producers scout for Good Samaritan-type individuals to reward with a chance to earn up to $23 million per episode. Each episode starts with the backstory of who the contestant is and what makes them deserving of a monetary windfall.

No.	Title	Original release date	U.S. viewers (millions)
1	"Konzelman Family"	June 20, 2019	3.45
The episode featured Dan Konzelman, a former Eagle Scout from Tacoma, Washington, who heroically pulled at least fifteen victims from the crash of the 2017 Tacoma Amtrak derailment. Playing with him was his younger brother Darien, also an Eagle Scout; the team ultimately won $195,318. Before the end of the game, his brother used the "Walk Away”, not risking losing everything in the final spins. Had Darien not done that, they would have won over $1.3 million.
2	"Feiler Family"	June 27, 2019	2.53
The episode featured Las Vegas, Nevada's Annmarie Feiler, founder and executive director of Urban Seed Foundation (USF), a school gardening program for at-risk students. Feiler was also central in a relief effort by Las Vegas chefs and restaurateurs to provide meals to first responders, medical personnel, blood donors, as well as coroners and funeral home workers dealing with the immediate aftermath of the 2017 Las Vegas mass shooting. The "largest mass shooting in modern American history", was by one man into an outdoor concert crowd of thousands resulting in 58 deaths and injuries to over eight hundred people. Utilizing social media, initially Facebook, then its messaging service WhatsApp, with a new online group "USF Food Volunteers", scores of people donated, cooked, and delivered thousands of hot prepared meals each day to thirty drop-off locations to feed the aid workers and volunteers. Joined by her daughter Mackenzie, they were playing to earn money to pay for more USF gardens. Mackenzie took the first offer of $39,478. Had Mackenzie rejected the offers, Annmarie would have walked away with over $1.1 million.
3	"Latham Family"	July 11, 2019	2.67
The episode featured U.S. Marine Corps veteran, and Purple Heart recipient Joe Latham from Aliso Viejo, California. During his first combat deployment in 2004, he was hospitalized when an improvised explosive device (IED) went off near his vehicle. He was happy that he escaped without major injuries. After sixteen years in the service he went to school to become a clinical psychologist specializing in the treatment of post-traumatic stress disorder (PTSD) for fellow veterans. His family partner was his wife T.J.; their game ended early when the ball landed on a “Back to Zero” wedge.
4	"Smith Family"	July 18, 2019	2.43
The episode featured Justin Smith, a women's basketball coach for the University of Dubuque in Dubuque, Iowa. He heroically saved the team from a traffic accident when they were traveling back New Year's Eve from an NCAA Division III tournament in Nashville, Tennessee. While on Interstate 24 in Kentucky, the driver had a medical emergency and "kind of passed out," said Justin, "we hit a guard rail going about 70 [miles per hour]." Justin stepped in to take the wheel, and get the bus off the highway; then diverted traffic until the bus was moved out of the way. His family partner was his wife Casey, the girls basketball coach at Hempstead High School. Their spins did not go well for the first three rounds netting only $1,000. In the Final Spins round they fared better, accumulating $4.05 million. Ultimately they finished with $736,000 as Casey accepted the final Walk Away offer.
5	"Villarreal Family"	July 25, 2019	2.45
The episode featured Mariana Villarreal, a Hooters girl (waitress) in Roswell, Georgia, and a student majoring in environmental science. In May 2015 the-then twenty-two year old underwent surgery to donate a kidney to a long-time customer, and Vietnam War veteran who lost both of his to cancer. In talking with him she found out he was undergoing dialysis and wanted to help. The Hooters Community Endowment Fund honored the newly hired employee by donating $20,000 in her name to the National Kidney Foundation. Her grandmother, who she was unable to help, had recently died from kidney failure, so she was glad she could assist. For normal function you only need one kidney. In August 2015, to draw attention to National Minority Donor Awareness Week (first week of August), she was the guest of Senator Jose Peralta to encourage organ donation among minority communities in New York. Her partner in the game was her younger sister Melissa; their game ended early when the ball landed on a “Back to Zero” wedge during the fourth round.
6	"Stenzel Family"	August 1, 2019	2.43
The episode featured salon owner and non-profit worker Leah Stenzel from Scottsdale, Arizona. In 2013 she founded a non-profit, Global Rescue Project, which runs an orphanage in Ghana, West Africa to address the exploitation of children in the fishing industry. “Children are sold by their parents in exchange for the false promise of a better life.” They actually become child slave labor on Lake Volta, the world's largest man-made lake. They face malnourishment, no “health care or education”, and “violent conditions”, and 16-hour work days. The orphanage has saved ninety children from slave child labor conditions as of August 2019, she hopes to save another 6500. Her partner in the game was her sister Tricia. Their game ended early when the ball landed on a “Back to Zero” wedge on the second spin during the fourth round.
7	"Bellamy Family"	August 8, 2019	1.90
The episode featured Febin Bellamy, an Indian immigrant and Georgetown student in Monroe, New York who started an initiative called Unsung Heroes. Raised in Brooklyn, Bellamy did not always appreciate the opportunities he had at school. In his later years of high school his father suffered a debilitating stroke so Bellamy took a service job cooking burgers to bring in more funds. While there he felt judged for his work rather than his potential and realized others likely thought the same. He earned enough to get into Georgetown and ended up interviewing over a hundred service workers who were likely under-appreciated. He started Unsung Heroes to help them achieve their dreams. In 2017 “the organization is expanding to thirty colleges and five high schools across the country.” His partner in the game was his older sister Blessy. They had $865,100 at the end, but won $95,650 as Blessy took the second Walk Away offer.
8	"Harrolle Family"	August 15, 2019	2.07
The episode featured Angela Harrolle from Phoenix, Arizona. After an international career in government service she married Bruce, a former police officer/paramedic/firefighter from Tucson, Arizona and transitioned to selling real estate for government employees. Her husband was killed on duty in 2008, but the health insurance for her and their children was soon cut off; she fought the injustice by getting “Harrolle’s Law” passed in 2010 which extends benefits for surviving families of emergency personnel killed on duty. She is president of the 100 Club of Arizona, an organization doing financial assistance and support for emergency professionals killed in the line of duty. Her partner in the game was her sister Casey. Their game ended early when the ball landed on a “Back to Zero” wedge on the first spin during the fourth round; however, Casey had taken the first "Walk Away" offer of $81,767, ensuring that amount.
9	"Genfi Family"	September 5, 2019	2.08
The episode featured Yaya Genfi, a nurse from New York City, New York. She is the oldest of six children, the family emigrated from Ghana. She graduated from nursing school in 2011, and is RN, BSN, a Pediatric and PICU Travel Nurse. After her father passed in 2017, the family honored him by conducting medical missions to Ghana: donating supplies to hospitals, giving check-ups to orphans, and other needy children. Her partner in the game was her sister Rena; their time ended on the show after the thirteenth spin landed on zero.
10	"Ponce Family"	September 5, 2019	2.08
The episode featured Levi Ponce, an American artist and activist from the Pacoima, Los Angeles area noted for his public murals throughout urban areas of the San Fernando Valley and surrounding areas in Southern California. He did not see art in many areas where he traveled so set out to create some starting in 2009, Pacoima is now known as the Mural Mile through his efforts. He organizes local residents to be the subjects and inspirations, as well as the volunteer pool to create the works which he does for free. He does them throughout California to transform neighborhoods. His partner in the game was his wife Sarah, she ended up accepting the third walk away offer of $152,404; if they had stayed the course they would have won $550,000.

== Game summaries ==
Game summaries
Episode	Contestant	Family partner	Round 1	Round 2	Round 3	Offer #1	Offer #2	Offer #3	Offer #4	Round 4	Result
1	Daniel Konzelman	Darien, younger brother	$227,000	$537,000	$2,070,434	$140,358	$195,318	$225,469	$368,049	$1,370,434	$195,318
2	Annemarie Feiler	Mackenzie, daughter	$20,999	$516,199	$0	$39,279	$84,523	$121,686	$223,860	$1,140,000	$39,279
3	Joe Latham	T.J., wife	$200,001	$150,201	$550,301	$61,866	$101,417	—N/a	—N/a	$0	$0
4	Justin Smith	Casey, wife	$215,000	$184,900	$1,000	$39,478	$112,309	$168,445	$736,161	$4,051,000	$736,161
5	Mariana Villareal	Melissa, younger sister	$90,001	$10,200	$1,150,200	$57,770	—N/a	—N/a	—N/a	$0	$0
6	Leah Stenzel	Tricia, sister	$355,000	$326,000	$240,000	$53,456	$72,765	—N/a	—N/a	$0	$0
7	Febin Bellamy	Blessy, older sister	$255,099	$316,099	$100	$62,241	$95,650	$129,182	$196,132	$865,100	$95,650
8	Angela Harrolle	Casey, younger sister	$265,000	$320,002	$1,220,002	$81,767	—N/a	—N/a	—N/a	$0	$81,767
9	Yaya Genfi	Rena, sister	$0	$200	$1,633,534	$137,724	—N/a	—N/a	—N/a	$0	$0
10	Levi Ponce	Sara, wife	$31,100	$200,000	$0	$68,899	$130,695	$152,404	$200,518	$550,000	$152,404

== Production ==
Fox, in an effort to acquire more unscripted shows like Hell's Kitchen, The Four, and Love Connection, entered a bidding war with multiple networks to obtain Spin in 2017.

Spin the Wheel is the result of three production companies: executive producer Andrew Glassman’s Glassman Media; creative and executive producer Justin Timberlake’s Tennman Entertainment, a 2007 joint venture between Interscope Records and Timberlake; and executive producer Rick Yorn's LBI Entertainment.

== Ratings ==
Viewership and ratings per episode of Spin the Wheel
No.	Title	Air date	Rating/share (18–49)	Viewers (millions)	DVR (18–49)	DVR viewers (millions)	Total (18–49)	Total viewers (millions)
1	"Konzelman Family"	June 20, 2019	0.8/4	3.45	0.2	0.59	1.0	4.04
2	"Feiler Family"	June 27, 2019	0.6/3	2.53	0.1	0.49	0.7	3.02
3	"Latham Family"	July 11, 2019	0.6/3	2.67	0.1	0.49	0.7	3.16
4	"Smith Family"	July 18, 2019	0.5/3	2.43	0.1	0.38	0.6	2.81
5	"Villarreal Family"	July 25, 2019	0.5/3	2.45	0.1	0.38	0.6	2.83
6	"Stenzel Family"	August 1, 2019	0.5/3	2.43	0.1	0.39	0.6	2.82
7	"Bellamy Family"	August 8, 2019	0.5/2	1.90	0.1	0.34	0.6	2.26
8	"Harrolle Family"	August 15, 2019	0.5/3	2.07	0.1	0.34	0.6	2.41
9	"Genfi Family"	September 5, 2019	0.4/2	2.08	0.1	0.21	0.5	2.20
10	"Ponce Family"	September 5, 2019	0.4/2	2.08	0.1	0.24	0.5	2.41

== See also ==
- Lists of game shows
