= Balázs Sebestyén =

- Born: Balázs Ottó Sebestyén; 18 July 1977 (age 49)
- Origin: Budapest, Hungary
- Occupations: Television presenter; radio presenter
- Years active: 1999–present

Balázs Ottó Sebestyén (born 18 July 1977) is a Hungarian television presenter and winner of multiple "Story Ötcsillag" prizes.

== Shows ==
Sebestyén began his career as presenter of a music request program. Since then, he has done a big number of variety shows mainly on RTL Klub.

In addition to many radio-television deal he signed a major breakfast show on Class FM with János Vadon and Ferenc Rákóczi.

Hungarian name	Original format/English name	Channel	Year	Role
Television
Megálló	Stop	Z+, VIVA+	1997–2003	Host
Balázs show	Balázs show	RTL Klub	2003–2008	Host
Sztárbox	Starbox	RTL Klub	2004	Host
Kísértés	Temptation Island	RTL Klub	2004	Host
New York Poker Open	New York Poker Open	RTL Klub	2007	Host
Pókerarc	PokerFace	RTL Klub	2008	Host
Celeb vagyok, ments ki innen!	I'm a Celebrity...Get Me Out of Here!	RTL Klub	2008–2014, 2022	Host
A széf	Take It or Leave It	RTL Klub	2007–2012	Host
Kész átverés	Total Scam	RTL Klub	2008–2009	Host
Kalandra Fal!	Hole in the Wall	RTL Klub	2009	Host
X-Faktor (Season 1)	The X Factor	RTL Klub	2010	Host
Való Világ (Season 4-5)	Real World	RTL Klub	2010–2012	Host
Szerelem a legfelsőbb szinteken	Love in highest level	RTL Klub	2011	Host
1 perc és nyersz!	Minute to win it	RTL Klub	2012-2017	Host
A kód	The Exit List	RTL Klub	2012	Host
Vundersőn és Zuperszexi	Ant & Dec's Saturday Night Takeaway	RTL Klub	2013	Host
4N4LN – A családi játszma	Family Feud	RTL Klub	2014	Host
Gyertek át szombat este!	Hollywood Game Night	RTL Klub	2015-2019	Host
Hungary's Got Talent	Got Talent	RTL Klub	2015	Host
Kicsi óriások	Pequeños Gigantes USA	RTL Klub	2016	Host
Nyerő páros	Winning Couple	RTL Klub	2016-2021	Host
A Fal	The Wall	RTL Klub	2017-2018	Host
Álarcos énekes	Masked Singer	RTL Klub	2020	Judge
Radio				
Reggeli Torma	Breakfast horse-radish	Radio DeeJay	2004–2006	Host
Pirítós!	Toast!	Danubius Rádió	2009	Host
Morning Show	Morning Show	Class FM	2009-2016	Host
Reggeli Show	Breakfast Show	Rádió 1	2017-present	Host

== Personal life ==
He was married in summer of 2009 to Viktória Horváth. They have two children Benett and Noel Sebestyén.

== Books ==
- 2008: Sebestyén Balázs: "Szigorúan bizalmas"(Strictly Confidential) (Published by I.A.T. - ISBN 978-963-9885-01-1)- in support of the Gast Royal.

== Awards ==
- 2008 Story Ötcsillag award, Best Presenter
- 2009 Story Ötcsillag award, Best Presenter
