= Rafael Araneda =

Popular Chilean TV presenter (born 1969)

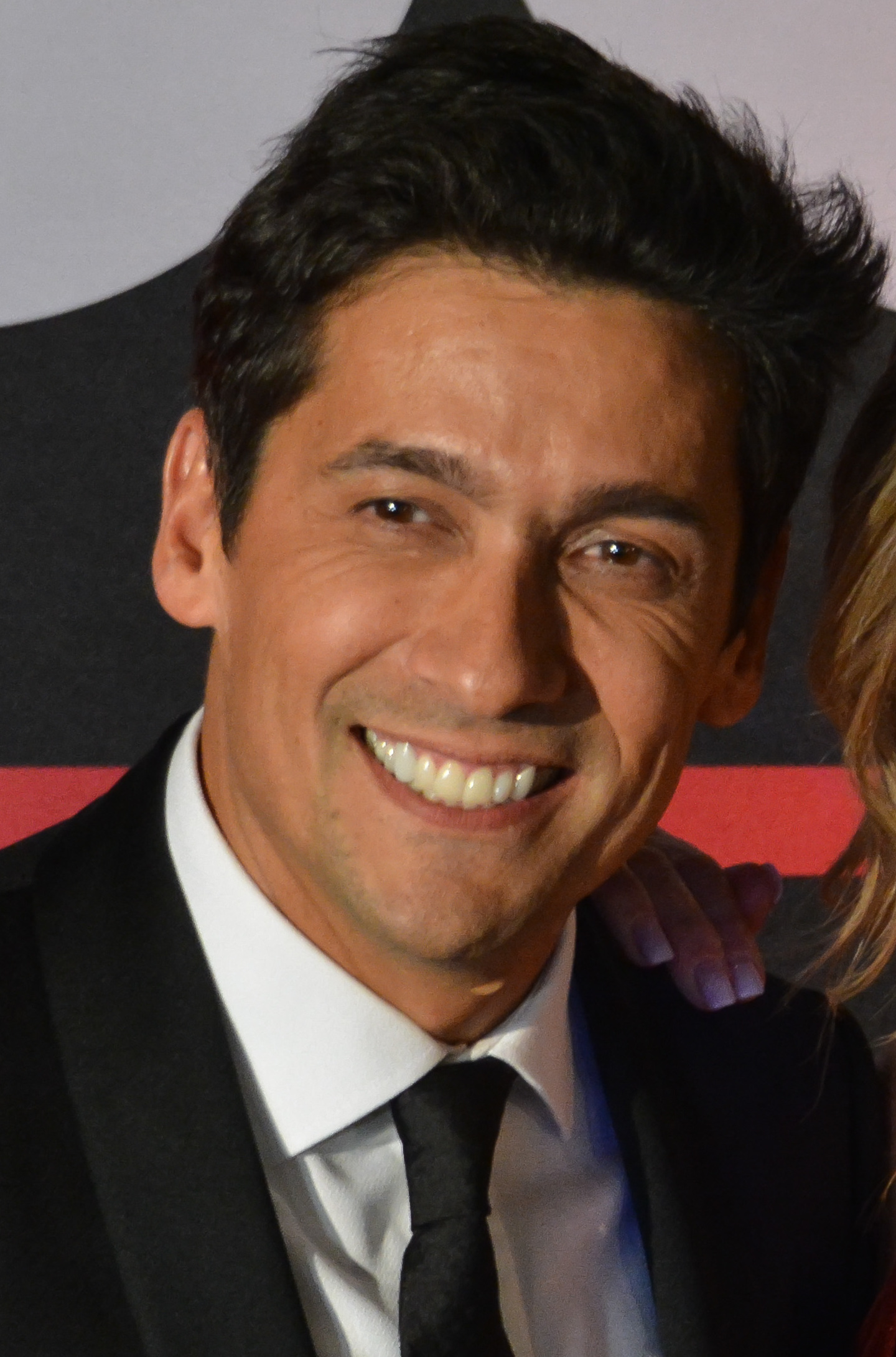
- Born: Rafael Luis Araneda Maturana; September 18, 1969 (age 56); Santiago, Chile
- Occupation: TV presenter

Rafael Luis Araneda Maturana (born September 18, 1969, in Santiago) is a Chilean TV host, best known for his participation in the show Rojo Fama Contrafama as the host. Also he was the host of Estrellas en el Hielo, Sin Prejuicios, Rojo VIP, Noche de Juegos, El Baile en TVN (Chilean version of Strictly Come Dancing by the BBC). Rafael Araneda is married to the hostess Marcela Vacarezza Etcheverry with whom he has three children.

Araneda started his career in La Red being the host of Revolviéndola (1997). Is one of the biggest collaborators of the Teletón and is one of the best friends of Mario Kreutzberger "Don Francisco". Recently was the host of Todos a Coro with Karen Doggenweiler and Pelotón III.Currently works in Pelotón IV'.

He hosted La Academia Mexico Season 6, 7, 8 & 9. As of 2022, Araneda works in the United States on a Univision television show named Enamorandonos USA.

== Filmography ==
=== Television ===
Year	Title	Network	Role
2002-2008	Rojo	TVN	Host
2008-2011	La Academia	Azteca 13	Host
2010-2018	Festival Viña Del Mar	Chilevision	Host
2025–present	Festival Viña Del Mar	Mega	Host
2018	The Wall	Chilevision	Host
2019–present	Enamorándonos	Unimás	Host
