= Patrick Duffy =

American actor (born 1949)

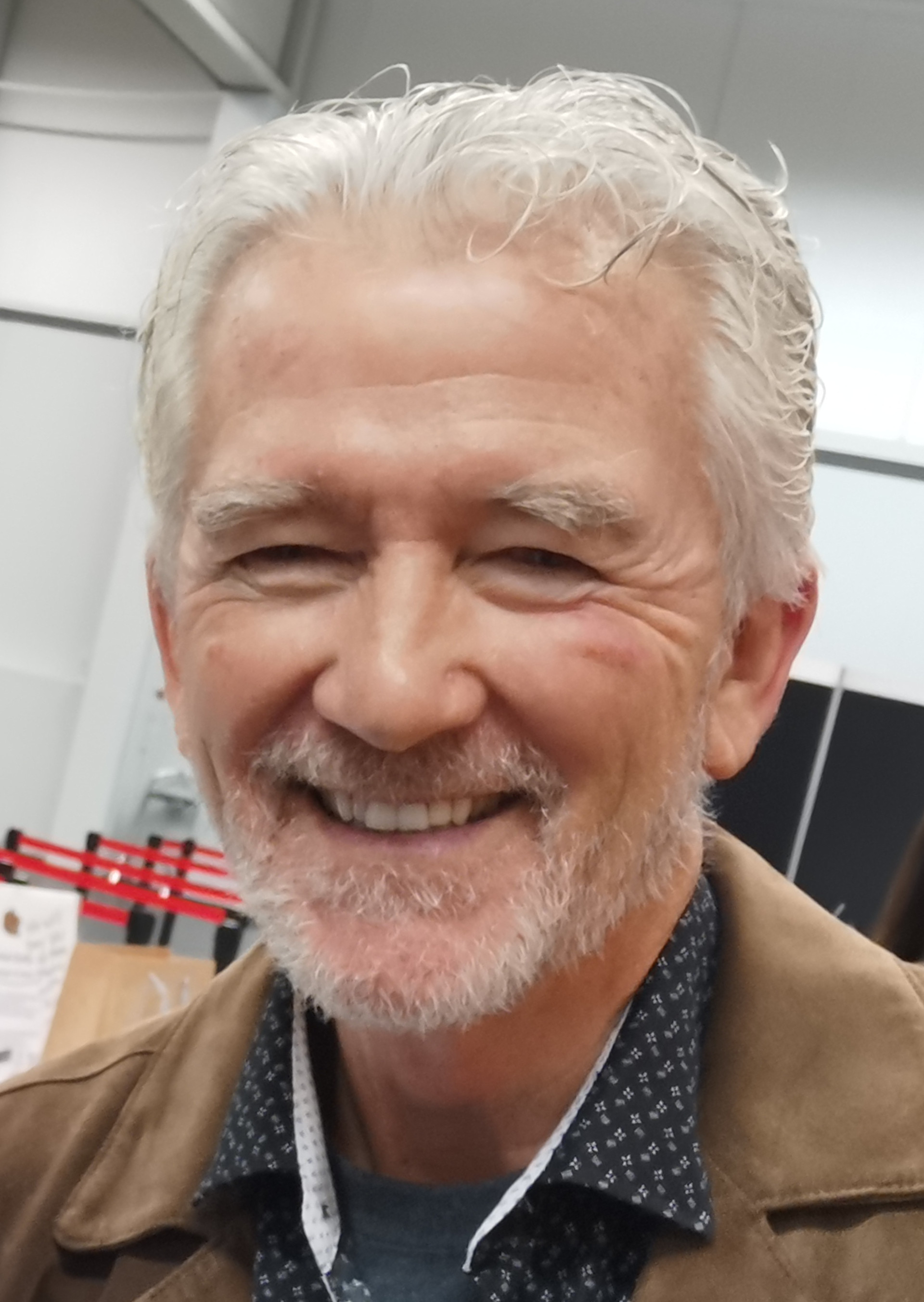
- Duffy in 2022
- Born: March 17, 1949 (age 77); Townsend, Montana, U.S.
- Education: University of Washington (BA)
- Occupations: Actor, director, television personality
- Years active: 1974–present
- Known for: Bobby Ewing – Dallas
- Spouse: Carlyn Rosser (m. 1974; died 2017)
- Partner(s): Linda Purl (2020–present)
- Children: 2
- Relatives: Barry Zito (nephew)
- Website: www.patrickduffy.org

Patrick Duffy (born March 17, 1949) is an American television actor and director widely known for his role as Bobby Ewing on the CBS primetime soap opera Dallas (1978–1991). Duffy returned to reprise his role as Bobby in a continuation of Dallas, which aired on TNT from 2012 to 2014. He is also well known for his role on the ABC sitcom Step by Step as Frank Lambert from 1991 to 1998, and for his role as Stephen Logan on the CBS daytime soap opera The Bold and the Beautiful (2006–2011, 2022, 2023). Duffy played the lead character's father in the 2014 NBC sitcom Welcome to Sweden.

== Early life ==
Duffy was born in Townsend, Montana, in 1949, the son of tavern owners, Patrick Mor Terence and Marie Duffy (née Dawson). Duffy is of Irish ancestry. During high school, Duffy was living in Everett, Washington, and attended Cascade High School. At Cascade, he participated in the Drama Club and the Pep Club, for which he was a Yell King. Academically, Duffy graduated from the University of Washington in 1971 with a degree in drama. He ruptured both his vocal cords during his senior year of college, but was hired as an actor-in-residence, where he worked as an interpreter for ballet, opera, and orchestra companies in Washington. He also taught mime and movement classes during this period. In a 2021 interview with David A. Weiner, Duffy credits his sister, an international champion diver, with teaching him the necessary swimming techniques for his first career break. She became a police officer in Seattle.

== Career ==
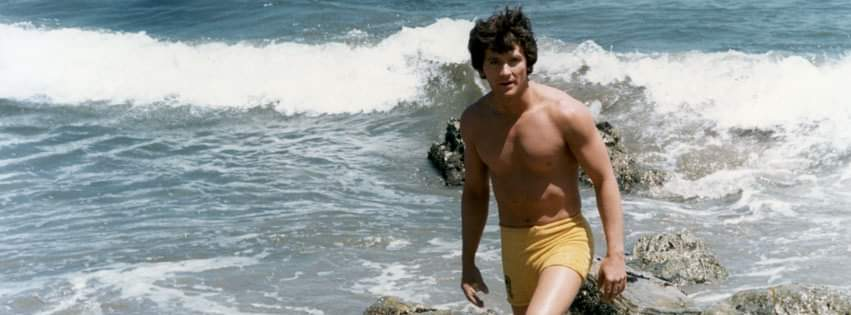
Duffy as Mark Harris in Man from Atlantis

Duffy appeared in a Taco Bell commercial in the early 1970s, playing an employee describing an Enchirito. In 1977, he landed the role of Mark Harris in the short-lived television series Man from Atlantis. Following the series' cancellation in early 1978, he got his big break in the role of Bobby Ewing, opposite Barbara Bel Geddes and Larry Hagman, on the prime-time soap opera Dallas. The show became a worldwide success. Despite its success, Duffy opted to leave the series in 1985 with his character being killed off onscreen. However, with both the show and his career on the decline, he returned in 1986 in the famous shower scene that rendered the entire 1985–1986 season "just a dream." Duffy then remained with the series until its cancellation in 1991. He also appeared in several episodes of the spin-off series Knots Landing between 1979 and 1982. Throughout the 13-year run of Dallas, Duffy directed several episodes of the series. Along with Dallas fame, Duffy has also tried his hand at singing, and in 1983, he had a hit in Europe with Together We're Strong, a duet with French female singer Mireille Mathieu. The single reached No. 5 in the Netherlands in April 1983.

At the end of Dallas' run in 1991, Duffy began another television role, as Frank Lambert on the family sitcom, Step by Step in which he co-starred with Suzanne Somers. The series ran until 1998, and Duffy also directed numerous episodes. Also in the 1990s, he appeared in two Dallas reunion television films; J.R. Returns (1996) and War of the Ewings (1998), both of which he also co-produced. He has reunited on several occasions with many of his Dallas co-stars both onscreen and off, most notably for the non-fiction television special Dallas Reunion: The Return to Southfork in 2004. Duffy later continued to act in occasional guest or voice acting appearances, including the series Family Guy (in which he appeared in a live action scene with Victoria Principal as they spoofed the Dallas shower scene), as well as Justice League and Touched by an Angel. Duffy starred in the television films Falling in Love with the Girl Next Door and Desolation Canyon. In 2006, he began a recurring role on the daytime soap opera The Bold and the Beautiful as Stephen Logan. From April to July 2008, he hosted Bingo America, a partially interactive game show on GSN.

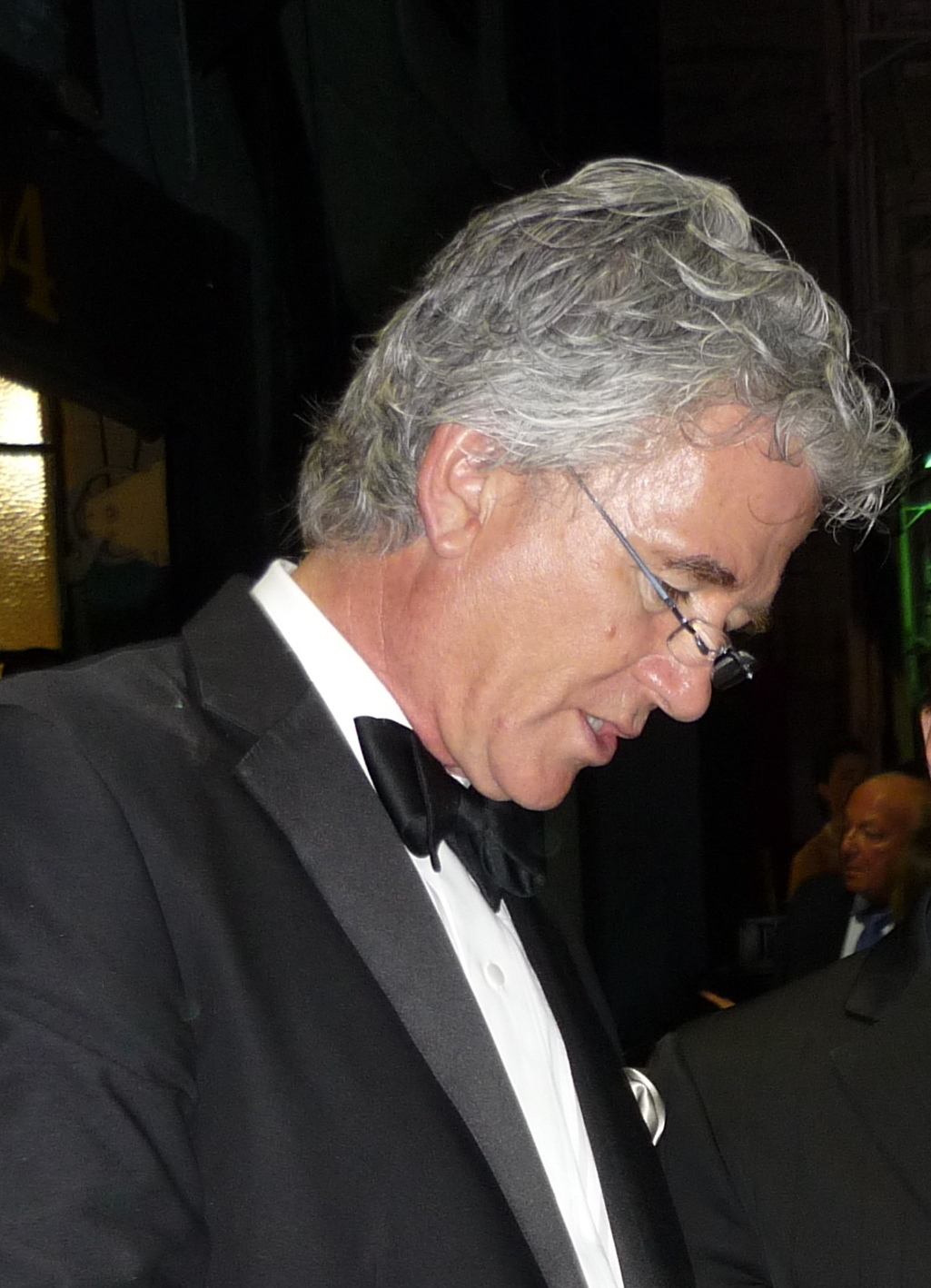
Duffy at 2009 Daytime Emmy Award

Duffy reprised his role as Bobby Ewing in TNT's continuation series of Dallas. The series aired from 2012 to 2014.

Duffy played a surreal double of Bobby Ewing in the experimental documentary Hotel Dallas, directed by artist duo Ungur & Huang. The film premiered at the 2016 Berlin International Film Festival.

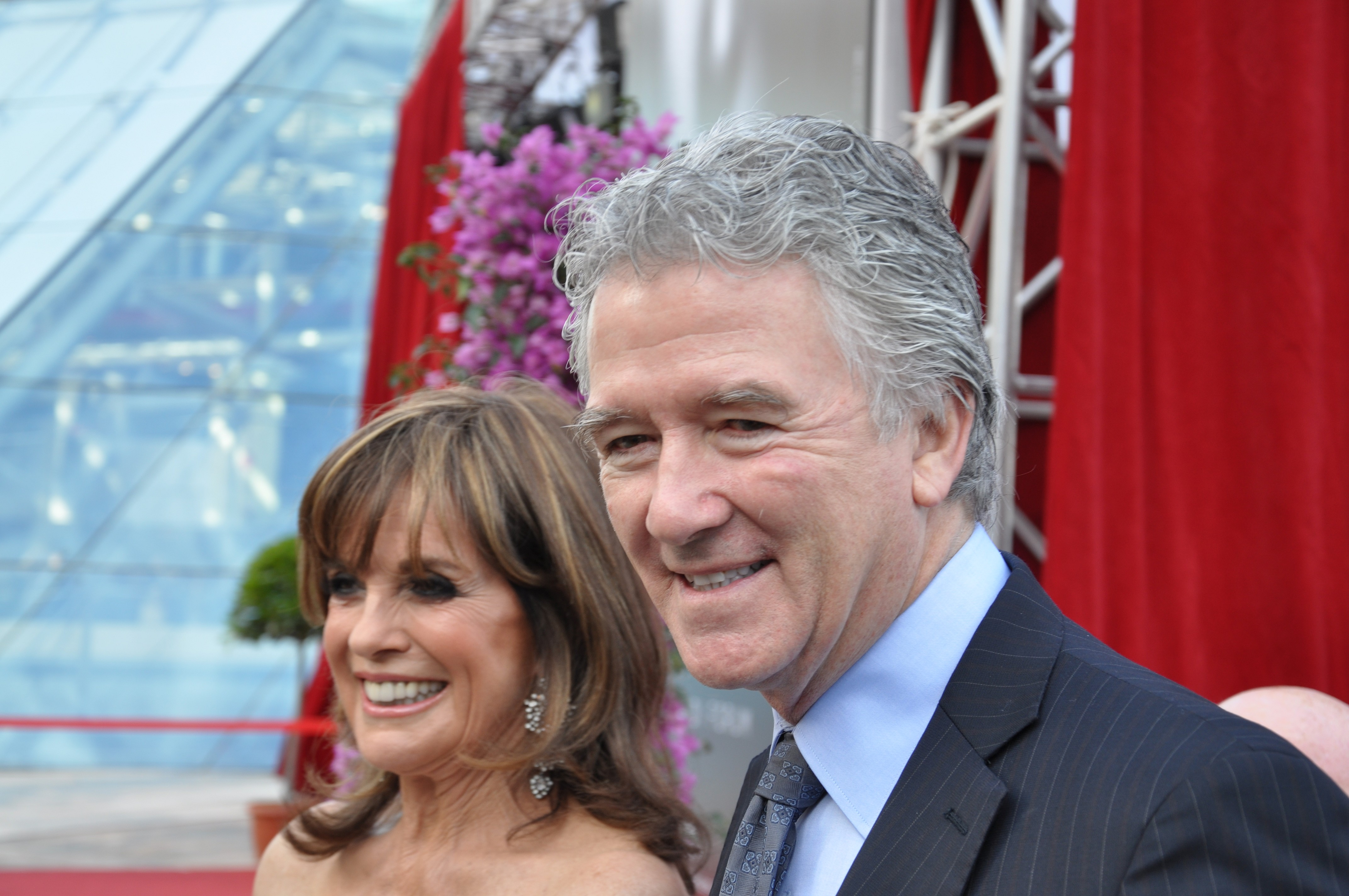
Duffy with Linda Gray at the 2013 Monte-Carlo Television Festival

== Personal life ==
Duffy married Carlyn Rosser, a professional ballerina, in 1974. She danced with the First Chamber Dance Company of New York. The Duffys lived near Eagle Point, Oregon, with their sons.

Introduced to Buddhism by his wife, Duffy converted to Nichiren Buddhism and began chanting Nam Myōhō Renge Kyō. He and his family are longtime members of the Buddhist organization Soka Gakkai International.

On November 18, 1986, Duffy's parents were murdered at their tavern in Boulder, Montana, by two young men, Kenneth Miller and Sean Wentz, during an armed robbery. Wentz and Miller, who were teenagers at the time, were convicted of the murders and sentenced to 75 years in prison. In 2001, Miller appeared before the Montana Parole board after Wentz recanted his original story and admitted that he, Wentz, was the sole gunman. Miller was denied clemency in 2001 but was released on parole in December 2007. Wentz was granted parole in 2015.

Duffy's wife Carlyn Rosser died in 2017. In 2020, he entered into a relationship with actress Linda Purl.

== Filmography ==
Year	Title	Role	Notes
1974	The Stranger Who Looks Like Me	Adoptee #3	Television film
1974	Hurricane	Jim	Television film
1976	Switch	Sgt. Musial	Episode: "The Walking Bomb"
1976	The Last of Mrs. Lincoln	Lewis Baker	Television film
1977	Man from Atlantis	Mark Harris	Television film
1977	Man from Atlantis: The Death Scouts	Mark Harris	Television film
1977	Man from Atlantis: Killer Spores	Mark Harris	Television film
1977	Man from Atlantis: The Disappearances	Mark Harris	Television film
1977–1978	Man from Atlantis	Mark Harris	Series regular
1978–1985 & 1986–1991	Dallas	Bobby Ewing	Series regular & Director; Soap Opera Digest Award for Outstanding Actor in a Prime Time Serial (1985); Special Bambi Award (Shared with Dallas co-stars) (1987); TV Land Pop Culture Award (Shared with Dallas co-stars) (2006); Nominated - Soap Opera Digest Award for Outstanding Actor in a Prime Time (1988, 1990, 1992); Nominated - Soap Opera Digest Award for Favorite Super Couple: Prime Time (Shared with Victoria Principal) (1988)
1979–1982	Knots Landing	Bobby Ewing	3 episodes
1980	Charlie's Angels	William Cord	Episode: "One Love...Two Angels"
1980	Enola Gay: The Men, the Mission, the Atomic Bomb	Colonel Paul Tibbets	Television film
1981	The Love Boat	Ralph Sutton	Episode: "The Expedition"
1982	Cry for the Strangers	Dr. Brad Russell	Television film
1984	Vamping	Harry Baranski	
1985	From Here to Maternity	Henderson	Television film
1985	Hotel	Richard Martin	Episode: "Missing Pieces"
1985	George Burns Comedy Week		Episode: "Dream, Dream, Dream"
1985	Alice in Wonderland	The Goat	Television film
1986	Strong Medicine	Dr. Andrew Jordan	Television film
1987	Our House	Johnny Witherspoon	Episode: "Candles and Shadows"
1988	14 Going on 30	Actor in Black and White Movie	Television film
1988	Unholy Matrimony	John Dillman	Television film
1988	Too Good to Be True	Richard Harland	Television film
1990	Murder C.O.D.	Steve Murtaugh	Television film
1990	Children of the Bride	John Hix	Television film
1990	Newhart	Patrick Duffy	Episode: "Lights! Camera! Contractions!"; uncredited
1991	Daddy	Oliver Watson	Television film
1991–1998	Step by Step	Frank Lambert	Series regular & Director
1992	Goof Troop	Harold Hatchback	Voice, episode: "Buddy Building"
1994	Texas	Stephen Austin	Television film
1996	Dallas: J.R. Returns	Bobby Ewing	Television film
1997	Heart of Fire	Max Tucker	Television film
1998	Dallas: War of the Ewings	Bobby Ewing	Television film
1998	Rusty: A Dog's Tale	Cap the Dog	Voice
1998	Diagnosis: Murder	Wayde Garrett	Episode: "Till Death Do Us Part"
1999	Dead Man's Gun	Lyman Gage	Episode: "The Womanizer"
1999	Don't Look Behind You	Jeff Corrigan	Television film
1999	Twice in a Lifetime	Peter Hogan	Episode: "A Match Made in Heaven"
1999–2001	Family Guy	Bobby Ewing, Jack, Salesman, Teacher	Voice, 2 episodes
2000	The Secret Adventures of Jules Verne	Duke Angelo Rimini	Episode: "Rockets of the Dead"
2000	Perfect Game	Coach Bobby Geiser	Television film
2002	Justice League	Steve Trevor	Voice, episode: "The Savage Time"
2003	Touched by an Angel	Mike	Episode: "I Will Walk with You"
2004	Reba	Dr. Joe Baker	Episode: "Couples' Therapy"
2004	Dallas Reunion: The Return to Southfork	Himself / Bobby Ewing	TV special
2006	Desolation Canyon	Sheriff Tomas 'Swede' Lundstrom	Television film
2006	Falling in Love with the Girl Next Door	James Connolly	Television film
2006–2011 & 2022–2023	The Bold and the Beautiful	Stephen Logan	Series regular
2007	Walk Hard: The Dewey Cox Story	Himself	Uncredited cameo (unrated version)
2008	He's Such a Girl	Whitney's Father	
2008	Bingo America	Host	Game Show
2009	Love Takes Wing	Mayor Evans	Television film
2010	Healing Hands	Uncle Norman	Television film
2010	You Again	Ritchie Phillips	
2010	Pony Exce$$	Narrator	Documentary
2010	Party Down	Himself	Episode: "Constance Carmell Wedding"
2010	Tim and Eric Awesome Show, Great Job!	Himself	
2012–2014	Dallas	Bobby Ewing	Series regular & Director
2012	Lovin' Lakin	Himself	Episode: "Lakin Visits Her Dad"
2014–2015	Welcome to Sweden	Wayne Evans	4 episodes
2015	The Fosters	Robert Quinn Sr.	Episode: "The End of the Beginning"
2017	The Christmas Cure	Bruce Turner	Television film
2017	Trafficked	Christian	
2018	Christmas with a View	Frank Haven	Television film
2018	American Housewife	Marty	Episode: "Saving Christmas"
2019	The Cool Kids	Gene	Episode: "Margaret Ups Her Game"
2019	Station 19	Terry	Episode: "Into the Wildfire"
2019	The Mistletoe Secret	Mack Eubanks	Television film
2019	Random Acts of Christmas	Howard	Television film
2019	April, May and June	April's Father	
2020	All Rise	Ed Parker	Episode: "What the Constitution Greens to Me"
2020	NCIS	Ret. Lieutenant Commander Jack Briggs	Episode: "Flight Plan"
2020	Once Upon a Main Street	Elder Dubois	Television film
2020	Alley of Brandt	Master of Time	Short
2021	Lady of the Manor	Grayson Wadsworth	
2021	Doomsday Mom	Larry Woodcock	Television film
2021	On the Verge	Gene	Episodes: "Viva Italia!", "Lip Wax"
2021	The Christmas Promise	Pops	Television film
2024–2025	The Family Business	Sheriff KD Shrugs	9 episodes
2025	Hollywood Grit	Clarence	
