= Andrew Glassman =

American television producer

Andrew Glassman is an American television producer. Glassman founded the production company Glassman Media in 2001 following his successful career as an Emmy Award-winning investigative Broadcast Journalist during which he appeared on-air at NBC News, CNBC, MSNBC, WCAU, and WNBC.

In 2019, Glassman Media was acquired by Endeavor Content, a division of Endeavor.

== Credits ==
=== Primetime Gameshows ===
Glassman's credits include two Primetime Game shows, FOX's game show Spin the Wheel, produced in partnership with Justin Timberlake’s production company Tennman Entertainment and NBC's game show The Wall, produced in partnership with LeBron James's production company SpringHill Entertainment.

=== Unscripted Series ===
Glassman's dating show credits include four seasons of CMT's Sweet Home Alabama, two seasons of WeTV's Match Made in Heaven, and four seasons of NBC's Average Joe.

Other Glassman Credits include ABC's reboot of Battle of the Network Stars, Three Wishes (NBC), Death Valley (CMT), and GSN's Bingo America.

=== INSP Network ===
Glassman has also produced 4 original series for the INSP Network including Guts and Glory, The Cowboy Way: Alabama, Turquoise Fever, and Ultimate Cowboy Showdown.

Guts and Glory is a competition series hosted by rodeo star, J.B. Mauney, following rodeo competitors all trying to prove themselves in order to win a chance to compete at the American Rodeo.

The Cowboy Way: Alabama is a docuseries following the lives of 3 modern day cowboys. The 7th season will be airing in 2020.

Turquoise Fever, a turquoise mining docuseries premiered its first season in 2019. The series follows the Otteson family who hold claims to many mines in the Nevada desert.

Ultimate Cowboy Showdown, hosted by Trace Adkins, premiered in 2019 and currently has three seasons. The series puts 12 cowboys and cowgirls head-to-head to test their strength, grit, and endurance with the hopes of naming the Ultimate Cowboy.

== International Formats ==
Glassman's game show The Wall has international formats in over 30 territories around the world including France, Germany, England. and Romania. The Wall is the most travelled new format of 2017 and 2018.

In 2019, France's network TF1 commissioned episodes of the game show Spin the Wheel, produced by Glassman Media and Justin Timberlake's production company Tennman Entertainment.

== Awards ==
2018 NATPE Unscripted Breakthrough Awards - The Wall was the game-show winner.

2019 C21Media International Format Awards - The Wall won Best Studio-Based Gameshow Format.

2021 Real Screen Awards - The Wall won Best Competition Game or Quiz Show

2022 Real Screen Awards - The Wall won Best Competition Game or Quiz Show

== News Story Samples ==
Glassman's coverage of Grays Ferry beatings, a racially charged story, is seen as controversial. Glassman states that his coverage of the event was, "fair and accurate".
