= List of Sony Pictures Television programs =

This is a list of television series produced, distributed or owned by Sony Pictures Television, a Sony Pictures Entertainment company.

== Sony Pictures Television ==
Formerly known as Screen Gems (1948–74), Columbia Pictures Television (1974–2001), Columbia TriStar Television (1994–2001) and Columbia TriStar Domestic Television (2001–2002).

Title	Original run	Network	Notes
The Ford Television Theatre	1948–57	CBS/NBC/ABC	First series to be produced by Screen Gems
The George Burns and Gracie Allen Show	1950–58	CBS	distribution only; produced by McCadden Productions; Screen Gems acquired syndication rights after McCadden Productions dissolved
The Adventures of Wild Bill Hickok	1951–58	Syndication/CBS	Screen Gems filmed the final 13 episodes in 1958 after acquiring the rights from sponsor Kellogg's Cereals and producer William F. Broidy
Captain Midnight	1954–56	CBS	
Father Knows Best	1954–60	CBS/NBC	co-production with Rodney-Young Productions
The Adventures of Rin Tin Tin	1954–59	ABC	co-production with Herbert B. Leonard Productions
Tales of the Texas Rangers	1955–58	CBS/ABC	
Celebrity Playhouse	1955–56	Syndication	
Damon Runyon Theater	1955–56	CBS	co-production with Normandle Television Pictures Inc.
Treasure Hunt	1956–59	ABC/NBC	co-production with Jantone Productions
Tales of the 77th Bengal Lancers	1956–57	NBC	co-production with Lancer Productions Limited
The Gerald McBoing-Boing Show	1956–57	CBS	co-production with UPA Pictures Inc. (Note: Currently owned by NBCUniversal through DreamWorks Animation; certain shorts still owned by Columbia Pictures.)
Circus Boy	1956–58	NBC/ABC	co-production with Norbert Productions
Playhouse 90	1956–60	CBS	co-production with Filmaster Productions
Ranch Party	1957	Syndication	co-production with Briskin-Ranch Party Productions
The George Sanders Mystery Theater	1957	NBC	co-production with Bischoff-Diamond Productions
The Web	1957	NBC	co-production with Mark Goodson-Bill Todman Productions
Casey Jones	1957–58	Syndication	distribution only; produced by Briskin Productions
Goodyear Theatre	1957–60	NBC	co-production with Mark Goodson-Bill Todman Productions
Alcoa Theatre	1957–60	NBC	co-production with Four Star Television and Showcase Productions
The Ruff and Reddy Show	1957–60	NBC	distribution only; produced by H-B Enterprises (Note: Currently owned by Warner Bros. Television Studios.)
Ivanhoe	1958–59	ITV	distribution only; produced by Sydney Productions
Shirley Temple's Storybook	1958–61	NBC	co-production with Henry Jaffe Enterprises Inc.
Jefferson Drum	1958–59	NBC	co-production with Mark Goodson-Bill Todman Productions
Decision	1958	NBC	
Rescue 8	1958–60	Syndication	co-production with Cinefilm and Wilbert Productions
The Donna Reed Show	1958–66	ABC	co-production with Todon-Briskin Productions
The Ed Wynn Show	1958–59	NBC	co-production with Thalia-Keethwyn Productions
Naked City	1958–63	ABC	co-production with Shelle Productions
Behind Closed Doors	1958–59	NBC	co-production with Jane Gallu Productions Inc.
The Huckleberry Hound Show	1958–61	Syndication	distribution only; produced by Hanna-Barbera Productions
Manhunt	1959–61	Syndication	produced by Briskin Productions
Tightrope	1959–60	CBS	co-production with Greene-Rouse Productions
Dennis the Menace	1959–63	CBS	co-production with Darriell Productions
The Man from Blackhawk	1959–60	ABC	co-production with Stuart-Oliver Inc.
The Quick Draw McGraw Show	1959–61	Syndication	distribution only; produced by Hanna-Barbera Productions
My Sister Eileen	1960–61	NBC	Based on the 1942 film of the same name and its 1955 film remake by Columbia Pictures
Dan Raven	1960–61	NBC	
Two Faces West	1960–61	Syndication	
Route 66	1960–64	CBS	co-production with Lancer-Edling Productions
The Flintstones	1960–66	ABC	distribution only; produced by Hanna-Barbera Productions
The Yogi Bear Show	1961–62	Syndication	distribution only; produced by Hanna-Barbera Productions
Tallahassee 7000	1961	Syndication	co-production with Lenwill Productions
Top Cat	1961–62	ABC	distribution only; produced by Hanna-Barbera Productions
Hazel	1961–66	NBC/CBS	
The Hathaways	1961–62	ABC	co-production with Gloucester Productions
Shannon	1961–62	Syndication	
The Hanna-Barbera New Cartoon Series	1962–63	Syndication	distribution only; produced by Hanna-Barbera Productions
The Jetsons	1962–63	ABC	distribution only; produced by Hanna-Barbera Productions
Empire	1962–63	NBC	co-production with Eaves Movie Ranch and Wilrich Productions
Mr. Smith Goes to Washington	1962–63	ABC	co-production with Starstan-Fespar Productions; Based on the 1939 film by Columbia Pictures
Our Man Higgins	1962–63	ABC	co-production with First Company of Writers
Grindl	1963–64	NBC	co-production with David Swift Productions
Redigo	1963–64	NBC	co-production with Wilrich Productions
The Farmer's Daughter	1963–66	ABC	Based on the 1947 film by RKO Pictures
The Magilla Gorilla Show	1964–65	Syndication	distribution only; produced by Hanna-Barbera Productions
Jeopardy!	1964–79; 1984–present	NBC; Syndication	continued from Merv Griffin Enterprises co-production with Jeopardy Productions, Inc. Distributed by King World (1984–2007) and CBS Media Ventures (2007–present)
The Peter Potamus Show	1964–66	Syndication/ABC	distribution only; produced by Hanna-Barbera Productions
Bewitched	1964–72	ABC	co-production with Ashmont Productions (1971–72)
Jonny Quest	1964–65	ABC	distribution only; produced by Hanna-Barbera Productions
Gidget	1965–66	ABC	Based on the 1959 film by Columbia Pictures
Camp Runamuck	1965–66	NBC	co-production with Runamuck Productions
Paradise Bay	1965–66	NBC	co-production with Corday Productions
I Dream of Jeannie	1965–70	NBC	co-production with Sidney Sheldon Productions
Morning Star	1965–66	NBC	co-production with Corday Productions
The Wackiest Ship in the Army	1965–66	NBC	co-production with Herbert Margolis Productions and Joseph M. Schenck Productions
The Soupy Sales Show	1965–66	WNYW	distribution only; produced by WNYW New York
Days of Our Lives	1965–present	NBC/Peacock	co-production with Corday Productions
The Dating Game	1965–74; 1978–80; 1986–89; 1996–99; 2021	ABC; Syndication	continued from Barris Productions co-production with Passion Films and Hard Rock Media (2021)
The Newlywed Game	1966–74; 1977–80; 1984–89; 1996–99; 2009–13	ABC; Syndication; Game Show Network	continued from Barris Productions co-production with Embassy Row (2009–2013)
Love on a Rooftop	1966–67	ABC	
Hawk	1966	ABC	
The Monkees	1966–68	NBC	co-production with Raybert Productions
Iron Horse	1966–68	ABC	co-production with Dagonet Productions
Occasional Wife	1966–67	NBC	
Adventures of the Seaspray	1967	ABC	co-production with Pacific Films
The Flying Nun	1967–70	ABC	
The Second Hundred Years	1967–68	ABC	
The Outcasts	1968–69	ABC	
Here Come the Brides	1968–70	ABC	
The Ugliest Girl in Town	1968–69	ABC	
Playboy After Dark	1969–70	Syndication	co-production with Playboy Enterprises
The Johnny Cash Show	1969–71	ABC	
Mr. Deeds Goes to Town	1969–70	ABC	Based on the 1936 film by Columbia Pictures
The Everly Brothers Show	1970	ABC	co-production with Halcyon Productions
Nancy	1970–71	NBC	co-production with Sidney Sheldon Productions
The Young Rebels	1970–71	ABC	
The Partridge Family	1970–74	ABC	
The Interns	1970–71	CBS	
Getting Together	1971–72	ABC	co-production with Thornhill Productions Inc.
The Good Life	1971–72	NBC	co-production with Humble Productions and Lorimar Television (Note: Distributed by Sony Pictures Television; Warner Bros. owns the program's copyrights.)
Ghost Story	1972–73	NBC	co-production with William Castle Productions
The Joker's Wild	1972–75; 1977–86; 1990–91; 2017–19	CBS; Syndication; TBS/TNT	continued from Jack Barry Productions (1972–75, 1990–91), Barry & Enright Productions (1977–86) and Kline and Friends, Inc. (1990–91) co-production with Studio T, SMAC Entertainment, and Snoopadelic Films (2017–19)
Temperatures Rising	1972–74	ABC	co-produced with Ashmont Productions
The Paul Lynde Show	1972–73	ABC	co-produced with Ashmont Productions
Bridget Loves Bernie	1972–73	CBS	co-production with The Douglas S. Cramer Company and Thornhill Productions
The Young and the Restless	1973–present	CBS	co-production with Bell Dramatic Serial Company and Corday Productions
Jeannie	1973	CBS	co-production with Hanna-Barbera Productions; Based on the live-action series I Dream of Jeannie
The Girl with Something Extra	1973–74	NBC	co-production with Thornhill Productions
Needles and Pins	1973	NBC	
Police Story	1973–79	NBC	co-production by David Gerber Productions
Bob & Carol & Ted & Alice	1973	ABC	Based on the 1969 film by Columbia Pictures; Last series produced under the name "Screen Gems"
That's My Mama	1974–75	ABC	co-production with Blye-Bearde Productions (season 1) and Pollock/Davis, Inc. (season 2); First series produced under the name "Columbia Pictures Television"
Partridge Family 2200 A.D.	1974–75	CBS	co-production with Hanna-Barbera Productions; Based on the live-action series The Partridge Family
Born Free	1974	NBC	co-production with David Gerber Productions and Paul Radin Productions; Based on the 1966 film by Columbia Pictures
Police Woman	1974–78	NBC	co-produced by David Gerber Productions; Spin-off of Police Story
Nakia	1974	ABC	co-production with David Gerber Productions
Wheel of Fortune	1975–present	NBC/CBS/Syndication	continued from Merv Griffin Enterprises co-production with Califon Productions, Inc. Distributed by King World (1983–2007) and CBS Media Ventures (2007–present)
Medical Story	1975–76	NBC	co-production with David Gerber Productions
Joe Forrester	1975–76	NBC	co-production with David Gerber Productions
Matt Helm	1975–76	ABC	co-produced by Meadway Productions
Viva Valdez	1976	ABC	co-production with Rothman/Wohl Productions
Tabitha	1976–78	ABC	co-production with Ashmont Productions; Spin-off of Bewitched
The Quest	1976	NBC	co-production with David Gerber Productions
Gibbsville	1976	NBC	co-production with David Gerber Productions
The Feather and Father Gang	1976–77	ABC	co-production with Larry White Productions
The Fantastic Journey	1977	NBC	co-production with Bruce Lansbury Productions, Ltd.
Quark	1977–78	NBC	co-production with David Gerber Productions
Soap	1977–81	ABC	distribution only; produced by Witt/Thomas/Harris Productions
Free Country	1978	ABC	co-production with Reiner-Mishkin Productions
The American Girls	1978	CBS	co-production with Bennett/Katleman Productions
David Cassidy: Man Undercover	1978–79	NBC	co-production with David Gerber Productions
Salvage 1	1979	ABC	co-production with Bennett/Katleman Productions
Eischied	1979–80	NBC	co-production with David Gerber Productions
Benson	1979–86	ABC	distribution only; produced by Witt/Thomas/Harris Productions; Spin-off of Soap
The Life and Times of Eddie Roberts	1980	Syndication	co-production with Marcstone Productions
From Here to Eternity	1980	NBC	co-production with Bennett/Katleman Productions
The Stockard Channing Show	1980	CBS	co-production with Little Bear Productions
One in a Million	1980	ABC	co-production with TOY Productions
Walking Tall	1981	NBC	co-production with David Gerber Productions
Riker	1981	CBS	co-production with David Gerber Productions
Today's FBI	1981–82	ABC	co-production with David Gerber Productions
Mr. Merlin	1981–82	CBS	co-production with Larry Larry Productions
Code Red	1981–82	ABC	co-production with Irwin Allen Productions
Lewis & Clark	1981–82	NBC	distribution only; produced by Shapiro/West Productions, Rotunda Productions and Carson Productions
Goliath Awaits	1981	Syndication	miniseries; co-production with Larry White Productions and Gay-Jay
One of the Boys	1982	NBC	co-production with TOY II Productions
Cassie & Co.	1982	NBC	distribution only; produced by Saracen Productions and Carson Productions
Baker's Dozen	1982	CBS	co-production with Grosso-Jacobson Productions
Filthy Rich	1982–83	CBS	co-production with L.J. Bloodworth Productions and Larry White Productions
Bring 'Em Back Alive	1982–83	CBS	co-production with Schenck/Cardea Productions and Thompson/Bernstein/Boxleitner Productions
Teachers Only	1982–83	NBC	distribution only; produced by Andomar Productions (season 1), Larry Larry Company Productions (season 2) and Carson Productions
It Takes Two	1982–83	ABC	distribution only; produced by Witt/Thomas/Harris Productions
Ripley's Believe It or Not!	1982–86	ABC	co-production with Haley-Lyon Productions and Rastar Television
Malibu	1983	ABC	miniseries
Reggie	1983	ABC	co-production with Fox-Unicorn and Can't Sing Can't Dance Productions
Hardcastle and McCormick	1983–86	ABC	U.S. distribution only; produced by Stephen J. Cannell Productions
Jennifer Slept Here	1983–84	NBC	co-production with Larry Larry Productions
Riptide	1984–86	NBC	U.S. distribution only; produced by Stephen J. Cannell Productions
Blue Thunder	1984	ABC	co-production with Rastar Productions and Public Arts Inc. Based on the 1983 film by Columbia Pictures
Mickey Spillane's Mike Hammer	1984–87	CBS	co-production with Jay Bernstein Productions; Based on the revival series The New Mike Hammer in 1986
Mama Malone	1984	CBS	co-production with Barry & Enright Productions
Punky Brewster	1984–88	NBC/Syndication	Seasons 3–4 co-production with Lightkeeper Productions (Note: CPT bought the syndication rights and produced new episodes for first-run syndication, which NBC could not legally do because of then-in-place financial interest and syndication rules FCC regulations; Amazon MGM Studios (through NBCUniversal Syndication Studios) currently distributes the series outside of the U.S.)
Crazy Like a Fox	1984–86	CBS	co-production with Cardea-Schenk-Baskin-Shulman Productions
Jenny's War	1985	ITV	co-production with HTV, Louis Ruldolph Productions, and Operation Prime Time
Hell Town	1985	NBC	co-production with Mickey Productions
Stir Crazy	1985	CBS	co-production with Larry/Larry Productions; Based on the 1980 film by Columbia Pictures
Lime Street	1985	ABC	co-production with R.J. Productions and Bloodworth-Thomason Mozark Productions
What's Happening Now!!	1985–88	Syndication	co-production with LBS Communications; Sequel to the 1976 TV series What's Happening!! by TOY Productions
Alice in Wonderland	1985	miniseries; co-production with Irwin Allen Productions	
Fortune Dane	1986	ABC	distribution only; produced by The Rosenzweig Company, Stormy Weathers Productions and The Movie Company Enterprises
Melba	1986	CBS	co-production with Saul Ilson Productions
The Last Precinct	1986	NBC	distribution only; produced by Stephen J. Cannell Productions
Stingray	1986–87	NBC	distribution only; produced by Stephen J. Cannell Productions
The New Gidget	1986–88	Syndication	co-production with Ackerman/Riskin Productions; Sequel to Gidget; Based on the 1959 film by Columbia Pictures
Designing Women	1986–93	CBS	co-production with Bloodworth-Thomason Mozark Productions
The Real Ghostbusters	1986–91	ABC	co-production with DIC Enterprises; Season 1 distributed by/as Coca-Cola Telecommunications; Based on the 1984 film Ghostbusters by Columbia Pictures; Renamed Slimer! and the Real Ghostbusters for seasons 4–7
Starman	1986–87	ABC	co-production with Michael Douglas Productions and Henerson/Hirsch Productions Inc. Based on the 1984 film by Columbia Pictures
Dads	1986–87	ABC	co-production with Four and a Quarter Productions, Summa Enterprises Group and Victoria Productions
Sledge Hammer!	1986–88	ABC	U.S. television distribution since 1991; produced by New World Television, Alan Spencer Productions and D'Angelo Productions (1986–1987)
Houston Knights	1987–88	CBS	co-production with Jay Bernstein Productions
Tarby's Frame Game	1987	ITV	co-production with Yorkshire Television, Bernstein-Hovis Productions and Action Time
Dinosaucers	1987	Syndication	co-production with DIC Animation City and Lightyear Entertainment; as Coca-Cola Telecommunications
Sylvanian Families	1987	Syndication	co-production with DIC Animation City; as Coca-Cola Telecommunications (Note: Currently owned by WildBrain.)
Starcom: The U.S. Space Force	1987	Syndication	co-production with DIC Animation City; as Coca-Cola Telecommunications
New Monkees	1987	Syndication	co-production with Straybert Productions
Tour of Duty	1987–90	CBS	distribution since 1991; produced by New World Television and Zev Braun Productions
Something Is Out There	1988	NBC	co-production with Invader Productions, Inc. and Hoyts Productions
Seinfeld	1989–98	NBC	distribution only; produced by Giggling Goose Productions (pilot), Fred Barron Productions (season 1), West/Shapiro Productions and Castle Rock Entertainment
The Karate Kid	1989	NBC	co-production with DIC Animation City and Saban Entertainment; Based on the 1984 film and its sequel by Columbia Pictures
Peaceable Kingdom	1989	CBS	co-production with Victoria Productions
Hardball	1989–90	NBC	co-production with NBC Productions
Parker Lewis Can't Lose	1990–93	Fox	co-production with Clyde Phillips Productions; Renamed Parker Lewis in season 3
The Man in the Family	1991	ABC	co-production with The Weinberger Company
Eddie Dodd	1991	ABC	co-production with Lasker/Parkes Productions and Clyde Philips Productions
Baby Talk	1991–92	ABC	co-production with The Weinberger Company
Sibs	1991–92	ABC	co-production with Gracie Films
Raven	1992–93	CBS	
The Larry Sanders Show	1992–98	HBO	co-production with Brillstein-Grey Entertainment and Partners with Boundaries Productions
Mad About You	1992–99; 2019	NBC/Charter Spectrum	continued from TriStar Television co-production with Nuance Productions, In Front Productions (seasons 1–7), The Cloudland Company (season 8) and Comedy Dynamics (season 8)
Route 66	1993	NBC	co-production with Herbert B. Leonard Enterprises, Fabulous Lost Cities and Propaganda Films
Black Tie Affair	1993	NBC	co-production with Brillstein-Grey Entertainment
The Building	1993	CBS	co-production with Bob & Alice Productions, Worldwide Pants, and CBS Entertainment Productions
Thea	1993–94	ABC	distribution only; produced by Castle Rock Entertainment
The Second Half	1993–94	NBC	distribution only; produced by Castle Rock Entertainment
Ricki Lake	1993–2004	Syndication	co-production with The Garth Ancier Company
Walker, Texas Ranger	1993–2001	CBS	co-production with Cannon Television (1993), Top Kick Productions (seasons 1–5), Norris Brothers Entertainment (seasons 6–8), The Ruddy/Greif Company and CBS Productions
Moon Over Miami	1993	ABC	co-production with Harley Peyton TV and ABC Productions
Birdland	1994	ABC	co-production with Aerial Pictures
The Cosby Mysteries	1994–95	NBC	co-production with SAH Enterprises and NBC Productions
The Critic	1994–95	ABC/Fox	co-production with Gracie Films
Fortune Hunter	1994	Fox	co-production with BBK Productions
Party of Five	1994–2000	Fox	co-production with Keyser/Lippman Productions
Sweet Justice	1994–95	NBC	co-production with Trotwood Productions
Before They Were Stars	1994–96	ABC	co-production with Nash Entertainment, Scott Sternberg Productions and Katie Face Productions
Get Smart	1995	Fox	distribution only; produced by HBO Independent Productions; Sequel to the 1965 TV series by Talent Associates
The Tempestt Bledsoe Show	1995–96	Syndication	co-production with Dick Clark Productions
NewsRadio	1995–99	NBC	co-production with Brillstein-Grey Communications (seasons 1–4), Brillstein-Grey Entertainment (season 5) and 343 Incorporated
The Jeff Foxworthy Show	1995–97	ABC/NBC	co-production with Brillstein-Grey Communications and Mr. Willoughby, Inc.
Courthouse	1995	CBS	co-production with Kedzie Productions
The Naked Truth	1995–98	ABC/NBC	co-production with Brillstein-Grey Entertainment and Christopher Thompson Productions (season 1)
The Adventures of Hyperman	1995–96	CBS	co-production with Hyperion Animation and Illumination Studios
The Single Guy	1995–97	NBC	distribution only; with Hall of Production (season 1), NBC Productions (season 1), NBC Studios (season 2) and Castle Rock Entertainment
The Dana Carvey Show	1996	ABC	with Brillstein-Grey Communications
The Steve Harvey Show	1996–2002	The WB	co-production with Brillstein-Grey Communications (seasons 1–2), Brillstein-Grey Entertainment (seasons 3–4), Brad Grey Television (seasons 4–6), Universal Television (seasons 4–6), Winifred Hervey Productions and Stan Lathan Television
Jumanji	1996–99	UPN Kids/BKN	co-production with Adelaide Productions, Interscope Communications and Teitler Film; Based on the 1995 film by TriStar Pictures
Project G.e.e.K.e.R.	1996	CBS	co-production with Adelaide Productions and Doug²
Dark Skies	1996–97	NBC	co-production with Bryce Zabel Productions
Just Shoot Me!	1997–2003	NBC	co-production with Brillstein-Grey Communications (seasons 1–2), Brillstein-Grey Entertainment (seasons 3–4), Brad Grey Television (seasons 4–7), Universal Studios Network Programming (seasons 4–7) and Steven Levitan Productions
Lawless	1997	Fox	
Head over Heels	1997	UPN	co-production with Jeff Franklin Productions
Extreme Ghostbusters	1997	Syndication	co-production with Adelaide Productions
Wheel 2000	1997–98	CBS/Game Show Network	co-production with Scott Sternberg Productions and Trackdown Productions; Spin-off of Wheel of Fortune aimed at kids
Between Brothers	1997–99	Fox/UPN	co-production with O'Brien/Alu Productions and Alan Haymon Productions
The Gregory Hines Show	1997–98	CBS	co-production with Katlin/Bernstein Productions, Darric Productions and CBS Productions
The Tony Danza Show	1997–98	NBC	co-production with Katie Face Productions, Kokoro Productions and NBC Studios (Note: SPT distributes the series in North America only; NBC's stake in the series is distributed outside North America by Amazon MGM Studios (through NBCUniversal Syndication Studios).)
Over the Top	1997	ABC	co-production with Katlin/Bernstein Productions, Panamort Television and Greengrass Productions
Men in Black: The Series	1997–2001	Kids' WB	co-production with Adelaide Productions and Amblin Entertainment; Based on the 1997 film by Columbia Pictures
Channel Umptee-3	1997–98	Kids' WB	co-production with Adelaide Productions, Act III Productions and Enchanté George
Sleepwalkers	1997–98	NBC	co-production with NBC Studios; Based on the 1992 film of the same name by Columbia Pictures
Ask Harriet	1998	Fox	co-production with Bris Entertainment and Once a Frog Entertainment
Dawson's Creek	1998–2003	The WB	co-production with Outerbanks Entertainment
Jep!	1998–2000	Game Show Network	co-production with Scott Sternberg Productions; Spin-off of Jeopardy! aimed at kids
House Rules	1998	NBC	co-production with NBC Studios and Christopher Thompson Productions
Significant Others	1998	Fox	co-production with Keyser/Lippman Productions
Push	1998	ABC	co-production with Starboard Home Industries, Great Guns Films, Perry Pictures and Stu Segall Productions
The Simple Life	1998	CBS	co-production with Sternin and Fraser Ink, CC Lyons Productions and Bell Prime Time
Rude Awakening	1998–2001	Showtime	co-production with Showtime Networks, Mandalay Television and Lions Gate Television (seasons 2–3)
Oh Baby	1998–2000	Lifetime	co-production with Mandalay Television and Lions Gate Television (season 2)
Who Wants to Be a Millionaire?	1998–2014; 2018–present	ITV	produced by Celador (1998–2007), 2waytraffic (2007–12), and Victory Television (2011–14) co-production with Stellify Media (2018–present)
Godzilla: The Series	1998–2000	Fox Kids	co-production with Adelaide Productions, Toho Co., Ltd. and Centropolis Television; Based on the 1998 film by TriStar Pictures
Hollywood Squares	1998–2004	Syndication	co-production with King World Studios West, Moffitt/Lee Productions (1998–2002), One Ho Productions (1998–2002) and Henry Winkler-Michael Levitt Productions (2002–04); Distributed by King World
The King of Queens	1998–2007	CBS	co-production with Hanley Productions, CBS Productions (1998–2006) and CBS Paramount Network Television (2006–2007); Distributed outside of the U.S. by Paramount Global Content Distribution
L.A. Doctors	1998–99	CBS	co-production with Johnson/Hancock Productions and CBS Productions
Fantasy Island	1998–99	ABC	co-production with Sonnenfeld Josephson Worldwide Entertainment; Based on the 1977 TV series by Spelling-Goldberg Productions and Columbia Pictures Television
Cupid	1998–99	ABC	co-production with Mandalay Television
V.I.P.	1998–2002	Syndication	co-production with Lawton Entertainment
Guys Like Us	1998–99	UPN	
Mercy Point	1998–99	UPN	co-production with Mandalay Television
Dilbert	1999–2000	UPN	co-production with Adelaide Productions, Idbox and United Media
Who Wants to Be a Millionaire? Australia	1999–2007; 2010; 2021	Nine Network	produced by Celador (1999–2007) and 2waytraffic (2010) co-production with Grundy Television (1999–2001)
Grown Ups	1999–2000	UPN	co-production with Alan Haymon Productions
Roughnecks: Starship Troopers Chronicles	1999–2000	BKN	co-production with Adelaide Productions and Verhoeven-Marshall; Based on the 1997 film by TriStar Pictures
Wer wird Millionär?	1999–present	RTL	previously produced by Celador (1999–2007) and 2waytraffic (2007–12) co-production with Endemol Shine Germany
Dragon Tales	1999–2005	PBS Kids; CBC	co-production with Adelaide Productions and Sesame Workshop
Action	1999–2000	Fox	co-production with Silver Pictures Television and Christopher Thompson Productions
Big Guy and Rusty the Boy Robot	1999–2001	Fox Kids	co-production with Adelaide Productions and Dark Horse Entertainment
Screen Gems Network	1999–2002	Syndication	distribution only; produced by Evolution Media
Ladies Man	1999–2001	CBS	co-production with Christopher Thompson Productions and CBS Productions
Family Law	1999–2002	CBS	co-production with Paul Haggis Productions and CBS Productions
Shasta McNasty	1999–2000	UPN	co-production with Neal H. Moritz Productions
Los Beltrán	1999–2001	Telemundo	co-production with GaLAn Entertainment, Spanglish Entertainment (season 1) and Si Como No Productions
Time of Your Life	1999–2000	Fox	co-production with Keyser/Lippman Productions
Ripley's Believe It or Not!	2000–03	TBS	co-production with Angry Dragon Entertainment and Termite Art Productions
Max Steel	2000–02	Kids WB/Cartoon Network	co-production with Adelaide Productions and Mainframe Entertainment (season 3)
Secret Agent Man	2000	UPN	co-production with Sonnenfeld Josephson Worldwide Entertainment
Young Americans	2000	The WB	co-production with Mandalay Television and Lionsgate Television
Strong Medicine	2000–06	Lifetime	co-production with One Ho Productions and By the Lake Productions
Sammy	2000	NBC	co-production with Adelaide Productions, Brad Grey Television, Desert Rat Productions, and NBC Studios
Judge Hatchett	2000–08	Syndication	
Jackie Chan Adventures	2000–05	Kids' WB	co-production with Adelaide Productions, The JC Group and Blue Train Entertainment
Grosse Pointe	2000–01	The WB	distribution only; produced by Artists Television Group and Darren Star Productions
Bette	2000–01	CBS	co-production with D-Train Productions, All Girl Productions and CBS Productions
Sheena	2000–02	Syndication	co-production with Douglas Schwartz/Steven L. Sears Productions
Cursed	2000–01	NBC	distribution only; produced by Artists Television Group, NBC Studios and Captain Shadow & Steve
The Street	2000	Fox	co-production with Darren Star Productions and Artists Television Group
D'Myna Leagues	2000–04	CTV Television Network	co-production with Studio B Productions; Currently owned by WildBrain
What About Joan?	2001	ABC	co-production with Gracie Films
The Tick	2001–02	Fox	co-production with Sonnenfeld/Josephson Worldwide Entertainment
Going to California	2001–02	Showtime	co-production with Industry Entertainment and Nitram Pictures
Shipmates	2001–03	Syndication	co-production with Tomlin-Schecter-Young Productions and Hurricane Entertainment Corp.
Alienators: Evolution Continues	2001–02	Fox Kids	international co-production with The Montecito Picture Company, DIC Entertainment and Dentsu produced in the US by DreamWorks Television; Based on the 2001 film by Columbia Pictures and DreamWorks Pictures
Heavy Gear: The Animated Series	2001–02	Syndication	co-production with Adelaide Productions, Dream Pod 9, Paradox Entertainment and Mainframe Entertainment
The Ellen Show	2001–02	CBS	co-production with The Hurwitz Company and CBS Productions
The Guardian	2001–04	CBS	co-production with David Hollander Productions, Gran Via Productions and CBS Productions
Pasadena	2001	Fox	co-production with Brad Grey Television and Go Mike Go Productions
Harold and the Purple Crayon	2001–02	HBO Family	co-production with Adelaide Productions
Imagine That	2002	NBC	co-production with Touchstone Television and Seth Kurland Productions; Distributed outside the U.S. by Disney Platform Distribution
As If	2002	UPN	co-production with Carnival Films
Phantom Investigators	2002	Kids' WB	co-production with Adelaide Productions and (W)holesome Products, Inc.
Russian Roulette	2002–03	Game Show Network	co-production with Gunnar Wetterberg Productions
Street Time	2002–03	Showtime	co-production with Cliffwood Productions and Showtime Networks
Odyssey 5	2002	Showtime	co-production with Manny Coto Productions
The Rerun Show	2002	NBC	co-production with David Salzman Enterprises, John Davies Enterprises, Inc. and NBC Studios
Pyramid	2002–04	Syndication	
Girls Behaving Badly	2002–05	Oxygen	distribution only for broadcast syndication
The Shield	2002–08	FX	co-production with MiddKid Productions and Fox Television Studios
Worst-Case Scenario	2002	TBS	co-production with Pilgrim Films and Television
My Big Fat Greek Life	2003	CBS	co-production with Brad Grey Television, Marsh McCall Productions and Playtone
Stuart Little	2003	HBO Family	co-production with Adelaide Productions and Red Wagon Entertainment; Based on the 1999 film and its sequel by Columbia Pictures
Astro Boy	2003–04	Animax/Fuji TV; Kids' WB/Cartoon Network	co-production with Adelaide Productions, Tezuka Productions, Sony Pictures Entertainment Japan and Dentsu
Spider-Man: The New Animated Series	2003	MTV	co-production with Adelaide Productions, Mainframe Entertainment and Marvel Enterprises
Joan of Arcadia	2003–05	CBS	co-production with Barbara Hall Productions and CBS Productions; Distributed in the U.S. by CBS Media Ventures
Kingdom Hospital	2004	ABC	co-production with Mark Carliner Productions and Touchstone Television
Pat Croce: Moving In	2004–05	Syndication	
Life & Style	2004–05	Syndication	
Rescue Me	2004–11	FX	co-production with The Cloudland Company, Apostle and DreamWorks Television
Huff	2004–06	Showtime	co-production with Bob Lowry Television and 50 Cannon Entertainment
Robot Chicken	2005–present	Adult Swim	continued from Sony Pictures Digital co-production with ShadowMachine (seasons 1–5), Stoopid Monkey, Stoopid Buddy Stoodios (season 6–11), Sony Pictures Digital (seasons 1–5) and Williams Street; SPT produced the series for seasons 6–10 and specials since 2012
Stargate SG-1	2005–06	Sci Fi	co-production with Double Secret Production and MGM Television; Sony co-produced season 9 as part of the company-led consortium's purchase of Metro-Goldwyn-Mayer; Based on the 1994 film Stargate by Metro-Goldwyn-Mayer and Carolco Pictures
Stargate Atlantis	2005–06	Sci Fi	co-production with Acme Shark and MGM Television; Sony co-produced season 2 as part of the company-led consortium's purchase of Metro-Goldwyn-Mayer
Beautiful People	2005–06	ABC Family	co-production with 34 Films and Pirates' Cove Entertainment
The Boondocks	2005–14	Adult Swim	co-production with Adelaide Productions and Rebel Base Productions (seasons 1–3)
The Book of Daniel	2006	NBC	co-production with Flody Co., Bumpy Night and NBC Universal Television Studio; Distributed in the U.S. by NBCUniversal Syndication Studios
Emily's Reasons Why Not	2006	ABC	co-production with Pariah Films
Love Monkey	2006	CBS	co-production with 34 Films, Gran Via Productions and Paramount Network Television; Distributed in the U.S. by CBS Media Ventures
Heist	2006	NBC	co-production with Cullen Bros. Television, Dutch Oven Productions and NBC Universal Television Studio
Runaway	2006	The CW	co-production with Golly and Darren Star Productions
'Til Death	2006–10	Fox	co-production with Goldsmith/Yupsa Productions
Chain Reaction	2006–07; 2015–22	Game Show Network	co-production with Embassy Row (2006–07)
Judge Maria Lopez	2006–08	Syndication	
Dragons' Den Canada	2006–present	CBC	continued from Celador (2006–07) and 2waytraffic (2007–12); Based on the international format Dragons' Den
10 Items or Less	2006–09	TBS	co-production with Howler Monkey Productions
My Boys	2006–10	TBS	co-production with 2 Out Rally Productions and Pariah Television
It's a Big Big World	2006–10	PBS Kids	distribution and licensing rights only; produced by Big Big Productions and Shadow Projects (uncredited)
Kidnapped	2006–07	NBC	co-production with Dark & Stormy Productions, Rooney McP Productions and 25 C Productions
Big Day	2006–07	ABC	co-production with Goldsmith/Yuspa Productions
The Greg Behrendt Show	2006–07	Syndication	
Viva Laughlin	2007	CBS	co-production with CBS Paramount Network Television, BBC Worldwide Productions and Seed Productions; Distributed in the U.S. by CBS Media Ventures
Grand Slam	2007	Game Show Network	co-production with Monkey Kingdom and Embassy Row
Power of 10	2007–08	CBS	co-production with Embassy Row
Judge David Young	2007–09	Syndication	
Rules of Engagement	2007–13	CBS	co-production with Game Six Productions, Happy Madison Productions and CBS Television Studios; Distributed outside of the U.S. by Paramount Global Content Distribution
Damages	2007–12	FX/Audience	co-production with KZK Productions, Gotham Music Placement, FX Productions (seasons 1–3) and DirecTV Original Entertainment (seasons 4–5)
Cashmere Mafia	2008	ABC	co-production with Gail Katz Productions, Kevin Wade Productions and Darren Star Productions
Comanche Moon	2008	CBS	co-production with The Firm, Saria Inc. and CBS Paramount Network Television
The Gong Show with Dave Attell	2008	Comedy Central	co-production with Happy Madison Productions and GOLDer Productions
Judge Karen	2008–09	Syndication	
Breaking Bad	2008–13	AMC	co-production with High Bridge Entertainment and Gran Via Productions
The Spectacular Spider-Man	2008–09	The CW/Disney XD	co-production with Adelaide Productions, Marvel Entertainment and Culver Entertainment
Canterbury's Law	2008	Fox	co-production with Apostle
Doña Bárbara	2008–09	Telemundo	co-production with Telemundo Studios and RTI Producciones
The Beast	2009	A&E	co-production with Rooney McP Productions, Angell & Rotko, Trotwood Productions and Scarlet Fire Entertainment
Cupid	2009	ABC	co-production with Rob Thomas Productions and ABC Studios
The Unusuals	2009	ABC	co-production with Totally Commercial Films and 26 Keys Productions
Sit Down, Shut Up	2009	Fox	co-production with Adelaide Productions, Tantamount Studios, ITV Studios and 20th Century Fox Television; Distributed in the U.S. by Disney Platform Distribution
Millionaire Hot Seat	2009–23	Nine Network	continued from 2waytraffic
HawthoRNe	2009–11	TNT	co-production with 100% Womon Productions (season 1), Overbrook Entertainment (seasons 2–3), FanFare Productions and John Masius Productions (seasons 1–2)
Drop Dead Diva	2009–14	Lifetime	co-production with Osprey Productions and Post Road Productions
Watch What Happens Live with Andy Cohen	2009–present	Bravo	co-production with Embassy Row and Bravo Media Productions
Shark Tank	2009–present	ABC	co-production with Mark Burnett Productions (2009–2014), One Three Media (2011–2014), United Artists Media Group (2014–2016) and MGM Television (2016–present); Based on the international format Dragons' Den
The Dr. Oz Show	2009–22	Syndication	co-production with ZoCo Productions (season 1), Harpo Productions (seasons 1–8), OzWorks (seasons 1–8) and Oz Media (seasons 9–13)
Community	2009–15	NBC/Yahoo! Screen	co-production with Universal Television, Krasnoff/Foster Entertainment, Dan Harmon Productions (2009–2012), Russo Brothers Films (2009–2012), Harmonious Clatrap (2014–2015), and Yahoo! Studios (2015)
Brothers	2009	Fox	co-production with Impact Zone Productions and Tantamount Studios
The Sing-Off	2009–14	NBC	co-production with Tenth Planet Productions, Outlaw Productions, One Three Media (season 4) and United Artists Media Group (season 5)
Los caballeros las prefieren brutas	2010–12	Sony Entertainment Television	co-production with Caracol Televisión and Labernito Productions
Justified	2010–15	FX	co-production with Rooney McP Productions, Timberman/Beverly Productions, Nemo Films and FX Productions
Ben Hur	2010	CBC; ABC	co-production with Muse Entertainment, Drimtim Entertainment, Zak Productions, Akkord Film, FishCorb Films, Antena 3 Films and ProSieben
Plain Jane	2010–14	The CW/MTV	co-production with Fly on the Wall Entertainment
The Big C	2010–13	Showtime	co-production with Perkins Street Productions, Farm Kid Films, Original Film and Showtime Networks
The Nate Berkus Show	2010–12	Syndication	co-production with Nate Berkus Entertainment, Curly One Productions and Harpo Studios
Mr. Sunshine	2011	ABC	co-production with Anhedonia Productions, Barnow and Firek Productions, FanFare Productions and Shoe Money Productions
Mad Love	2011	CBS	co-production with Two Soups Productions, FanFare Productions and CBS Television Studios
Breaking In	2011–12	Fox	co-production with Adam F. Goldberg Productions and Happy Madison Productions
Happy Endings	2011–13	ABC	co-production with FanFare Productions, Shark vs. Bear Productions and ABC Studios
Franklin & Bash	2011–14	TNT	co-production with FanFare Productions, Four Sycamore Productions and Left Coast Productions
Pet Squad	2011	CBBC	co-production with Darrall Macqueen, March Entertainment and Inspidea
Necessary Roughness	2011–13	USA Network	co-production with Still Married Productions and Universal Cable Productions; Distributed in the U.S. by NBCUniversal Syndication Studios
Unforgettable	2011–16	CBS/A&E	co-production with Timberman/Beverly Ptoductions and Television Studios
Charlie's Angels	2011	ABC	co-production with Millar Gough Ink, Panda Productions and Flower Films
Pan Am	2011–12	ABC	co-production with Shoe Money Productions, Jack Orman Productions and Out of the Blue Entertainment
Una Maid en Manhattan	2011–12	Telemundo	co-production with Telemundo Studios; Based on the 2002 film by Columbia Pictures
Remodeled	2012	The CW	co-production with Fly on the Wall Entertainment
The Firm	2012	NBC	co-production with Entertainment One, Shaw Media, Lukas Reiter Productions and Paramount Pictures; Distributed by Lionsgate Television outside of AXN markets
The Pyramid	2012	Game Show Network	co-production with Embassy Row
The Client List	2012–13	Lifetime	co-production with Jaffe-Braunstein Entertainment, ITV Studios America and Fedora Films
Kathy	2012–13	Bravo	co-production with Embassy Row and Donut Run, Inc.
Men at Work	2012–14	TBS	co-production with FanFare Productions and Monkey Shoe Productions
Comedians in Cars Getting Coffee	2012–19	Crackle/Netflix	co-production with Embassy Row and Columbus 81 Productions
The American Bible Challenge	2012–14	Game Show Network	co-production with Relativity Television and Embassy Row
Coma	2012	A&E	co-production with Warner Bros. Television, Turner Entertainment Co. (uncredited) and Scott Free Productions
The Mob Doctor	2012–13	Fox	co-production co-production with Osprey Productions and Rooney McP Productions
Last Resort	2012–13	ABC	co-production with Big Sun Productions and MiddKid Productions
Made in Jersey	2012	CBS	co-production with Left Coast Productions, FanFare Productions and CBS Television Studios
The Job	2013	CBS	co-production with Embassy Row
The Jenny McCarthy Show	2013	VH1	co-production with Embassy Row and Jenny McCarthy Productions
Hannibal	2013–15	NBC	co-production with Dino de Laurentiis Company, Living Dead Guy Productions, and Gaumont International Television
Save Me	2013	NBC	co-production with JSS Entertainment and Original Film
5 viudas sueltas	2013–14	Caracol Televisión	co-production with Caracol Televisión
Summer Camp	2013	USA Network	co-production with Fly on the Wall Entertainment and USA Network Media Productions
Talking Bad	2013	AMC	co-production with Embassy Row and AMC Studios
The Queen Latifah Show	2013–15	Syndication	co-production with Flavor Unit Entertainment, Overbrook Entertainment and Curly One Productions (season 1); Revival of the 1999 TV series
The Blacklist	2013–23	NBC	co-production with Davis Entertainment and Universal Television
The Goldbergs	2013–23	ABC	co-production with Adam F. Goldberg Productions, Happy Madison Productions, Doug Robinson Productions (seasons 5–10), Swinging Cricket Productions (seasons 9–10), Old European Elegance (seasons 9–10) and Script L. Shannon, Inc. (seasons 9–10)
The Michael J. Fox Show	2013–14	NBC	co-production with Olive Bridge Entertainment and Sam Laybourne Inc.
Masters of Sex	2013–16	Showtime	co-production with Round Two Productions, Timberman/Beverly Productions and Showtime Networks
Welcome to the Family	2013	NBC	co-production with Old Charlie Productions
Helix	2014–15	Syfy	co-production with Kaji Productions, Muse Entertainment, Lynda Obst Productions and Tall Ship Productions
Mom's Got Game	2014	Oprah Winfrey Network	co-production with Richard Devinki Productions and Pierre Entertainment
Rake	2014	Fox	co-production with Blow by Blow Productions, Essential Media and Entertainment and Fedora Entertainment
El Mariachi	2014	AXN	co-production with Teleset; Based on the 1992 film by Columbia Pictures
Bad Teacher	2014	CBS	co-production with Gifted and Talented Camp Productions, Mosaic Media Group, Quantity Entertainment and CBS Television Studios; Based on the 2011 film by Columbia Pictures
The Night Shift	2014–17	NBC	co-production with Sachs/Judah Productions
Metástasis	2014	Caracol Televisión	co-production with Teleset; Based on Breaking Bad
Dominion	2014–15	Syfy	co-production with FanFare Productions, Film Afrika, Bold Films and Universal Cable Productions; Based on the 2010 film Legion by Screen Gems
Satisfaction	2014–15	USA Network	co-production with Krasnoff/Foster Entertainment, Rhythm Arts Entertainment and Universal Cable Productions
Outlander	2014–26	Starz	co-production with Left Bank Pictures, Story Mining & Supply Company and Tall Ship Productions
Marry Me	2014–15	NBC/E4	co-production with Shark vs. Bear Productions, FanFare Productions and Exhibit A
The Red Tent	2014	Lifetime	co-production with Kasbah-Film Tanger and Spring Creek Productions
The McCarthys	2014–15	CBS	co-production with Loosely Inspired by Bambi Cottages Productions, Olive Bridge Entertainment and CBS Television Studios
Hindsight	2015	VH1	co-production with The POPFilms Movie Company, Timberman-Beverly Productions and In Cahoots Media
Mad Dogs	2015–16	Amazon Prime Video	co-production with MiddKid Productions, Cris Cole Productions, Left Bank Pictures and Amazon Studios
Street Art Showdown	2015	Oxygen	co-production with Embassy Row, Ugly Pretty Productions and Oxygen Media Productions
Better Call Saul	2015–22	AMC	co-production with High Bridge Entertainment, Crystal Diner Productions, and Gran Via Productions
Battle Creek	2015	CBS	co-production with Shore Z Productions, Gran Via Productions and CBS Television Studios
Powers	2015–16	PlayStation Network	co-production with Circle of Confusion and Jinxworld
Asia's Got Talent	2015–19	AXN	co-production with Fremantle
Miss Dynamite	2015	TNT Latin America	co-production with Teleset and Televisa
Bloodline	2015–17	Netflix	co-production with Sarabande Productions and KZK Productions
The Lizzie Borden Chronicles	2015	Lifetime	co-production with Peace Out Productions
Your Family or Mine	2015	TBS	co-production with The Malins Company, FanFare Productions, Keshet International and Tedy Productions
Beyond the Tank	2015–16	ABC	co-production with United Artists Media Group (2015) and MGM Television (2016)
Lady, la vendedora de rosas	2015	RCN Television	co-production with Teleset
The Jim Gaffigan Show	2015–16	TV Land	co-production with Fedora Entertainment, Brillstein Entertainment Partners, Burrow Owl Productions, Jax Media, Chimichanga Productions, Inc. and TV Land Original Productions
Sneaky Pete	2015–19	Amazon Prime Video	co-production with Shore Z Productions, Nemo Films, Moon Shot Entertainment, Exhibit A, and Amazon Studios
The Player	2015	NBC	co-production with Davis Entertainment, Kung Fu Monkey Productions and Universal Television
Dr. Ken	2015–17	ABC	co-production with Old Charlie Productions, Davis Entertainment, and ABC Studios
SuperMansion	2015–19	Crackle	co-production with Stoopid Monkey, Stoopid Buddy Stoodios and Moon Shot Entertainment
The Art of More	2015–16	Crackle	co-production with Muse Entertainment and Laurence Mark Productions
Cash Cab Philippines	2015	AXN	co-production with All3Media and ActiveTV Asia
The Amazing Race Asia	2016	AXN (Asia)	co-production with Profiles Television and ABC Signature; Distributed by Disney Platform Distribution
La querida del Centauro	2016–17	Telemundo	co-production with Telemundo Studios and Teleset
Outsiders	2016–17	WGN America	co-production with Famous Horses, Fedora Entertainment, Touchy Feely Films and Tribune Studios
Underground	2016–17	WGN America	co-production with Afemme, Get Lifted Film Company, Weed Road Pictures, Safehouse Pictures, Wandering Rocks Productions and Tribune Studios
Game of Silence	2016	NBC	co-production with David Hudgins Productions, Carol Mendelsohn Productions and Universal Television
Strong	2016	NBC	co-production with 25/7 Productions and Lake Paradise Entertainment; Distributed by NBCUniversal Syndication Studios
Preacher	2016–19	AMC	co-production with Woodbridge Productions, Short Drive Entertainment, Point Grey Pictures, Original Film, Kickstart Productions, KFL Nightsky Productions and AMC Studios
The Get Down	2016–17	Netflix	co-production with Bazmark Films
Houdini & Doyle	2016	Fox; Global Television Network; ITV	co-production with Shore Z Productions, Shaw Communications, Big Talk Productions and Shaftesbury Films
The Tick	2016–19	Amazon Prime Video	co-production with Josephson Entertainment and Amazon Studios
Brief Encounters	2016	ITV	Distribution only; produced by Celador
The $100,000 Pyramid	2016–present	ABC	co-production with SMAC Productions
The Gong Show	2017–18	ABC	co-production with Den of Thieves
StartUp	2016–18	Crackle	co-production with Hollywood Gang Productions, Critical Content, Jacobs Media and Story Machine
Go Time	2016–18	Syndication	Advertising sales only; produced and distributed by Litton Entertainment
Kevin Can Wait	2016–18	CBS	co-production with Hey Eddie Productions, Mohawk Productions and CBS Television Studios
Notorious	2016	ABC	co-production with Osprey Productions, Firm Management and ABC Studios
Timeless	2016–18	NBC	co-production with MiddKid Productions, Kripke Enterprises, Davis Entertainment and Universal Television
The Crown	2016–23	Netflix	co-production with Left Bank Pictures
One Day at a Time	2017–20	Netflix/Pop	co-production with Act III Productions, Snowpants Productions, Big Girl Pants Productions (seasons 1–2) and Glo Nation (seasons 3–4)
The Blacklist: Redemption	2017	NBC	co-production with Davis Entertainment, The Jo(h)ns and Universal Television; Spin-off of The Blacklist
Imaginary Mary	2017	ABC	co-production with David Guarascio Productions, Adam F. Goldberg Productions, Happy Madison Productions and ABC Studios
Snatch	2017–18	Crackle	co-production with Little Island Productions
Live PD: Police Patrol	2017–20	A&E	distribution for off-network syndication only; produced by Big Fish Entertainment, MGM Television and A+E Networks
Adventure: Your Way	2017	AXN	co-production with Unitel StraightShooters
Mr. Mercedes	2017–19	Audience	co-production with David E. Kelley Productions, Nomadicfilm, Temple Hill Productions and Sonar Entertainment; Distributed outside of the U.S. by Sony Pictures Television
Atypical	2017–21	Netflix	co-production with Exhibit A and Weird Brain, Inc.
Philip K. Dick's Electric Dreams	2017–18	Channel 4 Amazon Prime Video	co-production with Anonymous Content, Channel 4 Television, Amazon Studios, Electric Shepherd Productions, Moon Shot Entertainment, Left Bank Pictures, Rooney McP Productions and Tall Ship Productions
After Trek	2017–18	CBS All Access	co-production with Embassy Row and Roddenberry Entertainment
Absentia	2017–20	AXN/Amazon Prime Video	co-production with Gemstone Studios, Masha Productions, Media Bart Productions and Bizu Productions
The Good Doctor	2017–24	ABC	co-production with Shore Z Productions, 3AD, EnterMedia and ABC Signature
S.W.A.T.	2017–25	CBS	co-production with MiddKid Productions, Kansas Art Productions, Original Film, Perfect Storm Entertainment and CBS Studios; Based on the 1975 original series by Spelling-Goldberg Productions
Future Man	2017–20	Hulu	co-production with Point Grey Pictures, Matt Tolmach Productions, and Turkey Foot Productions
Alex, Inc.	2018	ABC	co-production with Davis Entertainment, Two Soups Productions, and ABC Studios
The Dangerous Book for Boys	2018	Amazon Prime Video	co-production with Moon Shot Entertainment and Amazon Studios
Cobra Kai	2018–25	YouTube Red/YouTube Premium/Netflix	co-production with Hurwitz & Schlossberg Productions (seasons 1–2), Overbrook Entertainment (seasons 1–2), Heald Productions (season 2), Counterbalance Entertainment (seasons 3–6) and Westbrook Studios (seasons 3–6); Based on the 1984 film The Karate Kid, its sequels and its 2010 remake by Columbia Pictures
The Queen of Flow	2018–26	Caracol Televisión	co-production with Teleset
Kandi Koated Nights	2018	Bravo	co-production with Embassy Row, Kandi Koated Productions, TTucker Productions, and Bravo Media Productions
Us & Them	2018	Crackle	co-production with Men of Science and BBC Worldwide Productions; Originally scheduled to air on Fox
Origin	2018	YouTube Premium	co-production with CiTVC, Midnight Radio and Left Bank Pictures
Champaign ILL	2018	YouTube Premium	co-production with Bro Bro, Jordan Productions, Shark vs. Bear and FanFare Productions
Schooled	2019–20	ABC	co-production with Adam F. Goldberg Productions, Happy Madison Productions, Doug Robinson Productions, Marc Firek Productions and ABC Studios
Deadly Class	2019	Syfy	co-production with Gozie AGBO, Chipmunk Hill, Getaway Productions, Giant Generator, 2 Miles Entertainment and Universal Cable Productions
Black Monday	2019–21	Showtime	co-production with Shark vs. Bear, Jordan Productions, Point Grey Pictures and Showtime Networks
El Barón	2019	Telemundo	co-production with Telemundo Global Studios
L.A.'s Finest	2019–20	Charter Spectrum	co-production with 2.0 Entertainment, Don Simpson/Jerry Bruckheimer Films, The Brandons and Green Eggs and Ham Productions
La reina soy yo	2019	Las Estrellas	co-production with Teleset
Live in Front of a Studio Audience	2019–21	ABC	co-production with Act III Communications, Kimmelot, Smoking Baby Productions, Gary Sanchez Productions and Simpson Street
The Boys	2019–26	Amazon Prime Video	co-production with Kripke Enterprises, Original Film, Point Grey Pictures, Kickstart Entertainment, KFL Nightsky Productions and Amazon MGM Studios
The Mel Robbins Show	2019–20	Syndication	
Pandora	2019–20	The CW	co-production with Radioactive Fishtank, Vital Signs Entertainment and Starlings Television
For All Mankind	2019–present	Apple TV+	co-production with Tall Ship Productions and Delicatessen Media (season 5–present)
Jeopardy! The Greatest of All Time	2020	ABC	syndicated reruns by CBS Television Distribution
Party of Five	2020	Freeform	co-production with Pampola Productions, Mad Bean Productions and Freeform Original Productions
Lincoln Rhyme: Hunt for the Bone Collector	2020	NBC	co-production with Signal Hill Productions, Pernomium, Sin Video (pilot), Keshet Studios and Universal Television; Based on the novel The Bone Collector by Jeffrey Deaver; Distributed in the U.S. by NBCUniversal Syndication Studios
Indebted	2020	NBC	co-production with Screaming Elliot Productions, Doug Robinson Productions and Universal Television
For Life	2020–21	ABC	co-production with Channel Road Productions, G-Unit Films and Television Inc., Doug Robinson Productions and ABC Signature
#FreeRayshawn	2020	Quibi	co-production with Fuqua Films
Murder House Flip	2020–22	Quibi/The Roku Channel	co-production with Osprey Productions and Critical Content (season 2)
White Lines	2020	Netflix	co-production with Left Bank Pictures and Vancouver Media
Alex Rider	2020–24	Amazon Prime Video/Amazon Freevee	co-production with Eleventh Hour Films
Crossing Swords	2020–21	Hulu	co-production with Buddy System Studios, Tom Is Awesome and Stoopid Buddy Stoodios
United We Fall	2020	ABC	co-production with Juban Productions, Julius Sharpe International Petroleum & Writing, Exhibit A and ABC Studios
Truth Seekers	2020	Amazon Prime Video	co-production with Stolen Picture and Amazon Studios
Woke	2020–22	Hulu	co-production with Cloud Nine Productions, Olive Bridge Entertainment and ABC Signature
De brutas, nada	2020–23	Amazon Prime Video	
Coyote	2021	CBS All Access	co-production with Dark Horse Entertainment, The Carnes & Gilbert Business, Narrative Ballistics, MacLaren Entertainment and Paramount Network Original
Celebrity Wheel of Fortune	2021–present	ABC	Spin-off of Wheel of Fortune
Everyone is Doing Great	2021–present	Hulu/Netflix	co-production with Folly Films, RBL Studios, Derango Pictures, Dadada Media (season 2) and XRM Media (season 2)
Call Your Mother	2021	ABC	co-production with Kari's Logo Here and ABC Signature
Men in Kilts: A Roadtrip with Sam and Graham	2021–23	Starz	co-production with Boardwalk Pictures and Great Glen Company
Behind Her Eyes	2021	Netflix	co-production with Left Bank Pictures
Leonardo	2021	Rai 1	co-production with Lux Vide, Big Light Productions, Rai Fiction, France Télévisions, RTVE and Alfresco Pictures
Rebel	2021	ABC	co-production with Trip the Light Productions, Davis Entertainment and ABC Signature
Them	2021–24	Amazon Prime Video	co-production with Hillman Grand Productions, Odd Man Out, Vertigo Entertainment and Amazon Studios
Copy That	2021	YouTube	co-production with Hard North Media
Chapelwaite	2021	Epix	distribution only; produced by De Line Pictures and Epix Studios
Days of Our Lives: Beyond Salem	2021–22	Peacock	co-production with Corday Productions
I Know What You Did Last Summer	2021	Amazon Prime Video	co-production with Off Center Inc., Original Film, Mandalay Television, Atomic Monster and Amazon Studios; Based on the 1998 film by Columbia Pictures
Blade Runner: Black Lotus	2021–22	Adult Swim (Toonami)	co-production with Crunchyroll, Sola Digital Arts, Alcon Entertainment and Williams Street
The Wheel of Time	2021–25	Amazon Prime Video	co-production with Radar Pictures, Iwot Pictures, Long Weekend, Little Island Productions and Amazon MGM Studios
The Good Dish	2022	Syndication	co-production with Emerald City Media
The Afterparty	2022–23	Apple TV+	co-production with Lord Miller Productions and TriStar Television
Jeopardy! National College Championship	2022	ABC	
The Boys Presents: Diabolical	2022	Amazon Prime Video	co-production with Titmouse, Inc., Kripke Enterprises, Original Film, Point Grey Pictures and Amazon Studios; Spin-off of The Boys
Slow Horses	2022–present	Apple TV+	co-production with See-Saw Films and Flying Studio Pictures; SPT produced season 1 only
Hullraisers	2022–23	Channel 4	co-production with Fable Pictures, Dori Media International and Yoav Gross Productions
The Long Game: Bigger Than Basketball	2022	Apple TV+	co-production with Exhibit A and Boardwalk Pictures
Gordita Chronicles	2022	HBO Max	co-production with Cinestar, Osprey Productions, UnbeliEVAble Entertainment and Bons Mots Emporium Inc.
A League of Their Own	2022	Amazon Prime Video	co-production with Tender Pictures, Field Trip and Amazon Studios
Fastest Finger First	2022	ITV	co-production with Stellify Media; Spin-off of Who Wants to Be a Millionaire?
Celeb Cooking School	2022–24	E4	continued from Electric Ray (season 1) co-production with Motion Content Group and RDF Television (season 2)
Celebrity Jeopardy!	2022–present	ABC	
Panhandle	2022	The Roku Channel; Charter Spectrum	co-production with Stoller Global Solutions and Danger Doll Productions
Three Pines	2022	Amazon Prime Video	co-production with Left Bank Pictures and Amazon Studios
A Spy Among Friends	2022	ITVX; MGM+	co-production with FLW, Ginger Biscuit Entertainment and ITV Studios
Alert: Missing Persons Unit	2023–25	Fox	co-production with Whale Productions, Foxxhole Productions, Danger Doll Productions and Fox Entertainment
The Last of Us	2023–present	HBO	co-production with The Mighty Mint, Word Games, PlayStation Productions and Naughty Dog
Accused	2023–24	Fox	co-production with All3Media International, Teakwood Lane Productions and Fox Entertainment
Jeopardy! Masters	2023–present	ABC	Spin-off of Jeopardy!
The Night Agent	2023–present	Netflix	co-production with MiddKid Productions, Exhibit A, and Project X Entertainment
Platonic	2023–present	Apple TV+	co-production with Stoller Global Solutions and Point Grey Pictures
Psi Cops	2023	Adult Swim (Canada)	co-production with Corus Entertainment, Oddfellows Labs, Skybound Galactic and Wind Sun Sky Entertainment
Justified: City Primeval	2023	FX	miniseries; co-production with Rooney McP Productions, Timberman-Beverly Productions, Dave & Ron Productions, Olybomb Productions, MGM Television and FXP; Sequel to Justified
Twisted Metal	2023–present	Peacock	co-production with Reese Wernick Productions, Make It with Gravy, Electric Avenue, Artists First, Wicked Deed, Inspire Entertainment, PlayStation Productions and Universal Television
The Winter King	2023	ITVX; MGM+	co-production Bad Wolf and One Big Picture
Gen V	2023–25	Amazon Prime Video	co-production with Fazekas Penny Arcade, Kripke Enterprises, Original Film, Point Grey Pictures, Kickstart Entertainment, KFL Nightsky Productions and Amazon MGM Studios; Spin-off of The Boys
Goosebumps	2023–25	Disney+ Hulu	co-production with Original Film, Stoller Global Solutions, Gifted And Talented Camp (season 2) and Scholastic Entertainment
Raid the Cage	2023–present	CBS	co-production with Two Shakes Entertainment and United Studios Israel
The Artful Dodger	2023–present	Disney+	co-production with Beach Road Pictures and Curio Pictures
Obliterated	2023	Netflix	co-production with Counterbalance Entertainment
Good Times: Black Again	2024	Netflix	co-production with Coco Cubana Productions, Fuzzy Door Productions, Unanimous Media and Act III Productions; Based on the 1974 TV series by Tandem Productions
Dark Matter	2024–present	Apple TV+	co-production with Matt Tolmach Productions and Mountainside Entertainment
El Conde: Amor y honor	2024	Telemundo	co-production with Telemundo Global Studios
Sausage Party: Foodtopia	2024–25	Amazon Prime Video	co-production with Point Grey Pictures, Annapurna Television and Amazon MGM Studios; Based on the 2016 film by Columbia Pictures and Annapurna Pictures
Universal Basic Guys	2024–present	Fox	co-production with Mutsack, One Man Canoe (season 1), Mediazhka (season 2), Bento Box Entertainment and Fox Entertainment Animation
The Pradeeps of Pittsburgh	2024	Amazon Prime Video/Amazon Freevee	co-production with Not It, Sara+Tom, Semi-Formal Productions and Amazon Studios
Cruel Intentions	2024	Amazon Prime Video	co-production with Off Center, Inc., Original Film. AMBI Media Group and Amazon MGM Studios; Based on the 1999 film by Columbia Pictures
Doc	2025–present	Fox	co-production with Avenue K Productions, Channel Road Productions and Fox Entertainment
Clean Slate	2025	Amazon Prime Video	co-production with Act III Productions, Laverne Cox Productions and Amazon MGM Studios
Long Bright River	2025	Peacock	co-production with Original Film, Pascal Pictures, Black Mass Productions and Universal Content Productions
Yo no soy Mendoza	2025	Netflix	
Outlander: Blood of My Blood	2025–present	Starz	co-production with Left Bank Pictures, Story Mining & Supply Co., Tall Ship Productions and No Fooling Productions; Spin-off of Outlander
Boots	2025	Netflix	co-production with Act III Productions, A House on Brame, Minty Goodness and Blue Encounter
Pluribus	2025–present	Apple TV	co-production with High Bridge Productions and Bristol Circle Entertainment
The Miniature Wife	2026–present	Peacock	International distribution only; produced by Sad Ice Cream Inc. and Media Res
Spider-Noir	2026	MGM+ Amazon Prime Video	co-production with Pascal Pictures, Lord Miller Productions, Bohemian Risk Productions, Oren, Marvel Entertainment and Amazon MGM Studios
Star City	2026–present	Apple TV	co-production with Tall Ship Productions and Delicatessen Media; Spin-off of For All Mankind
ESPN Jeopardy!	2026–present	Disney+ Hulu; ESPN	Spin-off of Jeopardy!
Golden Axe	2026–present	Paramount+	co-production with Chandyland, Important Science, Original Film, Sega, Titmouse, Inc. and CBS Eye Animation Productions
American Hostage	2026–present	MGM+	co-production with MiddKid Productions, Furious Agreement Productions and Criminal Content
S.W.A.T. Exiles	2026–present	Starz	co-production with Original Film and Ning
Blade Runner 2099	Coming 2026	Amazon Prime Video	co-production with Amazon MGM Studios, Alcon Television Group and Scott Free Productions; Based on the 1982 film and its sequel by Warner Bros. Pictures and Columbia Pictures (sequel only)
Vought Rising	Coming 2027	Amazon Prime Video	co-production with Amazon MGM Studios, Original Film, Point Grey Pictures and Kripke Enterprises; Spin-off of The Boys
And Justice for All	TBA	Netflix	co-production with Fineman Entertainment; Based on the 1979 film by Columbia Pictures
The Bad Kids	TBA	TBA	co-production with Original Film and IQIYI
Bewitched	TBA	Fox	co-production with Fox Entertainment and Doug Robinson Productions; Based on the 1964 TV series
The Book of Two Ways	TBA	Netflix	
Clue	TBA	Peacock	co-production with Hasbro Entertainment, Foxy, Inc. and Stoller Global Solutions
Crouching Tiger, Hidden Dragon	TBA	Amazon Prime Video	co-production with Amazon MGM Studios, Tall Ship Productions and Vertigo Entertainment
The Getaway	TBA	TBA	co-production with This Radicle Act and Third Rail Productions
Ghostman	TBA	TBA	co-production with House Eleven10
The God in the Woods	TBA	Netflix	co-production with Happy Friday Productions and Original Film
God of War	TBA	Amazon Prime Video	co-production with Amazon MGM Studios, PlayStation Productions, Santa Monica Studio, Vertigo Entertainment and Tall Ship Productions
I'm Not Here to Hurt You	TBA	Crave	co-production with Bell Media, Blink49 Studios, Alfresco Pictures and Shore Z Productions
Joe Dirt	TBA	Fox	co-production with Fox Entertainment and Doug Robinson Productions; Based on the 2001 film by Columbia Pictures
Music Theories	TBA	Hulu	co-production with Polygram Entertainment
New Haven	TBA	TBA	co-production with Eleventh Hour Films and Hill 5.14
Perversion of Justice: The Jeffrey Epstein Story	TBA	TBA	miniseries; co-production with Hyperobject Industries
Save the Date	TBA	TBA	co-production with Keshet Studios
Swap Meet	TBA	Hulu	co-production with 20th Television Animation and Mortal Media
Untitled The Cable Guy series	TBA	Hulu	co-production with Original Film; Based on the 1996 film by Columbia Pictures
Untitled Dakota Fanning series	TBA	Apple TV	co-production with FLW Productions, Bad Wolf America and Lewellen Pictures
Untitled Miranda Lambert series	TBA	Hulu	co-production with Shopkeeper Management
Up to No Good	TBA	Channel 4	co-production with Playground

=== TriStar Television ===
Formerly known as Tri-Star Television (1986–1987).

=== Gemstone Studios ===
Title	Years	Network	Notes
Absentia	2017–20	AXN/Amazon Prime Video	co-production with Media Brat Productions, Bizu Productions, and Sony Pictures Television Studios; The studio produced season 3
Carter	2018–19	CTV Drama Channel	co-production with Bell Media, Amaze Film and Entertainment and Son of a Dentist Productions; The studio produced season 2
Fantasy Island	2021–23	Fox	co-production with Fox Entertainment and Happier in Hollywood

=== Culver Entertainment ===
Title	Years	Network	Notes
The Spectacular Spider-Man	2008–09	The CW/Disney XD	co-production with Marvel Entertainment, Adelaide Productions and Sony Pictures Television
Nick Swardson's Pretend Time	2010–11	Comedy Central	co-production with Happy Madison Productions

=== Embassy Row ===
Formerly known as Diplomatic Productions (2000–05).

Title	Years	Network	Notes
2 Minute Drill	2000–01	ESPN	
Smush	2001	USA Network	co-production with Greengrass Productions and Jellyvision
Pepsi's Play for a Billion	2003–04	The WB/ABC	two specials; co-production with PepsiCo
Studio 7	2004	The WB	co-production with Monkey Entertainment
My Kind of Town	2005	ABC	co-production with Monkey Kingdom and Greengrass Productions
The 9 on Yahoo!	2006–08	Yahoo!	
Chain Reaction	2006–07	GSN	co-production with Sony Pictures Television
The World Series of Pop Culture	2006–07	VH1	Rights held by Skydance
Grand Slam	2007	GSN	co-production with Monkey Kingdom, Sony Pictures Television and GSN
Power of 10	2007–08	CBS	co-production for Sony Pictures Television
The Newlywed Game	2009–13	GSN	co-production with Sony Pictures Television and GSN
Shark After Dark	2009–19	Discovery	
Make My Day	2009	TV Land	co-production with Monkey Kingdom and Sony Pictures Television
Watch What Happens Live with Andy Cohen	2009–present	Bravo	co-production with Sony Pictures Television and Bravo Media Productions
Hidden Agenda	2010	GSN	co-production with Keshet Broadcasting, Kuperman Productions and Sony Pictures Television
The Glee Project	2011–12	Oxygen	co-production with Ryan Murphy Productions and Oxygen Media Productions
Talking Dead	2011–22	AMC	co-production for AMC Studios
The Substitute	2011	MTV	co-production with Phear Creative
Comedians in Cars Getting Coffee	2012–19	Crackle/Netflix	co-production with Sony Pictures Television and Columbus 81 Productions
Kathy	2012–13	Bravo	co-production with Sony Pictures Television and Donut Run (owner)
The American Bible Challenge	2012–14	GSN	co-production with Sony Pictures Television and Relativity Media
The Pyramid	2012	GSN	co-production with Sony Pictures Television
Fashion Queens	2013–15	Bravo	co-production with True Entertainment
The Job	2013	CBS	co-production with Sony Pictures Television
Crowd Rules	2013	CNBC	
Cutthroat Kitchen	2013–17	Food Network	
Talking Bad	2013	AMC	co-production with AMC Studios and Sony Pictures Television
Street Art Throwdown	2015	Oxygen	co-production with Sony Pictures Television and Ugly Pretty Productions
The Grace Helbig Show	2015	E!	
Bianca	2015	Syndication	co-produced with Lucky Gal Productions
Garbage Time with Katie Nolan	2015–17	FS1	
Recipe for Deception	2016	Bravo	co-production with Realizer Productions
VH1 Live!	2016	VH1	Rights held by Skydance
Good Morning Football	2016–present	NFL Network	
Unlocking the Truth	2016	MTV	
Comedy Knockout	2016–18	TruTV	co-production with 3 Arts Entertainment
My Brother, My Brother and Me	2017	Seeso	co-production with Big Giant Head; Rights held by NBCUniversal
Adam Carolla and Friends Build Stuff Live	2017	Spike	Rights held by Skydance
Talking with Chris Hardwick	2017	AMC	co-production with Fish Ladder for AMC Studios
After Trek	2017–18	CBS All Access	co-production with Roddenberry Entertainment
Beyond Stranger Things	2017	Netflix	co-production with Netflix Studios
Bravo's Play by Play	2018	Bravo	co-production with Most Talkative Productions
Unapologetic with Aisha Tyler	2018	AMC	
Below the Belt	2018	Showtime	
The Kyle Brandt Football Experience	2018	NFL Network	
Kandi Koated Nights	2018	Bravo	co-production with Sony Pictures Television, Kandi Koated Entertainment and TTucker Productions
The Fix	2018	Netflix	co-production with Netflix Studios
Who Wants to Be a Millionaire	2020–21; 2024–present	ABC	co-production with Valleycrest Productions (owner) and Kimmelot
Prime Rewind: Inside The Boys	2020	Amazon Prime Video	co-production with Sony Pictures Television Studios
Kal Penn Approves This Message	2020	Freeform	
Doing the Most with Phoebe Robinson	2021	Comedy Central	co-production with Tiny Reparations and Comedy Partners
Tug of Words	2021–23	Game Show Network	co-production with Game Show Enterprises
Fat Joe Talks	2024	Starz	co-production with SpringHill Company and Starz Entertainment
Reading Rainbow	2025–present	YouTube	Season 22–present co-production with WNED Buffalo-Toronto

=== TOY Productions ===
Title	Years	Network	Notes
Grady	1975–76	NBC	Spin-off of the 1972 TV series Sanford and Son by Tandem Productions
What's Happening!!	1976–79	ABC	Inspired by the 1975 film Cooley High by American International Pictures
Carter Country	1977–79	ABC	
13 Queens Boulevard	1979	ABC	
One in a Million	1980	ABC	co-production with Columbia Pictures Television
One of the Boys	1982	NBC	co-production with Columbia Pictures Television

=== Spelling-Goldberg Productions ===
Title	Years	Network	Notes
The Rookies	1972–76	ABC	Originally syndicated by Viacom Enterprises
Chopper One	1974	ABC	
S.W.A.T.	1975–76	ABC	
Starsky & Hutch	1975–79	ABC	
Family	1976–80	ABC	co-production with Icarus Productions
Charlie's Angels	1976–81	ABC	
Fantasy Island	1977–84	ABC	co-production with Columbia Pictures Television
Hart to Hart	1979–84	ABC	co-production with Columbia Pictures Television (seasons 4–5) and Rona II Productions
T. J. Hooker	1982–86	ABC/CBS	co-production with Columbia Pictures Television

=== Rastar Television ===
Title	Years	Network	Notes
Ripley's Believe It or Not!	1982–86	ABC	co-production with Columbia Pictures Television
Blue Thunder	1984	ABC	co-production with Public Arts and Columbia Pictures Television
Nothing in Common	1987	NBC	co-production with TriStar Television
The Hollywood Game	1992	CBS	co-production with CBS Entertainment Productions (owner) and Pasetta Productions

=== ELP Communications ===
Formerly known as T.A.T. Communications Company (1974–1982), Embassy Television (1982–1986) and Embassy Communications (1986–1988). Production of ELP Communications programs were assumed by Columbia Pictures Television in 1988.

Title	Years	Network	Notes
The Jeffersons	1975–85	CBS	co-production with NRW Productions (1975–1979) and Ragamuffin Productions (1980–1981); Spin-off of the 1971 TV series All in the Family by Tandem Productions
Hot l Baltimore	1975	ABC	
One Day at a Time	1975–1984	CBS	co-production with Allwhit, Inc.
Mary Hartman, Mary Hartman	1976–77	Syndication	co-production with Filmways; Distributed by Filmways during season 1 and T.A.T. Communications Company during season 2
The Nancy Walker Show	1976	ABC	
The Dumplings	1976	NBC	
All's Fair	1976–77	CBS	
All That Glitters	1977	Syndication	
Fernwood 2 Night	1977	Syndication	Spin-off of Mary Hartman, Mary Hartman
A Year at the Top	1977	CBS	co-production with Don Kirshner Productions
Forever Fernwood	1977–78	Syndication	Sequel to Mary Hartman, Mary Hartman
America 2-Night	1978	Syndication	Sequel to Fernwood 2 Night
In the Beginning	1978	CBS	
Hello, Larry	1979–80	NBC	
Highcliffe Manor	1979	NBC	
Hanging In	1979	CBS	
The Baxters	1979–81	Syndication	Season 1 co-production with BBI Communications
The Facts of Life	1979–88	NBC	Spin-off of the 1978 TV series Diff'rent Strokes by Tandem Productions
Joe's World	1979–80	NBC	
Palmerstown, U.S.A.	1980–81	CBS	co-production with Haley Productions
Checking In	1981	CBS	co-production with Ragamuffin Productions; Spin-off of The Jeffersons
Kids' Writes	1981–83	Nickelodeon	co-production with Warner-Amex Satellite Entertainment
Silver Spoons	1982–87	NBC/Syndication	co-production with Lightkeeper Productions (1982–84)
Square Pegs	1982–83	CBS	
Double Trouble	1984–85	NBC	
a.k.a. Pablo	1984	ABC	
E/R	1984–85	CBS	
Who's the Boss?	1984–92	ABC	co-production with Hunter-Cohan Productions (1987–92)
It's Your Move	1984–85	NBC	
227	1985–90	NBC	
The Charmings	1987–88	ABC	co-production with Sternin & Fraser Ink
Married... with Children	1987–97	Fox	
Sweet Surrender	1987	NBC	co-production with Dahn Than Productions
Everything's Relative	1987	CBS	co-production with Fredde Productions
Women in Prison	1987–88	Fox	
Trial and Error	1988	CBS	
One of the Boys	1989	NBC	co-production with Stiefel Phillips Entertainment, The Fred Silverman Company and Hunter-Cohan Productions
Live-In	1989	CBS	co-production with Sternin & Fraser Ink, Inc.
The Famous Teddy Z	1989–90	CBS	co-production with Hugh Wilson Productions
Free Spirit	1989–90	ABC	
Living Dolls	1989	ABC	Spin-off of Who's the Boss?
Sugar and Spice	1990	CBS	
Married People	1990–91	ABC	co-production with Sternin & Fraser Ink, Inc.
Top of the Heap	1991	Fox	Spin-off of Married... with Children
Teech	1991	CBS	co-production with Nikndaph Productions
Vinnie & Bobby	1992	Fox	Spin-off of Top of the Heap
Rachel Gunn, R.N.	1992	Fox	co-production with Foul Tempered Woman Productions
The Powers That Be	1992–93	NBC	co-production with Act III Television and Castle Rock Entertainment
Beakman's World	1992–97	TLC/CBS	produced by Columbia TriStar Television from 1994–1997 co-production with Universal Belo Productions
Phenom	1993–94	ABC	co-production with Gracie Films
George	1993–94	ABC	co-production with Katie Face Productions and Envy Productions
704 Hauser	1994	CBS	co-production with Act III Television; Spin-off of the 1971 TV series All in the Family by Tandem Productions
Muddling Through	1994	CBS	co-production with Savage Cake Productions
My Wildest Dreams	1995	Fox	
First Time Out	1995	The WB	

==== Tandem Productions ====
Title	Years	Network	Notes
All in the Family	1971–79	CBS	Based on the 1965 TV series Till Death Us Do Part created by Johnny Speight; Syndicated by Viacom Enterprises until 1990
Sanford and Son	1972–77	NBC	Based on the 1962 TV series Steptoe and Son created by Ray Galton & Alan Simpson by the British Broadcasting Corporation
Maude	1972–78	CBS	Spin-off of All in the Family
Good Times	1974–79	CBS	Spin-off of Maude
Sanford Arms	1977	NBC	Spin-off of Sanford and Son
Diff'rent Strokes	1978–86	NBC/ABC	produced by Embassy Television in season 8
Archie Bunker's Place	1979–83	CBS	Sequel to All in the Family; Based on the 1965 TV series Till Death Us Do Part created by Johnny Speight
Sanford	1980–81	NBC	Sequel to Sanford and Son; Based on Steptoe and Son created by Ray Galton & Alan Simpson
Gloria	1982–83	CBS	Spin-off of Archie Bunker's Place

=== Merv Griffin Enterprises ===
Formerly known as Milbarn Productions (1963–64) and Merv Griffin Productions (1964–84).

Title	Years	Network	Notes
The Merv Griffin Show	1962–86	NBC/CBS/Syndication	distributed by Group W Productions (1964–1969), Metromedia Producers Corporation (1972–1983) and King World (1983–1986) (Note: Currently owned by Merv Griffin Entertainment.)
Let's Play Post Office	1965–66	NBC	
Reach for the Stars	1967	NBC	
One in a Million	1967	NBC	
Memory Game	1971	NBC	
Dance Fever	1979–87	Syndication	co-production with and distributed by 20th Century Fox Television
Headline Chasers	1985–86	Syndication	co-production with Wink Martindale Enterprises; Distributed by King World
Monopoly	1990	ABC	co-production with Parker Brothers and King World (Note: Currently owned by Hasbro Entertainment.)
Super Jeopardy!	1990	ABC	co-production with King World
Ruckus	1991	WNBC	co-production with Columbia Pictures Television

=== Danny Arnold Productions ===
- Barney Miller (1975–82, produced by Four D Productions)
- Fish (1977–78, produced by the Mimus Corporation)
- A.E.S. Hudson Street (1978, produced by Four D Productions)
- Joe Bash (1986, produced by Tetragram Ltd.)

=== The Guber-Peters Entertainment Company ===
Formerly known as Chuck Barris Productions (1965–1982; 1984–1987) and Barris Productions (1987–1989).

Title	Years	Network	Notes
Dream Girl of '67	1966–67		
The Family Game	1967	ABC	
How's Your Mother-in-Law?	1967–68	ABC	
The Game Game	1969	Syndication	
The Parent Game	1972–73	Syndication	
Treasure Hunt	1973–77; 1981–82	Syndication	
The Bobby Vinton Show	1975–78	CTV Television Network/Syndication	
The Gong Show	1976–80; 1988–89	NBC; Syndication	co-production with Chris Bearde Productions (1976–1978)
The $1.98 Beauty Show	1978–80	Syndication	
3's a Crowd	1979–80	Syndication	
Camouflage	1980	Syndication	
Oceanquest	1985	ABC	
Dream Girl USA	1986–87		
Quiz Kids Challenge	1990	Syndication	co-production with Chillmark Productions

=== Franklin/Waterman Worldwide ===
Title	Years	Network	Notes
Stunt Dawgs	1992–93	Syndication	as Franklin/Waterman 2 co-production with Rainforest Entertainment
African Skies	1992–94	The Family Channel	co-production with Atlantis Films
Catwalk	1992–94	YTV	
Mutant League	1994–96	Syndication	as Franklin-Waterman 2 co-production with Electronic Arts
High Tide	1994–97	Syndication	as Franklin-Waterman 2

=== Jack Barry Productions/Barry & Enright Productions ===
- The Honeymoon Game (1970 unsold pilot) (co-production with Metromedia)
- Juvenile Jury (1970–71)
- The Reel Game (1971) (co-production with Four Star Television and ABC)
- Make the Scene (1972; unsold pilot)
- Hollywood's Talking (1973)
- Countdown (1974; unsold pilot)
- Blank Check (1975)
- People Are Funny (1975 unsold pilot) (co-production with Jim Victory Television)
- Hollywood Connection (1977–78; co-production with KTLA)
- We've Got Your Number (1975; unsold pilot)
- Double Cross (1975; game show unsold pilot)
- Break the Bank (1976–77) (served as both network and syndication)
- Way Out Games (1976–77) (co-production with MGM Television; currently owned by Warner Bros. Television)
- Tic-Tac-Dough (1978–86 and 1990 only)
- People Watchers (1970s unsold pilot) (co-production with WISH-TV)
- Decisions, Decisions (1979? unsold pilot)
- Joker, Joker, Joker (1979–81) (children's edition of The Joker's Wild)
- Play the Percentages (1980)
- The Bert Convy Show (1980)
- Bullseye (1980–82)
- Hot Potato (1984)
- All About Us (1985) (daily magazine show hosted by Ron Hendren; part of the INDAY package distributed by LBS Communications)
- Bumper Stumpers (1987–90) (co-production with Global Television Network, Wink Martindale Enterprises, and the USA Network)
- Chain Letters (1987–90) (co-production with ITV Tyne Tees and Action Time)
- Juvenile Jury (1983–84 and 1989–91)
- All About the Opposite Sex (1990)
- Hold Everything! (1990)

=== Stewart Television ===
Formerly known as Bob Stewart Productions (1964–90).

- Eye Guess (1966–69)
- The Face Is Familiar (1966)
- Personality (1967–69)
- You're Putting Me On (1969)
- Three on a Match (1971–74)
- Pyramid

The $10,000 Pyramid (1973–76)
The $20,000 Pyramid (1976–80)
The $25,000 Pyramid (1974–79)
The $50,000 Pyramid (1981)
The (New) $25,000 Pyramid (1982–88)
The $100,000 Pyramid (1985–88) (originally distributed by 20th Century Fox Television)
The $100,000 Pyramid (1991)

- Jackpot! (1974–75, 1985–88, 1989–90)
- Winning Streak (1974–75)
- Blankety Blanks (1975)
- Shoot for the Stars (1977)
- Pass the Buck (1978)
- The Love Experts (1978–79)
- Chain Reaction (1980, 1986–91)
- Go (1983–84)
- Double Talk (1986; revival of Shoot for the Stars)

== Sony Pictures Television – Nonfiction ==
Formerly known as CKX, Inc. (2005–12), CORE Media Group, Inc. (2012–18), and Industrial Media, LLC (2018–22).

Title	Years	Network	Notes
Breuckelen	2014		co-production with Artists Alliance
Prison Wives Club	2014	Lifetime	
Euros of Hollywood	2014	Bravo	co-production with Bayonne Entertainment
Sing It Off	2015–16	Pop	co-production with Sharp Entertainment (season 2) and Get Lifted Film Co.
Preach	2015	Lifetime	
The Wall	2016–present	NBC	co-production with SpringHill Entertainment and Glassman Media
Caraoke Showdown	2017	Spike	co-production with Alevy Productions
Vet Gone Wild	2018	Animal Planet	
Quiet on Set: The Dark Side of Kids TV	2024	Investigation Discovery	co-production with Maxine Productions and Business Insider
The Fall of Diddy	2025	Investigation Discovery	co-production with Maxine Productions and Rolling Stone Films

=== B17 Entertainment ===
Title	Years	Network	Notes
Fluffy's Food Adventures	2015–17	Fuse	co-production with Jaam Productions
Broke A$$ Game Show	2015–16	MTV	co-production with MTV Production Development
Fright Club	2017–18	Travel Channel	
Make Up or Break Up	2017–18	Facebook Watch	
Nail the Look	2017–18	GAWBY	
Help Us Get Married	2018	Facebook Watch	
Do It Duo	2018–19	YouTube	co-production with Disney Branded Television
Confetti	2018–19	Facebook Watch	co-production with Thumb Candy
Fashion 5 Ways	2018	Snapchat	
Ruby's Gems	2019	Instagram	co-production with Disney Branded Television
Ruth & Ruby Ultimate Sleepover	2019	YouTube	co-production with Disney Branded Television
Chasing the Cure	2019	TNT; TBS	
Last Night's Late Night	2020		
Post Malone's Celebrity World Pong League	2020		
The Daily Chill	2020		
Celebrity Substitute	2020		
Craftopia	2020–21	HBO Max	
Thanks a Million	2020–21	Quibi/The Roku Channel	co-production with Universal Television Alternative Studio and Nuyorican Productions
The Great Wire	2020	Syfy	
Here for It with Avani Gregg	2020–21	Facebook Watch	
The Great Gift Exchange	2020	YouTube Premium	co-production with Black Canvas Productions
History of Swear Words	2021	Netflix	co-production with Funny or Die; Rights held by Netflix
Pindrop	2021	YouTube Originals	co-production with The Cabo Agency
Baketopia	2021	HBO Max	
Inside Eats With Rhett & Link	2022	Food Network	co-production with Mythical Entertainment
Non Fungible Planet	2022	YouTube Premium	
Surprise! We're Pregnant	2022	The Roku Channel	
Hungry for Answers	2022	Discovery+	co-production with JuVee Productions
JoJo Goes	2022	Facebook Watch	
The Final Straw	2022	ABC	co-production with Walt Disney Television Alternative and Ohama Productions
The Big Tiny-Food Face Off	2022	Tasty	
From YouTube to You	2022	YouTube	
Amityville: An Origin Story	2023	MGM+	co-production with Invented by Girls and MGM+ Studios
Blue Ribbon Baking Championship	2024	Netflix	
Extracted	2025–present	Fox	co-production with Balboa Productions and Fox Alternative Entertainment
On Brand with Jimmy Fallon	2025–present	NBC	co-production with Electric Hot Dog and Universal Television Alternative Studio
Gabby's Dollhouse: Makers and Bakers	Coming 2026	Netflix	co-production with DreamWorks Animation Television
Clue	TBA	Netflix	co-production with The Intellectual Property Corporation and Hasbro Entertainment
The Making of a Haunting: The Amityville Murders	TBA	TBA	

=== This Machine Filmworks ===
Title	Year	Network	Notes
Dear...	2020–23	Apple TV+	as Cutler Productions; co-production with Matador Content
Supreme Models	2022	YouTube Originals	
Murf the Surf	2023	MGM+	co-production with Imagine Documentaries
Big Vape: The Rise and Fall of Juul	2023	Netflix	co-production with Amblin Television
Fight for Glory: 2024 World Series	2024	Apple TV+	co-production with Imagine Documentaries, MLB Studios, and Cap2 Productions
Esports World Cup: Level Up	2025–present	Amazon Prime Video	co-production with Esports World Cup Foundation and Sony Pictures Television
New Wave	Coming 2026	MGM+	co-production with Polygram Entertainment and 4th Row Films

=== Maxine Productions ===
Title	Year	Network	Notes
Quiet on Set: The Dark Side of Kids TV	2024	Investigation Discovery	co-production with Sony Pictures Television Nonfiction and Business Insider
Girls Gone Wild: The Untold Story	2024	Peacock	co-production with BuzzFeed Studios
Glitter and Greed: The Lisa Frank Story	2024	Amazon Prime Video	co-production with Amazon MGM Studios
The Fall of Diddy	2025	Investigation Discovery	co-production with Sony Pictures Television Nonfiction and Rolling Stone Films
The Real Wolf of Wall Street	2026	Paramount+	co-production with Bloomberg and See It Now Studios
The One About Matthew Perry	2026	Netflix	
The Wolves of Real Estate: The Alexander Brothers	2026	Peacock	co-production with Vox Media Studios and Secret Menu
Untitled Kristil Krug series	TBA	TBA	

=== Trilogy Films ===
Title	Year	Network	Notes
Bobby Kennedy for President	2018	Netflix	co-production with RadicalMedia and LOOKSfilm
37 Words	2022	ESPN	
Deadlocked: How America Shaped the Supreme Court	2023	Showtime	co-production with Showtime Documentary Films
The Sing Sing Chronicles	2024	MSNBC	co-production with NBC News Studios and MSNBC Films

=== 32 Flavors ===
Title	Year	Network	Notes
The Real Housewives of Orange County	2006–present	Bravo	Season 18–present co-production with Kaufman Films (season 1), Evolution Media (season 2–present) and Dunlop Entertainment
The Real Housewives of Beverly Hills	2010–present	Bravo	Season 13–present co-production with Evolution Media
Vanderpump Rules	2013–present	Bravo	Season 11–present co-production with Evolution Media
Denise Richards & Her Wild Things	2025	Bravo	co-production with Smoke & Mirrors Entertainment
Honestly Cavallari: The Headline Tour	2025	E!	
The Valley: Persian Style	2026–present	Bravo	

== Sony Pictures Television – International Production ==
Title	Years	Network	Notes
My Life with the Walter Boys	2023–present	Netflix	co-production with iGeneration Studios and Komixx Entertainment

=== Sony Pictures Television International ===
Formerly known as Columbia Pictures Television International (1974–83), Columbia Pictures International Television (1983–92) Columbia TriStar International Television (1992–2002), and Sony Pictures Television International (2002–09).

Title	Years	Network	Notes
The Upper Hand	1990–96	ITV	co-production with ITV Central/Carlton Television
Chain Letters	1995–97	ITV	co-production with ITV Tyne Tees and Action Time
Rurouni Kenshin	1996–98	Fuji TV/Cartoon Network	distribution only; produced by Gallop, Studio Deen, and SPE Visual Works
AXN: Action TV	1998	Fox Family Channel	co-production with GRB Studios
Totally Tooned In	1999–2000	Syndication	co-production with Associated Images
Mysterious Ways	2000–02	NBC/PAX TV; CTV	distribution outside of the U.S. and Canada only; produced by Lions Gate Television and Paxson Entertainment
Tequila and Bonetti	2000	Italia 1	co-production with Mastrofilm and MediaTrade
Cyborg 009	2001	TV Tokyo	produced by TV Tokyo and licensed by Avex, Inc. in North America
Dan Dare: Pilot of the Future	2001	Channel 5	co-production with The Dan Dare Corporation
RockFace	2002–03	BBC One	co-production with BBC Scotland and Union Pictures
Monkey Typhoon	2002–03	TV Tokyo	distribution only; produced by Studio Egg and Avex
AXN Shakedown	2004–06	AXN	co-production with North One Television
Sea of Souls	2004–07	BBC One	co-production with BBC Scotland and Carnival Films
Casados con hijos (Colombia)	2004–05	Caracol Televisión	
Hex	2004–05	Sky One	co-production with Shine TV
Dragons' Den	2005–present	BBC Two/BBC One	co-production with BBC Studios Factual Entertainment Productions
Casados con hijos (Argentina)	2005–06	Telefe	co-production with Telefe Contenidos
Blood+	2005–06	MBS/TBS/Cartoon Network (Adult Swim)	distribution only; produced by Production I.G
The New Captain Scarlet	2005	ITV	co-production with Anderson Entertainment and Indestructible Production Company
Zorro: The Sword and the Rose	2007	Caracol Television; Telemundo	co-production with RTI Colombia and Zorro Productions, Inc.
The Pyramid Game	2007	Challenge	
The Tudors	2007–10	Showtime; CBC; BBC Two	International distribution only; produced by Reveille Productions, Octagon Films, Working Title Television, Peace Arch Entertainment, Showtime Networks and Canadian Broadcasting Corporation
Los Simuladores	2008–09	Televisa	
Power of 10	2008	Nine Network	co-produced by FremantleMedia Australia
Six Degrees of X	2008	AXN	co-production with Base Camp Films
Viper's Creed	2009	Animax/BS11/G4	distribution only; produced by AIC Spirits and Digital Frontier

=== Silver River Productions ===
- Respectable (2006)
- Pulling (2006–09)
- Say No to the Knife (2007)
- The Diets That Time Forgot (2008)
- The Supersizers... (2008–09)
- Natural Born Sellers (2008)
- How TV Changed Britain (2008)
- Grow Your Own Drugs (2009–10)
- I'm Running Sainsbury's (2009)
- Kevin McCoy's Grand Tour of Europe (2009)
- Little Crackers (2010–2012) (co-production with Tiger Aspect Productions, Sprout Pictures, Renegade Pictures, Avalon Television, Blue Door Adventures, Can Communicate and Phil Mclntyre Pictures)
- A Question of Taste (2012)
- What Makes a Masterpiece (2012)
- Hidden Talent (2012)
- Antiques Uncovered (2012)
- Harlots, Housewives & Heroines: A 17th Century History for Girls (2012)
- Cherry Healey: Old Before My Time (2013)
- Shut Your Facebook (2014)
- The Big Allotment Challenge (2014–15)
- Nick & Margaret: Too Many Immigrants? (2014)
- Russia's Lost Princesses (2014)
- Dancing Cheek to Cheek: An Intimate History of Dance (2014)
- Confessions of a Copper (2014)

=== Electric Ray ===
Title	Years	Network	Notes
Close to the Edge	2015	BBC Four	
Prized Apart	2015	BBC One	
Natural Born Winners	2016	BBC Two	
Carjackers	2016–17	E4	
Bromans	2017	ITV2	
Doodlebugs	2017–18	BBC One	
Britain in Bloom	2018–19	BBC Two	
Million Pound Menu	2018–19	BBC Two	
Alone at Home	2018	Channel 4	
Call That Hard Work?	2020	BBC One	
Celeb Cooking School	2022–24	E4	Series 1 co-production with Motion Content Group; Produced by Sony Pictures Television in series 2

=== 2waytraffic ===
- Winning Lines (1999–2004) (co-production with Dick Clark Productions)
- Who Wants to Be a Millionaire: Canadian Edition (2000) (co-production with CTV Television Network, Valleycrest Productions, and Buena Vista Television)
- The People Versus (2000–02)
- Quiz $ Millionaire (2000–13)
- Brainiest (2001–02)
- Grand Slam (2003)
- You Are What You Eat (2004–07, 2009)
- That's the Question (2006–07) (co-production with Scott Sternberg Productions)
- Take It or Leave It (2006–08) (co-production with Intellygents)
- That's the Question (British) (2007) (co-production with Intellygents)
- Last One Standing (2007–08)
- All Star Mr & Mrs (2008–16)
- Qui veut gagner des millions ? (2008–16)
- Who Wants to Be a Millionaire? New Zealand (2008)
- Pyramid (2009–14)
- Who Wants to Be a Millionaire? (Philippine) (2009–15)

=== Fable Pictures ===
Title	Years	Network	Notes
Anne Boleyn	2021	Channel 5	co-production with Sony Pictures Television
Hullraisers	2022–23	Channel 4	co-production with Sony Pictures Television, Dori Media International and Yoav Gross Productions
Mr Loverman	2024	BBC One	
The Cadburys	TBA	BritBox; UKTV	co-production with Alfresco Pictures

=== Eleventh Hour Films ===
Title	Years	Network	Notes
Foyle's War	2000–15	ITV	Series 7–8
Safe House	2015–17	ITV	
New Blood	2016	BBC One	
Alex Rider	2020–24	Amazon Prime Video/Amazon Freevee	co-production with Sony Pictures Television
Magpie Murders	2022	BritBox	co-production with Masterpiece and Salt Films
Robyn Hood	2023	Global Television Network	co-production with Corus Entertainment, Boat Rocker Studios and Luti Media
The Killing Kind	2023	Paramount+	co-production with Sony Pictures Television
Rebus	2024	Viaplay	co-production with Viaplay Group
Moonflower Murders	2024	BBC One	co-production with BBC Studios and Masterpiece
Nine Bodies in a Mexican Morgue	2025	MGM+	co-production with MGM+ Studios and Sony Pictures Television
New Haven	TBA	TBA	co-production with Hill 5.14
The House Hunt	TBA	TBA	
A Barrister for the Earth	TBA	TBA	

=== Teleset ===
Title	Years	Network	Notes
La Baby Sister	2000–01	Caracol Televisión	
El Factor X	2005–11; 2021–22	RCN Television	
Factor Xs	2006–11	RCN Television	
Amor en custodia	2009–10	RCN Television	
Rosario Tijeras	2010	RCN Television	
3 milagros	2011–12	RCN Television	
Doctor SOS	2011–13	RCN Television	
Colombia Tiene Talento	2012–13	RCN Television	
Atrevete a Cantar	2012	Caracol Televisión; MundoFox	
El Mariachi	2014	AXN	co-production with Sony Pictures Television
Metástasis	2014	UniMás; Caracol Televisión	co-production with Sony Pictures Television; Based on Breaking Bad
Miss Dynamite	2015	TNT Latin America	co-production with Sony Pictures Television and Televisa
Lady, la vendedora de rosas	2015	RCN Televisión	co-production with Sony Pictures Television
La querida del Centauro	2016–17	Telemundo	co-production with Telemundo Studios and Sony Pictures Television
The Queen of Flow	2018–21	Netflix	co-production with Sony Pictures Television
La reina soy yo	2019	Las Estrellas	co-production with Sony Pictures Television

=== Gogglebox Entertainment ===
Title	Years	Network	Notes
Move Like Michael Jackson	2009	BBC Three	co-production with Fever Media
Trust Me, I'm a Dealer	2009–11	BBC One	
Gerry's Big Decision	2009	Channel 4	
Impossible?	2011	Channel 5	co-production with GroupM Entertainment
The Exit List	2012	ITV1	co-production with Victory Television
Release the Hounds	2013–18	ITV2	Series 1–2
Singing in the Rainforest	2015	Sky One	
The Code	2016–17	BBC One	Series 1

=== Victory Television ===
Title	Years	Network	Notes
The Exit List	2012	ITV1	co-production with Gogglebox Entertainment
Five Minutes to a Fortune	2013	Channel 4	
Tough Young Teachers	2014	BBC Three	
Draw It!	2014	Channel 4	
Benchmark	2015	Channel 4	

=== Stolen Picture ===
Title	Years	Network	Notes
Out of Her Mind	2020	BBC Two	
Truth Seekers	2020	Amazon Prime Video	co-production with Sony Pictures Television and Amazon Studios

=== Left Bank Pictures ===
Title	Years	Network	Notes
Wallander	2008–16	BBC One	co-production with Yellow Bird and TKBC
Father & Son	2009	RTÉ One	
School of Comedy	2009–10	E4	
Married Single Other	2010	ITV	
Strike Back	2010–2020	Sky One; Cinemax	
DCI Banks	2010–16	ITV	
Zen	2011	BBC One	co-production with Mediaset, Masterpiece and ZDF
Mad Dogs	2011–13	Sky One	co-production with Palma Pictures
Cardinal Burns	2012–14	E4/Channel 4	
The Ice Cream Girls	2013	ITV	
Outlander	2014–26	Starz	co-production with Sony Pictures Television, Story Mining & Supply Company and Tall Ship Productions
Mad Dogs US	2015–16	Amazon Prime Video	co-production with Sony Pictures Television, Amazon Studios, MiddKid Productions and Chris Cole Productions
The Crown	2016–23	Netflix	co-production with Sony Pictures Television
The Replacement	2017	BBC One	
The Halcyon	2017	ITV	
Pls Like	2017–21	BBC Three	co-production with Shiny Button Productions and Baby Cow Productions
Philip K. Dick's Electric Dreams	2017	Channel 4 Amazon Prime Video	co-production with Sony Pictures Television, Amazon Studios, Channel 4 Television, Electric Shepherd Productions, Rooney McP Productions, Anonymous Content, Tall Ship Productions and Moon Shot Entertainment
Origin	2018	YouTube Premium	co-production with Sony Pictures Television, CiTVC and Midnight Radio
Quiz	2020	ITV; AMC	co-production with AMC Networks
White Lines	2020	Netflix	co-production with Sony Pictures Television and Vancouver Media
Behind Her Eyes	2021	Netflix	co-production with Sony Pictures Television
The Fear Index	2022	Sky Atlantic	co-production with Sky Studios
Three Pines	2022	Amazon Prime Video	co-production with Sony Pictures Television and Amazon Studios
Without Sin	2022	ITVX	co-production with BYO Films
Who Is Erin Carter?	2023	Netflix	co-production with Sony Pictures Television
Everything Now	2023	Netflix	co-production with Sony Pictures Television
Insomnia	2024	Paramount+	co-production with Build Your Own Films and Sony Pictures Television
This City Is Ours	2025–present	BBC One	
Dept. Q	2025–present	Netflix	co-production with Flitcraft and Sony Pictures Television
Outlander: Blood of My Blood	2025–present	Starz	co-production with Story Mining & Supply Company, Tall Ship Productions, No Fooling Productions Inc. and Sony Pictures Television
The Lady	2026	ITVX; BritBox	
Dear England	2026	BBC One	
Palomino	TBA	Netflix	

=== Eleven Film ===
Title	Years	Network	Notes
My Breasts Could Kill Me	2009	Sky One	
Cast Offs	2009	Channel 4	
Glue	2014	E4	
The Enfield Haunting	2015	Sky Living	
Gap Year	2017	E4	co-production with Entertainment One and Ingenious Media
True Horror	2018	Channel 4	
Sex Education	2019–23	Netflix	
Red Rose	2022	BBC Three; Netflix	co-production with Entertainment One
Ten Pound Poms	2023–2025	BBC One; Stan	co-production with Curio Pictures
Stags	2024	Paramount+	
Lord of the Flies	2025	BBC One; Stan	co-production with One Shoe Pictures
If We Were Villains	TBA	TBA	co-production with Blink49 Studios and Cedar Island Films

=== Palladium Fiction ===
Title	Years	Network	Notes
Jordskott	2015–17	SVT	co-production with Pinewood Studios (season 2)
Dröm	2019	SVT	

=== Huaso ===
Title	Years	Network	Notes
Chosen	2018	IQIYI	co-production with Playmaker Media

=== Toro Media ===
- The Voice of Italy (2013–19)
- I re della griglia (2014)
- Shark Tank Italy (2015)
- Top Gear Italia (2016)

=== Stellify Media ===
- Can't Touch This (2016)
- Goodbye House (2017)
- Don't Say It... Bring It! (2017)
- In Solitary: The Anti-Social Experiment (2017)
- Blind Date (2017–2018) (co-production with So Television and Olga TV)
- Blind Date Ireland (2017)
- Beauty Queen and Single (2017–19)
- Who Wants to Be a Millionaire? (2018–present) (co-production with Sony Pictures Television)
- Gino's Win Your Wish List (2018–21)
- Celebs in Solitary (2018)
- Parents' Evening (2018–19)
- Hot Right Now (2018)
- Flinch (2019)
- There's No Place Like Tyrone (2019)
- Secret Body (2019)
- Pretty Single (2020)
- Celebrity Snoop Dogs (2020)
- Who Wants To Be A Millionaire: The Million Pound Question (2020)
- Farm to Feast: Best Menu Wins (2021–present)
- Fastest Finger First (2022) (co-production with Sony Pictures Television)
- Second Hand Style-Up (2023–present)
- Sheepdog Showdown (2024)

=== Floresta Productions ===
Title	Years	Network	Notes
A Fazenda	2009–present	RecordTV	Season 8
E Aí, Doutor?	2011	RecordTV	
Turn Back Your Body Clock	2012	GNT	
Miss Brazil	2012–15	BAND	4 specials
The Ultimate Fighter: Brazil	2012–14	Rede Globo; Fuel TV	Seasons 1–3
Fábrica de Estrelas	2013	Multishow	
Stars Factory	2013	Multishow	
Medicine Secrets	2014–15	Multishow	
Anything for Ratings	2014–16	Multishow	
Fashion Inc	2014	Globo News	
Cooking in the Supermarket	2015–16	Discovery h&h	co-production with Smilehood
Are You the One? Brasil	2015–19	MTV	
Kids Choice Awards Brazil	2015–17	Nickelodeon	3 specials
What Are You Laughing At?	2016	Multishow	
The Elephant in the Room	2016	Multishow	
Renatinho's Freak Show	2016	Multishow	
Central Patrol	2016–17	Multishow	
Power Couple	2016–17	RecordTV	
Hiperatletas	2016	Discovery	
De Férias com o Ex	2016–21	MTV; Amazon Prime Video	co-production with Whizz Kid Entertainment and VIS
Shark Tank Brazil	2016–present	Sony Channel	
Go Fernandinha!	2016–19	Multishow	
Little Comics	2017	Multishow	
Dalila's OCD	2017	Multishow	
Me. Her and a Million Followers	2017	Multishow	
Who Wants to Be a Millionaire Brazil	2017–present	TV Globo	
Lady Night	2017–22	Multishow	
MTV Millenial Awards Brazil	2018–2019	MTV	2 specials
Beyond the Island	2018	Globoplay	
Raid the Cage Brazil	2018	BAND	
Os Donos Da **** Toda	2018	Sony Channel	
NHAC Awards GNT	2018	GNT	
Minha Vida é Kiu#Partiuviagem	2019	GNT	
Top Chef Brasil	2019–23	RecordTV	
Man of the House	2019–23	Multishow	
The Gong Show	2019	Rede Globo	
Game Crashers	2019–23	Gloob	
Wild and Free	2020–present	Amazon Prime Video	
D.R. com o Ex	2020	MTV	
Made in Japão	2020	RecordTV	
In Sickness and in Hell	2020–23	Multishow	
Going to Pass	2020	Multishow	
It's the Flow	2021	Multishow	
The Plan is This	2021	Multishow	
Uncommon Place	2021	Multishow	
No Gás do Just Dance	2021	Multishow	
Tang on Tank	2021	YouTube	
Chat with the Ex	2021	MTV	
De Férias com o Ex Caribe	2022–present	MTV LA/MTV Brazil; Paramount+	co-production with TIS Productions
The Big Shot	2022	Netflix	
Avisa Lá que Eu vou	2022	GNT	
Queer Eye: Brazil	2022	Netflix	
Tunnel of Love	2022	Globoplay	
Alma de Cozinheira	2023–24	GNT	
Use Your Voice	2023	Max	
Ilhados com a Sogra	2023–present	Netflix	Season 2 co-production with Mixer
Rio Connection	2023	Globoplay	
Sábia Ignorância	2024	GNT	
Luz: The Light of the Heart	2024	Netflix	
Divided Youth	2024	Max	
De Férias com o Ex Diretoria	2024	MTV Brazil; Paramount+	co-production with MTV Entertainment Studios
Eliana’s Summer Home	2024	GNT	
Nepograma	2025	YouTube	
My Korean Boyfriend	2025	Netflix	
Madam Beja	2026	HBO Max	
The Panic Room	TBA	Telecine	
Charlie's Angels	TBA	TBA	co-production with Sony Pictures Television Kids

== Sony Pictures Television – Kids ==
Formerly known as Silvergate Media (2011–22).

== Sony Pictures Television – U.S. Networks ==
=== Game Show Enterprises Studios ===
Title	Years	Network	Notes
Super Decades	1997–98	Game Show Network	
Trivia Track	1997–98	Game Show Network	
Faux Pause	1998	Game Show Network	
Extreme Gong	1998–2000	Game Show Network	co-production with Scott Sternberg Productions
When Did That Happen?	1998–99	Game Show Network	
As Seen On...	1998–2000	Game Show Network	
Win TV	1998–2000	Game Show Network	
Inquizition	1998–2001	Game Show Network	co-production with Sande Stewart Television
Throut and Neck	1999	Game Show Network	
All New 3's a Crowd	1999–2000	Game Show Network	co-production with The Gurin Company
DJ Games	2000	Game Show Network	
Lover's Lounge	2000–01	Game Show Network	
Mall Masters	2001	Game Show Network	
Friend or Foe?	2002–2003	Game Show Network	co-production with Buccieri Entertainment
WinTuition	2002–2003	Game Show Network	co-production with LMNO Cable Group, Fair Dinkum Productions and Sugar Bros. Entertainment
Cram	2003	Game Show Network	co-production with Mindless Entertainment and Jonathan Goodson Productions
National Lampoon's Funny Money	2003	Game Show Network	co-production with Budd Freidman Digital, In-Finn-ity Productions and National Lampoon Productions
Fake-a-Date	2004	GSN	
National Lampoon's Greek Games	2004	GSN	
Extreme Dodgeball	2004–05	GSN	co-production with Mindless Entertainment
World Series of Blackjack	2004–07	GSN	
Poker Royale	2004–05	GSN	
Ballbreakers	2005–06	GSN	
High Stakes Poker	2006–07; 2009–11	GSN	currently owned by Poker Central
Anything to Win	2006	GSN	
Starface	2006	GSN	co-production with Locomotion Pictures and Rubicon Entertainment
That's the Question	2006–07	GSN	co-production with Scott Sternberg Productions
Ace in the House	2007	GSN	
Cat-Minster	2007	GSN	
Grand Slam	2007	GSN	co-production with Monkey Kingdom, Embassy Row, and Sony Pictures Television
Camouflage	2007	GSN	co-production with McB Entertainment and Enjoy the Ride Productions
Skin Wars	2014–16	GSN	co-production with Michael Levitt Productions
Emogenius	2017–18	GSN	co-production with Craig Brooks Productions and Larry Barron Entertainment
America Says	2018–22; 2026-present	Game Show Network	co-production with Entertainment One and Keller Noll
Common Knowledge	2019–2021	Game Show Network	
Best Ever Trivia Show	2019	Game Show Network	
Master Minds	2020–23	Game Show Network	
People Puzzler	2021–23	Game Show Network	co-production with Start Entertainment and Dotdash Meredith
Tug of Words	2021–23	Game Show Network	co-production with Embassy Row
Switch	2023–24	Game Show Network	co-production with DIGA Studios
Split Second	2023–24	Game Show Network	co-production with Marcus/Glass Productions; Distributed by Fremantle
Hey Yahoo	2023	Game Show Network	co-production with Yahoo, Sweet Lemons, LLC and Big Potato Limited
Blank Slate	2024	Game Show Network	co-production with Heath Street Media and Viamar Productions
Beat the Bridge	2024–present	Game Show Network	co-production with STV Studios
Flip Side	2024–present	Game Show Network	co-production with Keller/Noll and Courtside Creative; Distributed by CBS Media Ventures
Tic-Tac-Dough	2025–present	Game Show Network	co-production with NBCUniversal Syndication Studios and Village Roadshow Television
Bingo Blitz	2025–present	Game Show Network	co-production with Playtika

=== Crunchyroll Studios ===
Title	Years	Network	Notes
Onyx Equinox	2020	Crunchyroll	
High Guardian Spice	2021	Crunchyroll	
FreakAngels	2022	Crunchyroll	
Meiji Gekken: 1874	2024	Crunchyroll	

== Sony Pictures Home Entertainment ==
Title	Years	Network	Notes
The Little Prince	2010–14	France 2 WDR; TSR; Rai 2/Rai Yoyo	Seasons 1–2 co-production with Method Animation, DQ Entertainment, Rai Fiction, LP Animation, La Fabrique D'Images (seasons 1–2), AB Productions (season 3), ARD and SES S.A.

== Sony Pictures Digital ==
Title	Years	Network	Notes
The Critic	2000–01	AtomFilms; Shockwave.com	Webisodes co-production with Gracie Films
Sweet J Presents	2001	ScreenBlast	co-production with ShadowMachine
El Macho	2001	ScreenBlast	
Lenore, the Cute Little Dead Girl	2002	ScreenBlast	co-production with Adelaide Productions
Robot Chicken	2005–present	Adult Swim	Seasons 1–5; Continued by Sony Pictures Television from 2012–2021 and 2025–present co-production with ShadowMachine (seasons 1–5), Stoopid Monkey, Stoopid Buddy Stoodios (season 6–present), and Williams Street

== Sony Wonder ==
In 2000, Sony Music sold the television assets of Sony Wonder to TV-Loonland AG. As part of the sale, Sony kept the North American home video and international audio rights to its series. Sony Wonder's television library is currently owned by M4E AG, a subsidiary of Studio 100.

Title	Years	Network	Notes
The Beginner's Bible	1995	Direct-to-video	co-production with Time Life Video & Television and Jumbo Pictures
Hoyt 'n Andy's Sportsbender	1995–96	RTÉ2	co-production with Jumbo Pictures and ESPN
Baby, It's You	1996	Direct-to-video	
The Kidsongs Television Show	1997–98	Syndication	seasons 3–4 only; co-production with Together Again Video Productions (owner)
The Brothers Flub	1999–2000	Nickelodeon	co-production with Sunbow Entertainment, Ravensburger Film + TV and Videal
Angel Wings	1999	Direct-to-video	co-production with Tyndale Entertainment and Mike Young Productions
Mega Babies	1999–2000	Fox Family	co-production with CinéGroupe and Landmark Entertainment Group
Wondrous Myths & Legends	1999–2000	Direct-to-video	co-production with D'Ocon Films Production
Rainbow Fish	2000	HBO Family	co-production with EM.TV & Merchandising AG and Decode Entertainment
Fat Dog Mendoza	2000–01	Cartoon Network (UK)	co-production with Sunbow Entertainment and TMO-Loonland Film GmbH
Generation O!	2000–01	Kids' WB	co-production with Sunbow Entertainment, RTV Family Entertainment and Cuckoo's Nest Studio

== Television films and specials ==
=== Sony Pictures Television ===
- Tales of Frankenstein (1958)
- Bitter Heritage (1958)
- Scalplock (1966)
- Shadow on the Land (1968)
- Three's a Crowd (1969)
- In Name Only (1969)
- Gidget Grows Up (1969)
- The Feminist and the Fuzz (1971)
- Black Noon (1971)
- Brian's Song (1971)
- The Sheriff (1971)
- Gidget Gets Married (1972)
- Call Holme (1972)
- The Catcher (1972)
- Man on a String (1972)
- Call Her Mom (1972)
- The Cat Creature (1973)
- Jarrett (1973)
- The Girl on the Late, Late Show (1974)
- QB VII (1974)
- Sorority Kill (1974)
- The Last Angry Man (1974)
- The Story of Jacob and Joseph (1974)
- The Last Survivors (1975)
- The First 36 Hours of Dr. Durant (1975)
- A Matter of Wife... and Death (1975)
- Journey from Darkness (1975)
- Medical Story (1975)
- Cop on the Beat (1975)
- The Turning Point of Jim Malloy (1975)
- The Owl and the Pussycat (1975) (pilot)
- Cage Without a Key (1975)
- Valley Forge (1975)
- Kiss Me, Kill Me (1976)
- The Lindbergh Kidnapping Case (1976)
- The Quest (1976)
- The Quest: The Longest Drive (1976)
- The Quest: The Longest Drive 2 (1976)
- Banjo Hackett: Roamin’ Free (1976)
- The Story of David (1976)
- Contract on Cherry Street (1977)
- Cover Girls (1977)
- The Making of 'The Deep' (1977)
- The Father Knows Best Reunion (1977)
- Kill Me If You Can (1977)
- Corey: For the People (1977)
- Roger & Harry: The Mitera Target (1977)
- The Magnificent Magical Magnet of Santa Mesa (1977)
- Never Con a Killer (1977)
- A Killing Affair (1977)
- In the Glitter Palace (1977)
- The Deadly Triangle (1977)
- The Last Hurrah (1977)
- Father Knows Best: Home for Christmas (1977)
- Ziegfeld: The Man and His Women (1978)
- Doctors' Private Lives (1978)
- The Courage and the Passion (1978)
- To Kill a Cop (1978)
- Crisis in Sun Valley (1978)
- Keefer (1978)
- Go West, Young Girl (1978)
- Last of the Good Guys (1978)
- Space Force (1978) (pilot)
- More Than Friends (1978)
- A Fire in the Sky (1978)
- Goldie and the Boxer (1979)
- Undercover with the KKK (1979)
- A Shining Season (1979)
- Institute for Revenge (1979)
- Women at West Point (1979)
- From Here to Eternity (1979)
- The Incredible Journey of Doctor Meg Laurel (1979)
- The Legend of the Golden Gun (1979)
- Fast Friends (1979)
- Pleasure Cove (1979)
- The Billion Dollar Threat (1979)
- The Child Stealer (1979)
- Breaking Up is Hard to Do (1979)
- The Night the City Screamed (1980)
- Police Story: Confessions of a Lady Cop (1980)
- Alex and the Doberman Gang (1980)
- Detour to Terror (1980)
- Reunion (1980)
- To Find My Son (1980)
- Beulah Land (1980)
- Power (1980)
- Once Upon a Spy (1980)
- The Curse of King Tut's Tomb (1980)
- Terror Among Us (1981)
- Fallen Angel (1981)
- The Oklahoma City Dolls (1981)
- Family Reunion (1981)
- Goldie and the Boxer Go to Hollywood (1981)
- Dear Teacher (1981) (pilot)
- Elvis and the Beauty Queen (1981)
- Goliath Awaits (1981)
- Ivanhoe (1982)
- Money on the Side (1982)
- The Shadow Riders (1982)
- The Neighborhood (1982)
- Life of the Party: The Story of Beatrice (1982)
- Ain't Misbehavin' (1982)
- Lights! Camera! Annie! (1982, with Rastar Films)
- The Blue and the Gray (1982)
- The Hunchback of Notre (1982) (distribution only)
- I, Desire (1982)
- Murder Me, Murder You (1983)
- Running Out (1983)
- Sadat (1983)
- Malibu (1983)
- Cocaine and Blue Eyes (1983)
- The Master of Ballantrae (1984) (distribution only)
- More Than Murder (1984)
- A Touch of Scandal (1984)
- It Came Upon the Midnight Clear (1984)
- Robert Kennedy and His Times (1985)
- Deceptions (1985)
- Hell Town (1985)
- Deadly Messages (1985)
- Jenny's War (1985)
- The Eagle and the Bear (1985)
- The Steel Collar Man (1985)
- Brotherly Love (1985)
- Alice in Wonderland (1985) (distribution only)
- Reunion at Fairborough (1985) (distribution only)
- The Other Lover (1985)
- Gidget's Summer Reunion (1985)
- Robert Kennedy and His Times (1985)
- I Dream of Jeannie... Fifteen Years Later (1985)
- A Winner Never Quits (1986)
- The Return of Mickey Spillane's Mike Hammer (1986)
- There Must Be a Pony (1986)
- Pleasures (1986)
- Picnic (1986)
- Stranded (1986)
- Miracle of the Heart: A Boys Town Story (1986)
- Kate's Secret (1986)
- The Canterville Ghost (1986)
- Passion Flower (1986)
- Outrage! (1986)
- Intimate Encounters (1986)
- There Must Be a Pony (1986)
- Still Crazy Like a Fox (1987)
- Three Wishes for Jamie (1987)
- Hammer: The Studio That Dripped Blood! (1987)
- Police Story: The Freeway Killings (1987)
- Something Is Out There (1988)
- Police Story: The Watch Commander (1988)
- Out of Time (1988)
- Weekend War (1988)
- Maigret (1988)
- Freedom Fighter (1988)
- Police Story: Monster Manor (1988)
- Police Story: Burnout (1988)
- Police Story: Gladiator School (1988)
- Intrigue (1988)
- The Diamond Trap (1988)
- Higher Ground (1988)
- The People Across the Lake (1988)
- The Taking of Flight 847: The Uli Derickson Story (1988)
- Police Story: Cop Killers (1988)
- The Caine Mutiny Court-Martial (1988)
- Mike Hammer: Murder Takes All (1989)
- Houndtown (1989) (pilot)
- Flying Blind (1989)
- Cast the First Stone (1989)
- Dark Avenger (1990)
- Murder in Paradise (1990)
- And the Sea Will Tell (1991)
- Switched at Birth (1991)
- The Whereabouts of Jenny (1991)
- Us (1991)
- All in the Family: 20th Anniversary Special (1991)
- Passion (1991)
- I Still Dream of Jeannie (1991)
- Christmas on Division Street (1991)
- Revolver (1992)
- Journey to the Center of the Earth (1993)
- Barbarians at the Gate (1993)
- Miracle on Interstate 880 (1993)
- Hart to Hart Returns (1993)
- Hart to Hart: Home is Where the Hart Is (1994)
- The Cosby Mysteries (1994)
- Hart to Hart: Crimes of the Hart (1994)
- Baby Brokers (1994)
- Hart to Hart: Old Friends Never Die (1994)
- Hart to Hart: Secrets of the Hart (1995)
- Hart to Hart: Secrets of the Hart (1995)
- Hart to Hart: Two Harts in 3/4 Time (1995)
- The Witching Hour (1996)
- Hart to Hart: Harts in High Season (1996)
- Hart to Hart: Till Death Do Us Hart (1996)
- Born Free: A New Adventure (1996) (co-production with Franklin/Waterman and Movieworld)
- For Hope (1996) (co-production with Brillstein-Grey Entertainment)
- Sudden Terror: The Hijacking of School Bus 17 (1996)
- Into Thin Air: Death on Everest (1997) (co-production with Sofronski Productions and Stillking Films)
- Medusa's Child (1997)
- Crowned and Dangerous (1997)
- Final Descent (1997)
- Bad As I Wanna Be: The Dennis Rodman Story (1998)
- The Long Island Incident (1998)
- Come On, Get Happy: The Partridge Family Story (1999)
- Double Platinum (1999)
- A Memory in My Heart (1999)
- Having Our Say: The Delany Sisters' First 100 Years (1999)
- Swing Vote (1999)
- Blue Moon (1999)
- First Daughter (1999)
- Final Run (1999)
- A.T.F. (1999)
- Annie (1999) (co-production with Walt Disney Television, Chris Montan Productions and Storyline Entertainment)
- Beyond the Prairie: The True Story of Laura Ingalls Wilder (2000)
- The Three Stooges (2000) (co-production with Comedy III Productions, Icon Productions and Storyline Entertainment)
- A Father's Choice (2000)
- Songs in Ordinary Time (2000)
- Sole Survivor (2000)
- Miracle on the Mountain: The Kincaid Family Story (2000)
- Picnic (2000)
- Days of Our Lives' 35th Anniversary (2000)
- First Target (2000)
- The Beach Boys: An American Family (2000)
- The Crossing (2000)
- Shutterspeed (2000)
- The Linda McCartney Story (2000)
- These Old Broads (2001)
- Call Me Claus (2001)
- Brian's Song (2001)
- The Princess and the Marine (2001)
- What Makes a Family (2001)
- Kiss My Act (2001)
- Days of Our Lives' Christmas' (2001)
- Midwives (2001) (co-production with Craig Anderson Productions)
- The Facts of Life Reunion (2001) (co-production with Walt Disney Television, Berger Queen Productions and Laurence Mark Productions)
- Beyond the Prairie, Part 2: The True Story of Laura Ingalls Wilder (2002)
- Two Against Time (2002) (co-production with Open Road Productions and Let's Pretend Productions)
- First Shot (2002) (co-production with Mandalay Television and Lionsgate Television)
- Dancing at the Harvest Moon (2002) (co-production with Bayonne Entertainment)
- Murder in Greenwich (2002)
- Martin and Lewis (2002)
- The Reagans (2003)
- Red Water (2003) (co-production with New Line Television)
- Lucy (2003)
- The Perfect Husband: The Laci Peterson Story (2004) (co-production with Modern Videofilm Inc., Sokolow Company and Stu Segall Productions)
- The Brooke Ellison Story (2004)
- Deceit (2004)
- Revenge of the Middle-Aged Woman (2004) (co-production with Dan Wigutow Productions)
- Suburban Madness (2004)
- Ike: Countdown to D-Day (2004)
- Raising Waylon (2004)
- The Hunt for the BTK Killer (2005)
- Faith of My Fathers (2005)
- Jesse Stone: Stone Cold (2005) (co-production with Brandman Productions)
- Jesse Stone: Night Passage (2006) (co-production with Brandman Productions)
- Not Like Everyone Else (2006)
- Touch the Top of the World (2006)
- Fatal Contact: Bird Flu in America (2006)
- Relative Chaos (2006)
- Wedding Wars (2006)
- Jesse Stone: Death in Paradise (2006) (co-production with Brandman Productions)
- Jesse Stone: Sea Change (2007)
- Kings of South Beach (2007)
- Comanche Moon (2008)
- A Raisin in the Sun (2008)
- Flirting with Forty (2008)
- America (2009)
- Jesse Stone: Thin Ice (2009)
- Gifted Hands: The Ben Carson Story (2009)
- Natalee Holloway (2009)
- Sundays at Tiffany's (2010)
- Who Is Clark Rockefeller? (2010)
- Jesse Stone: No Remorse (2010)
- The Craigslist Killer (2011)
- Justice for Natalee Holloway (2011)
- Jesse Stone: Innocents Lost (2011)
- Five (2011)
- Steel Magnolias (2012)
- Jesse Stone: Benefit of the Doubt (2012)
- Drew Peterson: Untouchable (2012)
- Aladdin and the Death Lamp (2012)
- Hannah's Law (2012)
- Left to Die (2012)
- TalhotBlond (2012)
- Hatfields & McCoys (2012)
- Blue Lagoon: The Awakening (2012)
- The Anna Nicole Story (2013)
- Call Me Crazy: A Five Film (2013)
- Divorce: A Love Story (2013)
- Doubt (2013)
- The Vatican (2013)
- Brenda Forever (2013)
- The Sound of Music Live! (2013) (co-production with Storyline Entertainment and Universal Television)
- Jacked Up (2013)
- Gaffigan (2013)
- Bonnie & Clyde (2013)
- Irreversible (2014)
- Sea of Fire (2014)
- Bambi Cottages (2014)
- In My Dreams (2014)
- Wild Blue (2014)
- Cuz-Bros (2014)
- Outlaw Prophet: Warren Jeffs (2014)
- The Gabby Douglas Story (2014)
- Lizzie Borden Took an Ax (2014)
- With This Ring (2015)
- Jesse Stone: Lost in Paradise (2015)
- Beautiful & Twisted (2015)
- Cleveland Abduction (2015)
- The Wiz Live! (2015) (co-production with Universal Television and Storyline Entertainment)
- A Christmas Melody (2015) (co-production with Brad Krevoy Television, Motion Picture Corporation of America and Hallmark Channel)
- Mother, May I Sleep with Danger? (2016)
- Surviving Compton: Dre, Suge & Michel'le (2016) (co-production with ThinkFactory Media)
- Hairspray Live! (2016) (co-production with Warner Bros. Television, Universal Television, New Line Cinema and Storyline Entertainment)
- Real Life (2017)
- Distefano (2017)
- Flint (2017)
- Kansas City (2018)
- History of Them (2018)
- Jesus Christ Superstar Live in Concert (2018) (co-production with Universal Television, Storyline Entertainment and Marc Platt Productions)
- Ball Street (2018)
- Chiefs (2018)
- Love You to Death (2019)
- Very Valentine (2019) (co-production with The Sanitsky Company)
- Escaping the NXIVM Cult: A Mother's Fight to Save Her Daughter (2019)
- 25 (2019)
- El Camino: A Breaking Bad Movie (2019)
- Patsy & Loretta (2019)
- Chris Watts: Confessions of a Killer (2020) (co-production with Peace Out Productions)
- Poisoned Love: The Stacey Castor Story (2020) (co-production with Wishing Floor Films, Lighthouse Pictures and Frank Von Zerneck Films)
- Happy Endings Virtual Reunion (2020)
- Mariah Carey's Magical Christmas Special (2020) (distribution only for Syndication; produced by Done and Dusted Productions)
- Salt-N-Pepa (2021) (co-production with Flavor Unit Entertainment)
- The Long Island Serial Killer: A Mother's Hunt for Justice (2021) (co-production with Lighthouse Pictures and Happily Ever After Films)
- Secrets of a Marine's Life (2021) (co-production with Front Street Pictures and Peace Out Productions)
- Doomsday Mom: The Lori Vallow Story (2021) (co-production with EveryWhere Studios, Lighthouse Pictures and Peace Out Productions)
- Annie Live! (2021) (co-production with Chloe Productions, The Green Room and Zadan/Meron Productions)
- Days of Our Lives: A Very Salem Christmas (2021)
- A Christmas Spark (2022) (co-production with Lighthouse Pictures)
- Mariah Carey: Merry Christmas to All! (The TV Concert Special) (2022) (co-production with CBS Media Ventures, Sony Music Entertainment and Supply&Demand Productions)
- How to Murder Your Husband: The Nancy Brophy Story (2023) (co-production with Front Street Pictures and Peace Out Productions)

==== TriStar Television ====
- Werewolf (1987)
- Three on a Match (1987)
- Danger Down Under (1988)
- A Child Lost Forever: The Jerry Sherwood Story (1992)
- From the Files of Joseph Wambaugh: A Jury of One (1992) (co-production with Grossbart Barnett Productions)
- Stormy Weathers (1992)
- Trial: The Price of Passion (1992)
- Casualties of Love: The Long Island Lolita Story (1993)
- Fugitive Nights: Danger in the Desert (1993)
- Staying Afloat (1993)
- Boy Meets Girl (1993)
- Fallen Champ: The Untold Story of Mike Tyson (1993)
- Menendez: A Killing in Beverly Hills (1994)
- The Disappearance of Vonnie (1994)
- Next Door (1994)
- Sahara (1995)
- Pins and Needles (1995)
- Never Say Never: The Deidre Hall Story (1995)
- Abandoned and Deceived (1995)
- Serving in Silence: The Margarethe Cammermeyer Story (1995)
- Annie: A Royal Adventure! (1995; co-production with Rastar Productions)
- To Sir, with Love II (1996)
- 919 Fifth Avenue (1996)
- Mother, May I Sleep with Danger? (1996)
- Secrets of the Bermuda Triangle (1996)
- The Hunchback (1997) (distribution only)
- Intensity (1997)
- The Advocate's Devil (1997)
- Home Invasion (1997)

==== Spelling-Goldberg Productions ====
- The Daughters of Joshua Cabe (1972)
- No Place to Run (1972)
- Say Goodbye, Maggie Cole (1972)
- The Bounty Man (1972)
- Home for the Holidays (1972)
- A Cold Night's Death (1973)
- Snatched (1973)
- The Great American Beauty Contest (1973)
- The Bait (1973)
- The Letters (1973)
- Satan's School for Girls (1973)
- Hijack (1973)
- Letters from Three Lovers (1973)
- The Affair (1973)
- The Girl Who Came Gift-Wrapped (1974)
- The Death Squad (1974)
- Cry Panic (1974)
- Savages (1974)
- Death Sentence (1974)
- Hit Lady (1974)
- Death Cruise (1974)
- Only with Married Men (1974)
- The Daughters of Joshua Cabe Return (1975)
- Murder on Flight 502 (1975)
- The Legend of Valentino (1975)
- One of My Wives is Missing (1976)
- Charlie's Angels (1976)
- The New Daughters of Joshua Cabe (1976)
- Death at Love House (1976)
- 33 Hours in the Life of God (1976)
- The Sad and Lonely Sundays (1976)
- The Boy in the Plastic Bubble (1976)
- Little Ladies of the Night (1977)
- Beach Patrol (1979)

==== ELP Communications ====
- Please Don't Hit Me, Mom (1981)
- I Love Liberty (1982)
- The Facts of Life Goes to Paris (1982)
- Eleanor, First Lady of the World (1982)
- An Invasion of Privacy (1983)
- Grace Kelly (1983)
- A Doctor's Story (1984)
- Heartsounds (1984)
- Kane & Abel (1985)
- Firefighter (1986)
- The Facts of Life Down Under (1987) (co-production with Crawford Productions)
- Guilty of Innocence: The Lenell Geter Story (1987)

==== Merv Griffin Enterprises ====
- Secrets Men Never Share (1988)

==== Embassy Row ====
- Balls of Steel (2007)
- Ellen's Really Big Show (2007)
- 20 Under 20: Transforming Tomorrow (2012)
- Bates Motel: After Hours (2014) A&E two specials
- Jerry Before Seinfeld (2017)

=== Sony Pictures Television – International Production ===
==== Stellify Media ====
- Space Truckers (2017)
- A Taste of Home (2018) (co-production with Alfo-Mic Productions)
- Barbershop for Bald Men (2021)
- Fast Food Face Off (2021)

==== Eleven Film ====
- Candid Cameron (2006)
- Make Me a Virgin (2007) (co-production with Nobles Gate)
- First Cut: Cyber-Skiving (2007)
- Being Maxine Carr (2008) (co-production with Renegade Pictures)
- The Murder of Billie-Jo (2008)
- Rick and Peter (2011)
- The Secret Life of the Pub (2015)
- Rotters (2015)

==== Gogglebox Entertainment ====
- The Untold Tommy Cooper (2011) (co-production with Noel Gay Television)
- Frankie Howerd: The Lost Tapes (2013)

==== Left Bank Pictures ====
- Loving Miss Hatto (2012)
- Oasis (2017) (co-production with Amazon Studios)
- Tommy Cooper: Not Like That, Like This (2014)
- Sitting in Limbo (2020)

==== Silver River Productions ====
- 9/11: Out of the Blue (2006)
- 638 Way to Kill Castro (2006)
- Fat Man's Warning (2007)
- The Million Pound Footballers' Giveaway (2007)
- Off by Heart (2009)
- One Night in Emergency (2010)
- Giles and Sue's Royal Wedding (2011)
- Sargeant on Spike (2012)
- Elizabeth Taylor: The Auction of a Lifetime (2012)
- Off by Heart: Shakespeare (2012)
- Sex Story: Fifty Shades of Grey (2012) (co-production with Mox Productions)
- The Smiths (2013)
- Conned, Fleeced and Left for Broke (2014)
- Caught with Their Fingers in the Till (2014)

==== Electric Ray ====
- How Rich Are You? (2014)
- News Crack (2018) (co-production with Mother's Best Child)

==== Floresta Productions ====
- Born to Fight (2014)
- Tomorrowland (2015)

=== Sony Pictures Television – Nonfiction ===
- The Disappearance of Shere Hite (2023)

==== Sharp Entertainment ====
- Great Things About the Holidays (2005)
- Halloween's Most Extreme (2007)
- The iPod Revolution (2007)
- 25 Biggest Real Estate Mistakes (2008)
- Extreme Mind-Blowing Hotels (2008)
- Extreme Ways to Go Green (2008)
- Buying and Selling: 20 Best Kept Secrets (2009)
- The Tragic Side of Comedy (2009)
- 13 Scarier Movie Moments (2009)
- Fame and Recovery (2010)
- Extreme Couponing (2010)
- The Tragic Side of Fame (2011)
- Large, Dangerous, Rocket Ships (2011)
- Halloween Crazy (2011)
- Christmas Crazy (2011)
- Extreme Couponing Black Friday Blitz (2012)
- Extreme Couponing: Midnight Madness (2012)
- Extreme Couponing: Holiday Hauls (2012)
- Hollywood's Most Notorious Crimes (2012)
- Halloween Crazier (2012)
- Lost Magic Decoded (2012) (co-production with Peter Greenberg Worldwide)
- Christmas Crazier (2012)
- Instant Christmas (2012)
- JonBenet's Mother: Victim or Killer (2016)
- Germophobia (2021)

==== 19 Entertainment ====
- Back to the 50's (1999) (co-production with Steelhead Productions)
- Boyfriends & Birthdays (1999) (co-production with Steelhead Productions)
- Artistic Differences (2000)
- An American Idol Christmas (2003) (co-production with FremantleMedia North America)
- Victoria Beckham: Coming to America (2007)
- Born in the USA (2007)
- Giving You Everything (2007)
- Santa Cruz (2010) (co-production with Factory Films)

==== B17 Entertainment ====
- #Graduation2020: Facebook and Instagram Celebrate the Class of 2020 (2020)
- TikTok LIVE New Years Eve (2020)

==== The Intellectual Property Corporation (IPC) ====
- The Swamp (2020)
- This Is Paris (2020)
- Truth & Lies: The Crocodile of Wall Street? (2022)

==== This Machine Filmworks ====
- Elton John Live: Farewell From Dodger Stadium (2022)
- Anthem (2023)
- The Disappearance of Shere Hite (2023)
- South to Black Power (2023)
- Martha (2024)
- Elton John: Never Too Late (2024)
- Karol G: Tomorrow Was Beautiful (2025)
- Lee Soo Man: King of K-Pop (2025)
- Marc by Sofia (2025)
- BTS: The Return (2026)
- Untitled Julie Andrews documentary (2027)
- Untitled Gilmore Girls documentary (TBA)

==== Maxine Productions ====
- Dr. Death: Cutthroat Conman (2023)
- June (2024)
- South Korea's Adoption Reckoning (2024)
- Married to El Chapo: Emma Coronel Speaks (2025)

==== Trilogy Films ====
- Vernon Jordan: Make It Plain (2020)
- Rise Again: Tulsa and the Red Summer (2021)

=== Sony Pictures Television – Kids ===
- Hilda and the Mountain King (2021) (co-production with Mercury Filmworks and Nobrow Press)

=== Sony Wonder Television ===
- Mama, Do You Love Me? (1999)
- Little Witch (1999)
- Timothy Tweedle the First Christmas Elf (2000)
