= America Says =

American television game show

- Genre: Game show
- Based on: a format by Keller/Noll
- Directed by: Hal Grant
- Presented by: John Michael Higgins
- Announcer: John Cramer
- Country of origin: United States
- Original language: English
- No. of seasons: 6
- No. of episodes: 590

Production
- Executive producers: Tara Long; Mark Herwick; Dave Noll; Cleve Keller; John Quinn (2018); Jeffery Breeder (2018); Michael Canter (2019); Rane Laymance (2021-22); Vin Rubino (2026); John Michael Higgins (2026)
- Running time: 20–22 minutes
- Production companies: Entertainment One Television (2018–2022, 2026); Keller Noll; Game Show Enterprises

Original release
- Network: Game Show Network
- Release: June 18, 2018 – present

America Says is an American television game show hosted by John Michael Higgins and broadcast on Game Show Network since June 18, 2018. The series consists of two teams of four guessing the top answers to fill-in-the-blank survey questions. It is a restructuring of the Audience Match portion of Match Game.

== Gameplay ==
=== Main rounds ===
Two teams of four compete, consisting of friends and family. In each round, one team is given a prompt and seven answers with the first letter of each word being shown (for example, if the prompt is "When I think of Italy, I think of [blank]," an answer could be "L______ T____" for Leaning Tower. The length of the blank is a clue to the length of the answer, though the exact letter count is not shown.

The team has 30 seconds to guess all seven answers correctly. One at a time in turn order, team members offer an answer; if it is correct, the answer is filled out, the team gets 100 points (200 in the second round and 300 in the third round) and the player can guess again. If the answer is incorrect, the next player in line makes a guess. If a player speaks out of turn, the team is penalized 5 seconds on the clock. This process continues, with control going back to the beginning of the line if the fourth team member guesses incorrectly, until the team successfully fills out all seven answers (giving them 1000 bonus points in the first round, 2000 in the second round, and 3000 in the third round), or time expires.

If time expires, the other team may make guesses, one at a time, for 100 points each (200 in the second round and 300 points in the third round). Guesses are untimed, but the stealing round ends once all of the answers are filled out or the team guesses incorrectly. Teams may confer on what answer to give (during COVID-effected seasons, each team member gave one answer).

Synonyms and plurals for a word are acceptable if they fill in the blank: for example, "chefs" and "cook" would be acceptable for "cooks" . As a general rule, other than questions that explicitly deal with synonyms for a given word, the show tries to avoid including two or more synonyms in the answers when they do not fill in the same blanks (for example, "actor" and "thespian" would not be separate answers for most questions unless the question were something like "____ is another word for a performer" (CC: Blank is another word for a performer.).

In the event of a tie after the third round, a tiebreaker is played between the team captains. The first letter of the top answer is shown, and then the question is shown. The first captain to buzz in is given the chance to answer. If the answer given is correct, that captain wins the game for his or her team. If the answer given is incorrect, then the other team wins automatically.

On October 29, 2019, "The Canadians" (Ayumi Iizuka, Doug Morency, David Ivkovic, and Paul 'PK' Kingston) became the first team to complete a perfect game, amassing 10,400 points in three perfect rounds of 1,700 points, 3,400 points, and 5,100 points (plus a 200-point steal although missing 3 additional opportunities for steals), and went on to win the bonus round in 39 seconds.

=== Bonus round ===
In the Bonus Round, the winning team has 60 seconds to correctly identify the top answers to four survey questions. The first question has only the top answer, the second has the top two answers, the third has the top three answers, and the fourth has the top four answers. Once all of the required answers are filled out, the team will move on to the next question. Only the player whose turn it was to guess as indicated by a mini screen showing at them was allowed to guess and all other players had to wait their turn to speak while the player whose actively taking a turn guessing gave an answer. If a player speaks while it's not their turn to answer, it's out of turn and it takes away 5 seconds for each out of turn mistake, making it harder for the team to complete the final challenge for this game show.

Any player on the team may use the Pass button at any time if they get stuck on a question (they can only use the Pass button once up to the third question in the round so they have to be careful about when to use it because some questions are harder than others). This will have the team move on to the next question, but they must return to the skipped question after all the other questions have been completed if time allows. If not, the answers for the skipped question and the question that the team was on at the time that the clock reached zero.

If the team can give all ten correct answers before time runs out, their winnings are increased to $15,000. If they fail to do so, they leave with just the $1,000 from the Main Game.

== Production ==
The series premiered on June 18, 2018. On August 14, 2018, Game Show Network renewed America Says for a 96-episode second season, which premiered on November 26, 2018.

On April 5, 2019, media reports stated that America Says had been renewed for a 160-episode third season, which premiered on July 22, 2019. On June 12, 2019, GSN and Sony Pictures Entertainment announced that the show would be launched in syndication for the 2019-20 television season. Sony elected not to bring the series back to syndication for the 2020-21 television season.

On March 9, 2020, Game Show Network renewed America Says for a 90-episode fourth season, but production was delayed due to the COVID-19 pandemic. The season premiered on May 31, 2021.

On March 14, 2022, Game Show Network renewed America Says for a 130-episode fifth season, which premiered on April 25, 2022.

On March 2, 2026, Game Show Network renewed America Says for a 50-episode sixth season, which premiered on April 13, 2026. John Michael Higgins returned as host and executive producer, although he wasn't an executive producer in the first 5 seasons of the show.

A Spanish version titled Piensa Rápido (Think Fast) began airing on Univision on August 18, 2025. A Celebrity "VIP" edition also began a month later.

== Reception ==
Angela Henderson-Bentley of The Herald-Dispatch praised Higgins' performance as host, writing that he "is just as adept at hosting as he is at providing classic sitcom moments." Higgins was nominated for Outstanding Game Show Host at the 46th Daytime Emmy Awards.

America Says raised Game Show Network's ratings by 26% over its time slot lead-in, and raised its ratings for women aged 25–54 by more than 40%.

== See also ==
- Family Feud (similar in concept)

== International versions ==
The Turkish channel TV8 was the first international broadcaster to launch a local format of the show, called Cevap Ver Türkiye and hosted by Eser Yenenler and Berfu Yenenler.

Country	Name	Presenter(s)	Channel	Broadcast
Turkey	Cevap Ver Türkiye	Eser Yenenler and Berfu Yenenler	TV8	December 30, 2023 – May 26, 2024
United States (Spanish)	Piensa Rápido; Piensa Rápido VIP	Adrián “El Vitor” Uribe	Univision	August 18, 2025 – present
