= Keller Noll =

Keller/Noll
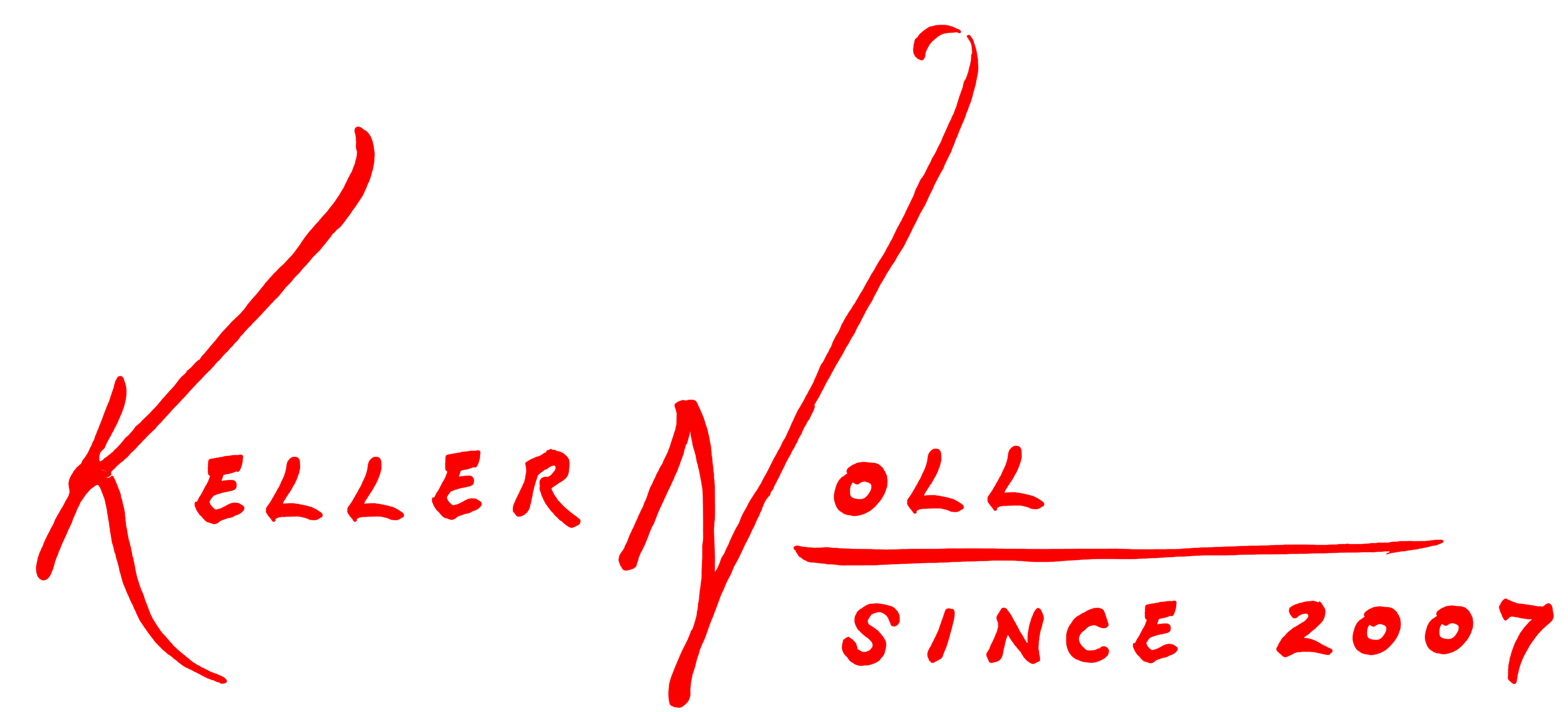
- Industry: Mass media Entertainment
- Founders: Cleve Keller; Dave Noll
- Headquarters: New York City, New York, United States
- Website: kellernoll.com

Cleve Keller and Dave Noll are television show creators, based in New York City. They began working together exclusively in 2007 as Keller/Noll, specializing in game and competition series.

== History ==
Since joining, Keller/Noll have created and/or produced dozens of series including: Food Network's Chopped, Chopped Junior, Chopped Champions, Game Show Network's America Says, AMC's Movies 101 and FilmFakers, BarnesandNoble.com's Book Obsessed, BBC America's No Kitchen Required, Bravo's Rocco's Dinner Party, HGTV's Beat the House, Hammered and Don't Sweat It, Lifetime's Your Mama Don't Dance, Oxygen's 50 Funniest Women Alive, TLC's Cover Shot and Yahoo!'s Ready Set Dance!

Their major franchise, Chopped, originally came from a discussion between Noll and Michael Krupat (who they were working with at the time) about the link between the ESPN series Around the Horn and the syndicated series Elimi-Date. "We realized that both of these very different shows had very similar structures," said Noll. "We started calling them '4-3-2-1 Shows' and immediately with Cleve we created four or five different formats based on that same structure. In the next couple of months, we sold one to MTV, one to Court TV, and one to Food Network. The Food Network show was, of course, Chopped."

In 2010, while working for Barry Diller, Diller insisted Cleve and Dave stop creating "just any type of show" and instead focus solely on television formats with global potential. Since then, Keller/Noll has focused exclusively on creating and producing game shows, competition formats, and reality formats.

Keller/Noll series have been produced in Canada, France, Germany, Japan, Spain, South Africa, Turkey, and the United States. In 2012, Chopped won the James Beard Award for Best Television Series and was inducted into the Culinary Hall of Fame.

In 2021, Keller/Noll had signed a first-look deal with Boat Rocker.

== Productions ==
=== Television series ===
Title	Year(s)	Network
Cinematherapy	2001–11	We TV
Forecast Earth	2003–08	The Weather Channel
NOPI Tunervision	2004–07	Speed
FilmFakers	2004	AMC
Party Girl	2005–06	Discovery Home
Insider Training	2005–06	Discovery Health
She House	2005	We TV
Movies 101	2005–07	AMC
Inner Chef with Marcus Samuelsson	2005–07	Discovery Home
3 Men and a Chick Flick	2006–10	We TV
Cover Shot	2006–07	TLC
Hammered	2006–07	HGTV
10 Things You Must Know	2006–07	DIY
Don't Sweat It	2006–11	HGTV
It's All Geek to Me	2007	Science Channel
Fast Money MBA Challenge	2007	CNBC
Mind Your Manners	2007	TLC
Celebrity Says!	2008	TV Guide Network
Your Mama Don't Dance	2008	Lifetime
Model Latina	2008–12	NuvoTV
Forbes Luxe 11	2008–10	Travel
Chopped	2009–present	Food Network
FANdemonium	2009	Si TV
Wingman	2009	Fine Living
Closet Cases	2009	Fine Living
Master of the Mix	2010–13	Centric/VH1
Deathwish Movers	2011	Travel
Rocco's Dinner Party	2011	Bravo
No Kitchen Required	2012	BBC America
Beat the House	2014	HGTV
Chopped Canada	2014–15	Food Network Canada
Chopped South Africa	2014	DSTV South Africa
Chopped Junior	2015–19	Food Network
Winsanity	2016–18	GSN
Punchline	2017–19	Syndication
America Says	2018–22; 2026	Game Show Network
Face the Truth	2018–19	Syndication

=== Television specials ===
Title	Year(s)	Network
The Suite with Dave Karger	2005	AMC
12 Ways of Merrymaking	2005	Fine Living
25 Biggest Decorating Mistakes	2006	HGTV
50 Funniest Women Alive	2007	Oxygen
25 Mind Blowing Escapes	2007	Travel
The Ultimate Color Guide	2008	HGTV
Top 20 Travel Tips	2008	Fine Living
25 Biggest Landscaping Mistakes	2008	HGTV
Top 20 New Parent Tricks	2008	Fine Living
NewNowNext Awards	2008–13	Logo TV
Relative Madness	2008	SoapNet
25 Great Holiday Ideas	2008	HGTV

=== Digital series ===
Title	Year(s)	Website
Walking with Johnny	2006	VOD
Heavy News	2006–07	Heavy.com
Book Obsessed	2008	Barnes & Noble
Ready, Set, Dance!	2010	Yahoo!
Quizzicle	2016	YouTube
