= Grand Slam (British game show) =

TV series

Grand Slam is a television quiz show first created for Britain's Channel 4 in 2003. In its first and only series in the UK, the main host was Carol Vorderman. She was joined in the studio by analyst James Richardson. The off-camera "Questioner" was Nicholas Rowe.

The contestants taking part, all of them previous quiz show winners, were: Dee Voce, Geoff Owen, Olav Bjortomt, David Edwards, Mark Labbett, Clive Spate, Melanie Beaumont, Peter Lee, Gavin Fuller, David Stainer, Graham Nash, Michael Penrice, Michelle Hogan, Laura Richardson, Said Khan, and Duncan Bickley (who lost £218,000 on an episode of Who Wants to Be a Millionaire? in 2000). Each contestant paid £1000 to enter, which made up part of the prize fund (hence the title, which has a double meaning referring both to the sporting concept of a "grand slam" and to the entrance fee). The winner was Clive Spate.

== Format ==
The structure of the series is a single-elimination tournament, with two contestants competing in each programme. In the first round of the tournament, each heat consisted of five rounds: General Knowledge, Numbers and Logic, Contemporary Knowledge, Words and Letters and then the final round. In subsequent rounds, a Keyword round was added in between the Numbers and Logic and Contemporary Knowledge rounds, with questions having a given word (the keyword) as the common theme.

In each round, each player has a minute to answer his/her questions. The players take turns to answer a question; at any time, only the clock of the person whose turn it is counts down. The question must be answered correctly in order to pass the turn, otherwise the same contestant gets another question. The round ends when one player's clock reaches zero; the other player's remaining time is carried forward to the final round.

The final round uses questions from all of the categories. Initially, both contestants are given 30 seconds. The total time accumulated from the first 3 rounds is then added to this 30 seconds to determine the amount of time on each contestants' clock. Whoever has time left at the end of the final round wins the match.

Each contestant also has three switches to use over the course of the programme, i.e. opportunities to pass the turn (and the current question) to his/her opponent. Switches can be used consecutively to pass the question back and forth between opponents.

== Tournament bracket ==
The listed score is the number of seconds the winner had remaining at the end of the match.

First round
Melanie Beaumont	2:51.18
Peter Lee
Gavin Fuller	41.35
David Stainer
Duncan Bickley
Said Khan	2:09.60
Michael Penrice	46.93
Michelle Hogan
David Edwards
Olav Bjortomt	1:47.31
Mark Labbett
Clive Spate	1:06.08
Dee Voce	1:43.05
Geoff Owen
Graham Nash	1:42.11
Laura Richardson

Quarterfinals
Melanie Beaumont
Gavin Fuller	55.54
Said Khan
Michael Penrice	44.55
Olav Bjortomt
Clive Spate	47.06
Dee Voce
Graham Nash

Semi-finals
Gavin Fuller	2:22.21
Michael Penrice
Clive Spate	1:43.67
Dee Voce

Final
Gavin Fuller
Clive Spate	57.79

== Results ==
Games are listed in the order in which they aired.

=== First round ===
Contestant	Round 1	Round 2	Round 3	Round 4	Round 5		
Contestant	Round 1	Round 2	Round 3	Round 4	Start	End	Used
Dee Voce	26.54		25.93	47.29	2:09.76	1:43.05	26.71
Geoff Owen		35.73			1:05.73	0.00	1:05.73

Contestant	Round 1	Round 2	Round 3	Round 4	Round 5		
Contestant	Round 1	Round 2	Round 3	Round 4	Start	End	Used
David Edwards					30.00	0.00	30.00
Olav Bjortomt	3.01	24.48	42.84	24.00	2:04.33	1:47.31	17.02

Contestant	Round 1	Round 2	Round 3	Round 4	Round 5		
Contestant	Round 1	Round 2	Round 3	Round 4	Start	End	Used
Mark Labbett					30.00	0	30.00
Clive Spate	5.79	5.81	45.73	13.14	1:40.47	1:06.08	34.39

Contestant	Round 1	Round 2	Round 3	Round 4	Round 5		
Contestant	Round 1	Round 2	Round 3	Round 4	Start	End	Used
Melanie Beaumont	38.80	30.29	50.72	55.65	2:55.46	2:51.18	4.28
Peter Lee					30.00	0.00	30.00

Contestant	Round 1	Round 2	Round 3	Round 4	Round 5		
Contestant	Round 1	Round 2	Round 3	Round 4	Start	End	Used
Gavin Fuller	3.56	6.46	36.58		1:16.60	41.35	35.25
David Stainer				11.85	41.85	0	41.85

Contestant	Round 1	Round 2	Round 3	Round 4	Round 5		
Contestant	Round 1	Round 2	Round 3	Round 4	Start	End	Used
Graham Nash			50.71	31.04	1:51.75	1:42.11	9.64
Laura Richardson	8.65	4.44			43.09	0	43.09

Contestant	Round 1	Round 2	Round 3	Round 4	Round 5		
Contestant	Round 1	Round 2	Round 3	Round 4	Start	End	Used
Duncan Bickley					30.00	0.00	30.00
Said Khan	2.58	35.27	25.83	46.59	2:20.27	2:09.60	10.67

Contestant	Round 1	Round 2	Round 3	Round 4	Round 5		
Contestant	Round 1	Round 2	Round 3	Round 4	Start	End	Used
Michael Penrice	2.14	5.13	27.15		1:04.42	46.93	17.49
Michelle Hogan				30.29	1:00.29	0.00	1:00.29

=== Quarterfinals ===
Starting from the quarterfinals, the Keyword round was added as the third round of the match.

Contestant	Round 1	Round 2	Round 3	Round 4	Round 5	Round 6		
Contestant	Round 1	Round 2	Round 3	Round 4	Round 5	Start	End	Used
Olav Bjortomt	3.48			14.28		47.76	0.00	47.76
Clive Spate		31.89	12.57		20.24	1:34.70	47.06	47.64

The keyword was "brown" for the Keyword round.

Contestant	Round 1	Round 2	Round 3	Round 4	Round 5	Round 6		
Contestant	Round 1	Round 2	Round 3	Round 4	Round 5	Start	End	Used
Michael Penrice	19.03	8.67	20.95	13.58	4.60	1:36.83	1:06.83	30.00
Said Khan						30.00	0.00	30.00

The keyword was "great" for the Keyword round.

Contestant	Round 1	Round 2	Round 3	Round 4	Round 5	Round 6		
Contestant	Round 1	Round 2	Round 3	Round 4	Round 5	Start	End	Used
Melanie Beaumont				1.10		31.10	0.00	31.10
Gavin Fuller	10.12	33.44	1.14		6.33	1:21.03	55.54	25.49

The keyword was "night" for the Keyword round.

Contestant	Round 1	Round 2	Round 3	Round 4	Round 5	Round 6		
Contestant	Round 1	Round 2	Round 3	Round 4	Round 5	Start	End	Used
Dee Voce	-	-	-	-	-		WON	
Graham Nash	-	-	-	-	-			

The outcome for each round in this match is currently unknown.

=== Semi-finals ===
Contestant	Round 1	Round 2	Round 3	Round 4	Round 5	Round 6		
Contestant	Round 1	Round 2	Round 3	Round 4	Round 5	Start	End	Used
Gavin Fuller	17.07	47.03	24.47	0.05	23.59	2:22.21	2:22.21	0.00
Michael Penrice						30.00	0.00	30.00

The keyword was "black" for the Keyword round.

Contestant	Round 1	Round 2	Round 3	Round 4	Round 5	Round 6		
Contestant	Round 1	Round 2	Round 3	Round 4	Round 5	Start	End	Used
Clive Spate	10.10	32.23	10.66	0.27	35.41	1:58.67	1:43.67	15.00
Dee Voce						30.00	0.00	30.00

The keyword for the Keyword round is unknown.

=== Grand Final ===
Contestant	Round 1	Round 2	Round 3	Round 4	Round 5	Round 6		
Contestant	Round 1	Round 2	Round 3	Round 4	Round 5	Start	End	Used
Gavin Fuller			14.48	15.42		59.90	0.00	59.90
Clive Spate	9.13	16.14			32.52	1:27.79	57.79	30.00

The keyword was "grand" for the Keyword round.

== US TV series ==
Grand Slam was produced in the US in 2007 by Michael Davies. The initial series, premiering August 4, 2007 on GSN consists of a 16 player elimination tournament.

As with the British series, the US program is presented as a grand championship of game shows. All 16 contestants selected were noted winners on other game shows. Unlike the British series, however, the contestants did not pay an entry fee; they were instead invited for a $100,000 (US) winner-take-all tournament sponsored by Sony, which produced the show. The studio host for GSN's production is Dennis Miller. The analyst is Amanda Byram. Pat Kiernan is the Questioner. Ken Jennings was the champion for 2007. Ogi Ogas was the runner up.
