= Power of 10 (American game show) =

- Genre: Game show
- Created by: Michael Davies
- Directed by: Mark Gentile
- Presented by: Drew Carey
- Composer: Lewis Flinn
- Country of origin: United States
- Original language: English
- No. of seasons: 1
- No. of episodes: 18

Production
- Executive producers: Michael Davies; Vincent Rubino
- Producer: Erica Walsh
- Production location: Kaufman Astoria Studios
- Animator: D.J. Summitt
- Editors: Jason Williams; Rick Broat; Eric Singer
- Running time: 60 minutes
- Production companies: Embassy Row; Sony Pictures Television

Original release
- Network: CBS
- Release: August 7, 2007 – January 23, 2008

Power of 10 is an international Sony Pictures Television game show format featuring contestants predicting how a cross-section of local people from the host broadcaster's country responded to questions covering a wide variety of topics in polls conducted by the broadcaster and production company.

== Broadcast history ==
The American version ran from August 7, 2007, to January 23, 2008, originally as a summer series and later as a replacement program on CBS, hosted by Drew Carey. It aired twice weekly during the late summer and early fall. Each game featured contestants predicting how a cross-section of Americans responded to questions covering a wide variety of topics in polls conducted by CBS. The top prize was an annuitized $10,000,000.

The series was produced by Embassy Row Productions in association with Sony Pictures Television and was taped at Kaufman Astoria Studios in New York City.

On September 10, 2007, CBS ordered six additional episodes of the show slated for mid-season to extend the first season to 18 episodes. The summer finale aired on September 23, 2007, due to Kid Nation airing the following Wednesday.

The show returned on January 2, 2008, airing on Wednesday nights, competing with the most-watched show in the United States at the time, Fox's American Idol. However, on January 24, 2008, it was reported that CBS removed the show from the schedule after four episodes due to low ratings, with a possible return in the summer. This summer run never materialized, and by April 30, 2008, the show had been canceled in favor of The Price Is Right $1,000,000 Spectacular, also hosted by Carey. Power of 10 was not included in CBS's 2008–09 schedule on May 13, 2008, confirming its cancellation.

GSN picked up the rights to Power of 10 episodes in March 2011. The episodes began to air weekdays at 5:00 p.m. ET in order to promote Drew Carey's upcoming Improv series, which did not show much success. Power of 10 was eventually moved to weekends, and was replaced by Deal or No Deal in March 2012.

== Rules and gameplay ==
Two contestants attempt to predict the results of polls in a best-of-five elimination round. A question is read (e.g., "What percentage of Americans said they are afraid of circus clowns?") and the two contestants are given ten seconds to lock in their guess using a dial to select a percentage. If a contestant has not locked in their guess after ten seconds, the computer locks in the percentage on which the contestant's dial rests. Players can not see each other's percentages while moving the dial to prevent influence or copying. The player who comes closest to the actual percentage earns a point. The first player to earn three points advances to the money round to play for the top prize.

In the money round, the contestant is given similar questions and specifies a range of values on a scale from 0% to 100% that they believe includes each correct answer. The size of the range decreases with each question as cash awards increase:

Question #	Question Value	Percentage Range/Margin of Error
1	$1,000	40%
2	$10,000	30%
3	$100,000	20%
4	$1,000,000	10%
4	$10,000,000	"Exact 1% within 10%" (see below)

For the first three questions, the correct answer to the question is revealed once the contestant locks in an answer by pulling down a handle or lever. For the $1,000,000 question, the correct answer is only revealed if the actual percentage is outside of the contestant's range. If the contestant correctly answers the $1,000,000 question, they are then given the chance to win $10,000,000 by picking the exact percentage (rounded to the nearest percent) out of that 10% range.

Missing a question ends the game. Contestants who miss either the $1,000 or $10,000 question leave empty-handed. From the $100,000 question onward, missing a question decreases the contestant's winnings "by the power of 10", meaning that he/she leaves with 10% of the money accumulated to that point.

For each question, audience members make exact-percentage guesses in order to show the contestant a full sample of the results for help in answering. Contestants can also ask an in-studio relative or friend to give an opinion before locking in an answer; contestants can also adjust their choice, if necessary, to elicit reactions from the audience or their friend/relative. Contestants can stop the game and take the money that they currently have at any time before locking in an answer.

Unlike most other game shows, the host is not made aware of the correct answers ahead of time, so Carey may help contestants think through questions and offer his own opinions about possible answers.

== Notable American contestants ==
Jamie Sadler, a 19-year-old Upper Montclair, New Jersey pre-med student at the University of Florida, was the first contestant to earn the right to play for money on the game show and won $1,000,000 (to be paid as a ten-year annuity). This made him the youngest person to ever win $1 million on a quiz show or game show (the second youngest was David Goodman on Who Wants to Be a Millionaire). Sadler accomplished this distinction by giving a range of 23% to 33% for the question, "What percentage of women consider themselves feminists?" Though given the chance to win the $10,000,000 grand prize, he declined to lock in a guess for the exact percentage within that range. Instead, he quit the game and kept his $1 million prize. Subsequently, with no risk involved, he informally guessed 24%. The correct answer was 29%. This marks the first time CBS has ever awarded a $1 million prize on a studio game show (as opposed to the network's reality game shows like Survivor and The Amazing Race), and marks the first time an American game show has given away a million dollars to the very first contestant on its first episode (this record would be broken nine years later when a married couple won $1,300,010 on the first episode of The Wall). On the show, Carey claimed that neither he nor the show's producers believed anyone would reach the $1,000,000 question so early in the show's run. As a result, Carey claimed that they were unprepared for its actual occurrence, but that he would "wing it".

Big Brother 8 contestants Daniele Donato and Amber Siyavus won the opportunity to appear on the show following a Power of Veto Challenge on Big Brother. The pair were taken out of the house to compete and returned to the house following filming. Amber won in the opening round and made it to the $100,000 question but answered incorrectly and left with $1,000.

Contestant Matt Hoffman, who later went on compete on Big Brother 12, didn't make it past the first round.

On the episode that aired on January 2, 2008, two contestants made it to the money round and each won nothing in the same episode for the first time.

== International versions ==
Country	Title	Host	Network	Highest prize	Prize in US$	First aired
(Arab League) Arab World	القوة العاشرة; El Kuwa El Ashira	George Kurdahi	MBC 1	SR 10,000,000	US$2,664,346	October 14, 2008 – July 21, 2009
Armenia	10-Ի ՈՒԺԸ; Tasi Uje	Aram MP3	Shant TV	դր.10,000,000	US$27,700	2008
Australia	Power of 10	Steven Jacobs	Nine Network	A$1,000,000	US$828,593	March 31, 2008 – April 7, 2008
Brazil	Jogo dos 10 (aired as a segment of Domingão do Faustão)	Fausto Silva	Rede Globo	R$500,000	US$291,886	May 2008
Bulgaria	Всичко по 10; Vsichko po Deset	Ivo Andreev	NOVA	500,000лв.	US$349,000	2008
Chile	El Poder del 10	Julián Elfenbein	Chilevisión	CL$100,000,000	US$183,000	April 22, 2008
Colombia	El Poder del 10	Diego Trujillo	RCN TV	CO$1,000,000,000	US$474,441	February 4, 2008
China	十倍钱进; Shi Bei Qian Jin	He Haopeng	Guangdong TV	CN¥1,000,000	US$146,000	March 1, 2009 – September 6, 2009
Denmark	Gi' mig 5	Hans Pillgard	TV 2	Kr 5,000,000	US$900,000	2008
Finland	Power of 10	Janne Kataja	MTV3	€100,000	US$140,000	January 2, 2009 – March 6, 2009
France	Jouez pour 5 fois plus	Jean-Pierre Foucault	TF1	€1,000,000	US$1,459,204	February 17, 2008 – April 13, 2008
Germany	Power of 10	Dirk Bach	VOX	€1,000,000	US$1,459,204	April 21, 2008 – May 13, 2008
Greece	Power of 10	Konstantinos Markoulakis	Mega Channel	€1,000,000	US$1,459,204	October 8, 2008 – July 11, 2009
India	10 Ka Dum	Salman Khan	Sony TV	Rs. 100,000,000	US$2,151,463	June 6, 2008 – September 9, 2018
Israel	תוצאות האמת; Totsot Ha-Emet	Guri Alfi	Channel 2 (Reshet)	₪10,000,000	US$2,905,700	January 2008
Mexico	El Poder del 10	Omar Germenos	Azteca 13	MX$1,000,000	US$75,600	May 11, 2008
Norway	Power of 10	Hallvard Flatland	TVNorge	10,000,000 kr	US$1,560,000	August 31, 2008
Philippines	Power of 10	Janno Gibbs	GMA Network	₱10,000,000	US$208,000	May 10, 2009 – December 27, 2009
Poland	Strzał w 10	Cezary Pazura	Polsat	PLN 1,000,000	US$434,775	March 29, 2008 – January 25, 2009
Russia	Магия Десяти; Magiya desyati	Vera Brezhneva	Perviy Kanal	₽10,000,000	US$399,016	January 7, 2008 – August 31, 2008
Spain	Energía de 10 (pilot)	?	Antena 3	€10,000,000	US$10,914,000	2008 (pilot not picked up)
South Africa	Power of 10	Mark Pilgrim	M-Net	R10,000,000	US$1,230,203	August 2008
Sweden	Power of 10	Mikael Tornving	Kanal 5	1,000,000kr	US$146,466	Spring 2008
Ukraine	100% Україна; 100% Ukraïna	Hanna Bezulyk	1+1	₴1,000,000	US$131,000	September 5, 2008 – November 1, 2008
Venezuela	El poder de Ganar	Leonardo Villalobos	Venevisión	Bs.F 400,000	US$186,000	September 18, 2008
Vietnam	Quyền năng số 10	Minh Béo; Anh Quân	HTV7	100,000,000₫	US$5,555	May 19, 2008 – March 1, 2010

== Awards and nominations ==
Power of 10 won the Best Game Show prize at the 2008 Rose d'Or ceremony.
