= Power of 10 (Australian game show) =

Television series

- Genre: Game show
- Based on: Power of 10 by Michael Davies
- Presented by: Steven Jacobs
- Country of origin: Australia
- Original language: English
- No. of seasons: 1
- No. of episodes: 8 (6 unaired)

Production
- Running time: 60 minutes (Including commercials)
- Production companies: FremantleMedia Australia; Sony Pictures Television

Original release
- Network: Nine Network
- Release: 31 March – 7 April 2008

Power of 10 is a short-lived Australian game show which is based on the original American version created by Michael Davies. The game featured contestants guessing the correct percentage range of answers to polls which have been taken from surveys, for a chance to win a million dollars.

The Australian version of the show premiered on Monday, 31 March 2008 at 7:30 pm on the Nine Network and was recorded in Melbourne's GTV-9 studios. The show was hosted by Today weatherman Steven Jacobs. This version followed the basic rules of the American version of the show, except with different safe levels, which are $100, $1000, $10,000, $100,000 and $1,000,000. There was no ten million-dollar question as in the U.S. version.

Despite eight episodes being filmed and six episodes never being screened, the network revealed that the game show was "indefinitely shelved" on 8 April 2008 after the second episode only pulled 521,000 people across all five main capital cities, losing the whole Monday Night to Channel Seven.

== History ==
Presenter Steven Jacobs received a call from David Gyngell, Nine Network's chief executive, to give him the opportunity to host Power of 10. Jacobs accepted and the position became his first role during primetime where he was the only host.

== Format ==
Each game consisted of two rounds. The first round featured two contestants, who tried to guess the percentages of people that said "yes" to one of various questions in a national poll. The person who guessed closest to the actual percentage earned a point. The first player to win three points in this round proceeded to the next, while the other player left the game with nothing. In the second round, the contestant had the chance to win one million Australian dollars. Contestants were asked five questions similar to those in Round One. In the first four questions, the contestants had to guess a percentage of people answering the survey which fell within a given range centered on the correct answer. The first question allowed a range of 40 percentage points (from 20% below the correct answer to 20% above), the second 30 points (15% below to 15% above), and so on - the fourth question requiring the contestant to guess the correct percentage to within plus or minus 5%. The contestant would win a stake of money for the first question correctly answered; the stake would increase by a factor of ten for each subsequent correct answer. After any question, the contestant could elect to leave the game with his or her current winnings. An incorrect answer would end the game, the contestant leaving with the amount of money they had prior to their last correct answer. The contestant had to answer the fifth question correct to the exact percentage.

For any question except the million dollar question, if a contestant guessed the actual percentage, they won an instant $1000.

== Reception ==
In a negative review, Debi Enkder of The Age wrote that the show "resembles a wonky version of Millionaire featuring supposedly cute questions and ultimately inconsequential responses". She continued, "Today show weather guy Steve Jacobs is a good host: keen, genial, comfortable in the role. It's probably not his fault he has to say 'one million dollars!' so often that you feel like hitting him. It's also not his fault the format is a dud."
