= Studio 7 =

- Genre: Game show
- Directed by: Mark Gentile
- Presented by: Pat Kiernan
- Country of origin: United States
- No. of seasons: 1
- No. of episodes: 8

Production
- Executive producers: Michael Davies; Jen Kelly
- Producer: Tiffany Faigus
- Production location: Manhattan
- Editor: Wyatt Smith
- Running time: 60 minutes (including adverts)
- Production company: Diplomatic Productions

Original release
- Network: The WB
- Release: July 22 – September 2, 2004

"Studio 7" was also the original developmental title for the NBC drama Studio 60 on the Sunset Strip.

Studio 7 is an American game show that premiered on July 22, 2004 on The WB.

Studio 7 was hosted by Pat Kiernan. Each episode featured seven contestants, mostly college-age, who lived together in New York City for the four days prior to the taping. During this time, they were given some of the material on which the show would quiz them. The show was promoted as a hybrid of game shows and reality television such as The Real World.

The WB originally ordered two seasons of Studio 7, with the second season to air immediately after the first. However, the network cancelled plans for a second season during the initial run, due to low ratings.

== Gameplay ==
Each game is divided into six rounds, with a different focus for each round:

1. Trivia questions about events in the 21st century
2. Trivia questions about events in the current year (2004)
3. Trivia questions about events in the 30 days before taping
4. Trivia questions about a specialized subject, for which the contestants had been given study materials ahead of time
5. Reciting items in order from an extensive list
6. Trivia questions about events in the seven days before taping

In rounds 1, 2 and 3, each contestant is called (in a predetermined random order) to a central microphone, where they are asked a question. At the start of the game, each player is given a silver ring to wear around their neck. If a contestant wished to receive help, he or she would sacrifice the ring into "The Pool of the 7" [a circular pool of water with a white "7" marked in the middle, located on the floor in front of the contestants' pods] and asked for assistance from any other contestant left in the game, including those that are on the block (in rounds 1-3). This is where the time the contestants spent together before the game comes into play. A player whose help is requested is not required to give a truthful answer, or any answer at all. For this reason, alliances were often formed to selectively help in-members, and throw off out-members.

Upon giving a correct answer, a contestant returns to his or her pod until the questioning returns to that player. If the answer given is incorrect, the contestant is sent to a bench called "the block." When two players are "on the block", the remaining contestants vote on which of the two players will be removed from the game. The player is eliminated as soon as they have received a majority of the possible votes, even if all of the other players didn't have a chance to vote, at which time the other contestant returns to the game and advances to the next round as normal. However (in round 2 of the first five episodes), if the vote was tied, a sudden death round would be played, in which both players that were on the block were asked alternating questions, with the first player to be sent to the block going first. This would continue until one player gave an incorrect answer, at which point that player was eliminated while the other player advanced to the next round. During this round, the contender may ask for help using the aforementioned ring.

In round 4, when all questions relate to a specific category (such as "The Cheeses of Wisconsin"), the first contestant to give an incorrect answer is automatically removed from the game. This is also the last round in which the silver ring could be used. (In the last three episodes, round 2 also became a single-elimination round.)

In round 5, the remaining three contestants must memorize and recite a list of material (such as the dates, competing teams, and final scores for every Super Bowl game) in a specific order (chronological, reverse chronological, alphabetical, etc.). Two contestants are isolated backstage while the third stands above The Pool of the 7, and attempts to recite the list as completely as they can. He or she continues until an error is made, at which point the next contestant re-enters the studio to recite what they can of the same list. The player who is stopped after reciting the fewest items in the list is eliminated from the game; if two players tied for the fewest items recited, the slower player is eliminated.

In round 6, the higher-scoring player from the previous round chooses whether to go first or second. In turn, each player is asked questions about news events from the past week in rapid-fire format. Each player receives the same questions in the same order. The player who goes first establishes a time for the other player to beat (the round is timed to 1/100 of a second); the clock then runs back down to zero for the other player. The player who answers 7 questions correctly in the fastest time wins the game.

In the series' first seven episodes, the winners received $77,000 while the other players received nothing. In the eighth episode, the seven previous winners returned to play for $777,000 more, resulting in a total of $854,000 for the winner.
