= Crowd Rules =

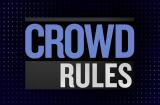
- Genre: Reality television
- Created by: Michael Davies
- Starring: Pat Kiernan; Kendra Scott
- Composer: Nick Foster
- Country of origin: United States
- Original language: English
- No. of seasons: 1
- No. of episodes: 2

Production
- Running time: 60 minutes
- Production company: Embassy Row

Original release
- Network: CNBC (United States)
- Release: May 14 – May 21, 2013

Crowd Rules is an American competition/reality television series, created for and first telecast by the cable channel CNBC for its United States audience. On each episode, three small businesses appeal for the support of a studio audience "crowd" of 100. An audience vote at the end of each program determines which of the companies receives a $50,000 grant to support the growth of its business.

The show was pulled from CNBC's schedule after two episodes were aired, with just 47,000 people watching the debut of the first episode and 42,000 watching the second episode. The network said it has not cancelled the series, but has not yet announced a telecast date for the remaining 6 episodes.

== Description ==
Crowd Rules is hosted by Pat Kiernan and Kendra Scott, who serve as co-hosts and panelists. Each week, they are joined by a different guest expert. Facing the panelists in the Crowd Rules studio are representatives of three small businesses. On behalf of the audience, the panelists challenge the three businesses to describe their operations, successes, failures and future plans. Three times in each episode, electronic devices are used to poll the audience to determine which company is most worthy of the episode's cash prize. The initial vote is a "first impression" vote. The result is revealed quickly to help the viewers understand which way the audience is leaning. Later in the hour, an "elimination" vote determines which one of the three companies is dropped from the competition. Near the end of the hour, a final vote determines which of the two remaining businesses will be awarded the prize.

Series creator Michael Davies said Crowd Rules was conceived to support small business and tap into public enthusiasm for the concept of crowdfunding.

== List of episodes ==
| No. | Title | Guest expert | Businesses | Original release date |
|---|---|---|---|---|
| 1 | "Specialty Foods" | Elizabeth Chambers | Pickle Licious, Mr. Green Tea, Heartbreaking Dawns | 14 May 2013 |
| 2 | "Debt" | Larry Winget | Sky Fitness 24/7, Mystery Brewing, Dirty Girl Disposal | 21 May 2013 |

== See also ==
- Fortune: Million Pound Giveaway
- Bank of Hollywood
