= Juan Zarate =

American attorney & security advisor

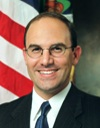

Assistant Secretary of the Treasury for Terrorist Financing
- In office 2004–2005
- President: George W. Bush
- Preceded by: Position created
- Succeeded by: Pat O'Brien

Deputy National Security Advisor for Combatting Terrorism
- In office 2005–2009
- President: George W. Bush

Personal details
- Born: Juan Carlos Zarate Santa Ana, California, U.S.
- Education: Harvard University (AB, JD)

Juan Carlos Zarate is an American attorney and security advisor who served as the deputy national security advisor for combating terrorism during the George W. Bush administration. He is the global co-managing partner and chief strategy officer at K2 Integrity, a risk, compliance, investigations and monitoring firm formed from the merger of the Financial Integrity Network, which he co-founded, and K2 Intelligence. He is also a senior adviser at the Center for Strategic and International Studies.

In his previous role, Zarate worked on the Bush administration's counterterrorism strategy. Zarate is a winner of the Treasury Medal.

== Early life and education ==
The son of a Mexican father and Cuban mother, Zarate was born and raised in Santa Ana, California, and graduated from Mater Dei High School. Zarate graduated in 1997 from Harvard Law School. He studied as a Rotary International Fellow at the Universidad de Salamanca, Spain.

Zarate wrote his thesis on the effects of U.S. foreign policy on democracy in Latin America. In law school, he focused on international law and security issues and wrote his third-year paper on the use of private military contractors in war.

== Career ==
From 1997 Zarate served as a prosecutor in the Department of Justice’s Terrorism and Violent Crime Section, where he worked on the USS Cole investigation.

In August 2001 shortly after George W. Bush came to office, Zarate was offered a position in the Treasury Department to manage the enforcement of international penalties. With the advent of the Department of Homeland Security in 2003, his duties shifted to economic sanctions and asset forfeiture programs, and thus began Treasury’s Office of Terrorism and Financial Intelligence.

Zarate served for a year from 2004 as the Assistant Secretary for Terrorist Financing and Financial Crimes where he led Treasury's domestic and international efforts to disrupt terrorist financing, built comprehensive anti-money laundering systems, and expanded the use of Treasury powers to advance national security interests. He led the U.S. government's global efforts to seize Saddam Hussein's assets, resulting in the return of over $3 billion of Iraqi assets from the U.S. and around the world.

In 2005 Zarate moved from there to become Deputy National Security Advisor for combating terrorism and deputy assistant to the president, positions he held until the expiry of George W. Bush's second term in office. His portfolio included "coordinating the government’s counterterrorism strategy and efforts against other transnational threats, such as maritime security, piracy, hostage-takings, organized crime and gangs."

After Bush's term expired Zarate worked at the Center for Strategic and International Studies and for a time as CBS News' senior national security consultant and analyst. He later co-founded the Financial Integrity Network (FIN), which merged with K2 Intelligence in 2020 to form K2 Integrity. He now serves as the firm's global co-managing partner and chief strategy officer.

In June 2014, he accepted an appointment to the Board that oversees the Vatican's Institute for the Works of Religion, a move announced by Cardinal Pell of the Vatican Finance Ministry as part of Pope Francis I's efforts to clean up the finances of the Vatican.

In June 2015, Zarate became a Class of 1971 Senior Fellow at the West Point Combating Terrorism Center (CTC).

Since 2019, Zarate is the co-managing partner and chief strategy officer at K2 Integrity in Washington DC, following the merger of Financial Integrity Network with K2 Intelligence.

Since January 2024 Zarate has served on the National Endowment for Democracy's board of directors. He is a co-founder of the Foundation for Defense of Democracies's Center on Economic and Financial Power. As of November 2015 Zarate sat on the advisory board for nonprofit America Abroad Media, an organization which ceased operations in 2018.

== Media ==
=== Books ===
Zarate is the author of two books:

- Forging Democracy: A Comparative Study of the Effects of U.S. Foreign Policy on Central American Democratization (University Press of America, 1994)
- Treasury's War: The Unleashing Of A New Era Of Financial Warfare (2014)

=== Miscellaneous ===
- "Confronting Financing of Terrorism in Today’s Middle East" hosted by the Center for American Progress on 28 October 2015
- "Are Belgian Attacks The Result Of Intelligence Failures?" an exchange with David Greene of NPR on 23 March 2016
- "Do sanctions still work as a weapon of war?" an exchange with The Economist on 29 February 2024
