= Sony Music Studios =

American recording studio (1993–2007)

Coordinates: 40.76688°N 73.98905°W

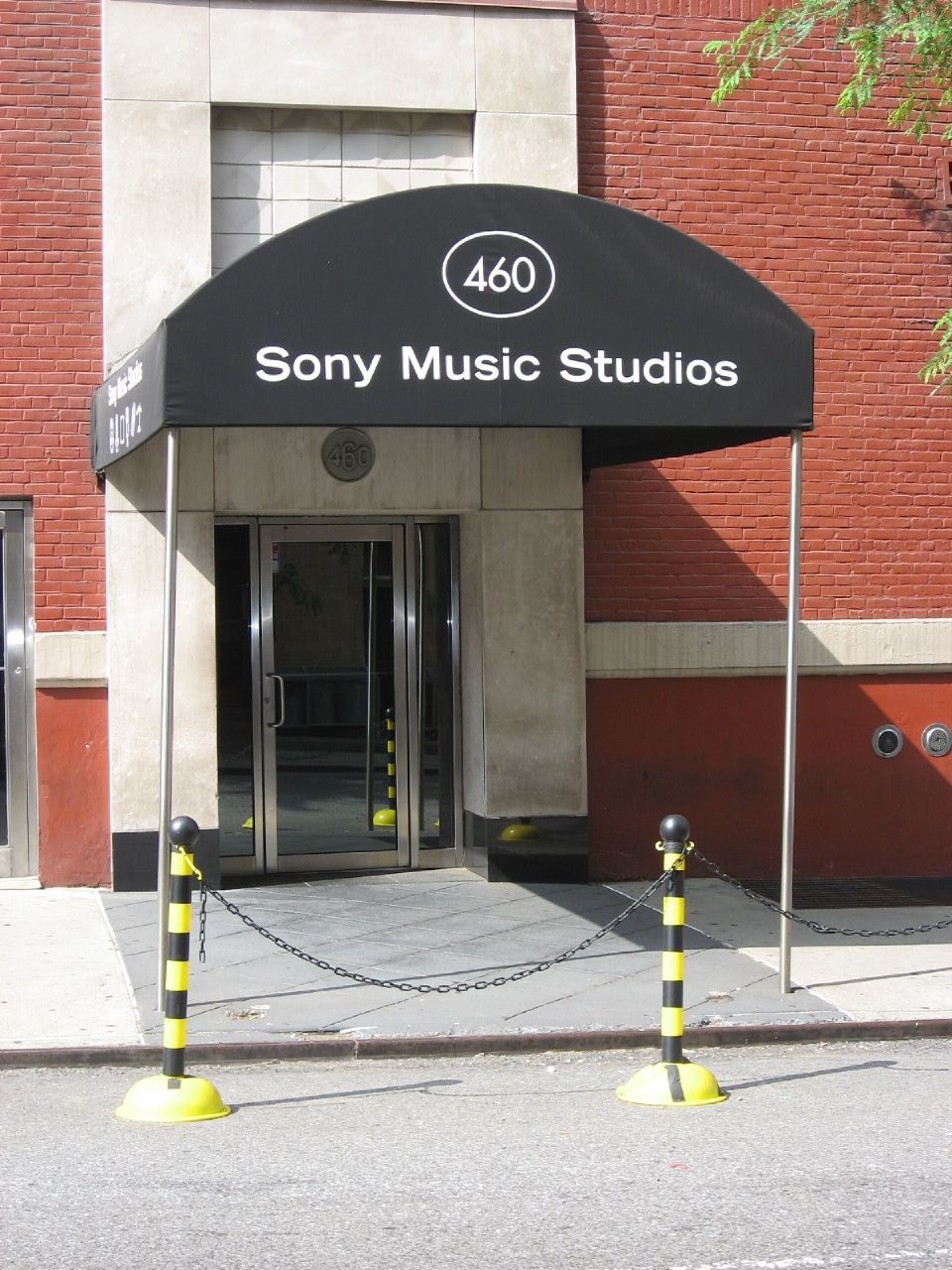
Sony Music Studios

Sony Music Studios was an American music recording and mastering facility in New York City. The five-story building was a music and broadcasting complex located at 460 W. 54th Street, at 10th Avenue, in the Hell's Kitchen neighborhood of Manhattan. It opened in 1993 and closed in August 2007.

In addition to being the production facility for new popular, classical, and other albums, it was also used as space for soundtrack recording and mixing, post-production, and rehearsals. Sony Music Studios also had facilities for live and taped television broadcasts.

Prior to its acquisition by Sony in 1993, the industrial red-brick barn was owned by Camera Mart for 20 years and leased the space to movie and television producers.

== History ==
=== Movietone Studio ===
William Fox, President of the Fox Film Corporation, had worked with inventor Theodore W. Case to develop a method for capturing sound on film eventually becoming the Movietone sound system. In August 1926 the Fox-Case Corporation was created, making $200,000 worth of improvements to what had been the Fox Annex, a warehouse at 460 W. 54th St. (Fox Films New York ran out of the giant building at 850 Tenth Avenue, around the corner. It eventually became DeLuxe, and is now Independence High School).

Fox-Case at first devoted its efforts to developing talking Movietone News newsreels. On April 30, 1927 (six months before Warner Brothers “debuted” the talkies with “The Jazz Singer”), the first talking Fox Movietone subject debuted in New York; it was a sensation. By the end of 1928, Movietone was churning out four talking newsreels a week, and a string of film shorts soon thereafter. The March of Time documentary film series began in rented space on the second floor from 1934–1936.

Fox Movietone newsreels ceased production in 1963, but by then the studio had become popular for film and commercial production. Among the features made there: Miracle on 34th Street (1947), On The Waterfront (1954), Middle of the Night (1959), Fail Safe (1964), The Pawnbroker (1964), The Group (1966), The Owl and The Pussycat (1970), Where's Poppa? (1970), Shaft (1971), and The Exorcist (1973).

Fox leased out the complex to various independent film and television producers such as A.B.T. (“America’s Best Television”) Productions (1949) with such TV series as Inner Sanctum, The Reporter, and I Spy produced at the location. The famous "I Love New York" ad was filmed there in 1978.

Printed records are murky on precisely when Twentieth Century Fox divested itself of the property.

=== Sony ===
In 1968, Manhattan Sound Studios ran a short-lived "Manhattan ‘54" operation there. After this, it appears to have been bought by Camera Mart, who leased shooting space at “Stage One” and “Stage Two” until at least 1980. For one brief year, 1979, Stage One became a major dance and ballet performance space. Camera Mart owned the property until selling it to Sony in 1993. On November 18, 1993, Nirvana recorded their unplugged set at Sony Music Studios in New York City.

The complex hosted the first US version of Who Wants to Be a Millionaire for ABC in 1999 (on a one-day delay), before the current syndicated version and occasional specials moved to ABC-owned studios farther north on the West Side of Manhattan. Other programs recorded or aired live from the Sony Music Studios included MTV Unplugged (including MTV Unplugged in New York, 1993 by Nirvana ), Sessions at West 54th, Tough Crowd with Colin Quinn and VH1’s Hard Rock Live.

Sony Music was also home to the 2006-07 version of the word game Chain Reaction, hosted by Dylan Lane. Millionaire and Chain Reaction were both packaged by Michael Davies.

Sony Music Studios also hosted America: A Tribute to Heroes, a live telethon held 10 days after the September 11, 2001 attacks on the World Trade Center and the Pentagon. The special also featured segments from CBS Television City in Los Angeles. Neither location was disclosed before air time because of security concerns.

On June 7, 2007, after a buyout attempt by Sony Music Executive Vice President/Studio Head Andy Kadison stalled, Sony BMG Music Entertainment announced that it would be closing the studios. Sold in November 2007 for $44 million, the building was razed and replaced by luxury condos.

The last television production housed by the studio was Grand Slam, another Michael Davies and Embassy Row production, hosted by Dennis Miller.

== Artists ==
The company was responsible for the development of many well-known artists such as Michael Jackson, Beyoncé, Alicia Keys, John Legend and other international artists such as CoCo Lee, Romeo Santos and Maluma. Before the recording studio ended in 2007, some classics were recorded there including:

- Shakira - "Hips Don't Lie"
- Destiny's Child - "Lose My Breath"
- Kanye West - "All Falls Down"
- Marc Anthony - "I Need to Know"
- Mariah Carey - "Anytime You Need a Friend"
- Michael Jackson - "Who Is It"
- Jennifer Lopez - "Love Don't Cost a Thing"
- Elton John & Tim Rice - "Aida"
- Britney Spears - "Radar"
- Nirvana - "MTV Unplugged in New York"
