= TrivWorks =

Trivia event company

TrivWorks is a professional trivia event company based in New York City. It is a corporate entertainment and team building company in New York City specializing exclusively in live trivia events.

TrivWorks was founded in 2009 by David Jacobson, a professional event planner and quizmaster whose pub quiz nights in Manhattan and Brooklyn have been included in roundups of the most popular trivia nights in New York City by New York Magazine, Time Out New York and CBS New York In January 2011, Pat Kiernan, longtime NY1 morning news anchor and former host of VH1's "The World Series of Pop Culture", joined TrivWorks as a "Special Host" available for select corporate team building events.
