= My Kind of Town (TV series) =

- Genre: Game show Variety show
- Created by: Michael Davies; David Granger; Will MacDonald
- Written by: Bobby Patton; Niels Bills; Chad Carter
- Directed by: Alan Carter
- Presented by: Johnny Vaughan
- Theme music composer: Adam Schlesinger
- Country of origin: United States
- Original language: English
- No. of seasons: 1
- No. of episodes: 4 (3 unaired)

Production
- Executive producers: Michael Davies; David Granger; Will MacDonald
- Producers: Tiffany Faigus; David Cook
- Editors: Jason Williams; Caroline Buckler
- Running time: 42 minutes
- Production companies: Monkey Kingdom; Embassy Row Productions; Greengrass Productions

Original release
- Network: ABC
- Release: August 14 – September 4, 2005

My Kind of Town is an American television game show that premiered on August 14, 2005 on ABC. Part variety show, part game show, the series brings 200 people from a small town in the United States to New York City to compete for prizes and participate in games and assorted gags. At the end of the show, one of the 200 who was preselected prior to the show competes in a game called "Name Your Neighbors" where, if the person is successful in identifying the names of six people featured in the program, the entire audience wins a prize.

The show was hosted by English television and radio presenter Johnny Vaughan. The show's executive producer was Michael Davies of Who Wants to Be a Millionaire, and the first project of his new production company Embassy Row.

Stuck between mid-summer reruns of Extreme Makeover: Home Edition and Desperate Housewives, the premiere episode receiving a 2.9 rating among 18-49 viewers, with about 11.4 million viewers. By the third episode, the show received a 2.1 rating, with about 5.1 million viewers.

== Episodes ==
No.	Title	Original release date
1	"Greenville, Alabama"	August 14, 2005
2	"Mount Horeb, Wisconsin"	August 21, 2005
3	"Hopedale, Massachusetts"	August 28, 2005
4	"Ellenville, New York"	September 4, 2005

Future towns to have been featured in My Kind of Town included Bordentown, New Jersey, Egg Harbor City, New Jersey and Deep River, Connecticut.
