= Grand Slam (American game show) =

American game show

- Genre: Game Show
- Based on: Format By Monkey
- Directed by: Mark Gentile
- Presented by: Dennis Miller; Amanda Byram
- Narrated by: Pat Kiernan
- Country of origin: United States
- No. of seasons: 1
- No. of episodes: 8

Production
- Executive producers: Michael Davies; David Granger; Will Macdonald
- Producer: Jen Simons
- Production location: Sony Music Studios
- Editor: Anthony Carbone
- Running time: 60 minutes
- Production companies: Monkey Kingdom; Embassy Row; Sony Pictures Television

Original release
- Network: GSN
- Release: August 4 – September 8, 2007

Grand Slam is an American game show based on the British series of the same name. Unlike the British series, which was played as a regular quiz show, the American version was conducted as a super-tournament featuring winners and champions who had appeared on other game shows from the past three decades.

Grand Slam aired on GSN for eight episodes from August 4, 2007 to September 8, 2007. Dennis Miller and Amanda Byram hosted the program and provided commentary between rounds. The questions were asked by Pat Kiernan, who was never seen on camera. The series was produced at Sony Music Studios in New York City by Embassy Row Productions in association with Sony Pictures Television and GSN.

74-game Jeopardy! champion Ken Jennings won the Grand Slam tournament, defeating Who Wants to Be a Millionaire contestant Ogi Ogas in the final round.

== Premise ==
The program featured 16 of the biggest winners in United States game show history in a single-elimination tournament. The contestants were seeded by the amount of money they won on their original show(s). The winner took home the $100,000 Grand Prize and a crystal trophy.

== Gameplay ==
The contestants faced off against each other in a rapid-fire style series of questions. There were four rounds of questioning: General Knowledge, Numbers and Logic, Words and Letters, and "Mixed" (questions from all of the previous categories). Exclusively for the final match, a fifth "Contemporary Knowledge" round was added as round #3, between "Numbers and Logic" and "Words and Letters." In each round, the players were given one minute on their clocks, and the first contestant (determined by coin toss for the first round where the loser goes first, alternates for each subsequent round) was asked a question by the off-camera "Questioner," and his or her clock started counting down. The timing mechanics were similar to those of a chess clock; if a contestant answered correctly, his or her clock stopped, and his opponent's clock started running. If the active contestant answered incorrectly or passed, their clock continued to run and another question was asked.

When one contestant's clock expired, the round ended and whatever time the other player had remaining carried over. At the beginning of the final round, players' carried-over time was added to the one-minute base time. Once a player's clock ran out, the other player was declared the winner and moved on to the next round.

Each contestant was given three "switches" at the beginning of the game, and one more before the fourth round: by saying "switch," a player could stop their own clock and start their opponent's with the current question. Switches could be used consecutively (by saying "switch back") to switch the question back and forth between contestants.

== List of players ==
The players were seeded in the following order:

Contestant	Winner's Info
Brad Rutter	At the time of the premiere, Rutter was the biggest money winner on any American game show, with a total of $3.255 million won on Jeopardy!. Rutter won the 2001 Jeopardy! Tournament of Champions, the 2002 Million Dollar Masters tournament, and the $2 million Jeopardy! Ultimate Tournament of Champions in 2005
Ken Jennings	Legendary Jeopardy! champion, winning more than $2.5 million over 75 games. In his initial run as champion Jennings set a new all-time winnings record. His 74-game winning streak remains a show record
Kevin Olmstead	Contestant on Jeopardy! and on Who Wants to Be a Millionaire?. Olmstead was the biggest winner on Who Wants to Be a Millionaire, taking home a jackpot of $2,180,000. This broke a record set by David Legler and stood until Jennings topped it.
Ed Toutant	Winner of $1,860,000 on Who Wants to Be a Millionaire? in 2001. At the time his win made him the second-biggest winner after Kevin Olmstead
David Legler	Won $1,765,000 on Twenty-One in 2000. Legler's win broke a record set by Curtis Warren, who won $1,410,000 on Greed and over $100,000 combined on Sale of the Century and Win Ben Stein's Money but did not participate in Grand Slam
John Carpenter	First contestant to win $1 million on the American version of Who Wants to Be a Millionaire?, as well as the franchise's first top prize winner, in 1999. Carpenter later won $250,000 during Millionaire's Champions Edition; he donated $125,000 to his charity and kept $125,000. Carpenter was the first contestant to win $1 million in a single appearance on a game show
Rahim Oberholtzer	Won $1,120,000 on Twenty-One in 2000. At the time of his win, Oberholtzer was the first contestant to win over $1 million on a game show
Nancy Christy	First female winner of $1 million on Who Wants to Be a Millionaire?, accomplishing this feat in 2003. She was the most recent Million-Dollar winner at the time of this tournament
Ogi Ogas	Won $500,000 on Who Wants to Be a Millionaire? in 2006, making him the most recent contestant to have faced the Million-Dollar question at the time of this tournament
Phyllis Harris	Won $497,150 during appearances as a contestant on Who Wants to Be a Millionaire?, Super Greed, Wheel of Fortune, Trivia Trap, Scrabble, and Card Sharks
Thom McKee	Won $312,700 during 46 appearances on Tic-Tac-Dough in 1980. His total winnings and win streak set a game show record that went unbroken for nearly twenty years
Frank Spangenberg	Former Jeopardy! record holder for most money won in a five-day period. Was the first contestant to win over $100,000 in regular Jeopardy! play
Leszek Pawlowicz	Won $194,700 during appearances as a contestant on Jeopardy!, Win Ben Stein's Money, and History IQ. Pawlowicz won the 1992 Jeopardy! Tournament of Champions and finished second in the History IQ Tournament Edition in 2001
Michelle Kitt	Won $107,500 on the American version of The Weakest Link in 2001, the most money won by a contestant on that show not including celebrities.
Victor Lee	Won over $80,000 on The World Series of Pop Culture in 2007. Lee's team, the Twistëd Misters, won the $250,000 top prize
Amy Kelly	Won $20,500 on Lingo in 2007. Kelly and her partner split a $41,000 cash prize for making a line with their first draw in Bonus Lingo

== Tournament bracket ==
The listed score is the number of seconds the winner had remaining at the end of the match.

First round
1	Brad Rutter	2:14.09
16	Amy Kelly
8	Nancy Christy
9	Ogi Ogas	1:50.09
4	Ed Toutant
13	Leszek Pawlowicz	50.67
5	David Legler	1:02.86
12	Frank Spangenberg
2	Ken Jennings	36.10
15	Victor Lee
7	Rahim Oberholtzer
10	Phyllis Harris	1:21.42
3	Kevin Olmstead
14	Michelle Kitt	3.34
6	John Carpenter	55.31
11	Thom McKee

Quarterfinals
1	Brad Rutter
9	Ogi Ogas	16.82
13	Leszek Pawlowicz
5	David Legler	44.55
2	Ken Jennings	2:19.77
10	Phyllis Harris
14	Michelle Kitt	9.18
6	John Carpenter

Semi-finals
9	Ogi Ogas	1:37.48
5	David Legler
2	Ken Jennings	2:45.45
14	Michelle Kitt

Final
9	Ogi Ogas
2	Ken Jennings	1:27.67

== Results ==
Games are listed in the order in which they aired.

=== First round ===
Contestant	Round 1	Round 2	Round 3	Round 4		
Contestant	Round 1	Round 2	Round 3	Start	End	Used
2 Ken Jennings		31.62		1:31.62	36.10	55.52
15 Victor Lee	8.70		8.28	1:16.98	0.00	1:16.98

Contestant	Round 1	Round 2	Round 3	Round 4		
Contestant	Round 1	Round 2	Round 3	Start	End	Used
3 Kevin Olmstead	17.98	11.68		1:29.66	0.00	1:29.66
14 Michelle Kitt			18.15	1:18.15	3.34	1:14.81

Contestant	Round 1	Round 2	Round 3	Round 4		
Contestant	Round 1	Round 2	Round 3	Start	End	Used
1 Brad Rutter	46.36	4.43	51.68	2:42.47	2:14.09	28.38
16 Amy Kelly				1:00.00	0.00	1:00.00

Contestant	Round 1	Round 2	Round 3	Round 4		
Contestant	Round 1	Round 2	Round 3	Start	End	Used
4 Ed Toutant				1:00.00	0.00	1:00.00
13 Leszek Pawlowicz	19.06	16.83	25.58	2:01.47	50.67	1:10.80

Contestant	Round 1	Round 2	Round 3	Round 4		
Contestant	Round 1	Round 2	Round 3	Start	End	Used
7 Rahim Oberholtzer				1:00.00	0.00	1:00.00
10 Phyllis Harris	3.55	39.31	10.83	1:53.69	1:21.42	32.27

Contestant	Round 1	Round 2	Round 3	Round 4		
Contestant	Round 1	Round 2	Round 3	Start	End	Used
6 John Carpenter	31.50		55.25	2:26.75	55.31	1:31.44
11 Thom McKee		36.27		1:36.27	0.00	1:36.27

Contestant	Round 1	Round 2	Round 3	Round 4		
Contestant	Round 1	Round 2	Round 3	Start	End	Used
8 Nancy Christy				1:00.00	0.00	1:00.00
9 Ogi Ogas	16.23	39.64	31.03	2:26.90	1:50.09	36.81

Contestant	Round 1	Round 2	Round 3	Round 4		
Contestant	Round 1	Round 2	Round 3	Start	End	Used
5 David Legler	41.38	3.01		1:44.39	1:02.86	41.53
12 Frank Spangenberg			6.25	1:06.25	0.00	1:06.25

=== Quarterfinals ===
Contestant	Round 1	Round 2	Round 3	Round 4		
Contestant	Round 1	Round 2	Round 3	Start	End	Used
1 Brad Rutter	18.63		14.20	1:32.83	0.00	1:32.83
9 Ogi Ogas		39.08		1:39.08	16.82	1:22.26

Contestant	Round 1	Round 2	Round 3	Round 4		
Contestant	Round 1	Round 2	Round 3	Start	End	Used
13 Leszek Pawlowicz	6.94			1:06.94	0.00	1:06.94
5 David Legler		25.38	21.54	1:46.92	44.55	1:02.37

Contestant	Round 1	Round 2	Round 3	Round 4		
Contestant	Round 1	Round 2	Round 3	Start	End	Used
2 Ken Jennings	35.49	32.36	47.88	2:55.73	2:19.77	35.96
10 Phyllis Harris				1:00.00	0.00	1:00.00

Contestant	Round 1	Round 2	Round 3	Round 4		
Contestant	Round 1	Round 2	Round 3	Start	End	Used
6 John Carpenter				1:00.00	0.00	1:00.00
14 Michelle Kitt	15.34	14.65	20.41	1:50.40	9.18	1:41.22

=== Semifinals ===
Contestant	Round 1	Round 2	Round 3	Round 4		
Contestant	Round 1	Round 2	Round 3	Start	End	Used
9 Ogi Ogas	28.83	32.73	23.20	2:24.76	1:37.48	47.28
5 David Legler				1:00.00	0.00	1:00.00

Contestant	Round 1	Round 2	Round 3	Round 4		
Contestant	Round 1	Round 2	Round 3	Start	End	Used
2 Ken Jennings	35.50	27.69	54.09	2:57.28	2:45.45	11.83
14 Michelle Kitt				1:00.00	0.00	1:00.00

=== Finals ===
A fifth round, Contemporary Knowledge, similar to the first round of the British series, was used in the Finals only.

Contestant	Round 1	Round 2	Round 3	Round 4	Round 5		
Contestant	Round 1	Round 2	Round 3	Round 4	Start	End	Used
9 Ogi Ogas	0.14	2.96			1:03.10	0.00	1:03.10
2 Ken Jennings			48.64	9.67	1:58.31	1:27.67	30.64
