= Jules Kroll =

American businessman (born 1941)

- Born: May 18, 1941 (age 85); New York City, U.S.
- Education: Cornell University (B.A.); Georgetown University Law Center (J.D.)
- Occupation: Businessman
- Known for: Founder of Kroll Bond Rating Agency and K2 Intelligence
- Spouse: Lynn Korda
- Children: 4, including Nick Kroll
- Relatives: Roger Bennett (son-in-law)

Jules B. Kroll (born May 18, 1941) is an American businessman who is executive chair and co-founder of K2 Integrity.

In 1972, he established Kroll, Inc.. In 2004, Kroll was sold to Marsh & McLennan Companies for $1.9 billion. In 2009, Kroll founded two successor firms, Kroll Bond Rating Agency (KBRA) and K2 Intelligence.

== Early life and education ==
Jules Kroll was born to a Jewish family on May 18, 1941, in Bayside, Queens, the son of Florence Yondorf and Herman Kroll. Kroll attended Cornell University, where he was a member of Quill and Dagger, and Georgetown University Law Center.

== Career ==
=== Business ===
In 1968, he worked for Robert F. Kennedy's presidential campaign in Queens before becoming an Assistant District Attorney in Manhattan. When his father fell ill, Kroll took a leave of absence to run the family business.

In 1972 he launched J. Kroll Associates, which eventually turned into Kroll, Inc. The business found corruption in companies which used printers with Kroll keeping a percentage of the savings. A deal with Marvel Comics proved so profitable to both sides that Marvel switched to paying a retainer.

=== Expansion ===
The Foreign Corrupt Practices Act of 1977 generated new lines of business in auditing and compliance, so Kroll opened offices in Paris, Moscow, São Paulo, Tokyo, Singapore, and Manila. The firm also provided political risk and executive protection services abroad. Kroll forayed into banking and warehousing and built a reputation for pursuing financial crime across international borders by tracing and recovering assets. Clients included law firms like Skadden, Arps and investment banks like Drexel Burnham Lambert (which hired Kroll in 1982 to perform due diligence on persons and companies that it was underwriting). It first helped Nokia and Motorola find $2.7 billion that had been invested with Turkey's Cem Uzan. It was also hired to recover wealth that had been plundered by dictators, including the Philippines' Ferdinand Marcos and Haiti's Jean-Claude Duvalier. In 1991 the government of Kuwait hired it to trace Saddam Hussein's corporate holdings around the world, including Hachette in France.

=== K2 Intelligence and Kroll Bond Rating Agency ===
In June 2008, Kroll left his company and unsuccessfully tried to buy it back from MMC. In 2010 he launched Kroll Bond Rating Agency and K2 Global Consulting with his son Jeremy Kroll. In 2012, K2 Global became K2 Intelligence. Kroll Bond Rating Agency was started with capital from Jeff Keswin, Michael F. Price, Frederick R. Adler, William L. Mack, and James Robinson III; Bessemer Venture Partners, RRE Ventures, and New Markets Venture Partners also invested $24 million.

K2 Intelligence has offices in New York, London, Madrid, and Bahrain. In 2010, the Conference on Jewish Material Claims Against Germany engaged K2 Global Consulting to investigate the theft of $42.5 million.

== Personal life ==
He is married to Lynn Korda, who was vice chairwoman of the UJA-Federation of New York. They have two sons, Jeremy and actor/comedian Nick Kroll, and two daughters. Vanessa is married to British-American soccer journalist Roger Bennett.
