= 2 Minute Drill (game show) =

- Genre: Game show
- Created by: Michael Davies
- Based on: Mastermind by Bill Wright
- Presented by: Kenny Mayne
- Country of origin: United States
- No. of seasons: 3

Production
- Running time: 30 minutes
- Production company: Diplomatic Productions

Original release
- Network: ESPN
- Release: September 11, 2000 – December 28, 2001

2 Minute Drill is an ESPN game show based on the British quiz show Mastermind. The program aired from September 11, 2000 to December 28, 2001. ESPN Classic aired reruns of the series daily at 11:30 a.m. Eastern.

Kenny Mayne hosted the show, and began each player's turn at the front game by telling them, "Your 2-minute drill begins now!"

== Format ==
=== Round 1 ===
==== Season 1 ====
Three players competed. The show featured a four athlete/celebrity panel. The scoreboard was an eggcrate display. Sometimes it malfunctioned, such as a transition from a number. (e.g. when a player gets a question correct, sometimes a blank digit would show before going to the next number).

For contestants' turns, they would be given two minutes to answer sports trivia questions and would have a choice of four categories, each represented by a member of the panel, each pertaining to that panelist's area of expertise, and each containing five questions. When contestants got a question right in any category, they could continue to play it or pick another category, but an incorrect answer or a pass forced them to pick another category (although they could go back to it at any time, provided questions were left in it). Each correct answer was worth one point, and one bonus point was awarded if the contestant swept a category (got all five right), for a maximum of 24 first-round points.

The lowest scorer at the end of the first round was eliminated. Prior to the show, the contestants are also asked a numerical question (usually pertaining to a stat on a certain panelist) and asked to give an answer. If a tie for low score exists at the end of this round, the answers are compared, and the player whose answer is closest to the correct answer moves on.

==== Seasons 2 and 3 ====
Two players competed as opposed to three. This time, the scoreboard was computerized to match the on-screen graphics, and the current question and answer would be shown to the home viewers who were playing along. To accommodate this, players could no longer interrupt during the question, and must wait for the question to be read completely before answering.

For each turn, again, contestants would be given 2 minutes to answer sports trivia questions from four categories. This time, however, contestants would pick an athlete/celebrity, and they would read all of their questions (in their entirety), regardless of whether or not the contestant missed or passed one along the way. The contestant could only select another celebrity after the current celebrity's questions were completed. In addition, each category had only four questions, but bonuses were still awarded for sweeping a category, 20 points was the maximum possible first-round score.

Because only two players were competing, neither is eliminated at the end of the round.

=== Round 2 ===
In the second round, the contestants faced a series of rapid-fire, general-knowledge, sports trivia questions from the panel for two minutes, with no categories or panelist selections before each question. One at a time (at random), each panelist asked a question. In season one, the panel included host Kenny Mayne, who sat in the center position at the panel desk. When the show made aesthetic changes for season two, Mayne got his own desk and sat to one side of the panel; he thus ceased to be an active part of the front game (as in, he no longer asked any of the questions). Each panelist had 5 questions, making the maximum second-round score 25 (season 1) or 20 (seasons 2 and 3).

The player with the lower score played this round first. Whoever had the highest score after this round won $5,000 in cash and an "ESPN Experience" (a prize such as a trip to the Super Bowl or ESPY Awards), and advanced to the bonus round for a chance to double their money to $10,000. If a tie existed after the end of round two, the tiebreaker rules from the previous round were used.

=== Bonus round ===
The winner would get an untimed question (usually with more than one part) in a category that they chose as their area of expertise (usually a specific sports team of the past or single athlete). In the second and third seasons, Mayne called it the "Question of Great Significance." Answering it correctly doubled what they won in the front game.

Also in the second and third seasons, to heighten the dramatic effect for the question, every light in the studio was turned out except for those focused on Mayne and the contestant, and the panel's table was moved off to the back of the set so the contestant would only be focused on the host.

== Tournament ==
Each player in 2 Minute Drill was part of a tournament. After all the first-round matches were played, the winners plus the highest-scoring nonwinner advanced to the quarterfinals, with $15,000 and another ESPN Experience going to the winner, and a chance to double it to $30,000 in the bonus round. The six winners of the quarterfinals advanced to the semifinals, with another ESPN Experience and $30,000 with a chance to double it to $60,000 given to the winners. The finals involved the two semifinal winners and the contestant who had the highest score among nonwinners (i.e. a wild card). The winner received another ESPN Experience and $50,000, with a final shot to double their earnings to $100,000 in the bonus round, thus making total winnings a possible $200,000 in the event players get all their specialty category questions correct. Regardless of the outcome, the grand champion also received a trophy.

In seasons two and three, the tournament was changed to a two-player game; the rules involving wild cards were eliminated as a result. A second round (awarding $10,000 to each winner, with a chance to double it to $20,000) was added between the $5,000 matches and the quarterfinals, with the ESPN Experiences only being awarded from this round onward; thus, the maximum cash total the Grand Champion could win was raised to $220,000.

As long as a player kept winning matches, he/she could continue to play— meaning that, if a contestant was a good enough player, they could potentially win more than one tournament. In fact, Willy Gibson from Columbus, Ohio, did exactly that; he won the first and second 2 Minute Drill season championships, and was eliminated on a tiebreaker after winning two games during the third season. All in all, he won 9 ESPN Experiences and $220,000 in cash. Nearly all of Gibson's winnings were from match victories, as he tended to struggle with his Questions of Great Significance (Gibson chose individual subjects, Deion Sanders and Eddie George, instead of past teams, thus was given questions with more obscure information). Gibson's second tournament championship aired on September 11, 2001.

The third season premiered on September 18, 2001, in its normal primetime slot, but was moved to late nights later on in the run. The final tournament was won by Syracuse University student and ESPN The Magazine writer Adesina Koiki.

== Reception ==
In a negative review, Hod Smolka of PC Gamer wrote, "In actuality, the game is dull as a doorjamb. The 'hosts' do little more than repetitively make fun of you and your score, and the questions repeat themselves way too frequently (even though the game claims it contains over 2,000 questions). The real fun of trivia is not in knowing the exact answer all the time, but in being asked questions that require some analysis before determin- ing the correct response. The two-minute time limit prevents this from occurring much here. And the repeated crash bugs aren't very helpful, either." Houston Chronicle television critic Anne Reeks compared Who Wants to Be a Millionaire and 2 Minute Drill, writing, "Bottom line on both: 2-Minute Drill wins for content (more and harder questions) and pacing but loses points for functionality".

== Trivia ==
2 Minute Drill creators Michael Davies and Andrew J. Golder developed a U.S. version of Mastermind for ABC which like ESPN is owned by The Walt Disney Company but when ABC passed it over, they created 2 Minute Drill with many similarities to Mastermind.
