= Roger Bennett (journalist) =

British-American broadcaster, filmmaker, author

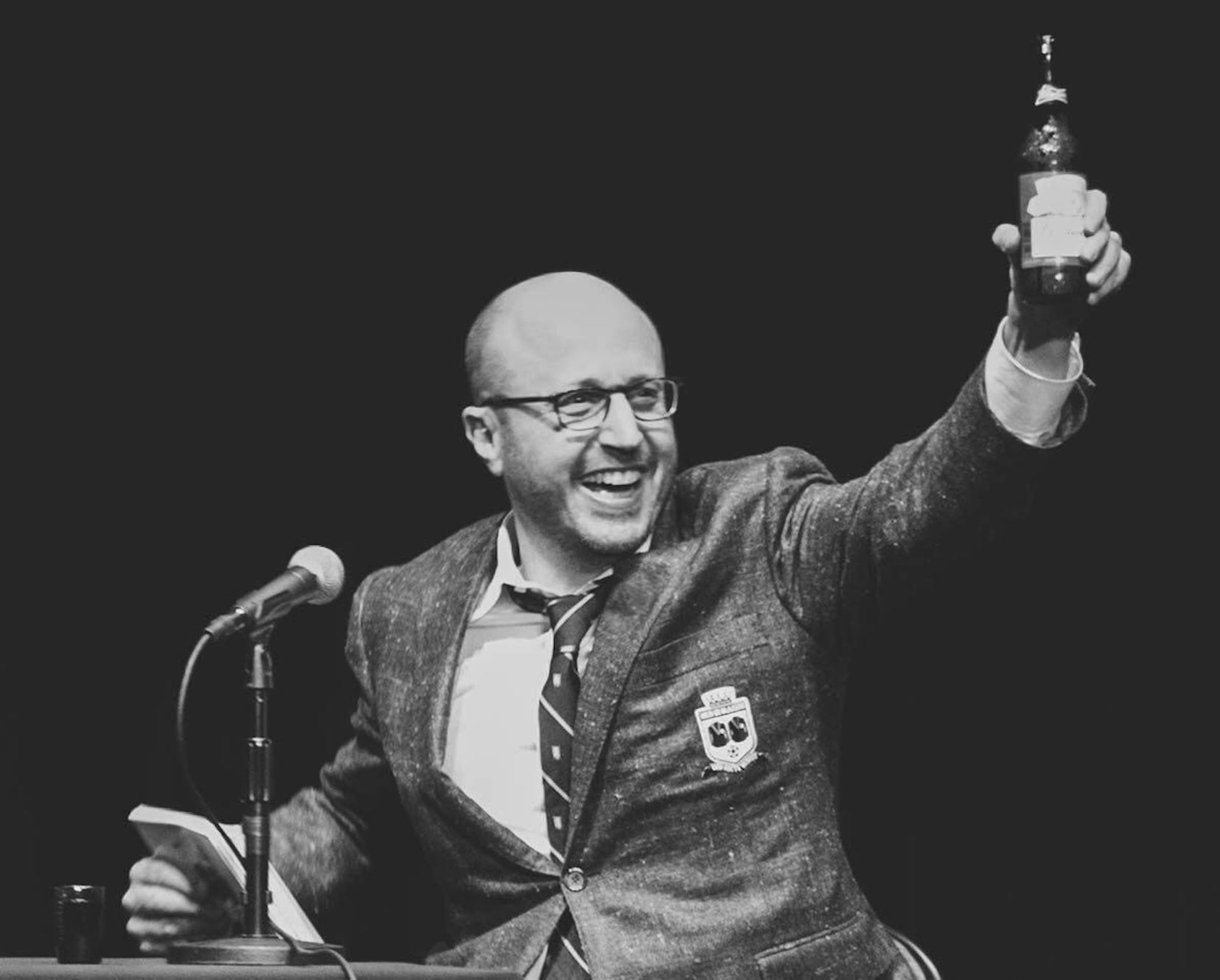
- Bennett in 2022
- Born: Roger James Bennett; 14 September 1970 (age 56); Liverpool, England
- Other name: Rog Bennett
- Citizenship: United States
- Education: Liverpool College
- Occupations: Journalist, author, radio presenter, film maker
- Known for: Men in Blazers
- Spouse: Vanessa Kroll (m. 2000)
- Relatives: Nick Kroll (brother-in-law); Jules Kroll (father-in-law)

Roger James Bennett (born September 14, 1970) is a British-American broadcaster, podcaster, author, filmmaker, and entrepreneur. He is the founder and CEO of the Men in Blazers Media Network and is best known for his coverage of soccer in the United States on the network's flagship Men in Blazers podcast, among others. His memoir, Reborn in the USA: An Englishman's Love Letter to his Chosen Home, debuted at number one on The New York Times Best Seller List in 2021.

== Early life and education ==
Bennett was born on September 14, 1970, in Liverpool, England to a Jewish family. He was educated at Liverpool College and later graduated from University of Leeds School of Law. In 1993, he moved to Chicago on a three-month tourist visa before eventually relocating to New York and making his stay in the United States permanent.

== Career ==
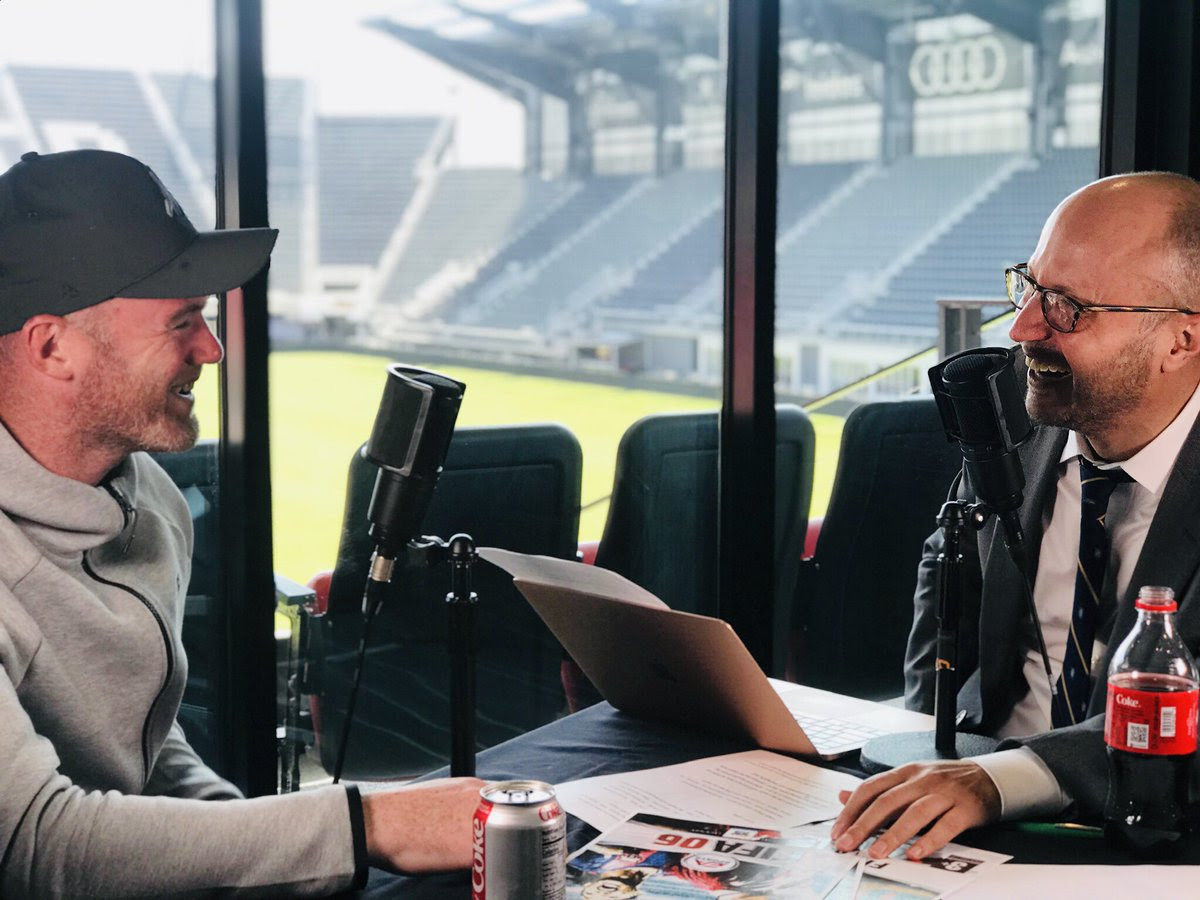
Bennett in 2022.

=== Men in Blazers ===
While attending a wedding on a boat that coincided with the 2006 World Cup Final between France and Italy, Bennett met fellow British expat and television producer, Michael Davies. The two shared a love of football and commiserated in their inability to watch the match during the ceremony. In 2010, they founded the Men in Blazers podcast on the Grantland network, a sports and pop culture website created by sportswriter Bill Simmons. The program combined analysis of the English Premier League with interviews featuring athletes, entertainers, and public figures, such as Rebecca Lowe, Andrew Luck, Noel Gallagher, and Mumford & Sons. Ahead of the 2014 FIFA World Cup in Brazil, ESPN sent Bennett and Davies to cover the tournament, where they produced a nightly recap for the network, expanding the podcast's audience.

Following the World Cup, Bennett and Davies began hosting a weekly television program on NBCSN, and later NBC Sports, focusing primarily on Premier League coverage. The show was recorded in New York City and early episodes featured interviews with players, managers, and cultural figures connected to football, like Mo Salah, Wayne Rooney, Jurgen Klopp, Lewis Hamilton, Carmelo Anthony, Seth Myers, Alexander Ovechkin, John Oliver, Matthew McConaughey, and more.

The brand later expanded beyond its original podcast format and developed into a multi-platform media organization in 2021 called the Men in Blazers Media Network (MiBMN). Producing podcasts, digital video series, newsletters, social media, and live events covering domestic and international football competitions, Bennett extended the network into three distinct channels: Men in Blazers, primarily covering the English Premier League, the UEFA Champions League, and the U.S. Men's National Team (USMNT), The Women's Game, providing coverage of women's soccer, including the U.S. Women's National Team (USWNT) and the National Women's Soccer League (NWSL), and VAMOS, which primarily focuses on soccer in the Americas for a Hispanic-American audience.

=== Podcasting and audio series ===
Beyond Men in Blazers, Bennett has hosted and produced multiple podcasts. In 2018, he co-created American Fiasco, a limited podcast series examining the USMNT at the 1998 FIFA World Cup. The series received critical recognition and was later adapted for television development.

In 2022, Bennett teamed up with co-founder of Crooked Media and co-host of the political podcasts, Pod Save America and Pod Save the World, Tommy Vietor for another critically acclaimed podcast series, World Corrupt, examining the geopolitical corruption behind the 2022 World Cup in Qatar and other major sporting events.

He has also hosted thematic series focused on European club competitions, women's football, and official companion podcasts for HBO's Succession and Band of Brothers.

=== Public speaking and live events ===
Bennett has participated in live touring events with Men in Blazers, recording podcast episodes before live audiences in the United States and internationally. These events have featured interviews with iconic players, coaches, and journalists and have coincided with major international tournaments including the FIFA World Cup and UEFA European Championship.

=== Documentary and television production ===
Bennett directed the 2014 behind-the-scenes documentary Inside: US Soccer’s March to Brazil. He has produced documentary content for NBC Sports, including specials focused on Premier League clubs and managers. These projects have included long-form interviews and historical retrospectives tied to major competitions.

He created the series “In the Shadow of the Kop,” which examined the history and culture of Liverpool F.C., and “The Promoted,” which profiled newly promoted Premier League clubs and their home cities

=== Books ===
Bennett has authored and co-authored several books on sport and pop culture.

In 2005, he co-authored Bar Mitzvah Disco, a collection of photographs from 1980's Bar and Bat Mitzvah celebrations, with comedian Nick Kroll. He later co-authored Everything You Know Is Pong with Eli Horowitz, a book about table tennis and its cultural history.

In June 2021, Bennett published his memoir, Reborn in the USA: An Englishman's Love Letter to his Chosen Home, exploring his immigration experience and relationship with American civic life. The book debuted at number one on The New York Times Best Seller List. In November 2021, it was named one of Amazon's Best Nonfiction Books of the Year.

In 2022, Bennett and Michael Davies published Gods of Soccer: The Pantheon of the 100 Greatest Soccer Players (According to Us), a compilation ranking international footballers released ahead of the 2022 FIFA World Cup.

In 2026, Bennett published We Are the World Cup: A Personal History of the World's Greatest Sporting Event, exploring, through personal memories, what it means for the entire world to come together every four years to celebrate football.

=== Writing and commentary ===
In addition to broadcasting and publishing books, Bennett has written on sport and culture. He has contributed essays and commentary tied to football and American identity. He previously co-authored Men in Blazers Present Encyclopedia Blazertannica with Davies, a reference-style guide to global football.

=== Other sports ===
Empowered by the popularity of the Men In Blazers football coverage, Bennett and Men In Blazers, along with his production partner, Jonathan Williamson, have gone on to create content on NFL, golf, where they cover the British Open and The Presidents Cup, and the NHL.

== Personal life ==
Bennett married Vanessa Kroll in 2000. His brother-in-law is actor and comedian Nick Kroll.

He became a naturalized citizen of the United States on June 1, 2018. Bennett has publicly discussed his decision to pursue American citizenship during coverage of the 2014 FIFA World Cup and in his book, Reborn in the USA.

He supports Everton F.C. and has also expressed support for the Chicago Bears, Chicago White Sox, and Washington Capitals. He has a dog named Martin Scorsese. He is fond of Tracy Chapman and tweed.

== Bibliography ==
- ISBN 978-1400080441 - Bar Mitzvah Disco
- ISBN 978-0307382627 - Camp Camp: Where Fantasy Island Meets Lord of the Flies
- ISBN 978-0307394675 - And You Shall Know Us By the Trail of Our Vinyl
- ISBN 978-0345517920 - The ESPN World Cup Companion
- ISBN 978-0061690518 - Everything you know is pong
- ISBN 978-0761169192 - Unscrolled
- ISBN 9781101875988 - "Encyclopedia Blazertannica: A Suboptimal Guide to Soccer, America's "Sport of the Future" Since 1972"
- ISBN 978-0062958693 - Reborn in the USA: An Englishman's Love Letter to his Chosen Home
