= Embassy Row (production company) =

American media production company

- Type: Subsidiary
- Industry: Television production Digital production
- Predecessor: Diplomatic Productions
- Founded: May 12, 2005; 21 years ago
- Founder: Michael Davies; Tera Banks; Chris Moore
- Headquarters: Manhattan, New York City; Los Angeles, California, United States
- Key people: Michael Davies (president)
- Parent: Sony Pictures Television (2009–present)
- Website: embassyrow.com

Embassy Row is an American television, global-based format, and digital production company based in New York City and a subsidiary of Sony Pictures. It was founded in 2005 by British television producer Michael Davies, entertainment marketer Tera Banks and film producer Chris Moore.

== History ==
=== Diplomatic Productions ===
Davies' first production company, Diplomatic Productions (or just Diplomatic), was founded on December 12, 2000, with the help of ABC and Disney. Davies was originally a senior vice president for Buena Vista Productions, who later joined ABC in February 1998 as executive vice president.

=== Embassy Row ===
On May 12, 2005, Davies joined forces with entertainment marketer Tera Banks and LivePlanet co-founder and former CEO Chris Moore to reorganize Diplomatic as Embassy Row.

In January 2009, Embassy Row was acquired by SPT, the two having signed a partnership deal three years prior in January 2006.

== Titles by Embassy Row ==
=== Diplomatic ===
==== Game shows ====
- 2 Minute Drill (ESPN, 2000–2001)
- Smush (USA Network, 2001–2002) (in association with Greengrass Productions, Jellyvision and USA)
- Pepsi's Play for a Billion (The WB, 2003; ABC, 2004) (in association with PepsiCo Beverages North America)
- Studio 7 (The WB, 2004)
- Stump the Schwab (ESPN, 2004)

=== Embassy Row ===
==== Talk shows ====
- Watch What Happens: Live (Bravo, 2009–present)
- Get Real (Hulu, 2026-present)
- Fat Joe Talks (Starz, 2024)
- Podcats: The Pawdcast (Fubo, 2023–2024)
- Talking Dead (AMC, 2011–2022)
- Doing The Most with Phoebe Robinson (Comedy Central, 2021)
- Prime Rewind: Inside The Boys (Prime Video, 2021)
- Bravo's Chat Room (Bravo, 2020)
- Kal Penn Approves This Message (Freeform, 2020)
- Comedians in Cars Getting Coffee (Netflix, 2012–2019)
- Shark After Dark (Discovery, 2013–2019)
- The Fix (Netflix, 2018)
- Unapologetic with Aisha Tyler (AMC, 2018)
- 13 Reasons Why: Beyond the Reasons (Netflix, 2018)
- Beyond Stranger Things (Netflix, 2017)
- Adam Carolla and Friends Build Stuff Live (Spike, 2017)
- Comedy Knockout (trutv, 2016–2017) (in association with 3 Arts Entertainment)
- The Grace Helbig Show (E!, 2015)
- Bianca (Syndicated, 2015) (co-produced by Lucky Gal Productions)
- Talking Bad (AMC, 2013)
- Fashion Queens (Bravo 2013–2015) (co-produced by True Entertainment and Bravo Originals)
- Crowd Rules (CNBC, 2013)
- The Substitute (2011) (in association with Phear Creative and MTV Production Development)
- Kathy (2012–2013; in association with Sony Pictures Television, Donut Run, and Bravo Originals)
- Make My Day (TV Land 2009) (in association with Monkey Kingdom, Sony Pictures Television, and TV Land Originals)
- My Kind of Town (ABC, 2005) (in association with Monkey Kingdom)

==== Sports ====
- Good Morning Football (NFL Network, 2016–present)
- Prime Video Sports Talk (Prime Video, 2023–2024)
- Men In Blazers (NBC Sports Network, 2014–2020)
- Below the Belt with Brendan Schaub (Showtime, 2018)
- Garbage Time with Katie Nolan (FS1 2015–2017)
- Barstool Van Talk (Pardon My Take presented by Barstool Sports, 2017)
- Fast Cars & Superstars: The Gillette Young Guns Celebrity Race (ABC, 2007)
- The PDC US Open
- The World Series of Darts
- The World Darts Challenge

==== Game shows ====
- Who Wants to Be a Millionaire (ABC, 2020–present) (co-produced by Kimmelot and Valleycrest Productions (2020–21); distributed in India by Sony Pictures Television (2020))
- Tug of Words (GSN, 2021–2023)
- The Pyramid (GSN, 2012) (in association with Sony Pictures Television and GSN Originals)
- The Job (CBS, 2013) (in association with Sony Pictures Television)
- The American Bible Challenge (GSN, 2012–2014) (in association with Sony Pictures Television, Relativity Television, and GSN Originals)
- Hidden Agenda (GSN, 2010) (in association with Kuperman Productions, Keshet Broadcasting, Sony Pictures Television, and GSN)
- The Newlywed Game (GSN, 2009–2013) (in association with Sony Pictures Television and GSN)
- Power of 10 (CBS, 2007–2008) (in association with Sony Pictures Television)
- Grand Slam (GSN, 2007) (in association with Monkey Kingdom, Sony Pictures Television, and GSN)
- The World Series of Pop Culture (VH1, 2006–2007) (in association with VH1)
- Chain Reaction (GSN, 2006–2007) (in association with Sony Pictures Television and GSN)
- Stump the Schwab (ESPN, 2005) (in association with Inward Eye Entertainment)

==== Food and reality competition ====
- Cutthroat Kitchen (Food Network, 2013–2017)
- Recipe for Deception (Bravo, 2016) (in association with Realizer Productions)
- Street Art Throwdown (Oxygen, 2015) (co-produced by Pretty Ugly Productions)
- The Glee Project (Oxygen, 2011–2012)
- Beat Bobby Flay (Food Network, 2013/2014–present) (co-produced by Rock Shrimp Productions)
- Boy Meets Grill (Food Network, 2002)
- In Search of Real Food
- Real Food Cooking School
- South Beach Food Fest

==== Digital and branded entertainment ====
- Reading Rainbow (2025–present)
- American Idol Buzz Session
- Hook Me Up (Yahoo! Tech, 2006–present)
- The 9 (Yahoo!, 2006–2008)
- Poptub (YouTube, 2008–present)
- Talent Show

==== Feature film ====
- Once in a Lifetime: The Extraordinary Story of the New York Cosmos
