= Hollywood Con Queen scam =

Scam perpetrated by Hargobind Punjabi Tahilramani

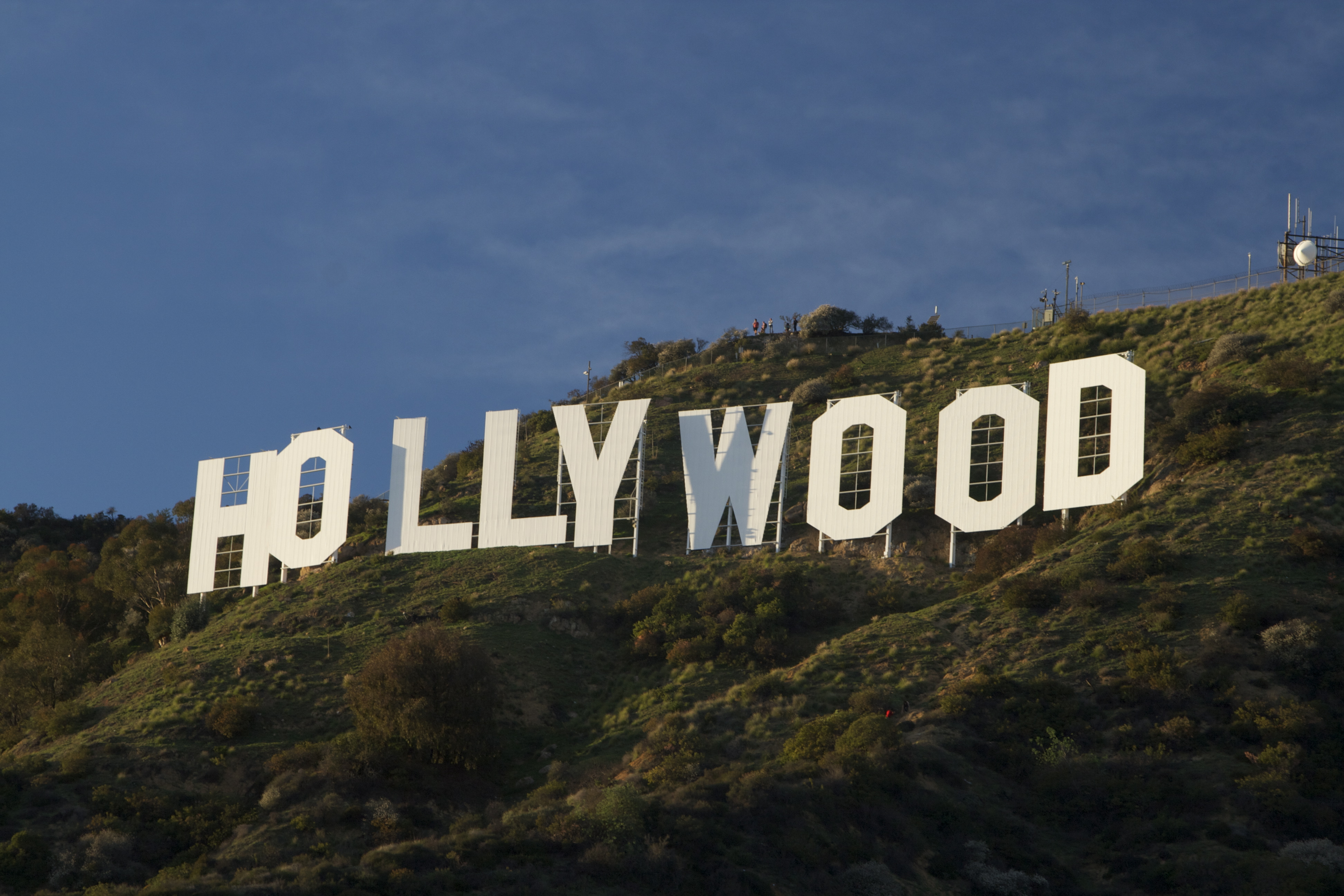
The scam targets gig workers, usually based in Los Angeles.

The "Con Queen" scam is a long-running and elaborate scam perpetrated by the so-called Hollywood Con Queen, an Indonesian impostor named Hargobind Punjabi Tahilramani who was eventually found and arrested. The con, which was successfully operated for several years, targets entertainment industry gig workers, who travel to Indonesia believing that they have been recruited to work on the production of a film or television show.

== Background ==
In the scam, gig workers in the entertainment industry are approached via phone or email by an individual claiming to be an executive, director, casting agent, or producer. The target of the scam is presented with an opportunity to work on a film or television project and is encouraged to travel to Jakarta, Indonesia to scout for locations and participate in meetings. When they arrive, the target is toured around various tourist destinations and cultural sites by a driver who speaks little English. Because of the heavy traffic in Jakarta, the target spends most of their time driving and is frequently told that their schedule has changed and meetings were cancelled. As the target is transported to various locations, they are forced to pay their driver fees with the promise of eventual reimbursement.

The skyline of Jakarta, where targets of the scam travel under the guise of participating in the production of a film.

When targets become upset or frustrated after days of cancelled meetings and driving, they often leave the country early. Throughout the process, the target communicates with the person who invited them to Jakarta, who becomes increasingly irate, demanding, or inappropriate. Targets may not realize they are the target of the scam until returning home and conducting research. On one occasion, Carley Rudd, a freelance photographer, posted a lengthy video on Instagram about her experience with the scam after returning from Indonesia. The video, which circulated widely online, has been credited with connecting targets of the scam. Other photographers such as Henry Wu and Zornitsa Shahanska were caught up in the scam and posted about their experience online.

On several occasions, aspiring actors were encouraged to conduct phone auditions in which they are given little time to prepare for a sex scene performed between them and the producer.

== Perpetrator ==
The perpetrator of the scam is known to impersonate female industry executives, including Amy Pascal, Deborah Snyder, Wendi Deng Murdoch, Kathleen Kennedy, and others. Long believed to be a female, the perpetrator has been identified as Hargobind Punjabi Tahilramani, a male Indonesian national with ties to the United Kingdom. The perpetrator of the scam has also been known to use foreign accents and altered voices, impersonating both male and female film executives from the United States, United Kingdom, and China.

On December 3, 2020, the Federal Bureau of Investigation and United States Department of Justice announced that Tahilramani had been arrested in Manchester. He faces charges of conspiracy to commit wire fraud, two counts of wire fraud and five counts of identity theft. His attorney argued that he should not be extradited to the United States, claiming his “unique characteristics" such as “his homosexuality, his demonstrable femininity, his prior history of abuse which has affected his mental health and his histrionic personality disorder” would put him at an increased risk for suicide or violence in an American prison.

In July 2025, Hargobind Tahilramani lost his court battle against extradition from the UK to the US.

== Investigations and media coverage ==
The "Con Queen" scam has been the subject of media attention and investigations for several years.

The Hollywood Con Queen was originally identified as Gobind Lal Tahil by screenwriter and victim Gregory Mandarano, who obtained a copy of his fake passport from a travel agency after being conned by the Con Queen over a period of six months. He is the only victim on public record to have met the Con Queen in person multiple times.

After Mandarano's con, which had him developing a fake fantasy film by the name of Shadows Below for the China Film Group Corporation, Tahilramani changed the nature of his con and no longer met with his victims in person, restricting all of his communication to personas over the telephone.

The scam became the subject of an investigation by K2 Intelligence when they were hired by impersonated producers, but the identity of the Hollywood Con Queen was initially a mystery. However, once Mandarano provided investigators with the passport and photos of Tahilramani, thanks to an investigation performed by Mike Swick, a former MMA fighter living in Thailand who was another victim of Tahilramani's, the Federal Bureau of Investigation opened an online portal in July 2019 for victims of the scam.

In 2019, filmmakers Jack Owen and Costa Karalis covered the story in a short documentary titled A Colourful Red that went on to premiere at The Emerging Filmmakers Showcase at the Cannes American Pavilion and was shortlisted for a Student BAFTA. The film featured interviews from several victims of the scam including Carley Rudd, Meagan Bourne, and Jord Hammond. Scott Johnson, The Hollywood Reporter lead writer who covered the story for the publication, was also featured as an expert on the case.

In early 2020, Academy Award-winning filmmaker Alex Gibney and former Radiolab executive producer Ellen Horne produced the first podcast about the Con Queen in episode 2, "Chameleon", of their Luminary series Lies We Tell.

In 2020, the scam was investigated in a podcast called Chameleon: Hollywood Con Queen produced by Campside Media and Sony Music and hosted by Josh Dean and Vanessa Grigoriadis.

In November 2020, it was announced that HarperCollins would publish a book about the scam, authored by former Hollywood Reporter writer Scott Johnson, who previously wrote a cover story on the subject in July 2018. Johnson's book The Con Queen of Hollywood: The Hunt for an Evil Genius was published on June 6, 2023.

The April 2, 2021, episode of Nightline was all about the Hollywood Con Queen scam, the Chameleon podcast, and the catching of Tahilramani.

The 2021 HBO Now documentary series Generation Hustle features the Hollywood Con Queen in Episode 1 of the first season.

In 2024, Apple TV+ released a three-part docuseries on the scam from director Chris Smith titled Hollywood Con Queen.

Screenwriter Gregory Mandarano has written a feature film screenplay and TV pilot about the Hollywood Con Queen and is attempting to have the scripts produced.
