= Hollywood Con Queen =

2024 Apple+ docuseries

- Genre: Docu-series
- Based on: The Con Queen of Hollywood: The Hunt for an Evil Genius by Scott Johnson
- Directed by: Chris Smith
- Music by: Nick Chuba
- Country of origin: United States
- Original language: English
- No. of seasons: 1
- No. of episodes: 3

Production
- Executive producers: Ben Anderson; Chris Smith
- Producer: Liam Epstein
- Cinematography: Britton Foster
- Editors: Amanda C. Griffin; Michael Mahaffie
- Running time: 45–61 minutes
- Production company: Library Films

Original release
- Network: Netflix
- Release: May 8, 2024

Hollywood Con Queen is a 2024 Apple+ docuseries by director Chris Smith about the Hollywood Con Queen scam.

== Synopsis ==
The series tells the story of how multiple people in the Hollywood film industry were lured to Indonesia with promises of film work and bilked out of thousands of dollars by a mysterious figure who came to be known as the Hollywood Con Queen. A journalist and a private investigator later learn that the main motive behind the scam is not actually financial gain.

== Production ==
The series was based on the book The Con Queen of Hollywood: The Hunt for an Evil Genius by Scott Johnson, whose articles he had been writing about the con for The Hollywood Reporter since 2018 had prompted "hundreds of victims" to come forward.

In an interview with Addie Morfoot Variety, filmmaker Chris Smith explained, "I wasn't looking to do a con story. I was trying to move into different directions, but then I had a conversation with Scott and he explained to me why this story was different and it convinced me. That led us on this multi-year journey around the globe trying to make sense of this whole thing."

Scott Johnson tracked down the person behind the scam with the aid of private investigator Nicole Kotsianas and was able to interview the subject for the series.

== Episodes ==
No.	Title	Directed by	Original release date
1	"Crazy, Mad, Crazy, Genius"	Chris Smith	May 8, 2024
2	"A Different Animal"	Chris Smith	May 8, 2024
3	"Thank You for the Story"	Chris Smith	May 8, 2024

== Reception ==
The series received generally positive reviews.

In a review for Financial Times, reviewer Dan Einav gave the series a rating of four out of five stars, calling it "compelling" and "an absorbing, unpredictable character study".

In a review for The Daily Beast, reviewer Coleman Spilde wrote, "Hollywood Con Queen is a quick binge that has everything fraud-obsessed viewers could want, as long as one of those things isn't an overarching point. While the show is a blast to watch, it's another instance of a docuseries spinning its wheels, needlessly bloating itself to keep its audience engaged. But even though the ending might leave something to be desired, the show's journey there is compelling, thanks to some novel firsthand documentation and one egocentric enigma behind the whole thing."

In a review for Decider, reviewer Joel Keller wrote, "Hollywood Con Queen is a fascinating look at a scam that was so well-designed that it's hard to find the red flags that you usually see with con artists and their scams. But it’s also an interesting look at just how far people will go to make it in the entertainment industry." At the end of his review, he decided that viewers should "stream it" rather than "skip it".

In a review for The Indian Express, reviewer Rohan Naahar gave the series a rating of four out of five stars, writing, "Apple's thrilling new true crime series tracks down a scam artist who impersonated Hollywood bigwigs and targeted unsuspecting people with a sexual motive."

In a review for The Guardian, reviewer Lucy Mangan gave the series a rating of three out of five stars, calling it "a truly boring journey through an astonishing scam" and noting that the series "would have made for a riveting hour of TV. Instead, it is stretched to 180 backside-numbing minutes".
