= Men in Blazers =

Television show, podcast, digital brand

Men in Blazers Media Network
- Genre: Sports
- Country of origin: United States
- Language: English

Cast and voices
- Hosted by: Roger Bennett and Michael Davies

Publication
- Original release: 2014

Related
- Website: https://www.meninblazers.com/

Men in Blazers (or Men in Blazers Media Network (MiBMN)) is the largest independent association football-focused media company in North America.

Having grown out of a single podcast to a full-scale digital network, MiBMN covers football year-round, often featuring appearances from professional players as well as celebrities. With the goal of “24/7 coverage wherever a ball is being kicked,” MiBMN serves different audiences with three main channels:

- Men in Blazers—with programming focusing on the Premier League, the UEFA Champions League, the United States men's national soccer team, and more
- The Women’s Game—focusing on the United States women's national soccer team and women’s leagues around the world
- VAMOS—covering CONCACAF, CONMEBOL, and more soccer from the Americas for the Hispanic American fanbase

Across all three channels, MiBMN delivers daily programming in the form of podcasts, short and long form video content, social media, newsletters, second-screen watchalongs, live event tours, and New York Times bestselling books. Additionally, the Men in Blazers TV Show—now in its 12th season on NBC and Peacock—airs directly after Premier League matches.

== History ==
The MiBMN grew from the Men in Blazers podcast, which was first broadcast by journalist Roger Bennett and television producer Michael Davies in 2010. The show wove together the American Premier League audience and became a platform for the global game in the United States. The show’s interviewing style made the show a platform for both Premier League stars like Mo Salah, Pep Guardiola, and Bukayo Saka, as well as Hollywood’s and professional sports’ football fans like Matthew McConaughey, Will Ferrell, John Oliver, actress and producer Eva Longoria, actor Jason Sudeikis, singer Ed Sheeran, and NBA MVP Joel Embiid.

The podcast originally launched through Grantland, the sports and pop culture website created by sportswriter Bill Simmons. In June 2014, ESPN sent Bennett and Davies to Brazil to cover the 2014 FIFA World Cup, where they produced a nightly recap for the network, which became a cult hit. In September 2014, one year after NBC purchased the rights to broadcast the English Premier League in the United States, the network offered the team the opportunity to create a weekly program for its NBC Sports Network reviewing the events of that matchweek. It premiered on September 22, 2014 with the mission statement, “Soccer: America’s Sport of the Future since 1972.”

== The Move from Podcast to Media Network ==
As the audience for Men in Blazers grew during the late 2010s, the brand expanded beyond its original podcast format and developed into a multi-platform media organization. In 2021, Bennett formally launched the Men in Blazers Media Network (MiBMN), consolidating its podcasts, television projects, streaming content, social media output, and live events under a single organization.

The network continued expanding with two additional channels outside of Men in Blazers, to include The Women’s Game and VAMOS.

=== The Men in Blazers Channel ===
The Men in Blazers channel includes its flagship show, co-hosted by British journalist and author of MiBMN’s newsletter, The Correspondent, Rory Smith, which recaps the weekend in the English Premier League and other highlights, Big Match Breakdown, which features Bennett and guests breaking down big games immediately after the final whistle blows, and Big Weekend Preview, which looks forward to the big storylines of the next matchweek to come. It also includes larger coverage as well as athlete and sports personalities with European Nights, The Captain, The Deuce, and Switch the Play.

==== European Nights ====
European Nights is a show that is produced around the European leagues (UEFA Champions League, UEFA Europa League, UEFA Conference League) featuring Bennett and Smith, which analyzes trends and key matches along with cultural insight into different cities participating in the matchweek ahead.

==== The Captain ====
In May 2024, USMNT midfielder Tyler Adams joined the network as host of The Captain, a biweekly audio and video series co-hosted with Bennett. The program centers on leadership, Adams’s professional career, and the state of American soccer, drawing on his role as captain of the USMNT.

==== The Deuce ====
In June 2025, the network announced the launch of The Deuce, hosted by legendary former USMNT forward Clint Dempsey. The show marked Dempsey’s entry into MiBMN as a contributor, further expanding the network’s roster of former players and on-air personalities. The Deuce is a series of live shows, match reactions, and podcasts covering all things U.S. Soccer.

==== Switch the Play ====
In August 2025, MiBMN launched Switch the Play with NBA player Larry Nance Jr. and Bennett, where NBA players, coaches, and legends join the show to talk about their love of soccer. Nance’s lifelong obsession with soccer began as a player, something he did from a young age until 16, and has evolved to see himself as a part-owner of Premier League club Leeds United.

=== The Women’s Game Channel ===
In 2024, MiBMN launched The Women’s Game, a dedicated channel focused on women’s soccer. The platform covers the USWNT, the National Women’s Soccer League (NWSL), and major international competitions. The channel is hosted by former USWNT, North Carolina Courage, Manchester City, and Kansas City Current midfielder Sam Mewis, who serves as Editor-in-Chief.

Following its launch, The Women’s Game expanded its programming across podcasts, video content, social media, newsletters, and live events. The channel runs two weekly shows: Friendlies, hosted by Mewis and sees her interview players, coaches, and those involved with women’s soccer around the world, and Good Vibes FC, which is co-hosted by Mewis, former USWNT player and captain Becky Sauerbrunn, and current USWNT and Seattle Reign FC player Lynn Biyendolo. The channel has become a central component of MiBMN coverage of women’s soccer in the United States and internationally.

==== Friendlies ====
A weekly interview show where Sam Mewis sits down for in-depth conversations with stars of women's football including players, coaches, executives, and journalists from around the world.

==== Good Vibes FC ====
A show with Sam Mewis and a combination of Lynn Biyendolo and Becky Sauerbrunn where they recap the week of matches, preview the next week’s games, and talk about the issues and highlights that week in the world of women’s soccer.

==== Teaming Up with Becky Sauerbrunn ====
A show hosted by Becky Sauerbrunn where the former USWNT defender and captain connects with influential figures in soccer, with voices ranging from celebrity owners and coaches to sports psychologists, data analysts, and social activists.

==== Mewis Squared ====
A biweekly show hosted by sisters Sam Mewis and Kristie Mewis, both former USWNT players. The episodes focus on the sisters’ professional careers and shared experiences in international and club soccer, including their participation in the FIFA Women’s World Cup, the Olympic Games, and the NWSL.

=== VAMOS Channel ===
Former USMNT player and soccer analyst Herculez Gomez joined MiBMN in 2023 with the launch of VAMOS, a weekly podcast focused on CONCACAF, CONMEBOL, and the USMNT. In response to audience growth and demand for expanded coverage, MiBMN formally launched VAMOS as a standalone channel in 2025.

The VAMOS channel includes audio and video podcasts as well as continuous social media coverage, operating as MiBMN’s primary Hispanic-forward and Americas-focused soccer channel. Shows include VAMOS and The Give N Go.

==== VAMOS with Herc Gomez ====
VAMOS is a weekly show hosted by Gomez where he interviews players, coaches, and personalities around the North American game, bringing his expert analysis to listeners as he examines the biggest stories in global soccer.

==== The Give N Go ====
In September 2025, as part of the expansion of MiBMN, the network acquired the soccer show The Give N Go with hosts Edward Reynoso and Cristian Soltero, joining the VAMOS channel as contributors. The show features discussion and analysis of soccer in North America and around the globe with multiple weekly episodes through the complex lens and viewpoint of the U.S. Hispanic audience.

=== Other Shows and Properties ===
==== Here We Go with Fabrizio Romano ====
In March 2024, MiBMN added Italian football journalist and broadcaster Fabrizio Romano to the network with the launch of Here We Go, a show named after Romano’s widely recognized catchphrase. The show focuses on global football transfer news and reporting, expanding the network’s international coverage and perspective.

==== This Week in Wrexham ====
In November 2023, MiBMN announced This Week in Wrexham, a show and vlog series that focuses on Wrexham AFC, owned by Ryan Reynolds and Rob McElhenney. The show provides a mix of match analysis, behind-the-scenes stories, and exclusive interviews with players and staff, and takes a closer look at the week-to-week performance of the club.

==== USMNT Only ====
In February 2025, MiBMN acquired USMNT Only, a digital media brand focused exclusively on the U.S. Men’s National Team. USMNT Only built a following through real-time match coverage, news aggregation, and fan-driven commentary across social and digital platforms, concentrating on USMNT players, matches, and tournaments.

== Guests ==
The Men in Blazers television show and podcast have featured a wide range of celebrities, including:

Athletes
Megan Rapinoe, DeAndre Hopkins, Alexander Ovechkin, Wayne Rooney, Alex Morgan, Andrew Luck, J. J. Watt, Carmelo Anthony, Lewis Hamilton, Rory McIlroy, Steve Kerr, Daryl Dike

Musicians
Killer Mike, Diplo, Vampire Weekend, Mumford & Sons, Noel Gallagher, Haim

Actors
Laura Linney, Will Ferrell, Dominic West, Diego Luna, Mike Myers, John Lithgow, Anupam Kher, Rob McElhenney

Cultural
Barry Hearn John Oliver, James Corden, David Simon, Guy Ritchie, Seth Meyers, Hasan Minhaj, Peter Moore

== Live tours ==
The duo have travelled the nation from coast to coast, playing summer live tours which have given them the ability to bring together thousands of American soccer fans to celebrate the World Cup, Women's World Cup, and Euros, along with guests who include Billy Beane, Waka Flocka, and Taylor Lewan.

== The Annual Golden Blazer Award Show ==
In the Encyclopedia Blazertannica, the Men in Blazers also explain that they give out a golden blazer once a year to someone they credit with helping grow soccer, especially in America. So far, the recipients are:

- 2014 — Bob Ley, ESPN soccer and Outside the Lines host
- 2015 — Julie Foudy, U.S. women's national team captain, FIFA Women's World Cup winner, Olympic gold medalist and ESPN soccer commentator and journalist
- 2016 — Loretta Lynch, U.S. Attorney General and key proponent of the 2015 FIFA corruption case that resulted in the resignation of FIFA President Sepp Blatter
- 2017 — Rebecca Lowe, NBC Premier League host
- 2018 — Rob Stone, FOX soccer host
- 2019 — Megan Rapinoe, U.S. women's national team co-captain, FIFA Women's World Cup winner and Olympic gold medalist
- 2020 — Emmanuel Eboue

In 2019, Men in Blazers launched an American Premier League Player of the Year Award, given to America's favorite Premier League player. The award's inaugural recipient was Liverpool's Virgil Van Dijk.
