= Pat Kiernan =

Canadian-American television host

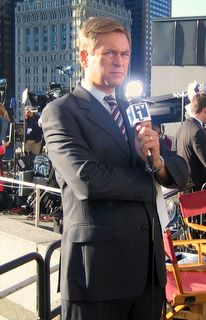
- Kiernan at the World Trade Center site, 2006
- Born: November 20, 1968 (age 58); Calgary, Alberta, Canada
- Occupation: Television host
- Spouse: Dawn Lerohl (m. 1994)
- Children: 2

Patrick Kiernan (born November 20, 1968) is a Canadian-American television host, appearing as the morning news anchor of NY1 since 1997. He is widely known in New York City for his "In the Papers" feature, in which he summarizes the colorful content in New York City's daily newspapers, replete with his deadpan humor. Kiernan has also hosted game shows and appeared in films and on television either as himself or as a reporter.

== Career ==
Kiernan began his news career in 1988 at CKRA-FM in Edmonton while a business student at the University of Alberta. He later made a transition from radio to television at Edmonton's CFRN News. In 1993, he moved to another Edmonton television station, CITV, where he produced the weekday primetime newscast. Kiernan moved to New York City three years later to work for Time Warner, where he soon became the morning anchor of NY1. Kiernan is usually on air from 5 AM until 10 AM, weekdays. He was on air on the morning of the September 11th terrorist attacks, and remained on air for nearly 15 hours that day. Kiernan also serves as a correspondent for Business News Network in Canada. From 2000 to 2004, Kiernan was the co-anchor of the CNNfn program The Money Gang. His co-hosts included Christine Romans and two fellow Canadians, Amanda Lang and Ali Velshi. In 2008, Kiernan created Pat's Papers, a website curation of his favorite stories from newspapers across the United States.

In January 2011, Kiernan joined TrivWorks as a "Special Host" available for select corporate team building events.

In January 2014, Kiernan added an afternoon job to his long-running morning routine, joining WABC (AM) Radio to host a 5 pm weeknight news/talk show recapping the events of the day in and around New York City. He left WABC in early 2015.

Kiernan joined Bloomberg TV Canada in 2015 as the host of the channel's Thursday night Bloomberg North program. The half-hour report reviews the week's global business events from a Canadian perspective.

The routine of his early morning commute to work at NY1 is the subject of Kiernan's first children's book Good Morning, City, published by Farrar, Straus and Giroux in 2016. A starred review in Publishers Weekly explains that "Kiernan knows a lot about how a city shakes off sleep."

Kiernan has appeared in cameos as himself or as a reporter in such films as The Interpreter (2005), Night at the Museum (2006), True North (film) (2006), The Son of No One (2011), Iron Man 3 (2013), and The Amazing Spider-Man 2 (2014). He has been featured in publications including New York magazine ("Morning Star", February 5, 2001), the New York Post ("Dream Job: Pat Kiernan", October 3, 2005), and The New Yorker ("Explainer"; May 21, 2012).

On March 7, 2012, he served as guest co-host with Kelly Ripa on Live! with Kelly. The appearance came nearly a year after a New York Magazine article in which he declared his interest in the soon-to-be-vacant job because it was a "rare intersection" of his knowledge of New York City and his passion for pop culture. The New York Daily News covered the March 7 program with a minute-by-minute live blog.

In 2013, Canada's Report on Business named Kiernan one of the "16 Canadians We Want Back".

== Game shows ==
Kiernan has also hosted several game shows, all produced by Michael Davies: Studio 7, which aired on The WB Television Network in the summer of 2004; two seasons of The World Series of Pop Culture, which began airing on VH1 July 10, 2006, and July 9, 2007, respectively. He served as the off-screen "questioner" of the U.S. version of Grand Slam, which premiered on GSN on August 4, 2007.

In May 2013 Kiernan joined Crowd Rules as one of the two co-hosts on the small business competition series. The ratings for the series fell below expectations and CNBC has yet to air six of the eight episodes initially produced.

== Personal life ==
Kiernan was married to Dawn Lerohl on June 4, 1994. They moved to Manhattan in 1996 and are citizens of both the United States and Canada. They used to reside on the Upper West Side, but in April 2012 Kiernan purchased a $2 million townhouse in the Williamsburg section of Brooklyn. They have two children, Lucy (October 27, 2001) and Maeve (July 12, 2004).

== Filmography ==
All roles are credited as himself, unless otherwise noted.

=== Film ===
Year	Title	Role	Notes
2026	Spider-Man: Brand New Day	Himself	
2021	Spider-Man: No Way Home	Himself	
2019	Spider-Man: Far From Home	Himself	Cameo; mid-credits scene
2018	The Commuter	Himself	
2016	Doctor Strange	Himself	Cameo
2016	Ghostbusters	Himself	Cameo
2016	Money Monster	Himself	Uncredited Cameo
2014	The Amazing Spider-Man 2	NY1 Morning Anchor	
2014	Annie	NY1 Reporter	
2014	Non-Stop	NY1 Anchor	
2014	Jack Ryan: Shadow Recruit	Anchor	
2013	Iron Man 3	Himself	Cameo
2012	The Avengers	Himself	Cameo
2011	4:44 Last Day on Earth	Anchor	
2011	The Son of No One	News Reporter #1	
2006	Night at the Museum	TV News Anchor	
2006	True North	Henri	
2006	Around the World in 90 Seconds	Pat	Short film; writer
2005	The Interpreter	Himself	
2001	Storytelling	TV News Announcer (voice)	Uncredited

=== Television ===
Year	Title	Episode(s)	Role	Notes
2025	Daredevil: Born Again	1 episode	Himself	
2024	Echo	1 episode	Himself	
2021	Hawkeye	2 episodes	Himself	
2021	Gossip Girl	Hope Sinks	NY1 Reporter	
2017	The Punisher	Episode: "Front Toward Enemy"	Himself	
2017	Mr. Robot	1 episode	Himself	
2017	The Defenders	Episode: "The H Word"	Himself	
2016	Odd Mom Out	Hanoi Jill	Himself	
2016	Difficult People	Kessler Epstein Foundation	Himself	
2016	Unbreakable Kimmy Schmidt	Kimmy Finds Her Mom	Himself	
2016	Billions	Boasts and Rails	Himself	
2015-2016	Daredevil	3 episodes	Himself	
2015	The Strain	Intruders	Newscaster	
2015	American Odyssey	Real World	Himself	
2014	Nurse Jackie	S06E03 : "Super Greens"	Himself	
2014	Broad City	Hurricane Wanda		
2013	Crowd Rules	8 episodes		Host
2013	The Daily Show with Jon Stewart	Jehane Noujim		
2013	Golden Boy	Pilot		
2012	30 Rock	What Will Happen to the Gang Next Year?		
2012	Animal Practice	Dr. Yamamazing		
2012	Live with Kelly and Michael	3 episodes		Guest Co-Host
2011	Law & Order: Criminal Intent	Rispetto		
2009	Gameshow and Tell			Documentary
2008	Who Wants to Be a Millionaire	5 episodes		Guest Expert
2007	Grand Slam	8 episodes		The Questioner
2006-2007	World Series of Pop Culture	16 episodes		Host
2007	ShowBusiness: The Road to Broadway			Documentary
2004	Studio 7			Host
2002	People I Know			
2001	Spin City	Chinatown		
