= Clive Spate =

British game show contestant (born 1952)

Clive Spate (born 16 January 1952) is a British game show contestant. He was the winner of the eighth series of Countdown and has won many other TV quizzes, including the 2003 series Grand Slam, a contest between previous quiz show champions which also featured Olav Bjortomt, Mark Labbett, Graham Nash and David Edwards, among others.

He appeared on Who Wants to be a Millionaire? (Series 15, Episode 13), broadcast on 27 March 2004, where he won £125,000.

Spate is also a former tournament Scrabble player. He was the top rated UK player in 1991, 1994 and 1995. He competed at the World Scrabble Championship in 1993, finishing ninth out of sixty-four. The winner that year was Countdown Champion of Champions Mark Nyman – the first UK Scrabble player to hold the World Championship title.

Spate gradually retired from the game, although he made a brief comeback in 2003, when he was the runner-up at the British National Scrabble Championship.
