= American Fiasco =

Sports podcast by WNYC Studios

- Genre: Soccer
- Language: American English

Cast and voices
- Hosted by: Roger Bennett

Production
- Length: 25–35 Minutes

Publication
- No. of seasons: 1
- No. of episodes: 10 and 2 Bonus Episodes
- Original release: June 4 – June 11, 2018
- Provider: WNYC Studios

Related
- Website: www.wnycstudios.org/podcasts/american-fiasco

American Fiasco is a sports podcast hosted by Roger Bennett and produced by WNYC Studios.

== Background ==
The podcast was a twelve-part series hosted by Roger Bennett and produced by WNYC Studios. Bennett grew up in Liverpool, but moved to Chicago in 1993 and became an American citizen during the production of the podcast. The podcast covers the United States men's national soccer team and their defeat at the 1998 FIFA World Cup The team had unsteady leadership from Steve Sampson and the American's were unaccustomed to France—where the world cup was held. The theme music for the podcast was created by Justin Vernon of Bon Iver.
