= Hanna Bezulyk =

Ukrainian journalist

Hanna Bezulyk Ганна Безулик
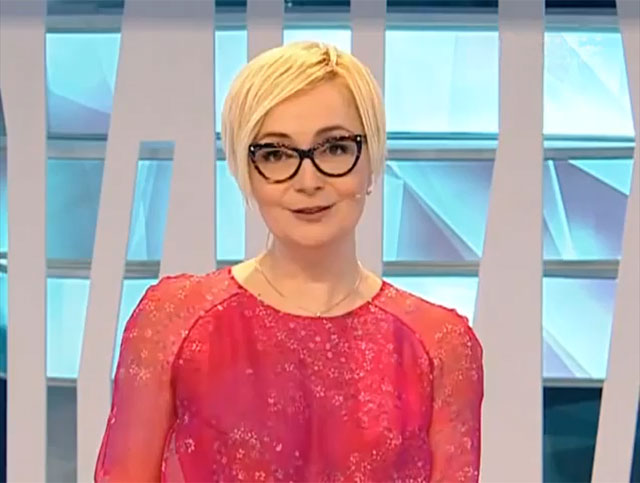
- Born: 13 May 1971 (age 55); Kyiv, Ukrainian SSR, Soviet Union
- Citizenship: Ukrainian
- Education: Taras Shevchenko National University of Kyiv
- Occupation: Television host
- Children: 1
- Awards: Order of Princess Olga, 3rd class

Hanna Volodymyrivna Bezulyk (Ukrainian: Ганна Володимирівна Безулик born 13 May 1971) is a Ukrainian television host.
