= Ogi Ogas =

American neuroscientist (b. 1971)

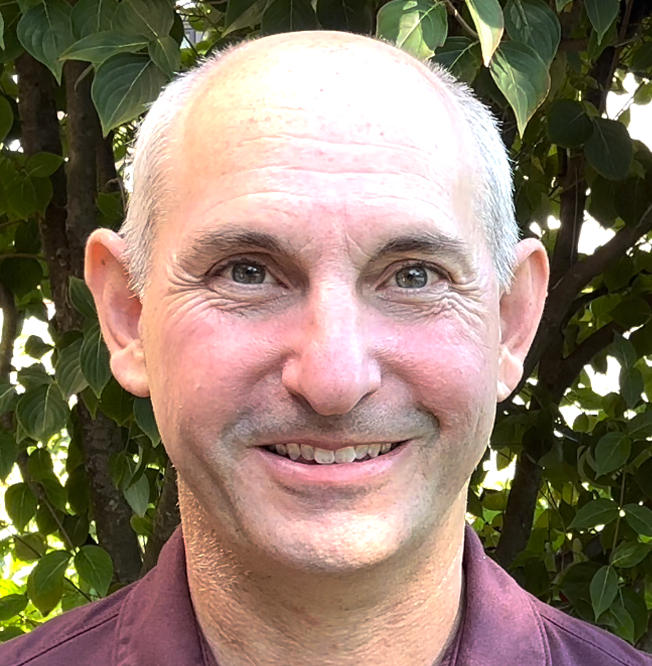
- Born: c. 1971 (age c. 54); United States
- Occupations: Writer, theoretical neuroscientist
- Known for: Game show contestant
- Website: ogiogas.substack.com

Ogi Ogas (born c. 1971) is an American writer and computational neuroscientist. As of May 2016, he is a visiting scholar at the Harvard Graduate School of Education, where he serves as Project Head for the Individual Mastery Project. Ogas is also known for his participation in game shows, especially Grand Slam (2007) and Who Wants to Be a Millionaire (2006).

== Early life and education ==
Ogi Ogas was born and grew up in Annapolis, Maryland. He attended Severna Park High School, where he was a member of the school's It's Academic team. In 1988, he received an AT&T engineering scholarship. In 1994, Ogas briefly attempted a PhD at the University of Iowa. Ogas was awarded a PhD in computational neuroscience by Boston University in 2009. He was a United States Department of Homeland Security Fellow during his graduate studies.

== Career ==
Ogas is a visiting scholar at the Harvard University School of Education.

Ogas is the Project Head for the Individual Mastery Project in the Harvard Graduate School of Education, which The Washington Post has described as "aimed at understanding the development of individual excellence."

== Written works ==
=== A Billion Wicked Thoughts ===
Ogas's nonfiction book A Billion Wicked Thoughts (2011, with Sai Gaddam) analyzed the sexual terms used in web searches by approximately 100 million internet users. In 2014, the main exhibition at the Museum of Sex in New York was devoted to the book.

=== The End of Average ===
In 2016, The End of Average (HarperOne), co-authored with Todd Rose, examined the limitations of the “average person” concept in science, education, and government.

=== The Drug Hunters ===
In 2017, The Drug Hunters (Skydance), co-authored with Donald Kirsch, explored the history and methods of pharmaceutical drug discovery.

=== Dark Horse ===
In 2018, Dark Horse (HarperOne), co-authored with Todd Rose, presented findings from the Dark Horse Project at Harvard and profiled individual who achieved success through unconventional paths.

=== This is What It Sounds Like ===
In 2022, W. W. Norton published This is What It Sounds Like: What the Music You Love Says About You, by Ogas and Susan Rogers.

=== Journey of the Mind ===
In 2022, Ogi Ogas co-authored Journey of the Mind: How Thinking Emerged from Chaos with Dr. Sai Gaddam, published by W. W. Norton & Company. The book retraced the evolution of thought and consciousness through insights from mathematical neuroscience.

=== Other contributions ===
==== Shrinks: The Untold Story of Psychiatry ====
Ogas is listed as a contributor to Jeffrey Lieberman's book Shrinks. As advertising prose from the Hachette Books Group describes it, the book:

traces the field from its birth as a mystic pseudo-science through its adolescence as a cult of "shrinks" to its late blooming maturity—beginning after World War II—as a science-driven profession that saves lives ... [including] ... case studies and portraits of the professionals of the field—from Sigmund Freud to Eric Kandel ...

Shrinks received a starred review in Kirkus Reviews, was a New York Times Book Review Editors' Choice, and was longlisted for the PEN/E.O.Wilson Literary Science Writing Award.

== Game show appearances ==
$1 Million (15 of 15) - No Time Limit
Which of these ships was not one of the three taken over by colonists during the Boston Tea Party?
• A: Eleanor	• B: Dartmouth
• C: Beaver	• D: William
Ogas's $1,000,000 question

Ogas won $500,000 on an episode of Who Wants to Be a Millionaire that aired on November 8, 2006, using his cognitive science research to guide his game strategy. Ogas has intimated in interviews that he had a strong hunch about his final question (about the Boston Tea Party, shown), after tentatively eliminating three of the choices; he ultimately decided to walk away because of the large amount of money at risk ($475,000 of his $500,000; a miss would have dropped him back to $25,000). His hunch was correct. Since playing, he has appeared 22 times as the syndicated show's "Ask The Expert" Lifeline.

Ogas was also a contestant on Grand Slam, which aired in August and September 2007. He said that after feeling the intense emotional pressure on Millionaire, he developed a new suite of cognitive techniques for Grand Slam, including calming techniques as well as mathematical, verbal, and mnemonic heuristics derived from his brain research. He defeated former Millionaire contestant Nancy Christy in his first-round game and all-time game show winnings record holder and Jeopardy! champion Brad Rutter in the second round. Ogas then defeated former Twenty-One champion David Legler in the semifinals before losing to Ken Jennings in the final. More recently, he appeared on ABC's game show 500 Questions as one of the challengers.
