= K2 Integrity =

American financial security company

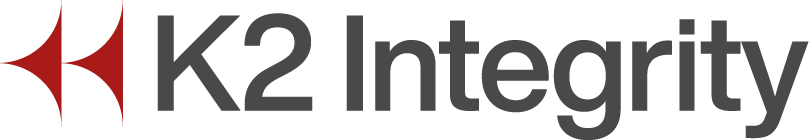

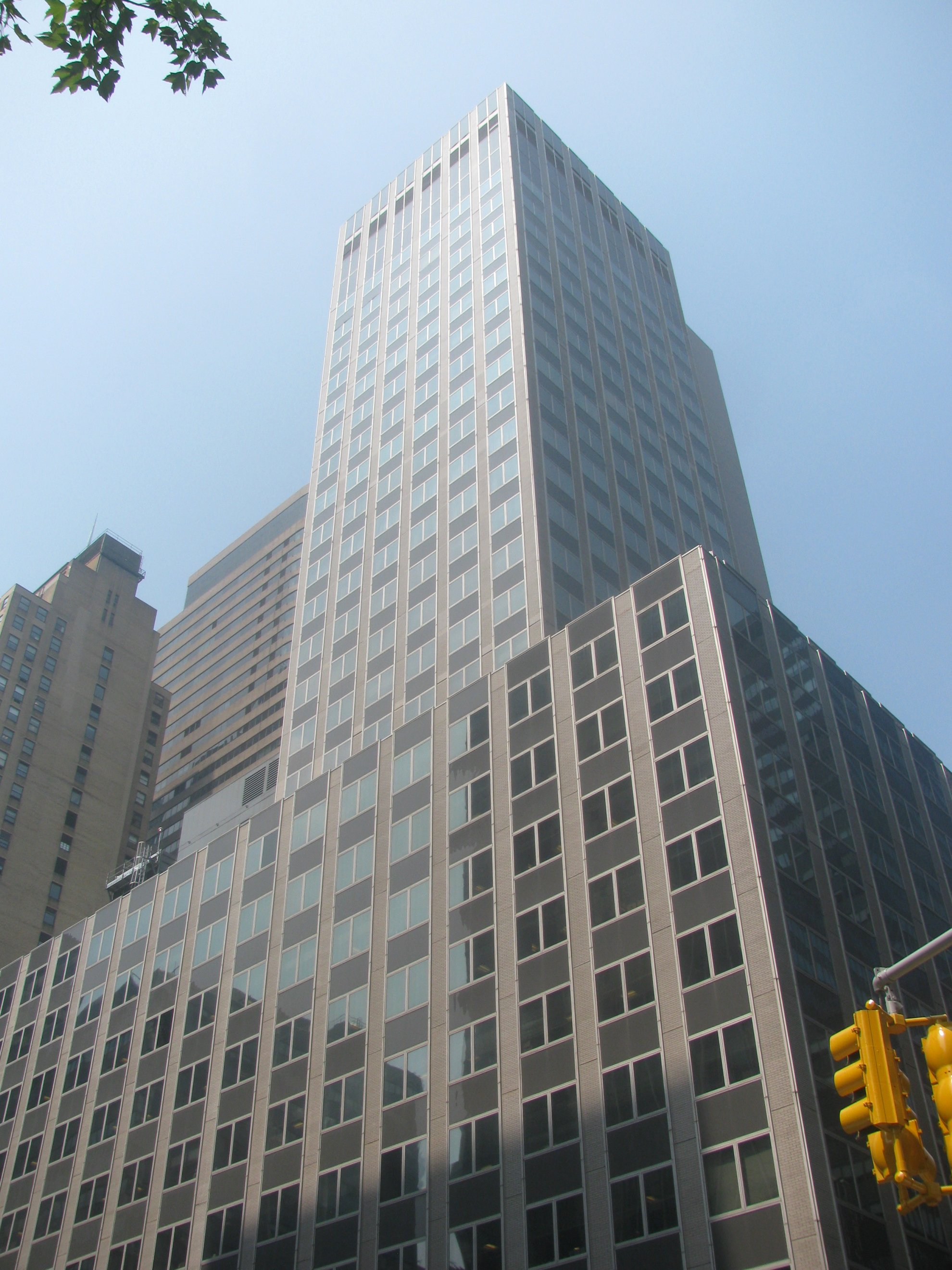
- New York headquarters at 730 Third Avenue
- Founded: 2009; 17 years ago
- Founder: Jeremy M. Kroll and Jules B. Kroll
- Headquarters: New York
- Website: https://www.k2integrity.com

K2 Integrity (formerly K2 Intelligence) is a financial crimes risk, compliance and advisory services firm. Founded in 2009 by Jeremy M. Kroll and Jules B. Kroll, the company is headquartered in New York City with international offices in London, England, Washington, D.C., Madrid, Spain, Geneva, Switzerland, Los Angeles, California, and Chicago, Illinois. In November 2020, K2 Intelligence rebranded to K2 Integrity.

Clients and industries served include financial institutions, law firms, hedge fund firms, private equity firms, governmental agencies, and private and sovereign clients.

As of 2020, the company employs a workforce of about 350 employees.

== History ==
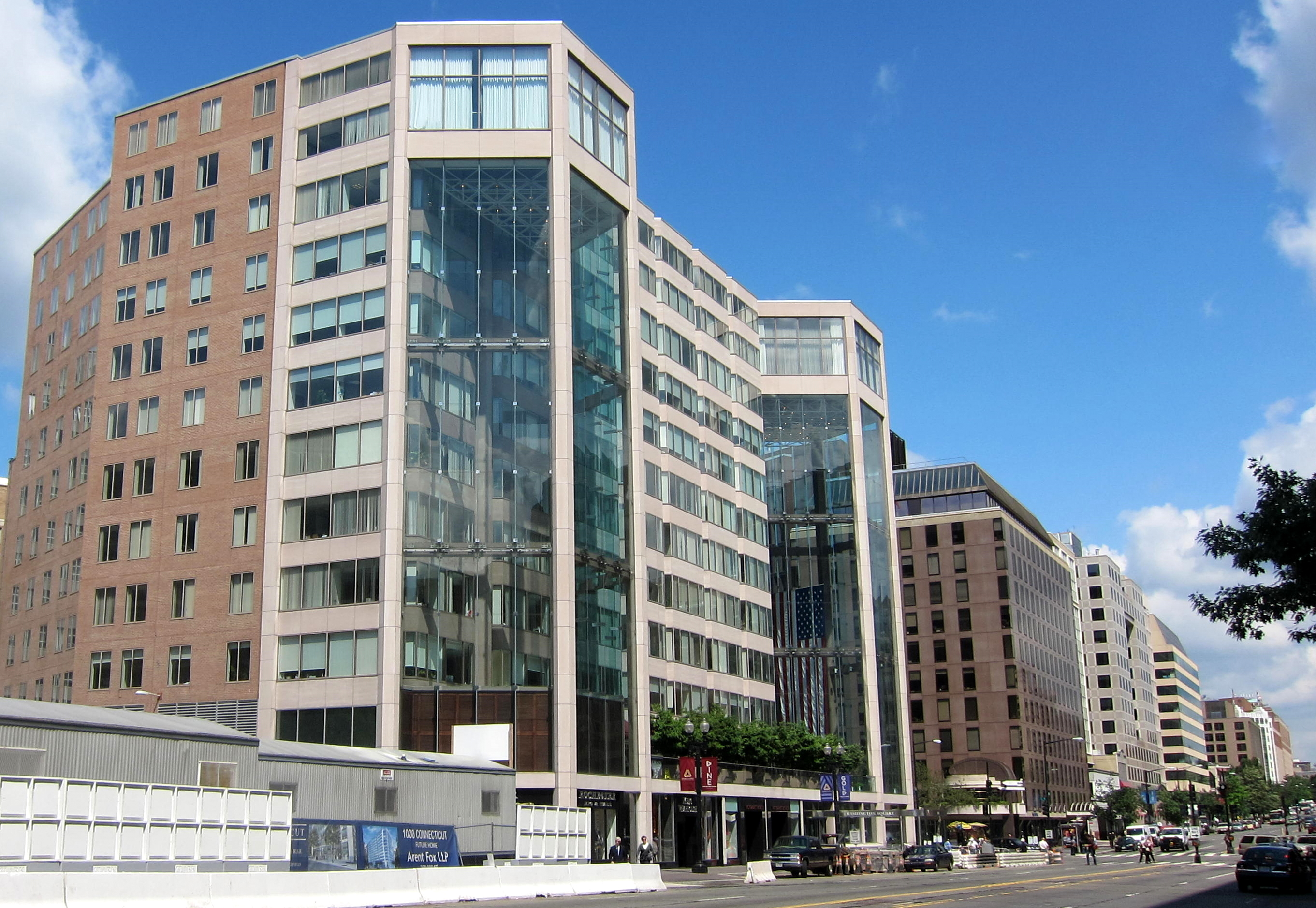
K2 Integrity office at Washington Square (foreground), located at 1050 Connecticut Avenue, N.W.

Jules Kroll and his son, Jeremy Kroll, opened K2 Intelligence's first office in London in 2009. Shortly after, the company's headquarters moved to a New York City location in January 2010. By April, a second office had opened in Madrid. In early 2013, K2 Intelligence had a workforce of 120 employees.

== Acquisitions ==
In December 2012, K2 Intelligence acquired Thacher Associates, which oversaw the cleanup of the World Trade Center site, the building of the new Yankee Stadium, and the construction of the Bank of America Tower in Manhattan.

== Notable investigations ==
During a 2013 public corruption case, the Moreland Commission of New York State, hired K2 Integrity "to search databases for donations linked to the passage of legislation or the awarding of state contracts."

In 2014, K2 Integrity provided data analytics litigation support to recover the stolen funds to be distributed back to the victims of the Bernie Madoff Ponzi scheme (Madoff investment scandal).

In 2018, a forensic investigation was completed on behalf of the International Boxing Association (AIBA) that documented gross negligence and financial mismanagement of AIBA affairs and finances.

K2 Integrity investigated a scam case known as the Con Queen of Hollywood. The multi-year investigation led to the arrest of the suspect in Manchester, England, on 26 November 2020.
