= The World Series of Pop Culture =

Television series

- Logo
- Genre: Game show
- Created by: Michael Davies
- Based on: Entertainment Weekly's Pop Culture Quiz
- Directed by: Wyatt Smith
- Starring: Pat Kiernan; Lisa Guerrero (2006); Erin Davidson (2007); Katherine Gotsick (2007); Amber Tillett (2007)
- Theme music composer: Wax Music and Sound Design New York City
- Country of origin: United States
- No. of episodes: 16

Production
- Executive producer: Michael Davies
- Producers: Tiffany Faigus; Bobby Patton
- Editors: Anthony Carbone; Matthew Giaquinto; Tony Pellegrino; Scott Silva; Wyatt Smith
- Running time: 60 minutes
- Production company: Embassy Row

Original release
- Network: VH1
- Release: July 10, 2006 – July 19, 2007

The World Series of Pop Culture (also known as 2007 World Series of Pop Culture in season 2) was a VH1 game show tournament program sponsored by Alltel Wireless, based on Entertainment Weekly's Pop Culture Quiz. Sixteen teams, comprising three people each, compete to determine which team, collectively, knows the most about elements of popular culture. One of the teams each season ("Almost Perfect Strangers" in season 1, "Almost Perfect Strangers 2.0" in season 2) was made up of three qualifiers selected on the basis of a test over the internet; the three internet qualifiers had no other connection to each other.

Tapings for the first season took place in New York City from April 29–30, 2006 at the Ziegfeld Theatre. A wide range of topics are covered such as movies, music, TV and other miscellaneous pop culture. The top prize was $250,000. The show began on July 10, 2006, and the finale aired on Thursday, August 3, 2006. The hosts were Pat Kiernan and Lisa Guerrero.

The second season of the show premiered on July 9, 2007. Auditions for the second season were held in January and February, and the tapings took place on March 22 and 23 at the Grand Ballroom of the Manhattan Center. There were two online qualification tests that season which took place on February 14 and February 20. Kiernan returned as host, with season 1 competitors "Cheetara" (Erin Davidson, Katherine Gotsick, and Amber Tillett) replacing Guerrero as backstage interviewers.

The World Series of Pop Culture was not renewed for a third season in 2008.

== Gameplay ==
Each show begins with a declaration of the rules:

"The game is played in a best-of-five-rounds format. After a category is announced, each team will send a representative to the microphone, who must play for the entire round. The player who answers the most questions correctly, out of a possible six total questions, in the round, will knock out his or her opponent. The first team to knock out all three members of the opposing team will be declared the winner and move on in the tournament."

During each round, the category will be revealed. Categories could be as broad as "Family TV" or as specific as "The Karate Kid." Once the category is revealed, the teams have to send a teammate to the microphone to play for that entire category. Unless only one player is left remaining, a player may not compete in two consecutive categories.

The chosen players each get one category per round, and each category contains six questions (three to each player). If a player cannot provide the right answer, his or her opponent gets the opportunity to steal. At the end of each category, the player who gets the fewest questions correct is eliminated from the game. Once a player attains enough points that the opponent cannot beat, the category ends at that point.

In the event of a tie, a tiebreaker question determines who remains in the competition and who gets knocked out. The tiebreaker question contains an even number of multiple answers. Both players give one answer in succession, starting with the player who answered first in the tied category, until one player gives an incorrect answer. When an incorrect answer is given, and if the score is still tied, the opposing player must give one more correct answer to win. If the opposing player already has more correct answers by virtue of going first, that player immediately wins the category.

If the tiebreaker ends unresolved, either with both players answering incorrectly or if all correct answers have been given, a new tiebreaker round begins, but the first player to answer is switched.

The first team to eliminate all three of their opponents wins and moves on to the next round.

In the first-season World Series of Pop Culture final, airing first on August 3, 2006 each category (namely "Tom Cruise Movies", "TV Teen Dramas", "1990s Lyrics", and "Fictional Locales") involved ten questions rather than the typical six. The second-season final featured six-question categories.
