= Michael Davies (television producer) =

British television game show producer (born 1966)

- Born: Michael Peterson Davies; 3 March 1966 (age 60); London, England
- Occupation: Television producer
- Years active: 1990–present
- Known for: Executive producer of Who Wants to Be a Millionaire (1999–2010, 2020–present); Co-host of Men in Blazers (2014–2024); Executive producer of Jeopardy! (2021–present)
- Spouses: Selena Richards (m. 1989; div. 1992); Claude Davies (divorced)
- Children: 4
- Relatives: William Davies (brother); Rebecca de Pont Davies (sister)

Michael Peterson Davies (born 3 March 1966) is an English-born American television game show producer. He is best known for bringing the game show Who Wants to Be a Millionaire to American television. Since 2014, he had hosted a podcast entitled Men in Blazers alongside journalist Roger Bennett. Since 2021, he has served as the executive producer of the game show Jeopardy! following Mike Richards' departure from the program due to various controversies.

== Early life ==
Davies grew up in Blackheath, London and attended Mercersburg Academy in Pennsylvania, graduating from the University of Edinburgh. He is the younger brother of opera singer Rebecca de Pont Davies and screenwriter William Davies.

== Career ==
=== Early career ===
In the early 1990s, Davies served as a development associate at Merv Griffin Enterprises. For a time afterward, he served as a senior vice president at Buena Vista Productions (a subsidiary of Disney), where he helped develop the game show Debt, a show with a format so similar to that of Jeopardy! that Merv Griffin Enterprises threatened legal action. In February 1998, Davies joined ABC as executive vice president. During this time, he served as a programming executive at WABC-TV, an ABC affiliate in New York City. He also served as the head of the network's reality programming division.

=== Diplomatic Productions ===
On December 12, 2000, Davies founded Diplomatic Productions, his first production company, with the help of ABC and Disney. On May 12, 2005, Diplomatic folded into Embassy Row after Davies joined forces with entertainment marketer Tera Banks and LivePlanet co-founder and former CEO Chris Moore.

=== Blogger ===
In 2002 and 2006, Davies wrote a blog about the 2002 FIFA World Cup and 2006 FIFA World Cup for ESPN.com.

=== Men in Blazers ===
Beginning in 2011, Davies and co-host and ESPNFC.com writer Roger Bennett, brought the Men in Blazers podcast to Grantland.com. The weekly podcast includes analysis of recent matches in the Premier League as well as coverage of the UEFA Champions League and various international fixtures, specifically the United States men's national soccer team games.

The duo were invited to provide analysis and humorous segments for ESPN live from Rio de Janeiro during the 2014 FIFA World Cup, especially from Bob Ley's "Panic Room". The duo did a live show from Portland, Oregon, for the 2014 MLS All-Star Game, interviewing the likes of Clint Dempsey and Alex Morgan while raising money for MLS Works and the Wounded Warrior Project.

In September 2014, they conducted a New York City FC exclusive interview with Frank Lampard after Lampard joined NYCFC from Chelsea. Fox Sports announced in April 2014 they had cancelled the Davies-produced program Crowd Goes Wild, a daily sports talk show from the national sports network Fox Sports 1.

Ahead of the 2014–15 Premier League season, NBC Sports signed Davies and Bennett from ESPN for its English Premier League coverage and confirmed that Men in Blazers would have its own half-hour television show on Monday nights at 10 pm EST, starting 22 September 2014.

Davies and Bennett host the Men in Blazers channel on EA Sports Talk Radio on the official 2014 FIFA World Cup video game, with Andy Goldstein of Talksport and Darke hosting the only other channel.

In April 2024, Davies left the podcast to focus on his other ventures.

=== Sony Pictures Television ===
==== Embassy Row ====
As president and CEO of Embassy Row, a New York City-based television production company that is a unit of Sony Pictures Television, he was the executive producer of Wife Swap. He produced ESPN's 2 Minute Drill, VH1's World Series of Pop Culture, CBS's Power of 10, and the GSN originals: Chain Reaction, Grand Slam, and GSN's revival of The Newlywed Game, as well as the American version of Who Wants to Be a Millionaire.

==== Jeopardy! ====
In 2021, Sony appointed Davies to serve as interim executive producer of Jeopardy! when Mike Richards was let go after controversies came to light. (Note: Despite claims that Michael Davies will serve as an interim executive producer on Wheel of Fortune following Mike Richards' departure, he never actually assumed that role, with the show's senior producer Steve Schwartz serving as an uncredited interim executive producer for the rest of the show's 39th season before settling with Bellamie Blackstone in the 40th season.) On April 14, 2022, Davies announced that he would be taking over the position full-time. So far, under Davies' tenure, he has created daily box scores for each episode, creating a "Second Chance Tournament" to air before the show's "Tournament of Champions", as well as an "Invitational Tournament" that immediately aired after the Tournament of Champions, creating a new holiday for the show entitled JeoparDAY! held on the show's birthday every year on March 30, as well as creating daily recaps of the show known as Jeopardy! Highlights.

In August 2022, Davies, along with former Jeopardy! Clue Crew member and current producer Sarah Whitcomb Foss and Jeopardy! champion Buzzy Cohen, began hosting a podcast about the game show entitled Inside Jeopardy! which takes a look behind the scenes from the quiz show like gameplay analysis, behind-the-scenes stories, official announcements, and special interviews. Cohen left in 2024 and was replaced by Jeopardy! Professors Tournament champion Sam Buttrey.

Since 2024, he has served as executive producer on the franchise spin-off, Pop Culture Jeopardy!, for Amazon Prime Video and Netflix.

== Personal life ==
On December 28, 1989, Davies married Selena Richards in Reno, Nevada. The couple divorced in 1992. Afterwards, he married documentary producer Claude Davies whom he later divorced. He had a daughter, Brea, through his relationship with Selena and three children through his relationship with Claude.

He is a fan of Chelsea F.C.

== Filmography ==
Year	Title	Role	Notes
2000	The 27th Annual Daytime Emmy Awards	Himself	
2001	The 28th Annual Daytime Emmy Awards	Himself	
2014	Men in Blazers World Cup Preview	Host	
2014–2015	Late Night with Seth Meyers	Himself	3 episodes
2015–2016	The Men in Blazers Show	Host	13 episodes
2018	Rog & Davo's Guide to Russia	Himself	10 episodes
2018	CBS News Sunday Morning	Himself	1 episode
2018	Cover Story	Himself	1 episode
2022	Watch What Happens Live with Andy Cohen	Bartender	1 episode
2022–present	Inside Jeopardy!	Host	29 episodes
