= Silvagni =

Silvagni is a surname. Notable people with the surname include:

- Alex Silvagni (born 1987), Australian rules footballer
- Fabrice Silvagni (born 1966), Belgian football manager and former footballer
- Jack Silvagni (born 1997), Australian rules footballer
- Jo Silvagni (born 1970), Australian model and television personality and hostess/compere
- Sergio Silvagni (1938–2021), Australian rules footballer
- Stephen Silvagni (born 1967), Australian rules footballer
