= Miss USA 1975 =

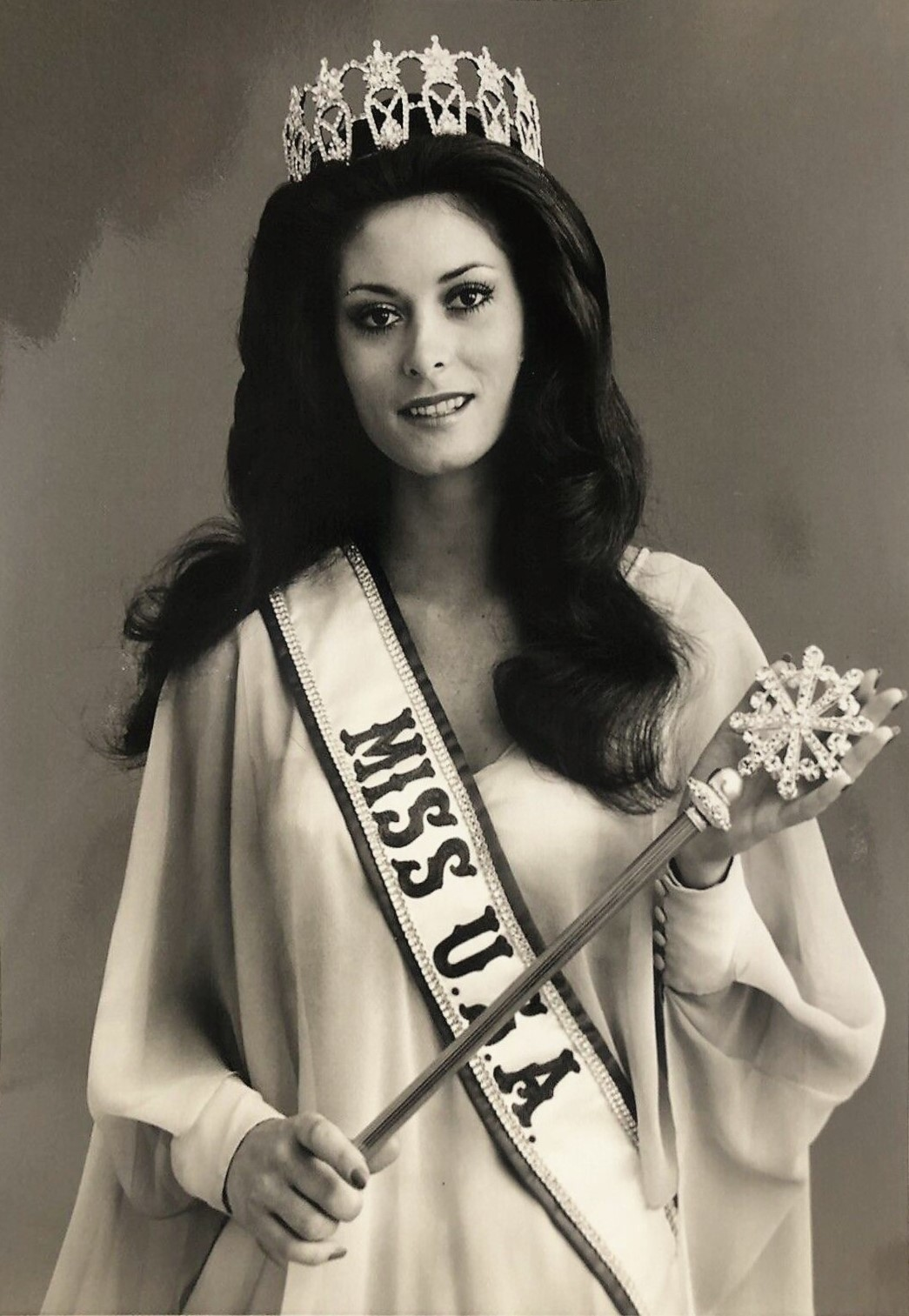
- Summer Bartholomew, Miss USA 1975
- Date: May 17, 1975
- Presenters: Bob Barker
- Venue: Niagara Falls, New York
- Broadcaster: CBS, WBEN-TV
- Entrants: 51
- Placements: 12
- Winner: Summer Bartholomew; California
- Congeniality: Constance Crabtree; Vermont
- Photogenic: Pamela Flowers; Alabama

Miss USA 1975 was the 24th Miss USA pageant, televised live by CBS from Niagara Falls, New York on May 17, 1975.

The pageant was won by Summer Bartholomew of California, who was crowned by outgoing titleholder Karen Morrison of Illinois. Bartholomew was the third woman from California to win the Miss USA title, and went on to place as 2nd runner-up at Miss Universe 1975. She later went to work with Jim Perry on Sale of the Century on NBC from 1983 to 1989.

== Results ==
| Final Results | Contestant |
|---|---|
| Miss USA 1975 | California – Summer Bartholomew |
| 1st Runner-Up | Alabama – Pamela Flowers |
| 2nd Runner-Up | North Carolina – Constance Dorn |
| 3rd Runner-Up | Florida – Mary Humes |
| 4th Runner-Up | Texas – Aundie Evers |
| Top 12 | (Washington, D.C.) District of Columbia – Mary Lamond; Hawaii – Lois Wise; Indiana – Jo Ellen Berryman; Kentucky – Carol Wallace; Missouri – Nancy LaRose; New Jersey – Cathy Russell; Virginia – Linda McKee |

=== Special awards ===
| Award | Contestant |
|---|---|
| Miss Amity (Congeniality) | Vermont – Constance Crabtree |
| Miss Photogenic | Alabama – Pamela Flowers |
| Best State Costume | Oklahoma - Gayla Bryan |

== Delegates ==
The Miss USA 1975 delegates were:

- Alabama – Pamela Flowers
- Alaska – Andie Higgins
- Arizona – Sanna Osgood
- Arkansas – Robin Fields
- California - Summer Bartholomew
- Colorado – Amy Long
- Connecticut – Michele Menegay
- Delaware – Sandy McClure
- (Washington, D.C.) District of Columbia – Mary Lamond
- Florida – Mary Humes
- (Georgia (U.S. state)) Georgia – Diana Goodman
- Hawaii – Lois Wise
- Idaho – Charlene McArthur
- Illinois – Connie Reif
- Indiana – Jo Ellen Berryman
- Iowa – Kathleen "Kathie" Duggan
- Kansas – Robbin Loomas
- Kentucky – Carol Wallace
- Louisiana – Rhonda Shear
- Maine – Denise Hill
- Maryland – Ellen Bowie
- Massachusetts – Rilla Posson
- Michigan – Debra Holland
- Minnesota – Dawn Carol LaMotte
- Mississippi – Leigh Ann Cross
- Missouri – Nancy LaRose
- Montana – Suzanne DeMier
- Nebraska – Mary Lee Hoth
- Nevada – Madonna Allison
- New Hampshire – Bonnie Gates
- New Jersey – Cathy Russell
- New Mexico – Maxie Whisler
- (New York (state)) New York – Sonja Anderson
- North Carolina – Constance Dorn
- North Dakota – Renee Seville
- Ohio – Sandra Kurdas
- Oklahoma – Gayla Bryan
- Oregon – Theresa Favreau
- Pennsylvania – Pat Hurley
- Rhode Island – Marice Love
- South Carolina – Robin Ann Morris
- South Dakota – Lanette Rabenberg
- Tennessee – Shelly Smith
- Texas – Aundie Evers
- Utah – Andrea Felt
- Vermont – Constance "Pinky" Crabtree
- Virginia – Linda McKee
- (Washington (state)) Washington – Cindy Baxter
- West Virginia – Joyce Myers
- Wisconsin – Rita Pedder
- Wyoming – Kim Pring

== Judges ==
- F. Lee Bailey — lawyer
- Peggy Fleming — Olympic figure skater
- Bobbie Gentry — singer-songwriter
- Aldo Gucci — Chairman of Gucci
- David Hale — President of the U.S. Jaycees
- Geoffrey Holder — actor, dancer, choreographer, director
- Julia Meade — actress, TV personality
- Robin Moore — author
- Craig Morton — New York Giants quarterback
- Deborah Shelton — Miss USA 1970 from Virginia
- George Stavropoulos — fashion designer
