= Summer Altice =

American fashion model and actress

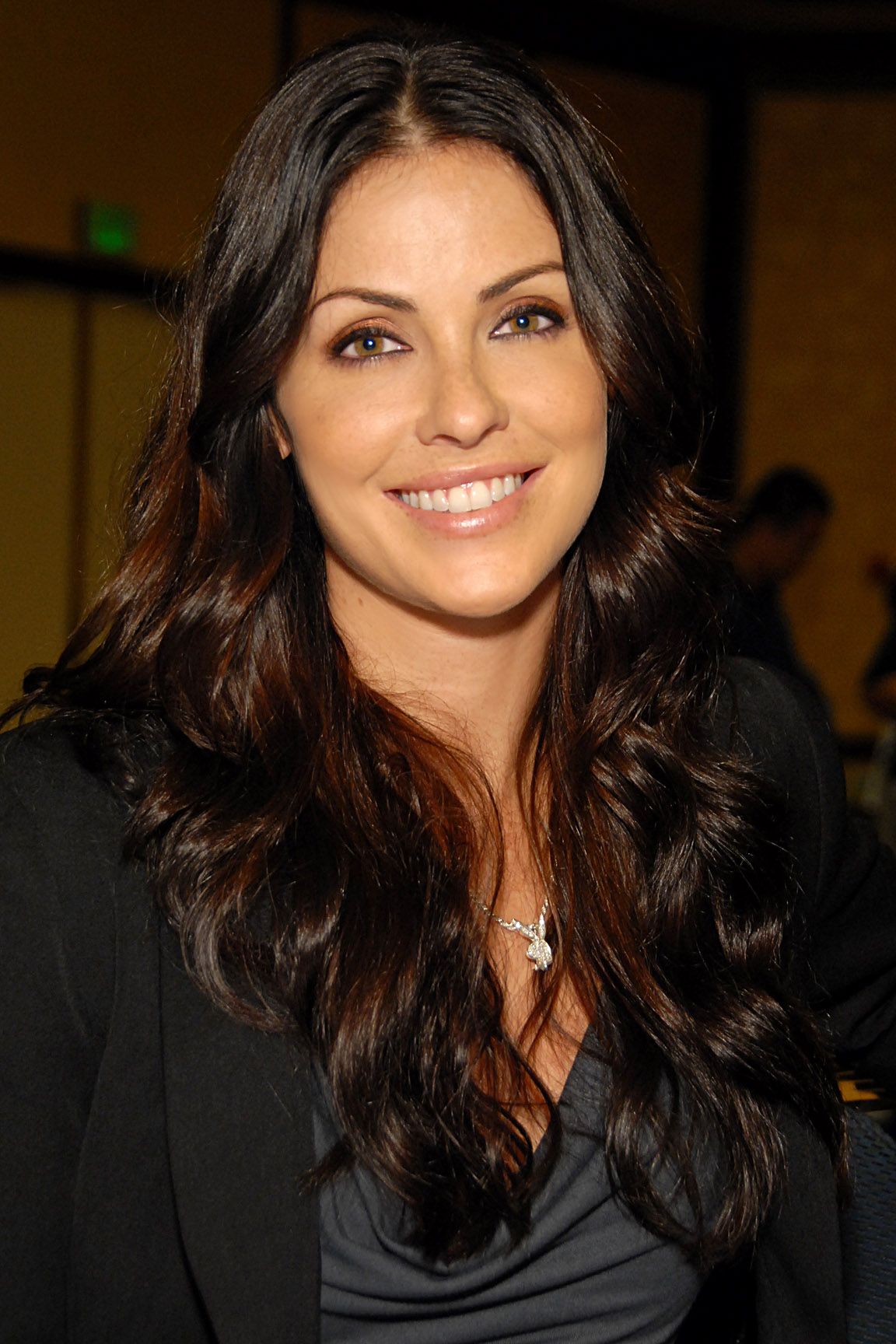
- Altice attending the "Sign Of The Times" model convention at the LAX Marriott, Los Angeles, October 2011
- Born: Summer Danielle Altice; December 23, 1979 (age 46); Fountain Valley, California, U.S.
- Occupations: Model, actress

Playboy centerfold appearance
- August 2000
- Preceded by: Neferteri Shepherd
- Succeeded by: Kerissa Fare

Personal details
- Height: 5 ft 10.5 in (1.79 m)

Summer Danielle Altice (born December 23, 1979) is an American model and former actress. She was named after Miss USA 1975, Summer Bartholomew.

== Early life and education ==
Altice was born in Fountain Valley, California. She studied and played volleyball at San Diego State University and was named to the Academic All-WAC team.

== Career ==
She won Young and Modern (YM) magazine's cover girl contest in 1995 plus she was on the cover of YM's November issue that year and subsequently signed with Elite modeling agency before appearing on the cover of GQ as well as men's magazines Maxim and Max. She was ranked number 100 in Stuff magazine's "102 Sexiest Women In The World" in 2002.

Altice was Playboy's Playmate of the Month for August 2000.

One of her earliest film appearances was being cast in the films The Scorpion King, Grind, and the Showtime program ChromiumBlue.com.

=== Other ventures ===
Summer Altice, besides still acting, is now a Sommelier based in Los Angeles, and works as a private cellar manager to many well known Celebrities and Athletes. She received her certification in March 2015.

== Filmography ==
- Shanghai Kiss
- You, Me and Dupree
- Wedding Crashers
- Grind
- The Scorpion King
- Extraction
- One Tree Hill
- ChromiumBlue.com
- Pretty Cool
- Emmanuelle 2000: Emmanuelle Pie
- Learning to Surf
- Playboy Video Playmate Calendar 2002
- California Girls

Carol and Darlene Bernaola	Suzanne Stokes	Nicole Lenz	Brande Roderick	Brooke Berry	Shannon Stewart
Neferteri Shepherd	Summer Altice	Kerissa Fare	Nichole Van Croft	Buffy Tyler	Cara Michelle
