= Steve Price (broadcaster) =

Australian broadcaster

- Born: 13 January 1955 (age 71); Adelaide, Australia
- Occupations: Talkback radio broadcaster, opinion columnist and television personality
- Spouse: Wendy Black (m. 2005)
- Children: 2

Steven William Price (born 13 January 1955) is an Australian radio and television broadcaster and opinion columnist.

He regularly appeared on The Project. In 2022, Price announced his contract with Triple M was not renewed. Price worked at Macquarie Media broadcasting on 2GB, 4BC and 3AW. Previously, he was the program director and breakfast presenter at MTR 1377.

He formerly worked for Fairfax Media, presenting the morning shift between 9 am and 12 noon on 2UE. He has been in journalism for over 30 years, firstly with News Limited, and also at 3AW.

== Career ==
Price was program director and drive announcer on 3AW from 1987, moving to mornings with 2UE in 2002. In December 2009 saw this change, with regular fill-in host Steve Liebmann taking over. He has written weekly columns in the Herald Sun.

Price was featured in John Safran's Music Jamboree in which Safran produced aspirin tablets with the 3AW logo and convinced Price that they were ecstasy tablets being sold as "The Angry Dwarfs" and was known throughout Melbourne as the "poisoned dwarf".

In November 2004, Price and 2UE colleague John Laws were found guilty of homosexual vilification after an on-air discussion about a gay couple appearing on television. They described the couple as "young poofs".

Price played a supporting role in the 2008 Australian film noir short film Noir Drive. On 9 December 2009, Price announced that he would be leaving 2UE after eight years, saying the time was right to explore new opportunities.

Price became the breakfast host on Melbourne talkback radio station MTR 1377 after it replaced 3MP in April 2010. Daily contributors to Price's breakfast show included Andrew Bolt, Jason Akermanis and Sam Newman. MTR 1377 ceased operation in March 2012.

In April 2012, Price was appointed nights presenter on 2GB in Sydney. Although presenting to a Sydney audience, Price remained based in Melbourne. He is also a correspondent for New Zealand radio station Newstalk ZB and contributor on Mike Hosking Breakfast.

In January 2017, Price appeared as a contestant on the third season of I'm a Celebrity...Get Me Out of Here!, filmed in the jungle of South Africa. On 9 March 2017, Price was eliminated from the series after 42 days coming in 5th place.

On 13 December 2019, it was announced that Price would not be returning to 2GB Sydney and 4BC Brisbane in 2020.

Price appeared as a weekly panelist on The Project, a role he held throughout the 16 year run of the series. Beginning in 2020, he is also a regular contributor on Melbourne's Triple M.

In April 2021, Southern Cross Austereo announced that Price would host Australia Today with Steve Price from 7am to 10am (AEST) on weekdays via the LISTNR app. The show concluded in December 2022.

Price now hosts a self-titled weekly show at 6pm Fridays on Sky News Australia. He is also a regular fill-in host for Peta Credlin.

== Personal life ==
Price's second wife, Wendy Black, is the granddaughter of J. A. McLaughlin, a former President of the Shire of Wangaratta. Black was Chief of Staff to former Australian federal Minister for the Environment, Greg Hunt and press secretary to Joe Hockey. By March 2022, Price was dating Sacha French, a radio content manager.

In June 2007, Price was convicted of drink driving, which included a disqualification from driving for six months and a fine of $1,000.
