= Neferteri Shepherd =

American model and actress (born 1980)

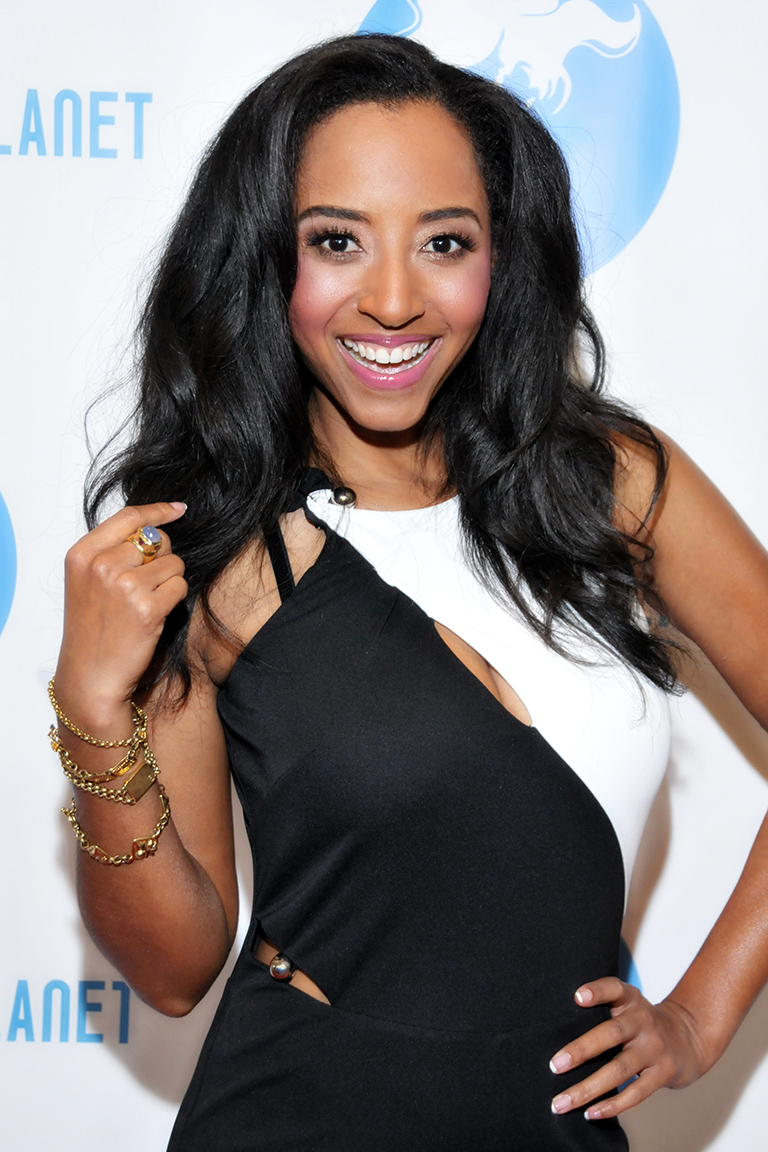
- Shepherd in 2016
- Born: Neferteri Sheba Shepherd; September 8, 1980 (age 46); New Orleans, Louisiana, U.S.
- Occupations: Actress; model

Playboy centerfold appearance
- July 2000
- Preceded by: Shannon Stewart
- Succeeded by: Summer Altice

Personal details
- Height: 5 ft 9 in (1.75 m)

Neferteri Sheba Plessy (née Shepherd; born September 8, 1980) is an American model and actress. She is Playboy's Playmate of the Month for July 2000 and has appeared in Playboy videos.

Shepherd is also a mother of two, a blogger and a TV host; her spare time is spent managing Single Mom Planet. "Single Mom Planet is meant to empower single moms such as myself to live a dynamic life that they love," she has explained. "We host events so moms can meet and share advice. We also have a website where moms can get recipes, exercise tips and advice on dating, relationships and raising their kids."

== Biography ==
Born in New Orleans, Louisiana, Neferteri Shepherd relocated to Los Angeles in pursuit of her dreams of becoming an actress and model. Her great ambition led to her being booked as a leading model on the American Music Awards, on the runways of Baby Phat and Stuff Magazine, and featured in a National Ad Campaign with the athletic apparel company Privacy Wear. She has also been featured in the pages of Maxim magazine.

Neferteri's screen appearances include co-hosting VH1's Sex & Rock Roll, she is the leading lady in platinum selling recording artist music videos (50 Cents to Usher) and her commercial appearances include an Arby's spot that is presently airing nationally, sitcoms include UPN's The Parkers and FOX's Method and Red, and the movie "Hair Show," starring Monique. She's also the featured actress for the new 2005 Starz network imaging campaign.

Also participated in the game Street Racing Syndicate (2004), where shot for the winning video with dancing girls.

She is producing television shows and is being mentored by producer Rushion McDonald of Nu-Opp Inc. She has two shows in development and a pilot being filmed at WB titled "Mobile Home Disaster," a reality makeover show for trailer park homes.

== Filmography ==
- 1999 - The Parkers (Receptionist)
- 2003 - A Miami Tail (Nike)
- 2004 - Hair Show (Ria)
- 2004 - Method & Red (-)
- 2005 - Mobile Home Disaster (-)
- 2008 - The Candy Shop (Diamond Ring Client)
- 2009 - One Story (Jessica)
- 2015 - The Man in 3B (Cain's Girl #2)

Carol and Darlene Bernaola	Suzanne Stokes	Nicole Lenz	Brande Roderick	Brooke Berry	Shannon Stewart
Neferteri Shepherd	Summer Altice	Kerissa Fare	Nichole Van Croft	Buffy Tyler	Cara Michelle
