= Sale of the Century =

American game show

- Genre: Game show
- Created by: Al Howard
- Presented by: Jack Kelly; Joe Garagiola; Jim Perry
- Starring: Barbara Lyon; Kit Dougherty; Madelyn Sanders; Sally Julian; Lee Menning; Summer Bartholomew
- Announcer: Bill Wendell; Jay Stewart; Don Morrow
- Theme music composer: Ray Ellis & Marc Ellis (1983–89 version)
- Opening theme: "Mercedes" (1983–89 version)
- Country of origin: United States
- Original language: English
- No. of seasons: 5 (1969–74); 7 (1983–89)
- No. of episodes: approx. 990 (NBC 1969–73); 39 (SYN 1973–74); 1,578 (NBC 1983–89); 220 (SYN 1985–86)

Production
- Production locations: NBC Studios; New York, New York (1969–74); NBC Studios; Burbank, California (1983–89)
- Running time: 22–24 minutes
- Production companies: Al Howard Productions (1969–74); Reg Grundy Productions (1983–89)

Original release
- Network: NBC
- Release: September 29, 1969 – July 13, 1973
- Network: Syndicated
- Release: September 1973 – 1974
- Network: NBC
- Release: January 3, 1983 – March 24, 1989
- Network: Syndicated
- Release: January 7, 1985 – September 12, 1986

Sale of the Century (stylized as $ale of the Century) is an American television game show that originally debuted on September 29, 1969, on NBC daytime. It was one of three NBC game shows to premiere on that date, the other two being the short-lived game shows Letters to Laugh-In and Name Droppers. The series aired until July 13, 1973, and a weekly syndicated series began that fall and ran for one season.

The rights to the show were purchased in 1980 by Australian TV mogul Reg Grundy, who produced a similar show called Great Temptation in the 1970s. Grundy subsequently launched an Australian version of Sale of the Century. Grundy's modified format was then used in a revived American Sale of the Century that aired on NBC from January 3, 1983, to March 24, 1989. It was one of three NBC game shows premiering on the same date, along with Hit Man and Just Men! (both of which aired for only 13 weeks), and—like its predecessor—spawned a syndicated edition that ran from January 7, 1985, to September 12, 1986. Grundy's format has also been adopted in other countries.

The game consists of contestants answering general knowledge questions. At certain points during the game, the player currently in the lead is offered an "Instant Bargain", a prize to keep regardless of the game's outcome, in exchange for a certain amount deducted from that contestant's score.

Actor Jack Kelly hosted the original series from 1969 to 1971, then decided to return to acting full-time. He was replaced by Joe Garagiola, who hosted the remainder of the daytime series plus the one season in syndication. Jim Perry then hosted both the NBC and syndicated 1980s versions. Al Howard was the executive producer of the initial 1969–1974 version, and for a short time was co-executive producer of the 1980s version with Robert Noah.

A short-lived revival of the series entitled Temptation, like the 2005 Australian revival, debuted in syndication on September 10, 2007, following a September 7 preview on MyNetworkTV. This series ran for one year.

== Game format ==
Contestants answered general knowledge toss-up questions posed by the host, earning $5 for a correct answer or losing that amount for a miss. Unlike most other game shows of the time, though, only the first contestant to buzz in could answer a question; a miss took it out of play for the other two.

At certain points during the game, the contestant in the lead participated in an "Instant Bargain" and was offered the opportunity to purchase merchandise at a bargain price. The selling price for the item, generally the value of one or more questions, was then deducted from the contestant's score, and the prize was theirs to keep regardless of the game's outcome.

Depending upon the version, question values either remained at $5 or increased as the game progressed. Additional Instant Bargains were also offered. The contestant in the lead at the end of the game was declared the champion and used their final score to purchase a larger prize, or played a separate end game, which varied depending upon the version of the show.

=== 1969–1974 ===
From 1969 to 1973, the game featured three contestants, who all began with $25. Midway through the game, the question values doubled to $10. At first, the final round consisted of 30 seconds of $15 questions. Later, this was replaced with five $20 questions (called "The Century Round", as the total value of the questions was $100). If a contestant's total was reduced to zero (or lower), that contestant was eliminated from the game.

At certain points during gameplay, all contestants were offered the opportunity to purchase merchandise at a bargain price. The first contestant to buzz in after the prize was revealed purchased that prize, and the price was deducted from his or her score. The prices of all prizes offered were expressed much as one would hear in a department store (ending with "and 95 cents"), and the prices increased as the episode progressed (e.g., $7.95, $11.95, $14.95, $21.95). All prize values were rounded up to the nearest dollar before being subtracted from the score of the contestant who purchased the prize. Each Instant Bargain was hidden behind a curtain, and contestants could not buzz in before the curtain opened. A contestant who did buzz in early was penalized by having the cost of the Instant Bargain deducted from their score and being locked out of purchasing the prize.

The "Open House" round was played in early episodes of the original version, usually about halfway through a particular episode. Five prizes were presented to the contestants and each could buy as many of them as he or she wanted; they had five seconds to list each of the items they wanted to buy. Unlike Instant Bargains, multiple contestants could buy the same item. This was later replaced with an "Audience Sale" round in which three members of the studio audience guessed the "sale price" of an item. The one that bid closest without going over won the item. The three contestants could increase their score by correctly guessing which audience member would win.

During the last thirteen weeks of this series, and the aforementioned follow-up weekly syndicated series, two married couples competed instead of three individual contestants. Each couple was given $20 at the start of the game. On the syndicated version, the first round consisted of questions worth $5, and in the second questions were valued at $10. A series of five questions worth $20 each were asked to conclude the game. If either couple's score reached $0, both couples were given an additional $20.

The winning contestant or couple was given the opportunity to spend their score on at least one of several grand prizes at the "Sale of the Century". Contestants either purchased a prize with their winnings and retired, or elected to return the next day and try to win enough to buy a more expensive prize. Champions could buy more than one prize. Also, when contestants chose to return the next day, they were asked which prizes they were considering buying. As long as the contestant kept winning, those prizes remained while others were replaced by more expensive ones.

The 1973–74 syndicated version featured two different formats. Both offered three possible prizes (almost always a trip, a fur coat, and a car), only one of which the couple could win. Originally, each prize had a sale price, and Garagiola asked questions worth $100 each, which was added to the couple's score from the game. When the amount reached the sale price of a prize, the couple could buy the prize or keep playing for a more expensive prize. Later, this was changed to "The Game of Champions". The three prizes had sale amounts ($150, $300, and $600). The winning couple chose a prize and had to answer three questions (worth $50, $100, or $200 each, depending on the prize) in order to win.

=== 1983–1989 ===
==== Original format ====
Three contestants competed each day, usually a returning champion and two challengers, and were each given $20 at the start of the game. Except for Fame Game questions, contestants earned $5 for a correct answer and were penalized $5 for an incorrect answer. A contestant's score, however, could not be reduced below $0. Contestants could buzz-in before the question was finished, but had to answer based only on whatever information the host had read to that point; only one contestant could answer a question.

Three Instant Bargains were played per game, with the prizes' retail values and sale prices increasing as the game progressed. In some cases, the host would reduce the price and/or offer extra cash to entice a contestant to make a purchase. During an Instant Bargain, only the player in the lead could purchase the prize available; in the event of a tie, the first player to buzz-in (if any) received the prize. For a brief time in early 1984, any contestant who bought an Instant Bargain could win back the money they spent by correctly answering a "Money Back Question" immediately afterward. Also, on occasion, any Instant Bargains that were not bought would be packaged as part of a "Garage Sale". If the player(s) in the lead did not elect to buy the Garage Sale package, the other contestants were invited to buy the prize set, unlike the normal Instant Bargains.

Three Fame Game rounds were played per game as well. The first half of each round consisted of a "who-am-I?"-style question, starting with obscure clues and proceeding to easier ones as the host continued. A contestant who buzzed in with a correct answer played the second half of the round; giving an incorrect answer eliminated a player from the round, but with no score penalty. If none of the contestants answered correctly, the second half of the round was skipped.

The contestant who answered correctly was given a choice of nine spaces on the Fame Game board, each displaying the face of a celebrity. Eight of the spaces hid either small bonus prizes or various amounts of cash, some of which offered the contestant a choice between taking either the money or an extra turn. Hidden behind one space was a $25 Money Card, which added that amount to the contestant's score. Spaces were removed from play as they were revealed. After the third playing, the host asked three final $5 toss-up questions to end the game. Beginning in 1984, the final three questions were replaced with the 'Speedround'. Jim Perry and the contestants would ask & answer as many questions as possible in 60 seconds, the leader winning when the clock hit zero.

The contestant with the highest final score became the champion. If the match ended in a tie, the tied players were asked one more question (originally in the Fame Game format, soon changed to an ordinary toss-up). Buzzing in and answering correctly won the game, while answering incorrectly resulted in a loss. In both cases, the losing contestants kept all cash and prizes they had accumulated, including their final scores in cash.

==== Bonus Round ====
The champion was taken shopping and shown a gallery of prizes that were available for potential purchase. Originally, there were six prizes, with each one increasing in value and sale price, and they would be swapped out every five shows. Every new champion was given the choice to buy the first, least expensive prize with their winning score or bank the money and return to try to win enough for a more expensive prize on display. For each subsequent win, the champion would be presented with this decision to either buy the highest-level prize they could afford and leave the show or keep playing, as a defeat would result in them only receiving what they had managed to win in the main game.

Higher prize levels often featured merchandise such as fur coats, expensive jewelry, and opulent vacations, and the sixth level offered a luxury automobile or sportscar. If a champion reached the highest prize level with their total, they would be able to purchase all of the shopping prizes on display. For the first few months of the show, this would include enough cash to make the package worth $95,000. A cash jackpot was later added to the package, available for purchase after the car; the jackpot started at $50,000 and increased by $1,000 for each day it went unclaimed. Overall, with the addition of the jackpot, the entire prize package was typically worth over $100,000.

The syndicated series employed a slightly different set of rules for its shopping game. Like the daytime series, the syndicated Sale did have a total of eight prize levels. However, the cash jackpot was not available for purchase. Instead at the seventh prize level, a champion could opt to buy all six shopping prizes or continue on; if the champion won his/her next game with enough money, they would win the jackpot along with all six prizes.

On rare occasions, a champion would enter a match needing a certain amount for one prize (such as a fur coat) and win with a high enough score to reach the one above it (such as a car). When such a situation arose, unless the winning amount was enough to allow him/her to buy the entire package of prizes, the champion was allowed to buy either of the two prizes but not both. On the syndicated series, there was also an addendum to this rule involving the two prize levels before the final level. If a contestant entered a match needing a certain amount to buy the car, but won enough over the course of that game to enable him/her to buy all of the shopping prizes, he/she would not be allowed to choose the car by itself.

All the shopping prizes were swapped out for different ones every five shows. If a contestant's reign was to continue past the Friday of a particular week, the host offered a reminder that a different set of prizes would be offered beginning on the next show and told the champion what the next available prize in line would be.

==== Later changes ====
===== Main game =====
By July 1983, the Fame Game underwent two changes. The first involved the use of three Money Cards, worth $10, $15, and $25, which were added to the board one at a time in ascending order. Occasionally, a fourth card worth $5 was placed on the board with the $10 card. Later in March 1984, the famous faces on the Fame Game board were replaced by numbers, and for a brief time in late 1984, there was a "$5+" Money Card, entitling the contestant who found it to immediately pick another number and receive whatever was behind it in addition to the $5 score boost. Even later, in October 1985, a randomizer was added to the Fame Game board and the player in control hit their buzzer to freeze it and thus choose a number, similar to the CBS game show Press Your Luck. When this change was made, the locations of the Money Cards were shown to the players and the $5 card was discontinued.

The regular game format also underwent a significant change in March 1984 when the series followed the Australian Sale's lead by replacing the final three questions after the last Fame Game with a 60-second speed round. Beginning in May 1984, a "Sale Surprise" was occasionally and secretly added to certain Instant Bargains. It was only revealed after the contestant either purchased or passed on a prize, and consisted of a cash bonus in addition to any money the host might have already offered.

In March 1986, the third Instant Bargain was replaced by an "Instant Cash" game. The leading contestant was offered a chance at a cash jackpot at the cost of their entire lead over the second-place player. In case of a tie, the host named a starting price and gradually lowered it until one contestant buzzed in. Accepting the deal gave the player a choice of three boxes, two of which contained $100 each. The third box held the jackpot, which started at $1,000 and increased by that amount every day it went unclaimed.

Beginning in late December 1987, a prize was awarded to the winner of the match. Originally, there were six prizes on offer each week, each hidden behind a number, and the winner of the game received one of them. The prize was determined at first by the champion's selection of one number during the game, and later by the winner's selection at its end. Beginning in August 1988, the prize was predetermined before the show and the host announced it at the beginning of the match.

===== Bonus Round #2: The Winner's Board =====
Sale later did away with the shopping round in favor of a new bonus where a champion was guaranteed to win a prize after every match. The Winner's Board, as the round was named, debuted in October of 1984 on the daytime series and in November of 1985 on the syndicated series; on the last day of the shopping round, the champion was awarded the most expensive shopping prize he/she could afford before continuing on as champion.

A new champion faced a grid of 20 numbered squares, behind which 10 prizes were hidden. The two largest prizes, a car and $10,000 cash, were behind one number each, while eight smaller prizes (one of which was always $3,000 cash) were behind two numbers each. The remaining two numbers hid "WIN" cards. The champion selected one number at a time and won the first prize he/she matched. If a "WIN" card was found, the champion won whatever prize he/she uncovered on the next pick. This was the only way to win the car or the $10,000 after any of a champion's first eight victories.

Prizes were removed from the board as the champion won them, but the two "WIN" cards were always available until the ninth victory. At this point, the cards were removed and two numbers were shown on the board, one for each of the prizes he/she had not yet won. The champion picked one number and received its prize, then won the other one by default after a tenth victory. Any champion who cleared the board of prizes could either keep them all and retire, or risk them to play an eleventh and final match. A victory awarded a $50,000 cash bonus, while a loss forfeited the prizes. Any champion who was defeated before winning 10 matches kept all prizes accumulated to that point.

Similar to the shopping format, any prizes remaining on the board were swapped out after every fifth show, with the exception of the $3,000 and $10,000 if they were still available.

===== Bonus Round #3: The Winner's Big Money Game =====
In December 1987, the show changed bonus rounds again and introduced a new round called the "Winner's Big Money Game". At the start of this round, the champion selected one of three envelopes, each containing a set of six-word puzzles that served as clues to a famous person, place, or thing. To win, the champion had to solve a set amount of them within a time limit. The limit was originally five puzzles in 25 seconds, later reduced to four in 20 seconds. The clock began when the first word of a puzzle was revealed and stopped when the champion hit a plunger and gave an answer. Passing was allowed, and the champion could continue playing after one wrong guess or failure to respond immediately upon hitting the plunger. A second such mistake ended the round immediately.

The Winner's Big Money Game had a series of eight prize levels. The first six levels were played for cash prizes that started at $5,000 and increased by $1,000 for each subsequent game the champion won, up to $10,000. The seventh level was played for a car, and any champion who failed to win it was forced to retire. Winning the car allowed the champion to return for one last match, with $50,000 available in the Winner's Big Money Game if he/she won.

== Personnel ==
Jim Perry hosted Sale of the Century from 1983 to 1989.

The 1969–1974 version began with Jack Kelly as host, who was replaced by Joe Garagiola in 1971. Bill Wendell, then on the staff of NBC, served as announcer for the entire 1969–1974 version. Madelyn Sanders, an African-American model, served as hostess for most of the run, along with several other female models.

The 1980s version was hosted by Jim Perry, who was initially joined by Sally Julian as co-host. Two months later, Lee Menning replaced her until December 28, 1984, when Summer Bartholomew joined the program and remained as co-host until the 1989 finale. Jay Stewart announced until his retirement in January 1988, when he was replaced by Don Morrow.

== Production information ==
=== Broadcast history ===
Sale of the Century premiered on September 29, 1969, on NBC's daytime schedule at 11:00 a.m. (10:00 a.m. Central), replacing the two-year-old Personality, which was hosted by Larry Blyden. It aired at that time slot for the whole of its initial four years on the network, the show eventually dominating the ratings against sitcom reruns on CBS, and local programming on ABC, eventually got its competition in form of the new game show Gambit on CBS in 1972, ending its first run on July 13, 1973, after which The Wizard of Odds—the first American program hosted by Alex Trebek—made its debut, due to Lin Bolen's incentive for a younger demographic. Shortly after NBC cancelled the daytime version of the program, it returned in first-run weekly syndication in September 1973, with the same format as in the final NBC weeks. However, relatively few stations took the program, which usually aired on a weeknight before primetime programming, and not enough of them were interested in a second season, so the New York-based production was discontinued in 1974.

The 1983 revival debuted on NBC on January 3 of that year at 10:30 a.m. (9:30 a.m. Central) and remained there until January 2, 1987. Replacing Wheel of Fortune, the show that belonged in the time slot from April 1982 to December 1982, the show faced competition against Child's Play at the same time slot on CBS (ABC did not begin programming until 11:00 a.m.) from January to September 1983, then Press Your Luck from September 1983 to January 1986, then Card Sharks (a revival of Jim Perry's former show) from January 1986 to 1987. On January 5, 1987, the network moved the show ahead thirty minutes to 10:00 a.m. (9:00 a.m. Central). Sale of the Century stayed in that timeslot for the remainder of its run, enjoying respectable ratings. It faced competition with three CBS game shows airing at that same timeslot: The $25,000 Pyramid (for the entirety of 1987 and the spring of 1988), Blackout (which aired from January to April 1988), and Family Feud (which premiered in July 1988); as the late 80's progressed, however, NBC affiliates began pre-empting desirable time slots, including the 10:00 am hour, to extend their local or syndicated program offerings. Eventually, the pre-emptions progressed to the point that daytime game shows were no longer considered viable. The program's 1,578th and final episode aired on March 24, 1989.

Its place on the schedule was taken by Reg Grundy stablemate Scrabble, which had been airing in the afternoons for several years, in a shuffle that also saw Super Password end after four-and-a-half seasons (its timeslot of 12:00 PM was given back to its affiliates, which had used the slot to air local newscasts at that point) and the soap opera Generations inherit Scrabble's old timeslot of 12:30 pm. (Note: With the advent of local or syndicated programming, however, still in the way, NBC returned the 10:00 am hour to its affiliates after both Wheel of Fortune and Classic Concentration ended their network runs on September 20, 1991.)

The revival series spawned an accompanying daily syndicated edition that premiered on January 7, 1985, and was distributed by Genesis Entertainment. The syndicated Sale of the Century was renewed for a second season but was cancelled approximately halfway through the year; the final first-run episode aired on March 21, 1986 and reruns continued until September 12, 1986.

=== Episode status ===
Most episodes of the original NBC 1969–1973 series are believed to have been destroyed, but nine episodes of that run are held by the UCLA Film and Television Archive. The status of the 1973–74 syndicated run is unknown.

The USA Network aired reruns of the entire 220-episode 1985–86 syndicated series, and 170 episodes (July 1988 – March 1989) of the NBC daytime series from September 14, 1992, to July 29, 1994, for a total of 390 episodes.

GSN carried the series from April 1, 2013, until March 27, 2015. The network initially started out by airing the final sixty-five episodes of the NBC series. As part of the weekend beginning with that year's Black Friday, the network aired a four-hour marathon of episodes from the first season of the syndicated series to pay tribute to many retailers offering sales. GSN added the syndicated episodes to its daytime lineup in place of the network episodes that Monday and aired most of the run before dropping Sale from their schedule.

On October 18, 2015, Buzzr added the syndicated episodes to their Sunday night lineup, which later moved to the weeknight lineup in the summer of 2017. In July 2018, the show moved to the weekday morning lineup, and in July 2019, the network added NBC episodes to its rotation, starting from episode 1410, in July 1988.

=== Theme music ===
The original 1969–1974 theme was composed by Al Howard and Irwin Bazelon.

The main theme on the 1980s version was composed in 1982 by Ray Ellis and his son, Marc, and was more or less a reworking of Jack Grimsley's original 1980 recording for the Australian version of the show. The show introduced a synthesized version of the Ellis theme in 1987.

== Licensed merchandise ==
Milton Bradley released two home editions based on the 1969–1974 version. A version based upon the 1983–1989 version of the show (made by American Publishing Corp and featuring the Quizzard game) was released in 1986.

As part of their "Game Show Greats" lineup, IGT released a video slot machine in 2003.

== International versions ==
Prior to purchasing the rights to Sale of the Century in 1980, media mogul Reg Grundy produced Great Temptation, a similar show that aired on Australian television from 1970 to 1974. His Australian version of Sale of the Century ran from 1980 to 2001. Reg Grundy Productions distributed the format internationally until 1995 when the company was sold to Pearson Television, which became known as Fremantle in 2001.

Country	Name	Host(s)	TV station	Premiere	Finale
Australia	Great Temptation	Tony Barber and Barbara Rodgers	Seven Network	1970	1974
Australia	Sale of the Century	Tony Barber	Nine Network	July 14, 1980	November 29, 2001
Australia	Sale of the Century	Glenn Ridge	Nine Network	July 14, 1980	November 29, 2001
Australia	Temptation	Ed Phillips and Livinia Nixon	Nine Network	May 30, 2005	January 23, 2009
Brazil	Só Compra Quem Quer	Silvio Santos	SBT	late 1960s	mid-1970s
Brazil	Tentação	Silvio Santos	SBT	October 9, 1994; March 4, 2007	April 7, 2002; May 3, 2009
Greece	Aφεvτικό Tρελάθηκε; Afentikó Treláthike		Star Channel	1994	1995
Greece	Η αγоρά τоυ αιώvα I agorá tou aióna	Mary Miliaresi	Mega Channel	1997	1998
Germany	Hopp oder Top	Andreas Similia	Tele 5	1990	1993
Germany	Hopp oder Top	Thomas Aigner	Tele 5	1990	1993
Germany	Hopp oder Top	Hermann Toelcke	DSF	1990	1993
Hong Kong	大手筆; Daai Sau Bat	Wong Dick-Thung	ATV	1982	1982
India	Super Sale	Sajid Khan	STAR One	2005	2005
Indonesia	Super Sale Indonesia	Gilang Dirga	SCTV	September 29, 2025	October 17, 2025
Mexico	La Venta Increible	Guillermo Huesca and Anette Cuburu	TV Azteca	1998	1998
New Zealand	Sale of the Century	Steve Parr	Network Two	April 3, 1989	July 28, 1989
New Zealand	Sale of the Century	Steve Parr	TV One	July 31, 1989	June 18, 1993
New Zealand	Sale of the Century	Steve Parr	TV3	September 5, 1994	April 13, 1995
Nigeria	Temptation: Nigeria	Ikponmwosa "Ik" Osakioduwa	M-Net	2006	2006
Paraguay	La Venta del Siglo	Néstor Povigna and Mariza Mountti	SNT	June 30, 1995	December 23, 1998
South Africa	Flinkdink	Edwill van Aarde	SABC	1977	1980s
South Africa	Temptation: South Africa	James Lennox	M-Net	2006	2006
Turkey	Yüzyilin Indirimi	Mehmet Aslantug	Kanal D	1995	1997
Turkey	Yüzyilin Indirimi	Mehmet Aslantug	Star TV	1998	1998
United Kingdom	Sale of the Century	Nicholas Parsons	ITV	October 9, 1971	November 6, 1983
United Kingdom	Sale of the Century	Peter Marshall and Maria Rice Mundy	Sky Channel	February 6, 1989	October 3, 1991
United Kingdom	Sale of the Century	Keith Chegwin	Challenge TV	February 3, 1997	1998

== See also ==
- Temptation (2007 American game show)
