= Victoria Nicolls =

Australian actress and television personality

- Born: February 1954 (age 72); Malta
- Occupations: Actress, television personality
- Years active: 1977–2003

Victoria Nicolls (born February 1954), often misspelt as Victoria Nicholls, is an Australian former actress and television personality, she was also briefly a vocalist.

== Biography and career ==
Nicolls was born in Malta, is well remembered by viewers for appearing in the Australian game show Sale of the Century as the original co-host opposite Tony Barber from 1980 to 1982.

She is also noted for her dramatic roles on television, such as Raeleen Archer in The Restless Years in the late 1970s, and as officer Heather Rodgers in Prisoner in 1984. In 1995 she was a leading cast member of the soap opera Echo Point.

== Discography ==
=== Studio albums ===
Title	Album details
Frizzle Frazzle Frozzle	Released: 1981; Format: LP; Label: K-tel (NA589)

=== Singles ===
List of singles, with Australian chart positions
Year	Title	Peak chart positions
Year	Title	AUS
1979	"Midnite Rendezvous"	57

== Filmography ==
Film & television
Year	Title	Role	Notes
1977–1980	The Restless Years	Raelene Geddes	Seasons 1–3 (main role, 112 episodes)
1978	Temperament Unsuited	Karen	Short film
1979	The Journalist	Phillipa Richards	Feature film
1983	Pretty Petrol	Lucy James	Television film
1984	Prisoner	Heather Rodgers	Season 6 (recurring role, 24 episodes)
1990	Family and Friends	(unknown role)	Season 1
1994	Blue Heelers	Wendy Ruhl	Season 1, Episode 17
1995	Echo Point	Trish Loman	Season 1 (main role, 130 episodes)
1996	English: Have a Go	Claire Jones	Educational series
2000	Blue Heelers	Tricia Quinn	Season 7, Episode 7
2000	Something in the Air	Chris Folsen	Season 1, Episode 86
2003	MDA	Meredith Cooper	Season 2, Episode 7

Self appearances
Year	Title	Role	Notes
1979	Countdown	Performer (singing "Midnite Rendezvous")	TV series, 1 episode
1980	Mardi Gras	Mardi Gras	Herself as Presenter
1980	Telethon '80	Herself & Tony Barber	1979
1980	Simon Townsend's Wonder World	Guest	1 episode
1982	The Daryl Somers Show	Guest	TV series, 2 episodes
1980–1982	Sale of the Century	Hostess	TV series
1983	Telethon, South Australia 1983	Guest	TV special
1986	Kids 21st Birthday Channel Ten Telethon	Guest	TV special
1988	Hey Hey It's Saturday	Herself	TV series, 1 episode ("Red Faces" segment)
1989	The Bert Newton Show	Guest (with Jane Clifton & Julie Adams)	TV series, 1 episode
1991	Celebrity Family Feud	Contestant (with Debbie Newsome, Barbie Rogers & Ena Harwood)	TV series, 1 episode: "Hosts v Hostesses"
1996	English: Have a Go	Herself	TV series
1998; 1999	Denise	Guest	TV series, 2 episodes
1999	Fox Studios Australia: The Grand Opening	Herself	TV special
2002	The Best of Aussie Cop Shows	Herself	TV special
2007	Where Are They Now?	Guest (with John Burgess, Barbie Rogers, Rosemary Margan)	TV series, 1 episode
