= Great Temptation =

Australian game show

- Also known as: The $25,000 Great Temptation
- Genre: Game Show
- Presented by: Tony Barber (Host); Barbara Rogers (co-host)
- Announcer: Max Rowley
- Country of origin: Australia
- Original language: English

Production
- Production locations: Adelaide, South Australia; Melbourne, Victoria
- Running time: 30 minutes
- Production company: Grundy Productions

Original release
- Network: Seven Network
- Release: June 1, 1970 – 1974

Related
- Sale of the Century

Great Temptation is an Australian game show, produced by Reg Grundy Productions Pty. Ltd., that aired on the Seven Network from 1970 until 1974. It was hosted by Tony Barber and co-hosted by Barbara Rogers.

In addition to the daytime series known simply as (New World) Temptation, a prime time version titled $25,000 Great Temptation premiered on 5 July 1971. It initially aired once a week, but later expanded to airing twice a week in 1972 and five nights a week in 1973 and 1974.

Reg Grundy was inspired by the original Sale of the Century that first aired in the United States in 1969, but he did not gain full rights to produce his own Australian version of Sale until 1980, which ran for 21 years. The similar format of Great Temptation was a quiz with three contestants who gained a dollar amount for each correct answer. At regular times during the show, the leading contestant was able to "buy" a valuable prize for a small nominal amount that was deducted from their score. That prize remained theirs regardless of their success on the show. The winner of each episode was able to return the next day or take a major prize and leave. The major prizes at the end of each show accumulated but were lost if the contestant was beaten on a subsequent show.

For much of its production run Great Temptation, along with Temptation, was filmed at the Mobbs Lane studios of Channel 7 in Sydney. Questions for both shows were written by George Black who had been a very successful contestant, and later a question writer, for Bob Dyer's Pick A Box, which was replaced by Great Temptation in the Monday evening timeslot when Dyer's long running show came to an end in 1971.

Contestants who won all the prizes on Great Temptation included Rona Collings, a doyenne of Australian quiz shows since radio days, and Fran Powell who later served as a question writer and adjudicator for Sale of The Century. Both had earlier appeared on the daytime Temptation show.

According to Barber, a contestant died onstage during the taping of a 1970s episode of Great Temptation. Barber congratulated her on winning the game; she then slumped over and the production staff cleared the studio and called paramedics. That episode was not broadcast.

"No one was very sure at first because she'd actually won the game. I said: 'Congratulations Valerie, you've won!' and she slopped. There was a bit of confusion; we cleared the studio and the doctors were called. I said 'how is she? She seems passed out,' and he said: 'Tony, she's passed on.' It was awful and very upsetting for everyone there."

— Tony Barber

The first jackpot-winning show was photographed by Ron Wormwell. Ron, a semi-professional photographer, was then-husband of Channel 7 Adelaide Publicist, Judy, and often called upon at short notice to capture publicity stills.
