= Sale of the Century (Australian game show) =

- Also known as: Sale of the New Century (2000)
- Genre: Game show
- Created by: Al Howard
- Directed by: Garry Dunstan; Terry Higgins; Dennis Rawady; Tony Skinner; Peter Ots; Craig Coster; Gayle Trippett; Adrian Dellevergin; Graeme Sutcliffe
- Presented by: Tony Barber; Glenn Ridge; Victoria Nicolls; Delvene Delaney; Alyce Platt; Jo Bailey; Nicky Buckley; Karina Brown
- Announcer: Ron Neate; Pete Smith
- Theme music composer: Jack Grimsley
- Country of origin: Australia
- Original language: English
- No. of seasons: 22
- No. of episodes: 4,610

Production
- Executive producers: Bill Mason; Andrew Brooke; Martin Rhodes; Michael Whyte; Karen Greene
- Producers: Jim Burnett; Lisa Chatfield; Pam Barnes; Michelle Seers; Steve Marshall; Suzanne Stark; Karen Bentley
- Production locations: GTV-9 studios, Richmond, Melbourne, Victoria
- Running time: 30 minutes
- Production company: Grundy Productions

Original release
- Network: Nine Network
- Release: 14 July 1980 – 29 November 2001

Related
- Great Temptation; Temptation; Sale of the Century

Sale of the Century (stylised as $ale of the Century) is an Australian prime time game show that aired on the Nine Network from 14 July 1980 to 29 November 2001. It is based on both Great Temptation that aired from 1970 to 1974 and on the original Sale that first aired in the United States from 1969 to 1973. The Australian format of Sale has since been used internationally, including in a revived US version that aired from 1983 to 1989.

Tony Barber, the host of Great Temptation, was also the initial host of Sale for over a decade before being replaced by Glenn Ridge in 1991. Hostesses over the years have included Victoria Nicolls, Delvene Delaney, Alyce Platt, Jo Bailey, Nicky Buckley and Karina Brown. Pete Smith was Sale's announcer for the majority of its run. Ron Neate was announcer for only the first ten episodes in 1980 before Smith took over.

From 30 May 2005 to 23 January 2009, the series was revived under its original Australian title, Temptation.

== Gameplay ==
The game usually involves three contestants competing to amass the highest score by answering questions correctly and playing several games. The champion from the previous episode will usually be invited to return as a carry-over champion.

Each contestant is given $20 to start. The host reads a trivia question to the contestants. The first to press a buzzer gets an opportunity to answer the question, interrupting the host if in the middle of reading the question. Players' scores increase by $5 for each correct answer and decrease by $5 for each incorrect answer. If a player answers incorrectly, the correct answer is revealed and the game goes on to the next question, as only one player can try to answer each question.

=== Gift Shop ===
At the end of each of the first two rounds (and in early years, also at the end of the third round), the highest-scoring player gets to go to a "Gift Shop" and is offered the chance to sacrifice part of their score to "purchase" a prize at a "low price". The prizes, and the cost, increased in each round, usually around $5–7 in round 1, then $7–10 in round 2, and $10–16 in round 3. Contestants were allowed to haggle with the host, who, depending on the game situation, might reduce the price and offer inducements including actual cash in order to entice the contestant to purchase. If two or more players had the same score at this point, a Dutch auction was conducted for the prize whereby the host would incrementally reduce the selling price until either contestant buzzed in or the host decided not to lower the prize any further and announced "no sale".

Some gift shops also included a bonus prize called a "Sale Surprise", revealed only after the conclusion of the gift shop (whether the contestant bought the prize or not).

=== Cashbox/Cash Card ===
In 1986, along with the debut of the new theme and set as well as co-host Platt, the third Gift Shop prize was replaced by these two mini-games, giving players an opportunity to win some cash, an extra prize, or earn extra score money:

==== Cashbox ====
The player in the lead (or by auction if there was a tie) would be given the opportunity to play for a cash jackpot, which started at $2,000 and increased by $1,000 every day until it was won. To play, they would have to give up his/her lead over the second-place competitor. If the contestant opted to play, they selected one of three boxes. One box contained the jackpot while the other boxes contained cash prizes of $100 and $200.

This was later adopted in America as "Instant Cash"

==== Cash Card ====
In 1989, as part of a format revamp—which also included the introduction of audio-visual questions, a 30-second "Fast Money" speed round, an extra "Fame Game" in the third round (later removed in 1992), and the shopping round replaced by the "Winner's Board"—the Cashbox was replaced with the "Cash Card," an opportunity for the leading contestant to either win a cash prize equivalent to perhaps a month's average wages for a middle-class Australian at the time, earn the opportunity to win a car later in the game (see section on major prizes), receive the score they sacrificed back, or reduce the score of a competitor slightly. This cost a player $15 to play.

Four playing cards (the Aces of each suit) were presented; the player selected one, and it was turned over to reveal one of four elements:

- "$15": Gave the player the money back.
- "Joker": worth a "booby prize"; essentially a worthless card.
- "Prize": A bonus prize, usually worth between $2,000 and $3,000.
- "Cash Card": A growing jackpot that began at $5,000 and increased by $1,000 each night it was not won.

For the first three years of this format, if the leading player opted not to go for the Cash Card, the second-place player was then offered that chance, but the jackpot card was removed from the lineup. In the event of a tie-breaker between the second- and third-place contestants, a general knowledge question was asked, and the first person with the correct answer played. This option was discontinued in 1992.

In 1992, two significant changes were made to the Cash Card: The Cash Card jackpot itself was fixed at $5,000, but occasionally was worth $10,000; and the "Joker" was replaced with the "Take $5" card, which allowed the player to remove $5 from one of their opponents' scores.

Two years later, in keeping with the "casino" theme, the playing cards were replaced with four single-reeled poker machines also displaying each card suit. Each one was rigged to land on one element, and when the player selected a suit, the co-host pulled the handle to reveal the outcome. In addition, the "Take $5" was relegated to celebrity specials, and replaced on the regular shows with a machine displaying the manufacturer's logo of the car on offer that week. If the player selects this machine, then goes on to win the game, the car is placed on the Winner's Board (see below).

=== Fame Game ===
A longer-format question usually starting with "Who am I?" or "What is my name?" depending on the subject of the question was asked once in each of the three rounds. Here, a succession of increasingly larger clues were given to the identity of a famous person, place, or event. In this round, players could buzz in and answer at any time, without penalty for an incorrect answer. However, each player only had one chance to answer.

If one of the players buzzed in and answered correctly, they had an opportunity to play the "famous faces" sub-game, where they would choose from a game board with nine photos of celebrities, occasionally locations, and from 1987, a featured home viewer. (On The $25,000 Great Temptation, the board featured six celebrity photos.) Once chosen, the face selected would be spun around to reveal either a relatively small prize (typically appliances or furniture valued at around a weekly wage) or a $25 money card, which awarded $25 to the player's score.

By 1984, additional $10 and $15 money cards were added to the game board, with the $10 available at the outset, the $15 added at the second Fame Game, and the $25 at the third. By 1986, the final Fame Game featured a "wild card," which offered the choice of $1,000 in cash or a chance to pick again. From 1989 to 1992, a fourth game was added with two $5 questions separating the first two Fame Games and $20 card added in the third Fame Game and the $25 card added in the fourth. The $20 card was removed in 1992.

=== Speed Round (Fast Money) ===
Originally, after the third Fame Game, three more general knowledge questions were asked, and the contestant with the highest score is the winner. (In the first episode, however, only one general knowledge question was asked.) Around 1983, it was replaced with a speed round, where the host would ask questions in a particularly rapid-fire manner, attempting to fit in as many questions as possible in a 60-second time limit. It is also sometimes referred to as the "Mad Minute" due to the speed round's fast pace.

Starting in 1989, as part of the aforementioned format revamp, the second Fame Game was followed by a few more questions and a shorter 30-second speed round before the second Gift Shop offer; the final speed round was initially reduced to 30 seconds, but restored to 60 seconds by 1990. Most of the more successful players proved themselves particularly adept at this section.

On 12 November 1986, part-time taxi driver David Poltorak achieved the highest front game score on the Australian version – $200 – and consequently won the total endgame prize pool on offer (totalling a then-record $376,200).

As far as a front game score, a close second may belong to a man named Ian, who in 1985 won a game with a score of $170. Virginia Noel, who won a game in 1983 with a score of $155 while not letting her opponents answer any questions during Fast Money may hold third. (Ultimately, David Poltorak's record would be beaten in 1994 by Dean Sole on the New Zealand version of "Sale of the Century", his single-game score on 14 November 1994 being $201.)

The winner of the game was the person with the most money at the end. If there was a final tie, the tied players answered a tiebreaker "Who am I?" question, where a correct answer from either contestant won the game, while an incorrect answer defeated the contestant in favor of his or her opponent.

== Sale of the New Century ==
In a bid to combat declining ratings, the show was renamed Sale of the New Century in 2000. The format was also altered slightly to include four contestants per night in an elimination format; after each of the last two Fame Games, the lowest scorer would be eliminated. Any players tied for last place would be asked a Fame-Game-style question.

In addition, the second set of questions prior to the first Fame Game included a "Brain Drain" question. The initial value of $20 reduced by $5 every 10 seconds. In 2000, Brain Drain questions had the question stop after time for the $5 score ran out; later questions had the timer freeze after 30 seconds at $5 for the remainder of the entire question.

The individual Cash Card poker machines were replaced by single touch-screen video poker machine; the co-host touched a suit, then hit a button to spin the "reels". In addition, the "Prize" was replaced with "Take $5". Also, contestants who win "all the way" then compete in a "best of three" play-off entitled "Super Sale." The first two contestants to win since the format change played against each other to win the same amount of cash as the latter contestant's cash jackpot. After this, the "reigning champ" plays against the next Grand Champion to win "all the way" for a cash amount equal to their jackpot prize.

The "New" was dropped from the title in 2001, and the show returned to a three contestant format, but continued to eliminate the low scorer before the final fast money.

== Bonus Games ==
The show went through two bonus games during its 21-year run:

=== Shopping format ===
A series of six (seven at first) prizes was offered, culminating in one or sometimes two luxury cars. The sale prices for the prizes on the first episode started at $55 and increased to $530 for the car. A contestant could take his or her cumulative winnings, buy a prize, and retire, or elect to return the next day and try to win enough to buy the next most expensive prize. Any champion who earned enough cash to buy the car could leave with the car or return to play for all six prizes.

Starting in mid-to-late 1982, any champion who earned enough cash for the car had the opportunity to play for a large cash jackpot for $620. Later, they could purchase all of the prizes for $605 and all of the prizes plus the cash jackpot (the "lot") for $700. The jackpot started at $50,000 and increased by $2,000 per night until somebody won it. The largest jackpot ever won was $508,000.

=== Winner's Board ===
In 1989, also as part of the aforementioned format revamp, the shopping round was replaced with a game called the "Winner's Board" (based on the Winner's Board used on the American version from 1984 to 1987). The contestant would face a 12-space board. The Winner's Board contained six prizes on 12 cards—five pairs of matching cards, one "WIN" card (if picked, the next number selected resulted in an automatic match), and one "CAR" card. The contestant called off numbers and the first prize matched is the first prize won, but in order to win the car, the player must select the "WIN" card first before selecting a number that has the "CAR" card.

In 1992, coinciding with the aforementioned removal of the extra Fame Game and subsequent $20 money card in round three, the "WIN" and "CAR" cards were replaced by another prize; as mentioned above, if a player had a winning score of $100 or more or starting in 1994, then picked the "car space" in the Cash Card, the "WIN" and "CAR" cards were placed on the board. If a champion clears the board, but did not complete either of the aforementioned tasks, their next game is for the car.

After a player made a match, they faced a decision: either leave with all the prizes earned off the board, or risk them and play another show. A loss cost the player all of their prizes from the board, while clearing the board and winning one more game (which took seven, later eight, episodes to achieve) earned them the cash jackpot.

== Tournaments ==
In 1985, the Australian/American challenge aired featuring the biggest winners from the Australian version competing against the biggest winners from the American version for $100,000. The first week consisted of 12 Australian champions playing against each other, three at a time, where the four winners of each heat compete on the Friday show to determine the two representatives for that country. The same was done during the second week with 12 American champions. The third week was a "best of 5" playoff where the first team that won three games won $100,000. The Australian team (consisting of Virginia Noel and Fran Powell) beat the American team (consisting of Frances Wolfe and Alice Conkright) winning three straight games.

In 1986, the Ashes series aired which followed the same format as the previous year's Australian/American challenge but featuring the biggest winners from the Australian version competing against the biggest winners from the British version again for $100,000. Again, the Australian team (consisting of David Bock and Cary Young) beat the British team (consisting of Daphne Fowler and Susan Kaye) also winning three straight games.

Later that year, the Commonwealth Games aired featuring contestants from Australia, Canada, and New Zealand competing against each other which was won by Cary Young.

In 1987, 1988, and 1989, three World Championship series aired featuring champions from Australia, New Zealand, the United States, and the United Kingdom competing against each other. Cary Young won the 1987 series (representing Australia), David Bock won the 1988 series (also representing Australia), and Brian MacDonnell won the 1989 series (representing New Zealand).

In 1987, 1988 and 1989, three Student Championship series aired featuring Year 12 students from across Australia competing against each other.

In 1990, Young, Bock, and MacDonnell competed against each other in the Masters series, which was won by Young.

Additionally, the US version held their own "International Tournament" in 1987, which was played between the top winners from said country, Canada and Australia; the grand champion was none other than aforementioned three-time defending Australian champ Cary Young.

== Celebrity Weeks ==
Starting in 1990, occasional weeks were set aside for celebrities to play the game. Each week consists of sixteen celebrities playing over four days. The four winners from those shows meet in a two-day final, in which the celebrity with the highest score over those two days wins the competition.

Featured stars included the cast members of The Sullivans, The Young Doctors, Prisoner, and A Country Practice. Each celebrity plays for a home viewer, who wins all cash and prizes earned during the show. The ultimate winner's home viewer also wins an extra prize, usually a car.

== Top 10 Grand Champions ==
Rank	Name	Amount Won	Year or Date
1	Robert Kusmierski	$676,790	1 June 1992
2	Kate Buckingham	$471,640	15 October 1990
3	Simon Fallon	$434,065	21 February 2001
4	Sandra Oxley	$421,080	27 March 1997
5	Tom Beck	$420,573	31 May 2000
6	Richard Hitesman	$382,341	1993
7	David Poltorak	$376,104	12 November 1986
8	Peter McMillan	$372,538	
9	Cameron Burge	$360,844	1 August 1995
10	Andrew Yeend	$357,889	8 July 1999

Other notable wins include:

- Vincent Smith of Sale, Victoria, the first champion to win the lot (before the cash jackpot) with $73,099. In 1985, he would author The Great Australian Trivia Quiz Book.
- Cary Young, who won $78,606 in 1982 and went on to win the 1987 World Championship.
- Hayward Maberley, who won $343,536 in cash and prizes (including a $206,000 cash jackpot, possibly a then-record) in 1983.
- Chris Walker of Maldon, Victoria, was the youngest-ever winner, aged 16.

== Statistics ==
- Highest number of questions answered correctly in one episode: David Poltorak, in episode #1443—35 out of 55.
- Highest number of questions answered correctly and consecutively: Virginia Noel in episode #0851—14 out of 14.
- In episode #0376, a contestant answered only one question correctly all night, and still won.
- The youngest person to win the lot was 16-year-old Andrew Werbik in episode #1493.
- Lowest winning score: $20 in episode #0030.
- Highest winning score (under normal episode circumstances): $200 by David Poltorak in episode #1443. (This does not include tournament episodes where scores over consecutive episodes exceeded $200.)
- Number of times a contestant has won a car on their first night: 13.
- Largest cash jackpot: $508,000 to Robert Kusmierski.
- Youngest contestants: 15-year-old Justin Ford (Victoria), who appeared over four nights on episodes #0129 to #0132; also 15-year-old Sue Yap (NSW) who appeared in early 1991 episodes
- Most number of questions answered correctly in 60-second fast money: David Poltorak, episode #1443
- The only contestant to have answered all the round one questions correctly is Leesa Selke.
- The only International team ever to beat Australia on home soil: Paul Moran and Adrian Davies of England, The Ashes 1993 series, episode 2821
- Total cash and prizes given away at end 2001: $60,692,993, consisting of $16,343,619 in cash and $44,349,374 in prizes — including over 350 cars.

== Theme music ==
The theme music was written by Jack Grimsley and was later remixed three times, once in 1986, again in 1989, and finally in 2000.

== Merchandise ==
=== Board Games ===
Five editions of the Sale of the Century home game featuring the Quizzard system (like the 1986 American version by American Publishing Corp.) were released by Crown & Andrews.

=== PC CD-Rom Game ===
A PC CD-ROM game of Sale of the Century was released by Roadshow Interactive, featuring Glenn Ridge and Nicky Buckley on the cover (although they do not provide their own voices in the game). It featured a set of four colorful multiplayer buzzers called "The Slammer", as they were allowed to be connected to a joystick port into a computer.

=== Giveaway ===
During episodes of Sale from 1997 to 1998, losing contestants had an opportunity to choose from either the board game or the CD-ROM game as a consolation prize, in addition to the stick pin.

== Possible revamp ==
In July 2018, it was rumoured that Network Ten had plans to bring back a brand "new-look" version of Sale of the Century for their network. According to an article from TV Tonight, it says that "Ten has been readying to provide studio space at Pyrmont for Fremantle to pilot the game show". As of 2020, this has not been confirmed.

== See also ==
- List of longest-running Australian television series
- Million Dollar Minute
- Great Temptation
- Temptation
