= Jim Ball (radio personality) =

Australian radio personality

- Presenting career
- Station: 2UE
- Network: Macquarie Radio Network
- Time slot: Midnight to Dawn
- Station: 2GB / MTR 1377
- Network: Macquarie Radio Network
- Time slot: Midnight to dawn
- Style: Talk show
- Country: Australia

Jim Ball is an Australian radio personality, formerly broadcasting with the 2GB and 2UE networks in Sydney.

== Biography ==
Ball's program typically consists of him discussing various issues (especially current events, politics and history) with callers. Ball is frank and does not shy away from politically incorrect topics. Like most radio announcers on the AM band in Sydney, Ball is politically conservative; he claims to represent traditional Australian values. According to Ball, the major threats to these values are a naive and uninformed view of Islam by many Australians (including the media), apathy and political correctness. Ball is also a staunch critic of multiculturalism and says that immigrants to Australia should be encouraged to integrate into mainstream Australia and accept "core Australian values".

Ball began on 2GB in 1999 and constantly won the ratings in the midnight to dawn shift. On 7 March 2008 Ball announced to his audience his resignation from 2GB and was replaced by David Oldfield. Ball took over 2UE's midnight to dawn program "New Day Australia" on 17 March, replacing Clive Robertson. On 12 March 2010, Ball unexpectedly resigned from 2UE and returned to 2GB on 12 April replacing Oldfield.

In 2004, Ball walked the Kokoda Track in Papua New Guinea.

In 2005, he was featured on ABC TV's Media Watch regarding comments he made about a fictional school.

In January 2011, Ball resigned from 2GB and MTR 1377.

=== Political career ===
In April 2016 Ball announced he would contest the seat of Mackellar at the 2016 federal election, on a conservative independent platform. Ball's announcement followed the Liberal Party's endorsement of Jason Falinski, a former activist for Australian republicanism and critic of the Howard government's policies on asylum seekers, describing them as "inhumane". Falinski defeated Bronwyn Bishop in the Liberal preselection contest.
