= Melbourne Talk Radio =

- Rowville, Victoria, Australia; Australia
- Broadcast area: Melbourne RA1
- Frequency: 1377 kHz AM
- Branding: MTR 1377

Programming
- Format: Conservative talk
- Affiliations: Macquarie Radio Network

Ownership
- Owner: Pacific Star Network (50%) Macquarie Radio Network (50%); (Melbourne Radio Operations Pty Ltd)
- Sister stations: 1116 SEN; MyMP Digital

History
- First air date: 19 April 2010
- Last air date: 2 March 2012
- Call sign meaning: see 3MP

Technical information
- Power: 5 kW
- Transmitter coordinates: 37.9347°S 145.2166°E

Melbourne Talk Radio (callsign 3MP) was a radio station in Melbourne that commenced broadcasting on 19 April 2010 until its closure on 2 March 2012. It replaced, and was later succeeded by, 3MP, which used the 1377 kHz frequency. The station's transmitter is located in the suburb of Rowville and broadcasts at 5 kW.

== History ==
In December 2009, existing operator Pacific Star Network and Macquarie Radio Network, the owner of top rating Sydney talkback radio station 2GB, agreed to create the joint-venture "Melbourne Radio Operations Pty Ltd", to supply radio programming in the Melbourne market. In April 2010, the two signed an interim agreement to launch conservative talkback station MTR 1377—replacing 3MP on AM radio—to compete against incumbent 3AW.

At the station's launch on 7 April 2010, breakfast presenter and Program Director Steve Price promised the station would be "in your face, controversial, opinionated". Despite or because of this promise, the station failed to attract a stable audience, from its Station Identity Letters becoming universally referred to as "Men Talking Rubbish".

The station's office was in Swan Street, Richmond, in the same location as its sister station, sports-focused SEN.

After ceasing operations, its management claimed it had had little chance of succeeding due to operations being hampered by the station having a low bandwidth and therefore its signal not being able to be received by those living in the outer suburbs of Melbourne. The true reason though for MTR's failure was that its founders had overestimated the potential audience number for its station.

== Closure ==
In November 2011, MTR was threatened with closure due to several issues, both ratings and legally related. The station's ratings were much lower than anticipated and litigation is underway relating to program syndication from Sydney's 2GB. Russell Tate, CEO of Macquarie Radio Network which half owns the station, wanted the station to have a cheaper management and staff structure.

The station lost $6.2 million in the first twelve months of operation.

In February 2012 Macquarie Radio Network began legal action against Pacific Star after the board failed to approve a budget for the station.

In March 2012, part owner, Macquarie Radio Network issued a notice of default to MTR and Pacific Star Network demanding full payment of all monies owing. The station was closed and placed into administration on Friday 2 March at 5pm. The original station that moved to digital only as 3MP MyMP when MTR began broadcasting, reoccupied the 1377 frequency.

== Former Presenters ==
- Breakfast with Steve Price
- Mornings with Steve Vizard
- Afternoons with Chris Smith (∞)
- Drive with Martin King.
- Money News with Ross Greenwood (∞)
- Nights with Brian Wilshire (∞)
- Australia Overnight with Michael McLaren (∞)
- Wake Up Australia with Andrew Moore (Mon–Wed) & Luke Bona (Thurs & Fri) (∞)

(∞) Aired also on 2GB in Sydney.

- Diana Simons Melbourne radio broadcaster.
- Jim Ball
- Martin King
- Glenn Ridge

== News ==
MTR 1377 broadcast 2GB's Macquarie National News from Sydney.

The former Melbourne based newsroom was sacked in early December 2011 as part of a "cost-cutting" measure.
