= Tony Barber =

Australian television presenter (born 1940)

Tony Barber OAM
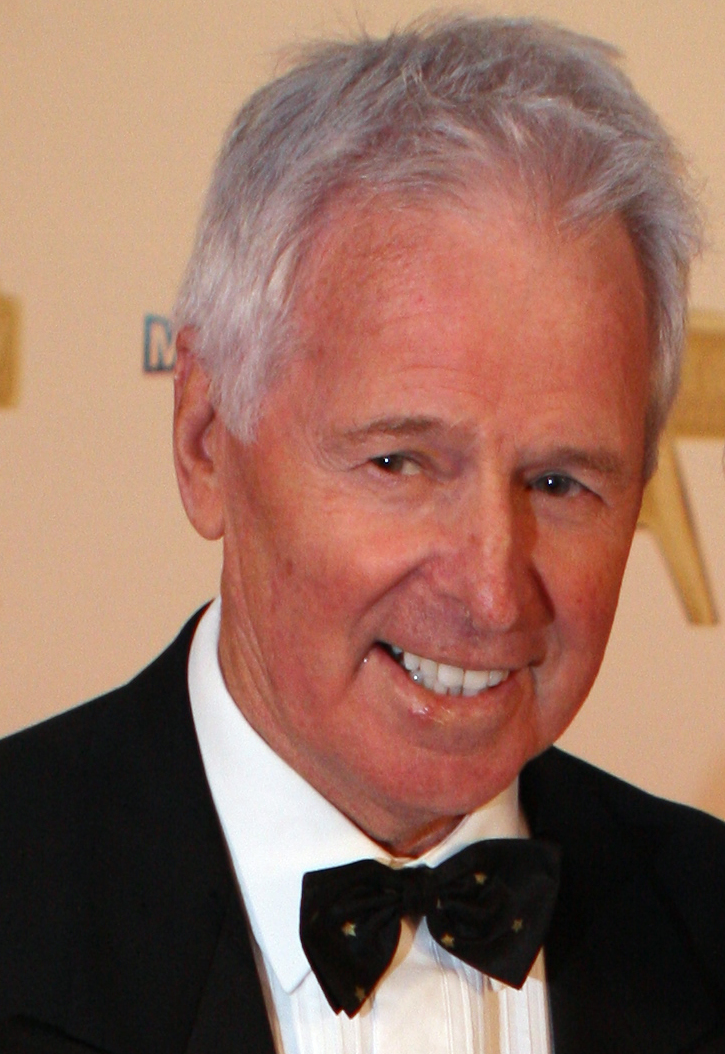
- Barber in 2011
- Born: Anthony Ferraro Louis Barber; 28 March 1940 (age 86); Oldham, England, United Kingdom
- Occupations: Television presenter; radio announcer; singer; former advertising executive
- Years active: 1961−present
- Known for: Host of Great Temptation, Sale of the Century and Wheel of Fortune
- Spouses: Helen Barber (deceased); Kristine Barber
- Children: Kelly, Jacqueline

Anthony Ferraro Louis Barber OAM (born 28 March 1940) is a British Australian Gold Logie award-winning television game show host, radio announcer, singer and media personality, who has been active in the industry since the early 1960s.

== Biography ==
=== Early life ===
Barber was born in Oldham, England in March 1940. He has said that he "owes much of his enthusiastic and driving personality to a loving Irish grandma and a whole street full of aunts who kept the spirits high during the dark years of World War II." He moved with his family to Australia in 1947 and was educated by the Sisters of Mercy and the Irish Christian Brothers.

He attended Britannia Royal Naval College in Dartmouth, graduating in 1960.

In his own words:

"The Sisters of so-called Mercy taught me to sing & dance, the brothers taught me to bob & weave. The navy taught me to play rugby."

== Radio ==
Barber started his media career in 1961, as a cadet announcer at radio station 6GE in Geraldton, Western Australia.

By the end of 1962, Barber was a leading radio announcer in Perth, as well as the star of a weekly floor show at the Charles Hotel and another twice-weekly event at the Lido Coral Room where he performed impressions of Johnny Mathis and Paul Anka. Before leaving Western Australia for New South Wales he also appeared in a number of plays with the Scarborough players.

After moving to Sydney, Barber appeared at numerous hotel talent quests, a regular role as resident compere and vocalist at the Spellsons nitery in Pitt Street. This was in addition to holding down a regular job as an advertising executive, where at one point he cast himself as the "Cambridge Whistler", a central character in a 1960s cigarette commercial which brought him national recognition.

== Television presenter ==
It was at this point that the then head of the Seven Network, Bruce Gyngell, spotted Barber and was understood to have liked what he saw and suggested that he host a Reg Grundy show.

While Barber is more noted for his role as host of Sale of the Century, his origins in television date back to the early 1970s when he hosted the then popular Seven Network game show The $25,000 Great Temptation. The show was successful enough for the network that both daytime and prime time editions of the show were screened.

The show only faltered when in 1974, Seven decided to move the show from its 7:00 pm timeslot to the later 8:30 pm timeslot in an effort to attract viewers away from the then popular series Number 96 screening on the 0-10 Networks. Number 96 won the ratings battle and The $25,000 Great Temptation aired its last show in 1975. Barber then hosted the Australian version of Family Feud on the Nine Network from 1977 until 1979.

In 1980, the Reg Grundy Organisation, on the advice of its founder and producer, Reg Grundy, decided to revive the $25,000 Great Temptation format using the original international title, Sale of the Century. Screened nationally on the Nine Network, Barber hosted the show from 1980 until 1991, supported by a roster of co-hosts during his time including Victoria Nicolls (1980–82), Delvene Delaney (1982–85) and Alyce Platt (1986–91). Barber decided to leave the show in 1991 after being offered only a 12-month contract renewal period instead of his usual three-year deal; Platt left at the same time, he was replaced by Glenn Ridge as host, with co-host Jo Bailey.

Barber went on to host the short-lived Australian version of Jeopardy! on Network 10 in 1993. It has been said that its failure was partly due to placing it in the 6:00 pm timeslot against high-rating news bulletins of the day. Barber later stated in an interview that Jeopardy! was his favourite of all the game shows he hosted in his career. After Jeopardy, Barber succeeded John Burgess as host of Wheel of Fortune on the Seven Network in July 1996 following the show's relocation from Adelaide to Sydney as part of an attempted revamp. Also part of the revamp, in an attempt to win viewers back, the theme music that had been introduced the previous year was reinstated, the new set underwent minor changes and the former prize shop was reincarnated to an extent – contestants upon solving a puzzle were offered three prizes and one had to be selected. By the end of 1996, these changes together with the loss of the familiar Burgess as host resulted in poor viewing figures, and Barber decided to leave the show. Barber appeared at the beginning of the 1997 series premiere to hand the show over to Rob Elliott. During his time on TV, Barber estimates that he has hosted over 8,500 individual episodes of successful Grundy games.

He hosted a small competition on the Australian Cable TV network Foxtel seven nights a week called TV1's Cash Trivia Challenge. On 14 March 2007, he returned to his roots, making an appearance as guest host on Temptation, alongside his former co-host Alyce Platt, during the Battle of the Network Shows series where the original hosts, Ed Phillips and Livinia Nixon appeared as contestants.

In August 2013, Barber was announced as a contestant on the upcoming series of Dancing with the Stars. He then returned to Family Feud as a contestant on 21 November 2016 as part of All Star Family Feud hosted by Grant Denyer with Kerri-Anne Kennerley, Glenn Ridge, and John Burgess as team members. His team had won the game and he ended the episode with his signature sign-off catchphrase: "Keep smiling, and bye for now."

== Honours ==
In June 1991 Barber received the Medal of the Order of Australia award "In recognition of service to the entertainment industry."

== Awards ==
In 1973, Barber won the TV Week Gold Logie Award for Most Popular Personality on Australian Television.

== Discography ==
=== Studio albums ===
List of albums, with selected chart positions
Title	Album details	Peak chart positions
Title	Album details	AUS
Temptation	Released: August 1973; Format: LP; Label: RCA Victor (SP-119)	54
If You Feel Like Singing	Released: 1974; Format: LP, Cassette; Label: RCA Victor (SP-134)	-
Country Barber	Released: July 1975; Format: LP, Cassette; Label: RCA Victor (SP-158)	72
I Believe	Released: November 1986; Format: LP, Cassette; Label: J & B Records (JB 275)	31
You'll Never Walk Alone	Released: December 1987; Format: LP, Cassette; Label: J & B Records (JB 315)	96
Love Changes Everything	Released: November 1989; Format: LP, Cassette, CD; Label: Hammard (HAM 200)	49
You Light Up My Life	Released: May 1992; Format: Cassette, CD; Label: J & B Records (JB 315)	39

=== Compilation albums ===
List of compilations, with selected chart positions
Title	Album details
The Best of Tony Barber	Released: 1979; Format: LP; Label: RCA Victor (SP-225)

== Filmography ==
Title	Year	Role
Homicide	1967	Dick Boyd - Gavin Jones
Temptation (TV series)	1970	as Himself - Host
Great Temptation (TV series)	1971	as Himself - Host
Buster Fiddess Memorial Concert (TV special)	1972	as Himself - Host
It's Time (video)	1972	as Himself
Logie Awards of 1973 (TV special)	1973	as Himself - Gold Logie Winner
Penthouse Club (TV series)	1972-1975	as Himself - Host - Himself
Name That Tune (TV series)	1975	as Himself
Family Feud (TV series)	1977-1980	as Himself - Host
Wheel of Fortune (TV series)	1981	as Himself - Host
Logie Awards of 1982 (TV Special)	1982	as Himself
The Don Lane Show (TV series)	1983	as Himself
Sale of the Century (TV series)	1980-1991	As Self - Host
Jeopardy! (TV series)	1992	as Self - Host
The Late Show (TV series)	1993	as Himself
Wedlocked (TV series)	1994	Tony Johnson
The Mick Molloy Show (TV series)	1999	as Himself
Fox Studios Australia: The Grand Opening(TV special)	1999	as Himself
Pizza (TV series)	2001	Rupert Packer
Rove Live (TV series)	2001	as Himself
Breakaway (TV series)	2003	as Himself - Host
Graham Kennedy: Farewell to the King (TV movie)	2005	as Himself
Good Morning Australia (TV series)	2005	Self - Presenter -Self, Guest
Temptation (TV series)	2007	Self - Host
Dancing with the Stars (TV series)	2013	Self - as Contestant
All Star Family Feud (TV series)	2016	as Himself - Contestant
Today	2020	as Himself - Guest
The Fame Game: What Happens When the Applause Happens (TV special)	2022	as Himself
