= Glenn Ridge =

Australian television and radio presenter

Glenn Daryl Ridge
- Born: Glenn Daryl Ridge; 21 November 1955 (age 70); Adelaide, South Australia, Australia
- Occupations: Television & Radio presenter
- Years active: 1981−present

Glenn Daryl Ridge (born 21 November 1955 in Adelaide, South Australia) is an Australian television and radio presenter, and the owner and managing director of the Q Media Group, a production company making television specials and documentaries.

== Career ==
=== Media career ===
In the 1980s, Ridge hosted a music program in Bendigo, Victoria, called Breezin'; two Ballarat children's television programs, Kids Only and Six's Super Saturday Show; and a 90-minute music program, Off The Record.

In April 1991, he joined the Nine Network as host of the primetime quiz show Sale of the Century, with co-host Jo Bailey, taking over from Tony Barber and Alyce Platt. He held the role for 10 years until Nine cancelled the show in 2001, making him the second-longest-serving host of Sale of the Century in Australia.

He was involved in a famous skit on the ABC's The Late Show, called "Glengarry Glenn Ridge", which was basically a send-up of the film Glengarry Glen Ross. In the skit, Ridge scolds the other characters for swearing so much.

In April 2010, Ridge joined radio station MTR 1377 to present Saturday and Sunday afternoon programs from 12pm until 6pm. He was also a fill-in presenter. In December 2011, he resigned from MTR 1377, but he returned to the frequency in 2012 as morning host of MyMP 1377, now 3MP.

Since 2014, he has appeared in various commercials for APIA Health Insurance.

=== Other ventures ===
Ridge is well known in Australian motorsport circles for his interest in the sport, having competed in many tarmac events, including Targa Tasmania and Targa West.

Since ending his stint on Sale of the Century, Ridge has run a cattle farm in Victoria, where he raises Angus cows.

== See also ==
- List of game show hosts
