= Miss Universe 1975 =

Beauty pageant edition

- Date: 19 July 1975
- Presenters: Bob Barker
- Venue: National Gymnasium, San Salvador, El Salvador
- Broadcaster: CBS (international); TV6 (Official broadcaster)
- Entrants: 71
- Placements: 12
- Debuts: American Samoa; Belize; Mauritius; Micronesia
- Withdrawals: Cyprus; Honduras; Portugal; Senegal; Suriname
- Returns: Denmark; Ecuador; Guatemala; Haiti; Morocco; Peru; South Africa
- Winner: Anne Marie Pohtamo; Finland
- Congeniality: Christine Mary Jackson (Trinidad and Tobago)
- Best National Costume: Emy Elivia Abascal (Guatemala)
- Photogenic: Martha Echeverry (Colombia); Summer Bartholomew (United States)

Miss Universe 1975 was the 24th Miss Universe pageant, held at the National Gymnasium in San Salvador, El Salvador, on 19 July 1975.

At the conclusion of the event, Miss Universe 1972, Kerry Anne Wells of Australia crowned Anne Pohtamo of Finland as Miss Universe 1975. The previous winner, Amparo Muñoz of Spain, did not attend the pageant after she resigned the previous year.

Contestants from seventy-one countries and territories participated in this year's pageant. The pageant was hosted by Bob Barker in his ninth consecutive year, while Helen O'Connell provided commentary and analysis throughout the event.

== Background ==
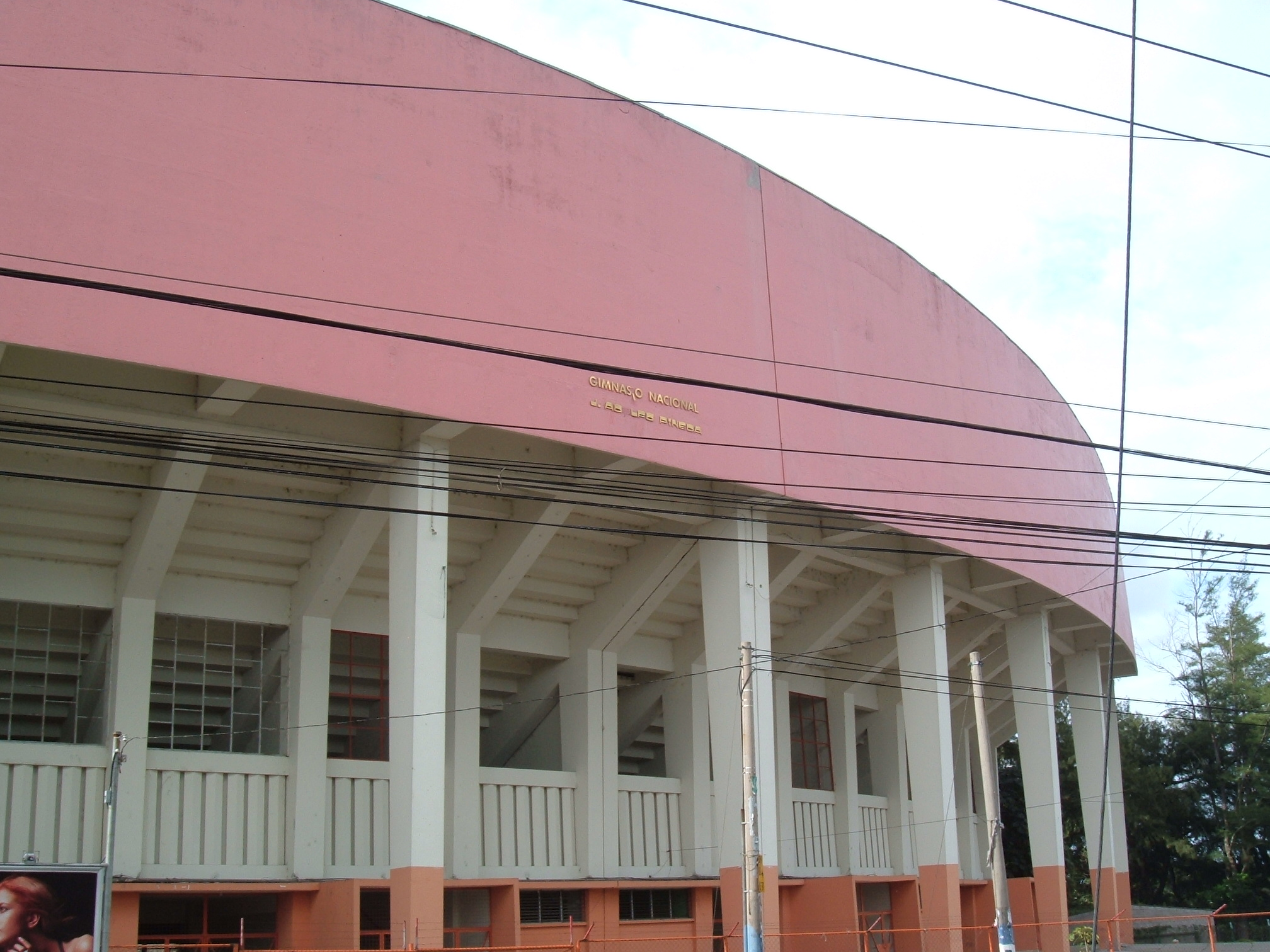
Gimnasio José Adolfo Pineda, venue of the pageant

=== Location and date ===
On 3 August 1971, the Miss Universe Organization and the Government Economic Development Administrator of Puerto Rico signed a contract to bring Miss Universe and Miss USA to San Juan from 1972 to 1976. However, the Puerto Rican government canceled the agreement in February 1973 because, according to Puerto Rican government officials, the agreement was allegedly illegal. On 31 December 1974, Miss Universe Inc. president Harold Glasser announced that the Miss Universe 1975 pageant would be held in San Salvador, El Salvador on 19 July 1975.

On the day of the competition, several groups of armed soldiers with submachine guns surrounded the competition site to stop student demonstrations protesting the El Salvadoran government's spending of $1 million on the competition. Hours before the competition, a bomb exploded in the center of San Salvador in protest against the Miss Universe pageant, injuring a civilian, and damaging the National Tourist Office of El Salvador, which organized the pageant.

A week after the competition, protests broke out in the cities of Santa Ana and San Salvador, resulting in the 1975 Salvadoran student massacre. According to the military government of El Salvador, one person was killed, five were injured, and eleven were imprisoned, while according to students who participated in the protests, approximately twelve people were killed, twenty were injured, and forty were imprisoned.

=== Selection of participants ===
Contestants from seventy-one countries and territories were selected to compete in the pageant. Two candidates were selected to replace the original dethroned winner.

==== Replacements ====
Miss Spain 1974 first runner-up, Consuelo Martin, was appointed as the candidate of Spain after Miss Spain 1974, Natividad Rodriguez, relinquished her title after joining Miss World. Miss Thailand Universe 1975 third runner-up, Wanlaya Thonawanik, was appointed as the representative of Thailand after Miss Thailand Universe 1975, Sirikwan Nantasiri, chose to pursue her film career.

==== Debuts, returns, and, withdrawals ====
This edition saw the debuts of American Samoa, Belize, Mauritius, and Micronesia, and the returns of Guatemala which last competed in 1961; Morocco which last competed in 1966; Haiti and South Africa which last competed in 1968; Ecuador and Peru which last competed in 1972; and Denmark which last competed in 1973.

Mavis Slengard of Suriname withdrew because she was ill. Cyprus, Honduras, Portugal, and Senegal withdrew after their respective organizations failed to hold a national competition or appoint a delegate. Eva Arni of Papua New Guinea withdrew after winning an international pageant. Arni competed in the following year.

== Results ==
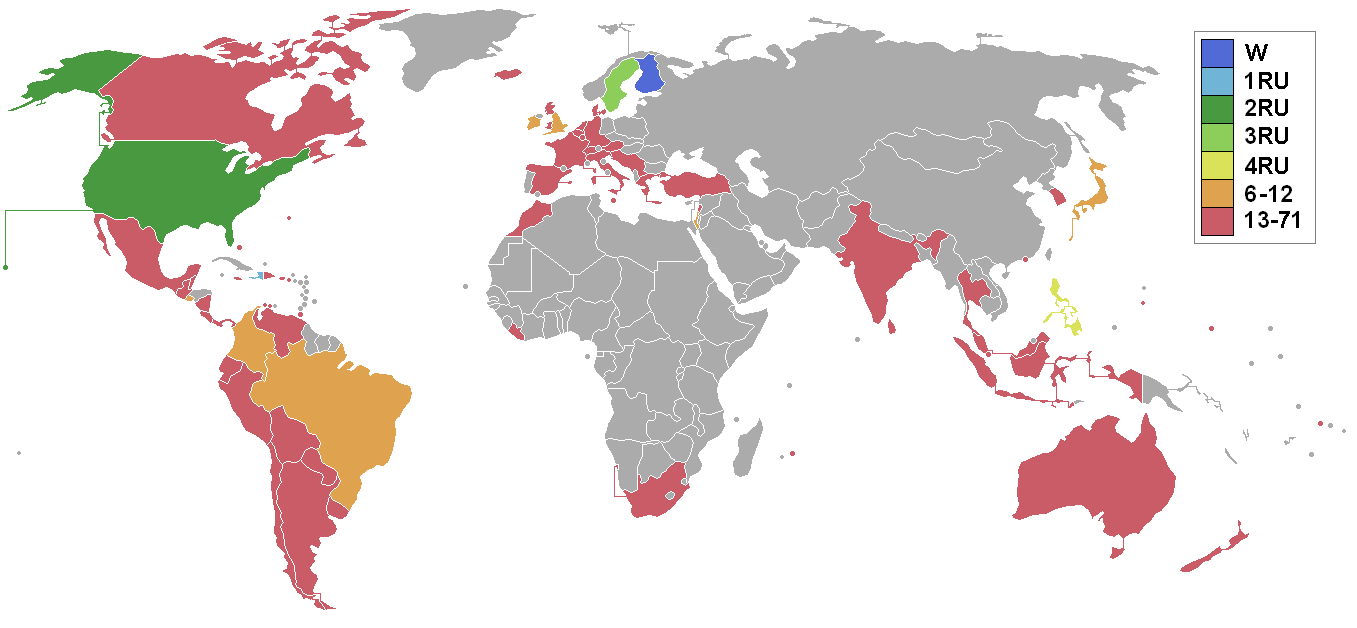
Miss Universe 1975 participating countries and territories

=== Placements ===
Placement	Contestant
Miss Universe 1975	Finland – Anne Marie Pohtamo
1st Runner-Up	Haiti – Gerthie David
2nd Runner-Up	United States – Summer Bartholomew
3rd Runner-Up	Sweden – Catharina Sjödahl
4th Runner-Up	Philippines – Rose Marie Brosas
Top 12	Brazil – Ingrid Budag; Colombia – Martha Lucia Echeverri; El Salvador – Carmen Figueroa; England – Vicki Harris; Ireland – Julie Farnham; Israel – Orit Cooper; Japan – Sachiko Nakayama

=== Special awards ===
Award	Contestant
Miss Photogenic	Colombia – Martha Lucia Echeverri; United States – Summer Bartholomew
Miss Congeniality	Trinidad and Tobago – Christine Jackson
Best National Costume	Guatemala – Emy Abascal

== Pageant ==
=== Format ===
Same with 1971, twelve semi-finalists were chosen at the preliminary competition that consists of the swimsuit and evening gown competition. The twelve semi-finalists participated in the casual interview, swimsuit, and evening gown competitions. From twelve, five finalists were shortlisted to advance to the final interview.

=== Selection committee ===
- Maribel Arrieta – Miss El Salvador 1955, first runner-up at Miss Universe 1955
- Ernest Borgnine – American actor
- Aline Griffith, Countess of Romanones – American-born Spanish aristocrat and socialite
- Kiyoshi Hara – President of the Asahi Broadcasting Corporation in Japan
- Jean Claude Killy – French alpine skier
- Peter Lawford – British actor
- Max Lerner – American journalist and educator
- Susan Strasberg – American actress and author
- Leon Uris – American author
- Sarah Vaughan – American jazz singer and pianist
- Luz Marina Zuluaga – Miss Universe 1958 from Colombia

== Contestants ==
Seventy-one contestants competed for the title.

Country/Territory	Contestant	Age (Note: Ages at the time of the pageant)	Hometown
American Samoa	Darlene Schwenke	18	Pago-Pago
Argentina	Rosa Del Valle	19	Tucumán
Aruba	Martica Brown	21	San Nicolaas
Australia	Jennifer Matthews	20	Pymble
Austria	Rosemarie Holzschuh	21	Vienna
Bahamas	Sonia Chipman	18	Nassau
Belgium	Christine Delmelle	18	Liège
Belize	Lisa Longsworth	17	Belmopan
Bermuda	Donna Wright	22	St. David's
Bolivia	Jacqueline Gamarra	19	Cochabamba
Brazil	Ingrid Budag	18	Blumenau
Canada	Sandra Campbell	23	Leamington
Chile	Raquel Argandoña	17	Santiago
Colombia	Martha Lucia Echeverri	18	Tuluá
Costa Rica	Maria de Los Angeles Picado	18	San José
Curaçao	Jasmin Fraites	19	Willemstad
Denmark	Berit Fredriksen	20	Stevns
Dominican Republic	Milvia Troncoso	18	Santiago de los Caballeros
Ecuador	Ana Maria Wray	18	Guayaquil
El Salvador	Carmen Figueroa	20	San Salvador
England	Vicki Harris	22	London
Finland	Anne Marie Pohtamo	19	Helsinki
France	Sophie Perin	18	Talange
Greece	Afroditi Katsouli	19	Athens
Guam	Deborah Naqui	22	Hagåtña
Guatemala	Emy Abascal	22	Guatemala City
Haiti	Gerthie David	21	Port-au-Prince
Holland	Linda Snippe	17	Amsterdam
Hong Kong	Mary Cheung	22	Hong Kong
Iceland	Helga Jonsdottir	22	Reykjavík
India	Meenakshi Kurpad	21	Bangalore
Indonesia	Lydia Arlini Wahab	22	Jakarta
Ireland	Julie Farnham	18	Dublin
Israel	Orit Cooper	18	Tel Aviv
Italy	Diana Salvador	22	Udine
Jamaica	Gillian King	17	Kingston
Japan	Sachiko Nakayama	19	Hokkaido
Lebanon	Suad Nachoul	19	Beirut
Liberia	Aurelia Sancho	20	Monrovia
Luxembourg	Marie Therese Manderschied	19	Tétange
Malaysia	Alice Cheong	20	Kuala Lumpur
Malta	Frances Ciantar	20	Valletta
Mauritius	Nirmala Sohun	19	Port Louis
Mexico	Delia Servin	18	Sinaloa
Micronesia	Elena Tomokane	19	Saipan
Morocco	Salhi Badia	19	Rabat
New Zealand	Barbara Kirkley	20	Auckland
Nicaragua	Alda Sanchez	20	Managua
Panama	Anina Horta	19	Panama City
Paraguay	Susana Viré	18	Asuncion
Peru	Olga Berninzon	17	Lima
Philippines	Rose Marie Brosas	18	Manila
Puerto Rico	Lorell Carmona	18	San Germán
Scotland	Mary Kirkwood	19	Glasgow
Singapore	Sally Tan	20	Singapore
South Africa	Gail Anthony	17	Cape Town
South Korea	Young-ok Seo	18	Daegu
Spain	Consuelo Martin	18	Canary Islands
Sri Lanka	Shyama Algama	20	Colombo
Sweden	Catharina Sjödahl	17	Örebro
Switzerland	Beatrice Aschwanden	21	Zürich
Thailand	Wanlaya Thonawanik	23	Bangkok
Trinidad and Tobago	Christine Jackson	23	Tunapuna–Piarco
Turkey	Sezin Topçuoğlu	18	Istanbul
United States	Summer Bartholomew	23	Merced
United States Virgin Islands	Julia Wallace	18	Saint Croix
Uruguay	Evelyn Rodriguez	23	Montevideo
Venezuela	Maritza Pineda	19	Caracas
Wales	Georgina Kerler	18	Cardiff
West Germany	Sigrid Klose	21	Saarland
Yugoslavia	Lidija Manić	22	Belgrade
