= Anne Marie Pohtamo =

Finnish actress, model and beauty queen (born 1955)

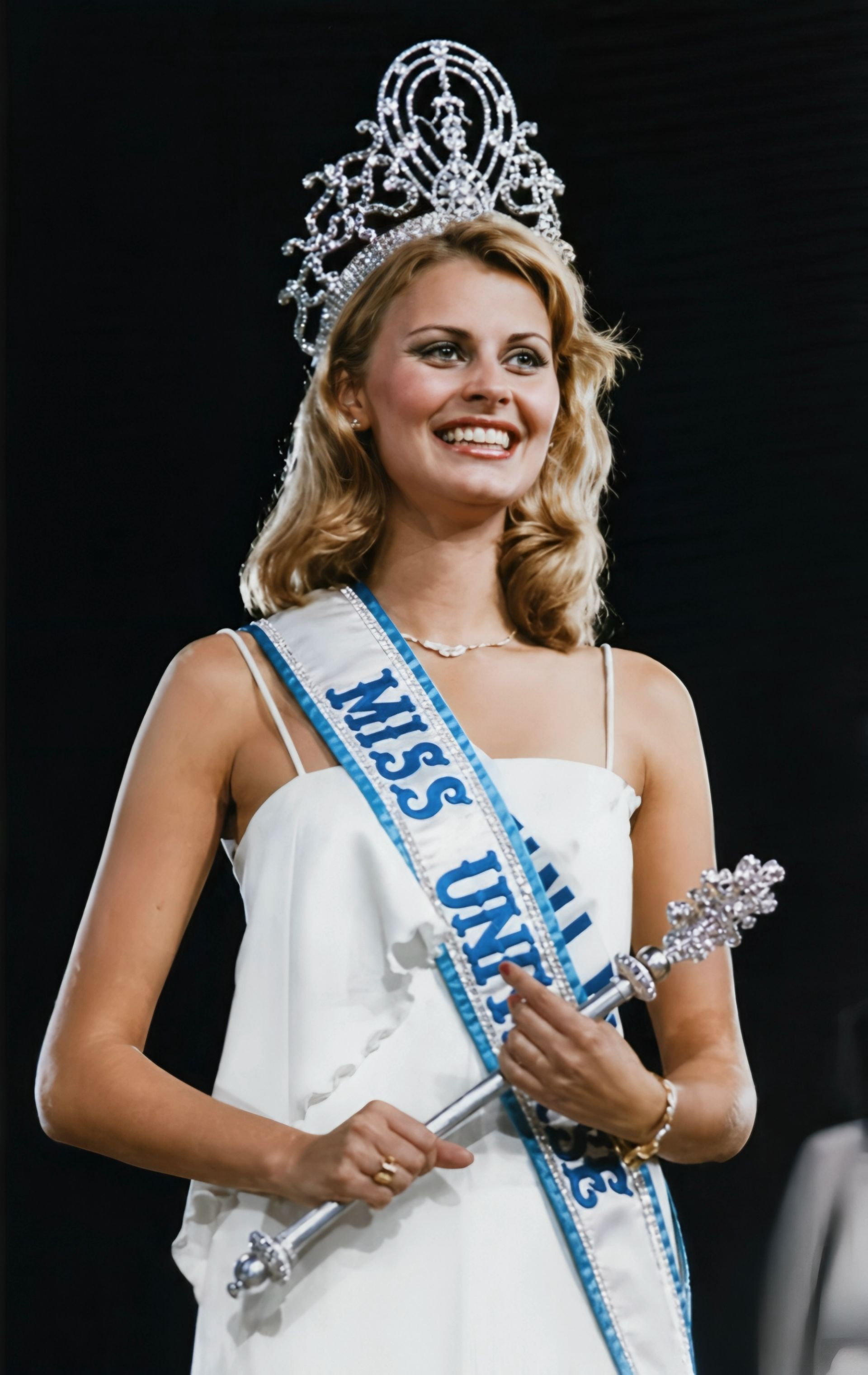
- Pohtamo in 1975
- Born: Anne Marie Pohtamo; 15 August 1955 (age 71); Helsinki, Finland
- Height: 5 ft 8 in (1.73 m)
- Beauty pageant titleholder
- Title: Miss Finland 1975; Miss Universe 1975
- Hair color: Blonde
- Eye color: Green
- Major competitions: Miss Finland 1975 (Winner); Miss Universe 1975 (Winner)

Anne Marie Pohtamo (born 15 August 1955) is a Finnish actress, model and beauty queen who was the second woman from Finland to capture the Miss Universe crown. She claimed the Miss Universe crown in 1975 at the pageant held in El Salvador.

Pohtamo was crowned by Miss Universe 1972 Kerry Anne Wells, not by her predecessor Amparo Muñoz, as Muñoz had resigned six months into her reign, when she refused a trip to Japan.

From the very beginning, she was a big favorite during the pageant. After the reigning year as Miss Universe, Pohtamo worked as a fashion model at Wilhelmina Models in New York for five years. However, in the midst of her rising career, she returned to Finland in 1981 to marry her childhood sweetheart, Arto Hietanen. She then worked in the fashion and beauty business for decades. She became a devout Christian in 1992 and has been a Protestant evangelist and lecturer ever since.

Pohtamo is partly of Russian descent.

Awards and achievements
Preceded by (Spain) Amparo Muñoz (Resigned) †	Miss Universe; 1975	Succeeded by (Israel) Rina Messinger
