= Summer Bartholomew =

American actress

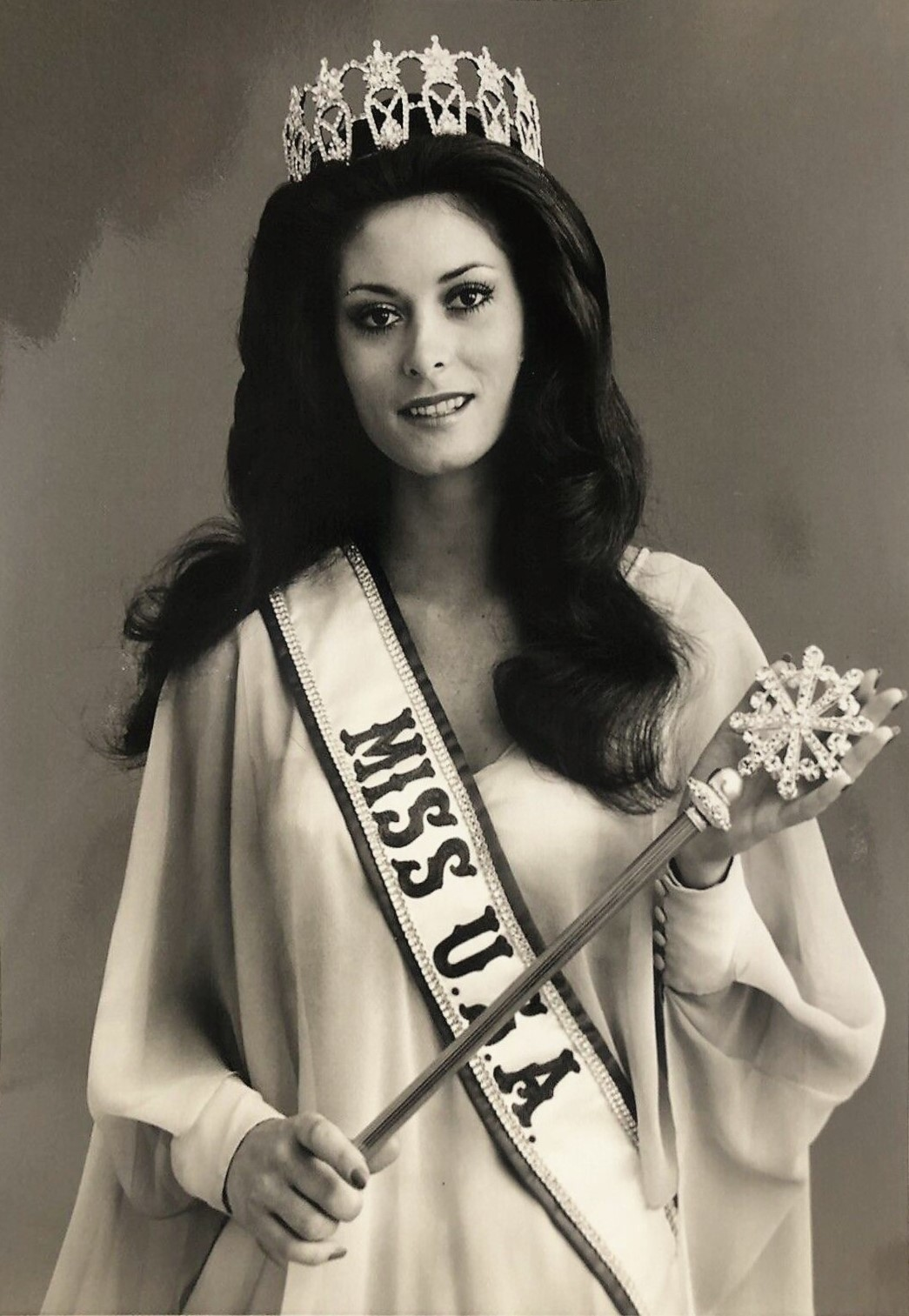
- Bartholomew as Miss USA before the Miss Universe 1975 contest
- Born: Summer Robin Bartholomew; November 20, 1951 (age 74); Merced, California, United States
- Beauty pageant titleholder
- Title: Miss California USA 1975; Miss USA 1975
- Major competitions: Miss California USA 1975; (Winner); Miss USA 1975; (Winner); Miss Universe 1975; (2nd Runner-Up)

Summer Bartholomew (born on November 20, 1951 in Merced, California) is an American actress, television host and beauty pageant titleholder who won the Miss USA 1975 pageant.

Born in 1951, her first name was chosen because of a character in a Steve Canyon comic strip. She was given the middle name Robin. Her first pageant experience came in 1973 when she won the Miss Heineken title. In 1973, she also won the Maid of California title. She then won the Miss California USA title in 1975 and went on to win the Miss USA crown. She competed at the Miss Universe 1975 pageant held in El Salvador and placed second-runner up to winner Anne Marie Pohtamo of Finland. Bartholomew also served as a judge for the Miss USA pageant from 1977 to 1982.

She is also known for her career on game shows. She became the hostess of the game show Sale of the Century in late 1984 after a brief period as hostess/letter turner on Wheel of Fortune in 1982. She appeared in the film Love Is Forever, with Michael Landon and Priscilla Presley. Bartholomew was also a hostess for the third annual People's Choice Awards in 1977.

== Filmography ==
- Love Is Forever (1982 film)
- Chicago: "Look Away" (video short) (1988) (Uncredited)
- Sale of the Century (game show) (1984-1989)

Preceded by Lee Menning	Sale of the Century co-host 1984–1989	Succeeded by Rolanda Watts; Temptation (2007-08)
