= Fabrice Silvagni =

Belgian footballer (born 1983)

Personal information
- Full name: Fabrizio Silvio Silvagni
- Date of birth: 26 August 1966 (age 60)
- Place of birth: Belgium
- Position: Defender

Senior career*
Years	Team	Apps	(Gls)
1985–1996	Royal Charleroi SC	192	(12)
1996–1997	Aris Thessaloniki FC	14	(0)
1997–1998	RAA Louviéroise		
1998–2000	Francs Borains		
2000–2002	JS Taminoise		
2002–2005	Union Namur		
- * Club domestic league appearances and goals

Fabrizio Silvio Silvagni (born 26 August 1966) is a Belgian football manager and former footballer who manages RUS Binche.

== Early life ==
Silvagni was born in 1966 in Belgium. He obtained his coaching license at the age of twenty-five.

== Career ==
Silvagni started his career with Belgian side Royal Charleroi SC. He was regarded as a fan favorite while playing for the club. In 1996, he signed for Greek side Aris Thessaloniki FC. In 1997, he signed for Belgian side RAA Louviéroise. In 1998, he signed for Belgian side Francs Borains. In 2000, he signed for Belgian side JS Taminoise. In 2002, he signed for Belgian side Union Namur.

== Personal life ==
After retiring from professional football, Silvagni played tennis as a hobby. He is the son of Belgian football manager Nico Silvagni.
