= List of Playboy Playmates of 2000 =

The following is a list of Playboy Playmates of 2000. Playboy magazine names their Playmate of the Month each month throughout the year.

== January ==
Carol and Darlene Bernaola

Personal details
- Born: August 27, 1976 (age 50) Los Angeles, California, US
- Height: 5 ft 7 in (1.70 m)

Carol and Darlene Bernaola (born August 27, 1976, in Los Angeles) both grew up in rural Peru. The two women, who are identical twins, were selected by Playboy to be the Playboy Playmates of the Millennium in the magazine's January 2000 edition. They appeared in a twelve-page photoset on a Miami beach, in a nightclub and in a bubble bath, and they became minor celebrities as a result.

They are the third set of identical twins to appear as Playmates.

== February ==
Suzanne Stokes
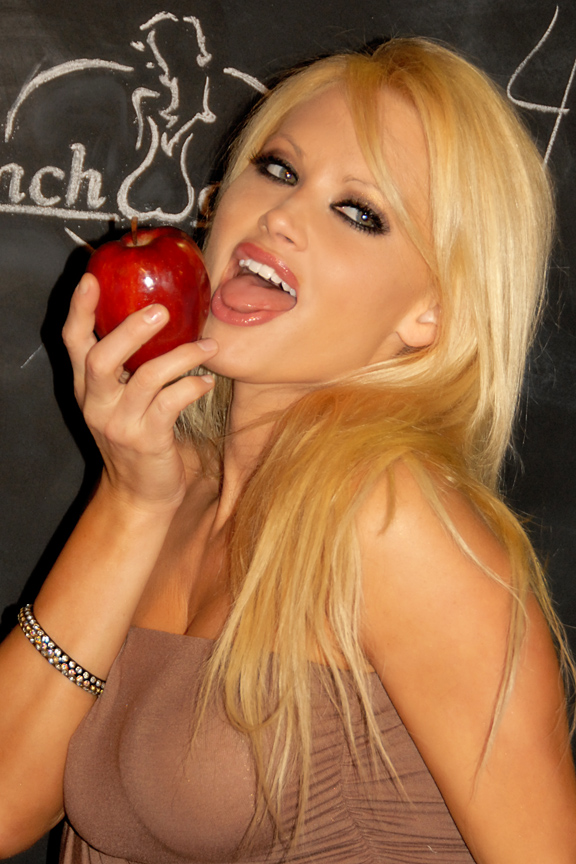
- Suzanne Stokes attending the Benchwarmer "Back-to-School" Party combined with Benchwarmer Founder Brian Wallos Birthday Party at Empire, Hollywood, California on Aug. 28, 2009

Personal details
- Born: July 9, 1979 (age 47) Naples, Florida, U.S.
- Height: 5 ft 4 in (1.63 m)

Suzanne Stokes (born July 9, 1979, in Naples, Florida) is an American glamour model and actress. She is Playboy magazine's Playmate of the Month for February 2000. She did some acting including a guest appearance on Frasier.

== March ==
Nicole Marie Lenz

Personal details
- Born: January 24, 1980 (age 46) Cleveland, Ohio, U.S.
- Height: 5 ft 5 in (1.65 m)

Nicole Marie Lenz (born January 24, 1980) is an American actress and fashion model. She is Playboy magazine's Playmate of the Month for March 2000. Shortly after, she was featured in the November issue of W and photographed by Mario Sorrenti that same year. Subsequently, she signed with Elite modeling agency, before appearing on the cover of GQ, as well as men's magazines Italian Max and Stuff magazine, where she was ranked number 94 of the 100 Sexiest Women Of 2007.

== April ==
Brande Roderick
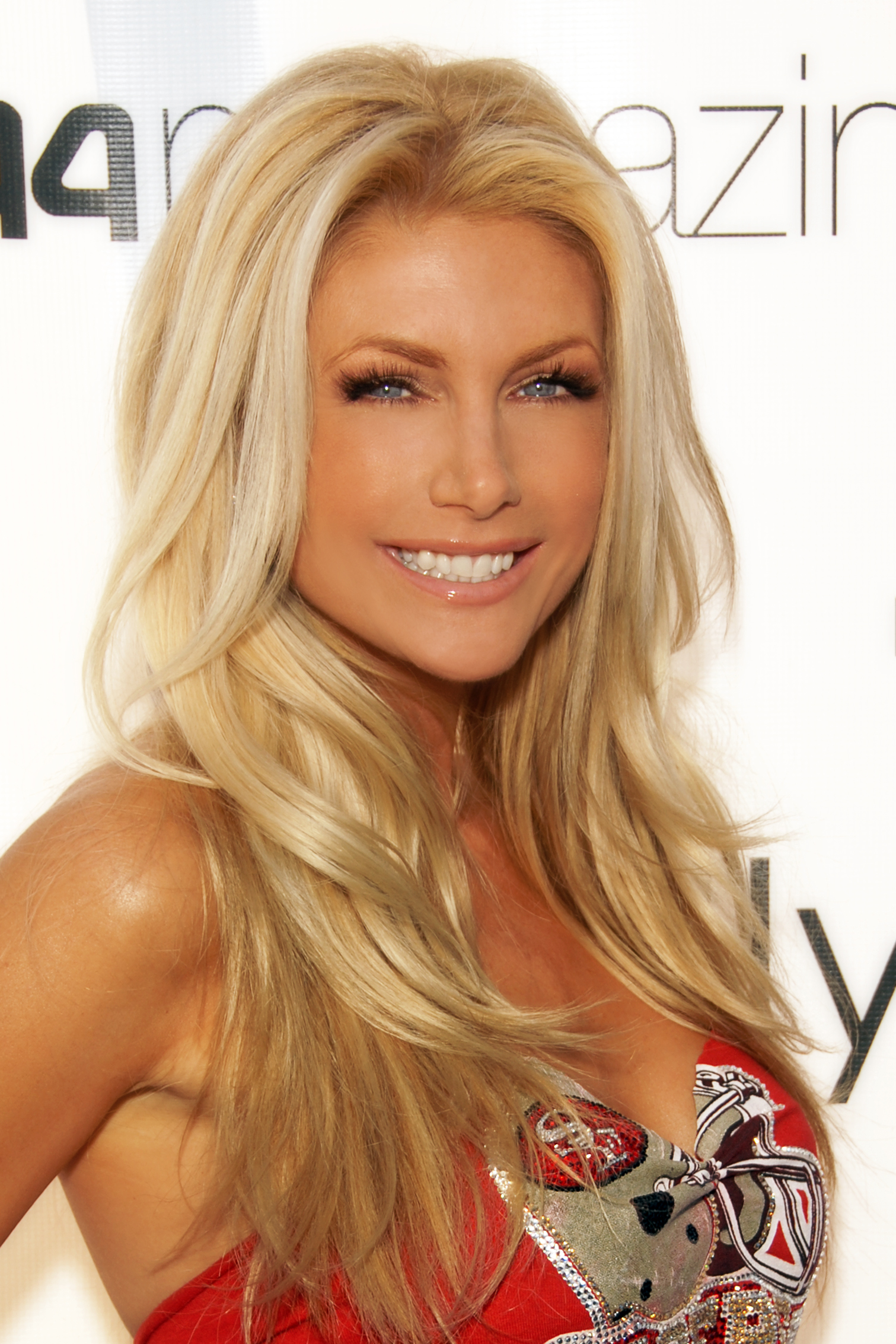
- Brande Roderick attending a Super Bowl XLIII Party at the Playboy Mansion on Feb. 1, 2009

Playboy Playmate of the Year
- 2001
- Preceded by: Jodi Ann Paterson
- Succeeded by: Dalene Kurtis

Personal details
- Born: Brande Nicole Roderick; June 13, 1974 (age 52) Novato, California, U.S.
- Height: 5 ft 7 in (1.70 m)

Brande Nicole Roderick (born June 13, 1974) is an American model and actress known for her appearances in Baywatch and Playboy.

In 2000 Roderick starred as Leigh Dyer in Baywatch. In April 2000 she appeared in Playboy magazine as Playmate of the Month. In 2001 Roderick became the Playmate of the Year.

== May ==
Brooke Berry
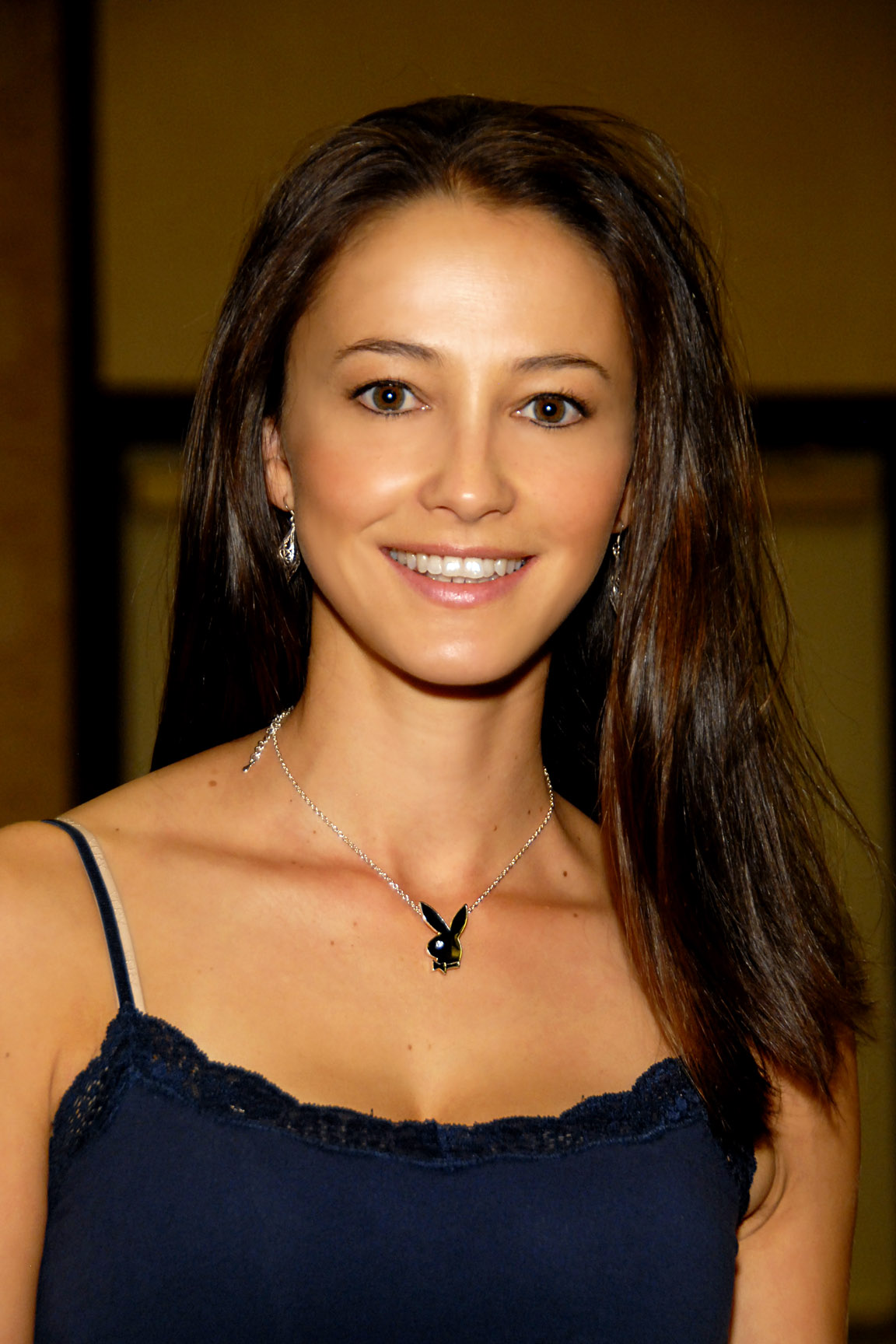
- Brooke Berry, Los Angeles, California on October 1, 2011

Personal details
- Born: March 7, 1980 (age 46) Vancouver, British Columbia, Canada
- Height: 5 ft 8 in (1.73 m)

Brooke Berry (born March 7, 1980, in Vancouver, British Columbia) is a Canadian model and actress. She is Playboy magazine's Playmate of the Month for May 2000, and has appeared in several Playboy videos. She is of Scandinavian and Japanese descent. Berry plays the tenor saxophone and is the niece of Jan Berry of Jan & Dean fame.

== June ==
Shannon Stewart
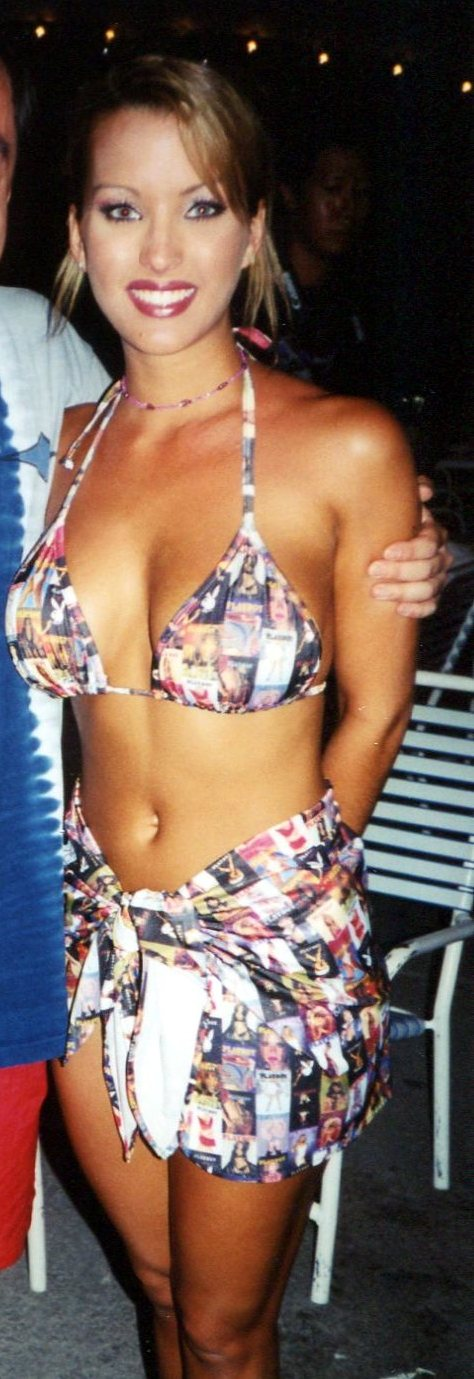
- Shannon Stewart in 2000.

Personal details
- Born: May 25, 1978 (age 48) Baton Rouge, Louisiana, U.S.
- Height: 5 ft 6 in (1.68 m)

Shannon Stewart (born May 25, 1978, in Baton Rouge, Louisiana) is an American model and actress. She is the June 2000 Playboy Playmate of the Month. She has also appeared in several Playboy videos.

== July ==
Neferteri Shepherd
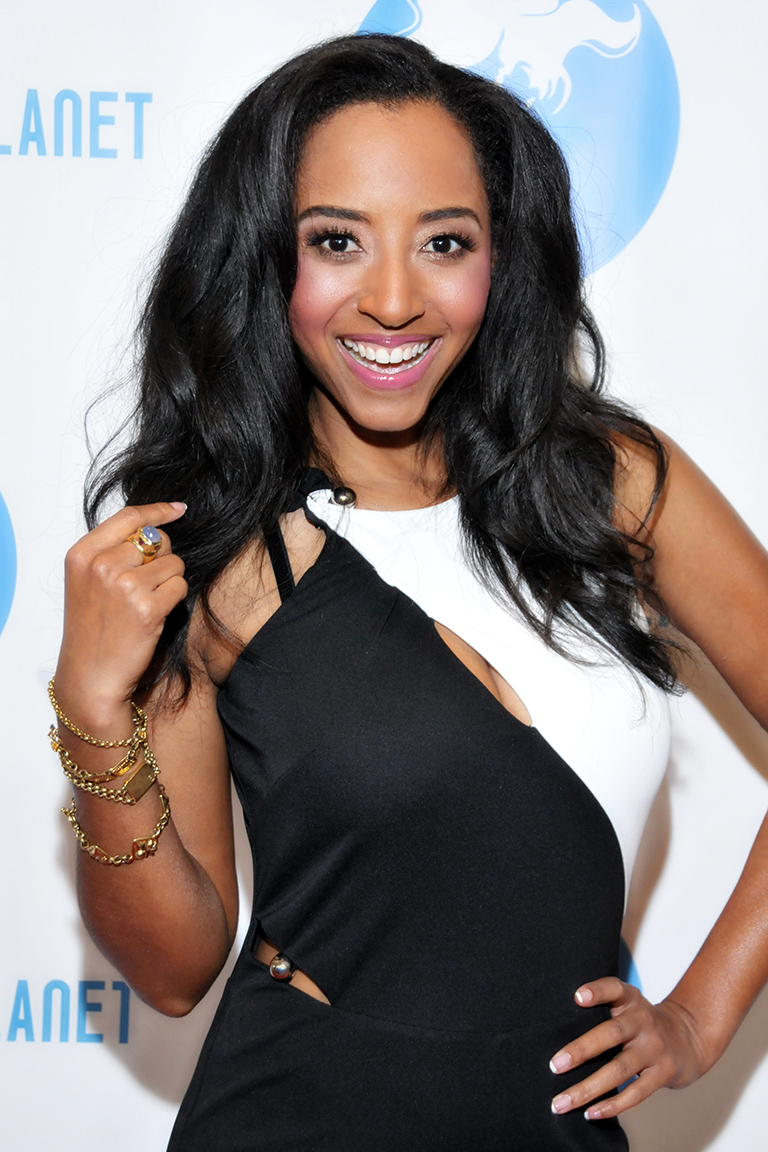
- Neferteri Shepherd, Beverly Hills, California on May 6, 2016

Personal details
- Born: September 8, 1980 (age 46) New Orleans, Louisiana, U.S.
- Height: 5 ft 9 in (1.75 m)

Neferteri Sheba Shepherd (born September 8, 1980, now Neferteri Plessy) is an African-American model and actress. She is Playboy magazine's Playmate of the Month for July 2000 and has appeared in Playboy videos.

Shepherd is also a mother of two, a blogger and a TV host; her spare time is spent managing Single Mom Planet. "Single Mom Planet is meant to empower single moms such as myself to live a dynamic life that they love", she has explained. "We host events so moms can meet and share advice. We also have a website where moms can get recipes, exercise tips and advice on dating, relationships and raising their kids."

== August ==
Summer Altice
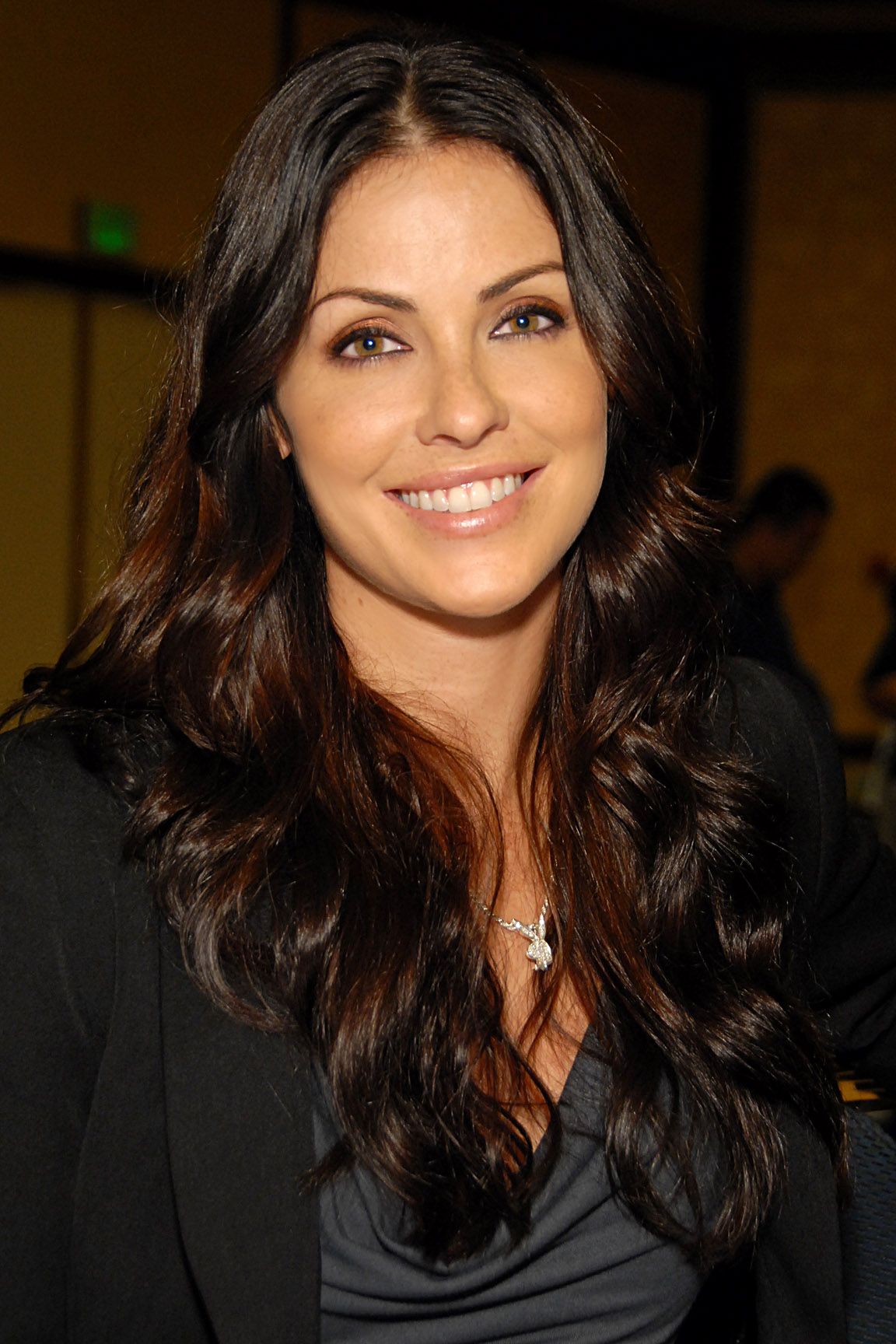
- Summer Altice, Los Angeles, California on October 1, 2011

Personal details
- Born: Summer Danielle Altice; December 23, 1979 (age 46) Fountain Valley, California, U.S.
- Height: 5 ft 10.5 in (1.79 m)

Summer Altice (born December 23, 1979) is an American fashion model and actress. She was named after Miss USA 1975, Summer Bartholomew. Altice is Playboy's Playmate of the Month for August 2000.

Altice continues to model while also working as a professional DJ for several nightclubs in L.A. "Sometimes when I walk into a club and I hear people whisper, ‘Let's see if she can do this,’" she has said. "I roll my eyes because they wouldn’t be saying that it if I were a man. However, they usually walk out saying, ‘Wow, what a surprise!'"

== September ==
Kerissa Fare

Personal details
- Born: December 31, 1976 (age 49) Orange County, California, US
- Height: 5 ft 8.5 in (1.74 m)

Kerissa Fare (born December 31, 1976) is an American model and actress. She is Playboy magazine's Playmate of the Month for September, 2000 and has appeared in numerous Playboy videos. She graduated from La Sierra High School in Riverside, California in 1995.

== October ==
Nichole Van Croft

Personal details
- Born: Nichole Joy Bland; November 5, 1973 Jacksonville, Florida, U.S.
- Died: April 20, 2018 (aged 44) Bardstown, Kentucky, U.S.
- Height: 5 ft 5 in (1.65 m)

Nichole Van Croft (November 5, 1973 – April 20, 2018, in Jacksonville, Florida) was Playboy magazine's Playmate of the Month for October 2000. She appeared in Playboy videos and Special Editions.

== November ==
Buffy Tyler

Personal details
- Born: April 18, 1978 (age 48) Fredericksburg, Texas, U.S.
- Height: 5 ft 5 in (1.65 m)

Buffy Tyler (born April 18, 1978, in Fredericksburg, Texas) is Playboy magazine's Playmate of the Month for November 2000.

== December ==
Cara Michelle

Personal details
- Born: February 1, 1978 (age 48) Hawaii, US
- Height: 6 ft 2 in (1.88 m)

Cara Michelle Meschter (better known simply as Cara Michelle) (born February 1, 1978, in Hawaii) is an American model and actress. She is Playboy magazine's Playmate of the Month for December 2000.

== See also ==
- List of people in Playboy 2000–2009

| Carol and Darlene Bernaola | Suzanne Stokes | Nicole Lenz | Brande Roderick | Brooke Berry | Shannon Stewart |
| Neferteri Shepherd | Summer Altice | Kerissa Fare | Nichole Van Croft | Buffy Tyler | Cara Michelle |
