= Jo Silvagni =

Australian model and television personality

- Born: Joanne Louise Bailey; 10 March 1970 (age 56); Melbourne, Victoria, Australia
- Education: RMIT University, Swinburne University of Technology
- Occupations: Television presenter, model, spokesperson
- Years active: 1989−present
- Known for: Sale of the Century
- Spouse: Stephen Silvagni
- Children: 3, including Jack and Tom Silvagni

Joanne Louise Silvagni (née Bailey; 10 March 1970) is an Australian model and television personality and television hostess/compere.

== Career ==
Silvagni was born on 10 March 1970 to Barrie and Fran Bailey and was educated at Tintern Grammar, in the outskirts of Melbourne, and Methodist Ladies' College, Melbourne. She completed degrees in accounting and marketing at RMIT University and Swinburne University of Technology respectively, and was employed as an auditor at PricewaterhouseCoopers (known then as Price Waterhouse) before starting her television career. Starting out working as an undergraduate at Price Waterhouse, she was to be a spokesmodel for the Grundy game show Sale of the Century, between 1991 and 1993, hosted by Glenn Ridge and later on the Nine Network lifestyle programme Looking Good. She was also the first female anchor for Foxtel's Entertainment News in the late 1990s. She currently does promotional work and has appeared on advertisements for companies such as Zoot Review and Berkowitz Furniture.

She is one of the promotional faces of Auskick, a junior development program for the Australian Football League. The Silvagni children also participated in the program.

In January 2014, Silvagni joined the Seven Network to present the weather on Seven News in Melbourne while Giaan Rooney was on maternity leave. She remained in the role until December 2014, where she was replaced by meteorologist Jane Bunn.

== Personal life ==
She is married to former Carlton footballer Stephen Silvagni, with whom she has three sons. For several years after her marriage in 1996, she was still known in the media as Jo Bailey, although she is now known by her married name, Jo Silvagni.
