= 1997 in Australian television =

== Events ==
- 6 January – Rob Elliott takes over as host of Wheel of Fortune, after last year's attempt with Tony Barber as host turned to be unsuccessful. The program starts the year without Adriana Xenides, who takes a long-term leave due to ill health. She would return to the puzzleboard in July. Her place is filled by Kerrie Friend. After being absent throughout 1996, due in part to hosting Family Feud, John Deeks returns as announcer – the position had been held by David Day in Adelaide, and by Ron E Sparks in Sydney.
- 3 February – Australian drama serial Heartbreak High moves to ABC at 6:00 pm from Monday to Thursdays.
- 9 February – The 1993 film The Pelican Brief, starring Julia Roberts and Denzel Washington, premieres on the Nine Network.
- 31 March – The game show Burgo's Catch Phrase, hosted by John Burgess, starts screening on Nine Network.
- 13 June – The children's television series Bananas in Pyjamas appears for the first time in Singapore on Channel 5.
- 26 June – British sitcom Mr. Bean, starring Rowan Atkinson as the titular character, switches over to the Seven Network, a year after finishing up on the ABC.
- 29 June – The 1993 film In the Line of Fire, starring Clint Eastwood and John Malkovich, premieres on the Nine Network.
- 1 July – Prime Television comes to Mildura, ending a monopoly on commercial television held by STV-8 since 1965.
- 8 July – The ownership of Australia Television International moves from ABC to Seven Network.
- 8 July – The American animated series Hey Arnold! makes its debut on ABC.
- 11 July – The American-Canadian children's animated series Arthur debuts on ABC. The series is still broadcast on ABC Kids as of 2022.
- 4 August – Judge Judy makes its debut on Network Ten.
- 1 September – The Adventures of Lano and Woodley, starring comedians Colin Lane and Frank Woodley, premieres on the ABC.
- 6 September – The funeral of Diana, Princess of Wales is broadcast live on the ABC and all of the commercial free-to-air television channels.
- September – Jo Beth Taylor resigns as host of Australia's Funniest Home Video Show. She is replaced by Catriona Rowntree for a month, before Kim Kilbey takes over at the start of 1998.
- 22 September – A reboot of the sitcom Kingswood Country called Bullpitt!, starring Ross Higgins as Ted Bullpitt, airs on Seven Network.
- 11 October – In Neighbours, Helen Daniels dies in her sleep at a family get together. Anne Haddy, who is the last of the original 1985 cast members departs the series. She died two years later after a long illness.
- 12 October – American sitcom Everybody Loves Raymond debuts on the Seven Network.
- 1 November – TCN-9 stages the first trial of digital television in the Southern Hemisphere.
- 16 November – The 1994 Film Forrest Gump, starring Tom Hanks, premieres on the Nine Network.
- 23 November – American animated comedy series King of the Hill debuts on the Seven Network at 7:30 pm.
- 3 December – American supernatural fiction, fantasy, action, horror series Buffy the Vampire Slayer debuts on the Seven Network.
- 20 December – American animated comedy series South Park debuts on SBS. It also became the network's highest rating series to date.
- December – Prime Television acquires the rights to Canal 9 in Argentina.
- The Sydney Gay and Lesbian Mardi Gras is televised for the first time on commercial television.

=== Channels ===
==== New channels ====
- 1 June – Ovation Channel
- 1 July – Odyssey Channel
- 1 September – The LifeStyle Channel
- 7 September – Movie Extra

==== Rebranded channels ====
- 20 March – MTV Australia (was ARC Music Channel)
- 18 April – Channel V Australia (was Red)
- 7 September – Movie One (was The Movie Network)

== Debuts ==
=== Domestic ===
Program	Channel	Debut date
Bay City	Seven Network	4 January
The Eric Bana Show Live	Seven Network	30 January
Fallen Angels	ABC	7 February
Challenger	Nine Network	10 February
Simone de Beauvoir's Babies	ABC	16 February
Big Sky	Network Ten	17 February
Good Medicine	Nine Network	19 February
RPM	Network Ten	30 March
Good Guys, Bad Guys	Nine Network	30 March
Burgo's Catch Phrase	Nine Network	31 March
Plucka's Place	Nine Network	5 April
Smallest Room in the House	ABC	21 April
Kangaroo Palace	Seven Network	25 May
Race Around the World	ABC	2 June
The Wayne Manifesto	ABC	2 June
Plasmo	ABC	4 June
Return to Jupiter	ABC	8 June
A River Somewhere	ABC	25 June
Bush Telegraph	Seven Network	8 August
Murder Call	Nine Network	11 August
Shape, Shape, Shape	ABC	11 August
State Coroner	Network Ten	14 August
The Adventures of Lano and Woodley	ABC	1 September
Spellbinder: Land of the Dragon Lord	Nine Network	1 September
Swinging	ABC	10 September
Bullpitt!	Seven Network	22 September
Kitu and Woofl	ABC	7 October
The Gift	Nine Network	27 October
Ground Zero	Network Ten	7 November
Wildside	ABC	23 November
Harry's Practice	Seven Network	2 December
Children's Hospital	ABC	14 December
Scrooge Koala's Christmas	Seven Network	20 December
The Cartoon Connection	Seven Network	22 December

=== International ===
Program	Channel	Debut date
(Hong Kong) The Soong Sisters	ABC	2 January
(United States) The World of Eric Carle	ABC	3 January
(United Kingdom) Oliver's Travels	ABC	7 January
(Greece) Anastasia	SBS	7 January
(United Kingdom) Oakie Doke	ABC	13 January
(Canada) The Magical Adventures of Quasimodo	Seven Network	20 January
(United States) / (Canada) The Outer Limits (1995)	Seven Network	23 January
(Canada) / (France) / (Belgium) Billy the Cat	ABC	24 January
(United States) Unhappily Ever After	Seven Network	27 January
(United States) The Burning Zone	Network Ten	29 January
(United States) The Real Adventures of Jonny Quest	Seven Network	30 January
(United Kingdom) Billy Connolly's World Tour of Australia	Seven Network	30 January
(United Kingdom) Fantomcat	Network Ten	30 January
(United States) The Spooktacular New Adventures of Casper	Network Ten	30 January
(United States) Sabrina, the Teenage Witch	Seven Network	2 February
(United States) Amazing Grace	Seven Network	3 February
(United Kingdom) A Mug's Game	ABC	3 February
(United States) Beethoven	Network Ten	4 February
(United States) Dark Skies	Nine Network	6 February
(United States) The Pretender	Nine Network	6 February
(United States) / (Canada) Goosebumps	Network Ten	8 February
(Canada) The Adventures of Sinbad	Network Ten	8 February
(United States) Mighty Ducks	Seven Network	10 February
(United States) Night Stand with Dick Dietrick	Network Ten	10 February
(United States) Lightning Force	Network Ten	10 February
(United States) Touched by an Angel	Nine Network	16 February
(United States) Something So Right	Network Ten	19 February
(Canada) Seahouse	ABC	21 February
(United States) Beavis and Butt-Head	Network Ten	4 March
(France) / (Australia) Li'l Elvis and the Truckstoppers	ABC	6 March
(United Kingdom) Peak Practice	Network Ten	8 March
(United States) The 5 Mrs. Buchanans	Seven Network	10 March
(United Kingdom) The Fragile Heart	ABC	16 March
(United Kingdom) Common as Muck	ABC	21 March
(United States) Captain Simian and the Space Monkeys	Network Ten	21 March
(United States) Sunset Beach	Network Ten	7 April
(United States) Brooklyn Bridge	Nine Network	7 April
(United States) McKenna	Nine Network	12 April
(United Kingdom) The Tenant of Wildfell Hall	ABC	13 April
(United Kingdom) Agent Z and the Penguin from Mars	ABC	13 April
(United States) Millennium	Seven Network	14 April
(United Kingdom) Alien Empire	ABC	16 April
(United Kingdom) The Fast Show	SBS TV	19 April
(Canada) The Newsroom	SBS TV	19 April
(United Kingdom) The Demon Headmaster	ABC	27 April
(United States) Moesha	Network Ten	4 May
(United Kingdom) Jake's Progress	ABC	4 May
(United States) The Adventures of Hyperman	Network Ten	15 May
(United Kingdom) Next of Kin	ABC	19 May
(United States) / (Canada) Lonesome Dove: The Outlaw Years	Nine Network	31 May
(Australia) / (China) Magic Mountain	ABC	3 June
(United Kingdom) Hetty Wainthropp Investigates	ABC	7 June
(United Kingdom) The Story of Bean	Seven Network	19 June
(United States) / (Canada) The Magic School Bus	Network Ten	21 June
(United Kingdom) Shine on Harvey Moon (1995)	ABC	25 June
(United Kingdom) The Sculptress	ABC	29 June
(France) Dog Tracer	ABC	29 June
(United Kingdom) The Tomorrow People (1992)	ABC	1 July
(France) / (United States) Dragon Flyz	Network Ten	1 July
(United States) Profiler	Seven Network	2 July
(United States) Misery Loves Company	Seven Network	4 July
(United States) Suddenly Susan	Nine Network	7 July
(United Kingdom) Dennis and Gnasher (1996)	Network Ten	7 July
(United States) Hey Arnold!	ABC	8 July
(Canada) / (United States) Arthur	ABC	11 July
(United States) Pearl	Nine Network	15 July
(United States) Spin City	Nine Network	15 July
(United Kingdom) Dalziel and Pascoe	ABC	18 July
(United Kingdom) Madson	ABC	18 July
(United States) NewsRadio	Network Ten	24 July
(United States) / (Canada) Beast Wars: Transformers	Seven Network	24 July
(United Kingdom) Melissa	ABC	27 July
(United States) Rude Dog and the Dweebs	Network Ten	29 July
(United States) Red Planet	Network Ten	1 August
(United States) Out of Control	Seven Network	1 August
(United Kingdom) Perfect Scoundrels	Network Ten	4 August
(United States) Judge Judy	Network Ten	4 August
(United States) McKenna	Nine Network	4 August
(United Kingdom) Little Lord Fauntleroy (1995)	ABC	10 August
(Canada) / (France) The Neverending Story	ABC	13 August
(United States) The Twisted Tales of Felix the Cat	ABC	13 August
(Japan) / (United States) Eagle Riders	Network Ten	14 August
(United Kingdom) Oh, Doctor Beeching!	Seven Network	19 August
(United States) Tenko and the Guardians of the Magic	Network Ten	20 August
(United States) Moloney	Network Ten	21 August
(United States) The Invaders	Network Ten	1 September
(United Kingdom) / (Wales) Testament: The Bible in Animation	ABC	14 September
(United States) Pacific Palisades	Network Ten	16 September
(France) Once Upon a Time	ABC	22 September
(United States) Early Edition	Nine Network	27 September
(United States) / (United Kingdom) The Living Edens	ABC	28 September
(Canada) F/X: The Series	Seven Network	29 September
(United States) The Beast	Network Ten	3 October
(Australia) / (New Zealand) Mirror, Mirror II	Network Ten	11 October
(United States) Everybody Loves Raymond	Seven Network	12 October
(Canada) Little Bear	ABC	16 October
(United Kingdom) The Lakes	ABC	19 October
(United Kingdom) Pilgrim's Rest	ABC	20 October
(United Kingdom) Two Fat Ladies	ABC	23 October
(United Kingdom) Full Circle with Michael Palin	ABC	26 October
(United Kingdom) Under the Hammer	ABC	30 October
(New Zealand) Topless Women Talk About Their Lives	SBS	15 November
(United Kingdom) This Life	Seven Network	18 November
(United States) King of the Hill	Seven Network	23 November
(United Kingdom) The Missing Postman	ABC	27 November
(United States) Clueless	Seven Network	30 November
(United States) The Pursuit of Happiness	Seven Network	1 December
(United States) The Home Court	Seven Network	1 December
(United States) The Crew	Seven Network	1 December
(United States) Buffy the Vampire Slayer	Seven Network	3 December
(United States) / (Canada) Stargate SG-1	Seven Network	3 December
(United States) Can't Hurry Love	Nine Network	3 December
(United States) / (Australia) Roar	Network Ten	3 December
(United Kingdom) Antonio Carluccio's Italian Feast	ABC	4 December
(United States) The Big Easy	Seven Network	5 December
(United States) L.A. Heat	Seven Network	8 December
(United Kingdom) The Willows in Winter	Nine Network	13 December
(United States) Bailey Kipper's P.O.V.	Network Ten	14 December
(Singapore) Under One Roof	SBS	14 December
(Netherlands) Arabian Agenda	SBS	14 December
(Denmark) Charlotte and Charlotte	SBS	14 December
(Bangladesh) Meena	ABC	14 December
(France) Small Stories	ABC	15 December
(United States) O Christmas Tree	Seven Network	19 December
(United States) America in the Fifties	SBS	20 December
(United States) South Park	SBS	20 December
(Sweden) Robin	SBS	20 December
(United Kingdom) / (Republic of Ireland) A Christmassy Ted	Nine Network	23 December
(United Kingdom) The Buddha of Suburbia	ABC	26 December
(United States) The Client	Nine Network	28 December
(United Kingdom) Crocodile Shoes II	Nine Network	28 December
(United States) Profit	Seven Network	30 December
(Japan) / (United States) Masked Rider	Seven Network	1997
(United States) Quack Pack	Seven Network	1997
(United States) / (Canada) Ace Ventura: Pet Detective	Nine Network	1997
(United States) Power Rangers Zeo	Seven Network	1997
(United States) Space Strikers	Seven Network	1997
(United States) Mighty Morphin Alien Rangers	Seven Network	1997
(United States) The Adventures of Mickey and Donald	Seven Network	1997
(United States) Flash Gordon (1996)	Seven Network	1997
(United States) Superman: The Animated Series	Nine Network	1997

== Subscription television ==
=== Domestic ===
Program	Channel	Debut date
Let's Wiggle	Disney Channel	June

=== International ===
Program	Channel	Debut date
(United States) The Real World	MTV	April
(United States) The Wubbulous World of Dr. Seuss	Nickelodeon	May
(United States) Recess	Disney Channel	5 December
(United States) Blue's Clues	Nickelodeon	1997
(United States) Brand Spanking New Doug	Disney Channel	1997
(United States) Johnny Bravo	Cartoon Network	1997
(United States) Cow and Chicken	Cartoon Network	1997
(United States) The Moxy Show	Cartoon Network	1997
(Canada) / (France) Blazing Dragons	Nickelodeon	1997
(United Kingdom) The Story Store	Nickelodeon	1997
(United Kingdom) Bug Alert	Nickelodeon	1997

=== Subscription premieres ===
This is a list of programs which made their premiere on Australian subscription television that had previously premiered on Australian free-to-air television. Programs may still air on the original free-to-air television network.

=== Domestic ===
Program	Subscription network	Free-to-air network	Date
The Curiosity Show	Nickelodeon	Nine Network	January

==== International ====
Program	Subscription network	Free-to-air network	Date
(United Kingdom) Victoria Wood as Seen on TV	UKTV	ABC	8 June
(Canada) F/X: The Series	Fox8	Seven Network	20 November
(United States) VR.5	Fox8	Seven Network	22 November
(United States) Dexter's Laboratory	Cartoon Network	Seven Network	1997
(France) / (Italy) Orson and Olivia	Nickelodeon	ABC	1997

=== Changes to network affiliation ===
This is a list of programs which made their premiere on an Australian television network that had premiered on another Australian television network. The networks involved in the switch of allegiances are predominantly both free-to-air networks or both subscription television networks. Programs that have their free-to-air/subscription television premiere, after having premiered on the opposite platform (free-to air to subscription/subscription to free-to air) are not included. In some cases, programs may still air on the original television network. This occurs predominantly with programs shared between subscription television networks.

==== Domestic ====
Program	New network(s)	Previous network(s)	Date
Heartbreak High	ABC	Network Ten	3 February
Hey Dad..! (repeats)	Seven Network	Network Ten	January
Prisoner (repeats)	Seven Network	Network Ten	January

==== International ====
Program	New network(s)	Previous network(s)	Date
(France) / (United States) / (Canada) M.A.S.K.	Network Ten	Nine Network	4 February
(United States) Full House	Nine Network	Seven Network	10 February
(United States) Ricki Lake	Seven Network	Network Ten	17 February
(United Kingdom) An Audience with Billy Connolly	Seven Network	ABC	20 March
(United States) / (France) Dennis the Menace (1986)	Network Ten	ABC	28 April
(France) / (United States) / (Canada) Inspector Gadget	Network Ten	ABC	9 June
(United Kingdom) Mr. Bean	Seven Network	ABC	26 June
(United States) Barney & Friends	Network Ten	Nine Network	18 October

== Television shows ==
ABC

- Mr. Squiggle and Friends (1959–1999)
- Four Corners (1961–present)

Seven Network

- Wheel of Fortune (1981–1996, 1996–2003, 2004–2008)
- Home and Away (1988–present)
- Blue Heelers (1994–2006)
- The Great Outdoors (1993–present)
- Today Tonight (1995–present)

Nine Network

- Today (1982–present)
- Sale of the Century (1980–2001)
- A Current Affair (1971–1978, 1988–present)
- Hey Hey It's Saturday (1971–1999)
- Midday (1985–1998)
- 60 Minutes (1979–present)
- Australia's Funniest Home Video Show (1990–2000, 2000–2004, 2005–present)
- The AFL Footy Show (1994–present)
- The NRL Footy Show (1994–present)
- Water Rats (1996–2001)
- Burgo's Catch Phrase (1997–2001, 2002–2003)
- The Price is Right (1993–1998, 2003–2005, 2012)

Network Ten

- Neighbours (Seven Network 1985, Network Ten 1986–present)
- GMA with Bert Newton (1991–2005)

== Ending / resting this year ==
Date	Show	Channel	Debut
19 May 1997	Frontline	ABC TV	9 May 1994
28 May 1997	Kangaroo Palace	Channel Seven	25 May 1997
20 June 1997	Plasmo	ABC TV	4 June 1997
8 July 1997	The Wayne Manifesto	ABC TV	2 June 1997
10 July 1997	Johnson and Friends	ABC TV	3 September 1990
31 August 1997	Return to Jupiter	ABC TV	8 June 1997
15 September 1997	Full Frontal	Channel Seven	13 May 1993
19 September 1997	S'Cool Sport	ABC TV	20 April 1996
27 September 1997	Club Buggery	ABC TV	21 April 1995
29 September 1997	Swinging	ABC TV	10 September 1997
24 October 1997	Spellbinder: Land of the Dragon Lord	Nine Network	1 September 1997
25 October 1997	Plucka's Place	Nine Network	5 April 1997
11 November 1997	Kitu and Woofl	ABC TV	7 October 1997
19 December 1997	Agro's Cartoon Connection	Channel Seven	22 January 1990
19 December 1997	The Gift	Nine Network	27 October 1997
22 December 1997	Ocean Girl	Network Ten	29 August 1994

== See also ==
- 1997 in Australia
- List of Australian films of 1997
