= John Deeks =

Australian television presenter (born 1951)

- Born: 1 May 1951 (age 75); Melbourne, Victoria, Australia
- Occupations: TV presenter voice artist
- Years active: 1975–2020

John "Deeksie" Deeks (born 1 May 1951) is an Australian former television, radio presenter and the long-time voice over artist on HSV-7 for the Seven Network (known as the 'voice of Channel 7'), where he has been working since 1975 based in Melbourne.

== Biography ==
For many years Deeks was the announcer who said "Come on Down!" on the Australian version of game show The Price Is Right, although frequently the program's host Ian Turpie is erroneously named as the person to voice the phrase. Deeks was also the announcer on game show Man O Man and presented the Tattslotto lottery draw for many years.

He has acted as announcer on several popular programs, making his voice and style highly recognisable, leading to his being cast as voice over artist in recreations of game shows in some dramatic works.

He is best known as the announcer of the now-defunct Wheel of Fortune (which he joined in 1984), on the Seven Network. During Deeks' time on Wheel of Fortune he would travel to Adelaide where the show was taped between 1981 and 1996, (as did the show's host John Burgess who would travel from his home in Perth. Hostess and letter-turner Adriana Xenides lived in Adelaide) each weekend to work on the show and often used his comedic skills to entertain the studio audience between takes.

Deeks departed Wheel of Fortune in 1996 to host Family Feud, taking over from Rob Brough. After Family Feud was cancelled later that year, Deeks returned to his old gig as Wheel of Fortune's voice-over man, which continued until the show's cancellation on 28 July 2006, at which point Deeks was offered a position at the Collingwood Football Club, which he accepted.

In addition to providing the audience warm-up for Australia's Got Talent, Wheel of Fortune and Deal or No Deal, "Deeksie"' is a continuity announcer for Seven Network stations across Australia, voicing trails, promos and ratings & announcements. He also voices commercials for Australian retailers such as JB Hi-Fi.

Deeks is also a former co-host of radio program Family Counsellor on 3UZ. He also broadcast on 3DB.

He also does the introduction to Wil Anderson & Charlie Clausen's podcast TOFOP.

He has come out as bisexual. He later has clarified that he is pansexual
