= Adriana Xenides =

Australian television presenter (1956–2010)

- Adriana Xenides on Wheel of Fortune
- Born: Adriana Coutsaimanis; 9 January 1956; Buenos Aires, Argentina
- Died: 7 June 2010 (aged 54); Liverpool, NSW, Australia
- Spouses: Michael Xenides, Frank Cortazzo, Robert Phillips
- Partner(s): Tom Hardy (wine heir), John Dobie
- Presenting career
- Show: Wheel of Fortune
- Network: Seven Network
- Show: Beauty and the Beast
- Network: Network Ten
- Style: Television hostess
- Country: Australia

Adriana Xenides (née Coutsaimanis; 9 January 1956 – 7 June 2010) was an Argentine-born Australian television presenter, former model, actress and children's author.

== Early life ==
Born in Buenos Aires, to a Greek father and a Spanish mother, she moved to Australia as a child, and became well known for her long-running, Guinness World Record-breaking role as the co-host and letter-turner on game show Wheel of Fortune. She died in 2010 from a ruptured intestine, after several years of ill health.

== Career ==
Xenides having emigrated from Argentina to Adelaide, South Australia in her teens, gained a career as a model and was a finalist in the first Mrs. South Australia contest in 1978. After being approached by Grundy Television, Xenides joined Ernie Sigley as co-host of Australia's version of Wheel of Fortune in 1981. She remained on the show for 18 years, working with Sigley, John Burgess (between 1984 and 1996), Tony Barber (1996) and Rob Elliott, and for the first 15 of those years—from 1981 to 1996—she never missed an episode. Xenides formally departed the show in 1999, and she was listed in the Guinness World Records as the longest-running game show host. This worldwide record was broken by her American counterpart, Vanna White, in 2001, but Xenides still holds the Australian record.

Xenides' later television appearances were as a panelist on the talk show Beauty and the Beast, as a contestant on Celebrity Big Brother in 2002, and a stint with her Wheel of Fortune co-host John Burgess on Burgo's Catch Phrase. In 1985, she presented the multi-award-winning promotional film Adelaide Welcomes the World, produced by Kate Kennedy White and Peter Vaughton for the South Australian Film Corporation.

== Personal life ==
Xenides was married three times. Her first marriage at age 19 was to Adelaide mortgage broker Michael Xenides. They divorced after only three years, but Adriana kept Michael's last name for the remainder of her career. In 1982, she had a one-year marriage to Adelaide restaurateur Frank Cortazzo. Her final marriage was to Adelaide businessman Robert Phillips, which lasted two years. Adriana had several further fiancés, including wine heir Tom Hardy and artist John Dobie.

=== Driving charges ===
In 2006, Xenides was disqualified from driving for 18 months and put on a good behaviour bond after pleading guilty to dangerous driving causing grievous bodily harm. She had been involved in a head-on crash in which both she and one of the other drivers involved in the collision suffered serious injuries. Xenides initially pleaded not guilty, blaming a combination of sneezing and sun glare, but changed the plea after her first court appearance.

In July 2007, Xenides pleaded guilty to a charge of driving while under suspension, and was fined and banned from driving for an additional two years.

=== Illness and death ===
Xenides suffered from an extended period of ill health, that included severe depression and anorexia. Xenides stated that she had received electroconvulsive "shock" treatment for her depression, but it was of no help to her.

In July 2007, Xenides told Seven's Today Tonight program that she had a gastrointestinal digestive disorder which had caused abdominal bloating to a size suggesting pregnancy, and severe pain. Doctors were reportedly uncertain about the causes for this condition, suggesting that in Xenides's case it may have been genetic. She also claimed that the reason she drove her car while under suspension was so that she could get medication for the disease to prevent extreme pain.

In 2010, Xenides told Woman's Day magazine that she had suffered five heart attacks in the preceding two years.

Xenides died at Liverpool Hospital in Sydney, on 7 June 2010 from a ruptured intestine. She had been admitted to hospital days earlier suffering from a stomach ailment.

== Bibliography ==
- The Silver Dog and the Bear (1997), ISBN 0-9587146-0-6

== Filmography ==
Title	Year	Role
Adelaide Welcome's the World (TV Documentary)	1985	Self as Host
Melbourne Cup Day Special	1988	Self as Presenter
Celebrity Wheel of Fortune	1990	Co-host
Wheel of Fortune (TV series)	1990	Special Guest
Golden Fiddles (TV mini-series)	1991	Estelle Drayford
Angel Baby	1995	Self
Beauty and the Beast (TV series)	1995	As herself - Panellist
Wheel of Fortune (TV series)	1981-1997	Self - Co-host
Good Morning Australia	1999	Celebrity Guest
The Bob Downe Show (TV series)	2001	Herself as Guest
Celebrity Big Brother	2002	Contestant
20 to 1 (TV series documentary)	2009	Self as Guest
A South Australian Film Sampler (Documentary)	2009	Self
Sunrise (TV series)	2010	Guest
