= Pass the Buck (Australian game show) =

- Genre: Game show
- Presented by: John Burgess
- Narrated by: Joel Fleming
- Country of origin: Australia
- Original language: English
- No. of seasons: 1
- No. of episodes: 40

Production
- Running time: 25 minutes

Original release
- Network: Nine Network
- Release: 11 February – 5 April 2002

Related
- Burgo's Catch Phrase (1997 – 2003)

Pass the Buck was an Australian game show hosted by John Burgess based on the American game show of the same name, airing on the Nine Network from 11 February 2002. Burgess began hosting the show after five years of hosting Burgo's Catch Phrase. Before Pass the Buck went to air, Nine's Director of Programming at the time, John Stephens, was confident of Burgess as host, stating that he would "make the transition [from Burgo's Catch Phrase] to the new format without missing a beat".

The show, which was introduced with others on Nine, such as Fear Factor and Shafted, was short-lived. Nine announced in April 2002 that they would not be producing a second season.

== Gameplay ==
Ten contestants, one a returning champion, competed to give a list of items that fit into a specific question announced at the beginning of each round. Before the start of the game, the contestant who was responsible for answering first was determined at random. Each contestant had three seconds to give one answer at a time, proceeding left to right, and remained in the game for each valid answer. Contestants repeating a previous response, failing to respond within the allotted time, or giving a response that the judges deemed invalid, were eliminated, and a new category was played. This process continued until there were two contestants remaining. Once four contestants remained, the contestant who gave a valid response must state who was the next person to give an answer on each question.

Some rounds were designated as "Memory Moment" rounds, where the contestants were given a list of valid answers to the question.

Once two contestants remained, a 90-second speed round was played. The two remaining contestants had to give one answer at a time to a series of questions, with one point being earned for each valid answer. The question was replaced immediately after an invalid response was given. The contestant with the most points at the end of that round won the game and advanced to the "Major Prize Round". If there was a tie at the end of that round, one final question was played; the first contestant to give an incorrect response to that question was eliminated.

In the "Major Prize Round", the champion was shown a list of ten prizes and was given 20 seconds to recite as many prizes as possible; he or she won the prizes that were correctly recited.

Contestants remained on the show until they were defeated or have won five games; the prize for winning five games was a car. The first such "grand champion", as they as dubbed on the show, was Brydon Coverdale.

== See also ==
- List of Nine Network programs
- List of Australian game shows
