= Cary Young =

Australian television quiz personality (1939–2022)

- Born: 22 December 1939; New Zealand
- Died: 31 December 2022 (aged 83); Melbourne, Victoria, Australia
- Known for: being a quiz champion
- Television: Sale of the Century

Cary Graeme Young (22 December 1939 – 31 December 2022) was an Australian television quiz personality, best known for his success on Nine Network game show Sale of the Century.

After first appearing as a regular contestant in 1982, Young was regularly invited back to the program to participate in various tournaments.

Young took part in Sale of the Century's "Champion of Champions" tournament in 1983, followed by the "Australia versus America" challenge in 1985. He then won the Commonwealth Games tournament in 1986 and the World Championship tournament in 1987. In 1987, Young was the winner of the International Invitational Tournament on the American version of Sale of the Century. Young was also the winner of two Sale of the Century masters tournaments in 1990 and 1997.

His final appearance on Sale of the Century was during the 21st Birthday Challenge in 2001 (albeit as a special guest rather than as a competitor) shortly before the long-running show was axed.

From 2000 to 2006, Young wrote a quiz for the Herald Sun newspaper.

In 2011, Young donated a Holden Piazza he had won on Sale of the Century to the National Motor Museum in Birdwood, South Australia.

Young became involved in a legal battle with former Wheel of Fortune host Rob Elliott regarding unpaid royalties for a board game Elliott had created called Smart Ass, for which Young wrote questions.

== Personal life and death ==
Young was born in New Zealand where he developed a passion for general knowledge during lengthy hospital visits as he struggled with asthma as a child. After becoming an amateur boxer, Young moved to Australia where he spent time backpacking.

In Queensland, Young gained employment at the Cape River Meatworks in Pentland. He married and settled in Charters Towers. As his Sale of the Century appearances became more regular, Young and his wife moved to Melbourne in 1984 to be closer to the GTV-9 studios where Sale of the Century was filmed.

After suffering from Alzheimer's disease, Young died at the Nellie Melba Village in Wheeler's Hill on 31 December 2022. He was 83.

His death prompted tributes from various Australian figures including quiz champion Brydon Coverdale and politician Bob Katter.
