= List of Australian films of 1997 =

== 1997 ==
Title	Director	Cast	Genre	Notes
40,000 Years of Dreaming				
The Alive Tribe	Stephen Amis	Peter Daicos, Barry Dickins	Action / Comedy / Romance	
At Sea			Documentary	
Barn of the Blood Llama	Kevin L. West		Comedy / Horror	
The Beneficiary	Graeme Burfoot	Barry Otto, Helene Joy	Crime / Thriller Short	
Blackrock	Steven Vidler	Laurence Breuls, Simon Lyndon, Linda Cropper	Drama	
Blow	Craig Boreham		Short animation	
Boy			Short	
Brief Fiction			Short	
Bum Magnet			Short	
The Castle	Rob Sitch	Michael Caton, Anne Tenney, Stephen Curry, Eric Bana	Comedy	
Chastity Truth and Kinopanorama			Short	
China Dolls			Documentary Short	
Cracks in the Mask			Documentary Short	
Critical Care			Comedy / Drama	
A Cut in the Rates			Short	
Deadline			Short	
Devil in the Detail			Short	
Diana & Me			Comedy	
Doing Time for Patsy Cline	Chris Kennedy	Richard Roxburgh, Miranda Otto	Comedy / Drama	
Doom Runners	Brendan Maher	Tim Curry, Dean O'Gorman, Lea Moreno	Sci-Fi	
Domesticated Animals			Short	
Doppelganger			Short	
Dust Off the Wings			Action / Drama	
Epsilon			Drama / Sci-Fi	aka: "Alien Visitor" and "Almost Alien"
Exile in Sarajevo			Documentary / Romance	
Exposed			Short	
Five Hundred Acres			Short	
Franz & Kafka			Short	
Friends are Forever: Tales of the Little Princess			Animation	
Go to Hell!!			Animation / Comedy	
Going Once Going Twice	Martyn Park		Crime	
Guided by the Light of the Lord			Short	
Heaven			Short	
Heaven's Burning	Craig Lahiff	Russell Crowe, Youki Koduh	Action / Crime / Drama	
His Mother's Voice			Short	
House Taken Over			Short	
Justice			Drama	
Joey	Ian Barry	Jamie Croft, Ed Begley Jr.	Family	
Kiss or Kill	Bill Bennett	Frances O'Connor, Matt Day	Crime / Drama / Thriller	
Little Desert			Short	
Look, Listen, Speak			Short	
Low Job			Short	
Maslin Beach			Comedy / Drama	
Mrs Craddock's Complaint			Short	
Nightride			Short	
One That Got Away			Short	
Oscar and Lucinda	Gillian Armstrong	Ralph Fiennes, Cate Blanchett	Drama / Romance	
Paradise Road	Bruce Beresford	Glenn Close, Frances McDormand, Pauline Collins, Cate Blanchett, Jennifer Ehle, Julianna Margulies	Drama	
Paws			Family	
Road to Nhill	Sue Brooks	Tony Barry	Comedy	
The Sapphire Room			Short	
Seamen			Short	
Sweet & Sour			Short	
Thank God He Met Lizzie	Cherie Nowlan	Richard Roxburgh, Cate Blanchett, Frances O'Connor	Drama / Comedy / Romance	
Titsiana Booberini	Robert Luketic	Tania Lacy, Sophie Lee, Roz Hammond	Short	
True Love and Chaos			Drama	
The Two-Wheeled Time Machine			Short	
Under the Lighthouse Dancing	Graeme Rattigan	Jack Thompson, Jacqueline McKenzie, Naomi Watts	Drama	
Wang: Street Cop	Shannon Marinko		Short comedy	
Welcome to Woop Woop	Stephan Elliott	Johnathon Schaech	Comedy	Screened at the 1997 Cannes Film Festival
The Well	Samantha Lang	Pamela Rabe, Miranda Otto	Drama	Entered into the 1997 Cannes Film Festival
The Wiggles Movie	Dean Covell	The Wiggles	Family	
Year of the Dogs	Michael Cordill	Alan Joyce, Tony Liberatore	Documentary / Sport	

== See also ==
- 1997 in Australia
- 1997 in Australian television
- List of 1997 box office number-one films in Australia
