= Catch Phrase (American game show) =

American game show

- Genre: Game show
- Created by: Steve Radosh
- Directed by: Marty Pasetta Jr.
- Presented by: Art James
- Announcer: John Harlan
- Theme music composer: Marc and Ray Ellis
- Country of origin: United States
- No. of episodes: 65

Production
- Producer: Steve Radosh
- Running time: 22–26 minutes
- Production companies: Pasetta Productions; Telepictures Corporation

Original release
- Network: Syndication
- Release: September 16, 1985 – January 10, 1986

Catch Phrase is an American game show which ran from September 16, 1985, through January 10, 1986, in syndication. The object of the show was to solve "catch phrases", which were animated picture puzzles designed to represent objects or sayings. Art James was the host of the show, his last game show hosting job before he retired from television, and John Harlan was the announcer. The program was created by Steve Radosh and produced by Pasetta Productions, with Telepictures distributing.

Although Catch Phrase did not succeed in its American run, the format found success in other countries. The British Catchphrase premiered two days after the American series came to an end in 1986 and aired weekly until 2004 and daily in late 2002 on the ITV network, which brought the series back in 2013. In Australia, the show premiered in 1997 on Nine with John Burgess presiding, and was known as Burgo's Catch Phrase from 1999 until it ended in 2003.

== Gameplay ==
Two contestants competed, one usually a returning champion. At the beginning of each round, nine dollar amounts were displayed on a large video screen and one contestant hit his/her buzzer to stop a randomizer and set the value of each catch phrase. Values ranged from $100 (originally $50) to $200 in the first round and steadily increased over the course of the game. The challenger set the value for the first round, and the trailing contestant after each round set the value for the next one.

Each catch phrase was slowly drawn on the video screen by a computer system, and a bell would ring to indicate when contestants could buzz in. A correct response added money to the bank, while a miss allowed the opponent to guess. If a contestant buzzed in before the bell, the opponent was allowed to see the entire catch phrase before offering a guess.

A correct answer gave the contestant a chance to solve the Super Catch Phrase, a completed picture hidden behind a grid of nine squares. He/she hit the buzzer to stop the randomizer and reveal the lit square, then had five seconds to study the puzzle and offer a guess. A correct solution awarded all the money in the bank to the contestant, while a miss or failure to respond carried no penalty. If a contestant was unable to solve the Super Catch Phrase after revealing the last square, the opponent was given a chance to do so; if neither of them could solve it, the bank carried over to the next round.

The game continued in this manner until time was called. If this happened during a round, the Super Catch Phrase was revealed in its entirety and the first contestant to buzz in with the correct solution won the bank. If neither contestant manages to solve the Super Catch Phrase when time was called, the bank is forfeited.

The contestant in the lead at the end of the game won the championship and advanced to the bonus round. If the game ended in a tie, a sudden-death playoff was used to determine the winner. Both contestants kept their accumulated money, and the loser also received parting gifts.

=== Bonus Round ===
The champion faced a 5-by-5 grid of 25 squares, each marked with a different letter from A through Y and hiding a different catch phrase, with M (at the center of the board) being the most difficult. The champion had 60 seconds to complete a line of five squares in any direction. He/she called one letter at a time and was shown its catch phrase, and could offer multiple guesses until either solving it or choosing to pass. Passed squares remained in play and could be called again.

Completing a line of five awarded a bonus prize worth over $10,000 if the line included the M, or worth over $5,000 otherwise. If the champion failed to complete a line before time ran out, he/she won $400 per claimed square if the M had been solved, or $200 per square otherwise.

Any contestant who won five consecutive games was retired as an undefeated champion and received an additional prize. At various points during the show's run, this prize was a car, $10,000 in cash, or one of the $10,000 prizes featured in the bonus round.

In the first taped episodes of the show, which aired in December 1985, the bonus round was played under the same basic rules, but with a different set of prize levels. A line of five that did not include the M still won a prize worth roughly $5,000, but if that square was used, the champion received his/her choice of three prizes worth over $10,000 each. Each square also hid a small prize; if the champion did not win the round, he/she received the prizes for all claimed squares.

== Mascot ==
Catch Phrase used an animated robot named Herbie as a mascot. He was colored golden yellow with a red nose and red neckerchief, and made frequent appearances throughout each game performing some sort of action as part of a catch phrase. For instance, Herbie would be seen carrying a piece of paper with the word "FISHER" written on it and the solution to the catch phrase would be Carrie Fisher.

The British series had a robot mascot that looked almost identical to Herbie, but instead the producers named him "Mr. Chips", as he was thought to resemble a computer chip. In the 2006 pilot, he was referred to as "Mr. Clues".

== Sale, cancellation, and replacement ==
When Catch Phrase was presented for potential affiliates at the 1985 NATPE Market & Conference in Los Angeles, Telepictures offered it as a barter series with a condition that, should it be cancelled before the 1985-86 television season ended, the stations airing it would receive a replacement at no additional cost if they wanted one. The company referred to this as an "insurance policy".

Catch Phrase‘s ratings were low from the start, prompting action at what was now Lorimar-Telepictures. In November 1985, a pilot for a game show called Make a Match was shot, and the response was strong enough that the company wanted to put it on the air. The decision enabled Lorimar-Telepictures to invoke the condition and cease production on Catch Phrase, which company vice president Peter Temple said was showing “no upside”.

Catch Phrase came to an end on January 10, 1986, after thirteen weeks of episodes. The following Monday, its replacement series, which had its name changed to Perfect Match following the pilot, began airing; it would run for the remainder of the season before it would also be cancelled.

== 2006 pilot ==
In 2006, a pilot was taped for a possible syndicated revival of Catchphrase, called All-New Catch Phrase. Hosted by Todd Newton and produced in association with Granada USA, the pilot ultimately did not sell until 2011, when the Vietnamese version of the show, locally called Đuổi hình bắt chữ, bought this pilot format and used from 2011 to 2016.

== International versions ==
Status

- Currently broadcasting
- Formerly broadcast
- Upcoming or returning

Country	Local name	Host	Network	Premiere date	End date
Australia	Catch Phrase	John Burgess	Nine Network	March 31, 1997	1999
Australia	Burgo's Catch Phrase	John Burgess	Nine Network	2000; 2002	2001; November 26, 2003
Greece	Bρες τη φράση Vres ti Frasi	Miltos Makridis (1998–2000; 2001 (last episode only)); Joyce Evidi (2000–2001)	Mega Channel	1998	July 12, 2001
Indonesia	Tebak Gambar	David Chalik	RCTI	September 3, 2001	April 3, 2003
Italy	Caccia alla Frase	Peppe Quintale	Italia 1	1998	1998
Poland	O co chodzi?	Agnieszka Wróblewska	TVN	1999	2000
Turkey	Resmece	Ziya Kürküt	ATV	1993	1993
United Kingdom	Catchphrase	Roy Walker (January 12, 1986 – November 13, 1999); Nick Weir (January 7, 2000 – May 12, 2001; May 5, 2003 – April 23, 2004); Mark Curry (June 24, 2002 – December 19, 2002); Stephen Mulhern (April 7, 2013 – present)	ITV	January 12, 1986; April 7, 2013	April 23, 2004 present
United Kingdom	Family Catchphrase	Andrew O'Connor	The Family Channel	December 25, 1993	June 14, 1994
Vietnam	Đuổi hình bắt chữ	Xuân Bắc (2004, 2005–2019); Sĩ Tiến (2005); Thu Hương (2005; 2006 only for couple specials)	Hanoi Radio Television	March 6, 2004	January 1, 2019
