= Plasmo =

- The main character of the series, Plasmo.
- Genre: Animation
- Created by: Anthony Lawrence
- Developed by: Anthony Lawrence
- Written by: Anthony Lawrence
- Directed by: Anthony Lawrence
- Voices of: Abbe Holmes; Pia Morley; Phillip Houghton; Vivien Davies; Simon Watt
- Theme music composer: Phillip Houghton
- Composer: Phillip Houghton
- Country of origin: Australia
- Original language: English
- No. of seasons: 1
- No. of episodes: 13

Production
- Producers: Tony Wright; Anthony Lawrence
- Production location: Melbourne
- Editor: Bruce Joy
- Running time: 5 minutes
- Production companies: Plasmo Mega Studios; Film Victoria

Original release
- Network: ABC
- Release: 4 June – 20 June 1997

Plasmo (stylised as PLASMO) is an Australian children's science fiction claymation television series that consisted of a half-hour short film ("Happy Hatchday to Plasmo") made in 1989 followed by thirteen 5-minute episodes made in 1996 which aired on the ABC in 1997, and 24 other countries. The series was certified a G rating.

Plasmo Mega Studios, the show's production company, was founded in 1993 "with the express purpose of producing the stop motion animation series". The company closed down 11 years later in 2004.

Plasmo models were featured in the 1998 Canberra Design and Construction Exhibition Concepts, at the National Film and Sound Archive.

According to Anthony Lawrence, he "devised, wrote, directed, co-produced and co-animated" the series.

Lawrence has uploaded all 13 episodes in a playlist on his YouTube channel, as well as excerpts of his 20 minutes documentary in a separate playlist.

== Development ==
The character of Plasmo was originally developed by Anthony Lawrence in 1981 for a short film entitled "Plasmo versus the Space Bullies". The short was shot on a Super 8 mm film. It became "popular with [his fellow] College students". The second Plasmo film was a sequel titled "Plasmo and the Space Party". It was made in 1983. As Lawrence was unhappy with the quality and format of the Super 8, when he began work on the next Plasmo film, which was called "Happy Hatchday to Plasmo" and released in 1986, he used a newly acquired "second hand 16mm Bolex" instead.

Despite being turned down for funding by the Australian Film Commission three times, Lawrence continued working on the film, and "began updating the ABC on [his] intentions to create a children's animation", in the hopes that they would be willing to buy the idea upon Happy Hatchday's completion. Lawrence completed the film in 1988, and sent it to the ABC headquarters in Sydney for inspection. In this film, Plasmo is a young alien who is being sought by the bounty hunters Coredor and Brucho, although by the time of the TV series they have become his (somewhat grumpy) companions.

The ABC told Lawrence about their plans to buy the film a year later. The film was broadcast by the ABC and was re-broadcast over the next five years. The ABC did not financially back a future TV series "at this early stage", according to Lawrence they said they "would be interested in seeing something". Lawrence started work on the project after applying for script development in 1990 from the Australian Children's Television Foundation. However, in 1992 the project became stalled due to the "need...to show investors and buyers what a new episode would look like".

A pilot, which was funded by Film Victoria, was created in 1993 and shot over 4 months. The short, entitled "Plasmo and the Bookworm", later became the seventh episode of the television series. Despite the pilot winning an Adelaide Children's Television Festival award, the series only became fully funded two years later, after a new producer became attached to the project. The team were restricted to under 30 minutes of animation by the FFC funding guidelines, however the series had a "running time of sixty five minutes". After various appeals and 10BA documents, the funding eventually came from "Film Victoria, an ABC pre-sale, a BBC pre-sale, and a distribution guarantee from Beyond Distribution".

The twelve remaining episodes of the thirteen part series were shot between 1996 and 1997. The series, which was broadcast numerous times between the years of 1997 and 2002, was sold to different countries around the world. A second series of Plasmo has been written, and a "twenty minute documentary about the making of Plasmo" has been released.

== Production ==
The series used puppets made of plasticine, foam latex and solid plastic replacement style puppets. CG was used in some scenes as in addition to chroma key, matte paintings, hanging miniatures, double exposures, peppers ghost, live action effects and rod puppetry.

The character designs, and the general look and feel of the show, changed a lot between the pilot and the series, which was produced a few years later.

== Analysis of episodes ==
The sled in the second episode Blast Off! has Rosebud on the bumper, referencing Citizen Kane. Lawrence describes the moral of Blast off! as "go for your dreams, even when others scoff!". He explained that he designed the Duorvin as a vertical spacecraft to "break the stereotype". However he concedes that this is most probably due to the fact that they "don't fit TV screen ratio". He explains Plasmo's unique reaction to the ghosts in Space Ghosts! thus: "Much fear is conditioned into us. As Plasmo lacks this conditioning, he doesn't respond to the ghosts in the usual way." He said that he never thought the [A]BC (Lawrence wrote BBC) would let them "get away with...Brucho flashing his naked bottom at Coredor", and added that the piece of animation was animated by Sharon Parker. He explains the moral of Big Dam comes from the fact that "Plasmo's innocent and creative mind allows him to come up with solutions to gigantic problems yet using simple means." He explains that the theme of Nice to be Nice is that "the WAY we say something, or emphasize words, can make all the difference to its interpretation by the listener." He points out that Plasmo and the Golden Robot is "the first time we see the true bonding between the [four main] characters as they each stand up to an external threat". He did write an episode to explain "HOW Plasmo acquired the Megalon Engine" featured in this episode, but explained that it would have been "too expensive to shoot on [their] tiny budget".

== The characters ==
=== Plasmo ===
Plasmo, the main character of the series, is a "three and a half year old polybop" who is capable of shape-shifting. He spent the first few years of his life on the planet Pynco, after the Hatchery his egg was upon steered off course and crashed. He is trying to find his parents.

The character of Plasmo was voiced by Australian voiceover artist Abbe Holmes.

=== Parsty ===
Parsty is a polybop, and a day older than Plasmo. She wears a tiara upon her head which allows her to create a protective forcefield around her. She has a little pet called Niknik. Parsty is quite protective of Plasmo and she will assert herself against bullying characters, such as Coredor, if she senses they are trying to exploit Plasmo's niceness and friendliness.

The voice of Parsty was originally performed by Robyn Oakley, and in later episodes by Pia Morley.

=== Nik-Nik ===
Nik-Nik is a dog-like creature and Parsty's pet who accompanies Parsty and Plasmo loyally.

Although the end credits state that Nik Nik is performed by "himself", later they thank Colin Timms for "creating the 'NIK NIK'...sounds for the series".

=== Coredor ===
Coredor, a self-proclaimed "intergalactic space mercenary". He is secretly fascinated by Plasmo, and accompanies him as an effort to understand himself. He only ever has one eye at a time, but every seven years a new eye buds on the opposite side of his face to replace the "old" eye. He has "warped reasoning and moral ineptitude".

This character was performed by Phillip Houghton who also wrote and composed the music for the series.

=== Brucho ===
Brucho is a space mechanic who yearns to become a famous intergalactic space adventurer. He and Coredor teamed up, after they both flunked Bounty Hunter School – he as the pilot, Coredor as the navigator. He always wears a helmet.

This character was performed by Phillip Houghton (same actor as Coredor) who also wrote and composed the music for the series and Australian comedian Paul McDermott in the original 1993 version of Plasmo and the Bookworm.

== Episode list ==
1. Plasmo and the Moontower
2. Blast Off!
3. Deep Space
4. Plasmo Arrives!
5. Tour of Monjotroldeclipdoc
6. Space Ghosts!
7. Plasmo and the Bookworm
8. Rainy Day
9. Big Dam
10. Nice to be Nice
11. Plasmo and the Golden Robot
12. Bon voyage to Plasmo
13. The return of Kila Wami!

== Dubbing ==
The series has been translated into French, Catalan, Spanish and Japanese.

== VHS release ==
In 1997 a video of the series was released by ABC Video and Roadshow Entertainment and contained the very first seven episodes as well as an edited version of "Plasmo and the Bookworm". The edited version of "Plasmo and the Bookworm" includes the usual opening and closing titles, the scenes with narration by Harold Baigent (who also voices the librarian) removed and Brucho's voice being redubbed by Phillip Houghton. The video also includes a promo for other children's videos from ABC Video including Bananas in Pyjamas, Play School, Johnson and Friends, Lift Off, Thomas the Tank Engine and Friends, Widget the World Watcher, Postman Pat, ABC For Kids Live in Concert, Ferry Boat Fred, The Adventures of Blinky Bill and The Adventures of Spot.

== DVD release ==
Plasmo was released onto DVD as PLASMO: the SERIES on DVD. The DVD contains all thirteen 5 minute episodes of the Plasmo series, in their original broadcast format, on one disc. The priced is $28 AUS, plus $5 for postage and handling. The DVD is only available via email. The DVD is in English, in Color, PAL, and is Region Free (Region 0).

== Graphic novel ==
On 12 March 2009, a 120-page graphic novel based on the series was released. The majority of the work, which is entitled PLASMO, is essentially the 13-episode television series story told through the medium of the graphic novel. The last 12 pages however "looks at never previously released comic and storyboard drafts of the series", and includes notation on both character development and design, and construction of the puppets. While the novel is officially aimed at 8–12-year olds, the "complexity and humor from the story-lines and characters" appeals to older audiences. The book was authored by Anthony Lawrence.

== Critical reception ==
Of the final episode in the series, blogger Jackson Chew (under the pseudonym of Plasmo & the Infinite Sadness) writes "how can so much drama, selflessness, a beautiful soundtrack, poignancy and a silly bit of humour be packed into a 4 minutes and 37 seconds clay animation?". He adds that "'epic'...isn’t adequate enough a word to describe the density of that episode".
