= Wheel of Fortune (Australian game show) =

Australian television game show

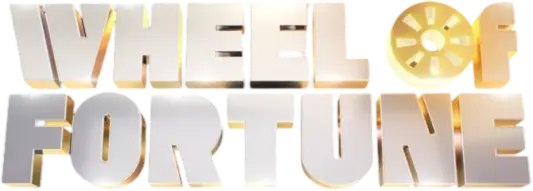
- Also known as: Million Dollar Wheel of Fortune (2008)
- Genre: Game show
- Based on: Wheel of Fortune by Merv Griffin
- Presented by: Ernie Sigley; John Burgess; Tony Barber; Rob Elliott; Steve Oemcke; Larry Emdur; Tim Campbell; Graham Norton
- Starring: Adriana Xenides; Kerrie Friend; Sophie Falkiner; Laura Csortan; Kelly Landry
- Announcer: Steve Curtis; John Dean; John Deeks; David Day; Ron E. Sparks; Simon Diaz
- Theme music composer: Jack Grimsley; 2024 Version: Merv Griffin (Note: Original theme composer) (2024–); John Hoke (2024–); Bleeding Fingers Music (2024–)
- Opening theme: 2024 Version: Changing Keys (2021 version)
- Country of origin: Australia
- Original language: English
- No. of seasons: 26
- No. of episodes: 5,093 (Original); 25 (Million Dollar); 6 (Revival); 5,124 (Total)

Production
- Executive producers: Kerri Reid (2024–); Tom McLennan (2024–); Bellamie Blackstone (2024–)
- Production locations: ADS-7 Adelaide, South Australia (1981–87); SAS-7 Adelaide, South Australia (1988–96); Epping, Sydney, New South Wales (1996–2004); Pyrmont, Sydney, New South Wales (Late 2005–06); Richmond, Melbourne, Victoria (2008); dock10 Salford, England (2024–)
- Running time: 30 minutes (1981–2006, 2008); 60 minutes (2024–)
- Production companies: Grundy Television (1981–2006); CBS Paramount International Television (2008); Whisper North (Note: In association with Sony Pictures Television and Paramount Global Content Distribution.) (2024–)

Original release
- Network: Seven Network
- Release: 21 July 1981 – 28 July 2006
- Network: Nine Network
- Release: 26 May – 27 June 2008
- Network: Network 10
- Release: 25 November 2024 – present

Related
- Wheel of Fortune (American game show)

Wheel of Fortune is an Australian television game show produced by Grundy Television until 2006, CBS Studios International in 2008, and Whisper North, in association with Sony Pictures Television and Paramount Global Content Distribution, in 2024. The program aired on the Seven Network from 1981 to 2004 and January to July 2006, aired at 5:00 pm from 1981 to 1989 and from 2004 to 2006 and at 5:30 pm from 1989 to 2003, and is mostly based on the same general format as the original American version of the program. It most recently aired in late 2024 on Network Ten with no updates on the future of the show since.

After Wheel of Fortune ended, the format was revived by the Nine Network in 2008 as Million Dollar Wheel of Fortune, until it was cancelled in June 2008 due to low ratings and following arguments from long-time host John Burgess concerning why he did not like the revamped format, which coincidentally was adopted in the United States later that year and has continued with the modified Australian format.

An earlier unrelated show also titled Wheel of Fortune had been broadcast on the Nine Network. That version had been developed by Reg Grundy as a radio game show before it transferred to television in 1959.

In 2010, hostess Adriana Xenides died after a long battle with illness; she had been listed in the Guinness World Records as the longest-serving hostess of a television game show until it was surpassed by her American counterpart, Vanna White in 2001.

The future of the show is in doubt because of current litigation between the production parties, Sony Pictures Television and Paramount Global (owners of Network Ten), in a United States court. This litigation is related to the agreement between the predecessor companies Merv Griffin Productions (now Sony) and King World Productions (now Paramount Global) in 1983 for Griffin's game shows that was agreed as an agreement in perpetuity. In April 2025, a Los Angeles Superior Court judge ruled that Network Ten (especially since its 2017 ownership by CBS, and later Paramount) had made a number of agreements in Australia and New Zealand for a longer period of time than permitted by the longstanding agreement.

== History ==
In 1981, the Grundy Organisation purchased the rights to Merv Griffin's American game show Wheel of Fortune and created a faithful reproduction of the American series, as it had done with many other game shows. The new show began airing on the Seven Network on 21 July 1981 at 5:00 pm, and was produced at the studios of ADS-7 in Adelaide and hosted by Ernie Sigley. The show's production moved to SAS-7 when ADS and SAS swapped network affiliations and channel frequencies at the end of 1987.

In 1996, as part of an attempted major revamp, the program relocated from Adelaide to Seven flagship ATN-7 in Sydney. Along with a new set, new music, faster game format and modified rules, John Burgess was sacked from his twelve-year stint as host and replaced by Tony Barber. By the time that Burgess' final episode went to air it had become common knowledge that the show had relocated and that changes would occur. However, Burgess' final words referred only to the show's relocation, thus suggesting that he was at the time oblivious to his sacking.

The following Monday after Burgess' final episode, Barber began as host, despite much controversy. Beside the fact that viewers did not appreciate the fact that Burgess was sacked without a chance to say goodbye on air, viewers had difficulty accepting the new rules and faster pace. Additionally, Burgess had made media appearances saying how he had been badly treated and only found out about his sacking accidentally when a Grundy executive had to cancel a golf date with him because he was needed at the studios to continue work on the new format.

The ratings for the first two nights initially appeared promising, but plummeted badly afterwards. Some ratings were regained after Seven and Grundy reinstated as many of the old rules as possible after the first five weeks. It continued to regrow its audience, presumably due to public curiosity, when Adriana Xenides took sick leave in November 1996, but neither move was enough to return it to a credible ratings position.

A 5 pm nationwide newscast that replaced Family Feud on 1 July also caused ratings problems for the program and the network. On 27 November 1996, the Seven Network issued a press release in which Barber announced his resignation from the show. In his 2001 memoir Who Am I, Barber later explained that he was removed from the position by the network and was offered future projects with the network in exchange for agreeing to the press release. The future projects, however, never eventuated. Burgess has claimed (also backed up by Barber in his memoir) on many occasions that he was reoffered the hosting job with a heavy pay raise and declined, but the Seven Network denied this story. Burgess was quickly given a contract by the opposing Nine Network to host the game show Catch Phrase (later retitled Burgo's Catch Phrase) that would be Wheel of Fortune's rival for a few more years.

Adriana Xenides, who had been the show's co-host since its premiere, fell sick — ultimately suffering from depression and what she called a "physical breakdown".

Barber appeared at the start of the 1997 series premiere to introduce and hand the show over to Rob Elliott with former Perfect Match hostess Kerrie Friend replacing Xenides for the next seven months.

On 18 June 2006, the Seven Network announced that it had ceased production of the program, with the last episode airing on 28 July, just one week after celebrating 25 years on Australian television. The final episode was filmed on 23 June at Channel 7's Epping studios. One of the contestants on the final episode was Edith Bliss, former field reporter for Simon Townsend's Wonder World, who won the game and effectively became the show's final, undefeated champion. From the Monday following the final episode, the network filled the timeslot with reruns of M.A.S.H. Following the finale, Seven also aired 20 unaired episodes from 2005 at the 10:00am timeslot. These were hosted by 2004 host Steve Oemcke, and produced before the show was rested in 2005.

=== Nine Network reboot and "Million Dollar Wheel of Fortune" format (2008) ===
In May 2008, the Nine Network revived the show as Million Dollar Wheel of Fortune, hosted by former Home and Away actor Tim Campbell, with Kelly Landry as co-host. and airing from GTV-9 in Melbourne.

Despite an initial report stating that Burgess and Xenides disliked the show, Xenides gave positive feedback, stating that it was "refreshing" and she loved the "... very cool colours ... and the opportunity of winning a million dollars, that's excellent." She also stated that Burgess was "probably misrepresented."

Ratings for the new series were expected to top rival game show Deal or No Deal, broadcast on the Seven Network and to lead-in to the 6:00pm news. However, following a decline of the viewership ratings, the series was cancelled on 27 June 2008, after only five weeks on air. Despite being short-lived, the American version of the said series would later adopt this feature when the 26th season premiered three months later, with one gameplay change to the wedge itself where the wedge can be won in any of the first three rounds, instead of just the first round. The celebrity version featured the same rule, but the wedge can be won from the second or third round (or additional rounds in the second game), and there are four full-sized wedges (limit of one wedge can be earned; if the space is reached again, it is worth a specific value) instead of one third-sized wedge between two Bankrupts. Five contestants (four from the civilian version and one from the celebrity version) have won the jackpot, the last in 2025 in the civilian version (won by Christina Derevjanik) and 2021 in the celebrity version (won by Melissa Joan Hart). In the civilian version, the prize is a twenty-year annuity paid through prize indemnity insurance. In the celebrity version, Sony donates the million dollars to the player's charity.

=== Network 10 reboot (2024) ===
It was announced in September 2023 that the format would be revived, hosted by Irish talk show host Graham Norton. This version was filmed in Manchester, England with Australian expatriate contestants, using facilities from a new British version of the format (also hosted by Norton). Filming commenced in November 2023 at the Dock10 studios. In October 2023, it was confirmed that Network 10, the in-house Australian broadcast network of format distributor Paramount International Networks, would helm the series, which eventually premiered more than a year later, on 25 November 2024 at 7.30 pm. The season finale aired on 30 December 2024.

== Gameplay ==
- 1981 to July 1996: Before the taping begins, the players draw numbers to determine their positions on stage. Play proceeds from left to right from the viewer's perspective: from the Red player to Yellow, then to Green, then back to Red. The Red player would have the first spin in round 1, the yellow player would have the first spin in round 2 and the green player would have the first spin in round 3. From 1999 to 2003, when the main game consisted of 4 puzzles, the red player would have the first spin in round 4.
- July 1996 to 1998: The host asks a trivia question and the contestant who buzzed in with the correct answer would have the first spin. During this time the red podium was reserved for the defending champion as there was an opportunity for any contestant to have the first spin. The process used during this period was a form of continuous play (For example, if the red player buzzed in to start round 1, but the yellow player solved the puzzle, then the blue player would have the first spin in round 2).
- 2004–2009: Upon conversion of the puzzle board from a set of 52 trilons to touchscreens in 2004, the show used a Flip-Up puzzle to determine control of the board to start the first and fourth round, and among which the player clockwise will begin the next round and so on (in order, red, yellow, blue and red).
- 2024–present: The gameplay follows the same format as the British version, adapted from the current format of the original American version with each game containing six standard puzzle rounds. The puzzle board is now a digital screen with no touchscreen functionality due to the absence of a co-host.

=== Categories ===
The game uses a wide variety of categories for its puzzles. Some are generic, such as "Place" or "Thing". Puzzles frequently refer to popular culture or common items encountered in everyday life.

Starting in 1994

- 'BEFORE AND AFTER'
- 'STAR AND TITLE'
- 'STAR AND ROLE'
- 'ARTIST(S) AND SONG'

Starting in 1995

- 'BLANK'
- 'CLUE'
- 'SLANG'
- 'WHERE ARE WE?'

Starting in 1999

- 'PEOPLE'

Other categories include BUILDING, LIVING THINGS, TRUE OR FALSE?, EVENT, and PHRASE.

The 2024 revival replaced the usual categories with puzzle clues. Some puzzles may become crossword puzzles, as in which the words are linked together and the contestant may solve it by saying all of the words in any order without repeating or adding anything.

=== Spinning the Wheel ===
Round 1 to 3 wheel configurations

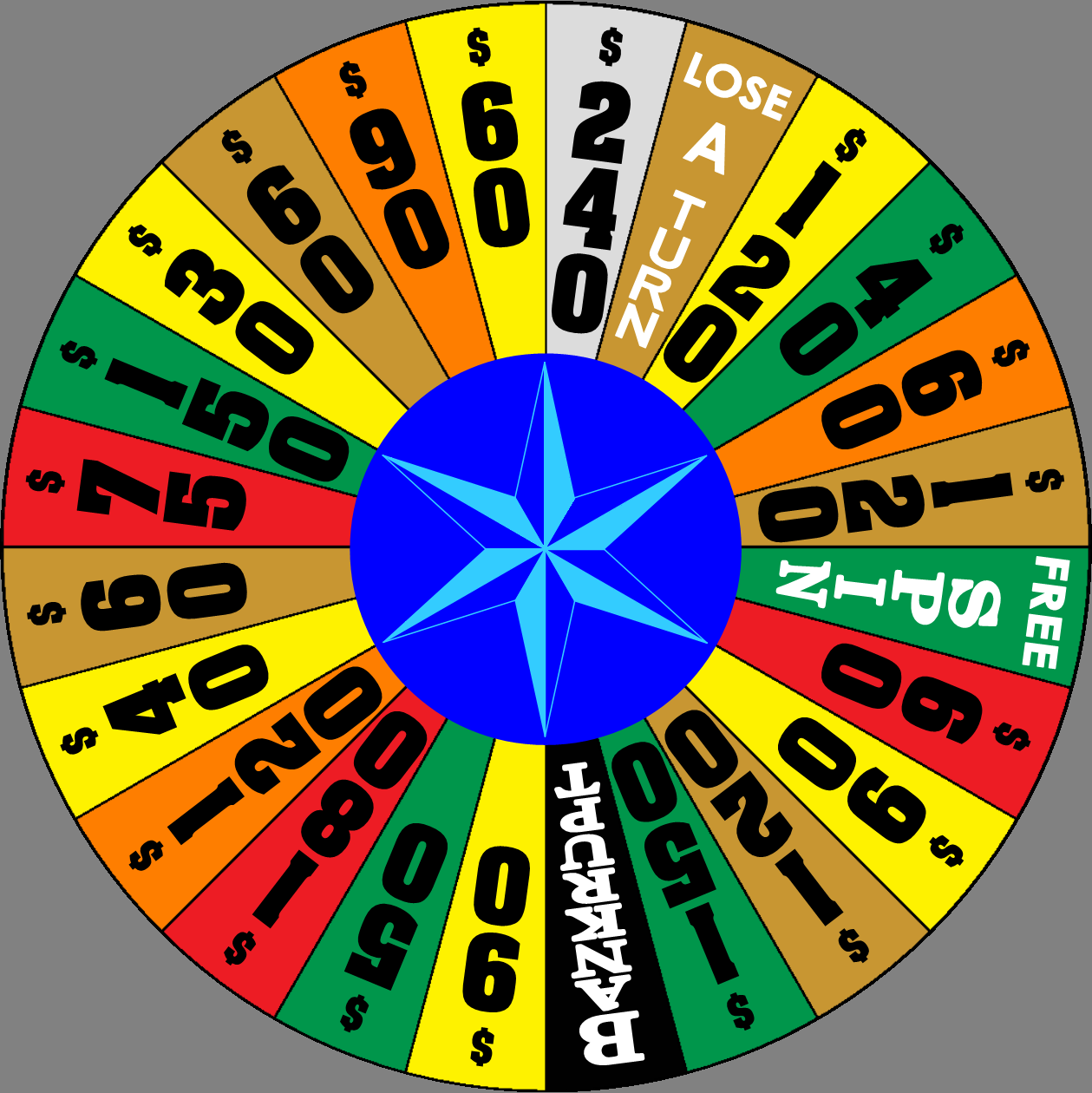
The 1981–1985 round 1 layout, with $240 as top value.

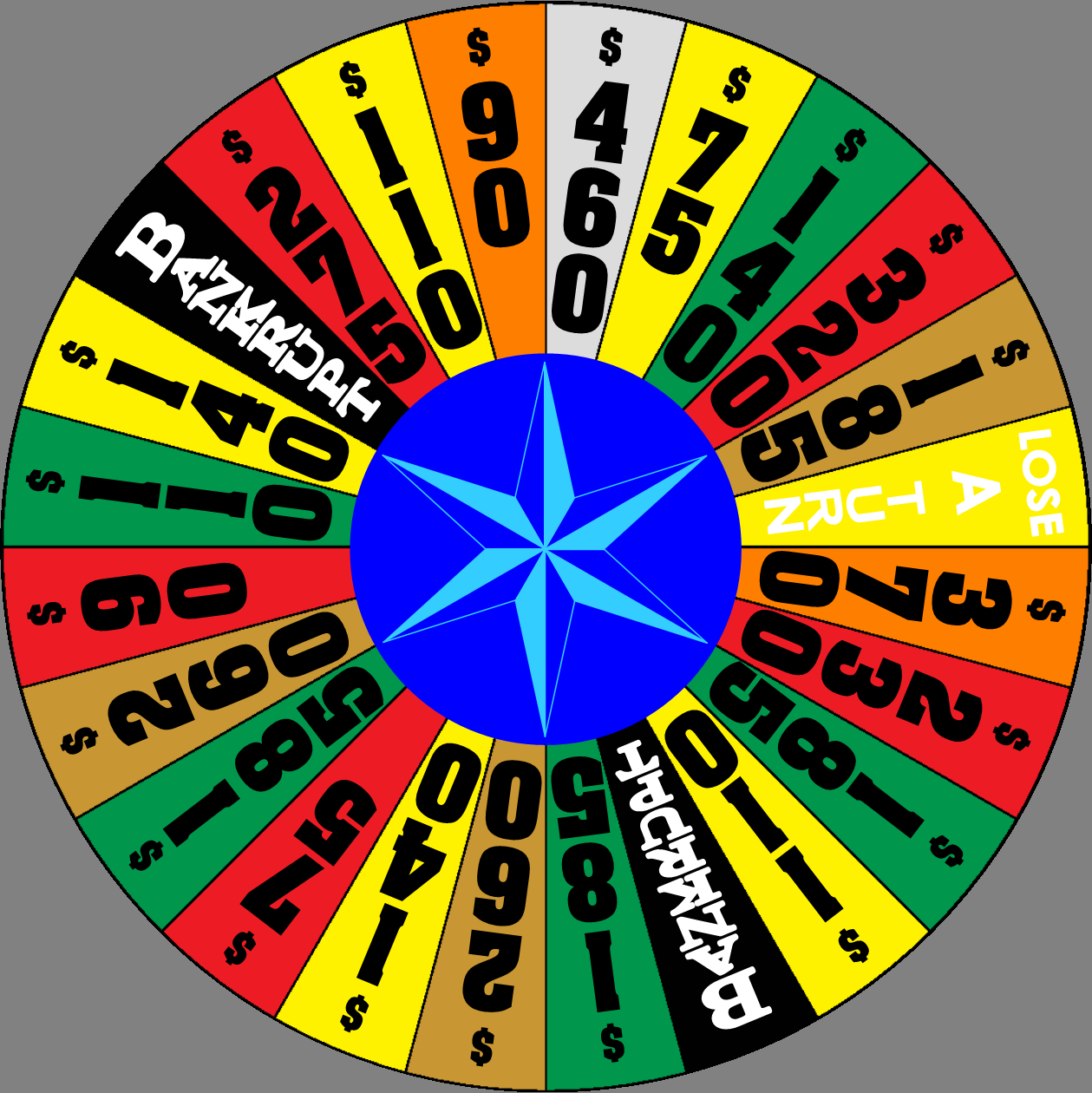
The 1981–1985 round 2 layout, with $460 as top value.

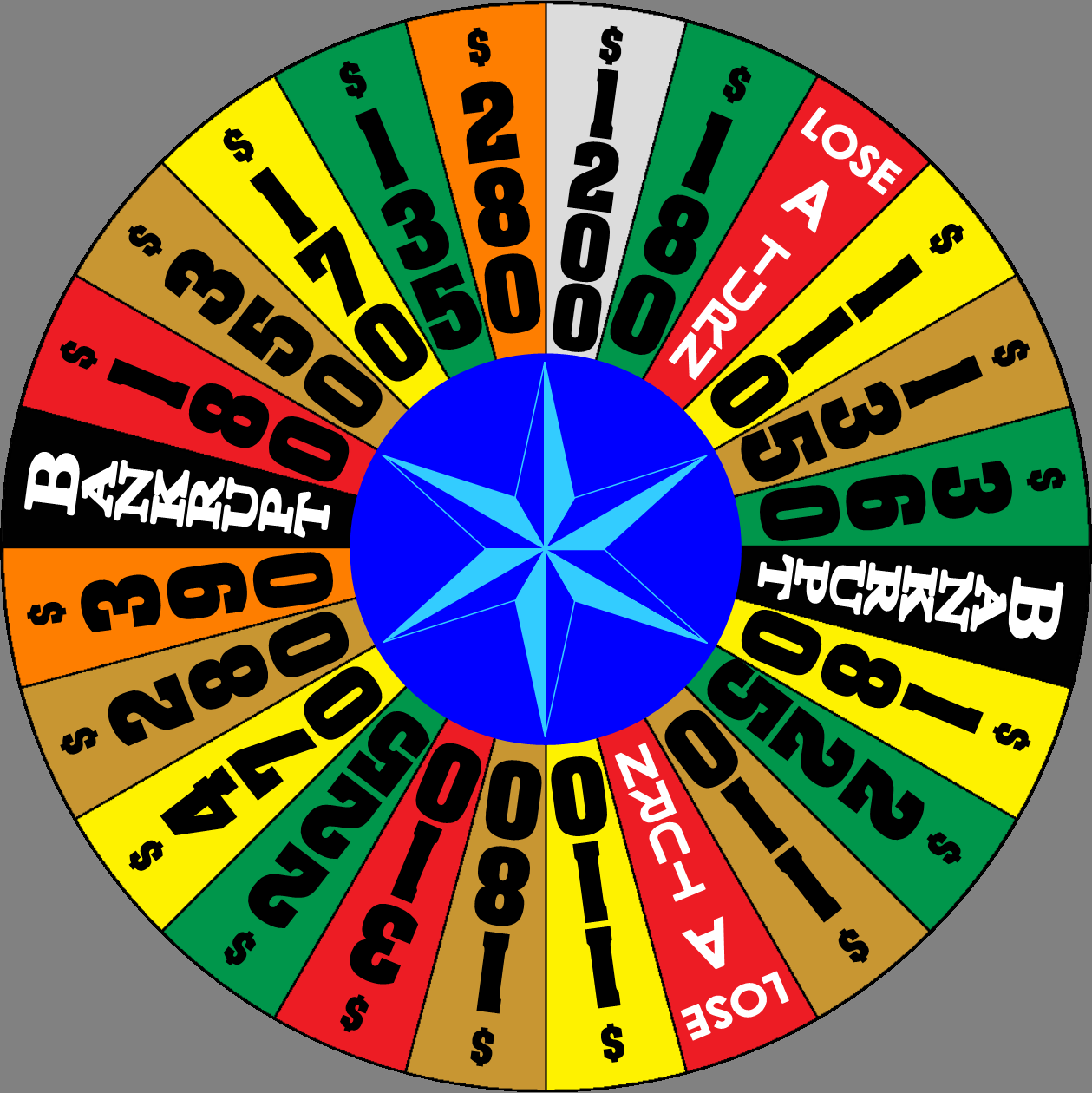
The 1981–1985 round 3 layout, with $1,200 as top value.

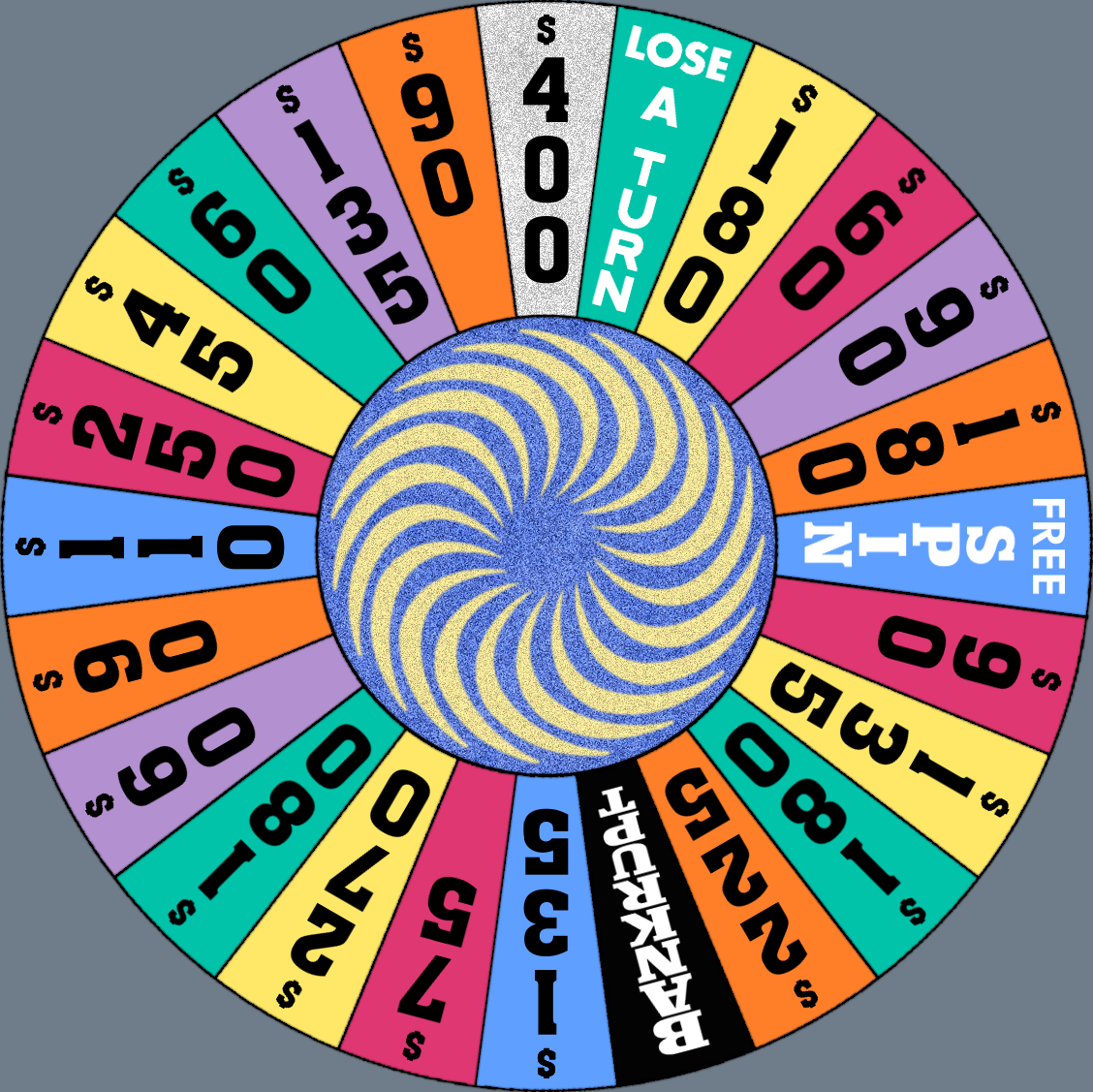
The 1990–1994 round 1 layout, with $400 as top value.

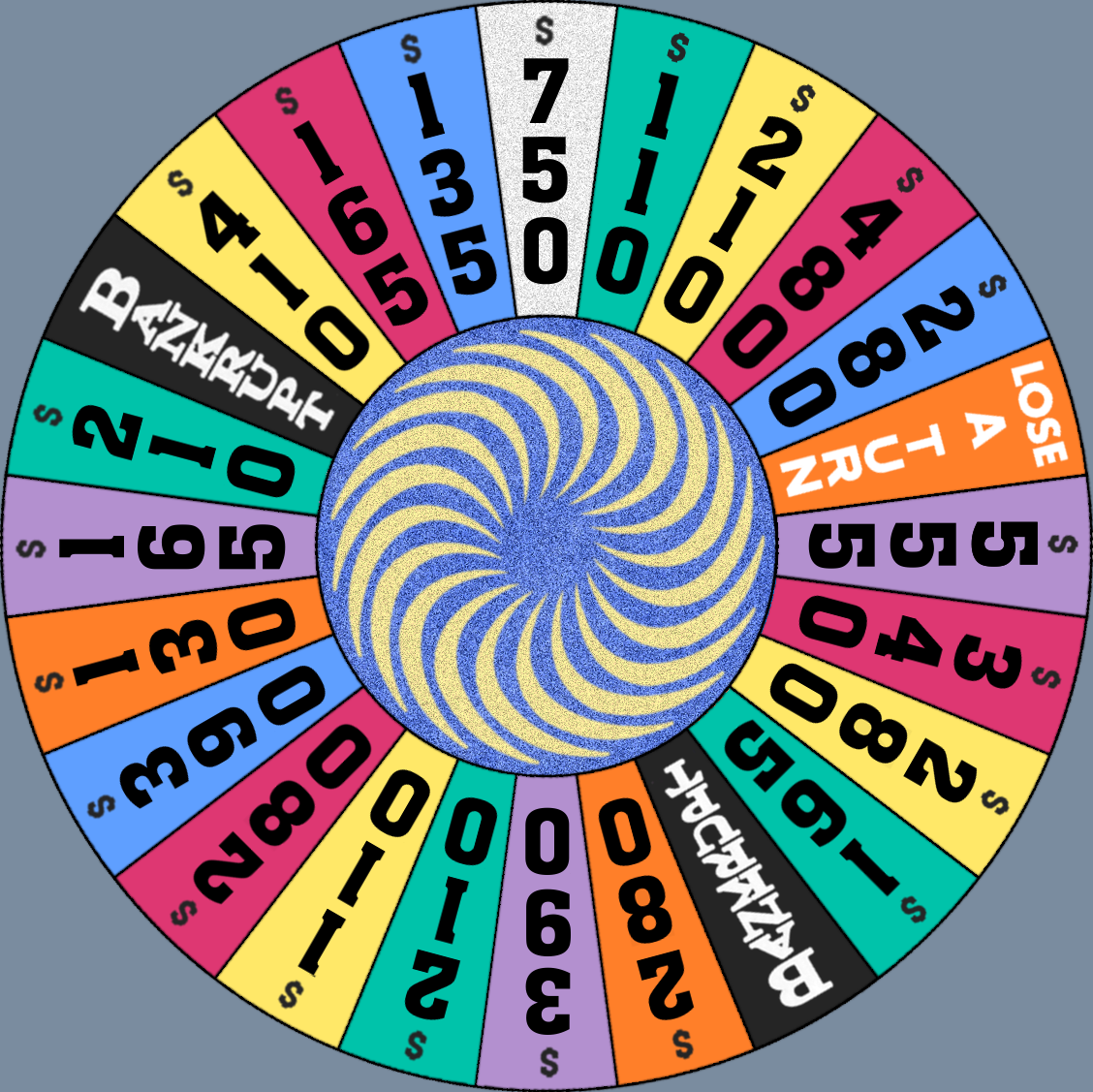
The 1990–1994 round 2 layout, with $750 as top value.

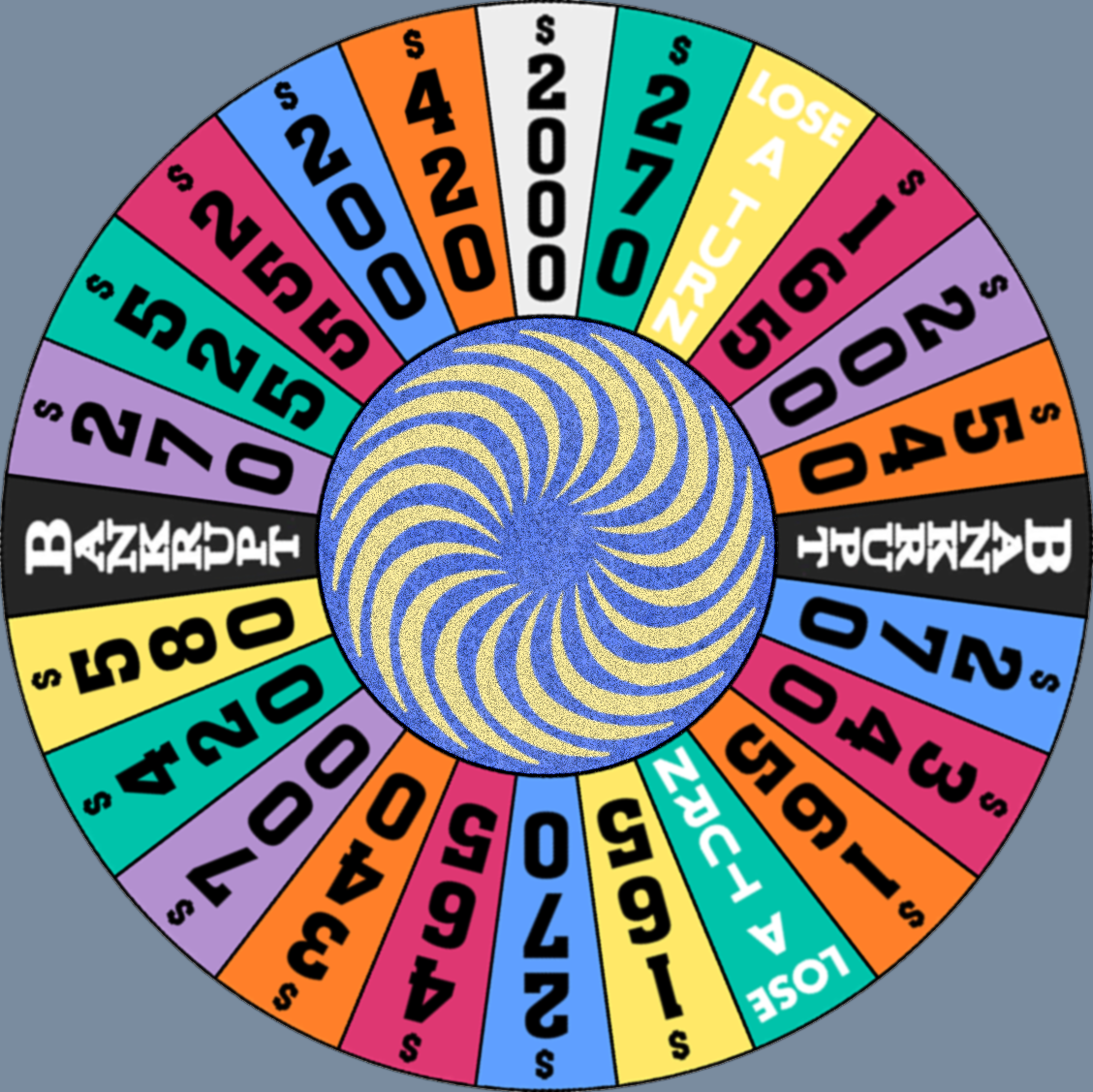
The 1990–1994 round 3 layout, with $2,000 as top value.

The wheel has 96 pegs with 24 spaces that are each four pegs wide. These spaces represent values (in multiples of 5 instead of 50), including one silver-coloured "Top Dollar" wedge, prizes and penalty spaces, and three strategic elements for use in the game. The 2024 revival is the similar to that of the 2024 revival version of the British version.

A player landing on any non-penalty space asks for a consonant. If the letter appears in the puzzle, the hostess reveals all instances of the letter and the amount spun up is added to the player's score, and the turn continues until the contestant call a consonant or vowel that is not in the puzzle or a penalty space is hit. Unlike the American version, however, the amount is given at a flat rate instead of multiples. The only exception is when the red mystery letter appears, which doubles the amount spun up when called. A "used letter board" is positioned off screen for the contestants to see to aid in their guesses. All descriptions of players being credited with a value in the remainder of this article assume that the player calls a consonant which appears in the puzzle. A player who lands on a value is credited with that amount.

In the 2024 revival, the dollar amount spun is multiplied by the number of times the letter appears in the puzzle.

=== Buying a vowel ===
A player who has sufficient banked cash during the current round may choose to buy a vowel prior to spinning the Wheel. The cost of the vowel, ($)50, is deducted from the player's score and all instances of the requested vowel in the puzzle are revealed, if any. The player's score is reduced by a flat ($)50. If the purchased vowel is not in the puzzle, the player loses their turn in addition to the aforementioned cost. Multiple vowels may be purchased until either the supply of vowels is exhausted or the player's bank falls below ($)50; after which the player either spins the wheel or tries to solve the puzzle. In the 2024 revival, vowels are worth $100.

=== Special features ===
- Flip-Up/Toss Up Puzzles – Introduced in 2004, these gave control of the wheel to whoever solved the puzzle, but did not add any money to the contestant's score. The Flip-Up before the second round is a Prize Puzzle, awarding a prize related to the puzzle. On Million Dollar Wheel of Fortune it was called Toss Up, while Prize Puzzle was renamed Cash Up because of a chance to win $500 after guessing the puzzle. In the 2024 revival, it has revamped to "Triple Toss-Up Puzzles", which takes place in the first, third, fourth and sixth rounds. Similar to the "Triple Toss-Up" round in the American version, it features three puzzles in the same clue. Each puzzle is worth $500 in the first two rounds and $1,000 in the last two rounds.
- Free Spin – Available only in the first round, the Free Spin wedge allowed a contestant to continue his or her turn in the event of solving a puzzle incorrectly, selecting a letter that is not in the puzzle, or landing on Bankrupt or Lose a Turn. From July 1996 the Free Spin wedge was replaced with a dollar space, and a golden token with black "Free Spin" text was placed at the top of a wedge. Upon spinning it up, the Free Spin was awarded first, and then a letter was called for the dollar amount that the "Free Spin" was placed upon. If their turn ends, the contestant may chose to use their Free Spin if desired.
- Bankrupt – The black-coloured Bankrupt space ended a player's turn and loses their score currently earned for the round only (points from prior rounds are intact). From July 1996 to the 1997 season finale, the solving of a puzzle did not secure the score accrued up to that point in the game, and landing on it at any time of the game took the player's score back to 0, unless the host spun it up during the speed-up round. Between 1981 and 1996, the Bankrupt space would appear once in round 1, and twice in rounds 2 and 3. From April 1996 until July that year, Bankrupt spaces appeared once only in each round. From July 1996 until 1998, the second Bankrupt wedge was brought back for the final puzzle, and then from 1999 onwards, a second Bankrupt was added to the round 2 template for the third puzzle.
- Lose a Turn – Ends the player's turn without affecting their current round's winnings. The Australian version is one of several foreign adaptations to employ multiple Lose a Turn spaces on a single template with a second Lose a Turn space appearing in Round 3 (or Round 4 from July–October 1996 and 1999–2006).
- Red Mystery Letter – Between 1993 and July 1996, and again from May 1997 to 2006, a consonant that appears in red on the puzzle board doubles the amount awarded for choosing that letter.
- Surprise Wedge – Introduced in 1995, the Surprise wedge featured a Mystery prize won by the contestant who picked up the wedge and solved the puzzle on the same round. After the show was moved to Sydney, the Surprise wedge was abandoned until May 1997, where it would appear on a sporadic basis.
- Goodie – Used from July 1995 to July 1996, this automatically awarded a pre-determined prize to the first person who landed on it for the night. This did not rely upon the contestant correctly guessing a letter, it was awarded for the spin. The concept was reinstated in October 1996 with the introduction of the Top Dollar Prize.
- Bonus Wedge – Introduced in late-1993, landing on this space and correctly guessing a letter resulted in the contestant winning the bonus prize. Originally a golden wedge with black text, the 1996 revamp saw it turn into a silver token with blue text at the top of a wedge. It was later replaced in February 1997 by a full blue wedge and the word "Bonus" in glittery text. Bonus would always be added to the wheel at the start of the second round. The Bonus wedge was scrapped in 2003 upon introduction of the Mystery Round, but was reintroduced in July 2006 for the show's final week.
- Top Dollar Prize – Worked the same way as the Goodie wedge. During the later months of the Barber era in 1996, the first person to spin up any top amount during the course of the night was awarded a small prize. Similar to the Goodie wedge, it was awarded for the spin, and did not rely upon the contestant correctly guessing a letter. Prizes ranged from CDs, videotapes, concert tickets, small packages (CD and concert ticket for example) and the electronic Wheel of Fortune game (which was made by Tiger Electronics and licensed by Croner). The wedge seen in the 2008 revival is depicted a pulsating LED wedge, similar to the American version's concurrent 25 wedge (it was Season 25 of the American syndicated version at the time, a one-season only wedge were the prize changes depending on what was on the wedge when the wheel stopped) where the wedge is glittering.
- Bonus Puzzle – Introduced in 1995, the Bonus Puzzle concept was embedded with puzzles that fell into the categories of "Clue", "Blank", and later, "Where Are We?" and "True Or False". The contestant who solved the puzzle on the board was then given the chance to solve the Bonus puzzle for a ($)200 bonus.
- Mystery Wedge (Space) – Between 2003 and 2008, round two featured two 500 spaces marked with a stylised question mark placed on the wheel. If a player landed on one of these mystery wedges and correctly guessed a letter in the puzzle, said contestant was given an option to take a 500‑point buyout or risk their current winnings by 'flipping' the mystery wedge, which displays either a Bankrupt or a special prize on the back. If either of the Mystery wedge is flipped, the remaining wedge functions as a regular 500 space.
- Car Wedge – Used from 13 March 2000 to 9 August 2002, this was a rather convoluted feature that seldom had any outcome. A contestant would need to spin the "car" wedge marked with the logo (such as Proton and Daewoo), choosing the correct consonant and pick the wedge up, then solve the puzzle without landing on the Bankrupt. The contestant have to do the process twice during the first three rounds in order to win the car.
- Million Dollar Wedge – Introduced in the 2008 revival, the wedge had a "$MILLION" two-pegged space sandwiched by two small Bankrupts. The wedge do not have a monetary value but requires the player to solve the puzzle during the round upon picking up. Unlike other prize wedges, the wedge remain in the contestant's possession throughout the entire game and is still susceptible to Bankrupt hits; the wedge enables a contestant to play for $1 million during the bonus round if the player wins the game with the wedge intact.
- Prize Token - Introduced in the 2024 revival, it is similar to that of the 2024 revival version of the British version. There were two. Should a contestant choose a correct consonant, the contestant will win a prize, like a gift certificate or a trip, regardless of the puzzle outcome, but the prize does not count towards the player's total score for the round.

=== Solving a puzzle ===
From 1981 to 1995, money earned in each round was used to shop for prizes. Any remaining cash also counted towards the player's final score. From January 1996, however, the rule used in the Celebrity episodes and Challenges (1995 Champion Challenge / Family Week) was used for the normal game - money secured upon solving puzzles only counted towards the final score at the end of the final puzzle. When this was removed in July 1996 (during Tony Barber's stint), scores and prizes were separated and contestants were given a set prize upon solving a puzzle. By the end of 1996 upon solving a puzzle, contestants could choose one of three prizes offered to them. This would continue until 2004 when it was reduced to two prizes.

In all versions since 2008, solving a puzzle allowed that player to bank any (real) cash and the value of prizes won accumulated up to that point.

=== Speed-Up Round: Final Spin ===
At some point, when time is running short, a bell rings to indicate the final spin where the host would spin the Wheel. All remaining consonants in the puzzle are worth the value of the spin. The player's (in control at that point) arrow would determine the round's value. The players take turns calling one letter each including vowels (no cost/value). If the called letter appears in the puzzle, the player has five seconds after the hostess stops moving to try to solve the puzzle. If a player has a Free Spin, they can still use it to keep turn in the speed-up round. On several episodes, there have been more than one speed‑up round.

If a penalty space is landed during the final spin, the host spins again until a dollar amount is spun. If the host spins up the Bonus wedge, the first player to put a letter on the board gets the prize and the amount under the Bonus wedge is what every letter is worth.

The player with the highest total became the carry-over champion regardless of puzzles solved. This was changed in January 1996 where only cash secured upon solving a puzzle counted towards the final score. In July 1996 when the show was moved to Sydney the former rules were reinstated to determine the champion.

If the champion failed to solve the Major Prize Round puzzle, the money would roll over to the next show (e.g., Player has $2500 in the bank today, misses, wins again tomorrow with $2500; the total bank would be $5000).

=== Cash Prizes ===
The 2008 and 2024 versions feature contestants who play for real cash in place of points. Solving a puzzle would secure the cash, and if earned, prizes for the player. The value of the prize counts towards a player's score.

== Major Prize Round (The Golden Wheel) ==
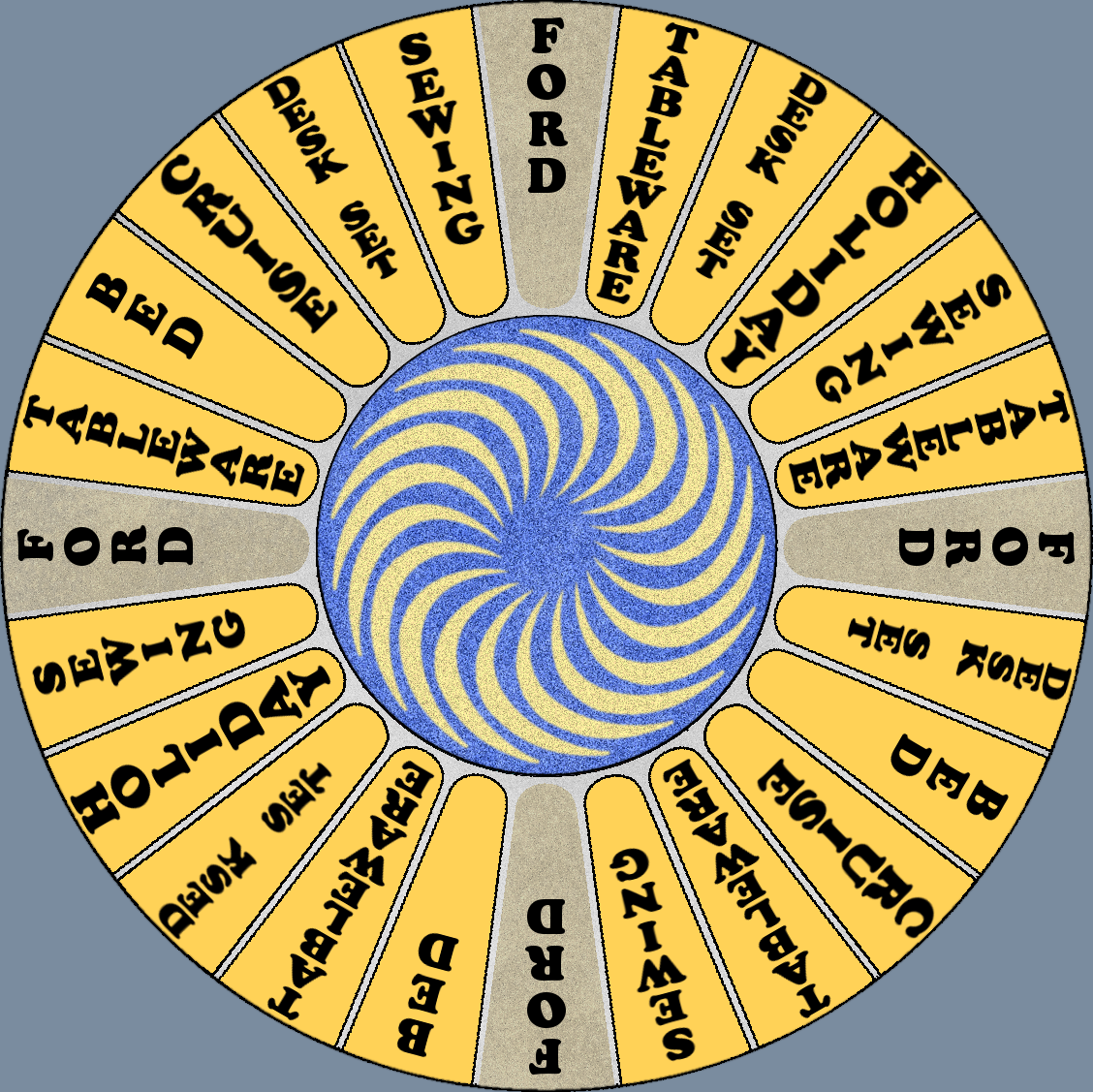
Golden Wheel layout from 1994, with four Ford wedges

After the round with the Final Spin ends, the contestant with the most points advanced to the Major Prize Round. At first, the winner played for a major prize usually worth an average of $4,000. By 1987, the dollar values on the wheel were replaced with various names of prizes with at least one car wedge. The contestant is given help with the final puzzle in the form of consonants and vowels; they start with two consonants and one vowel to start with, plus an additional consonant for every ($)2,000 scored in the main game. Theoretically a maximum of ($)38,000, can be earned so as to call every consonant. The winning contestant then gets 10 seconds to solve the puzzle and win the prize. Contestants can make many guesses during the time limit so long it does not expire. The value for the score cumulates over the next episode each time the contestant does not solve the puzzle until it was won.

The round has sometimes tweaked its format. In the 1995 Family Week, contestants were given five consonants and vowel to choose from regardless of score. In the 1997 Celebrity Week, contestants were given the common letters R, S and E, and then had to choose a further two consonants and a vowel. In the 22nd Anniversary State Challenge of 2003, the winner of the grand final was given five consonants and two vowels.

Since its debut in 1987, there were two gold-silver car wedges on the Golden Wheel. On the 1,500th episode in 1988, an additional car wedge was added. In some instances, additional car wedges were increased by one each day it was not won. The car has never, however, regularly appeared on the wheel for more than three times.

On 15 July 1996, the Golden Wheel was briefly replaced with a selection of five envelopes. The hostess would bring them over to the contestant, the contestant would pick an envelope and then the host opened it up and revealed what the prize was as opposed to revealing it after the round is over. This was retired on August 19, 1996 when the Golden Wheel was reintroduced. The Golden Wheel was also redesigned to reflect the recent changes to the wheel and the set and was carried through to end of the Seven Network series.

From 2000 to 2004, a new progressive jackpot system was added in addition to the car wedges (most of which were from Proton and Daewoo). The jackpot starts at $2,000 with another $100 increasing to the pot every night it was unclaimed. Two "Jackpot" slivers were sandwiched on one of the "Car" wedges. The highest jackpot won was $25,000 (added to the car, a combined prize of almost $50,000). This, and the $5,000 prize on the 5,000th episode, was one of only two cash prizes offered on the show.

From 2004 to 2006, the Golden Wheel saw the number of car wedges decreased to two when it featured a Renault and finally three with a Mitsubishi until the closing of its run on the Seven Network.

In the 2008 revival, the standard top prize (white spaces) was increased to $200,000. The car wedges (purple spaces) also returned but only two spaces are in play. For the beginning of the series, the number of $200,000 wedges started at one and increases one for every night until it was won. The same procedure then occurred with the car wedges starting with two. If a player acquired the Million Dollar wedge in the main game, one $200,000 space would be replaced with the $1 million top prize.

In the 2024 revival, the contestant who solves the 3rd puzzle plays a bonus round, which plays in a similar fashion as the American version; after selecting one of three categories, the puzzle is displayed with all instances of R, S, T, L, N, and E revealed, and the contestant must choose three more consonants and another vowel. After all instances of the chosen letters are revealed, if the contestant can solve the puzzle within ten seconds, they win a bonus prize. In the 2nd bonus round, the contestant who had the most money at the end of the game will play the same bonus round from before. This time, playing for cash, with the prize determined by spinning a smaller wheel, which was differed from the Golden Wheel in the past, as it was based on the same bonus wheel from the American version, containing 24 envelopes with values ranging from $10,000 to $50,000.

== Celebrity weeks ==
Occasionally celebrities play for home viewers, with those viewers earning the prizes and total of the amounts their winning celebrity spun during the game in actual cash. At the end of the week, all those winning home viewers were entered in a drawing to win a car.

There was also a weekly series airing Saturday nights in 1990 and 1991 called "Celebrity Wheel of Fortune".

== The 5,000th episode ==
On 21 March 2006, "Wheel of Fortune" celebrated a major milestone, as its 5,000th episode went to air on the Seven Network. An extra element was added to the special show where contestants had the chance to win $5,000 in cash. Two yellow "$5,000" wedges were added to the Round 1 wheel. A third was added to Round 2's wheel. If a contestant was to spin it up and select a correct letter, they would have 5,000 added to their score, but to win the actual money, they had to solve the puzzle (in the same way as the Surprise and Mystery wedges). In Round 2, one of the contestants did spin up the "$5,000" wedge and the Surprise wedge and solved the puzzle, winning over $10,000 in cash and prizes for that round. The other $5,000 wedges were removed for Round 3.

=== Champions ===
Record-breaking champions include:

- Donovan Newton, $63,110 August 1996 (during the Tony Barber era)
- Dell Edwards, $68,000 12 July 2001 (amount unknown, rounded off)
- Moita Lindgren, $72,917 August 24 & 27, 2001 (mathematical mistake)

At the time of going to air, champion Luke Seager (2004) was the 4th biggest winner of all time, and the second longest champion in terms of nights on air represented. Luke credited his longevity on the wheel (10 nights) to the fact that most newcomers to the show did not comprehend the importance of controlling the wheel. His reign as champion still rates amongst the highest ratings period the program has ever enjoyed.

The longest running contestant of all time was Melissa Roberts. She appeared in twelve shows from 1987, taking home over $50,000 in prizes.

== Presenters ==
=== Hosts ===
- Ernie Sigley (July 1981 – June 1984)
- John Burgess (June 1984 – July 1996)
- Tony Barber (July – December 1996)
- Rob Elliott (January 1997 – December 2003)
- Steve Oemcke (January 2004 – December 2005)
- Larry Emdur (January – July 2006)
- Tim Campbell (May – June 2008)
- Graham Norton (2024 – current)

=== Co-hosts ===
- Adriana Xenides (July 1981 – November 1996, July 1997 – June 1999)
- Kerrie Friend (January – July 1997, as a long-term replacement for Xenides)
- Sophie Falkiner (July 1999 – December 2005)
- Laura Csortan (January – July 2006)
- Kelly Landry (May – June 2008)

=== Announcers ===
- Steve Curtis (July 1981 – December 1982)
- John Dean (January 1983 – December 1985)
- John Deeks (January 1986 – December 1995, January 1997 – July 2006)
- David Day (January – July 1996)
- Ron E. Sparks (July – December 1996)
- Simon Diaz (May – June 2008)

=== Fill-in co-hosts ===
- Kerrie Friend (November 1996, one week; 1997, seven months)
- Terasa Livingstone (November 1996, one week)
- Cecilia Yates (December 1996, one week)
- Bridget Adams (December 1996, one week)
- Tania Zaetta (December 1996, one week; 1999, two weeks)
- Sonia Kruger (1998, two weeks)
- Mel Symons (2003, two weeks)

== Timeline ==
- July 1981: The first episode to air. At the time, the studio was identical to the American version at that time.
- 1984: Red, yellow, and green sunbursts replace the green glitter backdrop, somewhat similar to the red, yellow, and blue sunbursts in the American version. The puzzleboard design is unchanged and was later slightly remodified in colour.
- June 1984: John Burgess replaces Ernie Sigley as host.
- 1986: The show celebrates 1,000 episodes. The Golden Wheel is introduced, allowing contestants to spin up a Major Prize rather than playing for a pre-determined Major Prize.
- 1989: The show changes its timeslot from 5:00 pm to 5:30 pm.
- 4 March 1991: The show celebrates 2,000 episodes. Top dollar values increase to $400, $750 and $2,000.
- Late 1992: Sunburst backdrops are replaced with cones and the green backdrop becomes turquoise. A new colour scheme for the wheel is introduced.
- 10 October 1994: Celebratory episode commemorating John Burgess' 10th anniversary as host was aired. Set background changes from blue to yellow.
- 30 January 1995: The 1995 season begins with the $100,000 Champion Challenge. Former contestants are invited back to play heats for 3 weeks leading to a Grand Final on February 20. The theme music and the show's logo are updated. The set background colour now changes back to blue. Top dollar amounts in Rounds 1 and 2 increase to $500 and $1,000. The lightbox on the puzzleboard showing the puzzle category was removed after the champion challenge concluded and was replaced with an onscreen display.
- 10 October 1995: The show celebrates 3,000 episodes.
- 29 January 1996: The 1996 season premiere commences with a new puzzleboard consisting of an extra row added to the existing three rows of trilons. John Burgess has shaved the moustache, and David Day becomes the new announcer following John Deeks' departure to host Family Feud. The champion is no longer the one with the highest accumulated score, he/she now needs to have secured the most cash upon solving a puzzle.
- 15 July 1996: The show relocated to Sydney with Tony Barber replacing John Burgess as host and Ron E Sparks replaces David Day as announcer. A new set and its theme music with the wheel mounted on a 20° incline was unveiled. Until the 1997 finale, landing on a Bankrupt now expunges a contestant's score in its entirety regardless of the puzzles solved, and as such, the champion once again is the person with the highest accumulated score at the end of the last puzzle. The turquoise backdrop changes to blue. The Golden Wheel is replaced with envelopes, and the bonus round is played in front of the wheel instead of behind the wheel from the central podium - a this would continue once the wheel was spun following the reintroduction of the Golden Wheel.
- 19 August 1996: The former theme music is returned. An attempt is made to have both themes co-exist together with a derivative of the new theme music used to introduce the new contestants each night. The on-screen visuals now featured an on-screen timer display in the Major Prize Round.
- October 1996: Following the Family Week special, the main game reverts to a three-round format. Top Dollar prize is introduced and a new prize-shop is introduced where contestants choose a prize out of the selection of three offered to them upon solving a puzzle. The co-existence of both themes cease in favour of the reintroduced theme music and associated sound effects.
- 18 November 1996: Kerrie Friend becomes the first substitute hostess in the show's history after Adriana Xenides took sick leave.
- 6 January 1997: Rob Elliott replaces Tony Barber as host. Kerrie Friend returns to the puzzleboard as a long-term replacement for Adriana Xenides until July 4. John Deeks returns to the booth as announcer.
- 5 May 1997: The Surprise wedge and the Red Mystery Letter are returned.
- 14 June 1999: Sophie Falkiner replaced Adriana Xenides as hostess.
- 13 March 2000: Car wedges are introduced on the wheel beginning its run with the Proton (later Daewoo in 2001) wedge. The top values are now tweaked to 750, 1500, and 2500 respectively. A progressive cash jackpot is added on the Golden Wheel, starting at $2,000 and adding another $100 each episode until the jackpot is claimed.
- 13 June 2000: Wheel celebrates its 4,000th episode, and four car wedges are placed on the Golden Wheel.
- 2003: The Mystery Round is introduced along with Mystery wedges, similar to the American version's namesake round first introduced a year prior. The Bonus, Surprise, and "car" wedges are retired in favour of the new round.
- 11 August 2003: The set background changes to purple with another update to the show's logo. The bonus round is now played in front of the video wall next to the puzzle board instead of in front of the Wheel. First episode in HD.
- 9 February 2004: Steve Oemcke replaces Rob Elliott as host. The set is updated that is similar to the American version (at the time), with a revamped electronic touchscreen puzzleboard replacing the trilons (similar to the American version which made the change in 1997) and eggcrate display replacing the seven-segment display and the addition of Flip Ups and Prize Puzzles. The timeslot changes back to 5:00 pm as part of the Wheel and Deal hour, with Deal or No Deal taking the previous Wheel slot.
- Late 2005: Larry Emdur and Laura Csortan replace Steve Oemcke and Sophie Falkiner as host and hostess respectively after it was announced by Sunrise hosts David Koch & Melissa Doyle.
- 30 January 2006: The show returns to air after a year's hiatus. The whole set is revamped with the remaining of the letters' font, the theme music and the wheel. Wheel moves to Pyrmont from Epping's studios, with another update of the set, such as a puzzleboard with a blue border that changes colour and features light animation, similar to the American version; the LG flat screen plasmas replace the Contestant Trapezoid backdrops that animate during events on the show, such as landing on Bankrupt, bell sound, or solving the puzzle, and the return of Surprise wedge.
- 21 March 2006: The show celebrates its 5,000th episode with multiple chances to win $5,000.
- July 2006: The show celebrates 25 years on Australia television on 21 July, and ends its run on the Seven Network a week later on 28 July. 20 unaired episodes were aired featuring Steve Oemcke, Sophie Falkiner and the old set (see the 2004 section) from 2005, before it was shelved.
- 26 May 2008: Wheel of Fortune is picked up by the Nine Network now known as Million Dollar Wheel of Fortune and hosted by Tim Campbell. The show runs only five weeks on air due to low ratings and negative reviews, including one where Burgess and Xenides had an argument about why they both disliked the show. Despite the low ratings, the Million Dollar wedge (with one slight modification in that it can be picked up in the first three rounds) is adopted in the United States for the ensuing season in September.
- October 2023: Wheel of Fortune announced it's to return to Australian television after being picked up be Network 10. The show was recorded in the UK and hosted by Graham Norton with Australian expats. Eight shows aired in a new hour-long format make up the new series with the set mirroring the American set. There have been no updates of any futures episode since.

== See also ==
- Family Feud
- List of longest-running Australian television series
- The Chase Australia
- Letters and Numbers
- Sale of the Century (Australian game show)
- Who Wants to Be a Millionaire? (Australian game show)
