= Phillip Houghton =

Australian guitarist and composer

Phillip Houghton (26 April 1954 – 30 September 2017) was an Australian classical guitarist and composer. Born in Melbourne, he began studying music at the age of 20 at Melba Conservatorium of Music. After a year, he then began studying privately with well-known classical pianist and guitarist Sebastian Jorgenson at the Montsalvat Artists Colony in Eltham, Victoria.

Although Houghton had little compositional training, his music has achieved critical acclaim. In particular, his piece Stélé was recorded by John Williams in his 1998 album The Guitarist. Karin Schaupp made the first complete recording. Houghton composed music for film and Television, including the motion picture "The Custodian" (John Dingwall) and the animation series Plasmo (Tony Lawrence). He wrote a large number of unpublished sketches for electronic media and produced a record of his own experimental improvisations on electric guitar and piano frame, distributed privately.

Houghton lived for many years in Sydney, teaching from his home in Petersham and then Summer Hill. He was highly regarded as a teacher, with a profound understanding of guitar technique and musical interpretation. He died, unexpectedly, within months of his returning to live in Melbourne in 2017. A posthumous personal reflection on Houghton has been written by Aleksandr Tsiboulski. A fortnight after his death, Michael MacManus played at the Monsalvat Artists Colony a selection of Houghton's works studied with the composer since his return to Melbourne in a fitting and poignant tribute to Houghton's life and music.
