= Ron E Sparks =

Australian radio personality and voice talent (1952–2024)

- Ron E Sparks while broadcasting
- Born: Gregory James Sparks; 4 March 1952; Brisbane, Australia
- Died: 13 July 2024 (aged 72)
- Other name: Ronnie Sparks
- Occupations: Broadcaster, voiceover artist
- Website: ronesparks.com

Gregory James Sparks (4 March 1952 – 13 July 2024), better known by his broadcast name Ron E Sparks, was an Australian broadcaster and radio and television voiceover artist.

== Early career ==
Sparks worked in several regional radio stations before moving to Sydney in the 1970s, where he managed to score a role on air at the then-top-rated AM station 2SM as Ron E. Sparx, and quickly became one of Sydney's most respected announcers, interviewing many stars of the day. In an interview, Sparks stated that 2SM had broader Top 40 content, playing everything from AC/DC and Led Zeppelin, to Barbra Streisand and Benny Hill's milkman song.

The "E" in his name does not stand for anything. It was originally added by program director Rod Muir, who thought that "Ronnie Sparx" sounded too immature, and wanted Sparks to transition gradually to using just "Ron", which he had resisted doing.

Sparks also made a name as a television voice artist, and provided voice overs for several Australian television shows, such as Wheel of Fortune and Hot Streak. On 1 October 1978, he hosted a special edition of ABC-TV's Countdown called Rocktober. After leaving 2SM, Sparks became the program director of another Sydney AM station, 2UW. After leaving 2UW he worked on top-rating FM station Triple M for almost six years before being lured to rival station 2Day FM in 1994.

== Departure from 2Day FM ==
As 2Day FM grew more corporate and merged with Triple M, Sparks grew increasingly frustrated with group politics and had a hard time dealing with the egos of young network 'upstarts' who were given endless rope to play with. For some young 'stars' it seemed that they could do no wrong, and management always made excuses for them.

One particular complaint he had was with the night team (Kyle & Jackie O) smoking in the studio. This had been going on for some time, and despite it being illegal (2Day was in a high rise building in Bondi Junction, it was frowned upon at the time. It since has become illegal to smoke in Australian workplaces), the general manager failed to take any action. One morning in 2001, Sparks arrived for his shift to find the studio smelling of stale smoke, and littered with cigarette butts, some of which were floating in glasses of water. He became upset, and wrote "No Smoking" with a marker pen on every physical object he could find in the studio.

Sparks had used permanent marker, which destroyed several hundred dollars' worth of equipment, and he was sacked immediately following his shift that day. Sparks refused media interviews, even though the large majority agreed with him and applauded his actions. He contemplated legal action against 2Day but decided against it, in the interest of saving his career.

Sparks was only out of work for a week before being offered work at Nova 96.9 for the 2001 summer period. In 2002, he moved to WSFM, from which he departed in December 2017 after almost 16 years with WSFM.

He was the voice of the Capital Radio Network station 2CA for three decades.

== Personal life and death ==
Sparks was born Gregory James Sparks on 4 March 1952 and was raised in Brisbane. He later lived in the north Sydney suburb of Cammeray with his wife and two sons. He died from cancer on 13 July 2024, at the age of 72.
