= Kerrie Friend =

Australian model and TV presenter (born 1963)

Kerrie Friend (born 2 October 1963) is an Australian model and TV presenter best known for co-hosting Wheel of Fortune and Perfect Match.
