= Rob Elliott =

Australian television presenter

- Born: 8 October 1969 (age 57); Brisbane, Queensland, Australia
- Occupations: Australian radio announcer and television show host

Rob Elliott (born 8 October 1969) is an Australian radio announcer and television show host, best known for hosting Wheel of Fortune from January 1997 to December 2003.

== Television career ==
His first TV job was the children's TV program OK for Kids in Brisbane on Channel 9. Then became the Melbourne-based reporter for Wombat for the Seven Network during the 1980s. Had several parts in Neighbours and in 1996, he became host of Talking Telephone Numbers (based on a UK format) for the Seven Network. During the mid to late 80s he also worked for Brisbane Radio Station, 1008AM "Stereo 10" as a radio announcer and Geelong's 93.9 Bay FM / 3XY in the early '90s. He had the most success working for the Triple M network where he took the drive show to number one in Melbourne, and rated number one in Sydney hosting Home Grown.

His best-known role was as the host of Wheel of Fortune from 1997 to 2003, replacing Tony Barber who replaced John Burgess for a very short time. After being fired from the show, Elliott created a board game called Smart Ass. He explained, I used to play Trivial Pursuit and never won – I hated it. I created a game I could win. In 2017, he became involved in a legal dispute with Sale of the Century champion Cary Young, who wrote questions for Smart Ass. Young however never had a case against Elliott and pulled out of the litigation not long after. Cary Young was suffering from dementia and died from the disease on 31 December 2022.
