= John Burgess (host) =

Australian radio and television personality (born 1943)

- Born: John Richard Burgess; 4 June 1943 (age 83); Sydney, New South Wales, Australia
- Other names: Burgo; Baby John Burgess (nicknames)
- Occupations: Radio host, television host
- Years active: 1963−present
- Known for: Radio programming: 2UW); Breakfast (3AK); Breakfast (3MP); Breakfast (6PM; Breakfast (2CH); Breakfast (3MP); Television programs: Wheel of Fortune (Seven Network); Burgo's Catch Phrase (Nine Network); Pass the Buck (Nine Network)

John Richard Burgess (born 4 June 1943) is an Australian radio and television personality and host. He is often referred to as "Burgo" and sometimes "Baby John Burgess" or "Baby John", nicknames deriving from his radio days when he was the youngest presenter at the station. He has worked in the industry since 1963. He is best known for his long-term hosting of the Australian version of game show Wheel of Fortune and as a breakfast radio host.

== Radio and television presenting ==
Burgess has hosted numerous radio shows over the years. He started in the industry through a chance meeting with John Laws, and joined his network radio station 2GB.

John Burgess Radio timeline
2UW	1967–1970
3AK	1970–1974
2UW	1974–1976
3MP	1976–1978
6PM	1978–1988
2CH	1997–2004
3MP	2006–2009
6IX	2011–2015; 2017–2023

On 25 September 2006, he started as breakfast show announcer for the easy listening radio station 3MP in Melbourne.

On 12 December 2011, he took over from Johnny Young at 6IX in Perth, departing the station in December 2015. Burgess returned to 6IX in a new timeslot on 22 April 2017.

Burgess moved into television in the 1970s, when hosting the teenage music show Turning On on the Seven Network station HSV7. The series features many popular music artists and bands, including Zoot and Gilian Fitzgerald, one of the main dancers, and featured Judy Moody and Christine Kelson.

Burgess took over from Ernie Sigley, the original host of Wheel of Fortune on the Seven Network, taking over in 1984 and remaining until 1996. He then hosted game show Catch Phrase on the Nine Network; it was eventually renamed Burgo's Catch Phrase.

He also hosted the game show Pass the Buck in 2002, also on Nine Network and hosted some Oz Lotto draws from 1994 to 1995 on Channel 7 every Tuesday.

John Burgess joined the cast of the reality comedy series Balls of Steel Australia on The Comedy Channel in 2012.

== Health concerns ==
In February 2022, Burgess was admitted to the ICU at Royal Perth Hospital, having acquired a bacterial infection which caused sepsis. Since being treated for sepsis, Burgess has become an advocate for recognizing symptoms early. He has spoken about his experience as a survivor and continues to struggle with post-sepsis syndrome, including fatigue and weakness.
