= Burgo's Catch Phrase =

Australian game show

- Also known as: Catch Phrase (1997–1999)
- Genre: Game show
- Based on: Catch Phrase (American game show) by Steve Radosh
- Presented by: John Burgess
- Narrated by: Cameron Humphrey (1997–2002); Pete Smith (2003)
- Country of origin: Australia
- Original language: English
- No. of seasons: 7

Production
- Executive producers: Michael Boughen; Wayne Cameron
- Production locations: Sydney, New South Wales
- Running time: 30 minutes (inc. commercials)
- Production companies: Southern Star Group (1997–2001); Southern Star Endemol (2002–2003)

Original release
- Network: Nine Network
- Release: 31 March 1997 – 26 November 2003

Burgo's Catch Phrase is an Australian game show that ran between 1997 and 2003, produced by Southern Star Group (and later by the joint-venture Endemol Southern Star) for the Nine Network. The show was based on the British and American versions of the program, and was originally known simply as Catch Phrase until 1999 where the show was renamed as Burgo's Catch Phrase in honour of its host, John Burgess. The show was cancelled in 2003 after a revamp of the show and a hiatus in 2001. The show ended on 26 November 2003.

Contestants would have to identify the familiar phrase represented by a piece of animation, with the show's mascot – a character called "Jimmy" – often appearing. In the original run, two contestants played in each game, but in the 2002 revamp, this was increased to three.

== The Main Game ==
In the main game, at the start of each round, one contestant stopped a randomiser which consisted of money amounts by hitting his/her button. The value that was landed would then be the amount for the normal catch phrases. On each normal catch phrase, the computer would draw it on the screen. When it was done, a bell would ring, signifying the contestants to buzz-in when they think they know the answer.

A regular catch phrase could be worth $20–$75 in the first round, $40–$100 in round two, and $75–$150 in round three.

A correct answer won the contestant the pre-determined money amount, plus a chance to solve the Bonus Catch Phrase which was hidden behind nine squares with the show's logo on each. To choose a square, the contestant had to hit their button to stop a randomiser from flashing around the board after which the square was revealed, and they had a chance to guess. A correct answer would win bonus money for the player ($100 for the first round, $200 for the second round and $300 for the third round.) Also, each round's Bonus Catch Phrase offered a minor prize hidden behind a mystery square.

In the 2002 revival, if in the second round, the Bonus Catch Phrase was solved after five squares or less, another round worth $200 was played. Also, there was a mystery Cash Prize of $200 in one game, which increased by $200 the next day if it was not won.

After three rounds, the player with the most money won the game and played the Super Catch Phrase.

=== Super Catch Phrase ===
The final round involved a game board (five by five grid) with 25 lettered squares (A–Y) with catchphrases hidden behind each. The winning contestant had the task to capture five squares in a horizontal, vertical or diagonal line within 60 seconds. Prizes were won if successful, with a larger prize if the winning player used the central "M" square. It is possible to win both prizes if two lines were made, where one line goes through the "M" square and the other line doesn't go through the "M" square.

From their fifth winning show onwards, champions could win a car by completing a line through the "M" square. For three seasons, the M square displayed the logo of the manufacturer providing the car. Originally, the square was marked with the VW logo of Volkswagen Group, but later changed to the stylized "H" logo of Hyundai Motor Group. During this period, which ended following the penultimate series, in order to play the puzzle in the centre square the contestant had to call out the name of the sponsor of the square (either "VW" or "Hyundai").

Winning the car at any point retired the champion immediately with whatever they had won to that point. Otherwise, the champion played until being defeated.

== See also ==
- Catch Phrase (American game show)
- Catchphrase (British game show)
